= Mauritius =

Island country in the Indian Ocean

Republic of Mauritius: République de Maurice (French); Repiblik Moris (Morisyen)
- Flag Coat of arms
- Motto: Stella Clavisque Maris Indici (Latin) "Star and Key of the Indian Ocean"
- Anthem: "Motherland"
- Islands of the Republic of Mauritius

- Islands of Mauritius labelled in black. * Tromelin Island (part of the French Southern and Antarctic Lands, claimed by Mauritius). * The Chagos Archipelago (part of the British Indian Ocean Territory, claimed by Mauritius).
- Capital and largest city: Port Louis; 20.2°S 57.5°E
- Official languages: None (de jure): English; French; (de facto)
- Language spoken at home (2022): 90.0% Mauritian Creole; 5.1% Mauritian Bhojpuri; 4.4% French; 0.6% English
- Ethnic groups: 67% Indian; 28% Creole; 3% Chinese; 2% French
- Religion (2022): 47.9% Hinduism; 32.3% Christianity; 18.2% Islam; 1.6% others / none
- Demonym: Mauritian
- Government: Unitary parliamentary republic
  - President: Dharam Gokhool
  - Vice-President: Robert Hungley
  - Prime Minister: Navin Ramgoolam
  - Deputy Prime Minister: Arianne Navarre-Marie
  - Speaker of the National Assembly: Shirin Aumeeruddy-Cziffra
- Legislature: National Assembly

Independence from the United Kingdom
  - Constitution of Mauritius: 12 March 1968
  - Republic: 12 March 1992

Area
  - Total: 2,040 km^{2} (790 sq mi) (169th)
  - Water (%): 0.07

Population
  - 2022 census: 1,235,260
  - Density: 605.5/km^{2} (1,568.2/sq mi) (18th)
- GDP (PPP): 2026 estimate
  - Total: ▲$43.676 billion (141st)
  - Per capita: ▲$34,830 (65th)
- GDP (nominal): 2026 estimate
  - Total: ▲$16.756 billion (141st)
  - Per capita: ▲$13,362 (76th)
- Gini (2017): 36.8 medium inequality
- HDI (2023): ▲0.806 very high (73rd)
- Currency: Mauritian rupee (MUR)
- Time zone: UTC+4 (MUT)
- Calling code: +230
- ISO 3166 code: MU
- Internet TLD: .mu

Mauritius, (Note: /məˈrɪʃ(i)əs, mɔː-/ mər-ISH-(ee-)əs, mor-; French: Maurice [mɔʁis, moʁis]; Mauritian Creole: Moris [moʁis]) officially the Republic of Mauritius, (Note: French: République de Maurice; Mauritian Creole: Repiblik Moris) is an island country in the Indian Ocean, located about 1,100 nautical miles (2,000 km; 1,300 mi) off the southeastern coast of Africa, east of Madagascar. It includes the main island (also called Mauritius), as well as Rodrigues, Agaléga, and St. Brandon (Cargados Carajos shoals). The islands of Mauritius and Rodrigues, along with nearby Réunion, are part of the Mascarene Islands. The main island of Mauritius, where the population is concentrated, hosts the capital and largest city, Port Louis. The country spans 2,040 square kilometres (790 sq mi) and has an exclusive economic zone covering approximately 580,000 square nautical miles (2,000,000 km^{2}; 770,000 sq mi).

The 1502 Portuguese Cantino planisphere has led some historians to speculate that Arab sailors were the first to discover the uninhabited island around 975, naming it Dina Arobi. Called Ilha do Cirne or Ilha do Cerne on early Portuguese maps, the island was visited by Portuguese sailors in 1507. A Dutch fleet landed at what is now the Grand Port District and took possession of the island in 1598, renaming it after Maurice, Prince of Orange. Short-lived Dutch attempts at permanent settlement took place over a century aimed at exploiting the local ebony forests, establishing sugar and arrack production. When French colonisation began in 1715, the island was renamed "Isle de France". In 1810, the United Kingdom seized the island and under the Treaty of Paris, France ceded Mauritius and its dependencies to the United Kingdom. The British colony of Mauritius now included Rodrigues, Agaléga, St. Brandon, the Chagos Archipelago, and, until 1906, the Seychelles. Mauritius and France dispute sovereignty over the island of Tromelin, the treaty failing to mention it specifically. Mauritius became the British Empire's main sugar-producing colony and remained a primarily sugar-dominated plantation-based colony until independence, in 1968. The country became a republic in 1992 but retained the Privy Council of the United Kingdom as its highest court of appeal.

In 1965, three years before the independence of Mauritius, the United Kingdom split the Chagos Archipelago away from Mauritius, and the islands of Aldabra, Farquhar, and Desroches from the Seychelles, to form the British Indian Ocean Territory (BIOT). The local population was forcibly expelled and the largest island, Diego Garcia, was leased to the United States, restricting access to the archipelago. Ruling on the sovereignty dispute, the International Court of Justice gave an advisory opinion, ordering the return of the Chagos Islands to Mauritius, leading to a 2025 bilateral agreement on the recognition of its sovereignty on the islands, signed in May 2025.

Given its geographic location and colonial past, the people of Mauritius are diverse in ethnicity, culture, language and faith. It is the only country in Africa where Hinduism is the most practised religion. Indo-Mauritians make up the bulk of the population with significant Creole, Sino-Mauritian and Franco-Mauritian minorities. The island's government is closely modelled on the Westminster parliamentary system with Mauritius highly ranked for economic and political freedom. The Economist Democracy Index ranks Mauritius as the only country in Africa with full democracy while the V-Dem Democracy Indices classified it as an electoral democracy.

Mauritius ranks 73rd (very high) in the Human Development Index and the World Bank classifies it as a high-income economy. It is amongst the most competitive and most developed economies in Africa. The country is a welfare state. The government provides free universal health care, free education up through the tertiary level, and free public transportation for students, senior citizens, and disabled people. Mauritius is consistently ranked as the most peaceful country in Africa.

Along with the other Mascarene Islands, Mauritius is known for its biodiverse flora and fauna with many unique species endemic to the country. The main island was the only known home of the dodo, which became extinct soon after human settlement. Other endemic animals, such as the echo parakeet, the Mauritius kestrel and the pink pigeon, have survived and are subject to intensive and successful ongoing conservation efforts.

== Etymology ==
The first historical evidence of the existence of the island now known as Mauritius is on a 1502 map called the Cantino planisphere which was smuggled out of Portugal, for the Duke of Ferrara, by the Italian 'spy' Alberto Cantino. On this purloined copy of a Portuguese map, Mauritius bore the name Dina Arobi or Dina Arobin (likely Arabic: دنية عروبي Daniyah 'Arūbi or corruption of دبية عروبي Dībah 'Arūbi).

In 1507, Portuguese sailors visited the uninhabited island after being blown off course from their route to India via the Mozambique channel. The island appears with the Portuguese names Cirne (a typographical error where the 's' of the Portuguese 'Cisne' (Swan) became an 'r') or Do-Cerne (typo of 'do Cisne' meaning 'of' or 'belonging to the Swan') on early Portuguese maps, almost certainly from the name of a ship called Cisne which was captained by Diogo Fernandes Pereira in the 1507 expedition which discovered Mauritius and Rodrigues, which he called ilha de Diogo Fernandes, but poorly transcribed by non-Portuguese speakers as Domigo Friz or Domingo Frias. Diogo Fernandes Pereira may have been the first European to sail east of Madagascar island ('outer route' to the East Indies) rather than through the perceived safer route through the Mozambique channel, following the East African shore line.

In 1598, a Dutch squadron under Admiral Wybrand van Warwyck landed at Grand Port and named the island Mauritius, in honour of Prince Maurice van Nassau, stadtholder of the Dutch Republic. Later the island became a French colony and was renamed Isle de France. On 3 December 1810, the French surrendered the island to the United Kingdom during the Napoleonic Wars. Under British rule, the island's name reverted to Mauritius /məˈrɪʃəs/. Mauritius is also commonly known as Maurice (pronounced [mɔʁis]) and Île Maurice in French, as well as Moris (pronounced [moʁis]) in Mauritian Creole.

== History ==
=== Early history ===
The island of Mauritius was uninhabited before its first recorded visit by Arab sailors in the end of the 10th century. Its name Dina Arobi has been associated with Arab sailors who first discovered the island.

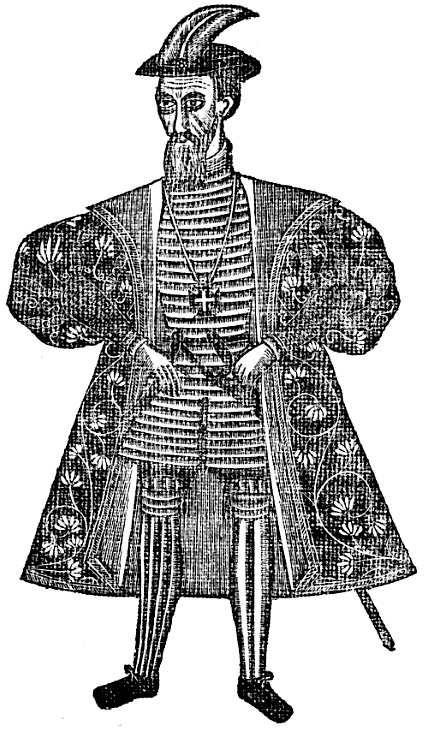
Pedro Mascarenhas, Viceroy of Portuguese India and namesake of the Mascarene Islands

The Treaty of Tordesillas, designed to prevent conflict between Portugal and Spain, gave the Kingdom of Portugal the right to colonise this part of the world. In 1507, Portuguese sailors came to the uninhabited island and established a visiting base. Diogo Fernandes Pereira, a Portuguese navigator, was the first European known to land in Mauritius. He named the island "Ilha do Cisne" ("Island of the Swan"). The Portuguese did not stay long as they were not interested in these islands. The Mascarene Islands were named after Pedro Mascarenhas, Viceroy of Portuguese India, after his visit to the islands in 1512. Rodrigues Island was named after Portuguese explorer Diogo Rodrigues, who first came upon the island in 1528.

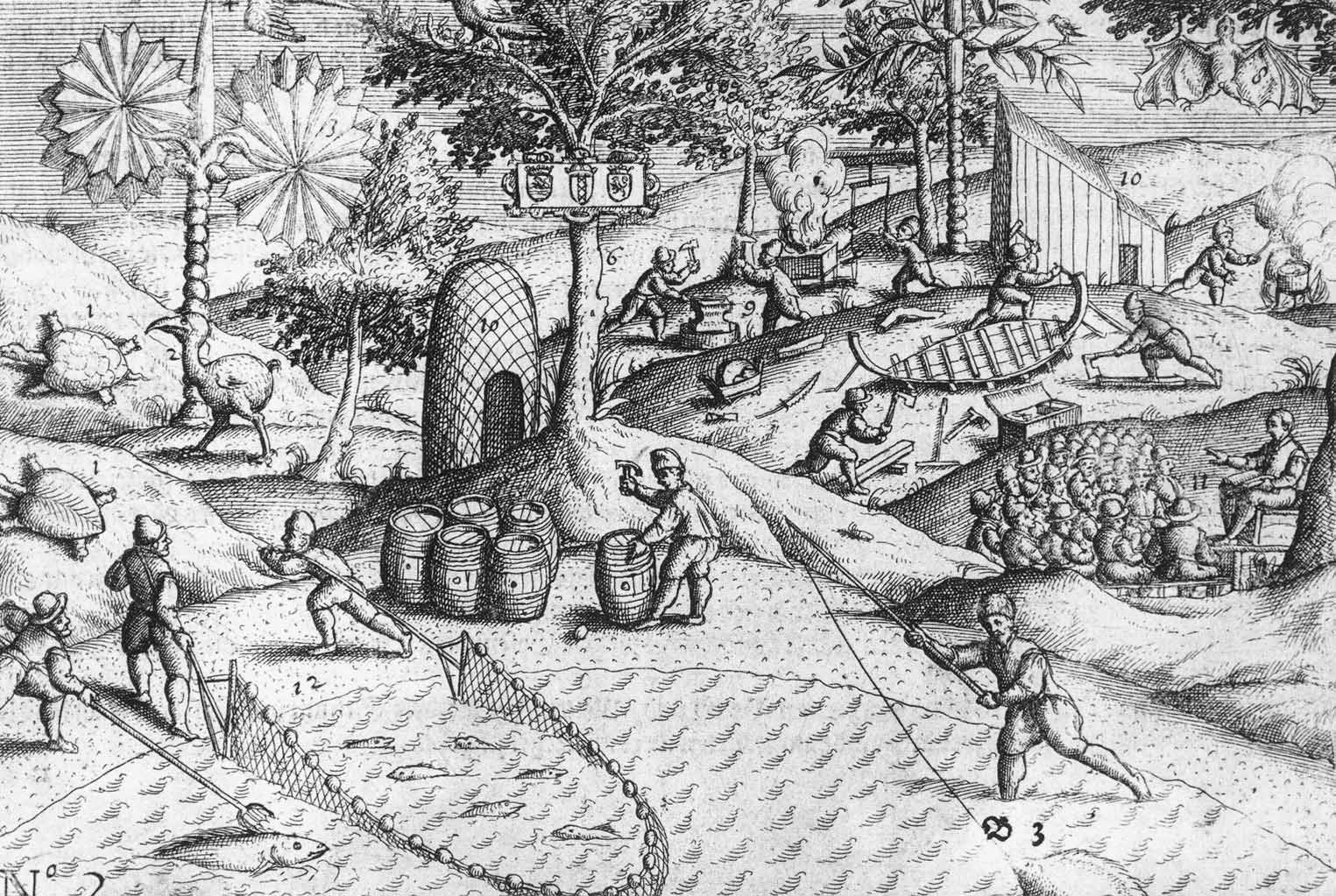
Dutch activities on Mauritius, and the first published depiction of a dodo bird (2), 1601

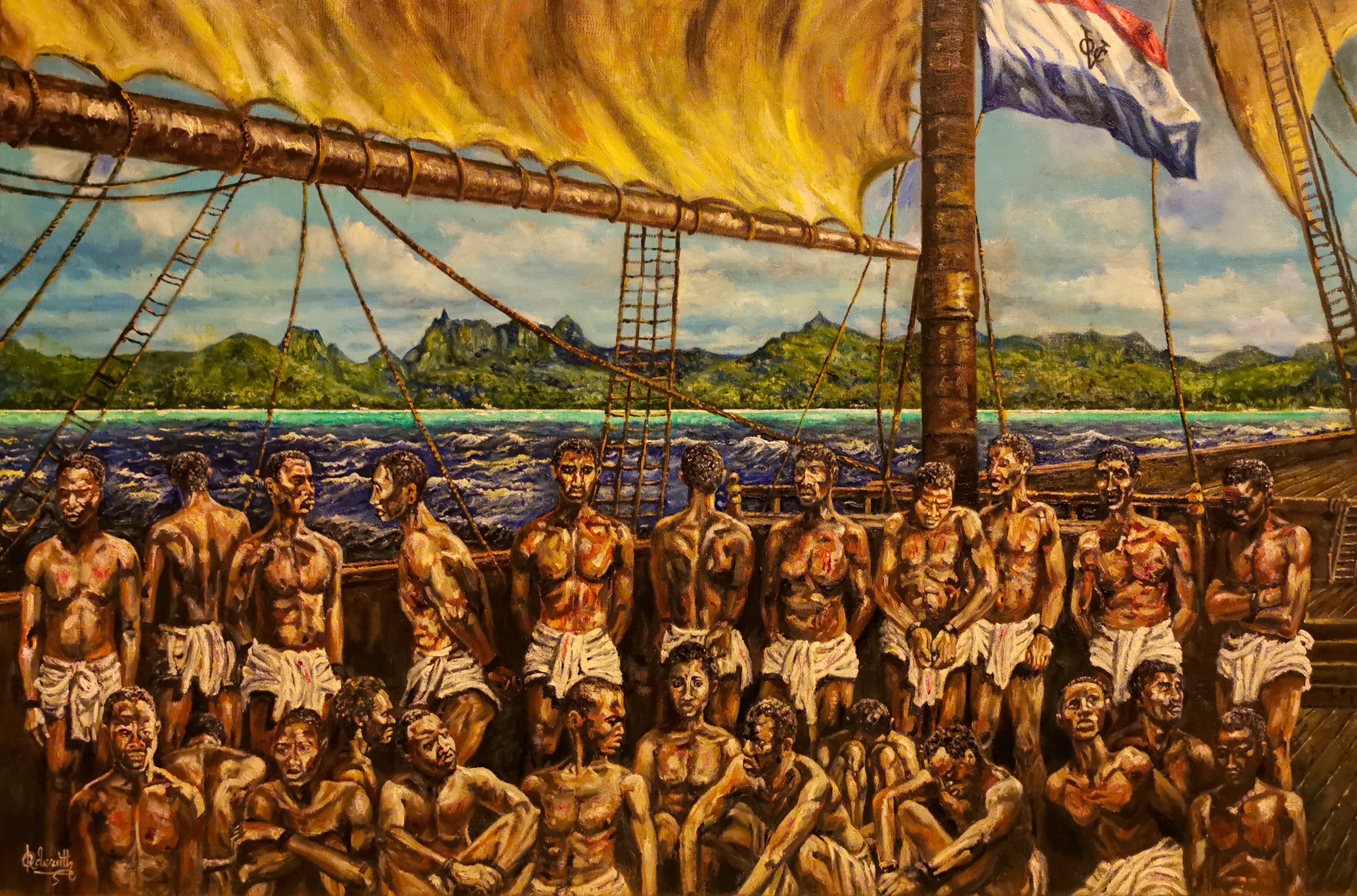
The first African slaves sent to Mauritius

In 1598, a Dutch squadron under Admiral Wybrand Van Warwyck landed at Grand Port and named the island "Mauritius" after Prince Maurice of Nassau (Dutch: Maurits van Nassau) of the Dutch Republic. The Dutch inhabited the island in 1638, from which they exploited ebony trees and introduced sugar cane, domestic animals and deer. It was from here that Dutch navigator Abel Tasman set out to seek the Great Southern Land, mapping parts of Tasmania, New Zealand and New Guinea.

The first Dutch settlement lasted 20 years. In 1639, the Dutch East India Company brought enslaved Malagasy to cut down ebony trees and to work in the new tobacco and sugar cane plantations. Several attempts to establish a colony permanently were subsequently made, but the settlements never developed enough to produce dividends, causing the Dutch to abandon Mauritius in 1710.

A 1755 article in the English Leeds Intelligencer claims that the island was abandoned due to the large number of long tailed macaque monkeys "which destroyed everything in it," and that it was also known at the time as the Island of Monkeys. Portuguese sailors had brought these monkeys to the island from their native habitat in Southeast Asia, prior to Dutch rule.

=== French Mauritius (1715–1810) ===
France, which already controlled neighbouring Île Bourbon (now Réunion), took control of Mauritius in 1715 and renamed it Isle de France. In 1723, the Code Noir was established to regulate slavery; it categorised one group of human beings as "goods", allowing the owner of these "goods" to be able to obtain insurance money and compensation in case of loss of his "goods". The 1735 arrival of French governor Bertrand-François Mahé de La Bourdonnais coincided with the development of a prosperous economy based on sugar production. Mahé de La Bourdonnais established Port Louis as a naval base and a shipbuilding centre.

Under his governorship, numerous buildings were erected, a number of which are still standing. These include part of Government House, the Château de Mon Plaisir, and the Line Barracks, the headquarters of the police force. The island was under the administration of the French East India Company, which maintained its presence until 1767. During the French rule, slaves were brought from parts of Africa such as Mozambique and Zanzibar. As a result, the island's population rose dramatically from 15,000 to 49,000 within thirty years. Slave traders from Madagascar—Sakalava or Arabs—bought slaves from slavers in the Arab Swahili coast or Portuguese Mozambique and stopped at Seychelles for supplies before shipping the slaves to the slave markets of Mauritius, Réunion and India.

Of the 80,000 slaves imported to Réunion and Mauritius between 1769 and 1793, 45% was provided by slave traders of the Sakalava people in North West Madagascar, who raided East Africa and the Comoros for slaves, and the rest was provided by Arab slave traders who bought slaves from Portuguese Mozambique and transported them to Réunion via Madagascar. During the late eighteenth century, African slaves accounted for around 80 percent of the island's population, and by the early nineteenth century there were 60,000 slaves on the island. In early 1729, Indians from Pondicherry, India, arrived in Mauritius aboard the vessel La Sirène. Work contracts for these craftsmen were signed in 1734 at the time when they acquired their freedom.

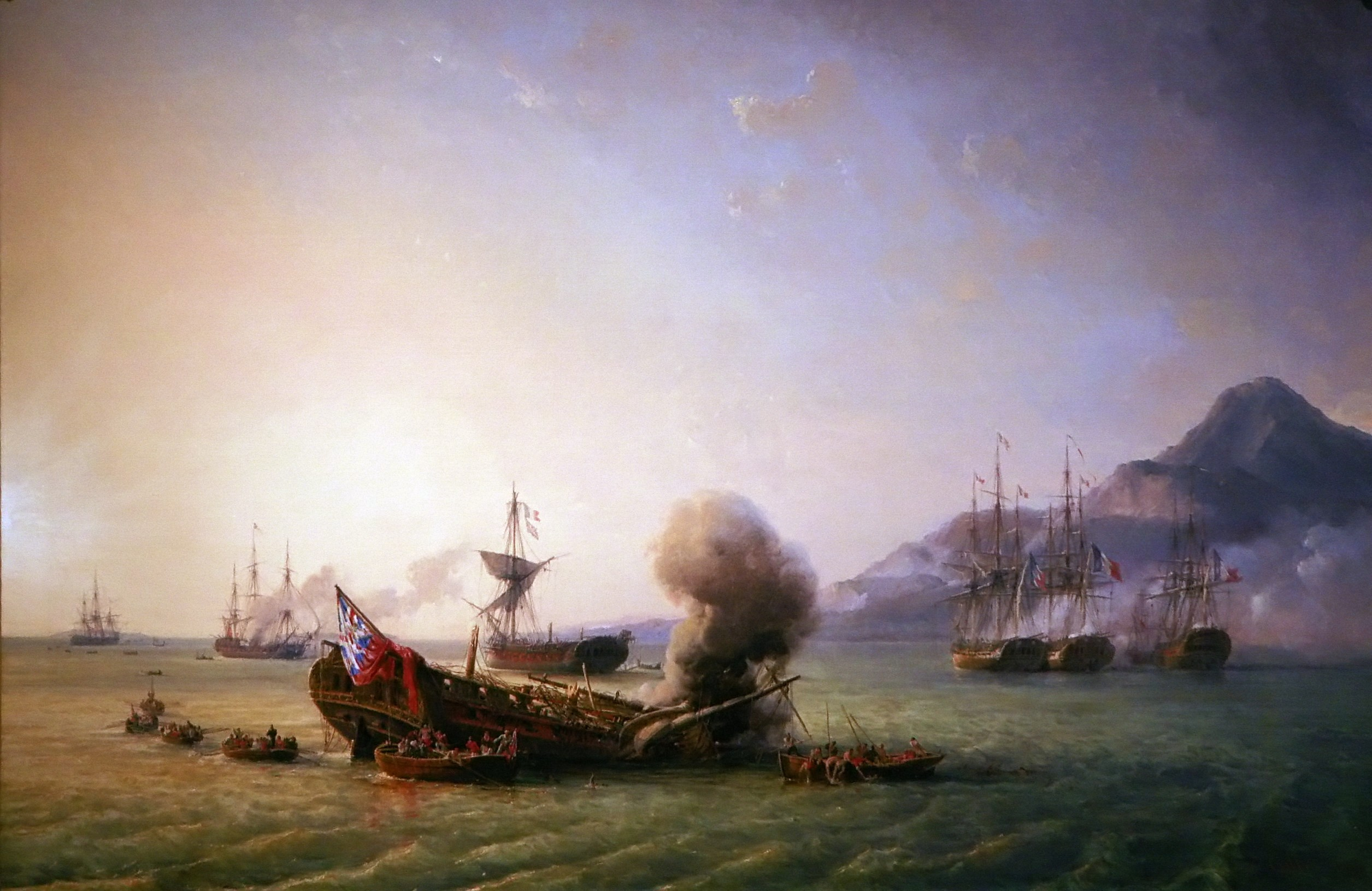
The Battle of Grand Port between French and British naval forces, 20–27 August 1810

From 1767 to 1810, except for a brief period during the French Revolution when the inhabitants set up a government virtually independent of France, the island was controlled by officials appointed by the French government. Jacques-Henri Bernardin de Saint-Pierre lived on the island from 1768 to 1771, then went back to France, where he wrote Paul et Virginie, a love story that made the Isle de France famous wherever the French language was spoken. In 1796 the settlers broke away from French control when the government in Paris attempted to abolish slavery.

Two famous French governors were the Vicomte de Souillac, who constructed the Chaussée in Port Louis and encouraged farmers to settle in the district of Savanne, and Antoine Bruni d'Entrecasteaux, who saw to it that the French in the Indian Ocean should have their headquarters in Mauritius instead of Pondicherry in India. Charles Mathieu Isidore Decaen was a successful general in the French Revolutionary Wars and, in some ways, a rival of Napoléon I. He ruled as Governor of Isle de France and Réunion from 1803 to 1810.

British naval cartographer and explorer Matthew Flinders was arrested and detained by General Decaen on the island from 1803 to 1810, in contravention of an order from Napoléon. During the Napoleonic Wars, Mauritius became a base from which French corsairs organised successful raids on British commercial ships. The raids continued until 1810, when a Royal Navy expedition led by Commodore Josias Rowley, R.N., an Anglo-Irish aristocrat, was sent to capture the island. Despite winning the Battle of Grand Port against the British, the French could not prevent the British from landing at Cap Malheureux three months later. They formally surrendered the island on the fifth day of the invasion, 3 December 1810, on terms allowing settlers to keep their land and property and to use the French language and law of France in criminal and civil matters. Under British rule, the island's name reverted to Mauritius.

=== British Mauritius (1810–1968) ===
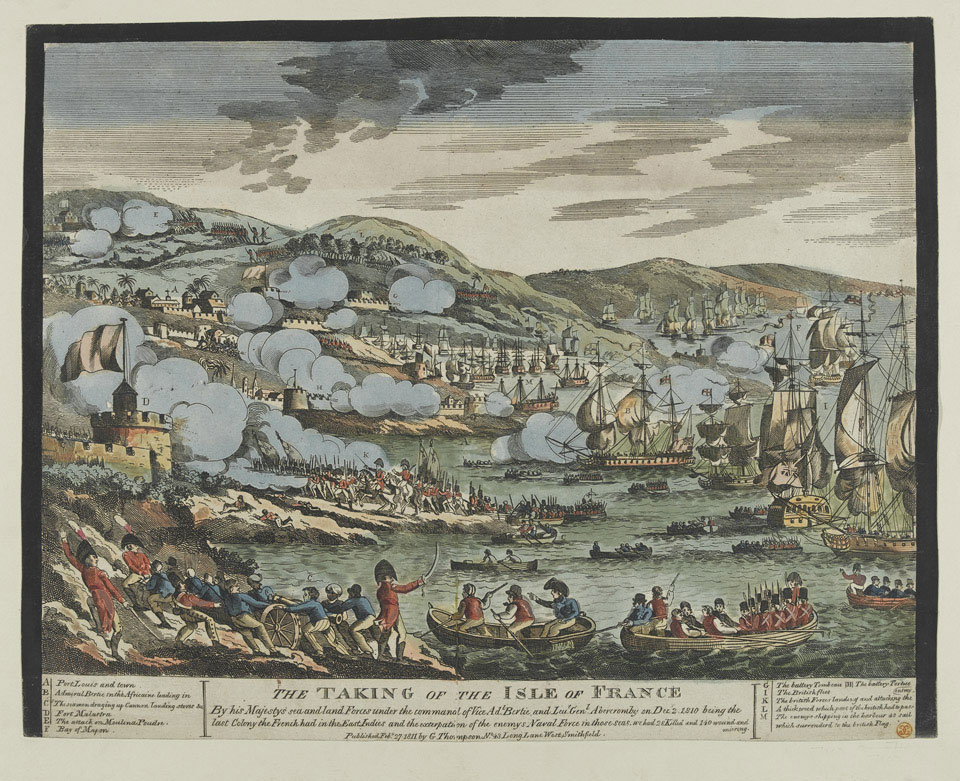
British forces seizing the Isle of France on 2 December 1810

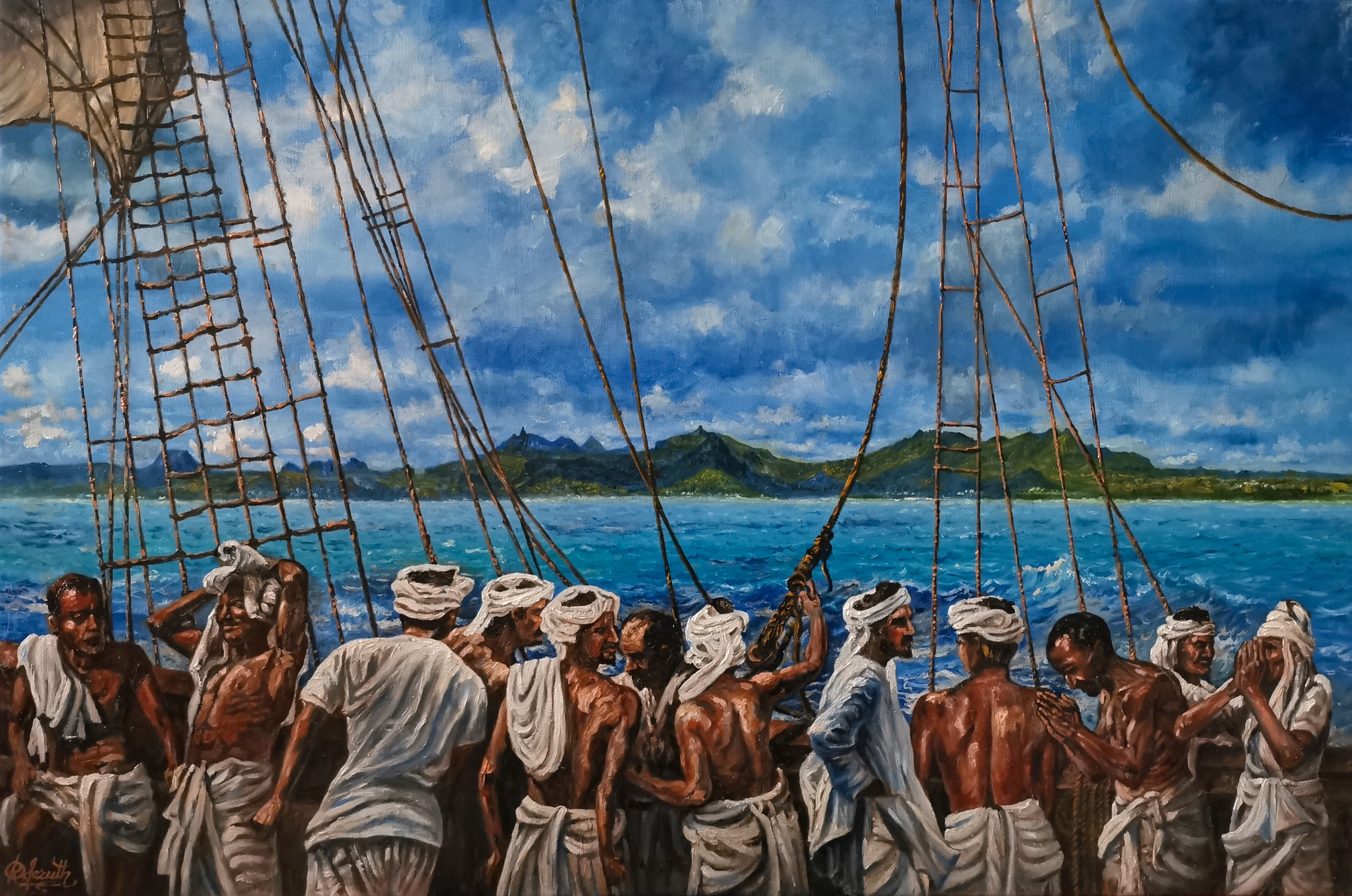
The first indentured Indian workers in 1834

In the 19th century, Mauritius imported and exported convict labour, along with other British colonies. These migrations were caused both by labour shortages, due to the abolition of slavery, and by unmanageably large prison populations, partially attributed to social unrest in India. In 1811, the East India Company briefly stopped penal transportation sentences because, due to reports from returning convicts of indulgent treatment, they were no longer a deterrent to crime. Transport sentences were reinstated two years later due to swelling prison populations resulting partially from growing rebellion and unrest across the realm of the East India Company.

The British administration, which began with Sir Robert Farquhar as its first governor, oversaw rapid social and economic changes. However, it was tainted by the Ratsitatane episode. Ratsitatane, nephew of King Radama of Madagascar, was brought to Mauritius as a political prisoner. He managed to escape from prison and plotted a rebellion that would free the island's slaves. He was betrayed by his associate Laizaf and was caught by a group of militiamen and summarily executed.

In 1832, d'Épinay launched the first Mauritian newspaper (Le Cernéen), which was not controlled by the government. In the same year, there was a move by the procureur-general to abolish slavery without compensation to the slave owners. This gave rise to discontent, and, to check an eventual rebellion, the government ordered all the inhabitants to surrender their arms. A stone fortress, Fort Adelaide, was built on a hill, now known as the Citadel hill, in the centre of Port Louis to quell any uprising. After 1833, slavery was gradually abolished over several years, and the planters ultimately received two million pounds sterling in compensation for the loss of their slaves, who had been imported from Africa and Madagascar during the French occupation.

The abolition of slavery had important effects on Mauritius's society, economy and population. The planters brought a large number of indentured labourers from India to work in the sugar cane fields. Between 1834 and 1921, around half a million indentured labourers were present on the island. They worked on sugar estates, factories, in transport and on construction sites. Additionally, the British brought 8,740 Indian soldiers to the island.

Aapravasi Ghat, in the bay at Port Louis and now a UNESCO site, was the first British colony to serve as a major reception centre for indentured servants. The labourers brought from India were not always fairly treated, and a Frenchman of German origin, Adolphe de Plevitz, made himself the unofficial protector of these immigrants. In 1871 he helped them to write a petition that was sent to Governor Gordon. A commission was appointed and recommended several measures that would affect the lives of Indian labourers during the next fifty years.

In 1885, a new constitution was introduced. It was referred to as Cens Démocratique and it incorporated some of the principles advocated by one of the Creole leaders, Onésipho Beaugeard. It created elected positions in the Legislative Council – although the franchise was restricted mainly to the white French and fair-skinned Indian elite who owned real estate. In 1886, Governor John Pope Hennessy nominated Gnanadicarayen Arlanda as the first ever Indo-Mauritian member of the ruling council – despite the sugar oligarchy's preference for rival Indo-Mauritian Emile Sandapa. Arlanda served until 1891. In 1903, motorcars were introduced in Mauritius, and in 1910, the first taxis came into service. The electrification of Port Louis took place in 1909, and in the same decade the Mauritius Hydro Electric Company of the Atchia Brothers was authorised to provide power to the towns of upper Plaines Wilhems.

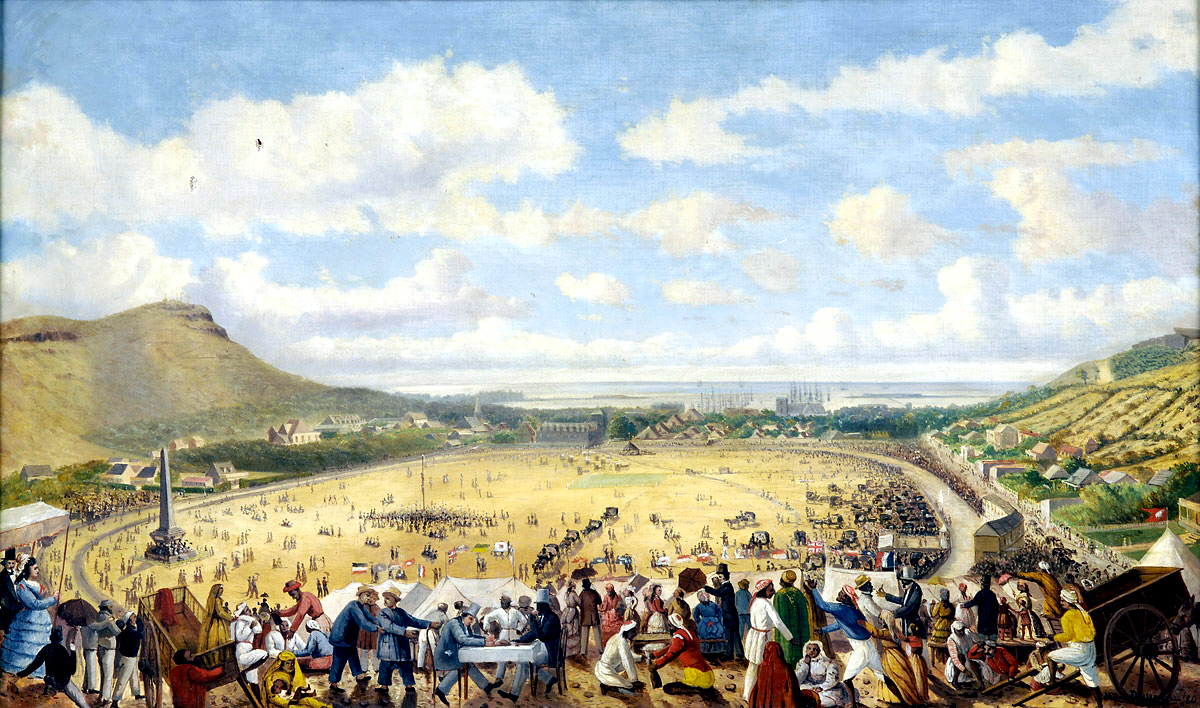
Champ de Mars Racecourse, Port Louis, 1880

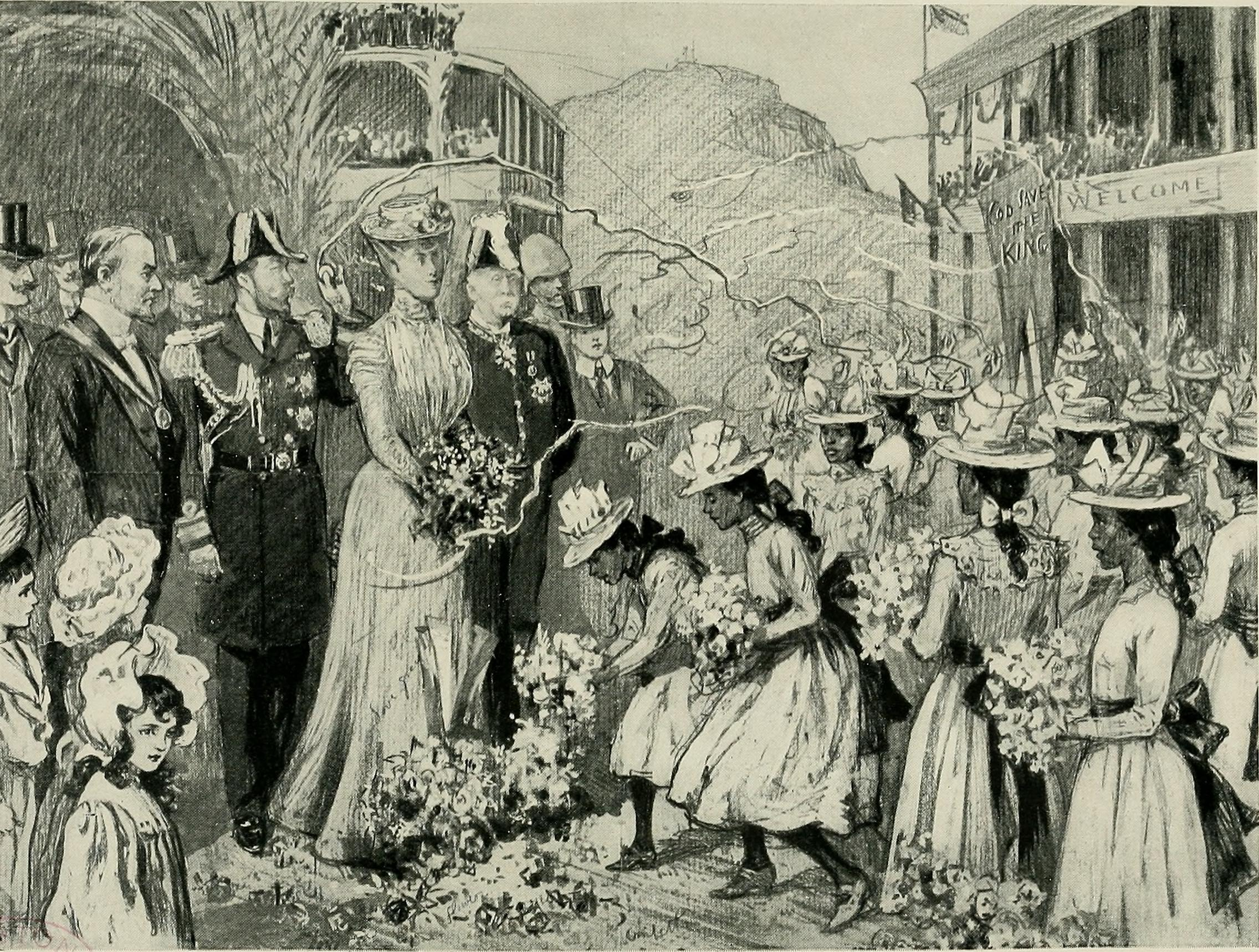
The visit of the Duke and Duchess of Cornwall and York, later King George V and Queen Mary, to Mauritius, 1901

The 1910s were a period of political agitation. The rising middle class (made up of doctors, lawyers, and teachers) began to challenge the political power of the sugar cane landowners. Eugène Laurent, mayor of Port Louis, was the leader of this new group; his party, Action Libérale, demanded that more people should be allowed to vote in the elections. Action Libérale was opposed by the Parti de l'Ordre, led by Henri Leclézio, the most influential of the sugar magnates.

In 1911, there were riots in Port Louis due to a false rumour that Laurent had been murdered by the oligarchs in Curepipe. This became known as the 1911 Curepipe riots. Shops and offices were damaged in the capital, and one person was killed. In the same year, 1911, the first public cinema shows took place in Curepipe, and, in the same town, a stone building was erected to house the Royal College. In 1912, a wider telephone network came into service, used by the government, business firms, and a few private households.

World War I broke out in August 1914. Many Mauritians volunteered to fight in Europe against the Germans and in Mesopotamia against the Turks. But the war affected Mauritius much less than the wars of the eighteenth century. In fact, the 1914–1918 war was a period of great prosperity, due to a boom in sugar prices. In 1919, the Mauritius Sugar Syndicate came into being, which included 70% of all sugar producers.

The 1920s saw the rise of a "retrocessionism" movement, which favoured the retrocession of Mauritius to France. The movement rapidly collapsed because none of the candidates who wanted Mauritius to be given back to France were elected in the 1921 elections. In the post-war recession, there was a sharp drop in sugar prices. Many sugar estates closed down, marking the end of an era for the sugar magnates, who had controlled the economy and the political life of Mauritius.

From the end of Arlanda's term in 1891, until 1926, there had been no Indo-Mauritian representation in the Legislative Council. At the 1926 elections, Dunputh Lallah and Rajcoomar Gujadhur became the first Indo-Mauritians to be elected to the Legislative Council. At Grand Port, Lallah won over rivals Fernand Louis Morel and Gaston Gebert; at Flacq, Gujadhur defeated Pierre Montocchio. 1936 saw the birth of the Labour Party, launched by Maurice Curé. Emmanuel Anquetil rallied the urban workers while Pandit Sahadeo concentrated on the rural working class.

The Uba riots of 1937 resulted in reforms by the local British government that improved labour conditions and led to the un-banning of labour unions. Labour Day was celebrated for the first time in 1938. More than 30,000 workers sacrificed a day's wage and came from all over the island to attend a giant meeting at the Champ de Mars. Following the dockers' strikes, trade unionist Emmanuel Anquetil was deported to Rodrigues, Maurice Curé and Pandit Sahadeo were placed under house arrest, whilst numerous strikers were jailed. Governor Sir Bede Clifford assisted Mr Jules Leclezio of the Mauritius Sugar Syndicate to counter the effects of the strike by using alternative workers known as 'black legs'.

At the outbreak of World War II in 1939, many Mauritians volunteered to serve under the British flag in Africa and the Near East, fighting against the German and Italian armies. Mauritius served as a settlement destination for Jews deported from the Holy Land.

Mauritius was never really threatened, but in 1943, several British ships were sunk outside Port Louis by German submarines. In the initial stages of the war, locally recruited military formations were raised in order to defend the country in case the British imperial troops had to leave. On 24 March 1943, the Mauritius Regiment, was created as an imperial unit and a new subsidiary of the East Africa Command (EAC). In late 1943, the 1st Battalion of the Mauritius Regiment (1MR) was sent to Madagascar for training, and in their place a battalion of the King's African Rifles (KAR) was stationed in Mauritius. The dispatch of the 1MR proved to be politically unpopular on the basis of some troops resenting conscription and the battalion overseas comprising solely non-white troops, exacerbating racial tensions in the country. The 1MR troops were further aggrieved at the segregation they were subject to, unequal pay, physically demanding training, and were fearful of the Japanese soldiers, all these factors culminated in the 1MR mutinying.

During World War II, conditions were hard in the country; the prices of commodities doubled but workers' salaries increased only by 10 to 20 percent. There was civil unrest, and the colonial government censored all trade union activities. However, the labourers of Belle Vue Harel Sugar Estate went on strike on 27 September 1943. Police officers eventually fired directly at the crowd, resulting in the deaths of four labourers. This became known as the 1943 Belle Vue Harel Massacre. Social worker and leader of the Jan Andolan movement Basdeo Bissoondoyal organised the funeral ceremonies of the four dead labourers. Three months later, on 12 December 1943, Bissoondoyal organised a mass gathering at "Marie Reine de la Paix" in Port Louis, and the significant crowd of workers from all over the island confirmed the popularity of the Jan Andolan movement.

After the proclamation of the 1947 Constitution of Mauritius, the general elections were held on 9 August 1948 – and, for the first time, the colonial government expanded the franchise to all adults who could write their name in one of the island's 19 languages, abolishing the previous gender and property qualifications. Guy Rozemont's Labour Party won the majority of the votes with 11 of the 19 elected seats won by Hindus. The Governor-General Donald Mackenzie-Kennedy appointed 12 Conservatives to the Legislative Council on 23 August 1948 to perpetuate the predominance of white Franco-Mauritians.

In 1948, Emilienne Rochecouste became the first woman to be elected to the Legislative Council. Guy Rozemont's party bettered its position in 1953, and, on the strength of the election results, demanded universal suffrage. Constitutional conferences were held in London in 1955 and 1957, and the ministerial system was introduced. Voting took place for the first time on the basis of universal adult suffrage on 9 March 1959. The general election was again won by the Labour Party, led this time by Sir Seewoosagur Ramgoolam.

A Constitutional Review Conference was held in London in 1961, and a programme of further constitutional advance was established. The 1963 election was won by the Labour Party and its allies. The Colonial Office noted that politics of a communal nature was gaining ground in Mauritius and that the choice of candidates (by parties) and the voting behaviour (of electors) were governed by ethnic and caste considerations. Around that time, two eminent British academics, Richard Titmuss and James Meade, published a report of the island's social problems caused by overpopulation and the monoculture of sugar cane. This led to an intense campaign to halt the population explosion, and the decade registered a sharp decline in population growth.

In early 1965, a political assassination took place in the suburb of Belle-Rose, in the town of Quatre Bornes, where Labour activist Rampersad Surath was beaten to death by thugs of rival party Parti Mauricien. On 10 May 1965, racial riots broke out in the village of Trois Boutiques near Souillac and progressed to the historic village of Mahébourg. A nationwide state of emergency was declared on the whole British colony. The riot was initiated by the murder of Police Constable Beesoo in his vehicle by a Creole gang. This was followed by the murder of a civilian named Mr. Robert Brousse in Trois Boutiques. The Creole gang then proceeded to the coastal historic village of Mahébourg to assault the Indo-Mauritian spectators who were watching a Hindustani movie at Cinéma Odéon. Mahébourg police recorded nearly 100 complaints of assaults on Indo-Mauritians.

=== Independence and constitutional monarchy (1968–1992) ===
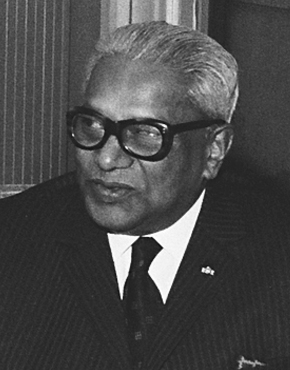
Sir Seewoosagur Ramgoolam, the first Prime Minister of Mauritius

At the Lancaster Conference of 1965, it became clear that Britain wanted to relieve itself of the colony of Mauritius. In 1959, Harold Macmillan had made his famous "Wind of Change Speech" in which he acknowledged that the best option for Britain was to give complete independence to its colonies. Thus, since the late fifties, the way was paved for independence.

Later in 1965, after the Lancaster Conference, the Chagos Archipelago was excised from the territory of Mauritius to form the British Indian Ocean Territory (BIOT). A general election took place on 7 August 1967, and the Independence Party obtained the majority of seats. In January 1968, six weeks before the declaration of independence the 1968 Mauritian riots occurred in Port Louis, leading to the deaths of 25 people.

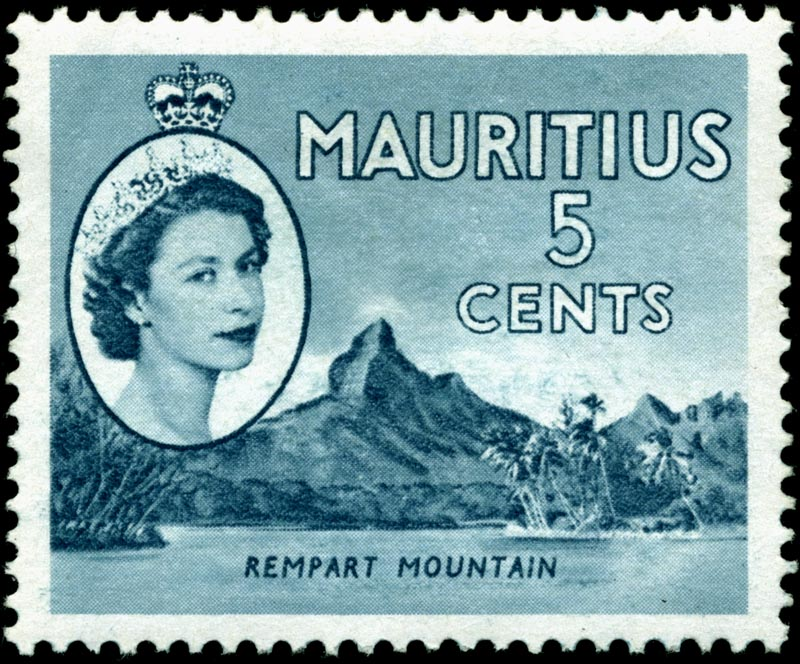
Elizabeth II was the Queen of Mauritius from 1968 to 1992.

Mauritius adopted a new constitution, and independence was proclaimed on 12 March 1968. Sir Seewoosagur Ramgoolam became the first prime minister of an independent Mauritius – with Queen Elizabeth II remaining head of state as Queen of Mauritius.

In 1969, the opposition party, Mauritian Militant Movement (MMM), was founded, led by Paul Bérenger. Later, in 1971, the MMM – backed by unions – called a series of strikes in the port, which caused a state of emergency in the country.

The coalition government of the Labour Party and the PMSD (Parti Mauricien Social Démocrate) reacted by curtailing civil liberties and curbing freedom of the press. Two unsuccessful apparent assassination attempts were made against Paul Bérenger in 1971, killing his supporter Fareed Muttur and dock worker and activist Azor Adélaïde. General elections were postponed and public meetings were prohibited. Members of the MMM, including Paul Bérenger, were imprisoned on 23 December 1971. The MMM leader was released a year later.

In 1973, Mauritius became the first country in Africa to be declared malaria-free. Malaria had once forced a significant portion of the population to move from the coastal regions to the Central Plateau in the late 19th century.

In May 1975, a protest of high school and university students swept across the country. The students were unsatisfied with an education system that did not meet their aspirations, and that gave limited prospects for future employment. On 20 May, thousands of students tried to enter Port-Louis over the Grand River North West bridge, and clashed with police. An act of Parliament was passed on 16 December 1975 to extend the right to vote to 18-year-olds.

The next general elections took place on 20 December 1976. The Labour-CAM coalition won only 28 seats out of 62. The MMM secured 34 seats in Parliament but outgoing Prime Minister Sir Seewoosagur Ramgoolam managed to remain in office, with a two-seat majority, after striking an alliance with the PMSD of Gaetan Duval.

In 1981, United States newspapers reported that the Central Intelligence Agency (CIA) was planning a covert operation to support the government of Mauritius as part of CIA strategy in the larger Cold War. According to the Washington Post, citing U.S. government sources, the planned operation was "mainly a quiet CIA effort to slip money" to the Mauritian government. This claim was repeated in a 1987 book by journalist Bob Woodward, who further wrote that the U.S. government feared that Mauritius could become a Soviet naval base if a "pro-Western" government did not remain in power.

In 1982 an MMM-PSM government (led by PM Anerood Jugnauth, Deputy PM Harish Boodhoo and Finance Minister Paul Bérenger) was elected. However, ideological and personality differences emerged within the MMM and PSM leadership. The power struggle between Bérenger and Jugnauth peaked in March 1983. Jugnauth travelled to New Delhi to attend the 7th Summit of the Non-Aligned Movement summit; on his return, Bérenger proposed constitutional changes that would strip power from the Prime Minister. At Jugnauth's request, PM Indira Gandhi of India planned an armed intervention involving the Indian Navy and Indian Army to prevent a coup under the code name Operation Lal Dora.

The MMM-PSM government split up nine months after the June 1982 election. According to an Information Ministry official the nine months was a "socialist experiment". Harish Boodhoo dissolved his Parti Socialiste Mauricien to enable all PSM parliamentarians to join Jugnauth's new party, the Mouvement Socialiste Mauricien (MSM), thus remaining in power whilst distancing themselves from MMM. The MSM-Labour-PMSD coalition was victorious at the August 1983 elections, resulting in Anerood Jugnauth as PM and Gaëtan Duval as Deputy PM.

That period saw growth in the EPZ (Export Processing Zone) sector. Industrialisation began to spread to villages as well, and attracted young workers from all ethnic communities. As a result, the sugar industry began to lose its hold on the economy. Large retail chains began opening stores in 1985 and offered credit facilities to low-income earners, thus allowing them to afford basic household appliances. There was also a boom in the tourism industry, and new hotels sprang up throughout the island. In 1989 the stock exchange opened its doors, and in 1992, the freeport began operation. In 1990, the Prime Minister lost the vote on changing the Constitution to make the country a republic with Bérenger as president.

=== Republic (since 1992) ===
On 12 March 1992, Mauritius was proclaimed a republic within the Commonwealth of Nations and the monarch removed as head of state. The last Governor-General of Mauritius, Sir Veerasamy Ringadoo, became the first President. This was under a transitional arrangement, in which he was replaced by Cassam Uteem later that year. Executive authority remained under the prime ministership.

Despite an improvement in the economy, which coincided with a fall in the price of petrol and a favourable dollar exchange rate, the government did not enjoy full popularity. As early as 1984, there was discontent. Through the Newspapers and Periodicals Amendment Act, the government tried to make every newspaper provide a bank guarantee of half a million rupees. Forty-three journalists protested by participating in a public demonstration in Port Louis, in front of Parliament. They were arrested and freed on bail. This caused a public outcry and the government had to review its policy.

There was also dissatisfaction in the education sector. There were not enough high-quality secondary colleges to answer the growing demand of primary school leavers who had got through their CPE (Certificate of Primary Education). In 1991, a master plan for education failed to get national support and contributed to the government's downfall.

In December 1995, Navin Ramgoolam was elected as PM of the Labour–MMM alliance. In October 1996, the triple murder of political activists at Gorah-Issac Street in Port Louis led to several arrests and a long investigation.

The year 1999 was marked by civil unrest and riots in February and then in May. Following the Kaya riots, President Cassam Uteem and Cardinal Jean Margéot toured the country and calm was restored after four days of turmoil. A commission of enquiry was set up to investigate the root causes of the social disturbance. The resulting report delved into the cause of poverty and qualified many tenacious beliefs as perceptions. In January 2000, political activist Rajen Sabapathee was shot dead after he escaped from La Bastille jail.

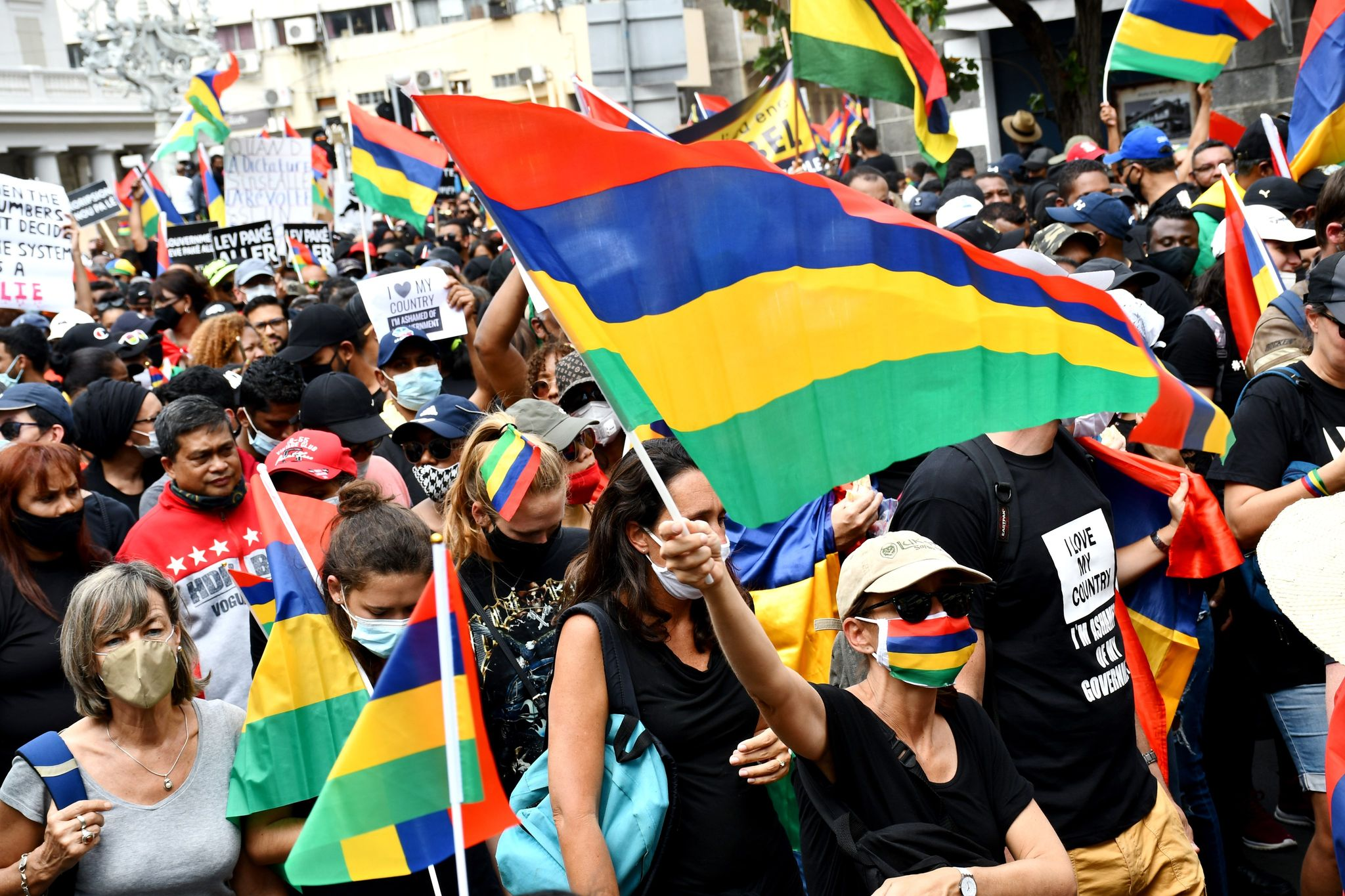
Perceived failure of the government to respond promptly and effectively to the MV Wakashio oil spill resulted in anti-government protests.

Sir Anerood Jugnauth of the MSM returned to power in September 2000 after securing an alliance with the MMM. In 2002, the island of Rodrigues became an autonomous entity within the republic and was thus able to elect its own representatives to administer the island. In 2003, the prime ministership was transferred to Paul Bérenger of the MMM, and Sir Anerood Jugnauth became president. Bérenger was the first Franco-Mauritian Prime Minister in the country's post-Independence history.

In the 2005 elections, Navin Ramgoolam became PM under the new coalition of Labour–PMXD–VF–MR–MMSM. In the 2010 elections the Labour–MSM–PMSD alliance secured power and Navin Ramgoolam remained PM until 2014.

The MSM–PMSD–ML coalition was victorious at the 2014 elections under Anerood Jugnauth's leadership. Despite disagreements within the ruling alliance that led to the departure of PMSD, the MSM–ML stayed in power for their full 5-year term.

On 21 January 2017, Sir Anerood Jugnauth announced his resignation and that his son and Finance Minister Pravind Jugnauth would assume the office of prime minister. The transition took place as planned on 23 January 2017.

In 2018, Mauritian president Ameenah Gurib-Fakim resigned over a financial scandal.

In the November 2019 Mauritius general elections, the ruling Militant Socialist Movement (MSM) won more than half of the seats in parliament, securing incumbent Prime Minister Pravind Kumar Jugnauth a new five-year term. Prithvirajsing Roopun became president in December 2019.

On 25 July 2020, Japanese-owned bulk carrier MV Wakashio ran aground on a coral reef off the coast of Mauritius, leaking up to 1,000 tonnes of heavy oil into a pristine lagoon. Its location on the edge of protected fragile marine ecosystems and a wetland of international importance made the MV Wakashio oil spill one of the worst environmental disasters ever to hit the western Indian Ocean.

On 10 November 2024, the opposition coalition, Alliance du Changement, won 60 of the 64 seats in the Mauritian general election. Its leader, former prime minister Navin Ramgoolam, became new prime minister.

== Geography ==
The total land area of the country is 2,040 km^{2} (790 sq mi). It is the 170th largest nation in the world by size. The Republic of Mauritius comprises Mauritius Island and several outlying islands. The nation's exclusive economic zone covers about 2.3 million square kilometres (670,000 sq nmi; 890,000 sq mi) of the Indian Ocean, including approximately 400,000 km^{2} (150,000 sq mi) jointly managed with the Seychelles.

=== Mauritius Island ===
Mauritius is 1,100 nautical miles (2,000 km; 1,300 mi) off the southeast coast of Africa, between latitudes 19°58.8'S and 20°31.7'S and longitudes 57°18.0'E and 57°46.5'E. It is 65 km (40 mi) long and 45 km (30 mi) wide. Its land area is 1,864.8 km^{2} (720.0 sq mi). The island is surrounded by more than 150 km (100 mi) of white sandy beaches, and the lagoons are protected from the open sea by the world's third-largest coral reef, which surrounds the island. Just off the Mauritian coast lie some 49 uninhabited islands and islets, several of which have been declared natural reserves for endangered species.

Mauritius Island (Mauritian Creole: Lil Moris; French: Île Maurice, pronounced [il moʁis]) is relatively young geologically, having been created by volcanic activity some 8 million years ago. Together with Saint Brandon, Réunion, and Rodrigues, the island is part of the Mascarene Islands. These islands emerged as a result of gigantic underwater volcanic eruptions that happened thousands of kilometres to the east of the continental block made up of Africa and Madagascar. They are no longer volcanically active and the hotspot now rests under Réunion Island.

Mauritius is encircled by a broken ring of mountain ranges, varying in height from 300 to 800 metres (1,000 to 2,600 ft) above sea level. The land rises from coastal plains to a central plateau where it reaches a height of 670 m (2,200 ft). The highest peak is in the south-west, Piton de la Petite Rivière Noire at 828 metres (2,717 ft). Streams and rivers speckle the island, many formed in the cracks created by lava flows.

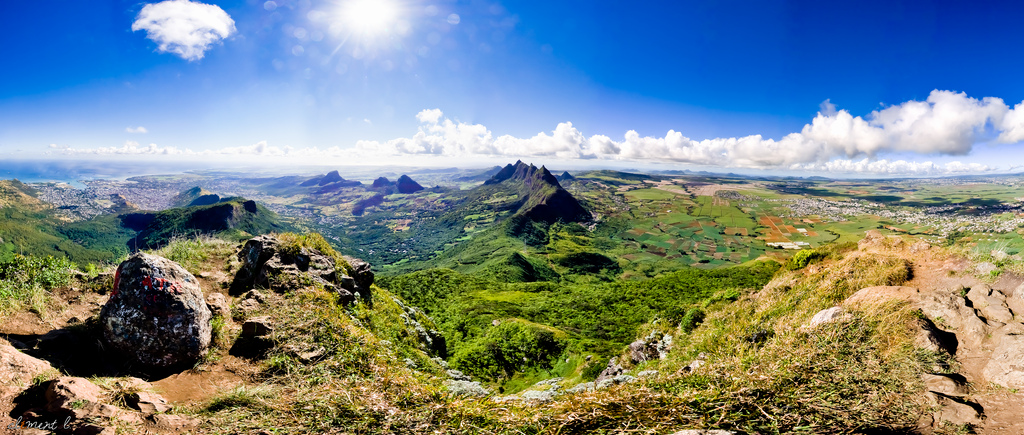
A panoramic view of Mauritius Island

=== Rodrigues Island ===
The autonomous island of Rodrigues is located 300 nautical miles (560 km; 350 mi) to the east of Mauritius, with an area 108 km^{2} (42 sq mi). Rodrigues is a volcanic island rising from a ridge along the edge of the Mascarene Plateau. The island is hilly with a central spine culminating in the highest peak, Mont Limon at 398 m (1,306 ft). The island also has a coral reef and extensive limestone deposits. According to Statistics Mauritius, at 1 July 2019, the population of the island was estimated at 43,371.

=== Chagos Archipelago ===
The Chagos Archipelago is composed of atolls and islands, and is located approximately 1,188 nautical miles (2,200 km; 1,367 mi) north-east of the main island of Mauritius. The islands form the British Indian Ocean Territory and were set to be transferred to Mauritius in 2026. A treaty was signed on 22 May 2025, and the UK stopped the bill in April 2026 because it could not agree with the US. Both governments say they are working towards a solution.

The north of the Chagos Archipelago consist of Peros Banhos, the Salomon Islands and Nelsons Island; to the south-west are The Three Brothers, Eagle Islands, Egmont Islands and Danger Island. Diego Garcia is in the south-east of the archipelago. In 2016, the Chagossian population was estimated at 8,700 in Mauritius, including 483 natives; 350 Chagossians live in the Seychelles, including 75 natives, while 3,000, including 127 natives, live in the UK (the population having grown from the 1200 Chagossians who moved there).

=== St. Brandon ===
St. Brandon, also known as the Cargados Carajos shoals, is located 217 nautical miles (402 km; 250 mi) northeast of Mauritius Island. Saint Brandon is an archipelago composed of the remnants of the lost micro continent of Mauritia. It consists of five island groups, with between 28 and 40 islands in total, depending on seasonal storms, cyclones, and related sand movements. In 2008, the Privy Council (United Kingdom) judgment confirmed Raphaël Fishing Company as "the holder of a Permanent Grant of the thirteen islands mentioned in the 1901 Deed (transcribed in Vol TB25 No 342) subject to the conditions therein referred to". In 2002, St. Brandon was classified in 10th place globally by UNESCO for inclusion as a World Heritage Site well ahead of any other Mauritian candidates at the time.

In May 2024, the Saint Brandon Conservation Trust was launched internationally at the Corporate Council on Africa in Dallas, Texas. The trust's mission is to protect, restore and conserve St. Brandon.

=== Agaléga Islands ===
The twin islands of Agaléga are located some 500 nautical miles (930 km; 580 mi) to the north of Mauritius. Its North Island is 12.5 km (7.8 mi) long and 1.5 km (0.93 mi) wide, while its South Island is 7 by 4.5 km (4.3 by 2.8 mi). The total area of both islands is 26 km^{2} (10 sq mi). According to Statistics Mauritius, at 1 July 2019, the population of Agaléga and St. Brandon was estimated at 274.

=== Tromelin ===
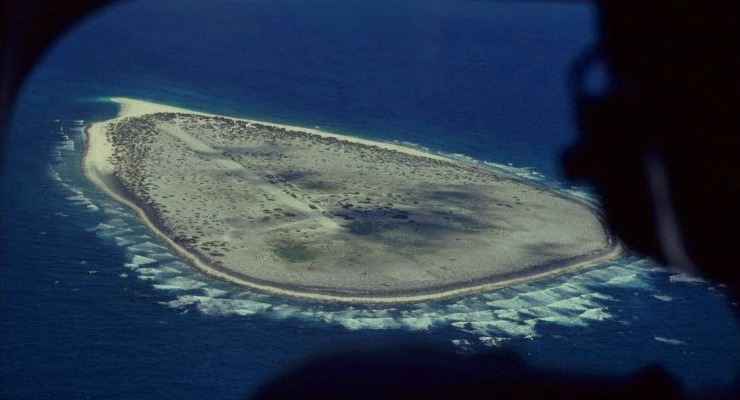
An aerial view of Tromelin Island

Tromelin Island lies 230 nautical miles (430 km; 260 mi) north-west of Mauritius. Mauritius claims sovereignty over Tromelin island, though it is registered as a part of France.

The French took control of Mauritius in 1715, renaming it Isle de France. In May 1814, France ceded Mauritius including all its dependencies to Britain through the Treaty of Paris, and in which Réunion was returned to France. The British Colony of Mauritius consisted of the main island of Mauritius along with its dependencies Rodrigues, Agaléga, St. Brandon, Tromelin (disputed) and the Chagos Archipelago. The Seychelles became a separate colony in 1906.

It is disputed whether the transfer of Isle de France, as Mauritius was previously known under French rule, and its dependencies to Britain in 1814 included Tromelin island. Article 8 of the Treaty of Paris stipulate the cession by France to Britain of Isle de France "and its dependencies, namely Rodrigues and the Seychelles". France considers that the sovereignty of Tromelin island was never transferred to Britain. Mauritius's claim is based on the fact that the transfer of Isle de France and its dependencies to Britain in 1814 was general in nature, that it was beyond those called out in the Treaty of Paris, and that all the dependencies of Isle de France were not specifically mentioned in the Treaty.

Mauritius's claim is that since Tromelin was a dependency of Isle de France, it was 'de facto' transferred to Britain in 1814. The islands of Agaléga, St Brandon and the Chagos Archipelago were also not specifically mentioned in the Treaty of Paris but became part of the British Colony of Mauritius as they were dependencies of Isle de France at that time. In addition, the British authorities in Mauritius had been taking administrative measures with respect to Tromelin over the years; for instance, British officials granted four guano operating concessions on Tromelin island between 1901 and 1951. In 1959, British officials in Mauritius informed the World Meteorological Organization that it considered Tromelin to be part of its territory. A co-management treaty was reached by France and Mauritius in 2010 but has not been ratified.

== Chagos Archipelago territorial dispute ==
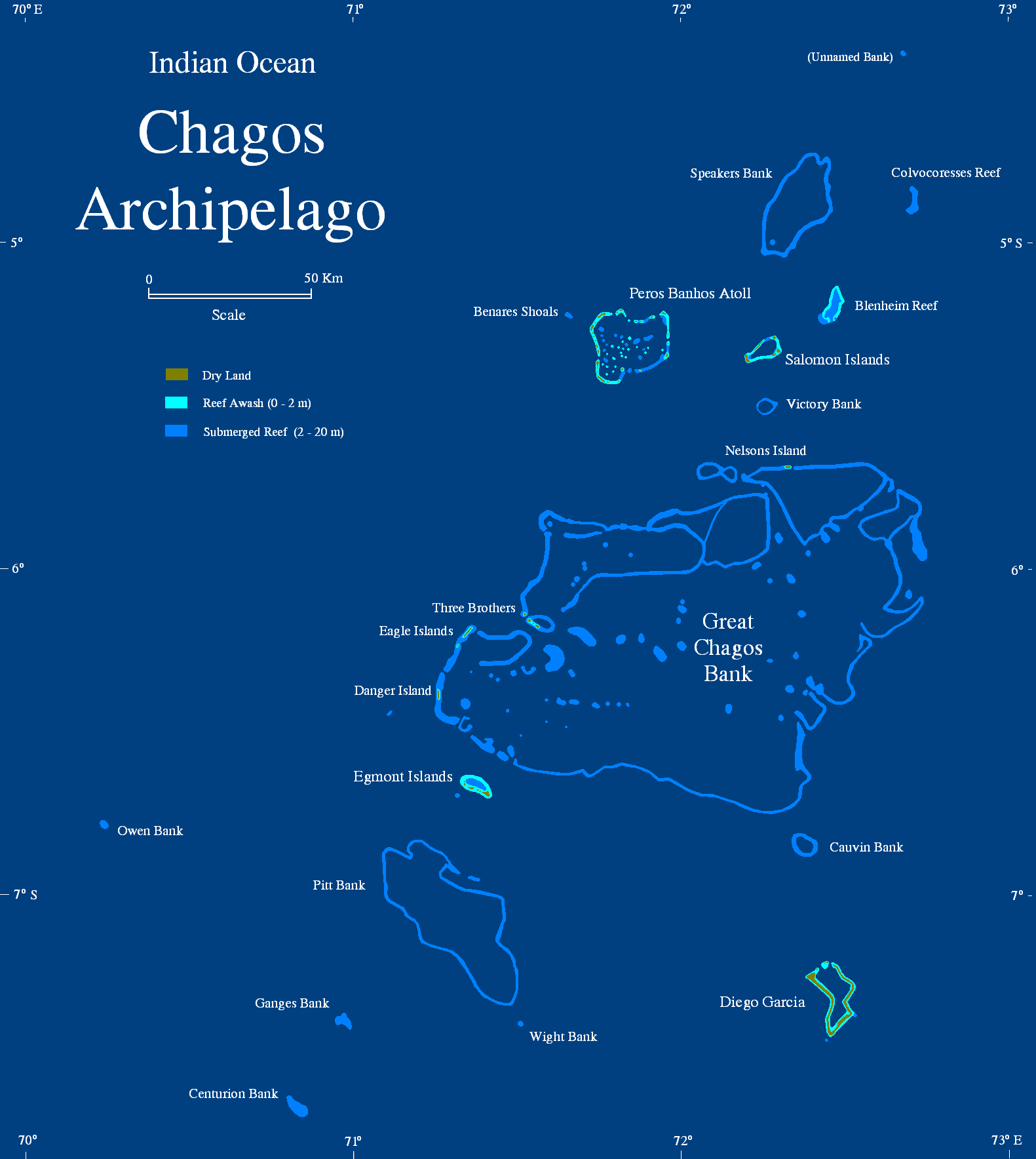
A map of the Chagos Archipelago

Mauritius has long sought sovereignty over the Chagos Archipelago, located 695 nautical miles (1,287 km; 800 mi) to the north-east. Chagos was administratively part of Mauritius from the 18th century when the French first settled the islands. All of the islands forming part of the French colonial territory of Isle de France (as Mauritius was then known) were ceded to the British in 1810 under the Act of Capitulation signed between the two powers.

In 1965, three years before the independence of Mauritius, the United Kingdom split the Chagos Archipelago away from Mauritius, and the islands of Aldabra, Farquhar, and Desroches from the Seychelles, to form the British Indian Ocean Territory. The islands were formally established as an overseas territory of the United Kingdom on 8 November 1965.

In November 1975, during UK-US discussions on the Indian Ocean, the United Kingdom expressed its intention to return the islands of Aldabra, Farquhar, and Desroches to Seychelles to facilitate its peaceful transition to independence by June 1976. Both the UK and the United States acknowledged that these islands could not be used for defense purposes, as they were populated, and forcibly removing inhabitants, as had occurred in the Chagos Archipelago, would be politically unfeasible. On 18 March 1976, the UK and Seychelles signed an agreement to transfer the islands, which officially returned to Seychelles on its Independence Day, 29 June 1976. The BIOT now comprises the Chagos Archipelago only. Under the UK–US Exchange of Notes on the British Indian Ocean Territory, the UK made the main island of the archipelago, Diego Garcia available to the United States for an initial period of 50 years to establish a military base.

In 2016, Britain extended the lease to the US till 2036. Mauritius has repeatedly asserted that the separation of its territories is a violation of United Nations resolutions banning the dismemberment of colonial territories before independence and claims that the Chagos Archipelago, including Diego Garcia, forms an integral part of the territory of Mauritius under both Mauritian law and international law. Between 1968 and 1973, British officials forcibly expelled over 1,000 Chagossians to Mauritius and the Seychelles. As part of the deportation, British officials have been accused of ordering the island's dog population of 1,000 to be gassed. At the United Nations and in statements to its Parliament, the UK stated that there was no "permanent population" in the Chagos Archipelago and described the population as "contract labourers" who were relocated. Since 1971, only the atoll of Diego Garcia is inhabited, home to some 3,000 UK and US military and civilian contracted personnel. Chagossians have since engaged in activism to return to the archipelago, claiming that their forced expulsion and dispossession were illegal.

Mauritius considers the territorial sea of the Chagos Archipelago and Tromelin island as part of its exclusive economic zone.

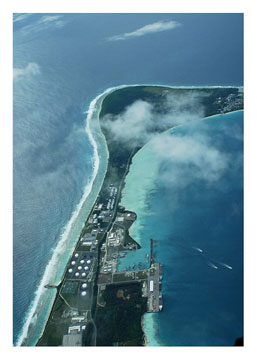
The military base of Camp Justice on Diego Garcia

In December 2010, Mauritius initiated proceedings against the United Kingdom under the United Nations Convention on the Law of the Sea (UNCLOS) to challenge the legality of the Chagos Marine Protected Area (MPA), which the UK purported to declare around the Chagos Archipelago in April 2010. The dispute was arbitrated by the Permanent Court of Arbitration. The Tribunal's decision determined that the UK's undertaking to return the Chagos Archipelago to Mauritius gives Mauritius an interest in significant decisions that bear upon possible future uses of the archipelago.

In February 2019, the judges of the International Court of Justice by thirteen votes to one stated that the United Kingdom is under an obligation to bring to an end its administration of the Chagos Archipelago as rapidly as possible. Only the American judge, Joan Donoghue, voted in favor of the UK. The president of the court, Abdulqawi Ahmed Yusuf, said the detachment of the Chagos Archipelago in 1965 from Mauritius had not been based on a "free and genuine expression of the people concerned." "This continued administration constitutes a wrongful act," he said, adding "The UK has an obligation to bring to an end its administration of the Chagos Archipelago as rapidly as possible and that all member states must co-operate with the United Nations to complete the decolonization of Mauritius."

In May 2019, the United Nations General Assembly debated and adopted a resolution that affirmed that the Chagos Archipelago, which has been occupied by the UK for more than 50 years, "forms an integral part of the territory of Mauritius." The resolution gives effect to an advisory opinion of the International Court of Justice (ICJ), demanded that the UK "withdraw its colonial administration ... unconditionally within a period of no more than six months." 116 states voted in favour of the resolution, 56 abstained and only Australia, Hungary, Israel and Maldives supported the UK and US. During the debate, the Mauritian Prime Minister described the expulsion of Chagossians as "a crime against humanity."

While the resolution is not legally binding, it carries significant political weight since the ruling came from the UN's highest court and the assembly vote reflects world opinion. The resolution also has immediate practical consequences: the UN, its specialised agencies, and all other international organisations are now bound, as a matter of UN law, to support the decolonisation of Mauritius even if the UK claim that it has no doubt about its sovereignty.

In October 2024 it was announced through a joint statement by the UK and Mauritian governments that the archipelago was to have its sovereignty transferred to Mauritius. The island of Diego Garcia, which contains the military base Camp Justice, was the only exception to this new treaty, with administration being leased to the United Kingdom by the Mauritian government for a period of at least 99 years. The transfer agreement was signed in May 2025, with the provision that the island of Diego Garcia would be leased back to the UK for at least 99 years. The UK government expects the treaty to be ratified near the end of 2025.

== Environment and climate ==
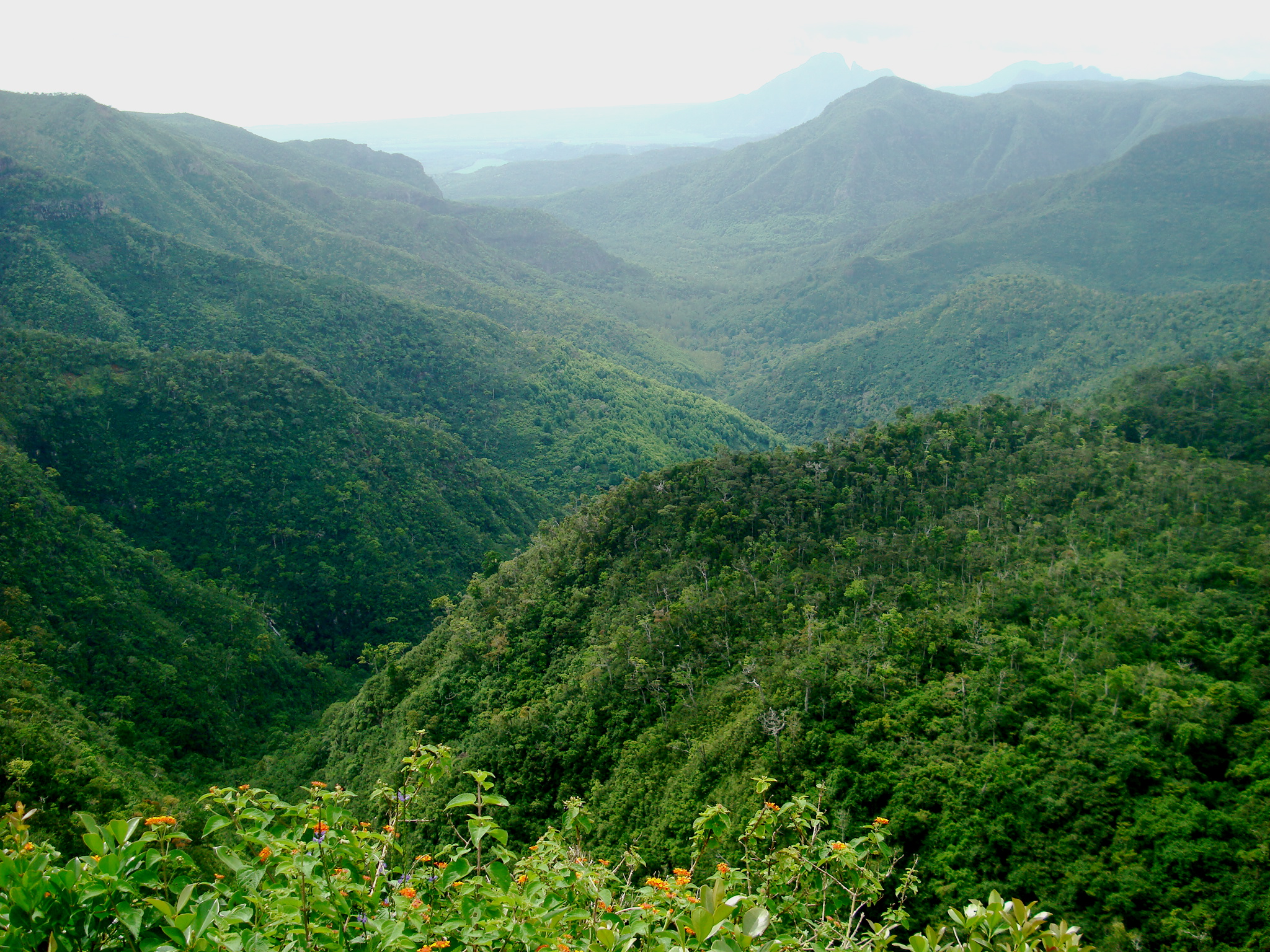
Black River Gorges National Park

The environment in Mauritius is typically tropical in the coastal regions with forests in the mountainous areas. Seasonal cyclones are destructive to its flora and fauna, although they recover quickly. In 2011, Mauritius ranked second in a WTO global air quality index. It had a 2019 Forest Landscape Integrity Index mean score of 5.46/10, ranking it 100th globally out of 172 countries.

Situated near the Tropic of Capricorn, Mauritius has a tropical climate. There are 2 seasons: a warm humid summer from November to April, with a mean temperature of 24.7 °C (76.5 °F) and a relatively cool dry winter from June to September, with a mean temperature of 20.4 °C (68.7 °F). The temperature difference between the seasons is only 4.3 °C (7.7 °F). The warmest months are January and February with average day maximum temperature of 29.2 °C (84.6 °F). The coolest months are July and August with average overnight minimum temperatures of 16.4 °C (61.5 °F).

Annual rainfall ranges from 900 mm (35 in) on the coast to 1,500 mm (59 in) on the central plateau. Although there is no marked rainy season, most of the rainfall occurs in the summer months. Sea temperature in the lagoon varies from 22–27 °C (72–81 °F). The central plateau is much cooler than the surrounding coastal areas and can experience as much as twice the rainfall. The prevailing trade winds keep the east side of the island cooler and bring more rain. Occasional tropical cyclones generally occur between January and March and tend to disrupt the weather for about three days, bringing heavy rain.

Prime Minister Pravind Jugnauth declared an environmental state of emergency after the 25 July 2020 MV Wakashio oil spill. France sent aircraft and specialists from Réunion and Greenpeace said that the leak threatened the survival of thousands of species, who are at "risk of drowning in a sea of pollution". Mauritius is increasingly vulnerable to climate change, facing rising temperatures, sea levels, and more frequent extreme weather events. The island faces stronger tropical cyclones, prolonged droughts, flash floods, landslides, and marine heatwaves which lead to coral bleaching.

Coastal erosion, driven by rising sea levels, threatens infrastructure and freshwater supplies. Climate change is also impacting key sectors such as tourism and fisheries, with significant economic consequences. To adapt, Mauritius is implementing disaster preparedness measures, protecting coastal ecosystems like mangroves, and raising public awareness.

=== Biodiversity ===
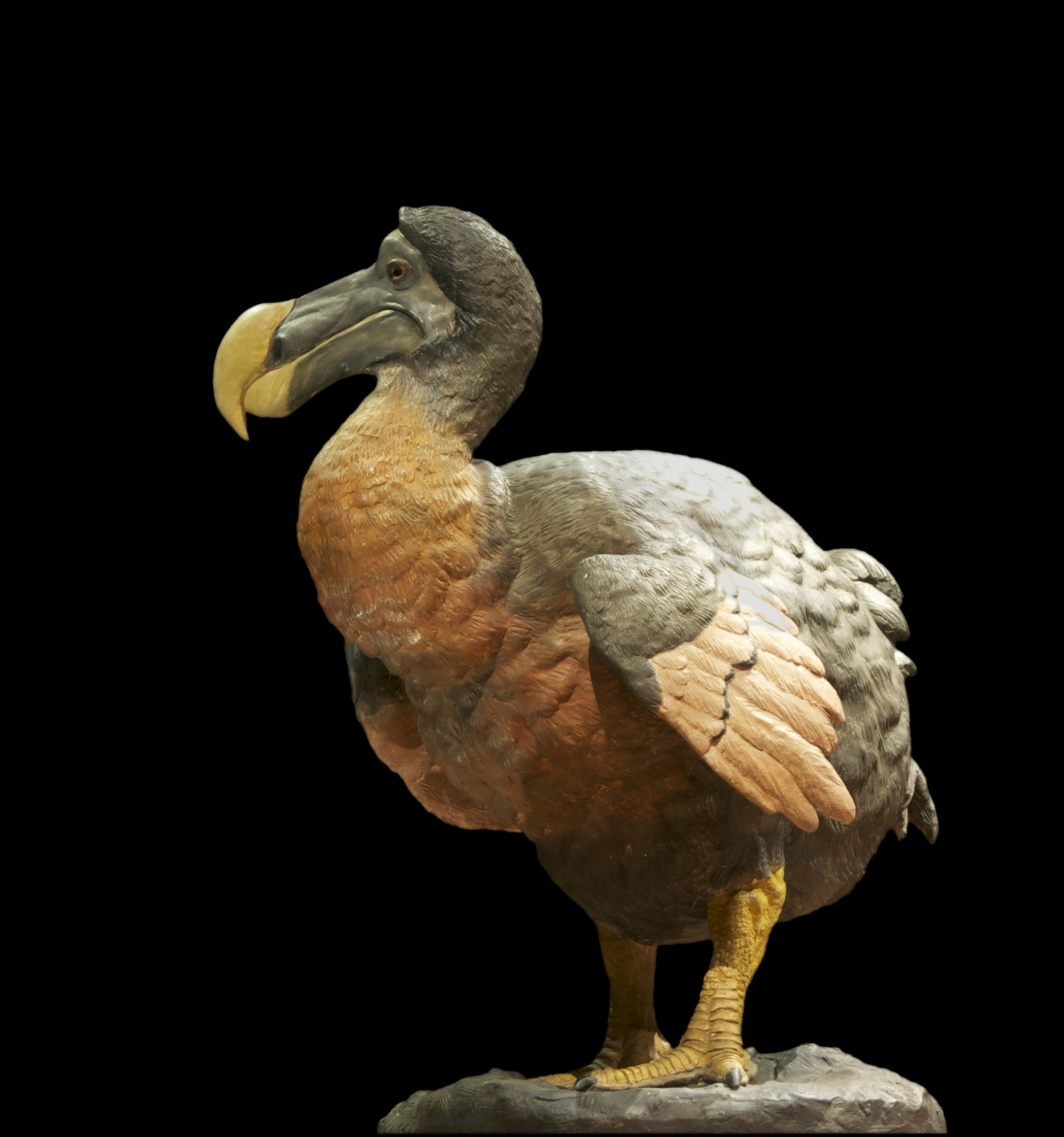
Mauritius was the only known habitat of the extinct dodo, a flightless bird.

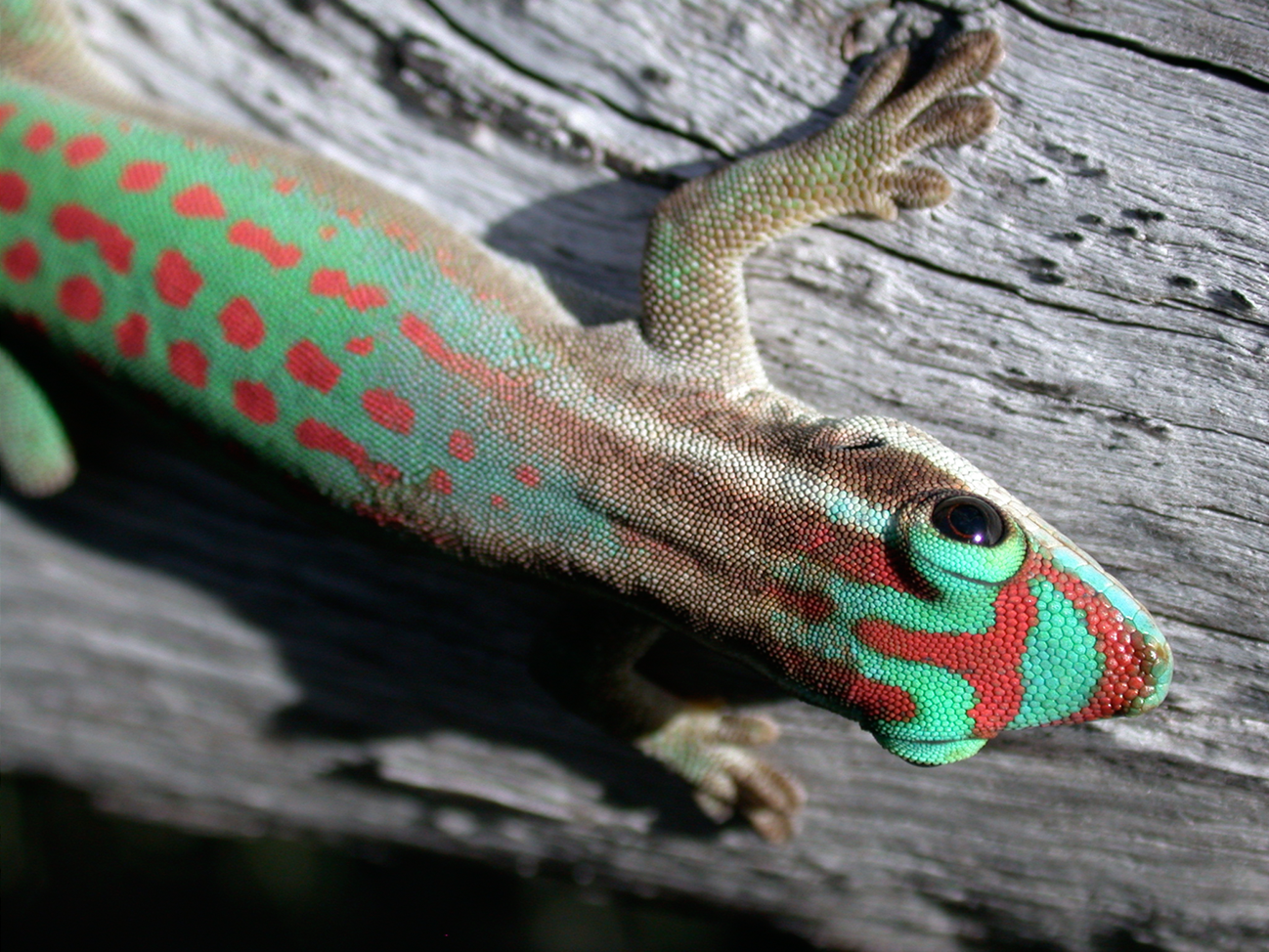
Mauritius ornate day gecko

Mauritius is home to some of the world's rarest plants and animals, but human habitation and the introduction of non-native species have threatened its indigenous flora and fauna. Due to its volcanic origin, age, isolation, and unique terrain, Mauritius is home to a diversity of flora and fauna not usually found in such a small area. Before the Portuguese arrival in 1507, there were no terrestrial mammals on the island. This allowed the evolution of a number of flightless birds and large reptile species. The arrival of humans saw the introduction of invasive alien species, the rapid destruction of habitat and the loss of much of the endemic flora and fauna. In particular, the extinction of the flightless dodo bird, a species unique to Mauritius, has become a representative example of human-driven extinction. The dodo is prominently featured as a heraldic supporter of the national coat of arms of Mauritius.

Less than 2% of the native forest now remains, concentrated in the Black River Gorges National Park in the south-west, the Bambous Mountain Range in the south-east, and the Moka-Port Louis Ranges in the north-west. There are some isolated mountains, Corps de Garde, Le Morne Brabant, and several offshore islands, with remnants of coastal and mainland diversity. Over 100 species of plants and animals have become extinct and many more are threatened. Conservation activities began in the 1980s with the implementation of programmes for the reproduction of threatened bird and plant species as well as habitat restoration in the national parks and nature reserves.

In 2011, the Ministry of Environment & Sustainable Development issued the "Mauritius Environment Outlook Report", which recommended that St. Brandon be declared a Marine protected area. In the President's Report of the Mauritian Wildlife Foundation (MWF) dated March 2016, St Brandon is declared an official MWF project to promote the conservation of the atoll.

The Mauritian flying fox is the only remaining mammal endemic to the island, and has been severely threatened in recent years due to the government sanctioned culling introduced in November 2015 due to the belief that they were a threat to fruit plantations. Prior to 2015 the lack of severe cyclone had seen the fruit bat population increase and the status of the species was then changed by the IUCN from Endangered to Vulnerable in 2014. October 2018, saw the authorisation of the cull of 20% of the fruit bat population, amounting to 13,000 of the estimated 65,000 fruit bats remaining, although their status had already reverted to Endangered due to the previous years' culls.

== Government and politics ==
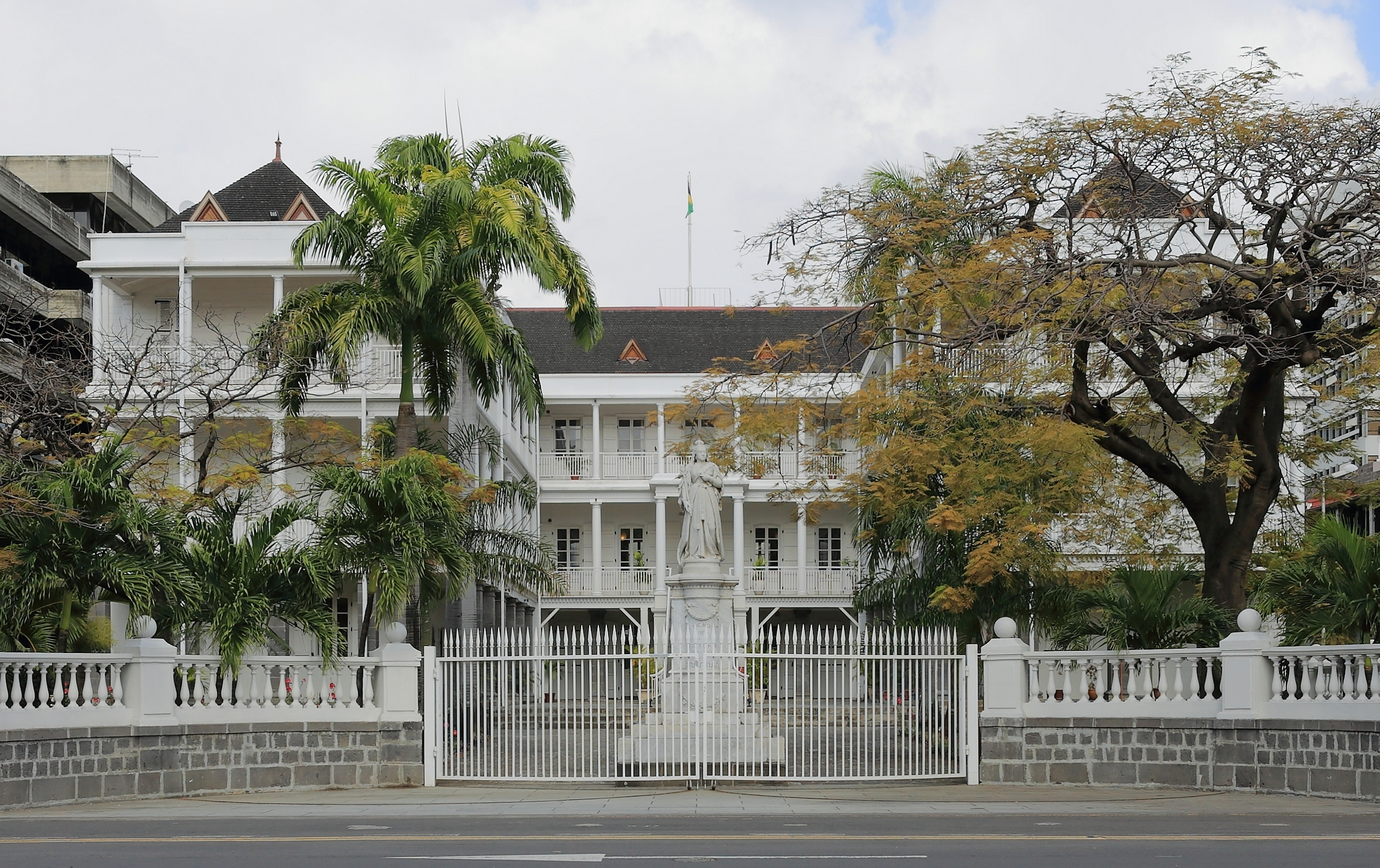
Government House, Port Louis

The politics of Mauritius take place in a framework of a parliamentary representative democratic republic in which the President is the head of state and the Prime Minister is the head of government, assisted by a Council of Ministers. Mauritius has a multi-party system. Executive power is exercised by the Government. Legislative power is vested in both the Government and the National Assembly.

The National Assembly is Mauritius's unicameral legislature, which was called the Legislative Assembly until 1992, when the country became a republic. It consists of 70 members, 62 elected for four-year terms in multi-member constituencies and eight additional members, known as "best losers", appointed by the Electoral Service Commission to ensure that ethnic and religious minorities are equitably represented. The UN Human Rights Committee (UNHRC), which monitors member states' compliance with the International Covenant on Political and Civil Rights (ICPCR), has criticised the country's Best Loser System following a complaint by a local youth and trade union movement. The president is elected for a five-year term by the Parliament.

The island of Mauritius is divided into 20 constituencies that return three members each. The island of Rodrigues is a single district that returns two members.

After a general election, the Electoral Supervisory Commission may nominate up to eight additional members with a view to correct any imbalance in the representation of ethnic minorities in Parliament. This system of nominating members is commonly called the best loser system.

The political party or party alliance that wins the majority of seats in Parliament forms the government. Its leader becomes the prime minister, who selects the Cabinet from elected members of the Assembly, except for the attorney general of Mauritius, who may not be an elected member of the Assembly. The political party or alliance which has the second largest group of representatives forms the Official Opposition and its leader is normally nominated by the president of the republic as the leader of the opposition. The Assembly elects a speaker, a deputy speaker and a deputy chairman of committees as some of its first tasks.

Mauritius is a democracy with a government elected every five years. The most recent National Assembly Election was held on 10 November 2024 in all the 20 mainland constituencies, and in the constituency covering the island of Rodrigues. Elections have tended to be a contest between two major coalitions of parties.

The 2018 Ibrahim Index of African Governance ranked Mauritius first in good governance. In the 2024 Democracy Index compiled by the Economist Intelligence Unit that measures the state of democracy in 167 countries, Mauritius ranked 20th worldwide and is the only African country with "full democracy". The 2026 V-Dem Democracy Report ranked Mauritius 3rd in Africa and classified it as an electoral democracy, an improvement from the previous report.

Office held	Office holder	Incumbency
President	Dharam Gokhool	6 December 2024
Prime Minister	Navin Ramgoolam	12 November 2024
Vice President	Jean Robert Yvan Hungley	6 December 2024
Deputy Prime Minister	Arianne Navarre-Marie	4 May 2026
Chief Justice	Rehana Mungly-Gulbul	18 November 2021
Speaker of the National Assembly	Shirin Aumeeruddy-Cziffra	29 November 2024
Leader of the Opposition	Joe Lesjongard	15 November 2024
Commissioner of Police	Ramparsad Sooroojbally	15 November 2024

=== Administrative subdivisions ===

Mauritius has a single first-order administrative division, the Outer Islands of Mauritius (French: Îles éparses de Maurice), which consists of several outlying islands.

The following are the island-groups in Mauritius:

- Island of Mauritius
- Rodrigues
- Saint Brandon
- Agaléga

The island of Mauritius is subdivided into nine districts, which are the country's second-order administrative divisions.

=== Military ===
All military, police, and security functions in Mauritius are carried out by 10,000 active-duty servicemembers under the Commissioner of Police. The 8,000-member National Police Force is responsible for domestic law enforcement. The 1,400-strong Special Mobile Force (SMF) and the 688-strong coast guard are the only two paramilitary units in Mauritius. Both units are composed of police officers on lengthy rotations to those services. Mauritius also has a special operations group (GIPM) that will intervene in any terrorist attack or high risk operations.

=== Foreign relations ===
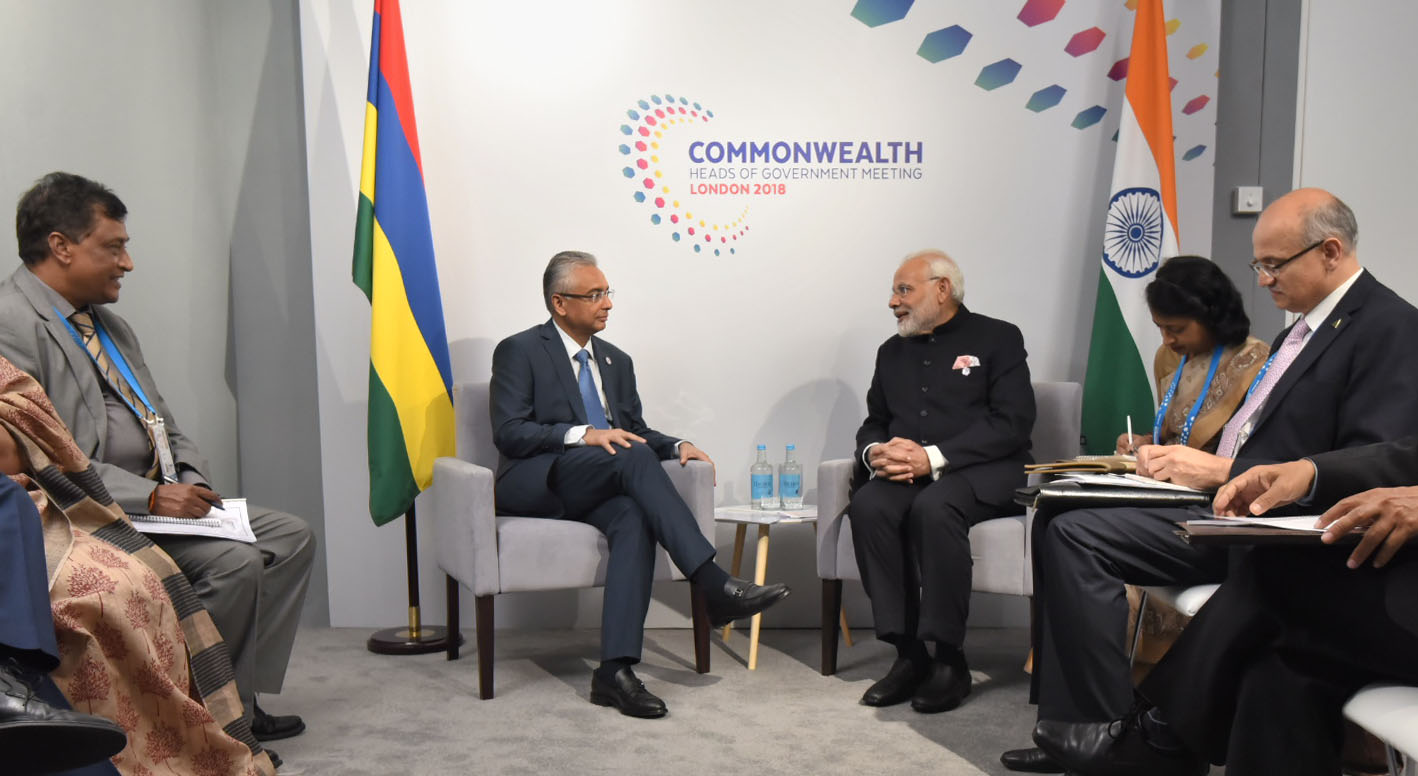
Prime Minister Pravind Jugnauth with Indian Prime Minister Narendra Modi, 19 April 2018

Mauritius has strong and friendly relations with various African, American, Asian, European and Oceanic countries. Mauritius has friendly relations with African states in the region, particularly South Africa, by far its largest continental trading partner. Mauritian investors are gradually entering African markets, notably Madagascar, Mozambique and Zimbabwe. The country's political heritage and dependence on Western markets have led to close ties with the European Union and its member states, particularly France.

Relations with India are very strong for both historical and commercial reasons. Mauritius established diplomatic relations with China in April 1972 and was forced to defend this decision, along with naval contracts with the USSR in the same year. It has also been extending its Middle East outreach with the setting up of an embassy in Saudi Arabia whose Ambassador also doubles as the country's ambassador to Bahrain.

Mauritius is a member of the United Nations, the World Trade Organization, the African Union, the Commonwealth of Nations, La Francophonie, the Southern Africa Development Community, the Indian Ocean Commission, the Common Market for Eastern and Southern Africa, and the Indian Ocean Rim Association.

=== Legal system ===
Mauritius has a hybrid legal system derived from English common law and the French civil law. The Constitution of Mauritius establishes the separation of powers between the legislature, the executive and the judiciary and guarantees the protection of the fundamental rights and freedoms of the individual.

Mauritius has a single-structured judicial system consisting of two tiers, the Supreme Court and subordinate courts. The Supreme Court is composed of various divisions exercising jurisdiction such as the Master's Court, the Family Division, the Commercial Division (Bankruptcy), the Criminal Division, the Mediation Division, the Court of First Instance in civil and criminal proceedings, the Appellate jurisdiction: the Court of Civil Appeal and the Court of Criminal Appeal. Subordinate courts consist of the Intermediate Court, the Industrial Court, the District Courts, the Bail and Remand Court and the Court of Rodrigues.

The Judicial Committee of the Privy Council is the final court of appeal of Mauritius. After the independence of Mauritius in 1968, Mauritius maintained the Privy Council as its highest court of appeal. Appeals to the Judicial Committee from decisions of the Court of Appeal or the Supreme Court may be as of right or with the leave of the Court, as set out in section 81 of the Constitution and section 70A of the Courts Act. The Judicial Committee may also grant special leave to appeal from the decision of any court in any civil or criminal matter as per section 81(5) of the Constitution.

== Demographics ==
Largest cities or towns in Mauritius Source:
Rank	Name	District	Pop.
1	Port Louis	Port Louis	155,226
2	Vacoas-Phoenix	Plaines Wilhems	115,289
3	Beau Bassin-Rose Hill	Plaines Wilhems	111,355
4	Curepipe	Plaines Wilhems	78,618
5	Quatre Bornes	Plaines Wilhems	77,308
6	Triolet	Pamplemousses	23,269
7	Goodlands	Rivière du Rempart	20,910
8	Centre de Flacq	Flacq	17,710
9	Bel Air Rivière Sèche	Flacq	17,671
10	Mahébourg	Grand Port	17,042

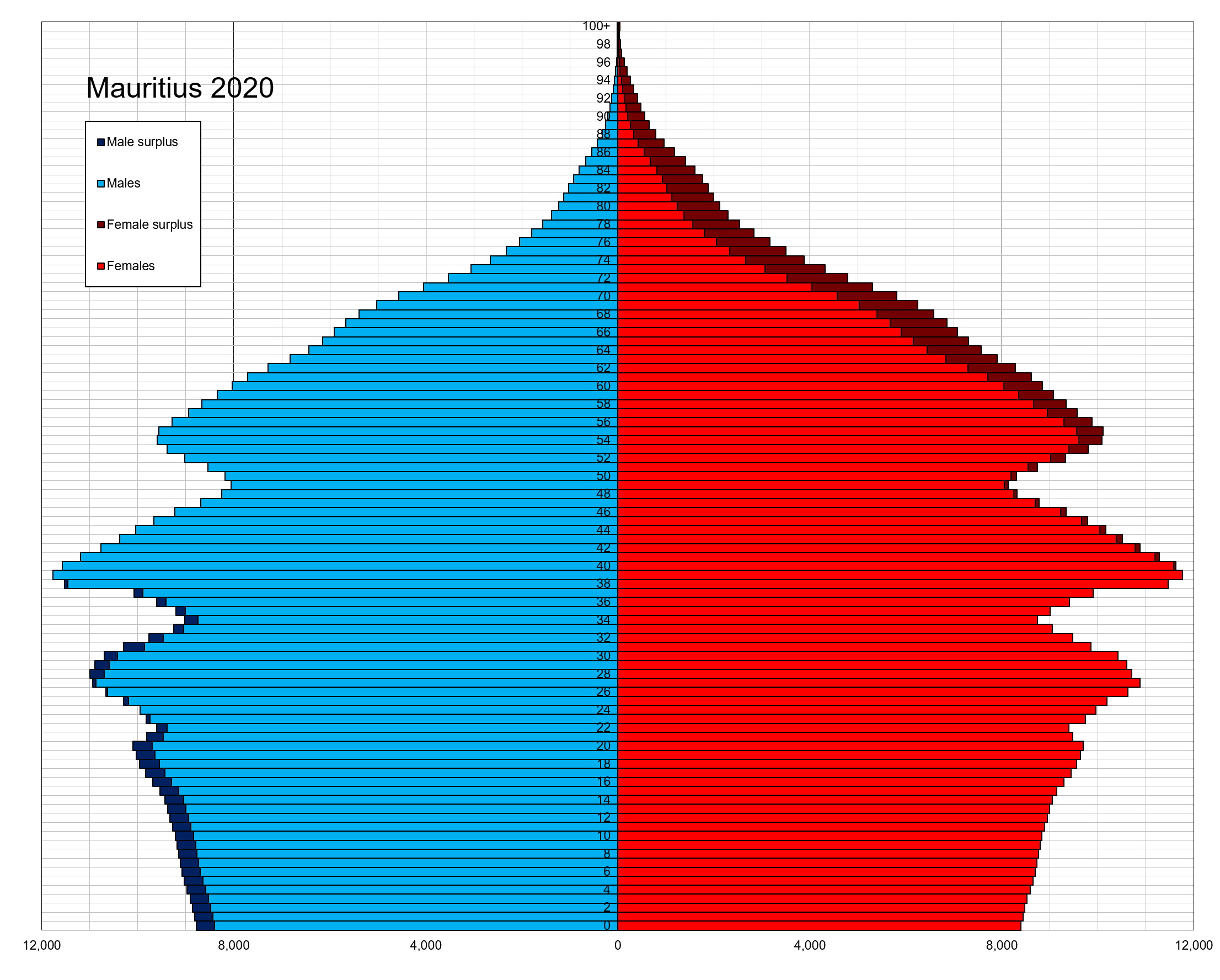
Population pyramid (2020)

In the 2022 census, Mauritius had a population of 1,235,260 (608,090 males, 627,170 females). The population on the island of Mauritius was 1,191,280 (586,590 males and 604,690 females), and that of Rodrigues island was 43,650 (21,330 males and 22,320 females). Agalega island's population was 330 (170 males and 160 females).

Mauritius has the second highest population density in Africa. In the 2022 census, the average age of the population was 38 years. The proportion of the populated aged below 15 years went down from 20.7% in 2011 to 15.4% in 2022, while the share of persons aged 60 years and over has risen from 12.7% to 18.7% in the same period.

Subsequent to a Constitutional amendment in 1982, the census does not compile data on ethnic identities anymore but records religious affiliation. The 1972 census was the last one to measure ethnicity. Mauritius is a multiethnic society, drawn from Indian, African, Chinese and European (mostly French) origin. Mauritian Creoles carry the Bantu haplotype and their mitochondrial genetics show significant ancestry with enslaved populations from East Africa and Madagascar while Indo-Mauritians carry genes associated with the Chota Nagpur Plateau in Ranchi District, Jharkhand.

In 2022, the number of Bangladeshi nationals and Indian nationals had respectively risen to 1.21% and 1.19% of the total resident population. Bengali is spoken at home by 1.18% of the population. Non-Mauritians make up 3.39% of the total resident population.

According to the Constitution of Mauritius, there are four distinct communities on the island for the purposes of representation in the National Assembly. Schedule I, Paragraph 3(4) of the Constitution states that The population of Mauritius shall be regarded as including a Hindu community, a Muslim community, and a Sino-Mauritian community, and every person who does not appear, from his way of life, to belong to one or other of those three communities shall be regarded as belonging to the General Population, which shall itself be regarded as a fourth community. Thus each ethnic group in Mauritius falls within one of the four main communities known as Hindus, General Population, Muslims and Sino-Mauritians.

As per the above constitutional provision, the 1972 ethnic statistics are used to implement the Best Loser System, the method used in Mauritius since the 1950s to guarantee ethnic representation across the entire electorate in the National Assembly without organising the representation wholly by ethnicity.

=== Religion ===
Religion in Mauritius, 2022.
1. Hinduism (47.9%)
2. Christianity (32.3%)
3. Islam (18.2%)
4. No religion (0.63%)
5. Other/Not stated (0.97%)

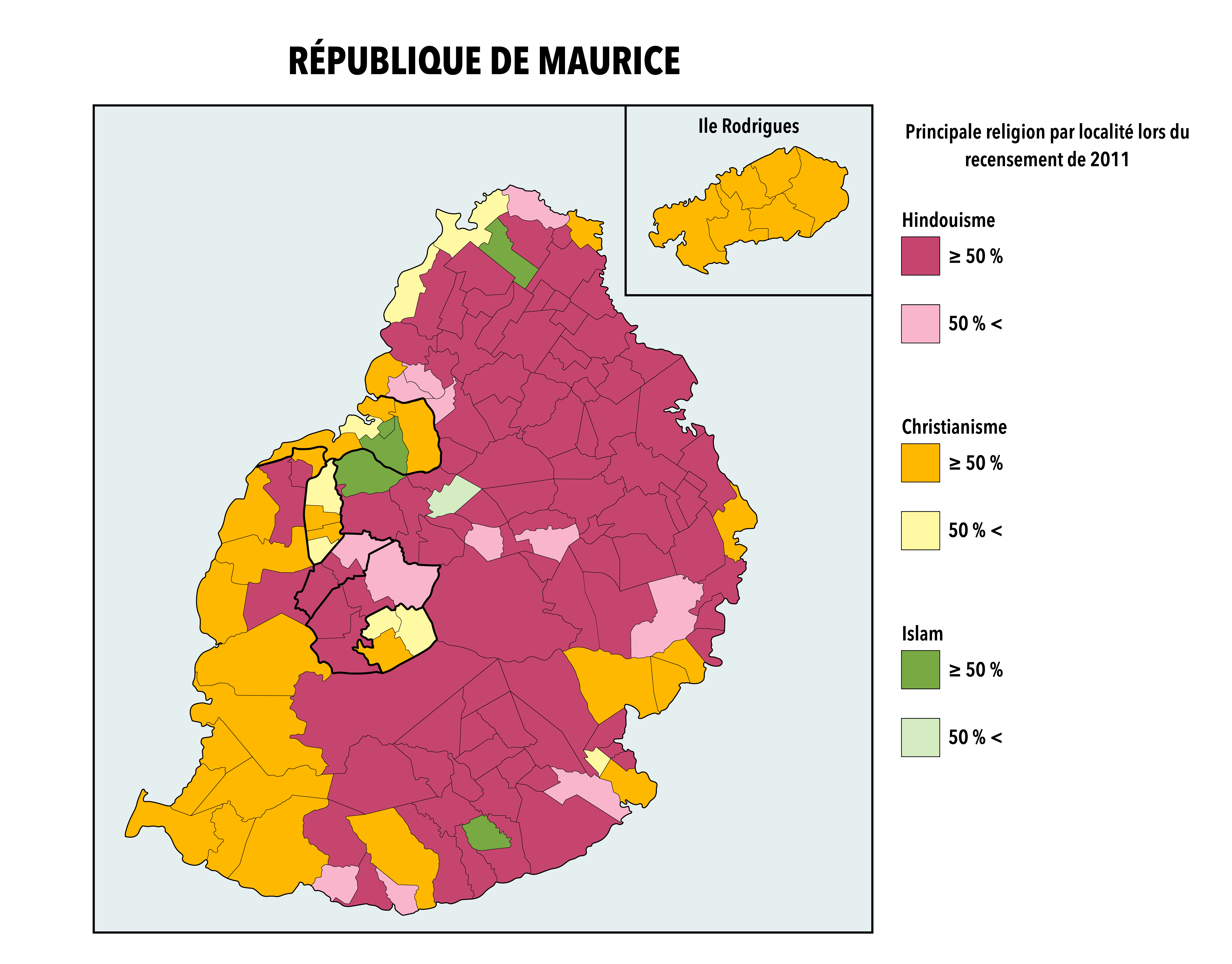
A map of Mauritius's religious distribution, 2011

According to the 2022 census conducted by Statistics Mauritius, 47.87% of the Mauritian population follows Hinduism, followed by Christianity (32.29%), out of which 24.94% are Catholic, Islam (18.24%) and other religions (0.86%) (including Chinese ethnic religions). 0.63% reported themselves as non-religious and 0.11% did not answer.

The constitution prohibits discrimination on religious grounds and provides for freedom to practice, change one's religion or not have any. The Catholic Church, Church of England, Presbyterian Church of Mauritius, Seventh-day Adventists, Hindu Temples Associations and Muslim Mosques Organisations have tax-exemptions and are allocated financial support based on their respective share of the population. Other religious groups can register and be tax-exempt but receive no financial support.

Public holidays of religious origins are the Hindu festivals of Maha Shivaratri, Ougadi, Thaipoosam Cavadee, Ganesh Chaturthi, and Diwali; the Christian festivals of All Saints Day and Christmas; and the Muslim festival of Eid al-Fitr. The state actively participates in their organisation with special committees presiding over the pilgrimage to Ganga Talao for Maha Shivaratri and the annual Catholic procession to Jacques-Désiré Laval's resting place at Sainte-Croix.

=== Languages ===
The Mauritian constitution makes no mention of an official language. It only mentions that the official language of the National Assembly is English; however, any member can also address the chair in French. English and French are generally considered to be de facto national and common languages of Mauritius, as they are the languages of government administration, courts, and business. The constitution of Mauritius is written in English, while some laws, such as the Civil and Criminal codes, are in French. The Mauritian currency features the Latin, Tamil and Devanagari scripts.

The Mauritian population is multilingual. Mauritian Creole is the mother tongue of most Mauritians. Most people are also fluent in English and French, and tend to switch languages according to the situation. French and English are favoured in educational and professional settings, while Asian languages are used mainly in music, religious and cultural activities. The media and literature are primarily in French.

The Mauritian Creole language, which is French-based with some additional influences, is spoken by the majority of the population as a native language, and attempts have been made to standardise it. The Creole languages spoken in different islands of the country are more or less similar: Mauritian, Rodriguan, Agalega and Chagossian Creoles are spoken by people from the islands of Mauritius, Rodrigues, Agaléga and Chagos, respectively. The following ancestral languages, also spoken in Mauritius, have received official recognition by acts of parliament: Bhojpuri, Chinese, Hindi, Marathi, Sanskrit, Tamil, Telugu and Urdu. Bhojpuri, once widely spoken as a mother tongue, has become less commonly spoken over the years. According to the 2022 census, Bhojpuri was spoken by 5.1% of the population compared to 12.1% in 2000.

School students must learn English and French. They may also opt for an Asian language or Mauritian Creole. The medium of instruction varies from school to school but is usually English for public and government subsidised private schools and mainly French for paid private ones. O-Level and A-Level exams are organised in public and government subsidised private schools in English by Cambridge International Examinations while paid private schools mostly follow the French Baccalaureate model.

== Education ==
The education system in Mauritius consists of pre-primary, primary, secondary and tertiary sectors. The education structure consists of two to three years of pre-primary school, six years of primary schooling leading to the Primary School Achievement Certificate, five years of secondary education leading to the School Certificate, and two years of higher secondary ending with the Higher School Certificate.

Secondary schools have "college" as part of their title. The O-Level and A-Level examinations are carried out by the University of Cambridge through University of Cambridge International Examinations in collaboration with the MES.

The tertiary education sector includes universities and other technical institutions in Mauritius. The two main public universities are the University of Mauritius and the University of Technology, in addition to the Université des Mascareignes, founded in 2012, and the Open University of Mauritius. These four public universities and several other technical institutes and higher education colleges are tuition-free for students as of 2019.

The government of Mauritius provides free education to its citizens from pre-primary to tertiary level. In 2013 government expenditure on education was estimated at ₨ 13,584 million, representing 13% of total expenditure. As of January 2017, the government has introduced changes to the education system with the Nine-Year Continuous Basic Education programme, which abolished the Certificate of Primary Education (CPE).

The adult literacy rate was at 91.9% in 2022 with 8.8% of the total population holding a tertiary level qualification. Mauritius was ranked 53rd in the Global Innovation Index in 2025, 1st in Africa.

== Economy ==
Mauritius is often described as the most developed country in Africa. Since independence from Britain in 1968, Mauritius has developed from a low-income, agriculture-based economy to a high-income diversified economy, based on tourism, textiles, sugar, and financial services. The economic history of Mauritius since independence has been called "the Mauritian Miracle" and the "success of Africa".

In recent years, information and communication technology, seafood, hospitality and property development, healthcare, renewable energy, and education and training have emerged as important sectors, attracting substantial investment from both local and foreign investors. Mauritius has one of the largest exclusive economic zones in the world, and in 2012 the government announced its intention to develop the marine economy.

Mauritius has no exploitable fossil fuel reserves and so relies on petroleum products to meet most of its energy requirements. Local and renewable energy sources are biomass, hydro, solar and wind energy. In 2024, Mauritius contributed approximately 0.01% of global greenhouse gas emissions. The country has pledged to cut emissions by 40% by 2030 compared to projected levels without intervention, with a goal of reaching net zero by 2070. As part of its climate change strategy, Mauritius plans to eliminate coal from electricity generation by 2030, reduce landfill waste by diverting 70% of it through a circular economy approach, and increase the share of electric vehicles to 15% by the same year.

In 2012, Mauritius was ranked high in terms of economic competitiveness, a friendly investment climate, good governance and a free economy. The Gross Domestic Product (PPP) was estimated at US$29.187 billion in 2018, and GDP (PPP) per capita was over US$22,909, the second highest in Africa.

Mauritius has a high-income economy, according to the World Bank in 2019. The World Bank's 2019 Ease of Doing Business Index ranks Mauritius 13th worldwide out of 190 economies in terms of ease of doing business. According to the Mauritian Ministry of Foreign Affairs, the country's challenges are heavy reliance on a few industry sectors, high brain drain, scarcity of skilled labour, ageing population and inefficient public companies and para-statal bodies.

According to the 2019 Economic Freedom of the World report, Mauritius is ranked as having the 9th most free economy in the world.

Mauritius has historically relied on external financial inflows like tourism revenue, offshore finance and foreign aid.

=== Financial services ===
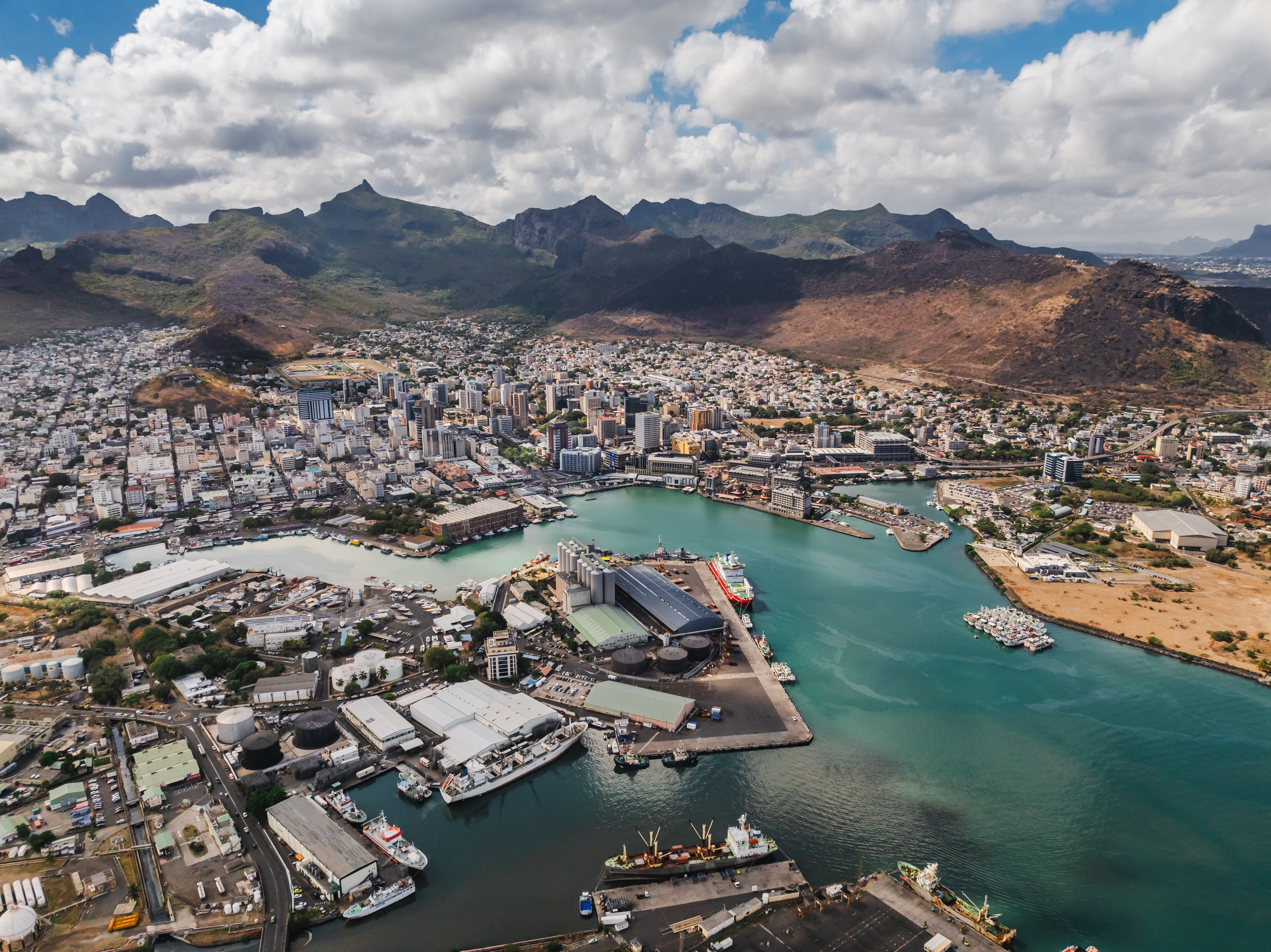
Port-Louis, the capital of Mauritius

In 2018, financial and insurance activities contributed to 11.1% of the Mauritius's GDP. Over the years, Mauritius has been positioning itself as the preferred hub for investment into Africa due its strategic location between Asia and Africa, hybrid regulatory framework, ease of doing business, investment protection treaties, non-double taxation treaties, highly qualified and multilingual workforce, political stability, low crime rate coupled with modern infrastructure and connectivity. It is home to a number of international banks, legal firms, corporate services, investment funds and private equity funds. Financial products and services include private banking, global business, insurance and reinsurance, limited companies, protected cell companies, trust and foundation, investment banking, global headquarter administration.

Corporate tax rate ranges from 15% to 17% and individual tax rate ranges from 10% to 25%. While Mauritius also offers incentives such as tax holidays and exemptions in some specific sectors to boost its competitiveness, Mauritius is often tagged as a tax haven by the press due to individuals and companies who engaged in abusive practices in its financial sector. Mauritius has built up a solid reputation by making use of best practices and adopting a strong legal and regulatory framework to demonstrate its compliance with international demands for greater transparency.

In June 2015, Mauritius adhered to the multilateral Convention on Mutual Administrative Assistance in Tax Matters, and has an exchange information mechanism with 127 jurisdictions. Mauritius is a founding member of the Eastern and Southern Africa Anti Money Laundering Group and has been at the forefront in the fight against money laundering and other forms of financial crime. Mauritius has adopted exchange of information on an automatic basis under the Common Reporting Standard and the Foreign Accounts Tax Compliance Act.

=== Tourism ===
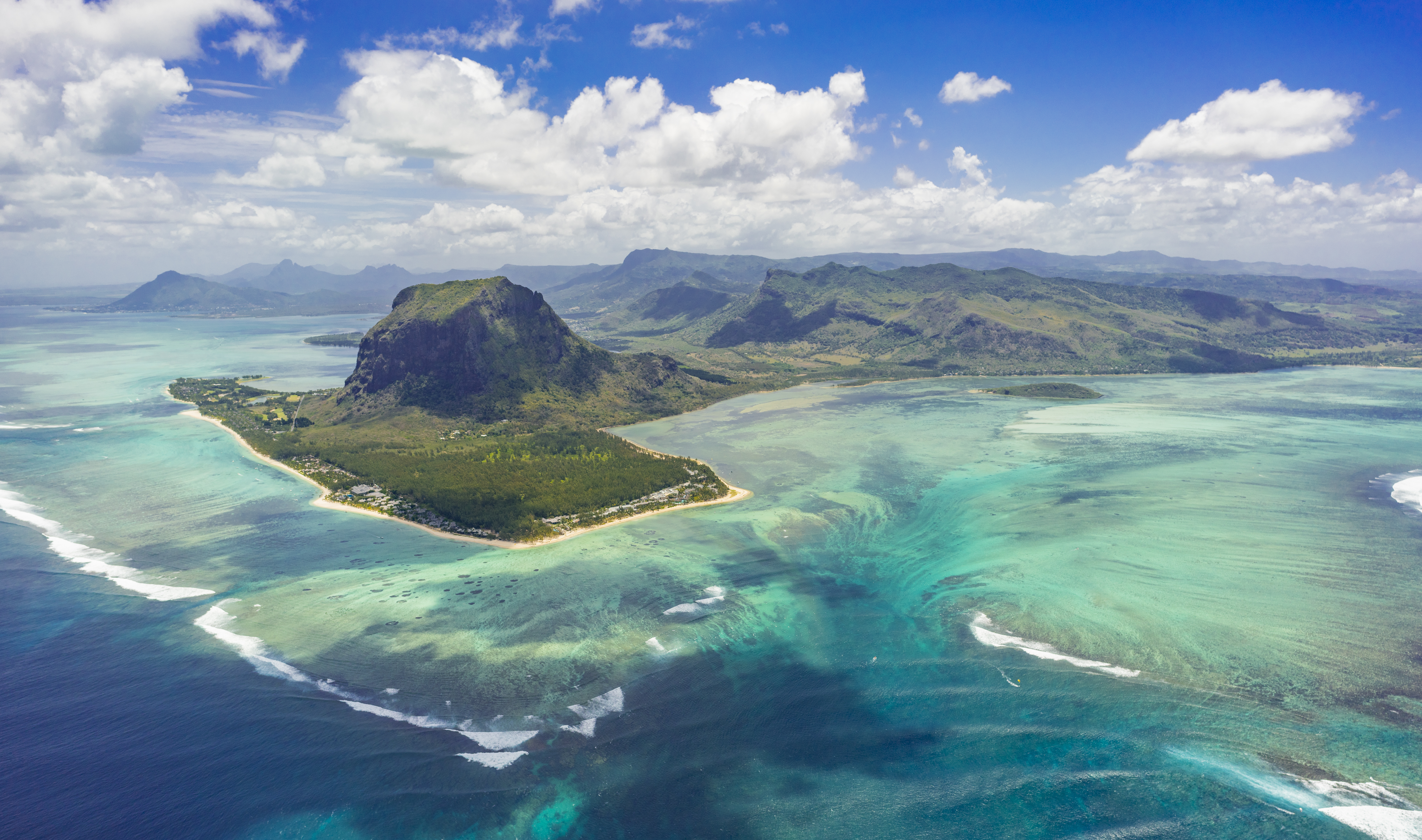
Le Morne peninsula

Mauritius is a major tourist destination, and the tourism sector is one of the main pillars of the Mauritian economy. Mauritius enjoys a tropical climate with clear warm sea waters, beaches, tropical fauna and flora, complemented by a multi-ethnic and cultural population. In 2025, the number of tourist arrivals recorded was 1.44 million, an increase from the 1.38 million in 2024.

Mauritius has two UNESCO World Heritage Sites, namely, Aapravasi Ghat and Le Morne Cultural Landscape. Black River Gorges National Park is currently in the UNESCO tentative list.

=== Transport ===
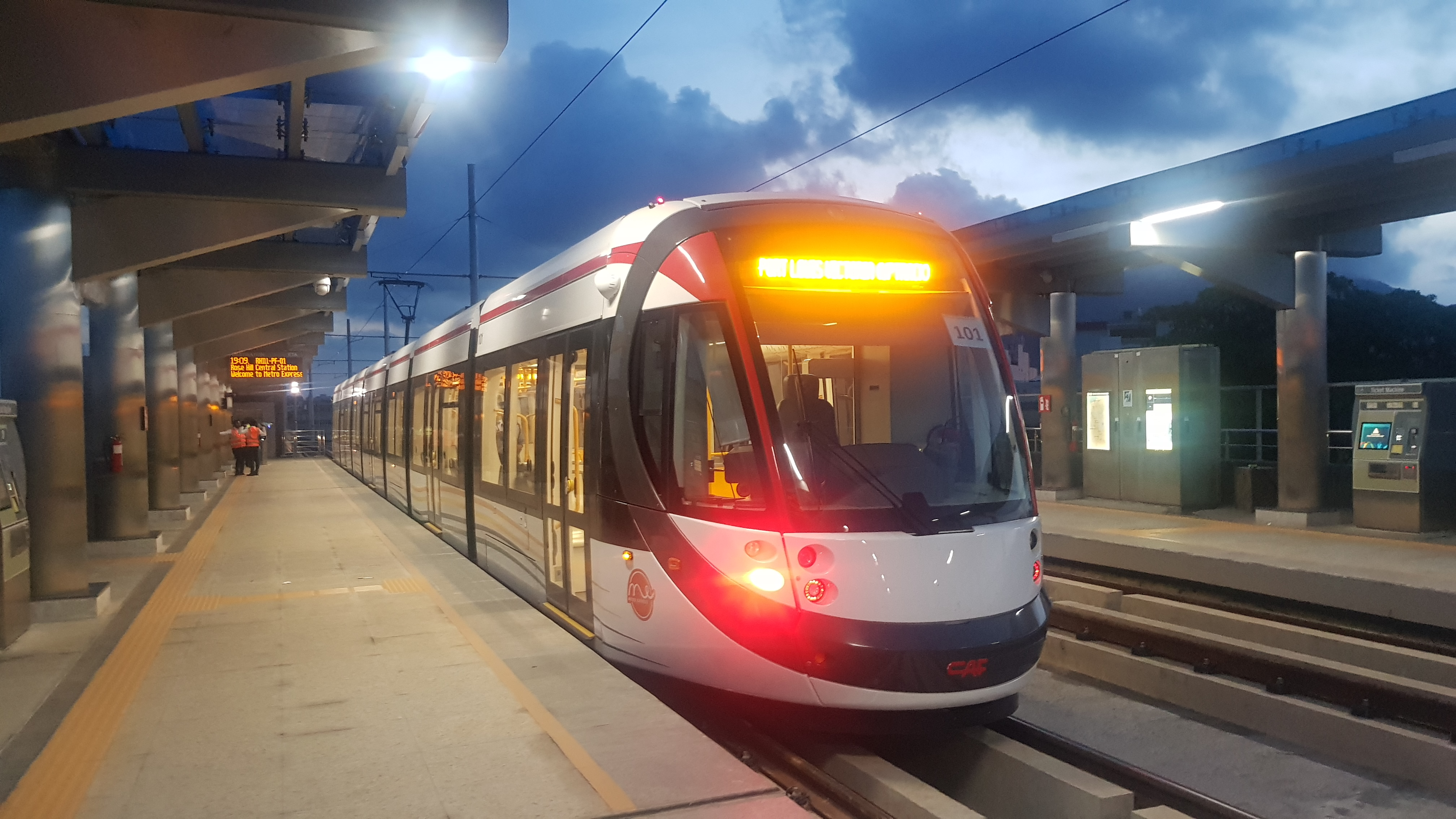
An Urbos 100–3 at Rose Hill Central Station

Public transit in Mauritius has been free of charge for students, people with disabilities, and senior citizens since 2005 for buses, and later for trains. The Metro Express railway links all five cities and the University of Mauritius at Réduit, with planned expansion to the east and south. Former privately owned industrial railways have been abandoned since the 1960s.

The harbour of Port Louis handles international trade and a cruise terminal. The Sir Seewoosagur Ramgoolam International Airport, the largest one in the Indian Ocean, is the main international airport and serves as the home operating base for the national airline Air Mauritius. The Plaine Corail Airport operates from Rodrigues ensuring air link with the main island of Mauritius and international flights with Réunion.

=== Information and communications technology (ICT) ===
The information and communications technology (ICT) sector has contributed to 5.7% of its GDP in 2016.

Additionally, the African Network Information Centre (AFRINIC) – the regional Internet registry for Africa – is based in Ebene.

Mauritius is also connected to global Internet infrastructure via multiple optical fibre submarine communications cables, including the Lower Indian Ocean Network (LION) cable, the Mauritius–Rodrigues Submarine Cable, and the South Africa Far East (SAFE) cable.

=== Biomedical exports ===
Since the COVID-19 Pandemic, Mauritius has become the world's leading exporter of macaques for biomedical testing. During the pandemic, China, formerly the world's top macaque exporter, restricted its exports in order to bolster its domestic supply. Western nations have increasingly looked to Mauritius to supply their laboratories. Farmers and trappers on the islands sell the monkeys to exporters and breeders. Proponents of the industry say that it regulates the invasive macaque population, to the benefit of agriculture and the islands' biodiversity. Some Hindu Mauritians have raised ethical and religious objections to industry practices.

== Culture ==
=== Art ===
Prominent Mauritian painters include Henri Le Sidaner, Malcolm de Chazal, Raouf Oderuth and Vaco Baissac while Gabrielle Wiehe is a prominent illustrator and graphic designer.

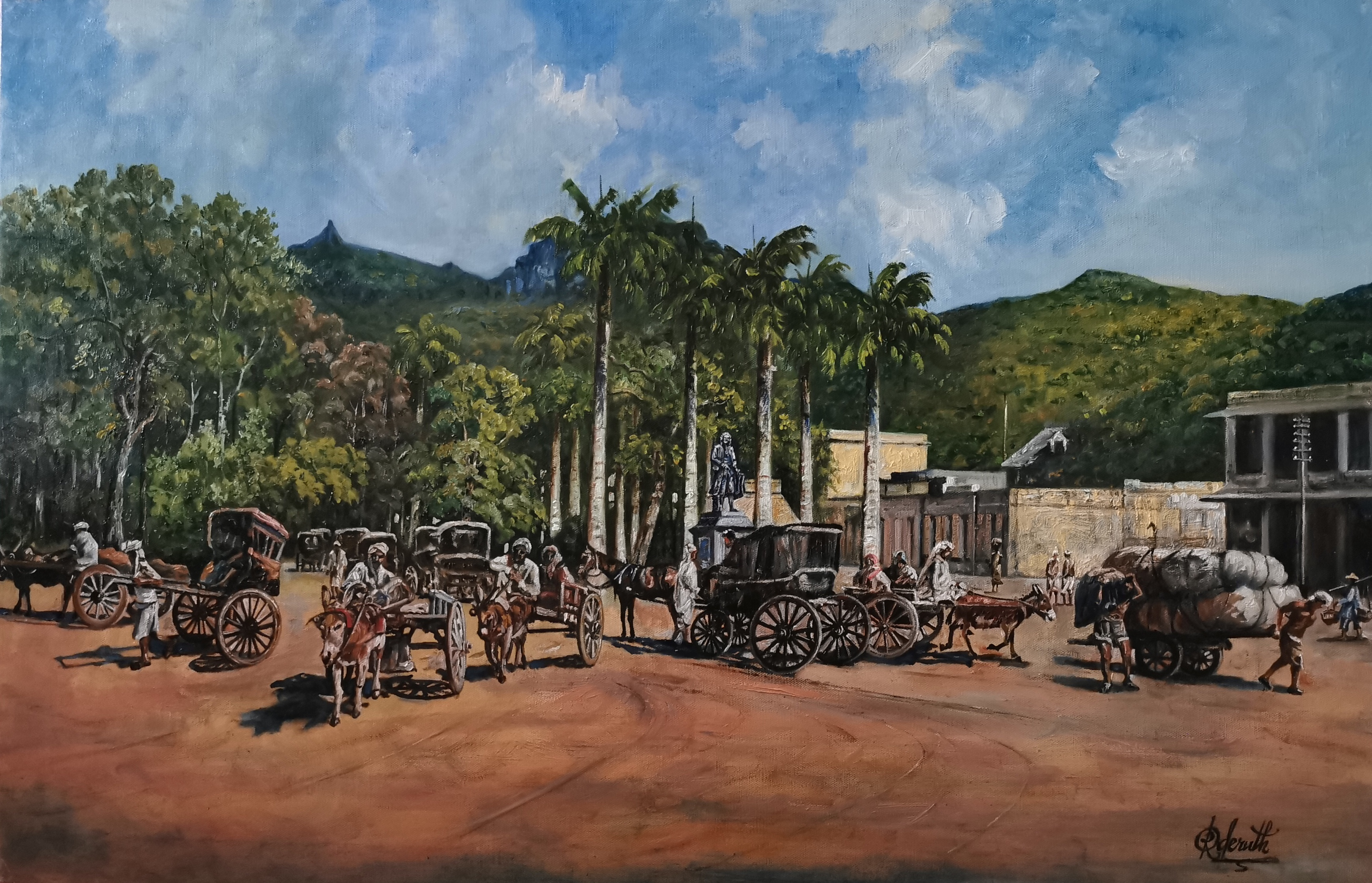
Mauritius in the 1930s.

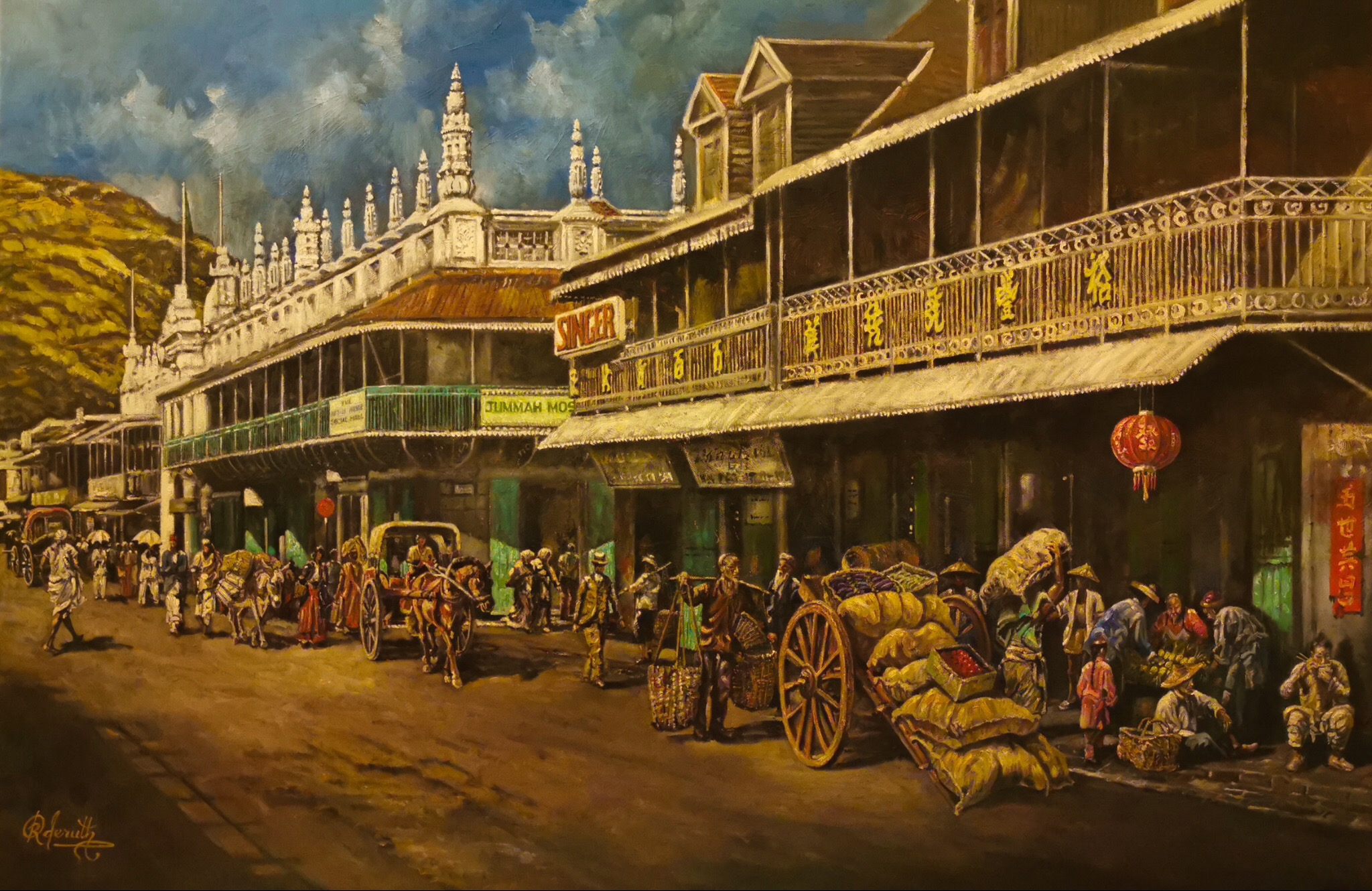
Chinatown in the 1860s

Ebene City

The Mauritius "Post Office" stamps, the first stamps produced outside Great Britain, among the rarest postage stamps in the world, are widely considered "the greatest item in all philately".

=== Architecture ===
The distinctive architecture of Mauritius reflects the island nation's history as a colonial trade base connecting Europe with the East. Styles and forms introduced by Dutch, French, and British settlers from the seventeenth century onward, mixed with influences from India and East Africa, resulted in a unique hybrid architecture of international historic, social, and artistic significance. Mauritian structures present a variety of designs, materials, and decorative elements that are unique to the country and inform the historical context of the Indian Ocean and European colonialism.

Decades of political, social, and economic change have resulted in the routine destruction of Mauritian architectural heritage. Between 1960 and 1980, the historic homes of the island's high grounds, known locally as campagnes, disappeared at alarming rates. More recent years have witnessed the demolition of plantations, residences, and civic buildings as they have been cleared or drastically renovated for new developments to serve an expanding tourism industry. The capital city of Port Louis remained relatively unchanged until the mid-1990s, yet now reflects the irreversible damage that has been inflicted on its built heritage. Rising land values are pitted against the cultural value of historical structures in Mauritius, while the prohibitive costs of maintenance and the steady decline in traditional building skills make it harder to invest in preservation.

The general populace historically lived in what are termed creole houses.

=== Literature ===
Mauritius is remembered in literature mostly for the novel Paul et Virginie, a classic of French literature, by Bernardin de Saint-Pierre and for Alice's Adventures in Wonderland's Dodo

Jean-Marie Le Clézio, Ananda Devi, Nathacha Appanah, Malcolm de Chazal, Eugénie Poujade, Marie-Thérèse Humbert, Shenaz Patel, Khal Torabully, Aqiil Gopee, South-African born Lindsey Collen-Seegobin writing in English and French, Dev Virahsawmy writing mostly in Mauritian Creole and Abhimanyu Unnuth writing in Hindi are some of the most prominent Mauritian writers. Le Clézio, who won the Nobel Prize for Literature in 2008, is of Mauritian heritage and holds dual French-Mauritian citizenship. The island plays host to the Le Prince Maurice Prize. In keeping with the island's literary culture the prize alternates on a yearly basis between English-speaking and French-speaking writers.

=== Music ===
The major musical genres of Mauritius are sega and its fusion genre, seggae, Bhojpuri folk songs and Indian film music especially Bollywood. Western classical music and Indian classical music are taught, respectively, at the François Mitterrand Conservatory and the Mahatma Gandhi Institute.

=== Cuisine ===
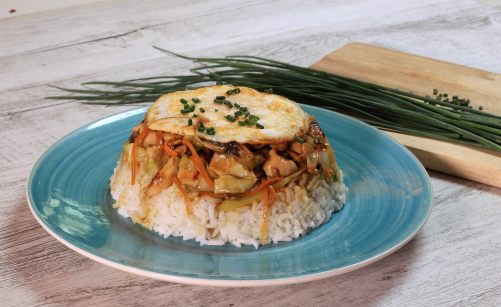
Bol renversé

Mauritian cuisine is a combination of Indian, Creole, French and Chinese cuisines, with many dishes unique to the island. Local variants of Asian and European cuisines include vegetarian and non vegetarian curries, parathas locally known as farata or roti, the potato rich briani, wok prepared mines frires and diriz frires, a chop suey dish known as bol renversé (upside-down bowl), sausage and tomato based rougaille and Mughlai-origin alouda, a cold beverage, amongst others. Locally made French pastry and bread are sold in most localities with locally unique desserts like napolitaine, a local version of sablé coated with a pink icing, coconut based gâteau coco and macacha coco and iced kulfi.

Masala spices, dals, zassar from Indian-origin achar and leaf vegetables known as brèdes are commonly consumed in all households. Street food sold by hawkers include popular wraps dholl puri and roti, local versions of Indian pakoras like gâteau piment and chana puris.

=== Holidays and festivals ===
The public holidays of Mauritius involve the blending of several cultures from Mauritius's history. There are Hindu festivals, Christian festivals, Chinese festivals, and Muslim festivals. There are 14 annual public holidays in Mauritius with New Year celebrated over two days if it falls on a weekend. All the public holidays related to religious festivals have dates that vary from year to year except for Christmas. Other festivals such as Holi, Raksha Bandhan, Durga Puja, Makar Sankranti and Père Laval Pilgrimage also enrich the cultural landscape of Mauritius.

Public holidays in Mauritius in 2026	Date
New Year	Thursday 1 January – Friday 2 January
Abolition of Slavery	Sunday 1 February
Thaipoosam Cavadee	Saturday 1 February
Maha Shivaratri	Sunday 15 February
Chinese Spring Festival	Tuesday 17 February
Independence and Republic Day	Thursday 12 March
Ougadi	Thursday 19 March
Eid-Ul-Fitr (Depending on the visibility of the moon)	Saturday 21 March
Labour Day	Friday 1 May
All Saints Day	Saturday 15 August
Ganesh Chaturthi	Wednesday 16 September
Arrival of Indian Indentured Labourers	Monday 2 November
Divali	Sunday 8 November
Christmas	Friday 25 December

=== Sports ===
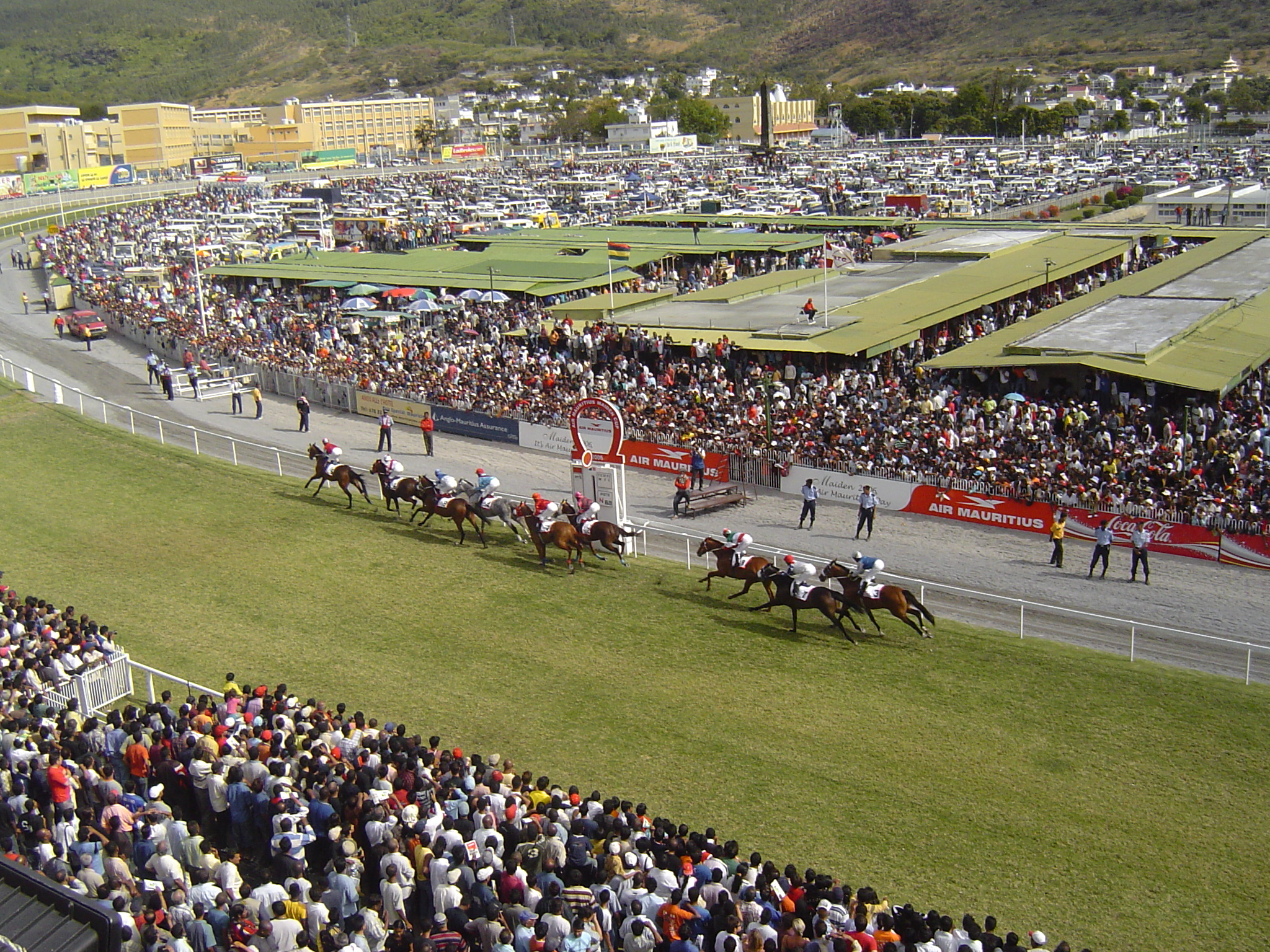
The Maiden Cup in 2006

The most popular sport in Mauritius is football and the national team is known as The Dodos or Club M. Other popular sports in Mauritius include cycling, table tennis, horse racing, badminton, volleyball, basketball, handball, boxing, judo, karate, taekwondo, weightlifting, bodybuilding and athletics. Water sports include swimming, sailing, scuba diving, windsurfing and kitesurfing.

Kim le Court is a successful professional cyclist. With multiple podium places in the African Road Championships, she is the 2024 national road race and time trial champion. She won stage 8 of the 2024 Giro d'Italia Women. In 2025, she won Liege-Bastogne-Liege Femmes, came 3rd overall in the UAE Tour Women and 5th in the Tour of Flanders for Women.

Horseracing, which dates from 1812 when the Champ de Mars Racecourse was inaugurated, remains popular. The Mauritius Turf Club is the oldest horse-racing club in the Southern Hemisphere and the second oldest in the world. Mauritius hosted the second (1985), fifth (2003) and tenth editions (2019) of the Indian Ocean Island Games. Mauritius won its first Olympic medal at the 2008 Summer Olympics in Beijing when boxer Bruno Julie won the bronze medal.

In golf, the former Mauritius Open and the current AfrAsia Bank Mauritius Open have been part of the European Tour.

== See also ==
- Outline of Mauritius

== Bibliography ==
- Macdonald, Fiona; et al. "Mauritius". Peoples of Africa. pp. 340–341.
- This article incorporates public domain text from the websites of the Government of Mauritius Archived 22 October 2018 at the Wayback Machine, the United States Department of State, the U.S. Library of Congress, and the CIA World Factbook.
