= List of districts of Mauritius by Human Development Index =

This is a list of Districts of Mauritius by Human Development Index as of 2022.

Rank	District	HDI (2022)
Very high human development
1	Black River	0.806
2	Grand Port	0.806
3	Plaines Wilhems	0.806
4	Savanne	0.806
High human development
–	Mauritius	0.796
5	Flacq	0.791
6	Moka	0.791
7	Pamplemousses	0.791
8	Port Louis	0.791
9	Rivière du Rempart	0.791
10	Rodrigues	0.715

== See also ==
- List of countries by Human Development Index
