= List of places in Mauritius =

This is a list of populated places in Mauritius and Agaléga.

== Mauritius ==
=== Cities ===
| Name | District | Population (Census 2015) |
|---|---|---|
| Port Louis | Port Louis | 149,195 |

=== Towns ===
| Name | District | Population (Census 2015) |
|---|---|---|
| Vacoas-Phoenix | Plaines Wilhems | 115,289 |
| Beau Bassin-Rose Hill | Plaines Wilhems | 104,610 |
| Curepipe | Plaines Wilhems | 79,014 |
| Quatre Bornes | Plaines Wilhems | 77,505 |

=== Villages ===
| Name | District(s) | Population (Census 2015) |
|---|---|---|
| Albion | Rivière Noire | 5,215 |
| Amaury | Rivière du Rempart; Flacq | 2,960 |
| Amitié-Gokhoola | Rivière du Rempart | 2,256 |
| Anse La Raie | Rivière du Rempart | |
| Arsenal | Pamplemousses | 2,937 |
| Baie du Cap | Savanne | 2,388 |
| Baie du Tombeau | Pamplemousses | 14,687 |
| Bambous | Rivière Noire | 15,345 |
| Bambous Virieux | Grand Port | 1,496 |
| Bananes | Grand Port | 660 |
| Beau Vallon | Grand Port | 6,904 |
| Bel Air Rivière Sèche | Flacq | 17,605 |
| Bel Ombre | Savanne | 2,417 |
| Belle Vue Haurel | Pamplemousses | 4,518 |
| Bénarès | Savanne | 2,209 |
| Bois Chéri | Savanne | 3,482 |
| Bois des Amourettes | Grand Port | 1,880 |
| Bon Accueil | Flacq | 6,203 |
| Bramsthan | Flacq | |
| Brisée Verdière | Flacq; Rivière du Rempart | 7,512 |
| Britannia | Savanne | 1,278 |
| Calebasses | Pamplemousses | 4,816 |
| Camp Carol | Grand Port | |
| Camp de Masque | Flacq | 2,720 |
| Camp de Masque Pavé | Flacq | 4,260 |
| Camp Diable | Savanne | 4,796 |
| Camp Ithier | Flacq | 4,269 |
| Camp Thorel | Moka | 2,128 |
| Cap Malheureux | Rivière du Rempart | 5,070 |
| Cascavelle | Rivière Noire; Plaines Wilhems | 2,479 |
| Case Noyale | Rivière Noire | 1,703 |
| Centre de Flacq | Flacq | 15,791 |
| Chamarel | Rivière Noire; Savanne | 783 |
| Chamouny | Savanne | 4,721 |
| Chemin Grenier | Savanne | 12,223 |
| Clémencia | Flacq | 1,825 |
| Cluny | Grand Port | 1,549 |
| Congomah | Pamplemousses | 1,895 |
| Cottage | Rivière du Rempart | 4,192 |
| Crève Coeur | Pamplemousses | 2,790 |
| D'Épinay | Pamplemousses | 5,304 |
| Dagotière | Moka | 7,146 |
| Dubreuil | Moka; Flacq | 2,840 |
| Écroignard | Flacq | 6,189 |
| Espérance | Moka | 1,884 |
| Espérance Trébuchet | Rivière du Rempart | 2,148 |
| Flic en Flac | Rivière Noire | 2,197 |
| Fond du Sac | Pamplemousses | 5,186 |
| Goodlands | Rivière du Rempart | 20,712 |
| Grand Baie | Rivière du Rempart; Pamplemousses | 11,910 |
| Grand Bel Air | Grand Port | 1,538 |
| Grand Bois | Savanne | 7,982 |
| Grand Gaube | Rivière du Rempart | 7,578 |
| Grand Sable | Grand Port | 2,182 |
| Grande Retraite | Flacq | |
| Grande Rivière Noire | Rivière Noire | 2,668 |
| Grande Rivière Sud Est | Flacq | 2,107 |
| Gros Cailloux | Rivière Noire | 3,189 |
| L'Avenir | Moka | 2,702 |
| L'Escalier | Grand Port; Savanne | 7,770 |
| La Flora | Grand Port; Savanne | |
| La Gaulette | Rivière Noire | 2,315 |
| La Laura-Malenga | Moka | 1,288 |
| Lalmatie | Flacq | 10,387 |
| Laventure | Flacq | 5,995 |
| Le Hochet | Pamplemousses | 15,034 |
| Le Morne | Rivière Noire | 1,300 |
| Le Vale | Rivière du Rempart | 3,840 |
| Mahébourg | Grand Port | 18,176 |
| Mapou | Rivière du Rempart; Pamplemousses | 1,529 |
| Mare Chicose | Grand Port | 325 |
| Mare d'Albert | Grand Port | 4,666 |
| Mare La Chaux | Flacq | 1,925 |
| Mare Tabac | Grand Port | 2,731 |
| Médine Camp de Masque | Flacq; Moka | 7,116 |
| Melrose | Moka | 1,955 |
| Midlands | Plaines Wilhems | 5,303 |
| Moka | Moka; Plaines Wilhems | 8,846 |
| Montagne Blanche | Moka; Flacq | 9,053 |
| Montagne Longue | Pamplemousses | 6,995 |
| Morcellement Saint André | Pamplemousses | 5,750 |
| New Grove | Grand Port | 10,518 |
| Notre Dame | Pamplemousses | 4,216 |
| Nouvelle Découverte | Moka | 3,024 |
| Nouvelle France | Grand Port | 7,165 |
| Olivia | Flacq | 3,667 |
| Pailles | Port Louis | 11,618 |
| Pamplemousses | Pamplemousses | 9,295 |
| Petit Bel Air | Grand Port | 1,186 |
| Petit Raffray | Rivière du Rempart | 9,254 |
| Petite Rivière | Rivière Noire | 4,591 |
| Piton | Rivière du Rempart; Pamplemousses | 4,942 |
| Plaine des Papayes | Pamplemousses | 7,607 |
| Plaine des Roches | Rivière du Rempart; Flacq | 4,020 |
| Plaine Magnien | Grand Port | 10,443 |
| Pointe aux Piments | Pamplemousses | 9,079 |
| Poste de Flacq | Flacq | 8,454 |
| Poudre d'Or | Rivière du Rempart | 4,142 |
| Poudre d'Or Hamlet | Rivière du Rempart | 2,335 |
| Providence | Moka | 3,285 |
| Quartier Militaire | Moka | 7,046 |
| Quatre Cocos | Flacq | 5,872 |
| Quatre Soeurs | Flacq | 3,317 |
| Queen Victoria | Flacq | 2,898 |
| Richelieu | Rivière Noire | 7,906 |
| Ripailles | Pamplemousses; Moka | |
| Rivière des Anguilles | Savanne | 9,242 |
| Rivière des Créoles | Grand Port | 3,066 |
| Rivière du Poste | Grand Port; Savanne | 2,170 |
| Rivière du Rempart | Rivière du Rempart | 10,825 |
| Roche Terre | Rivière du Rempart | 3,162 |
| Roches Noires | Rivière du Rempart | 5,683 |
| Rose Belle | Grand Port | 12,035 |
| Saint Aubin | Savanne | 1,346 |
| Saint Hubert | Grand Port | 3,153 |
| Saint Julien Village | Flacq | 2,676 |
| Saint Julien d'Hotman | Flacq; Moka | 3,361 |
| Saint Pierre | Moka | 15,982 |
| Sébastopol | Flacq | 5,553 |
| Seizième Mille | Plaines Wilhems | |
| Souillac | Savanne | 4,411 |
| Surinam | Savanne | 10,507 |
| Tamarin | Rivière Noire | 3,766 |
| Terre Rouge | Pamplemousses | 10,760 |
| Triolet | Pamplemousses | 23,386 |
| Trois Boutiques | Grand Port | 7,322 |
| Trou aux Biches | Pamplemousses | |
| Trou d'Eau Douce | Flacq | 5,672 |
| Tyack | Savanne | |
| Union Park | Grand Port | 4,907 |
| Vale | Riviere du Rempart | 2,181 |
| Verdun | Moka | 2,181 |
| Vieux Grand Port | Grand Port | 2,969 |
| Ville Bague | Pamplemousses; Rivière du Rempart | 2,306 |

== Agaléga ==
| Name | Island | Population (Census 2011) |
|---|---|---|
| La Fourche | North | |
| Sainte Rita | South | |
| Vingt-Cinq | North | |
| Total: | | 289 |

== See also ==
- Outer islands of Mauritius
- Districts of Mauritius
- Geography of Mauritius
- ISO 3166-2:MU
