= ISO 3166-2:MU =

Entry for Mauritius in ISO 3166-2

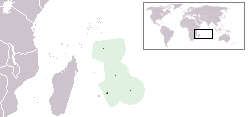
Map highlighting the location of Mauritius

ISO 3166-2:MU is the entry for Mauritius in ISO 3166-2, part of the ISO 3166 standard published by the International Organization for Standardization (ISO), which defines codes for the names of the principal subdivisions (e.g., provinces or states) of all countries coded in ISO 3166-1.

Currently for Mauritius, ISO 3166-2 codes are defined for three dependencies and 9 districts.

Each code consists of two parts separated by a hyphen. The first part is MU, the ISO 3166-1 alpha-2 code of Mauritius. The second part is two letters.

== Current codes ==
Subdivision names are listed as in the ISO 3166-2 standard published by the ISO 3166 Maintenance Agency (ISO 3166/MA).

Click on the button in the header to sort each column.

Code	Subdivision name (en)	Subdivision category
MU-AG	Agalega Islands	dependency
MU-BL	Black River	district
MU-CC	Cargados Carajos Shoals (local variant: Saint Brandon Islands)	dependency
MU-FL	Flacq	district
MU-GP	Grand Port	district
MU-MO	Moka	district
MU-PA	Pamplemousses	district
MU-PW	Plaines Wilhems	district
MU-PL	Port Louis	district
MU-RR	Rivière du Rempart	district
MU-RO	Rodrigues Island	dependency
MU-SA	Savanne	district

== Changes ==
The following changes to the entry have been announced in newsletters by the ISO 3166/MA since the first publication of ISO 3166-2 in 1998:

Newsletter	Date issued	Description of change in newsletter	Code/Subdivision change
Newsletter I-4	2002-12-10	Error correction: Duplicate use of one code element corrected. Subdivision categories in header re-sorted	Codes: (to correct duplicate use); Port Louis (city): MU-PL → MU-PU
Online Browsing Platform (OBP)	2020-11-24	Deletion of city MU-BR, MU-CU, MU-PU, MU-QB, MU-VP; Update List Source; Correction of the Code Source	Deleted: MU-BR (Beau Bassin-Rose Hill), MU-CU (Curepipe), MU-PU (Port Louis), MU-QB (Quatre Bornes), MU-VP (Vacoas-Phoenix)

== See also ==
- Subdivisions of Mauritius
- FIPS region codes of Mauritius
