= Miss Estrella Mauritius =

National beauty pageant competition in Mauritius

Miss Maurice Organization Estrella Mauritius
- Formation: 2016; 10 years ago
- Type: Beauty pageant
- Headquarters: Port Louis
- Location: Mauritius
- Members: Miss Universe; Miss International; Miss and Mister Supranational
- Official language: English
- President: Vandana Jeetah
- Website: missestrella.com

Miss Maurice is a national Beauty pageant in Mauritius under Éstrella Mauritius Organization. The pageant was founded in 2016, where the winners were sent to Miss Universe.

== History ==
The Miss Maurice was happened for the first time in 2016 by Estrella Mauritius organization. The pageant is a new face in Mauritius after Miss Mauritius pageant existed for long in the country. The Estrella Mauritius aims to be a platform for young women and to promote the Mauritian flair and beauty.

=== Franchise holders ===
The Estrella Mauritius is an official franchise holder for Miss Universe, Miss International, Miss and Mister Supranational, Miss Asia Pacific International, and Miss Landscape International.

=== Directorships ===
- Primerose Obeegadoo (1974)
- Miss Maurice under Estrella Mauritius, Nevin Rupear (2016)
- Vandana Jeetah (2023)

== Formats ==
The Miss Maurice competition is traditionally holding area representation every year. The candidates will allow to represent their area at Miss Maurice competition. In the finale result there will be Second Runner-up, First Runner-up, then finally Miss Maurice winner.

DISTRICT

- Miss Flacq
- Miss Grand Port (sometimes the split into some village representatives)
- Miss Moka
- Miss Pamplemousses
- Miss Port Louis
- Miss Rivière du Rempart
- Miss Rivière Noire
- Miss Savanne

THE PLAINES WILHEMS DISTRICT

- Miss Beau Bassin-Rose Hill,
- Miss Curepipe
- Miss Quatre Bornes,
- Miss Vacoas-Phoenix

DEPENDENCY

- Miss Agaléga
- Miss Saint Brandon

REGION

- Miss Rodrigues

== Titleholders ==
Year	Miss Maurice	Represented, District	Mister Maurice	Represented, District
2016	Kushboo Ramnawaj	Port Louis, Port Louis	Debuted 2021	Debuted 2021
2017	Angie Callychurn	Curepipe, Plaines Wilhems	Debuted 2021	Debuted 2021
2018	Varsha Ragoobarsing	Flacq, Flacq	Debuted 2021	Debuted 2021
2019	Ornella LaFleche	Beau Bassin-Rose Hill, Plaines Wilhems	Debuted 2021	Debuted 2021
2020	Vandana Jeetah	Flacq, Flacq	Debuted 2021	Debuted 2021
2021	Anne Murielle Ravina	Rodrigues	Jean-Laurent David	Port Louis, Port Louis
2022	Alexandrine Belle-Etoile	Curepipe, Plaines Wilhems	x	x
2023	Nilmani Devi Hurlall	Mahébourg, Grand Port	x	x
2024	Tania René	Plaines Wilhems	x	x
2025	Aurélie Alcindor	Moka	x	x

=== Wins by district — Miss Maurice ===
Province	Titles	Years
Plaines Wilhems	4	2017, 2019, 2022, 2024
Flacq	3	2018, 2019, 2020
Moka	1	2025
Port Louis	1	2016
Rodrigues	1	2021
Grand Port	1	2023

=== Wins by district — Mister Maurice ===
Province	Titles	Years
Port Louis	1	2021

== Titleholders under Estrella Mauritius org. ==
=== Miss Universe Mauritius ===
- : Declared as Winner
- : Ended as runner-up or top 5/6 qualification
- : Ended as one of the finalists or semifinalists
- : Ended as special awards winner

Miss Estrella Mauritius has started to send a Miss Mauritius to Miss Universe from 2016. Between 1975 and 2015 Miss Mauritius franchised the Miss Universe to the main winner. On occasion, when the winner does not qualify (due to age) for either contest, a runner-up is sent.

Year	District	Miss Maurice	Placement at Miss Universe	Special awards	Notes
Vandana Jeetah directorship — a franchise holder to Miss Universe from 2023
Did not compete in 2026
2025	Moka	Aurélie Alcindor	Unplaced		
2024	Plaines Wilhems	Tania René	Unplaced		
2023	Grand Port District	Tatiana Beauharnais	Unplaced		In 2023 Nilmani Devi Hurlall was replaced by her runner-up to compete at Miss Universe competition. Tatiana was the second runner-up of Miss Maurice 2023.
Nevin Rupear directorship — a franchise holder to Miss Universe between 2016―2022
2022	Plaines Wilhems	Alexandrine Belle-Etoile	Unplaced		
2021	Rodrigues	Anne Murielle Ravina	Unplaced		
2020	Flacq	Vandana Jeetah	Unplaced		
2019	Plaines Wilhems	Ornella LaFleche	Unplaced		
2018	Flacq	Varsha Ragoobarsing	Unplaced		
2017	Plaines Wilhems	Angie Callychurn	Unplaced		
2016	Port Louis	Kushboo Ramnawaj	Unplaced		Kushboo was actually Miss Mauritius 2014 who dethroned in 2015 before competing at the Miss Universe 2015.
Primerose Obeegadoo directorship — a franchise holder to Miss Universe between 1975―2015
2015	Port Louis	Sheetal Khadun	Unplaced		Appointed — The winner of Miss Mauritius 2014, Kushboo Ramnawaj did not compete to Miss Universe 2015, due to personal issues.
2014	Plaines Wilhems	Pallavi Gungaram	Unplaced		
2013	Plaines Wilhems	Diya Beeltah	Unplaced		
2012	Plaines Wilhems	Ameeksha Devi Dilchand	Unplaced		
2011	Port Louis	Laetitia Darche	Unplaced		
2010	Port Louis	Dalysha Doorga	Unplaced		
2009	Port Louis	Deanna Valerie Anais Veerapatren	Unplaced		
2008	Plaines Wilhems	Olivia Carey	Unplaced		
2007	Port Louis	Sandra Faro	Unplaced		
2006	Port Louis	Isabelle Antoo	Unplaced		
2005	Port Louis	Marie-Natacha Magalie Antoo	Unplaced		
Did not compete in 2004
2003	Port Louis	Marie-Aimée Bergicourt	Unplaced		
2002	Port Louis	Karen Alexandre	Unplaced		
Did not compete in 2001
2000	Port Louis	Jenny Arthémidor	Unplaced		
1999	Port Louis	Micaella L'Hortalle	Unplaced		
1998	Port Louis	Leena Ramphul	Unplaced		
1997	Port Louis	Cindy Cesar	Unplaced		
Did not compete in 1996
1995	Port Louis	Marie Priscilla Mardaymootoo	Unplaced		
1994	Port Louis	Viveka Babajee	Unplaced		
1993	Port Louis	Danielle Pascal	Unplaced		
1992	Port Louis	Stephanie Raymond	Unplaced		
1991	Port Louis	Dhandevy Jeetun	Unplaced		
1990	Port Louis	Anita Ramgutty	Unplaced		
1989	Port Louis	Jacky Randabel	Unplaced		
Did not compete between 1980—1988
1979	Port Louis	Maria Chanea Allard	Unplaced		
1978	Did not compete				
1977	Port Louis	Danielle Marie Françoise Bouic	Unplaced		
1976	Port Louis	Marielle Tse Sik-Sun	Unplaced		
1975	Port Louis	Nirmala Sohun	Unplaced		

=== Miss International Mauritius ===
- : Declared as Winner
- : Ended as runner-up or top 5/6 qualification
- : Ended as one of the finalists or semifinalists
- : Ended as special awards winner

Year	District	Miss Maurice	Placement at Miss Universe	Special awards	Notes
Vandana Jeetah directorship — a franchise holder to Miss International from 2023
Did not compete since 2024―present
2023	Grand Port District	Karishma Hurlall	Unplaced		

=== Miss Supranational Mauritius ===
- : Declared as Winner
- : Ended as runner-up or top 5/6 qualification
- : Ended as one of the finalists or semifinalists
- : Ended as special awards winner

Year	District	Miss Maurice	Placement at Miss Universe	Special awards	Notes
Vandana Jeetah directorship — a franchise holder to Miss Universe from 2023
Did not compete since 2024―present
2023	Grand Port	Nilmani Devi Hurlall	Unplaced		
Nevin Rupear directorship — a franchise holder to Miss Supranational between 2018―2022
2022	Plaines Wilhems	Alexandrine Belle-Étoile	Top 12	Miss Supranational Africa	
2021	Moka	Thriya Hemraz	Did not compete		Appointed — Due to the impact of COVID-19 pandemic, no national pageant in 2020.
Due to the impact of COVID-19 pandemic, no competition held
2019	Rivière du Rempart	Urvashi Hureeram	Unplaced		
2018	Rodrigues	Marie Anoushka Ah Keng	Top 25	Miss Supranational Africa	

=== Mister Supranational Mauritius ===
- : Declared as Winner
- : Ended as runner-up or top 5/6 qualification
- : Ended as one of the finalists or semifinalists
- : Ended as special awards winner

Miss Estrella Mauritius produced Mister Maurice for the first time in 2021. The main winner represents Mauritius at Mister Supranational pageant.

Year	District	Mister Maurice	Placement at Mr Supranational	Special Awards	Notes
Nevin Rupear directorship — a franchise holder to Mister Supranational from 2022
Did not compete between 2023―present
2022	Port Louis	Jean-Laurent David	Unplaced		

== See also ==
- Miss Mauritius
