= Surinam, Mauritius =

Surinam
- Village
- Location within Mauritius
- Coordinates: 20°30′50″S 57°30′40″E
- Country: Mauritius
- Districts: Savanne District
- Elevation: 23 m (75 ft)

Population (2011)
  - Total: 10,507
- Time zone: UTC+4 (MUT)
- Area code: 230
- ISO 3166 code: MU

Surinam is a village located in the Savanne District of Mauritius. According to the 2011 census by Statistics Mauritius, the population was 10,507.

Nightingale College was a college in Surinam, Mauritius founded on 1 July 1964 by Seewooparsad Goolab. It was first located at Dr Sauzier's residence in Souillac. In 1965 it moved to L'Eglise St Jacques and in 1968 to a location near Souillac Hospital. It moved to Royal Road, Surinam in March 1970, where it remained until its takeover by the Ministry of Education.

== See also ==
- Districts of Mauritius
- List of places in Mauritius
