= Cap Malheureux =

- Village
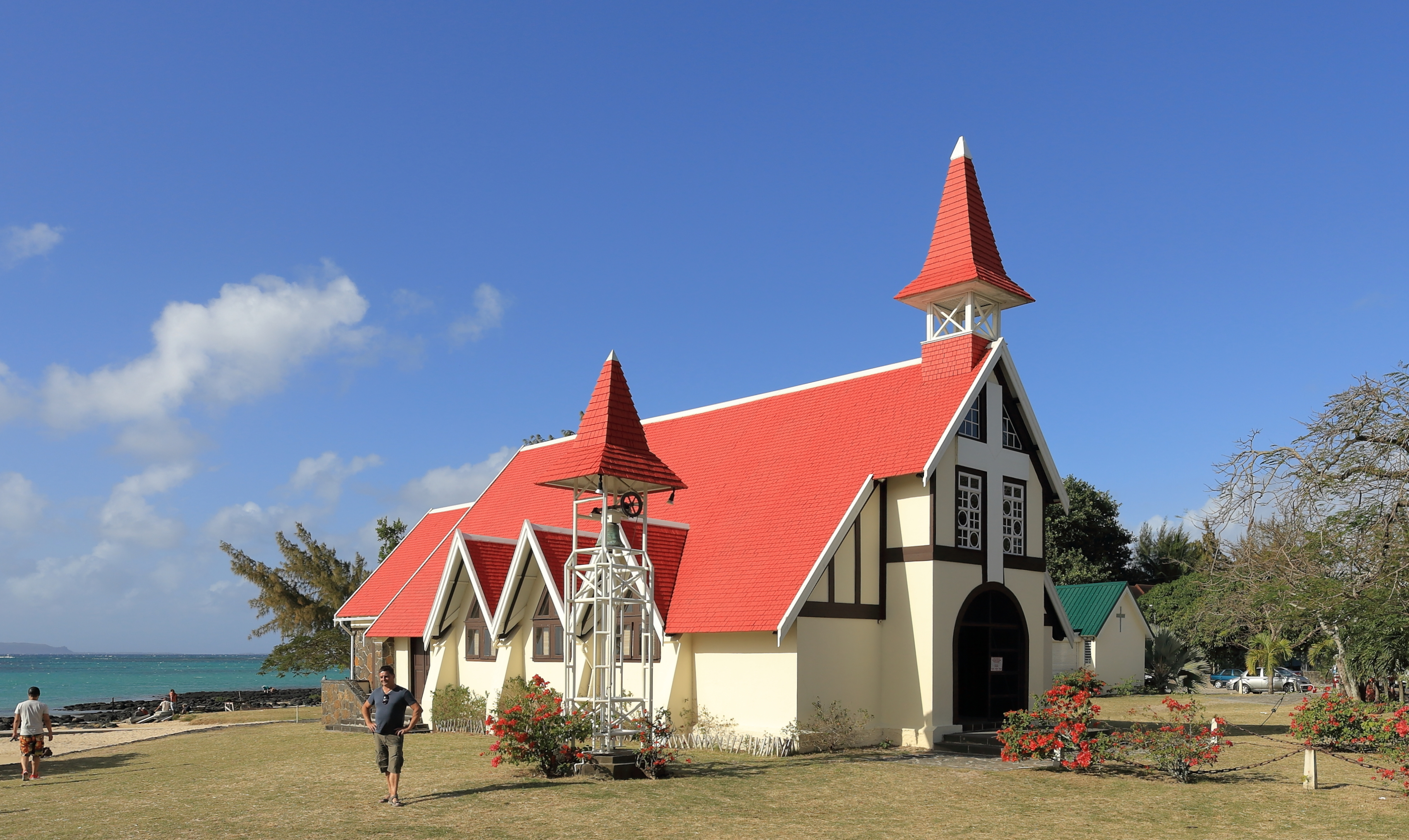
- Notre Dame Auxiliatrice at Cap Malheureux

- Location within Mauritius
- Coordinates: 19°59′10″S 57°36′43″E
- Country: Mauritius
- Districts: Rivière du Rempart District

Government

Population (2011)
  - Total: 5,070
  - Density: 509.5/km^{2} (1,320/sq mi)
- Time zone: UTC+4 (MUT)
- Area code: 230
- ISO 3166 code: MU

Cap Malheureux is a village in Mauritius located in Rivière du Rempart District. The village is administered by the Cap Malheureux Village Council under the aegis of the Rivière du Rempart District Council. According to the 2011 census by Statistics Mauritius, its population was 5,070.

== History ==
The name Cap Malheureux, meaning "Unlucky Cape", was given by the French who held the island from 1715 to 1810. The island was often the bone of contention of many great explorers of the time, including the British.

In 1810 the British decided to take the island in order to stop the raids on British fleets by the corsairs. Following an unsuccessful attempt to invade via Grand Port in the south in August 1810 (claimed as the only defeat in the Napoleonic Wars of the Royal Navy by the French), British navy and army forces from Bombay, Madras and the Cape of Good Hope took the French by surprise by landing in the North of the island, where the French defences were weakest. As a result, the French were defeated inland and over the years the area became known as Cap Malheureux as a reminder of the 1810 invasion.

== See also ==
- Districts of Mauritius
- List of places in Mauritius
