= Baie du Tombeau =

- Village
- Location within Mauritius
- Coordinates: 20°6′49.7916″S 57°30′23.6736″E
- Country: Mauritius
- Districts: Pamplemousses District

Government

Population (2011)
  - Total: 14,687
  - Density: 1,963.5/km^{2} (5,085/sq mi)
- Time zone: UTC+4 (MUT)
- Area code: 230
- ISO 3166 code: MU

Baie du Tombeau is a village in Mauritius located in the Pamplemousses District, situated near the Rivière du Tombeau. The village is administered by the Baie du Tombeau Village Council under the aegis of the Pamplemousses District Council. According to the census by Statistics Mauritius in 2011, the population was at 14,687.

Baie du Tombeau was home to HMS Mauritius, a Royal Navy wireless station.

The bay itself faces west to North-West and has 3 km of coral reef protecting a shallow lagoon and sandy beaches stretching from Rivulet Terre rouge bird sanctuary to the Tombeau river's estuary at Le Goulet.

The area is particularly appreciated for its easy access to the capital Port Louis (in less than 10 minutes) and for its convenient facilities as well as proximity to the large Riche Terre shopping mall.

The weather is pleasant being less windy or rainy than the east coast or central plateau and not as hot as the south west.

Riche Terre Mall is found in the vicinity and easily accessible for shopping, a day-out and for dining. The mall provides free parking for visitors and has a bus stop.

== See also ==
- Districts of Mauritius
- List of places in Mauritius
