= Stephen Hobbs (priest) =

Stephen Hobbs (1815–1893) was an Anglican Archdeacon.

Hobbs was educated at the Church Missionary Society College, Islington and ordained in 1839. He served in India at Palamcottah, Tinnevelly, Nallur, Sathankulam, Dohnavur and Suviseshapuram. In 1856 he was transferred to Mauritius, serving firstly at Plaines Wilhems then Creve coeur. He was appointed Archdeacon of the Seychelles from 1871 until 1873; then of Mauritius from 1873 to 1879.
