= Rivière Du Poste =

- Village
- Location within Mauritius
- Coordinates: 20°25′43.4″S 57°34′29.8″E
- Country: Mauritius
- Districts: Savanne and Grand Port district

Government

Population (2011)
  - Total: 2,170
  - Density: 385.4/km^{2} (998/sq mi)
- Time zone: UTC+4 (MUT)
- Postal/ZIP Code: 60703
- Area code: 230
- ISO 3166 code: MU

Rivière Du Poste is a village in the southern part of Mauritius located in both Savanne and Grand Port districts. The locality is about 19 miles (30 km) south of Port Louis, the nation's capital. The village is administered by the Rivière du Poste Village Council under the aegis of the Savanne District Council. According to the census made by Statistics Mauritius in 2011, the population was 2,170. The neighboring villages are La Flora (north west), Mare Tabac and Rose Belle (north east) and Camp Diable and Riviere Dragon in the south of the village.

== History ==
Rivière du Poste is named after the second largest river in Mauritius which crosses by the village and separates it into two districts: Savanne and Grand Port. The local post office opened in 1909 which was before the railway station.

A popular attraction is the Pont Rouge (English: Red bridge), an old railway track which is now used by pedestrians to cross the river. There are numerous attractions such as waterfalls across the river at different spots.

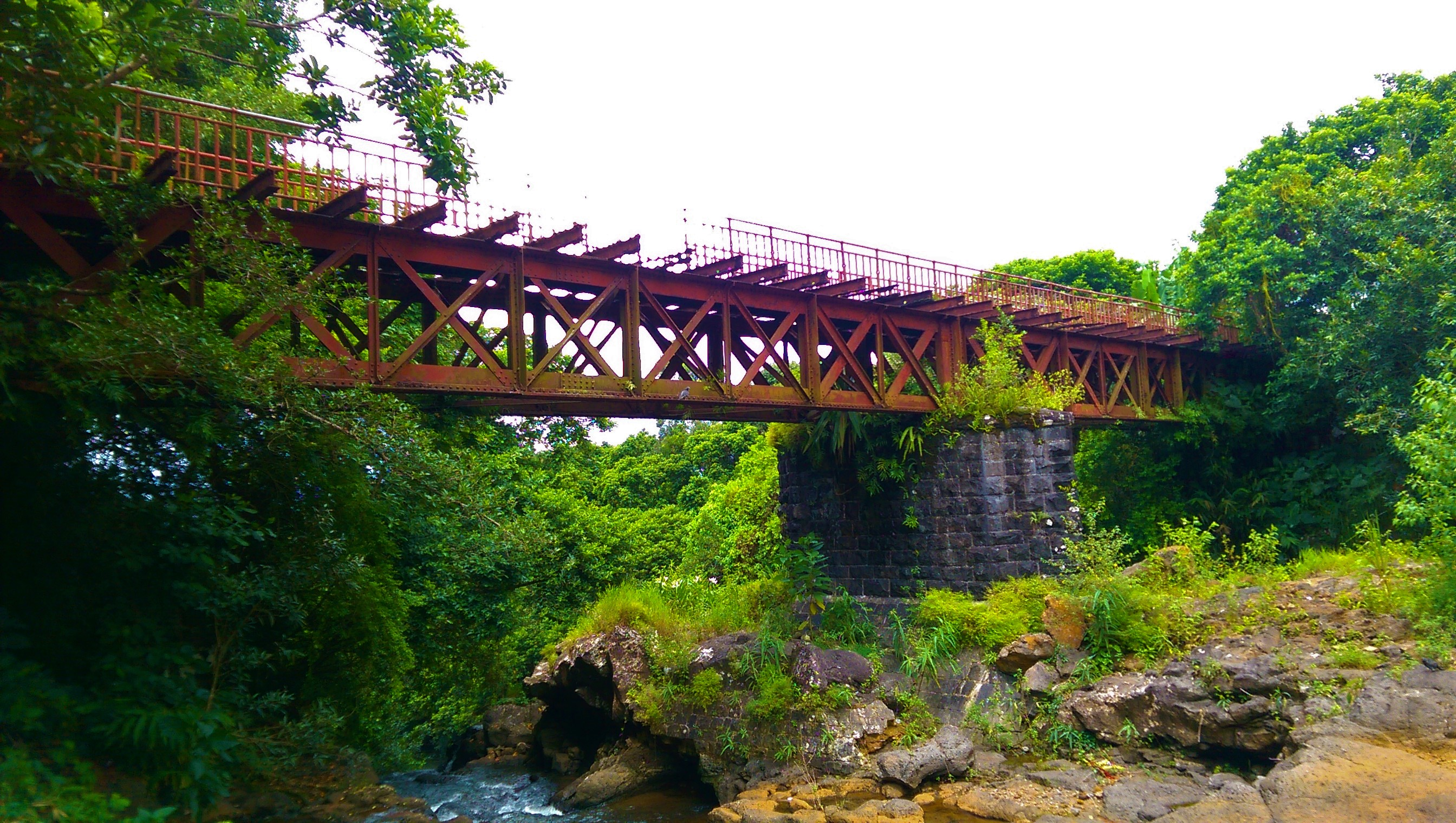
Old railway bridge crossing Rivière du Poste River

== Sub locality ==
The village itself is divided into four parts:

- Camp Rabaud 60701
- Camp Siajee 60702
- Terrain Maurice 60704
- Rivière Du Poste 60703

== See also ==
- Districts of Mauritius
- List of places in Mauritius
