= Fond du Sac =

- Village
- Location within Mauritius
- Coordinates: 20°2′44″S 57°35′5″E
- Country: Mauritius
- Districts: Pamplemousses District

Government

Population (2011)
  - Total: 5,186
  - Density: 377.7/km^{2} (978/sq mi)
- Time zone: UTC+4 (MUT)
- Area code: 230
- ISO 3166 code: MU

Fond du Sac is a village in Mauritius located in Pamplemousses District. The village is administered by the Fond du Sac Village Council under the aegis of the Pamplemousses District Council. According to the 2011 census by Statistics Mauritius, the population was 5,186.

== See also ==
- Districts of Mauritius
- List of places in Mauritius
