= Chemin-Grenier =

- Village
- Location within Mauritius
- Coordinates: 20°29′21.56″S 57°27′55.26″E
- Country: Mauritius
- Districts: Savanne District

Government

Population (2011)
  - Total: 12,223
  - Density: 1,413.1/km^{2} (3,660/sq mi)
- Time zone: UTC+4 (MUT)
- Area code: 230
- ISO 3166 code: MU

Chemin-Grenier is a village in Mauritius located in Savanne District. The village is administered by the Chemin-Grenier Village Council under the aegis of the Savanne District Council. According to the 2011 census by Statistics Mauritius, the village population was 12,223.

== See also ==
- Districts of Mauritius
- List of places in Mauritius
