= Bel Air Rivière Sèche =

- Village
- Location within Mauritius
- Coordinates: 20°15′29.628″S 57°45′16.0698″E
- Country: Mauritius
- District: Flacq

Government

Population (2011)
  - Total: 17,605
  - Density: 970/km^{2} (2,500/sq mi)
- Time zone: UTC+4 (MUT)
- Postal code: 40101-40112
- Climate: Af

Bel Air Rivière Sèche, more often referred to simply as Bel Air, is a village in the Flacq district of Mauritius. The village is administered by the Bel Air Rivière Sèche Village Council under the aegis of the Flacq District Council. According to the census by Statistics Mauritius in 2011, the population of the village was 17,605.

== See also ==
- Districts of Mauritius
- List of places in Mauritius
