= Grand Bois, Mauritius =

Village in Savanne, Mauritius

Grand Bois
- Village
- Location within Mauritius
- Coordinates: 20°25′08″S 57°32′39″E
- Country: Mauritius
- Districts: Savanne District
- Elevation: 23 m (75 ft)

Population (2015)
  - Total: 7,982
- Time zone: UTC+4 (MUT)
- Area code: 230
- ISO 3166 code: MU

Grand Bois is a village located in the Savanne District of Mauritius. According to the 2015 census by Statistics Mauritius, the population was 7,982. As from 2025 the chairman of the village council is Mr Mouhinuddin Rujee

== History ==
Grand Bois village was formerly known as Bois Le Grand after Mr. Le Grand who owned most of the land in this region and also because there were dense forests nearby. Slowly people started calling the locality as " Le Grand Bois " and finally "Grand Bois". A street opposite the village's primary school still bears the name Le Grand Branch Road.

== Localities ==
The localities of Kanaka, Mexico and Camp Bananes form part of the Grand Bois Village area. It is also surrounded by other villages which form part of Savanne District such as La Flora in the north and Bois Chéri in the west which are well known for tea plantations. On the east of Grand Bois there is the village of Rivière Du Poste and further south the village of Britannia is located.

== Tourist attractions ==
Trou Kanaka is an extinct volcanic crater which is found north-west from the village of Grand Bois and is considered a tourist attraction.

Grand Bassin is an extinct volcano which is found 8 kilometres in the west of Grand Bois.

== Schools ==
Grand Bois Gouvernment School is a primary school which is located along the main road of the village. Originally this was a Roman Catholic school housed within a chapel. Children from the surrounding villages of Grand Bois, Bois Cheri and La Flora used to attend this school.

In 1945 the old chapel was destroyed by a tropical cyclone. It was subsequently rebuilt by volunteers, students and it received the support of the Catholic church. The first headteacher was Mr. Précieux who was later succeeded by Patrick Angseesing. The school was then purchased by the government and it became known as the Grand Bois Government School. In the 1960s two new buildings were constructed with concrete walls and corrugated iron sheet roofing . A two-storey concrete building was added in 1973. In 1997 a new pre-primary block was constructed. In Bois Chéri a feeder school was opened in the 1950s to cater for children of the village. In La Flora a new school was opened in the 1960s.

== See also ==
- Districts of Mauritius
- List of places in Mauritius
