= Grand Baie =

Grand Baie Grand Bay
- Village
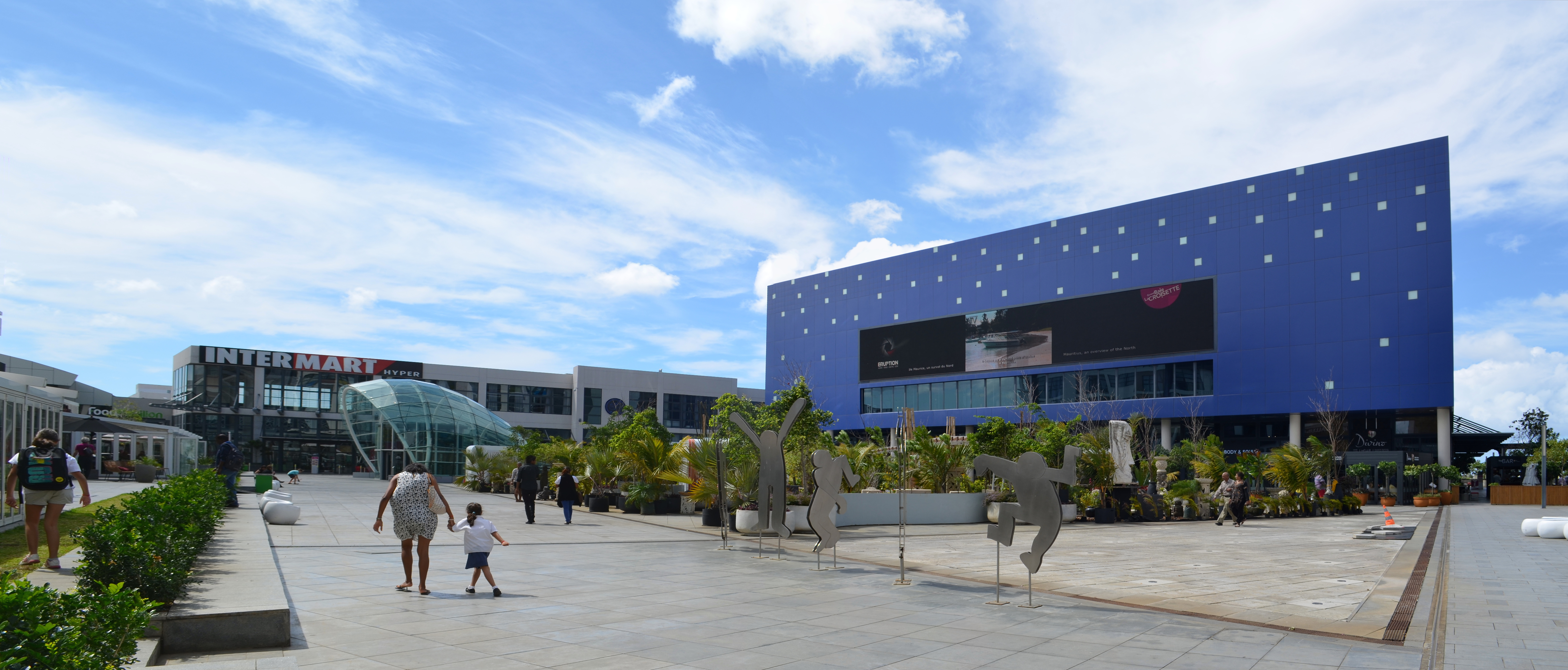
- La Croisette in Grand Baie

- Location within Mauritius
- Coordinates: 20°00′47″S 57°35′04″E
- Country: Mauritius
- Districts: Rivière du Rempart District

Government

Population (2011)
  - Total: 11,910
  - Density: 793.5/km^{2} (2,055/sq mi)
- Time zone: UTC+4 (MUT)
- Area code: 230
- ISO 3166 code: MU

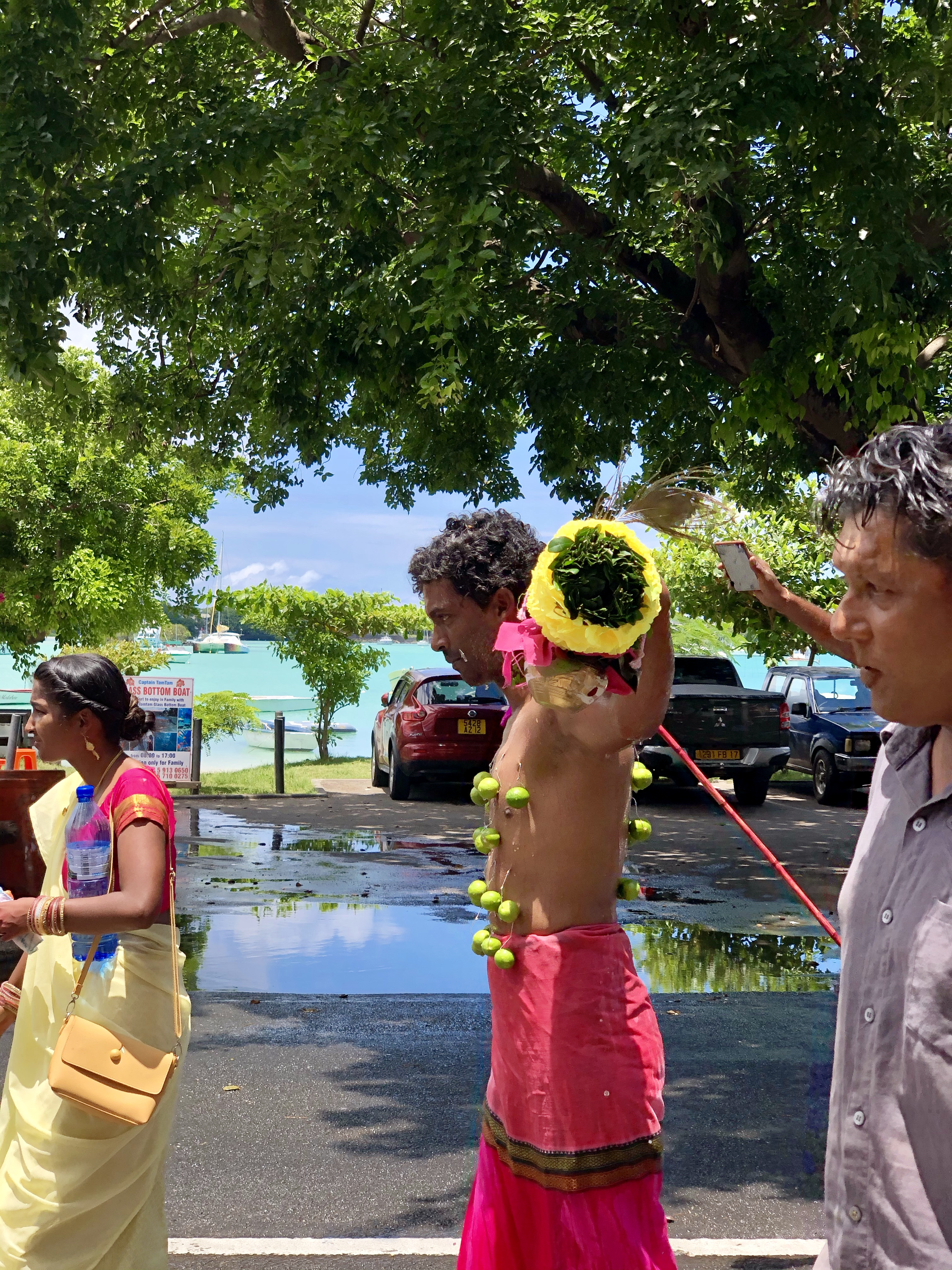
Thaipusam celebration in Grand Baie.

Grand Baie (or sometimes Grand Bay) is a coastal village in Mauritius located mainly in the Rivière du Rempart District. The western part of the village lies inside the Pamplemousses District. The village is administered by the Grand Baie Village Council under the aegis of the Rivière du Rempart District Council. According to the census by Statistics Mauritius in 2011, the population was at 11,910.

Grand-Baie La Croisette is the third shopping mall built in Mauritius. It is owned by MaxCity Properties. There was a gruesome accident on an escalator in the shopping mall on 23 November 2024.

== Gallery ==
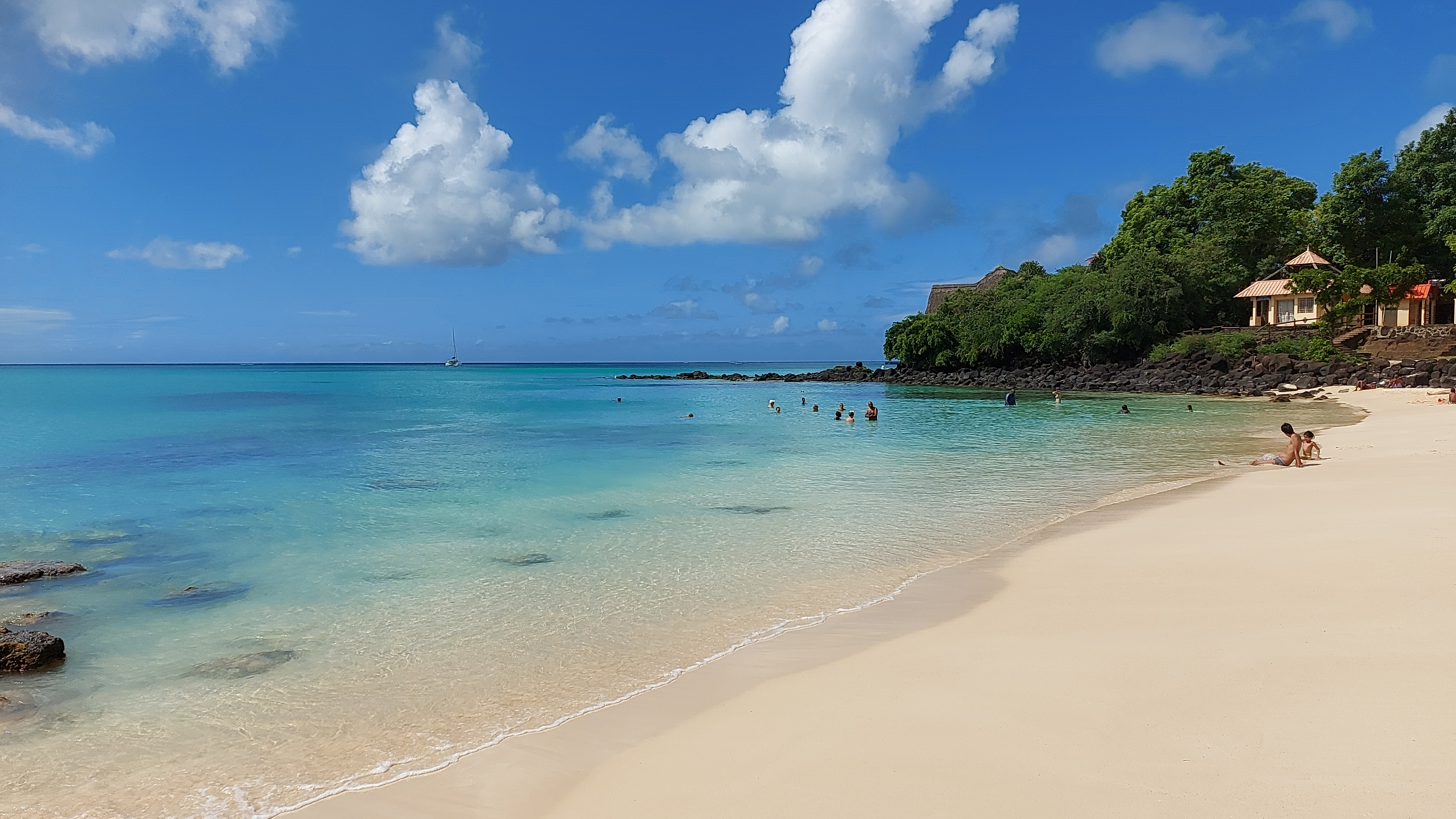
La Cuvette Beach

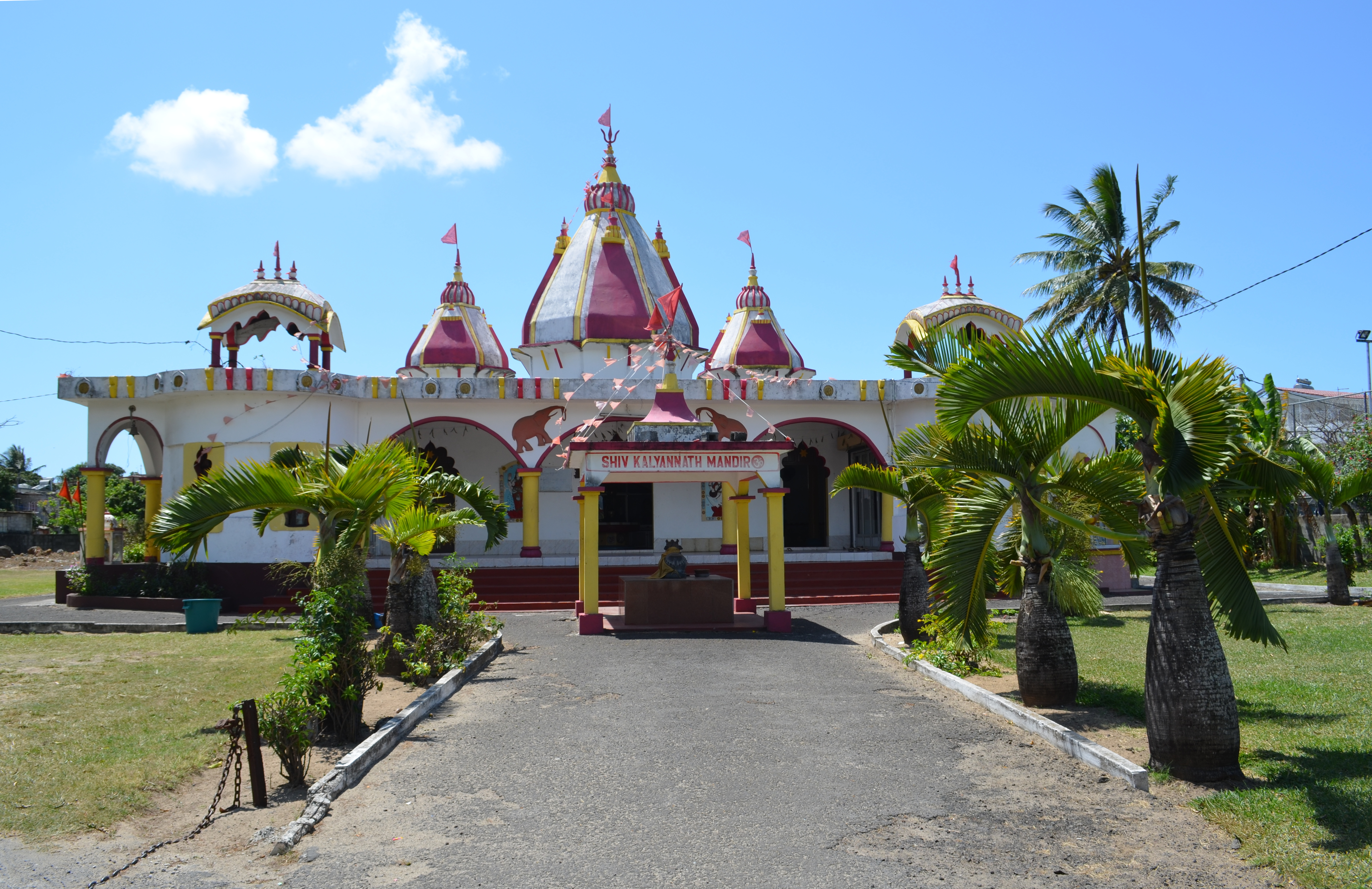
Hindu temple

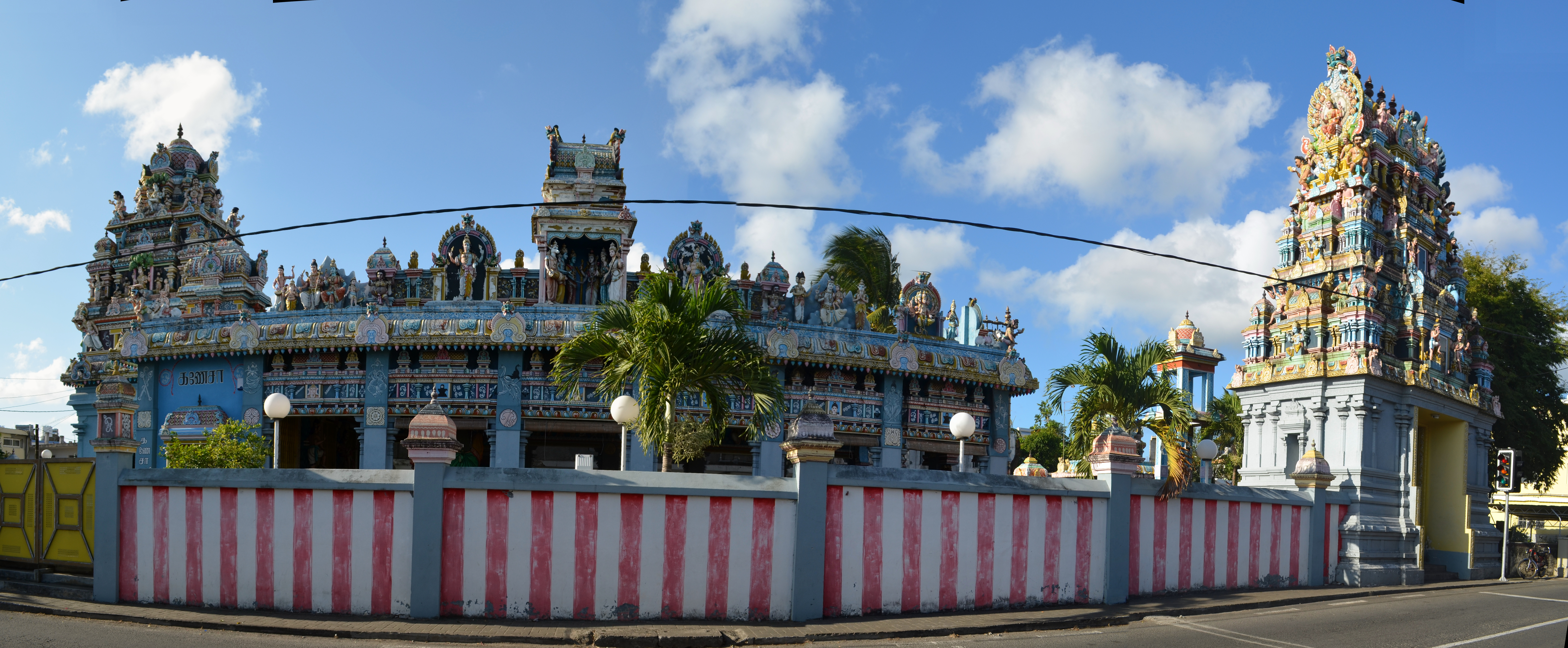
Tamil hindu temple

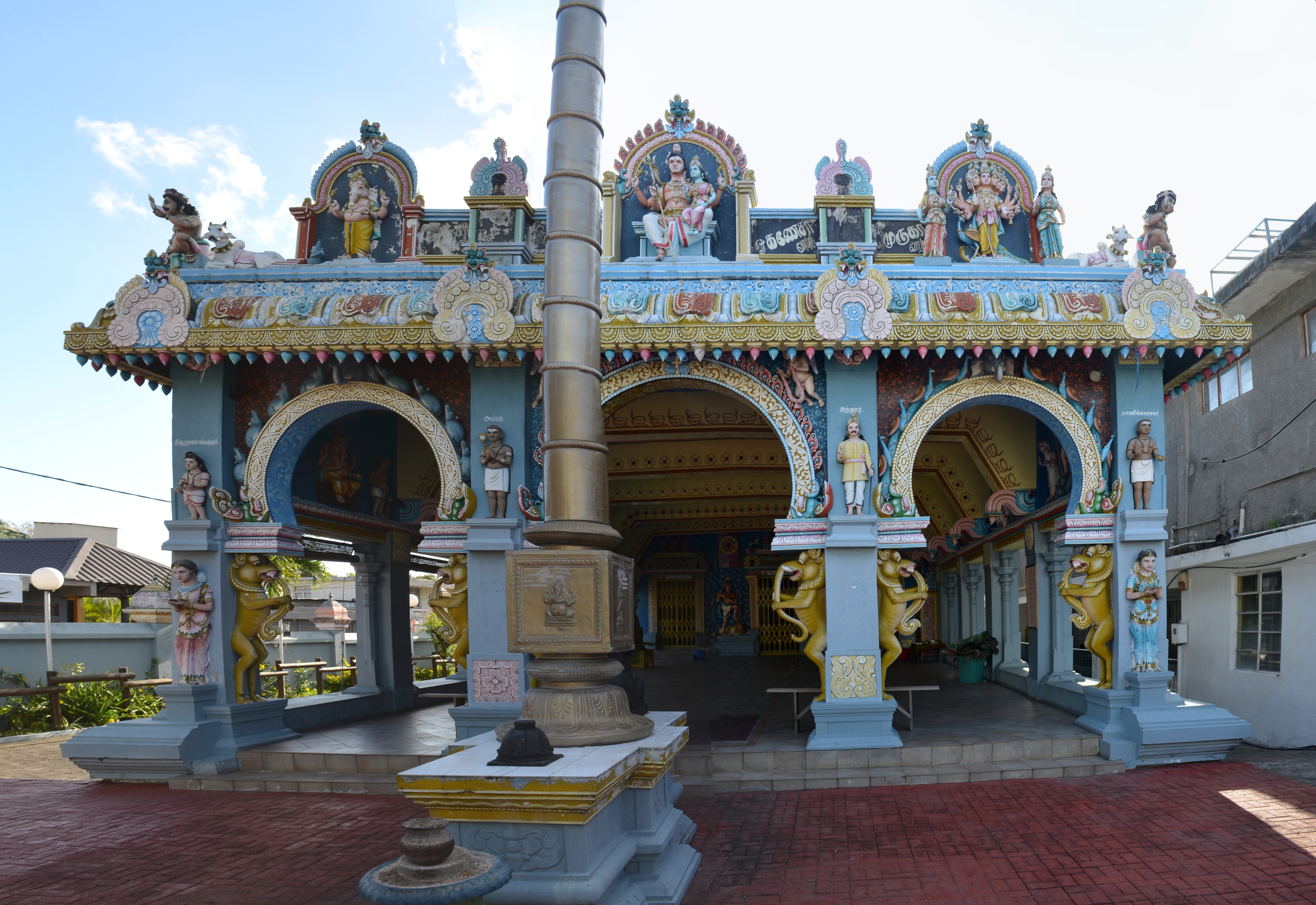
Tamil hindu temple

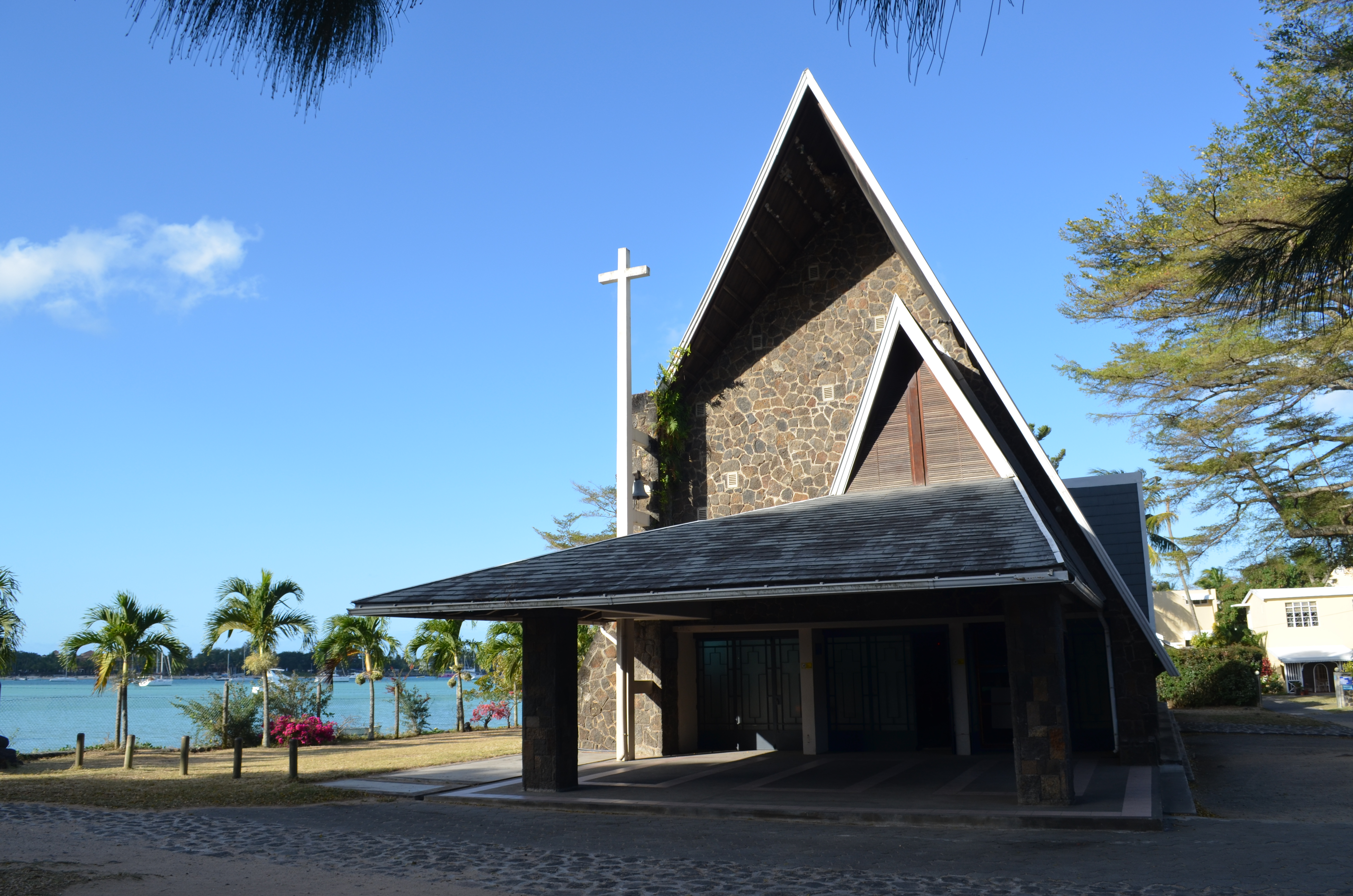
Catholic church

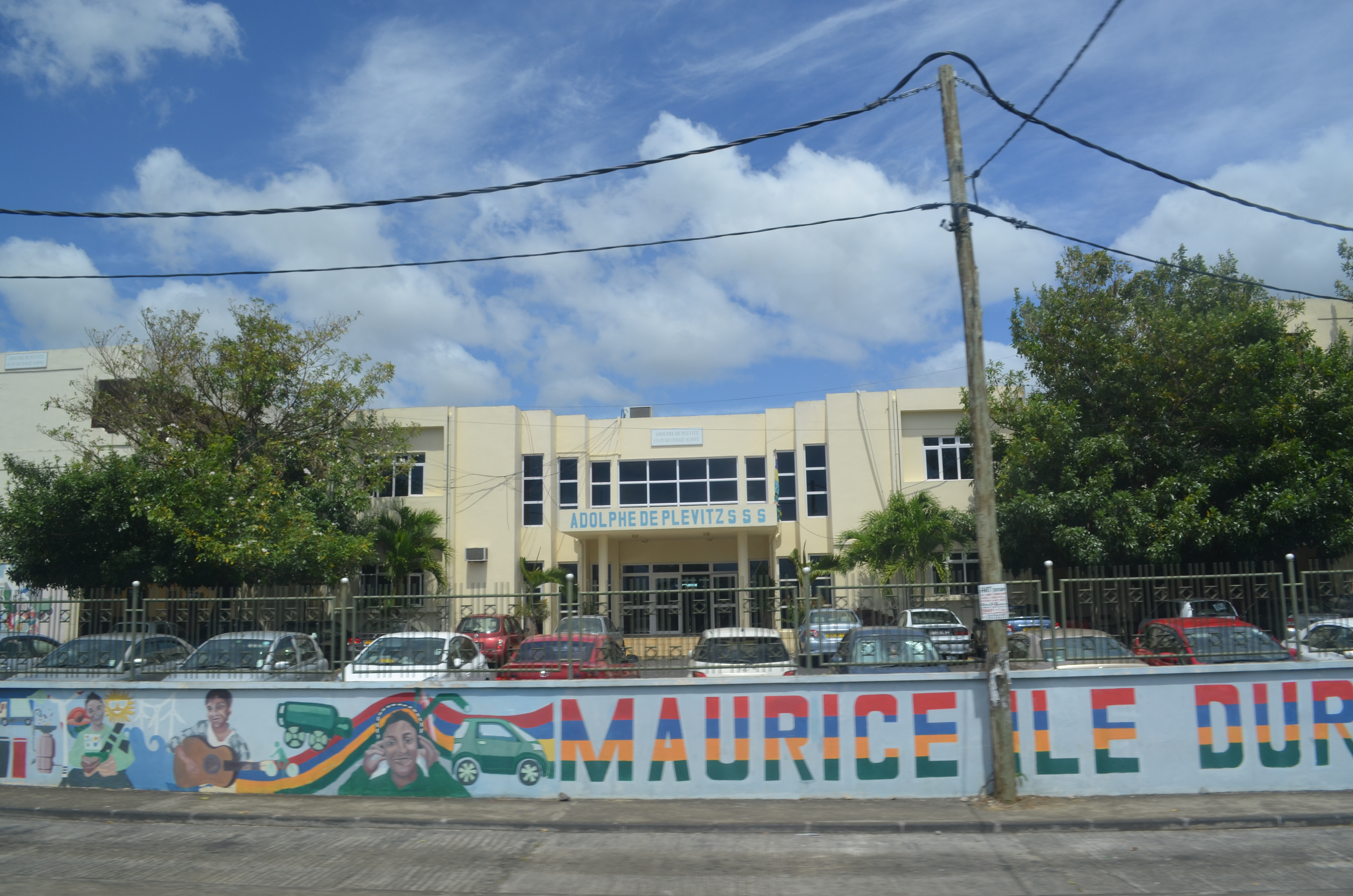
Secondary School

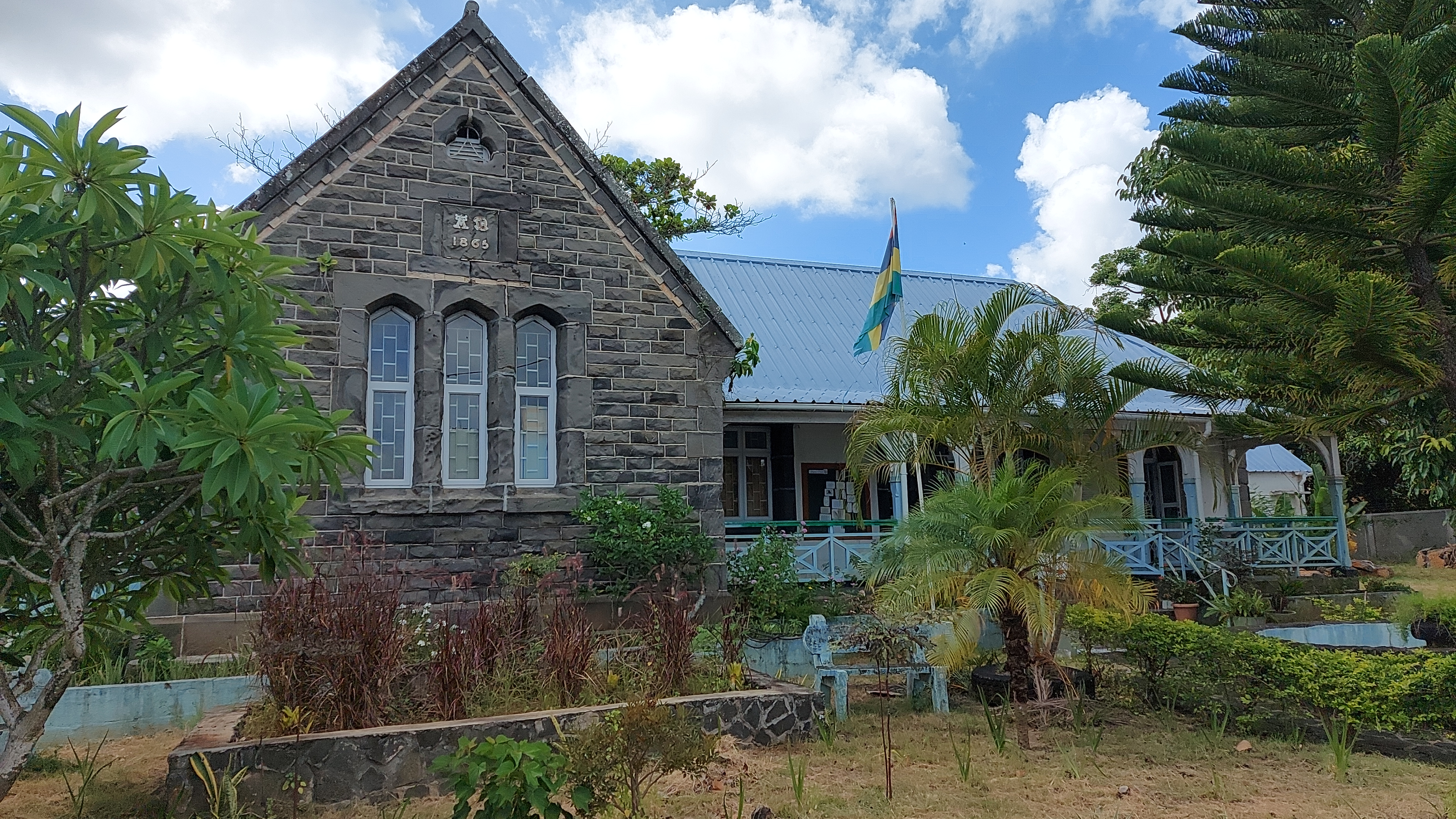
Public library

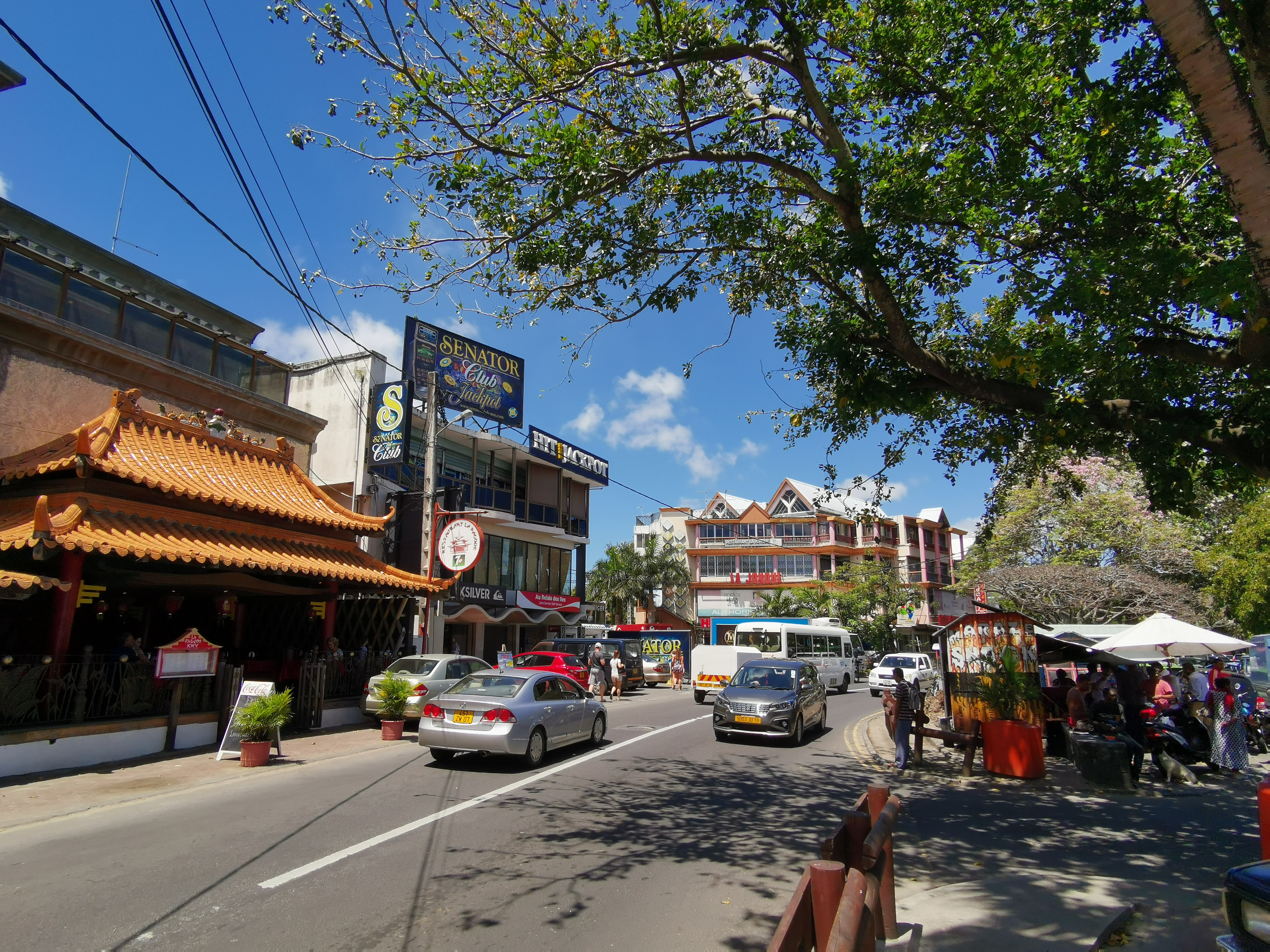
Street view

== See also ==
- Districts of Mauritius
- List of places in Mauritius
