= Bel Ombre, Mauritius =

Bel Ombre
- Village
- Motto: Lamer, Later, Lavi; Meaning: Sea, Land, Life
- Location within Mauritius
- Coordinates: 20°30′15.00″S 57°24′50″E
- Country: Mauritius
- Districts: Savanne District

Government

Population (2011)
  - Total: 2,417
  - Density: 57.5/km^{2} (149/sq mi)
- Time zone: UTC+4 (MUT)
- Area code: 230
- ISO 3166 code: MU

Bel Ombre is a village in Mauritius located in Savanne District. The village is administered by the Bel-Ombre Village Council under the aegis of the Savanne District Council. According to the 2011 census by Statistics Mauritius, the population was 2,417.

== Bel Ombre Nature Reserve ==
The Bel Ombre Nature Reserve, (formerly known as Heritage Nature Reserve, changed in 2022) is a nature reserve in Bel Ombre. It is the largest nature reserve in Mauritius, being 1,300 ha. It fairly looks like the African savannah.

=== La Resèrve Golf links ===
La Resèrve Golf Links is a golf course connected to Bel Ombre Nature Reserve and was opened in December 2023. It includes 2 lakes; Digue Rouillard and A. Dennis Taylor Dam.

=== Frédérica Nature Reserve ===
The Frédérica Nature Reserve is a reserve that forms part of Bel Ombre Nature Reserve.

It includes the Frèdèrica Lodge, a lodge used for hunters, and the Frédérica Old Sugar Mill, used from 1855 to 1874. It includes 2 biomes, the endemic forests and grasslands. There are 3 viewpoints; the Frédérica Viewpoint, the Dalsing Viewpoint and the Viewpoint des Cipayes.

There are two waterfalls; Cascade Frédérica, where you can have a picnic and swim, and Cascade l'Exemple, also where you can swim.

=== Wildlife ===
==== Flora ====
The endemic flora of the Bel Ombre Nature Reserve includes the Bois de natte (Labourdonnaisia glauca), Vacoas (Pandanus barklyi), Black Ebony (Diospyros tesselaria), Bois d’olive (Cassine orientalis), Palms (Dictyosperma album), Barleria (Barleria observatrix), Colophane bâtard and Colophane (Protium obtusifolium and Canarium paniculatum), Bois bouquet banane (Ochna mauritiana), Fandia (Alsophila borbonica var. sevathiana), Bois banane (Gaertnera psychotrioides), Bois tambour (Tambourissa peltata) and orchids (Jumellea recta). The exotic Albizia are commonly found.

==== Birds ====
The endemic and indigenous birds found in Bel Ombre Nature Reserve include the Mauritius Kestrel (Falco punctatus), Mauritius Bulbul (Hypsipetes olivaceus), Paille-en-queue (Phaethon lepturus), Pic-pic (Zosterops mauritianus), Echo Parakeet (Psittacula eques), Coq des bois (Terpsiphone bourbonnensis desolata), Mauritius fody (Foudia rubra) and the Pink pigeon (Nesoenas mayeri).

==== Mammals ====
The mammals of the Bel Ombre Nature Reserve include the endemic Mauritius Fruit Bats (Pteropus niger), Wild boar (Sus scrofa), Macaques (Macaca fascicularis) and the very common Java deer (Rusa timorensis).

=== Coordinates ===
20°30′03″S 57°26′26″E

== Resorts ==
- Heritage Awali Golf and Spa Resort
- Outrigger Mauritius Beach Resort
- Heritage Le Telfair Golf and Wellness Resort
- Tamassa

== See also ==
- Districts of Mauritius
- List of places in Mauritius
