= Souillac =

Souillac may refer to:

- Souillac, Lot, a commune in the Lot department, France
- Souillac, Mauritius, a village in the district of Savanne, Mauritius
