= Mapou (village) =

- Village
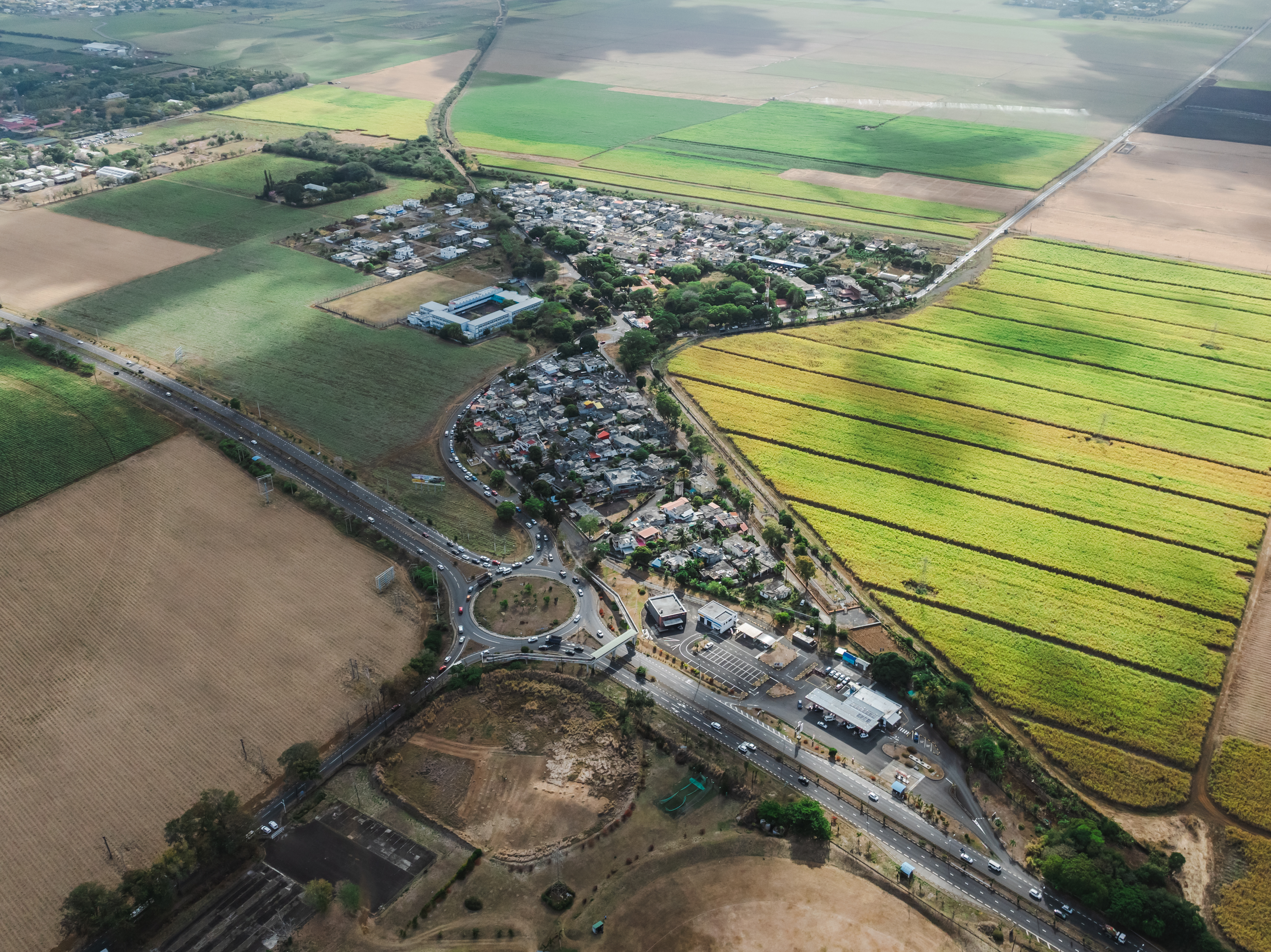

- Location within Mauritius
- Coordinates: 20°4′45″S 57°36′31″E
- Country: Mauritius
- District: Rivière du Rempart District

Population (2011)
  - Total: 1,275
- Time zone: UTC+4 (MUT)
- ISO 3166 code: MU
- Climate: Am

Mapou is a village in northern Mauritius, located in Rivière du Rempart District. The village is administered by the Mapou Village Council under the aegis of the Rivière du Rempart District Council. According to the census by Statistics Mauritius in 2011, the population was 1,275.

== Places of interest ==
The village is mostly known for being home to The Château de Labourdonnais, a colonial house dating from 1859 and which sits on a property dating from 1777. The house has been converted to a museum about colonial life in the island of Mauritius and a restaurant. Other facilities on the domain include the gardens and orchards and the "Rhumerie des Mascareignes" Rum distillery which produces the "La Bourdonnais" and "Rhumeur" brands of rum. Fruits from the orchard are used to produce the "Labourdonnais" range of products such as jellies, jams and fruit juice.

== Education ==
- Mapou Government School.
- International Preparatory School running since 1989.
- Northfields International School operated since 2001.
- Shri Beekrumsing Ramlallah State Secondary Source, renamed from Mapou State Secondary School or Mapou SSS in 2006, has been running since 2002.

== See also ==
- List of places in Mauritius
- Cyphostemma mappia
