= 1891 Mauritian general election =

General elections were held in Mauritius in 1891.

== Electoral system ==
The 1885 constitution provided for a 28-member Legislative Council, which consisted of the Governor, 12 officials, 5 appointed members and 10 elected members. The ten elected members were returned from nine constituencies formed from the nine districts, which all districts returning one member except Port Louis, which returned two.

The franchise for the elections was severely limited; the right to vote was restricted to people with ₨300 of immovable property or movable property worth ₨3,000, a monthly salary of ₨50, those paying rent of ₨25 a month or paying a licence duty of at ₨200 a year. People married to eligible voters, or the oldest son of a qualifying widow were also entitled to vote. As a result, although the population of Mauritius was around 370,000, only 5,164 people were eligible to vote, of which just 401 were Asian.
