= Goodlands, Mauritius =

Goodlands
- Village
- Location within Mauritius
- Coordinates: 20°2′6″S 57°38′35.00″E
- Country: Mauritius
- Districts: Rivière du Rempart District

Government

Population (2011)
  - Total: 20,712
  - Density: 1,239.5/km^{2} (3,210/sq mi)
- Time zone: UTC+4 (MUT)
- Area code: 230
- ISO 3166 code: MU

Goodlands is a medium-sized village in northern Mauritius located in Rivière du Rempart District. The village is administered by the Goodlands Village Council under the aegis of the Rivière du Rempart District Council. It is one of the most populated villages in Mauritius. According to the 2011 census, the population was 20,712.

== See also ==
- Districts of Mauritius
- List of places in Mauritius
