= Le Hochet =

- Village
- Location within Mauritius
- Coordinates: 20°8′6″S 57°31′16″E
- Country: Mauritius
- Districts: Pamplemousses District
- Elevation: 38 m (125 ft)

Population (2011)
  - Total: 15,034
- Time zone: UTC+4 (MUT)
- Area code: 230
- ISO 3166 code: MU

Le Hochet is a village located in the Pamplemousses District of Mauritius. According to the 2011 census, the population was 15,034.

== See also ==
- Districts of Mauritius
- List of places in Mauritius
