= Roches Noires =

Roches Noires may refer to:

== Places ==
=== Morocco ===
- Roches Noires, Morocco, an arrondissement of eastern Casablanca, in the Aïn Sebaâ - Hay Mohammadi district of the Grand Casablanca region of Morocco.

=== Mauritius ===
- Roches Noires, Mauritius, a village in the district of Rivière du Rempart, Mauritius
