= Roches Noires, Mauritius =

Roches Noires
- Coordinates: 20°06′40″S 57°43′33.3″E
- Country: Mauritius
- District: Rivière du Rempart

Population (2022)
  - Total: 6,650

Roches Noire is a village located in the Rivière du Rempart district on the east coast of Mauritius.

It is located about 14 miles (23 kilometres) east of the capital Port Louis. It has an estimated population of 6650 inhabitants according to a 2022 census. Roches Noires is a residential area, with many bungalows and villas occupied as secondary residences. This part of the coast located near the village consists of several secluded coves of white sand beach. In several places around Roches Noires, the reef comes to within 50 meters of the shore.

Places of interest include the "La Cave Madame" in the Royal Road, the public beach, the lava tubes and the "Pointe de Roches Noires", also known as "La mer Milles".

There are plans to build a smart city in the area. It would encompass 10% of the 359 hectares between the village of Roches Noire and the coastal road. The project has been opposed by some villagers and environmentalists.

== History ==
La Cave Madame is a significant location for locals as it was formerly used by enslaved peoples as a hiding place.

== See also ==
- List of places in Mauritius
