= Pamplemousses District =

Pamplemousses
- District
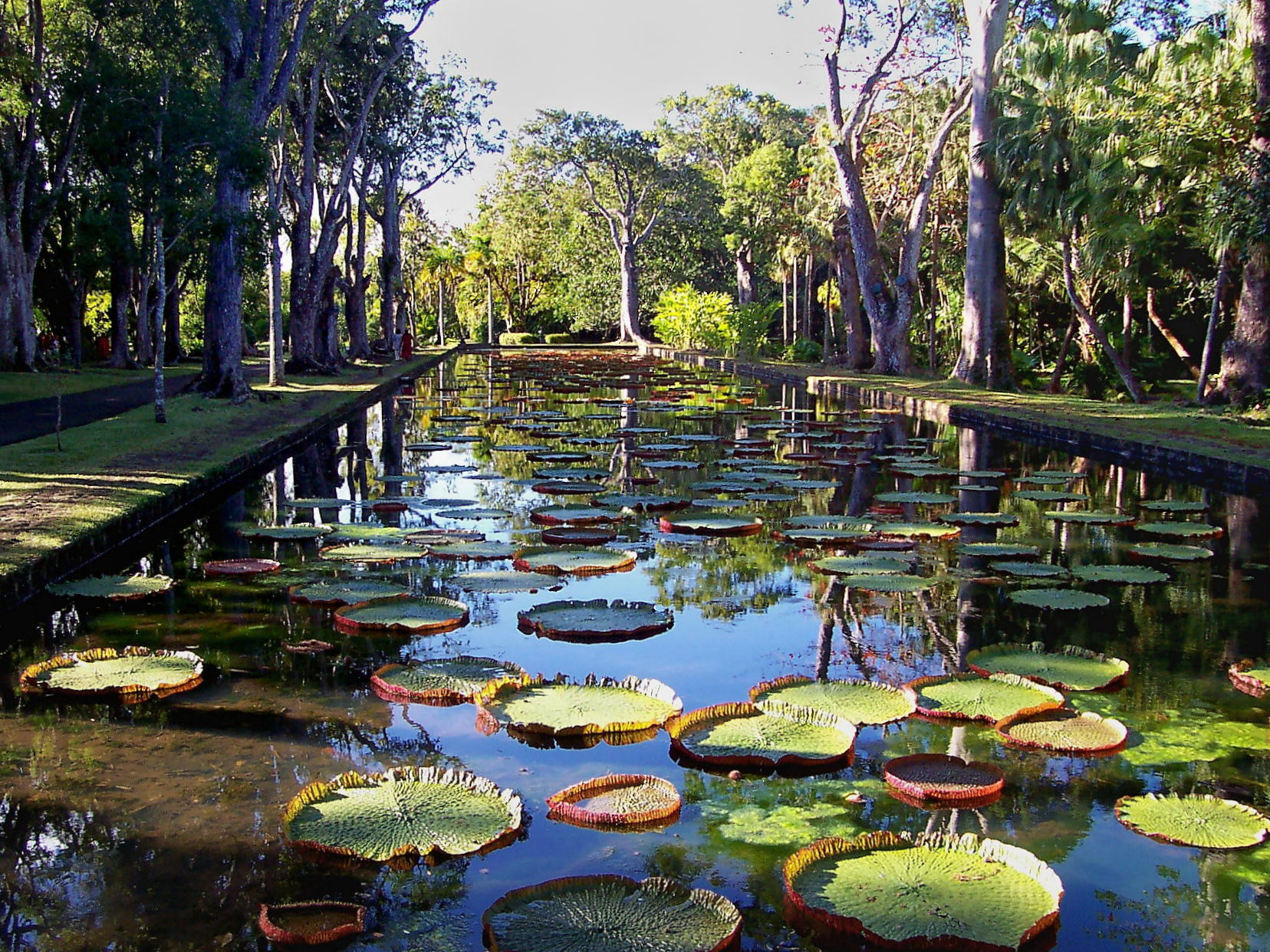
- Pamplemousses Botanical Garden

- Map of Mauritius island with Pamplemousses District highlighted
- Coordinates: 20°07′S 57°35′E
- Country: Mauritius

Government
  - Type: District council
  - Chairman: Mr. Somaroo Kalicharan
  - Vice chairman: Mr. Coomasamy Canarapen

Area
  - Total: 178.7 km^{2} (69.0 sq mi)

Population (2015)
  - Total: 139,966
  - Rank: 3rd in Mauritius
  - Density: 783.2/km^{2} (2,029/sq mi)
- Time zone: UTC+4 (MUT)

Pamplemousses (Mauritian Creole pronunciation: [pɑ̃plemus]) is a district of Mauritius, located in the northwest of the island, and is one of the most densely populated parts of the island. The name of the district comes from the French word for grapefruits. The district has an area of 178.7 km^{2} and an estimated population of 139,966, as of 31 December 2015.

== Places of interest ==
The district hosts the SSR botanical garden, or Jardin Botanique Sir Seewoosagur Ramgoolam, renamed in 1988 in honor of the first prime minister of Mauritius. The garden was first constructed by Pierre Poivre (1719–1786) in 1770. The area is 25 hectares. The garden features spices, ebonies, sugar canes and many more. It also features lotuses as well as 85 varieties of palms from Central America, Asia, Africa and the islands around the Indian Ocean. The district is the home of the Pamplemousses SC local football team. L'Aventure du Sucre, a museum housed in a former sugar factory, explores the history of sugar production in Mauritius.

== Places ==
The Pamplemousses District includes different regions; however, some regions are further divided into different suburbs.

- Arsenal
- Baie-du-Tombeau
- Belle Vue Harel
- Calebasses
- Congomah
- Crève-Cœur
- D'Épinay
- Fond du Sac
- Grand Baie (eastern part in Rivière du Rempart District)
- Le Hochet
- Montagne Longue
- Mapou (northern part in Rivière du Rempart District)
- Morcellement Saint-André
- Notre-Dame
- Pamplemousses
- Piton (eastern part in Rivière du Rempart District)
- Plaine-des-Papayes
- Pointe-aux-Piments
- Terre-Rouge
- Triolet
- Trou-aux-Biches
- Ville-Bague (eastern part in Rivière du Rempart District)

== See also ==
- Districts of Mauritius
- List of places in Mauritius
