= Tyack =

Tyack or Tyacke is a Cornish surname. It is an ancient surname and the Tyacks were landowners at an early period. It is thought to be derived from a Celtic word for ploughman. William Tyack was escheator of the Leeward Islands in the reign of James II. The Tyackes of St Breock bore the arms: Arg. a fesse (or a chevron) between three bears' heads couped Sa.

Other bearers of the name:

- Dave Tyack, German musician
- David Tyack, American academic, Professor of Education
- Major General David Tyacke, British Army officer
- Jim Tyack, baseball player
- Les Tyack, Australian politician
- Ryan Tyack, Australian archer
- Sarah Tyacke, British historian of cartography
