= Lycée des Mascareignes =

Location
- Helvetia Saint Pierre Ile MAURICE
- Coordinates: 20.2270879°S 57.524617000000035°E

Information
- Website: lyceedesmascareignes.org

Lycée des Mascareignes is a private French international school in Saint Pierre, Moka, Mauritius. It serves senior high school classes (Seconde, Première, Terminale).
