= Souillac, Mauritius =

Souillac
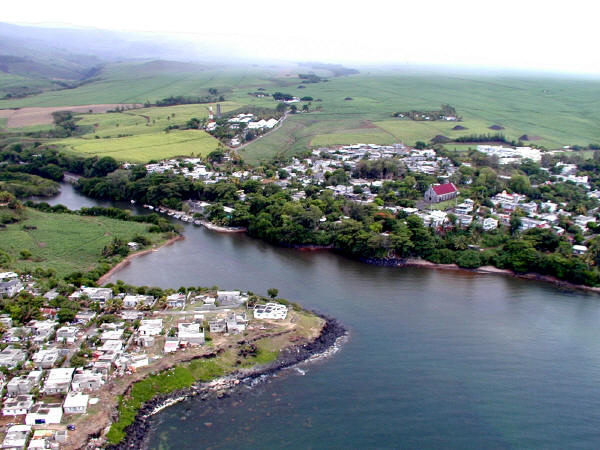
- View of the west part of Souillac village and the ancient port.

- Location within Mauritius
- Coordinates: 20°31′S 57°31′E
- Country: Mauritius
- Founded: 1787

Government
  - President of Village council: Unknown

Population
  - Total: Over 6,000
- Time zone: UTC+4 (MUT)

Souillac is a village close to the southernmost point of the main island of Mauritius. It is the seat of the district council of Savanne district. It was named after the Vicomte de Souillac, the island's governor from 1779-1787.

== History ==
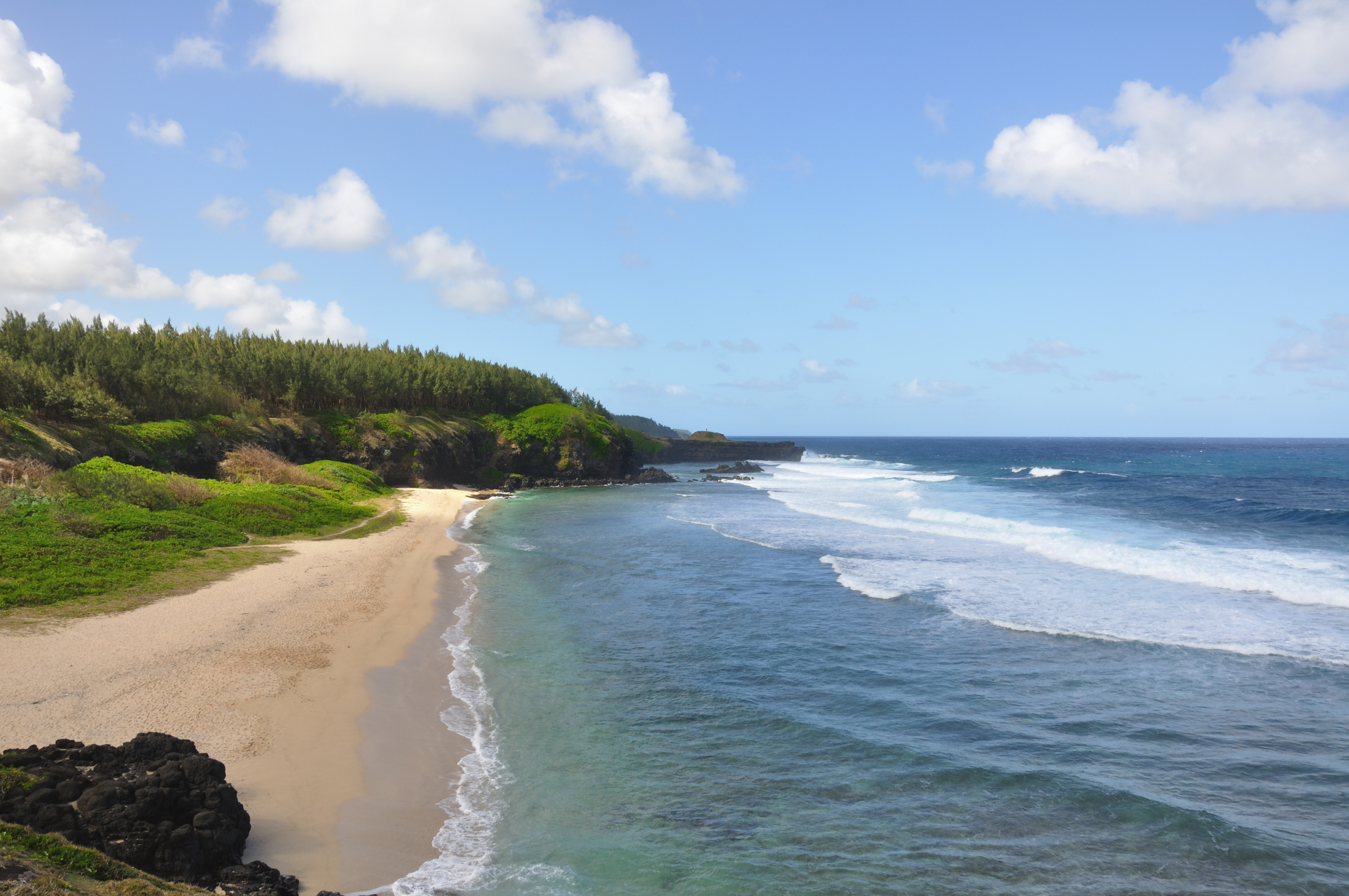
Gris Gris beach

In 1787, Vicomte de Souillac decided to establish a port for the south and southwest of the then Isle de France. At that time the island was an important port of call for the French vessels on their way to and from India. Strategically, the French also wanted a base for the defence of the southern coast. The most suitable place to erect a port was the southernmost point of the island where a large and deep estuary (formed by the Savanne River), without coral reefs, would permit the vessels to accost nearest to the land. The port would also be used for the transportation of agricultural products (including sugar) to Port Louis as no suitable road linked Port Louis with the southern part of the island at that time.

On 1 January 1787, a Royal Order ascribed to the locality the name of "Port Souillac", partly to honour the Vicomte's contribution to the development of the port. Vicomte de Souillac left Isle de France on 5 November 1787.

During the English colonisation, the port has been greatly used for the transportation of sugar from the many southern sugar factories to the Capital (Port Louis) making it the busiest seaport in the south. Its importance started to decrease with the introduction of railways on the island in 1877. With the development of other means of transport, the port became less and less used. However, by that time, the locality had already grown into a village. The village kept the name of Souillac.

== Population and geography ==
Initially, the village was mostly composed of fishing families. But with the development of agriculture (especially sugarcane plantations) and transport, its population quickly diversified. Above 6,000 inhabitants now live in the village. Inhabitants of Souillac are called Souillacois/es (which distinguishes the Souillac-Mauritius inhabitants from the Souillac-France inhabitants called "Souillagais/es").

=== Expansion ===
In the late 1980s, there was an expansion of the village with the vast majority of an ancient small sugarcane fields labourers locality called "Terracine" (which has now been almost completely destroyed) given land in the northern part of the village to build their houses.

Further expansions occurred when the inhabitants of another sugarcane field labourers locality called "Combo" were moved to Souillac.

=== Developments ===
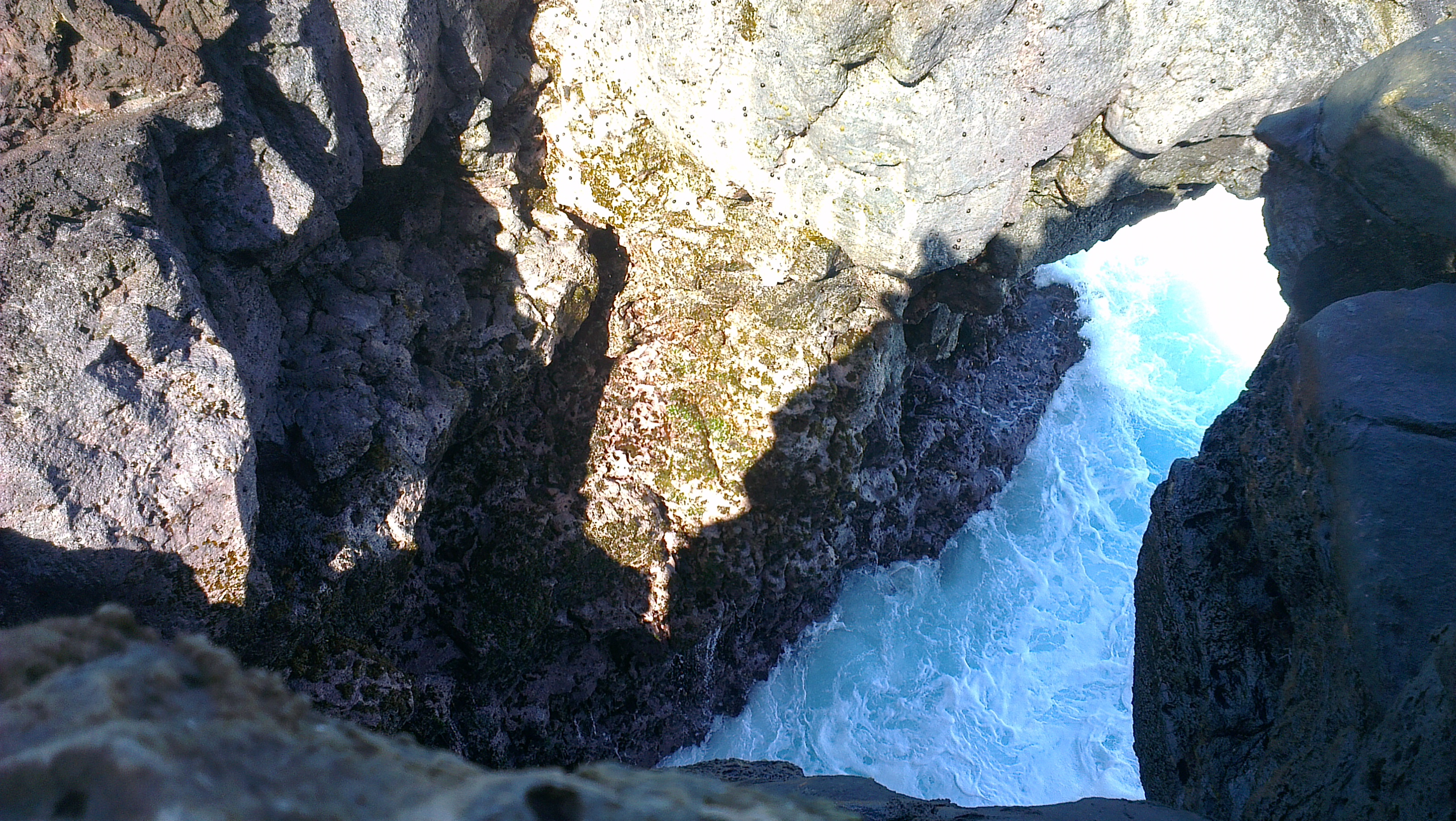
"La Roche Qui Pleure"

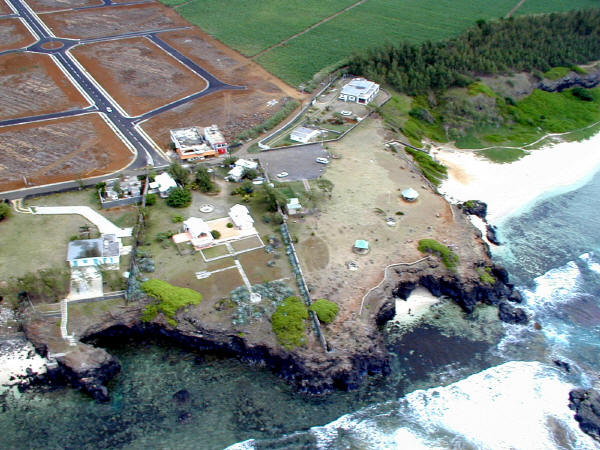
Part of Morcellement Gris-Gris before house constructions

More recently, a new quarter has been created, commonly known as the "Morcellement Gris-Gris". Houses have also been built along Laby Barkly Street, extending the village to its northeast.

=== Geography ===
Souillac is located in the southernmost part of the island. It is separated on the west from the village of Surinam by the Savanne river and on the east from the village of l'Union by the Bain des Négresses river. The main road snakes through the village from its northeast to its west, from the Bain des Négresses bridge to the Souillac/Surinam bridge. Although there is no official apportionment of the village, the local people often distinguish the parts of the village as follows: quartiers of Terracine, Combo, Brise de Mer, L'église, Pitot, Cité Gris-gris, Morcellement Gris-gris, EDC and L'Hopital.

=== Famous natives/inhabitants ===
Poet Robert Edward Hart whose house La Nef is now a museum, Mr Armand Maudave who was an educator, sportsman, captain of industry and a diplomat and Permanent Secretary and Mrs Liliane Dubois who was the first woman in Mauritius to be appointed Permanent Secretary

== Capital of Savanne District ==
Souillac is an important village in the southern region. Various State facilities and services are found in the village: The District Court of Savanne; the southern section of the Central Water Authority and the Central Electricity Board; the Southern section of the National Transport Corporation; a recently built modern hospital (which replaced the old Souillac hospital). The Post office of the village is also one of the oldest on the island and is housed in the building of the old train station. The Catholic church of St. Jacques was built in 1845.

== Places of interest ==
=== Telfair Garden ===
The Telfair Garden is a nice place near the seaside where the inhabitants often go for a picnic. The garden bears the name of Charles Telfair, a naturalist and land proprietor who developed the sugar estate of Bel Ombre. The garden is embellished by its big banyan and almond trees. A walking path links the Telfair Garden with the locally well-known Lavoir".

=== Gris-Gris ===
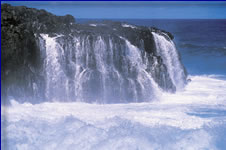
Gris-Gris

Gris-Gris is well known for its sea cliff. This part of the island is not surrounded by coral reefs. Heavy waves crash directly on the cliffs. The most spectacular part of Gris-gris is the "Roche Qui Pleure" where the constant breaking of waves against the flanks of the cliff gives the impression that the cliff is crying. The place is very much visited by tourists.

=== Batelage ===
Batelage is the ancient port of Souillac. The embarkment has been renovated and reconditioned to be used as a landing stage for the local fishermen's pirogues. The building next to the port, which was originally used to stock sugar and other products to be embarked, has also been renovated. It is now used as the Village hall for the Village Council. Another part of the building is used as a station for the National Coast Guard of Mauritius and the last part of the building is now a restaurant named "Le Batelage".

=== La Nef ===
La Nef is a museum and former home of Mauritian poet Robert Edward Hart.

=== Rochester Falls ===
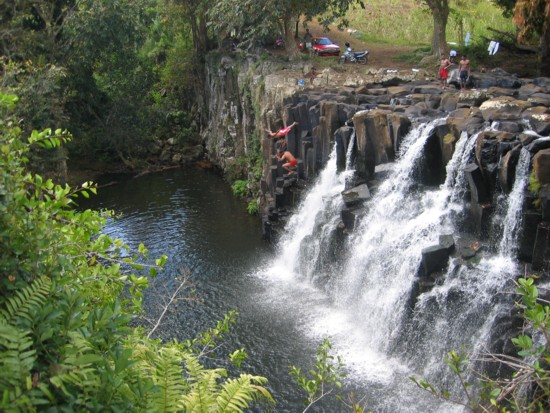
Rochester Falls

Rochester Falls is a waterfall on the Savanne River. It is famous for the strange rectangular form of its rocky flank.

It is located approximately 2.5 km (1.6 mi) from Souillac. The falls tumble from the Savanne River from a height of about 10 m (33 ft) where constant erosion has fashioned the basalt rock into upright columns. Teens often perform dare-devil dives into the water below.

== Pairing with Souillac of France ==
A pairing exists between the village of Souillac and the town of Souillac in France (Lot Department) since 1987. This successful pairing was initiated by Armand Maudave, an inhabitant of the village of Souillac, and the Comte de Montferrand who is himself one of the descendants of the Vicomte de Souillac. People of the two localities often meet either in France or in Mauritius to share and celebrate various events. In 2007, a bust of the Vicomte de Souillac was inaugurated at the Batelage to mark the 20th anniversary of the pairing.
