= Arsenal, Mauritius =

Village in Pamplemousses District, Mauritius

Arsenal is a village located in the Pamplemousses District of northern Mauritius, approximately 15 kilometres north of Port Louis, the national capital. The area combines rural landscapes, small-scale commerce, and residential developments. Arsenal is best known for its historical origins under French colonial rule, its proximity to major urban centres, and the presence of renewable-energy infrastructure such as a large solar farm. The village also hosts a government school, Arsenal Government School, one of the country's oldest, a private secondary school and a private primary school. The Arsenal Wanderers football club is based in Arsenal.

As of the 2022 census, the village is home to 3613 people.
