= Savanne District =

Savanne Savannah
- District
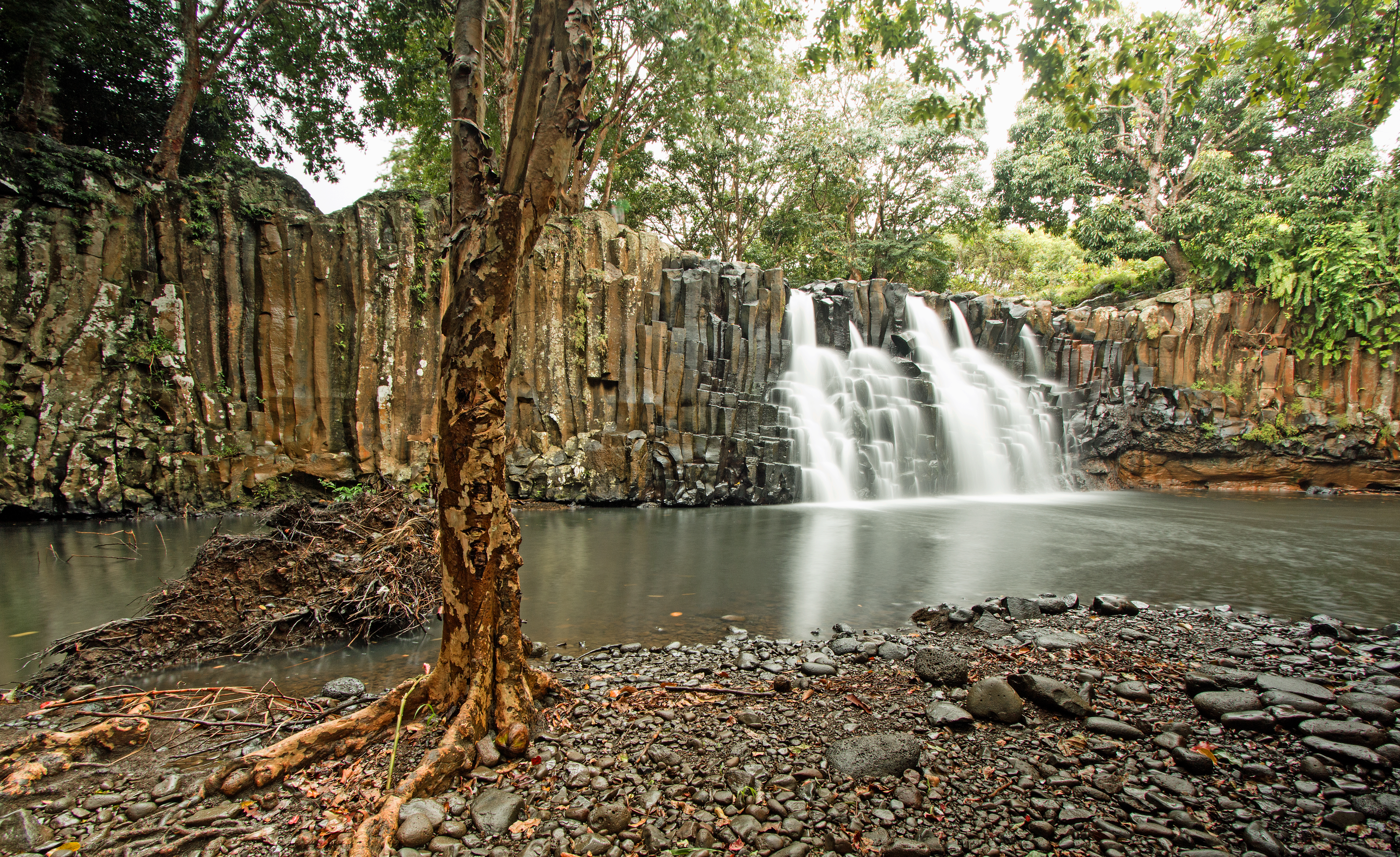
- Rochester Falls

- Map of Mauritius island with Savanne District highlighted
- Coordinates: 20°28′S 57°30′E
- Country: Mauritius

Government
  - Type: District Council
  - Chairman: Mr. Jugurnauth Sridhur
  - Vice Chairman: Mr. Chengan Joovalen

Area
  - Total: 244.8 km^{2} (94.5 sq mi)

Population (2015)
  - Total: 68,585
  - Rank: 8th in Mauritius
  - Density: 280.2/km^{2} (725.6/sq mi)
- Time zone: UTC+4 (MUT)
- ISO 3166 code: MU-SA (Savanne)

Savanne (Mauritian Creole pronunciation: [savan]) or Savannah is a district of Mauritius, situated in the south of the island. The district has an area of 244.8 square kilometres (94.5 sq mi). As of 31 December 2015, the estimated population was 68,585.

== Places ==
The Savanne District include different regions. Some regions are further divided into suburbs.

- Baie-du-Cap
- Bel-Ombre
- Bénarès
- Batimarias
- Bois-Chéri
- Britannia
- Camp Diable
- Chamouny
- Chemin-Grenier
- Grand Bois
- La Flora
- Rivière-des-Anguilles
- Rivière Du Poste
- Saint-Aubin
- Souillac
- Surinam

== Places of interest ==
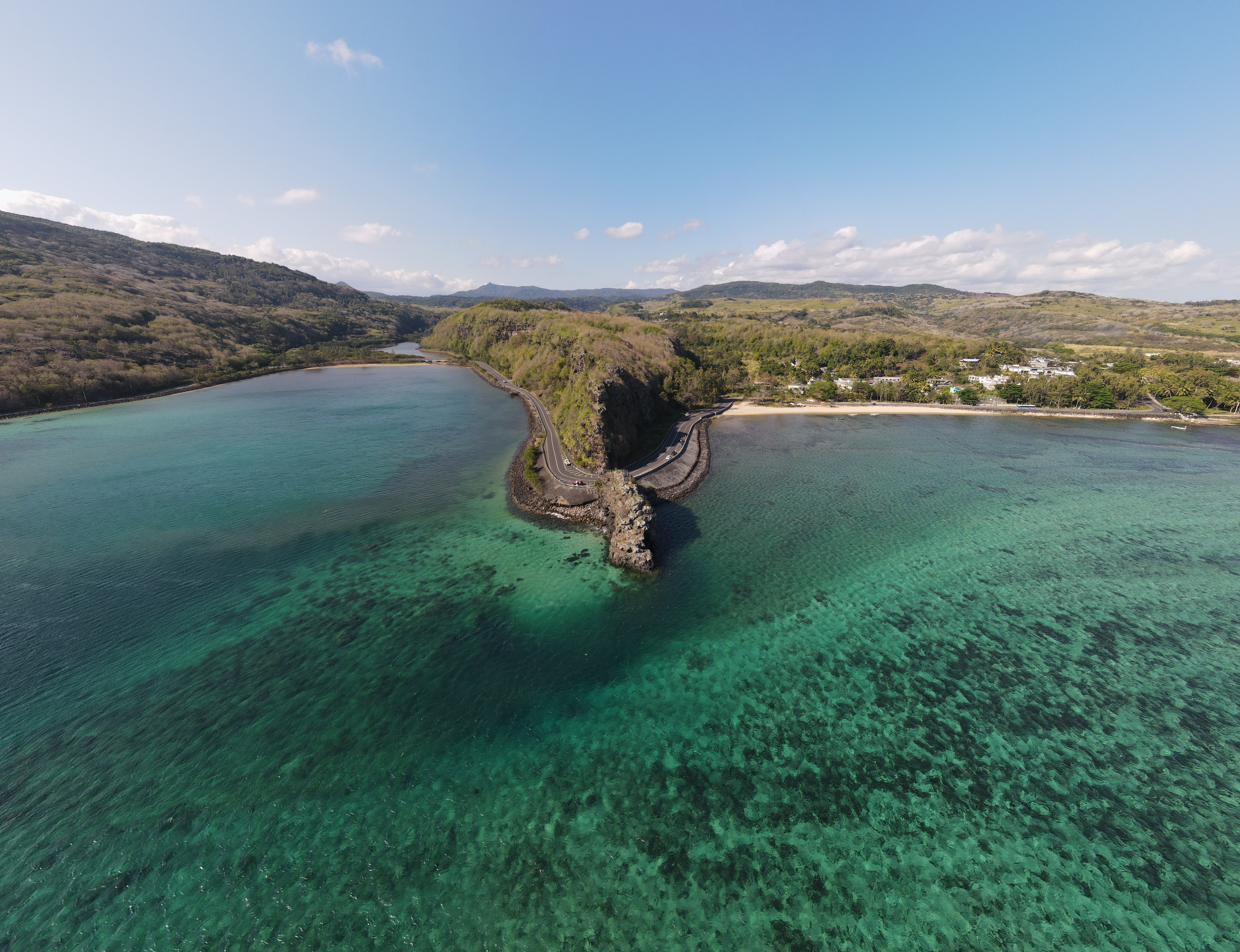
Maconde Point in Baie-du-Cap

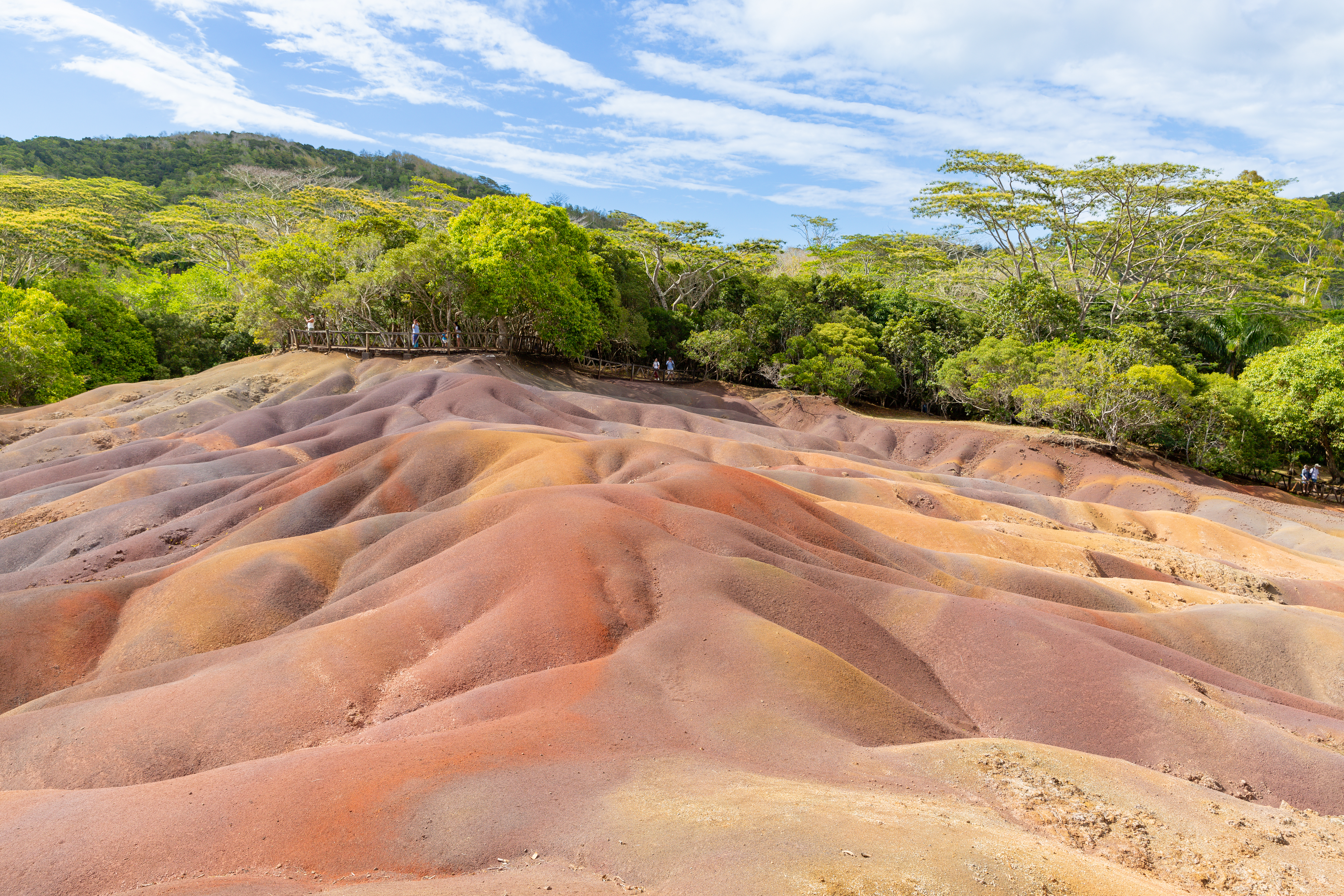
Coloured earths in Chamarel

- Ganga Talao
- Bassin Blanc
- The World of Seashells
- Bel Ombre Nature Reserve
- Chazal Ecotourism
- Domaine du Cerf d’Or
- Macondé View Point
- Vallé Advenature Park

== Savanne Mountain Range ==
The Savanne Range consists of some mountains, mainly:

=== Mont Cocotte ===
Mont Cocotte has an elevation of 779m. It is the highest peak in the Savanne Range. It also has a 4.2 mile trail that is considered moderate. It is near Alexandra Falls and Bassin Blanc.

=== Piton Savanne ===
Piton Savanne has an elevation of 704m. It also has a 3.8 mile trail that is considered moderate. It is near Valle Advenature Park.

== See also ==
- Districts of Mauritius
- List of places in Mauritius
