= Creve Coeur, Mauritius =

Coordinates: 20°11′S 57°33′E

Creve Coeur is a village in the Pamplemousses district in Mauritius.
