= Moka District =

Moka
- District
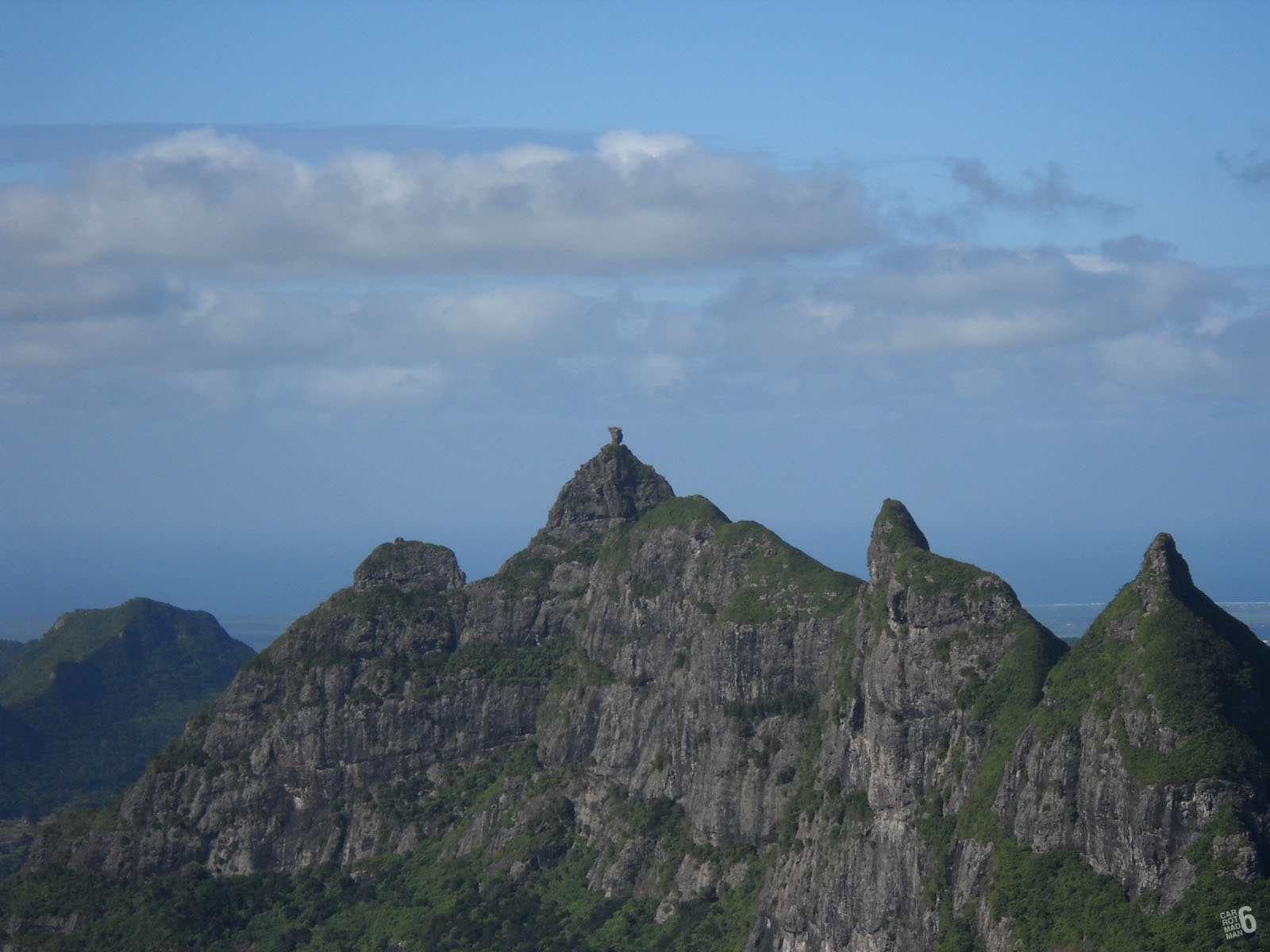
- Pieter Both of the Moka Range

- Map of Mauritius island with Moka District highlighted
- Coordinates: 20°15′S 57°34′E
- Country: Mauritius

Government
  - Type: District Council
  - Chairman: Soonarane Kumar
  - Vice Chairman: Ramduny Vageesh

Area
  - Total: 230.5 km^{2} (89.0 sq mi)

Population (2019)
  - Total: 83,664
  - Rank: 7th in Mauritius
  - Density: 363.0/km^{2} (940.1/sq mi)
- Time zone: UTC+4 (MUT)
- ISO 3166 code: MU-MO (Moka)
- Website: www.mokadc.mu

Moka (Mauritian Creole pronunciation: [moka]) is a district of Mauritius, situated in the central plateau of the island. The district has an area of 230.5 km^{2}. The population was estimated to be 83,664 at the end of 2019.

== History ==
The district of Moka was named after Moka port in Yemen. That port was the origin of the coffee plants which were imported by the French East India Company to Mauritius in the 18th century. The coffee plants were imported to the area of Mauritius that became Moka District.

== Places of interest ==
- Bagatelle Mall

== Places ==
The Moka District includes different regions; however, some regions are further divided into different suburbs. Note that the statistics do not take into account that Ripailles was created out of Nouvelle Découverte and that Pailles was absorbed by Port-Louis Municipal Council in 2011 following the new Local Government Act.

Places by population, area and density
Place	Population	Area in km²	Population density per km²
Camp Thorel	2,128	12.77	166.6
Dagotière	7,146	10.7	667.9
Dubreuil (East in Flacq District)	2,840	80	35.5
Espérance	1,884	7.64	246.6
La Laura - Malenga	1,288	4.87	264.5
L'Avenir	2,701	8.42	320.8
Melrose	1,955	4.39	445.3
Moka (West in Plaines Wilhems district)	8,846	17.44	507.2
Montagne Blanche (East in Flacq District)	9,053	19.63	461.2
Pailles	11,618	14.62	794.7
Providence	3,285	3.72	883.1
Quartier Militaire	7,046	6.89	1,022.6
Nouvelle Découverte	3,024	22.04	137.2
St Pierre	15,982	13.06	1,223.7
Verdun	2,181	4.15	525.5

== Education ==
French international schools:

- Lycée des Mascareignes - senior high (sixth form)
- École du Centre/Collège Pierre-Poivre - Primary and junior high school

== See also ==
- Districts of Mauritius
- List of places in Mauritius
