= Plaines Wilhems District =

Plaines Wilhems
- District
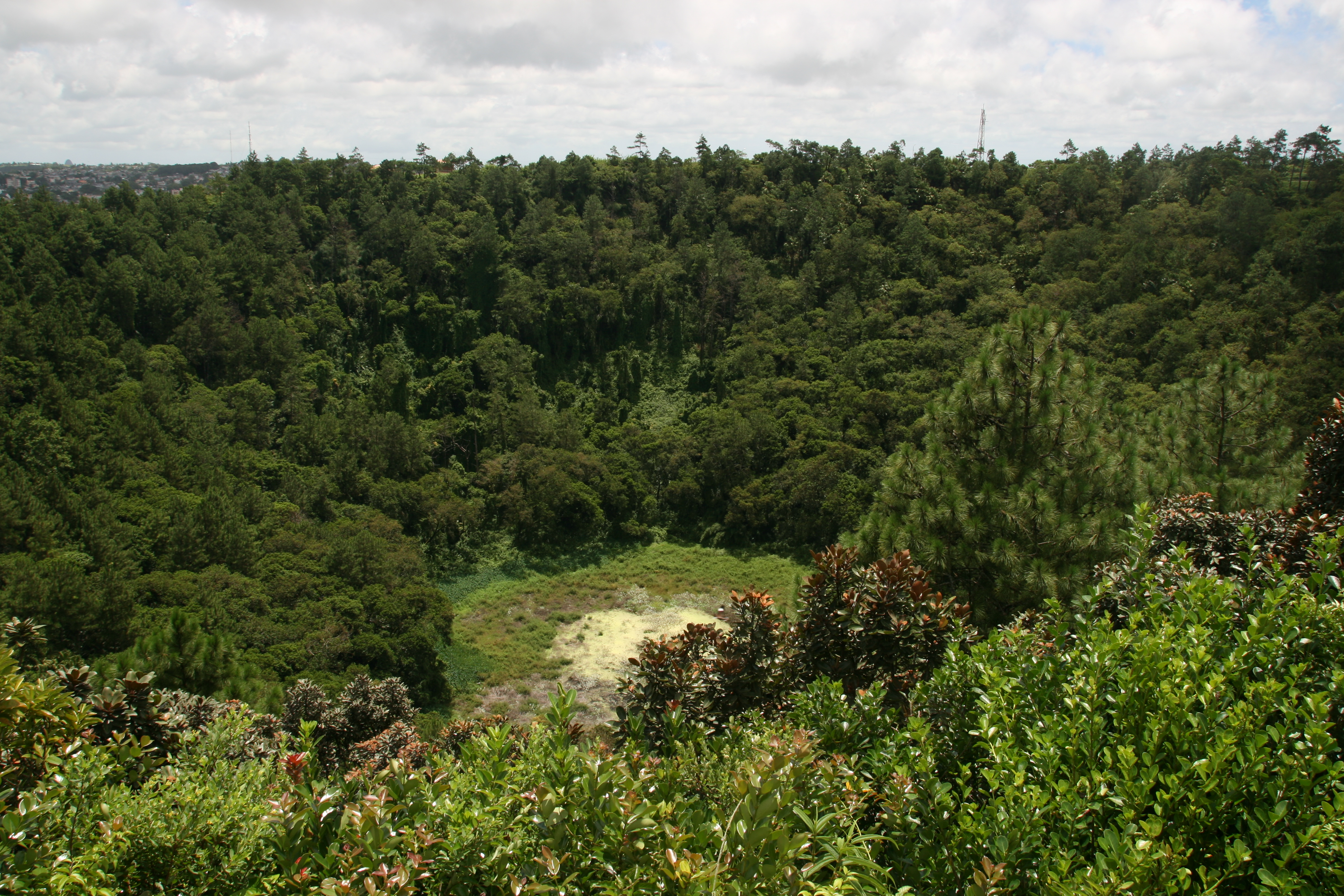
- Trou aux Cerfs volcano

- Map of Mauritius island with Plaines Wilhems District highlighted
- Coordinates: 20°18′S 57°29′E
- Country: Mauritius

Government

Area
  - Total: 203.3 km^{2} (78.5 sq mi)

Population (2019)
  - Total: 366,506
  - Rank: 1st in Mauritius
  - Density: 1,803/km^{2} (4,669/sq mi)
- Time zone: UTC+4 (MUT)
- ISO 3166 code: MU-PW (Plaines Wilhems)

Plaines Wilhems (Mauritian Creole pronunciation: [plɛn wilɛmz]) is a district of Mauritius. It is the most populous district, with an estimated population of 366,506 at the end of 2018.

The district is mainly urban; it consists of four towns, the village of Midlands and part of two other villages. The Plaines Wilhems district does not have a District Council; it has four Municipal Town Councils. The towns are Beau-Bassin Rose-Hill, Curepipe, Quatre Bornes and Vacoas-Phoenix. The villages are Midlands, Cascavelle (East – West in Rivière Noire District) and Moka (West- East in Moka District). The district was named after Wilhem Leicknig. Of Prussian origin, he settled on the island of Mauritius, then known as Isle de France, in 1721.

== Education ==
Secondary schools in the district include:

- Lycée La Bourdonnais – Curepipe
- Dr. Regis Chaperon S.S.S
- Lycée des Mascareignes – Moka
- Royal College Curepipe – Curepipe
- Queen Elizabeth College – Beau-Bassin Rose-Hill
- Collège du Saint-Esprit – Quatre-Bornes
- Doha Academy – Curepipe
- Gaetan Raynal State College – Quatre Bornes
- John Kennedy College – Beau Bassin Rose Hill
- Vacoas State Secondary School – Vacoas
- Forest Side State Secondary School – Curepipe
- Notre Dame College – Curepipe
- Eden College Boys – Quatre Bornes
- Sodnac State Secondary School – Quatre Bornes
- Loreto College Quatre Bornes – Quatre Bornes

== See also ==
- List of places in Mauritius
