= Port Louis District =

Port Louis Port-Louis
- District
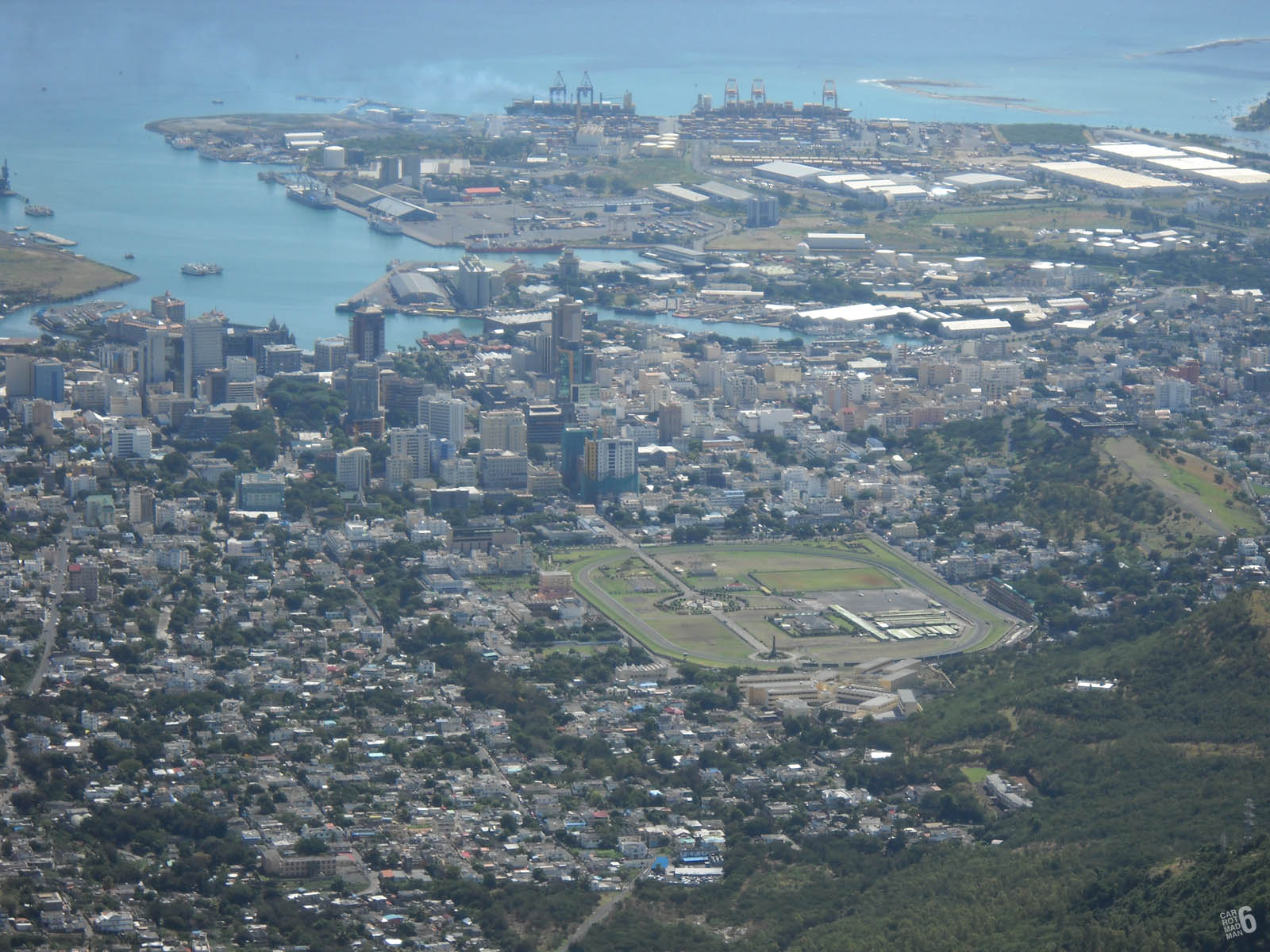
- Port Louis and its harbour

- Flag

- Map of Mauritius island with Port Louis District highlighted
- Coordinates: 20°10′S 57°31′E
- Country: Mauritius

Government
  - Type: City Council
  - Lord Mayor: Mr. Hoseenally Aslam Adam
  - Deputy Lord Mayor: Mrs. Chukowry M. Christianne Dorinne

Area
  - Total: 42.7 km^{2} (16.5 sq mi)

Population (2019)
  - Total: 118,123
  - Rank: 4th in Mauritius
  - Density: 2,770/km^{2} (7,160/sq mi)
- Time zone: UTC+4 (MUT)
- ISO 3166 code: MU-PL (Port Louis)
- Website: www.mccpl.mu

Port Louis (French: Port-Louis) is a district of Mauritius, located in the northwest of the island, it is the island nation's smallest district and has the highest population density. The district wholly encompasses Port Louis, the capital of the country. Port Louis district has an area of 42.7 km^{2} and the estimated population was 118,123 at the end of 2019.

== Places of interest ==
The district hosts the Aapravasi Ghat, a UNESCO World Heritage Site since 2006.
