= Rivière du Rempart District =

Rivière du Rempart
- District
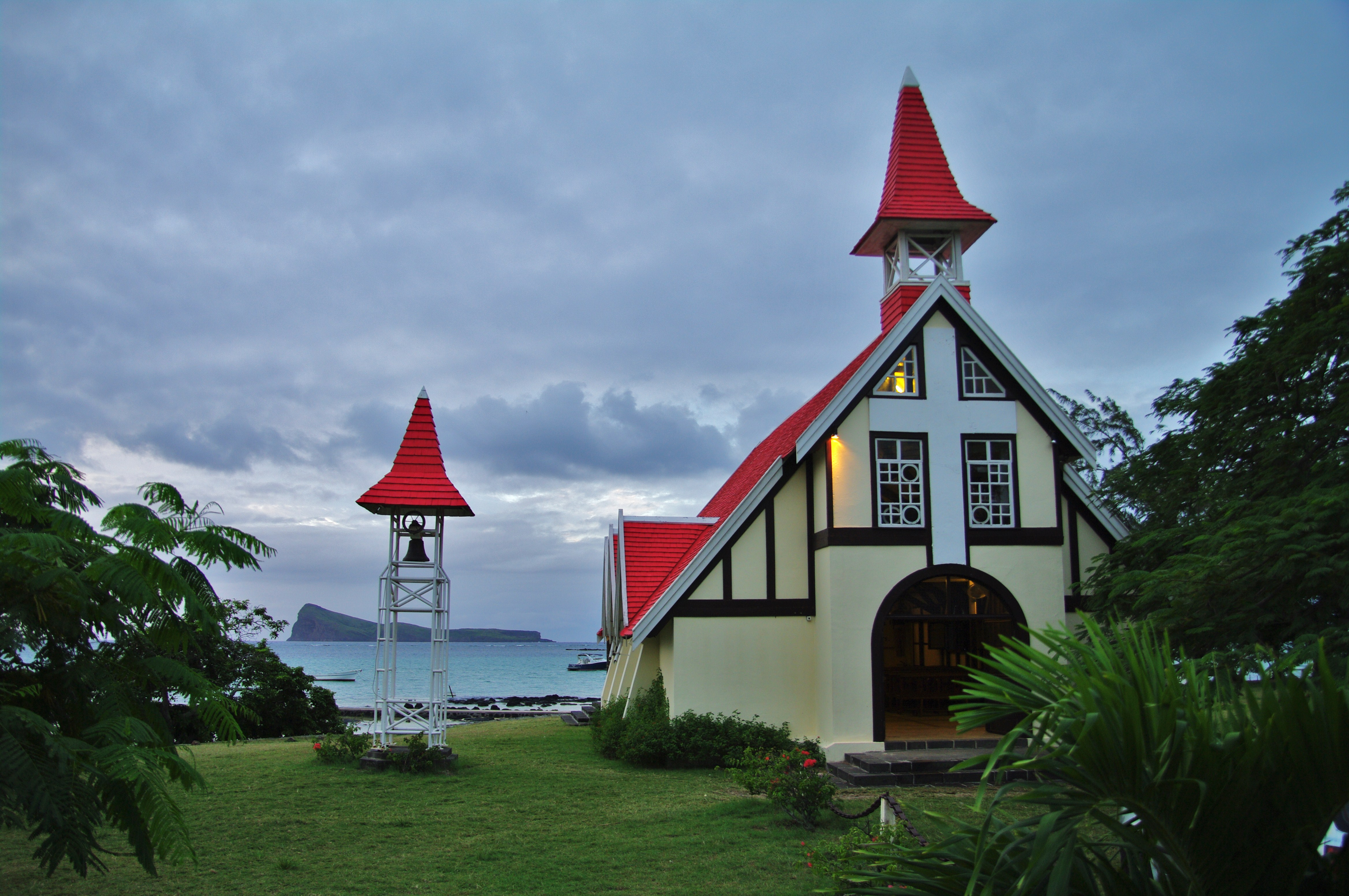
- Cap Malheureux

- Map of Mauritius island with Rivière du Rempart District highlighted
- Coordinates: 20°03′S 57°38′E
- Country: Mauritius

Government
  - Type: District Council
  - Chairman: Mr. Ellayah Prembhoodas
  - Vice Chairman: Mr. Koobarawa Deokumar

Area
  - Total: 147.6 km^{2} (57.0 sq mi)

Population (2015)
  - Total: 108,005
  - Rank: 6th in Mauritius
  - Density: 731.7/km^{2} (1,895/sq mi)
- Time zone: UTC+4 (MUT)
- ISO 3166 code: MU-RR (Rivière du Rempart)

Rivière du Rempart (Mauritian Creole pronunciation: [ʁivjɛː dʒi ʁɑ̃pɑː]) is a district of Mauritius, located in the north-east of the island. It has an area of 147.6 km^{2} and an estimated population of 108,005, as of 31 December 2015.

== Places ==
The Rivière du Rempart District includes different regions; however, some regions are further divided into different suburbs.

- Amaury (Southern part in Flacq district)
- Amitié-Gokhoola (Western part in Pamplemousses district)
- Belle Vue Maurel
  - Barlow
- Brisée-Verdière (Southern part in Flacq district)
- Cap Malheureux
- Cottage
- Espérance Trébuchet
- Goodlands
- Grand Baie (Western part in Pamplemousses district)
- Grand-Gaube
- Le Vale
  - Lower Vale
  - Upper Vale
- Mapou (Southern part in Pamplemousses district)
- Panchavati
- Petit Raffray
- Piton (Western part in Pamplemousses district)
- Plaines des Roches (Southern part in Flacq district)
- Pointe de Lascars
- Poudre d'Or
- Poudre d'Or Hamlet
- Rivière-du-Rempart
- Roche-Terre
- Roches-Noires (Southern part in Flacq district)
- Villebague (Western part in Pamplemousses district and Southern part in Flacq district)
- Forbach

== Education ==
In a 2021 article on education reform for the newspaper Le Mauricien, educator and PTr member Mahend Gungapersad questioned why colleges in rural districts like Rivière du Rempart were not added to the government's list of 12 colleges to be converted into academies.

The district is home to HEI Schools Mauritius, an HEI School for ages 1 to 6, located in Forbach, Rivière du Rempart.

List of secondary schools in Rivière du Rempart

- Northfields International High School, Mapou. Private school, part of the Inspired Education Group.
- Ramsoondur Prayag State Secondary School, Rivière du Rempart
- Simadree Virasawmy State Secondary School, Rivière du Rempart
- Universal College, Rivière du Rempart. Private school.
- Ideal College, Rivière du Rempart
- Beekrumsing Ramlallah State Secondary School, Mapou
- Piton State College, Piton, founded in 2002
- Sharma Jugdambi State Secondary School, Goodlands
- Goodlands State Secondary School (Boys), Goodlands
- Friendship College (Boys and Girls), Goodlands
- Adolphe de Plevitz State Secondary School, Grand Bay. Founded in 2003 as "The Royal College".
- MITD Centre, Piton
- MITD Centre, Goodlands

Sharma Jugdambi school launched an "Indian Corner" in 2025 to boost reading and literacy in its young people, and strengthen ties between Mauritius and India. The initiative featured over 500 books from and about India. The project was initiated by Mahend Gungapersad as minister of education and human resources, and Anurag Srivastava as High Commissioner of India.

The Universal college in Rivière du Rempart is a private college founded in 1961, and as of 2015 hosted a variety of classes, from yoga and music to science and business, as well as extracurricular activities including a communal and vegetable garden, reflecting the local community's history of generational farming and tending lands. It was cited in 2018 among Mauritian private colleges with declining enrollments, specifically those where parents wanted better education for their children. As part of a ceremony for the college's 60th anniversary in 2021, then-president of Mauritius Prithvirajsing Roopun visited the establishment to praise its students as well as, with headmistress Anjanee Bolakee-Bhowon, commend the hard work of the faculty members.

== See also ==
- Districts of Mauritius
- List of places in Mauritius
