= Statistics Mauritius =

Government statistical agency of Mauritius

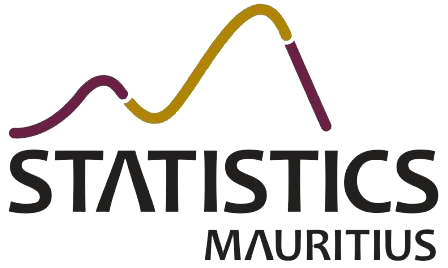

Agency overview
- Formed: July 1945
- Jurisdiction: Government of Mauritius
- Headquarters: Port Louis, Mauritius
- Employees: 250
- Agency executive: Harish Bundhoo, Director
- Parent department: Ministry of Finance and Economic Development
- Website: statsmauritius.govmu.org

Statistics Mauritius, formerly known as the Central Statistics Office (CSO) until 2000, is the national statistical agency of Mauritius. It operates under the aegis of the Ministry of Finance and Economic Development and is responsible for all statistical activities except for fisheries and health statistics which fall under the responsibility of the respective ministry.

According to the Statistics Act No. 38 of 2000, "Statistics Mauritius shall constitute the central statistical authority and depository of all officials statistics produced in Mauritius and as such, shall collect, compile, analyse and disseminate accurate, relevant, timely and high quality statistics and related information on social, demographic, economic and financial activities to serve the needs of public and private users." The headquarters of the statistics office is located in Port Louis.

== See also ==
- List of national and international statistical services
