= Districts of Mauritius =

Second-level administrative divisions of Mauritius

The Districts of the Republic of Mauritius are the second-level administrative divisions after the Outer Islands of Mauritius.

== Mauritius Island ==

Mauritius Island is divided into nine districts which consist of one city, four towns, and 130 villages. Its capital is Port Louis.

The Plaines Wilhems District consists mainly of four towns: Beau Bassin-Rose Hill, Curepipe, Quatre Bornes, and Vacoas-Phoenix. The other districts consist of different villages, some of which are further divided into suburbs. As of 31 December 2012, the urban population stood at 536,086 and the rural population was 718,925.

Districts	Area km^{2}	Population ('000, 2021)
Flacq	297.9	138.7
Grand Port	260.3	112.6
Moka	230.5	83.8
Pamplemousses	178.7	142.4
Plaines Wilhems	203.3	365.4
Port Louis	42.7	117.5
Rivière du Rempart	147.6	108.1
Rivière Noire	259	85.2
Savanne	244.8	68.2
Total	1864.8	1 266.1

== Autonomous region and Villages ==
Rodrigues used to be the tenth district of Mauritius, until the island gained autonomy in 2002. Its capital is Port Mathurin.

Autonomous region	Area km^{2}	Population (2025)
Rodrigues	108	44.3k

== Dependencies of Mauritius ==
1. Agaléga.
2. Saint Brandon
3. Chagos Archipelago
4. Tromelin Island

The capital of Agaléga is Vingt-Cinq.

Saint Brandon is sparsely populated, its main settlement is Île Raphael (pop. 40).

Chagos Archipelago is an overseas British territory disputed with Mauritius. Its capital is Diego Garcia (British Indian Ocean Territory)

Tromelin Island has an ongoing dispute with the French Southern and Antarctic Lands part of France. Debated on whether part of Mauritius or not.

== See also ==
- ISO 3166-2:MU
- List of places in Mauritius
- Outer Islands of Mauritius
