= History of rail transport in Mauritius =

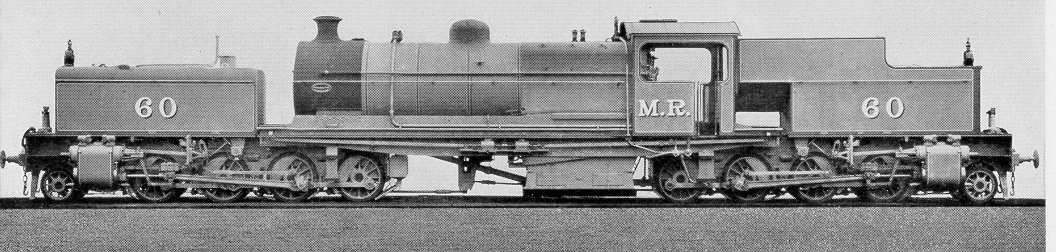
Beyer, Peacock & Company works photo of Mauritius Railway Garratt locomotive no 60, taken in 1927

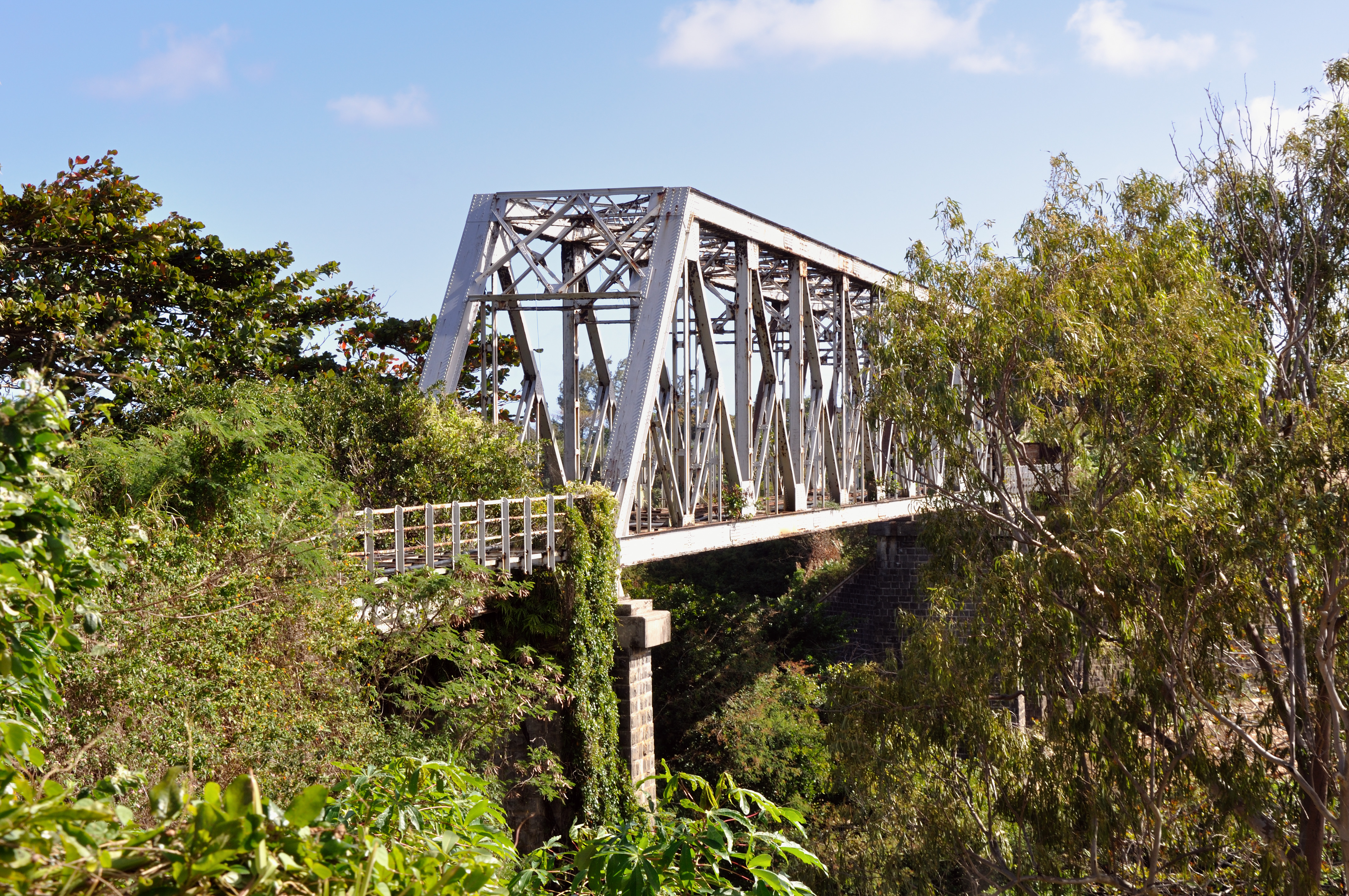
Former railway bridge near L'Escalier, 2009

The history of rail transport in Mauritius began in the 1860s. The Mauritian rail network was quickly built and it soon provided service to most of the island. It was a key factor in the social-economic development of Mauritius during its period of operation. However, due to persistent unprofitability from 1948 to 1953, it was closed in 1964. In 2019, the Metro Express light rail system opened, bringing rail passenger traffic back to Mauritius.

== Beginnings ==
Mauritius was developing rapidly in the 1860s. To progress further, it needed to modernize its transportation system. As such, introduction of a railway network was essential for the future development of the island. With Port Louis as hub, the railway network quickly developed and was soon covering most of the island.

The first line opened in 1864; it was named the North line. The second line, the Midlands line, started functioning in 1865. With developing urbanisation, secondary lines were gradually extended. All of these lines were 4 ft 8 1/2 in (1,435 mm) standard gauge.

== Network ==
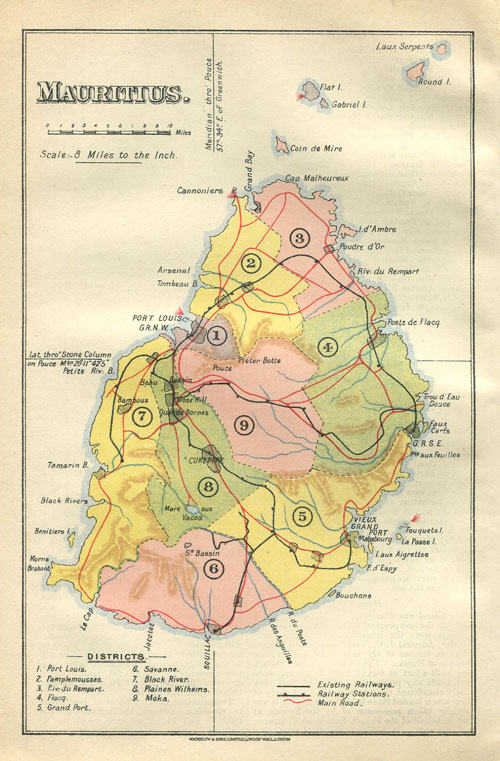
Waterlow and Sons map of Mauritius, 1910, showing railway lines in black

=== Main lines ===
The North line covered 50 km (31 mi) and started operation on 23 May 1864. It passed through the districts of Pamplemousses, Rivière du Rempart and Flacq, to end at the station of Grand River South East.

The Midlands line covered 56 km (35 mi). It connected Port Louis to Mahébourg, and opened on 22 October 1865. This line contributed to the development of urban agglomerations by passing through the secondary stations of Beau Bassin, Rose Hill, Quatre Bornes, Phoenix, Vacoas, Curepipe and Rose-Belle.

=== Secondary lines ===
As the rural areas developed, the railway network was gradually extended. There were four secondary lines:

- The Moka-Flacq line, which opened on 11 December 1876. It joined the Midlands line at Rose Hill, and ran through Plaines Wilhems, Moka and Flacq to Rivière Sèche, where it formed a junction with the North line; it was 42 km (26 mi) long.
- The Savanne branch joined the Midlands line at Rose Belle and ran through the Savanne District to Souillac, measuring 18 km (11 mi).
- The Black-River line, 21 km (13 mi) long, ran from Port Louis to Tamarin; it became operational on 27 August 1904.
- The Long Mountain branch, which was 6.5 km (4 mi) long, opened on 21 September 1903.

=== Rolling stock ===
At its apogee, the Mauritius Government Railways had a fleet of 52 steam locomotives, including three Garratts, numbers 60 to 62, two 500 hp (370 kW) diesel-hydraulic locomotives ("Jessop"), together with nearly 200 passenger coaches and 750 goods wagons. Mauritian rail vehicles and operating practices were predominantly British in style.

=== Sugar mill lines ===
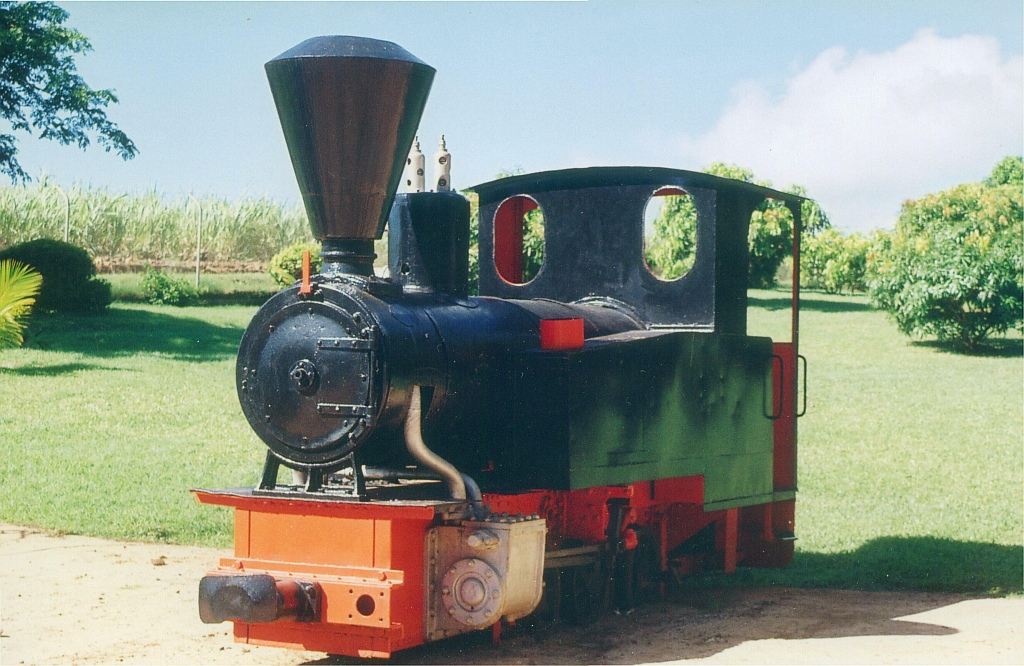
A restored narrow-gauge locomotive that once worked sugar cane trains. Casela Bird Park, Cascavelle.

Mauritius also once had a number of narrow gauge industrial railway lines, each connecting a sugar mill with nearby sugar cane plantations. Some of the steam locomotives used on these lines are now preserved, mostly at various sugar mills around Mauritius.

== Role of railway networks in the development of the island ==
The maximum length of the Mauritian railway network was 250 km (155 mi). The railways contributed, to a great extent, to the socio-economic development of the island from the late 19th century to the middle 20th century.

Secondary lines were crucial in boosting development in some of the rural villages, such as in Black River, where plantations of tobacco, sugar cane and aloe were the main economic activities; as such the railway provided an opportunity of commercial exchange for the rural areas. Goods and crops, mainly sugar cane, were carried with efficacy and in increasing quantity. From 1880 to 1910, approximately 100,000 tons of sugar cane were carried by trains. This changed with the introduction of lorries in 1920.

The railway network also contributed to the field of education, as it provided transport to the major towns of the island, where the schools were found. The railway had a great impact on the lifestyle of the population; everybody traveled by train. From the richest to the poorest, the railway provided a relatively fast and affordable way of travelling between the different towns of the island. As a result, towns were getting ‘closer’ to each other; facilitating commercial exchanges. The development of the railway network also led to the creation of new agglomerations: future towns, near the stations.

While some villages progressed with the introduction of railways, the railway was also, at a certain point, a deterrent for the progress of villages such as Port Louis, which saw a major exile of its population towards Curepipe and Rose Hill: this was because the railways allowed the population to leave the capital, which was considered an insalubrious place due to the raging fever epidemic that was killing thousands of people in the capital and its neighborhoods during 1866–1968.

=== Accidents ===
The most serious accident to occur on the network was on 22 February 1894 at Pailles. Partly caused by a storm, six passenger carriages ended up in the Saint Louis river, causing the deaths of 40 passengers and injuring many others.

== Closure ==
The railway network continued its operation, well after World War II. At the same time, the road networks were developing quickly and the number of road vehicles doubled in the after-war period. Faced with the railway's persistent deficit, the colonial authority decided to close the railways.

The last passenger train made its journey on 31 March 1956, between Port-Louis and Curepipe. Transport of sugar, heavy goods and general merchandise continued till 1964. The railway network was then dismantled and sold as scrap metal. Some of the rolling stock was sold as scrap to Bethlehem Steel of South Africa and some of the rail went to India.

== Reintroduction ==
In 2017, construction of a 26 km (16 mi) light rail line between Port Louis and Curepipe commenced. The newly constructed line partly follows the route of the former Midlands line (between Port Louis and Quatre Bornes). Operations on the northern section started in December 2019, the full line originally was scheduled to open in 2021; later, the opening date was pushed back to December 2022. A connection between Rose Hill and Réduit, following the route of the old Moka-Flacq line, is under construction as well.

== See also ==
- History of rail transport
- Rail transport in Mauritius
- Transport in Mauritius
