= Grand River, Mauritius =

Coordinates: 20°17′00″S 57°46′00″E

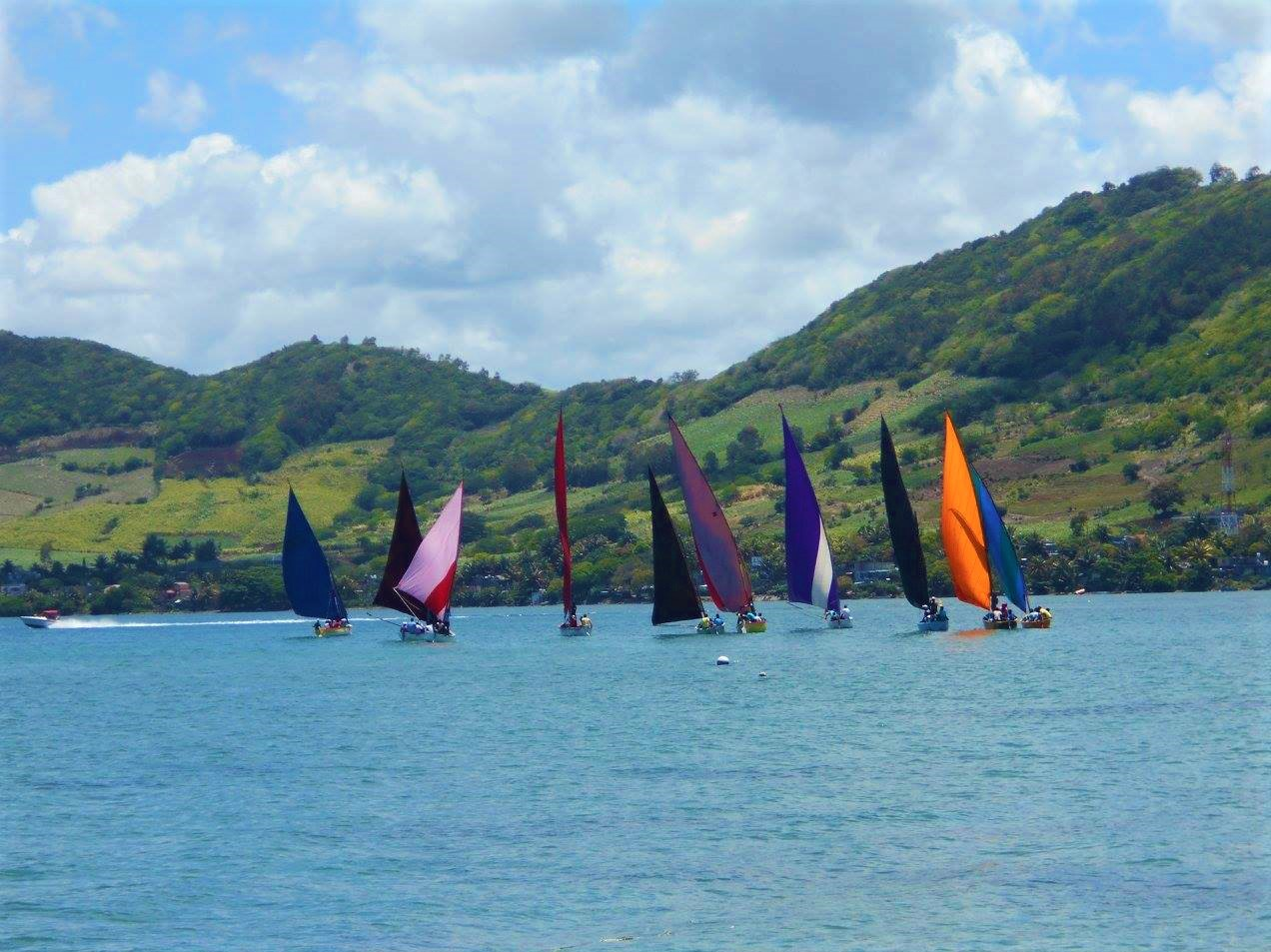
Sailboats in Grand River

Grand River South East (GRSE) is a historic village in the southeast of Mauritius in the Indian Ocean. It was named Groote River (Great River) by the Dutch. In the 17th century, GRSE was used for stocking and shipping ebony wood under the Dutch Occupation. The inhabitants of Grand River South East live mostly from fishing. The village has about 1500 households. It also has an active small planters community. The other economic operators are the Deep River Beau Champ Sugar Estates and a hotel known as Laguna Beach. Village life is structured through the Village Council and a number of local organisations exist including those focusing on: women, youth, the aging and fishermen.

At the Grand River South East mouth, where the river's current meets the ocean's tide, you can see some impressive ravines and a spectacular waterfall. The waterfall at GRSE is one of the east coast's most popular attractions after Île aux Cerfs. Every day there are trips from the villages of Trou d’Eau Douce and GRSE to the river and the waterfall.

== Transport ==
The north line covered 50 kilometres and started operation on 23 May 1864. It passed through the districts of Pamplemousses, Rivière Du Rempart and Flacq, to end at the station of Grand River South East.

Grand River was connected to the capital of Port Louis by two railways, one following the coast, and one going over mountains on an inland route.

== See also ==
- Railway stations in Mauritius
