= Rail transport in Mauritius =

A railway system existed in Mauritius from the 1860s until 1964. In 1956 the decision was made to close the railway due to unprofitability. At this time, Mauritius Government Railways had 146 km (91 mi) of 1,435 mm (4 ft 8 1/2 in) (standard gauge) track and 47 locomotives. Freight transport continued until 1964 when the railway was scrapped.

From 1964 to 2020, there were no operational long-distance railways in Mauritius. With increasing road traffic congestion, plans surfaced in 2009 for a metro system. The first stage of Metro Express opened in 2020.

== Light rail system ==
Initial plans suggested a 24.9 km line which would relieve pressure on busy roads; it would be supported by a feeder network of buses.

The first line would go from the capital at Port Louis to Curepipe, mostly following the trackbed of a former Government railway closed in the 1960s.

On 2 August 2017 it was announced that Larsen & Toubro would be the contractor responsible for constructing the metro network.

The first stage, Port Louis to Rose Hill Central, was opened on 10 January 2020. An extension by two stops to Quatre Bornes was opened on 20 June 2021. The second stage, to Curepipe, and the third stage, to Réduit, were completed in October 2022.

== See also ==
- Economy of Mauritius
- History of rail transport in Mauritius
- Railway stations in Mauritius
- Transport in Mauritius
