= Quatre Cocos =

- Village
- Location within Mauritius
- Coordinates: 20°12′25″S 57°46′10″E
- Country: Mauritius
- Districts: Flacq

Government
- Elevation: 39 m (128 ft)

Population (2006)
  - Total: 5,724
- Time zone: UTC+4 (MUT)
- Area code: 230
- ISO 3166 code: MU

Quatre Cocos is a village in the District of Flacq in the eastern part of the island of Mauritius, the main island of the Republic of Mauritius. It is located at -20.2078 [latitude in decimal degrees], 57.7625 [longitude in decimal degrees] and at an average elevation/altitude of meters of 39 metres above sea level.
