= Transport in Mauritius =

A map of Mauritius with major roadways in red

Transportation in Mauritius is characterized by the network of roadways, ports, and airports. The island was originally only accessible by boat until 1922, when the first flight landed in Mauritius.

== Rail transport ==
A public and industrial railway system existed from the 1860s to the 1960s. Due to persistent unprofitability from 1948 to 1953, it was finally closed in 1964. From 1964 to 2020, there were no railways in Mauritius.

To cope with increasing road traffic congestion, a light rail system, Metro Express, was built between Curepipe and Port Louis. The project consisted of a number of phases; the first phase, Port Louis to Rose Hill, went operational in January 2020. When completed, the system covered a distance of some 25 km, with some 19 stations, many located in town centres along the route with existing transport terminals. The end-to-end journey time would be approximately 41 minutes and coaches would be air-conditioned. Headways would vary by time of day, but are expected to be of the order of 6 minutes in peak periods. Access to stations would be by an integrated system of comfortable and reliable feeder buses. A 3.4-km branch with two stations will be built as well.

== Motorized transport ==
=== History ===
At the beginning of 1860, the transport of passengers and goods was undertaken by about 2,000 horses, 4,000 donkeys and 4,500 carriages and carts. With the advent of the railways, and later of motorized transport, animal based transport systems declined on the island.

In January 1901, the first two-seater car, imported by Goupilles & Cies, was disembarked. In October of that same year, the Union Regnard sugar estate (Now F.U.E.L) received the first motorized truck of British origin, capable of transporting up to 5 tons.

In 1930, the island had 3,016 vehicles: around 2,401 private cars, 300 taxis, 303 trucks, 92 buses and 220 motorcycles. In 1950, vehicles numbered in the 5,161 and went up to 13,291 in 1960 with the decline of the railways. In 1970, the number of vehicles nearly doubled, going to 25,389 motorised vehicles. This included 12,546 cars, 4,171 trucks, 722 buses and 5,383 motorcycles. Public transport, in the form of buses, grew in line with the demographic and economic growth of the island; buses numbered 186 in 1950, 488 in 1960, 722 in 1970 and 1,490 in 1980.

As of 2019, 580,629 vehicles were registered on the island. Of these, 299,998 were cars and dual-purpose vehicles (cars capable of carrying a certain load of goods), and 216,863 were motorcycles and autocycles (light motorcycles).

=== National Land Transport Authority ===
The National Land Transport Authority (NTLA) is the governmental department established under the Road Traffic Act in 1980 whose main responsibility is the regulation and control of road transport in Mauritius and Rodrigues. It falls under the responsibility of the Ministry of Public Infrastructure, Land Transport and Shipping. The responsibility for the administration of the NTLA rests with the Road Transport Commissioner.

The NTLAA also has a board constituted under section 73 of the Road Traffic Act. The Board consists of a chairman appointed by the Minister and 10 other members. The board is responsible to hear and decide on the applications for licenses for the transport of goods and passengers; and disciplinary proceedings instituted against transport operators, drivers, and conductors of public service vehicles for offences committed under the Act.

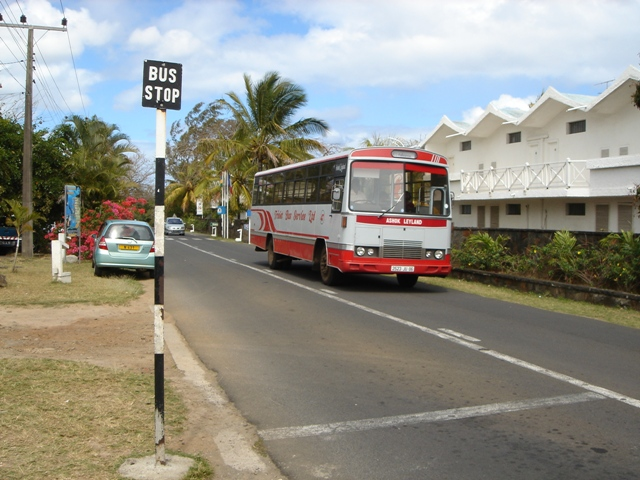
A public bus in Mauritius

The other responsibilities of this governmental department are:

- registration and transfer of ownership of motor vehicles;
- licensing of public service vehicles and goods vehicles as well as petrol service stations;
- collection of road tax and other licence fees;
- examination of motor vehicles as to their road-worthiness;
- licensing of bus conductors;
- enforcement of road transport legislation and monitoring the level of service of public transport;
- enforcement of parking regulations;
- keeping statistics relating to motor vehicles; and
- planning of new transport services.

=== Road network ===
As of 2019, there are 2,772 kilometres (1,722 mi) of roads in Mauritius, of which 1,140 kilometres (710 mi) are main roads, 913 kilometres (567 mi) are secondary roads, 104 kilometres (65 mi) are motorways and the remaining 615 kilometres (382 mi) are made up of other types of roads. The percentage of paved roads is 98%. The number of vehicles per kilometre of road is 209.

The motorway network includes three main motorways:

- M1 (Port Louis – Plaisance Dual Carriageway) goes from Port Louis to the International airport, also connecting Moka, Beau Bassin-Rose Hill, Quatre Bornes, Vacoas-Phoenix and Curepipe. Its length is 47 kilometres (29 mi) and it is the most important road in the country.
- M2 (Port Louis – Sottise Dual Carriageway) goes from Port Louis to Grand-Baie in the North, it also connects Pamplemousses. Its length is 23 kilometres (14 mi).
- M3 (Terre Rouge – Verdun – Trianon Link Road and Bagatelle – Valentina Link Road) bypasses Port Louis.
- M4 (Airport – Bel Air – Point Blanc – Forbach) is in early stages of contracting.

=== Bus network ===
Mauritius has a widespread bus network with around 220 bus lines and roughly 900 bus stops. They are operated by major companies (Mauritius Bus Transport, National Transport Corporation (NTC), United Bus Service (UBS)), as well as smaller companies (Rose Hill Transport (RHT), Triolet Bus Service (TBS) and others) and various individual operators that are organized in regional Bus Owners Co-operative Societies (BOCS). The bus prices are regulated by the Government of Mauritius. However, there is no such thing as an operator independent ticket which could be used across the island.

=== Bus routes ===
The following is a list of the bus routes operated in Mauritius:

Route number	Origin	Destination	Via:	Operator:
1	Port Louis/Victoria	Rose Hill	La Butte, Plaine Lauzun, GRNW, Coromandel, Beau Bassin	RHT/Rose Hill Transport
1A	Port Louis/Victoria	St Patrick	La Butte, Plaine Lauzun, GRNW, Coromandel, Barkly, Mont Roches, Roches Brunes, Stanley, Boundary	RHT/Rose Hill Transport
1B	Port Louis/Victoria	Rose Hill	La Butte, Plaine Lauzun, GRNW, Coromandel, Beau Bassin, Vandermeersch	RHT/Rose Hill Transport
1C	Port Louis/Victoria	St Patrick	La Butte, Plaine Lauzun, GRNW, Coromandel, Beau Bassin, Rose Hill	RHT/Rose Hill Transport
2	Port Louis/Victoria	Curepipe/North	La Butte, Plaine Lauzun, GRNW, Coromandel, Beau Bassin, Rose Hill, Belle Rose, Shoprite, Jumbo, Phoenix, St Paul, Castel, Eau Coulee	UBS/United Bus Service
2A	Port Louis/Victoria	Forest Side(UBS Depot)	La Butte, Plaine Lauzun, GRNW, Coromandel, Beau Bassin, Rose Hill, Belle Rose, Shoprite, Jumbo, Phoenix, St Paul, Castel, Eau Coulee, Curepipe/North, Morcellement Piat	UBS/United Bus Service
3	Port Louis/Victoria	Vacoas	La Butte, Plaine Lauzun, GRNW, Coromandel, Beau Bassin, Rose Hill, Belle Rose, St Jean, Quatre Bornes, La Louise, Candos, Bonne Terre, La Caverne	NTC/National Transport Corporation
3A	Port Louis/Victoria	Phoenix	La Butte, Plaine Lauzun, GRNW, Coromandel, Beau Bassin, Rose Hill, Belle Rose, St Jean, Quatre Bornes, La Louise, Candos, Bonne Terre, La Caverne, Vacoas, Palmerstone	NTC/National Transport Corporation
3B	Port Louis/Victoria	Bord Cascades/Henrietta	La Butte, Plaine Lauzun, GRNW, Coromandel, Beau Bassin, Rose Hill, Belle Rose, St Jean, Quatre Bornes, La Louise, Candos, Bonne Terre, La Caverne, Quinze Cantons, Diolle, Glen Park	NTC/National Transport Corporation
3C	Port Louis/Victoria	Bassin	La Butte, Plaine Lauzun, GRNW, Coromandel, Beau Bassin, Rose Hill, Belle Rose, St Jean, Quatre Bornes, La Louise	NTC/National Transport Corporation
3D	Port Louis/Victoria	La Marie	La Butte, Plaine Lauzun, GRNW, Coromandel, Beau Bassin, Rose Hill, Belle Rose, St Jean, Quatre Bornes, La Louise, Candos, Bonne Terre, La Caverne, Quinze Cantons, Diolle, Glen Park, Morcellement Pousson	NTC/National Transport Corporation
3E	Vacoas	Rose Hill	La Caverne, Bonne Terre, Candos, La Louise, Quatre Bornes, St Jean, Belle Rose	NTC/National Transport Corporation
4	Curepipe/North	Quatre Bornes	Eau Coulee, Castel, St Paul, Clarisse, Vacoas, La Caverne, Bonne Terre, Candos, La Louise	NTC
4A	Curepipe/North	Quatre Bornes	Floreal, Cite Mangalkhan, Riverwalk, Vacoas, La Caverne, Bonne Terre, Candos, La Louise	NTC
5	Quatre Bornes	Baie du Cap	La Louise, Palma, Beau Songes, Geoffroy, Bambous, Cascavelle Mall, Casela, Tamarin, La Preneuse, Riviere Noire, Case Noyale, La Gaulette, Coteau Raffin, Le Morne, La Prairie, Maconde	Individual Operators
6	Curepipe/South	Riviere des Galets	Forest Side, Seizieme Mille, Nouvelle France, Pont Colville, Beau Climat, La Flora, Riviere Dragon, Britannia, Tyack, Riviere des Anguilles, Union Ducray, St Aubin, Souillac, Surinam, Belle Vue, Chemin Grenier	NTC
6A	Curepipe/South	Chamouny	Forest Side, Seizieme Mille, Nouvelle France, Pont Colville, Beau Climat, La Flora, Riviere Dragon, Britannia, Tyack, Riviere des Anguilles, Union Ducray, St Aubin, Souillac, Surinam, Belle Vue, Chemin Grenier	NTC
7	Riviere des Galets	Rose Belle	Chemin Grenier, Belle Vue, Surinam, Souillac, St Aubin, Union Ducray, Riviere des Anguilles, Tyack, Britannia, Riviere Dragon, La Flora, Beau Climat, Wireless Road, Balisson	NTC
8	Souillac	Choisy	Surinam, Belle Vue, Chemin Grenier, Riviere des Galets, Beau Champ, Bel Ombre, St Martin, Baie du Cap	NTC
9	Curepipe/South	Mahebourg	Forest Side, Seizieme Mille, Nouvelle France, Union Park, Balisson, Rose Belle, JN Hospital, New Grove, Mare d'Albert, Plaine Magnien, SSR International Airport, Beau Vallon	Individual Operators
10	Riviere des Galets	Mahebourg	Chemin Grenier, Belle Vue, Surinam, Souillac, Union Ducray, St Aubin, Riviere des Anguilles, Batimarais, Benares, Camp Diable, La Sourdine, L'Escalier, Plein Bois, Trois Boutiques, Union Vale, Plaine Magnien, SSR International Airport, Beau Vallon	Individual Operators
10A	Curepipe/South	L'Escalier	Forest Side, Seizieme Mille, Nouvelle France, Union Park, Balisson, Rose Belle, JN Hospital, New Grove, Mare d'Albert, Plaine Magnien, Union Vale, Trois Boutiques, Plein Bois	Individual Operators/UBS
11	Mahebourg	St Hubert	Ville Noire, Grand Bel Air, Riche en Eau, St Hilaire, Cent Gaulettes	Individual Operators
12	Port Louis/Victoria	Sebastopol	La Butte, Bell Village, Camp Chapelon, Pailles, Soreze, Montagne Ory, Moka Hospital, Bois Cheri, Petit Verger, Verdun, Alma, Quartier Militaire, Providence, Melrose, Montagne Blanche, Lesur	Individual Operators
13	Rose Hill	St Pierre	Ebene Cybercity, Reduit, MGI, Moka Hospital, Bois Cheri, Petit Verger	Individual Operators
13A	Rose Hill	Nouvelle Decouverte/Eau Bouille	Ebene Cybercity, Reduit, MGI, Helvetia, Gentilly, St Pierre, L'Avenir, Beau Bois, Ripailles	Individual Operators
13D	Rose Hill	La Laura	Ebene Cybercity, Reduit, MGI, Helvetia, Gentilly, St Pierre, L'Avenir	Individual Operators
14	Curepipe/South	Rose Belle	Forest Side, Seizieme Mille, Coriolis, Midlands, Bananes, Cluny, Cite Beemanique, Union Park, Balisson, JN Hospital	NTC
15	Rose Hill	Central Flacq	Ebene Cybercity, Reduit, MGI, Helvetia, Gentilly, St Pierre, Verdun, Alma, Quartier Militaire, Providence, Mont Ida, Medine, Bel Etang, Camp de Masque, Unite, Bonne Mere, Boulet Rouge	Individual Operators
15D	Rose Hill	L'Esperance	Ebene Cybercity, Reduit, MGI, Helvetia, Gentilly, St Pierre, Verdun, Alma, Quartier Militaire, Bonne Veine	Individual Operators
16	Rose Hill	Central Flacq	Ebene Cybercity, Reduit, MGI, Helvetia, Gentilly, St Pierre, Verdun, Alma, Quartier Militaire, Providence, Melrose, Montagne Blanche, Lesur, Sebastopol, Clavet, Belle Rive, Olivia, Deep River, Pont Lardier, Bel Air, Ecroignard, Bramsthan, Boulet Rouge	Individual Operators
17	Curepipe/North	Central Flacq	Eau Coulee, Rue Couvent, Wooton, Belle Rive, Valetta, Quartier Militaire, Providence, Mont Ida, Medine, Bel Etang, Camp de Masque, Unite, Bonne Mere, Boulet Rouge	Individual Operators/UBS(Only at night for Workers)
18	Central Flacq	Mahebourg	Boulet Rouge, Bramsthan, Ecroignard, Bel Air, Ernest Florent, Beau Champ, GRSE, Deux Frères, Quatre Soeurs, Grand Sable, Petit Sable, Bambous Virieux, Anse Jonchee, Bois des Amourettes, Vieux Grand Port, Riviere des Creoles, Petit Bel Air, Ville Noire	Individual Operators
19	Port Louis/Immigration	Creve Coeur	Nicolay, Abercrombie, Ste Croix, Le Hochet, Terre Rouge, Bois Pignolet, Notre Dame, Baillache, Long Mountain, Valton	MBT/Mauritian Bus Transport
20	Port Louis/Immigration	Triolet	Nicolay, Abercrombie, Ste Croix, Le Hochet, Terre Rouge, St Joseph, Arsenal, SSRN Hospital, Solitude, 7/8/9th Mile, Terminus	TBS/Triolet Bus Service
20A	Port Louis/Immigration	Pointe aux Piments	Nicolay, Abercrombie, Ste Croix, Le Hochet, Terre Rouge, St Joseph, Arsenal, Solitude, Triolet(7/8th Mile), Camp Lilas, Camp Bestel	TBS/Triolet Bus Service
20B	Triolet	Fond du Sac	Triolet Bypass, Rouge Terre	TBS/Triolet Bus Service
20C	Port Louis/Immigration	St Antoine (Goodlands)	Nicolay, Abercrombie, Ste Croix, Le Hochet, Terre Rouge, St Joseph, Arsenal, SSRN Hospital, Morcellement St Andre, Solitude, Triolet (7th Mile, 8th Mile, 9th Mile), Trou aux Biches, Mont Choisy, Pointe aux Cannoniers, Chemin Casse Ghoon, Grand Baie, Pereybere, Bain Boeuf, Cap Malheureux, Pavillon, Camp Domaingue, Petit Raffray, Trois Bras	TBS/Triolet Bus Service
21	Port Louis/Immigration	Goodlands	Nicolay, Abercrombie, Ste Croix, Le Hochet, Terre Rouge, St Joseph, Arsenal, SSRN Hospital, Morcellement St Andre, Plaine des Papayes, Belle Vue Pilot, Fond du Sac, The Vale, Petit Raffray, Trois Bras	Individual Operators
22	Port Louis/Immigration	Grand Gaube	Nicolay, Abercrombie, Ste Croix, Le Hochet, Terre Rouge, Khoyratty, Calebasses, Pamplemousses, Belle Vue Harel, Forbach, Trois Bras, Goodlands, Roche Terre	Individual Operators
23	Port Louis/Immigration	Riviere du Rempart	Nicolay, Abercrombie, Ste Croix, Le Hochet, Terre Rouge, Khoyratty, Calebasses, Pamplemousses, Mon Gout, The Mount, Piton, Esperance Trebuchet, Poudre d'Or, Ile d'Ambre, Panchvati, Hermitage, Pointe des Lascars, Haute Rive	NTC
24	Port Louis/Immigration	Riviere du Rempart	Nicolay, Abercrombie, Ste Croix, Le Hochet, Terre Rouge, Khoyratty, Calebasses, Pamplemousses, Mon Gout, Grande Rosalie, Petite Julie, Amaury, Barlow, Belle Vue Maurel	NTC
26	Goodlands	Central Flacq	Belmont, Poudre d'Or, Ile d'Ambre, Panchvati, Hermitage, Haute Rive, Riviere du Rempart, Plaine des Roches, Roches Noires, Poste Lafayette, Poste de Flacq, Constance	Individual Operators/Divla Transport
27	Port Louis/Immigration	Riviere du Rempart	Nicolay, Abercrombie, Ste Croix, Le Hochet, Terre Rouge, Khoyratty, Calebasses, Pamplemousses, Belle Vue Harel, Mapou, Piton, Gokoolah, Amitie, Belle Vue Maurel	NTC
27A	Port Louis/Immigration	Roches Noires	Nicolay, Abercrombie, Ste Croix, Le Hochet, Terre Rouge, Khoyratty, Calebasses, Pamplemousses, Belle Vue Harel, Mapou, Piton, Gokoolah, Amitie, Belle Vue Maurel, Riviere du Rempart, Haute Rive	NTC
27B	Port Louis/Immigration	Plaine des Roches	Nicolay, Abercrombie, Ste Croix, Le Hochet, Terre Rouge, Khoyratty, Calebasses, Pamplemousses, Belle Vue Harel, Mapou, Piton, Gokoolah, Amitie, Belle Vue Maurel, Riviere du Rempart	NTC
28	Triolet	Riviere du Rempart	9/8/7th Mile, Solitude, Morcellement St Andre, Plaine des Papayes, Belle Vue Harel, Mapou, Piton, Gokoolah, Amitie, Belle Vue Maurel	TBS
29(Merged with Route 240 as of 13th March 2024)	Grand Baie	Central Flacq	Super U, La Croisette, Sottise, The Vale, Fond du Sac, Belle Vue Pilot, Plaine des Papayes, Belle Vue Harel, Piton, Gokoolah, Amitie, Belle Vue Maurel, Riviere du Rempart, Belle Vue Maurel, Bois Jacquot, Petite Retraite, Pont Blanc, Constance	TBS/Divla Transport
30	Curepipe/North	Dubreuil	Eau Coulee, Rue Couvent, Wooton, Belle Rive, Piton du Milieu, La Chartreuse	UBS
31	Ebene Cybercity	Bassin	Rose Hill, Boundary, Trefles, Berthaud, La Louise	RHT
33	Plaine Verte	Pailles	Desforges Street, Pope Hennessy St, Labourdonnais St, Dr Jeetoo Hospital, La Butte, Bell Village, Camp Chapelon, Les Guibies	UBS
33A	Cite Vallijee	Terre Rouge	Bell Village, La Butte, Casernes, Dr Jeetoo Hospital, Labourdonnais St, Pope Hennessy St, Desforges St, Plaine Verte, Cite Martial, Ste Croix, Le Hochet	UBS
33B	Plaine Verte	Cite Vallijee	Desforges Street, Pope Hennessy St, Labourdonnais St, Dr Jeetoo Hospital, La Butte, Bell Village, Cassis	UBS
34	Curepipe/South	Bois Cheri	Forest Side, Seizieme Mille, Nouvelle France, Pont Colville, Beau Climat, La Flora, Grand Bois	NTC
35	Vacoas	Hollyrood	La Caverne, Quinze Cantons	NTC
37	Curepipe/North	Mont Roches	Eau Coulee, Castel, Mesnil, St Paul, Clarisse, Vacoas, Savoy, La Caverne, Bonne Terre, Paillotte, Candos, La Louise, Quatre Bornes, Victoria Ave, Ollier Ave, St Patrick, Hugnin Road, Plaisance, Camp Levieux	NTC
37A	Curepipe/North	Camp Levieux	Floreal, Cite Mangalkhan, Vacoas, Savoy, La Caverne, Bonne Terre, Paillotte, Candos, La Louise, Quatre Bornes, Victoria Ave, Ollier Ave, St Patrick, Hugnin Road, Plaisance	NTC
39	Rose Hill	Plaisance	Hugnin Road, Ratsitatane Avenue	UBS
39A	Rose Hill	Camp Levieux	Hugnin Road, Plaisance	UBS
41/41A	Port Louis/Immigration	Vallee des Pretres	Desforges St, Plaine Verte St Francois Xavier St, Cite Martial, La Croisee, Carreau Lalo, Carolines	UBS
43	Curepipe/North	Camp Levieux	Eau Coulee, Castel, St Paul, Phoenix, Jumbo, Shoprite, Belle Rose, Rose Hill, Hugnin Road, Roches Brunes, Mont Roches	UBS
44	Curepipe/North	Camp les Juges	Forest Side, Cite Atlee, Labrasserie	UBS
45	Rose Hill	Albion	Hugnin Road, Roches Brunes, Mont Roches, St Martin, Cannot, Gros Cailloux, Petite Riviere, Camp Creoles, Belle Vue	UBS
45A	Rose Hill	Albion	Hugnin Road, Roches Brunes, Mont Roches, St Martin, Cannot, Morcellement Chazal	UBS
46	Mahebourg	Blue Bay	Cite la Chaux, Pointe Jerome, Pointe d'Esny, Preskil	Individual Operators
47	Port Louis/Immigration	Cite Vallijee	New Trunk Road, Bell Village, Cassis	UBS
50	Port Louis/Immigration	Tranquebar	Desforges St, Pope Hennessy St, Champs de Mars	UBS
51/51A	Port Louis/Immigration	Pointe aux Sables	Victoria Square, La Butte, Plaine Lauzun, GRNW, La Tour Koenig, Terrasson, Petit Verger, Pic Pic	TBS
52	Port Louis/Immigration	Medine	Victoria Square, La Butte, Plaine Lauzun, GRNW, Richelieu, Petite Riviere, Gros Cailloux, Cannot, Bambous	NTC
52A	Port Louis/Immigration	Albion	Victoria Square, La Butte, Plaine Lauzun, GRNW, Richelieu, Petite Riviere, Camp Creoles, Belle Vue	NTC
52B	Port Louis/Immigration	Bambous/Geoffroy NHDC	Victoria Square, La Butte, Plaine Lauzun, GRNW, Richelieu, Petite Riviere, Gros Cailloux, Cannot, Bambous	NTC
52C	Port Louis/Immigration	Bambous/La Valette	Victoria Square, La Butte, Plaine Lauzun, GRNW, Richelieu, Petite Riviere, Gros Cailloux, Cannot, Bambous	NTC
53	Goodlands	Central Flacq	Belmont, Poudre d'Or, Ile d'Ambre, Panchvati, Hermitage, Haute Rive, Riviere du Rempart, Belle Vue Maurel, Amaury, Laventure, Petite Retraite, Pont Blanc, Constance	Individual Operators
55	Central Flacq	Trou d'Eau Douce	Boulet Rouge, Boulet Rouge, La Gaieté, Bramsthan, Camp Ithier	Individual Operators
56	Central Flacq	GRSE	Boulet Rouge, Bramsthan, Ecroignard, Bel Air, Ernest Florent, Beau Champ	NTC
57	Quatre Bornes	Flic en Flac	La Louise, Palma, Beaux Songes, Geoffroy, Bambous, Cascavelle Mall, Domaine Anna	Individual Operators
61	Curepipe/South	Camp Diable	Forest Side, Seizieme Mille, Nouvelle France, Pont Coalville, Beau Climat, La Flora, Riviere du Poste, Riviere Dragon, Riche Bois	NTC
61A	Curepipe/South	Camp Diable	Forest Side, Seizieme Mille, Nouvelle France, Pont Coalville, Beau Climat, La Flora, Riviere du Poste, Riviere Dragon, Britannia, Tyack, Riviere des Anguilles, Batimarais, St Amand, Benares	NTC
62	Curepipe/South	Riviere du Poste	Forest Side, Seizieme Mille, Nouvelle France, Union Park, Balisson, Rose Belle, JN Hospital, New Grove, Mare Tabac	Individual Operators
63	SSRN Hospital	Roches Noires	Beau Plan, Mahogany Mall, Pamplemousses, Mon Gout, Grande Rosalie, Petite Julie, Amaury, Belle Vue Maurel, Riviere du Rempart, Haute Rive	NTC
63A	Port Louis/Immigration	Roches Noires	Nicolay, Abercrombie, Ste Croix, Le Hochet, Terre Rouge, St Joseph, Arsenal, SSRN Hospital, Beau Plan, Mahogany Mall, Pamplemousses, Mon Gout, Grande Rosalie, Petite Julie, Amaury, Belle Vue Maurel, Riviere du Rempart, Haute Rive	NTC
65A	Quatre Bornes	Hermitage	St Antoine, Camp Fouquereaux, Highlands, Phoenix, St Paul, Clarisse, Vacoas, Palmerstone, Jumbo, Carreau Laliane, Candos, La Louise	UBS
65B	Quatre Bornes	Hermitage	Cinq Arpents, Belle Terre, Highlands, Phoenix, St Paul, Clarisse, Vacoas, Palmerstone, Jumbo, Carreau Laliane, Candos, La Louise	UBS
66	Vacoas	Henrietta/Bord Cascades	Reunion, Diolle, Glen Park, Camp Mapou	Individual Operators
66A	Vacoas	La Marie	Reunion, Diolle, Glen Park, Morcellement Pousson	NTC
66B	Vacoas	Curepipe/South	Reunion, Diolle, Glen Park, Morcellement Pousson, La Marie, Labrasserie, Camp Les Juges, Forest Side	NTC
66C	Bonne Terre	Grand Bassin	Vacoas, Reunion, Diolle, Glen Park, Morcellement Pousson, La Marie, Beard, Mare aux Vacoas, Plaine Sophie, Petrin	NTC
67	Rose Hill	Riviere des Galets	Ebene Cybercity, Trianon/Shoprite, Phoenix, Highlands, Camp Fouquereaux, Wooton, La Vigie, Midlands, Nouvelle France, Pont Colville, Beau Climat, La Flora, Riviere du Poste, Britannia, Tyack, Riviere des Anguilles, Union Ducray, St Aubin, Bain des Negresses, Souillac, Surinam, Belle Vue, Chemin Grenier	NTC
68	Curepipe/North	Edward VII	Eau Coulee, Castel, Mesnil, St Paul, Clarisse, SMF, Vacoas, Savoy, Modern Square, Bonne Terre, Paillotte, Candos, La Louise, Quatre Bornes, Victoria Ave, Plaisance	NTC
68A	Curepipe/North	Edward VII	Floreal, Cite Mangalkhan, Vacoas, Savoy, Modern Square, Bonne Terre, Paillotte, Candos, La Louise, Quatre Bornes, Victoria Ave, Plaisance	NTC
69	Port Louis/Victoria	Beau Songes	La Butte, Plaine Lauzun, GRNW, Coromandel, Beau Bassin, Rose Hill, Belle Rose, St Jean, Quatre Bornes, La Louise, Palma	NTC
70	Port Louis/Immigration	Cite la Cure	Quay D, Roche Bois, Cocoterie, Abercrombie, Ste Croix, Pere Laval	Individual Operators
71	Port Louis/Immigration	Poudre d'Or	Nicolay, Abercrombie, Ste Croix, Le Hochet, Terre Rouge, Khoyratty, Calebasses, Pamplemousses, Mahogany Mall, Bois Rouge, Mon Rocher, La Louisa, Belle Vue Harel, Labourdonnais, Cottage, Esperance Trebuchet, Poudre d'Or Hamlet	Individual Operators
72	Port Louis/Immigration	Jumbo Riche Terre	Quay D, Roche Bois, NTR, Riche Terre Industrial Zone	UBS
73	Curepipe	Hermitage	Eau Coulee, Castel, Quatre Carreaux, Camp Fouquereaux, St Antoine, Cinq Arpents	UBS
74	St Pierre	Reduit	Helvetia, Gentilly, Telfair, Moka Hospital, Bagatelle	Individual Operators
75	Triolet	Pamplemousses	9th Mile, 8th Mile, 7th Mile, Solitude, Morcellement St Andre, SSRN Hospital, Mahogany Mall/Beau Plan	TBS
75A	SSRN Hospital	Pamplemousses	Mahogany Mall/Beau Plan	TBS
77	Port Louis/Immigration	Baie du Tombeau	Quay D, Roche Bois, Elizabethville, Pte Roches Noires, St Malo, Jumbo Riche Terre	Individual Operators
77A	Port Louis/Immigration	Terre Rouge	Quay D, Roche Bois, Cocoterie, NTR, Riche Terre, Jin Fei	UBS
78	Port Louis/Immigration	Riche Terre	Nicolay, Abercrombie, Ste Croix, Pere Laval, Cite Roma	UBS
79	Rose Belle	Bois Cheri	JN Hospital, Balisson, Wireless Road, Beau Climat, La Flora, Grand Bois	NTC
80	Curepipe/North	Sebastopol	Eau Coulee, Couvent St, Wooton, Belle Rive, Valetta, Quartier Militaire, Providence, Melrose, Montagne Blanche, Lesur, Pellegrin	Individual Operators
81	Curepipe/North	Allee Brillant	Sivananda Ave, Eau Coulee, Charles Regnaud St, Engrais Martial	Individual Operators
82	Port Louis/Immigration	St Antoine	Nicolay, Abercrombie, Ste Croix, Le Hochet, Terre Rouge, Arsenal, Powder Mills, SSRN Hospital, Morcellement St Andre, Solitude, 7th Mile, 8th Mile, 9th Mile, Triolet, Trou aux Biches, Mont Choisy, Pointe aux Cannoniers, Grand Baie, Pereybere, Bain Boeuf, Cap Malheureux, Anse la Raie, Calodyne, St Francois, Trois Bras, Belin	TBS
82A	Port Louis/Immigration	Cap Malheureux	Nicolay, Abercrombie, Ste Croix, Le Hochet, Terre Rouge, Arsenal, Solitude, 7th Mile, 8th Mile, 9th Mile, Triolet, Trou aux Biches, Mont Choisy, Pointe aux Cannoniers, Grand Baie, Pereybere, Bain Boeuf	TBS
82B	Port Louis/Immigration	St Francois	Nicolay, Abercrombie, Ste Croix, Le Hochet, Terre Rouge, Arsenal, Powder Mills, SSRN Hospital, Morcellement St Andre, Solitude, 7th Mile, 8th Mile, 9th Mile, Triolet, Trou aux Biches, Mont Choisy, Pointe aux Cannoniers, Grand Baie, Pereybere, Bain Boeuf, Cap Malheureux, Anse la Raie, Calodyne	TBS
83	St Antoine	Grand Baie/La Croisette	Belin, Trois Bras, Petit Raffray, Cap Malheureux, Bain Boeuf, Pereybere, Chemin Vieux Moulin, Oasis Residence, Chemin 20 Pieds, Super U	TBS
83A	Grand Baie/Super U	Solitude	Grand Baie/La Croisette, Grand Baie, Pointe aux Cannoniers, Mont Choisy, Trou aux Biches, Triolet, 9th Mile, 8th Mile, Triolet Mediclinic, 7th Mile	TBS
84	SSRN Hospital	Plaine des Roches	Mahogany Mall/Beau Plan, Pamplemousses, Bois Rouge, Mon Rocher, La Louisa, Belle Vue Harel, Mapou, Piton, Gokoola-Amitie, Mon Loisir, Belle Vue Maurel, Riviere du Rempart	NTC
84A	Port Louis/Immigration	Riviere du Rempart	Nicolay, Abercrombie, Ste Croix, Le Hochet, Terre Rouge, Arsenal, Powder Mills, SSRN Hospital, Mahogany Mall/Beau Plan, Pamplemousses, Bois Rouge, Mon Rocher, La Louisa, Belle Vue Harel, Mapou, Piton, Gokoola-Amitie, Mon Loisir, Belle Vue Maurel	NTC
85	Port Louis/Immigration	Riviere du Rempart	Nicolay, Abercrombie, Ste Croix, Le Hochet, Terre Rouge, Arsenal, Powder Mills, SSRN Hospital, Mahogany Mall/Beau Plan, Pamplemousses, Bois Rouge, Mon Rocher, La Louisa, Belle Vue Harel, Mapou, Piton, Esperance Piton, Poudre d'Or Hamlet, Esperance Trebuchet, Schoenfeld	NTC
86	Port Louis/Immigration	Riviere du Rempart	Nicolay, Abercrombie, Ste Croix, Le Hochet, Terre Rouge, Arsenal, Powder Mills, SSRN Hospital, Mahogany Mall/Beau Plan, Pamplemousses, Mon Gout, The Mount, Mont Piton, Piton, Esperance Piton, Poudre d'Or Hamlet, Esperance Trebuchet, Poudre d'Or, Ile d'Ambre, Panchvati, Hermitage, Pointe des Lascars, Haute Rive	NTC
87	Curepipe/South	St Hubert	Forest Side, Seizieme Mille, Montee Lapeyre, Nouvelle France, Union Park, Balisson, Rose Belle, JN Hospital, New Grove, La Rosa, Deux Bras, Mare Chicose, Riche en Eau, St Hilaire, Cent Gaulettes	Individual Operators/NTC
88	Port Louis/Immigration	Congomah	Nicolay, Abercrombie, Ste Croix, Le Hochet, Terre Rouge, Arsenal, Powder Mills, SSRN Hospital, Mahogany Mall/Beau Plan, Pamplemousses, Camp des Embrevades, Ilot, D'Épinay	Luna Transport
89	Port Louis/Immigration	Creve Coeur	Nicolay, Abercrombie, Ste Croix, Le Hochet, Terre Rouge, La Croisee Mte Longue, Bois Pignolet, Notre Dame, Kitchin, Baillache, Long Mountain, Camp la Boue, Valton, Boulingrin	MBT
89A	Port Louis/Immigration	St Pierre	Nicolay, Abercrombie, Ste Croix, Le Hochet, Terre Rouge, La Croisee Mte Longue, Bois Pignolet, Notre Dame, Kitchin, Baillache, Long Mountain, Camp la Boue, Montagne Calebasses, Les Mariannes, Eau Bouille, Nouvelle Decouverte, Ripailles, Beau Bois, L'Avenir	MBT
91	Port Louis/Immigration	Curepipe/North	Victoria Square, La Butte, Plaine Lauzun, GRNW, Coromandel, Beau Bassin, Rose Hill, Belle Rose, Trianon/Shoprite, Pont Fer, Phoenix, St Paul, Mesnil, Castel, Eau Coulee	UBS
93	Port Louis/Victoria	Camp Thorel	La Butte, Camp Chapelon, Pailles, Soreze, Bagatelle, Reduit, MGI, Gentilly, Helvetia, St Pierre, Verdun, Alma, Quartier Militaire, Providence, St Julien d'Hotman	Individual Operators
93A	Port Louis/Victoria	L'Esperance	La Butte, Camp Chapelon, Pailles, Soreze, Bagatelle, Reduit, MGI, Gentilly, Helvetia, St Pierre, Verdun, Alma, Quartier Militaire	Individual Operators
94	Goodlands	Riviere du Rempart	Beau Plateau, Cottage, Esperance Trebuchet, Poudre d'Or Hamlet, Esperance Piton, Piton, Gokoola-Amitie, Mon Loisir, Belle Vue Maurel	Individual Operators
95	Pamplemousses	Goodlands	Mahogany Mall/Beau Plan, SSRN Hospital, Powder Mills, Solitude, Triolet (7th/8th/9th Mile), Trou aux Biches, Mont Choisy, Pointe aux Cannoniers, Grand Baie, Pereybere, Cap Malheureux, Anse la Raie, Calodyne, Grand Gaube, Roche Terre, Mapou Leclezio, Belin	TBS
96	Creve Coeur	Jumbo Riche Terre	Boulingrin, Valton, Long Mountain, Baillache, Kitchin, Notre Dame, Bois Pignolet, La Croisee Mte Longue, Terre Rouge, Le Hochet, Ste Croix, Cite Roma, Riche Terre	MBT
98	Curepipe/North	St Pierre	Eau Coulee, Castel, Mesnil, St Paul, Phoenix, Verdun Highway, Côte d'Or, Courchamps, Circonstance, Helvetia	UBS
99	Mahebourg	Mon Desert	Beau Vallon, La Grotte, Plaine Magnien, Union Vale, Trois Boutiques, Carreau Esnouf, Kenya, Carreau Accacia, Le Bouchon, Camp Carol	Individual Operators
100	Curepipe/North	St Pierre	Eau Coulee, Castel, Camp Fouquereaux, Cinq Arpents, Hermitage, Morcellement Aurea, Côte d'Or, Courchamps, Circonstance, Helvetia	UBS
101	Central Flacq	SSRN Hospital	Constance, Pont Blanc, Petite Retraite, Laventure, Grande Retraite, Bon Accueil, Brisee Verdiere, Mare d'Australia, Pont Praslin, Ville Bague, Grande Rosalie, Petite Rosalie, Mon Gout, Pamplemousses, Mahogany Mall/Beau Plan	Individual Operators
101A	Central Flacq	SSRN Hospital	Boulet Rouge, Bonne Mere, FUEL, Riche Fond, St Julien, Lalmatie, Mission Cross Road, Bon Accueil, Brisee Verdiere, Mare d'Australia, Pont Praslin, Ville Bague, Grande Rosalie, Petite Rosalie, Mon Gout, Pamplemousses, Mahogany Mall/Beau Plan	Individual Operators
101C	Central Flacq	SSRN Hospital	Boulet Rouge, Bonne Mere, FUEL, Riche Fond, St Julien, Lalmatie, Belvedere, Brisee Verdiere, Mare d'Australia, Pont Praslin, Ville Bague, Grande Rosalie, Petite Rosalie, Mon Gout, Pamplemousses, Mahogany Mall/Beau Plan	Individual Operators
102	Port Louis/Victoria	Curepipe/North	La Butte, Plaine Lauzun, GRNW, Coromandel, Beau Bassin, Rose Hill, Belle Rose, Trianon/Shoprite, Jumbo, Phoenix, St Paul, Clarisse, Mangalkhan, Floreal	NTC
103	Port Louis/Victoria	Nouvelle Decouverte	La Butte, Camp Chapelon, Les Guibies, Pailles, Soreze, Montagne Ory, Moka Hospital, Bois Cheri, Petit Verger, St Pierre, L'Avenir, Beau Bois, Ripailles, Eau Bouille	Individual Operators
103A	Port Louis/Victoria	La Laura	La Butte, Camp Chapelon, Les Guibies, Pailles, Soreze, Bagatelle, Reduit, MGI, Gentilly, Helvetia, St Pierre, L'Avenir, Malinga	Individual Operators
104	Curepipe/North	Icery	Forum, La Vigie, La Croix St	Individual Operators
105	Rose Hill	Vuillemin	Ebene, Reduit, MGI, Moka Hospital, Gentilly, Helvetia, St Pierre, Verdun, Dagotiere, Lower Dagotiere, Upper Dagotiere, Valetta	Individual Operators
106	Port Louis/Immigration	Central Flacq	Nicolay, Abercrombie, Ste Croix, Le Hochet, Terre Rouge, Khoyratty, Calebasses, Pamplemousses, Mon Gout, Petite Rosalie, Grande Rosalie, Ville Bague, Pont Praslin, Mare d'Australia, Brisee Verdiere, Bon Accueil, Mission Cross Road, Lalmatie, St Julien, Riche Fond, FUEL, Bonne Mere, Boulet Rouge	Individual Operators
109	Port Louis/Immigration	Central Flacq	Nicolay, Abercrombie, Ste Croix, Le Hochet, Terre Rouge, Khoyratty, Calebasses, Pamplemousses, Mon Gout, Petite Rosalie, Grande Rosalie, Ville Bague, Pont Praslin, Mare d'Australia, Brisee Verdiere, Belvedere, Lalmatie, St Julien, Riche Fond, FUEL, Bonne Mere, Boulet Rouge	Individual Operators
110	Port Louis/Immigration	Congomah	Nicolay, Abercrombie, Ste Croix, Le Hochet, Terre Rouge, Khoyratty, Ilot, D'Épinay	Luna Transport
111	Port Louis/Immigration	Central Flacq	Nicolay, Abercrombie, Ste Croix, Le Hochet, Terre Rouge, Khoyratty, Calebasses, Pamplemousses, Mon Gout, Petite Rosalie, Grande Rosalie, Ville Bague, Pont Praslin, Mare d'Australia, Brisee Verdiere, Bon Accueil, Grande Retraite, Laventure, Petite Retraite, Pont Blanc, Constance	Individual Operators
112	Port Louis/Immigration	Central Flacq	Nicolay, Abercrombie, Ste Croix, Le Hochet, Terre Rouge, Khoyratty, Calebasses, Pamplemousses, Mon Gout, Petite Rosalie, Grande Rosalie, Ville Bague, Pont Praslin, Mare d'Australia, Brisee Verdiere, Bon Accueil, Mission Cross Road, Lalmatie, St Julien, Belle Vue Allendy, SAJ Hospital, Constance	Individual Operators
113	Port Louis/Victoria	Camp de Masque Pave	La Butte, Les Guibies, Pailles, Soreze, Bagatelle, Reduit, MGI, Gentilly, Helvetia, St Pierre, Verdun, Alma, Quartier Militaire, Providence, Mont Ida, Medine, Bel Etang, Unite, Camp de Masque	Individual Operators
114	Curepipe/North	Cite Malherbes	Eau Coulee, Abbe de la Caille St	Individual Operators
115/115A	Cite Vallijee	Plaine Verte	La Butte, Casernes Centrale, Dr AG Jeetoo Hospital, Labourdonnais St, Wellington St, Tranquebar, Boulevard Victoria, Champs de Mars, Inkerman St, Vallee Pitot, Cite Rozemont	UBS
117	Port Louis/Immigration	Congomah	Nicolay, Abercrombie, Ste Croix, Le Hochet, Terre Rouge, Khoyratty, Calebasses, Pamplemousses, Camp des Embrevades, Ilot, D'Épinay	Luna Transport
119	Port Louis/Immigration	Riviere Noire	Victoria Square, La Butte, Plaine Lauzun, GRNW, Montee S, Richelieu, Petite Riviere, Gros Cailloux, Cannot, La Ferme, Bambous, Cascavelle Mall, Cascavelle Village, Clarence, Tamarin, La Preneuse, Grande Riviere Noire	NTC
120	Port Louis/Immigration	Baie du Cap	Victoria Square, La Butte, Plaine Lauzun, GRNW, Montee S, Richelieu, Petite Riviere, Gros Cailloux, Cannot, La Ferme, Bambous, Cascavelle Mall, Cascavelle Village, Clarence, Tamarin, La Preneuse, Grande Riviere Noire, Petite Riviere Noire, Case Noyale, La Gaulette, Coteau Raffin, Le Morne, La Prairie, Maconde	NTC/Individual Operators
121	Curepipe/North	Camp Levieux (Eau Coulee)	Eau Coulee, Mgr Leen St	Individual Operators
122	Curepipe/North	Camp Levieux	Floreal, Cite Mangalkhan, Vacoas, Savoy, La Caverne, Bonne Terre, Paillotte, Candos, La Louise, Quatre Bornes, Victoria Ave, Stanley Ave, Pavilion, Boundary Ave, Trefles, Stanley, Plaisance	NTC
122A	Curepipe/North	Camp Levieux	Eau Coulee, Castel, Mesnil, St Paul, Clarisse, Vacoas, Savoy, La Caverne, Bonne Terre, Paillotte, Candos, La Louise, Quatre Bornes, Victoria Ave, Stanley Ave, Pavilion, Boundary Ave, Trefles, Stanley, Plaisance	NTC
123	Port Louis/Immigration	Flic en Flac	Victoria Square, La Butte, Plaine Lauzun, GRNW, Montee S, Richelieu, Petite Riviere, Gros Cailloux, Cannot, La Ferme, Bambous, Cascavelle Mall, Domaine Anna, Wolmar	NTC/Luna Transport/Individual Operators
125	Curepipe/North	Cite la Caverne	Floreal, Cite Mangalkhan, Vacoas, Savoy, La Caverne, Visitation, La Caverne 1	NTC
127 (Express)	Port Louis/Immigration	Riviere du Rempart	New Trunk Road, Terre Rouge, Calebasses, Pamplemousses, Mon Gout, The Mount, Piton, Gokoolah-Amitie, Mon Loisir, Belle Vue Maurel	NTC
128	Curepipe/North	Les Casernes	Brown Sequard St, St Clement St, Route du Jardin, Curepipe Botanical Garden	Individual Operators
131	Curepipe/North	Cite l'Oiseau	Farquhar St, Eau Coulee, Castel, Engrais Martial	Individual Operators
132	Rose Hill	Trefles	Gladstone St, Hugnin Road, Boundary Ave	Individual Operators
133/133A	Curepipe/South	Choisy/Baie du Cap	Forest Side, Seizieme Mille, Montee Lapeyre, Nouvelle France, Pont Colville, Beau Climat, La Flora, Riviere du Poste, Britannia, Tyack, Riviere des Anguilles, Union Ducray, St Aubin, Bain des Negresses, Souillac, Surinam, Belle Vue, Chemin Grenier, Riviere des Galets, Beau Champs, Bel Ombre, St Martin, Baie du Cap	NTC
134	Curepipe/North	Bord Cascades	Floreal, Cite Mangalkhan, Allee Brillant, Sadally, Pandit Sahadeo Road, Cantin, Diolle, Glen Park, Henrietta	NTC
135	Port Louis/Victoria	Vuillemin	La Butte, Camp Chapelon, Les Guibies, Pailles, Soreze, Montagne Ory, Moka Hospital, Bois Cheri, Petit Verger, St Pierre, Verdun, Dagotiere, Valetta	Individual Operators
137	Curepipe/South	Carreau Accacia	Forest Side, Seizieme Mille, Montee Lapeyre, Nouvelle France, Union Park, Balisson, Rose Belle, JN Hospital, New Grove, La Rosa, Mare d'Albert, Plaine Magnien, Union Vale, Carreau Esnouf, Mon Desert, Camp Carol, Le Bouchon	NTC/Individual Operators
139	Port Louis/Immigration	La Paix (Extension to Vallee Pitot)	Louis Pasteur St, Desforges St, La Paix St, Vallee Pitot, Cite Rozemont	Individual Operators
140	Port Louis/Victoria	Hermitage	La Butte, Plaine Lauzun, GRNW, Coromandel, Beau Bassin, Rose Hill, Belle Rose, Trianon/Shoprite, Pont Fer, Phoenix, Highlands, Belle Terre	UBS
141	Port Louis/Victoria	Bord Cascades	Cassis, Camp Chapelon, Les Guibies, Pailles, Soreze, Bagatelle, Reduit, Tribeca Mall, Pellegrin, Trianon/Shoprite, Jumbo Phoenix, Palmerstone, Vacoas Gymkhana, Clarisse, Vacoas, Reunion, Cantin, Diolle, Glen Park, Henrietta	NTC
144	Curepipe/North	O'Connor	Camp Caval, Robinson	Individual Operators
145	Port Louis/Victoria	Trefles	La Butte, Plaine Lauzun, GRNW, Coromandel, Beau Bassin, Barkly, Roches Brunes, Plaisance, Stanley	RHT
146	Rose Hill	Tribeca Mall	Ebene Cybercity	RHT
148	Cite Vallijee	Cite la Cure	Bell Village, La Butte, Casernes, Dr AG Jeetoo Hospital, Labourdonnais St, Desforges St, Plaine Verte, Cite Martial, Route des Pamplemousses, Ste Croix, Pere Laval	UBS
149	Port Louis/Victoria	Labrasserie	La Butte, Plaine Lauzun, GRNW, Coromandel, Beau Bassin, Rose Hill, Belle Rose, Trianon/Shoprite, Jumbo Phoenix, Pont Fer, Phoenix, St Paul, Mesnil, Castel, Eau Coulee, Curepipe, Forest Side	UBS
150	Pailles	Vallee Pitot	Montebello, La Chimere, GRNW, Cite Vallijee, Bell Village, La Butte, Casernes, Dr AG Jeetoo Hospital, Tranquebar, Boulevard Victoria	Individual Operators
152	Cite Vallijee	Baie du Tombeau	Bell Village, Casernes, Dr AG Jeetoo Hospital, Labourdonnais St, Desforges St, Plaine Verte, St Francois Xavier St, Nicolay, Abercrombie, Briquetterie, Cocoterie, Elizabethville, Le Goulet	UBS
153	Curepipe/North	St Pierre	Floreal, Cite Mangalkhan, Vacoas, Savoy, La Caverne, Bonne Terre, Paillotte, Candos, La Louise, Quatre Bornes, St Jean, Pellegrin, Ebene Cybercity, Reduit, MGI, Moka Hospital, Gentilly, Helvetia	NTC
156	Port Louis/Victoria	Ollier	La Butte, Plaine Lauzun, GRNW, Coromandel, Beau Bassin, Rose Hill, Belle Rose, Remy Ollier Ave, Berthaud Ave	NTC
156A	Rose Hill	La Source NHDC	Belle Rose, St Jean, Quatre Bornes, La Louise	NTC
158	Grand Baie/Super U	Poudre d'Or	La Croisette, The Vale, Forbach, Cottage, Esperance Trebuchet, Poudre d'Or Hamlet	Individual Operators
159	Port Louis/Immigration	Poudre d'Or	Nicolay, Abercrombie, Ste Croix, Le Hochet, Terre Rouge, Arsenal, Powder Mills, SSRN Hospital, Morcellement St Andre, Plaine des Papayes, Bois Mangues, Belle Vue Harel, Labourdonnais, Cottage, Esperance Trebuchet, Poudre d'Or Hamlet	Individual Operators
160	Cite Vallijee	Vallee des Pretres	Bell Village, La Butte, Casernes, Dr AG Jeetoo Hospital, Labourdonnais St, Desforges St, Plaine Verte, Cite Martial, Route des Pamplemousses, Carreau Lalo, Carolines	UBS
162	Port Louis/Victoria (Express)	Curepipe (Express)	Cassis, Camp Chapelon, Les Guibies, Pailles, Soreze, Bagatelle, Tribeca Mall, Pellegrin, Trianon/Shoprite, Pont Fer, Phoenix, St Paul, Mesnil, Castel, Eau Coulee	UBS
163	Port Louis/Victoria (Express)	Vacoas (Express)	Cassis, Camp Chapelon, Les Guibies, Pailles, Soreze, Bagatelle, Tribeca Mall, Pellegrin, St Jean, Quatre Bornes, La Louise, Candos, Paillotte, Bonne Terre, La Caverne, Savoy	NTC
164	Curepipe/North	St Pierre	Floreal, Cite Mangalkhan, Vacoas, Palmerstone, Phoenix, Pont Fer, Trianon/Shoprite, Pellegrin, Ebene Cybercity, Reduit, MGI, Gentilly	NTC
165	Curepipe/North	St Pierre	Floreal, Cite Mangalkhan, Vacoas, Palmerstone, Phoenix, Pont Fer, Trianon/Shoprite, Pellegrin, Ebene Cybercity, Reduit, Bagatelle, Moka Hospital, Bois Cheri, Petit Verger	NTC
166	Vacoas	Cite la Caverne	Bonne Terre, Hollyrood	NTC
167	Bord Cascades	St Pierre	Henrietta, Glen Park, Diolle, Cantin, Vacoas, Pere Laval Avenue, Palmerstone, Jumbo Phoenix, Pont Fer, Trianon/Shoprite, Pellegrin, Ebene Cybercity, Reduit, MGI, Gentilly	NTC
168	Curepipe/South	Grand Bassin	Forest Side, Camp Bombaye, Seizieme Mille, Lapeyre Hill, Nouvelle France, Pont Colville, Beau Climat, La Flora, Grand Bois, Bois Cheri, Polidor (Kanaka Crater), Gooly	NTC
169	Central Flacq	Petite Cabane	Boulet Rouge, Bonne Mere, FUEL, Unite, Balance John, Camp Sonah, Camp de Masque Pave	Individual Operators
170	Port Louis/Victoria	Curepipe/North	La Butte, Plaine Lauzun, GRNW, Coromandel, Beau Bassin, Rose Hill, Belle Rose, St Jean, Quatre Bornes, La Louise, Candos, Bonne Terre, La Caverne, Savoy, Vacoas, Clarisse, St Paul, Mesnil, Castel, Engrais Martial, Eau Coulee	NTC
170A	Port Louis/Victoria	Curepipe/North	La Butte, Plaine Lauzun, GRNW, Coromandel, Beau Bassin, Rose Hill, Belle Rose, St Jean, Quatre Bornes, La Louise, Candos, Bonne Terre, La Caverne, Savoy, Vacoas, Cite Mangalkhan, Floreal	NTC
171	Port Louis/Immigration	Pointe aux Piments	Nicolay, Abercrombie, Ste Croix, Le Hochet, Terre Rouge, St Joseph, Arsenal, SSRN Hospital, Morcellement St Andre, Solitude, Triolet (7th Mile, 8th Mile), Camp Lilas, Camp Bestel	TBS
172	Rose Hill	Roches Brunes	Plaisance, Mont Roches	UBS
173	Curepipe/North	St Pierre	Eau Coulee, Engrais Martial, Castel, Mesnil, St Paul, Phoenix, Jumbo Phoenix, Pont Fer, Trianon/Shoprite, Pellegrin, Ebene Cybercity, Reduit, MGI, Moka Hospital, Gentilly	UBS
173A	Curepipe/North	St Pierre	Eau Coulee, Engrais Martial, Castel, Mesnil, St Paul, Phoenix, Jumbo Phoenix, Pont Fer, Trianon/Shoprite, Pellegrin, Ebene Cybercity, Reduit, MGI, Moka Hospital, Bois Cheri, Petit Verger	UBS
174/174A	Port Louis/Victoria	Rose Hill (Express)	La Butte, Bell Village, Camp Chapelon, Pailles, Soreze, Bagatelle, Reduit, Ebene Cybercity	RHT
175	Creve Coeur	SSRN Hospital	Valton, Long Mountain, Baillache, Kitchin, Notre Dame, Bois Pignolet, La Croisee Mte Longue, Khoyratty, Calebasses, Pamplemousses, Mahogany Mall/Beau Plan	MBT
176	Port Louis/Immigration	Central Flacq	Nicolay, Abercrombie, Ste Croix, Le Hochet, Terre Rouge, La Croisee Mte Longue, Khoyratty, Ilot, D'Épinay, Grande Rosalie, Ville Bague, Pont Praslin, Mare d'Australia, Brisee Verdiere, Bon Accueil, Mission Cross Road, Lalmatie, St Julien Village, Belle Vue Allendy, Constance	Individual Operators
177	Rose Hill	Chebel	Ambrose, Beau Bassin, St John	RHT
178	Madame Azor (Goodlands)	Melville	Goodlands, Belin, Roche Terre, Grand Gaube	Individual Operators
179	Curepipe/North	Flic en Flac	Eau Coulee, Engrais Martial, Castel, Mesnil, St Paul, Clarisse, Vacoas, Savoy, La Caverne, Bonne Terre, Candos, La Louise, Palma, Pierrefonds, Beau Songes, Montee Bol, Bambous, Medine, Cascavelle Mall, Domaine Anna, Wolmar	NTC
179A	Curepipe/North	Flic en Flac	Floreal, Cite Mangalkhan, Vacoas, Savoy, La Caverne, Bonne Terre, Candos, La Louise, Palma, Pierrefonds, Beau Songes, Montee Bol, Bambous, Medine, Cascavelle Mall, Domaine Anna, Wolmar	NTC
182	Cite la Cure	Chebel	Pere Laval, Ste Croix, Route des Pamplemousses, Cite Martial, Plaine Verte, Magon St, Boulevard Victoria, Vallee Pitot, Champs de Mars, Tranquebar, Inkerman St, Dr Jeetoo Hospital, La Butte, Bell Village, Plaine Lauzun, GRNW, La Tour Koenig, Coromandel, Belle Etoile, Gros Cailloux	Individual Operators/RHT
185	Port Louis/Immigration	Bois Marchand	Nicolay, Ste Croix, Le Hochet, Terre Rouge, Bois Marchand Cemetery	Individual Operators
187	Goodlands	Melle Jeanne	Plateau Road	Individual Operators
188	Port Louis/Victoria	Sodnac	La Butte, Bell Village, Camp Chapelon, Pailles, Soreze, Bagatelle, Reduit, Pellegrin, St Jean, Cite St Jean	NTC
189	Ebene Cybercity	Flic en Flac	Rose Hill, Hugnin Road, Roches Brunes, Mont Roches, St Martin, Cannot, Bambous, Medine, Cascavelle Mall, Domaine Anna, Wolmar	Individual Operators/NTC
190	Port Louis/Immigration	Port Louis/Immigration	NTR, Victoria, Brabant St, Les Casernes, Place d'Armes, Louis Pasteur St	NTC
191	Port Louis/Immigration	Curepipe/North (Express)	Victoria, Bell Village, Camp Chapelon, Pailles, Soreze, Bagatelle, Reduit, Ebene Cybercity, Pellegrin, Trianon/Shoprite, Pont Fer, Phoenix, Highlands, Camp Fouquereaux, Wooton, Couvent St, Eau Coulee	UBS
191A	Port Louis/Immigration	Curepipe/North (Express)	Victoria, Bell Village, Camp Chapelon, Pailles, Soreze, Bagatelle, Reduit, Ebene Cybercity, Pellegrin, Trianon/Shoprite, Pont Fer, Phoenix, St Paul, Mesnil, Castel, Eau Coulee	UBS
193	Curepipe/North	Belle Terre	Eau Coulee, Castel, Galea, Camp Fouquereaux, St Antoine, Morcellement Hurpaul, Highlands	UBS
194	Central Flacq	Quatre Soeurs (Marie Jeanne)	Boulet Rouge, Bramsthan, Ecroignard, Caroline, Bel Air, La Lucie Roy, Ernest Florent, Beau Champ, GRSE, Deux Freres	Individual Operators
195	Quatre Bornes	Jumbo Phoenix	Sodnac, Glaieuls Ave	NTC
196	Port Louis/Immigration	Congomah	Nicolay, Abercrombie, Ste Croix, Le Hochet, Terre Rouge, La Croisee Mte Longue, Melle Laure, Khoyratty, Calebasses, Pamplemousses, Canton Nancy, Mon Gout, D'Épinay	Luna Transport
197	Port Louis/Victoria	Riviere des Galets	Cassis, Bell Village, Camp Chapelon, Pailles, Soreze, Bagatelle, Reduit, Pellegrin, Trianon/Shoprite, Pont Fer, Phoenix, Highlands, Camp Fouquereaux, Wooton, La Vigie, Midlands, Nouvelle France, Pont Colville, Beau Climat, La Flora, Riviere Dragon, Britannia, Tyack, Riviere des Anguilles, Union Ducray, St Aubin, Souillac, Surinam, Belle Vue, Chemin Grenier	NTC
197A	Port Louis/Victoria	Chamouny	Cassis, Bell Village, Camp Chapelon, Pailles, Soreze, Bagatelle, Reduit, Pellegrin, Trianon/Shoprite, Pont Fer, Phoenix, Highlands, Camp Fouquereaux, Wooton, La Vigie, Midlands, Nouvelle France, Pont Colville, Beau Climat, La Flora, Riviere Dragon, Britannia, Tyack, Riviere des Anguilles, Union Ducray, St Aubin, Souillac, Surinam, Belle Vue, Chemin Grenier	NTC
198	Port Louis/Victoria	Mahebourg	Cassis, Bell Village, Camp Chapelon, Pailles, Soreze, Bagatelle, Reduit, Pellegrin, Trianon/Shoprite, Pont Fer, Phoenix, Highlands, Camp Fouquereaux, Wooton, La Vigie, Midlands, Nouvelle France, Union Park, Balisson, Rose Belle, JN Hospital, New Grove, Mare d'Albert, Plaine Magnien, SSR International Airport, Beau Vallon	Individual Operators/UBS
199	Port Louis/Immigration	Terre Rouge	Nicolay, Abercrombie, Ste Croix, Le Hochet, Morcellement Raffray	TBS
200	Port Louis/Victoria	L'Escalier	Cassis, Bell Village, Camp Chapelon, Pailles, Soreze, Bagatelle, Reduit, Pellegrin, Trianon/Shoprite, Pont Fer, Phoenix, Highlands, Camp Fouquereaux, Wooton, La Vigie, Midlands, Nouvelle France, Union Park, Balisson, Rose Belle, JN Hospital, New Grove, Mare d'Albert, Plaine Magnien, Union Vale, Trois Boutiques, Plein Bois	Individual Operators/UBS
203	Port Louis/Immigration	Camp Levieux	La Butte, Plaine Lauzun, GRNW, La Tour Koenig, Montee S, Richelieu, Petite Riviere, Gros Cailloux, Cannot, St Martin, Mont Roches, Roches Brunes	NTC
215	Port Louis/Immigration	Grand Baie (Express)	Quay D, Mer Rouge, Roche Bois, Riche Terre, Jin Fei, Terre Rouge, Calebasses, Pamplemousses, Mapou, Labourdonnais, Forbach, The Vale, Grand Baie La Croisette, Coastal Road	TBS
216	Central Flacq	Lalmatie	Boulet Rouge, Bonne Mere, FUEL, St Julien Village, Branch Road, Krishna Road, Grand Bas Fond	Individual Operators
217	Central Flacq	Poste de Flacq	Constance, Hermitage, La Porte Providence	Individual Operators
218	Central Flacq	Queen Victoria	Boulet Rouge	Individual Operators
219	Curepipe/North	Quatre Bornes	Sivananda Avenue, Floreal, Sadally, Vacoas, Palmerstone, Jumbo Phoenix, Medpoint, Candos, La Louise	NTC
221	Central Flacq	Riviere du Rempart	Plaine des Roches, Petite Retraite, Pont Blanc, Constance	Individual Operators
222	Rose Hill	Riviere du Rempart	Ebene Cybercity, Tribeca Mall, Reduit, MGI, Helvetia, Gentilly, St Pierre, Verdun, Bar le Duc, Alma, Quartier Militaire, Providence, St Julien d'Hotman, Junction Unite, Riche Fond, St Julien Village, Lalmatie, Mission Cross Road, Bon Accueil, Grande Retraite, Bois d'Oiseaux, Petite Retraite, Laventure, Bois Jacquot, Belle Vue Maurel	NTC
222A	Rose Hill	Riviere du Rempart	Ebene Cybercity, Tribeca Mall, Reduit, MGI, Helvetia, Gentilly, St Pierre, Verdun, Bar le Duc, Alma, Quartier Militaire, Providence, St Julien d'Hotman, Junction Unite, Riche Fond, St Julien Village, Lalmatie, Belvedere, Latapie, Bon Accueil, Grande Retraite, Bois d'Oiseaux, Laventure, Bois Jacquot, Belle Vue Maurel	NTC
225	Rose Hill	Camp Levieux	Plaisance, Roches Brunes	UBS
226	Curepipe/North	Riviere du Rempart	Eau Coulee, Couvent St, Wooton, Couacaud, Belle Rive, Valetta, Quartier Militaire, Providence, St Julien d'Hotman, Junction Unite, Riche Fond, St Julien Village, Lalmatie, Mission Cross Road, Bon Accueil, Latapie, Brisee Verdiere, Mare d'Australia, Barlow, Belle Vue Maurel	NTC
226A	Curepipe/North	Riviere du Rempart	Eau Coulee, Couvent St, Wooton, Couacaud, Belle Rive, Valetta, Quartier Militaire, Providence, St Julien d'Hotman, Junction Unite, Riche Fond, St Julien Village, Lalmatie, Mission Cross Road, Bon Accueil, Grande Retraite, Bois d'Oiseaux, Laventure, Bois Jacquot, Amaury, Belle Vue Maurel	NTC
226B	Curepipe/North	Riviere du Rempart	Eau Coulee, Couvent St, Wooton, Couacaud, Belle Rive, Valetta, Quartier Militaire, Providence, St Julien d'Hotman, Junction Unite, Riche Fond, St Julien Village, Lalmatie, Belvedere, Brisee Verdiere, Latapie, Bon Accueil, Grande Retraite, Bois d'Oiseaux, Laventure, Bois Jacquot, Belle Vue Maurel	NTC
227	Port Louis/Immigration	Goodlands	Nicolay, Abercrombie, Ste Croix, Le Hochet, Terre Rouge, La Croisee Mte Longue, Melle Laure, Khoyratty, Calebasses, Pamplemousses, Mahogany Mall/Beau Plan, SSRN Hospital, Morcellement St Andre, Plaine des Papayes, Fond du Sac, The Vale, Petit Raffray, Trois Bras	Individual Operators
228	Pointe aux Piments	St Antoine	Pointe aux Biches, Trou aux Biches, Mont Choisy, Pointe aux Cannoniers, Grand Baie, Pereybere, Bain Boeuf, Cap Malheureux, Pavilion, Petit Raffray, Trois Bras	TBS
229	Rose Hill	Bambous	Plaisance, Roches Brunes, Mont Roches, St Martin, Cannot, La Ferme, Mangues Vert Doux	UBS
231	Pointe aux Cannoniers	St Antoine	Grand Baie, La Croisette, Football Ground, Super U, Sottise, The Vale, Daruty Forest, Trois Bras	TBS
232	Port Louis/Immigration	Bel Air	Nicolay, Abercrombie, Ste Croix, Le Hochet, Terre Rouge, La Croisee Mte Longue, Khoyratty, Ilot, D'Épinay, Grande Rosalie, Ville Bague, Pont Praslin, Mare d'Australia, Brisee Verdiere, Bon Accueil, Mission Cross Road, Lalmatie, St Julien Village, Belle Vue Allendy, Constance, Central Flacq, Boulet Rouge, Bramsthan, Ecroignard, Caroline	Individual Operators
233	Cite Vallijee	Tranquebar	Bell Village, Les Casernes, Dr Jeetoo Hospital, Volcy Pougnet St	UBS
234	Cite Vallijee	Cite Madeleine (Tranquebar)	Bell Village, Les Casernes, Dr Jeetoo Hospital, Volcy Pougnet St, Tranquebar	UBS
235	Port Louis/Immigration	Cite Ilois (Baie du Tombeau)	Quay D, Mer Rouge, Elizabethville, Baie du Tombeau, St Malo	UBS
236	Port Louis/Immigration	Belle Mare	Nicolay, Abercrombie, Ste Croix, Le Hochet, Terre Rouge, Khoyratty, Calebasses, Pamplemousses, Mon Gout, Petite Rosalie, Grande Rosalie, Ville Bague, Pont Praslin, Mare d'Australia, Brisee Verdiere, Bon Accueil, Mission Cross Road, Lalmatie, St Julien, Riche Fond, FUEL, Bonne Mere, Boulet Rouge, Central Flacq, Argy, Mare la Chaux	Individual Operators
237	Vallee des Pretres	Pailles	Carolines, La Croisee Vallee des Pretres, Route des Pamplemousses, Cite Martial, Plaine Verte, Magon St, Boulevard Victoria, Vallee Pitot, Champs de Mars, Tranquebar, Taj Mahal, Dr Jeetoo Hospital, La Butte, Bell Village, Camp Chapelon, Les Guibies, Morcellement Raffray	UBS
238	Port Louis/Immigration	Pailles	Victoria, La Butte, Bell Village, Camp Chapelon, Les Guibies, Morcellement Raffray	UBS
239	Rose Hill	Camp Levieux	Ambrose, Beau Bassin, Maingard, Barkkly, Mont Roches, Roches Brunes	RHT
242	Curepipe/North	Petite Riviere	Floreal, Cite Mangalkhan, Vacoas, Savoy, Modern, Bonne Terre, Candos, La Louise, Quatre Bornes, St Jean, Belle Rose, Rose Hill, Ambrose, Beau Bassin, St John, Chebel, Belle Etoile, Coromandel, Montee S, Richelieu	NTC
243	Quatre Bornes	Chamarel	Same route as Route 5A	Individual Operators/NTC
245	Port Louis/Victoria	Camp Diable	Cassis, Bell Village, Camp Chapelon, Pailles, Soreze, Bagatelle, Reduit, Pellegrin, Trianon/Shoprite, Pont Fer, Phoenix, Highlands, Camp Fouquereaux, Wooton, La Vigie, Midlands, Nouvelle France, Pont Colville, Beau Climat, La Flora, Riviere Dragon, Britannia, Tyack, Riviere des Anguilles, Batimarais, St Amand, Chateau Benares	NTC
246	Port Louis/Victoria	Bois Cheri	Cassis, Bell Village, Camp Chapelon, Pailles, Soreze, Bagatelle, Reduit, Pellegrin, Trianon/Shoprite, Pont Fer, Phoenix, Highlands, Camp Fouquereaux, Wooton, La Vigie, Midlands, Nouvelle France, Pont Colville, Beau Climat, La Flora, Grand Bois	NTC
247	Curepipe/North	Cite Anouchka (Seizieme Mille)	Forest Side, Camp Bombaye	UBS
248	Port Louis/Victoria	Riviere du Poste	Cassis, Bell Village, Camp Chapelon, Pailles, Soreze, Bagatelle, Reduit, Pellegrin, Trianon/Shoprite, Pont Fer, Phoenix, Highlands, Camp Fouquereaux, Wooton, La Vigie, Midlands, Nouvelle France, Union Park, Balisson, Rose Belle, JN Hospital, New Grove, Gros Billot, Mare Tabac	Individual Operators
251	Cite Vallijee	Arsenal	Bell Village, La Butte, Les Casernes, Place d'Armes, Louis Pasteur St, Desforges St, Plaine Verte, St Francois Xavier St, Nicolay, Abercrombie, Ste Croix, Le Hochet, Terre Rouge, La Croisee Mte Longue, Melle Laure, Khoyratty, Calebasses	Individual Operators/UBS
252	Curepipe/South	Mahebourg (Express)	La Vigie, Midlands, Nouvelle France, Balisson, Rose Belle, JN Hospital, New Grove, La Rosa, Mare d'Albert, Mon Tresor, Plaine Magnien, La Grotte, Beau Vallon	Individual Operators
253	Cite Vallijee	Baie du Tombeau	Bell Village, La Butte, Les Casernes, Dr Jeetoo Hospital, Labourdonnais St, Pope Hennessy St, Desforges St, Plaine Verte, St Francois Xavier St, Nicolay, Abercrombie, Ste Croix, Riche Terre, Jumbo Riche Terre	UBS
254	Curepipe/North	Rose Hill	Eau Coulee, Castel, Mesnil, St Paul, Phoenix, Pont Fer, Jumbo Phoenix, Trianon/Shoprite, Pellegrin, Ebene Cybercity	UBS
255	Bord Cascades	Rose Hill	Henrietta, Glen Park, Diolle, Cantin, Vacoas, Pont Fer, Jumbo Phoenix, Trianon/Shoprite, Pellegrin, Ebene Cybercity	NTC
256	Cite Vallijee	Plaine Verte	Bell Village, La Butte, Les Casernes, Dr Jeetoo Hospital, Volcy Pougnet St, Tranquebar, Champs de Mars, Vallee Pitot, Eid Gah	UBS
257	Cite Vallijee	Plaine Verte	Bell Village, La Butte, Les Casernes, Dr Jeetoo Hospital, Bangladesh, Tranquebar, Champs de Mars, Boulevard Victoria	UBS

Note:

- All bus routes coming from Le Hochet side (The North) towards Port Louis/Immigration will go via Route des Pamplemousses & Plaine Verte
- All bus routes coming from La Butte side (The South) towards Port Louis/Victoria will go via Souillac St & Lord Kitchener St
- Route 19/89A will go via Route Nicolay while going towards Port Louis/Immigration
- Route 88/117 will go via Route Nicolay while going towards Port Louis/Immigration
- Route 191/191A will go via New Trunk Road while going towards Port Louis/Immigration
- Route 251 will go via Route Nicolay, Cite Laval St, Plaine Verte, Desforges St, Intendance St, Victoria and La Butte towards Cite Vallijee
- Morning Express Bus Routes towards Port Louis/Immigration will operate on normal routes until Terre Rouge Roundabout to Port Louis/Immigration by using New Trunk Road (M2)
- Afternoon/Evening Express Bus Routes from Port Louis/Immigration to the North/Central Flacq will use New Trunk Road (M2) from Port Louis/Immigration to Terre Rouge Roundabout, and therefore they will continue operating on its normal route after reaching Terre Rouge

== Water transport ==
=== Ports and harbours ===
Port Louis is the main port in Mauritius. Port Mathurin is the main port on Rodrigues Island. Mauritius was only accessible by boat until 1922, when the first flight landed in Mauritius.

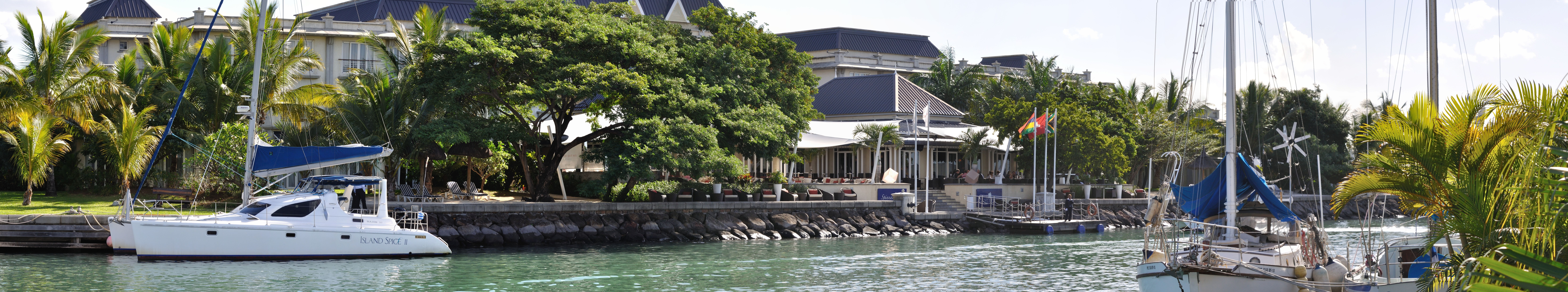
Panorama view of Port Louis (Hotel Le Suffren)

=== Merchant marine ===
total: 8 ships (1,000 GT or over) totalling 550142 GT/90,017 tonnes deadweight (DWT)
ships by type: cargo 2, combination bulk 2, container 2, cargo 2
note: includes some foreign-owned ships registered here as a flag of convenience: Belgium 1, India 3, Norway 1, Switzerland 2 (2002 est.)

== Air transport ==
=== History ===
The first recorded flight taking off from Mauritius was undertaken on 2 June 1922 by Major F.W. Honnet. The plane, a mono-engine biplane, christened Maurice, had come by boat. For the inaugural flight, the land at the Gymkhana, Vacoas was converted into an improvised airport.

On 10 September 1933, two French pilots, Maurice Samat and Paul Louis Lemerle, flew from Reunion Island to Mauritius on a Potez 43 plane called Monique. The pilots landed in Mon-Choisy in the north of the island. On 4 October of the same year, a Mauritian pilot, Jean Hily, took off from Mon-Choisy for Réunion island. However, he never made it and was lost at sea. For some years that followed, the Mon-Choisy strip was used as an airport for the rare airplanes that landed on the island. However, in 1942, with the entry of Japan into the Second World War, the island gained a strategic importance in the Indian Ocean and thus the British government hastily built a new airport in the south of the island at Plaisance. On 24 November 1943, the first military airplane, a Dakota of the Royal Air Force (R.A.F) coming from Nairobi with a stopover at Madagascar, landed in Plaisance.

In 1945, with the end of the war, the airport was opened to the civil aviation. Thus, on 10 February of that year, a Junker 52 of the Réseau des Liaisons Aériennes Francaises (R.L.A.F), later known as Air France, landed in Plaisance. Since 1945, the R.L.A.F operated the Paris-Mauritius line. The journey of 6 days and 7 stops included Antananarivo and Reunion island. In 1946, the R.A.F handed over the Plaisance airport to the Mauritian authorities.

Air France became the first commercial aviation company to come to Mauritius. As from 1947, its DC4, transporting 44 passengers, undertook the Paris-Mauritius in 3 days, including night time flight, with 12 stops in between. The following year, the British company SkyWays initiated a weekly flight on the Plaisance-Nairobi line. The introduction of Boeings as from 1961 sensibly reduced the travel time on this line. Even though Mauritius was a British colony, the British Overseas Airways Corporation (B.O.A.C) began to come to Mauritius only from 1962. The Mauritius-London itinerary took 26 hours, with 4 stops. In 1967, a Boeing 707, capable of carrying 160 passengers was introduced on the Paris-Mauritius line, decreasing the travel time to 18 hours.

Initially, Mauritian civil and commercial aviation developed under the impulsion of Rogers & Co Company. The aviation department within Rogers was created by Amédée Maingard on his return from the Second World War. In June 1967, the national company, Air Mauritius was created. The Mauritian government, British Airways, Air France and Air India were the initial stakeholders in this initiative, with Rogers an active supporter. Amédée Maingard became the first president of Air Mauritius and Jean Ribet the general manager. In December 1972, Air Mauritius landed a Piper-Navajo (twin-engined plane of 6 places), rented from Air Madagascar, in Rodrigues. Then, as from 1975, a Havilland Twin Otter of 16 places was used on the Mauritius-Rodrigues route.

=== Airports ===
As of 2014, there are 2 airports in Mauritius and its dependencies.

Runways and length	Number	Airport(s)
Paved, over 3,047 meters	1	Sir Seewoosagur Ramgoolam International Airport, Plaine Magnien
Paved, 914 to 1,523 meters	1	Plaine Corail Airport, Plaine Corail, Rodrigues Island

== See also ==
- Rail transport in Mauritius
- Air Mauritius – national airline
