= Flacq District =

Coordinates: 20°14′S 57°43′E

Flacq
- District
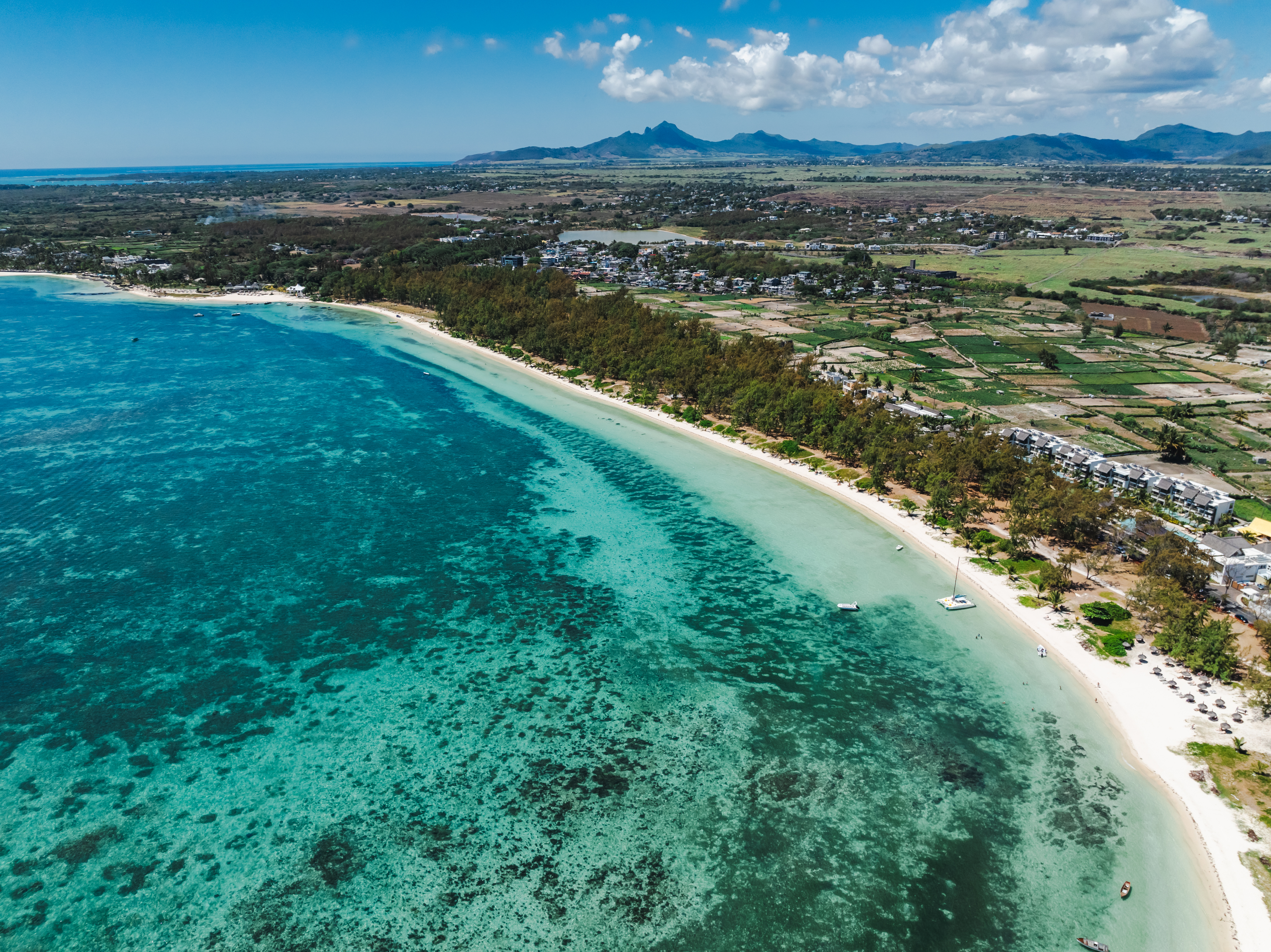
- Belle Mare

- Map of Mauritius island with Flacq District highlighted
- Country: Mauritius

Government

Area
  - Total: 297.9 km^{2} (115.0 sq mi)

Population (2015)
  - Total: 138,460
  - Rank: 2nd in Mauritius
  - Density: 464.8/km^{2} (1,204/sq mi)
- Time zone: UTC+4 (MUT)
- ISO 3166 code: MU-FL (Flacq)

Flacq (Mauritian Creole pronunciation: [flak]) is a district of Mauritius, situated in the east of the island. It is the country's largest district by geographical area, covering 297.9 km^{2}. The population estimate is 138,221 (31 December 2022).

== Etymology ==
Flacq comes from the Dutch word vlak, meaning flat. This is a reference to the area's topography and results from the historical Dutch occupation of the island.

== History ==
Main page: Mauritius.

During the 17th and 18th centuries, Flacq was governed by Dutch colonizers, who settled in the area and utilized the land for farming and gardening due to its valuable soil. The Dutch occupation of the island spanned from 1598-1710, with the first permanent settlement attempted in 1638. During the Dutch occupation, Flacq was divided into eight townships. In 1886, the island was divided into nine administrative regions, the geographical borders of which survived several federal rule changes and are now the Districts of Mauritius.

== Geography ==
Flacq is located in the northeast section of the island and is an overwhelmingly rural district. The coast is surrounded by coral reefs and has a tropical climate during the summer months of October to March, changing to a subtropical climate during the winter months of June to September. Flacq holds jurisdiction over several small islands near the coast, including Ilot Mangenie, Île aux Cerfs, and Île Camisard. The islands and nearby coast are popular tourist destinations, known for their beaches and golf courses.

The capital of Flacq is Centre de Flacq, which is located in the central northern area of the district.

== Government and Politics ==
=== District governance and structure ===
Flacq is governed by the District Council of Flacq, which was formed under the Local Government Act of 2011. It is headed by a Chief Executive with the assistance of a Deputy Chief Executive. The Chief Executive is responsible for the Administration.

The Chairperson is responsible for the council, assisted by a Vice Chairperson.

Assistant Chief Executives of The District Council oversee the 23 Village Councils representing the 23 Village Council Areas (VCAs) within Flacq's borders. Each Village Council has nine elected councilors and one representative at the District Council (with the exception of three village councils that have two representatives).

The District Council (as well as all other local authorities in Mauritius) is governed by the Local Government Ministry.

=== Government activities ===
The government has departments of Administration, Public Infrastructure, Land Use and Planning, Public Health, Finance, and Welfare. These individual departments are overseen by Heads of Departments. Some departments are divided into Sections, which are overseen by Heads of Sections.

==== Central Administration (Administration Department) ====
This department contains the following:

- Human Resource Management Section
- Occupational Health and Safety Section
- Internal Audit Section
- Information Technology Section
- Procurement Section
- Local Disaster Management Coordinator
- Risk Management, Citizen-Oriented Initiatives and Good Governance

==== Public Infrastructure Department ====
This department contains the following:

- Planning Section
- Road Maintenance Section
- Workshop Section
- Lighting Section

==== Land Use and Planning Department ====
Management of this department includes the following positions:

- Planning and Development Officer
  - Planning and Development Assistants
  - Planning and Development Inspectors
- Building Inspector
  - Assistant Building Inspectors
- Office Management Assistant

==== Public Health Department ====
The Public Health Department provides several services that are intended to promote the health of the citizens of Flacq. This department is responsible for the following:

- Refuse collection
- Safety and wellness embellishments
  - Examples include public seating areas, safety fencing, murals, and gardening.
- Governing local markets selling food and general retail
- Environmental safety management
  - Examples include vermin control, environmental management to reduce breeding grounds for mosquitos that carry disease, and herbicide application
- Cemeteries, cremation grounds, and crematoriums
- Traffic center safety
- Business Registration Cards
  - Prevention of illegal trade and institution of trade fees
- Prosecution of regulations, acts, and statues relating to the above services

==== Finance Department ====
The finance department is composed of five sections: Income, Examination, Expenditure, Payroll, and Stores.

==== Welfare Department ====
The Welfare Department has objectives rather than responsibilities. These objectives are to create greater awareness about social realities so as to help people to live more fully and effectively, encourage community participation, maintain and upgrade public facilities, and improve the general community welfare. Some objectives include organizing religious celebrations, coordinating activities for senior citizens, children, and the disabled, developing social and cultural programs, coordinating education and medical clinics for women, and providing financial assistance to citizens who are victims of unfortunate circumstances such as house fires and other disasters.

=== List of VCAs (sorted alphabetically) ===
- Bel Air
- Bon Accueil
- Brisée Verdiere
- Bramsthan
- Camp de Masque
- Camp de Masque Pavé
- Camp Ithier
- Central Flacq (main village)
- Clemencia
- Ecroignard
- Grand River South East
- Grande Retraite
- Lallmatie
- Laventure
- Mare La Chaux
- Medine
- Olivia
- Poste de Flacq
- Quatre Cocos
- Queen Victoria
- Saint Julien Village
- Sebastopol
- Trou D’Eau Douce

== Economy ==
The economy of Flacq is powered primarily by sugarcane agriculture and tourism on the coast and islands.

== Places of interest ==
- In the small village of Trou d'Eau Douce, visitors can take boats for tours of Île aux Cerfs island.

Places by population, area and density
Place	Population	Area in km^{2}	Population density per km^{2}
Bel Air Rivière Sèche	17,605	18.15	970
Centre de Flacq	15,791	20.27	779
Lallmatie (West in Moka district)	10,387	8.92	1,164.5
Bon Accueil	6,203	4.38	1,416.2
Brisée Verdière (North in Rivière du Rempart district)	7,512	15.58	482.2
Camp de Masque Pavé	4,260	10.38	410.4
Camp de Masque	2,720	2.87	947.7
Camp Ithier	4,269	5.52	773.4
Clémencia	1,825	16.04	113.8
Écroignard	6,189	3.81	1,624.4
Grand River South-East	2,107	9.26	227.5
Laventure	5,995	14.39	416.6
Mare La Chaux	1,925	1.53	1,258.2
Médine Camp de Masque (West in Moka district)	7,116	9.27	767.6
Olivia, Mauritius	3,667	24.58	149.2
Poste de Flacq	8,454	28.32	298.5
Quatre Cocos	5,872	15.21	386.1
Quatre Soeurs	3,317	5.01	662.1
Queen Victoria	2,898	20.69	140.1
Sébastopol	5,553	25.34	219.1
St Julien (Haut de Flacq) (West in Moka district)	2,676	16.98	157.6
St Julien D'Hotman (West in Moka district)	3,361	7.17	468.8
Trou D'Eau Douce	5,672	11.08	511.9

== See also ==
- Districts of Mauritius
- List of places in Mauritius
