= Lallmatie =

- Village
- Lallmatie
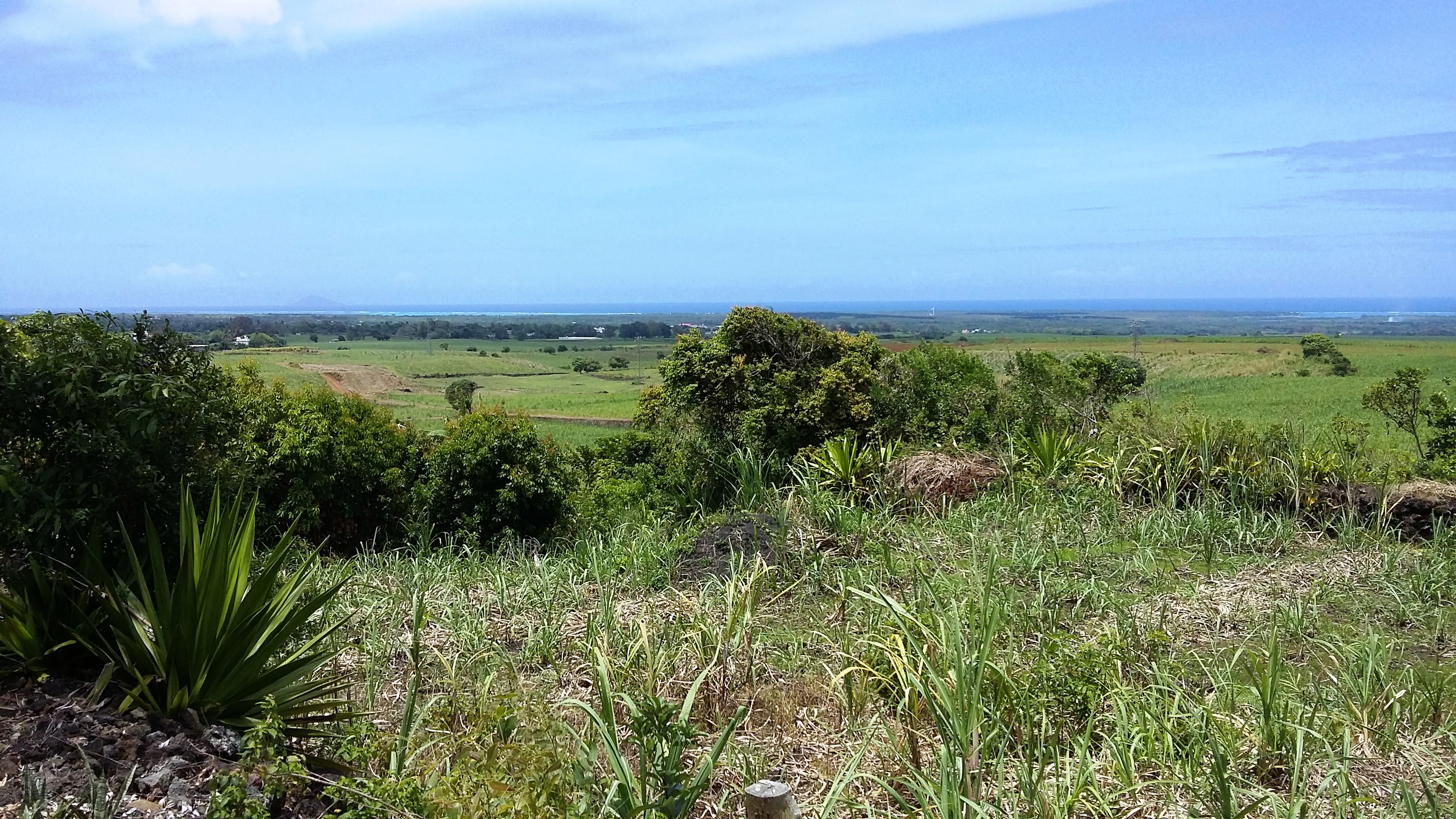
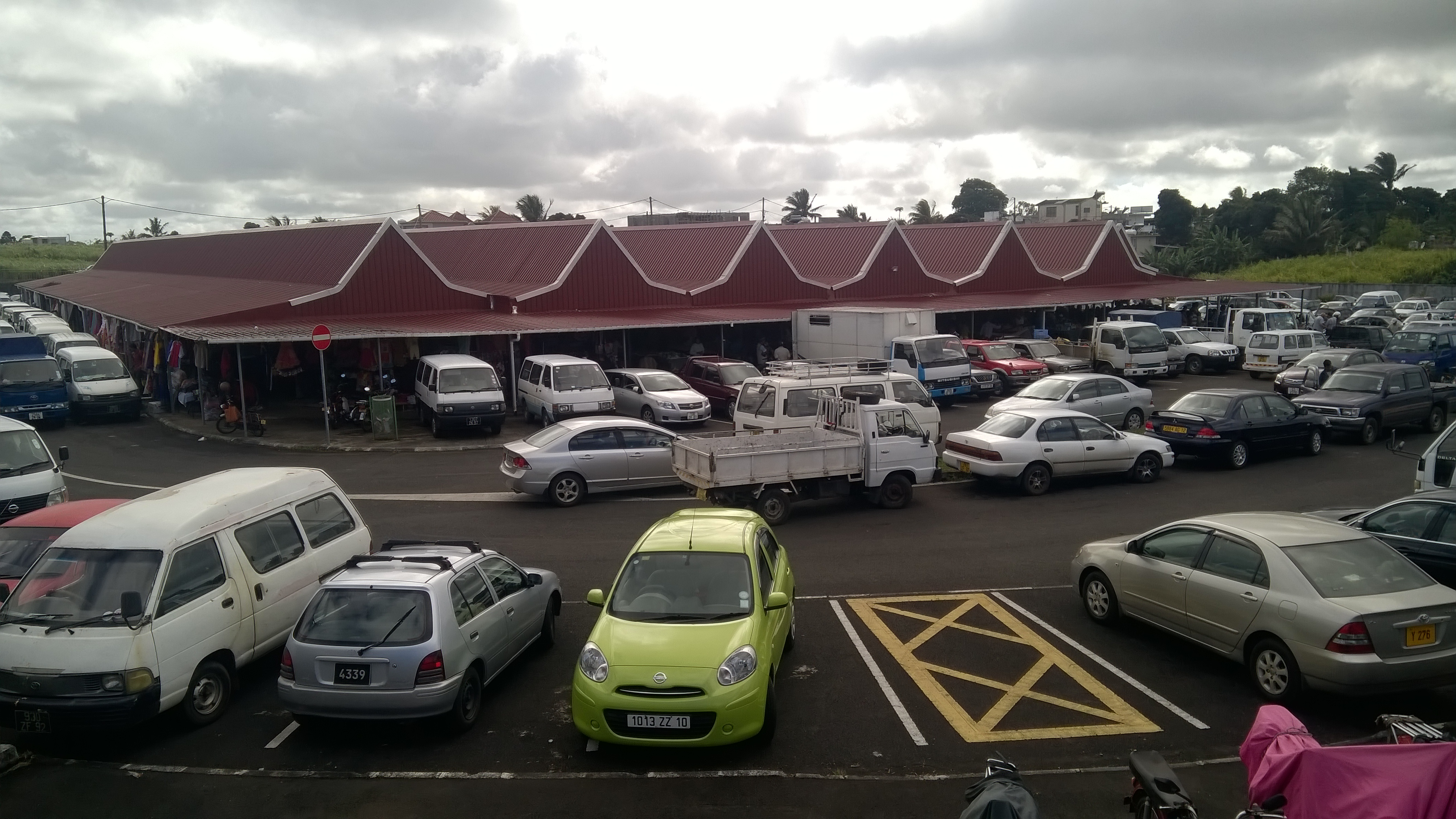
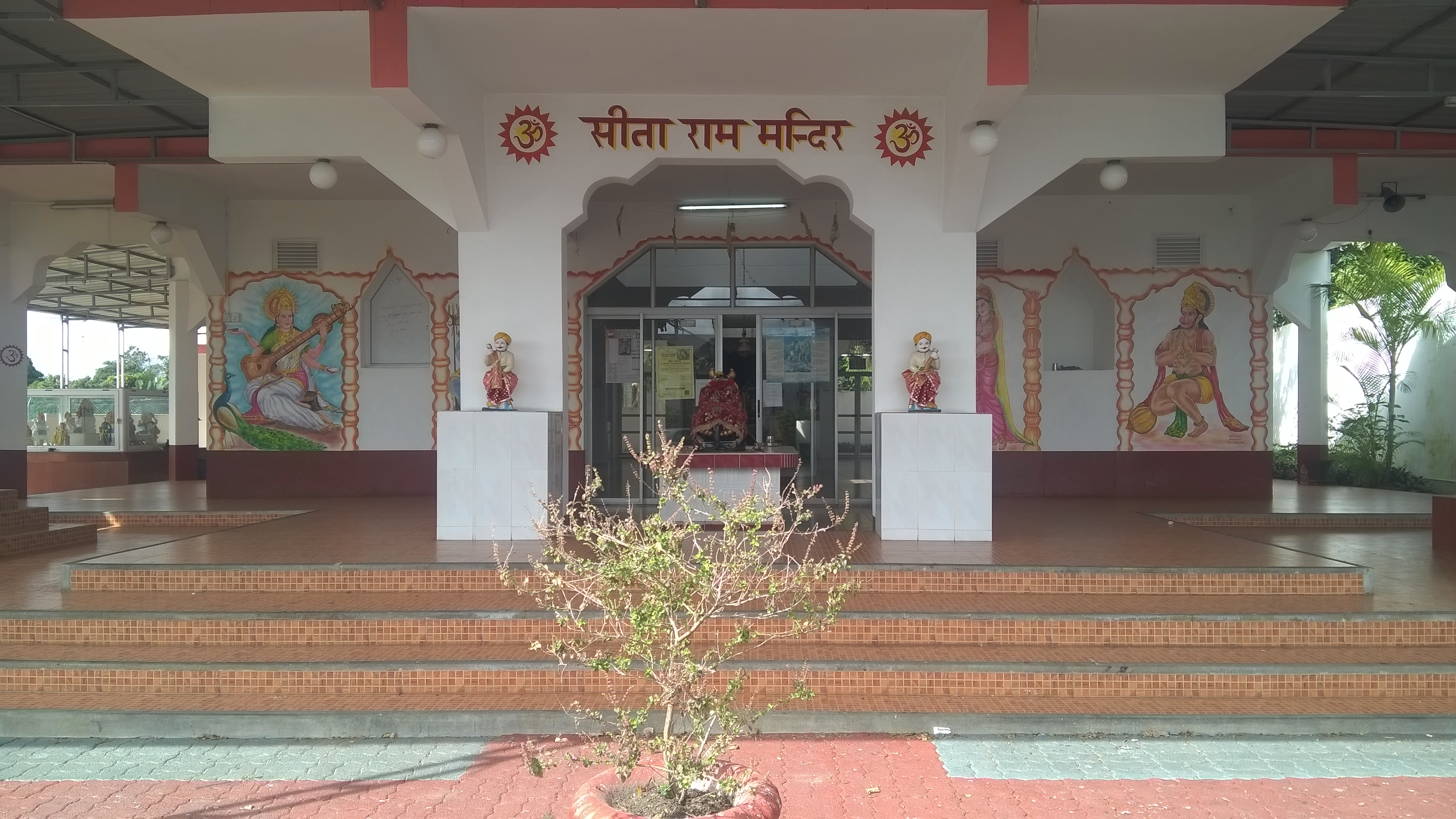
- Sugarcane landscape in Giroday Road, The National Market of Lallmatie and The Hindu Temple of Lallmatie.
- Interactive map of Lallmatie
- Coordinates: 20°1′6.22″S 57°34′48.62″E
- Country: Mauritius
- Districts: Flacq District

Population (2011)
  - Total: 11,910
  - Density: 793.5/km^{2} (2,055/sq mi)
- Time zone: UTC+4 (MUT)
- Area code: 230
- ISO 3166 code: MU
- Climate: Af

Lallmatie is a village in Mauritius located in the western part of Flacq District. It occupies a latitude around -20.1897222 and a longitude around 57.6611111. It has a density of 793.5/km2 (2,055/sq mi) and a total population of around 11,910 inhabitants. Lallmatie is one of the most developed villages in Mauritius and has wide natural resources which include vast sugarcane fields, dense forests and rivers.

The village is sub divided into three plots—which include the Metropolitan area known as Royal Road Lallmatie—the residential area and—the flora and fauna area known as Giroday Road Lallmatie which consists of forest, sugar cane field and waterfall.

Christianity, Catholic, Islam are practiced by Lallmatian but the most dominating religion is Hinduism, around 83% of Lallmatian are Hindu Mauritian. The official language are English and French which is used for administration while Mauritian Creole is highly used for communication, but some inhabitants also speak their vernacular languages which include French, Mauritian Creole, English and Bhojpuri.

Lallmatie has one secondary institution named Manilal Doctor State Secondary School which is a girl state college and two primary institutions called Jawaharlall Nehru Government School and Sookdeo Bissoondoyal Government School. The primary source of transportation of the village are bus and taxi.

== See also ==
- Districts of Mauritius
- List of places in Mauritius
