= Île aux Cerfs =

Island in Mauritius

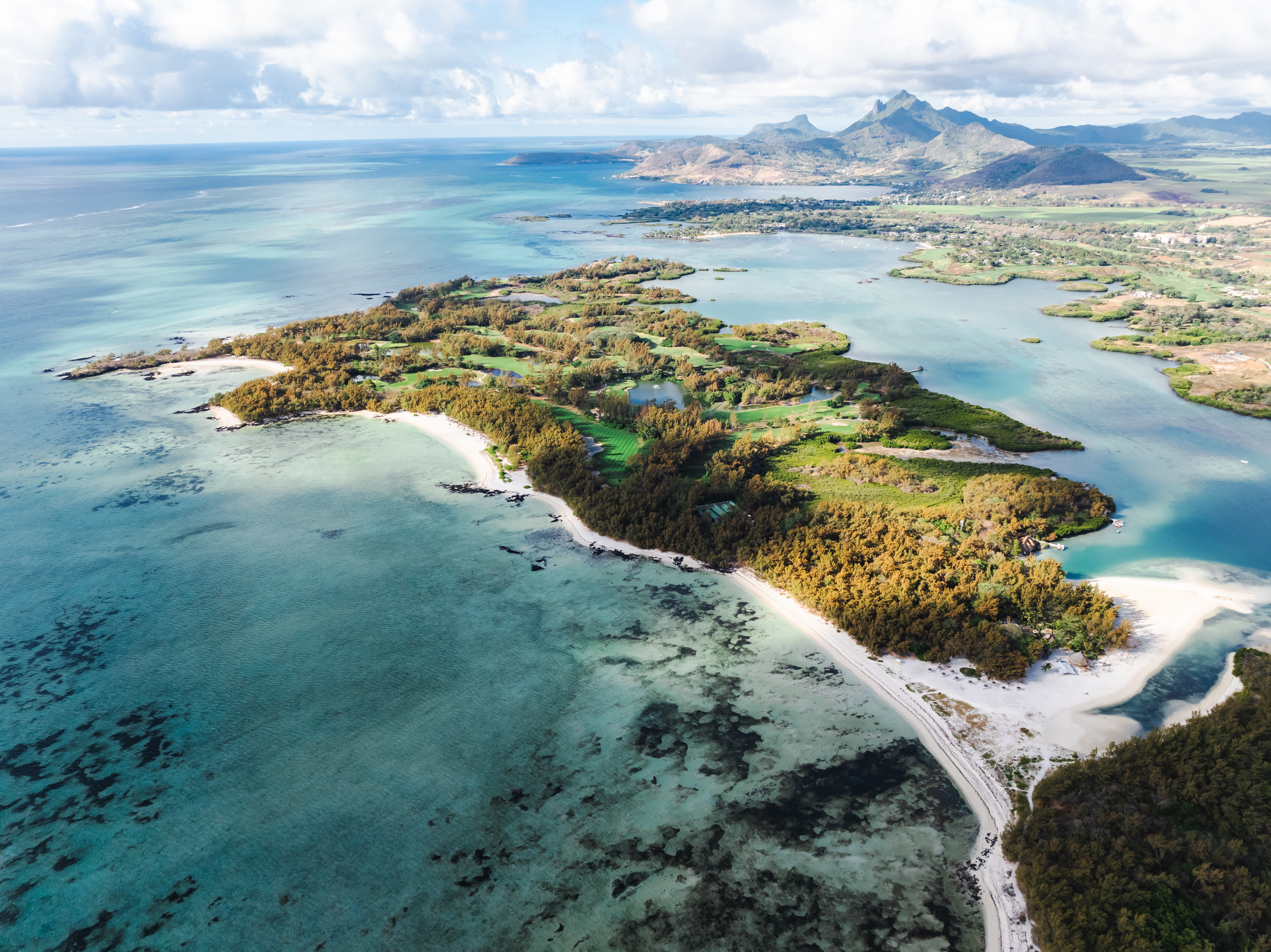

- Location in Mauritius

Geography
- Location: East coast of Mauritius
- Coordinates: 20°16′20″S 57°48′15″E

Administration
- Mauritius

Demographics
- Population: Uninhabited

Île aux Cerfs ('Deer Island') is a privately owned island near the east coast of Mauritius in the Flacq District. The island contains Ile Aux Cerfs Golf Club.
