= Metro Express (Mauritius) =

Light rail transport system in Mauritius

Metro Express Ltd
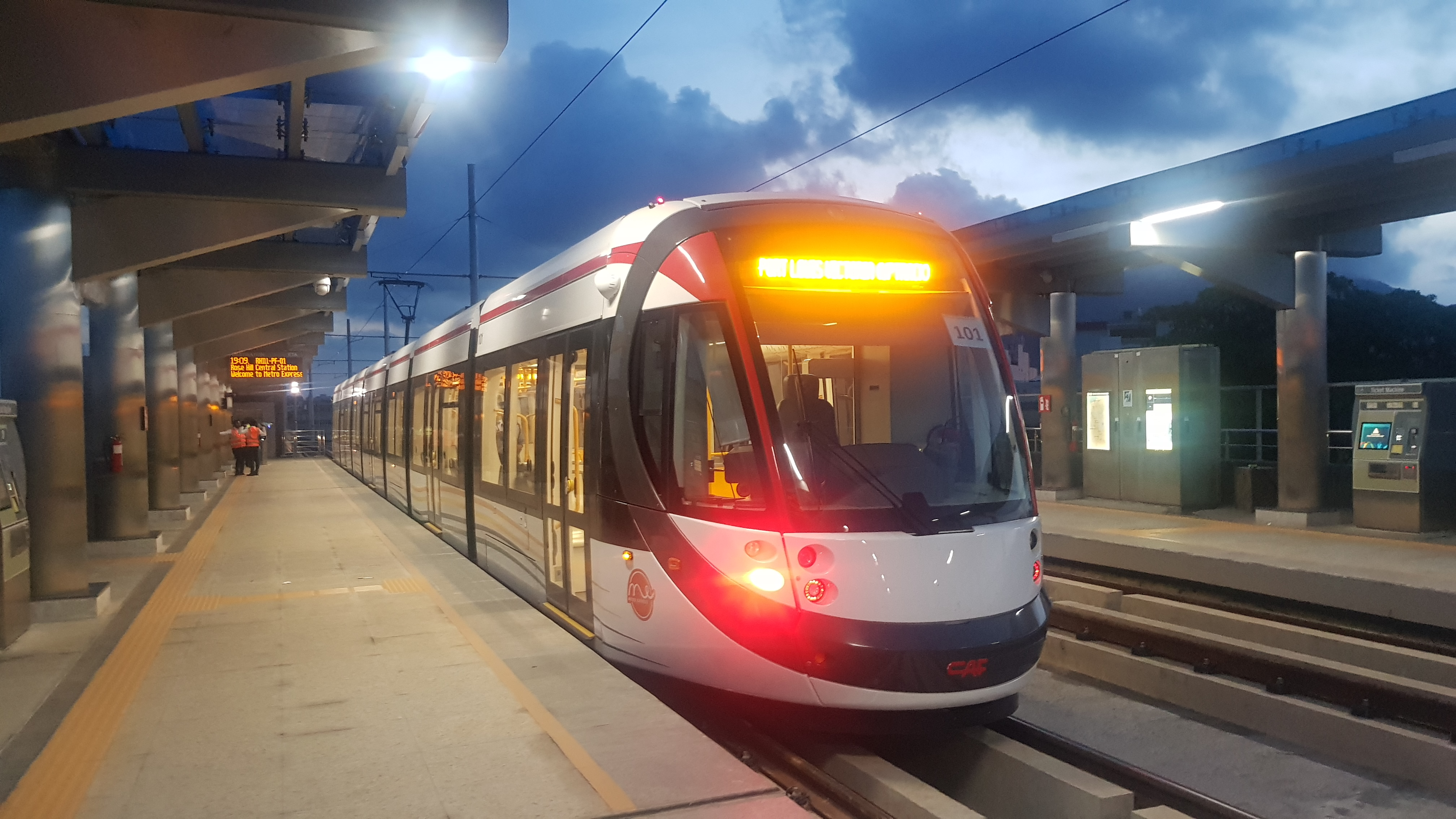
- An Urbos 100-3 at Rose Hill Central Station

Overview
- Status: Operational
- Locale: Mauritius
- Termini: Port Louis; Curepipe
- Stations: 22
- Website: mauritiusmetroexpress.mu

Service
- Type: Light rail
- Services: 2
- Operator: Metro Express Ltd
- Depot: Richelieu
- Rolling stock: CAF Urbos 100-3
- Daily ridership: 55,000

History
- Opened: Phase 1: 2 October 2019 (soft launch); 10 January 2020 (commercial launch); Phase 2A: 20 June 2021; Phase 2B: 10 October 2022

Technical
- Line length: 30 km (19 mi)
- Number of tracks: 2
- Track gauge: 1,435 mm (4 ft 8 1/2 in) standard gauge
- Electrification: 750 V DC overhead lines
- Operating speed: 35-80 km/h
Route map
All stations are accessible
All stations are equipped
with bicycle racks
Park and ride location

The Metro Express is a light rail public transport system in Mauritius which runs between the capital Port Louis in the district of the same name and the cities of the Plaines Wilhems District, with an additional branch running between the city of Rose Hill and the University of Mauritius at Réduit.

== History ==
Mauritius had been without a railway system following the closure of Mauritius Government Railways in the 1950s. The last passenger train ran on 31 March 1956, between Port Louis and Curepipe.

Due to increased car usage and chronic road congestion, plans for a light railway system had been proposed for many years. The idea of introducing Light Rail Transit was first floated in the 1970s and started being developed in the 1980s as a way to solve increasing road congestion. The idea only started gaining traction in 1995, when the concept of light rail was formulated. The main argument against it was the cost of system construction. The investment was made in the development of road infrastructure instead, like building new roads and adding new lanes to existing motorways. Busways were considered but were not implemented.

In 2010, during a visit to Singapore, the Prime Minister of Mauritius Navin Ramgoolam signed an intergovernmental agreement, under which the Singapore Cooperative Enterprise would assist Mauritius in preparing a request for a proposal document to be launched to potential developers. A delegation from SMRT Corporation was in Mauritius in March 2011 to study the possibilities of introducing the LRT system. In September 2012 the Government of Mauritius signed a contract with the Singapore Cooperative Enterprise, valued at around Rs 180 million ($6 million as of September 2012), for the determination of a feasible alignment of the light rail line, development of reference design and consideration of potential future line extension.

In December 2016, Sir Anerood Jugnauth gave the green light for the implementation of the Metro Express Project because of mitigating the rising cost of traffic congestion.

On 31 July 2017, in Ebene the Government of Mauritius signed a contract for the creation of a light rail transit system.

The project is led by the Indian company Larsen & Toubro, after winning a tender from the Government of Mauritius for Rs 18.8 billion (₹3,375 crores (₹33.75 billion); $557 million as of September 2017), of which Rs 9.9bn ($293M as of September 2017) is being provided by a grant from the Government of India.

A launching ceremony by the Prime Minister of Mauritius, Pravind Jugnauth was held on 10 March 2017 at Caudan Old Train Depot. On 28 September 2017 groundbreaking and laying foundation ceremonies were held.

The project, 26 km long, is being implemented in multiple phases: Phase 1: Port Louis Victoria to Rose Hill Central (commercial operation started 10 January 2019), Phase 2A: Port Louis Victoria to Quatre Bornes Central (operation started in June 2021), Phase 2B: Port Louis Victoria to Curepipe Central (operation started in October 2022).

The first phase of the project was inaugurated on 3 October 2019 by Pravind Jugnauth, Prime Minister of Mauritius, and Narendra Modi, Prime Minister of India.

Various partners are involved in the project. The Singapore Cooperation Enterprise (SCE) was engaged to produce the reference design and currently act as a consultant on the delivery of the project. The Engineering-Procurement-Construction (EPC) contract was awarded to Larsen & Toubro (L&T), India in 2017, which is the main contractor on this project. RITES Ltd, a Government of India engineering consultancy company, currently acts in a supervisory role to ensure the quality and timely delivery of the project. The help of SMRT Corporation, Singapore has been retained to help MEL prepare for operational readiness for both Phase 1 and Phase 2. The light rail vehicles (LRVs) for this Project are from Construcciones y Auxiliar de Ferrocarriles (CAF), Spain. CAF furnished 18 LRV URBOS 100 3rd Generation.

On 17 December 2019, Metro Express Ltd, the company running the system, announced that operations would start on 22 December 2019 at 11 am. For the initial period of 15 days, the passengers were carried free of charge on presentation of a free ticket, valid in a given direction and for a given time. The promotional period ended on 10 January 2020.

On 30 March 2021, the first trial run took place on the 3 km (1.9 mi) line extension from Rose Hill Central to Quatre Bornes Central, built as Phase 2A.

On 25 May 2021, the Ministry of Land Transport and Light Rail, Honourable Alan Ganoo announced in parliament the extension of Phase 3: Ebene and Reduit that will allow 15,000 additional passengers to use the light rail vehicles. The works would cost Rs 4.5 billion and the extension would be 3.4 km long, financed by India.

== Construction ==
Phase 1 linked Port Louis to Rose Hill; commercial service started on 10 January 2020. It was originally planned that Phase 2 would extend the line from Rose Hill to Curepipe in September 2021. An intermediate phase, known as Phase 2A consisting of Belle Rose Station and Quatre Bornes Central Station, was opened on 20 June 2021. The target to complete the rest of the line (Phase 2B) was pushed back to the end of 2022, given the COVID-19 pandemic and lockdowns in the country. As of early July 2021, 61% of the work had been completed for Phase 2B and 85% for the whole line.

The scope of the project involves construction. It also includes the installation of advanced signalling systems across the network to ensure integration with road traffic.

Phase 3 will bring major economic development to the country. The multimodal station already integrates several modes of transport and its connection with Phase 3 will generate job creation and will contribute to an increase in economic growth and standard of living.

=== Phase 2b Port Louis Victoria to Aapravasi Ghat ===
During a site visit on 1 July 2021, the Minister of Land Transport and Light Rail, Alan Ganoo announced among others that a new temporary stop, near the Caudan flyover some 300 m (984 ft) down the line from the Port Louis Victoria station, would be built and be in service until the works at Caudan are completed. The works in the area would be conducted between July and December 2021.

Several works are being undertaken by Larsen and Toubro at their own cost. They form most of the ongoing development of the Metro Express project for Phase 2, with an integration element with various infrastructural facilities. They are the upcoming integration works with Victoria Urban Terminal; maintenance and improvement (enabling works) at the Caudan entrance; Le Pouce Railway Bridge; a temporary light rail platform at Waterfront; and a temporary light rail station near Caudan flyover.

These works will collectively enhance the vibrancy, accessibility, and image of the Port Louis Waterfront area. The temporary station has the same facilities as the Port Louis Victoria station and opened on 10 August 2021.

The completion of the section from the Waterfront temporary station to Aapravasi Ghat is subject to ongoing coordination with UNESCO.

=== Phase 2b Quatre Bornes Central to Curepipe Central ===
Phase 2b connecting Quatre Bornes Central to Curepipe Central consists of the construction of approximately 3 km (1.9 mi) of track. Despite two lockdowns, the project is on track and ongoing stakeholder engagement activities with various stakeholders are being carried out. The section from Quatre Bornes Central to Phoenix is expected to be completed by June 2022. The completion of the entire section up to Curepipe Central was scheduled for December 2022.

The Government (Cabinet) approved an agreement between Ascencia and MEL for the construction of an additional station in Phoenix. The Phoenix Mall Station was expected to be operational by mid-2022. Between 4,000 and 5,000 people will use this station daily. Construction will be carried out by L&T.

The Phoenix Mall Station will be integrated with the Phoenix Shopping Mall and will provide direct access to the mall. According to Dr Das Mootanah, Chief Executive Officer of Metro Express Ltd, "The Phoenix Mall Station will be the first station of its kind in Mauritius and will benefit the public as well as MEL and Phoenix Mall. This project will be fully funded by Ascencia for Rs 235 million. It is a true example of a public and private partnership."

== Plans ==
A 3.4 km (2.1 mi) branch from Rose Hill through Ebène to Réduit was planned. Of the 2 planned stations along the branch, one serves the Ebène Cybercity and the other (terminus) — the University of Mauritius, Open University of Mauritius and several other educational establishments, research institutes and state departments. Major structural works on the branch include a 548 m (1,798 ft) long flyover, between the Rose Hill Central elevated station (installed north of the station), and Ebène (in front of the Ebène State Secondary School), and a 120 m (394 ft) long bridge over Cascade River, located next to a disused railway bridge, which is preserved; and the presence of a hydroelectric dam nearby have to be taken into consideration. Its potential ridership was assessed to be 15,000 passengers per day. This leg was planned to be completed by the end of 2022/early 2023.

On 14 July 2021 the CEO of Metro Express Ltd, Das Mootanah announced that the acquisition of land for the Rose Hill to Ebène branch had already started and the company was engaging in dialogue with stakeholders - Réduit, Larsen & Toubro and RITES.

The Ebène and Réduit extension lines and the stations were already recommended in a report by the Singapore Cooperation Enterprise, submitted to the Mauritian authorities in 2016.

== Stations and stops ==
Name	Notes	Coordinates
**Aapravasi Ghat**	Early name: Immigration. Future rail-bus (Immigration Square bus station) interchange.	
Place D'Armes	Temporary station until Aapravasi Ghat station is built	20°09′38″S 57°30′05″E
**Port Louis Victoria**	Rail-bus (Victoria Urban Terminal) interchange.	20°09′45″S 57°29′54″E
St Louis		20°10′50″S 57°28′39″E
Coromandel	Early name: Black River Rd. Park and ride available.	20°11′01″S 57°28′11″E
Barkly	Early name: Nelson Mandela.	20°13′15″S 57°27′30″E
Beau Bassin		20°13′36″S 57°28′03″E
Vandermeersch	Early name: Reverend Lebrun.	20°14′07″S 57°28′23″E
**Rose Hill Central**	Rail-bus interchange, elevated.	20°14′31″S 57°28′33″E
Belle Rose	Early name: Victoria Ave.	20°15′20″S 57°28′40″E
**Quatre Bornes Central**	Rail-bus interchange.	20°15′55″S 57°28′42″E
St Jean		20°15′42″S 57°28′57″E
Trianon		20°15′40″S 57°29′24″E
Phoenix	Park and ride will be available.	20°16′30″S 57°29′48″E
Phoenix Mall		20°16′48″S 57°29′50″E
Palmerstone		20°17′07″S 57°29′50″E
**Vacoas Central**	Future rail-bus interchange. Park and ride will be available.	20°17′42″S 57°29′36″E
Sadally		20°18′07″S 57°29′45″E
Floreal		20°18′27″S 57°30′28″E
Curepipe North		20°18′43″S 57°31′16″E
**Curepipe Central**	Future rail-bus (Jan Palach bus station) interchange, elevated.	20°19′00″S 57°31′32″E
Ebéne Cybercity	Rèduit branch. See § Plans.	20°14′30″S 57°29′14″E
Mahatma Gandhi	Rèduit branch. See § Plans.	20°13′55″S 57°29′55″E
Legend: **Name in bold** – major interchange station Name in grey italic – station or stop planned, location subject to confirmation Name in small font – temporary station, it will be operational until the one it replaces is opened

== Fares ==
As of January 2020 a single adult fare is Rs 30 (82¢ as of January 2020) or Rs 20 (55¢ as of January 2020) if the trip does not involve travelling between Coromandel and Barkly. Children below the age of 3 and eligible senior citizens and disabled people are entitled to free fares. Eligible pupils and students are entitled to free travel to and from school on school days (along a pre-determined route). There are concession fares for children aged between 3 and 12, and pupils and students not qualifying for free fares. The entitlements to free and concession fares on the Metro Express are identical to those on buses.

As of June 2021, after adding two new stations to the line (Phase 2A), a single adult fare for the longest journeys that start or terminate at one of the newly opened stations is Rs 40; the fares for journeys between the other 7 stations (opened as part of Phase 1) remain unchanged.

Single tickets can be purchased using cash or a credit/debit card from ticket machines located at each platform. Regular commuters are encouraged to use the MECard—a contactless, stored-value card that automatically deducts the correct fare by tapping on it before boarding and off after disembarking. The card, loaded with applicable entitlement, is also used by those who are entitled to free fares. The fare paid with the MECard is the same as the cash fare, there are no weekly or monthly passes and there are no through fares for those changing from or to bus services.

== Ridership ==
Upon opening, ridership of the line was on average 17,000 passengers daily, dropping to 10,000 after the COVID-19 pandemic in Mauritius began.

Since the opening of the Quatre Bornes extension (Phase 2A), the total number of passengers increased by 65% in the first week and in the second week of July there were 85% more passengers over the last two days, almost double the usual number noted before the launch of Quatre Bornes. Demographic-wise, 26% of travellers have been over the age of 60 and 71% are between 18 and 60. As of January 2023, the daily ridership was around 55,000 passengers and expected to increase after the opening up of the Réduit line.

== Rolling stock ==
On 26 July 2017, CAF announced that they had won a tender to provide 18 Urbos 100-3 worth over €100 million. The deal also includes providing the signalling system, automatic vehicle location system (AVLS), transit signal priority system (TSPS), depot equipment and a driving simulator.

Each train is bi-directional, consists of seven modules, has five doors (per side), measures 45.411 m (148 ft 11.8 in) (length) by 2.65 m (8 ft 8 in) (width) by 3.25 m (10 ft 8 in) (height), can reach a maximum speed of 70 km/h (43 mph), can carry up to 422 passengers (based on 6 pax/m^{2}) and is equipped with, among others, air-conditioning of both the driver's cab and the passenger saloon, security CCTV and an event recorder.

== Infrastructure and facilities ==
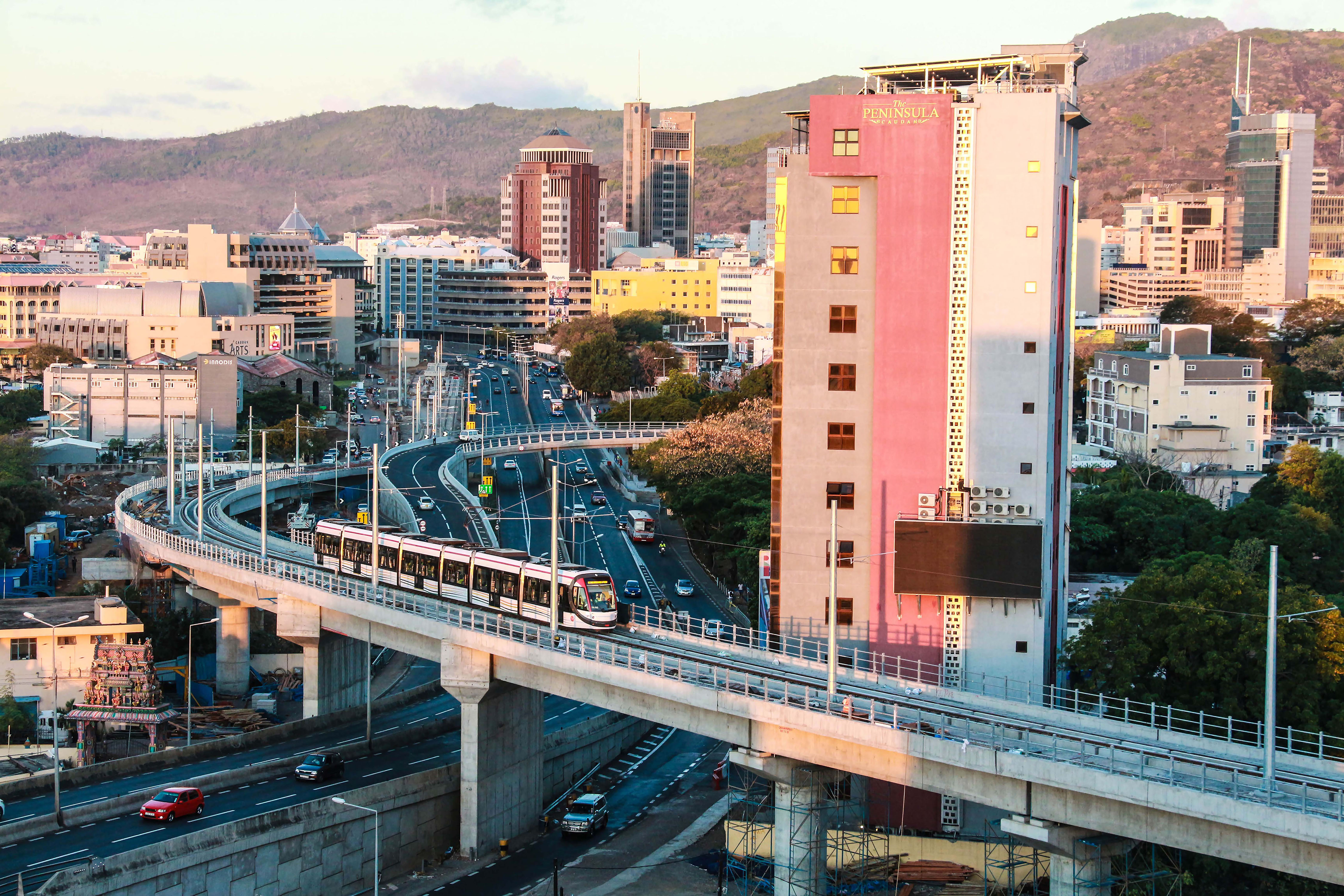
Mauritius Metro LRV, departing Port Louis Victoria for Rose Hill Central, on the Caudan flyover over the M1 motorway

The line largely follows the old Mauritius Government Railways' Midland Line alignment. It is fully grade-separated from major roads and at level crossings with secondary roads (with little vehicular traffic) and pedestrian crossings are equipped with transit signal priority traffic lights. The system was designed so that there would be no on-street running.

Between the end of the Rose Hill flyover and the Barkly station the rails are embedded in concrete, and the space between the rails, as well as between the tracks, is grassed. On the Barkly to Coromandel section, the track is laid on concrete sleepers and ballasted. On the flyover on the approach to Port Louis, the tracks are laid in concrete.

The depot at Richelieu covers an area of approx. 1 km^{2} (0.39 sq mi) and features eight external stabling tracks, a maintenance building, a wash facility and a sanding plant. An office building houses the control centre and staff offices. The maintenance building is equipped with retractable overhead supply rails that, when extended, allow LRVs to move under their power and, when retracted and isolated, allowing safe access to the roof-mounted equipment.

All stations are fully accessible. The minor stations are of simple construction, featuring side platforms (the Vandermeersch station and Belle Rose station feature a single island platform). The elevated Rose Hill Central station is equipped with escalators and lifts. Each station offers bicycle racks. Five stations, namely, Port Louis Victoria, Rose Hill Central, Quatre Bornes Central, Vacoas Central and Curepipe Central are located next to bus stations; the Aapravasi Ghat station will be located next to bus stations as well. There is a park-and-ride facility at Coromandel, and other parking facilities will be built at Phoenix and Vacoas.
