= Islets National Park =

National park in Mauritius

Islets National Park is a national park in Mauritius. The park is made up of eight small islands, the largest being Ile D'Ambre.

Mauritius is surrounded by a total of 49 islets, and aside from the National Park, seven others have been proclaimed as Nature Reserves.

== National Park Islets ==
Île d’Ambre is located north east of Mauritius and is a popular weekend destination for Mauritians. Although the environment of the island is in fairly poor condition, some blue latan palm (Latania loddigesii) and mangrove forests remain.

Île aux Vacaos (Îlot Vacoas), Rocher des Oiseaux, Île aux Fous, and Île aux Fouquets located south east of Mauritius, in the Bay of Grand Port near the town of Mahébourg. Together with the other islands in the bay, these were the site of the Battle of Grand Port in 1810.

Île aux Oiseaux and the Îlot Flamants are located just north of Grand Port and west of Grand Sable.

Pigeon Rock is located next to Île Plate off the north coast of Mauritius.

== Size of Islands ==
Islands or Islets	Area (ha)
Pigeon Rock	0.63
Ile D’Ambre	128.0
Rocher des Oiseaux	0.10
Ile aux Fous	0.30
Ilot Vacoas	1.36
Île aux Fouquets	2.49
Îlot Flamants	0.80
Île aux Oiseaux	0.70

== See also ==
- Islets of Mauritius
