= Cnemaspis aaronbaueri =

Scientific classification
- Kingdom: Animalia
- Phylum: Chordata
- Class: Reptilia
- Order: Squamata
- Suborder: Gekkota
- Family: Gekkonidae
- Genus: Cnemaspis
- Species: C. aaronbaueri

Binomial name
- Cnemaspis aaronbaueri Sayyed, Grismer, Campbell, & Dileepkumar, 2019

Species of lizard

Cnemaspis aaronbaueri is a species of gecko endemic to the Western Ghats of South India. Documented only from tea estates in the state of Kerala, it is named after Aaron Matthew Bauer, a herpetologist and professor of biology at Villanova University. It is a small gecko, with males growing to snout–vent lengths of 34.57 mm (1.361 in) and females reaching lengths of 32.85 mm (1.293 in). Males have greyish dorsums, brownish-yellow heads and necks, and dusky white undersides. Females have brown dorsums, orange heads and necks, and dusky white undersides. Both sexes similar markings on their body, with a yellow Y-shaped pattern on the dorsal surface of the neck, four yellow horizontal stripes on the side of the face, and six pairs of black and pale dots on the back. Juveniles differ from adults in having a brown body, reddish-brown tail, and a pale yellow stripe along the back from the head to the tail.

== Taxonomy ==
Cnemaspis aaronbaueri was formally described in 2019 based on an adult male specimen collected from a tea estate in Thenmala, Kerala. The species is named after Aaron Matthew Bauer, a professor of biology at Villanova University, as a tribute for his work in herpetology. Although previously confused with C. ornata, C. aaronbaueri is actually more closely related to C. agarwali and C. ajijae.

== Description ==
Cnemaspis aaronbaueri is a small gecko, with males growing to snout–vent lengths of 34.57 mm (1.361 in) and females reaching lengths of 32.85 mm (1.293 in). Dorsally, adult males have greyish bodies and tails, contrasting with the brownish-yellow colouration of the head and neck. The side of the head has four yellow horizontal stripes, the uppermost of which stretches to the crown and the second highest of which runs through the eyes onto the occiput. The dorsal surface of the neck has a yellow Y-shaped pattern and several yellowish markings, with an oval-shaped black splotch located where the Y-pattern branches. The eyes are orange with circular, black pupils. The labial scales along the lips are yellow. The neck is separated from the body by a black and white stripe. The dorsal surface of the body from the neck to the hip is marked by six pairs of black dots, each of which is adjacent to a white dot. Some males have a black splotch on their sides. The underside of the head, body, and tail is dusky white. The limbs have white patterning, with black and white spots on the phalanges.

Females differ from males in having an orange head and neck, contrasting with a brown dorsum. The black and yellow spots along the back are bigger and more ovoid than in males. Subadults are broadly similar to females in their colouration. Juveniles differ from adults of both sexes, having a brown body, reddish-brown tail, and a pale yellow stripe along the back from the head to the tail.

== Distribution and habitat ==
Cnemaspis aaronbaueri is endemic to the Indian state of Kerala, where it has only been recorded from tea estates near the village of Thenmala in the Kollam district. Specimens have been collected from stone walls. Vegetation near Thenmala largely consists of tea estates, rubber plantations, and rainforest. Other geckos that co-occur with C. aaronbaueri include C. cf. nairi and Hemidactylus species.
