= Île Plate =

Island off Mauritius

Flat Island
Native name: Île Plate
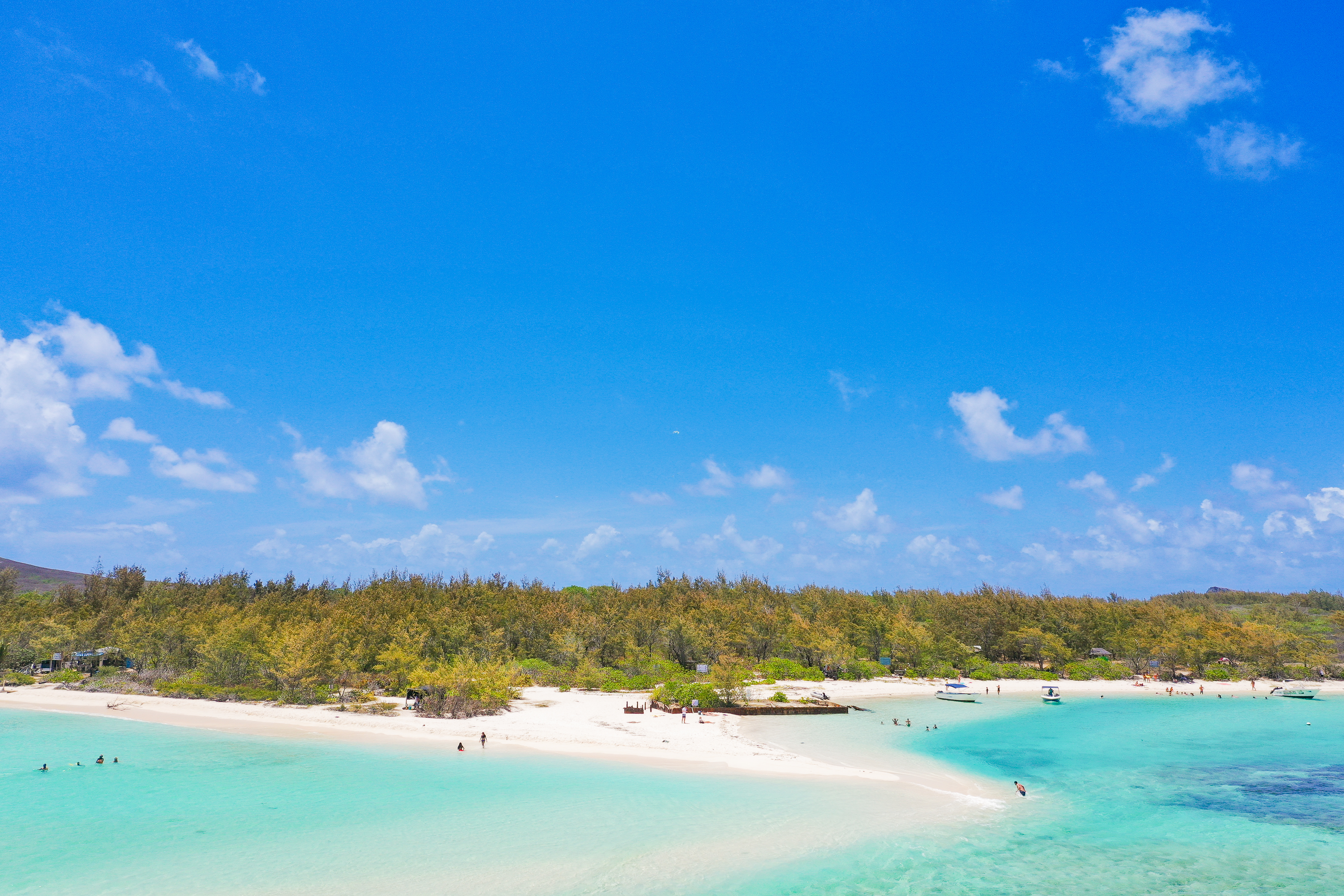

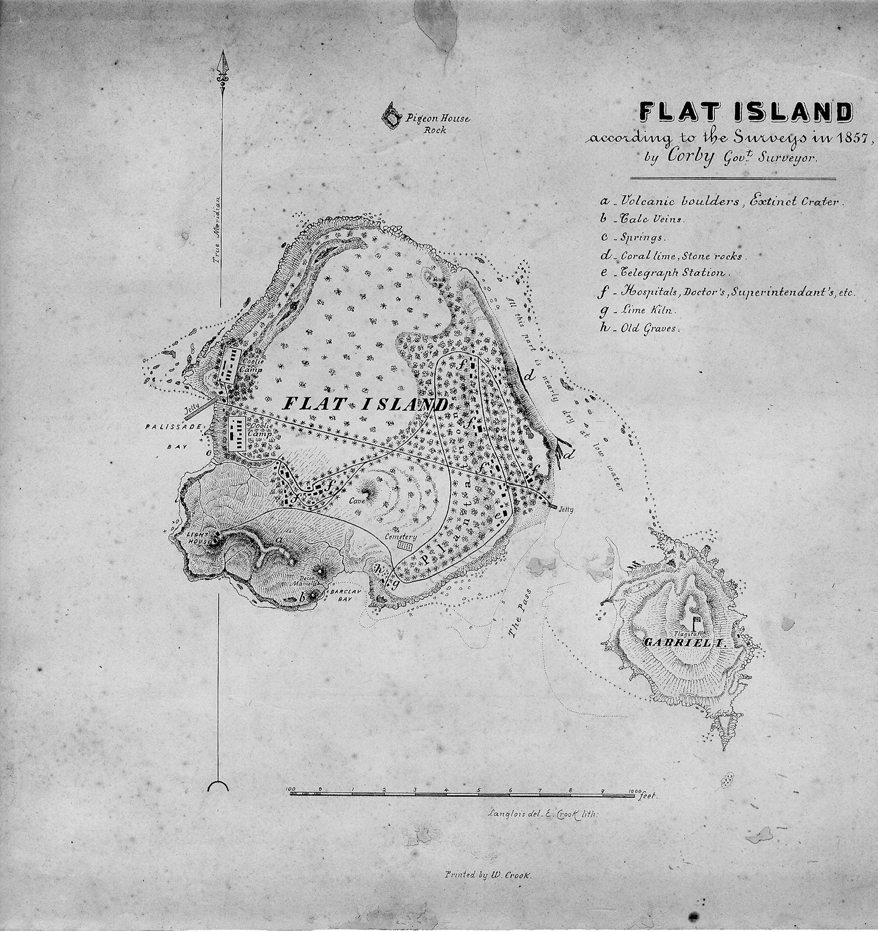
- 1857 map of Île Plate

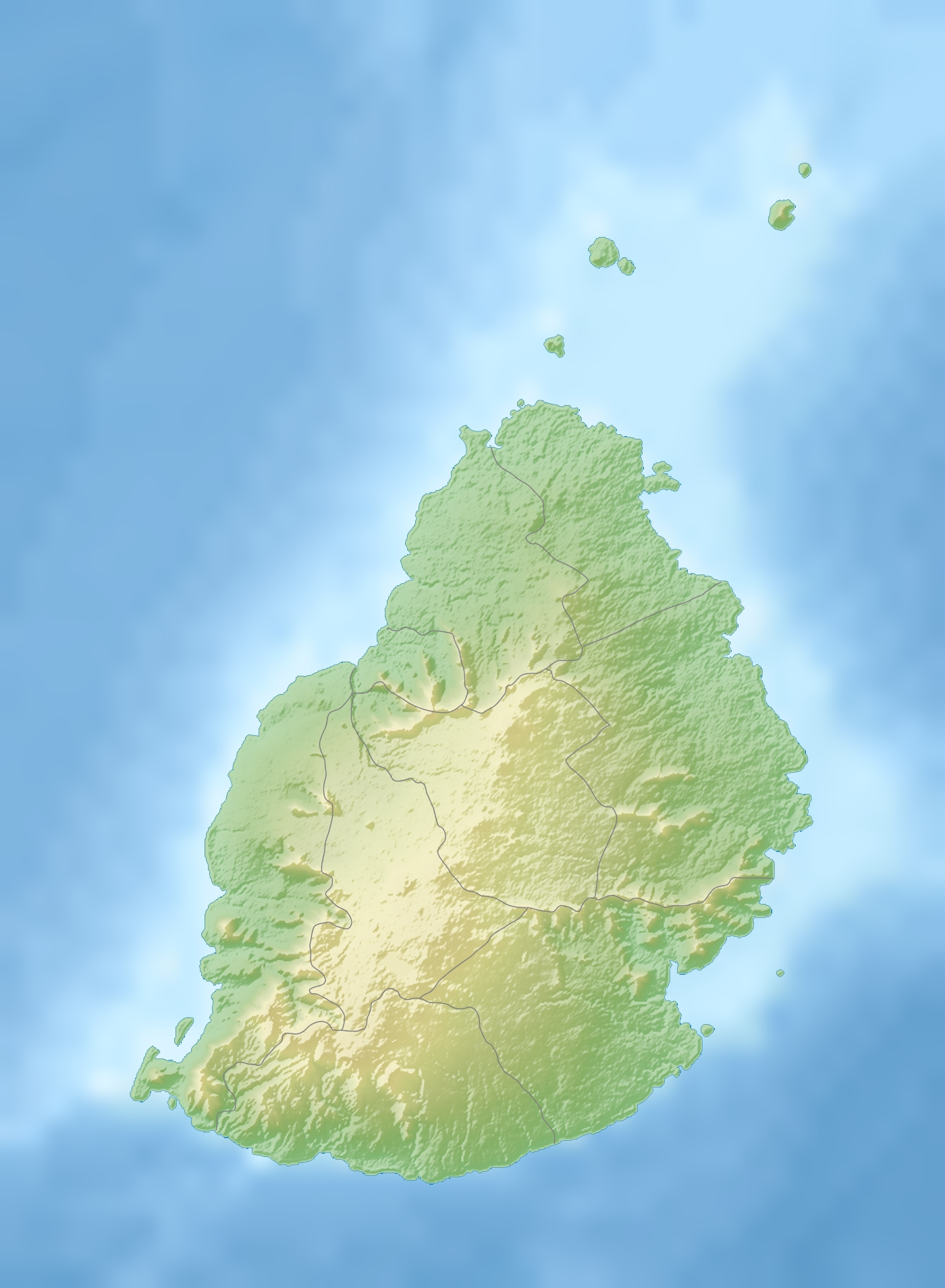
- Flat Island north of main island

Geography
- Location: Indian Ocean
- Coordinates: 19.8797°S 57.668°E
- Area: 2.53 km^{2} (0.98 sq mi)
- Length: 1.9 km (1.18 mi)
- Width: 1.9 km (1.18 mi)
- Highest point: 95

Administration
- Mauritius
- Capital and largest city: Port Louis

Demographics
- Population: 0

Île Plate, also known as Flat Island, is a small island in the Indian Ocean off the north coast of Mauritius.

== Geography ==
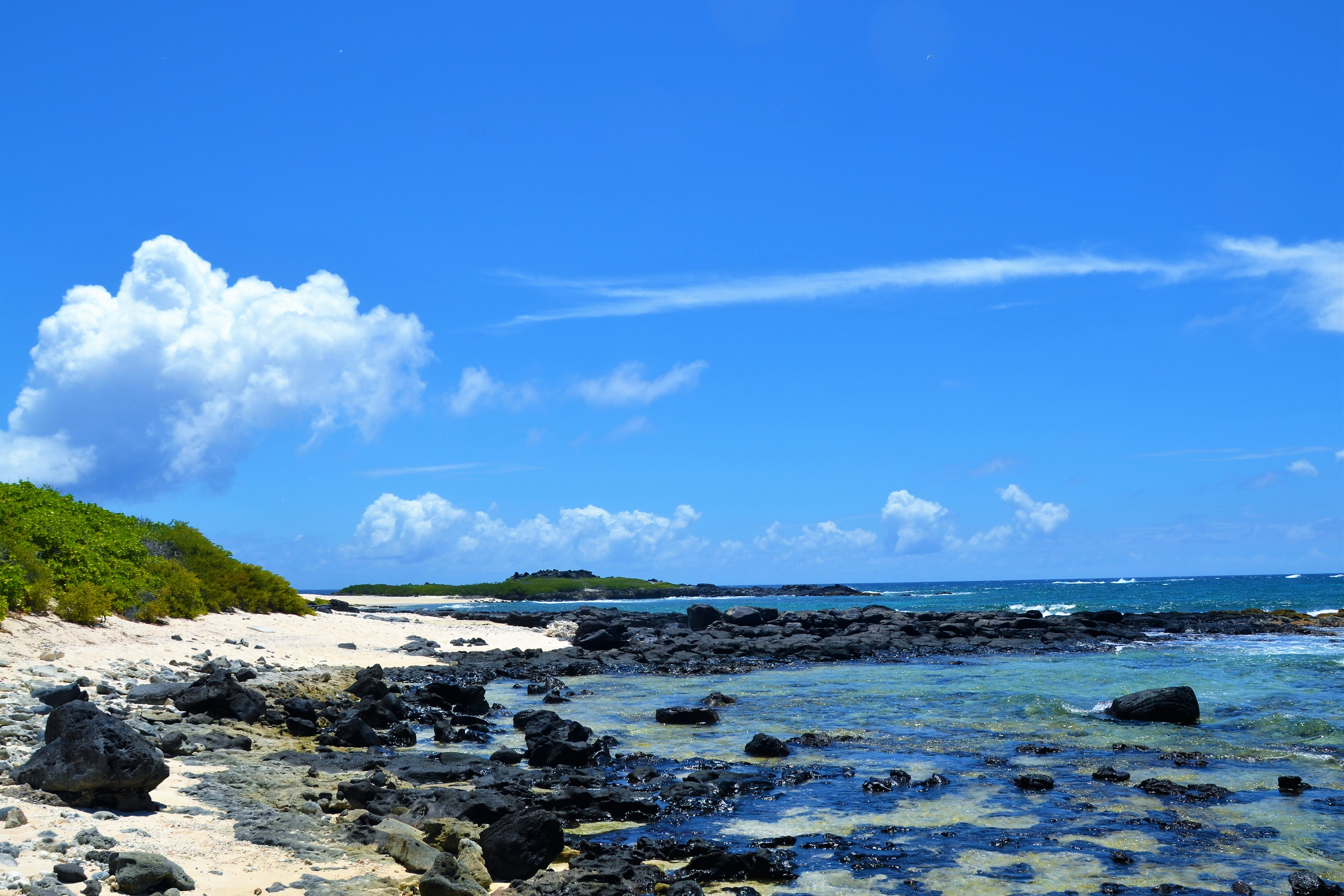
View to Îlot Gabriel from Flat Island

Île Plate is located 11 kilometres (6.8 mi) north of Cap Malheureux, the main island's northernmost point. It is part of the administrative area of Rivière du Rempart District. The small nature reserve of Coin de Mire lies between the two islands.

As its name suggests, Île Plate is low-lying, apart from a bluff, and is in danger of possible submersion due to the historical rise in the sea-level. It covers an area of 2.53 square kilometres (0.98 sq mi). Two small islets, Îlot Gabriel and Pigeon Rock, lie close to the shore of Île Plate. The three sites are national protected areas (Pigeon Rock as part of Islets National Park).

Île Plate is uninhabited, though there is a small army base on the island.

== Flora and fauna ==
A census conducted in 2007/2008 by the University of Mauritius classified 121 species of vascular plants, many of which are non-native. Among the indigenous plants present, the Latania loddigesii, Pandanus vandermeeschii, Psiadia arguta, as well as the reintroduced Dracaena concinna and Aloe tormentorii, imported from the island of Coin de Mire.

The only mammals on the island are three species of bats: the Mauritian flying fox (Pteropus niger), the Mauritius tomb bat (Taphozous mauritianus) and the Natal free-tailed bat (Mormopterus acetabulosus).

Three species of seabirds nest on the island: the Wedge-tailed shearwater (Ardenna pacifica), the Red-tailed Tropicbird(Phaethon Rubricauda) and the White-tailed Tropicbird (Phaethon lepturus). The rich vegetation of the interior of the island combined with the presence of wetlands also favor the nesting of the striated heron (Butorides striata) and occasionally also attract the Whimbrel (Numenius phaeopus), the plover (Pluvialis squatarola) and the Ruddy turnstone(Arenaria interpres). Some exotic species such as the common myna (Acridotheres tristis), the red-whiskered bulbul (Pycnonotus jocosus) and the House sparrow (Passer domesticus) are present.

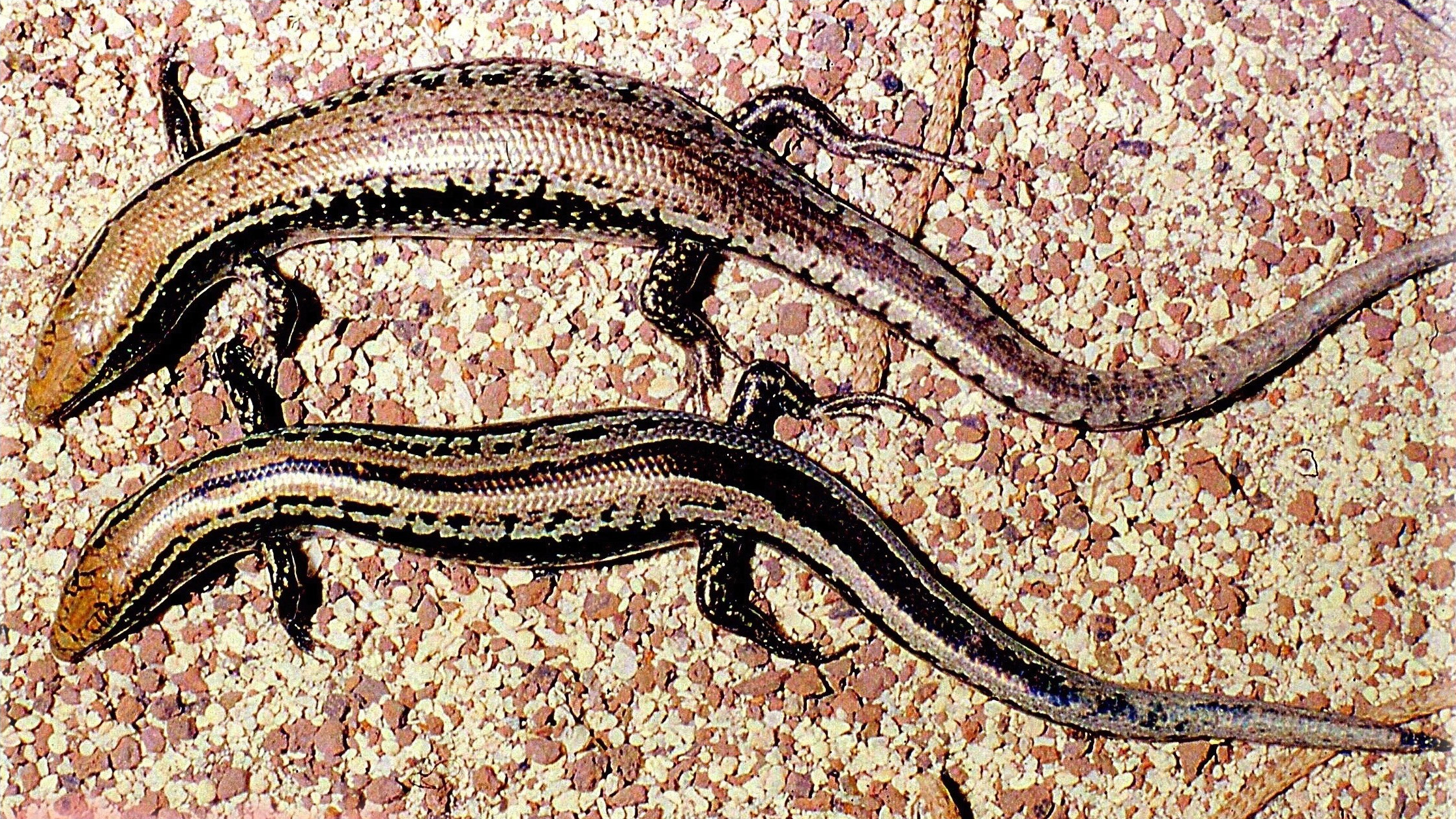
Bojer's skink is native to Flat Island

The island was once home to the largest population of Bojer's skink (Gongylomorphus bojerii), once very common on the island of Mauritius, and now considered critically endangered. The population was decimated following the arrival of the Asian house shrew (Suncus murinus) on the island. Other reptiles present are the Snake-eyed skink (Cryptoblepharus boutonii), the Ornate day gecko(Phelsuma ornata) and the Lesser night gecko (Nactus coindemirensis). Three exotic species have also been introduced to the island: the geckos Hemidactylus frenatus, Gehyra mutilata and the fossorial snake Indotyphlops braminus(Typhlopidae).

The black rat (R. rattus) population of Gabriel and Flat Island was eradicated in 1995 and 1998, respectively.

== History ==
Île Plate was approached during the Baudin expedition to Australia on March 15, 1801. Jean-Baptiste Bory de Saint-Vincent described it from aboard the Naturaliste: she is "much lower than the others; a beach of limestone makes it remarkable from afar, and appears with a dazzling white hue; the rest of its rocks are reddish or black". To explain these last colors, he refers to a certain Lilet, an engineer officer, who would have visited the reef and who told him he had found the debris of an ancient crater of volcano.

One of Mauritius's few operating lighthouses, built in 1855, is found on the southwest side of the island.

Flat Island was used as a quarantine station from the mid-19th century to the 1930s. It was reserved for immigrants to Mauritius, mostly indentured labourers, undergoing quarantine for cholera, although it was sometimes used during other epidemic outbreaks such as smallpox and malaria. Infrastructure was built between 1856 and 1870 and included stone and wooden buildings. These buildings comprised living quarters and offices for medical, police, and immigration officials in charge of the quarantine station and barracks for migrants placed in quarantine. Kitchens, stores, toilets, privies, two hospitals, and a distillation plant used for water supply were also constructed. Many of these structures are still preserved, though overgrown. A cemetery located on the southern side of the island is still recognizable for the presence of basalt structures and cairns on the top of some graves.

== Archaeology ==
Since 2014, Project MACH (Mauritian Archaeology and Cultural Heritage) of Stanford University in the U.S. has been researching the heritage of Flat Island in collaboration with the Aapravasi Ghat Trust Fund and National Parks and Conservation Services of Mauritius. The primary purpose of the project is to document the remaining structures of the quarantine station, and to perform the overall assessment of archaeological potential of the island. The results will form part of a wider restoration and conservation plan to promote the preservation of this important cultural site. The planned archaeological investigation includes detailed surveys of infrastructure, paths, and architectural features pertaining to the quarantine station as well as the cemetery. Over the years, four archaeological campaigns have been performed through intensive survey and execution of test-pits, in particular around the provision store building, one of the hospitals, and one of the camps that hosted the immigrants during quarantine. Also planned are a geophysical survey of subsoil features, environmental sampling for geoarchaeological analysis, and a detailed mapping of the island through the use of a drone.

== Tourism ==
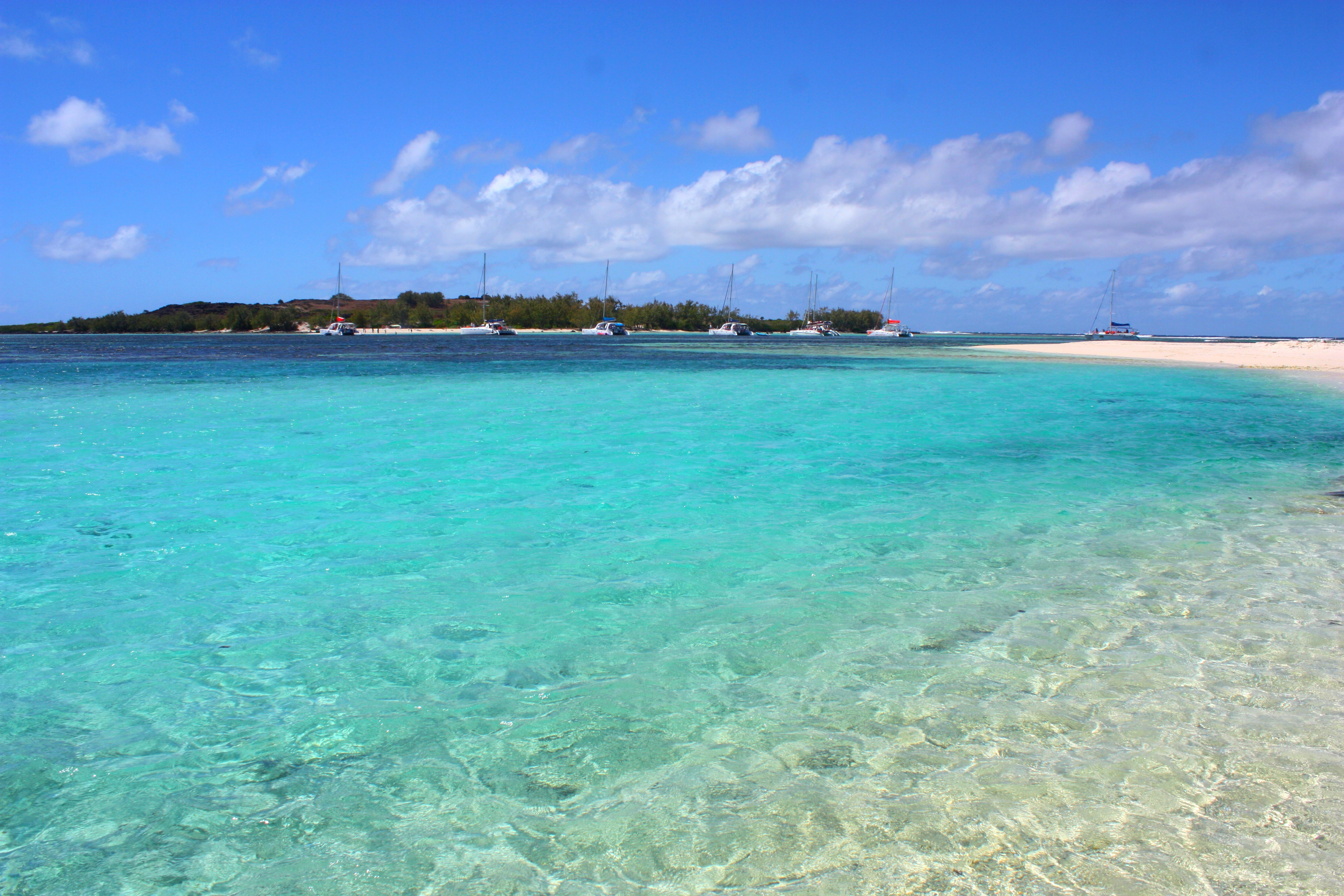
Îlot Gabriel with tourist catamarans from shore of Flat Island

Île Plate is a popular venue for snorkellers, and access to the island is possible via chartered yacht and catamaran. Pigeon Rock harbors an internationally famous dive site called The Shark Pit where divers can witness sharks swirling within the pit for the rich oxygen available due to the crushing waves against the cliffs of Pigeon Rock.

== See also ==
- Islets of Mauritius
