= Petit Bel Air =

Village in Mauritius

Coordinates: 20°24′S 57°42′E

Petit Bel Air is a small village about 2 km north of the town of Mahébourg in south-eastern Mauritius. The population of the village is approximately 1,000.

== Location ==
It lies on the coastal road running roughly south to north from Mahébourg to Flacq. Situated at the mouth of the Riviere des Creoles river, it sits on the right bank of the river. It is nestled deep inside the Grand Port bay at the southernmost tip of the Des Creoles mountain range.

== History ==
It is named after an earlier village called Bel Air which existed till the 1960s roughly 2 km upstream of the mouth of the Riviere des Creoles river. The name Bel Air is French in origin and means good air or breezy. The village used to sit on high ground with a large view of the Grand Port bay. It was on the Cent Gaulettes road which used to be an old French colonial road for connecting the port of Grand Port to the interior of Mauritius. The present village came about from the merger of with an existing village called Camp Vinson located south closer to Mahébourg. Most of the people from the previous village migrated about 2 km south and formed a village also called Bel Air. Another group migrated 2 km east and also formed a village called Bel Air. To differentiate the two the southern one which was a bigger village was called Grand Bel Air and the smaller eastern one was called Petit Bel Air, French for Bigger and Smaller Bel Air.

== Administration ==
The village is administratively part of the Grand Port district. It has an elected Village Council for local administration.
