= Beau Vallon =

Beau Vallon may refer to:

- Beau Vallon, Mauritius, a village
- Beau Vallon, Seychelles, a bay and district
