= Rémy Ollier =

Mauritian political activist (1816–1845)

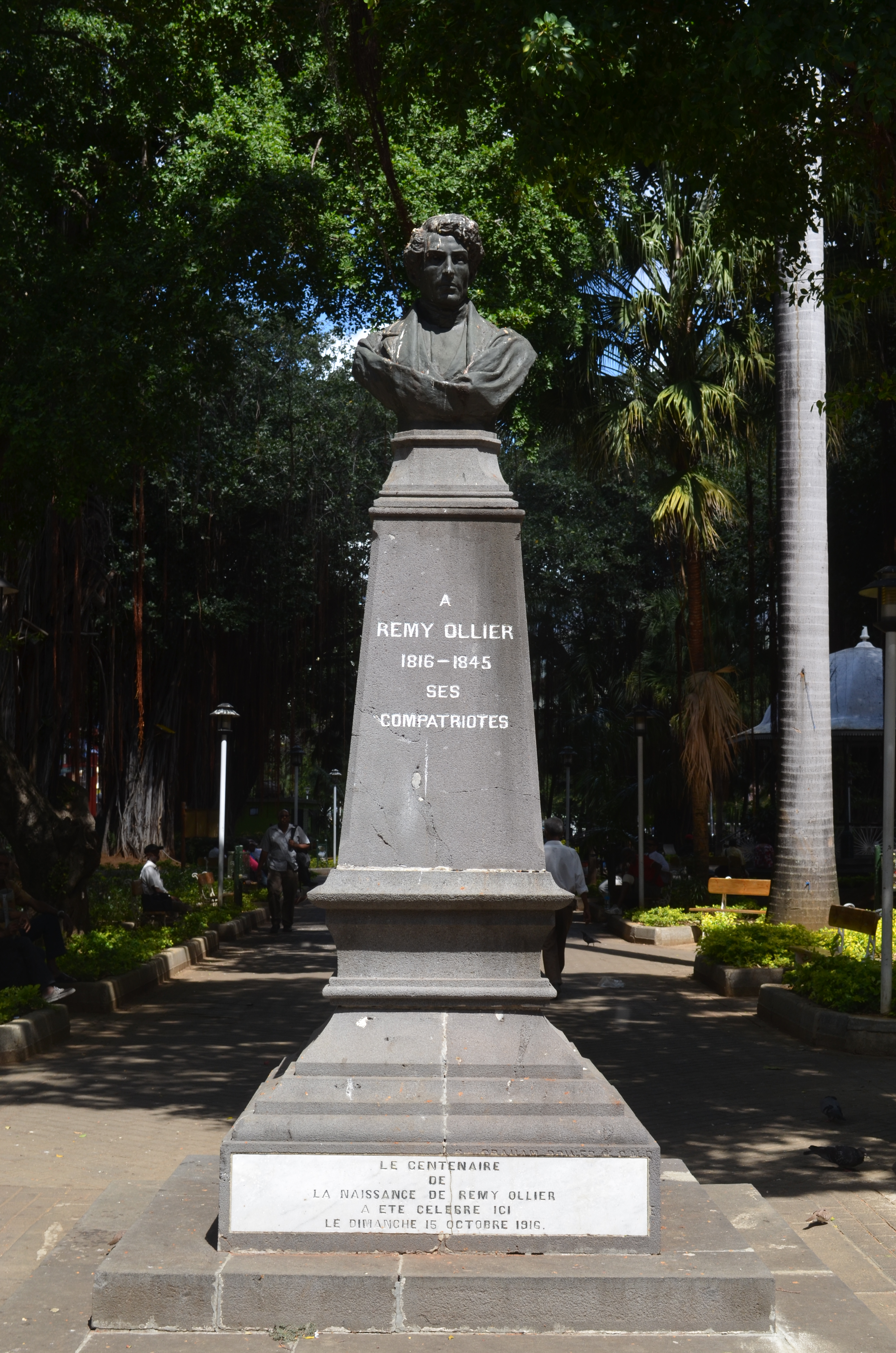
- Statue commemorating Rémy Ollier, Jardin de la Compagnie, Port Louis
- Born: October 6, 1816; Beau-Vallon, Mauritius
- Died: January 26, 1845 (aged 28); Port Louis, Mauritius
- Occupations: Journalist, educator, human rights activist

Rémy Ollier (October 6, 1816 – January 26, 1845) was a Mauritian journalist, author, and political activist.

== Early life ==
Rémy Ollier was the son of Benoît Ollier, a French artillery captain, who had settled in Beau-Vallon around 1799, and Julie Guillemeau, a freed slave. Like other settlers (and rich creoles), Rémy's father owned slaves.

== Activism ==
In 1832, Ollier was deeply impressed by the conflict between the abolitionist John Jeremie, sent by the British government to end slavery, and the French slave owners in Mauritius. When Ollier was 16 years old, his father died. His family moved to the street in Port Louis which bears his name today. He had to stop his studies and take a job as an apprentice in a saddlery. In 1838, he married Louise Adrienne Ferret. The couple had two children, a daughter, Sidonie, and a son, Ogé Louis Benoit. In 1841, he and his wife founded a school in Rue d'Entrecasteaux, Port Louis. He also worked as a French tutor in the schools of Port Louis.

At 21, he became a spokesman for the emancipation of the gens de couleur. Since the newspapers were controlled by the oligarchy of the sugarcane planters, Ollier helped found the weekly newspaper La Sentinelle de Maurice in April 1843. La Sentinelle was published alongside the English-language The Mauritius Watchman.

In his writings he persistently advocated political and civil equality through a common British subjecthood. In 1843, together with Edward Baker, his partner in the Sentinelle newspaper, he addressed a petition to Queen Victoria asking for the election of coloured representatives, which would strengthen the loyalty of this community to the British Crown.

His criticism of capital punishment and barbarous prison conditions led to improvements. When the newspaper Le Cernéen, run by the white planters oligarchy, was struck with a libel suit, Ollier defended his political enemy in the name of press freedom. Although he was violently assaulted by thugs and thrown into prison, Ollier continued writing.

Rémy Ollier succeeded in convincing the English colonial government to open the scholarship system to non-white applicants, and in 1844 the first two coloured students travelled to England.

Ollier died, only 28 years old, officially of intestinal inflammation. Rumours of foul play by his political adversaries continued to circulate, and until today the circumstances of his death remain unclear.

== Legacy ==
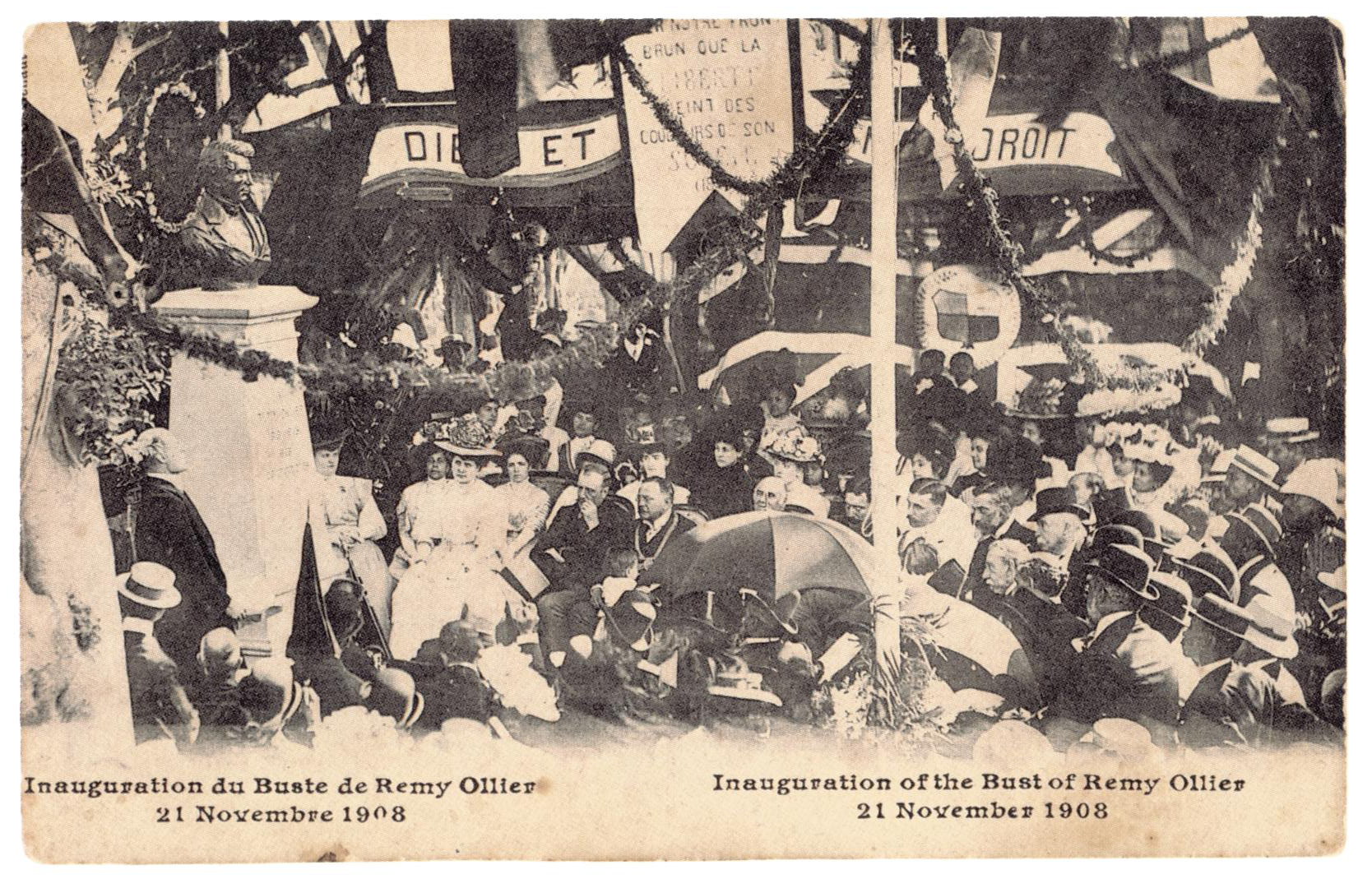
Inauguration of a commemorative bust of Rémy Ollier in 1908

All major towns and many villages in Mauritius have a street called Rue Rémy Ollier or Avenue Rémy Ollier, and many schools are named after him.

A bust of the activist was erected in the Jardin de la Compagnie in Port Louis in 1908 and his 100th anniversary celebrated there 8 years later.

In the 20th century, the Mauritian writer and political leader Basdeo Bissoondoyal called Ollier a "Ghandiate before Gandhi".

== Gallery ==
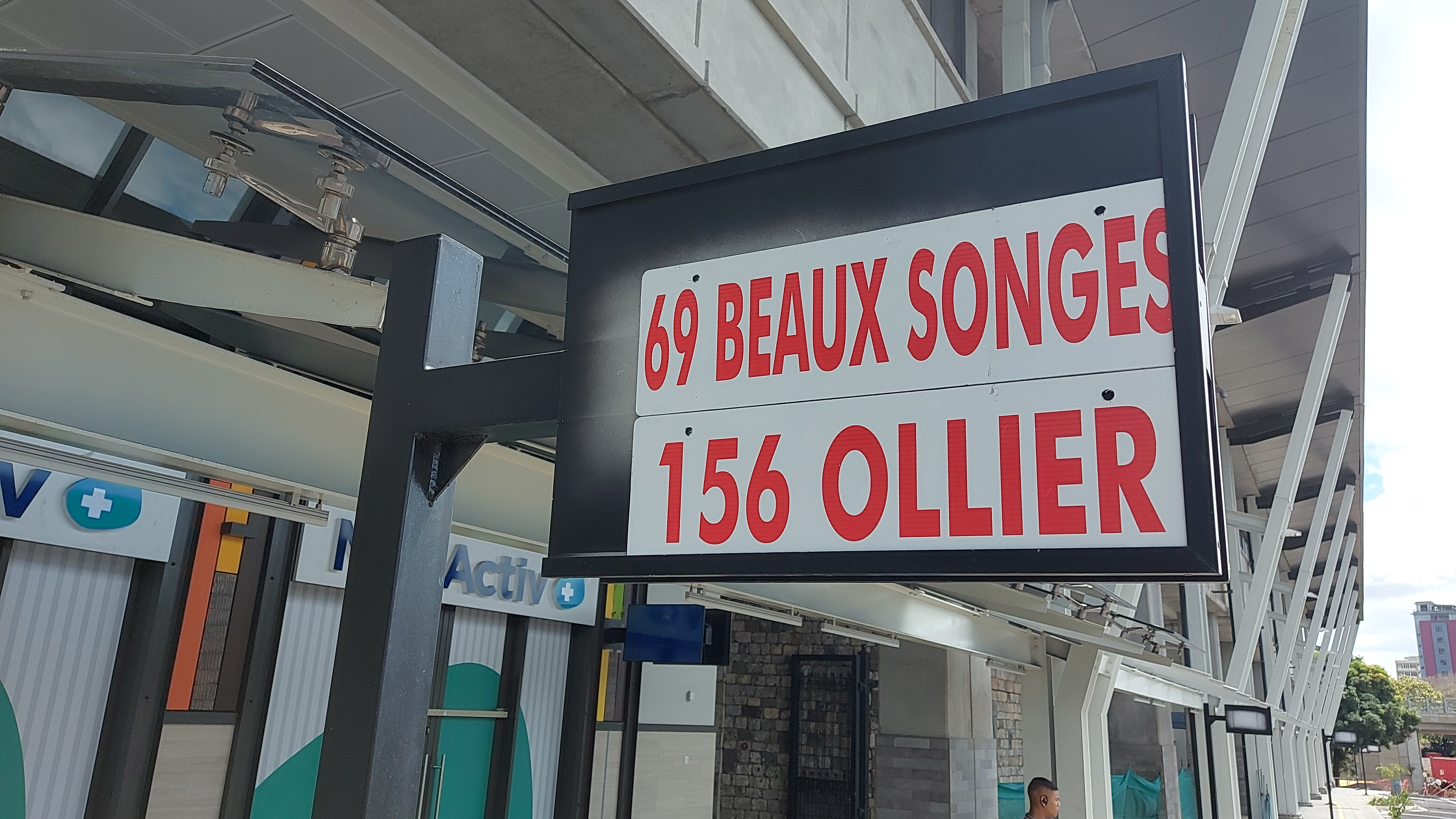
The bus line 156 leads from Port Louis to the Rémy Ollier Depot in Vacoas, Mauritius.

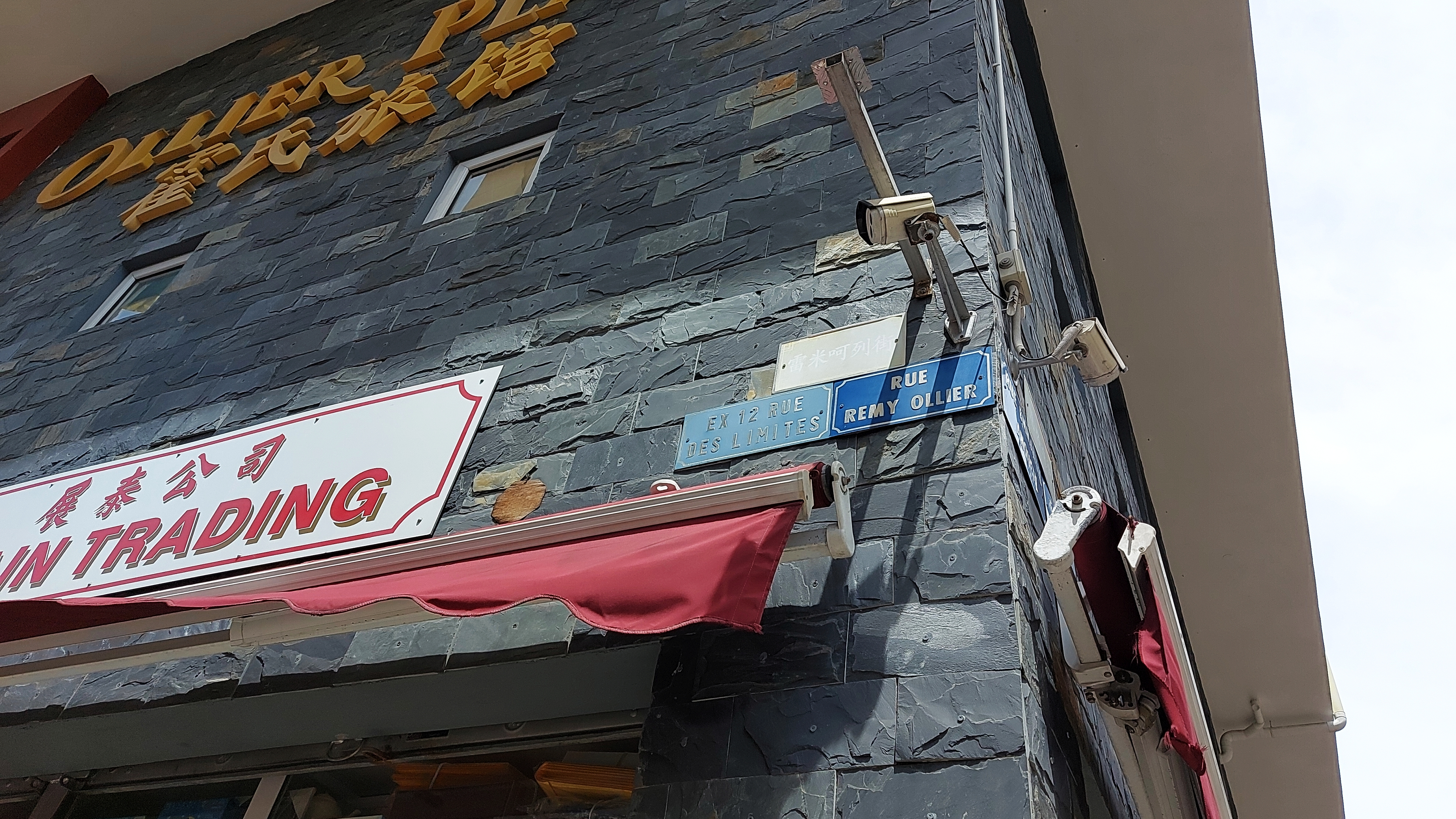
Rue des Limites in Port Louis was renamed Rue Rémy Ollier.

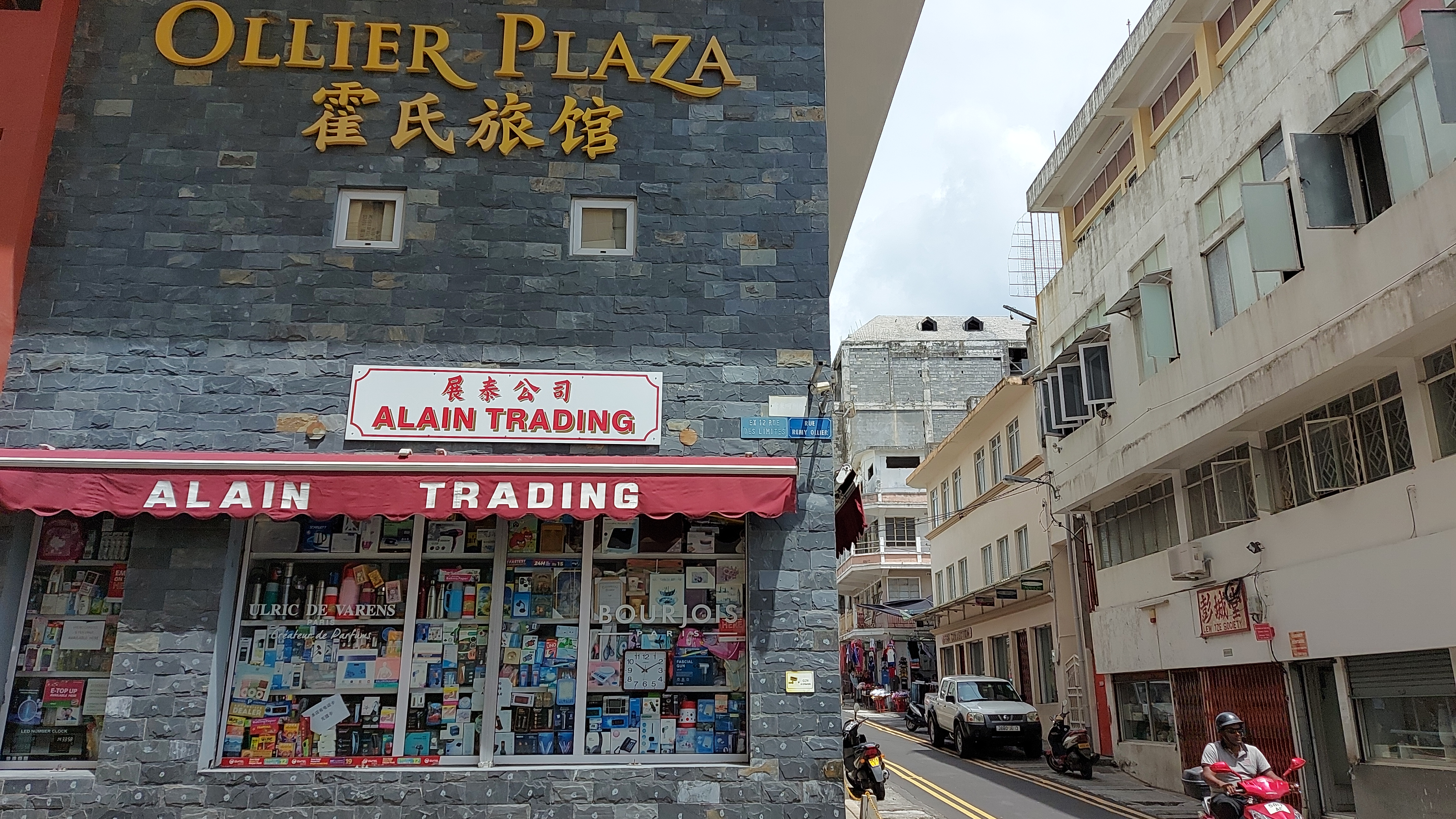
Ollier Plaza is a building on Rue Rémy Ollier.

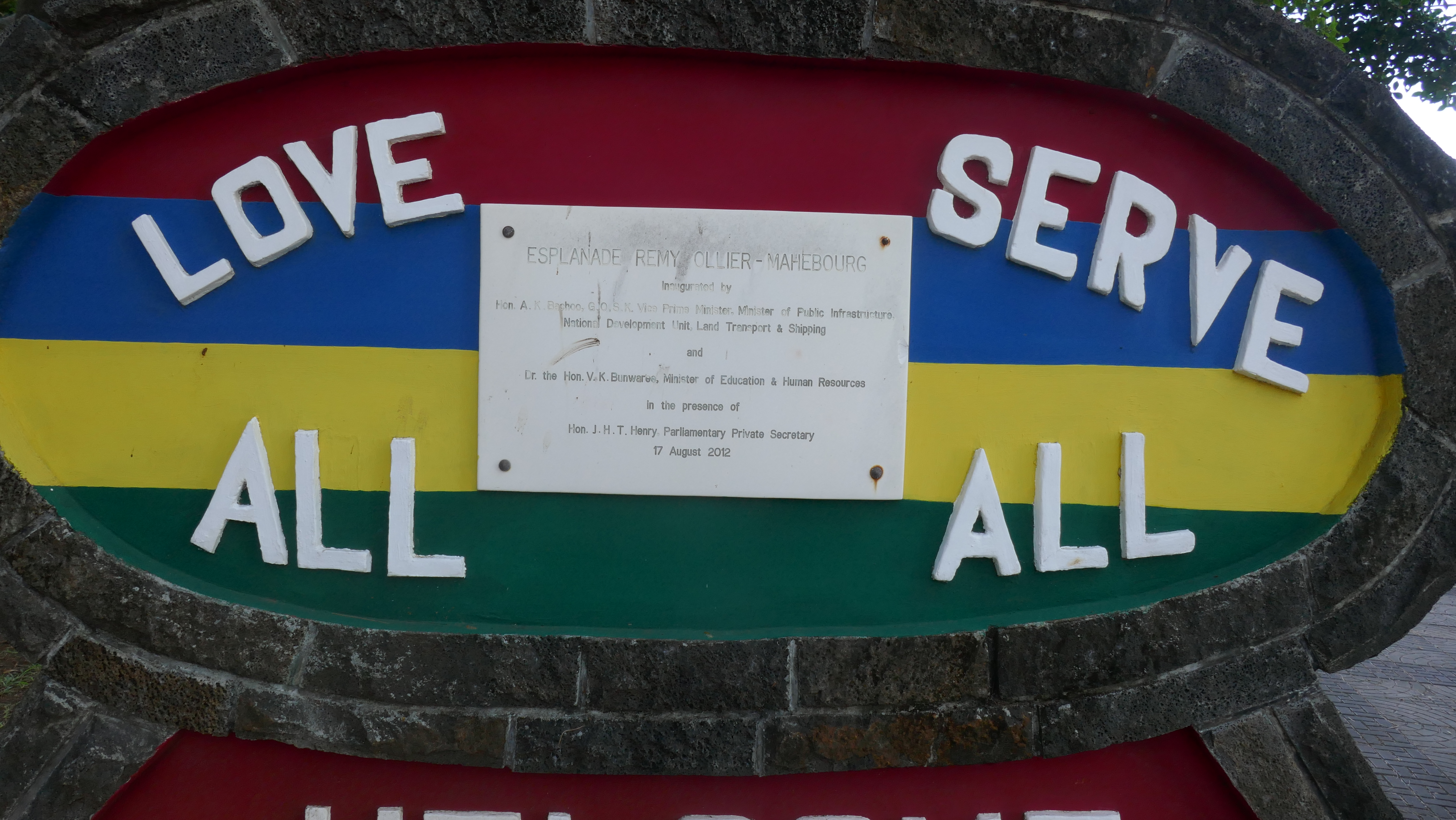
The Rémy Ollier Esplanade in Mahébourg was inaugurated in 2012.

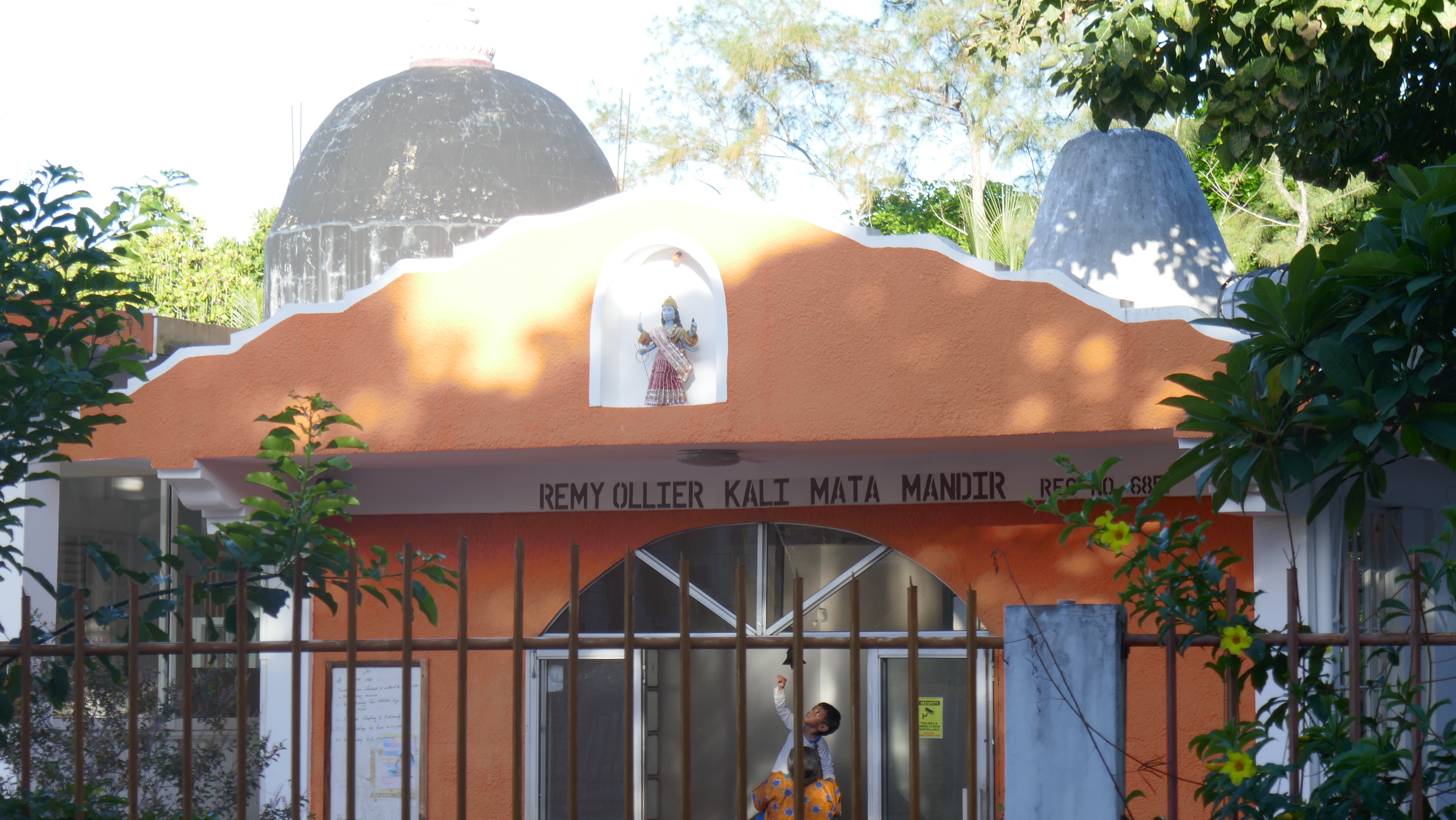
The Hindu Temple "Rémy Ollier Kali Mata Mandir" is located near Rémy Ollier Square in Mahébourg.

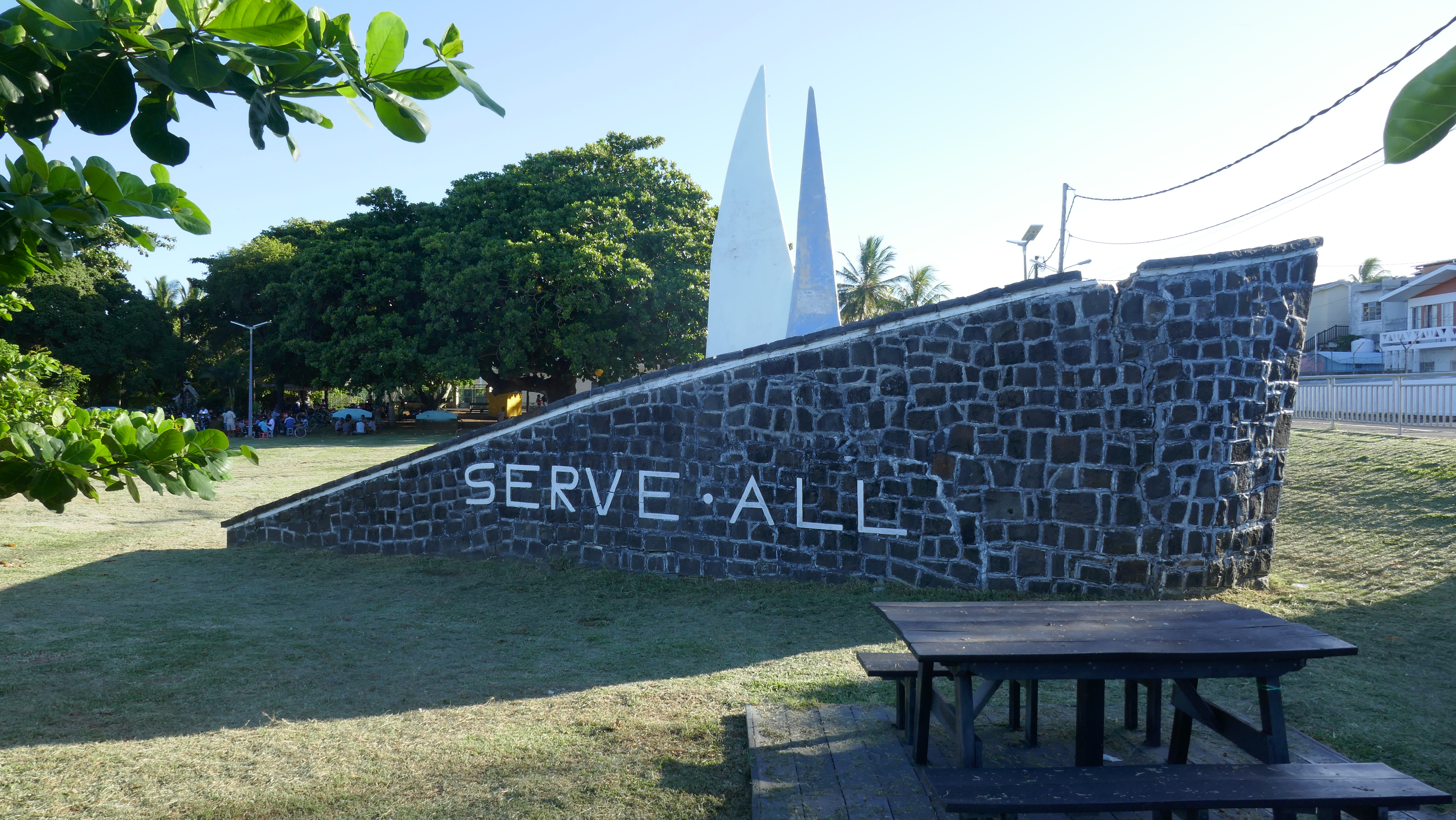
The Rémy Ollier Monument in Mahébourg.

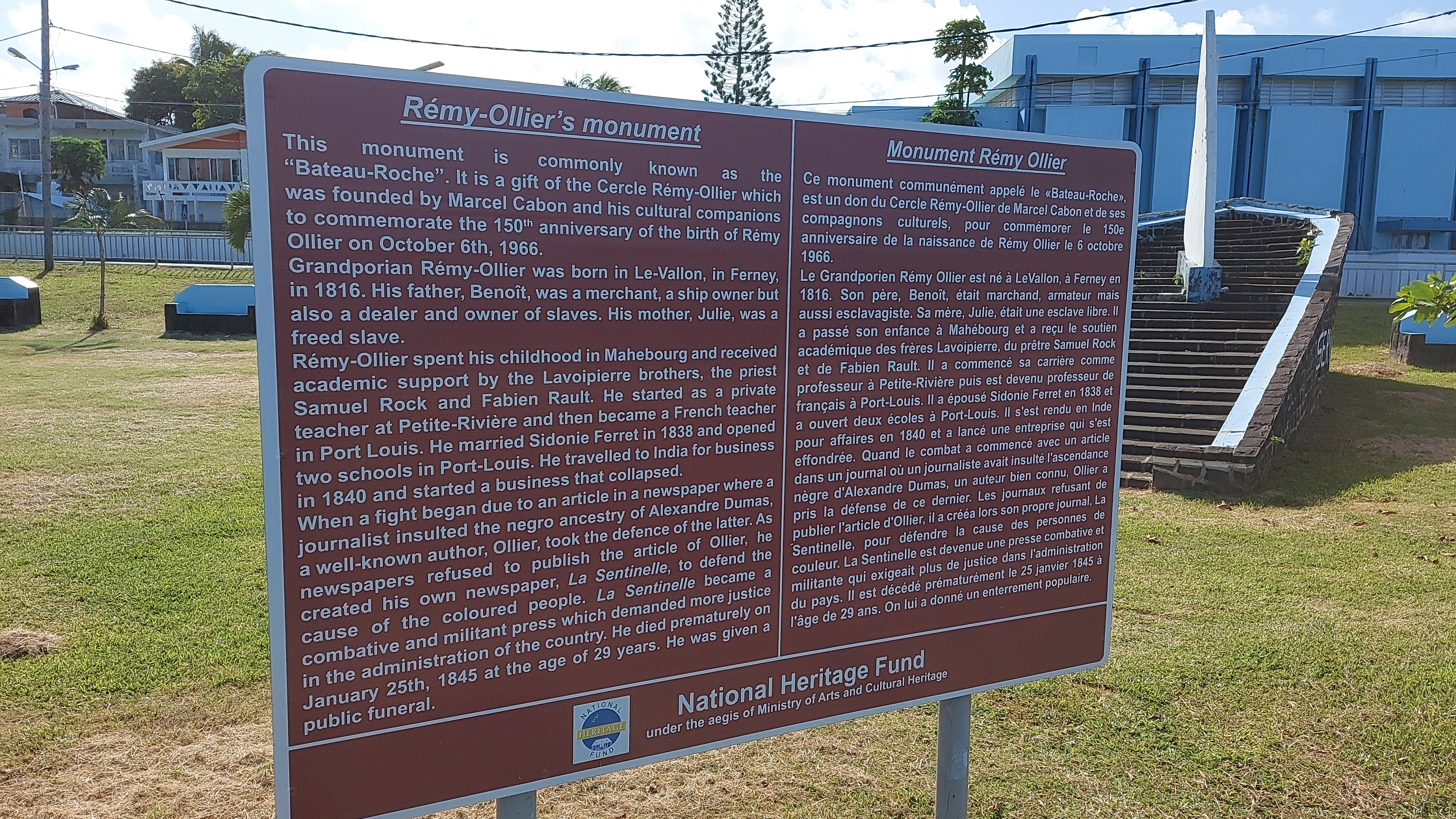
Board explaining the historical significance of Rémy Ollier.
