= Islets of Mauritius =

The Islets of Mauritius include c. 130 tiny islets and rocks scattered around the coast of Mauritius, Rodrigues, Agalega and St Brandon.

== Île aux Cerfs ==
Île aux Cerfs (French for deer island) is an island near the east coast of the island of Mauritius. Nowadays there are no more deer on this island, but the island does have a luxury golf course. The only method of access is by ferry from Trou d'Eau Douce or by specific speed boats or catamarans.

The part of the ocean surrounding the islet is rather shallow, so you can walk for more than 100 meters in the ocean and the water won't cover you.

A great number of tourists visit the island every day, especially on weekends. Near the beach there are many merchants selling a variety of Mauritian souvenirs, clothing and handmade accessories.

== Round Island ==
Round Island is an uninhabited islet 22.5 kilometers north of Mauritius. It has an area of 2.08 square kilometers and a maximum elevation of 280 meters. The island is a nature reserve under the jurisdiction of the Mauritian Ministry of Agriculture and Natural Resources.

Rare reptiles that are endemic to Round Island include the Round Island skink, Round Island day gecko, and Round Island boa.

Geographic coordinates: 19.8500370°S 57.7833333°E

== Île de la Passe ==
Île de la Passe is a rocky islet in the bay of Grand Port on the island of Mauritius. Between 20 and 25 August 1810, during the British campaign to capture the island (then called Île de France) from the French, it was the scene of a long and very hard-fought action between roughly equal forces of French and British frigates and, on balance, a defeat for the British, who lost four frigates, though one of these was subsequently recaptured and the French squadron did not survive the British invasion of Mauritius.

== Coin de Mire ==
Coin de Mire, also called Gunner's Quoin, measures just 65 hectares and lies 8 km north of Mauritius. There are remnants of a sugar plantation set up by Dutch settlers. Gunner's Quoin is near Île Plate, also called "Flat Island".

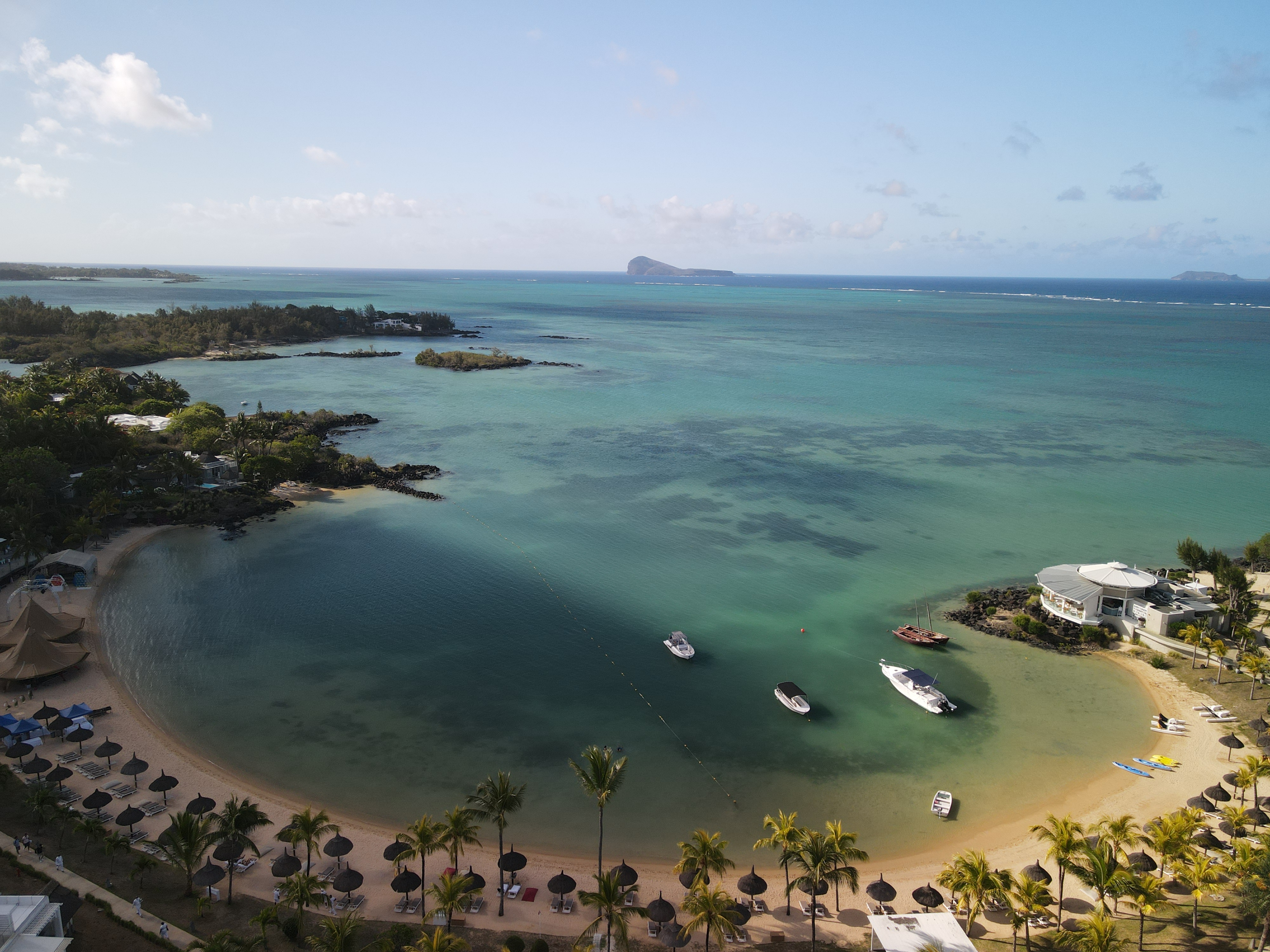
Coin de Mire in the distance

== Île D'Ambre ==
Île D'Ambre, or Amber Island, is an islet off the eastern coast of Mauritius. It is relatively large compared to some of the other islets, and it has a number smaller islets of its own, including Île Mounick, Matapan Island and Îlot Canarde. The Forestry Services of the Ministry for Agriculture, Fisheries and Natural Resources is in charge of the islet.

In the early hours of 18 August 1744 the vessel Le Saint Géran was shipwrecked on the reef of this island, resulting in the drowning deaths of 172 passengers, with only 9 survivors. It is known for having the last definite sighting of a dodo in 1662.

== Pointe Bernache ==
Located not too far from Île D'Ambre, Pointe Bernache is a small islet which is popular with tourists as it has a stunning beach on its south coast. The island is surrounded by a lagoon, which is often fished in.

== Flat Island ==
Flat island, known as Île Plate in French, is located near Round Island, Île aux Serpents and Coin de Mire at the extreme north of Mauritius. It includes Flat Island, which is at risk of submerging, the unvegetated Îlot Gabriel and the tiny Pigeon Rock. There is a graveyard on the island dating back to the 19th century; people suffering from malaria and other diseases were sent to the island by the British to stop the germs from spreading. It also houses one of the two working lighthouses in Mauritius.

Flat island area harbors an internationally famous dive site called The Shark Pit where divers can witness sharks swirling within the pit for the rich oxygen available due to the crushing waves against the cliffs of Pigeon Rock.

== Grand Port Islets ==
The Grand Port islets once made up a small volcanic island which has submerged with the rising tide. The islets around Grand Port include Île aux Aigrettes, Île aux Flamants, Île Vacoas, Île aux Fouquets (also known as Île au Phare), Île aux Fous, Île aux Oiseaux, Rocher des Oiseaux, Île de la Passe (above), Île Marianne, Îlot Chats and Île aux Signes amongst many others. Clashes between the French and English sometimes took place around the islands in the Battle of Grand Port, to determine control of Mauritius.

== Reservoir Islets ==
The reservoirs of La Ferme and La Mare du Vacoas both have at least one small, land-tied islet within them. In the case of La Ferme (an unnamed islet, but often called Île de la Ferme), there is a small weather station on the islet.

== Île aux Serpents ==
Known as Serpent Islet or Serpent Island in English, there are, despite the name, no snakes on the island; the last indigenous snake species once survived here but became extinct shortly after European arrival. The islet is mountainous.

A subspecies of Serpent Island gecko, Nactus serpensinsula serpensinsula, is endemic to this islet. Centipede Scolopendra abnormis is only found on this islet (where it is abundant) and the nearby Île Ronde, Mauritius.

== Mouchoir Rouge ==
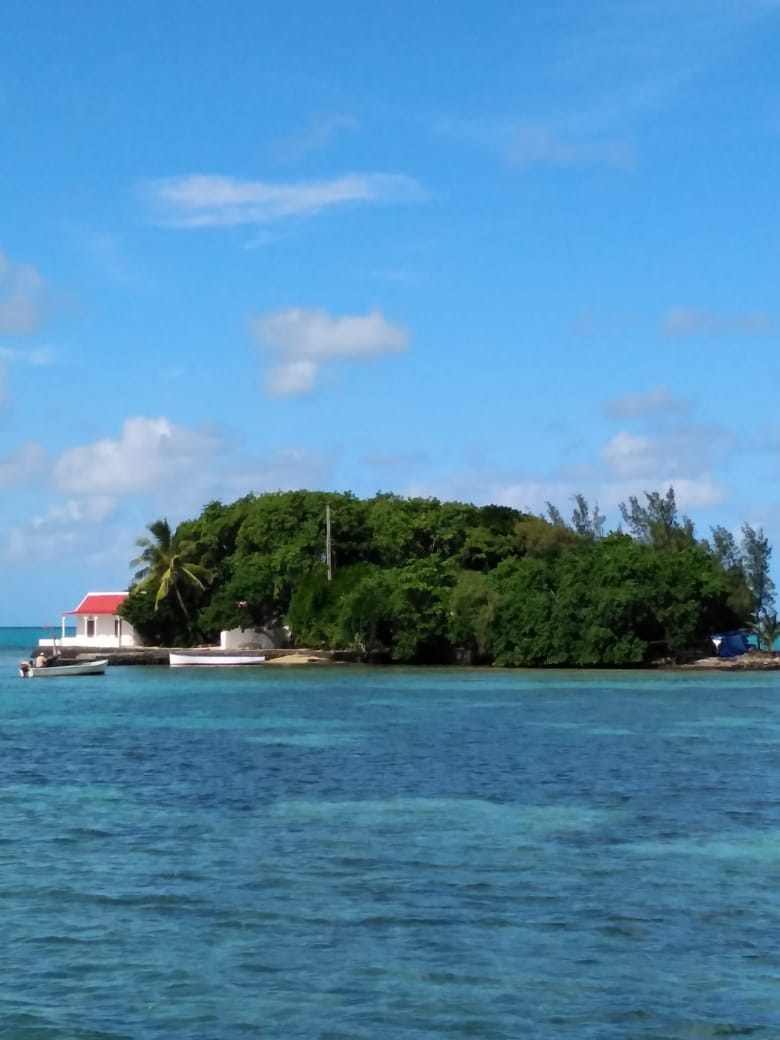
Mouchoir Rouge Mahebourg

Mouchoir Rouge is a small island about the size of a football pitch located in the bay of Grand Port, in Mahebourg. Formal habitation of the island appears to date back to the mid-1800s. It is said by local Mahébourgeois that up until a hundred years ago, it was possible to walk on low tides to this small treasure island and some also did so on stilts.

=== Provenance of the name 'Mouchoir Rouge' ===
Many stories abound.

- Some anecdotal evidence suggests it was called the 'Coin-du-Mouchoir' in the 1850s.
- Other sources and rumours suggest that the name Mouchoir Rouge came from the consort of the tax collector Mr. Henri Edwin Dennie to indicate to her paramour that her husband was out on his horse collecting taxes.
- Another anecdote suggests the name of the island comes from the calling of water taxis (with a red handkerchief) from the mainland.
- Mr. Laval Bangard, the current (2020) caretaker was born on the Mouchoir Rouge as was his father and grandfather. Mr. Laval Bangard reported to l'Express in an article dated 19 August 2020, entitled 'Island Legends' that 'there are a lot of stories about the name Mouchoir Rouge' but it was also called 'Hangar Island' during the second world war and that soldiers were billeted on it.

=== History ===
- During the 1860s, M. Edwin Dennie had the island on bail from the government as part of the pagiometrie where he created a small salt-pan and a little garden. He also reportedly erected a bathroom on the side facing the reefs. This is corroborated by Mauritius 1859 Government records where Mr. Henri Edwin Dennie is listed as a tax collector (Collectors and Distributors of Declarations) for the Grand Port District.
- The 1892 Mauritius cyclone destroyed the island. There was another smaller islet pointing towards Lion Mountain, but this then disappeared. At low tide, it now emerges as a small sandy rock.
- On 27 February 1960 2 struck Mauritius, producing wind gusts of 256 km/h (159 mph) and totally flooded the Mouchoir Rouge and severely damaged it. The caretakers just managed to get off the island in time to save their lives as recounted by Mr. Maingard to Ms Karen Walter of the L'Express (Mauritius) newspaper on 19 August 2020.

=== Owners ===
- During the 1860s, it was the Mr. M. Edwin Dennie.
- Mr Adam was the first owner known to the current caretaker 66-year-old Mr. Laval Bangard (who was born on the Mouchoir Rouge as was his father and his grandfather, Gabriel Bangard)
- Mr. Pousson was the second owner known to Mr. Laval Bangard and Mr. Pousson left shortly after Independence, circa 1969.
- Mrs Maigrot, a doctor, was the third owner known to Laval Bangard and she lived on the island for 40 years, until 2005.

== Île aux Bénitiers ==
Île aux Bénitiers, named after the benitier, includes a large island, with coconut plantations and is permanently inhabited and the smaller Îlot Benitier. The main island is 2 km long and 500m wide lying off of La Gaulette. The islet of Îlot Bénitier has been on private lease since 1927 and also supports a small plantation, but is only accessibly for a few months a year. On the northern tip of the main island there are small colonies of migratory birds. Île aux Bénitiers is currently under Nubheebucus Family Control.

== Îlot du Mort ==
Known as Dead Man Island by the British, the island is known to be the site of many shipwrecks. It is located off the coast of Rivière du Rempart District.

== Barkley Island ==
Barkley island is a small, rocky islet located in the Port Louis Harbour. The Caudan Waterfront incorporates the islet as an anchorage for the many ships that visit the harbour.

== Île Albatross ==
Île Albatross is located near Savanne, southern Mauritius. There are thousands of migratory birds on the island and it has been declared a nature reserve.

== Île Fournaise ==
A small, once-volcanic islet off the coast of Île d'ambre, this islet was named after the famous volcano on nearby Réunion. It is thought to have broken away from Île D'ambre.

== Île des deux Cocos ==
Also known as Île aux deux Cocos, the island, located off the southern coast of Grand Port, is named after the two abandoned coconut plantations it houses. The plantations were set up by the French, but were abandoned after crops were damaged during a lengthy storm in the 18th century.

== Île de l'Est and Île aux Chats ==
Both of these relatively large islands, lying to the east of Mauritius and considered part of Flacq, become temporarily merged at low tide. The islets are an increasingly popular camping site and there are plans to rebuild a disused lodge on Île de l'Est.

== Île aux Lubines ==
This islet is located not too far off from Île aux Chats; it is a nature reserve that can be visited with permission.

== Île Vacoas ==
Not to be confused with the Grand Port islet, the Île Vacoas of Flacq was named after the Vacoas (endemic palm tree, whose scientific name is Pandamus), endemic to the Macarene islands.

== Îlot Seychelles ==
Îlot Seychelles is a small islet within the Port Louis harbour. The name comes from the Seychelles islands to the north.

== Le Souffleur ==
The small Le Souffleur was named so due to the whistling sound it makes when the waves crash against the rocks. It is located on the southern side of the Savanne district, not far from Souillac.

== Île Fregate ==
Named after the uncommon Fregate colony on the island, Île Fregate has been declared a nature reserve by the Mauritian government.

== Île aux Tonneliers and Île Albatross ==
Originally a single peninsula joined to mainland Port Louis, this has since split to form two separate islets. Île aux Tonneliers is the larger of the two, which serves as an anchorage site for ships. The island is covered in shrub. Île Albatross is smaller and unvegetated.

== Île Sancho ==
The islet of Île Sancho is relatively new, having as recently as the 1950s been a small sandbank. It is now covered with vegetation and is a stopping point for vessels travelling through the Indian Ocean. It is located off the coast of Savanne and is surrounded by an extended reef.

== Île Roches ==
Île Roches is located in between Grand Port and Flacq. There is little vegetation and has been of little use since an unsuccessful attempt by the British to plant coconut trees there.

== Île Crabe ==
Île Crabe is an islet off the southwest coast of Rodrigues. It is named after the large colony of Land Crabs on the island. As of 2023, its area is 0.40 km^{2}.

== Île aux Sables and Île aux Cocos ==
Île aux Sables and Île aux Cocos are two islets off the eastern coast of Rodrigues. Both are nature reserves and home to meteorological stations. They are well known for their abundant birdlife.

== Cat Island ==
Cat Island (French: Île aux Chats) is a small island lying south of Rodrigues in the Indian Ocean. It is surrounded by a coral reef and is known for its diving and snorkelling sites.

== Hermitage Island ==
Hermitage Island (French: Île Hermitage) is a small island lying south west of Port Sud-Est in Rodrigues. It is reputed to be the location of buried treasure and is a popular destination for tourists.

== Île aux fous ==
Crazy Island (French: Île aux fous) is a small island lying off the coast of Rodrigues, Île aux fous is named after the leper colony on the island during the Dutch conquest of Mauritius.
