= Mare Chicose =

Village in Mauritius

Coordinates: 20°23′S 57°38′E

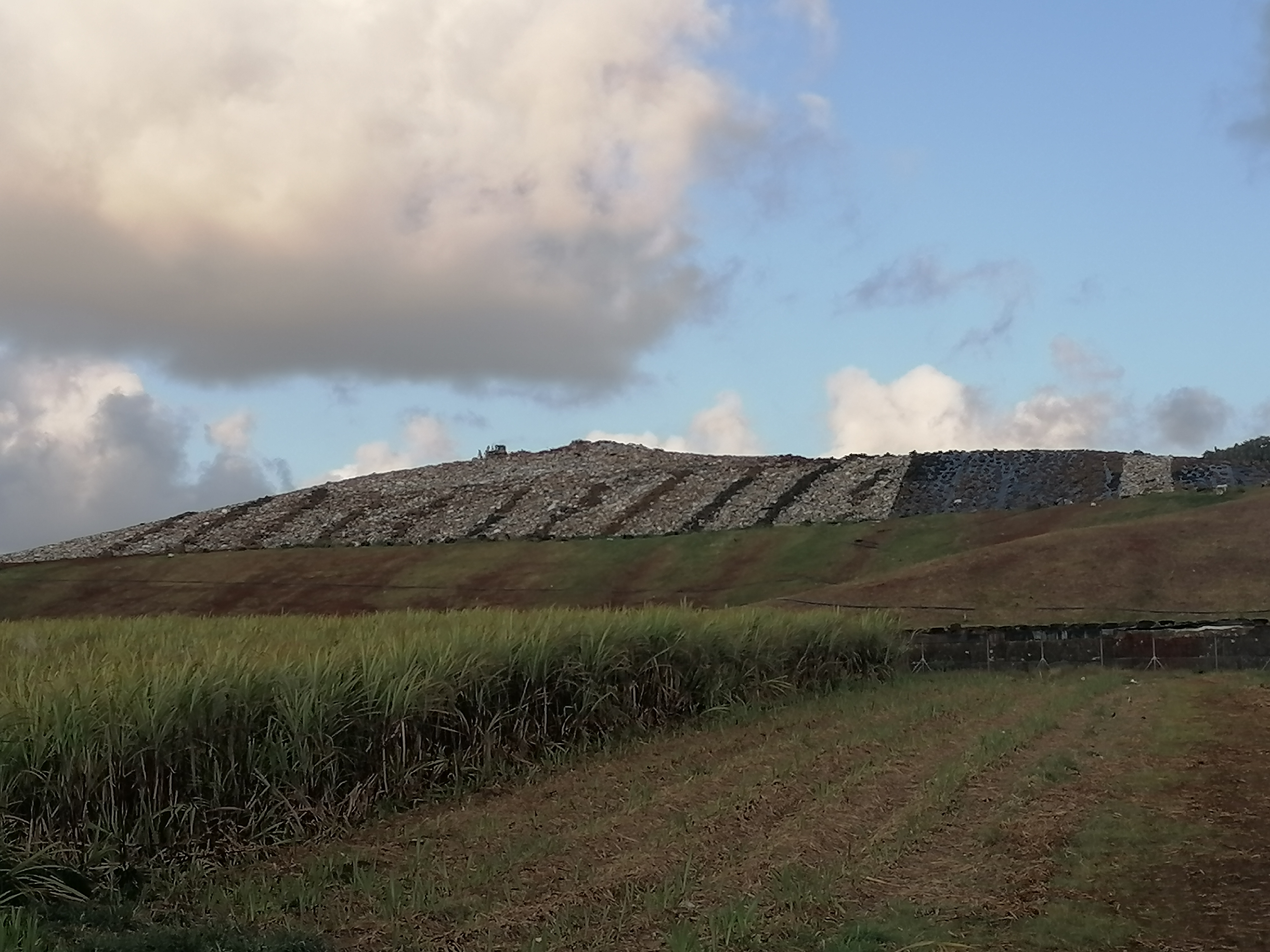
Mare Chicose

Mare Chicose is a village in the Grand Port district of Mauritius. The village has been abandoned because of the smell of the nearby Mare Chicose Landfill site.
