= List of lighthouses in Mauritius =

This is a list of lighthouses in Mauritius.

In 1995, the lighthouses of Mauritius were commemorated on four stamps.

== Lighthouses ==
| Name | Image | Year built | Location & coordinates | Class of light | Focal height | NGA number | Admiralty number | Range nml |
|---|---|---|---|---|---|---|---|---|
| Pointe aux Caves Lighthouse | | 1910 | 20°11′28.3″S 57°24′41.5″E | Fl (2) W 10s. | 46 metres (151 ft) | 32852 | D7096 | 29 |
| Pointe aux Sables Lighthouse | | n/a | 20°10′04.0″S 57°28′19.0″E | Al Iso WG 4s. | 24 metres (79 ft) | 32872 | D7097 | 10 |
| Port Louis Range Front Lighthouse | | n/a | 20°09′28.0″S 57°29′54.6″E | Oc R 10s. | 39 metres (128 ft) | 32861 | D7101 | 13 |
| Port Louis Range Rear Lighthouse | | n/a | 20°09′43.0″S 57°30′13.8″E | F or Fl WRG as direction | 69 metres (226 ft) | 32861.5 | D7101.1 | 17 |
| Île Plate Lighthouse | | 1855 | 19°52′54.4″S 57°39′00.2″E | Fl (4) W30s. | 111 metres (364 ft) | 32848 | D7096 | 29 |

== See also ==
- Lists of lighthouses and lightvessels
