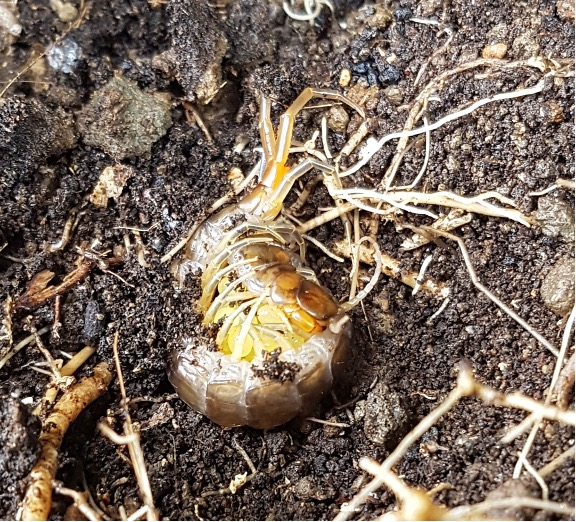
- Scolopendra abnormis female with eggs (Round Island, Mauritius)
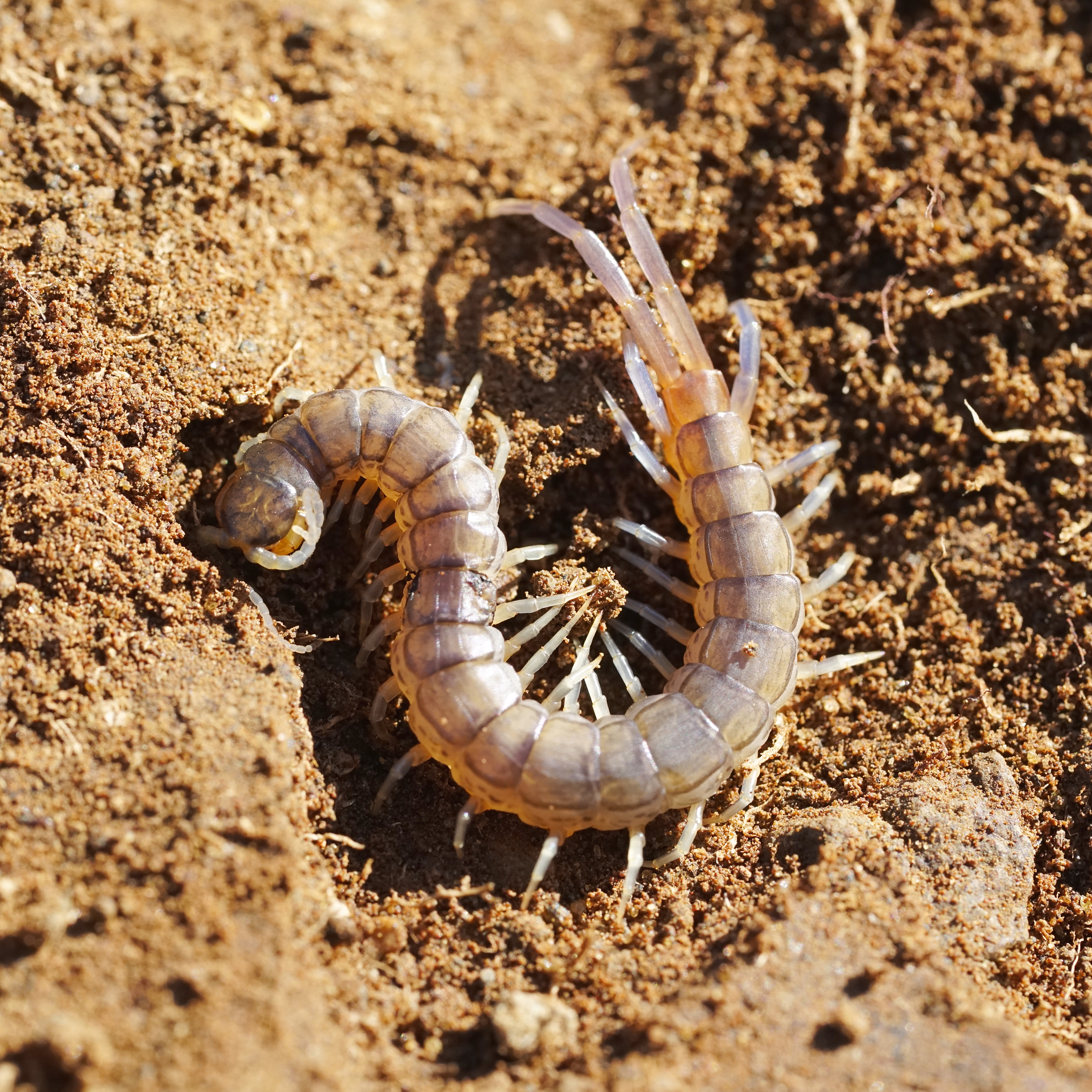
- A large Scolopendra abnormis individual (ca. ~90 mm long), found nesting beneath a rock embedded in soil (Round Island, Mauritius)

Conservation status
- Vulnerable (IUCN 2.3)

Scientific classification
- Kingdom: Animalia
- Phylum: Arthropoda
- Subphylum: Myriapoda
- Class: Chilopoda
- Order: Scolopendromorpha
- Family: Scolopendridae
- Genus: Scolopendra
- Species: S. abnormis

Binomial name
- Scolopendra abnormis J. G. E. Lewis & P. Daszak, 1996

= Scolopendra abnormis =

Species of centipede

Scolopendra abnormis, the Serpent Island centipede, is a species of centipede in the family Scolopendridae that is endemic to Mauritius. It only occurs on two outlying islands, Round Island and Serpent Island. On Serpent Island it is very common, reaching densities among adults of 12 per square metre (1.1 per square foot) in suitable habitat.

== Evolution ==
Ancestors of Scolopendra abnormis likely colonized Mauritius a few million years ago but became extinct there because of introduced predators, with only relict populations surviving on outlying islands. Scolopendra abnormis are unable to swim and probably reached their current habitats by rafting or during ice ages when Round and Serpent Islands were connected to Mauritius through land bridges.

== Description ==
Scolopendra abnormis grow to at least 95 mm (3.7 in) in length, with the specimens from Serpent Island being slightly larger than those from Round Island. Their overall colour is yellowish. They do not show escape reactions when exposed.

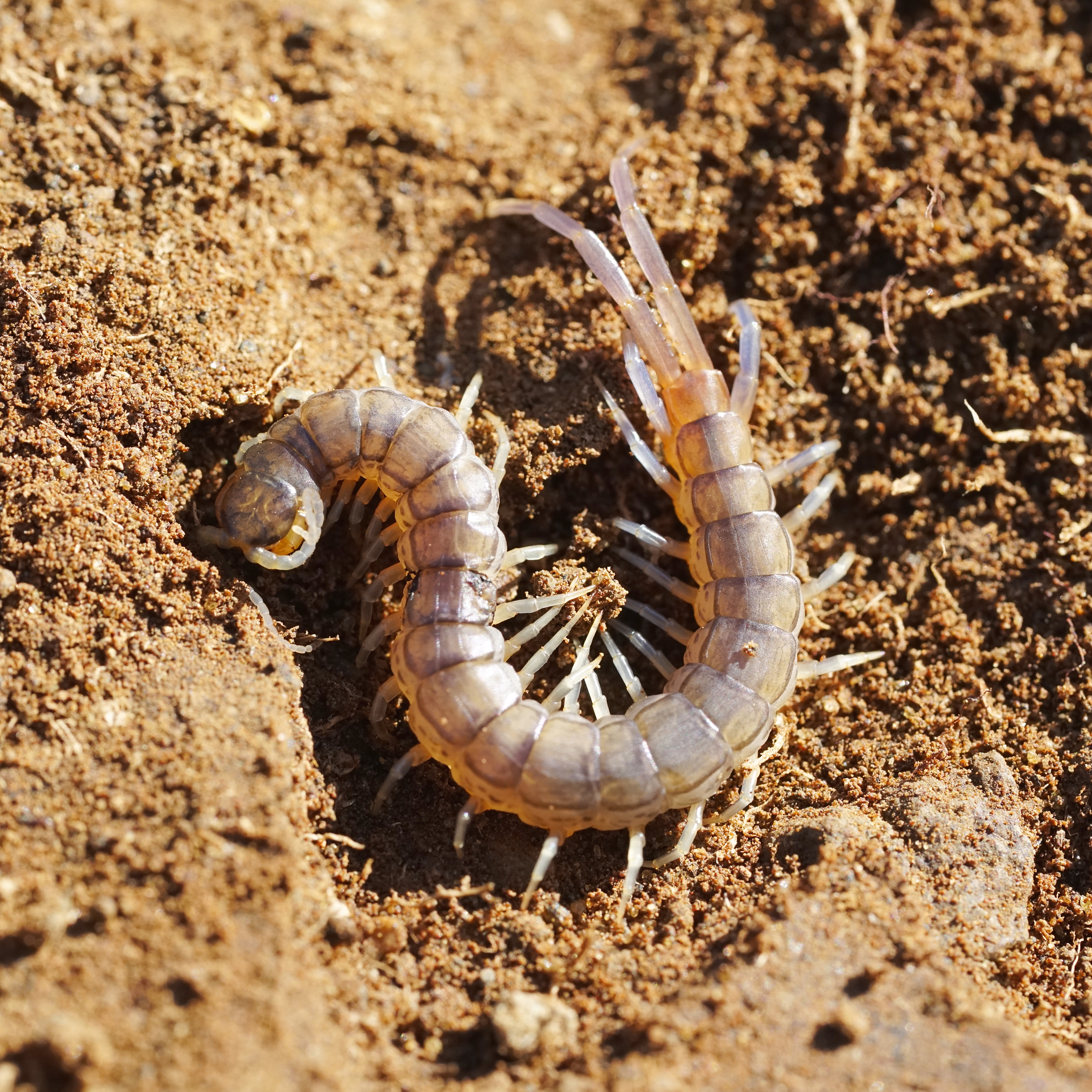
A large Scolopendra abnormis individual, found nesting beneath a rock embedded in soil. Photographed 2023.

== Ecology ==
Scolopendra abnormis are typically found under rocks or between slabs of volcanic tuff (Round Island), or in loose networks of burrows in humid peat-like soil between slabs of rock (Serpent Island). They are nocturnal carnivores that feed mainly on insects. A dietary metabarcoding study found that approximately one quarter of centipedes also consume Bojer's skink, a species of skink endemic to Mauritius found over Round Island which listed as Critically Endangered on the IUCN Red List. They can inflict a painful bite on humans. Scolopendra abnormis are preyed upon by Serpent Island geckos and Round Island skinks.
