= Grand Port District =

- District
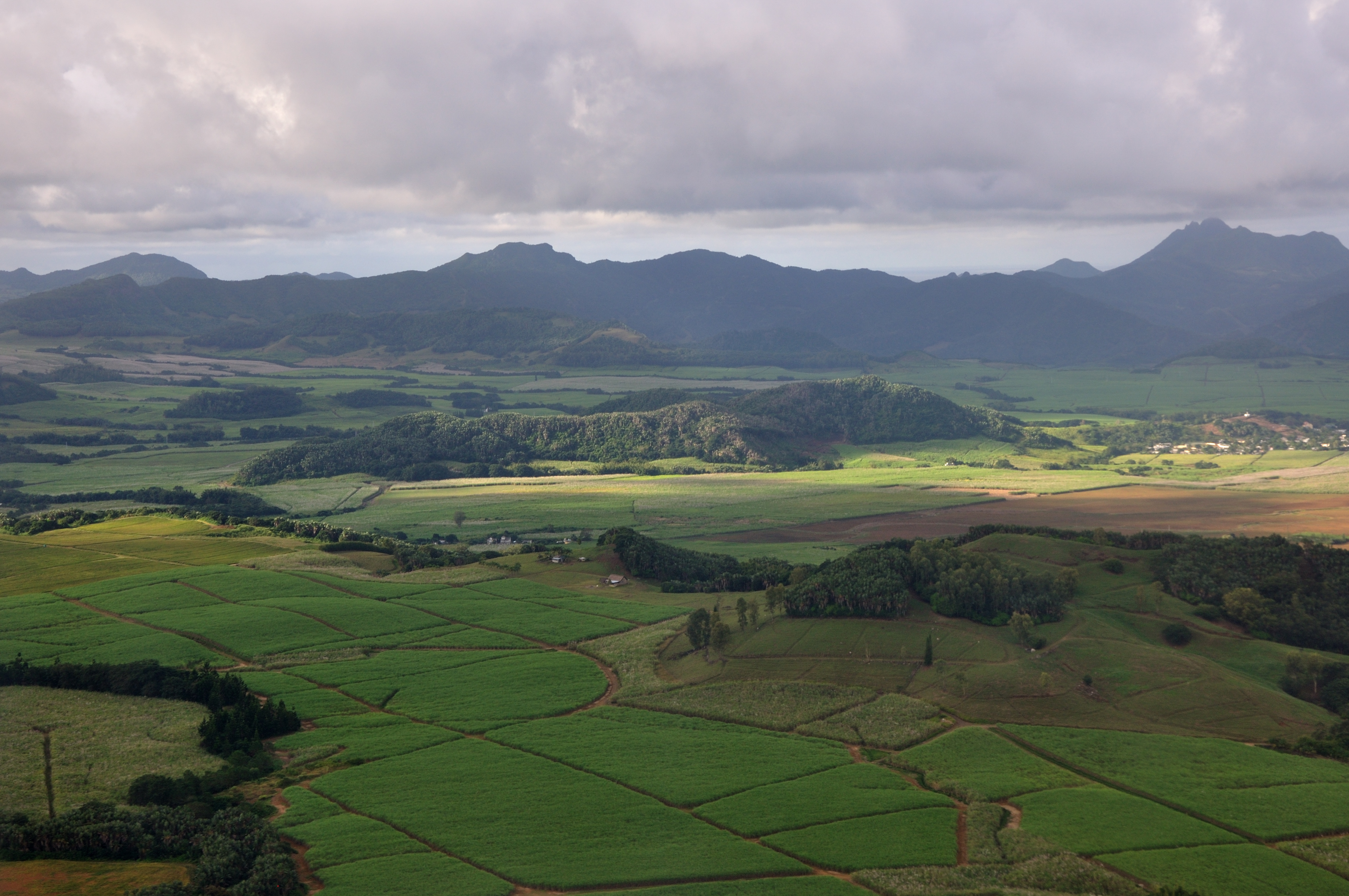
- Sugar cane plantations near Rose Belle

- Map of Mauritius island with Grand Port District highlighted
- Coordinates: 20.40°S 57.64°E
- Country: Mauritius

Government
  - Type: District Council
  - Chairman: Mr. Ruggoo Yashveer
  - Vice Chairman: Mr. Seegobin Megduth

Area
  - Total: 260.3 km^{2} (100.5 sq mi)

Population (2015)
  - Total: 112,997
  - Rank: 5th in Mauritius
  - Density: 434.1/km^{2} (1,124/sq mi)
- Time zone: UTC+4 (MUT)
- ISO 3166 code: MU-GP (Grand Port)

Grand Port (Mauritian Creole pronunciation: [ɡʁɑ̃ poː]) is a district of Mauritius, situated in the east of the island. The name means "large port" in French. The district has an area of 260.3 km^{2} and the estimated population was 112,997, as of 31 December 2015.

== History ==
Grand Port is named after the village of 'Old Grand Port' which saw the first Dutch landing and the first port of the island. It is centered on the town of Mahébourg on the coast, inside the Grand Port Bay. Built by the Dutch and later taken over by the French, the town is a reminder of the colonial past of the island.

In 1810, a French squadron of frigates achieved an ultimately futile naval victory over a comparable British squadron at the Battle of Grand Port, near the Île de la Passe.

== Places of interest ==
The district's most well known and popular beach is Blue Bay, one of the finest bathing spots on the island surrounded by a semicircle of filao trees. Situated on the southeast coast, not far from Mahébourg, Blue Bay offers a fine stretch of white sandy beach, and a deep, clear, light-blue bathing pool. There is also scope for yachting and windsurfing. Many structures in the district reflect the colonial past of the district.

Just north of Mahebourg, Vallée de Ferney contains indigenous forests and a range of endangered plants and animals. Off the coast, Ile aux Aigrettes is a small island where the original ecosystems of Mauritius have been to some degree rehabilitated. The bay of Grand-bay also known as Mahebourg bay itself offers a relatively well preserved underwater flora and fauna which makes it an ideal snorkeling site.

== Places ==
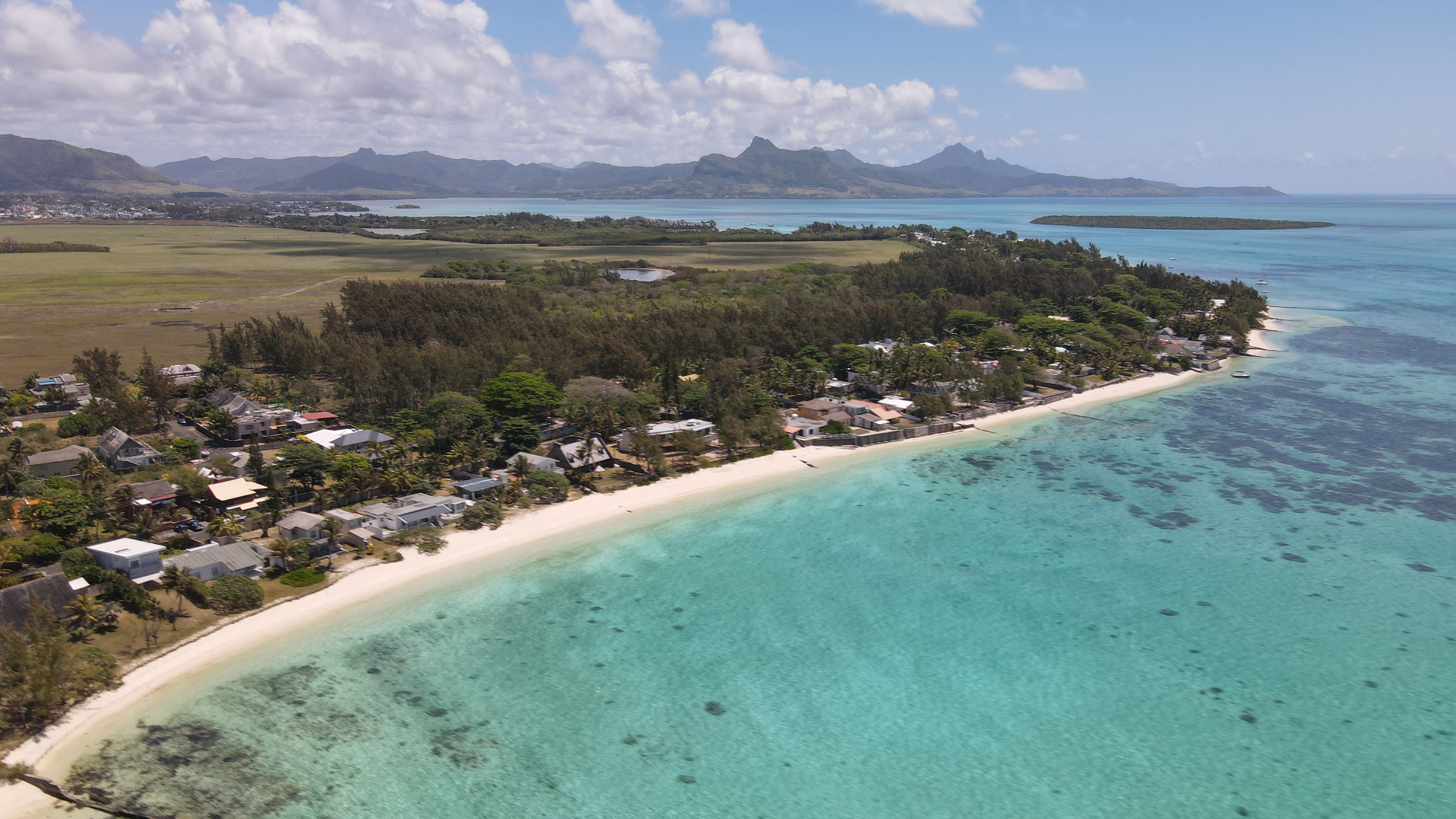
Aerial view of Bluebay / Pointe d'Esny area with Lion Mountain in view

The Grand Port District include different regions; however, some regions are further divided into different suburbs. Midlands and Seizième Mille village council areas are geographically in Plaines Wilhems district and have thus not been included in the places found in Grand Port. However, the residents do vote in local elections for the Grand Port District council. Note that the statistics do not take into account that Camp Carol was created out of Trois Boutiques and that Trois Boutiques was renamed Trois Boutiques (Union Vale) in 2011 following the new Local Government Act. The islands only airport of Sir Seewoosagur Ramgoolam International Airport is located in the Grand Port District.

=== Places by population ===
Places by population, area and density
Place	Population	Area in km^{2}	Population density per km^{2}
Bambous Virieux	1,496	7.7	194.5
Bananes	660	10.08	65.5
Beau-Vallon, Mauritius	6,904	10.13	681.5
Bois des Amourettes	1,880	6.52	220.7
Cluny	1,549	11.18	138.6
Grand Bel Air	1,538	2.8	549.3
Grand Sable	2,182	5.02	434.7
L'Escalier (West in Savanne district)	7,770	12.18	637.9
Mahébourg	15,176	2.24	6,775
Mare Chicose	325	15.63	20.8
Mare d'Albert	4,666	4.62	1,010
Mare Tabac	2,731	11.09	246.3
New Grove	10,518	5.55	1,895.1
Nouvelle France	7,165	15.92	450.1
Vieux Grand Port	2,969	31.72	93.6
Petit Bel Air	1,186	1.47	806.8
Plaine Magnien	10,443	13.99	746.5
Rivière des Créoles	3,066	6.2	494.5
Rivière Du Poste (West in Savanne district)	1,281	3.32	385.4
Rose Belle	12,035	9.13	1,318.2
Saint Hubert	3,153	35.47	88.9
Trois Boutiques (Union Vale)	7,322	36.87	198.6
Union Park	4,907	6.55	749.2

== Gallery ==
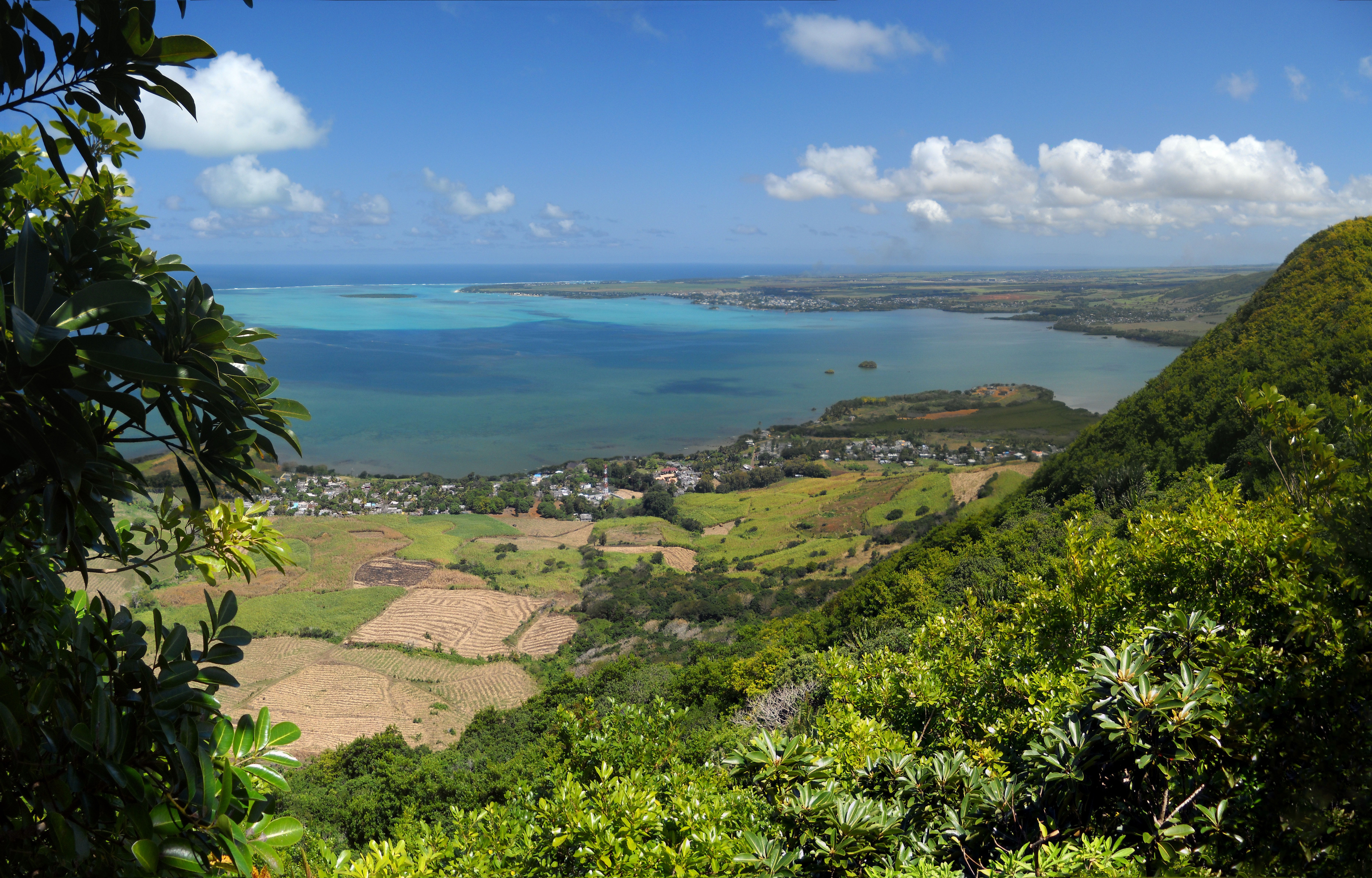
Grand Port seen from high ground.

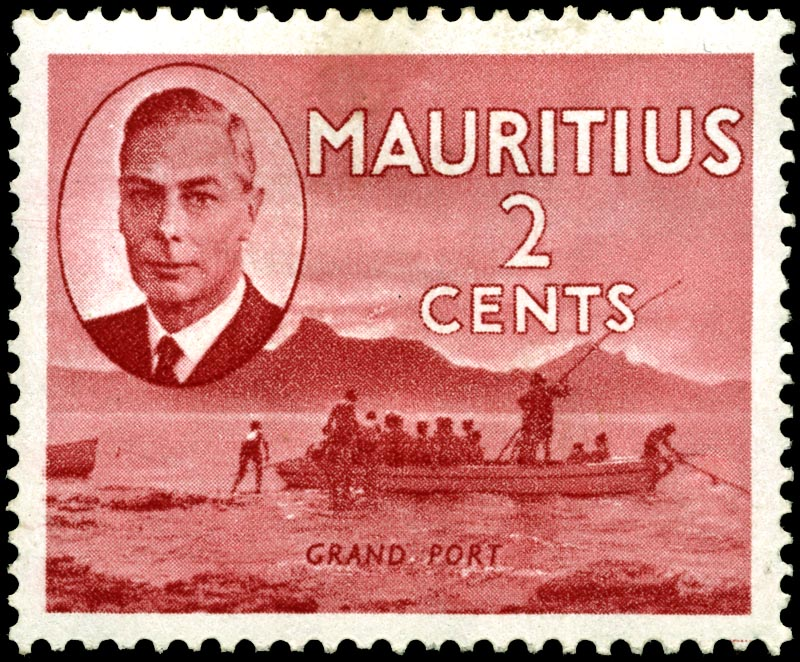
Grand Port on a 1950 stamp of Mauritius.

== See also ==
- List of places in Mauritius
