= Cnemaspis agarwali =

Scientific classification
- Kingdom: Animalia
- Phylum: Chordata
- Class: Reptilia
- Order: Squamata
- Suborder: Gekkota
- Family: Gekkonidae
- Genus: Cnemaspis
- Species: C. agarwali

Binomial name
- Cnemaspis agarwali Khandekar, 2019

Species of lizard

Cnemaspis agarwali (Agarwal's day gecko) is a species of diurnal, rock-dwelling, insectivorous gecko endemic to the Eastern Ghats of India. It is distributed in Sankagiri near Salem District of Tamil Nadu.
