= Île aux Fouquets =

Island in Mauritius

Nickname: Île au Phare
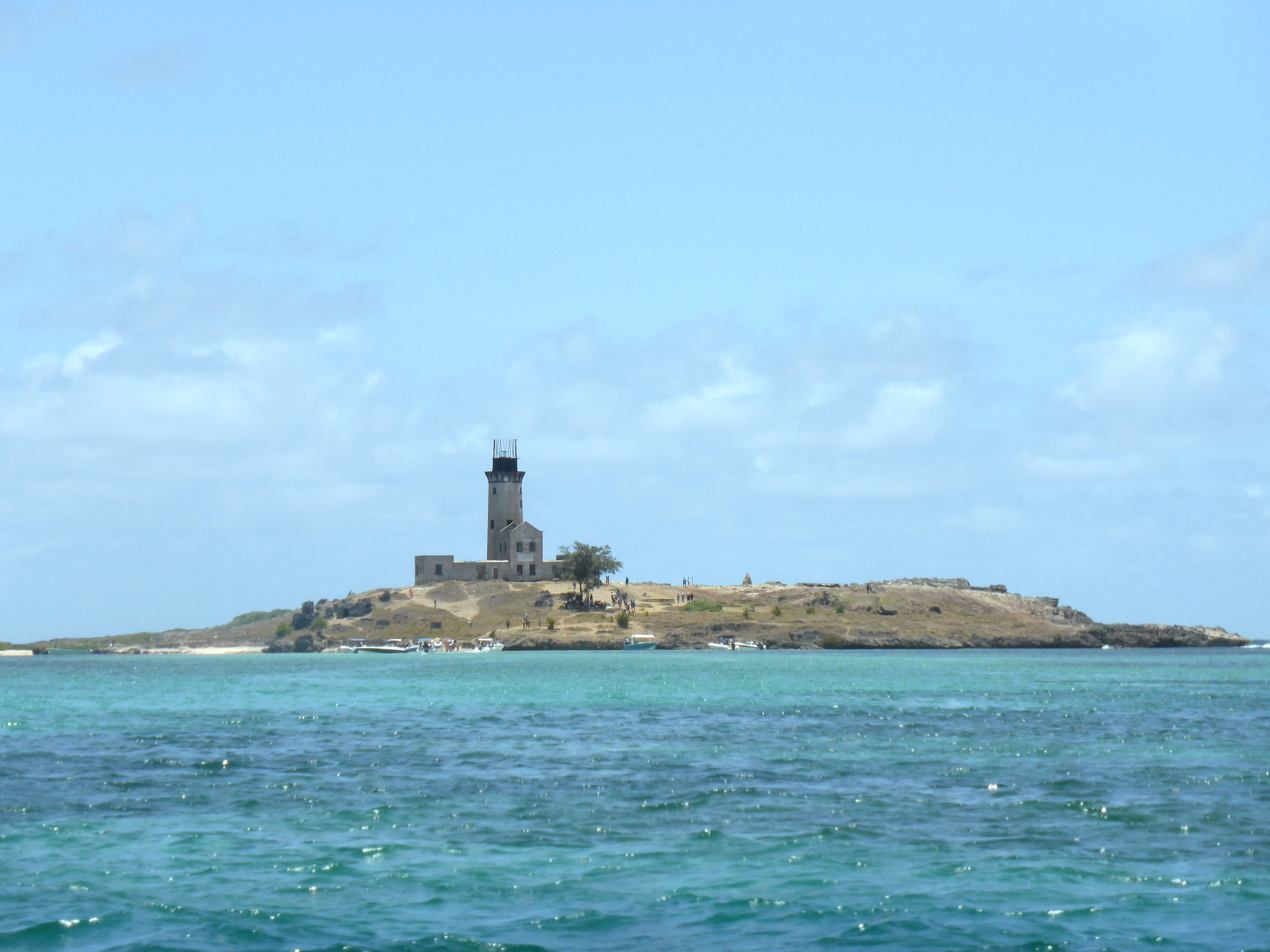

- Location in Mauritius

Geography
- Location: East coast of Mauritius
- Coordinates: 20.395796°S 57.777313°E
- Area: 2.49 ha (6.2 acres)

Administration
- Mauritius

Demographics
- Population: 0

Île aux Fouquets (also known as Île au Phare, Lighthouse Island) is an island off the south-east coast of Mauritius.

The island is of pure coral origin and has had Islet National Park status since June 5, 2004. It is located about five kilometers off the south-eastern coast in the vicinity of the islands of Ilot Vacoas and Île de la Passe. South of the islands is the only opening in the coral reef through which larger ships can pass. The size of the Île aux Fouquets is 2.49 hectares. According to the German zoologist Karl August Möbius, the name of the island goes back to a species of tern that bred in caves there and was called fouquet by the fishermen.

Around 1694, refugee Huguenots lived for a few years on the Île aux Fouquets under the direction of the Frenchman François Leguat. They had previously tried to establish a Protestant republic called Eden on the island of Rodrigues, 580 kilometers to the east. However, they broke off the project on the quite fertile island out of loneliness and decided to sail to Mauritius on a self-built barge without anchor and compass. Having safely arrived there, for unknown reasons they came into conflict with the Dutch governor, who banished them to the treeless Île aux Fouquets. Only years later were the men taken from there to the island of Java.

In 1810, not far from the Île aux Fouquets, the naval battle of Grand Port took place, which the French won. A good fifty years later, long after they had conquered Mauritius, the British erected a lighthouse on the island. The building from 1864 is now a ruin but is a listed building. The island offers a good view of the surrounding islands, the coast and the prominent Lion Mountain.

== See also ==
- Geography of Mauritius
