= Lion Mountain, Mauritius =

Mountain in Mauritius

Lion Mountain
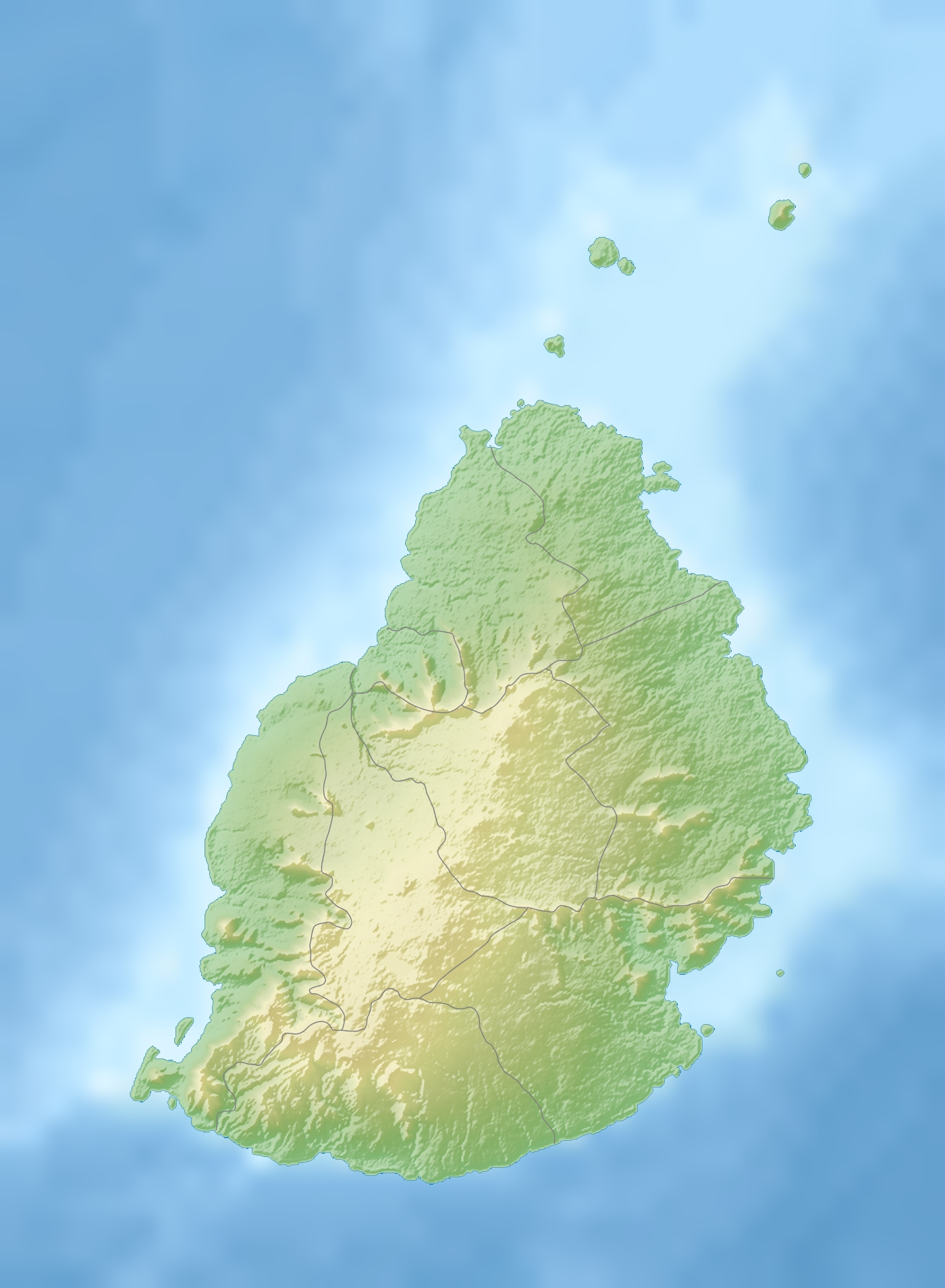
- Location within Mauritius

Highest point
- Elevation: 440 m (1,440 ft)
- Coordinates: 20°21′40″S 57°43′30″E

Geography
- Location: Mauritius

Geology
- Mountain type: Hill

Lion Mountain (Montagne du Lion) is a mountain near Vieux Grand Port, Mauritius. It is so called because it resembles a sleeping lion. It has an elevation of approximately 440 metres (1,440 ft).
