= Mahébourg =

Coastal town in Mauritius

Coordinates: 20°24′S 57°42′E

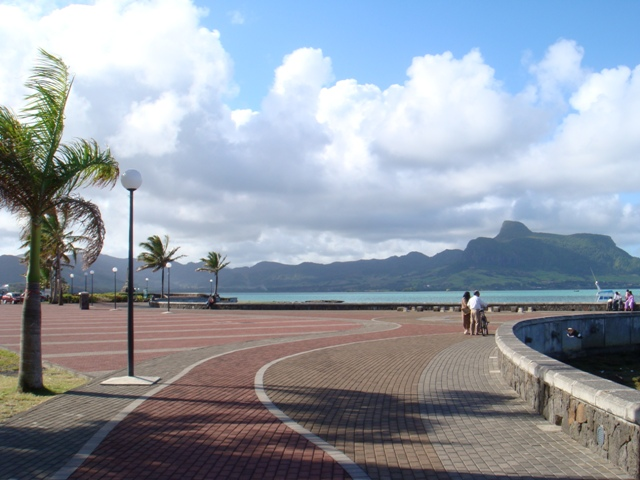
Mahébourg waterfront

Mahébourg is a small village on the south-eastern coast of the island of Mauritius, having a population of 15,457 as of 2015. It is considered the main town of the Grand Port District.

== Overview ==
Mahébourg is named after Bertrand-François Mahé de La Bourdonnais, one of the most successful governors of the French colonial period. The town was originally built by the Dutch during their brief period of colonisation of the island. It was close to their landing port, had ample water supply from many rivers and streams and had a scenic view of the large bay area. Mahébourg underwent major development around 1806, during the French colonisation era.

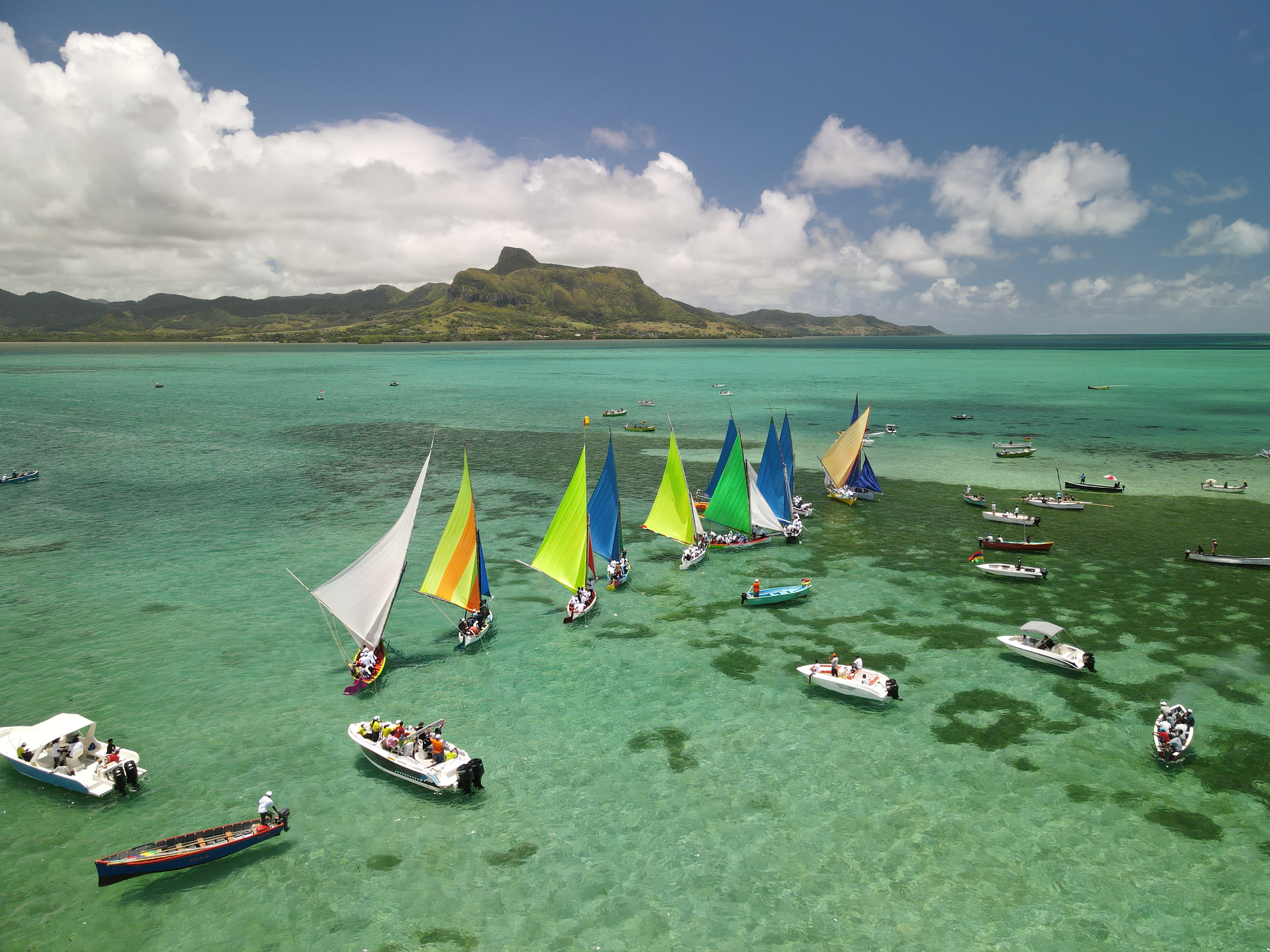
An annual regatta competition in Mahébourg held at the waterfront

The well-planned wide streets in the old section of Mahébourg still bear testimony to this Dutch and French colonial past. After the French chose Port Louis as the main port, Mahébourg declined into a sleepy coastal city. The past is still preserved today in the Historical Naval Museum which also recounts the epic naval battles of the past between the French Navy and the Royal Navy. The Frederik Hendrik museum in Vieux Grand Port recounts the history of the early Dutch settlement of the island.

Nowadays, Mahébourg is a bustling centre of local trade. The new waterfront complex offers memorable walks along the seaside. The town has a casino, mark of a developing tourism industry. There is a growing number of small inns in the city itself and the surrounding districts which cater to local and foreign visitors. Mahébourg is well known for its lagoon (the biggest in Mauritius) and for its fishing industry.

The town has three primary schools, namely Willoughby Government School, Dupérré Government School and Notre Dame des Anges Roman Catholic Aided (RCA), and four secondary schools: Emmanuel Anquetil State Secondary School, Hamilton College Boys, Hamilton College Girls and Loretto Convent of Mahébourg.

== Companies ==
The largest company and the main employer for the Mahebourg area is Omnicane. Omnicane's sugarcane mill is based at La Baraque which annually produces around 135,000 tonnes of Plantation White Sugar for the refinery, 400,000 tonnes of bagasse for its main cogeneration power plant, and 45,000 tonnes of molasses for the bioethanol distillery. Using energy-saving diffuser technology for juice extraction, Omnicane's sugarcane mill processes 1.3 million tonnes of sugarcane a year and has a daily milling capacity of 8,500 tonnes.

== View ==
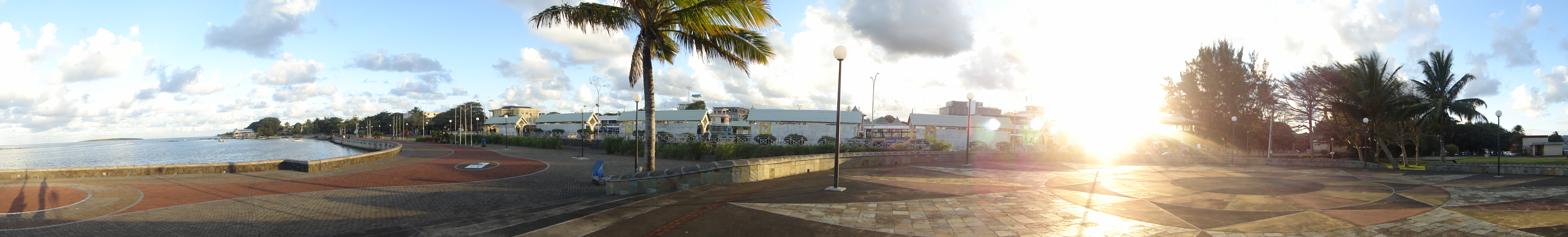
A panorama of Mahébourg taken from the Sir Gaëtan Duval Esplanade at dusk. Beginning at the Ile Aux Aigrettes on the far left to the Mahébourg Bus Station in the middle and the Mahébourg Social Welfare Centre at the far right.

== See also ==
- Railway stations in Mauritius
- Sir Seewoosagur Ramgoolam International Airport
- Category:History of Mauritius
