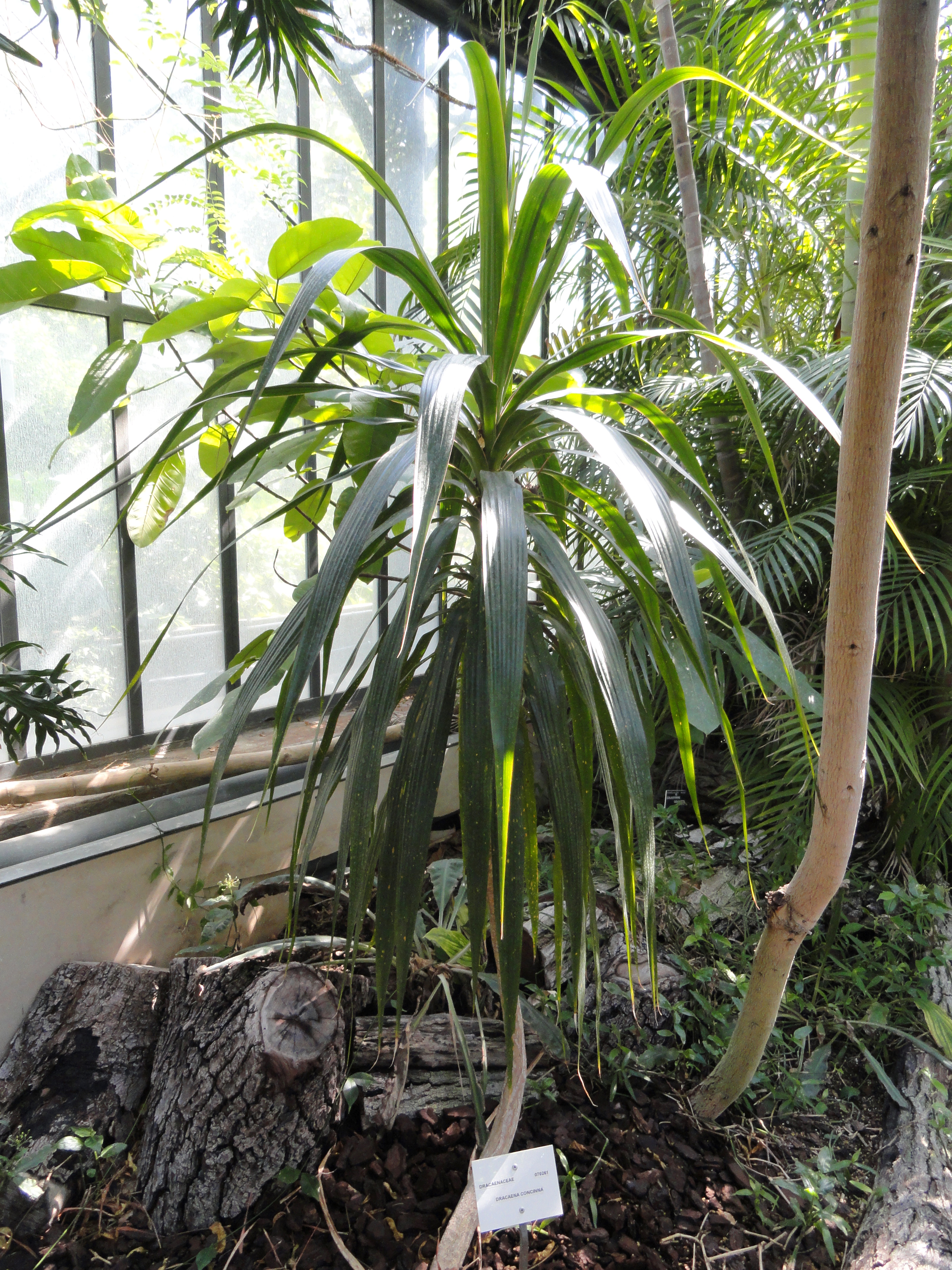
- In the Jardin botanique de Lyon, France

Scientific classification
- Kingdom: Plantae
- Clade: Tracheophytes
- Clade: Angiosperms
- Clade: Monocots
- Order: Asparagales
- Family: Asparagaceae
- Subfamily: Nolinoideae
- Genus: Dracaena
- Species: D. concinna

Binomial name
- Dracaena concinna Kunth

Synonyms
- Dracaena marginata var. concinna (Kunth) K.Koch; Draco concinna (Kunth) Kuntze; Cordyline betschleriana Göpp.; Dracaena betschleriana (Göpp.) K.Koch

= Dracaena concinna =

Species of flowering plant

Dracaena concinna is a species of flowering plant in the family Asparagaceae. It is native to Mauritius.

== Habitat ==
Dracaena concinna is a perennial shrub that grows in full sun to part shade and in slightly acidic to neutral soils.

== Classification ==
Dracaena concinna is classified under the genus Dracaena in the family Asparagaceae.
