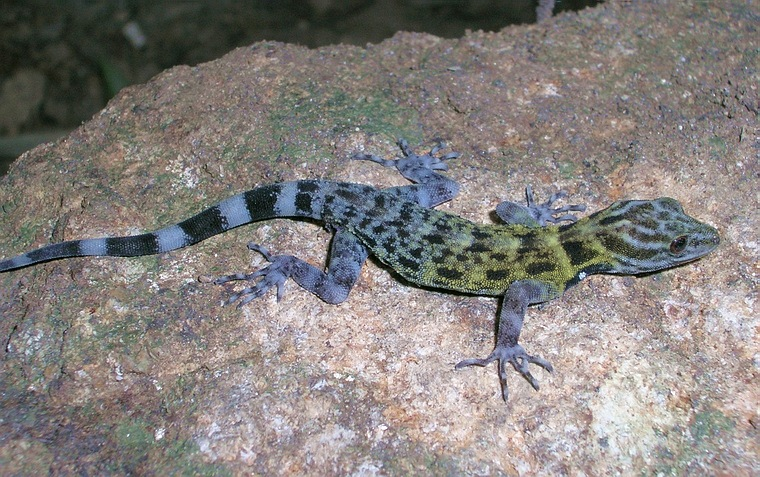

Conservation status
- Near Threatened (IUCN 3.1)

Scientific classification
- Kingdom: Animalia
- Phylum: Chordata
- Class: Reptilia
- Order: Squamata
- Suborder: Gekkota
- Family: Gekkonidae
- Genus: Cnemaspis
- Species: C. ornata

Binomial name
- Cnemaspis ornata (Beddome, 1870)

= Ornate day gecko =

Species of lizard

The ornate day gecko (Cnemaspis ornata) is a species of gecko found in southern India (Tirunelveli and Anaimalai Hills, Malabar, Travancore).
