= Beau-Vallon, Mauritius =

Beau-Vallon
- Village
- Location within Mauritius
- Coordinates: 20°25′29.72″S 57°42′9.77″E
- Country: Mauritius
- Districts: Grand Port District

Government

Population (2011)
  - Total: 6,904
  - Density: 681.5/km^{2} (1,765/sq mi)
- Time zone: UTC+4 (MUT)
- Area code: 230
- ISO 3166 code: MU

Beau-Vallon is a village in Mauritius located in Grand Port District. The village is administered by the Beau-Vallon Village Council under the aegis of the Grand Port District Council. According to the census by Statistics Mauritius in 2011, the population was 6,904.

== See also ==
- Districts of Mauritius
- List of places in Mauritius
