= Vieux Grand Port =

Village in Grand Port, Mauritius

Old Grand Port is a village in the Grand Port District of Mauritius. It was the first human settlement in Mauritius.

The Old Grand Port Historic Site is a National Heritage site, which contains the ruins of Fort Frederik Henrik, named after Frederik Henrik, Prince of Orange. The Dutch discovered Mauritius in 1598, and built the fort in 1638. When the Dutch abandoned Mauritius in 1710, they destroyed the fort. The island was claimed by the French in 1715, who settled in Old Grand Port in 1722, but later moved their administration to Port Louis. After 1753 they built on top of the ruins of Fort Frederik Henrik. Today the site is the Frederik Hendrik Museum.

In the 2000 census, the population of Old Grand Port was 2,779. In the 2011 census, the population was 2,969.
