= British Mauritius =

British colony from 1810 to 1968

Coordinates: 20.2°S 57.5°E

Colony of Mauritius
- 1810–1968
- Blue Ensign Coat of arms
- Motto: Stella Clavisque Maris Indici (Latin) ("Star and Key of the Indian Ocean")
- Anthem: God Save the King (1810–1837, 1901–1952); God Save the Queen (1837–1901, 1952–1968)
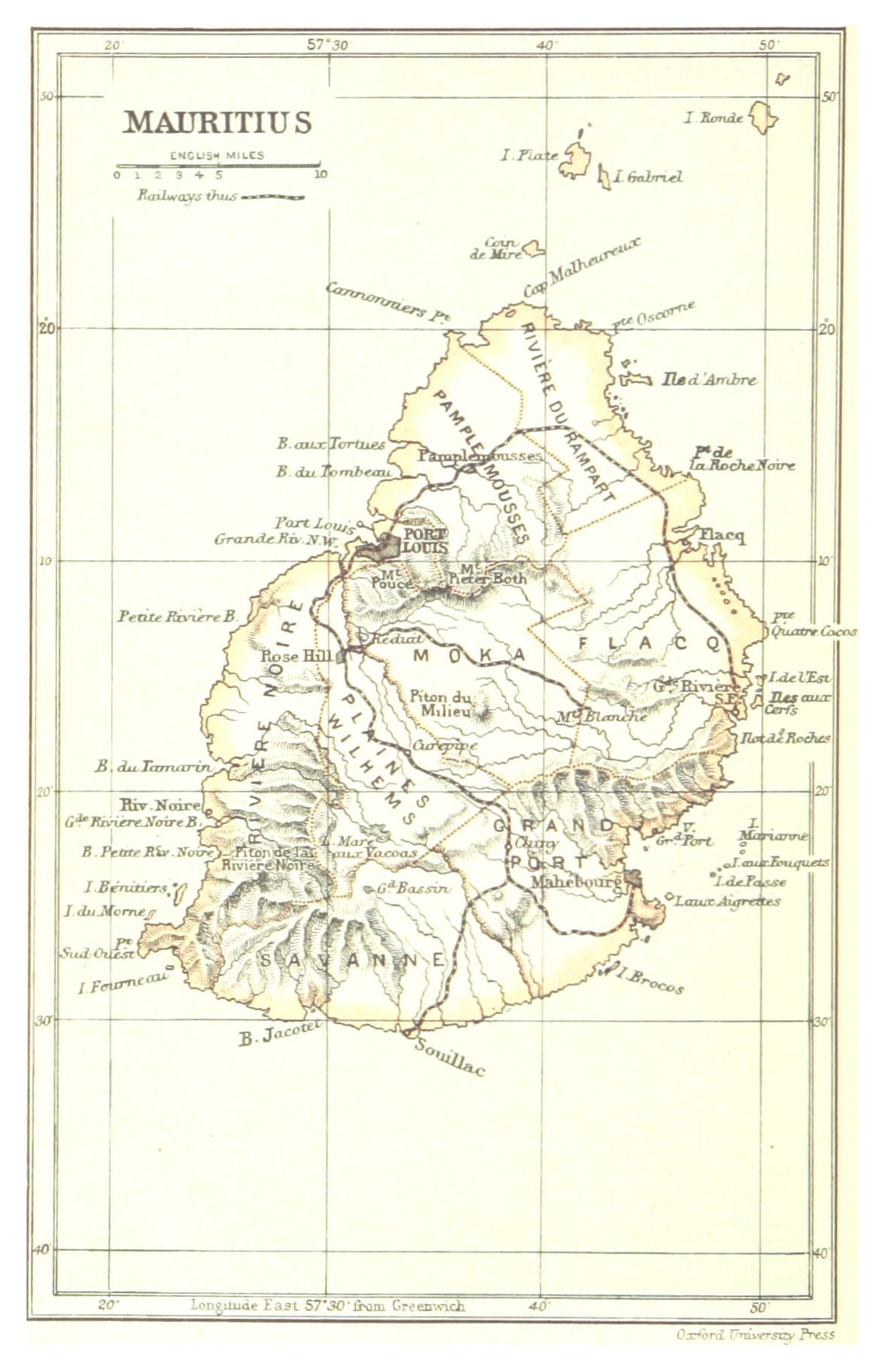
- Mauritius in 1888, with its districts and railways
- Status: Crown colony
- Capital: Port Louis
- Common languages: English (official); French; Mauritian Creole; Bhojpuri and other Indian languages
- Religion: Hinduism; Christianity; Islam
- Governor
  - 1810–1823: Robert Townsend Farquhar
  - 1962–1968: John Shaw Rennie
- Chief Minister (1962–1964) Premier (1964–1968)
  - 1962–1968: Seewoosagur Ramgoolam
- Legislature: Council of Government (1825–1948); Legislative Council (1948–1964); Legislative Assembly (1964–1968)
- History
  - Capitulation: 3 December 1810
  - Treaty of Paris: 30 May 1814
  - Council of Government: 1825
  - Abolition of slavery: 1 February 1835
  - Elected members (letters patent): 16 September 1885
  - Seychelles separated: 31 August 1903
  - New constitution: 9 December 1947
  - Chagos Archipelago detached: 8 November 1965
  - Independence: 12 March 1968
- Currency: Mixed currencies, including sterling and the Indian rupee (1810–1876); Mauritian rupee (1876–1968)
Preceded by
Isle de France
Succeeded by
Crown Colony of the Seychelles
British Indian Ocean Territory
Mauritius
- Today part of: Mauritius; Seychelles; British Indian Ocean Territory; Tromelin Island (Note: Tromelin Island was listed among the dependencies of Mauritius in the colony's almanac, the Colonial Office List and Admiralty sailing directions, and the colonial government leased it for guano extraction. It is claimed by Mauritius; France has occupied it since 1954 and administers it as part of the French Southern and Antarctic Lands.)

British Mauritius was the British Crown colony of Mauritius, from the capitulation of the French colony of Île de France on 3 December 1810 until Mauritian independence on 12 March 1968. British forces landed in the north of the island on 29 November 1810, and by the Treaty of Paris of 30 May 1814 France ceded "the Isle of France and its Dependencies, especially Rodrigues and Les Séchelles" to Britain; the island was renamed Mauritius. The colony was governed from Port Louis by a governor responsible to the Secretary of State in London. Besides the main island it comprised Rodrigues and the Lesser Dependencies, among them the Chagos Archipelago, Agaléga and St. Brandon, and, until 1903, Seychelles; Tromelin Island, now held by France, was listed among its dependencies in colonial and Admiralty publications and leased by the colonial government for the extraction of guano. The capitulation allowed the inhabitants to keep their "religion, laws, and customs", and French civil law survived under English-style courts, with English the language of the courts from 1847.

The slave trade was outlawed, but an illegal traffic brought tens of thousands of enslaved people to Mauritius and Réunion until the late 1820s. Slavery itself continued until the Slavery Abolition Act 1833 took effect in Mauritius on 1 February 1835, when 62,022 people were enslaved on the island. Slave owners and their creditors received about £2.1 million in compensation; nothing was paid to the enslaved, who were held as unpaid "apprentices" until 1839. From 1834 Mauritius was the site of the British government's "great experiment" with indentured labour: 451,796 Indians arrived between 1834 and 1910 through the immigration depot now known as the Aapravasi Ghat, a World Heritage Site, and people of Indian origin became the majority of the population between 1851 and 1861. Harsh pass and vagrancy laws led to the immigrants' petition of 1871 and to a royal commission of inquiry.

Sugar dominated the economy. After Britain equalised colonial sugar duties in 1825, output rose from 11,000 tons to more than 100,000 tons by 1854, and the record crop of 1963 was 685,600 tonnes. British merchant houses financed much of the industry, and by the 1950s sugar and its by-products made up more than 95 per cent of the colony's exports, much of them sold to Britain at prices negotiated under the Commonwealth Sugar Agreement. At independence the economy still depended on a single crop and on imported food, and GDP per capita, about $4,600 (in 2011 international dollars) in 1968, was only about a sixth higher than in 1950. The subdivision of estates made freed people, and later Indian former indentured labourers, into landowners. The malaria epidemic of 1866–1868, which killed more than 40,000 people, and the cyclone of 1892 were among the colony's worst disasters; the eradication of malaria after 1948 set off rapid population growth.

Political power long rested with a Franco-Mauritian planter elite and a narrow electorate: letters patent of 1885 gave the Council of Government ten elected members, but only about 4,000 people could vote in 1886. In the twentieth century the Creole middle class and Indo-Mauritians challenged that dominance; the Labour Party, founded in 1936, the Uba riots of 1937, the dock strike of 1938 and the Belle Vue Harel shooting of 1943 led to commissions of enquiry and the first labour legislation. The 1947 constitution enfranchised literate men and women, universal adult suffrage followed in 1959, and Seewoosagur Ramgoolam became Chief Minister in 1962 and Premier in 1964. After the constitutional conference of September 1965, detachment of the Chagos Archipelago to form the British Indian Ocean Territory on 8 November 1965, and the election of 1967, Mauritius became independent on 12 March 1968, with Elizabeth II as queen. The colony left Mauritius a Westminster-style constitution and appeals to the Judicial Committee of the Privy Council, a plural society shaped by slavery and indenture, and the dispute over the Chagos Archipelago.

== Background ==
=== Île de France and the British conquest ===
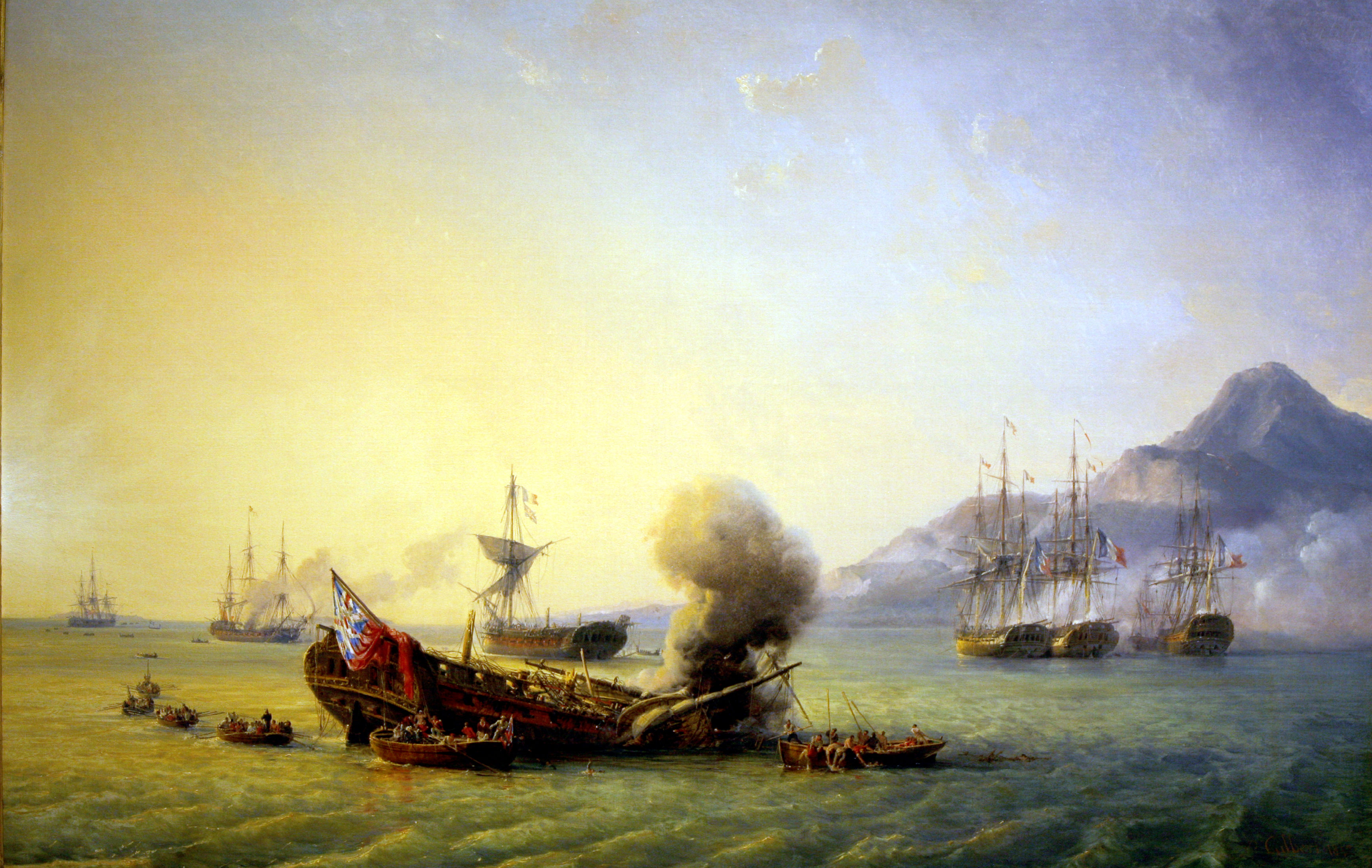
The Battle of Grand Port in August 1810, a French naval victory over a British frigate squadron, in a painting by Pierre-Julien Gilbert in the Musée de la Marine, Paris

An expedition of the French East India Company claimed Mauritius for France in 1715, and the company founded a settlement there named Île de France in 1722. The company governed until 1764, when the island passed to the French crown; Mahé de La Bourdonnais, governor from 1735 to 1746, built up Port Louis as the seat of French government in the region. The colony's wealth rested on slave labour: in 1797 it had about 59,000 inhabitants, of whom 49,100 were slaves, 6,200 white and 3,700 other free people. On the eve of the British conquest the enslaved population numbered between about 61,000 and 64,000, according to different counts. The settlers turned back the agents sent to enforce the French Republic's abolition of slavery in the 1790s, and Napoleon's governor, General Charles Mathieu Isidore Decaen, dissolved the colonial assembly in 1803.

During the Napoleonic Wars Île de France was a base for French warships and privateers, whose prizes taken between 1803 and 1810 the historian Auguste Toussaint valued at almost 50 million francs. Vice-Admiral Albemarle Bertie, commanding at the Cape of Good Hope, tightened the blockade under Captain Josias Rowley, and in 1809 a detachment of the 56th Regiment and sepoys under Lieutenant-Colonel Henry Keating sailed from Bombay to occupy Rodrigues as a base for the squadron. British forces took the neighbouring island of Bourbon (Réunion) on 9 July 1810, but in August a British frigate squadron was defeated in the Battle of Grand Port, fought from 20 to 28 August in the bay of Grand Port on the south-east coast. A French squadron under Captain Guy-Victor Duperré forced its way into the bay past the frigate Néréide and the British-held fort on Île de la Passe, and when the British attacked it on 23 August the frigates Sirius and Magicienne ran aground on the reefs; both were later abandoned and set on fire by their crews, and Néréide, which had fought the French flagship almost alone, was captured. When the last frigate, Iphigenia, and the fort on Île de la Passe surrendered on 28 August, some 1,700 British officers and men were taken prisoner.

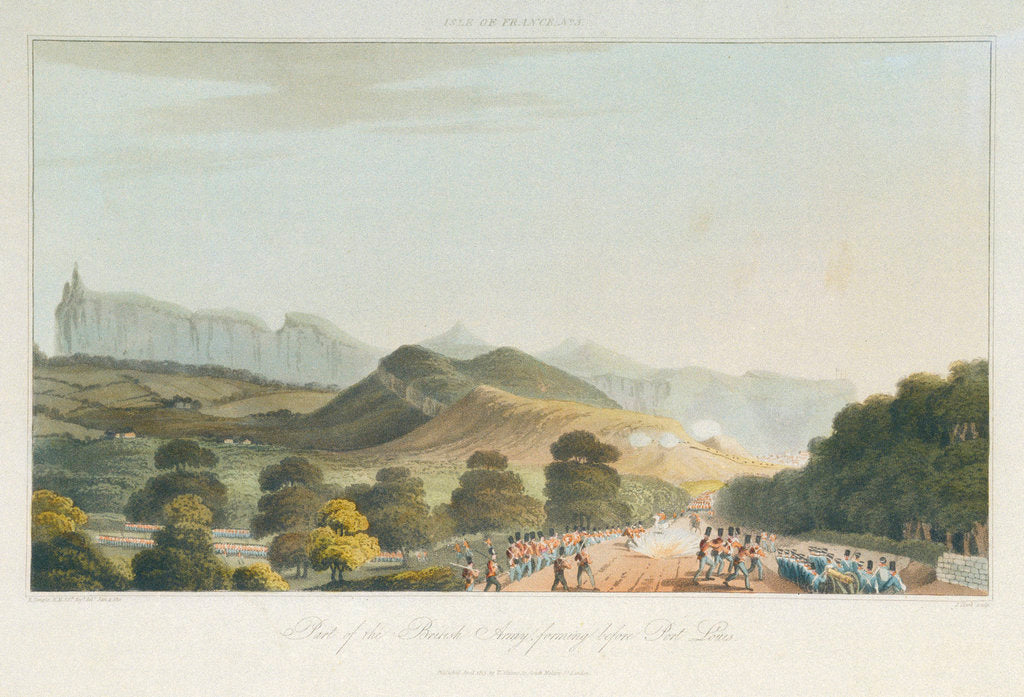
The British army landing on Île de France (left) and forming before Port Louis (right): two of the Eight Views of the Mauritius, which show the army's positions from 29 November to 1 December 1810, hand-coloured aquatints by J. Clark after Richard Temple, a private in the 65th Regiment, published in 1813

The divisions of the invasion force from India assembled at Rodrigues and sailed on 22 November 1810, without waiting for the division from the Cape. On 29 November a fleet of about seventy ships anchored in the channel between the islet of Coin de Mire and the north coast near Cap Malheureux, and some 10,000 troops landed at Grande Baie without opposition. As the army advanced on Port Louis, Decaen sent a flag of truce on 2 December. Commodore Rowley and Major-General Henry Warde negotiated for the British commanders, Bertie and Lieutenant-General John Abercromby, and on 3 December the capitulation was signed and British troops occupied Port Louis.

The capitulation surrendered "the Isle of France, and all its Dependencies". The French garrison was not made prisoner of war but was shipped to France at British expense, private property was to be respected, the colonists could leave with their property within two years, and article 8 provided that "The inhabitants shall preserve their religion, laws, and customs". The British reply to article 6 stated that the colony and its dependencies were ceded unconditionally, the negotiators having no power to decide their future. A British naval historian likened these lenient terms to the Convention of Cintra; the colonial historian Charles Pridham defended them as having secured the island without the losses of an assault. Mauritius's Truth and Justice Commission argued in 2011 that the capitulation "created the conditions" not only for the continuation of slavery until 1835 but also for "extensive corruption of the State apparatus".

== Early British rule (1810–1835) ==
=== Capitulation and the Treaty of Paris ===
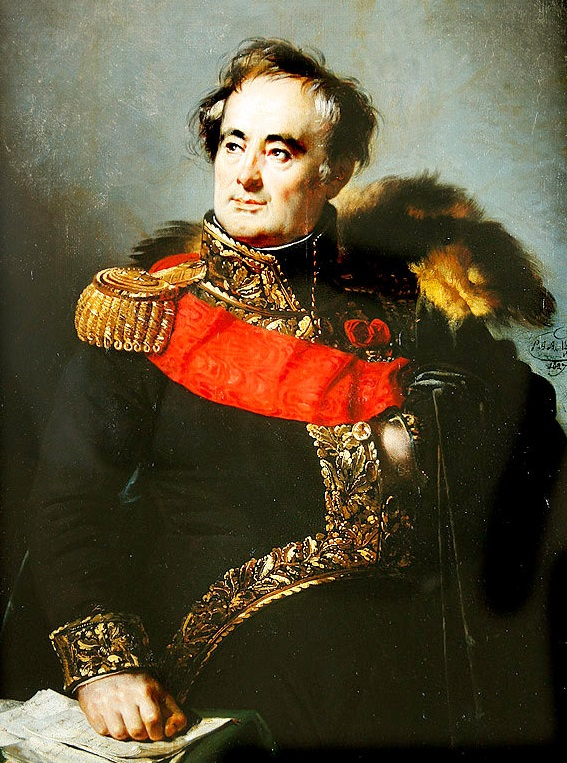
General Charles Decaen, whom Napoleon sent in 1803 to command the French possessions in the East, and who governed Île de France until the French capitulated to the British in 1810

Robert Townsend Farquhar, a former lieutenant-governor of Penang who had been named governor before the island was taken, settled there on 4 December 1810 and continued to oversee Bourbon. The French office of colonial prefect was abolished and the governor combined executive and legislative power, so that the colonial constitution decreed by the French Consulate in 1803 lapsed without replacement. Farquhar kept the French laws in force, as the capitulation required, but made the inhabitants swear an oath of allegiance to George III. The Seychelles, whose French commandant, Jean-Baptiste Queau de Quincy, had capitulated to British warships during the war, were formally taken over as a dependency of the new colony under a British agent; de Quincy served the British as justice of the peace for eighteen years. The French name was kept in official acts until Warde, acting governor in 1811, announced his appointment as governor of the "Mauritius" in a proclamation of 9 April 1811.

The Treaty of Paris of 30 May 1814 settled the island's status: by article VIII Britain restored to France most of the colonies it had held on 1 January 1792, but Louis XVIII ceded "in full right and Sovereignty" to the British crown Tobago, Saint Lucia and "the Isle of France and its Dependencies, especially Rodrigues and Les Séchelles". Bourbon was returned to France under the same treaty and handed over to French commissioners in 1815. Tromelin Island, which the treaty does not name, later became the subject of a dispute: Mauritius has claimed it since 1976 as one of the dependencies ceded in 1814, while France holds it as one of its scattered islands in the Indian Ocean.

=== Farquhar's administration ===
Farquhar governed with the help of a collector of customs and the commander of the troops, and left the French legal and administrative system in place. English became the official language, but French and Creole remained dominant, and few British settlers came to the colony. Port Louis lost its free-port status: closed to foreign shipping after 1814, it was reopened to foreign vessels, under restrictions, only in 1820. In 1816 a fire destroyed the principal street of Port Louis; Pridham put the value of the property lost at £1,200,000. A cholera epidemic in 1819–1820 killed, according to Pridham, nearly 12,000 people.

The French lycée of Port Louis, used as a military hospital after the conquest, was reopened as the Royal College, the forerunner of the Royal College Curepipe; the school dates the change of name to a decree of Farquhar of 27 January 1813, while the historian Vina Ballgobin dates it to 1817. From 1818 the so-called English scholarships, open only to white boys, sent the college's best pupils to study at British universities. Elementary schooling for the poor began with Jean Le Brun of the London Missionary Society, who arrived in 1814 and opened the first free primary school in Port Louis.

Farquhar tried to stop the slave trade at its source in Madagascar: on 23 October 1817 his envoys concluded a treaty with Radama I, the most powerful ruler on the island, who undertook to forbid the export of slaves from his dominions in return for an annual subsidy of money and military supplies worth £2,000; the British also recognised his royal title. Farquhar went on leave in November 1817, and until his return in July 1820 the colony was governed by Major-General Gage John Hall (November 1817 – December 1818), Colonel Dalrymple (December 1818 – February 1819) and Major-General Ralph Darling (February 1819 – July 1820). Hall attacked the slave trade by force, sending soldiers to search estates for newly imported slaves, dismissing French officials suspected of helping the traders, suspending the judges who objected and stopping Radama's subsidy. The Colonial Secretary, Lord Bathurst, generally approved but reinstated the judges, and Hall was recalled after a year. Darling also withheld the subsidy; after his return Farquhar renewed the treaty with Radama, adding education and technical help for the king's subjects, and in 1822 he obtained the Moresby Treaty, by which Said bin Sultan of Oman forbade the export of slaves from his East African dominions to non-Muslim lands. Farquhar, created a baronet in 1821, left Mauritius in 1823 and was succeeded by General Sir Galbraith Lowry Cole.

=== Suppression of the slave trade ===
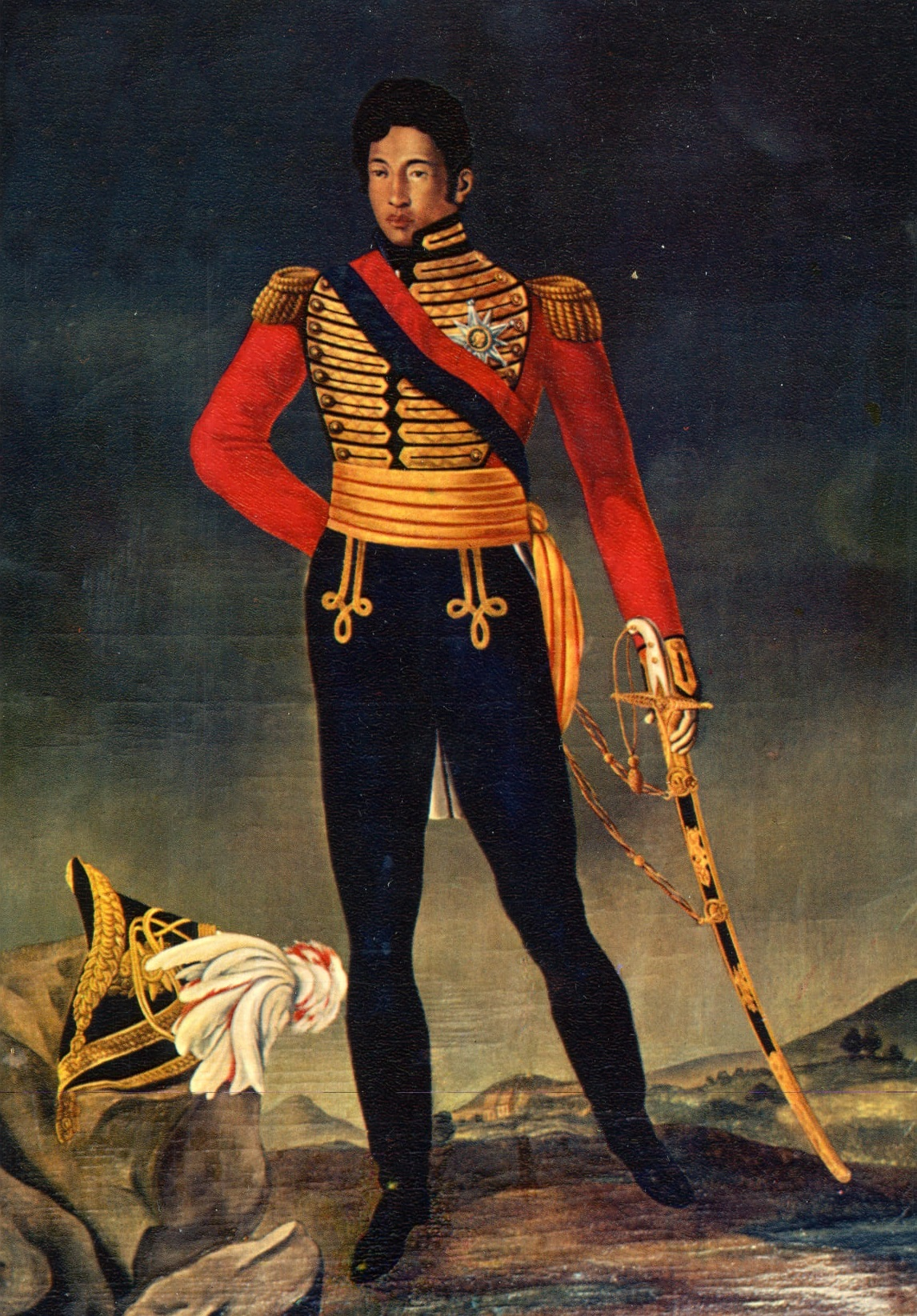
Radama I, ruler of Madagascar, with whom Governor Robert Townsend Farquhar concluded treaties against the slave trade

Britain had abolished its own slave trade in 1807, and in January 1813 Farquhar promulgated in Mauritius the Slave Trade Felony Act 1811, which made slave trading a felony. An Order in Council of 24 September 1814 required owners to register their slaves, so that any unregistered slave could be freed; but the registers compiled in 1815 and 1816 were not checked, and vague or fraudulent returns allowed owners to pass off newly imported Africans and Malagasy as registered slaves.

The trade nevertheless continued: slaves from Madagascar, Zanzibar, the Comoros and the East African mainland were landed at night on secluded parts of the coast, such as the Morne Brabant peninsula, or smuggled in through the Seychelles, whose slave population rose from about 2,500–2,800 in 1809 to almost 7,000 in 1815. The traders relied on a wide network of accomplices, white and black; smugglers escaped from custody or were acquitted by sympathetic juries, and up to September 1817 no one had been brought to justice under the Felony Act. The few British warships on the station left Mauritian waters during the cyclone season. Estimates of the traffic vary: Farquhar himself estimated in 1821 that 30,000 slaves had been brought into Mauritius since 1811; the Anti-Slavery Society put the figure at 50,000, a number Pridham called exaggerated; and the historian Richard Allen has estimated that between 50,000 and 65,000 slaves were landed illegally in the Mascarene Islands as a whole between 1811 and 1827. The illegal trade raised the share of Malagasy among the island's slaves to 36.8 per cent in 1826, from 25.1 per cent. The Truth and Justice Commission concluded that the colonial state "turned a blind eye to the illegal slave trade", with government officials sometimes involved in it.

Africans taken from captured slave ships, known as "prize negroes" or Liberated Africans, were not freed but apprenticed for fourteen years to private employers or to the government. Of the 2,998 brought to Mauritius between 1813 and 1826, 291 died before they could be apprenticed, and Farquhar and his circle hired 560 of the apprentices.

In Britain the abolitionist Thomas Fowell Buxton told the House of Commons on 9 May 1826 that the slave trade had been carried on in Mauritius since the conquest "upon a large scale, to the extent of thousands and tens of thousands", although he acknowledged that Hall had checked it during his short administration. Farquhar, by then a member of Parliament, blamed French slavers supplying Bourbon, and the House appointed a select committee of inquiry. Abolitionists accused Farquhar of having allowed some 50,000 slaves to enter Mauritius and Bourbon between 1814 and 1823. The Dictionary of National Biography later credited him with "determined and successful efforts to grapple with the evils of the slave trade", while the historian Moses Nwulia wrote that the failure to bring a single slave trader to justice by 1817 was "not a credit" to his administration.

=== Commission of Eastern Inquiry and reform ===
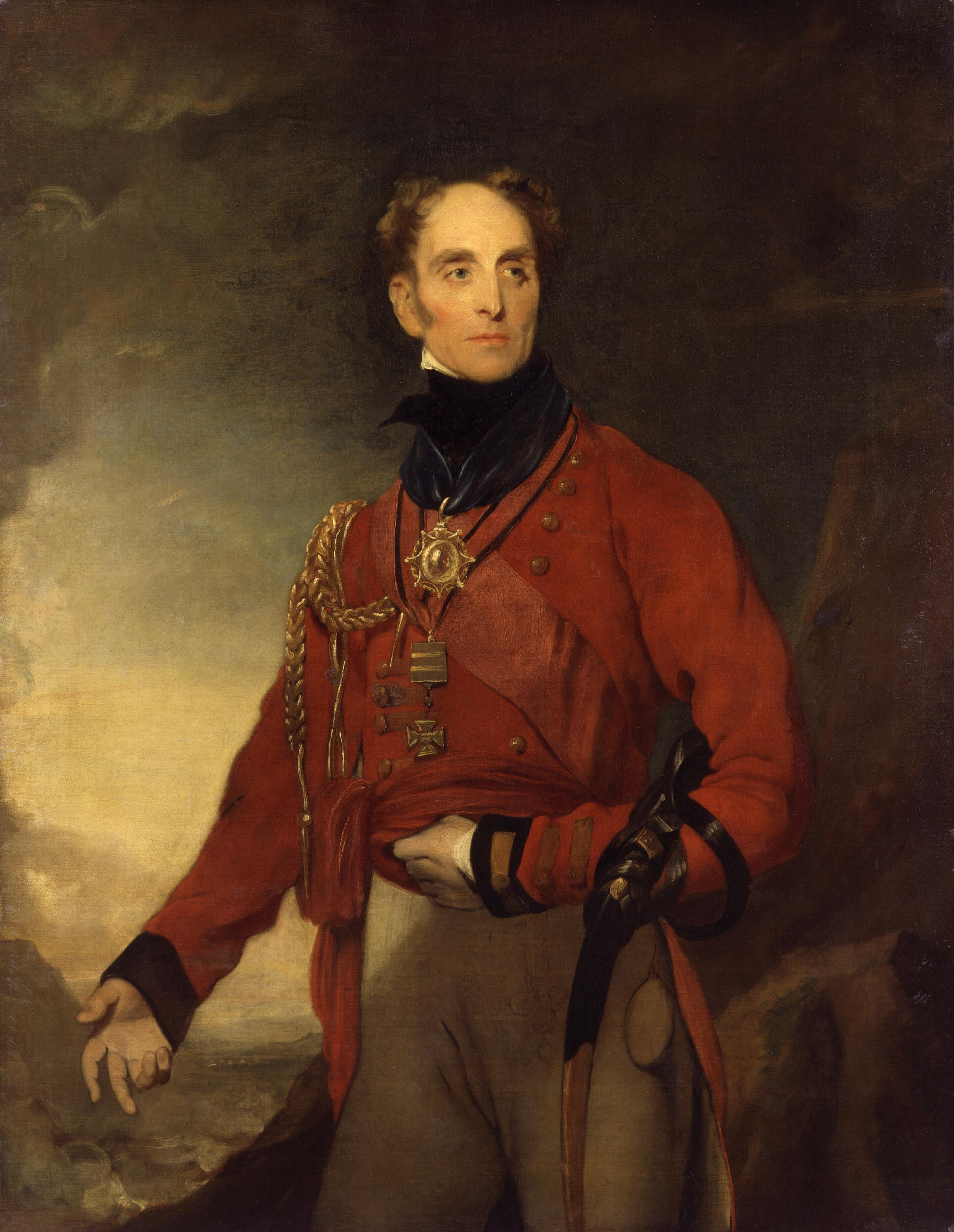
Sir Galbraith Lowry Cole, governor of Mauritius from 1823 to 1828

Under Cole, governor from 1823 to 1828, the sugar boom began: in 1825 Mauritian sugar was admitted to the British market on the same terms as West Indian sugar, and production rose from 11,000 tons that year to 21,000 tons in 1826. Letters patent of 9 February 1825 created a Council of Government of four officials, the chief justice, the colonial secretary, the second military commander and the collector of customs, to advise the governor, and laws now took the form of ordinances of the governor in council. A new registration of slaves, ordered in January 1826 and completed a year later, counted 69,264 slaves in Mauritius, 6,520 in the Seychelles and 782 in the other dependencies.

The British government also sent the Commissioners of Eastern Inquiry, William Colebrooke and his colleague Blair, to investigate the slave trade. Colebrooke, a member of the commission since 1823, had spent 1823 to 1826 at the Cape and was in Mauritius in 1827 and 1828. The commissioners' report on the slave trade, dated 12 March 1829, recommended an end to all "authorized" slave trading, such as the concessions Britain had granted to the Portuguese and the Omani Arabs, and the introduction of Chinese and other free labourers. It was scathing about the conduct of public officials: although it found no proof, it was convinced that civil servants had been complicit in the illegal trade and in hiding illegally imported slaves in the registry.

Under the imperial "amelioration" policy, Orders in Council of 2 February 1830 and 2 November 1831 laid down stricter rules on the treatment and punishment of slaves, enforced by a Protector of Slaves; planters resisted by refusing to submit punishment records and by delays in the courts. In October 1830 the colonists sent Adrien d'Épinay to London as their agent, and the Colonial Secretary, Lord Goderich, promised reforms. Under royal instructions of July 1831 a new Council of Government was installed in January 1832, with seven official members and seven unofficial members whom the governor nominated from among the leading merchants and inhabitants, and its second ordinance ended the censorship of the press.

=== The Jeremie affair and the free population of colour ===
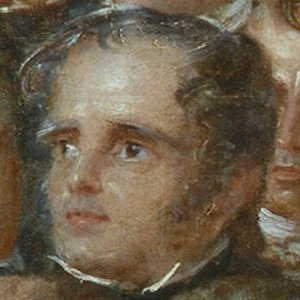
John Jeremie (left), an abolitionist appointed procureur-général of Mauritius in February 1832, who was prevented from landing at Port Louis until 4 June and was attacked by a mob in July; and Adrien d'Épinay (right), in a bust by Jean-Pierre Dantan made in London in 1834

The free population of colour, about 16,000 people in 1832 against some 63,500 slaves, had been granted political rights during the French Revolution but lost them under Napoleon; many of its members owned land and slaves, but they continued to face discrimination after 1810. Farquhar eased the French rules on manumission, hoping to build up a free intermediate class attached to the government and to the security of the whites. Segregation persisted in churches and cemeteries, and petitions of 1826 and 1830 for better schooling were largely ignored by Cole and his successor, Sir Charles Colville. In 1829 Colville promulgated an Order in Council abolishing the legal distinctions between whites and free people of colour; under Ordinance No. 57 of that year there were only two legal conditions, free and enslaved. Pridham wrote that the measure "produced little or no excitement" at the time, and saw it as part of a deliberate policy of dividing the planters' opposition by attaching the free coloured class to the government; the Truth and Justice Commission traced the later animosity between whites and the gens de couleur to the ordinance.

Opposition to emancipation came to a head in March 1832, when news reached the colony that John Jeremie, a former chief justice of Saint Lucia known for his anti-slavery writings, had been appointed procureur-général (attorney-general), together with the Order in Council of November 1831. Taking this as a sign that immediate emancipation was intended, and citing a series of fires that they blamed on slaves, though Nwulia thought the planters themselves may have had a hand in them, the planters obtained Colville's permission to form armed corps of volunteers. The Truth and Justice Commission, citing the historian Peter Burroughs, put this "armed resistance" at some 1,000 men. Jeremie landed on 4 June under military escort; shops closed, lawyers boycotted the courts, and addresses from every district demanded his removal. After an extraordinary meeting of the Council of Government with leading inhabitants advised that he withdraw, Colville ordered him to leave, and Jeremie sailed for England at the end of July.

The British government replaced Colville with Major-General Sir William Nicolay, banned armed associations by an Order in Council of November 1832 and sent Jeremie back. Nicolay disbanded the volunteers on 4 February 1833 and dismissed from the council those who had voted for Jeremie's expulsion, among them Prosper d'Épinay; Jeremie returned on 29 April 1833 on a warship carrying two regiments to reinforce the garrison. The colonists again sent Adrien d'Épinay, founder of the newspaper Le Cernéen, to London. In August 1833 Jeremie had five planters of Grand Port arrested for plotting to resist the government by force; after their acquittal of treason in March 1834 the Colonial Office, displeased with his conduct towards the judges, dismissed him, together with his ally John Reddie, president of the lower court, and Jeremie left the colony in October 1834. In Nwulia's judgement the episode passed "without effecting any meaningful change in the status quo". Slavery was abolished in the colony on 1 February 1835 (see below).

The gens de couleur continued to press for equal treatment: in the 1840s the journalist Rémy Ollier, writing in La Sentinelle, called for their representation on the Council of Government, their admission to the civil service and the admission of more boys of colour to the Royal College.

== Slavery, abolition and indenture ==
=== Slavery under British rule ===
Le Morne Brabant, in an engraving by Karl Girardet after a sketch by Alfred Erny, published in 1863; in the 18th and early 19th centuries runaway slaves (maroons) took refuge on the mountain

Under French rule the colony's labour system had rested mainly on slavery, and in the early nineteenth century there were about 60,000 enslaved people, who still made up some two-thirds of the population at emancipation in 1835. The figures for privately owned slaves were, in the demographer Robert René Kuczynski's words, "most uncertain and contradictory", ranging between 60,817 and 80,185 in 1811–1820 and between 61,187 and 69,315 in 1822–1828. An Order in Council of 24 September 1814 set up a registry of slaves, whose main purpose was to detect slaves imported after the abolition of the trade; it came into force in the colony on 1 May 1815, and the slave owners' reluctance meant that the first registration was not completed until 1816. After a further Order in Council of 30 January 1826 tightened the system, Governor Sir Lowry Cole reported in January 1827 that the new registration had counted 69,004 slaves on the island. The registrar of slaves estimated that 3,384 of those registered in 1826 had been introduced illegally.

Of the slaves registered between October 1826 and January 1827, half had been born in Mauritius, 28 per cent in Mozambique, 18 per cent in Madagascar and 4 per cent in India or the Malay world. Men had been more than twice as numerous as women in 1811–1814, and manumission was rare: Cole reported in 1828 that it had averaged 84 a year from 1815 to 1826. After Britain equalised the duties on sugar from all its colonies in 1825, Mauritian production rose from 11,000 tons in 1825 to 21,000 tons in 1826 and passed 100,000 tons by 1854. The Truth and Justice Commission found that the enslaved bore the cost of this expansion: slaves were sold or hired between estates, separating families, women, children and the elderly were moved into field work, and hours in the fields and mills lengthened. A study for the commission of the heights of 3,739 slave children recorded in 1826 found them far below modern reference standards, which it linked to malnutrition, disease and hard work. Epidemics of measles, cholera, beriberi and dysentery struck in 1815–1820, and the returns for 1827–1834 show about 2,200 deaths a year, a death rate of about 37 per thousand. Using notarial records of slave sales, the commission estimated the value of slave labour at about £1 million a year in 1823–1825, £3 million in 1826–1830 and £2 million in 1831–1835.

Under the policy of "amelioration" adopted by the House of Commons in 1823, the Colonial Office told Cole to end the flogging of women, regulate other punishments and ease manumission, but he was slow to act. Ordinance No. 43 of 1829, in force from 20 March 1829, created a Protector of Slaves, with assistant protectors in the districts, over the objections of the planters' Colonial Committee. Some 647 slaves lodged formal complaints with the protector between 1832 and 1835, records that the historian Vijaya Teelock used in Bitter Sugar to describe life on the sugar estates. An Order in Council of 23 February 1831 forbade the use of chains to hold slaves in custody.

Many slaves resisted by running away: according to the International Council on Monuments and Sites (ICOMOS), maroons rose from about 4–5 per cent of the enslaved in the 1770s to 11–13 per cent by the 1820s. The diarist B. H. de Froberville estimated in 1832 that 3,000 slaves had escaped since chains were forbidden, a figure Kuczynski considered "probably an overstatement". Le Morne Brabant, a mountain in the south-west whose cliffs sheltered groups of maroons in the eighteenth and early nineteenth centuries, became a symbol of the struggle against slavery and was inscribed as a World Heritage Site in 2008. A legend first published by Bernardin de Saint-Pierre in 1773 holds that slaves leapt to their deaths from the mountain rather than be retaken, although ICOMOS notes that it is impossible to jump from it into the sea.

=== Abolition, apprenticeship and compensation ===
The planters sent Adrien d'Épinay to London, where he spent a year lobbying for a promise that there would be no abolition without compensation for the owners. The Slavery Abolition Act 1833 came into force in the British West Indies in August 1834 and in Mauritius and its dependencies on 1 February 1835. On that date there were 62,022 slaves in Mauritius: 1,009 children under six were freed outright, 9,084 were classed as aged or infirm, and 51,929 became "apprentices". (Note: The Truth and Justice Commission gives 61,022 slaves in Mauritius in 1835.) Under an Order in Council of 17 September 1834, apprentices had to work unpaid for their former owners for forty-five hours a week, field workers for six years and others for four, with imprisonment and flogging as penalties for absence or poor work. The historian Moses Nwulia concluded that the Act "abolished chattel slavery" but "endorsed serfdom in its place". Apprentices resisted by running away, some 9,000 of them according to the Truth and Justice Commission, and many bought their freedom before their terms ended.

When the Colonial Secretary, Lord Glenelg, pressed in 1838 for apprenticeship to end early, as it had in Antigua and Barbados, the Council of Government refused, arguing that it would upset property transactions made on the faith of the Act. The non-field apprentices were freed on 1 February 1839, and under an Order in Council of 1838 the field apprentices were freed on 31 March 1839, releasing about 30,000 labourers from the sugar estates.

Parliament voted £20 million to compensate slave owners in the Caribbean, Mauritius and the Cape, with each award fixed according to the enslaved person's sex, age, work and skill and the productivity of the colony. The owners in Mauritius, together with the British merchant houses that had lent to them, received about £2.1 million. A field labourer was valued at £93 and a skilled slave at £137–142, and owners were also paid for children and for the old and sick. Sources differ on the number of people for whom compensation was paid, from 66,517 to 68,613 including the dependencies. (Note: The Truth and Justice Commission gives 66,517, including the dependencies, while a government notice of 8 December 1835 cited by Kuczynski gives 68,613.) Nothing was paid to the enslaved. The Truth and Justice Commission argued that much of the money went into sugar estates and banks, including the Mauritius Commercial Bank founded in 1838, while the freed people received "nothing but freedom".

The freed people left the estates in large numbers. Governor Sir William Nicolay complained that many had "mistaken idleness for freedom", while the planters, who had brought in some 25,000 Indian labourers by the end of 1838, made little effort to keep them. The historian Marina Carter and the Truth and Justice Commission have argued instead that the planters' policy of cheap imported labour, which paid Indian workers far less than apprentices asked for their extra work, drove the freed people off the estates. By 1841 most ex-apprentices had stopped working on sugar estates; some 3,725 still did in 1844, and only 1,890 in June 1847. Many became smallholders, fishermen, artisans, carters, domestic servants or dock workers, over a quarter lived in Port Louis, and many bought plots of land in the "petit morcellement" that followed abolition. The censuses of 1846 and 1851 counted 49,365 and 48,330 "ex-apprentices"; in 1861 the category was merged into the "General Population", the governor explaining that most adults who had been enslaved had died and that their children had largely intermarried with other groups. The Truth and Justice Commission, which reported in 2011, concluded that the exclusion of slave descendants in modern Mauritius "originated at the time of abolition of slavery", and recommended memorials, a slavery museum in Port Louis and the protection of sites associated with slavery.

=== Indentured immigration ===
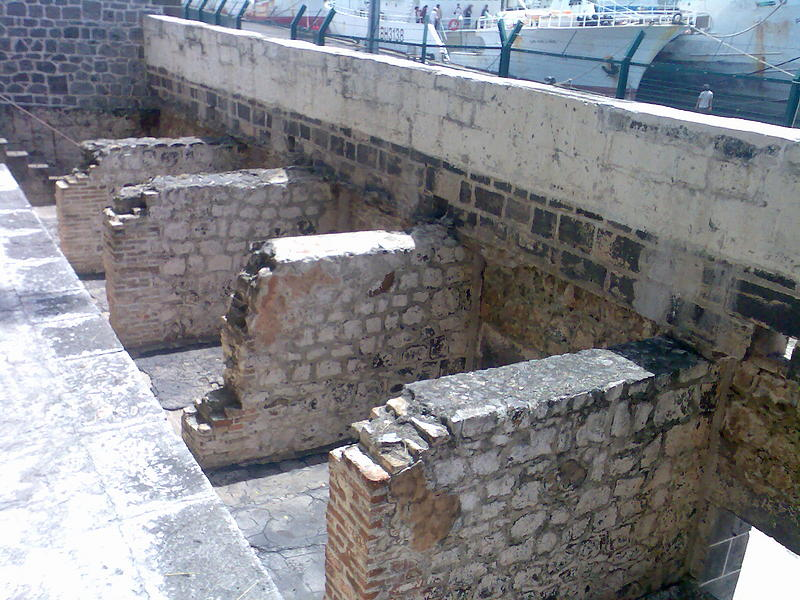
Remains of the latrines of the immigration depot at the Aapravasi Ghat, Port Louis, built in 1849 to receive indentured labourers; almost half a million arrived there from India between 1834 and 1920

Planters had tried Indian contract labour before abolition: d'Épinay brought Indian workers to his estate in 1825, and more than a thousand arrived in 1829, but most were sent back after disputes over unpaid wages. In 1834 the British government chose Mauritius as the first site of what it called "the great experiment" in using contracted "free" labour in place of slaves. The ship Atlas arrived on 2 November 1834 with 36 "Hill Coolies" from the hills of Bihar, who had signed five-year contracts with the firm of Arbuthnot in Calcutta at five rupees a month; with 39 men from Bombay, they were officially counted as the first emigrants from India. About 25,000 Indians, nearly all men and more than half from tribal groups such as the Oraon, Munda and Santal, arrived between November 1834 and April 1839.

Reports of fraudulent recruitment, overcrowded ships and ill-treatment led the government of India to suspend emigration to Mauritius on 29 May 1839. After Mauritius passed ordinances to pay for and regulate immigration, an Indian act of 2 December 1842 reopened it under government supervision: a Protector of Immigrants was appointed in Mauritius, emigration agents were posted at Calcutta, Madras and Bombay, and the colonial government met the cost of the passages. In 1843 alone 34,525 Indians arrived. Contracts were generally for five years, with wages of about five rupees a month, rations, free housing and medical care. Between 1834 and 1910, 451,796 Indian labourers (346,036 men and 105,760 women) were brought to Mauritius, 339,706 of them in 1843–1866, and 157,539 people left for India or elsewhere in the same period. (Note: UNESCO describes the total as "almost half a million" arrivals between 1834 and 1920.) Most were recruited in Bihar and the North-Western Provinces, with smaller numbers from the Tamil and Telugu districts of southern India. According to a report by George Grierson in 1883, 215,713 immigrants had been entitled to a free return passage and 80,007 had used it.

From 1849 new arrivals passed through an immigration depot at Trou Fanfaron in Port Louis, which at times held as many as 1,000 people while they were registered and allotted to employers. Its remains, the Aapravasi Ghat, were inscribed as a World Heritage Site in 2006.

Labour and vagrancy laws were used to keep "old immigrants", those who had completed their first contract, on the estates. An ordinance of 1847 obliged old immigrants to carry a ticket, and one of 1852 introduced "vagrant hunts" in which the police swept the countryside and arrested Indians found off the estates. In most years between 1861 and 1871, between 11 and 17 per cent of the male Indian population was arrested for vagrancy. The Labour Law of 1867 (Ordinance 31 of 1867) required every old immigrant not under written contract to obtain a police pass and to carry a ticket bearing his photograph, and allowed arrest without warrant. Wages were reduced by the "double cut", the deduction of two days' pay for each day of absence, which was given legal sanction in 1847 and 1862 and abolished only in 1908.

=== Conditions and inquiries ===
In 1871 more than 9,000 old immigrants signed a petition against these abuses, presented with a pamphlet by the planter Adolphe de Plevitz. The Colonial Office told Parliament that a commission had been appointed "at the request of the Mauritius planters", declined to publish its correspondence on a proposal to expel de Plevitz from the island, and said that the governor, Sir Arthur Gordon, believed in "the general well-being and good treatment of the labourers". The commissioners, Frere, who had led an inquiry in Demerara, and Williamson, of the Northern Circuit, took evidence between 1872 and 1874 and visited 51 sugar estates. According to Lord Kimberley's summary in the House of Lords, they found that the Protector of Immigrants had no effective powers and that, while many estates treated their labourers well, on others deductions from wages were arbitrary and excessive, that hospitals were unsatisfactory and some estates systematically harsh, and that the vagrant hunts "differed very little from slave hunts"; they could not say that the immigrants' condition was better than in India. They also condemned the non-payment of wages and the abuse of the double cut. The Colonial Office endorsed most of the recommendations, and Ordinance 12 of 1878 removed the harshest provisions of the 1867 law, although prosecutions for vagrancy continued and the penal clauses of the labour law were repealed only in 1922.

Mahatma Gandhi visited Mauritius in 1901, and the lawyer Manilal Doctor, who worked in the colony from 1907, helped to awaken political consciousness among Indians. Manilal Doctor's demand to the royal commission of 1909 for the recognition of Hindu and Muslim religious marriages was met by an ordinance of 1912. That commission, headed by Sir Frank Swettenham and appointed to examine the colony's finances, labour and immigration, found that the double cut, the non-payment of wages and ill-treatment persisted, favoured ending indentured immigration, and noted that the Indian majority had no representatives in the legislature. A parliamentary committee under Lord Sanderson recommended in 1910 that indentured emigration to Mauritius should cease, and 1910 is the last year of arrivals in the official registers. About 1,395 further labourers arrived in 1923–1924, more than half of whom soon chose to return to India, and recruitment ended after an Indian official, Kunwar Maharaj Singh, reported against it in 1925.

=== Other migrants ===
Africans taken from slave ships by the Royal Navy were landed as "liberated Africans" or "prize negroes" and indentured to private employers or government departments for up to fourteen years. An official report of 1826 counted 2,998 landed between 1813 and 1826, of whom 291 died before being placed; almost a third of all of them died in service, and arrivals continued into the 1860s, one of the last ships, the Manuella, landing 730 Africans in 1860. From 1815 to 1837 the government also used convicts from India and Ceylon on the roads; the last of them were freed in 1853 on condition that they did not return to India. After 1839 employers recruited smaller numbers elsewhere: between 1839 and 1857 some 4,601 workers came from Madagascar, 320 from the African coast, 433 from Aden and 206 from the Comoros.

A "Camp of the Chinese" existed in Port Louis by 1817, and from the 1820s Chinese merchants, led by a trader named Hayme with the support of Governor Farquhar, settled in the colony. Attempts to use Chinese plantation labour in 1829 and the early 1840s were short-lived. The 1861 census counted 1,904 people born in China, and the highest number ever returned, in 1931, was 5,529 born in China and Hong Kong. By the twentieth century Chinese shops were found in almost every village and estate.

=== Demographic change ===
The censuses of 1846 and 1851 distinguished the General Population, the ex-apprentices and the Indian immigrants; from 1861 they recognised only an Indian population, of unmixed Indian descent, and a General Population of everyone else. People of Indian origin became the majority between 1851 and 1861, and formed between 68 and 71 per cent of the population from 1871 to 1921. More than half the population had been born in India in 1859–1865, but less than 0.3 per cent by 1944. Kuczynski warned that the census categories understated the population of Indian descent, as Indians who became Christians were increasingly counted in the General Population.

General and Indian population at the censuses, 1846–1952
Census	General population (Note: Including the Chinese.)	Indian population	Total	Indian share
1846	102,217	56,245	158,462	35.5%
1851	102,827	77,996	180,823	43.1%
1861	117,416	192,634	310,050	62.1%
1871	99,784	216,258	316,042	68.4%
1881	110,881	248,993	359,874	69.2%
1891	114,668	255,920	370,588	69.1%
1901	111,937	259,086	371,023	69.8%
1911	111,094	257,697	368,791	69.9%
1921	110,961	265,524	376,485	70.5%
1931	124,589	268,649	393,238	68.3%
1944	153,938	265,247	419,185	63.3%
1952 (Note: Preliminary count; the General Population figure combines 159,158 General and 15,757 Sino-Mauritian.)	174,915	322,972	497,887	64.9%

The 1962 census counted 681,619 people, and at the end of 1964 Indo-Mauritians were estimated at 67.2 per cent of the population (50.9 per cent Hindu and 16.3 per cent Muslim), the General Population at 29.5 per cent and Sino-Mauritians at 3.3 per cent.

== Government and administration ==
=== Governor and Colonial Office ===
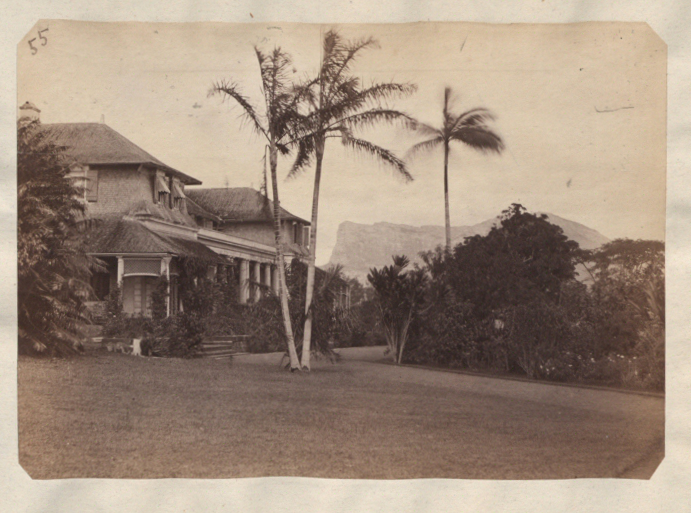
Government House, Port Louis, with a view of the town from the Citadel (left), and Le Réduit, the governor's country residence (right), photographed between 1880 and 1899

Mauritius was governed as a Crown colony. The Colonial Office List defined a Crown colony as one "in which the Crown has the entire control of legislation, while the administration is carried on by public officers under the control of the Home Government", and it placed Mauritius among the colonies, acquired by conquest or cession, in which the authority of the governor's council rested on the will of the Crown. In London the colony came under the Secretary of State for War and the Colonies until 1854, when the war and colonial departments were separated and a Colonial Office proper came into being; in August 1966, nineteen months before Mauritian independence, the Colonial Office was merged with the Commonwealth Relations Office to form the Commonwealth Office. Official communication between the colony and Britain passed between the governor and the secretary of state.

The governor held his commission from the Crown as governor and commander-in-chief of Mauritius and its dependencies. His control over legislation was close: the royal instructions of 1831 provided that no ordinance could be made and no question discussed in the Council of Government unless the governor proposed it, and gave him a casting vote. Even after elected members had joined the council, the constitution as revised in 1933 empowered him to override a majority vote in order to enforce any measure he considered necessary "in the interest of public order, public faith or other essentials of good government". Alongside the Council of Government, the legislature, sat an Executive Council of senior officials. In 1913 it consisted of the governor, the officer commanding the troops, the Colonial Secretary, the Procureur and Advocate-General and the Receiver-General; two unofficial members were added in 1933. The Colonial Secretary was the head of the civil service and the governor's chief adviser on administrative and political matters, while a Financial Secretary advised on finance; by the 1960s the office was styled Chief Secretary.

Port Louis was the capital and seat of government, and Government House was among its principal public buildings. The governor also had a country house at Le Réduit, in the Moka district, where in the 1840s his family lived until the social season in town began at the end of June. In the view of the historian Anthony Toth, colonial rule "amounted to a thin layer of British administrative and judicial officials attempting to preside over an assertive and powerful Franco-Mauritian elite", some of whose members were themselves senior police officers and magistrates. By 1949 all the colony's law and judicial officers except one puisne judge were Mauritian-born. When the colony's finances were in difficulty, London sent out inquiries and supplied loans or grants: a royal commission in 1909 and a financial commission in 1931 examined the administration and the public finances, and loans or grants were obtained after the cyclone of 1892, in 1908, in 1930 and after the cyclones of 1945.

=== Councils and the franchise, 1825–1947 ===
Medal of Sir John Pope Hennessy, governor of Mauritius, by Oscar Roty, 1888. His constitution of 1886 added ten elected members to the Council of Government, on a franchise limited to wealthy property owners

The Council of Government created in 1825 and reconstituted in 1832 with seven official and seven nominated unofficial members (see above) remained wholly appointed until 1885. According to the Government of Mauritius, the seven unofficial members of 1831 were all Franco-Mauritians, representing the planter and merchant aristocracy.

Letters patent of 16 September 1885, introduced under Governor John Pope Hennessy, created a council of 27 members: eight officials sitting ex officio, nine members nominated by the governor, at least a third of whom were not to hold public office, and ten elected members, two for Port Louis and one for each of the eight rural districts. Where the ten non-official members voted together on a question of finance or of purely local concern, the official vote was not counted. To vote, a man had to own immovable property of an annual value of Rs 300 or movable property worth Rs 3,000, pay a monthly rent of Rs 25 or an annual licence duty of Rs 200, or earn a salary of Rs 50 a month; husbands of qualified wives and the eldest sons of qualified widows could also vote. At the first elections, held in January 1886, about 4,000 people out of a population of 360,000 could vote. Members were unpaid and could speak in either French or English. By 1890 two elected members also sat on the Executive Council, but by 1913 it was again made up only of officials.

Registered electors under the 1885 constitution
Date	Registered electors	Population of Mauritius	Electors per 100 inhabitants (Note: Calculated from the figures in the table. The 1911 total is the sum of the census categories given in the Colonial Office List for 1913; the 1931 figure excludes the dependencies.)
January 1886	about 4,000	about 360,000	1.1
c. 1889	4,242	–	
1 January 1912	5,985	377,083 (1911 census)	1.6
31 December 1934	10,099	393,238 (1931 census)	2.6
December 1947	11,799	about 419,000 (1944 census)	2.8
Sources: Government of Mauritius; Colonial Office List; Colonial Reports

The property qualifications confined the vote to a small, wealthy minority: Toth puts the electors at about 2 per cent of the adult population, and the Government of Mauritius states that "The mass of the population was totally deprived of any form of participation in the political process", the vote being reserved to sugar planters, merchants and other moneyed classes. Women could not vote until the post-war constitution. In its pleadings before the Chagos arbitral tribunal, Mauritius described the slightly more than 11,000 registered electors of 1947, in a population of nearly 420,000, as "largely made up of wealthy Franco-Mauritians".

The constitution was amended in July 1933: at least two-thirds of the nominated members now had to be unofficials, who in practice were allowed a free vote, and the Executive Council was opened to unofficial members. Under the 1933 constitution the register never exceeded 12,000 electors. The council elected in 1936 sat until June 1948, its life prolonged first by the war and then by the slow negotiation of a new constitution, which took effect under letters patent, royal instructions and an Order in Council of December 1947 (see below).

=== Law and the courts ===
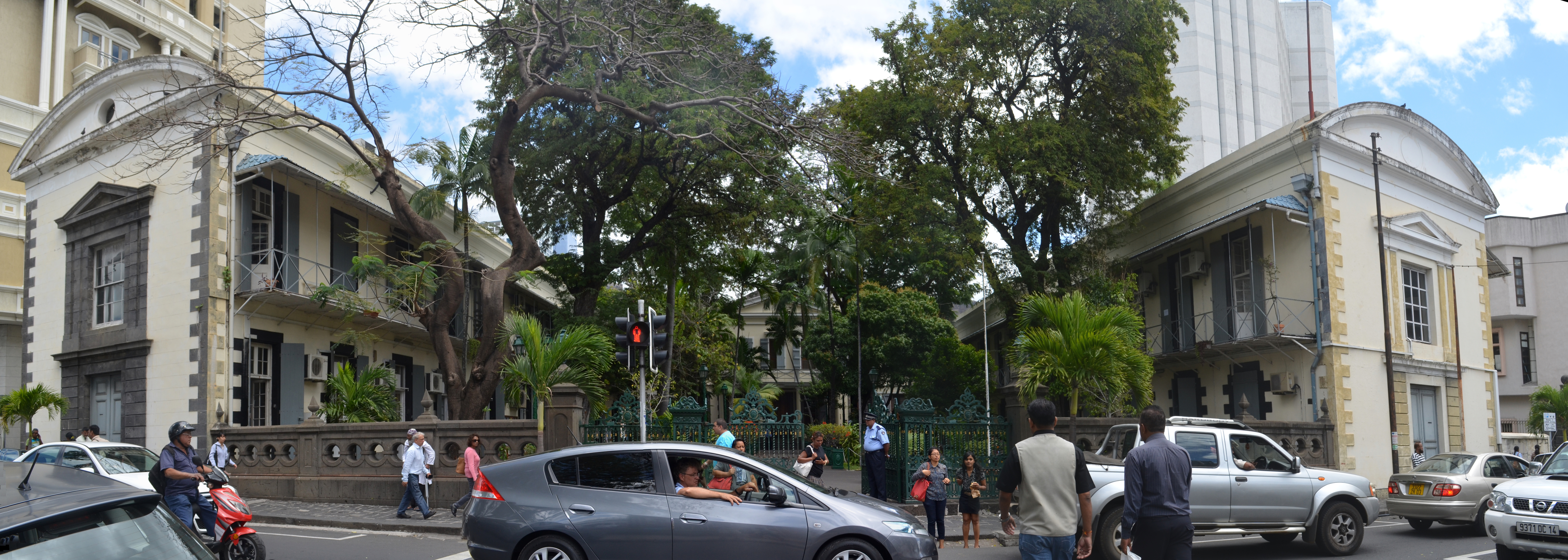
The Supreme Court of Mauritius building, Port Louis, in 2015

Because the capitulation of 1810 guaranteed the inhabitants their laws, French law remained in force throughout British rule. The Civil Code, the Penal Code, the Code of Commerce and the Code of Civil Procedure, with amendments to suit local conditions, were still largely in force in 1949; bankruptcy law, the law of evidence, civil and criminal procedure and labour law, however, were mostly English.

At the conquest the existing French courts were kept, but justice was delivered in the king's name and appeals lay to the King in Council in cases worth more than 4,000 piastres. An Order in Council of 13 April 1831, which Pridham calls the Charter of Justice, reduced the Cour d'Appel to three judges, styled the chief judge and first president, the vice-president and the assistant judge; abolished the office of grand judge (commissaire de justice); forbade the judges to own slaves or slave-worked land; and allowed civil appeals to the King in Council in cases worth more than £1,000 or affecting a person's freedom. English was imposed as the language of the courts in stages. An Order in Council provided that English alone should be used in the courts after 1847, a step the island's press called premature, although Pridham noted that the colony had been warned fifteen years earlier; according to the Supreme Court, a decree of 1845 ended the use of French as the ordinary language of the courts from 15 July 1847. Legislation introduced in 1850 and approved in 1851 abolished the court of first instance and replaced the Cour d'Appel with a Supreme Court, while keeping the right of appeal to the Privy Council.

By 1949 the Supreme Court consisted of a chief justice and two puisne judges and had the powers of the English Court of King's Bench, together with admiralty and equity jurisdiction; it also heard appeals from the Supreme Court of Seychelles, and appeals from its own judgments lay to the Privy Council in certain cases. Its judges presided over the Assize Court, where a jury of nine decided by a majority of at least seven; district magistrates dealt with lesser civil and criminal cases, an intermediate court of three magistrates with more serious offences, and an Industrial Court with labour disputes. The result was a mixed system that outlasted colonial rule: a committee chaired by Lord Phillips of Worth Matravers wrote in 2020 that Mauritian substantive law "is essentially derived from the French civil and penal codes, whereas its laws of procedure and evidence are derived from England".

=== Local government, police and defence ===
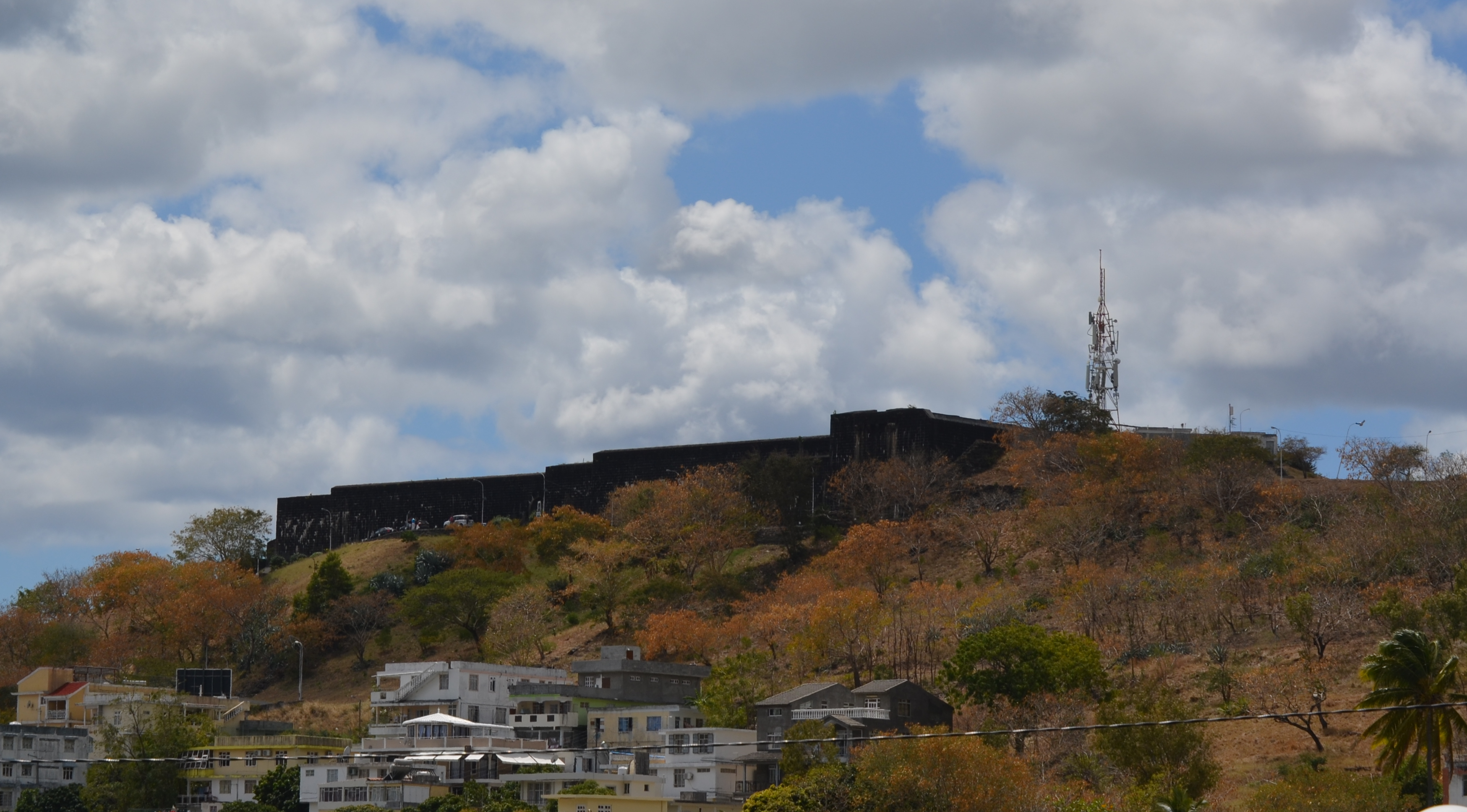
Fort Adelaide, the citadel built by the British between 1830 and 1840 on a hill overlooking Port Louis and named after Queen Adelaide, photographed in 2015

Port Louis received a municipal corporation under an ordinance passed by the council in 1849, and its first annual elections were held in 1850, when 18 councillors were returned for the town as a whole; by the 1940s the mayor and deputy mayor were elected by the council, subject to the governor's confirmation. The malaria epidemics of the 1860s drove many of the better-off to the healthier uplands of Plaines Wilhems, where Curepipe, a scattered village in 1865, was by 1895 large enough to have a town board. Boards of commissioners were set up for Curepipe in 1889 and for Beau Bassin and Rose Hill and Quatre Bornes in 1895, all their members being nominated each year by the governor. According to the colonial report for 1949, local government in the rural districts began only in October 1946, when a civil commissioner was appointed for Grand Port and Savanne; forty village councils were formed in 1947, and there were eighty by 1949.

The police dated from the French period, and after 1810 a British officer, A. W. Blane, took command of the existing force. A gendarmerie on the French model was formed in 1816, commanded jointly by a British and a French officer until 1818 for reasons of language. A commission of inquiry in 1859 led to the amalgamation of the police with the municipal police under an Inspector General of Police, a title changed to Commissioner of Police in 1934; the force was governed by a Police Ordinance of 1893. After a political riot in 1911 the police began elementary military training and gradually became a semi-military force, and in 1922 its headquarters moved to the Line Barracks in Port Louis.

The British garrison, several regiments strong in the early years, had been reduced by 1870 to half a battalion, and was cut further after 1914. The colony paid towards its cost: in the late 1930s it contributed 5½ per cent of its revenue, £48,650 in 1936–37. By the late 1950s the garrison battalion was the 26th Battalion of the King's African Rifles; the disbandment of 1 (Mauritius) Coast Battery of the Royal Artillery in February 1957 completed the run-down of the garrison, and from July that year the garrison came under the East Africa Land Forces Organisation. A Mauritius Naval Volunteer Force had been raised in 1949. In 1960 the British government withdrew the garrison after some 150 years, and the Special Mobile Force was formed for internal security from volunteers with Second World War experience and selected police officers; it took over the King's African Rifles' barracks at Vacoas, renamed Abercromby Barracks after the general who had led the conquest of 1810. The 1965 constitutional conference agreed that a defence agreement would be negotiated before independence, providing among other things for the continued use by Britain of its facilities at HMS Mauritius and Plaisance airfield.

=== Dependencies ===
British dependencies around the Indian Ocean in 1888. Until 1903 the Seychelles and other islands north of Madagascar were part of the colony of Mauritius, whose other dependencies included Rodrigues, the Chagos Archipelago and the St Brandon islands

In 1890 the dependencies of Mauritius comprised about a hundred islands with some 17,000 inhabitants, in four groups: Seychelles, the Amirantes, the "Oil Islands" and St Brandon, and a number of detached islands. Ordinances of 1852 and 1853 empowered the governor, and then the governor in Executive Council, to extend the colony's laws to "the Seychelles Islands and other Dependencies of Mauritius", adapted to local circumstances.

Seychelles, the most important dependency, was gradually separated from Mauritius. A Board of Civil Commissioners was appointed in 1872, when the finances of Seychelles were separated from those of Mauritius, and in 1888 an Administrator was appointed, with executive and legislative councils, though still subordinate to the Governor of Mauritius. In 1897 the Administrator was given the full powers of a governor, so that "Seychelles was practically separated from Mauritius", and letters patent of 31 August 1903 made it a separate Crown colony under its own governor. Coëtivy and Farquhar were later transferred from Mauritius to Seychelles, (Note: The Colonial Office List dates the transfer of Coëtivy to letters patent of 1907 and that of Farquhar to 1922; the United Kingdom's 2013 pleading in the Chagos arbitration gives 1908 and December 1921.) and the Supreme Court of Mauritius continued to hear appeals from Seychelles.

Rodrigues was administered by a civil commissioner who was also a police magistrate, under the instructions of the governor, and its laws took the form of regulations made by the governor in Executive Council. By the 1930s it was in the charge of a magistrate; its population was estimated at 9,977 at the end of 1937 and about 19,500 in the mid-1960s.

The Chagos Archipelago and Agaléga, known as the "Oil Islands" from the coconut oil they produced, formed with St. Brandon the Lesser Dependencies of Mauritius. The islands were privately owned plantations whose managers were appointed as peace officers, with limited police powers, and as civil status officers. A district magistrate was appointed for them in 1872, regular visits began in 1875, and an ordinance of that year created a police and stipendiary magistrate who was to visit the islands to administer justice; a Lesser Dependencies Ordinance of 1904 provided for district and stipendiary magistrates. In practice, the High Court in London found in 2003, "visits by Mauritian officials were rare and the Magistrate was at best an annual visitor". Diego Garcia, where commercial companies had set up coal depots for passing steamers, was placed under a magistrate with a small police force in 1885, but the police were withdrawn in 1888. The Lesser Dependencies had 1,457 inhabitants at the 1931 census and about 2,000 in the early 1950s.

The United Kingdom administered the Chagos Archipelago as a dependency of Mauritius until 8 November 1965, when an Order in Council detached it and combined it with Aldabra, Farquhar and Desroches, taken from Seychelles, to form the British Indian Ocean Territory. The Lesser Dependencies that remained with Mauritius were Agaléga and St Brandon.

Tromelin Island, which the 1814 treaty does not name, was described by the colonial historian Charles Pridham in 1849 in his chapter on the dependencies, and appeared as "Isle de Sable" in the "List of the Dependencies of Mauritius" printed in the colony's almanac for 1851, which was published under the authority of the government, and as "Tromelin or Sandy Island" in a list of the dependencies taken from an 1880 report by the colony's magistrate for the smaller dependencies. The Colonial Office List named it in its account of the dependencies between 1890 and 1903, among the islands it grouped under St Brandon, and Admiralty sailing directions included it among the islands of the government of Mauritius in 1884 and among those "attached as dependencies" to the colony in 1911 and 1946, the 1946 edition calling it "a dependency of Mauritius". The colonial government leased the island for the extraction of guano, and a Crown land lease of 1946 describes "the Island called Tromelin or Sandy Island, a Dependency of Mauritius"; the Blue Book for 1907 records goods shipped from Mauritius to the island among the colony's trade with its dependencies. The Mauritian Truth and Justice Commission wrote in 2011 that Tromelin, like Rodrigues, St Brandon and the Chagos, had "formed part of Mauritius before Independence". France, which holds that the island has been French since its discovery in 1722 and has occupied it since building a weather station there in 1954, disputes the value of these documents and states that the British authorities did not protest at its acts of administration before Mauritian independence, such as a decree of 1960 placing the island under its ministry for overseas departments. The independence legislation of 1968 defined Mauritius as the territories that constituted the colony immediately before independence, without listing the islands; Mauritius has claimed Tromelin since 1976, added it to the statutory definition of its territory in 1980 and named it in the constitution from 1992. In 2012 the chairman of the French Senate's foreign affairs committee said that Britain had abstained from taking a position in the dispute, and a France–Mauritius framework agreement of 7 June 2010 on the joint management of the island and its waters left the question of sovereignty open.

== Economy ==
=== Sugar ===
A sugar factory, in an engraving by Karl Girardet after a sketch by Alfred Erny, published in 1863; by the mid-nineteenth century Mauritius was Britain's main sugar-producing colony

Sugar became the colony's dominant industry under British rule, creating a monocrop export economy. The Navigation Acts at first restricted the island's trade after the conquest, but their temporary suspension from 1816 allowed sugar to be shipped to France, and in 1820 Port Louis was made a free port. The decisive change came in 1825, when Britain equalised the duty on sugar from all its colonies, ending the advantage that West Indian sugar had enjoyed in the British market. Production rose from 11,000 tons in 1825 to 21,000 tons in 1826 and passed 100,000 tons by 1854; Mauritius was then Britain's main sugar-producing colony, and between 1855 and 1859 it produced 9.4 per cent of the world's sugar cane. Food crops declined as sugar spread, and land became concentrated in large estates.

The expansion was financed largely from Britain. Planters mortgaged their estates to British credit and merchant houses to buy machinery; according to Adrien d'Épinay, more than 150 steam engines for sugar works were imported between 1826 and 1829. By the early 1830s British traders and financiers who advanced credit to the planters effectively owned around three-quarters of the sugar estates, according to the Truth and Justice Commission.

From the 1860s the industry faced falling prices as bounty-fed European beet sugar spread and Britain, committed to free trade, removed the last tariff preferences on colonial sugar by 1874. Mauritian exports to Britain fell from 70,000 tons in 1870–1874 to 14,000 tons in 1895–1899, and planters turned to markets in India, Australia and South Africa. Output, which had reached a normal yield of nearly 130,000 metric tons before 1867, fell to about 120,000 tons for some twenty-five years; after the mills damaged by the cyclone of 1892 were rebuilt with cheap loans, it rose to nearly 250,000 tons by 1909. Owners cut costs by merging their factories. There were 255 sugar mills in 1858, 59 factories in 1914, and only 23 by 1963.

The collapse of world prices after 1920 brought the industry close to ruin. Production fluctuated between 200,000 and 250,000 tonnes from 1919 to 1935, and the colonial and British governments made repeated loans to keep estates solvent; by 1931 the industry owed five loans totalling Rs 20 million, on which it could pay neither principal nor interest. A run of bumper crops raised output to 319,695 tonnes in 1938. After the Second World War, higher prices and new cane varieties such as M.134/32 brought a series of record crops, reaching 580,372 tons in 1959. The Commonwealth Sugar Agreement, signed on 21 December 1951, committed Britain to buy a fixed quota of Mauritian sugar each year, at first 335,000 long tons, at a price negotiated annually to be reasonably remunerative to producers. In 1953 the industry took over the government's Sugarcane Research Station as the Mauritius Sugar Industry Research Institute, established by Ordinance No. 9 of that year. In 1963 the crop reached a record 685,600 metric tons, and sugar cane covered 90 per cent of the cultivated land; the colonial report for that year remarked that "sugar means more to Mauritius than wool did to England in the days of the Merchant Guilds".

=== Mauritius and the British economy ===
When the Mauritius Trade Bill came before Parliament on 21 March 1825, the President of the Board of Trade, William Huskisson, said that he did not expect "any serious prejudice" to West Indian planters, "as the quantity of sugar grown in that island is not considerable". Mauritian sugar, which had sold in London with difficulty at 26 shillings a hundredweight in 1823, fetched up to 58 shillings in 1827, and the equalisation of duties brought a sixfold increase in exports to Britain. According to Patrick Neveling, Mauritius quickly became "the main sugar exporter in the imperial market". Britain restored a tariff preference for colonial sugar after 1919, but because it was tied to the world price it gave only partial protection, and from 1928 higher duties on refined sugar obliged Mauritius to sell raw sugar to British refiners rather than produce white sugar of its own. During the Second World War Britain bought all Commonwealth sugar, an arrangement extended to the end of 1952, when the Commonwealth Sugar Agreement took over; the quantity Britain undertook to buy each year under the agreement, the negotiated price quota, was 380,000 long tons in 1967, at £47 10s a long ton. The Truth and Justice Commission argued that Britain delayed the agreement "at the expense of its sugar-exporting colonies", and that the estate and factory owners "reaped most of the benefits" of it, accumulating the capital they later invested in tourism and the export processing zone. In 1963 almost all the sugar went to the United Kingdom and Canada, the United Kingdom alone taking Rs 290.7 million of the colony's Rs 427.8 million of exports, while Britain, whose goods entered at preferential rates of duty, was the main supplier of machinery, vehicles and other manufactures.

London merchant houses provided much of the industry's capital: between 1840 and 1847 most of the money entering the colony came from large London merchants to whom the crop was consigned, and who advanced working capital to the estates on its security; in 1848 four of the five London houses that financed much of the crop went bankrupt. Reid, Irving & Co. subscribed $85,000 of the capital of the Mauritius Bank, and according to the Truth and Justice Commission there was a "flow of capital back to Britain" through the bank, especially to that firm; the firm, which failed in 1847, owned five estates on the island. The Northern and Midland railway lines, which cost £1,066,795, were paid for by loans from the British government, the Longridge report having recommended a loan provided that the machinery was bought in Britain. By 1909 three British companies owned 13 of the island's 141 estates of more than 40 hectares, but the Royal Commission of that year saw little prospect of large new investment of British capital. Financial commissioners reported in 1931 that "a considerable part of the profits is said to have disappeared in purely private expenditure and some of it to have found investment outside the colony". White estate owners traditionally invested much of the industry's profits in Europe and South Africa, according to the Truth and Justice Commission, and in the 1950s private capital outflows averaged about Rs 6 million a year, almost 10 per cent of gross domestic capital formation, and in 1964 the government taxed transfers of capital overseas.

British credit houses shared in the £2.1 million paid in compensation for the enslaved, and representatives of Reid, Irving and of Barclay helped the planters' delegate, Adrien d'Épinay, to gain access to the Colonial Office. According to the Legacies of British Slavery database, John Irving of Reid, Irving acted with David Barclay as unpaid agent for Mauritius and was instrumental in obtaining compensation for the owners. The Truth and Justice Commission argued that the planters and the British credit houses, backed by the colonial state, turned to India for very cheap labour so as to avoid paying the freed people reasonable wages or giving them land and housing. The estate owner P. E. de Chazal told the Royal Commission of 1909 that "as a whole the Indian immigrant is introduced to keep down the price of labour", and the Truth and Justice Commission concluded that unemployment and poverty were "engineered and sustained by the plantocracy and the Colonial State to ensure the availability of cheap labour". The historian Richard Allen has argued that the sale of estate land to Indian immigrants was a way for financially squeezed estates to tap the immigrants' savings. The economist Jeffrey Frankel, by contrast, writes that although the indentured labourers' "lot was hard, most of them chose it voluntarily because the conditions were better than what they were leaving behind".

Mauritius was taken because of its strategic importance to the British Empire, according to the Truth and Justice Commission, and the British valued it, in Frankel's words, "as a coveted way station on the route to India and the Far East". A handbook of 1914 described it as having been "of much strategical importance to the British" before the opening of the Suez Canal in 1869, and still "of great political value in view of the possible blocking of the Canal in time of war". As Britain prepared in the 1960s to withdraw its forces from east of Suez, it detached the Chagos Archipelago from the colony (see below).

The British government lent the sugar industry £200,000 in 1927, and after the cyclone of 1931 it guaranteed a loan of £750,000 for planters, householders and repairs to government property, on condition that a financial commission visit the island to devise a balanced budget. (Note: The Truth and Justice Commission describes the 1931 loan as one of £500,000 granted by the British government.) Colonial Development and Welfare grants provided Rs 5.1 million of the Rs 15.0 million spent on the post-war Ten-Year Plan in 1952–53. Of the Rs 334.7 million projected in 1963 for the reconstruction and development programme of 1960–65, which followed the cyclones of 1960, Rs 150.8 million was to come from local resources and about Rs 125 million in British loans and grants, including Rs 72.2 million for cyclone housing. In 1967, after a deficit caused mainly by spending on relief works for the unemployed, Britain agreed to provide Rs 17 million towards the recurrent budget and a further Rs 20 million for development, on top of Rs 20 million already promised. According to the Truth and Justice Commission, the British authorities were eager to ensure that after independence Mauritius "would not become a burden to the British Exchequer".

=== Land, labour and the petit morcellement ===
Cane harvesting at the foot of Les Trois Mamelles, 1956. Through the sale of the less productive parts of the estates from the 1870s, Indians came to own about 35 per cent of the cultivated land by 1921

After the end of apprenticeship many estate owners subdivided land and sold it in small plots, a process known as the petit morcellement. It began in earnest in 1839, was most intense until 1846 and had run its course by 1850. The buyers were mainly former apprentices and gens de couleur: about 40 per cent described themselves as craftsmen or artisans, and most paid the full price when the sale was completed. Many of the plots, however, remained undeveloped for lack of capital and were later sold to Indian "Old Immigrants".

Indians who had completed their indentures bought land from the 1840s, and from about 1875 their purchases grew into the grand morcellement, in which estates sold their less productive land in lots; Indian buyers took part as purchasers, as agents for Franco-Mauritian owners and as large landowners themselves. The sales raised capital for the modernisation and centralisation of the factories. Indian land purchases were worth Rs 8.5 million between 1888 and 1894, almost 60 per cent more than in 1864–1887, and a further Rs 10.3 million between 1895 and 1900. Indian smallholders had 27,928 arpents under cane in 1910, about a fifth of the cane area, and by 1920 Indian smallholders and estate owners together held 54,000 arpents. According to Anthony Toth, Indians owned about 35 per cent of the cultivated land by 1921.

The morcellement created a class of Indian small planters, which grew to about 40,000 in the twentieth century. By the end of the nineteenth century there was also an Indian commercial bourgeoisie and a middle class of job contractors, sirdars, traders, moneylenders and medium planters. In 1963 estates with factories still produced about 62 per cent of the crop, while some 26,000 smaller, mostly Indo-Mauritian, planters cultivated about 19 per cent of the cane land, often with the help of their families. About 67,000 workers were employed in the industry during the harvest and 55,000 between harvests.

=== Trade, ports and communications ===
Mauritius in 1906, showing the railway network, from the second edition of C. P. Lucas's Historical Geography of the British Colonies; the first railway opened in 1864, and by about 1910 the government owned and worked over 120 miles of line

Indian immigration created new trade with India: demand for Indian textiles and foodstuffs grew, Indian commercial houses opened branches in Port Louis, and sugar was exported to British India. The opening of the Suez Canal in 1869 shifted shipping routes away from the Indian Ocean.

The planters of the Chamber of Agriculture, faced with high costs of carting machinery by road, pressed for railways. An engineer, Longridge, surveyed the island in 1858, and the Council adopted his report in February 1859. The first line of the Government Railways opened in 1864. By 1914 the system had two main lines from Port Louis, the North line to Grand River South East and the Midland line across the central plateau to Mahébourg, and four branches, with 120 miles of standard-gauge track in all. Road transport later replaced the railways. By 1963 the sugar crop from the south went to Port Louis by road, and the last section of line, to the east, was due to close in 1964.

A submarine cable of the Eastern Telegraph Company, opened at the end of 1893, linked the island to the world telegraph network. In 1942 the government decided to build an airfield at Plaine Magnien, near Mahébourg. This was the origin of Plaisance Airport, now Sir Seewoosagur Ramgoolam International Airport.

=== Currency and banking ===
The Oriental Bank on the Place d'Armes, Port Louis, photographed between 1880 and 1899

The British at first kept the French colonial coinage, including the silver piastre struck by Governor Decaen in 1810. From 1820 they issued anchor coinage, silver coins based on the Spanish dollar for use in British colonies. Several units were current at once: the capital of the first bank in 1813 was expressed as 2,000,000 livres, the equivalent of 400,000 sicca rupees or 200,000 dollars. Coin was chronically scarce, and the banks complained in the 1840s that Indian labourers, paid in coin, hoarded it and took it home to India. In 1849 the imperial government set up a Board of Commissioners of Currency, the first of its kind, which ended the issue of notes by competing banks. An Order in Council made the rupee the only legal tender from 1876. (Note: Toth dates the adoption of the Indian rupee as the official currency to 1876; in a speech in 2017 the governor of the Bank of Mauritius gave 1877 as the year in which the rupee became the national currency.) By 1963 the rupee was worth 1s 6d sterling.

Governor Farquhar encouraged the founding of the first bank, the Bank of Mauritius, in 1813, but it failed in 1825. The Mauritius Bank, founded in 1832 with British capital, collapsed in 1847 together with its London backers, Reid Irving & Co. The Mauritius Commercial Bank was promoted by British merchants, led by Blyth Brothers, together with local planters and traders. It was authorised by proclamation on 6 July 1838 and opened in September. In 1963 four commercial banks operated: the Mauritius Commercial Bank, the Mercantile Bank, Barclays Bank D.C.O. and the Bank of Baroda. A central bank, the Bank of Mauritius, was created by an ordinance of 1966 and established on 1 September 1967. It took over the functions of the currency board in August 1967, and within weeks it faced the devaluation of sterling, to which the rupee was pegged.

=== Epidemics, cyclones and depression ===
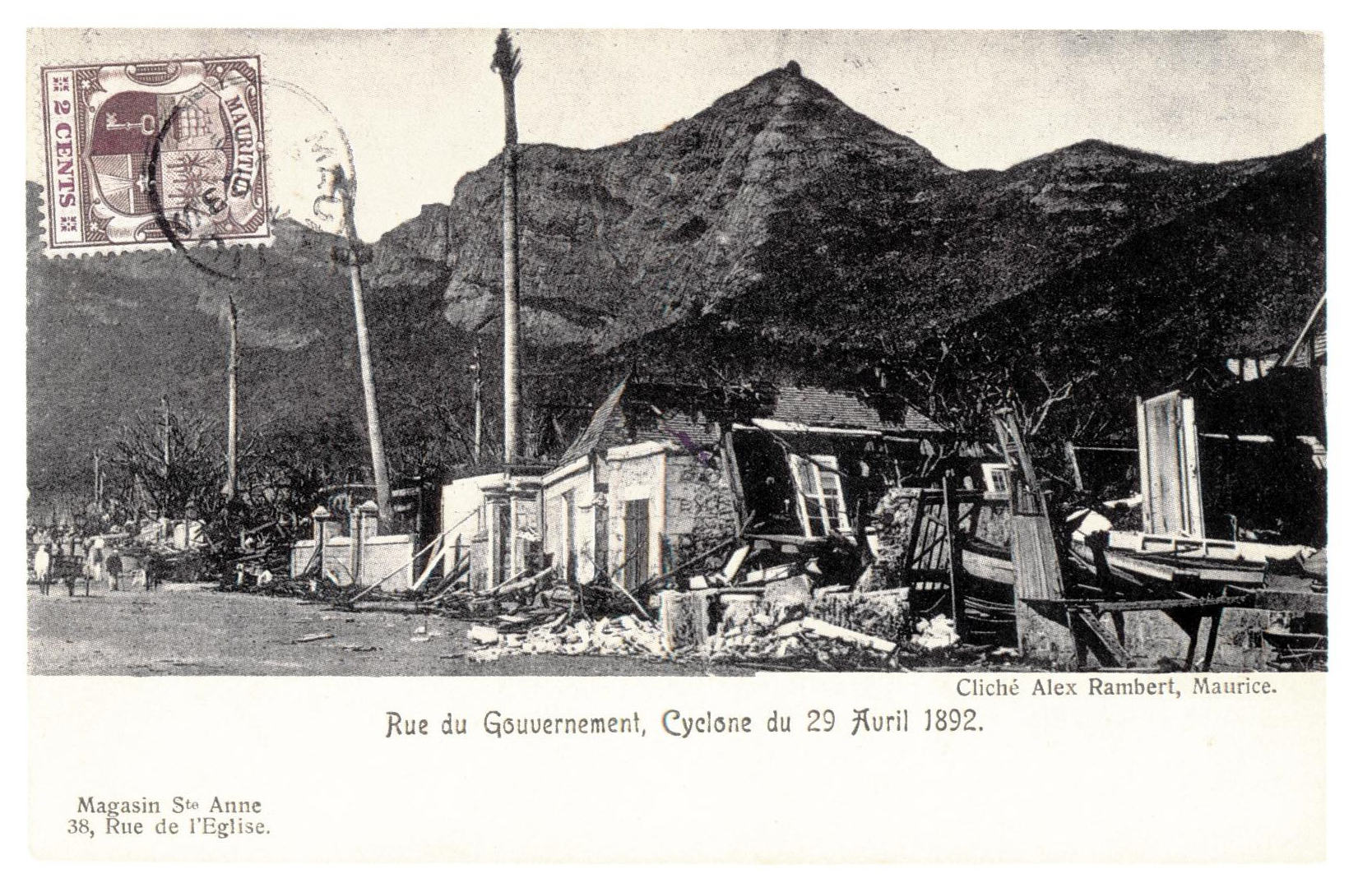
Rue du Gouvernement, Port Louis, after the hurricane of April 1892, which caused immense destruction and serious loss of life (left); and the cover of Ronald Ross's Report on the Prevention of Malaria in Mauritius (right). A malaria epidemic had killed more than 40,000 people between 1867 and 1869

Cholera, probably brought by an immigrant ship, broke out in Port Louis in May 1854. It returned in 1856 and killed more than 3,500 people in four months, and it recurred until 1862. Malaria, previously almost unknown on the island, became epidemic in 1866. In 1867 fever was recorded as the cause of 31,920 deaths in a population of about 360,000, and the death rate rose from 32 per thousand in 1866 to 120.5. In Port Louis a quarter of the inhabitants died that year. Over the whole epidemic more than 40,000 people died. Quinine soon ran out, and the well-to-do left Port Louis for the higher and healthier districts of Plaines Wilhems and Moka, giving rise to the populous towns of those districts; malaria remained endemic. Bubonic plague arrived in January 1899 and returned every year. By 1908 it had caused about 5,000 deaths. There was an influenza epidemic in 1919.

A hurricane in March 1868 caused great damage to buildings and plantations and carried away two spans of the railway viaduct over the Grand River. The cyclone of 29 April 1892 destroyed a third of Port Louis, killed about 1,100 people, left 50,000 homeless and halved the sugar crop. In 1902 surra killed the mules and horses that carried cane to the mills, and the estates turned to tramways and traction engines. A cyclone in 1931 destroyed 30 per cent of the crop. In 1960 two intense cyclones, Alix on 19 January and Carol on 28 February, made the year's cane and sugar yields proportionately the lowest in the industry's history. After Carol the government set up the Central Housing Authority in November 1960 to build low-cost, cyclone-proof houses.

Low sugar prices made the years from the 1880s to the 1940s a long period of hardship. By the early twentieth century unemployment and poverty were rising, with many applicants for poor relief. The Royal Commission of 1909 recommended loans to rehabilitate the railways and to improve cultivation and factory machinery. After the Second World War, house spraying with DDT from 1948 to 1952 cut malaria incidence from 105 to 2.6 cases per thousand people. Local transmission ended in 1969, and the island was certified malaria-free in 1973. The death rate fell from 29.5 per thousand in 1946 to 20.1 in 1947, the birth rate reached 49.7 per thousand in 1950, and population growth peaked at 3.12 per cent a year between 1952 and 1962. In 1960 the British government sent missions led by James Meade to study the economy and by Richard Titmuss to study the population problem. Meade stressed the limits set by the island's small size, remoteness and dependence on sugar, and diversification became the watchword of government and business in the 1960s.

=== National income and living standards ===
By the mid-twentieth century Mauritius was, in the words of the colony's report for 1963, "a text book example of a one crop economy". The report for 1953 stated that sugar "with its by-products accounts for over 99 per cent of the exports"; in 1963 sugar made up more than 95 per cent of domestic exports, and in 1967, with molasses, 96 per cent of exports by value. The island relied on sugar to buy "practically all it needs to live", including its staple food: in 1963 it imported 69,690 tonnes of rice, and its wheat flour came mainly from Australia and France. Incomes rose and fell with the crop: the cyclones of 1960 cut sugar production from 580,372 tonnes in 1959 to 235,578 tonnes, and gross national product per head fell from Rs 1,025 to Rs 879, before the record crop and high prices of 1963 raised it to Rs 1,262.

According to the Central Statistical Office, national income rose from Rs 298 million in 1948, or Rs 674.9 a head, to Rs 518 million in 1952, or Rs 1,016.1 a head. Gross national product at factor cost was Rs 614 million in 1958 and Rs 791 million in 1966; per head it was Rs 990 in 1958 and Rs 1,029 in 1966, almost unchanged in money terms while the population grew from 620,000 to 769,000. The report for 1967 observed that the gross national product "is largely a function of the proceeds of the sugar crop". Among later reconstructions, the Maddison Project Database, whose series for Mauritius begins in 1950, estimates GDP per capita at $3,942 in 1950, in 2011 international dollars, against $11,061 for the United Kingdom; it reached $5,745 in the bumper year of 1963 and was $4,602 in 1968, when the British figure was $16,593. The World Bank's series, which begins in 1960, gives GDP per capita of US$238 in 1960 and US$259 in 1968 at current prices. Frankel notes that in the 1960s Mauritius nevertheless had an income above the African average.

Selected economic indicators, 1950–1968
Year	Population (thousands, mid-year)	GDP per capita (2011 international dollars)	GDP per capita (current US dollars)	GNP per head at factor cost (rupees) (Note: Calculated by the colonial government on the population at 31 December of each year.)
1950	481	3,942	—	—
1955	572	4,095	—	—
1958	628	4,132	—	990
1960	663	4,396	238	879
1963	715	5,745	353	1,262
1966	774	4,921	296	1,029
1968	804	4,602	259	—

In 1937 labourers on monthly contracts received Rs 10 a month with rations, lodging and medical care, and male day labourers Rs 0.60 to Rs 1.25 a task (women Rs 0.35 to Rs 0.70), while managers of sugar estates and senior government officials earned Rs 8,000 to Rs 13,000 a year. Labourers' wages had been cut by 17.6 per cent between 1927 and 1931. In 1963 the average daily wage of labourers ranged from Rs 3.35 to Rs 5.35. As the population grew, so did unemployment: the colony's budget deficit for 1966–67 was due mainly to spending on relief works for the unemployed, and 19,614 people were on the Employment Service's live register in January 1967. Health improved, which the colonial government called "one of the most notable features in the recent history of the Colony": the death rate fell from 29.9 per thousand in 1938 to 8.5 in 1967, and infant mortality from 162.5 per thousand in 1938 to 76.3 in 1950 and a record low of 56.7 in 1964, before rising to 70.5 in 1967. On the recommendation of the Titmuss mission, a family allowance of Rs 15 a month for families with three children under 14 was introduced in January 1962.

Meade's mission, which visited the island in March and April 1960, was to recommend how it could be made "capable of maintaining and improving the standard of living of its people". Meade was pessimistic: he wrote in 1961 that "heavy population pressure must inevitably reduce real income per head", and that in a community full of political conflict "the outlook for peaceful development is poor". He doubted that industries producing for the small local market could succeed, and pointed instead to the possibility of "export platforms" using the island's abundant labour; following his report, the customs tariff was revised to protect local secondary industries. Frankel, who notes that Meade "forecast doom instead of success", nonetheless agrees "with Meade that the initial conditions were not auspicious". On the eve of independence, the Truth and Justice Commission concluded, the monocrop economy still dominated the life of Mauritius and unemployment and poverty that of its labouring classes; in its view, "an extreme international specialization within the British Empire had produced a vulnerable, fragile economy".

== Society and culture ==
=== Population ===
The Camp créole (top) and the Camp malabar (bottom), Port Louis, in engravings by Karl Girardet after sketches by Alfred Erny, who stayed on the island in 1860–1861. Erny described the town as a centre occupied by white families and two large suburbs: the Camp créole, the quarter of Black and some mixed-race inhabitants, and the Camp malabar, a small-scale copy of an Indian town inhabited by workers and traders

The historian Anthony Toth describes colonial society as a small body of British administrators and judges set over a powerful Franco-Mauritian elite. That elite drew its wealth mainly from the plantations but also supplied senior police officers and magistrates. Next in status came the Creoles, descendants of African slaves, some of partly European ancestry, who were largely francophone and tended to side with the Franco-Mauritians. Indians ranked lowest in the nineteenth century, rising as their economic opportunities grew. Freed slaves and their descendants left the plantations to become fishermen, dockworkers and civil servants.

The census counted the "general population" (white, black and mixed), Indians born in India, Indo-Mauritians born in the colony, and Chinese. From 1861 the remaining former apprentices were counted in the General Population. The 1911 census recorded 368,791 people: 107,432 in the General Population, 257,697 Indians and 3,662 Chinese. In 1914 Albert Pitot estimated the white population, mostly of French origin with a few British families, at about 10,000. He set it beside a small educated gentry of colour, a coloured middle class and working class, and the descendants of freed slaves. These last were nearly half the General Population, and most of them could not read or write.

The 1962 census counted 681,619 people. The colonial report of 1963 described Indo-Mauritians, Hindu and Muslim, as two-thirds of the population. The General Population of French, British and mixed descent, mainly Roman Catholic, made up about a quarter, and the Sino-Mauritians were half Christian and half Buddhist. Occupations, the report noted, still tended to follow community lines.

=== Language ===
English became the official language, but French and Creole remained dominant, and few British settlers came. Under Governor Gomm knowledge of English became necessary for public employment, and the courts used English. In the late 1850s, after thirteen years of English in the courts, Mauritians petitioned Queen Victoria for equal recognition of French and English; the petition was refused. In a study of Mauritian place names Nuckiren Pyeneeandee found that, despite 158 years of British presence, most are French, because French remained the island's main language.

Indian immigrants from the north of India spoke Bhojpuri, and many of higher status also wrote Urdu. The language of schooling was disputed. In the 1870s Governor Arthur Phayre opened experimental schools teaching in Hindi, Tamil and Marathi. A committee under his successor recommended closing them because English would be more useful, and officials argued that Indian children born in Mauritius already spoke Creole. By 1963 newspapers appeared in French, English, Hindi, Urdu, Tamil and Chinese. The broadcasting service used English, French and Hindustani, with programmes in six other Indian languages and two Chinese dialects.

=== Religion ===
The Roman Catholic cathedral (top) and the Central Railway Station (bottom), Port Louis, photographed between 1880 and 1899

The capitulation of 1810 guaranteed the inhabitants their religion. The colonial government continued to pay the Roman Catholic clergy under an arrangement made by the French revolutionary government to compensate for confiscated church property. Vicars apostolic from the English Benedictines led the Catholic Church until Collier was appointed the first Bishop of Port Louis in December 1846. Army chaplains held the first Anglican services. St James's Church in Port Louis was consecrated in 1850, and Ryan, the first Church of England Bishop of Mauritius, was appointed in 1854. The missionary Jacques-Désiré Laval, who arrived in 1841, catechised large numbers of the poor. He died on 9 September 1864, and his grave at Sainte-Croix became a place of pilgrimage for people of all classes and faiths. In 1911 there were 122,586 Christians, 115,984 of them Roman Catholics. Among the Indian population the census of that year counted 202,750 Hindus, 39,120 Muslims and 14,100 Christians.

Indian Muslims had obtained a site for a mosque in Port Louis from Governor Decaen in 1805. On the sugar estates, camps had baitkas, temples, chapels and madrasas. Harvest offerings to the goddess Kalimai were led by sirdars, often with the support of estate managers. An account republished by the Mauritius Times dates the Hindu pilgrimage to the lake of Grand Bassin, now Ganga Talao, for Maha Shivaratri to 1898. That year four immigrant pandits went in search of a lake whose water could be offered to Shiva.

=== Education ===
The Royal College, photographed between 1892 and 1929. Secondary and higher education was given at the Royal College and associated schools in Port Louis and Curepipe

The legal abolition of the colour bar in 1829 let the first Creole pupils enter the Royal College, despite protests from whites. By 1914 two English scholarships worth £1,150 each were awarded every year on examinations set by Cambridge University. W. Eyre, a professor at the college, called the scholarship "the educational grand prix of Mauritius". The college moved to Curepipe in 1899, when its Port Louis building was taken over as a plague hospital, and in 1912 the government decided to keep it there permanently.

Primary education was provided by government schools and grant-aided schools, mostly run by Christian missions. It charged fees until the 1880s. In 1913 it was free but not compulsory, and grants were paid by results. The Royal Commission of 1872 found that, of nearly 40,000 Indian children aged five to fourteen, not more than a thousand attended school. Parents feared that mission schools would convert their children. They also disliked teaching in foreign languages and depended on their children's earnings. In 1911, 41.9 per cent of the General Population but only 1.7 per cent of Indians were recorded as able to read and write. The Education Act of 1941 centralised the administration of all schools and introduced a common Standard VI examination. Primary schooling then expanded to nearly all children, and the University of Mauritius was founded in 1965.

=== Press, science and the arts ===
Races on the Champ de Mars, Port Louis, an illustration in Nicolas Pike's Sub-Tropical Rambles in the Land of the Aphanapteryx (1873)

Once the press had been freed, Adrien d'Épinay founded Le Cernéen on 14 February 1832. It later became the organ of the white population of French origin, and by 1914 it was the oldest newspaper on the island. Eugène Henry founded the daily Le Mauricien in 1908. Thirteen daily newspapers were published in 1963.

Charles Telfair and Julien Desjardins founded the Society of Arts and Sciences of Mauritius in 1829, and Queen Victoria granted it the royal title in 1847. An ordinance of 1880 set up the Mauritius Institute, a museum and library in Port Louis, and Desjardins's collection moved there from the Royal College in 1885. In September 1865 workers digging the marsh at Mare aux Songes for fertiliser found a mass of bones. George Clark, a government schoolmaster at Grand Port, recovered from it the bones of the dodo, and Richard Owen assembled a skeleton from them in London. The Royal Botanic Gardens at Pamplemousses, founded by Pierre Poivre in 1769, continued under British rule. In 1868, at the urging of the Chamber of Agriculture, the government sent the Director of Forests and Gardens, J. C. Meller, abroad to collect new cane varieties for a nursery there.

Horse racing began at the Champ de Mars on 25 June 1812. The Mauritius Turf Club states that its founders hoped racing would reconcile the French settlers with the British administration. In September 1847, under a postal ordinance of 1846, the colony issued its first postage stamps, the one-penny and two-pence "Post Office" stamps. They were engraved by Joseph Barnard, a local watchmaker, and only 500 of each were printed.

== Politics and the road to independence (1900–1968) ==
The constitution of 1885 remained in force, with minor amendments, until 1947, and its property franchise kept the great majority of the population out of politics.

=== Retrocession movement and early politics ===
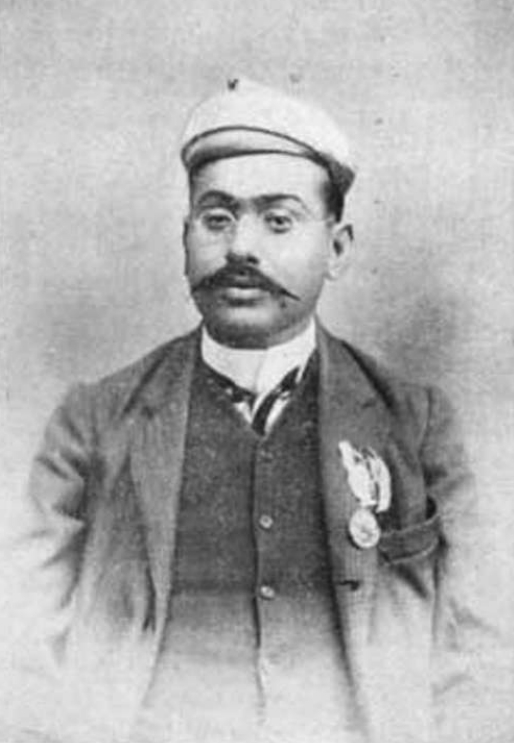
Manilal Doctor, a lawyer sent to Mauritius in 1907 at the behest of Mahatma Gandhi, who defended Indian labourers in the courts and founded the newspaper The Hindustani

After a sugar depression, a royal commission headed by Sir Frank Swettenham was appointed in 1909 to examine the colony's finances and administration, and reported in 1910. It recommended an end to the recruitment of labour from India and noted that the Indian majority had no representation in the legislature, though the Truth and Justice Commission later criticised it for helping the planters while proposing nothing for labourers.

Indian political life owed much to Manilal Doctor, a lawyer sent to Mauritius in 1907 at the request of Mohandas Gandhi, who defended Indian labourers in the courts and founded the newspaper Hindustani. The Creole middle class organised at the same time: in 1907 it formed the Action Libérale under Dr Eugène Laurent, mayor of Port Louis and the acknowledged spokesman of the coloured population. Laurent won a seat in Port Louis at the 1911 general election against William Newton, the oligarchy's candidate, but the party's attempt to widen the franchise failed, and the declaration of the results was followed by riots in Port Louis directed against Franco-Mauritians, which British troops helped to contain. The party dissolved soon afterwards.

From 1912 the journalist Edouard Laurent, a man of colour who had founded the newspaper La Patrie, called for the "retrocession" of Mauritius to France, arguing that the island remained French in language and manners and that France treated people of colour better than Britain did. The movement grew after the First World War, encouraged by President Woodrow Wilson's principle of self-determination. Its supporters, Franco-Mauritians as well as men of colour such as the young doctor Maurice Curé, held a banquet in honour of France on 4 February 1919, sent delegates to Paris and set out to make retrocession the main issue at the next general election. Most of the sugar oligarchy, fearing universal suffrage and lower sugar prices under France, opposed it, as did most Indo-Mauritians. From 1920 the governor, Sir Hesketh Bell, treated public advocacy of retrocession as disloyal, and a warship, HMS Comus, was sent to Port Louis for the election of January 1921, which became a virtual referendum on the question. Opponents of retrocession won nearly 72 per cent of the vote. The historian Jocelyn Chan Low considers that the election was far from free, but that the weight of the oligarchy in the electoral system had doomed the cause in advance. Historians have variously read the movement as a lack of patriotism, an expression of class conflict, or a reaction against the growing weight of the Indian population.

In 1926 the first Indo-Mauritians were elected to the Council of Government: Rajcoomar Gujadhur for Flacq and Dunputh Lallah for Savanne.

=== Labour unrest: Uba (1937), the 1938 strike and Belle Vue Harel (1943) ===
During the Depression agricultural wages fell by 17.6 per cent between 1927 and 1931. On 23 February 1936, after his defeat at the general election in January, Curé presided over a meeting of four to five thousand people, mostly workers, on the Champ de Mars in Port Louis. It called for labour representation in the legislature, the vote for wage-earners, legal trade unions, old-age pensions, a Labour Department and the formation of a Labour Party. The new Mauritius Labour Party, led by Curé with Emmanuel Anquetil and Pandit Sahadeo, held meetings across the island and drew support from urban Creole workers and rural Indian farmers.

At the start of the cane harvest in late July 1937, labourers and small planters struck after estates including Sans Souci and Rich Fund cut by 15 per cent the price paid for cane of the Uba variety, which had a lower sugar content than other canes. On 13 August the management of the Union Flacq estate, owned by the Indo-Mauritian Gujadhur family, opened fire on a crowd, killing four labourers and small planters; the official report said that the mill staff had feared being rushed by a hostile mob, and recorded six wounded, and one further death when a party of police, attacked with stones, opened fire. The unrest spread to Grand Port and Savanne, where the police station at Souillac was attacked, and ended on 8 September after the millers agreed to reduce the cut and to raise wages.

A commission of enquiry appointed in mid-August under the procureur général, known as the Hooper Commission, reported in March 1938; its report, often described as a landmark, recommended the legalisation of labour associations, a Labour Department under a British official and a 10 per cent rise in wages. In 1938 a Director of Labour was seconded from Malaya, and the Industrial Associations Ordinance allowed workers and employers to form associations and set up conciliation boards, but made a strike illegal unless a board had failed to settle the dispute within thirty days; a new Labour Ordinance introduced an eight-hour day, overtime rules and maternity benefits. Chan Low describes the ordinance's provisions as "highly restrictive".

In September 1938 dock workers in Port Louis struck for higher wages, and the governor, Sir Bede Clifford, declared a state of emergency, arguing that a stoppage at the docks threatened the whole sugar industry. About three hundred strikers were arrested, Curé was confined more or less to house arrest, and Anquetil and his sixteen-year-old son were deported to Rodrigues, while labourers brought from sugar estates loaded the ships under military protection. The strike ended after a few days, and a conciliation board later improved the dockers' pay and conditions. In the House of Lords in 1944, Lord Faringdon said that the episode suggested that "the forces of the State were too readily at the beck and call of the employers".

As wartime prices outran wages, strikes broke out on several estates in the north in 1943, and in September police fired on strikers at Belle Vue Harel. The official review of the war years and Lord Faringdon gave the toll as three dead, while a question in the House of Commons referred to "the shooting of four workers", and the Truth and Justice Commission names Anjalay Coopen and three other workers among the dead. The commission of inquiry chaired by the colonial secretary, the Moody Commission, found that the industry's failure to pay the legal minimum wage was a chief cause of the strike. It recommended a 10 per cent rise in wages and an industrial arbitration tribunal, and its finding that no government officers apart from the police lived among the rural population led to the creation of district civil commissioners. Chan Low argues that the colonial authorities changed their approach only after the shooting, while the Truth and Justice Commission concluded that the colonial state had combined repression, deporting union leaders and imprisoning strikers, with the building of a system of industrial relations.

=== The world wars ===
Before the First World War the island was defended by about 1,000 British and Indian troops; in 1916 a little over 500 recruits joined a local Volunteer Force of infantry, artillery, engineers and an ambulance corps, which allowed most of the regular garrison to be sent elsewhere, and a naval wireless station was built at Rose-Belle in 1915. In 1917 a labour battalion was raised, and more than 1,500 Mauritians served with it in Mesopotamia. Another 520 Mauritians joined the British and French armies and close to 200 the merchant navy. High sugar prices during and after the war brought a boom that ended in 1921.

In the Second World War the island was at first remote from the fighting and protected by the Royal Navy. Mauritians bought a squadron of Spitfires by public subscription, and a motor transport unit and a pioneer unit were raised for service in the field; the pioneers suffered serious casualties in the Libyan desert. After the fall of Singapore in February 1942 the Japanese were, in the words of the new governor, Sir Donald Mackenzie-Kennedy, "just over the horizon", and an attack was for a time regarded as inevitable. Forces were raised for service on the island and overseas, and conscription and rationing were introduced. Because rice, the staple food, came from India and Burma, the sugar estates were asked to plant a fifth of their land with food crops, and by 1943 rice supplies had stopped altogether. Later in the war the garrison was reinforced with African troops, Grand Port became an auxiliary naval base and a permanent aerodrome was built near Mahébourg. The war also delayed political reform: the Council of Government elected in 1936 had its life extended and sat until 1948.

=== 1947 constitution and the 1948 election ===
In 1945 a consultative committee, which for the first time brought together representatives of all communities, discussed a new constitution, but it deadlocked over universal male suffrage, votes for women and plural voting. The governor, Mackenzie-Kennedy, who believed that most of the people were not yet ready for democratic institutions, broke the deadlock with his own proposals, and the new constitution was issued by letters patent, royal instructions and an order in council of 9 December 1947. (Note: The annual report for 1947 dates the letters patent 19 December 1947; the report for 1949 gives 9 December 1947 for the letters patent, royal instructions and order in council.) It replaced the Council of Government with a Legislative Council of 34 members, comprising the governor as president, 19 elected members, 12 nominated members and 3 officials, and a separate Executive Council. The property qualification was abolished, and the vote was given to men and women aged 21 or over who could read and write simple sentences and sign their names in one of eight languages (English, French, Gujarati, Hindustani, Tamil, Urdu, Chinese or Creole). The electorate grew about sixfold, from 11,884 at the end of 1946 to 71,806 registered by April 1948.

At the general election of 9–10 August 1948, the first for thirteen years, 90.6 per cent of registered voters went to the polls. Indo-Mauritian candidates won all nine rural seats and two in Port Louis and Plaines Wilhems, so that eleven of the nineteen elected members were Hindus. The Labour Party, now led by Guy Rozemont and helped by the Jan Andolan movement of the Bissoondoyal brothers, grouped 13 of the elected members according to the colonial report, or 12 according to the arbitral tribunal in the Chagos case. Seewoosagur Ramgoolam, elected as an independent with Labour support, was among the Labour members chosen for the Executive Council. The governor's twelve nominations, in the official report's view, partly redressed the balance; the Library of Congress country study says that they assured the dominance of British and Franco-Mauritian interests. At the election of August 1953 Labour candidates won 13 of the 19 elected seats (14 according to the arbitral tribunal), and in December the Legislative Council backed Rozemont's call for talks on universal suffrage and a ministerial system.

=== Universal suffrage and ministerial government (1958–1964) ===
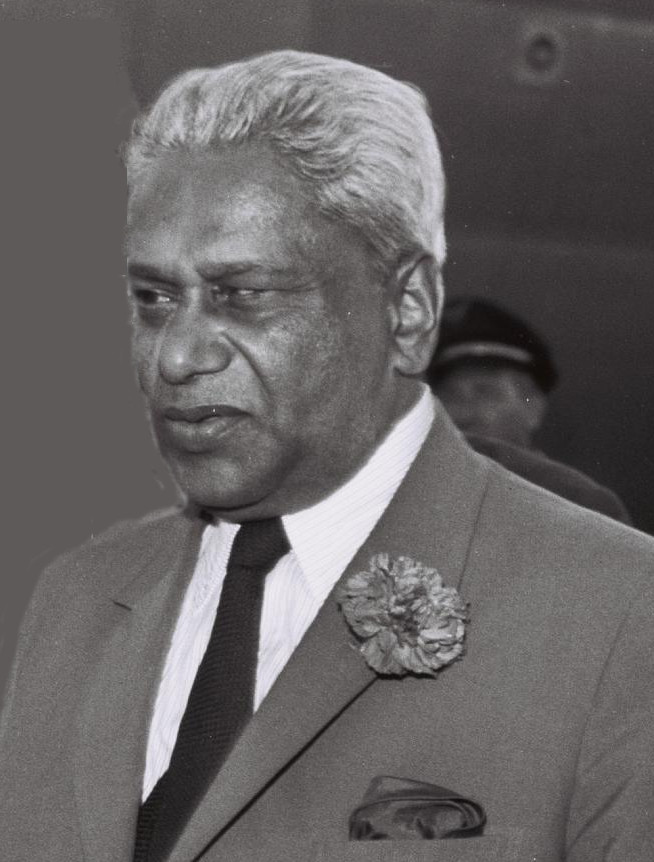
Seewoosagur Ramgoolam, who became Chief Minister in 1962 and, under the 1964 constitution, Premier

Talks in London in 1955 stalled over safeguards for minorities under universal suffrage, and Labour rejected British proposals of 1956 for proportional representation. Under the "London Agreement" of March 1957 a boundary commission recommended forty single-member constituencies, and the governor kept the power to nominate up to twelve members to represent minorities, without frustrating the result of the elections. The constitution that came into force on 31 December 1958 gave the vote to all adults over 21. At the first election under universal suffrage, on 9 March 1959, Labour won 23 of the 40 seats, its ally the Muslim Committee of Action 5, the Independent Forward Bloc 6 and the Parti Mauricien 8. By then the Labour-led government had openly adopted the goal of independence.

A constitutional review conference in London in 1961 laid down a programme of advance in two stages; under the first, from 1 January 1962, the leader of the majority party became Chief Minister, and Ramgoolam was appointed to the post. At the election of October 1963 the Parti Mauricien under Gaëtan Duval mounted a strong challenge, but Labour remained the largest party with 19 of the 40 seats. Ramgoolam formed a government with the Muslim Committee of Action and the Independent Forward Bloc, which the Parti Mauricien joined in March 1964. Under the constitution of 12 March 1964 the Chief Minister became Premier, the legislature became a Legislative Assembly of 40 elected and up to 15 nominated members, and a chapter on fundamental rights was included for the first time. The governor still presided over the Council of Ministers, and external affairs, defence and internal security remained with the official Chief Secretary. Communal tension grew, and riots in May 1965 left several people dead.

=== Constitutional conferences and the Chagos (1961–1965) ===
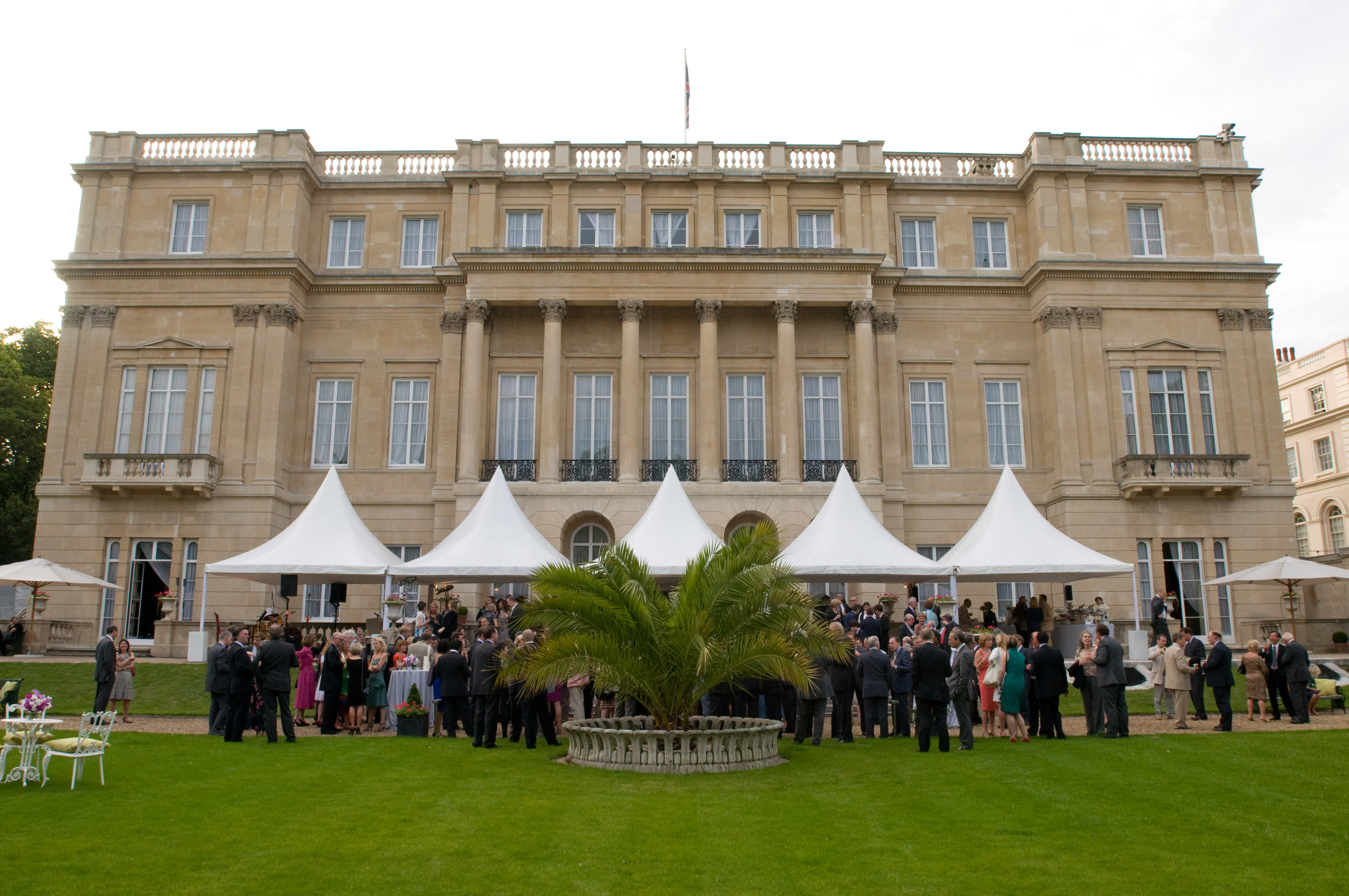
Lancaster House, London, where on 23 September 1965, during the conference on Mauritian independence, the Premier, Seewoosagur Ramgoolam, and two other ministers agreed in principle to the detachment of the Chagos Archipelago

The final constitutional conference met at Lancaster House in London from 7 to 24 September 1965 under the Colonial Secretary, Anthony Greenwood, to settle the colony's future status. Labour, the Independent Forward Bloc and the Muslim Committee of Action supported independence, while the Parti Mauricien Social Démocrate (PMSD), led by Jules Koenig and backed by most Franco-Mauritians and many Creoles, advocated "free association with Britain" and demanded a referendum. With no agreement between the parties, Greenwood decided that Mauritius should become independent after a general election under a new electoral system and six months of internal self-government, if the new Legislative Assembly asked for it by a simple majority; he rejected a referendum, and the PMSD stayed away from the final session.

The conference was overshadowed by the planned detachment of the Chagos Archipelago, where the United States wanted a military communications facility on Diego Garcia. On the morning of 23 September the Prime Minister, Harold Wilson, told Ramgoolam that he and his colleagues could return to Mauritius "either with Independence or without it", and that Diego Garcia could be detached by Order in Council or by agreement. That afternoon at Lancaster House, Ramgoolam told Greenwood that the British proposals were acceptable in principle; the undertakings offered included compensation of up to £3 million and the return of the islands to Mauritius if the need for the defence facilities disappeared. The Council of Ministers confirmed the agreement on 5 November 1965, with the PMSD ministers dissenting, and on 8 November an Order in Council made the archipelago part of the new British Indian Ocean Territory. The PMSD then left the government, saying that better compensation should have been obtained. How freely Mauritian consent was given is disputed. The United Kingdom has argued that independence was announced before the Council of Ministers agreed and would have gone ahead had it refused, while in 2019 the International Court of Justice concluded that the detachment "was not based on the free and genuine expression of the will of the people concerned".

=== The 1967 election and independence ===
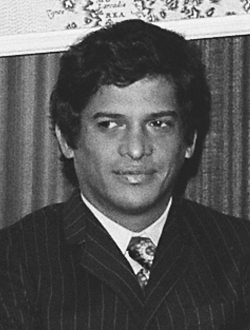
The Mauritius Independence Act 1968 (left), which provided that from 12 March 1968 the British government would have no responsibility for the government of Mauritius; Gaëtan Duval (right), leader of the Parti Mauricien Social Démocrate, which advocated continued association with Britain before the general election of 7 August 1967

An electoral commission under Sir Harold Banwell held hearings in Mauritius in January 1966 and proposed twenty three-member constituencies, a two-member seat for Rodrigues and two sets of "corrective" seats. After the Legislative Assembly rejected the correctives in June 1966, the Parliamentary Under-Secretary, John Stonehouse, negotiated an agreement, announced on 4 July, which replaced them with eight seats for the most successful unelected candidates, the first four allocated to under-represented communities and the rest on the basis of party and community: the best-loser system.

The general election of 7 August 1967 was fought mainly on the question of independence, which the Independence Party, an alliance of Labour, the Independent Forward Bloc and the Muslim Committee of Action, supported, and which the PMSD opposed in favour of association with Britain. Commonwealth observers reported that "the election was conducted from start to finish in a fair and free way, and that the results reflect the true wishes of the Mauritian people". The Independence Party won 39 of the 62 constituency seats and the PMSD 23, including both seats in Rodrigues; after the allocation of the best-loser seats the result was 43 seats to 27. According to the political scientist Jean Houbert, the pro-independence alliance won 54 per cent of the vote. Duval accepted the result as the electorate's verdict. Internal self-government began on 12 August, and on 22 August the new Legislative Assembly asked the British government to fix a date for independence; in October the date was set as 12 March 1968, and Ramgoolam took the title of Prime Minister. The British Parliament then passed the Mauritius Independence Act 1968.

In January 1968 fighting between communal gangs, mainly Creoles and Muslims, spread from the east of Port Louis; the governor declared a state of emergency and extended it to the whole island on 22 January, and with Ramgoolam's agreement a contingent of the King's Shropshire Light Infantry was sent from Singapore. By 30 January 24 people had been killed, 43 seriously injured and 344 arrested. Because the emergency was still in force, Princess Alexandra's visit for the independence celebrations was cancelled.

Mauritius became independent on 12 March 1968 as a constitutional monarchy, with Elizabeth II as queen. The last governor, Sir John Rennie, became Governor-General and opened the new Parliament on the queen's behalf, and Ramgoolam became the first Prime Minister. The independence constitution defined Mauritius as the territories that had made up the colony immediately before independence, a definition that excluded the Chagos Archipelago. A defence agreement was signed on independence day, as promised at the 1965 conference, which had envisaged continued British use of the naval communications station, HMS Mauritius, and of Plaisance airfield. Mauritius became a republic within the Commonwealth on 12 March 1992.

== Legacy ==
Le Morne Brabant, whose cultural landscape was inscribed on the World Heritage List in 2008; UNESCO calls the mountain "a symbol of the slaves' fight for freedom". The Aapravasi Ghat was inscribed in 2006

Mauritius kept the parliamentary institutions it inherited from Britain: in the view of the Judicial Committee of the Privy Council, its independence constitution followed the familiar Westminster model. English is the official language of the National Assembly, although members may address the chair in French, and the Judicial Committee of the Privy Council remains the final court of appeal. The legal system is hybrid, combining private law based on the Napoleonic Code with areas such as company law, evidence and procedure influenced by the common law since 1810. The best-loser system devised in 1966 survives in the constitution, which provides eight additional seats for unsuccessful candidates "to ensure a fair and adequate representation of each community".

The Truth and Justice Commission concluded that the plantation economy had given rise to "a very rigid hierarchical, racialised and class-ridden society" which would dominate independent Mauritius. Two sites of the colonial labour system are World Heritage Sites: the Aapravasi Ghat in Port Louis, inscribed in 2006, the immigration depot associated with almost half a million indentured labourers from India and with the British government's "great experiment" in replacing slave with indentured labour; and Le Morne, inscribed in 2008, a mountain that sheltered escaped slaves and has become a symbol of resistance to slavery.

The Truth and Justice Commission, set up under an act of 2008 to assess the consequences of slavery and indentured labour from the colonial period to the present, reported in November 2011. It recommended that the government seek funding for reparations from the United Kingdom and France, as the historical slave-trading nations, for communities in which the descendants of slaves are the majority; that poor families receive "social reparations" such as housing and education; and that a policy of affirmative action address the imbalances created under slavery, indenture and colonialism. It also proposed a fairer distribution of land as a form of reparation for dispossession.

The detachment of the Chagos Archipelago remained in dispute after independence. In 2019 the International Court of Justice found, by 13 votes to 1, that the decolonisation of Mauritius had not been lawfully completed when it became independent in 1968. On 22 May 2025 the two governments signed an agreement under which the United Kingdom accepts that Mauritius is sovereign over the archipelago.

== Governors ==
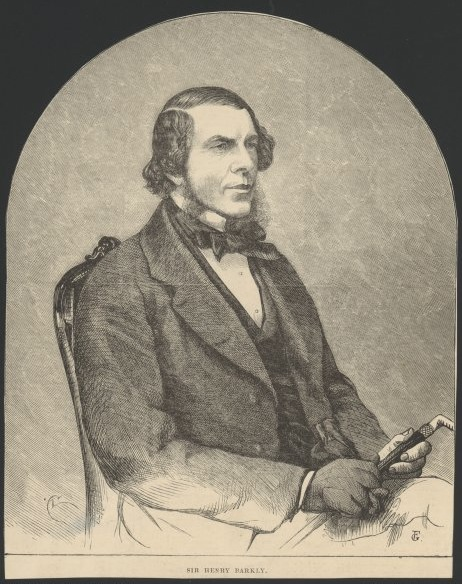
Sir Henry Barkly, governor from 1863 to 1871

The table lists the substantive governors given in the Colonial Office List, with the date on which each assumed the government where the List or Pridham records it, and otherwise the year given in the List for 1966. (Note: For 1828–1842 the Colonial Office List for 1890 prints dates whose years conflict with its own later lists and with Pridham's narrative; the table gives only the years for those governors. Acting governors, who administered the colony during vacancies and the governors' absences, are mentioned only where noted.) On the eve of independence the last governor, Sir John Rennie, was appointed GCMG as "Governor-General (designate) of Mauritius".

Governors of Mauritius, 1810–1968
Took office	Governor	Notes
3 December 1810	Robert Townsend Farquhar	Major-General Henry Warde acted in 1811; Major-General Gage John Hall administered the colony from 19 November 1817, followed by acting governors until Farquhar's return on 6 July 1820.
12 June 1823	Sir Galbraith Lowry Cole	
June 1828	Sir Charles Colville	
31 January 1833	Sir William Nicolay	
1840	Sir Lionel Smith	Died in office, January 1842.
1842	Sir William Maynard Gomm	Lieutenant-Colonel William Staveley acted after Smith's death.
8 June 1849	Sir George William Anderson	
8 January 1851	Sir James Macaulay Higginson	
21 September 1857	Sir William Stevenson	
22 August 1863	Sir Henry Barkly	
21 February 1871	Sir Arthur Hamilton-Gordon	
21 November 1874	Sir Arthur Purves Phayre	
4 April 1879	Sir George Ferguson Bowen	
9 December 1880	Frederick Napier Broome	Lieutenant-governor.
1 June 1883	Sir John Pope Hennessy	Sir Hercules Robinson, on a special mission to Mauritius in 1886, assumed the government for a few days.
1 December 1889	Sir Charles Cameron Lees	
21 June 1893	Sir Hubert Jerningham	Acting governor from 12 March 1892.
11 May 1897	Sir Charles Bruce	
20 August 1904	Sir Cavendish Boyle	
13 November 1911	Sir John Chancellor	
18 May 1916	Sir Hesketh Bell	
19 February 1925	Sir Herbert Read	
30 August 1930	Sir Wilfrid Jackson	
23 October 1937	Sir Bede Clifford	Appointment announced in August 1937.
1942	Sir Donald Mackenzie-Kennedy	Appointment announced in July 1942.
1949	Sir Hilary Blood	Appointment announced in May 1949.
1953 or 1954	Sir Robert Scott	The Colonial Office List gives 1953; the appointment was announced in January 1954.
1959	Sir Colville Deverell	Appointment announced in October 1959.
1962	Sir John Shaw Rennie	Appointment announced in September 1962; Governor-General designate at independence. The London Gazette of 2 August 1968 named Leonard Williams as the next Governor-General designate.

== Gallery ==
Port Louis from the Champ de Mars, one of the Eight Views of the Mauritius (1813)

Port Louis seen from the sea, an engraving by Karl Girardet after Alfred Erny, published in 1863

The theatre of Port Louis, from Nicolas Pike's Sub-Tropical Rambles (1873)

The port of Souillac, an engraving by Karl Girardet after Alfred Erny, published in 1863

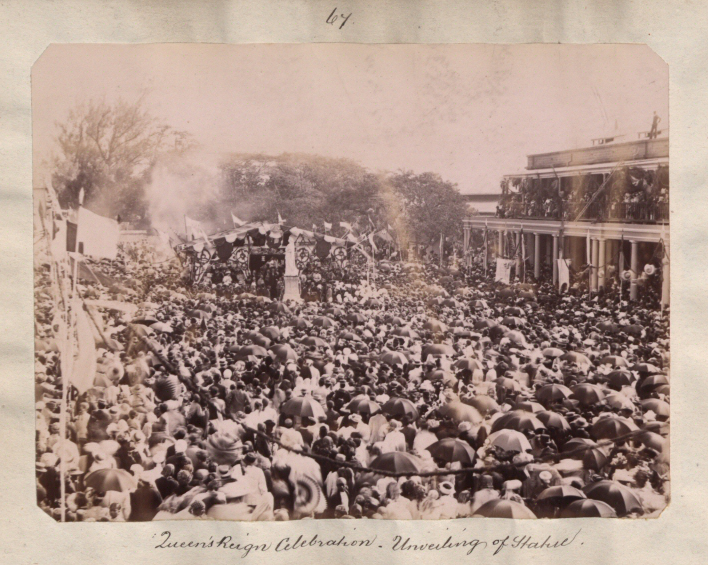
Celebration of the Queen's reign: the unveiling of a statue, between 1880 and 1899

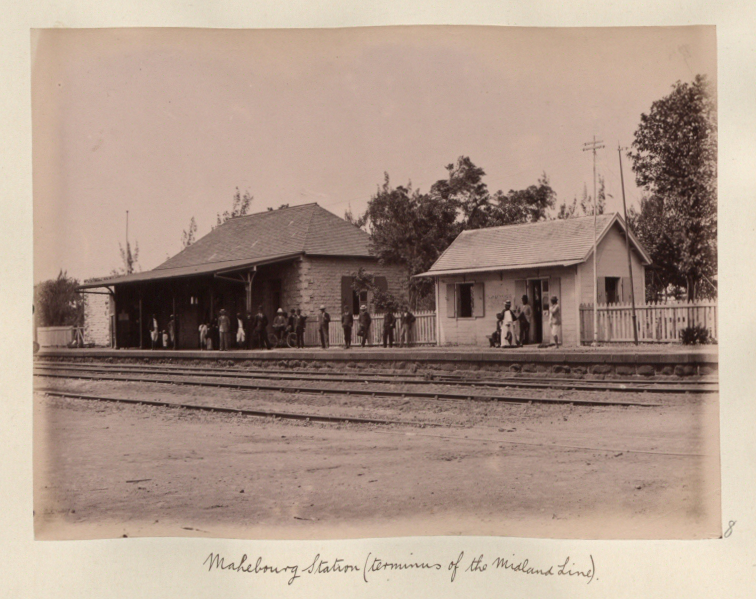
Mahébourg station, terminus of the Midland line, between 1892 and 1929

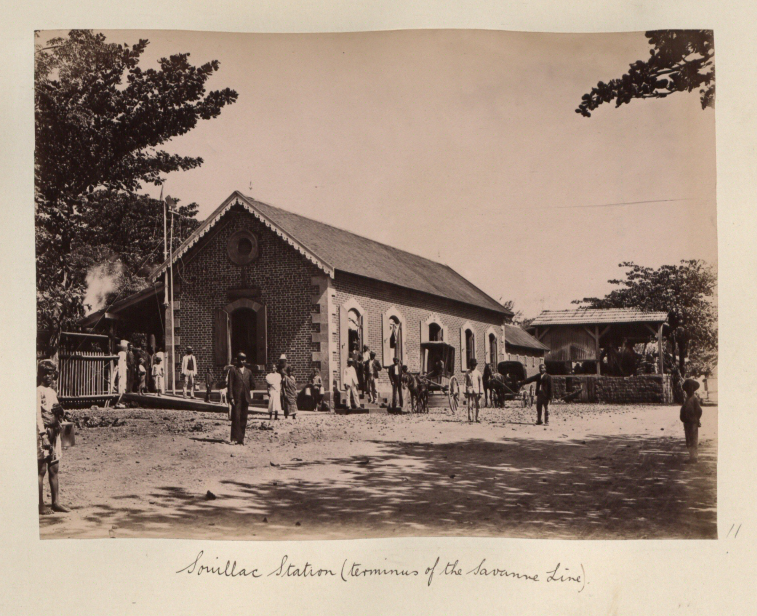
Souillac station, terminus of the Savanne line, between 1892 and 1929

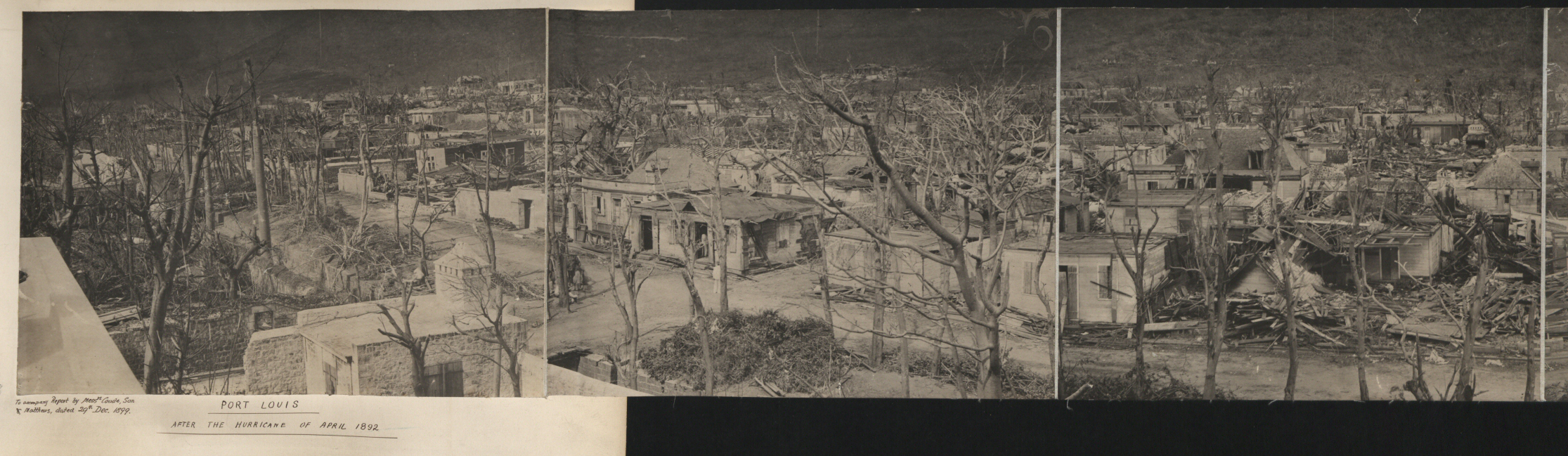
Port Louis after the hurricane of April 1892

A sugar factory in Port Louis, 1955

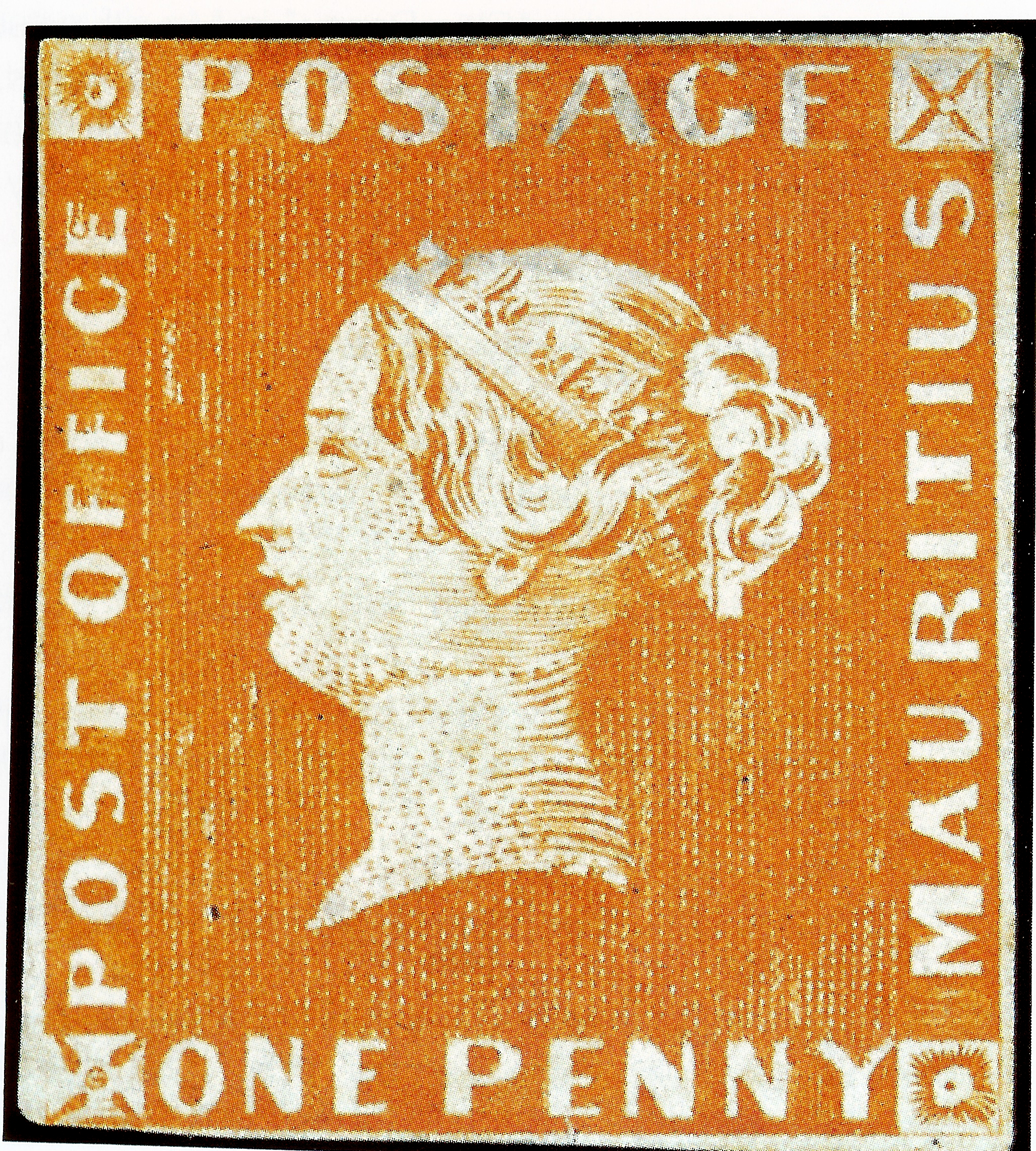
A one-penny "Post Office" stamp

The bay of Grand Port, near Mahébourg, an engraving by Karl Girardet after Alfred Erny, published in 1863

Port Louis, from Nicolas Pike's Sub-Tropical Rambles (1873)

== See also ==
- Governor of British Mauritius
- History of Mauritius
- Independence of Mauritius
- Mauritius–United Kingdom relations
- Detachment of the Chagos Archipelago
- Indian indenture system

== Sources ==
=== Official publications and parliamentary papers ===
- Hydrographic Office (1884). Indian Ocean: Sailing Directions for Mauritius and the Islands Included in Its Government; with an Appendix, Réunion Island. Compiled by W. R. Martin and W. H. Petley. London: Admiralty.
- Gaymard, Hervé (20 March 2013). Rapport fait au nom de la commission des affaires étrangères sur le projet de loi, adopté par le Sénat, autorisant l'approbation de l'accord-cadre entre le Gouvernement de la République française et le Gouvernement de la République de Maurice sur la cogestion économique, scientifique et environnementale relative à l'île de Tromelin et à ses espaces maritimes environnants (PDF) (Report) (in French). Assemblée nationale. No. 830.
- "Tour Highlights". Bank of Mauritius Museum. Bank of Mauritius.
- Basant Roi, Rameswurlall (3 November 2017). Inaugural Ceremony for the Opening of the Bank of Mauritius Museum (Speech). Opening of the Bank of Mauritius Museum. Port Louis.
- Government of Mauritius (1908). Blue Book for the Colony of Mauritius, 1907. Port Louis: Storekeeper General's Printing Establishment.
- Fairfield, Edward; Anderson, John, eds. (1886). The Colonial Office List for 1886. London: Harrison and Sons.
- Anderson, John; Webb, Sidney, eds. (1888). The Colonial Office List for 1888. London: Harrison and Sons.
- Anderson, John; Webb, Sidney, eds. (1890). The Colonial Office List for 1890. London: Harrison and Sons.
- Mercer, W. H.; Collins, A. E.; Robinson, J. R. W., eds. (1913). The Colonial Office List for 1913. London: Waterlow & Sons.
- Harding, John; Gent, G. E. J., eds. (1939). The Dominions Office and Colonial Office List for 1939. London: Waterlow & Sons.
- Colonial Office (1953). The Colonial Office List 1953. London: Her Majesty's Stationery Office.
- Colonial Office (1966). The Colonial Office List 1966. London: Her Majesty's Stationery Office.
- Colonial Office (1938). Annual Report on the Social and Economic Progress of the People of Mauritius, 1937. Colonial Reports – Annual. London: His Majesty's Stationery Office. No. 1874.
- Colonial Office (1939). Annual Report on the Social and Economic Progress of the People of Mauritius, 1938. Colonial Reports – Annual. London: His Majesty's Stationery Office. No. 1905.
- Colonial Office (1948). Annual Report on Mauritius for the Year 1946. Colonial Reports. London: His Majesty's Stationery Office.
- Colonial Office (1949). Annual Report on Mauritius for the Year 1947. Colonial Reports. London: His Majesty's Stationery Office.
- Colonial Office (1949). Annual Report on Mauritius for the Year 1948. Colonial Reports. London: His Majesty's Stationery Office.
- Colonial Office (1950). Report on Mauritius for the Year 1949. Colonial Reports. London: His Majesty's Stationery Office.
- Mauritius 1952. Colonial Reports. London: Her Majesty's Stationery Office. 1954.
- Colonial Office (1954). Report on Mauritius for the Year 1953. Colonial Reports. London: Her Majesty's Stationery Office.
- Colonial Office (1959). Report on Mauritius for the Year 1957. Colonial Reports. London: Her Majesty's Stationery Office.
- Colonial Office (1961). Report on Mauritius, 1960. Colonial Reports. London: Her Majesty's Stationery Office.
- Colonial Office (1963). Mauritius: Report for the Year 1962. Colonial Reports. London: Her Majesty's Stationery Office.
- Mauritius: Report for the Year 1963. Colonial Reports. London: Her Majesty's Stationery Office. 1965.
- Mauritius: Report for the Year 1964. Colonial Reports. London: Her Majesty's Stationery Office. 1966.
- Foreign and Commonwealth Office (1970). Mauritius: Report for the Year 1967. London: Her Majesty's Stationery Office.
- The Constitution of the Republic of Mauritius (PDF). Mauritius National Assembly. May 2018.
- Mauritius Constitutional Conference Report 1965 (PDF). Colonial Office. 24 September 1965. Cmnd. 2797 – via Written Statement of the Republic of Mauritius (ICJ), Vol. III, Annex 64.
- "Mauritius Grants Concession for Production of Guano on Tromelin Island". Foreign Commerce Weekly. Vol. 34, no. 12. United States Department of Commerce. 21 March 1949. p. 29.
- "Constitutional Evolution of Mauritius: From British Rule to Independence" (PDF). Government of Mauritius. Archived from the original (PDF) on 8 December 2015.
- "Slave Trading, and the State of the Slaves at the Mauritius". Hansard, House of Commons. 9 May 1826.
- "Emigration to the Mauritius. Question". Hansard, House of Commons. 12 February 1872.
- "Mauritius (Commission's Report)". Hansard, House of Commons. 3 November 1937.
- "Mauritius (Shooting Inquiry)". Hansard, House of Commons. 27 October 1943.
- "Mauritius (State of Emergency)". Hansard, House of Commons. 23 January 1968.
- "Mauritius". Hansard, House of Commons. 30 January 1968.
- "Mauritius". Hansard, House of Commons. 8 March 1968.
- "Coolie Trade in the Mauritius—The Royal Commission. Question. Observations". Hansard, House of Lords. 12 May 1876.
- "Mauritius". Hansard, House of Lords. 19 April 1944.
- "Mauritius – 75th Anniversary of ICAO". The Postal History of ICAO. International Civil Aviation Organization.
- Aapravasi Ghat (Mauritius), No 1227 (Advisory body evaluation). International Council on Monuments and Sites. 10 April 2006.
- Le Morne Cultural Landscape (Mauritius), No 1259 (PDF) (Advisory body evaluation). International Council on Monuments and Sites. 11 March 2008.
- "Appointment of Sir Hilary Blood as Governor and Commander-in-Chief of Mauritius". The London Gazette. No. 38621. 27 May 1949. p. 2617.
- "Appointment of Sir Bede Clifford as Governor and Commander-in-Chief of Mauritius". The London Gazette. No. 34431. 31 August 1937. p. 5508.
- "Appointment of Sir Colville Deverell as Governor and Commander-in-Chief of Mauritius". The London Gazette. No. 41836. 6 October 1959. p. 6281.
- "Appointment of Sir Donald Mackenzie-Kennedy as Governor and Commander-in-Chief of Mauritius". The London Gazette. No. 35628. 10 July 1942. p. 3040.
- "Appointment of Sir John Shaw Rennie as Governor and Commander-in-Chief of Mauritius". The London Gazette. No. 42776. 7 September 1962. p. 7042.
- "Central Chancery of the Orders of Knighthood: Sir John Shaw Rennie, Governor-General (designate) of Mauritius". The London Gazette. No. 44544. 12 March 1968. p. 2973.
- "Appointment of Sir Robert Scott as Governor and Commander-in-Chief of Mauritius". The London Gazette. No. 40080. 22 January 1954. p. 506.
- "Central Chancery of the Orders of Knighthood: Arthur Leonard Williams, Governor-General (designate) of Mauritius". The London Gazette. No. 44647 (Supplement). 2 August 1968. p. 8507.
- "Mauritius Independence Act 1968 (c. 8)". legislation.gov.uk. The National Archives.
- "Special Mobile Force". Mauritius Police Force.
- "The Mauritius Police Force". Mauritius Police Force.
- "La Citadel". Mauritius Now. Mauritius Tourism Promotion Authority.
- "History". The Mauritius Turf Club. 12 March 2014. Archived from the original on 2 October 2022.
- "Sir John Pope Hennessy (K.C.M.G.), Governor of Mauritius". The Met Collection. Metropolitan Museum of Art. 93.10.27a, b.
- Mauritius Sugar Industry Research Institute (1953). First Annual Report of the Executive Board, 1953 (PDF). Port Louis: Mauritius Sugar Industry Research Institute.
- Mauritius Sugar Industry Research Institute (1960). Annual Report 1960 (PDF). Port Louis: Mauritius Sugar Industry Research Institute.
- Mauritius Sugar Industry Research Institute (1963). Annual Report 1963 (PDF). Port Louis: Mauritius Sugar Industry Research Institute.
- "Portrait sérieux de l'avocat et homme politique Adrien d'Epinay (1794-1839)". Paris Musées Collections (in French). Musée Carnavalet. S1655.
- Final Report of the Committee on the Review of the Legal Framework for Admission to Practise Law in Mauritius (PDF) (Report). Attorney General's Office, Mauritius. 10 March 2020.
- "Combat du Grand Port (ile de France) (24 Aout 1810). Galerie Historique de Versailles". Collections. Royal Museums Greenwich. PAF4778.
- "Isle of France No.1. View from the Deck of the Upton Castle Transport, of the British Army Landing". Collections. Royal Museums Greenwich. PAF4779.
- "Isle of France No.3. Part of the British Army, forming before Port Louis". Collections. Royal Museums Greenwich. PAF4781.
- "Isle of France No.4. Port Louis, from the Champ de Mars". Collections. Royal Museums Greenwich. PAF4782.
- Ross, Ronald (1909). Report on the Prevention of Malaria in Mauritius. London: J. & A. Churchill.
- "Histoire" (in French). Royal Society of Arts & Sciences of Mauritius. 25 November 2025.
- Hydrographic Department (1911). South Indian Ocean Pilot: For the Islands Westward of Longitude 80° East, Including Madagascar and the Comoro Islands (3rd ed.). London: Admiralty.
- Hydrographic Department (1946). South Indian Ocean Pilot: Comprising Madagascar, Iles Comores, Ile de la Réunion, Mauritius, the Seychelles, the Chagos Archipelago, and Other Islands Lying Westward of Longitude 80° East (6th ed.). London: Admiralty.
- "History". Supreme Court of Mauritius.
- Roger, Gilbert (21 November 2012). Rapport fait au nom de la commission des affaires étrangères, de la défense et des forces armées sur le projet de loi autorisant l'approbation de l'accord-cadre entre le Gouvernement de la République française et le Gouvernement de la République de Maurice sur la cogestion économique, scientifique et environnementale relative à l'île de Tromelin et à ses espaces maritimes environnants (PDF) (Report) (in French). Sénat. No. 143 (2012–2013).
- "Mauritius". First World War: A Global View. The National Archives. Archived from the original on 30 December 2022.
- Truth and Justice Commission (November 2011). Report of the Truth and Justice Commission (PDF). Vol. 1. Port Louis: Government Printing. Archived from the original (PDF) on 25 July 2017.
- Truth and Justice Commission (November 2011). Report of the Truth and Justice Commission (PDF). Vol. 3. Port Louis: Government Printing.
- Truth and Justice Commission (November 2011). Report of the Truth and Justice Commission (PDF). Vol. 4. Port Louis: Government Printing.
- "CO 1069-745-16: Oriental Bank, Place D'Armes, Port Louis". Flickr. The National Archives.
- "CO 1069-745-55: Reduit – Country Residence of Governor". Flickr. The National Archives.
- "CO 1069-745-5: Government House; View on Port Louis – Citadel". Flickr. The National Archives.
- "CO 1069-745-69: Queen's Reign Celebration – Unveiling of Statue". Flickr. The National Archives.
- "CO 1069-745-6: Roman Catholic Cathedral, Port Louis; Central Railway Station, Port Louis". Flickr. The National Archives.
- "CO 1069-746-17: Mahebourg Station (terminus of the Midland Line)". Flickr. The National Archives.
- "CO 1069-746-20: Souillac Station (terminus of the Savanne Line)". Flickr. The National Archives.
- "CO 1069-746-31: The Royal College". Flickr. The National Archives.
- "CO 1069-746-3: Port Louis, after the hurricane of April 1892". Flickr. The National Archives.
- Agreement between the Government of the United Kingdom of Great Britain and Northern Ireland and the Government of the Republic of Mauritius concerning the Chagos Archipelago including Diego Garcia (CS Mauritius No.1/2025, CP 1334) (Report). Foreign, Commonwealth and Development Office. 22 May 2025.
- "Aapravasi Ghat". World Heritage List. UNESCO World Heritage Centre.
- "Le Morne Cultural Landscape". World Heritage List. UNESCO World Heritage Centre.

=== Court decisions and pleadings ===
- Chagos Islanders v Attorney General and HM BIOT Commissioner, EWHC (QB) 2222 (High Court 9 October 2003).
- Legal Consequences of the Separation of the Chagos Archipelago from Mauritius in 1965, Advisory Opinion (PDF). I.C.J. Reports 2019. International Court of Justice. 25 February 2019. p. 95.
- Katra Holdings Ltd v Standard Chartered Bank (Mauritius) Ltd, UKPC 8 (Judicial Committee of the Privy Council 9 April 2024).
- Memorial of the Republic of Mauritius. Vol. I. Permanent Court of Arbitration. 1 August 2012.
- In the Matter of the Chagos Marine Protected Area Arbitration (Mauritius v. United Kingdom): Award (PDF). Permanent Court of Arbitration. 18 March 2015.
- State v Khoyratty, UKPC 13 (Judicial Committee of the Privy Council 22 March 2006).
- Counter-Memorial of the United Kingdom. Permanent Court of Arbitration. 15 July 2013.
- Written Statement of the United Kingdom (PDF). International Court of Justice. 15 February 2018.

=== Books and journals ===
- Allen, Richard B. (November 2011). "Land ownership by persons of African and Asian origin and descent" (PDF). Report of the Truth and Justice Commission. Vol. 2. Port Louis: Government Printing. pp. 46–60.
- Ballgobin, Dehoutee Vina (2011). "Rivalité et consensus à l'île Maurice : établissements scolaires publics du Collège National au Royal College". Revue historique de l'océan Indien (in French) (7): 232–246.
- Ballgobin, Dehoutee Vina (2012). "La représentation de John Jérémie par les habitants de l'ancienne Isle de France : 1829-1831". Revue historique de l'océan Indien (in French) (9): 60–70.
- Banton, Mandy (2020). Administering the Empire, 1801–1968: A Guide to the Records of the Colonial Office in the National Archives of the UK (PDF). London: University of London Press. doi:10.14296/0920.9781912702787. ISBN 978-1-912702-78-7.
- Bolton's Mauritius Almanac, and Official Directory, for 1851. Mauritius: A. J. Tennant. 1851.
- "Mauritius. Temple (Richard). Eight Views of the Mauritius Comprising the Positions of the British Army, Commanded by the Hon. Maj. Gen. J. Abercrombie, on the 29th & 30th of Nov. & 1st of Dec. 1810, Also of the Town and Harbour of Port Louis" (Sale 18942, lot 525). Bonhams. 4 October 2011.
- Buckner, Phillip (1976). "Colebrooke, Sir William MacBean George". Dictionary of Canadian Biography. Vol. 9. University of Toronto/Université Laval.
- Carmichael, Dugald (1811). Account of the Conquest of Mauritius: With Some Notices on the History, Soil, Products, Defences, and the Political Importance of This Island. Published anonymously, "by an officer who served on the expedition". London: T. Egerton.
- Chan Low, Jocelyn (2011). "The Colonial State and Labour Protest in the 1930s". Revue historique de l'océan Indien (8): 57–65.
- Chan Low, Jocelyn (2012). "La France des « Rétrocessionistes » (1912–1921)". Revue historique de l'océan Indien (in French) (9): 151–163.
- Mercer, W. H.; Collins, A. E., eds. (1903). The Colonial Office List for 1903. London: Waterlow & Sons.
- Chisholm, Hugh, ed. (1911). "Mauritius" . Encyclopædia Britannica. Vol. 17 (11th ed.). Cambridge University Press. pp. 912–915.
- Erny, Alfred (1863). "Séjour à l'île de Maurice (île de France)". Le Tour du monde (in French). 7: 113–144.
- Fageol, Pierre-Éric (2018). "La Réunion et le mouvement de rétrocession de l'île Maurice à la France (1918–1921)". Guerres mondiales et conflits contemporains (in French) (271): 91–112. doi:10.3917/gmcc.271.0091.
- Frankel, Jeffrey A. (December 2010). Mauritius: African Success Story (Report). NBER Working Paper. Cambridge, MA: National Bureau of Economic Research. doi:10.3386/w16569.
- Fuma, Sudel (2011). "Les enjeux politiques des Britanniques aux îles Mascareignes au XIXe. La version du gouverneur Farquhar". Revue historique de l'océan Indien (in French) (7): 82–88.
- Hertslet, Edward (1875). The Map of Europe by Treaty. Vol. 1. London: Butterworths.
- Houbert, Jean (1981). "Mauritius: Independence and Dependence". The Journal of Modern African Studies. 19 (1): 75–105.
- Kuczynski, R. R. (1949). Demographic Survey of the British Colonial Empire. Vol. II. London: Oxford University Press for the Royal Institute of International Affairs.
- "Context". Legacies of British Slavery. University College London.
- "John Irving the elder". Legacies of British Slavery. University College London.
- "Reid, Irving". Legacies of British Slavery. University College London.
- Lucas, C. P. (1888). A Historical Geography of the British Colonies. Vol. I: The Mediterranean and Eastern Colonies. Oxford: Clarendon Press.
- Lucas, C. P. (1906). A Historical Geography of the British Colonies. Vol. I: The Mediterranean and Eastern Colonies. Revised by R. E. Stubbs (2nd ed.). Oxford: Clarendon Press.
- Bolt, Jutta; van Zanden, Jan Luiten. "Maddison Project Database 2023". Groningen Growth and Development Centre. University of Groningen. doi:10.34894/INZBF2.
- Neveling, Patrick (May 2012). A Periodisation of Globalisation According to the Mauritian Integration into the International Sugar Commodity Chain (1825–2005) (PDF) (Report). Commodities of Empire Working Paper. Milton Keynes: Commodities of Empire Project. ISSN 1756-0098.
- Nwulia, Moses D. E. (1981). The History of Slavery in Mauritius and the Seychelles, 1810–1875. Rutherford, NJ: Fairleigh Dickinson University Press. ISBN 0-8386-2398-0.
- Oraison, André (2012). "Radioscopie critique de la querelle franco-mauricienne sur le récif de Tromelin (La succession d'États sur l'ancienne Isle de Sable)". Revue juridique de l'océan Indien (in French) (14): 5–118.
- Oraison, André (2015). "Réflexions critiques sur l'accord-cadre franco-mauricien du 7 juin 2010 relatif à la cogestion économique, scientifique et environnementale du récif de Tromelin et de ses espaces maritimes environnants". Revue juridique de l'océan Indien (in French) (20): 129–168.
- Pike, Nicolas (1873). Sub-Tropical Rambles in the Land of the Aphanapteryx: Personal Experiences, Adventures, and Wanderings in and around the Island of Mauritius. New York: Harper & Brothers.
- Pridham, Charles (1849). An Historical, Political and Statistical Account of Mauritius and Its Dependencies. London: T. and W. Boone.
- Pyeneeandee, Nuckiren (2009). "La toponymie à l'île Maurice : le témoin d'un dialogue interculturel". Revue historique de l'océan Indien (in French) (5): 437–450.
- Rapson, Edward James (1892). "Jeremie, John" . In Lee, Sidney (ed.). Dictionary of National Biography. Vol. 29. London: Smith, Elder & Co. pp. 339–340.
- Rose, John Holland (1911). "Decaen, Charles Mathieu Isidore, Count" . In Chisholm, Hugh (ed.). Encyclopædia Britannica. Vol. 7 (11th ed.). Cambridge University Press. p. 907.
- "School History". Royal College Curepipe. Archived from the original on 24 March 2023.
- Smith, George Barnett (1892). "Farquhar, Robert Townsend" . In Lee, Sidney (ed.). Dictionary of National Biography. Vol. 29. London: Smith, Elder & Co. pp. 223–224.
- Stephens, H. Morse (1887). "Cole, Galbraith Lowry" . In Stephen, Leslie (ed.). Dictionary of National Biography. Vol. 11. London: Smith, Elder & Co. pp. 264–266.
- Tatarsky, Allison; Aboobakar, Shahina; Cohen, Justin M.; et al. (2 September 2011). "Preventing the Reintroduction of Malaria in Mauritius: A Programmatic and Financial Assessment". PLOS ONE. 6 (9). e23832. Bibcode:2011PLoSO...623832T. doi:10.1371/journal.pone.0023832. PMC 3166284. PMID 21912645.
- Toth, Anthony (1995). "Mauritius: Historical Setting". In Metz, Helen Chapin (ed.). Indian Ocean: Five Island Countries. Area Handbook Series (3rd ed.). Washington, D.C.: Federal Research Division, Library of Congress.
- Macmillan, Allister, ed. (1914). Mauritius Illustrated: Historical and Descriptive, Commercial and Industrial Facts, Figures, & Resources. London: W. H. & L. Collingridge.

=== News and other sources ===
- "Grand Bassin: The Untold Story of its Transformation into a National Pilgrimage Site". Mauritius Times. 28 February 2025.
- Selvon, Sydney (22 February 2017). "The true nature of the retrocession movement in Mauritius prior to the birth of the Mauritius Labour Party". L'Express. Archived from the original on 3 June 2020.

=== United Nations documents ===
- "GDP per capita (current US$) – Mauritius". World Development Indicators. World Bank.
