= Lal =

Lal (Persian: لعل, Hindi: लाल, Bengali: লাল, Urdu: لال, Pashto: Lāl) is an Indo-Iranian surname and given name, which means "darling", "precious", or "beloved", from the Sanskrit lala ("cajoling"). In addition, Lal means "garnet" or "ruby" in Persian, "ruby" in Pashto, and "red" in Hindustani and Bengali. The name Lal may refer to mainly Kayastha as well as used by other communities:

== Surname ==
Lal is a surname related to honorific title Lal, and is found among various social groups and castes. The surname is also common in the Indian diaspora.

=== Notable people ===
- Akash Lal (born 1940), Indian cricketer
- Amrit Lal (1940s Southern Punjab cricketer)
- Amrit Lal (1960s Southern Punjab cricketer)
- Ananda Lal (born 1955), Indian theatre critic
- Arun Lal (born 1955), Indian cricketer
- B. B. Lal (1921–2022), Indian archaeologist
- Bansi Lal (1927–2006), Indian politician and two-time chief minister of Haryana
- Bhai Nand Lal (1633–1713), Persian poet
- Bhajan Lal (1930–2011), Indian politician
- Bihari Lal (1595–1663), Indian poet
- Brij Lal, Indo-Fijian politician
- Brij Lal (historian) (born 1952), Fijian historian
- Chatur Lal (1925–1965), Indian tabla player
- Chaudhary Devi Lal (1909–2001), Indian politician who twice served as Chief Minister of Haryana
- Chuni Lal (1968–2007) Indian Army soldier
- Deepak Lal (born 1940), British economist
- Durga Lal (1948–1990), Indian Kathak dancer
- Gobind Behari Lal (1889–1982), Indian journalist
- Jean Paul Lal (born 1988), Malayalam film director
- Kishan Lal (1917–1980), Indian field hockey player
- K. S. Lal (1920–2002), Indian historian
- Lallu Lal (1763–1835), Indian writer
- Madan Lal (born 1951), Indian cricket player and coach
- Mohanlal (born 1960), Indian Actor
- Nidhin Lal (born 1991), Indian footballer
- Padma Narsey Lal (born 1951), Fijian ecological economist
- Pancham Lal (born 1951), Indian Administrative Service officer
- Pratap Chandra Lal (1916–1982), Indian air marshal
- Prerna Lal (born 1984), Fijian writer
- Priyaa Lal (born 1993), British Indian actress
- Purshotam Lal (born 1954), Indian cardiologist
- Purushottama Lal (1929–2010), Indian writer
- Sanjay Lal (born 1969), American football coach
- Shaneel Lal (born 2000), Fijian-New Zealand activist
- Siddhartha Lal (born 1973), Indian businessman
- Sunder Lal, Indian freedom fighter
- Vikram Lal (born 1942), Indian businessman
- Vinay Lal (born 1961), Indian historian

== Given name ==
- Lal Bahadur Basnet (1926–1998), Indian politician
- Lal Behari Dey (1824–1892), Indian journalist
- Lal Jayawardena (1935–2004), Sri Lankan economist
- Lal Jose (born 1966), Indian filmmaker
- Lal Khan (born 1956), Pakistani political activist
- Lal Krishna Advani (born 1927), Indian politician
- Lal Mia (died 1960), Bengali politician
- Lal Muhammad Khan, Pakistani politician
- Lal Thanhawla (born 1942), Indian politician
- Lal Thanzara, Indian politician
- Lal Wickrematunge (born 1950), Sri Lankan businessman

== See also ==
- Lal (disambiguation)
- Lalu (disambiguation)
