= 1911 Curepipe riots =

- Date: 19 January 1911
- Location: Curepipe, Mauritius; 20°18′59″S 57°31′30″E
- Caused by: Ethnic tensions between Indian and Creole Mauritians; Political rivalries
- Methods: rioting, assault, destruction of property
- Result: Two deaths

The 1911 Curepipe riots refer to violent clashes which broke out in the historic town of Curepipe and then spread to Port Louis on the island of Mauritius on 19 January 1911. The riots also came to be known as Election Rabble Riots of 1911 by the administrators in London.

== Clash of rival gangs ==
The riots started out as a political disturbance in the town of Curepipe on Curepipe Road which resulted in a clash between Creole followers of Eugène Laurent (Action Libérale) against white Franco Mauritian supporters of Armand Esnouf (Parti de l'Ordre or Oligarchy). This came at a time when Eugène Laurent had celebrated his victory over his rival William Newton (Mauritius) at the 1911 elections held on 18 January 1911. Curepipe also happened to be where a significant number of prominent business people resided. Some of these residents of Curepipe were attacked when they departed from a train when it reached its destination in Port Louis. The rioters also destroyed several businesses located in the capital city of Port Louis.

The riots resulted in the death of two civilians.

== Military intervention ==
Eventually there was military intervention by the regiment which was stationed on the island. However they did not have to use their weapons. The regiment, consisting predominantly of Sikh soldiers, formed part of the Hong Kong Singapore Battalion, Royal Garrison Artillery

== Events prior to the 1911 Riots ==
There had been a build-up of political tension leading to the 1911 Riots. In fact the elections for the Council of Government were held in 1911. Due to the planned immigration of Indian labourers to the island since 1834 following the Abolition of Slavery there had been a significant change in the ethnic composition of the working population, made up mainly of Creoles and Indians. During the years prior to the 1911 riots the need for representation and better working and living conditions were being advocated by the likes of Adolphe de Plevitz and Manilal Doctor. In fact soon after his arrival in Mauritius in 1907 lawyer Manilal Doctor assisted the political party Action Libérale of Eugène Laurent in its campaign against its rival the Oligarchy Party.

On the other hand, there were continual debates over the suitability of the new Constitution. The 1909 Royal Commission of Enquiry witnessed a strong push to revert to the old Constitution of 1832.

== Royal Commission of Enquiry ==
A Royal Commission of Enquiry was instigated after the 1911 riots. There had been various such hearings in prior years but the riots exposed the need for legislative changes to meet the requirements of the complex society.
