= Ben Jannif =

Fijian footballer and politician (1907–1985)

Nominated Member of the Legislative Council
- In office 1950–1953

Personal details
- Born: 25 November 1908 Suva, Fiji
- Died: 22 March 1985 (aged 76) Suva, Fiji

Ben Mohammed Jannif OBE (25 November 1908 – 22 March 1985) was an Indo-Fijian businessman, scout leader, soccer administrator and politician. He was one of the architects of Fiji Indian Football Association and served as a member of the Legislative Council from 1950 to 1953.

== Early life ==
Jannif was born in Suva in November 1908, and educated at the Marist Convent School in Levuka. He began working at Caine's Photographic Studio in 1925, becoming a partner in 1935 and sole owner in 1953, with the company name being changed to Caines Jannif. He was also a director of the Central Manufacturing Company and became the first Indo-Fijian president of the Suva Chamber of Commerce.

Between 1928 and 1938 Jannif was an administrator, coach and referee with Indian Reform League football team and was closely associated with the formation of the Suva, Rewa and Levuka district football teams. Following the formation of the Fiji Indian Football Association in October 1938, he took on the dual responsibilities of Treasurer (1938–39) and Secretary (1938–44). He worked on the first constitution of the association that was adopted in 1939. He started charging gate fees for entry into soccer tournaments in 1947. He was appointed a life member of the Fiji Football Association for his services to football in Fiji and continued to be actively involved in soccer administration into the 1970s.

Jannif was also involved in other voluntary organisations; he joined the Fiji Scouts Association at an early age and rose to become Chief Scout Commissioner. He was the first Indo-Fijian to hold the King's Scout Badge, attended Jamborees in New Zealand and Australia and was awarded the Silver Acorn for his services to the Scouts movement. He was one of the first locally born members to join the Rotary Club of Suva and was its first Indo-Fijian president. He also served as Vice President of the Royal Society for Prevention of Cruelty to Animals, was a member of the Council of the Automobile Association and contributed to the establishment of the Indian High School in Suva, serving as a member of the school committee. He joined the Fiji Military Forces and remained an active member of the Indian Platoon until it was disbanded in 1940.

In 1950 he was appointed to the Legislative Council as one of the nominated Indo-Fijian members, serving until 1953. He was awarded an MBE in the 1958 Birthday Honours and an OBE in the 1985 New Year Honours. He died in March 1985.
