= Ram Singh (Fiji) =

Early 20th-century Fiji Indian businessman

Babu Ram Singh was a Fiji Indian who had come to Fiji under the indenture system and was one of the few people who, after indenture, prospered and made an attempt to help his less fortunate ex-indentured brethren. Babu Ram Singhs surviving Business, Fiji Rubber Stamp Co Ltd is still under operation in Mark Street, Suva, and is looked after by his children.

== Successful businessman ==
There were few roads in Fiji around 1900 and the main form of transportation was by boat. Ram Singh saw this as a business opportunity, acquired a launch and started providing passenger and cargo facilities to communities living along the coasts of the islands of Fiji and along the banks of its numerous rivers.

== Leadership through Indian Imperial Association ==
Ram Singh was one of the founding members of the Indian Imperial Association of Fiji (IIA) and together with Totaram Sanadhya was instrumental in persuading Mahatma Gandhi to send an Indian lawyer, Manilal Doctor, to Fiji. Manilal arrived in 1912 and took up the leadership of the IIA, as president and Ram Singh became its Secretary. The Indian Imperial Association of Fiji (I.I.A.) came into existence in Fiji on 2 June 1918. The association contained mainly educated Fiji Indians. It sent petitions to the Government seeking review of marriage law, an end to the death penalty and representation into the Legislative Council. The aim of the association was to ‘watch the interests of and to assist in the general improvement of the Indian community in Fiji’. As president of the I.I.A., Manilal Doctor wrote to Mahatma Gandhi, other Indian leaders and the British Labour Party on the sad plight of Indian indentured labourers in Fiji. C.F. Andrews and W.W. Pearson were dispatched to Fiji to enquire into the complaints. Manilal Doctor made submissions for their report, published on 29 February 1916, which reported on the deplorable living conditions of the indentured labourers and their lack of access to education and medical facilities.

Ram Singh remained an active member of the IIA and in 1919 joined in the campaign to stop the resumption of the indenture system. Ram Singh and Manilal Doctor organised a conference, of Fiji Indians, in Suva on 26 December 1919, which passed resolutions highlighting the difficulties being faced by Indians in Fiji. The Government tried to ignore the IIA, but it led to the strike of Indian labourers which began on 15 January 1920. As a result of the strike, Manilal was deported from Fiji and the IIA collapsed. In 1924, Ram Singh tried to revive the IIA as the Indian Association of Fiji, with representatives from all sections of the Indian community and with the aims of moral social educational and political uplift of the Indians. The IIA made representations to the Secretary of State for the Colonies, but was ignored and became ineffective.

== Member of Arya Samaj in Fiji ==
Ram Singh was a member of the Arya Samaj in Fiji. He was the printer and publisher of the Hindi language newspaper, Fiji Samachar and together with Vishnu Deo (who was the editor) was involved in conflict with other sections of the Indian community as a result of which he was sued for libel.

== See also ==
- Indian Imperial Association
- Arya Samaj in Fiji
- Fiji Samachar
