= Global Girmit Museum =

Museum in Saweni, Lautoka, Fiji

Coordinates: 17°38′30.02″S 177°25′15.33″E

- Sugar cane cutting and gathering by labourers
- Type: Museum
- Location: Lautoka
- Origins: Global Girmit Museum Project Team
- Region served: Fiji
- Services: Research and curation of Fiji's Girmitiya national heritage
- Website: globalgirmitinstitute.org

The Global Girmit Institute (GGI) Museum is co-located with the GGI Library at its headquarters in Saweni, Lautoka, Fiji. Girmit is a corruption of the English word, “agreement” from the indenture agreement the British government made with Indian labourers that consisted of specifics such as the length of stay in Fiji. The labourers came to be known as Girmityas.

== Background ==
Under the GGI Organisation, the Museum records Girmitiya history in Fiji from 1879 to 1916 when some 60,500 labourers came to Fiji. One of the outcomes of the first conference organised by the GGI in 2017 was the establishment of a girmit museum.

== History ==
The museum has been in the current location in Lautoka since the opening in May 2018 with the introduction of a library.

== Collections ==
The museum will hold a collection of Fiji Indian artefacts as well as recordings of oral history of peoples from different linguistic backgrounds and cultures. Objects relating to farming and the sugar industry, lifestyle, music, food preparation, clothing and religious events will be displayed as well as objects that record the impact of colonialism on the islands.

== See also ==
- Girmityas
- Indian indenture system
- Arya Samaj in Fiji
- Fiji Hindi
- Indo-Fijians
- South Indians in Fiji
- Gujaratis in Fiji
- Hinduism in Fiji
- Islam in Fiji
- Sikhism in Fiji
