= Brij Lal (historian) =

Fijian historian (1952–2021)

Brij Lal AM, FAHA, OF
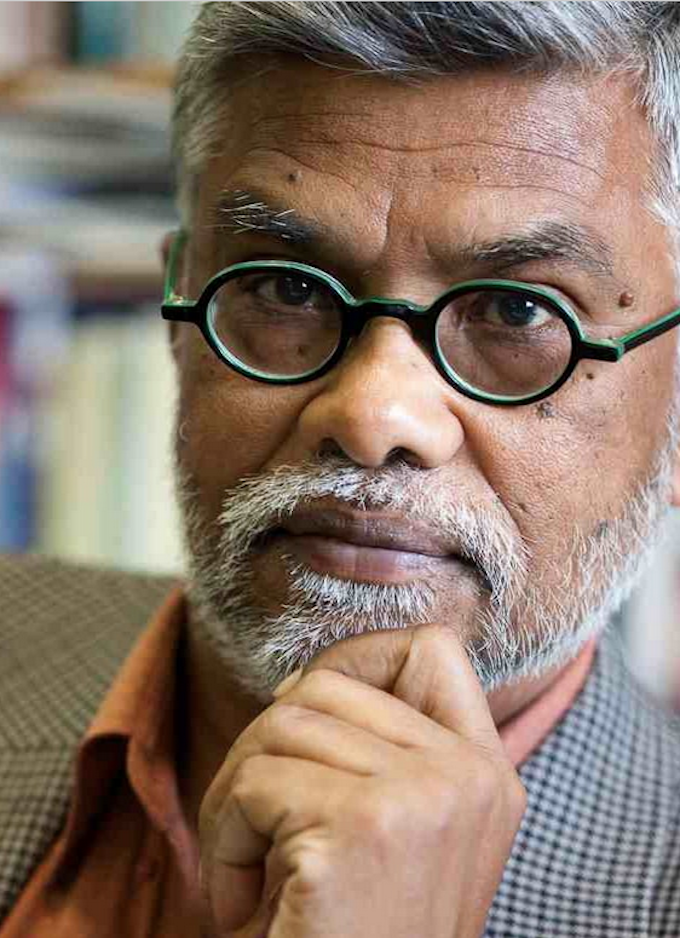
- Lal in 2014
- Born: Brij Vilash Lal; 21 August 1952; Labasa, Colony of Fiji
- Died: 25 December 2021 (aged 69); Brisbane, Queensland, Australia
- Education: University of the South Pacific; University of British Columbia; Australian National University
- Occupations: Historian, Professor, Writer
- Spouse: Padma Lal

Brij Vilash Lal AM, FAHA, OF (21 August 1952 – 25 December 2021) was an Indo-Fijian historian who wrote about the Pacific region and the Indian indenture system. A harsh critic of the Bainimarama government, which originated in the military coup of 2006 and retained power in the 2014 elections, he lived in exile in Australia.

== Early life ==
Lal was born in 1952 in Tabia, Labasa on the northern island of Vanua Levu, Fiji to illiterate parents. His paternal grandfather was a North Indian indentured sugar cane farmer in Fiji, known as a 'girmitya', - the focus of Lal's early academic research. He completed an undergraduate degree in history at the University of the South Pacific. He went on to do an MA (1976) at the University of British Columbia and a PhD (1980) at the Australian National University.

== Academic career ==
Lal was professor of Pacific and Asian History at the School of Culture, History and Language at Australian National University from 1990 until his retirement in 2015, when he was appointed an emeritus professor. He previously taught at the University of Hawaii at Manoa from 1983 to 1990. He also lectured at University of the South Pacific in Suva and at the University of Papua New Guinea. He held visiting positions at the University of the South Pacific and the University of Cambridge, and served as head of the Centre for Diasporic Studies at the University of Fiji.

Among his many books are an autobiography, Mr Tulsi's Store: A Fijian Journey (2001), which was named a "Notable" book by the San Francisco-based Kiriyama Prize in 2002. He was also the author of Chalo Jahaji: On a journey through indenture in Fiji (2000) and editor of Bittersweet: The Indo-Fijian Experience (2004), the latter two recounting the history of the trials and triumphs of the Indo-Fijian community. He was the Editor of the Journal of Pacific History and the founding editor of the literary journal, Conversations.

== Honours ==
Lal was elected a fellow of the Australian Academy of the Humanities (FAHA) in 1996. On 1 January 2001 he was awarded an Australian Centenary Medal "for service to Australian society and the humanities in the study of Pacific history". Lal was made an Officer of the Order of Fiji (OF) in 1998, following his role on the 1995 Fijian Constitution Review Committee.

Lal was made a Member of the Order of Australia (AM) in the 2015 Queen's Birthday Honours (Australia) "for significant service to education, through the preservation and teaching of Pacific history, as a scholar, author and commentator".

He was honoured by the Fiji Millennium Committee for distinguished scholarship, and was also named as one of the seventy people who helped shape Fiji's history in the 20th century.

== Political engagement ==
In the 1990s, Lal served as the nominee of the Leader of the opposition, Jai Ram Reddy on the three-member Constitutional Review Commission, whose work culminated in the adoption of the 1997 Constitution in 1997–1998.

Lal condemned the Military coup d'état which deposed the government of Prime Minister Laisenia Qarase on 5 December 2006. Fiji Live quoted him as saying on 7 December that the coup was not different in essence from the two coups staged by Sitiveni Rabuka in 1987, or George Speight's coup of 2000. This time, however, race was not seen to be a factor, he said, unlike the previous occasions when ethnic issues were used, he claimed, as a scapegoat for other interests.

In November 2009, Lal discussed the ongoing political situation in Fiji after the expulsion of the Australian and New Zealand high commissioners, in an interview with Radio New Zealand. Shortly afterwards he was taken into custody and questioned about his comments. During the questioning, Lal reported that he was subjected to foul language and advised to leave the country within 24 hours, which he did. Lal has subsequently clarified that he was expelled rather than being deported.

== Forced exile ==
In March 2015, Defence Minister Timoci Natuva announced that Lal was prohibited indefinitely from returning to Fiji because his actions were "prejudicial to the peace, defence, public safety, public order and security of Government of Fiji". This decision was reiterated in late June or early July 2015. Lal reacted angrily to the ban on his return:

The original decision was based on the false premise that I opposed Fiji's return to democracy after the coup of 2006," he said. "That is a travesty of the truth and of the historical record. I did nothing of the sort. And it is ludicrous to assert that my wife and I are a threat to the security of Fiji. The decision is nothing short of petty vindictiveness. We are disappointed but the Government is diminished by it. For our part, we will continue to stand up for the principles and values we believe in," he told the Fiji Times by e-mail on 2 July 2015.

== Personal life and death ==
Lal was married to fellow-academic Padma Lal. She too has been prohibited from returning to Fiji. He died at his residence in Brisbane on 25 December 2021, at the age of 69.

Following the 2022 Fijian general election, the new government led by Sitiveni Rabuka revoked the prohibition order on Lal's wife, allowing her to return his ashes to Fiji.

== Bibliography ==
- Brij Lal, Girmityas: The Origins of the Fiji Indians, Journal of Pacific History, Canberra, 1983
- Brij Lal (ed), Politics in Fiji: studies in contemporary history, Allen & Unwin, Sydney, 1986
- Brij Lal, Power and prejudice: the making of the Fiji crisis, New Zealand Institute of International Affairs, 1988
- Brij Lal, Broken waves: A history of Fiji Islands in the twentieth century, University of Hawaii Press, Honolulu, 1992
- Brij Lal (ed), Pacific islands history: journeys and transformations, Journal of Pacific History, Canberra, 1992
- Sir Paul Reeves, Tomasi Rayalu Vakatora, and Brij Lal, The Fiji Islands: towards a united future: report of the Fiji Constitution Review Commission, Fiji Constitution Review Commission, Suva, 1996
- Brij Lal, A vision for change: A.D. Pagel and the politics of Fiji, National Centre for Development Studies, Canberra, 1997
- Brij Lal, Another way: the politics of constitutional reform in post-coup Fiji, Asia Pacific Press, Canberra, 1998
- Brij Lal, Fiji before the storm: elections and the politics of development, Asia Pacific Press, Canberra, 2000
- Brij Lal and Kate Fortune, The Pacific Islands: An Encyclopedia, University of Hawaii Press, Honolulu, 2000
- Brij Lal, Mr Tulsi's store: a Fijian journey, Pandanus Books, Canberra, 2001
- Brij Lal and Michael Pretes (eds.), Coup: reflections on the political crisis in Fiji, Pandanus Books, Canberra, 2001
- Brij Lal, photographs by Peter Hendrie, Bittersweet: the Indo-Fijian experience, Pandanus Books, Canberra, 2004
- Brij Lal (editor), The encyclopedia of the Indian diaspora, National University of Singapore, Singapore, 2006
- Jon Fraenkel, Stewart Firth, and Brij Lal (eds), The 2006 military takeover in Fiji: a coup to end all coups?, ANU E Press, Canberra, 2006
- Doug Munro and Brij Lal (ed.), Texts and contexts: reflections in Pacific Islands historiography, University of Hawaii Press, Honolulu, 2006
- Doug Munro and Brij Lal, "Journeys and transformations", The Ivory Tower and Beyond : Participant Historians of the Pacific, Newcastle upon Tyne, Cambridge Scholars Publishing, 2009, pp. 243–309.
- Brij Lal, In the eye of the storm: Jai Ram Reddy and the politics of postcolonial Fiji, ANU E Press, Canberra, 2010
- Brij Lal, Intersections: history, memory, discipline, Fiji Institute of Applied Studies, 2011
- Brij Lal, Chalo Jahaji: on a journey through indenture in Fiji, ANU E Press, Canberra, 2012
- Brij Lal, Turnings: Fiji factions, ANU E Press, Canberra, 2013
- Brij Lal, Historical dictionary of Fiji, Rowman & Littlefield, ANU E Press, 2013
- Bill Gammage, Brij Lal, and Gavan Daws (ed.), The boy from Boort: remembering Hank Nelson, ANU Press, Canberra, 2014
- Brij Lal (ed.), The Coombs: a house of memories, ANU Press, Canberra, 2014
- Brij Lal, Levelling Wind: Remembering Fiji, ANU Press, Acton, Australian Capital Territory, 2019
