= Gnanadicarayen Arlanda =

Mauritian politician

The Right Honourable Gnanadicarayen Arlandaz MP

Member of Legislative Council
- In office 1886–1891

Personal details
- Born: Rue des Pamplemousses, Port Louis, Mauritius
- Party: Reform Party

Gnanadicarayen Arlanda, more commonly known as Louis Arlanda or Gnanadicarayen Louis Arlanda was a Mauritian politician and businessman. He was the first Indo-Mauritian to become a member of the ruling Council, which was an early form of modern-day National Assembly or Parliament of Mauritius.

== Early life ==
Gnanadicarayen Louis Arlanda was born at Rue Des Pamplemousses in the capital city of Port Louis. His father was Gnanon Arlanda who had migrated from Pondicherry, India to Mauritius when the island was under French colonial rule before 1810.

== Career ==
Gnanadicarayen Louis Arlanda became a wealthy land owner and agriculturist. He financed the growing Indian Mission and became a negotiator. Louis Arlanda was especially influential amongst the small growers of Indian origins.

== Politics ==
Following Sir Virgile Naz's recommendation Governor John Pope Hennessy nominated Gnanadicarayen Arlanda as the first Indo-Mauritian member of the ruling Council in 1886. However the influential sugar oligarchy had supported Arlanda's rival Emile Sandapa who was also of Indian origins. Despite all the criticism of the likes of Célicourt Antelme councilor Arlanda served until 1891.

With the revised Constitution of Mauritius (1885) provisions were being made for fairer representation of the population in politics. Creole leader Onesipho Beaugeard published Cens Démocratique which advocated better representation of the coloureds. The new Constitution created both nominated and elected positions in the Council primarily for the white and fair-skinned Creole elite who owned real estate; allowance started to be made to represent the growing Indo-Mauritian populace. At the same time two main political parties took shape: the pro-Hennessy Reform Party of Sir William Newton where as the anti-Hennessy party Democrats was led by Gustave de Coriolis and Onésipho Beaugeard.
