= 1886 Mauritian general election =

Results by constituency

General elections were held for the first time in Mauritius between 11 and 20 January 1886. They followed the introduction of a new constitution the previous year. The Democrats and Reformists (also known as the Oligarchs) each won five of the ten elected seats.

== Electoral system ==
The new constitution provided for a 28-member Council of Government, which consisted of the Governor, 12 officials, 5 appointed members and 10 elected members. The ten elected members were returned from nine constituencies formed from the nine districts, which all districts returning one member except Port Louis, which returned two. Voting took place in each constituency on a different day, starting in Port Louis on 11 January and ending in Grand Port on 20 January.

The franchise for the elections was severely limited; the right to vote was restricted to male British subjects aged 21 and over and who possessed ₨300 of immovable property or movable property worth ₨3,000, a monthly salary of ₨50, those paying rent of ₨25 a month or paying a licence duty of at ₨200 a year. People married to eligible voters, or the oldest son of a qualifying widow were also entitled to vote. As a result, although the population of Mauritius was 359,688, only 4,061 people were eligible to vote, of which just 253 were Asian.

== Campaign ==
A total of 25 candidates contested the elections; led by William Newton, the Reformists nominated ran candidates in all ten constituencies. The Democrats put forward nine, with their leader Onésipho Beaugeard running in two constituencies. The remaining six candidates were independents, one of whom (Arthur Pitot) also ran in two candidates.

Despite the limited franchise, election notices were published in English, French, Hindustani (written in Arabic script), Tamil and Chinese.

== Results ==
Party	Votes	%	Seats
Democrats	2,709	49.21	5
Reformists	2,136	38.80	5
Independents	660	11.99	0
Total	5,505	100.00	10
Registered voters/turnout	4,061	–	
Source: Le Mauricien

=== By constituency ===
Constituency	Candidate	Party	Votes	%
Flacq (222 registered)	Charles Adam	Reformists	125	59.5
Flacq (222 registered)	Yves Pierre Jollivet	Democrats	85	40.5
Grand Port (273 registered)	Henri Joseph Portal	Reformists	109	50.5
Grand Port (273 registered)	Edgar Gallet	Democrats	62	28.7
Grand Port (273 registered)	Fabien Rault	Independent	45	20.8
Moka (187 registered)	Henri Leclézio	Reformists	137	81.5
Moka (187 registered)	Onésipho Beaugeard	Democrats	31	18.5
Pamplemousses (270 registered)	Charles Joseph Planel	Democrats	156	51.8
Pamplemousses (270 registered)	W A Edwards	Reformists	96	31.9
Pamplemousses (270 registered)	De Evenor Chazal	Independent	45	15.0
Pamplemousses (270 registered)	Louis Vigoureux	Independent	4	1.3
Plaines Wilhems (653 registered)	Célicourt Antelme	Democrats	407	67.3
Plaines Wilhems (653 registered)	Povah Ambrose	Reformists	194	32.1
Plaines Wilhems (653 registered)	Arthur Pitot	Independent	4	0.7
Port Louis (1,986 registered)	Onésipho Beaugeard	Democrats	941	26.4
Port Louis (1,986 registered)	Gustave de Coriolis	Democrats	879	24.7
Port Louis (1,986 registered)	William Newton	Reformists	705	19.8
Port Louis (1,986 registered)	John Alexander Ferguson	Independent	523	14.7
Port Louis (1,986 registered)	Georges Guibert	Reformists	511	14.4
Rivière du Rempart (163 registered)	Edgar Antelme	Democrats	61	39.6
Rivière du Rempart (163 registered)	Louis Rouillard	Reformists	55	35.7
Rivière du Rempart (163 registered)	P L Chastellier	Independent	38	24.7
Rivière Noire (115 registered)	Vincent Geoffroy	Reformists	55	51.4
Rivière Noire (115 registered)	Thorny Pitot	Democrats	51	47.7
Rivière Noire (115 registered)	Arthur Pitot	Independent	1	0.9
Savanne (192 registered)	Virgile Naz	Reformists	149	80.5
Savanne (192 registered)	Anderson James Forrester	Democrats	36	19.5
