= Gujaratis in Fiji =

Ethnic community

Many of Fiji's Indian population, who are descendants of Indian indentured labourers brought to Fiji between 1879 and 1916, the Gujaratis came to Fiji as free immigrants beginning in 1904. South Indians also came as free immigrants, mostly as government officials, teachers, lawyers and doctors. While the labourers focussed on work by generally taking up farming, the Gujaratis were traders and craftsmen. In the Indo-Fijian population as a whole, the caste system disappeared within a few years of indenture, but the Gujaratis still maintain it and very rarely marry outside their caste. The Gujaratis continue to maintain strong links with India, usually sending their sons and daughters to be married there while the rest of Fiji's Indian population are often more progressive, allowing intercaste marriages.

== Arrival of Gujaratis in Fiji ==
The first Gujaratis in Fiji were two goldsmiths (of the Sonar caste), who arrived in Fiji in 1904 from Natal, but were originally from Porbandar in the Kathiawar district of Gujarat with the support of Totaram Sanadhya. Four years later, other goldsmiths arrived, and they were soon followed by warriors, tailors (such as the famous Divek Lal), barbers, launderers and shoemakers from Surat and Navsari who were mainly of the Soni caste. Between 1916 and 1920, of the 752 Gujaratis who applied to migrate to Fiji, 336 were from Surat, 296 from Navsari and 120 were from Kathiawar. Patels, began arriving in 1914, and came mainly from Baroda State and the Nadiad district of the Bombay Presidency, and although most of them were farmers in India, they became grocers, drapers and laundrymen in Fiji. The first Patels were Appabhai Lalubhai and Chimanbahi, who together with J.P. Maharaj formed the A.J.C. Patel and Company with stores in Sigatoka, Nadi, Lautoka and Ba. The most famous of the Patels were the lawyer brothers A. D. Patel, R. D. Patel, and S. B. Patel. The Gujarati population steadily grew from 324 in 1921 to 1,200 in 1930, 2500 in 1935, and 5400 in 1956.

== Gujarati dominance of Fiji's retail trade ==
Once the Gujarati immigrants had established themselves in Fiji, other relatives usually followed. They continued to maintain close ties with their districts of origin, received goods from their relatives in India, remitted money and returned home to get married and bring their wives back to Fiji. New arrivals were assisted by relatives in Fiji and were very successful in business, being thrifty and hardworking with a strong sense of loyalty to other members of their caste. Between 1924 and 1945, of the 600 businesses registered in Fiji, Gujaratis held 300 trading licenses.

== Conflict between Gujaratis and Fijian Indians ==
The Sikhs, who arrived in Fiji at almost the same time as the Gujaratis, also maintained their identity, but unlike the Gujaratis, took Hindu spouses and interacted with other Indians, mainly as farmers. The Gujaratis, on the other hand, maintained their own language and caste and remained aloof from girmits, while residing mainly in towns. There were numerous calls for them to be deported from Fiji. This division was exploited in the 1937 election, when a little-known son of an indentured labourer, Chattur Singh, defeated the highly educated lawyer A.D. Patel, after turning the election into a contest between Fiji-born and India-born.

== Famous Gujaratis in Fiji ==
One of the first Gujaratis to gain fame in Fiji was Manilal Doctor, who arrived in Fiji in 1912 after pleas by Fiji Indians, especially Totaram Sanadhya, to Gandhi to send a barrister (lawyer) to defend Indians' rights in Fiji. He was deported from Fiji following the 1920 strike. A.D. Patel and S.B. Patel arrived in Fiji in the late 1920s, and both played a key role in Fiji-Indian politics, but while A.D. Patel was thrust into the leadership of various organisations, S.B. Patel usually worked in the background. Gujaratis have taken a leading role in the areas of law, medicine and commerce in Fiji. As Gujaratis are concentrated in the towns, they generally take a leading role in town and city council politics.

== Bibliography ==
- Gillion, Kenneth (1973). Fiji's Indian Migrants: A history to the end of indenture in 1920. Melbourne: Oxford University Press. ISBN 0-19-550452-6.
- Lal, Brij (1997). A Vision for Change: A.D. Patel and the politics of Fiji. Canberra: Australian National University. ISBN 0-7315-2350-4.
