= List of All India Forward Bloc candidates in the 2014 Indian general election =

On 21 March 2014 the All India Forward Bloc released its first list of candidates for the 2014 Lok Sabha election. The list included candidates for 38 seats in West Bengal, Maharashtra, Assam, Uttar Pradesh, Bihar, Haryana, Jharkhand, Andaman and Nicobar Islands, Odisha, Rajasthan, Karnataka and Delhi. According to the party general secretary Debabrata Biswas the main objective of the party in the elections was "to strengthen and unite the Left, democratic and secular forces to achieve an alternative policy for reconstruction of the country".

== Bihar ==
Pancham Lal joined the party on 18 March 2014, and was nominated for the Pataliputra seat. Lal had been a senior civil servant. He retired from his post as chief secretary in 2012. During his administrative career, he faced opposition from several different Chief Ministers as he criticised corruption and criminal links of state ministers. He had earlier been associated with the Indian National Congress and the Samajwadi Party. Commenting on his candidature, Lal stated that his foremost objective was not to win the Lok Sabha seat but "to raise the cause of the oppressed and weaker sections, who are exploited and victimized".

== Karnataka ==
The party fielded G.R. Shivshankar, secretary of its Karnataka state unit, in the Bangalore South seat. He is the president of the labour wing of the party, the Trade Union Coordination Committee (TUCC).

== Kerala ==
No candidates from Kerala were included in the first list released on 21 March 2014. On 11 March 2014 the party chairman K. Velappan Nair stated that the party would contest four seats in the state; Kollam, Idukki, Thrissur and Kannur. The All India Secretary of the party, G. Devarajan, would contest from Kollam, whilst no names were given for the three other seats. G. Devarajan would contested against the Left Democratic Front nominee and CPI(M) leader M.A. Baby and the United Democratic Front nominee N.K. Premachandran of the RSP. Three days later G. Devarajan stated that he would withdraw his candidature if the party was included in the LDF and that talks with CPI(M) were ongoing.

== Maharashtra ==
The party fielded the candidacy of veteran pro-Vidarbha statehood leader Jambuwantrao Dhote in the Nagpur seat. Dhote had won the Nagpur seat in the 1971 election as an All India Forward Bloc candidate but had since contested on behalf of many other parties. Another pro-Vidarbha statehood leader, Sandesh Bhalekar from the Parivartan Morcha, was fielded by the party in the Ramtek seat. In a statement made in early February 2014, commenting on his return to the party, Dhote stated that the ambition of the All India Forward Bloc was to contest all ten Lok Sabha seats in Vidarbha. At the time he hinted that the party was seeking to establish a pre-poll pact with the Janata Dal (United), the Indian Union Muslim League and the Shivrajya Party. Dhote was elected deputy chairman of the party at its 17th congress in September 2013.

== West Bengal ==
In West Bengal the party contests elections as part of the Left Front. In regards to the two West Bengal seats that it won in the 2009 election, the party decided to field incumbent parliamentarian Narahari Mahato in the Purulia seat whilst fielding a new candidate in the Cooch Behar seat.

== List of candidates ==
State/UT No.	Constituency	Reserved for (SC/ST/None)	Candidate
Andaman & Nicobar	Andaman & Nicobar	None	M.K Thakur
Assam	Tezpur	None	Rajen Saikia
Assam	Jorhat	None	Haren Borgonhai
Assam	Kaliabor	None	Mithul Kumar (Tanti)
Assam	Nowgong	None	Rafikul Islam
Assam	Dibrugarh	None	Cheniram Moran
Assam	Barpeta	None	Rabbul Islam
Bihar	Muzaffarpur	None	Ravindra Lal Karna
Bihar	Sheohar	None	Ramashankar Singh
Bihar	Arrah	None	Shriprakash Tiwari (Munna Tiwari)
Bihar	Pataliputra	None	Pancham Lal
Delhi	West Delhi	None	Charanjeet Singh
Haryana	Kurukshetra	None	Manoj Kumar
Haryana	Karnal	None	Ashish Sharma
Haryana	Sonipat	None	Ram Mehar
Jharkhand	Kodarma	None	Raghunandan Prasad Biswakarma
Jharkhand	Giridih	None	Sanjib Kumar
Jharkhand	Singhbhum	ST	Miran Munda
Karnataka	Bangalore South	None	G.R. Shivashankar
Maharashtra	Nagpur	None	Jambuwantrao Dhote
Maharashtra	Ramtek	SC	Sandesh Bhalekar
Maharashtra	Bhandara-Gondiya	None	Ram Dayal Hirkane
Maharashtra	Yavatmal-Washim	None	Jambuwantrao Dhote
Maharashtra	Amravati	SC	Narayan Dhangar
Maharashtra	Osmanabad	None	Shiv Das Lakhadive
Maharashtra	Nashik	None	Mahesh Avaad
Maharashtra	Hingoli	None	Sheikh Sultan
Odisha	Kalahandi	None	Mrityunjaya Prasad
Rajasthan	Jaipur	None	Navraj Sharma
Uttar Pradesh	Kanpur	None	Arun Sharma
Uttar Pradesh	Mainpuri	None	Veer Singh Chauhan
Uttar Pradesh	Sitapur	None	Jagmohan Singh Verma
Uttar Pradesh	Ballia	None	Jairam Pandey
Uttar Pradesh	Baghpat	None	Narendra Kumar
Uttar Pradesh	Gonda	None	Shriram Yadav
West Bengal	Purulia	None	Narahari Mahato
West Bengal	Barasat	None	Murtoza Hossain
West Bengal	Cooch Behar	SC	Dipak Kumar Roy
