= Ajit Swaran Singh =

Fijian-born-Indian-New Zealand judge

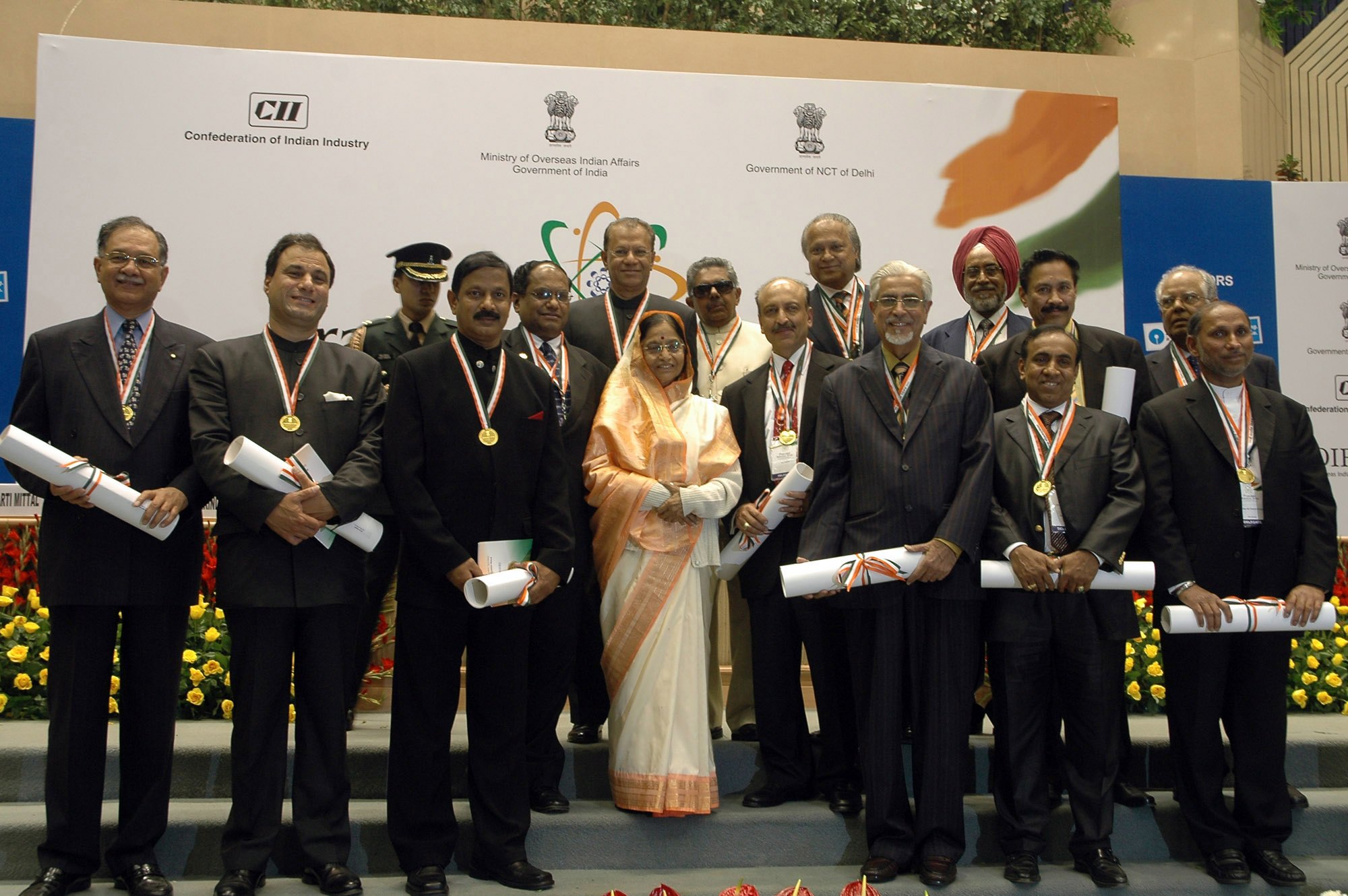
Ajith, other awardees stand with President of India in 2008

Dr. Ajit Swaran Singh is a Fijian-born-Indian-New Zealand judge who is appointed to the District Court Bench in New Zealand when he was sworn in as a judge in Manukau on 4 November 2002. He joined Wellington-based Ombudsman Judge Anand Satyanand (later the Governor-General) whose parents are of Fiji Indian descent, and Judge Avinash Deobhakta, of the Auckland District Court, who is an Indian from Uganda, as judges of New Zealand who are of Indian origin.

Judge Singh was also the first to be sworn into the high office on the Guru Granth Sahib, the Holy Book of the Sikh community.Judge Singh is the son of Sardar Swaran Singh, and nephew of the late Sarvan Singh, a well known lawyer and Member of Parliament in Fiji. He was born in Labasa and studied at Labasa Secondary School, now renamed Labasa College.

== Award ==
Year	Country	Award name	Given by	Field of Merit
2008	New Zealand	Pravasi Bharatiya Samman	President of India	Public Affairs
