= Labasa College =

Coordinates: 16.4292°S 179.3712°E

Information
- Former name: Labasa Secondary School (1954-1978)
- Established: 1954; 72 years ago
- Forms: 3-7
- Enrollment: c.780 (2023)
- Publication: The Labasan

Labasa College is a state secondary school for Forms 3 to 7 in Labasa, Fiji. It has a roll of more than 780 students as of January 2023, including a collection of boarding students from across the Northern Division of Fiji.

== History ==
Labasa College was established as Labasa Secondary School (LSS) in 1954 and was known as that until 1978 when the name “Labasa College” was incepted. In its over five-decade history, the institution was abbreviated to 'College' for most citizens of Northern Fiji. After taking the school under its wing in the 1970s, the Government's proposed delivery of maximal higher education to the students of the Northern Division, the education delivery system at Labasa College was streamlined to only cater for Forms 5 to 7. This in turn resulted in Labasa College being home to the largest stream of Form 7 students for any high school in Fiji.

Although the provision of vocational education was one of the key factors for the establishment of Labasa Secondary School in the early 1950s, its importance has gradually diminished as far as the school curriculum is concerned. Its struggle to make ground once again has seen tremendous challenges as changing lifestyles and thought patterns of parents and students in the Northern Division have inevitably prioritized academic prowess above anything.

2013 witnessed the re-establishment of Form 3 education at Labasa College for the first time in almost 35 years. The graduation of the current class into Form 4 in 2014 will once again revamp Labasa College to a full Form 3 to 7 secondary school.

=== Annual publication ===
'The Labasan' is the official annual publication for Labasa College as it sums up the contrasting involvements of the school in retro.

== Notable alumni ==
- H.E. Amraiya Naidu – Former High Commissioner of Fiji to Australia
- Brij Lal – Professor of Pacific and Asian History, Australian National University
- Biman Prasad – Professor of Economics, University of the South Pacific
- Ajit Swaran Singh – first Fiji Indian to be appointed to the District Court in New Zealand
- Anjala Wati – High Court and Court of Appeal Judge of Fiji (2009–present)
- Ravinesh Deo – Professor of Mathematics (since 2020) at University of Southern Queensland and Highly Cited Researcher by the production of multiple highly cited papers that rank in top 1% by citations for field and year in the Web of Science™ (world's scientists and social scientists, are one in 1,000)
- Raveen Prakash Jaduram – Chief Executive, Watercare Services, Auckland, New Zealand
