= Fiji Girl Guides Association =

- Fiji Girl Guides Association
- Country: Fiji
- Founded: 1924
- Membership: 10,850
- Affiliation: World Association of Girl Guides and Girl Scouts

The Fiji Girl Guides Association is the national Guiding organization of Fiji. It serves 10,850 members (as of 2025). Founded in 1924, the girls-only organization became a full member of the World Association of Girl Guides and Girl Scouts in 1996.

== History ==
Guiding was introduced to Fiji in 1924 by a missionary in Levuka. Their first public appearance was in 1926, when the group participated in a parade in Suva for a royal visit, which resulted in a new group being formed in Suva as well. The Fiji Girl Guides Association formed in 1930, and as Fiji was a British colony at the time, it was registered as a branch of the UK Guide Association.

Activities were suspended from 1942 to 1945 as a result of World War II. The Association became independent in 1980, and it became an associate member of the World Association of Girl Guides and Girl Scouts the year after. In 1996, it became a full member. Membership was 7,632 in 1998, about 7,000 in 2017, and in 2025, it was reported to be 10,850.

The organization celebrated its 100th anniversary in 2024.

== Activities ==
Rangers, in the age range from 15 to 25, are often involved with projects that generate income, such as sewing or growing food. In urban areas, girls may learn office skills. Guides are also involved in activities to clean up and protect the environment. A national camp is held each year to teach both confidence and practical first aid and outdoors skills.

The Association is also involved in work against domestic violence and other social issues affecting women and girls in Fiji. It has held school programs for preventing and ending domestic violence with support from a United Nations program. The national camp gives the girls a space to talk about social issues affecting their lives and discuss sex education and sexual consent. During their 100th anniversary celebrations, the Association facilitated discussion among girls on social issues such as HIV, drug abuse, and teen pregnancy.

== See also ==
- Fiji Scouts Association
