= Action Libérale =

Political party in Mauritius

- Founded: 1907
- Ideology: Liberalism
- Political position: Left
- Colours: Red

The Action Libérale was a political party in Mauritius.

== History ==
In 1907 the Action Libérale was founded by Eugène Laurent, Edouard Nairac and Anatole de Boucherville.

== Objectives ==
The main objective of Action Libérale was to oppose the Oligarchy's Parti de L'Ordre which represented the conservative white Franco-Mauritian establishment led by Sir Henri Leclezio. It would also represent the rights of the coloured or Creole community.

Soon after its formation the trader Goolam Mamode Issac joined the newly formed Action Libérale, thus broadening the party's appeal to the larger Indo-Mauritian community.

== Electoral defeat ==
Action Libérale prepared for the 1911 general elections starting from 1907. However, only 2 of its candidates (Eugène Laurent and Edouard Nairac were elected. They defeated the oligarchs of Parti de L'Ordre Sir William Newton and Victor Ducasse in the Port Louis constituency. Overall the Parti de L'Ordre defeated Action Libérale with a score of 8 to 2. At Rivière du Rempart candidate René Mérandon of Action Libérale was defeated by Louis Souchon. In Curepipe Amand Esnouf defeated Anatole de Boucherville of Action Libérale. During a street procession to celebrate Esnouf's victory, violent clashes erupted when Eugène Laurent's coach cut in front of Esnouf's procession. Later that day rumours that Eugène Laurent had been assassinated led to the 1911 Curepipe riots.
