= James Arndell Youl =

Tasmanian colonist from New South Wales

Sir James Arndell Youl KCMG (1811–1904) was a Tasmanian colonist from New South Wales.

== Life ==
He was the eldest son of John Youl, and inherited Symmons Plains. He became a noted pastoralist, best known for introducing brown trout to Australia, and was created a Justice of the Peace in 1837.

Youl moved to England in 1854 with his wife Eliza (née Cox), where he lived in Clapham Park, Surrey. In 1861 he was appointed the unpaid official representative of Tasmania in London. He was a Commissioner for Australia at the 1862 International Exhibition. For many years he was honorary secretary and treasurer of the Australian Association and in 1868 he became a founding member and Vice President of the Colonial Society (now Royal Commonwealth Society). He became acting Agent General for Tasmania during 1888. He was made a Companion of the Order of St Michael and St George in the 1874 Birthday Honours and promoted to Knight in 1891.

Youl was a director of the Commercial Banking Company of Sydney for some years. He died in 1904, aged 95.

== See also ==
- John Youl
- Richard Youl
