= Indian Platoon =

Indo-Fijian military unit

The Indo-Fijian Platoon was the only Indo-Fijian military unit created in Fiji and existed from 1934 to 1941. The platoon was eventually disbanded following a dispute over pay.

== Creation of the platoon ==
In 1916, Manilal Doctor, the de facto leader of the Indo-Fijian tried to persuade the colonial government of Fiji to form an Indo-Fijian platoon to support the British war effort during the First World War. He sent the names of thirty-two volunteers to the government but his requests were ignored. A number of Indo-Fijian went to New Zealand to volunteer to join the New Zealand Army and one of these served in Europe.

According to historian, K.L. Gillion, the platoon was created within the Fiji Defence Force in 1934 as part of Governor Arthur Fletcher's policy of giving Indo-Fijians greater recognition and opportunity to participate in the general life of the Colony of Fiji and to encourage them to regard Fiji as their permanent home. The platoon was made up of ethnic Indians but the platoon commander and the non-commissioned officers were Europeans. The formation of the platoon was opposed by the two prominent European members of the Legislative Council, Sir Maynard Hedstrom and Sir Henry Scott.

According to John Dunham Kelly and Martha Kaplan, the platoon had been constituted to celebrate a Royal visit – "the Colonial Secretary had visions of a line of red turbans to complement the dramatic jagged-edged black-and-white uniforma of the Armed Native Constabulary". The turban never materialised but the commandant found the attachment of this unit to an otherwise European battalion, "awkward".

== Dispute over pay ==
Prior to the start of the Second World War, soldiers had served voluntarily and were paid "capitation grants" according to efficiency ratings without regard to race. On 8 September 1939, one week after the Nazi invasion of Poland, Fiji mobilised its Defence Force and changed its system of wages under which European privates were paid four shillings per day and non-European privates two shillings per day. The Indo-Fijian platoon members refused to accept their pay. The Commandant of the Fiji Defence Force asked for the every member of the platoon to be dismissed. The Governor refused to dismiss them and praised the European second lieutenant who persuaded them to accept non-European pay.

== Disbandment ==
The platoon was disbanded in 1940 and the reason given for this action during a war was shortage of equipment as explained by the Governor two years later: "military considerations at the time necessitated the disbandment of the Indian Platoon, which had given eight years of voluntary service in the Fiji Defence Forces. This disbandment was not due in any sense to unwillingness on the part of the Indo-Fijians to serve in the armed forces of the colony".

But the real reason for this action was that members of the platoon had asked for equal pay with the Europeans and the New Zealand military authorities (who commanded the Fiji Army at the start of the War) feared that this dissatisfaction could spread to the rest of the army, which was mainly ethnic Fijian.

According to Kelly, in November 1941, the soldiers of the platoon again asked to make a case for equal pay. Each member of the platoon was then separately asked to accept non-European pay, refused and was dismissed with the support of the new Governor.
