= 1874 Birthday Honours =

National awards given by Queen Victoria

The 1874 Birthday Honours were appointments by Queen Victoria to various orders and honours to reward and highlight good works by citizens of the British Empire. The appointments were made to celebrate the official birthday of the Queen and were published in The London Gazette in May and June 1874.

The recipients of honours are displayed here as they were styled before their new honour, and arranged by honour, with classes (Knight, Knight Grand Cross, etc.) and then divisions (Military, Civil, etc.) as appropriate.

== United Kingdom and British Empire ==
=== Duke and Earl ===
- His Royal Highness Prince Arthur William Patrick Albert KG KT KP as Earl of Sussex and Duke of Connaught and of Strathearn

=== The Most Honourable Order of the Bath ===
==== Companion of the Order of the Bath (CB) ====
===== Civil Division =====
- Robert Hawthorn Collins, Private Secretary to His Royal Highness the Prince Leopold

=== The Most Exalted Order of the Star of India ===
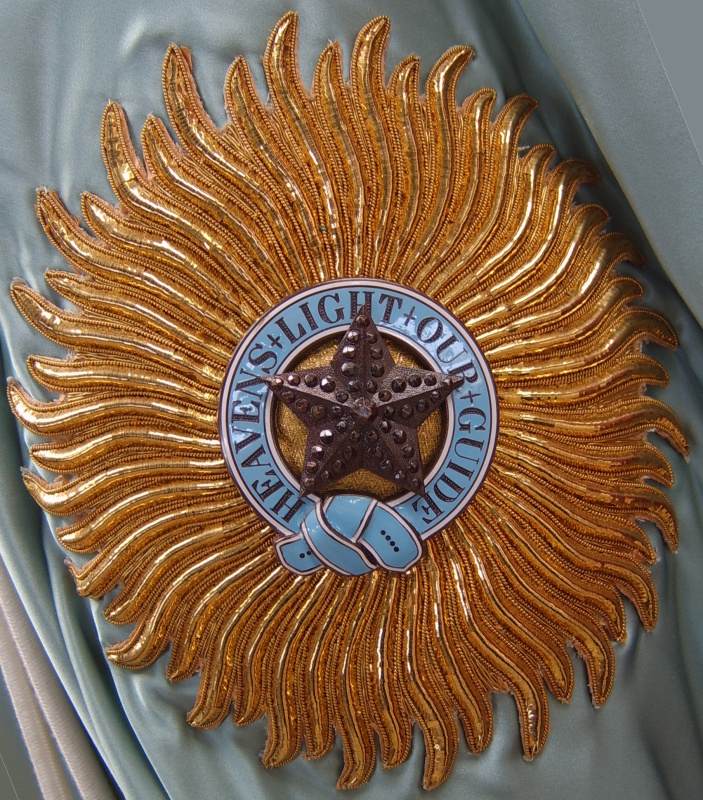
Star of a Knight Grand Commander of the Most Exalted Order of the Star of India

==== Knight Commander (KCSI) ====
- Robert Henry Davies CSI Bengal Civil Service, Lieutenant-Governor of the Punjab
- Colonel Richard John Meade CSI Bengal Staff Corps, Chief Commissioner of Mysore and Coorg
- Colonel Lewis Pelly CSI Bombay Staff Corps, Agent to the Governor-General for the States of Rajpootana, and late Political Resident in the Persian Gulf

==== Companion (CSI) ====
- The Honourable Ashley Eden, Bengal Civil Service, Chief Commissioner of British Burmah
- Rajah Ramanath Tagore, Member of the Council of the Governor-General of India, for making Laws and Regulations
- Vernon Hugh Schalch, Bengal Civil Service, Member of the Revenue Board, and of the Council of the Lieutenant-Governor of Bengal, for making Laws and Regulations

=== The Most Distinguished Order of Saint Michael and Saint George ===
Star of the Order of Saint Michael and Saint George

==== Knight Grand Cross of the Order of St Michael and St George (GCMG) ====
- John Hawley Glover, sometime Commander in Our Navy, and lately Our Special Commissioner to the Friendly Native Chiefs in the Eastern District of the Protected Territories near or adjacent to Our Settlements on the Gold Coast

==== Knight Commander of the Order of St Michael and St George (KCMG) ====
- Colonel Francis Worgan Festing CB lately in Command of Our Troops within Our Settlements on the Gold Coast
- Colonel Stephen John Hill CB Governor of the Colony of Newfoundland
- Colonel William Francis Drummond Jervois CB Royal Engineers, Deputy Director of Works for Fortifications, War Department
- Penrose Goodchild Julyan CB Crown-Agent for the Colonies

==== Companion of the Order of St Michael and St George (CMG) ====
- Colonel Robert William Harley CB late Administrator of Our Settlements on the Gold Coast
- Captain the Honourable Edmund Robert Fremantle RN CB lately in Command of Our Naval Forces on the Gold Coast
- Roger Tuckfield Goldsworthy, lately Our Deputy Commissioner and Second in Command under Commander John Hawley Glover at the Gold Coast
- Surgeon-Major Samuel Rowe, engaged on the West Coast of Africa since 1862, and as Medical Officer and Chief of the Staff with Commander John Hawley Glover during the late Ashantee War
- Captain Reginald William Sartorius, of the 6th Regiment of Bengal Cavalry, and lately serving against the Ashantees, under Commander John Hawley Grlover
- Lieutenant John Henry Barnard, of the 19th Regiment of Infantry, also lately serving against the Ashantees, under Commander John Hawley Glover
- Major William Augustus Tryden Helden, of the 100th Regiment of Infantry, lately selected for Special Service on the Gold Coast
- Deputy Commissary Henry Frederick Blissett, having charge of the Stores and Transport at the Gold Coast, under Commander John Hawley Glover
- Vice-Admiral Charles George Edward Patey, recently Governor and Commander-in-Chief of the Island of St. Helena
- James Arndell Youl, of the Colony of Tasmania
- Lieutenant-Colonel Henry Berkeley Fitzhardinge Maxse, Governor of the Island of Heligoland
- Giovanni Battista Trapani Collector of Land Revenue and Member of the Council of Government of the Island of Malta
- Gordon Gairdner, sometime Chief Clerk in the Colonial Office, and Secretary and Registrar of the Most Distinguished Order of Saint Michael and Saint George
- Sir George Barrow Bt lately Chief Clerk in the Colonial Office, and Secretary and Registrar of the Most Distinguished Order of Saint Michael and Saint George
- Virgile Naz, Member of the Council of Government of the Island of Mauritius
- Saul Samuel, Postmaster-General and Member of the Legislative Council of the Colony of New South Wales
