= Indian Imperial Association =

Organisation for Fijian Indian interests founded in 1911

The Indian Imperial Association of Fiji (I.I.A.) was active in Fiji during the last years of the indenture system, safeguarding the interests of and assisting in the improvement of the Indian community.

== Established as British Indian Association of Fiji ==
The original Association was established in 1911, following a severe hurricane that had brought much hardship to the Indians in the Central division, with the name British Indian Association of Fiji. It was formed by a group that included J.P. Maharaj (a Suva Storekeeper), Totaram Sanadhya (a pundit and social worker from Rewa), Ram Singh (a Suva printer) and Ram Rup. The meeting was chaired by Shriyut Rupram and discussed grievances such as the lack of educated leadership amongst the Indians and the dependence on European lawyers. Totaram Sanadhya was responsible for its Hindi language correspondence.

== Under the Leadership of Manilal Doctor ==
The Indian Imperial Association of Fiji (I.I.A.) came into existence in Fiji on 2 June 1918 after the arrival of Manilal Doctor, who asked for the original name of the association (British Indian Association of Fiji) to be changed because the name had the word "British" in it and Manilal, being a citizen of Baroda State, was not a British subject. Manilal became the President of the Indian Imperial Association of Fiji and Ram Singh its Secretary. The association contained mainly educated Fiji Indians. It sent petitions to the Government seeking review of marriage law, an end to the death penalty and representation into the Legislative Council. The aim of the association was to 'watch the interests of and to assist in the general improvement of the Indian community in Fiji'. As president of the I.I.A., Manilal Doctor wrote to Gandhi, other Indian leaders and the British Labour Party on the sad plight of Indian indentured labourers in Fiji. C.F. Andrews and W.W. Pearson were dispatched to Fiji to enquire into the complaints. Manilal Doctor made submissions for their report, published on 29 February 1916, which reported on the deplorable living conditions of the indentured labourers and their lack of access to education and medical facilities.

== Accomplishments ==
The case of Viraswamy is an example of the success of I.I.A. Viraswamy was an educated young man, who had been recruited in Madras on the understanding that he would be working on a post officer in the government office. When he arrived in Fiji in October 1911, he was sent to work with the Colonial Sugar Refining Company. He was initially employed as a telephone operator, but when he complained that he was not being given the promised job, he was sent to work in a cane field. He wrote to the I.I.A. and Manilal Doctor forwarded his case to the Anti-Slavery Society of London. The Society approached the Colonial Office and Veeraswamy was able to buy his freedom and get employment outside the indenture system.

After the appointment of Badri Maharaj as the nominated member representing Indians in the Legislative Council (Fiji), the I.I.A. took on the role of an opposition party because Badri Maharaj had little support amongst the Fiji Indians. The I.I.A. was allowed to present an address of welcome to Admiral Lord Jellicoe, on behalf of the Indian community, during his visit to Fiji in 1919.

On 26 December 1919, the Association organised a conference in the Suva Town Hall, which Manilal chaired and which passed a number of resolutions, including a call for independence for India, sympathy for the victims of the Jallianwala Bagh massacre and other resolutions relating to Fiji Indians. On 29 December 1919 the Association sent a list of request to the government which included the following:

1. Immediate cancellation of all remaining indenture agreements
2. Repeal of the Masters and servants ordinance
3. Improved educational facilities
4. Training of Indian medical officers like the Fijians
5. Permission to repatriate gold sovereigns
6. Establishment of sugar-cane board
7. Abolition of hut tax and hawkers licences
8. Agricultural training and financial help for Co-operative credit societies or agricultural banks
9. Better pay for skilled Indian workers such as locomotive drivers and those handling dangerous machinery
10. Worker's compensation
11. Better roads to Indian settlements
12. Easier acquisition of land without distinction of race
13. Better railway and steamship facilities
14. Amendment to municipal ordinances to enable most Indian ratepayers to vote
15. Amendment to all Fiji's ordinances to enable Indians to do most of the things permitted to Europeans only.

The Colonial Secretary, ignored the requests.

== The Demise of I.I.A. ==
Following, the strike of 1920, and after the Government decided to deport Manilal, the I.I.A. organised petitions in different languages, asking for him to be allowed to stay in Fiji. After Manilal was deported from Fiji in 1920, the I.I.A. collapsed. In the 1920s attempts were made to revive the I.I.A., having representatives from all sections of the Indian community, with Ilahi Ramjan as President, Ram Singh as Secretary and Deoki and Ram Samujh as vice-presidents. It made representations to the Secretary of State for the Colonies about residential tax and other issues, but the Government regarded it as representing only the urban educated Indians and refused to recognise it. It thus died a natural death, although attempts were made in later years to establish a similar association.

== See also ==
- Manilal Doctor
