= Richard Youl =

Surgeon and coroner in Tasmania, Australia (1821–1897)

Richard Youl (3 December 1821 – 6 August 1897) was an Australian coroner, surgeon, public servant and general practitioner. He was younger brother of James Arndell Youl. He grew up and was educated in England, graduating from the University of St Andrews, moving to Victoria when he returned to Australia. He was a noted medical practitioner, becoming in 1852 a founding member and secretary of the Victoria Medical Association. In 1853 he was appointed assistant surgeon to the Melbourne Gaols and a magistrate and district coroner for Bourke, New South Wales. During 1854 he was acting coroner for Melbourne, and from 1854 to 1867 he was visiting justice to penal establishments in Victoria. He became Melbourne Coroner permanently in 1857 and lost office in 1878 due to Premier Graham Berry's purge of civil servants claiming being unable to pay them. He regained office after the controversy calmed down. During his career he was reputed to have conducted over 12,000 inquests. He was a member of the Central Board of Health from 1855 until 1884 and its president during 1879–84. He was a member of the Medical Board of Victoria from 1858 and president from 1885 to 1897, Chairman of the Police Medical Board in 1892 and founded the Victorian Infant Asylum in 1877. He was said to have been quite liberal for his time, being opposed to the death penalty and the internment of juvenile offenders and the insane with normal criminals. He argued that prostitution should be legalised so it could be controlled safely. He died in 1897.

== See also ==
- John Youl
- Sir James Arndell Youl
- John Giles Price
- John Singleton
- Sir Graham Berry
