= Virgile Naz =

Mauritian lawyer, businessman and politician

Sir Virgile Naz KCMG

Member of Council of the Government of Mauritius
- In office 1881–1901

Personal details
- Born: 21 October 1825 Mahé, Seychelles
- Died: 3 August 1901 (aged 75) Mauritius
- Party: Reform Party (The Oligarchs)

Sir Virgile Naz (1825-1901) was a Mauritian lawyer, businessman and politician who was elected in British Mauritius to the Council of the Government of Mauritius, the predecessor of modern-day National Assembly or Parliament.

== Early life ==
Virgile Naz was born in the Seychelles to his mother Marie Joséphine Délande and father Jean Baptiste Naz in 1825. He grew up on the island of Mauritius and studied law.

== Career ==
Sir Virgile Naz practiced as a lawyer. He was elected as President of the Chamber of Agriculture of Mauritius over 4 terms (1865-1865, 1869-1869, 1877-1877 and 1881-1881).

Between 1882 and 1889 Sir Virgile Naz gathered support from the inhabitants of the village of Curepipe to create the Board des Commissaires de Curepipe with the goal of solving civil problems caused by the rapid development of the new village which had been founded in 1878. When the status of the village of Curepipe was changed to that of town Governor Sir Charles Lees named Sir Virgile Naz as the first President of the Board. The Board commissioned a network of 80 asphalted roads, built a bridge, drains, public gardens, nursery at Bois et Fôret, new Carnegie Library, a slaughter house, Cité Pitot and Salaffa Shopping Centre.

== Politics ==
Naz formed part of the pro-Hennessy Reform Party (also known as The Oligarchs) of Sir William Newton (Mauritius). Their main rivals formed part of the anti-Hennessy party Democrats which was led by Gustave de Coriolis and Onésipho Beaugeard. Virgile Naz was a member of the Council of the Government of Mauritius for a number of years.

Virgile Naz as well as Lois Raoul and William Newton are credited with being instrumental in ushering in the radical reforms which became known as the Constitutional Reform of 1885.

At the 1886 elections Naz was elected in the constituency of Souillac. It was following Sir Virgile Naz's recommendation that Governor John Pope Hennessy nominated Gnanadicarayen Arlanda as the first Indo-Mauritian to serve as member of the Legislative Council in 1886.

== Recognition ==
Virgile Naz was decorated as Companion of the Order of St Michael and St George (CMG) in 1874 in recognition for his contributions to Mauritian society. In 1880 he was further honored with the title Knight Commander of the Order of St Michael and St George (KCMG).

In the town of Rose Hill a street which connects Vandermeersch Street to Julius Nyerere Street is named after him. Another street in the capital city of Port Louis also bears his name, extending from Jules Koenig Street, through China Town to Sir Edgar Laurent Street in Plaine Verte.
