= Totaram Sanadhya =

Indian-Fijian writer (1876–1947)

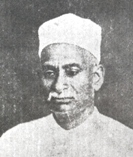
- Born: 1876; Hirangaon, North-Western Provinces, British Raj
- Died: 1947; Sabarmati Ashram, Gujarat, India
- Education: no formal education
- Occupation(s): Farmer, Priest

Totaram Sanadhya (1876–1947) was deceitfully recruited as an indentured labourer from India and brought to Fiji in 1893. He spent five years working as a bonded labourer but was never afraid to fight for his rights. After completing his indenture he established himself as a small farmer and a Hindu priest but spent most of his time trying to assist the less fortunate still under the bondage of indenture. He sought the help of Indian freedom fighters and missionaries and encouraged the migration to Fiji of Indian teachers and lawyers who, he believed, could improve the plight of Indians in Fiji. After living in Fiji for twenty-one years, he returned to India, in 1914, and wrote about his experience in the book "My Twenty-One Years in the Fiji Islands" (Hindi). This book was used as the main source of information in the campaign to end the Indian indenture system.

== Early life ==
Sanadhya was born in Hirangaon in the district of Firozabad, Uttar Pradesh, India in 1876. In 1887, his father died and soon his father's assets were taken over by unscrupulous money lenders. His elder brother left home to earn money to support his brothers and mother. The family lived in poverty and Sanadhya saw himself as a burden to his mother so in 1893 he left home to look for work.

One day he was recruited from the local market with the promise an easy job with good pay. He was told to lie to the magistrate who registered him as an indentured labourer. Although a Brahmin, Sanadhya was registered as a Thakur to increase his chances of being recruited. He was taken to a depot in Calcutta, where he changed his mind about going to Fiji but was locked up until he accepted his fate. Sanadhya, together with 500 others, arrived in Fiji on 28 May 1893 aboard the Jumna. At the quarantine station on Nukulau Island, he again protested about his treatment but was thrown into a boat and taken to the Colonial Sugar Refining Company's Nausori Plantation. Life on the plantation was tough for Sanadhya, who found that due to the hard work that he was doing, the weekly ration he was supplied with was exhausted in only four days. For the other three days he had to go hungry or ask free Indians for food. In his writings, he has not been ashamed to admit that he resorted to faking ill-health to avoid a full task and use his power of persuasion to get extra rations. Although he suffered abuse from overseers like the other labourers, he was not afraid to fight back and on at least one occasion assaulted an overseer.

== Life as a free man in Fiji ==
After five years of indenture, when Sanadhya became a free man, he did not have any money but owed fifteen shillings. He then borrowed some money, leased some land and became a cane farmer. Eager to improve his skills, Sanadhya learned the Fijian language, acquired carpentry and metalwork skills and took up photography. His intention was to take actual photographs of atrocities being suffered by Indians and have them published in a newspaper, but his camera was stolen while on a trip to Suva (the capital of Fiji), under suspicious circumstances, and his suspicion was confirmed when he was barred from meeting with indentured labourers in most estates.

Sanadhya knew that farming alone would not provide him with enough income, so he decided to become a pundit (priest). He could read and write in Hindi but needed religious books to educate himself. There were very few such books available in Fiji at that time and he arranged, with a European merchant, to import these books. As commission, he received a set of religious books from the merchant. He educated himself and started working as a pundit and very soon had a following in the Rewa area. Sanadhya was responsible for the first Ram Lila organised in Navua in 1902. When he had earned enough as a free person, he handed over the running of his farm to labourers and he toured the estates, trying to help the Indian labourers. He would sit outside the boundary of the estates singing religious songs and when people from the plantation came out to listen to him he would stop singing and discuss their problems.

== Political activities ==
In 1910, a petition asking for political representation and education, written by Sanadhya in Hindi, and signed by 200 Suva and Rewa Indians, was submitted to the Governor. In 1911, following a severe hurricane that had brought much hardship to the Fiji Indians in the Central Division of Fiji, the British Indian Association of Fiji was formed. The Association discussed grievances such as the lack of educated leadership amongst the Indians and the dependence on European lawyers and authorised Sanadhya to write a letter to Gandhi to send an Indian barrister to Fiji. Gandhi was moved by this appeal and published this request in the Indian Opinion, from where it came to the attention of Manilal Doctor in Mauritius. Manilal exchanged letters with Totaram Sanadhya, who organised for collection of money for Manilal's fare and law books and made arrangements for his stay in Fiji. In 1912 he sent a telegram to support Gokhale's resolution in the Legislative Council of India for an end to the Indenture system.

== Later life ==
He left for India on 27 March 1914. His departure from Fiji was a major event, even gaining the attention of the European Press. On his return to India, he toured different parts of India and also made a speech at the Madras session of the Indian National Congress. He published his experiences in Fiji in the book, My twenty-One Years in the Fiji Islands (in Hindi) in 1914. The book was banned in Fiji but received wide publicity in India and was published in several Indian languages and even a drama was based on it. Several stories in the book, especially Kunti's experiences, aroused a lot of passion and the call for an end to indenture. Sanadhya joined Mahatma Gandhi at the Sabarmati Ashram in 1922, with other followers of Gandhi. After a long illness, he died in 1947.

== See also ==
- Hermann Kallenbach
- Sarvodaya

== Bibliography ==
- Sanadhya, Totaram (1991). My Twenty-One Years in the Fiji Islands. Translated by J.D. Kelly; U.K. Singh. Suva, Fiji: Fiji Museum. ISBN 982-208-003-4.
