= Lalu =

Lalu may refer to:

== People ==
- Lalu Muhammad Zohri, an Indonesian sprinter
- Lalu Muhamad Iqbal, Indonesian politician
- Lalu Prasad Yadav, an Indian politician
- Shahidul Islam (Lalu), Bangladeshi 1971 Liberation War veteran and a Bir Protik
- Polly Bemis, born Lalu Nathoy, a Chinese American pioneer woman
- Vivien Lalu (also known as Lalu), a French metal keyboardist, composer and producer

== Others ==
- Lalu, Nepal
- Lalu (ละลุ), natural rock formations caused by erosion in Sa Kaeo Province, Thailand
