= Brij Lal =

Fijian politician

Brij Lal is a Fijian politician and Member of the Parliament of Fiji. He is of Indian descent.

Lal was educated at Labasa College. He later went on to achieve a Teaching certificate from the National Teachers College. He did his Bachelor of Arts at the University of the South Pacific as well as his Postgraduate diploma. He got his Master's of science from the Royal Ireland Institute of Business and Technology.

He taught in multiple schools in Labasa after graduating. He was made an Education Officer for the Macuata/Bua region and later a Senior Education Officer. He served the Cakaudrove District as well as Lautoka. He also served as Program's Manager on the AusAid funded Fiji Education Sector Program.

While rising through the ranks, he collected many medals including Long Service Commendation Award, Medal of Merit, Universal Bridge Gold Medal and the Civil Service Medal. He was also the Deputy Chief Commissioner of the Fiji Scouts Association.

In June 2010, he was appointed the Permanent Secretary for Education, National Heritage, Culture & Arts, Youth & Sports after the former secretary, Filipe Jitoko resigned.

He stood for Fiji First in the 2014 general elections. He collected 2700 votes and was elected as a Member of Parliament.
