= Girmitiyas =

Indentured laborers from British India

Girmitiyas, (Bhojpuri: 𑂏𑂱𑂩𑂧𑂱𑂗𑂱𑂨𑂰, IPA: [ɡɪɾmɪʈɪjaː]) also known as Jahazis (Hindustani: जहाज़ी, IPA: [dʒəɦaːziː]) or Jahajis (IPA: [dʒəɦaːdʒiː]), were indentured labourers from British India transported to work on plantations in Fiji, South Africa, Mauritius, and the Caribbean (namely Trinidad and Tobago, British Guiana, Suriname and Jamaica) as part of the Indian indenture system.

== Etymology ==
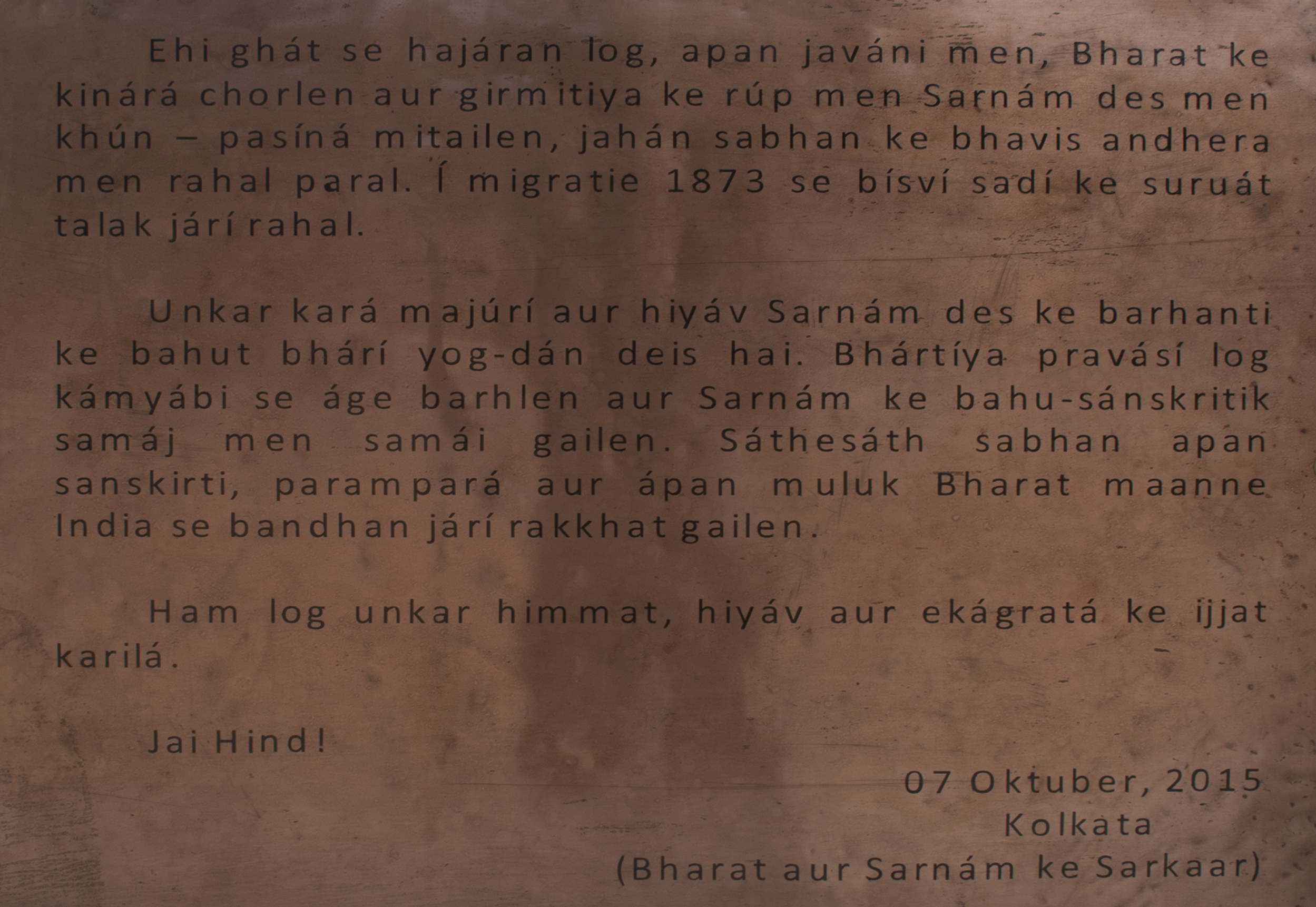
Sarnami Hindustani (Roman script) plaque at Suriname Memorial, Garden Reach, Kolkata, West Bengal, India

The word girmit represented an Indian pronunciation of the English word "agreement" - from the indenture "agreement" of the British Government with labourers from the Indian subcontinent. The agreements specified the workers' length of stay in foreign parts and the conditions attached to their return to British India. In Indic (Indo-Aryan) languages such as Hindustani, the word Jahāz (जहाज़), which is sometimes pronounced as Jahāj in certain languages such as Bhojpuri, means 'ship' (from the Arabic/Persian Jahāz/ جهاز), with Jahazi implying 'people of ship' or 'people coming via ship'. These Indian-origin labourers referred to one another as जहाज़ी भाई jahāzī bhai (ship brother) or जहाज़ी बेहेन jahāzī behen (ship sister), reflecting the brotherly and sisterly bonds made on their voyage from India to the West.

Many Girmitiyas—indentured labourers taken from British India came from marginalised and lower-caste backgrounds, including a significant number from the Chamar caste. Facing entrenched discrimination, poverty, and limited opportunities in India, they were often drawn by misleading promises of better livelihoods abroad. As a result, they formed an important yet frequently overlooked segment of the indentured workforce in regions such as Fiji, Mauritius, and the Caribbean.

In Fiji, Governor Arthur Hamilton-Gordon discouraged Melanesian Fijians from working on the plantations in an attempt to preserve their culture. Activist Shaneel Lal argues that Girmitiya were deceitfully enslaved by the British.

== See also ==
- Coolie
- Indian indenture system
- Indo-Caribbean people
- Indo-Fijians
- Fiji Hindi
- Caribbean Hindustani
- Global Girmit Museum
- Indian Caribbean Museum of Trinidad and Tobago
- Lalla Rookh Museum
