= Constitution of Mauritius (1885) =

Supreme law of the colony of Mauritius

The British colony of Mauritius received a new constitution by letters patent on 16 September 1885. It established a Council of Government of 27 members: eight ex officio members, nine appointed by the governor (at least three of which could not be officials), and ten elected (one per district, but two from Port Louis). The franchise was restricted to men, and there were property and education qualifications designed to exclude the vast majority of Indians.

Prior to 1885, the Mauritian council comprised the governor and eight other officials ex officio and eight councilors nominated by the governor. The initiative in changing the constitution lay with Laurent Loïs Raoul, who organized a town hall meeting of the French planter class in Port Louis on 30 June 1882. A committee was set up two weeks later, and on 4 October it presented a petition to secure the addition of elected members to the governing council. On 31 October 1882, Lieutenant-Governor F. N. Broome forwarded the petition to the colonial secretary, the Earl of Kimberley. Broome advised Kimberley against the proposal, saying: "It must shut out the Indian and the descendant of the old slave population, and so place the power in the hands of an oligarchy of the upper classes ... or it must place power in the hands of the ignorant mass of people not fitted to exercise it."

The governor at the time, John Pope Hennessy, was an Irish home ruler who advocated a "Mauritius for the Mauritians", emphasising the rights of the Indians and the Creoles. The result was a relatively liberal constitution for a colony. Kimberley's successor, the Earl of Derby, insisted on allowing Indians to take the education test in their native languages and on lowering the property qualification. Despite this, in the elections of 1886 there were only 4,061 registered voters, including only 295 of Asian origin, out of a population of 359,419 (per the 1881 census). A prospective voter had to meet one of six property qualifications:

1. Ownership of immovable property of annual value Rs300
2. Ownership of movable property of Rs3,000
3. Payment of a monthly rent of at least Rs25
4. Drawing a monthly salary of at least Rs50
5. Paying an annual licence duty of at least Rs200
6. Being husband of a wife or eldest son of a widow who meets one of qualifications #1–3

In 1889, Pope Hennessy in a letter to the colonial office, remarked that "no one in this Country doubts that the former Constitution was a better one than the present Government by an oligarchy of 4,201 voters." The 1885 constitution replaced the constitution of 1831 remained in force until 1948, when the constitution of 1947 came into effect. The 1885 constitution was amended on 11 September 1913 and again on 18 April 1933. The latter amendment increased the proportion of appointed councilors who had to be non-officials from one third to two thirds (from three to six).
