= Eugène Laurent =

Mauritian politician

Leader of Action Libérale
- In office 1911–1907

Elected Mayor of Port Louis
- In office 1905–1919

Personal details
- Born: Eugène Laurent; 1850 British Mauritius
- Died: 1926 (aged 75–76) London, United Kingdom
- Citizenship: British Mauritius
- Party: Action Libérale

Eugène Laurent (1850-1926) was a former mayor of Port Louis and one of the founders of the political party Action Libérale in Mauritius in 1907.

== Early life ==
Eugène Laurent was born in a Creole family on the island of Mauritius. He completed his secondary education at Royal College Curepipe and travelled to England to study medicine.

== Political career ==
Laurent was repeatedly elected as Mayor of Port Louis from 1905 to 1919.

In 1907, Laurent formed the new political party Action Libérale in collaboration with white Franco-Mauritians Anatole de Boucherville and Edouard Nairac in order to fight against the conservative white establishment led by Sir Henri Leclezio of the Oligarchy's Parti de L'Ordre, and to represent the rights of the Creole community.

Following his party's defeat at the 1911 general elections, Laurent migrated to London, England in 1919 where he died in 1926.

== Legacy ==
In the city of Port Louis a major street is named after Laurent.

== See also ==
- Maurice Curé
