= Pancham Lal =

Indian politician

Pancham Lal (born 1951) is a retired Indian Administrative Service cadre. Lal held the post of Principal Secretary (Parliamentary Affairs), in rank of Chief Secretary, in Bihar. During his administrative career, he faced opposition from several different Chief Ministers as he criticised corruption and criminal links of state ministers.

Lal hails from Uttar Pradesh and was a 1974 batch IAS officer.

In 2002, then the Commission in Saran division of Bihar, Lal was removed from his post after having labelled Indian politicians as "looters and a pack of liars" at a public function. The affair became front-page news in local newspapers in Bihar. According to Lal he had been provoked by politicians using a government function to make political speeches. In the midst of the controversy, Lok Janshakti Party leader Ram Vilas Paswan expressed support for Lal.

In 2006 he alleged that two Bihar state legislators stormed his office and threatened to kill him unless he restored a motor vehicles inspector he had suspended. At the time Lal worked as Transport Commissioner.

Lal retired from IAS on 31 August 2011.

He caused controversy when stating that 90% of cases against Naxalites were false. In a statement following his retirement, Lal rebutted claims of development under Nitish Kumar's government in Bihar. He argued that "[t]he present bureaucracy in Bihar is the most corrupt one in the history of the state [...] Dalits have been the worst victim of the might of the state during the NDA rule and the people from downtrodden sections have been killed by the police in fake encounters or by painting them as the Maoists".

Ahead of the 2014 Lok Sabha election, he was mentioned as a potential Bharatiya Janata Party candidate in the Sasaram seat. In the end, he sided with the All India Forward Bloc and was declared as the candidate for the party in the Pataliputra seat on 18 March 2014. Commenting on his candidature, Lal stated that his foremost objective was not to win the Lok Sabha seat but "to raise the cause of the oppressed and weaker sections, who are exploited and victimized".
