= William Newton (Mauritian politician) =

Mauritian lawyer and politician (March 14 1842 – June 15 1915)

Sir William Newton KCMG

Member of Council of the Government of Mauritius
- In office 1884–1889

Member of the Executive Council of Government
- In office 1906–1911

Founder and Leader of Reform Party
- In office 1885–1915

Personal details
- Born: 14 March 1842 Port Louis, Mauritius
- Died: 15 June 1915 (aged 73) Mauritius
- Party: Reform Party (The Oligarchs)

Sir William Newton (March 14 1842 - June 15 1915) was a Mauritian lawyer and politician who was elected in British Mauritius to the Council of the Government of Mauritius, the predecessor of modern-day National Assembly or Parliament.

== Early life ==
William Newton was born in British Mauritius on 14 March 1842. Newton belonged to the Mulatto or Gens de couleur community, also known nowadays as Population Générale given that his mother was Indo Mauritian and his father had migrated from Scotland. He grew up on the island of Mauritius and completed his secondary education at the Royal College Curepipe where he was a "Laureate". He was thus granted a British scholarship for further studies, and he travelled to England where he studied law.

== Legal career ==
William Newton practiced as a barrister in Mauritius. In 1882 he was appointed as Legal Counsel of the Chamber of Agriculture of Mauritius. In 1891 he was appointed to the Queen's Council.

== Political career ==
Soon after his arrival in Mauritius from Hong Kong in 1883 Governor John Pope Hennessy launched a new project for the adoption of a revised Constitution which was well supported by the Mauritian barrister William Newton. Irishman and Catholic Pope Hennessy's proposed new Constitution expanded the right to vote to a wider section of the Mauritian society and would allow wealthy Indo-Mauritians to vote for the first time in the island's history. John Pope Hennessy received the support of the new movement called Reform Party which had been formed by William Newton and Virgile Naz. It also became known as The Oligarchs and Les Réformistes. Mauritian politicians Lois Raoul and Henri Leclézio also joined Newton's new party which campaigned for the new Constitution. There was strong opposition to changes by the conservative Anti-Reformists led by Sir Célicourt Antelme, as well as the Democrats party, led by Gustave de Coriolis and Onésipho Beaugeard. Newton argued against Anti-Reformist Antelme’s recurrent argument of "The Asiatic spectre” and "Indian Peril", explaining that the rising influence of the Indo-Mauritian mass would not be curtailed by outdated legislation, and that instead the Constitution had to be modified to suit modern society's needs.

In 1884 William Newton became a Nominated Member of the Council of the Government of Mauritius, which allowed him to play an active role in reforming the political system via a new Constitution. On 20 October 1885 the new Constitution enabled the introduction of elected members in the local legislature. Although the new 1885 Constitution did not provide as wide a franchise as that provided in the 1948 elections or by the universal suffrage of 1959, it was considered a breakthrough as Indo-Mauritians and non-Whites were allowed to elect their representatives for the first time in history. The new system restricted the right to vote to only men who owned immovable property of an annual value of ₨ 300, or owned movable property worth more than ₨ 3000, or was husband of a wife or the eldest son of a widow possessing such qualifications, or earned a monthly salary of ₨ 50. Out of the island's 360,000 citizens only 4000 men had the right to vote.

When a Royal Commission of Enquiry was set up in 1886 to investigate allegations against Governor Pope Hennessy of excessive involvement in local politics and his role in the collapse of The Old (Oriental) Bank, Pope Hennessy was briefly suspended from office. In protest William Newton's Reform Party raised a petition which was signed by 6,800 citizens. William Newton was also chosen as Pope Hennessy's defence attorney in London where he successfully defended the Governor who was reinstated on 12 July 1886. Pope Hennessy remained in office until 11 December 1889.

In 1889 William Newton was elected member of the Council of Port Louis. He also served a President of the Royal Society of Arts and Sciences. When he visited England in 1887 he successfully lobbied the Secretary of State for the creation of a research station in agriculture in Mauritius. During the 1909 Royal Commission William Newton represented the planters' interests and also lobbied for the creation of an Agricultural Bank to provide loans to planters at preferential interest rates.

From 1906 to 1911 William Newton was an unofficial member of the Executive Council of Government.

== Recognition ==
In December 1905 he was knighted by the King of the United Kingdom in recognition of the services that he had rendered to the colony.

Sir William Newton was described as the greatest Coloured man in Mauritius thanks to his campaign for representative government and revised Constitution which enabled greater participation of the Gens de Couleur (Creoles) in political life following the 1886 General Elections.

In the city of Port Louis a street which connects Sir Robert Townsend Farquhar Street to Dauphine Street is named after him. Sir William Newton's statue has also been erected in front of the Government House in Place D'Armes, and next to Sir John Pope Hennessy's statue.
