= Fiji Scouts Association =

National Scouting organization of Fiji

- Nai Soqosoqo ni taba Gone e Viti
- Country: Fiji
- Membership: 3,926
- President: Sanjeev Pal
- Chief Commissioner: Chandra Shekhar
- Affiliation: World Organization of the Scout Movement

The Fiji Scouts Association (Fijian: Nai Soqosoqo ni taba Gone e Viti) is the national Scouting organization of Fiji. Scouting in Fiji was founded in 1914, and became a member of the World Organization of the Scout Movement in 1971. The Fiji Scouts Association has 3,926 members as of 2011.

Scouts are involved in numerous community service projects which assist the government. These include conservation of nature, disaster relief and various other forms of work in the community. After one hurricane, Scouts provided assistance by packing and distributing relief supplies. Scouting is a required part of the curriculum in public schools in Fiji.

== See also ==
- Fiji Girl Guides Association
