= Padma Narsey Lal =

Fijian ecological economist

Padma Narsey Lal (born 1951) is a Fijian ecological economist. She specialises in ecosystem based disaster risk reduction and climate change adaptation.

== Life ==
Lal studied at the University of the South Pacific, graduating with a master's degree in science, ecology and biochemistry. She was the first female Gujarati to attend the university. In 1971, she was awarded the first University of the South Pacific Gold Medal. She also completed a masters in resource and environmental studies from Australian National University and a doctorate in agriculture and resource economics from University of Hawaii at Manoa.

Lal began her career as a public servant for the Fijian government before moving into research and research management positions. She has served as Sustainable Development Adviser at Pacific Islands Forum Secretariat, and as Chief Technical Adviser at International Union for Conservation of Nature Oceanic Regional Office. Lal has also held senior positions with the Australian Commonwealth Government, including with the Australian Centre for International Agricultural Research.

=== Publications ===
- Conservation or conversion of mangroves in Fiji : an ecological economic analysis (1990) Environment and Policy Institute, East-West Center
- Ecological economic analysis of mangrove conservation: a case study from Fiji (1990) UNESCO
- Ganna: portrait of the Fiji sugar industry (2008) Sugar Commission of Fiji
