= Manilal Doctor =

British Indian barrister and politician

Manilal Maganlal Doctor
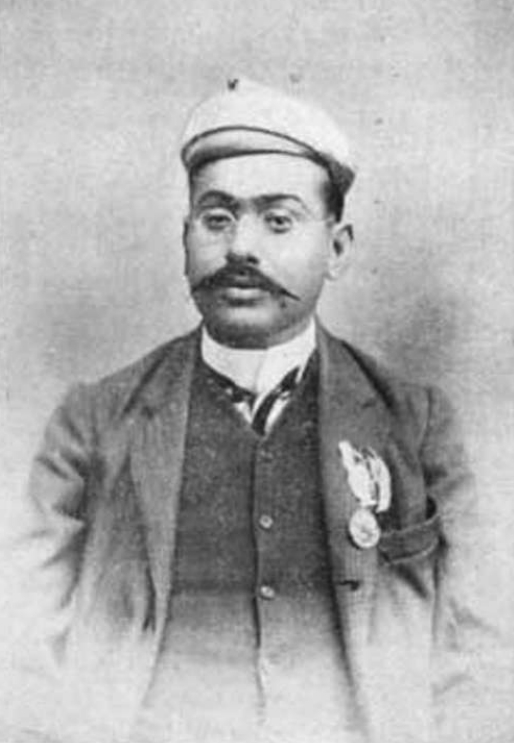
- c. 1911
- Born: 28 July 1881; Baroda, Gujarat, British India
- Died: 8 January 1956 (aged 74); Bombay, India
- Education: MA, LLB
- Occupation: Lawyer
- Spouse: Jayakumari Devi
- Children: Sons: Madhusudha, Lalitmohan, Indubhushan Daughter: Avanidevi

Manilal Maganlal Doctor (28 July 1881 – 8 January 1956) was a British Indian barrister and politician, who travelled to numerous countries of the British Empire, including Fiji, Mauritius and Aden, providing legal assistance to the local ethnic Indian population. He met Gandhi, who asked him to go to Mauritius, where he represented Indo-Mauritians in court and edited a newspaper, The Hindustani. Gandhi later informed him of the need for a barrister in Fiji and he arrived in Fiji in 1912. In Fiji he also represented Indo-Fijians in court, started a newspaper, Indian Settler and established an organisation for Fiji Indians, known as the Indian Imperial Association. In 1916 when he was by-passed for nomination to the Legislative Council of Fiji, his relationship with the Government of Fiji deteriorated. The Government accused him of the violence and sabotage of the 1920 strike and deported him. He was barred from practicing law in several British colonies. He later managed to practice law in Aden, Somalia and Bihar State in India but spent his final days in Bombay.

== Early life ==
Manilal Maganlal Doctor was born on 28 July 1881 in Baroda, Gujarat, India. His surname, Doctor, was derived from his father's profession. His father, Maganlal, was in-charge of the State Mental Hospital. His real name was Manilal Maganlal Shah. Manilal graduated with LLB in 1903 and MA in 1904 from Bombay University. He then went to London as a student of Bar-at-Law in 1905. In London he became an active member of the Home Rule Society and made regular contributions to the 'Indian Sociologist'. At the India House he came into contact with other Indian freedom fighters. In 1906, Manilal met Mahatma Gandhi, who had become aware of the plight of the Indians in Mauritius. Gandhi was troubled by both the treatment of the Indian labourers and their lack of organisation in demanding their rights as citizens of the British Empire. In response to his visit, he sent Manilal Doctor to Mauritius to assist the labourers in improving their social and political situation.

== Manilal in Mauritius ==
Manilal arrived in Mauritius on 11 October 1907 and began work as a barrister. 11 October is celebrated as Manilal Day in Mauritius. He soon clashed with the Judge of the Supreme Court when he refused to remove his shoes and turban (Manilal wore a Parsi-style head-dress) on entering the court, pointing out that these were allowed in the high courts of Bombay and Madras. The matter was taken before the Governor who issued an order allowing shoes and turbans in the courts of Mauritius. Indians in Mauritius used to be treated with severity, by always being given the maximum punishment for any crime, while Europeans were given nominal punishment or only fined for serious offences. Manilal pleaded for balance between crime and punishment. For the first time, Indo-Mauritians found a lawyer they could rely on and he was soon accepted as their leader. In a case involving indentured Indians on the Labourdonnais estate, the Indian workers sought out Manilal to come with them to the Office of the Protector in Port Louis. Then, when the case came to trial, Manilal represented the four Indians charged with wounding with premonition. Of the four laborers accused, three were found guilty and sentenced to two years' of hard labor. Given the nature of Mauritius justice at that time, "it seems certain that if they had not been properly represented at the trial there would have been a larger number found guilty, and perhaps longer sentences."

He left Mauritius for Bombay on 28 November 1910 to attend the annual Indian National Congress Meeting.

=== Newspaper launched ===
On 15 March, Manilal launched a weekly newspaper,The Hindustani, with the motto: "Liberty of Individuals! Fraternity of Men!! Equality of races!!!." It was first published in English and Gujarati, but the Gujarati was soon replaced with Hindi to appeal to the masses. With this newspaper he wanted to highlight the importance of the Indians shared heritage and common interests, regardless of religion or status as merchant or laborer. The newspaper was fined on a number of occasions for its editorial and reporting of court cases but continued to be published even after Manilal's departure. Manilal tried to arouse worldwide sympathy towards the suffering of the Indo-Mauritians by writing regularly to overseas newspapers. After Manilal left Mauritius, much of his work was undertaken by Pandit Kashinath Kistoe and the Arya Samaj.

=== Marriage ===
Sometime in 1911, Manilal traveled to London where he spent considerable time with Dr. Pranjivan Mehta, a close friend of Gandhi. There, he formed an attachment to Dr. Mehta's daughter, Jayunkvar, and became engaged. It is likely that Manilal briefly traveled back to Mauritius to close his affairs before going on to Durban South Africa to consult with Gandhi.

On 11 October 1911, a few weeks after his arrival in Durban, he married Jayakumari Devi (Jekiben). Gandhi encouraged him to practice law in South Africa, but Manilal wanted to take part in the debate of Congress calling for the abolition of Indenture. He attended the 26th Annual Session of the Congress and seconded the motion calling for an end to Indenture.

== Manilal in Fiji ==
In 1911, following a severe hurricane that had brought much hardship to the Fiji Indians in the Central Division of Fiji, the British Indian Association of Fiji was formed. The Association discussed grievances such as the lack of educated leadership amongst the Indians and the dependence on European lawyers and authorised Totaram Sanadhya to write a letter to Gandhi to send an Indian barrister to Fiji. Gandhi was moved by this appeal and published this request in the Indian Opinion from where it came to the attention of Manilal in Mauritius. Manilal exchanged letters with Totaram Sanadhya, who organised for collection of money for Manilal's fare and law books and made arrangements for his stay in Fiji. Manilal met Gandhi in Durban, but Gandhi despite his initial reluctance agreed to release Manilal.

Manilal arrived in Suva on 27 August 1912. He was welcomed by hundreds of people, some of whom had journeyed long distances. Newspaper reporters also joined the throng as this was a joyous occasion for Fiji Indians. Manilal was presented with a welcoming letter in which he was also implored to improve the conditions of the Indians. The native Fijians also welcomed Manilal in a ceremony held three days later, and attended by some 700 Fijians. Fijian men and women sang and danced to welcome him and he was garlanded by the daughter of a high chief. The Fijians made speeches and it was translated by Sam Mustapha from Fijian into English

Manilal set up a law practice, defended Indians for low fees and wrote letters and petitions for them. The Government was suspicious of him and suspected him of being Gandhi's agent in Fiji but still consulted him on Indian affairs. Initially, Manilal worked quietly to help the Indians and the case of Viraswamy is an example of the success he had in Fiji. Viraswamy was an educated young man, who had been recruited in Madras on the understanding that he would be working on a post officer in the government office. When he arrived in Fiji in October 1911, he was sent to work with the CSR. He was initially employed as a telephone operator, but when he complained that he was not being given the promised job, he was sent to work in a cane field. He wrote to the I.I.A. and Manilal forwarded his case to the Anti-Slavery Society of London. The Society approached the Colonial Office and Veeraswamy was able to buy his freedom and get employment outside the indenture system. The government, instead of chastising the CSR and the immigration office, expressed annoyance with Manilal.

=== Political activities ===
In 1915, a number of Indians petitioned the Governor to nominate Manilal as their representative in the legislative council. The Governor replied that Indian interests were adequately catered for but he was prepared to grant the request if an Indian with the required qualification could be found and the Government of India supported the demand. On the basis of India's recommendation, the Governor, in 1916, nominated Badri Maharaj to represent Indians in the Legislative Council. This nomination was not popular with Fiji Indians and petitions were sent from throughout the colony asking the Government to reconsider its choice. Even the Fiji Times regarded Manilal as a better person for the Council than Badri Maharaj. The Government ignored these protests claiming that Manilal was not eligible for nomination as he was born in Baroda and not a British subject.

=== Indian Imperial Association ===
He was a regular contributor to the press in India on matters regarding Fiji and, in 1917, was the editor of the English section of the first newspaper published in Fiji by Indians, Indian Settler. On 2 June 1918, he was instrumental in the formation of the Indian Imperial Association (I.I.A.) of Fiji (a successor to the British Indian Association) in Suva. The aim of the association was to 'watch the interests of and to assist in the general improvement of the Indian community in Fiji'. As president of the I.I.A., Manilal wrote to Gandhi, other Indian leaders and the British Labour Party on the sad plight of Indian indentured labourers in Fiji. C.F. Andrews and W.W. Pearson were dispatched to Fiji to enquire into the complaints. Manilal made submissions for their report, published on 29 February 1916, which reported on the deplorable living conditions of the indentured labourers and their lack of access to education and medical facilities.

Manilal was free thinker but generally had socialist views. He was not religious but believed that Arya Samaj was the best sect for the casteless Indian society that was developing in Fiji. He believed in the advancement of his community and when some Europeans suggested a federation of Fiji and New Zealand, Manilal, through the Indian Imperial Association circulated a petition for Fiji to become part of India since the country's future depended on its Indian population.

The relationship between Manilal and the government worsened when he tried to apply for Fijian land to build an office in Nausori. His application was refused but he made an agreement with the Fijian owners and started to build. He was ordered to leave and when he did not comply, was fined 10 pounds. Manilal was bitter about the incident and on 24 September 1919 the Indian Imperial Association passed a resolution condemning the government for not allowing him to build when Europeans themselves had acquired land by illegal means. He also sent a telegram regarding this incident to Andrews, who had it published in the Indian press. On 26 December 1919, the Association organised a conference in the Suva Town Hall, which Manilal chaired and which passed a number of resolutions, including a call for independence for India, sympathy for the victims of the Punjab massacre and other resolutions relating to Fiji Indians.

=== Strike of 1920 ===
On 15 January 1920 Indian labourers employed by the Public Works Department in Suva went on strike because their hours of work had been increased from 45 to 48 hours per week and they wanted better wages. Manilal reassured those workers who had been threatened by their employers and pacified others who wanted to teach saboteurs a lesson. He held meetings in Suva and Nausori in which the strikers reiterated their demand of rise in wages by 5 shillings. The meetings were so peaceful that the Inspector General of Constabulary sent a message to Manilal, thanking him and expressing his appreciation at the quiet and orderly way in which the meeting of the strikers had been conducted.

Jayunkvar, Manilal's wife, was also active in the strike, exhorting Indians not to return to work and organizing Indian women. After a meeting in Suva organised by Jayunkvar was violently broken up by the police, the situation got worse. By 11 February all Europeans of military age were under arms. The telephone wires between Suva and Nausori was cut and there was a confrontation on Rewa Bridge between Indians and European special constables with fixed bayonets. On 12 February a New Zealand force of 60 soldiers with machine guns arrived and a warship arrived from England. On 13 February, the police and army held up a group of Indians at Samabula Bridge. The Indians wanted to go to Suva to buy supplies and see those in custody. When the Indians did not obey the order to disperse, the police charged with batons. There was resistance from the Indians using sticks and stones and the police fired into the crowd. A number were injured on both sides but three Indians were hit by pistol fire of which one died.

After the incident at Samabula Bridge, the strikers gradually began returning to work. Historians have argued as to the reasons for the end of the strike. It was most probably a combination of reasons which included the presence of large numbers of armed security personnel and the Governments willingness to use lethal force, an earlier call by Mrs Manilal for those workers who had received wage increase to return to work, the labourers inability to stay away from paid employment for a long period because of their already poor financial situation and the warning by Badri Maharaj to the strikers (at a meeting in Nausori on 15 February) of the danger of being led by agitators.

=== Deportation from Fiji ===
Although Manilal had not been in Suva when the strike began and the Government did not have sufficient evidence to charge him for sedition, it used the Peace and Good Order Ordinance of 1875 to prohibit him, his wife and two other strike leaders, Harpal Maharaj and Fazil Khan from residing on Viti Levu, Ovalau or Macuata province. Since these were the main areas of Indian settlement and the only places where Indians could earn a living, this virtually amounted to deportation. Manilal was sent to Nukulau Island to await a ship to New Zealand. From Nukulau, Manilal sent a number of letters of complaint to the Secretary of State for the Colonies and he signed one with 'from Imperial University, Coolie Examination Hall, Nukulau". Petitions were organised, signed by thousands of Indians, asking for Manilal not to be expelled as he was their leader and that they could not continue to stay if Manilal was expelled.

Manilal left Fiji on 15 April 1920. The Colonial Government continued to harass Manilal after his departure from Fiji. He was not allowed to practice law in New Zealand. Manilal's application for admission as a barrister and solicitor in New Zealand was refused by a Full Court of the Supreme Court in 1921. The Auckland District Law Society opposed his application on the basis that he was not of fit character given his role as a "prime mover" in the 1920 strike. The Court did not accept Manilal's explanation and instead favoured the evidence of the Colonial authorities (including Mr Scott a member of the Legislative Council and also the lawyer for the Crown in the prosecution of the 200 striking workers) that Manilal was "principally the cause of the said Indian disturbance". His correspondence was monitored. C.F. Andrews informed Gandhi that a paper that Manilal had sent to him from New Zealand had 4 or 5 sections cut out (presumably containing information about Fiji). He had already been refused permission to practice in Australia and was refused permission to practice in Ceylon (Sri Lanka) and even in India he was not allowed to practice in the Bombay and Madras High Courts. The British Government even had his name struck off the list of Barristers. Gandhi noted that "An empire that requires such calculated persecution of a man, without even ntrying to prove anything against him, deserves only to be dissolved." He was finally given permission by the Patna High Court to practice in the Lower Courts of Bihar and Orissa because he held an LLB degree from an Indian University. After much wandering he set up a legal practice in Gaya, Bihar in 1922.

== Final years ==
Manilal soon became a regular contributor to the Socialist, an English periodical in Bombay. He was soon involved in Socialist activities and came into contact with Communists who were trying to get organised in India. M.N. Roy's idea of a party for the masses appealed to Manilal but he was opposed to the idea of infiltrating the Congress. He attended the Gaya Congress in 1923 and soon after issued a manifesto of the Labour and Kisan Party of India. This was soon used as model by the Communists, with whom Manilal was associated. Not surprisingly, he came to the attention of the authorities and spent some time defending others who shared his own left-leaning ideas. He was not happy with rivalries among Indian leaders and kept looking for outside openings. He tried to settle in Penang (Malaysia) but was warned by the Colonial Secretary for Singapore that he would be prevented from landing there. His dream of having a life of professional barrister was realised when the Chief Justice of Aden (with whom he had studied in London) asked him to come and practice there after assuring colonial authorities that he would not be a problem there as there was no indenture system in Aden.

He continued to provide service to the people of Aden and Somaliland (1935–1940) but the revolutionary and radical zeal seemed to have left him. He visited Mauritius in 1950 where he was enthusiastically welcomed. In 1953 he returned to India (from Aden) and lived in Bombay until his death on 8 January 1956.

== Bibliography ==
- Prasad, Dharmendra (1992). Public life of Manilal Doctor. Bombay, India: Rite-Print-Pak.
- Tinker, Hugh (1974). A New System of Slavery: The Export of Indian Labour Overseas 1830-1920. London: Oxford University Press. ISBN 0192184105.
- Ramsurrun, Pahlad; Ramsurrun-Nunkoo, Sangeeta (2007). Manilal Doctor: His Activities in Mauritius. New Delhi: Sterling Publishers Private Limited.
- Ramsurrun, Pahlad (2004). Manilal Doctor: Historic Court Cases in Mauritius. New Delhi: Sterling Publishers Private Limited.
