= Indo-Fijians =

Fijians of South Asian descent

फ़िजी के हिंदुस्तानी
- (Fiji)
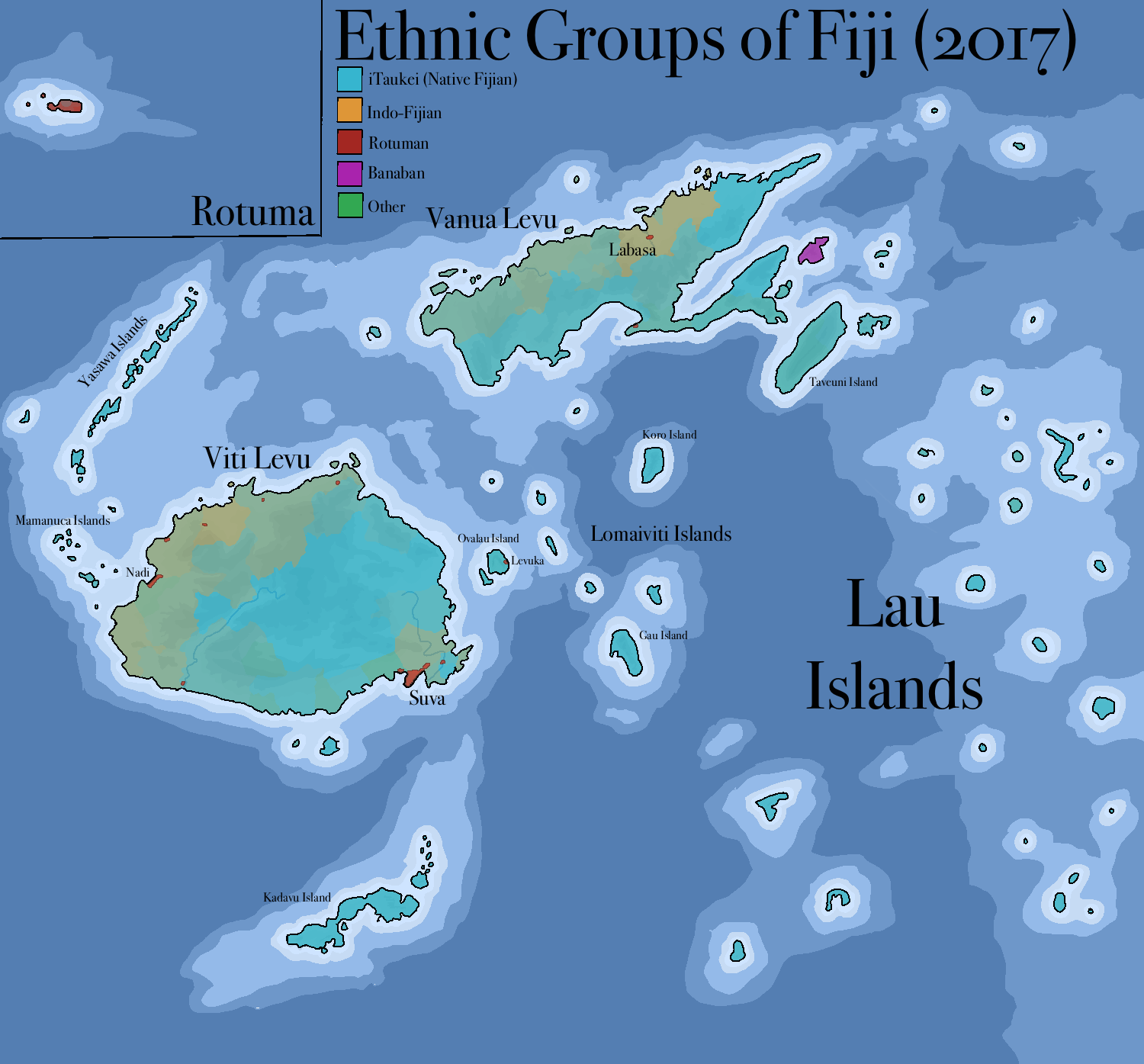
- Fiji ethnic map (2017 census) Orange is for Indo-Fijians

Total population
- 460,000; 32.7% of the population of Fiji (2017)

Regions with significant populations
- Fiji: 289,237 (2017 census)
- Australia: 61,748 (2016 census)
- New Zealand: 38,310 (2022 census)
- United States: 30,890 (2000 figure)
- Canada: 24,665 (2016 census)

Languages
- Fiji-Hindi / Fiji Baat (main dialect) • Hindi (official) • Fijian / Vosa Vakaviti (official) • Tamil • Gujarati • Punjabi • Telugu • Marathi

Religion
- Majority: Hinduism (76.7%); Minority: Islam (15.9%), Christianity (6.1%), others (1.3 %)

Related ethnic groups
- South Indians in Fiji, Indian people, Indian diaspora, South Asian diaspora, Bhojpuri people, Awadhi people, Tamil people, Telugu people, Bihari-U.P. diaspora, Tamil diaspora, Telugu diaspora, Indo-Caribbeans, Indians in South Africa, Indian diaspora in Southeast Africa, Indo-Mauritians, Indo-Guyanese, Indo-Surinamese, Indo-Jamaicans, Indo-Trinidadians and Tobagonians, Indian Singaporeans, Malaysian Indians

Indo-Fijians (Fiji Hindi: फ़िजी के हिंदुस्तानी) are Fiji nationals of South Asian descent whose ancestors, in most cases, were indentured labourers; Indo-Fijians trace their ancestry to various regions of the Indian subcontinent.

The demographic proportion of Indo-Fijians within Fiji has changed significantly since the late twentieth century. After constituting a majority of approximately 52% of the national population in the late 20th century, the community has declined to roughly 33% of the total population as of 2017, and down from 37% a decade prior. This demographic contraction was primarily initiated by the 1987 Fijian coups d'état, which prompted large-scale emigration due to political instability and concerns over increasingly hostile indigenous ethnic nationalism. Ongoing outward migration to countries such as Australia, New Zealand, Canada, and the United States, combined with a sharp decrease in fertility rates below the population replacement level, has sustained the population decline into the 21st century.

Although they hailed from various regions in the subcontinent, just about half of Indo-Fijians trace their origins to the Awadh and Bhojpur regions of the Hindi Belt in northern India. Indo-Fijians speak Fiji Hindi in Fiji also known as 'Fiji Baat' which is based on the Awadhi dialect with influence from Bhojpuri. It is a koiné language with its own grammatical features, distinct to the Modern Standard Hindi and Modern Standard Urdu spoken in South Asia. The major home districts of Fiji's North Indian labourers were Basti, Gonda, Lucknow, Kanpur, Faizabad, Ballia, Ghazipur, Gorakhpur, Sultanpur, Siwan, Shahabad, Saran, and Azamgarh, in the present-day Awadh region of Uttar Pradesh and the present-day Bhojpur region of Uttar Pradesh, Bihar and Jharkhand.

Others (in a smaller quantity) originated in West Bengal, Haryana, Tamil Nadu, Kerala, and the Telugu regions. A small contingent of indentured labourers came from Afghanistan and Nepal. Many of the Muslim Indo-Fijians also came from Sindh, West Punjab and various other parts of South Asia. Fiji's British colonial rulers brought South Asian people to the Colony of Fiji as indentured labourers between 1879 and 1916 to work on Fiji's sugar-cane plantations, with a small minority also used in Rice farming. Mahendra Chaudhry became Fiji's first Indo-Fijian Prime Minister on 19 May 1999, although he was couped just a year later.

== Early ancestors of Indo-Fijians ==
=== British discovery of Fiji ===
Through the writings of William Bligh and the discovery by Abel Tasman, British plantation owners began migrating to Fiji to become plantation owners. In 1869 the population of European settlers in Fiji was 1,250. By 1872, that number rose to 2,670 due to the low competition and high profitability in the Fijian Islands. Due to the major financial issues Chief Seru Cakobau faced, in 1874 Fiji was ceded to Great Britain. 5 years after this marked the end of what was deemed the “Deed of Cession”. Suva became a primary hub for British colonialism around the pacific. The British government swiftly began allowing the importation of indentured laborists, and started dominating the Fijian political and economic scenes. This also marked the arrival of the first batch of Indians to the Fijian islands.

=== First Indians in Fiji ===
Indians had been employed for a long time on the European ships trading in Colonial India and the East Indies. Many of the early voyages to the Pacific either started or terminated in India and many of these ships were wrecked in the uncharted waters of the South Pacific. The first recorded presence of an Indian in Fiji was by Peter Dillon, a sandalwood trader in Fiji, of a lascar (Indian seaman) who survived a shipwreck, lived and settled there amongst the natives of Fiji in 1813. The first mass immigration of Indians to Fiji happened in 1879.

=== First attempt to procure Indian labourers ===
Before Fiji was colonized by Great Britain, some planters had tried to obtain Indian labour and had approached the British Consul in Levuka, Fiji but were met with a negative response. In 1870, a direct request by a planter to the Colonial Government of India was also turned down and in 1872, an official request by the Cakobau Government was informed that British rule in Fiji was a pre-condition for Indian emigration to Fiji. The early ancestors of Indo-Fijians came from different regions of South Asia, most coming from rural villages in Northern and Southern British Raj.

In January 1879, thirty-one South Asians, who had originally been indentured labourers in Réunion, were brought from New Caledonia to Fiji under contract to work on a plantation in Taveuni. These labourers demonstrated knowledge of the terms of the indenture agreement and were aware of their rights and refused to do the heavy work assigned to them. Their contract was terminated by mutual agreement between the labourers and their employers. In 1881, thirty-eight more Indians arrived from New Caledonia, and again most of them left, but some stayed, taking Indian wives or island women.

=== Arrival under the indentured system ===
The colonial authorities promoted the sugar cane industry, recognising the need to establish a stable economic base for the colony, but were unwilling to exploit indigenous labour and threaten the Fijian way of life. The use of imported labour from the Solomon Islands and what is now Vanuatu generated protests in the United Kingdom, and the Governor Sir Arthur Hamilton-Gordon decided to implement the indentured labour scheme, which had existed in the British Empire since 1837. A recruiting office was set up especially around Calcutta and the South, West and North, later, especially a lot in rural village areas in different farming regions, land and areas.

The Leonidas, a labour transport vessel, disembarked at Levuka from Calcutta on 14 May 1879. The 498 indentured workers who disembarked were the first of over 61,000 to arrive from South and East Asia in the following 37 years. The majority were from the districts of eastern and southern provinces, followed by labourers from northern and western regions, then later southeastern countries. They originated from different regions, villages, backgrounds and castes that later mingled or intermarried, hence the "Fijian Indian" identity was created. The indentured workers originated mostly from rural village backgrounds.

=== Life during the indenture period ===
The contracts of the indentured labourers, which they called girmit (agreements), required them to work in Fiji for a period of five years. Living conditions on the sugar cane plantations, on which most of the girmityas (indentured labourers) worked, had poor standards which resembled those of slavery. Hovels known as "coolie lines" dotted the landscape.

Historical records indicate that sugar corporations resisted the education of Indian laborers, operating under the idea that academic advancement would alienate them from the soil and diminish their suitability for physical toil. The relationship between the Indian indentured servants and their employers was full of distrust and hate, this being rooted in the idea that the Arkatis (indentured servitude recruiters) promised “easy work” in a place “just across the river”. The men were even kidnapped, as there was very little government interference for British indentured servitude.

=== End of indenture ===
Public outrage in the United Kingdom and British India over human rights abuses of indentured labourers, such as the story of Kunti and Naraini played a factor in abolishing the scheme in 1916. However, Indenture continued unlawfully until the intervention of Banarsidas Chaturvedi and Reverend C.F. Andrews, which resulted in all existing indentured labourers being freed from contracts on 1 January 1920.

After the end of servitude, most Indians stayed in Fiji, mainly as farmers, but some moved into more urban areas to work. Stereotyping and resentment also began to arise between Indians and Fijians. Fijians saw Indians as dishonest and greedy, while the Indians saw the natives as lazy and uncivilized. Fijians being primarily Christian and Indians being primarily Hindu and Muslim caused very prominent religious friction. Because of these reasons, the newly freed Indians had a hard time securing political rights, especially in this newly formed independent nation primary run by the indigenous people. Following the end of indentured servitude, the measles and influenza outbreak played a crucial role in the population of Fiji. The Indian population grew significantly faster than the Fijian population. The native Fijians took a major toll from the measles and influenza epidemics, taking about 50 thousand lives over the span of about 25 years.

== Caste ==
During the period of Indian indentured migration to Fiji (1879–1916), labourers were recruited from a wide range of social, regional, and caste backgrounds in British India. These included upper, middle, and lower castes, as well as Dalit communities such as Chamars, along with Muslims and Christians. While caste identities were carried into Fiji as part of migrants’ social backgrounds, the indenture system did not formally recognise or enforce caste distinctions. On plantations, labourers of different castes lived and worked together under uniform conditions, which led to the weakening of traditional caste practices such as occupational segregation, restrictions on commensality, and ritual purity. Although aspects of caste identity persisted after indenture, particularly in marriage preferences and religious life, the rigid hierarchical structure associated with caste in India became significantly diluted in the Fijian context.

=== Caste demographics ===
Castes contributing over one percent of Fiji's North Indian early migration
Caste name	Migration during 19th century	
Caste name	Total number of caste people	%
Chamars	6,087	16.91%
Muslim	5,455	15.15%
Ahir	4,197	11.66%
Thakur	3,416	9.49%
Kurmi	2,307	6.41%
Kori	1,942	5.4%
Brahmin	1,535	4.26%
Kahar	1,500	4.17%
Khatri	1,182	3.29%
Pasi	999	2.78%
Koeri	740	2.06%
Lodha	735	2.04%
Jat	708	1.97%
Gadariya	691	1.92%
Kewat	656	1.82%
Rajput	652	1.81%
Pathan	584	1.62%
Murao	553	1.54%
Lonia	550	1.53%
Gond	541	1.5%

=== Impact of Girmit system on caste dynamics ===
Although the Girmit system subjected all labourers, regardless of caste, to harsh and exploitative conditions, migration nonetheless offered many Chamars and other oppressed groups an opportunity to escape rigid caste hierarchies. Over time, they established new communities across the globe, reshaping social identities and forging resilience in diaspora.

=== Dalit Sikh / Ravidassia ===
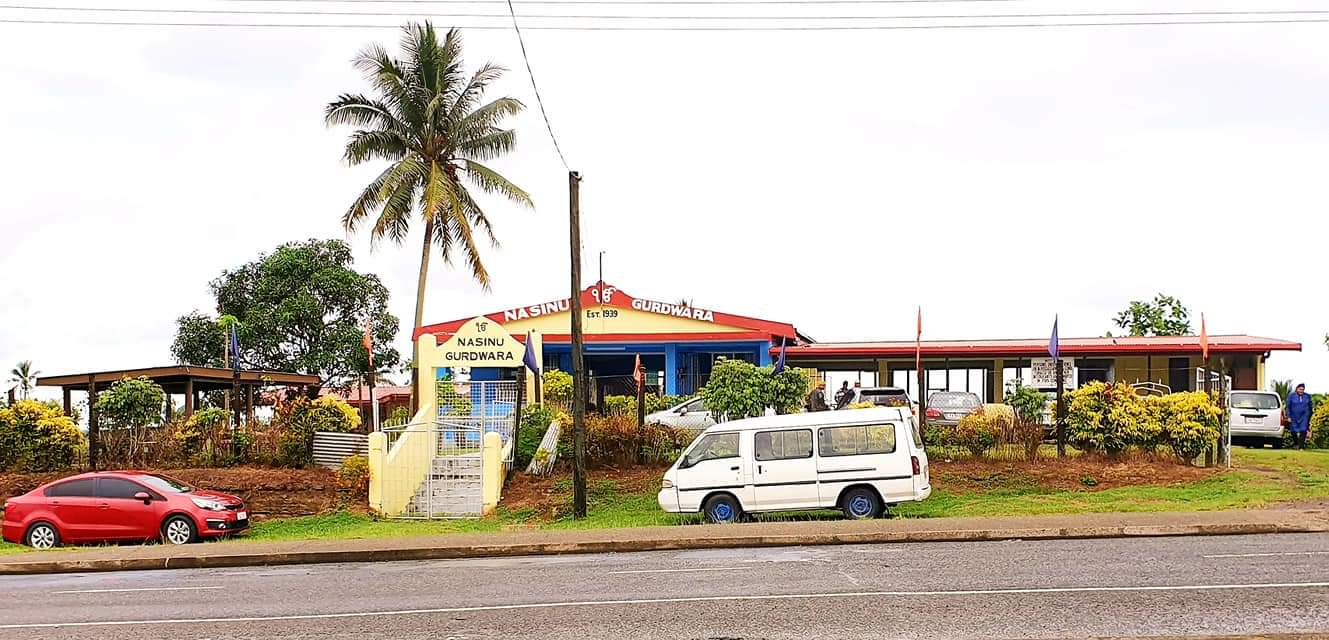
Gurdwara Guru Ravidass, Nasinu, Fiji Established by Chamar Caste in 1939

There were followers of Guru Ravidas, a 15th–16th-century bhakti saint, and these followers belonged to the Chamar/Ad-Dharmi/Ravidassia community. This group maintained distinct devotional practices centred on the teachings of Ravidas. In 1939, members of the Ravidassia community in Fiji established the Shri Guru Ravidass Gurudwara in Nasinu, which is recognised as the first Ravidassia-associated gurdwara outside India and serves as a focal point for worship and community activities. Over the decades, the Ravidassia community in Fiji has continued to be part of the broader Indo-Fijian religious landscape, contributing to Fiji’s Sikh and related devotional institutions while preserving elements of their devotional identity.

== Free immigrants/Fiji-Indians ==
From the early 1900s, Indians started arriving in Fiji as free agents. Many of these paid their own way and had previously served in Fiji or other British colonies or had been born in Fiji. A small amount of free immigrants also came from Gujarat and East Punjab. Amongst the early free migrants, there were religious teachers, missionaries and at least one lawyer. The government and other employers brought clerks, policemen, artisans, gardeners, experienced agricultural workers, a doctor, a school teacher, farmers and craftsmen also paid their own way to Fiji and in later years formed an influential minority as Fijian-Indians to the Indo-Fijians.

== Indian Platoon during the Second World War ==
In 1916, Manilal Doctor, the de facto leader of the Indo-Fijian community, persuaded the colonial government of Fiji to form an Indian platoon for the Allied war effort during the First World War. He sent the names of 32 volunteers to the colonial government but his requests were ignored. As a result, a number of Indo-Fijians volunteered for the New Zealand Army while one served in Europe during the First World War.

In 1934, Governor Fletcher enacted a policy which warranted an Indian Platoon within the Fiji Defence Force consisting entirely of enlisted-ranked Indo-Fijians. Governor Fletcher encouraged Indo-Fijians to regard Fiji as their permanent home. One could say this was Fletcher's insurance policy against an anticipated anti-European revolt at the hands of the Native population, which subsequently took place in 1959.

While the Indo-Fijian troops had the Europeans as their commanding and non-commissioned officers, the Native Fijians had Ratu Edward Cakobau, a Native Fijian, as their commanding officer. Prior to the Second World War, soldiers served voluntarily and were paid "capitation grants" according to efficiency ratings without regard to race. In 1939, during the mobilisation of the Fiji Defence Force, the colonial government changed its payment system to four shillings per day for enlisted men of European descent while enlisted men of non-European descent were paid only two shillings per day; the Indo-Fijian Platoon quickly disputed this disparity in pay. The colonial government, fearing this dissidence would eventually be shared by the Native Fijians, decided to disband the Indo-Fijian platoon in 1940 citing lack of available equipment, such as military armour, as their reason.

== Labels: Unifying an identity ==
'Indians' in Fiji were originally defined by the constitution of Fiji as anybody who can trace, through either the male or the female line, their ancestry back to anywhere on the Indian subcontinent and all government documents used this name.

However, in August 2008, shortly before the proposed People's Charter for Change, Peace and Progress was due to be released to the public, it was announced that it recommended a change in the name of Fiji's citizens. If the proposal were adopted, all citizens of Fiji, whatever their ethnicity, would be called "Fijians". The Cabinet, at its meeting on 30 June 2010, approved the Fijian Affairs [Amendment] Decree 2010. The new law effectively replaces the words 'Fijian' or 'indigenous' or 'indigenous Fijian' with the word 'iTaukei' in all written laws and all official documentation when referring to the original and native settlers of Fiji. All Fiji citizens are now called 'Fijians'

The correct label and identity for Indo-Fijians has historically been debated. Common labels such as Fijian Indian, as Fiji-Indian and Indo-Fijian have been used interchangeably. These labels have proved culturally and politically controversial, and finding a single label of identification for those with South Asian ancestry in Fiji has fuelled a debate that has continued for many decades.

Labels that use the term 'Indian' can be seen as problematic. This is because the term 'Indian' no longer accurately represents people with ancestry from the various countries of the Indian subcontinent, such as modern-day Pakistan, Bangladesh, and Nepal.

=== Historic Identities: Indo Fijians versus indigenous Fijians ===
In the late 1960s, the leader of the National Federation Party, A. D. Patel, who used the slogan, "One Country, One People, One Destiny", suggested that all Fiji's citizens should be called Fijians and to distinguish the original inhabitants from the rest, the name Taukei should be used for native Fijians. At the time, there was opposition to this from some native Fijians who feared that any such move would deprive them of the special privileges they had enjoyed since cession in 1874. The Fiji Times started using Fiji Islander to describe all Fiji's citizens but this name did not catch on.

=== Luvedra na Ratu: A new identity for Indo-Fijians of indentured descent ===
In 2017, the paramount chief of Rewa, Ro Teimumu Kepa, announced that the descendants of indentured labourers, who were brought to Fiji during the colonial period as cheap labour, now officially belong to the Vanua (tribal land) of Noco and Rewa, and will be known as the iCavuti of "Luvedra na Ratu" (The Children of the Ratu). This decision was made in a traditional ceremony held at Ratu Sauvoli School grounds in Nabudrau, where the Tikina (a traditional Fijian political unit) of Noco presented their iCavuti to Ro Teimumu. This is the first time ever that the descendants of indentured labourers have been bestowed with a new iTaukei identity.

=== The 'Fiji-Indian' Label ===
For a long time, Fiji Indian was used to distinguish between Fiji citizens of Indian origin and Indians from India. The term was used by writers like K.L. Gillion and by the academic and politician, Ahmed Ali. The late President of Fiji, Ratu Sir Kamisese Mara, also used this term in his speeches and writings. The term was also used by the Methodist Church of Fiji and Rotuma, Fiji's largest Christian denomination, which had a Fiji-Indian division.

The use of the terms 'Fiji-Indian' or 'Fijian-Indian' is a misnomer. This is because the meaning of the words 'Indian' and 'India' has changed over time, including during the British colonial rule and before it. Historically, the subcontinent of South Asia was informally referred to as "India" by foreign travelers and cartographers, the people living there were called 'Indians'. However, after the British colonial rule and the subsequent partitioning and division of the subcontinent into several countries, including India, Pakistan, and Bangladesh, the term 'India' primarily began to refer to the country that gained independence from the British in 1947, and 'Indian' began to refer primarily to citizens and inhabitants of that new country, rather than all people of the subcontinent. This change in political demarcation and the formation of new countries has caused the meanings of 'India' and 'Indian' to evolve into a national identity. The terms 'Fiji-Indian' or 'Fijian-Indian' also no longer accurately reflect those who have Girmitya ancestry that hail from other parts of the subcontinent. This term, however, is more accurate for the free immigrants who came after the Indenture System was abolished, as they still hold a cultural and familial tie to the country.

=== Indo-Fijian ===
With the creation of the independent nation of India in 1947, the term "Indian" began to be used more frequently to refer specifically to citizens of the Republic of India. However, the sub-continent of India still exists, comprising many countries such as India, Pakistan, Bangladesh, Nepal, Bhutan, Sri Lanka, the Maldives and Afghanistan. It is commonly referred to as South Asia, a more accurate geographic description and preferred term in many academic and scholarly contexts. Therefore, the term 'Indo-Fijian' is preferred as a way to refer to people with ancestry from the various regions of the sub-continent (such as modern-day Pakistan, Bangladesh, Nepal and Afghanistan) rather than just those from modern-day India.

The term is also more closely connected to the diaspora of the South Asian indentured labourers (or Coolies) who have settled in other countries, such as the Indo-Caribbeans, Indo-Mauritians, etc.

This term, 'Indo-Fijian', has been used by various political figures such as Frank Bainimarama and Sitiveni Rabuka, as well as writers such as Adrian Mayer and Brij Lal. Ratu Joni Madraiwiwi, Fiji's Vice-President from 2004 to 2006, also used it in his speeches.

In 2006, Jone Navakamocea, Minister of State for National Planning in the Qarase government, called for the use of the term "Indo-Fijian" to be officially banned. He declared that the term was "unacceptable" and that Indo-Fijians should be referred to only as "Indians". The Hindustan Times reported Navakamocea had "alleged that the Indo-Fijian term was coined by Indian academics in Fiji to 'Fijianise' their Indian ethnicity", which, in Navakamocea's view, undermined the paramountcy of indigenous rights. Navakamocea lost office in the 2006 military coup when the army accused the Qarase government of anti-Indo Fijian racism and overthrew it.

== Political participation: early 20th century ==
The colonial rulers attempted to assuage Indo-Fijian discontent by providing for one of their number to be nominated to the Legislative Council from 1916 onwards. Badri Maharaj, a strong supporter of the British Empire but with little support among his own people, was appointed by the Governor in 1916. His appointment did little to redress the grievances of the Indo-Fijian community. Buttressed by the Indian Imperial Association founded by Manilal Maganlal, a lawyer who had arrived in Fiji in 1912, the Indians continued to campaign for better work and living conditions, and for an extension of the municipal franchise; literacy tests disqualified most Indo-Fijians from participation. A strike by Indo-Fijian municipal workers and Public Works Department employees, which began on 15 January 1920, ended in a riot that was forcibly quelled on 12 February; Manilal, widely blamed for the unrest, was deported. Another strike, from January to July in 1921, led by Sadhu (priest) Vashist Muni, demanded higher rates of pay for workers of the Colonial Sugar Refining Company (CSR), the unconditional return of Manilal, and the release of imprisoned 1920 strikers. The authorities responded by deporting Muni from Fiji.

Demands increased for direct representation in the legislature. In 1929, South Asian immigrants and their descendants were authorised to elect three members to the Legislative Council on a communal roll. Vishnu Deo, James Ramchandar Rao and Parmanand Singh were duly elected. Agitation continued for a common roll, which the colonial administrators rejected, citing the fears of European settlers and Fijian chiefs that a common electoral roll would lead to political domination by South Asians, whose numbers were rapidly increasing. The fear of Indo-Fijian domination also led to the abolition of the elected membership of Suva Municipal Council in 1934, with the council becoming a wholly appointed body.

== Religious and social divisions: 1920–1945 ==
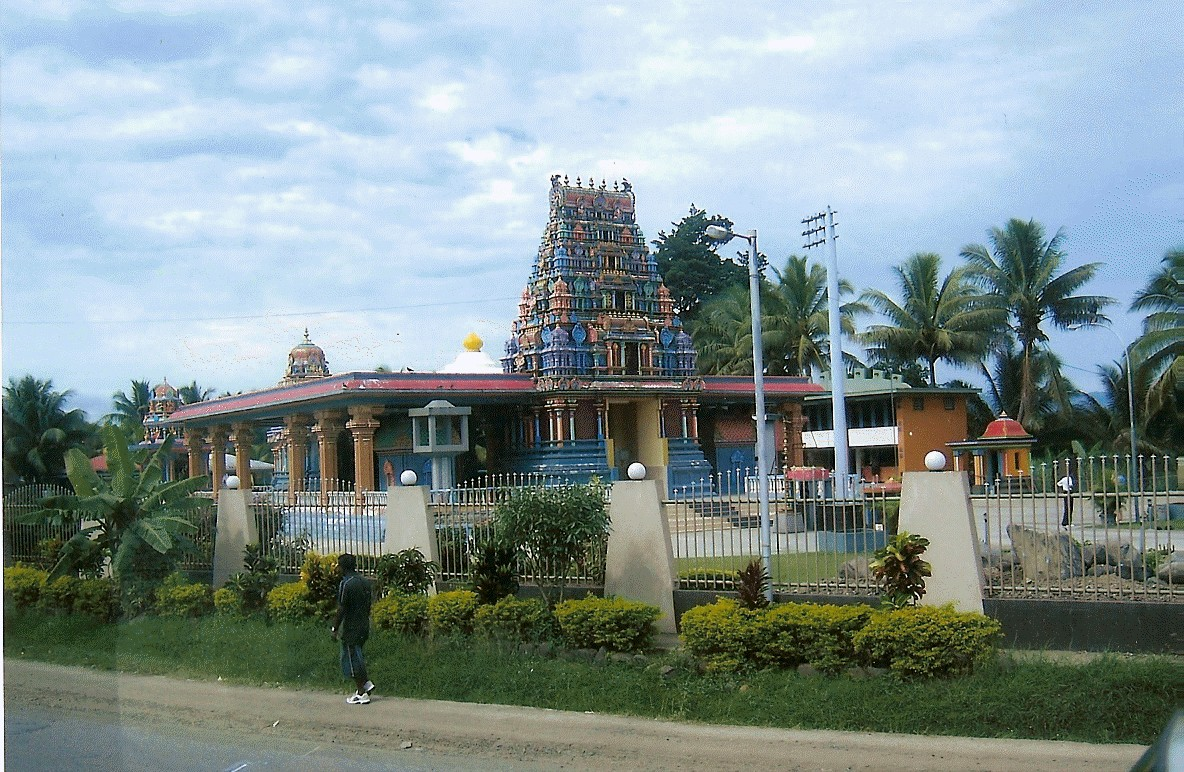
The Sri Siva Subramaniya temple, a South-Indian type temple in the Indo-Fijian town of Nadi.

Two major Hindu movements attracted widespread support in the 1920s, and relationships between Hindus and Muslims also became increasingly strained.

The Arya Samaj in Fiji advocated purging Hinduism of what it saw as its superstitious elements and expensive rituals, opposed child marriage, and advocated the remarriage of widows, which orthodox Hinduism didn't promote at that time. The Arya Samaj also encouraged education for girls, which wasn't the norm at the time. The Arya Samaj began by establishing schools and by using a newspaper of one of its supporters, the Fiji Samachar, founded in 1923, to expound their views.

== Developments since 1945 ==
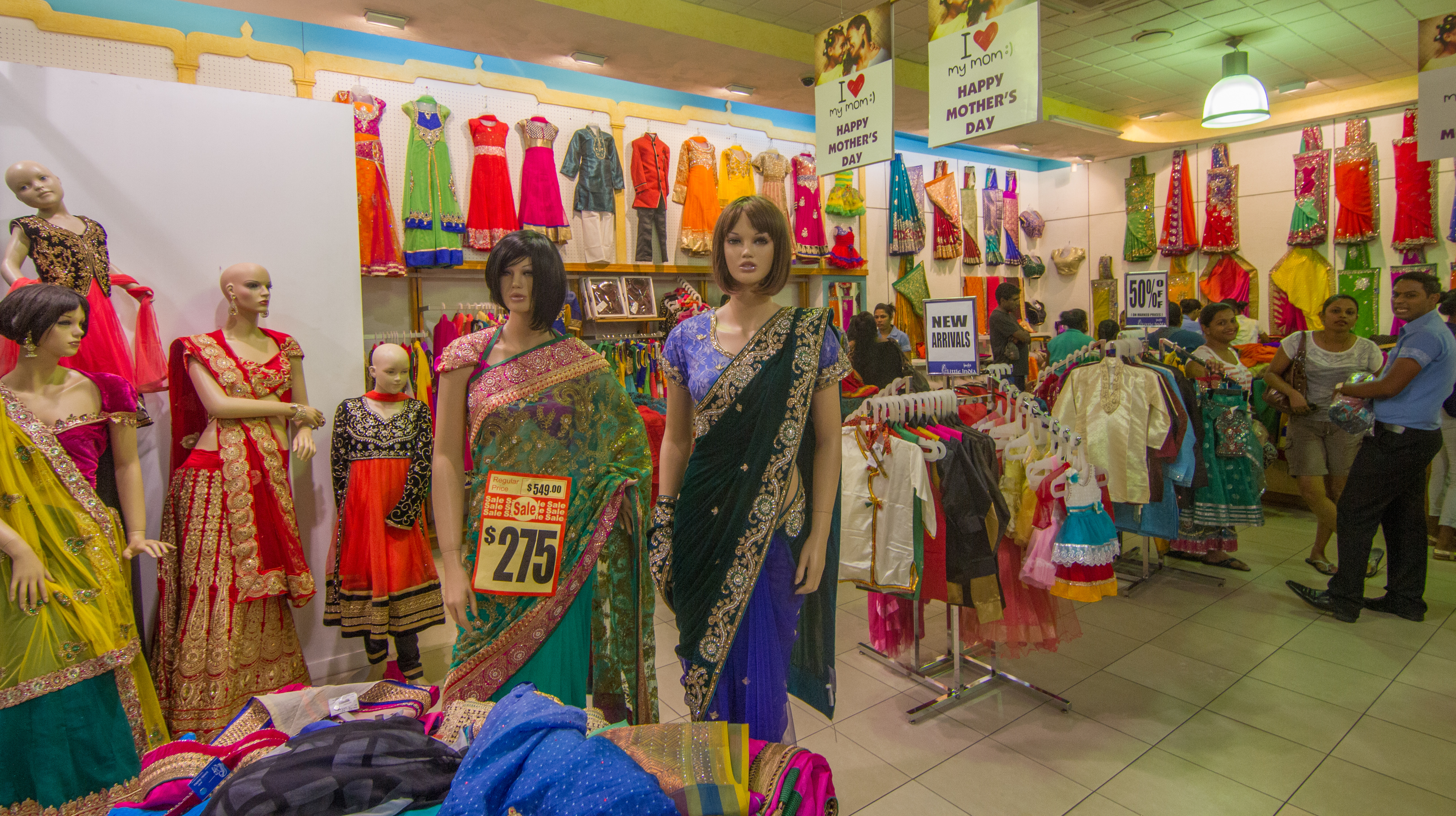
Saris on sale in Lautoka, Viti Levu

A post-war effort by European members of the Legislative Council to repatriate ethnic South Asians to modern-day India, starting with sixteen-year-old males and fourteen-year-old females, was not successful, but reflected the tensions between Fiji's ethnic communities.

Differences between ethnic Fijians and Indo-Fijians complicated preparations for Fiji's independence, which the United Kingdom granted in 1970, and have continued to define Fiji politics since. Prior to independence, Indo-Fijians sought a common electoral roll, based on the principle of "one man, one vote." Ethnic Fijian leaders opposed this, believing that it would favour urban voters who were mostly Indo-Fijian; they sought a communal franchise instead, with different ethnic groups voting on separate electoral rolls. At a specially convened conference in London in April 1970, a compromise was worked out, under which parliamentary seats would be allocated by ethnicity, with ethnic Fijians and Indo-Fijians represented equally. In the House of Representatives, each ethnic group was allocated 22 seats, with 12 representing Communal constituencies (elected by voters registered as members of their particular ethnic group) and a further 10 representing National constituencies (distributed by ethnicity but elected by universal suffrage. A further 8 seats were reserved for ethnic minorities, 3 from "communal" and 5 from "national" constituencies.

In 1987, shortly after a coalition government was formed that represented both communities, two military coups were staged by low-ranking Fijian officers that aimed at sidelining the Indo-Fijian community in politics.

Ethnic South Asians outnumbered indigenous Fijians from 1956 through the late 1980s. This was due to the death of 1/3 of the indigenous population, mainly male and children, who died from measles contracted when King Cakobau and other chief leaders returned from a trip from Australia in 1875, during which they caught measles. The percentage of the Indigenous female population increased as a result, and the native male population was scarce at one stage, but by 2000 their share of the population had declined to 43.7%, because of a higher ethnic-Fijian birthrate and particularly because of the greater tendency of Indo-Fijians to emigrate. Emigration accelerated following the coups of 1987 (which removed an Indo-Fijian-supported government from power and, for a time, ushered in a constitution that discriminated against them in numerous ways) and of 2000 (which removed an Indo-Fijian Prime Minister from office).

Political differences between the two communities, rather than ideological differences, have characterised Fijian politics since independence, with the two communities generally voting for different political parties. The National Federation Party founded by A.D. Patel, was the party favoured overwhelmingly by the Indo-Fijian community throughout most of the nation's history, but its support collapsed in the parliamentary election of 1999, when it lost all of its seats in the House of Representatives; its support fell further still in the 2001 election, when it received only 22% of the Indo-Fijian vote, and in the 2006 election, when it dropped to an all-time low of 14%. The party formerly favoured by Indo-Fijians was the Fiji Labour Party, led by Mahendra Chaudhry, which received about 75% of the Indo-Fijian vote in 2001, and won all 19 seats reserved for Indo-Fijians. Founded as a multi-racial party in the 1980s, it was supported mostly by Indo-Fijians, but has seen no representation in parliament since the coup of 2006.

== Impact of the Church and religious/ethnic politics ==
The Church plays a major role in Fiji's politics. Often, some leaders appeal to Fijians, addressing them as "Christians", even though Hindus are 33% of the population in Fiji, compared with 52% Christians. The 2000 Fijian coup d'état that removed the elected PM Mahendra Chaudhry was supported by the Methodist Church.

Some Methodist Church authorities have continued to advocate the establishment of a Christian state. In a letter of support from the then head of the Methodist Church, Reverend Tomasi Kanilagi, to George Speight, the leader of the 19 May 2000 armed takeover of Parliament, Reverend Kanilagi publicly expressed his intention to use the Methodist Church as a forum under which to unite all ethnic Fiji political parties. The Methodist church also supported forgiveness to those who plotted the coup in form of so-called "Reconciliation, Tolerance, and Unity Bill".

In 2005, Methodist Church general secretary Reverend Ame Tugaue argued that the practice of Hinduism and other religions should not be guaranteed in law:

"Sodom and Gomorrah were only destroyed after the Lord removed the faithful from there and not because of a few would we allow God's wrath to befall the whole of Fiji. It was clearly stated in the 10 Commandments that God gave to Moses that Christians were not allowed to worship any other gods and not to worship idols. One thing other religions should be thankful for is that they are tolerated in Fiji as it's naturally a peaceful place but their right of worship should never be made into law."

Following the military coup in Fiji, which deposed the government of Laisenia Qarase (which Indo-Fijians claimed as unsympathetic to Indo-Fijian interests), Reverend Tuikilakila Waqairatu of the Fiji Council of Churches and Assembly of Christian Churches has stated that the coup is "un-Christian" and is "manifestation of darkness and evil". He claimed that "52% of Fijians are Christian and the country's Christian values are being undermined."

== Demographic factors ==
Indo Fijians are concentrated in the so-called Sugar Belt and in cities and towns on the northern and western coasts of Viti Levu and Vanua Levu; their numbers are much scarcer in the south and inland areas. The majority of Indo-Fijians came from northern, northeastern and southeastern parts of India and converse in what is known as Fiji Hindi (also known as 'Fiji Baat'). This language has been constructed from eastern Hindi dialects mixed with some native Fijian and some English loan words, with some minorities speaking Gujarati, and Punjabi, and many who speak Tamil as their mother tongue with less fluency. Almost all Indo-Fijians are fluent in English.

According to the 1996 census (the latest available), 76.7% of Indo-Fijians are Hindus and a further 15.9% are Muslims. Christians comprise 6.1% of the Indo-Fijian population, while about 0.9% are members of the Sikh faith. The remaining 0.4% are mostly nonreligious.

Hindus in Fiji belong mostly to the Sanātana Dharma sect (74.3% of all Hindus); a minority (3.7%) follow Arya Samaj. Smaller groups, including The International Society for Krishna Consciousness, and numerous unspecified Hindu sects, comprise 22% of the Hindu population. Muslims are mostly Sunni (59.7%) or unspecified (36.7%); there is an Ahmadiya minority (3.6%). Indian Christians are a diverse body, with Methodists forming the largest group (26.2%), followed by the Assemblies of God (22.3%), Roman Catholics (17%), and Anglicans (5.8%). The remaining 28.7% belong to a medley of denominations. There is an Indian Division of the Methodist Church in Fiji. About 5000 Indo-Fijians are Methodist. They are part of the Methodist Church in Fiji and support the position of the Methodist Church in Fiji, rather than the rights of Indo-Fijians.

== Diaspora ==
The Indo-Fijian diaspora developed with people of South Asian ancestry leaving Fiji, mainly following the racially inspired coups of 1987 and 2000, to settle primarily in Australia, New Zealand, United States and Canada. Smaller numbers have settled in other Pacific islands, the United Kingdom and other European countries.

South Asians were initially brought to Fiji as indentured laborers to work on sugar cane plantations. Between 1879 and 1916, a total of 60,000 South Asians arrived in Fiji. Approximately 25,000 of these have returned to South Asia. From 1900 onwards, some Indians arrived as free immigrants, who were mostly from the regions of Gujarat (including Kutch) and Punjab.

Indo-Fijians have been emigrating to the United States, Canada, Australia, New Zealand and the United Kingdom since the early 1960s. These were mainly economic migrants and their number gradually increased in the 1970s and 1980s to reach approximately 4000 per year.

Following the military coup of 1987, many Indo-Fijians saw little future in staying in Fiji and tried to find any means to leave the country. The professional, middle class and business found it easier to emigrate. It has been estimated that more than 100,000 Indo-Fijians have emigrated since 1987. This represents a third of the existing Indian population in Fiji.

They were victimized a lot by the military, adding to the reasons they moved abroad to Canada, Australia and the United States. Another reason a lot of skilled Indo-Fijians were migrating to other countries was for a better future. This caused Fiji to lose a lot of its skilled workers. Moreover, many Indo-Fijians strived for a better education causing a bigger gap between them and the indigenous Fijians.

Former Prime Minister Chaudhry has expressed alarm at the high rate of emigration of educated Indo-Fijians. "If the trend continues, Fiji will be left with a large pool of poorly educated, unskilled workforce with disastrous consequences on our social and economic infrastructure and levels of investment," he said on 19 June 2005. He blamed the coups of 1987 for "brain drain" which has, he said, adversely affected the sugar industry, the standard of the education and health services, and the efficiency of the civil service.

== Health issues ==
Similarly to the indigenous Fijian population, Indo-Fijian's face major obstacles when it comes to health. They are often cited in research articles as a group that has a higher-than-normal prevalence rate of Type 2 diabetes.

== List of notable Indo-Fijians ==
- Joy Ali, boxer
- Junior Farzan Ali, boxer
- Shabana Azeez, Australian actress
- Ganesh Chand, academic, historian, statesman, and jazz musician
- Rajesh Chandra, first Vice-Chancellor of University of Fiji and present Vice-Chancellor and President of the University of the South Pacific
- Mahendra Chaudhry, fourth Prime Minister of Fiji
- Imrana Jalal, human rights advisor to the United Nations Development Program and as a member of the International Commission of Jurists
- Rocky Khan, New Zealand Rugby sevens player
- Roy Krishna, soccer player
- Siddiq Moidin Koya, first Leader of Opposition in the Parliament of Fiji after independence; statesman and prominent lawyer
- Brij Lal, historian
- Prerna Lal, US-based attorney and civil rights advocate
- Shaneel Lal, queer and indigenous rights activist
- Shireen Lateef, women's rights activist
- James Madhavan, one of Fiji's longest serving parliamentarians
- Julian Moti, former Attorney General of the Solomon Islands.
- Satya Nandan, chairman of the Western and Central Pacific Fisheries Commission
- Rajen Prasad, former member of parliament in New Zealand
- Jack Ram, Tongan Rugby player, of Indo-Fijian descent
- Jai Ram Reddy, former leader of opposition in Fiji and member of the International Criminal Tribunal for Rwanda
- Sir Anand Satyanand, Governor-General of New Zealand from 2006–2011
- Aiyaz Sayed-Khaiyum, Fiji's Attorney-General since 8 January 2007
- Faiza Shaheen, British Economist, Half Indo-Fijian
- Nazhat Shameem, UNHRC president, elected in January 2021
- Vivekanand Sharma, former minister for Youth and Sports, former president of Sanatam Dharam, orator, former director of Radio Fiji
- Rekha Sharma, Canadian actress
- Ajit Swaran Singh, district court judge in New Zealand
- Bobby Singh, retired professional American and Canadian football guard
- Lisa Singh, Australian Senator
- Nalini Singh, paranormal romance author
- Vijay Singh, former world number one golfer
- Tanita Tikaram, singer-songwriter based in the United Kingdom, has Indo-Fijian father, great-niece of Sir Moti Tikaram
- Ramon Tikaram, actor, brother of Tanita Tikaram
- Ben Volavola, rugby union player

== See also ==
- Indian indenture system
- Arya Samaj in Fiji
- Fiji Hindi
- South Indians in Fiji
- Gujaratis in Fiji
- Hinduism in Fiji
- Hindustani language
- Islam in Fiji
- Sikhism in Fiji
- Girmityas

== Bibliography ==
- Tinker, H. A New System of Slavery: The Export of Indian Labour Overseas 1820-1920, Oxford University Press, London, 1974
- Lal, B.V. Girmitiyas: The Origins of the Fiji Indians, Fiji Institute of Applied Studies, Lautoka, Fiji, 2004
- Khal Torabully (with Marina Carter), Coolitude : An Anthology of the Indian Labour Diaspora, Anthem Press (2002) ISBN 1-84331-003-1
- Gaiutra Bahadur, Coolie Woman: The Odyssey of Indenture. The University of Chicago (2014) ISBN 978-0-226-21138-1
