= Hinduism in Mauritius =

- Goddess Durga in Ganga Talao

Total population
- c. 589,423 (2022 census) (47.81% of total population)

Languages
- Sacred: Sanskrit and Old Tamil; Majority: Mauritian Bhojpuri, Marathi, Tamil, Telugu, Mauritian Creole, English, French and other South Asian languages

Hinduism came to Mauritius when Indians were brought as indentured labourers to French Mauritius and later, in much larger numbers, to British Mauritius' plantation fields and neighbouring islands in the Indian Ocean. These immigrants primarily came from what are now the Indian States of Bihar, Uttar Pradesh, Jharkhand, Maharashtra, Tamil Nadu, Telangana, Andhra Pradesh, West Bengal and Odisha as well as from the Madhesh Province of Nepal.

Hinduism is the largest religion in Mauritius, accounting for approximately 47.81% of the current population according to the 2022 census. They were c. 589,423 out of the c. 1,233,097 population as per the census. As such, Mauritius has the third largest percentage of Hindus in the world, after Nepal and India, and remains the only country in Africa where Hinduism forms a plurality of the population.

== Demographics ==
Year	Percentage	Change
1871	51.97%	-
1881	55.99%	+4.02%
1891	56.10%	+0.11%
1901	55.62%	-0.48%
1911	54.26%	-1.36%
1921	52.70%	-1.56%
1931	50.37%	-2.33%
1941	47.26%	-3.11%
1951	46.97%	-0.29%
1961	47.55%	+0.58%
1971	49.56%	+2.01%
1981	50.65%	+1.09%
1991	50.63%	-0.02%
2001	49.64%	-0.99%
2011	48.54%	-1.10%
2022	47.81%	-0.73%

== History ==
Historical population
Year	Pop.	±%
1871	132,652	—
1881	202,281	+52.5%
1891	209,079	+3.4%
1901	206,131	−1.4%
1911	202,716	−1.7%
1921	201,895	−0.4%
1931	202,192	+0.1%
1944	203,709	+0.8%
1952	241,660	+18.6%
1962	332,851	+37.7%
1972	421,707	+26.7%
1983	506,486	+20.1%
1990	535,028	+5.6%
2000	585,210	+9.4%
2011	600,327	+2.6%
2022	589,423	−1.8%

The European colonial powers banned slave capture and trading in the first half of the 19th century. The British Empire banned them in the early decades of the 19th century. However, demand kept rising for low cost, high intensity labor in colonial plantations of sugarcane, cotton, tobacco and other cash crops. The British Empire substituted the slave labour supplies from Africa with indentured labour supplies from India.

Indentured people brought from India were primarily Hindus, but also Muslims and Christians. They were subject to indenture, a long-established form of contract which bound them to forced labour for a fixed term; apart from the fixed term of servitude, this resembled slavery. The first ships carrying indentured labourers from India left in 1836. Sugarcane, a crop that is native to India, does not grow in the cold latitudes such as those found in Europe, but grows in tropical latitudes. It was grown in large colonial tropical plantations to meet the growing European and American demand. It is these sugarcane and other tropical cash crop plantations that brought the indentured Hindus and other migrants from India to Mauritius, and other tropical colonies such as Fiji, Jamaica, Trinidad, Martinique, Suriname among others.

The Hindus and non-Hindus who accepted indentured labour contracts and were brought to Mauritius faced difficult conditions in India. Poverty in colonial India, starvation, epidemics and severe periodic famines in British Raj were rampant during colonial rule. Millions of Indians died from mass starvation during the 19th-century British India. The extreme circumstances broke families, villages and triggered migrations. By 1839, Mauritius already had 25,000 Indians working in slave-like conditions in its colonial plantations, but these were predominantly men since colonial labour laws prevented women and children from accompanying them. In the 1840s, a severe shortage of cheap labour in British plantation colonies led to the systematic shipment of a large number of Indian indentured labourers to Mauritius, both men and women, particularly from the ports of Calcutta, Bombay and Madras. The Hindus and non-Hindus of India who arrived in Mauritius were a small percentage of the over 30 million indentured Indian workers shipped around the colonial world between the 18th and early 20th century (many of whom returned after serving for years on plantations).

By the time Mauritius gained independence from the British Empire, a majority of its population were of Indian heritage. About 70% of Mauritius' total population is of Indian origin. Those who identify as Hindu constitute about 48% of the total population, and make up about 69% of those of Indian origin.

== Languages ==
The majority language spoken by Hindus, like with any other ethnic group on the island, is Mauritian Creole. Mauritian Bhojpuri, Marathi, Tamil and Telugu are still spoken despite having been in sharp decline as mother tongue over the years but are taught as ancestral languages in some public schools. Politically active Hindus have attempted to preserve Hindi by calling it their mother tongue and ancestral language; erasing differences between Bhojpuri and Hindi, despite the fact that the latter language was never spoken natively in Mauritius. Most Hindus mainly use Mauritian Creole in their daily lives – a French-based creole language that developed on the island in the colonial era, through contact between various groups, including Indians and Africans.

Mauritius produces many Bhojpuri language television programs on the Mauritius Broadcasting Corporation, the state-owned TV channel. Hindus in Mauritius that widely use Bhojpuri reside in the rural south and the north-central region near La Nicolière. They primarily hail from the Gangetic plain regions of western Bihar State and eastern Uttar Pradesh State of India, and their mother tongue is a modified form – a koiné – of the original Bhojpuri language that is spoken in India by the Bhojpuri people.

== Social stratification and caste system ==
The first Hindus that settled in Mauritius did not observe the caste system and inter-caste restrictions have been unimportant in Mauritius. Most scholars observe that this may be because "the economic and political conditions in the host societies where Indian indentured labourers were introduced had conditions that were not conducive to the maintenance of caste", and that caste was not a principle of social organisation as all Indian labourers (Coolies) were "doing the same kind of work and sharing the same living conditions".

However, casteism has become an integral part of Mauritian politics. The major political parties which are involved in general elections propose Hindu candidates on the basis of their castes in order to match the caste demographics of voters in each constituency and district. Casteism is a major consideration by politicians who strictly respect this system although they tend to publicly deny its existence in Mauritius.

What is now known as the Vaish caste in Mauritius is a relatively recent innovation which did not exist when Coolies arrived on the island in and after 1836. In Mauritius, the term Vaish nowadays collectively refers to the sub-castes namely Ahirs, Koeris, Kurmis, Yadavs, Banias, Chamars and Kayasthas.

Another relatively modern form of stratification emerged in 1983 when the MMM attempted to isolate the Hindi-speaking Hindus by inventing the new group TTM (Tamil, Telegu, Marathi). The MMM also attempted to separate the Ravived and Rajput castes from the Vaish group for political gains during the 1983 elections, but these methods failed as the MMM lost these elections after being in power for less than a year.

== Denominations ==
The subgroup mentioned by Hindus for 2022 Census is given below:

Group	Population	% of Country Population	% of Hindu Population
Aryan	953	0.08%	–
Arya Samajist	204	0.02%	–
Arya Samajist, Others	31	0.00%	–
Hindu	469,416	38.08%	97.50%
Kabir Panthi	86	0.01%	–
Marathi	18,710	1.52%	–
Marathi Hindu	342	0.03%	0.07%
Puranic Hindu	108	0.01%	–
Rajput	939	0.08%	–
Ravived	73	0.01%	–
Sanatanist	461	0.04%	–
Tamil	63,069	5.11%	–
Tamil Hindu	881	0.07%	0.18%
Telugu	24,863	2.02%	–
Telugu Hindu	353	0.03%	0.07%
Vedic Hindu	6,234	0.51%	1.29%
Bengali Hindu	12	0.00%	–
Gujarati Hindu	50	0.00%	–
Other Hindus	3,478	0.28%	0.72%
Total Hindu Population (all listed groups)	589,423	47.81%	–

== Major Hindu festivals ==
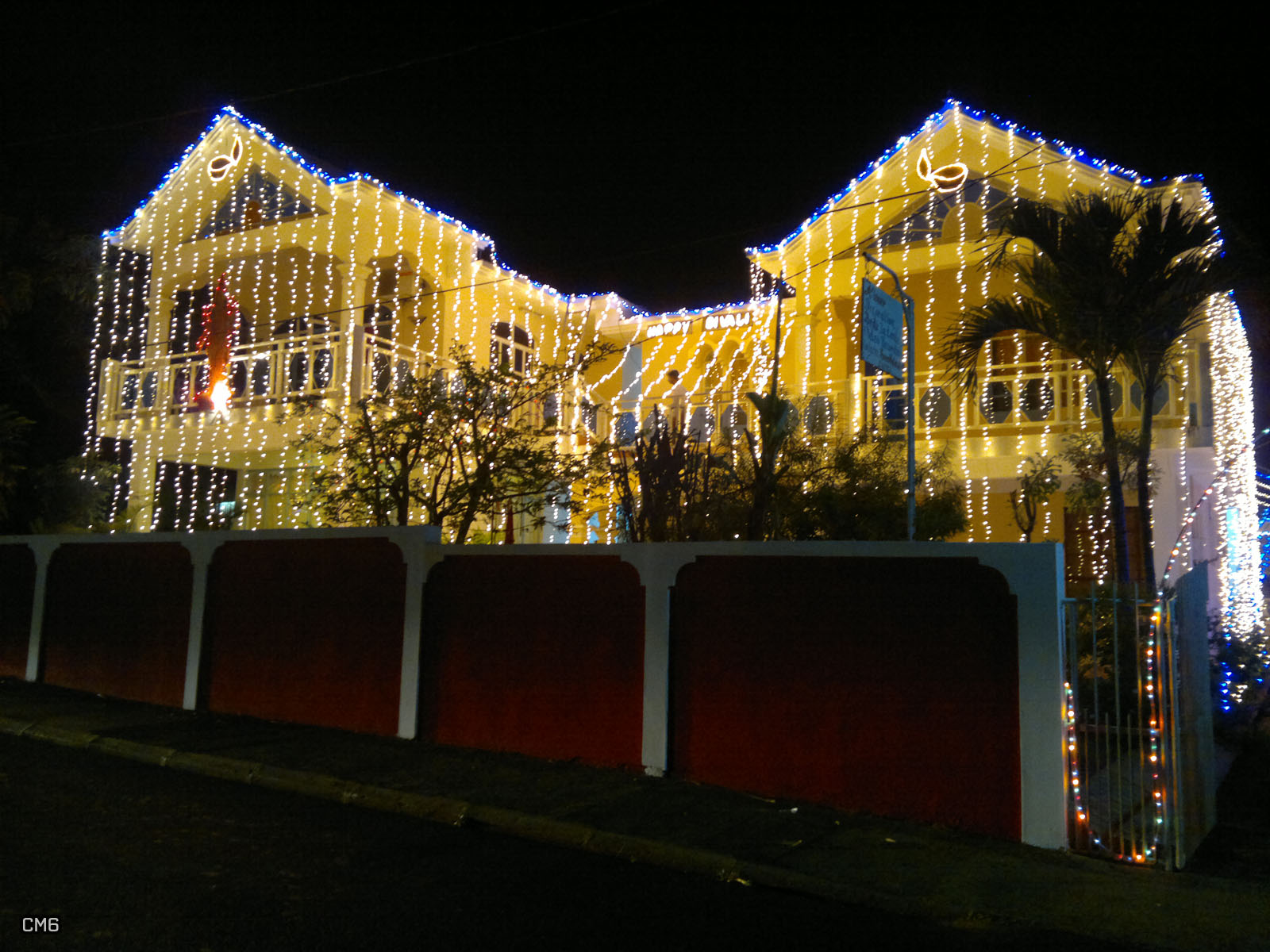

^{Hindus in Mauritius observe major festivals, such as Diwali in Port Louis above}

- Mahashivratri ("The Great Night of Shiva") is one of the biggest Hindu festivals occurring on a public holiday celebrated in Mauritius mainly by Bihari Hindus and also other Hindu communities. During this annual Hindu celebration, which takes place in the months of February and March, seven to sometimes forty days of fasting and ongoing preparations for pilgrimage to bring the Ganga Jal from Ganga Talao finally lead up to an overnight vigil of Lord Shiva's worship.

Other important Hindu festivals in Mauritius include:

- Thaipusam Cavadee, honoring Lord Murugan/Kartikeya. This Hindu festival is particularly observed by Tamil Hindus, hence is attributed as a public holiday to them.
- Ganesh Chaturthi, a Hindu festival occurring on a public holiday assigned to the extensive Marathi-speaking community, celebrates the birth of Lord Ganesha.
- Shravan Maas, an annual Hindu festival occurring during monsoon month, is celebrated just like Mahashivratri on the island. Pilgrims/devotees fast during it and walk/travel to Ganga Talao to fetch Ganga Jal so they can offer it on Shivling.
- Durga Puja/Navratri, celebrated in honour of the titular Goddess Durga over nine days and nine nights venerating her nine different forms. This Hindu festival comes twice in a year, during March to April months and October to November months.
- Divali ("The Festival of Lights"), also known as Deepawali. This Hindu festival is a national public holiday in Mauritius. It is widely popular, cuts across ethnic barriers, with Mauritian Christians observing it as well.
- Ugadi/Gudi Padwa, a Hindu New Year festival occurring on a public holiday particularly observed by Telugus and Marathis respectively.
- Holi ("The Festival of Colors") is also widely popular and cuts across ethnic barriers where everyone celebrate it together. One day before it Holika Dahan is being performed together with Chawtaal which is an Indian folk music.
- Ram Nawmi, celebrated in honour of the ideal King of Ayodhya Lord Rama who is the embodiment of a man's perfect character. Apart the Tamil Hindus, other Hindu communities celebrate it grandly specially Awadhis. Coincidently it comes together with March-April months of Durga Nawmi.
- Pongal/Makar Sankranti, a Hindu harvest festival dedicated to the Sun God Surya, particularly observed by Tamil and Bihari Hindus respectively. It is also known as Uttarayan in other Hindu communities.
- Hanuman Jayanti, a Hindu festival celebrating the birth of ape God Hanuman who is famous for his great devotion towards Lord Rama. On this occasion Hanuman Chalisa is being chanted 108 times.
- Krishna Janmashtami, a Hindu festival celebrating the birth of Dwarka King Lord Krishna. Every year during this occasion ISKCON organises the Jagannath Rath Yatra.

== Temples in Mauritius ==
The island is dotted with temples in both North Indian Nagara and South Indian Dravidian styles. The International Society for Krishna Consciousness maintains several temples in Mauritius.

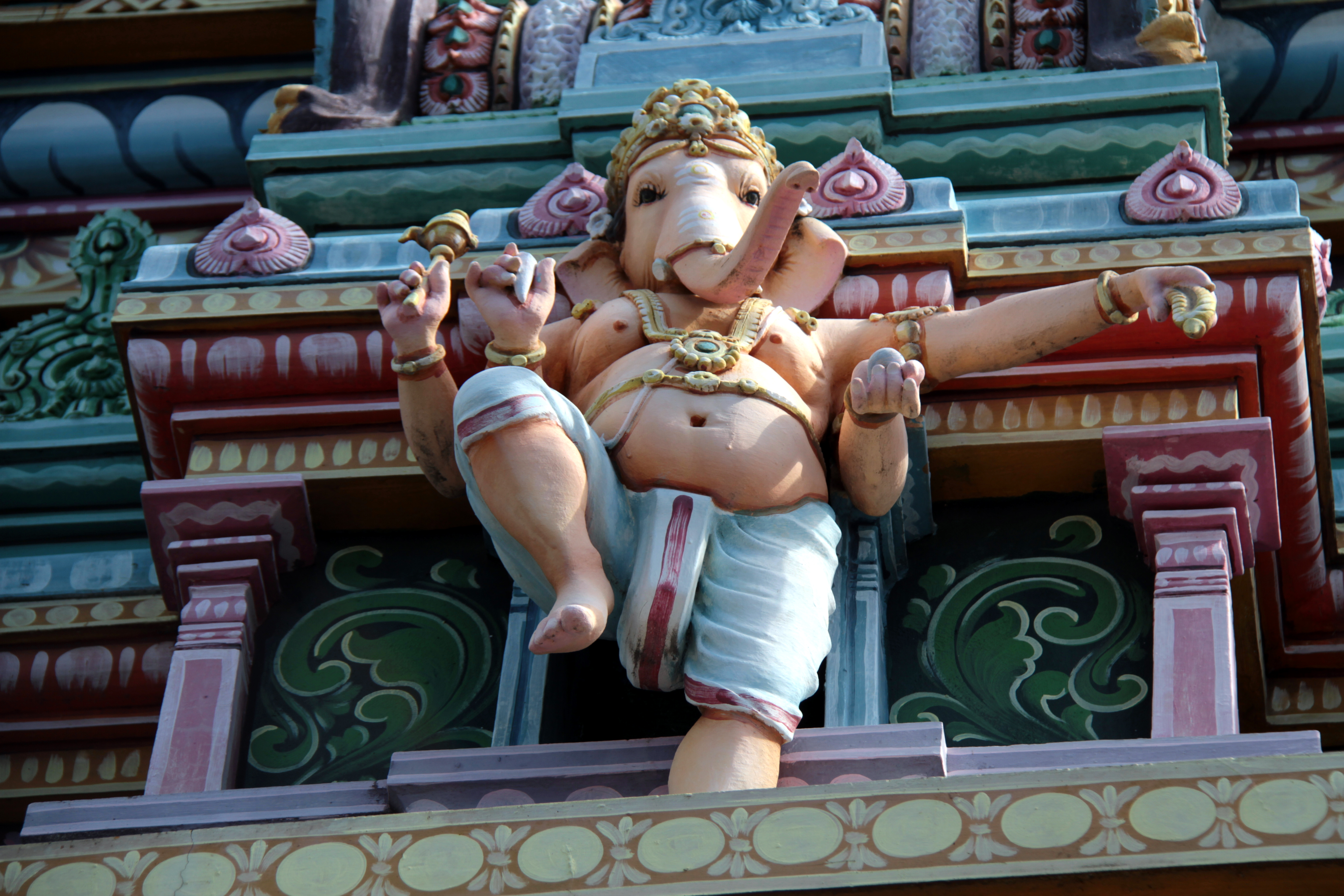
Ganesha

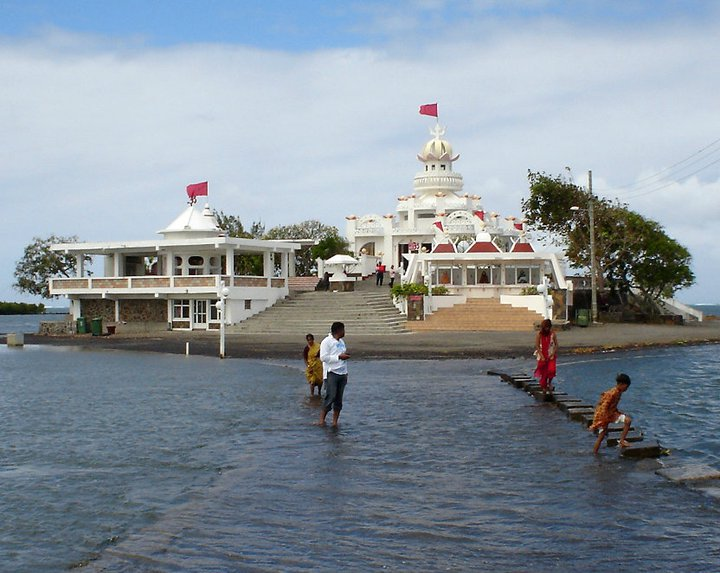
Sagar Shiv Mandir, Poste de Flacq

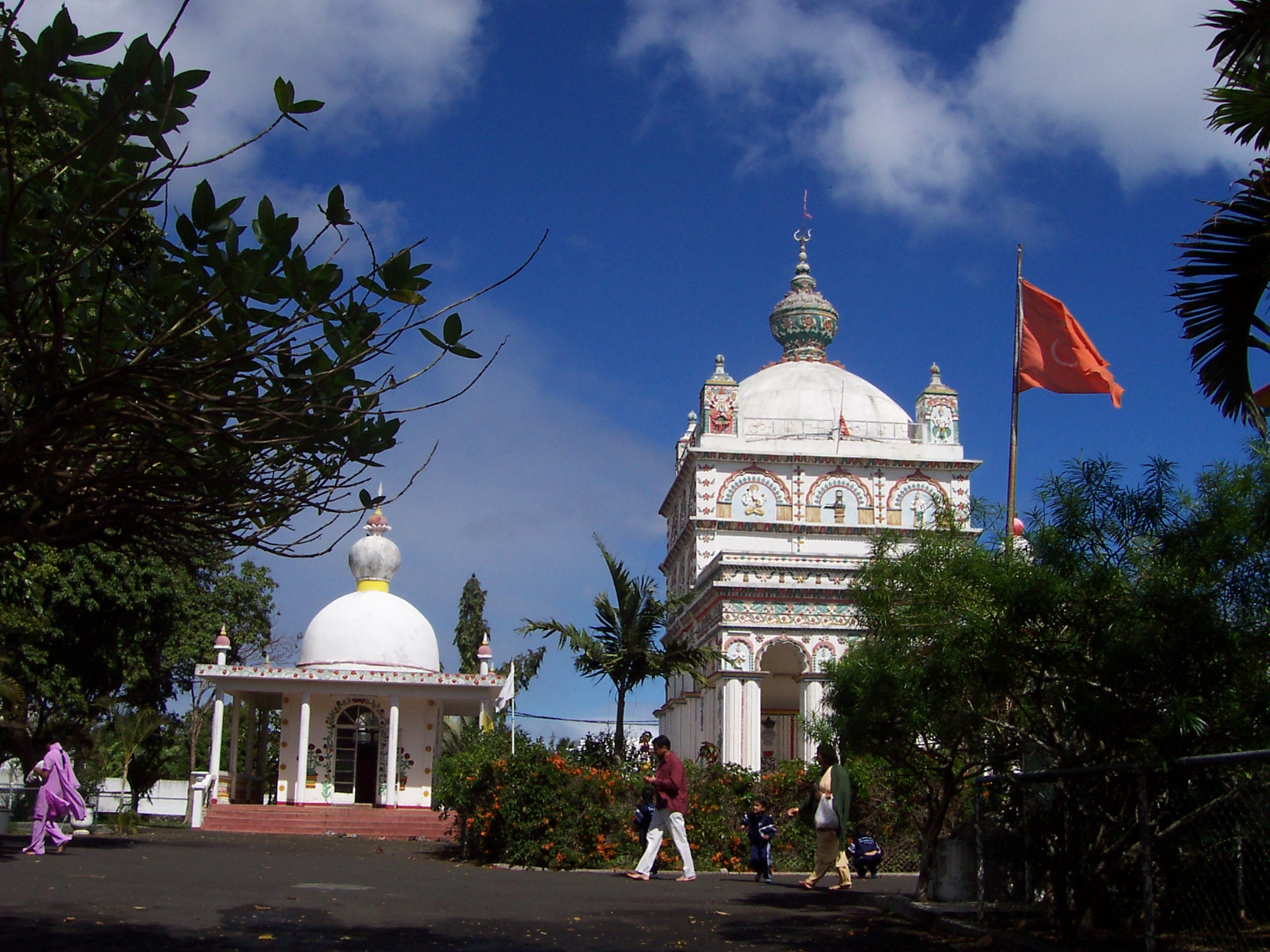
Maheswarnath Mandir, Triolet

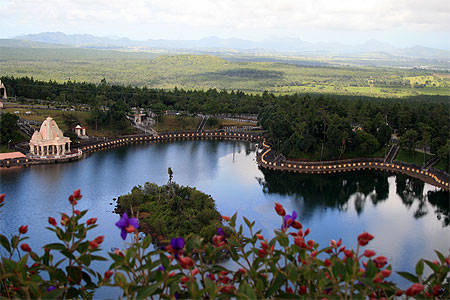
Temple at Ganga Talao's Grand Bassin

== See also ==
- Hinduism in Africa
- Buddhism in Africa
- Religion in Mauritius
- Islam in Mauritius
- Christianity in Mauritius
- History of the Jews in Mauritius
- Demographics of Mauritius
- Hindu eschatology
