= Religion in Mauritius =

Religion in Mauritius (2022 census)
1. Hinduism (47.9%)
2. Christianity (32.3%)
3. Islam (18.2%)
4. No Religion (0.63%)
5. Other/Not stated (0.97%)

Statue of Hindu Goddess Durga at Ganga Talao.

Mauritius is a religiously diverse nation with Hinduism being the largest faith. According to the 2022 census conducted by Statistics Mauritius, 47.9% of the Mauritian population follows Hinduism, followed by 32.3% adherents of Christianity (including Roman Catholicism and Protestantism). Islam is the third-largest religion with 18.2% followers while other religions are also present in a minority.

People of Indian descent (Indo-Mauritian) follow mostly Hinduism. The Franco-Mauritians, Creoles and Sino-Mauritians follow Christianity. A minority of Sino-Mauritians also follow Buddhism and other Chinese-related religions.

== Census results ==
Census Data - Religion
	Hinduism	Christianity	Islam	No Religion	Other/NA
2000	49.64%	31.05%	16.65%	0.42%	2.25%
2011	48.54%	32.71%	17.30%	0.71%	0.74%
2022	47.87%	32.29%	18.24%	0.63%	0.97%
20 Year Change	−1.77%	+1.24%	+1.59%	+0.21%	−1.28%

== Legal status ==
The constitution prohibits discrimination on religious grounds and provides for freedom to practice or change one's religion. The government provides money to the Catholic Church, Church of England, Presbyterian Church of Mauritius, Seventh-day Adventists, Hindus, and Muslims according to their numbers in the census in addition to tax-exempt status. Other religious groups can register and be tax-exempt but receive no subsidy. Religious public holidays are the Hindu festivals of Maha Shivaratree, Ougadi, Thaipoosam Cavadee, Ganesh Chaturthi, and Diwali; the Christian festivals of Assumption and Christmas; and the Muslim festival of Eid al-Fitr.

== Dharmic religions ==
=== Hinduism ===
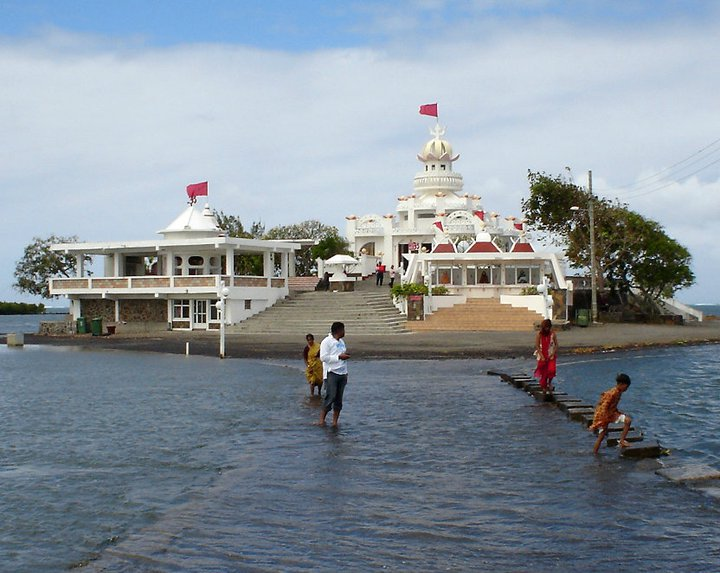
Sagar Shiv Mandir

Hinduism originally came to Mauritius mainly through Indians who worked as indentured labourers on the island following the abolition of slavery. Today, Hinduism is a major religion in Mauritius, representing 47.81% of the total population of the country according to the 2022 census carried out by Statistics Mauritius. This makes Mauritius the country having the highest percentage of Hindus in Africa and third highest percentage of Hindus in the world after Nepal and India, respectively.

One of the biggest festivals on the island is "Maha Shivaratri", or the Great Night of Shiva. During this annual Hindu celebration, which takes place in the months of February and March, four to nine days of ceremony and fasting lead up to an all-night vigil of Shiva's and Ganesha's worship.

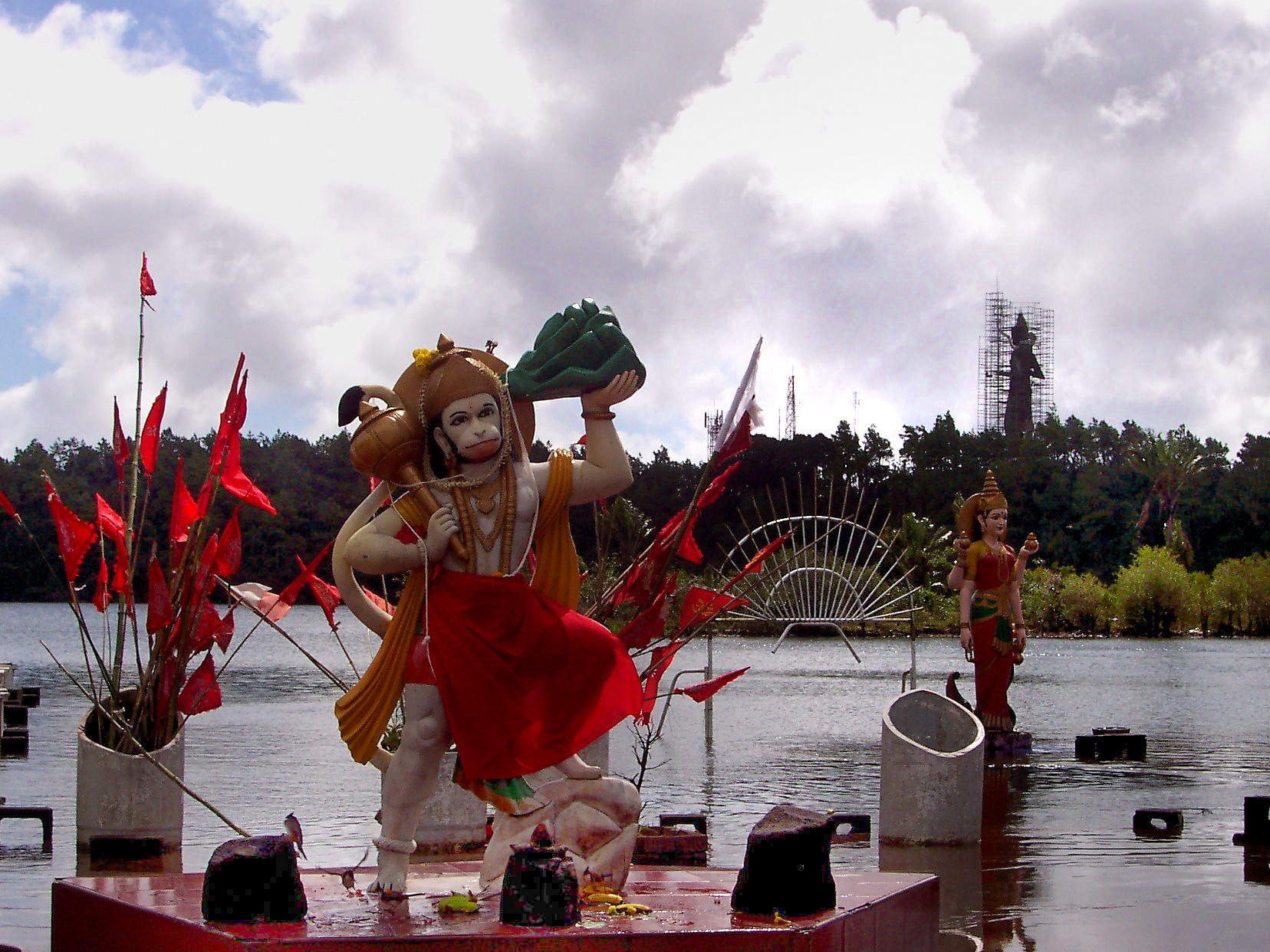
Hanuman, Ganga and Shiva statue under construction in the background at Ganga Talao.

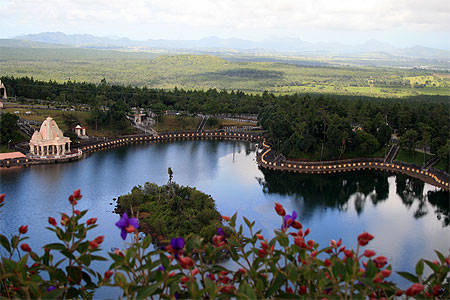
Temple at Ganga Talao's Grand Bassin

=== Buddhism ===
About 0.4% of the population of Mauritius adheres to Buddhism. It is practiced by a significant minority of Sino-Mauritians.

== Abrahamic religions ==
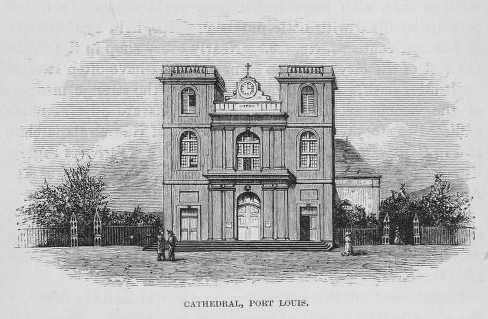
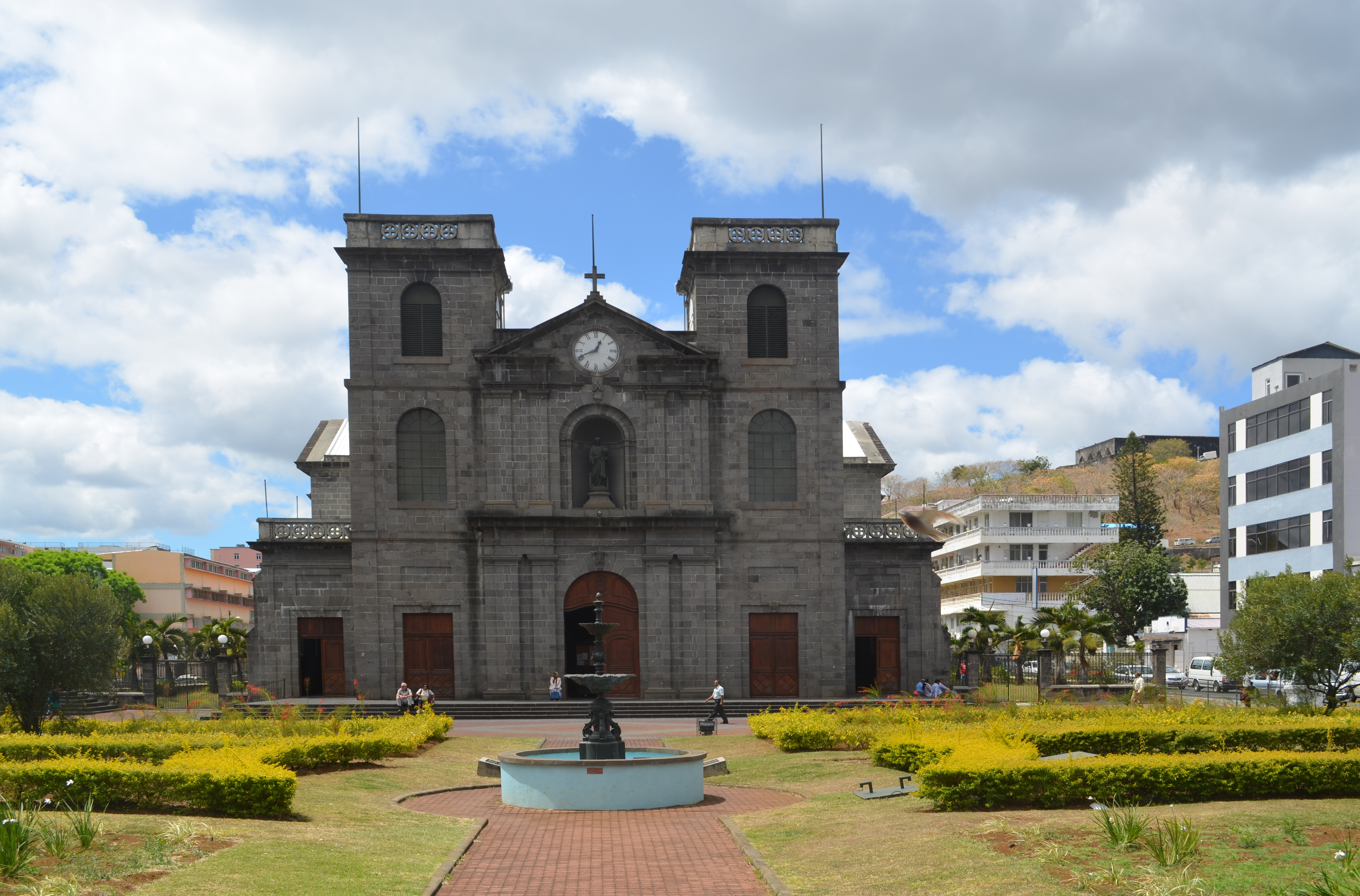
Old and new images of St. Louis Cathedral, Port-Louis

=== Christianity ===
Christianity came to Mauritius with the first inhabitants, the Dutch. However, the Dutch abandoned the island in 1710. The French brought Christianity again when they arrived in 1715. From 1723, there was a law whereby all slaves coming to the island must be baptised Catholic. This law does not seem to have been strictly adhered to. After they had taken Mauritius from the French during the Napoleonic Wars, the British tried to turn Mauritius Protestant during the 1840s and 1850s.

Franco-Mauritians, usually having the same religion and denomination as the Creoles, have sometimes emphasised their differences from the Creoles by practising more traditionally, for instance celebrating Mass in Latin. By 2011 Christianity was practiced by 31.7% of the total population.

==== 2011 census results for Christianity ====
Catholics made up 83% of Mauritius's Christians (26% of the total population or 324,811 people) in 2011. The other recognized and subsidized religions included the Church of England which on the island is the Diocese of Mauritius in the Church of the Province of the Indian Ocean which has 2,788 members according to the census; the Presbyterian Church of Mauritius with 501 members, and the Seventh-day Adventists with 4,428 members. Other Christian denominations included three Pentecostal groups Assembly of God with 8,692, Mission Salut et Guérison with 3,731, and Pentecotiste Church with 6,817. Jehovah's Witnesses had 2,173 members. About 47,774 people simply listed 'Christian' on the census. The Church of Jesus Christ of Latter-day Saints reports 576 members in 3 branches in 2025; the 2022 census reported 10.

=== Islam ===
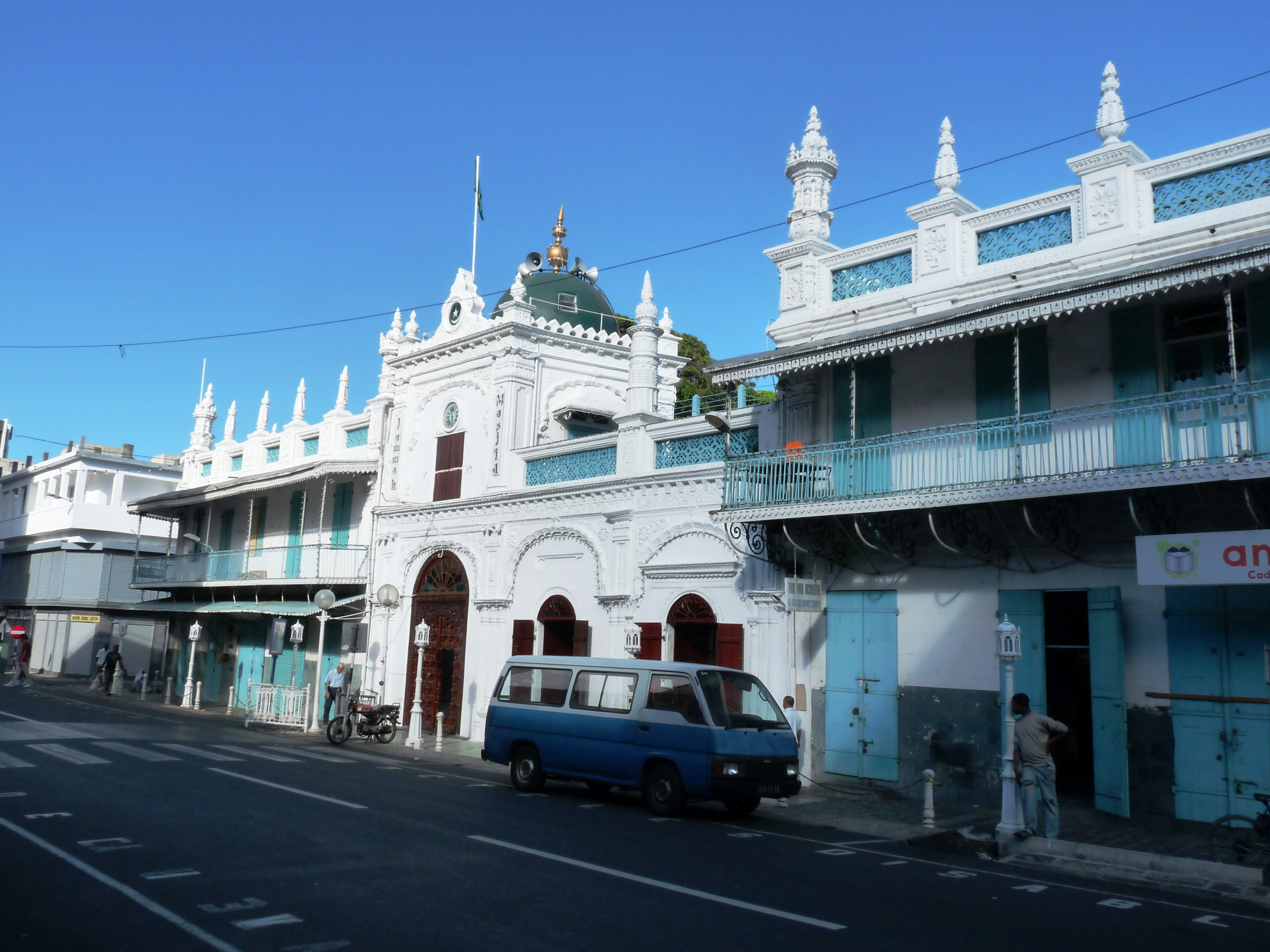
Jummah Mosque, Port Louis

Islam is practiced by 17.3% of the Mauritian population. Approximately 95 percent of these are Sunni Muslims, having an understanding of the Urdu language. Within the Muslim community, there are three distinct ethnicities that exist, notably the Memons and the Surtees (who are rich merchants who came from Kutch and Surat province of Gujarat in India), then the "Calcuttiyas" who came to Mauritius as indentured labourers from Bihar.

Other languages include Bhojpuri, Gujarati, and Tamil.

Among the Shi'a minority, some have their origins in different parts of South Asia, while others are adherents of the Shia Ismaili sect from East Africa. The majority of Shias are Ithnā‘ashariyyah with small Ismaili sect. According to the 2011 census, there were 1265 Ahmadis.

The first purpose-built mosque in Mauritius is the Camp des Lascars Mosque in around 1805. It is now officially known as the Al-Aqsa Mosque. The Jummah Mosque in Port Louis was built in the 1850s and is often described as one of the most beautiful religious building in Mauritius by the Ministry of Tourism's guide. There are many smaller mosques in the towns and villages. The highest concentration of Muslims is found in the capital Port Louis, predominantly in the Plaine Verte, Ward IV, Valle Pitot and Camp Yoloff neighborhood.

=== Baháʼí Faith ===
The Baháʼí Faith was introduced to the Mauritius by Ottilie Rhein in 1953. For opening a new territory to the Faith during the Ten Year Crusade, Ottilie Rhein was designated a Knight of Bahá'u'lláh by Shoghi Effendi, the Guardian of the Baháʼí Faith. According to the 2011 government census, there were 639 Baháʼís in Mauritius.

== Others ==
Taoism and Confucianism are also practiced by small numbers of both Chinese people and Japanese people in Mauritius. Punjabis are a subgroup of Indo-Mauritians who mainly practice Sikhism. In 2011 census, there were only 43 Jews practicing Judaism in Mauritius. By 2022, it was reported that there were almost 100 Jews in the country.

== Freedom of religion ==
In 2023 the country was scored 4 out of 4 for religious freedom.

== See also ==
- Mauritius
- Christianity in Mauritius
- Islam in Mauritius
- Hinduism in Mauritius
- History of the Jews in Mauritius
