= Demographics of Mauritius =

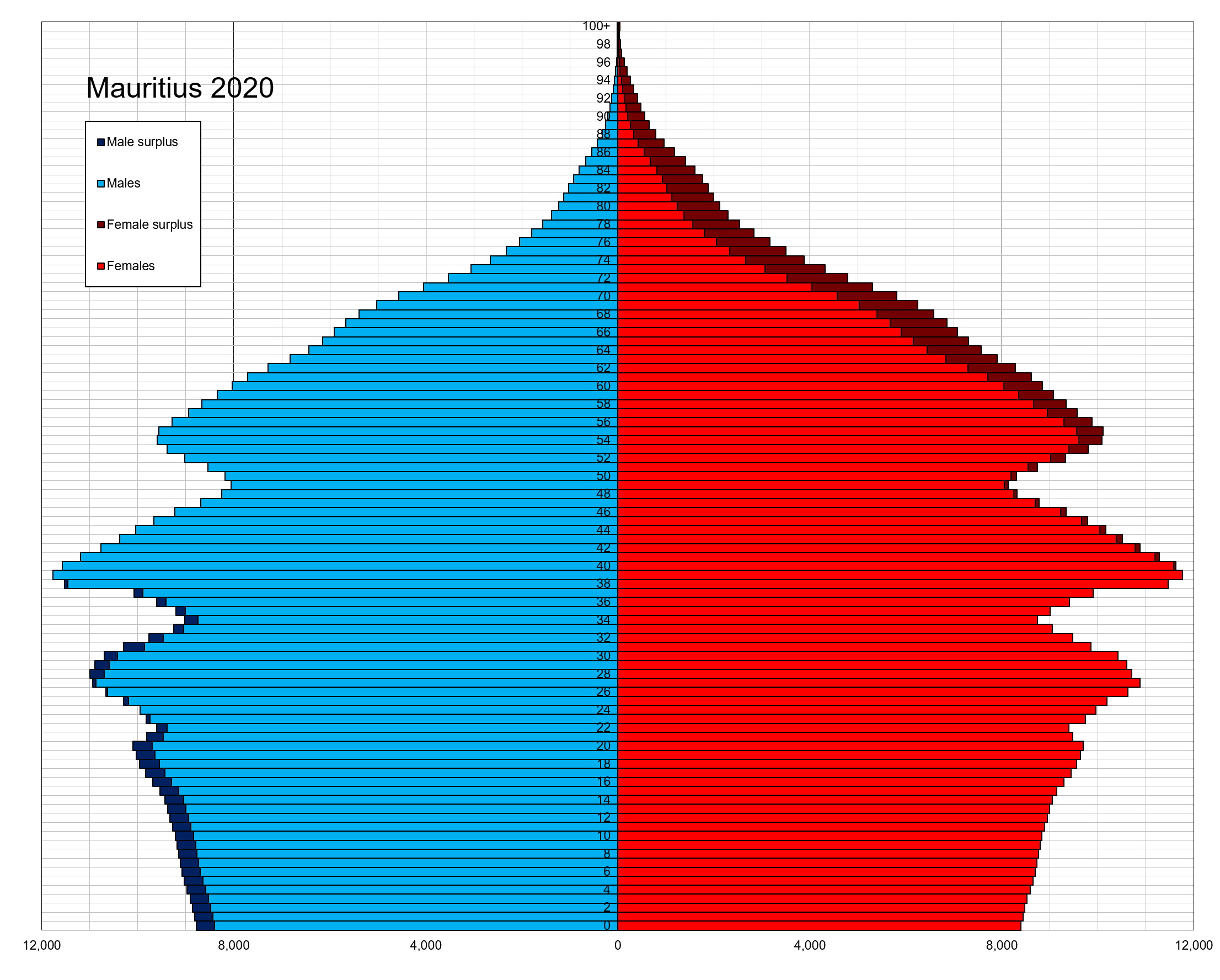
- Population pyramid of Mauritius in 2020
- Population: 1,308,222 (2022 est.)
- Density: 640 inhabitants per km² (2023)
- Growth rate: 0.1% (2022 est.)
- Birth rate: 9.86 births/1,000 population (2022 est.)
- Death rate: 8.86 deaths/1,000 population (2022 est.)
- Life expectancy: 74.86 years
  - male: 72.04 years
  - female: 77.88 years
- Fertility rate: 1.35 children born/woman (2022 est.)
- Infant mortality: 12.08 deaths/1,000 live births
- Net migration rate: 0 migrant(s)/1,000 population (2022 est.)

Age structure
- 0–14 years: 15.4%
- 65 and over: 11.08%

Nationality
- Nationality: Mauritian

The Mauritian society is multiethnic. Indo-Mauritians make up the bulk of the population with the rest being descendants of people from Subsaharan Africa, including Madagascar, China and Western Europe, mostly France.

Mauritius also hosts foreign nationals from mostly India, Bangladesh and France with the rest from South Africa, Madagascar and Subsaharan Africa. As of 2023, Mauritius had the highest population density in Africa.

== Population ==
Over 300k Indians migrated to the Mauritius between 1800 and 1920.

According to the 2022 revision of the World Population Prospects, the total population was 1,298,915 in 2021, compared to 479,000 in 1950.

The proportion of the population aged under 15 was 21.9% in 2010. 71.2% were between 15 and 65 years of age, with 6.9% being 65 years or older.

=== 2022 census ===
Mauritius has a population of 1,235,260 (608,090 males, 627,170 females), according to the 2022 census. The population on the island of Mauritius was 1,191,280 (586,590 males and 604,690 females); Rodrigues island was 43,650 (21,330 males and 22,320 females); and Agaléga island was 330 (170 males and 160 females).

The average age of the population was 38 years; the proportion of children aged under 15 years decreased from 20.7% (in 2011) to 15.4% (in 2022); and the number of adults aged 60 years and over increased from 12.7% (2011) to 18.7% (2022).

View source data.
View source data.
View source data.

=== Structure of the population ===
==== UN estimates ====
	Total population	Population aged 0–14 (%)	Population aged 15–64 (%)	Population aged 65+ (%)
1950	479 000	45.2	51.9	3.0
1955	570 000	46.1	51.3	2.6
1960	662 000	46.6	50.9	2.5
1965	754 000	46.2	51.3	2.5
1970	828 000	43.8	53.6	2.6
1975	891 000	39.9	57.3	2.8
1980	966 000	35.4	61.0	3.6
1985	1 021 000	31.4	64.5	4.1
1990	1 059 000	29.7	65.8	4.5
1995	1 122 000	27.8	67.2	5.0
2000	1 187 000	26.7	67.6	5.7
2005	1 243 000	24.8	69.1	6.1
2010	1 281 000	21.9	71.2	6.9

==== 2012 estimates ====
Population Estimates by sex and age group (01.VII.2012) (Based on the results of the 2011 Population Census.) :

Age group	Male	Female	Total	%
Total	621 297	634 585	1,255,882	100
0–4	38 379	37 772	76 151	6.06
5–9	46 802	45 130	91 932	7.32
10–14	49 926	48 044	97 970	7.80
15–19	50 158	49 996	100 154	7.97
20–24	48 747	47 374	96 121	7.65
25–29	43 794	43 392	87 186	6.94
30–34	52 325	51 550	103 875	8.27
35–39	45 447	44 448	89 895	7.16
40–44	43 961	43 150	87 111	6.94
45–49	49 134	48 570	97 704	7.78
50–54	43 718	44 514	88 232	7.03
55–59	37 174	38 625	75 799	6.04
60–64	28 929	31 946	60 875	4.85
65–69	16 986	20 842	37 828	3.01
70–74	11 099	14 471	25 570	2.04
75–79	7 761	11 311	19 072	1.52
80–84	4 077	7 033	11 110	0.88
85+	2 880	6 417	9 297	0.74
Age group	Male	Female	Total	Percent
0–14	135 107	130 946	266 053	21.18
15–64	443 387	443 565	886 952	70.62
65+	42 803	60 074	102 877	8.19

==== Census 2019 ====
Population by sex and age group (Census 04.VII.2019) (Excludes the islands of St. Brandon and Agalega.):

Age group	Male	Female	Total	%
Total	610 848	625 969	1,236,817	100
0–4	36 702	36 376	73 078	5.91
5–9	44 947	44 068	89 015	7.20
10–14	47 302	46 337	93 639	7.57
15–19	50 715	50 293	101 008	8.17
20–24	46 871	45 800	92 671	7.49
25–29	45 589	45 348	90 937	7.35
30–34	52 182	51 247	103 429	8.36
35–39	44 241	43 556	87 797	7.10
40–44	45 150	44 236	89 386	7.23
45–49	49 800	49 541	99 341	8.03
50–54	42 996	43 341	86 337	6.98
55–59	35 713	37 341	73 054	5.91
60–64	27 143	30 199	57 342	4.64
65–69	15 846	19 593	35 439	2.87
70–74	10 986	14 389	25 375	2.05
75–79	7 349	10 695	18 044	1.46
80–84	4 176	7 193	11 369	0.92
85–89	2 135	4 233	6 368	0.51
90–94	512	1 470	1 982	0.16
95–99	107	384	491	0.04
100+	13	83	96	0.01
Age group	Male	Female	Total	Percent
0–14	128 951	126 781	255 732	20.68
15–64	440 400	440 902	881 302	71.26
65+	41 124	58 040	99 164	8.02
unknown	373	246	619	0.05

== Vital statistics ==
The table below presents the population development of Mauritius since 1900. The figures up to 1945 are for the island of Mauritius only. As of 1946, the island of Rodrigues is included.

Figures are from Statistics Mauritius and United Nations Demographic Yearbook.

	Average population	Live births	Deaths	Natural change	Crude birth rate (per 1000)	Crude death rate (per 1000)	Natural change (per 1000)	TFR
1900	371,000	14,490	13,695	795	38.6	36.5	2.1	
1901	371,000	12,910	14,970	-2,060	34.8	40.4	-5.6	
1902	371,000	13,495	12,716	779	35.9	33.8	2.1	
1903	371,000	13,611	15,034	-1,423	36.3	40.1	-3.8	
1904	371,000	14,103	12,064	2,039	37.2	31.9	5.3	
1905	370,000	14,043	15,379	-1,336	37.2	40.7	-3.5	
1906	370,000	12,669	15,124	-2,455	33.6	40.0	-6.4	
1907	370,000	14,186	13,037	1,149	37.7	34.6	3.1	
1908	370,000	13,456	15,094	-1,638	36.0	40.3	-4.3	
1909	369,000	12,837	13,761	– 924	34.4	36.9	-2.5	
1910	369,000	13,329	12,488	841	36.1	33.8	2.3	
1911	369,000	14,585	12,204	2,381	39.2	32.8	6.4	
1912	370,000	13,209	14,429	-1,220	35.5	38.8	-3.3	
1913	371,000	15,153	13,201	1,952	40.8	35.5	5.3	
1914	372,000	15,229	12,134	3,095	40.8	32.5	8.3	
1915	373,000	13,094	13,101	– 7	34.8	34.8	-0.0	
1916	374,000	13,162	11,432	1,730	35.0	30.4	4.6	
1917	375,000	13,887	12,234	1,653	36.9	32.5	4.4	
1918	375,000	13,109	12,794	315	34.8	33.9	0.9	
1919	375,000	13,261	24,455	-11,194	35.2	64.9	-29.7	
1920	376,000	12,791	11,773	1,018	35.1	32.3	2.8	
1921	376,000	14,360	15,159	– 799	38.1	40.3	-2.2	
1922	376,000	13,955	12,967	988	37.0	34.5	2.5	
1923	377,000	13,879	10,778	3,101	36.8	28.5	8.3	
1924	380,000	15,430	10,558	4,872	41.1	28.1	13.0	
1925	383,000	16,545	9,327	7,218	42.6	24.9	17.7	
1926	386,000	15,520	9,958	5,562	39.4	25.3	14.1	
1927	389,000	13,748	10,015	3,733	34.5	25.1	9.4	
1928	391,000	15,206	11,342	3,864	37.9	28.2	9.7	
1929	393,000	13,771	12,413	1,358	34.0	30.7	3.3	
1930	393,000	12,793	14,341	-1,548	31.6	35.4	-3.8	
1931	393,000	11,941	15,467	-3,526	29.7	38.4	-8.7	
1932	390,000	10,266	12,848	-2,582	25.7	32.2	-6.5	
1933	390,000	13,479	10,615	2,864	33.8	26.6	7.2	
1934	392,000	13,516	10,069	3,447	33.7	25.1	8.6	
1935	394,000	13,246	10,445	2,801	32.8	25.8	7.0	
1936	398,000	13,867	10,500	3,367	34.1	25.8	8.3	
1937	400,000	14,097	11,527	2,570	34.4	28.1	6.3	
1938	402,000	13,420	12,046	1,374	32.6	29.2	3.4	
1939	405,000	14,578	11,340	3,238	35.2	27.4	7.8	
1940	407,000	12,145	10,373	1,772	29.1	24.9	4.2	
1941	407,000	13,430	10,436	2,994	32.2	25.0	7.2	
1942	408,000	13,553	11,927	1,626	32.5	28.6	3.9	
1943	410,000	13,604	10,642	2,962	32.6	25.5	7.1	
1944	419,000	18,258	11,355	6,903	43.4	27.0	16.4	
1945	424,000	16,290	15,277	1,013	38.4	36.0	2.4	
1946	437,000	16,939	12,678	4,261	38.8	29.0	9.8	
1947	445,000	19,458	8,830	10,628	43.7	19.8	23.9	
1948	455,000	19,429	10,680	8,749	42.7	23.5	19.2	
1949	458,000	20,931	7,523	13,408	45.7	16.4	29.3	
1950	479,000	23,667	6,611	17,056	49.4	13.8	35.6	
1951	498,000	23,543	7,305	16,238	47.3	14.7	32.6	
1952	514,000	24,689	7,569	17,120	48.0	14.7	33.3	
1953	537,000	24,428	8,550	15,878	45.5	15.9	29.6	
1954	551,000	22,513	8,587	13,926	40.9	15.6	25.3	
1955	570,000	23,612	7,260	16,352	41.4	12.7	28.7	
1956	591,000	25,666	6,910	18,756	43.4	11.7	31.7	
1957	609,000	26,055	7,823	18,232	42.8	12.8	29.9	
1958	627,000	25,398	7,307	18,091	40.5	11.7	28.9	
1959	644,000	24,792	7,040	17,752	38.5	10.9	27.6	
1960	662,000	26,017	7,588	18,429	39.3	11.5	27.8	
1961	680,000	27,028	6,697	20,331	39.7	9.8	29.9	
1962	700,000	27,162	6,485	20,677	38.8	9.3	29.5	
1963	715,000	28,859	6,912	21,947	40.4	9.7	30.7	
1964	735,000	28,610	6,421	22,189	38.9	8.7	30.2	
1965	754,000	27,195	6,637	20,558	36.1	8.8	27.3	
1966	773,000	27,831	6,944	20,887	36.0	9.0	27.0	
1967	789,000	24,471	6,750	17,721	31.0	8.6	22.5	
1968	804,000	25,409	7,382	18,027	31.6	9.2	22.4	
1969	815,000	22,621	6,733	15,888	27.7	8.3	19.5	
1970	828,000	22,765	6,520	16,245	27.5	7.9	19.6	
1971	841,000	21,926	6,436	15,490	26.1	7.7	18.4	
1972	850,968	21,495	6,753	14,742	25.3	7.9	17.3	
1973	869,334	20,015	6,779	13,236	23.0	7.8	15.2	
1974	880,650	24,002	6,424	17,578	27.3	7.3	20.0	
1975	892,045	22,557	7,201	15,356	25.3	8.1	17.2	3.19
1976	903,610	23,274	6,968	16,306	25.8	7.7	18.0	3.13
1977	918,005	23,859	7,154	16,705	26.0	7.8	18.2	3.04
1978	933,499	25,278	6,596	18,682	27.1	7.1	20.0	3.09
1979	949,888	26,163	6,871	19,292	27.6	7.2	20.3	3.07
1980	966,039	26,294	6,919	19,375	27.2	7.2	20.1	3.19
1981	980,462	24,967	6,653	18,314	25.5	6.8	18.7	2.68
1982	992,521	22,459	6,584	15,875	22.6	6.6	16.0	2.39
1983	1,001,691	21,073	6,532	14,541	21.0	6.5	14.5	2.23
1984	1,012,221	20,332	6,646	13,686	20.1	6.6	13.5	2.16
1985	1,020,528	19,376	6,906	12,470	19.0	6.8	12.2	2.02
1986	1,028,360	19,170	6,805	12,365	18.6	6.6	12.0	1.99
1987	1,036,082	20,033	6,753	13,280	19.3	6.5	12.8	2.05
1988	1,043,239	20,941	6,879	14,062	20.1	6.6	13.5	2.14
1989	1,051,260	21,822	7,149	14,673	20.8	6.8	14.0	2.23
1990	1,058,775	22,602	7,031	15,571	21.3	6.6	14.7	2.32
1991	1,070,266	22,197	7,027	15,170	20.7	6.6	14.2	2.30
1992	1,084,441	22,902	7,023	15,879	21.1	6.5	14.6	2.37
1993	1,097,374	22,329	7,433	14,896	20.3	6.8	13.6	2.31
1994	1,112,846	21,795	7,402	14,393	19.6	6.7	12.9	2.25
1995	1,122,457	20,549	7,465	13,084	18.3	6.7	11.7	2.14
1996	1,133,996	20,763	7,670	13,093	18.3	6.8	11.5	2.12
1997	1,148,284	20,012	7,986	12,026	17.4	7.0	10.5	2.04
1998	1,160,421	19,434	7,839	11,595	16.8	6.8	10.0	1.97
1999	1,175,267	20,311	7,944	12,367	17.3	6.8	10.5	2.05
2000	1,186,873	20,205	7,982	12,223	17.0	6.7	10.3	1.99
2001	1,196,287	19,696	7,983	11,713	16.4	6.7	9.8	1.93
2002	1,204,621	19,983	8,310	11,673	16.5	6.9	9.6	1.96
2003	1,213,370	19,343	8,520	10,823	15.8	7.0	8.8	1.91
2004	1,221,003	19,230	8,475	10,755	15.6	6.9	8.7	1.92
2005	1,228,254	18,820	8,646	10,174	15.1	7.0	8.2	1.88
2006	1,233,996	17,604	9,162	8,442	14.0	7.3	6.7	1.77
2007	1,239,630	17,034	8,498	8,536	13.5	6.7	6.8	1.74
2008	1,244,121	16,372	9,004	7,368	12.9	7.1	5.8	1.67
2009	1,247,429	15,344	9,224	6,120	12.0	7.2	4.8	1.59
2010	1,250,400	15,005	9,131	5,874	11.7	7.1	4.6	1.57
2011	1,252,404	14,701	9,170	5,531	11.7	7.3	4.4	1.55
2012	1,251,602	14,502	9,343	5,159	11.5	7.4	4.1	1.56
2013	1,253,708	13,688	9,440	4,248	10.9	7.5	3.4	1.45
2014	1,255,126	13,283	9,682	3,601	10.5	7.7	2.8	1.44
2015	1,256,135	12,738	9,747	2,991	10.1	7.7	2.4	1.37
2016	1,256,340	12,948	10,174	2,774	10.2	8.1	2.1	1.41
2017	1,256,816	13,385	10,140	3,245	10.6	8.0	2.6	1.46
2018	1,256,843	12,980	10,787	2,193	10.3	8.5	1.8	1.42
2019	1,256,589	12,862	11,174	1,688	10.2	8.8	1.4	1.41
2020	1,255,954	13,465	11,060	2,405	10.6	8.7	1.9	1.46
2021	1,255,609	12,982	13,274	-292	10.3	10.5	-0.2	1.42
2022	1,251,135	12,096	12,938	-842	9.6	10.2	-0.6	1.33
2023	1,248,317	12,872	11,839	1,033	10.3	9.5	0.8	1.40
2024	1,245,449	12,853	12,507	346	10.3	10.0	0.3	1.44
2025	1,243,741	13,250	12,685	565	10.7	10.2	0.5	

=== Current vital statistics ===
Period	Live births	Deaths	Natural change
2023	12,872	11,839	+1033
2024	12,853	12,507	+346
Difference	▼ -19 (-0.1%)	▲ +668 (+5.64%)	▼ -687

=== Life expectancy ===
Period	Life expectancy in Years
1950–1955	50.19
1955–1960	▲55.74
1960–1965	▲61.23
1965–1970	▲62.96
1970–1975	▲63.55
1975–1980	▲65.58
1980–1985	▲68.10
1985–1990	▲68.49
1990–1995	▲70.28
1995–2000	▲70.36
2000–2005	▲72.09
2005–2010	▲72.75
2010–2015	▲74.13

== Ethnic groups ==
Indo-Mauritians represent roughly sixty-eight percent of the population. The Indo-Mauritian population consists of Hindu and Muslim descendants of Indian laborers.

Mauritian Creoles, descendants of African slaves, represent twenty-seven percent of the population. The Creole community also includes the country's mixed-race communities, which consist of people with any admixture of the island's other groups. Rodriguais and Chagossians are usually incorporated within the Creole ethnic group.

Sino-Mauritians from the Hakka and other ethnolinnguistic groups make up around three percent of Mauritian society.

White Mauritians, of mostly French descent, make up roughly two percent of the population of Mauritius.

While the government officially groups Mauritians into four ethnic groups – Hindus, Muslims, Chinese, and General Population – the general population includes all who do not practice Hinduism or Islam and are not Chinese by ethnicity. The general population is mostly made-up of Christian Creole and White Mauritians.

Small groups of foreign students from Europe or the Indian Ocean region are also present. Recent years have seen a steady flow of foreign workers into the textile industry (primarily Bangladeshi men), the construction industry (primarily Indian and Bangladeshi workers), and harbor-related activities.

== Language ==
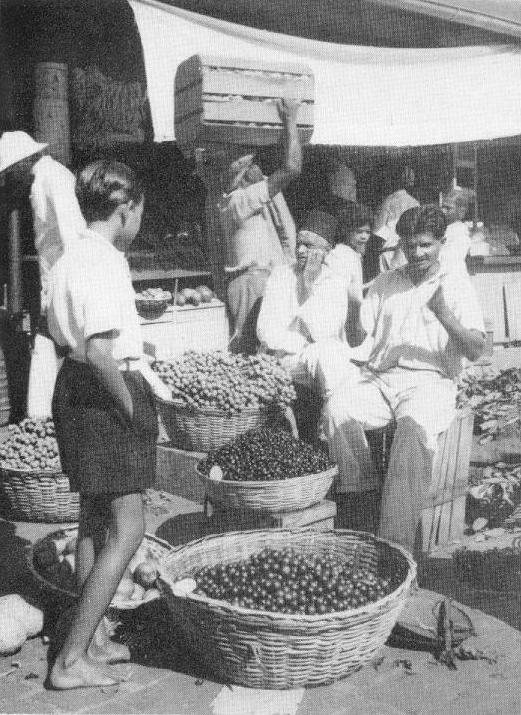
Picture from the 1950s of the Central Market, Port Louis, Mauritius.

The main languages spoken in Mauritius are Mauritian Creole, English, French, and Bhojpuri. English is the official administrative language of the parliament, though French is also permitted. However, the lingua franca is Mauritian Creole, and the newspapers and television programs are usually in French. The Mauritian currency features the Latin, Tamil and Devanagari scripts.

Mauritian Creole, which is spoken by 90 percent of the population, is considered to be the native language of the country and is used most often in informal settings. It was developed in the 18th century by enslaved Africans who used a pidgin language to communicate with each other and with French enslavers and colonizers. The pidgin evolved with later generations to become a casual and main language.

Mauritian Creole is a French-based creole.

== Religion ==
Religion in Mauritius (2022 census)
1. Hinduism (47.9%)
2. Christianity (32.3%)
3. Islam (18.2%)
4. Other (1.00%)
5. None (0.60%)

More than 90% of the Sino-Mauritian community are Christian; the remainder are largely Buddhist.

== Migrants ==
According to the United Nations, there were 28,713 international migrants in Mauritius in 2017.

Their most common countries of origin were as follows:

International migrants in Mauritius in 2017
India	8,689
Bangladesh	8,364
China	2,964
Madagascar	2,287
France	1,511
Sri Lanka	1,131
South Africa	624
Great Britain	456
Pakistan	187
Italy	146
Germany	136
Seychelles	124
Source: United Nations "Migrant Stock by Origin and Destination" (PDF). 2019.
