= Israel–Mauritius relations =

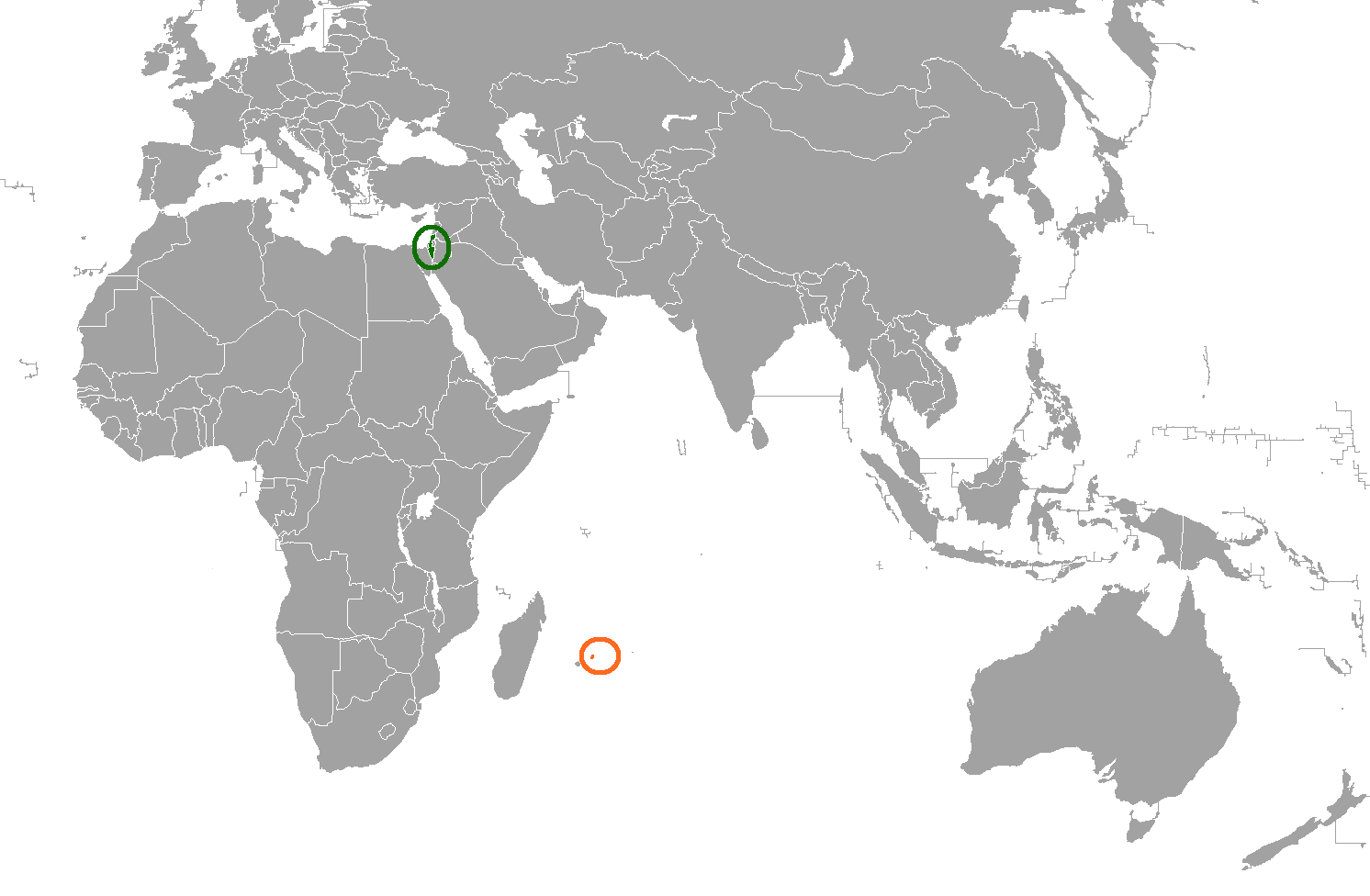
- Israel: Mauritius

Diplomatic mission
- Embassy of Israel, Nairobi: Honorary-Consulate of Mauritius, Tel Aviv

Israel–Mauritius relations are the bilateral relations between the State of Israel and the Republic of Mauritius. The Israeli embassy in Nairobi, Kenya is accredited to Mauritius. Mauritius has an honorary consul in Tel Aviv, Regev Naftali.

== History ==
The relations between the State of Israel and the Republic of Mauritius were officially established in 1968, right after Mauritius gained its independence. Mauritius cut off relations with Israel due to the Boycott of the Sub-Saharan African countries, but re-established them on 30 September 1993.

In a crack-down on illegal immigration during the British Mandates, Jews from throughout Central Europe seeking to immigrate to Palestine were deported to Mauritius. Poor living conditions resulted in 128 deaths. A memorial service was held in May 2001.

The country's first bar mitzvah since World War II was celebrated in 2001.

In 2015, bilateral trade between the countries had a total worth of 5.7 Million US Dollars, mainly Israeli exports to Mauritius. In 2022, Israel imports from Mauritius totaled US$3.36 million.

== See also ==
- Foreign relations of Israel
- History of the Jews in Mauritius
