= General Population (Mauritius) =

Mauritians not considered part of the Hindu, Muslim, or Chinese communities

- (Mauritius)

Regions with significant populations
- Mauritius, Rodrigues

Languages
- Creole

Religion
- Christianity (Catholic majority), Rastafari

Related ethnic groups
- Mauritian Creoles, Franco-Mauritians

General Population (French: Population Générale) on the island of Mauritius refers to the community of inhabitants who belong to the ethnic groups Mauritian Creoles and Franco-Mauritians. Within the General Population, there is a further division based on skin colour and social status. It also includes most of the inhabitants of Rodrigues as well as Chagossians who usually identify as Mauritian Creoles.

According to the Constitution of Mauritius there are 4 distinct communities on the island for representation in the National Assembly. Schedule I, Paragraph 3(4) of the Constitution states that:

The population of Mauritius shall be regarded as including a Hindu community, a Muslim community, and a Sino-Mauritian community, and every person who does not appear, from his way of life, to belong to one or other of those three communities shall be regarded as belonging to the General Population, which shall itself be regarded as a fourth community.

Thus each ethnic group in Mauritius falls within one of the four main communities known as Hindus, General Population, Muslims and Sino-Mauritians.

== Origins ==
In 1829 an Ordinance in Council abolished racial discrimination for free subjects of all ethnic groups on the island. This new law was in preparation for the Abolition of Slavery by the British rulers. As a result the inhabitants could no longer be officially described as "blacks" or "whites". Thus all blacks, coloured and white were grouped as General Population. During the census of 1846 the distinct groups were defined as "General Population", "Ex-apprentices (freed slaves)", and "Indian and other immigrant labourers".

People of Indian origins who embraced Christianity became classified as General Population by 1931. By 1944 the island's population was further divided on religious grounds: Christians in the General Population and Indians into Hindus and Muslims. The People Representation Ordinance of 1958 was introduced by the Secretary of State to ensure representation of the 3 main sections of the population (Hindus, General Population and Muslims) in the legislature in numbers that were proportional to the population as a whole.

== See also ==
- Religion in Mauritius
