= Jummah Mosque (Mauritius) =

Mosque in Port Louis, Mauritius

- مسجد جمعة
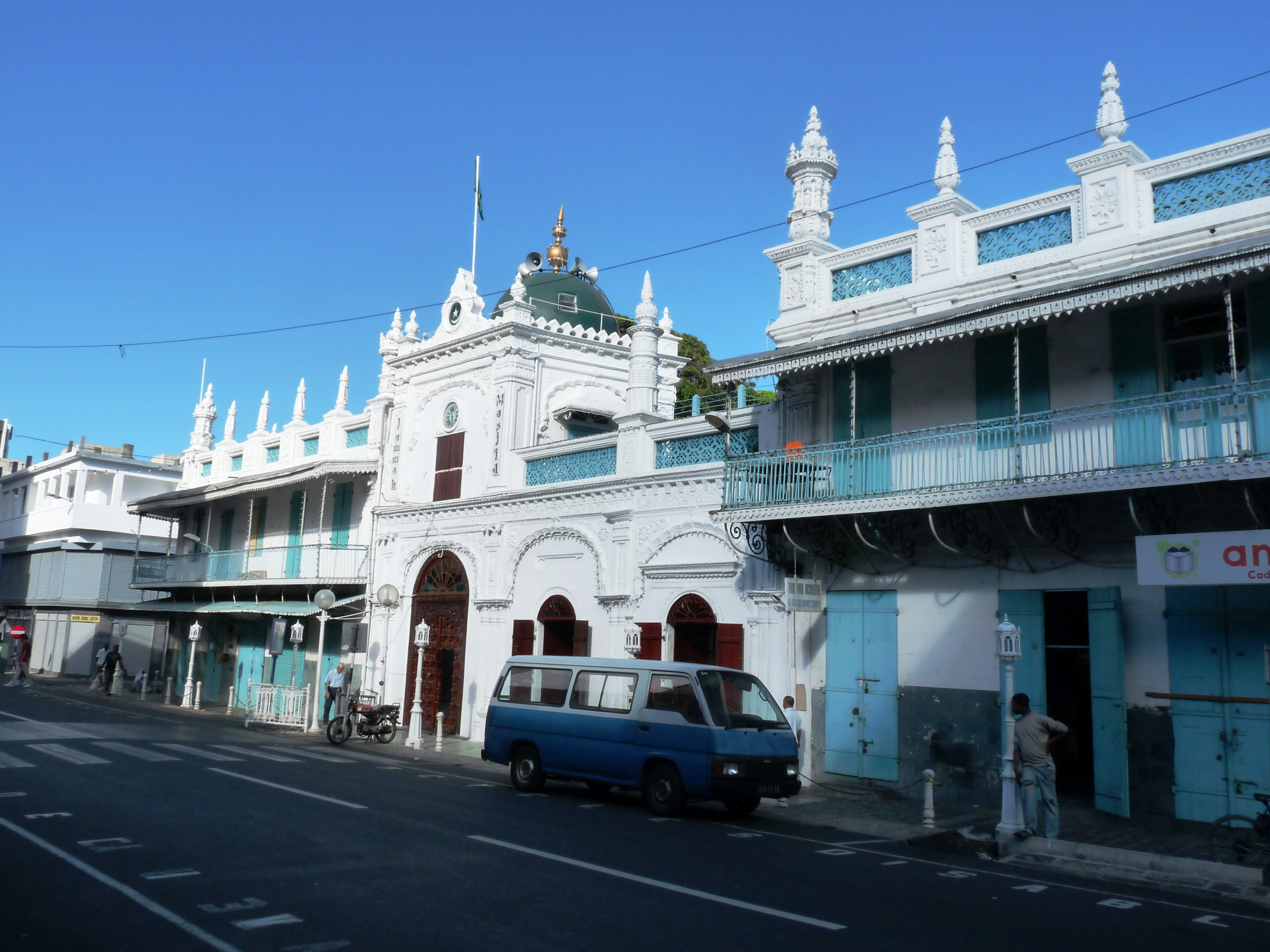

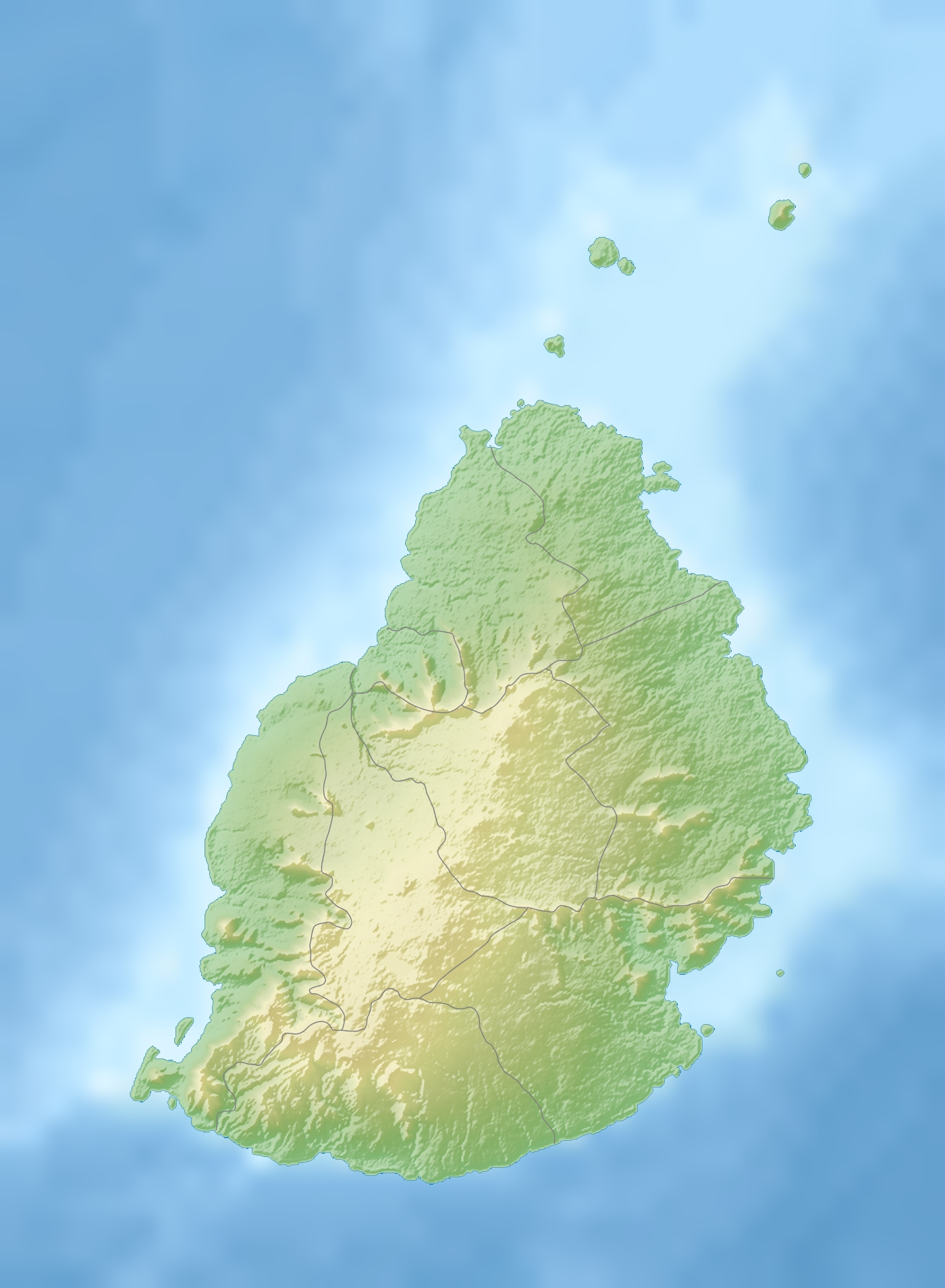
- Location within Mauritius

Religion
- Affiliation: Islam
- Governing body: Cutchi Maiman Society

Location
- Location: Port Louis, Mauritius
- Interactive map of Jummah Mosque
- Coordinates: 20°9′35.5″S 57°30′17.5″E

Architecture
- Type: mosque
- Established: 20 October 1852

Website
- Official website

The Jummah Mosque (Arabic: مسجد جمعة) formerly "Mosque of the Arabs", is a mosque in Port Louis, Mauritius dating from the 1850s. The building combines Indian, Creole and Islamic architecture. The Jummah Mosque houses the remains of Jamal Shah (a pir from Kutch, India) in a marble tomb next to the mosque.

== History ==
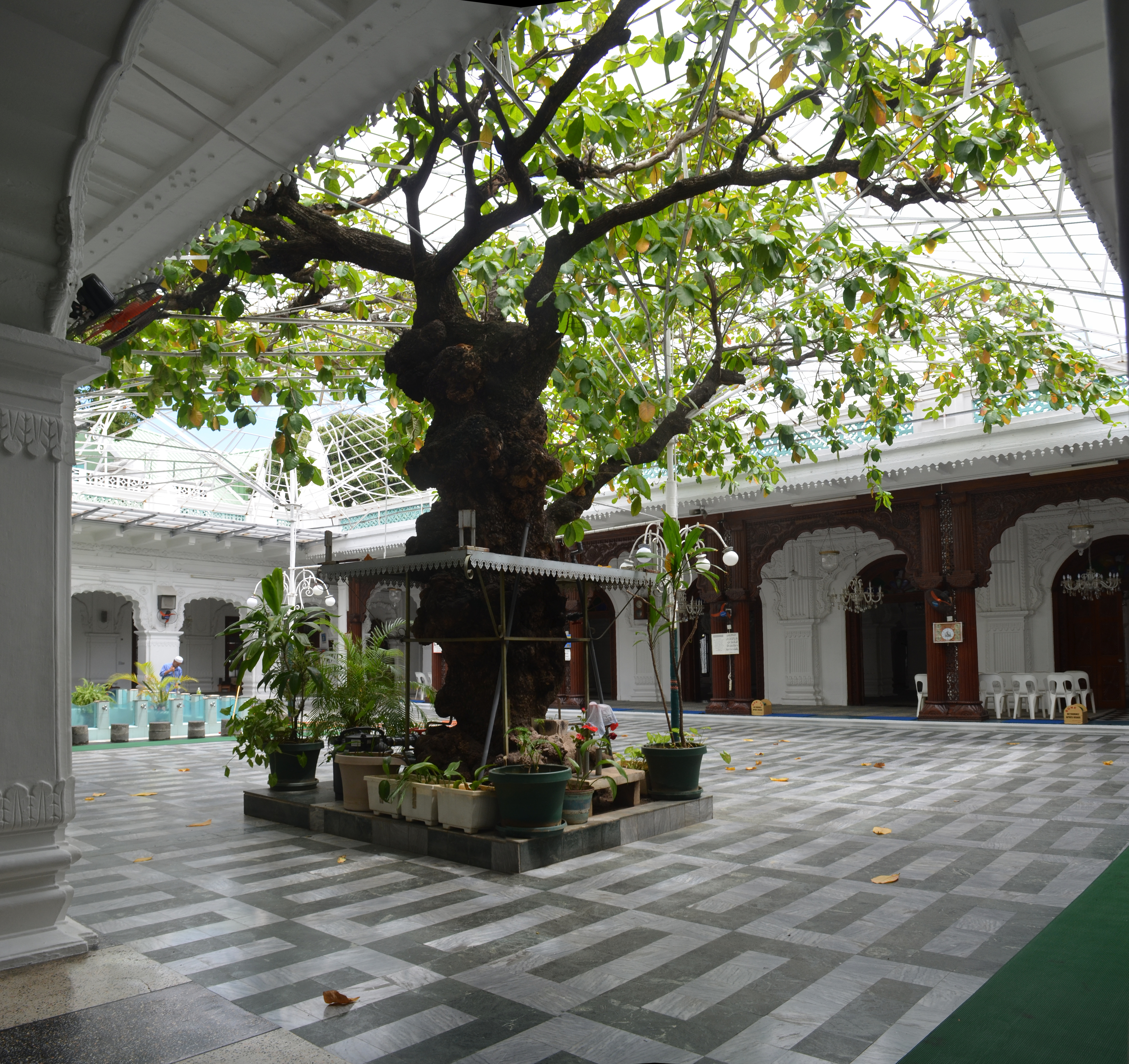
courtyard of the Mosque

In 1852, members of the mercantile community of Port Louis (Joonus Allarakia, Casseem Hemeem, Joosub Satardeenah, Elias Hamode, Abdoollah Essack, Ab doorahim Allanah, Ismael Ibrahim and Omar Yacoob) purchased two properties in Queen Street, Port Louis, for a total of Rs 6,800. The deeds of the purchase, dated October 20, 1852, stipulated, among other things, that the Muslim merchants had made the purchases:

... jointly and severally, in their own names as well as on behalf of the entire Muslim congregation of Mauritius from which they hereby declare having received special powers. The purchasers declare that the sum of money paid for the present purchases does not belong to them personally but to the whole Muslim congregation of Mauritius.

=== Mosque of the Arabs ===
A house on one of the properties was temporarily used as a place of worship, while the mosque was being constructed. Ismael Jeewa led the prayers at the temporary prayer house. In 1853, a small mosque was built and consecrated. Bacosse Sobedar, imam of the Camp des Lascars Mosque, outlined the mihrab (prayer niche) of the new mosque, which came to be known for many years as the Mosquée des Arabes ("Mosque of the Arabs") – after its founders, whom the general public mistook for Arabs. The new mosque, which could accommodate some 200 worshippers, was the original Jummah Mosque.

=== Jummah Mosque ===
The growing Muslim population in Port-Louis was in need of a larger mosque and so between 1857 and 1877, seven different lots around the mosque, amounting to 0.30 hectares (3/4 acre), were successively bought by Muslim merchants for Rs 134,260 and donated to the mosque. Part of the financing came from a two percent tax on grain trade All but one of the deeds of purchase mentioned that the purchases were made on behalf of the whole Muslim community of Mauritius. In the end, the entire block around the mosque —bound by Royal, New Little Mountain (now Joseph Rivière), Queen and Little Mountain (now Jummah Mosque) Streets— became property of the Muslim community.

The expansion works began in 1878 and were overseen by Jackaria Jan Mahomed. Artisans, led by Ishaq Mistry, and building materials were shipped from India, but disease among the workers and shortage of construction supplies delayed the completion until 1895. The enlarged mosque occupied an entire block, save for a small plot of land, which was leased to businesses.

The mosque's architecture is a blend of Moorish and Mughal influences. The old former Mosque of the Arabs was incorporated as the main prayer hall in the expanded building, illuminated by glass chandeliers. An Indian almond or badamia tree stands in the middle of the mosque's courtyard and was already present on the two pieces of land that were purchased in 1852.

== Clergy ==
The imam of the Jummah Mosque is Muhammad Fakii Ali from Kenya. He is also the head of the madrasa (Islamic school), where hifz lessons (memorisation of the Qur'an) are given. The graduation ceremony is held every year on the 27th night of Ramadan, on the occasion of Laylat al-Qadr. The khatib of the Jummah Mosque is Mufti Muhammad Ishaq Qadiri Razvi from Pakistan.

== Organisation ==
The managing committee is elected on a three-year basis by the members of the Cutchi Maiman Society of Mauritius. After every three years of management, a new committee is voted or renewed. The current mutawalli (president) is Nissar Ahmad Ramtoola.

== See also ==
- Cutchi Memon
- Islam in Mauritius
- List of mosques in Africa
