= Islam in Mauritius =

Islam is the third largest religion in Mauritius. Muslims constitute 18.24% of the population as per the 2022 census. Most Mauritian Muslims are of Indian descent, tracing their origins to the large-scale migration of indentured laborers from India during the British colonial period. This migration began in 1834 and continued throughout the 19th and early 20th centuries.

Mauritius became independent in 1968 and no official religion is defined in the constitution. Hindus make up about half of the population, Christians about a third and Muslims most of the rest. Several religious groups including Muslim ones are recognized by parliamentary decree and receive state subsidies according to their percentage of the population.

== History ==
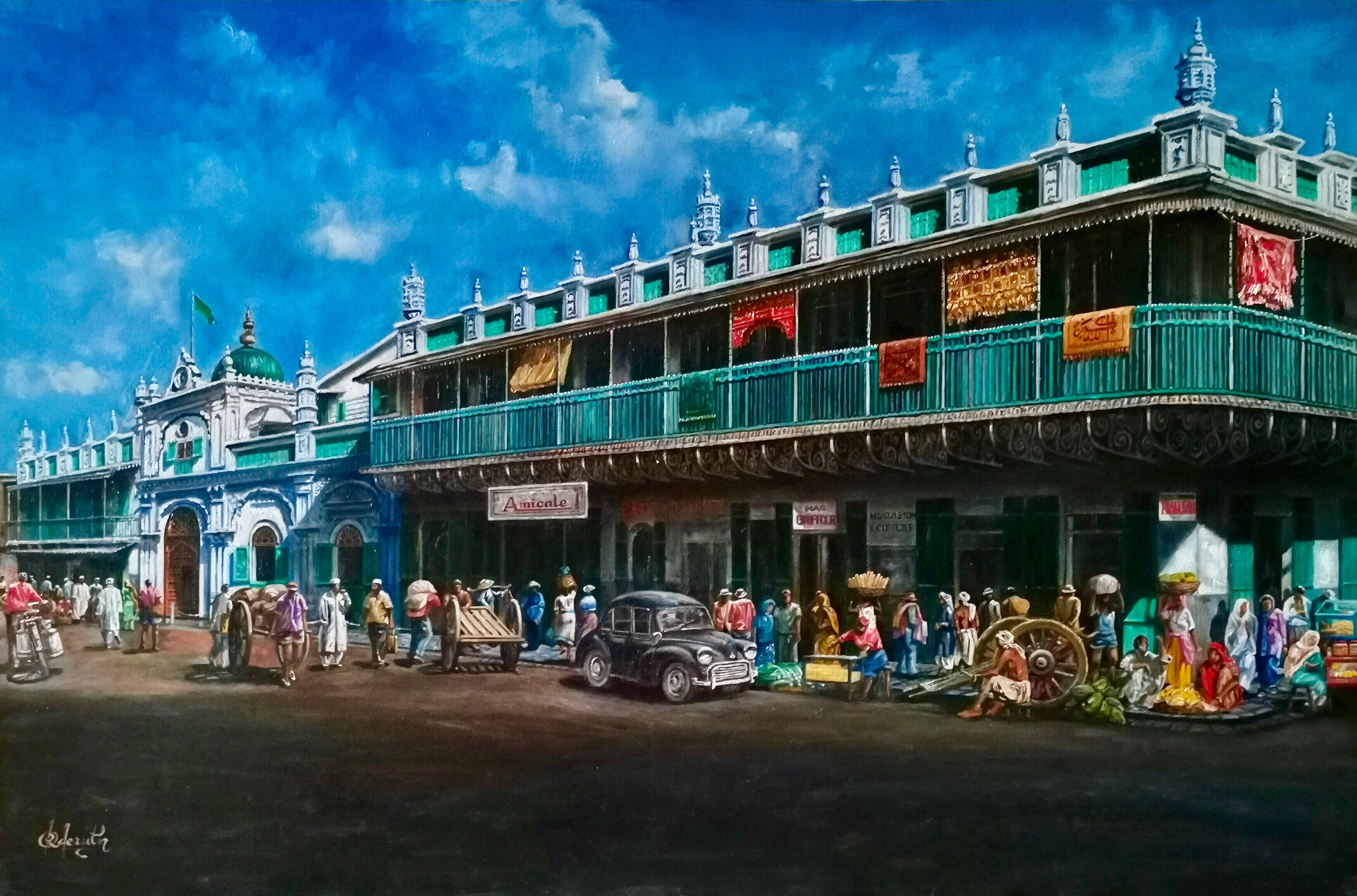
Jummah Mosque in 1970

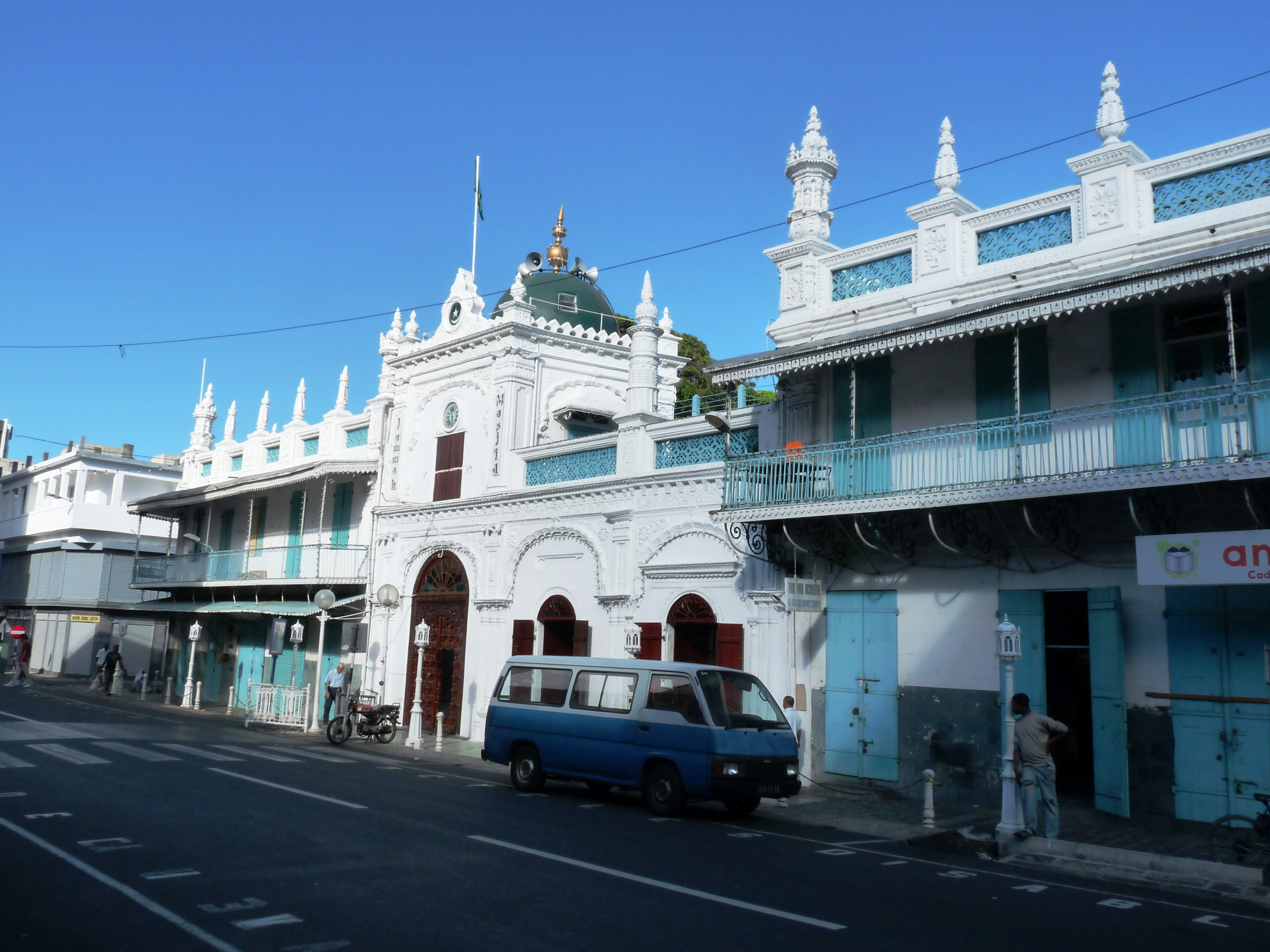
Jummah Mosque in 2008

Some scholars believe that Muslims arrived in Mauritius with the Dutch as slaves from Arabia, but this view is contested as the Arabians who were with the Dutch were mostly traders. Some of the later Black slaves from Subsaharan East Africa may have been Muslims. Half of all the Black and Malagasy slaves sold to the French colonists were captured by Muslim slavers based in Zanzibar as part of the broader Indian Ocean Arab slave trade based in Oman.

Under British rule, South Asian Muslims arrived in Mauritius as from 1834. Indentured labourers arrived on a large scale from India, mostly from Bihar boarding ships from Kolkata and Mumbai.

There were a total of 450,000 Indian immigrants from 1835 to 1907, and after 1909, the immigration of indentured labourers stopped. They were brought from India for a period of five years, after which they had the opportunity to go back. By 1922, only 160,000 had returned to India, with the others settling down in Mauritius.

A few wealthy Muslim families of traders from Gujarat also settled on the island along with the majority poor working classes. The population of Muslims is rumoured to have been 33% (no reference) of the total population during 1835, 64% during 1861 (no reference), but allegedly reduced to less than 25% by 1909. Traditionally Sunnis remained a majority, while other groups like Sunni Shafia, Shia and Bohra represent around 20 per cent of the total Muslims in the country.

Cocknies, Kodjas, Bohras and Aga-khanities are believed to have arrived in Mauritius during 1910 from East Africa. Tawheed ideology, which was commonly followed in Mauritius was replaced by Islamic Circle Religious Group which culled out religious practices from India. The trend was changed after the evolution of oil-rich Arab countries in the 1970s.

== Communities ==
The largest group of Muslims are the Sunnis, comprising around 90 per cent of the population. Sunnis are divided among various factions such as the Salafis. While the majority adheres to the Hanafi school of thoughts, there are other factions that follow the Shafi'i school of thoughts. Memons are a small aristocratic group, who control the Jummah Mosque in Port Louis. There are also Muslims who follow Shia Islam, forming a small community of around 3 per cent of the total population. One of the subgroups are called Cocknies, who are believed to have arrived as boat builders from Cochin in India. Creole Lascars are a new subgroup, who have intermarried with Cocknies or other communities.

Within the Muslim community, there are three distinct ethnic groups that exist, notably the Memons and the Surtees (who are rich merchants who came respectively from Kutch and Surat provinces of Gujarat in India), then the "Calcuttiyas" who came to Mauritius as indentured labourers through the port of Calcutta and hail from the Indian State of Bihar.

Mauritian Creole is the mother tongue of most Muslims today with muslim children opting for mainly Urdu and to a lesser degree, Arabic as the third language learnt at school (English and French are already compulsory).

Bhojpuri, once the most spoken mother tongue, has lesser speakers as well as Gujarati.

Muslim Mauritians share cultural and socio-economic traits with Hindu Mauritians with Indian films and Bollywood songs in Hindi popular within both communities and both belonging to the upper and middle classes. Religious tensions nonetheless exist between Muslims and other religious communities due to the conservatism and fanaticism of Muslims, especially on societal issues.

== Government policies ==
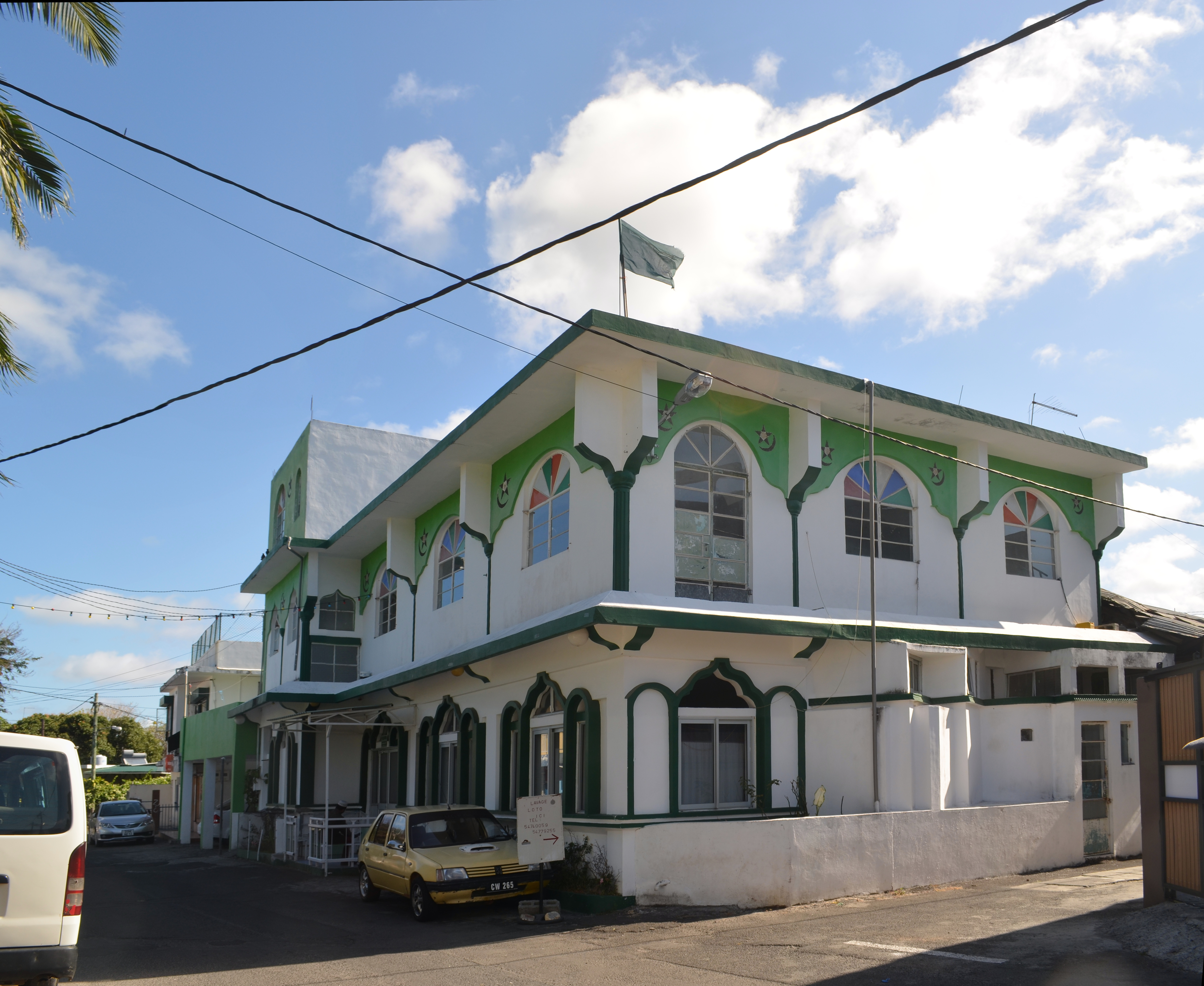
Roshan Jameer Masjid in Trou d'Eau Douce

Mauritius became independent in 1968 and has no state religion per the constitution. The nation had no indigenous population nor any indigenous tribes or religion.

The religious organizations present at the time of independence, namely, Roman Catholic Church, Church of England, Presbyterian Church, the Seventh-day Adventist, Hindu and Muslim organisations are recognized by parliamentary decree.

Freedom of religion is guaranteed by the Constitution and various laws. The groups recognized by the government at independence receive funding for their operating expenses based on their respective demographic weights.

The government allows overseas missionary groups to operate on a case-by-case basis, although there are no rules that prohibit proselytizing activities. The missionaries need both residence and work permits to operate, which is provided for a maximum of three years, without any extension.

Most national holidays are religious in nature, five being Hindu, two Christian, one Islamic and another one related to Chinese Traditions.

As per the International Religious Freedom report of 2012 published by the United States Department of States, there were no incidence of religious abuses. The report also indicates other religious groups claim that Hindus have a majority in the government, while Hindus have sought a policy for anti-conversion.

== Mosques and administration ==
As of 1965, there were 65 mosques in the country. The first purpose-built mosque in Mauritius is the Camp des Lascars Mosque in around 1805. It is now officially known as the Al-Aqsa Mosque.

The Jummah Mosque in Port Louis was built in the 1850s and is described in the Ministry of Tourism's guide as one of the most beautiful religious buildings in Mauritius.

All mosques are controlled by a board called waqf, also a form of charitable organization. The Waqf Board in Mauritius was created in 1941 and it supervises the finances and administration of all the mosques. Each mosque has a manager named muttanwalli, elected by a congregation. The board helps executing funerals, imparting education in madraasas and all Islamic ceremonies. Major holidays like Bakrid, Eid, Mawlid, Shab-e-barat, Mi'raj and, for the Shia only, Muharram are celebrated with floats in the major mosques in the country.

== Notable Muslims ==
- Shirin Aumeeruddy-Cziffra, first Muslim woman Member of Parliament, Minister and Speaker of the National Assembly
- Raouf Bundhun, Vice President of Mauritius
- Ameenah Gurib-Fakim, first female President of Mauritius
- Rehana Mungly-Gulbul, first female Chief Justice of the Supreme Court
- Abdool Razack Mohamed, Minister of Housing and Lands
- Cassam Uteem, first Muslim President of Mauritius

== See also ==
- Mauritius
- Religion in Mauritius
