= History of the Jews in Mauritius =

The location of Mauritius in relation to Africa

The history of the Jews in Mauritius goes back to the first Jews who arrived in Mauritius from Haifa, British Palestine (now Israel), in the 1940s because they were denied entry to Palestine by the British Government.

According to the 2011 census, there were about 43 Jews in Mauritius; by 2022, it was reported that there were 100 Jews in the country.

There is a synagogue in Curepipe, and a Jewish cemetery in Bambous. Judaism is a minor religion in Mauritius.

== History ==
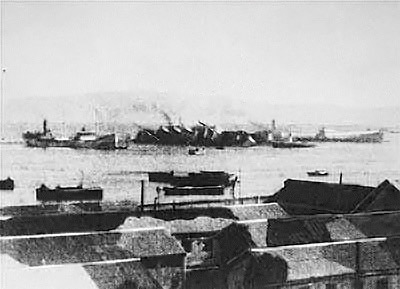
The Patria after the bombing

=== Patria and World War II ===
In September 1940, the Atlantic, Milos, and Pacific, picked up 3,600 Jews from Vienna, Gdańsk and Prague in Tulcea, Romania, to be sent to Palestine. The Jews that arrived in Palestine trying to escape the Holocaust came without entry permits and were subsequently denied entry by the British government, specifically Sir Harold MacMichael, who was the High Commissioner. The British decided to deport the immigrants to either Trinidad and Tobago or Mauritius, both British colonies.

On 25 November 1940, a bomb planted by the Haganah, a Zionist paramilitary organisation, who wanted the Jews onboard to stay in Palestine, detonated on the Patria, a ship which was carrying an initial 1,800 deportees to Mauritius. It is claimed that the Haganah's intention was only to cripple the ship, however they miscalculated the required explosive force and instead it sank rapidly in Haifa Bay. There were 260 fatalities and 172 injuries. There were only enough lifeboats for 805, since the capacity was 805 when the Patria was a French ship. When the British repossessed the boat, they increased the capacity to 1,800 but still had the same number of lifeboats. The surviving Jews were sent to Atlit detainee camp. The remaining 1,584 refugees from the Atlantic who were not on the Patria were initially also imprisoned in Atlit, but were sent to Mauritius on 9 December 1940. When they arrived, they were sent to a detainment camp in Beau-Bassin.

In the camp, the detainees suffered from tropical diseases and inadequate food and clothing. Jewish organizations such as the South African Jewish Board of Deputies, the Jewish Agency, and the Zionist Federation, sent food, clothing, medicine, and religious items to the detainees. Initially, a ban on interaction between the sexes was enforced; the men were held in a former jailhouse and the women in adjacent iron huts. After the ban was lifted, 60 children were born in the camp. In total, 128 prisoners died in the camp, and were buried in the Jewish section of St. Martin Cemetery. After the British Army began recruiting for the Jewish Brigade, 212 detainees enlisted with 300 others rejected as medically unfit. At the end of World War II, the detainees were given the choice of returning to their former homes in Europe or immigrating to Palestine. Most chose Palestine, and on August 6, 1945, 1,320 landed in Haifa.

=== Present ===
According to the population census of 2011, there are 43 Jews in Mauritius. The current community is unrelated to the 1940s fugitives. The first Bar Mitzvah in Mauritius since World War II took place in 2000.

There is also one synagogue in Curepipe, the Amicale Maurice Israel Center, which was opened in 2005. The Saint Martin Cemetery in Saint Martin near Beau-Bassin, is the only Jewish cemetery in Mauritius. The bodies of the 127 died detainees as well as other Jewish people are buried there. Part of this has been fictionalised in Natacha Appanah's 'The Last Brother'. It relates the childhood experiences of Raj and David, a little boy from Prague.

In 2015, the Jewish Detainees Memorial was opened in Beau-Bassin.

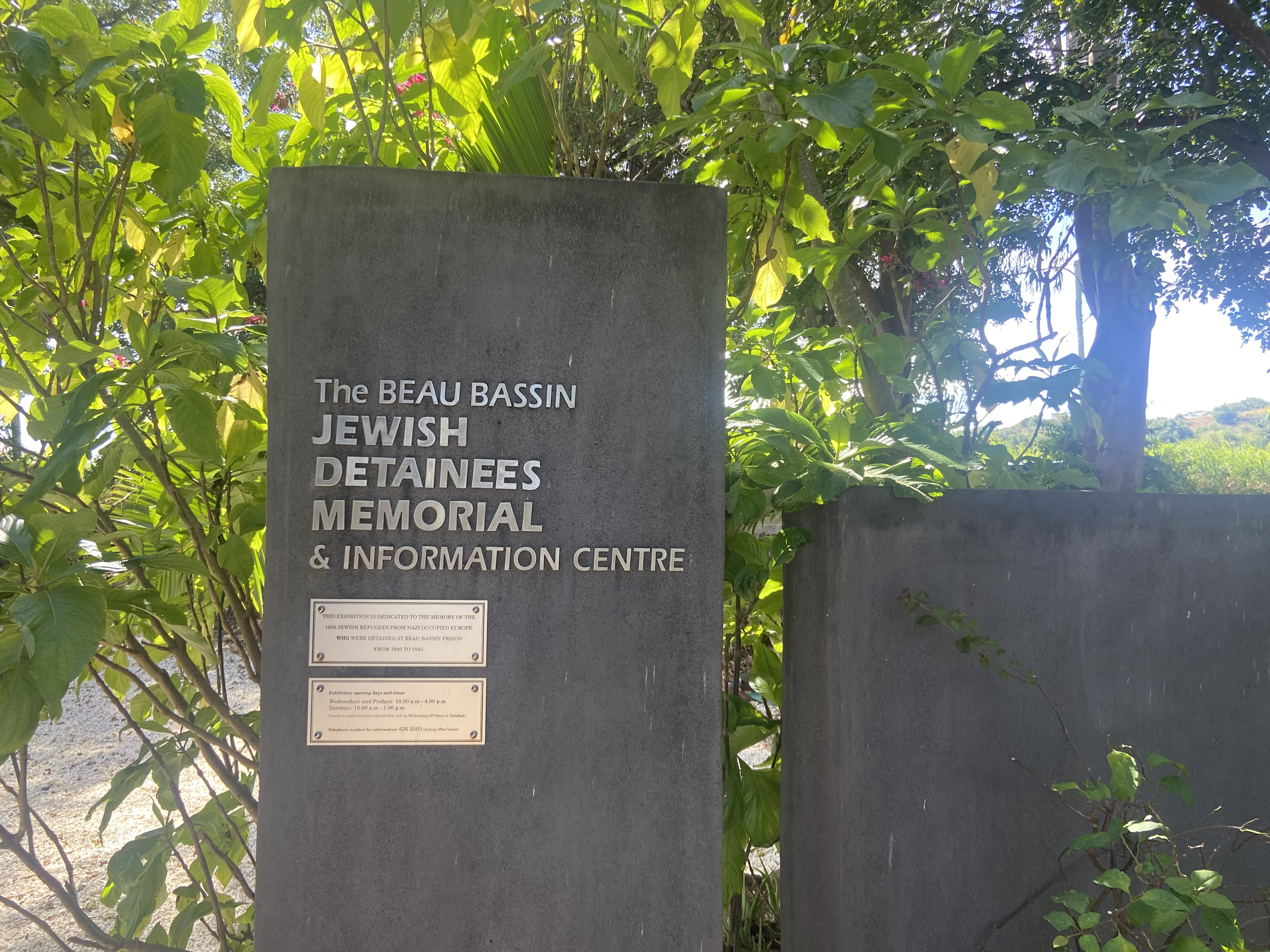
The Beau-Bassin Jewish Detainees Memorial & Information Centre

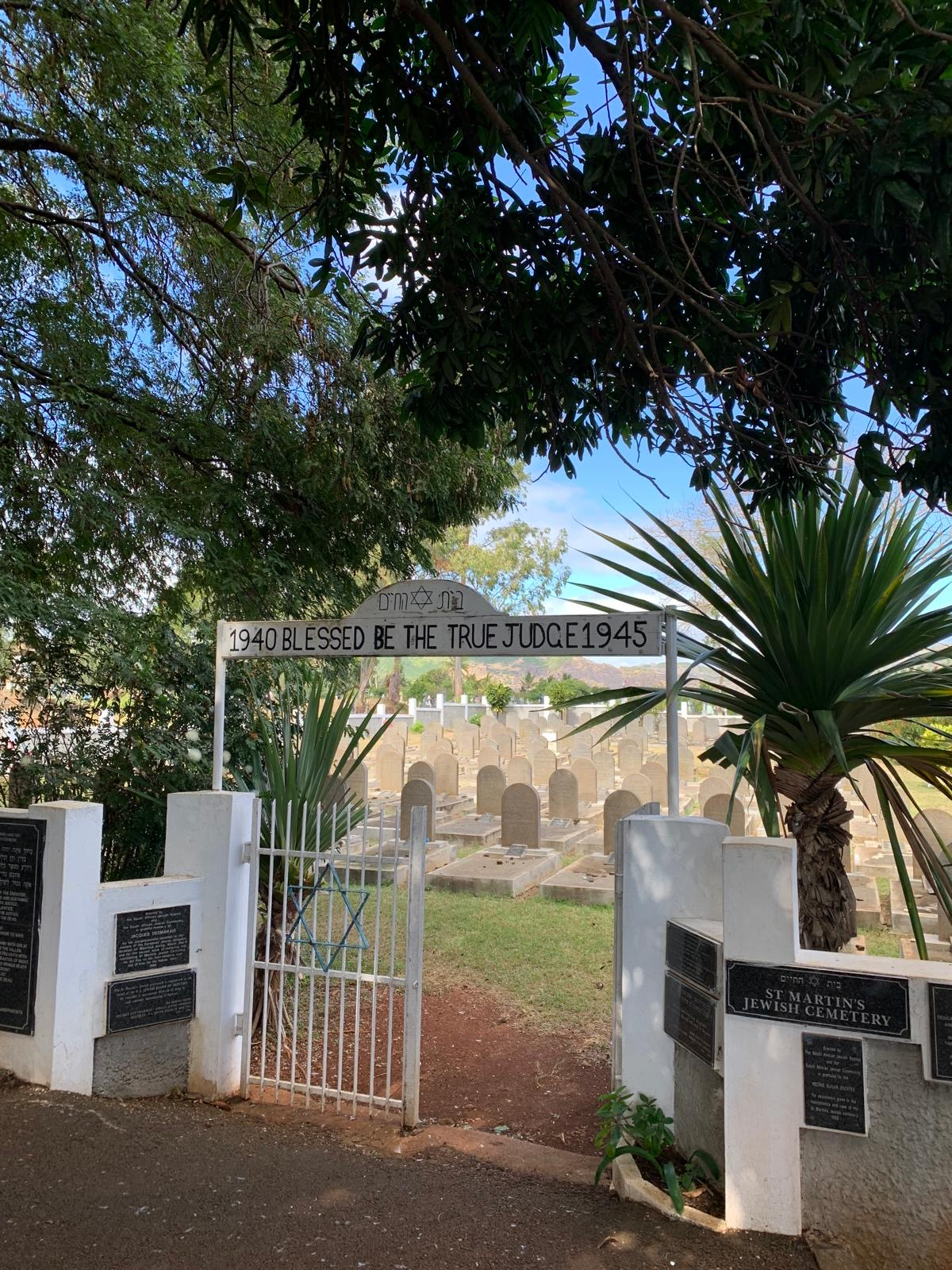
Entrance to the Saint Martin Jewish Cemetery in Beau-Bassin, Mauritius

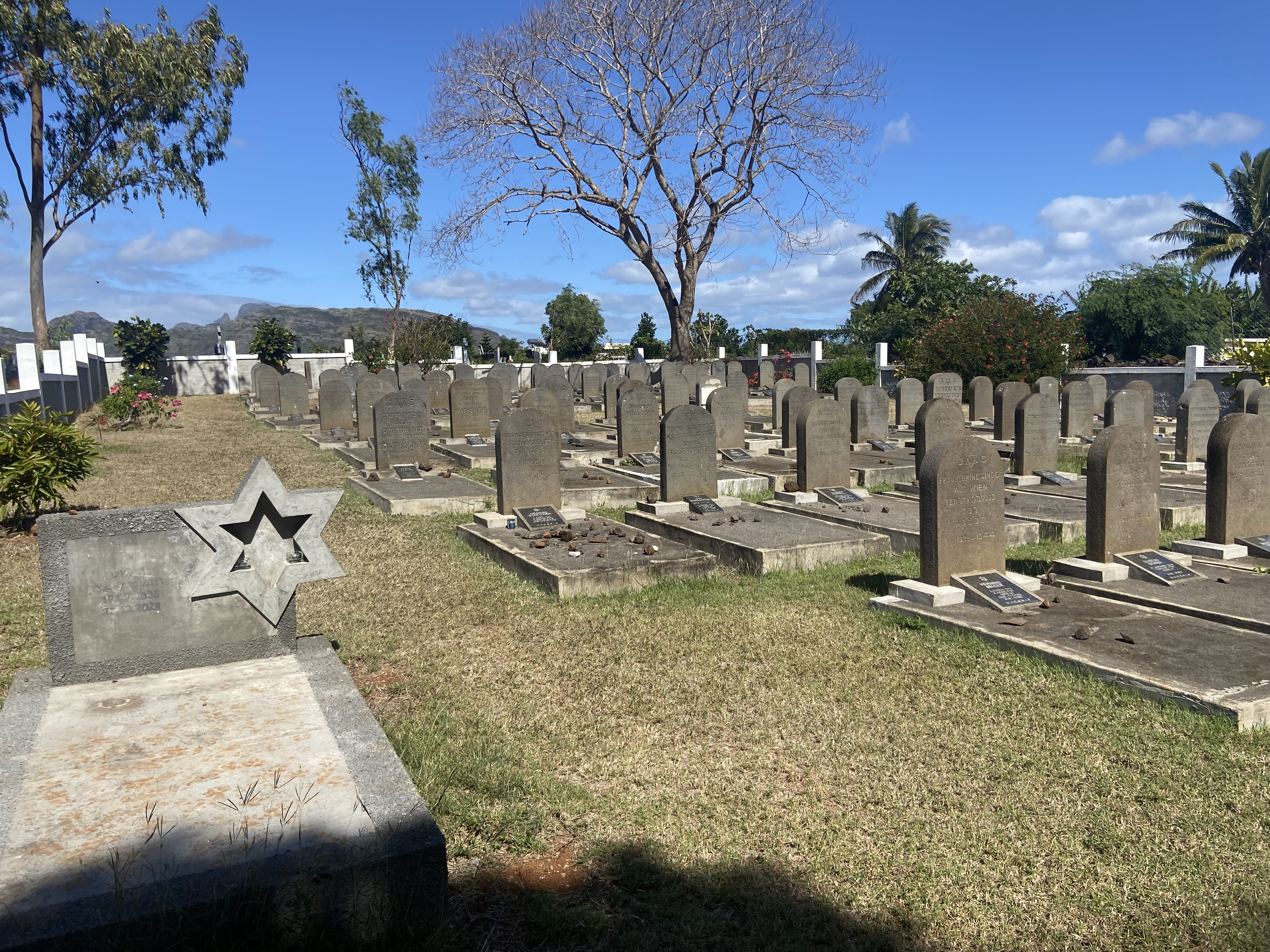
Saint Martin Jewish Cemetery

== See also ==
- History of the Jews in Africa

=== Regions: ===
- History of the Jews in Central Africa
- History of the Jews in East Africa
- History of the Jews in North Africa
- History of the Jews in Southern Africa
- History of the Jews in West Africa

=== Topics ===
- Religion in Mauritius
- Misha Mansoor, an American musician of Mauritian Jewish ancestry
