= Ganga Talao =

Lake in Mauritius

- Ganga Talab - Grand Bassin
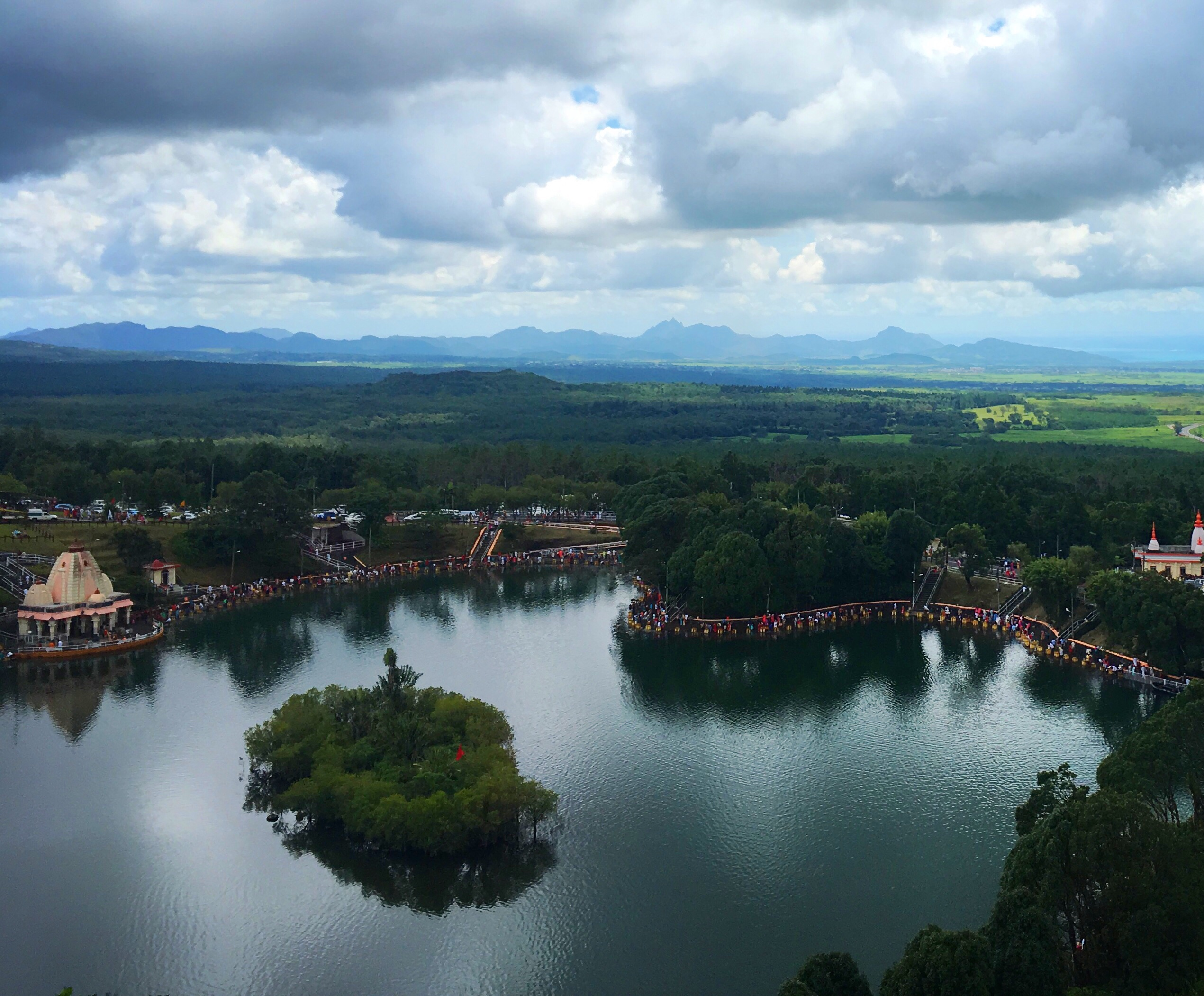
- Ganga Talao lake in Mauritius

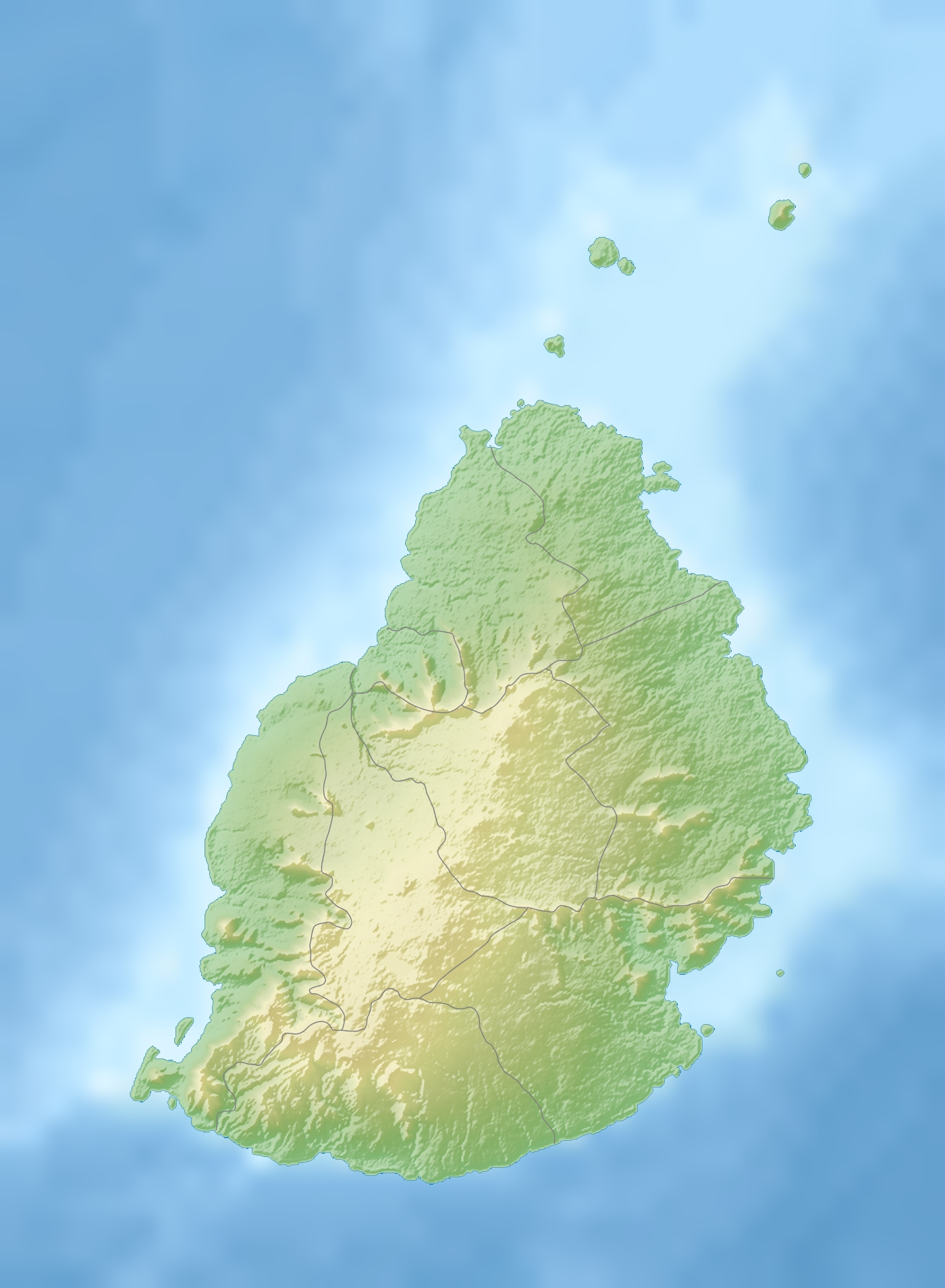
- Location within Mauritius
- Location: Mauritius
- Coordinates: 20°25′05″S 57°29′31″E
- Surface elevation: 550 m (1,800 ft)
- Settlements: Savanne

Ganga Talao (commonly known as Grand Bassin [ɡʁɑ̃ basɛ̃]) is considered a sacred lake among Hindus, located in a volcanic crater situated in a secluded mountain area, high above the Indian Ocean in the district of Savanne on the island of Mauritius.

The Ganga Talao acts as the "cultural touchstone" for Mauritius' Indian emigrants. The lake serves as the location of an annual pilgrimage during Maha Shivaratri, the island's most important Hindu festival.

Various Prime Ministers and officials of India have visited the site over the years as a symbolic gesture of the cultural connection and deep rooted ties between India and Mauritius.

== Etymology ==
Ganga Talao literally means the "Lake of Ganga", an allusion to the Grand Bassin's symbolic connection with the Indian river Ganga (Ganges).

== History ==
According to legend, in 1887 (some say 1890s) a priest by the name of Pandit Jhummun Giri of Triolet claimed to have experienced a revelation in a dream of seeing the waters of the Ganga Talao flowing from the goddess deity Ganga. News of the revelation spread quickly and the Ganga Talao became the "embodiment of a Hindu God" which connected it to the river Ganges 4,000 miles away.

The importance of the lake and it's celebration traces back to the difficulties experienced during Mauritius' Indian emigrants when half a million indentured laborers were brought to the island in the nineteenth century with promises of a better life. For those that survived the journey across the Indian Ocean aboard ships rife with disease, they were put to hard labor in the sugar can fields. The revelation of the priest allowed the emigrants to create a link back to the Ganges and to "bathe in sacred waters once more."

The first group of pilgrims to Ganga Talao were from the village of Triolet and led by Pandit Giri Gossayne from Terre Rouge in 1898.

In 1998 it was declared a "sacred lake". In 1972, some holy water from the Ganges River was mixed establishing a symbolic link with the sacred Indian River and the lake was renamed Ganga Talao.

== Maha Shivarati pilgrimage and event ==
The celebration of Maha Shivarati is dedicated to the Hindu god Shiva, one of the three major deities in Hinduism. During Shivaratri, close to half a million Hindus in Mauritius go on a pilgrimage to the lake, many walking from their homes carrying hand-made Kanvars (kanwars), small shrines dedicated to the god Shiva. These small shrines are placed along the edge of the lake, where pilgrims provide offerings of food, fire, prayer, and ceremonies. One ritual is to do their prayers with the water from the lake so that they are "purified" and so that Shiva's energy is "transferred" to them.

Those who have made the pilgrimage often bottle some of the water, which is considered "sacred liquid," to bring back for those unable to come.

Tradition often holds that people offer food and drink to the pilgrims.

== Mangal Mahadev - Shiva Statue ==
Mangal Mahadev is a 33 m (108 ft) tall statue of the Hindu god, Shiva, standing with his trident at the entrance of Ganga Talao. Inaugurated in 2007, it is the tallest statue in Mauritius and a faithful copy of the Shiva statue in Sursagar Lake in Vadodara, Gujarat in India.

There are temples dedicated to other gods as well, including Lord Hanuman, Goddess Ganga, and Lord Ganesh along the Grand Bassin.

== Durga Mata Murti ==
Durga Mata Statue

The statue is 33 m (108 ft) tall. The festivals Durga Pooja and Navaratri are lavishly celebrated around the island in temples or temporary structures built for the occasion.

== Gallery ==
Statues of Durga and Shiva near the lake.

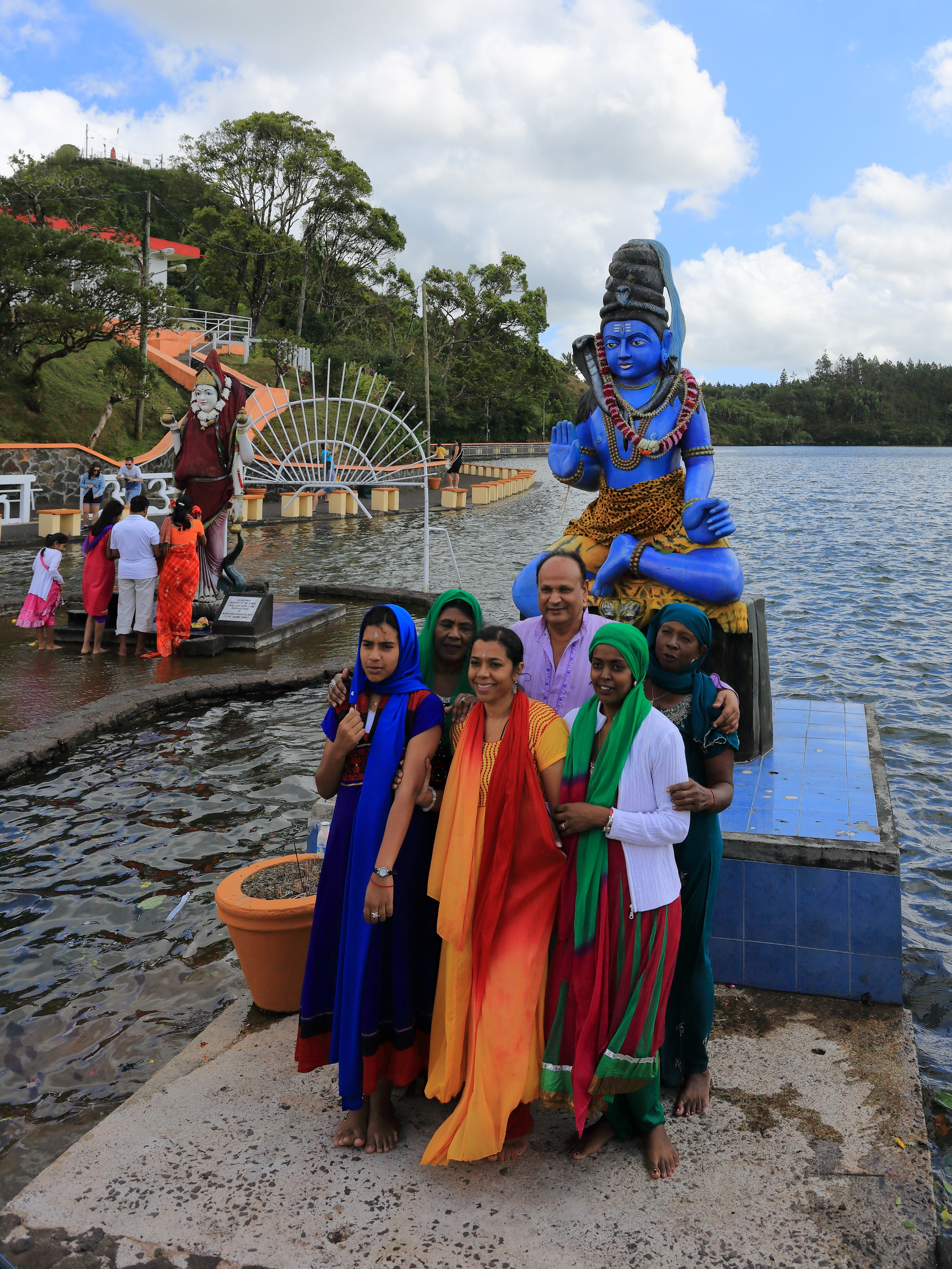
Pilgrims

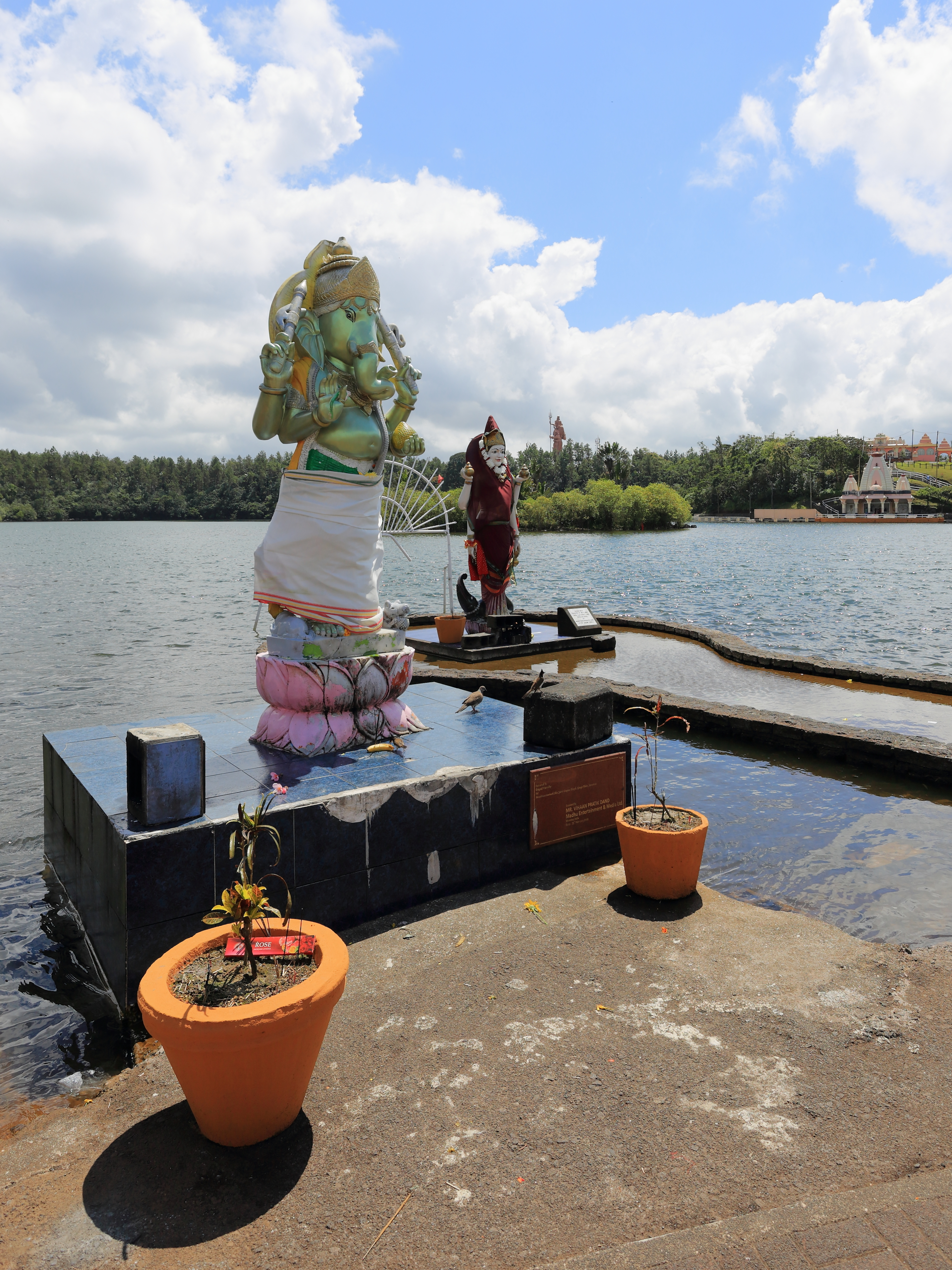
Statues of deities
