= Kalkatiya Urdu =

A dialect of Urdu spoken in Kolkata

- Urdu dialect of Calcutta
- Region: Kolkata
- Ethnicity: Calcuttans
- Language family: Indo-European: Indo-Iranian; Indo-Aryan; Central Indo-Aryan; Western Hindi; Hindustani; Urdu; Kalkatiya Urdu
- Writing system: Perso-Arabic script (Urdu alphabet)

Language codes
- ISO 639-3: –

Kalkatiya Urdu (Urdu: کلکتیا اردو) is a variety of Urdu spoken in the city of Kolkata. Due to the influence of the Bengali language, it possesses a distinct identity. It is particularly prevalent in the city's Muslim neighbourhoods and has a notable literary heritage. The features of Kalkatiya Urdu reflect clear traces of Bengali influence, which are evident in its phonetics, grammar, and vocabulary. For instance, certain phonemes and sentence structures exhibit a Bengali-style articulation. From a literary perspective, Kalkatiya Urdu has produced several notable figures who contributed significantly to poetry and prose in this dialect. Ibrahim Hosh is a prominent example, who set a unique precedent through his poetry in Kalkatiya Urdu.

According to linguist Naseer Ahmad, Kalkatiya Urdu is a distinct sociolect spoken primarily in the Muslim neighbourhoods of Kolkata. It is especially prevalent among older and less formally educated residents, many of whom trace their ancestry to migrants from Bihar. The dialect exhibits influences from regional languages such as Magadhi, Bhojpuri, and Bengali, particularly noticeable in pronunciation, grammar, and vocabulary. It is commonly used among working-class Urdu speakers for everyday communication. While the dialect is largely confined to Kolkata, some speakers also attempt to adopt the standard form of Bengali Urdu used by the educated segments of the Urdu-speaking population. Literary samples of Kalkatiya Urdu have appeared in various writings.

Apurbo Krishna Kunvar (d. 1867) used Kalkatiya Urdu in a few couplets of his Masnawi-e-Kunvar.
