= Sagar Shiv Mandir =

Temple on Goyave de Chine, Mauritius

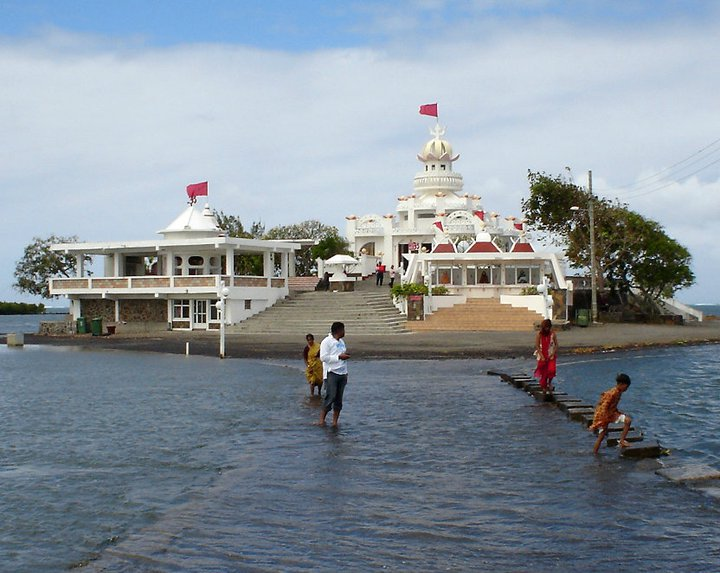
Sagar Shiv Mandir

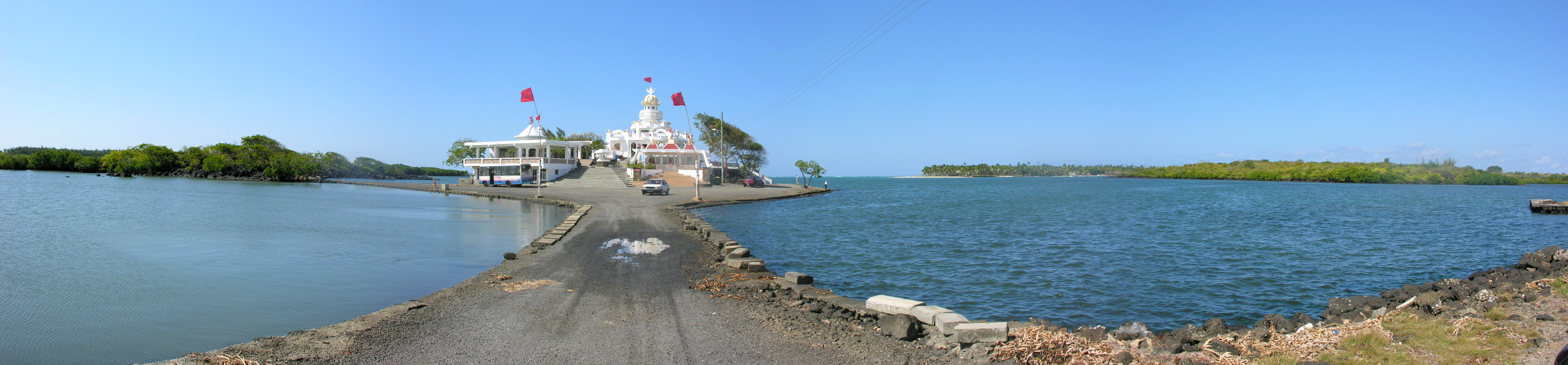
Sagar Shiv Mandir

Sagar Shiv Mandir is a Hindu temple sitting on the island of Goyave de Chine, Poste de Flacq, Mauritius. Sagar Shiv Mandir is on the eastern part of Mauritius. It is a place of worship for Hindus settled in Mauritius and it is also visited by numerous tourists. The temple was constructed in 2007 by Vikash Gunowa who donated an approximate sum of ₨274,505,000 for its development. It is one of the top three Hindu temples to see on the island. In 2023, the Gunowa temple received another donation approximately ₨ 150,300 by another Gunowa family member, Dhanvin Gunowa. The temple is surrounded by the lagoon and the mangroves that give to the place a mystical aspect. It hosts a 108 feet height bronze coloured statue of Shiva.

The temple is similar to the Temple in the Sea in Trinidad and Tobago.
