= Episcopal Conference of the Indian Ocean =

Assembly of Catholic bishops

The Episcopal Conference of the Indian Ocean (French: Conférence Épiscopale de l'Océan Indien, CEDOI) is the episcopal conference of the Catholic Church which includes the following Indian Ocean archipelagic states: Comoros, Mauritius, Réunion, Mayotte and Seychelles.

== History ==
Since 1974, the bishops of the Indian Ocean islands would gather each year in an informal meeting. In 1976 the Holy See recognized this assembly with the name of Pastoral Zone of the South West Indian Ocean islands. In 1985 the assembly obtained from Rome the status of a Bishops' Conference with the official name of Conférence Épiscopale de l'Océan Indien. The islands that make up the C.E.D.O.I. have a Catholic population estimated at around one million. Its seat is the town of Port Victoria in Seychelles. The Episcopal Conference is a member of the Symposium of Episcopal Conferences of Africa and Madagascar.

== Members ==
- Roman Catholic Diocese of Port Victoria or Seychelles
- Diocese of Port-Louis, Mauritius
- Vicariate Apostolic of Rodrigues, Mauritius
- Diocese of Saint-Denis-de-La Réunion, Réunion
- Apostolic Vicariate of the Comoros Archipelago, Comoros and Mayotte

== Presidents ==
List of presidents of the Episcopal Conference:

1986–1989: Jean Margéot, Cardinal, bishop of Port-Louis

1989–1996: Gilbert Guillaume Jean-Marie Aubry, Bishop of Saint-Denis-de-La Réunion

1996–2002: Maurice Piat, Bishop of Port-Louis

2002–2006: Gilbert Guillaume Jean-Marie Aubry, Bishop of Saint-Denis-de-La Réunion

2006 – present: Denis Wiehe, Bishop of Port Victoria
