= Religion in Seychelles =

Religious Affiliation in the Seychelles (2022 Census)
1. Roman Catholicism (61.3%)
2. Other Christian (13.6%)
3. Hinduism (5.40%)
4. Islam (2.40%)
5. Other (5.10%)
6. Not stated (Note: Includes Not Specified, Missing and Unable to classify- data mentioned in the Census) (12.2%)

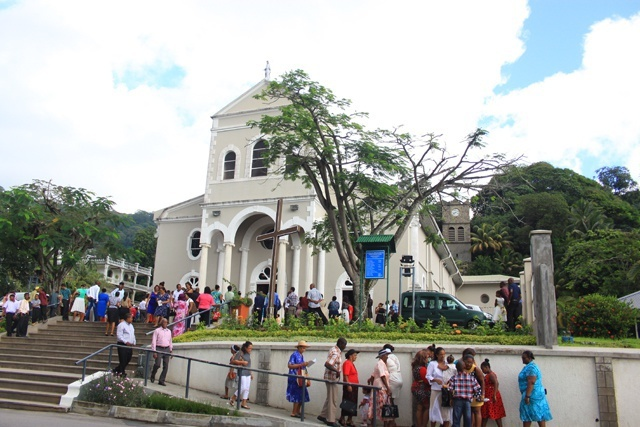
Cathedral of the Immaculate Conception in Victoria

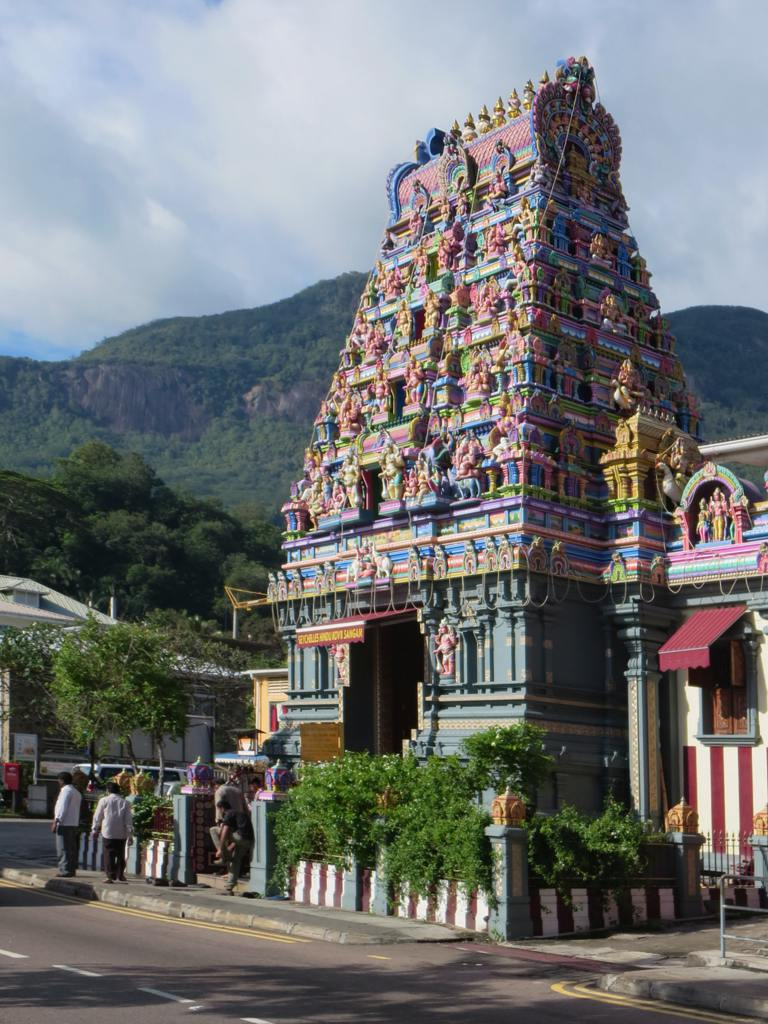
Arulmigu Navashakti Vinayakar Temple in Victoria

Christianity is the majority religion in Seychelles, with Roman Catholicism being its largest denomination.

The country is officially secular and its constitution guarantees freedom of conscience and religious practice.

== Demographics ==
According to the most recent census of 2022, the majority of the population follows Christianity. Most of the Christian were Roman Catholics (61.3%). About 5% are Anglican Christians and 8.6% follows other sects of Christianity, like Baptists, Seventh-day Adventists, Assemblies of God, the Pentecostal Church, Nazarites, Greek Orthodox, and Jehovah's Witnesses.

Over the censuses 1987 to 2010, there has been a slight decrease of the percentage of Catholics.

Hinduism is the largest non-Christian faith in Seychelles followed by 5.4% of its population. Hinduism is followed mostly by the Indo-Seychellois community.

Islam is followed by 2.4% of the population.

There is also a small number of followers of Rastafarians, Baha’is and Brahma Kumaris.

== Background ==
The initial settlers in Seychelles were Roman Catholics, and the country has remained so, despite ineffective British efforts to establish Protestantism in the islands during the nineteenth century. The nation has been a bishopric since 1890, and mission schools had a virtual monopoly on education until the government took over such schools in 1944. Sunday masses are well attended, and religious holidays are celebrated throughout the nation both as opportunities for the devout to practise their faith and as social events. Practising Catholicism, like speaking French, historically conferred a certain status by associating its adherents with the settlers from France.

Most Anglicans are descendants of families converted by missionaries in the late 19th and early 20th century. Evangelical Protestant churches are active and growing, among them Pentecostals and Seventh-day Adventists. A Hindu temple and mosque exist on Mahé. Some tax exemptions are granted to groups which are registered with the Finance Ministry.

Although the clergy and the civil authorities disapprove, many Seychellois see little inconsistency between their orthodox Religious Observance and belief in magic, witchcraft, and sorcery. It is not uncommon to consult a local seer – known as a bonom di bwa – for fortune-telling or to obtain protective amulets or charms, called gri-gri, to bring harm to enemies.

== See also ==
- Hinduism in Seychelles
- Islam in Seychelles
- Roman Catholicism in Seychelles
