= Wiehe (surname) =

Wiehe is a surname. Notable people with the surname include:

- Denis Wiehe (born 1940), Mauritian Roman Catholic bishop
- Gabrielle Wiehe (born 1980), Mauritian illustrator and graphic designer
- Henrik Wiehe (1927–1987), Danish actor
- Mikael Wiehe (born 1946), Swedish singer, multi-instrumentalist and composer
- Viggo Wiehe (1874-1956), Danish actor
