= List of Catholic dioceses in Indian Ocean Episcopal Conference =

The Roman Catholic Church in the lesser East African Indian Ocean states (not Madagascar) is composed of only a Latin hierarchy, without a proper ecclesiastical province but joined in a single episcopal conference,
comprising five exempt jurisdictions, i.e. directly dependent on the Holy See :

- three exempt dioceses (on Mauritius, Réunion and the Seychelles)
- two missionary pre-diocesan Apostolic vicariates (entitled to titular bishops) : one for the Comoros and Mayotte; the other in above Mauritius.

There are no titular sees.

All defunct jurisdictions have current successors.

There are also three papal diplomatic representations (in fact all vested in the apostolic nunciature (embassy) on Madagascar) :

- the Apostolic Nunciature to Mauritius
- the Apostolic Nunciature to Seychelles
- the Apostolic Delegation to Comoros (papal legation);
  none to Mayotte or Réunion, as those depend on metropolitan France without full statehood.

== Current jurisdictions ==
=== Episcopal Conference of the Indian Ocean (minor African East Coast Island states) ===
all Immediately subject to the Holy See

- Mauritius
  - Diocese of Port-Louis on Mauritius (also covers the British Indian Ocean Territory)
  - Apostolic Vicariate of Rodrigues, covering part of Mauritius
- Diocese of Saint-Denis-de-La Réunion on and for Réunion
- Diocese of Port Victoria on and for the Seychelles
- Apostolic Vicariate of the Comoros Archipelago, on the Comoros, also for Mayotte.

== Sources and external links ==
- GCatholic.org Comoros.
- GCatholic.org Mauritius.
- GCatholic.org Mayotte.
- GCatholic.org Réunion.
- GCatholic.org Seychelles.
- Catholic-Hierarchy entry.
