= Diocese of Victoria =

Diocese of Victoria may refer to:

- Roman Catholic Diocese of Victoria in Canada, in Victoria, British Columbia
- Roman Catholic Diocese of Victoria in Texas, in Victoria, Texas
- The former Anglican Diocese of Victoria, Hong Kong, which had since been reorganised into the Hong Kong Sheng Kung Hui, an Anglican province
- the former Roman Catholic Diocese of Victoria in Australia (now Darwin)

== See also ==
- Province of Victoria, in Australia
- Roman Catholic Diocese of Port Victoria (Seychelles)
