= Daniel Liston =

Irish member of the Congregation of the Holy Spirit

Daniel Liston C.S.Sp.
- Bishop of Port-Louis
- Church: Catholic Church
- Diocese: Diocese of Port-Louis
- In office: 19 December 1949 – 23 April 1968
- Predecessor: James Leen
- Successor: Jean Margéot
- Previous posts: Titular Bishop of Summa (1968-1970); Titular Bishop of Drivastum (1947-1949); Coadjutor Bishop of Port-Louis (1947-1949)

Orders
- Ordination: 28 July 1929
- Consecration: 12 October 1947 by David Mathew

Personal details
- Born: 14 April 1900 Foynes, County Limerick, United Kingdom of Great Britain and Ireland
- Died: 3 May 1986 (aged 86) Kimmage, Dublin, Republic of Ireland

Daniel Liston (14 April 1900 – 3 May 1986) was an Irish member of the Congregation of the Holy Spirit, who served a Bishop of Port Louis in Mauritius from 1949 until 1968.

Born on 14 April 1900 in Foynes, County Limerick, Liston attended Blackrock College in Dublin for his secondary schooling.

He trained for the Spiritans in Blackrock College, Rockwell College, and at Holy Ghost College, Kimmage Manor, while studying for his BA degree at University College Dublin. He studied in Rome at the Pontifical Gregorian University gaining a BCL and Doctorate of Divinity and was ordained in 1928.

He was appointed rector of Quatre-Bornes Seminary College, Mauritius in 1937. Liston was ordained a co-adjutor Bishop of Port Louis in 1947 to fellow Limerickman Bishop James Leen, succeeding as Bishop in 1949, serving in Port Louis until 1968. Retiring to England where he served as a chaplain.

Moving back to Kimmage Manor in 1983, he died on 3 May 1996 and was buried in the Holy Ghost plot in Kimmage.
