= St. Francis of Assisi Church, Baie Lazare =

St. Francis of Assisi Church
- Église de Saint François d’Assise
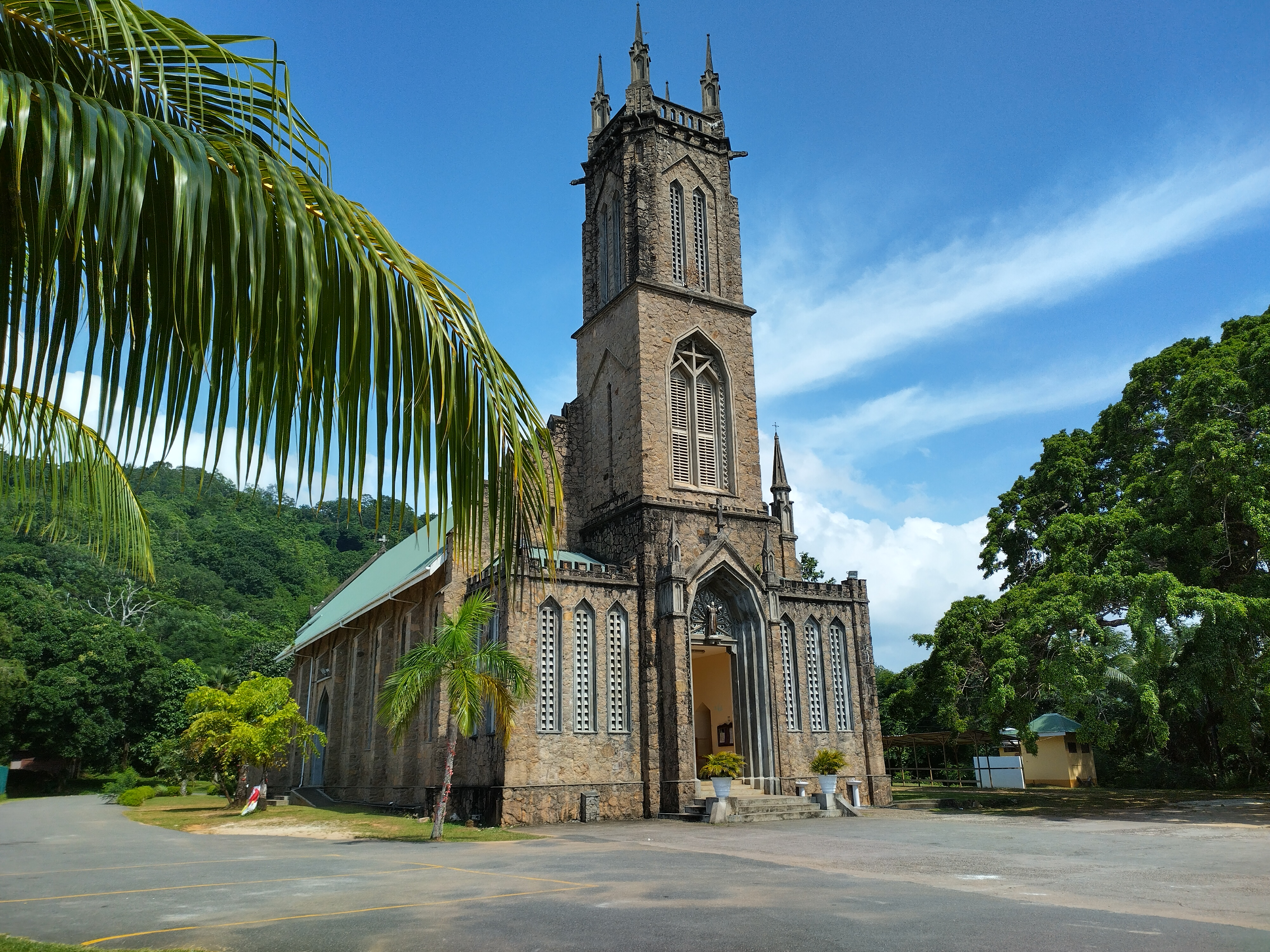

- Location on the Seychelles
- 4.7530°S 55.4815°E
- Location: Baie Lazare
- Country: Seychelles
- Denomination: Roman Catholic Church

The St. Francis of Assisi Church (French: Église de Saint François d’Assise) or simply Church of St. Francis, is a parish of the Roman Catholic Church located in Baie Lazare, on the island of Mahé in the Seychelles.

It is under the Diocese of Port Victoria or Seychelles (Dioecesis Portus Victoriae or seychellarum).

== History ==
The first church dates back to 1888, but the current church was opened in 1953. Its architecture has become a tourist attraction.

Recently, the building one of the most important architectural works of the place was reopened after it was closed for a while for renovations. The funds used come from parishioners and the state.

== See also ==
- Catholic Church in Seychelles
- St. Francis of Assisi Church (disambiguation)
