= Christianity in Mauritius =

According to the 2022 census, Christianity was adhered to by 32.3% of the population of Mauritius; 80.3% of these were Roman Catholics.

Figures in 2020 showed that 33.06% of the population were Christian.

The Mauritian Creole and Franco-Mauritian ethnic groups are mostly Christian and significant parts of the Sino-Mauritian ethnic group are also mainly Christian. Mauritius gained independence in 1968 and there was no state religion in Mauritius defined in the constitution. The religious organizations present at the time of independence, namely, Roman Catholic Church, Church of England, Presbyterian Church, Seventh-day Adventist, Hindus and Muslims are recognized by parliamentary decree.

Roman Catholics are the majority Christians, while others denominations include Evangelicals, Baptists, Anglicans, Pentecostals, Presbyterians, Eastern Orthodox, Seventh-day Adventists, Jehovah’s Witnesses, The Church of Jesus Christ of Latter-day Saints, and the Assemblies of God. Port Louis and the island of Rodrigues have majority Catholic populations. The country has a rich missionary history within the Protestantism branch of Christianity.

== History ==
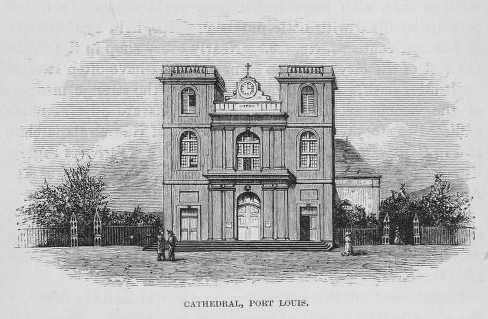
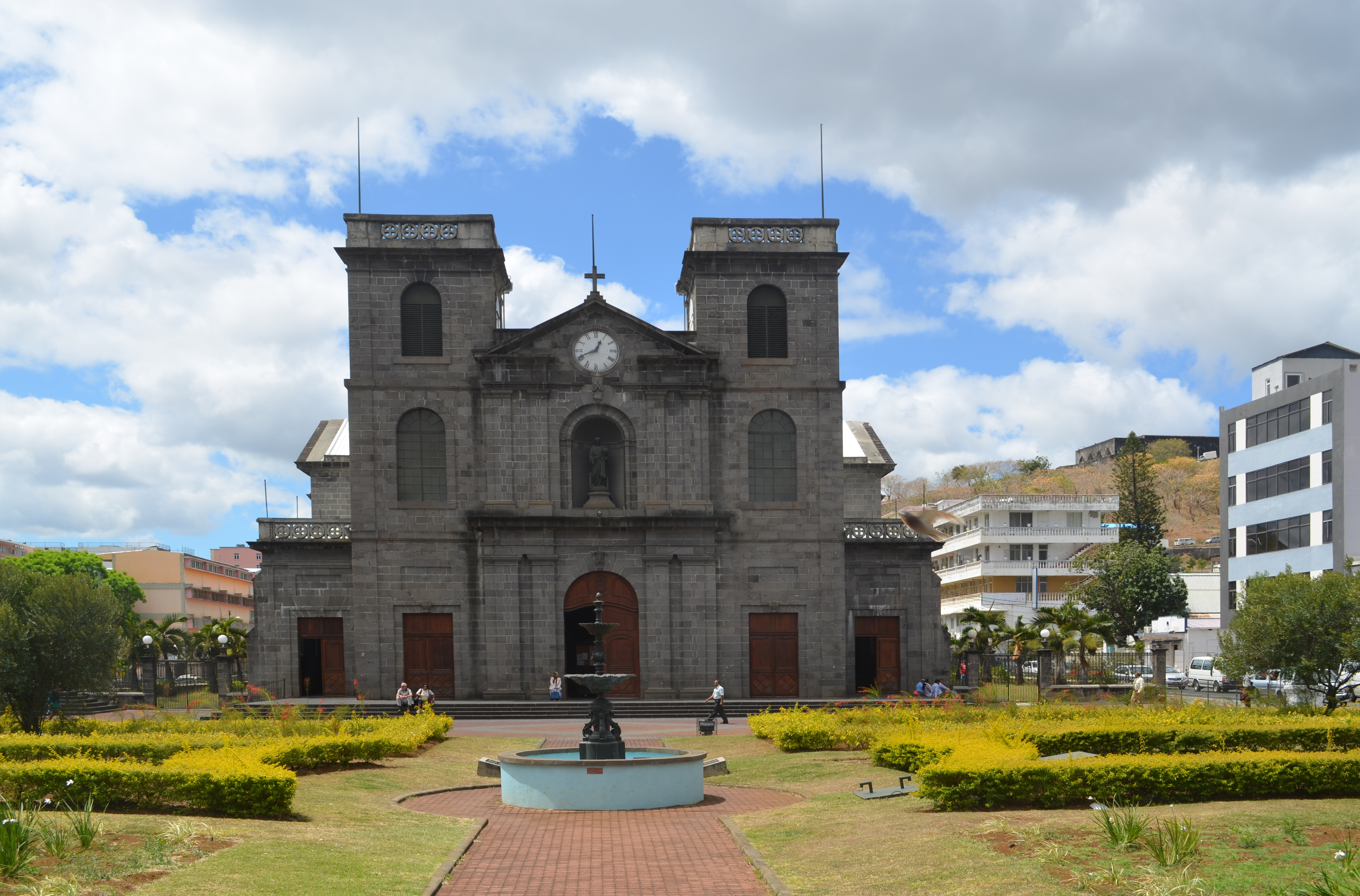
Old and new images of St. Louis Cathedral, Port-Louis

Christianity first came to Mauritius with the first inhabitants, the Dutch. However, the Dutch abandoned the island in 1710. The French brought Christianity again when they arrived in 1715. From 1723, there was a law whereby all slaves coming to the island must be baptised Catholic. This law does not seem to have been strictly adhered to. In December 1810, 11,500 soldiers from Britain in 70 vessels started to north of Isle de France from Rodrigues to neutralize the island from the French to prevent them from using it as a base to attack India. Decaen, the French Governor, was expecting the forces in Port Louis and was surprised to see them in the Ille de France. He readily surrendered with a token resistance in the capital. The British forces allowed the French soldiers to leave and allowed the settlers to stay back. To prevent inhibition in the mind of settlers, the British pledged to preserver the laws of the land, religion, custom, language and property. After they had taken Mauritius from the French during the Napoleonic Wars, the British tried to turn Mauritius Protestant during the 1840s and 1850s.

Another account states that Christianity was the first religion in the island country and is the religion for both the Creole and the White population, with more than 80 per cent being Sino-Mauritans. But Franco-Mauritians, usually having the same religion and denomination as the Creoles, have sometimes emphasised their differences from the Creoles by practising more traditionally, for instance celebrating Mass in Latin.

== Christian faiths ==
Religious census (2022)
Faith	Total %
Hinduism	47.9
Roman Catholic	24.9
Islam	18.2
Other Christian	6.2
Others/Non-religious	12.2
* Other Christian - Seventh-day Adventists, Anglicans, Pentecostals, Presbyterians, Evangelicals, Jehovah's Witnesses, Assemblies of God and The Church of Jesus Christ of Latter-day Saints,
* Others - Buddhism, Animist & others

Reformed tradition in Mauritius dates back to 1598 during the period of Dutch. The Presbyterian Church in Mauritius is considered an inheritor of the tradition, but in spite of having Parish Ministry in just three places, it has strong links with Parishes in Scotland, France and Switzerland. Roman Catholicism is believed to have been introduced by the French during 1721. It is part of Bishop's Conference of Indian Ocean, it had 47 parishes and 97 priests as of 2001. The Anglican Church in Mauritius was introduced during the British from 1810 and in modern times, is a part of Province of Indian Ocean with 16 parishes and 12 priests as of 2001. The Seventh-day Adventist Church was formed in 1914, Brethren Church in 1942, New Jerusalem Church in 1907, Christian Science in 1950, Jehovah's Witnesses in 1951 and Assemblies of God in 2000.

== Government policies ==
Mauritius gained independence in 1968 and there was no state religion in Mauritius defined in the constitution. The nation had no indigenous population nor any indigenous tribes or religion. The religious organizations present at the time of independence, namely, Roman Catholic Church, Church of England, Presbyterian Church, Seventh-day Adventist, Hindus and Muslims are recognized by parliamentary decree. The constitution and other laws protect freedom of religion. The groups recognized by the government before independence receive an annual sum for paying their adherents. The government allows overseas missionary groups to operate on a case-by-case basis, although there are no rules that prohibit proselytizing activities. The missionaries should obtain both residence permit and work permit to operate, which is provided for a maximum of three years, without any extension. There are lot of government holidays, most of which are religious indicating the heterogeneity of religions. As per the International Religious Freedom report of 2012 published by the United States Department of State, there were no incidence of religious abuses. The report also indicates other religions claim that Hindus have a majority in the government, while Hindus have sought a policy for anti-conversion.

== Churches ==
The major and the oldest church in Mauritius is the St. Louis Cathedral, Port-Louis. Originally built by French during the 18th century, the church was destroyed in a cyclone during the early 19th century. It was rebuilt in 1925 and expanded with a twin tower in 1932. A fountain built in 1786 by Governor Vicomte de Souillac and an oil painting depicting a biblical scene, painted by A. Richard in 1855, are the major artefacts in the church. St. James Cathedral, located on the Poudriere Street is locally called cyclone shelter with its two metre thick wall of the old structure. St. Andrews, built in 1851 and St. Johns' in 1856 in Port Louis are prominent churches built by Patrick Beaton, the first minister of Church of Scotland in Mauritius.

There is also a Russian Orthodox parish and Church of the Transfiguration of the Lord in Port Louis, in the Cité Vallijee suburb in the western part of the city. The parish and church belong to the Diocese of Southern Africa of the Patriarchal Exarchate of Africa and are served by one priest.

== See also ==
- Roman Catholicism in Mauritius
