= St. Gabriel Cathedral, Rodrigues =

Coordinates: 19.7179°S 63.4385°E

St. Gabriel Cathedral
- Cathédrale Saint-Gabriel de Rodrigues
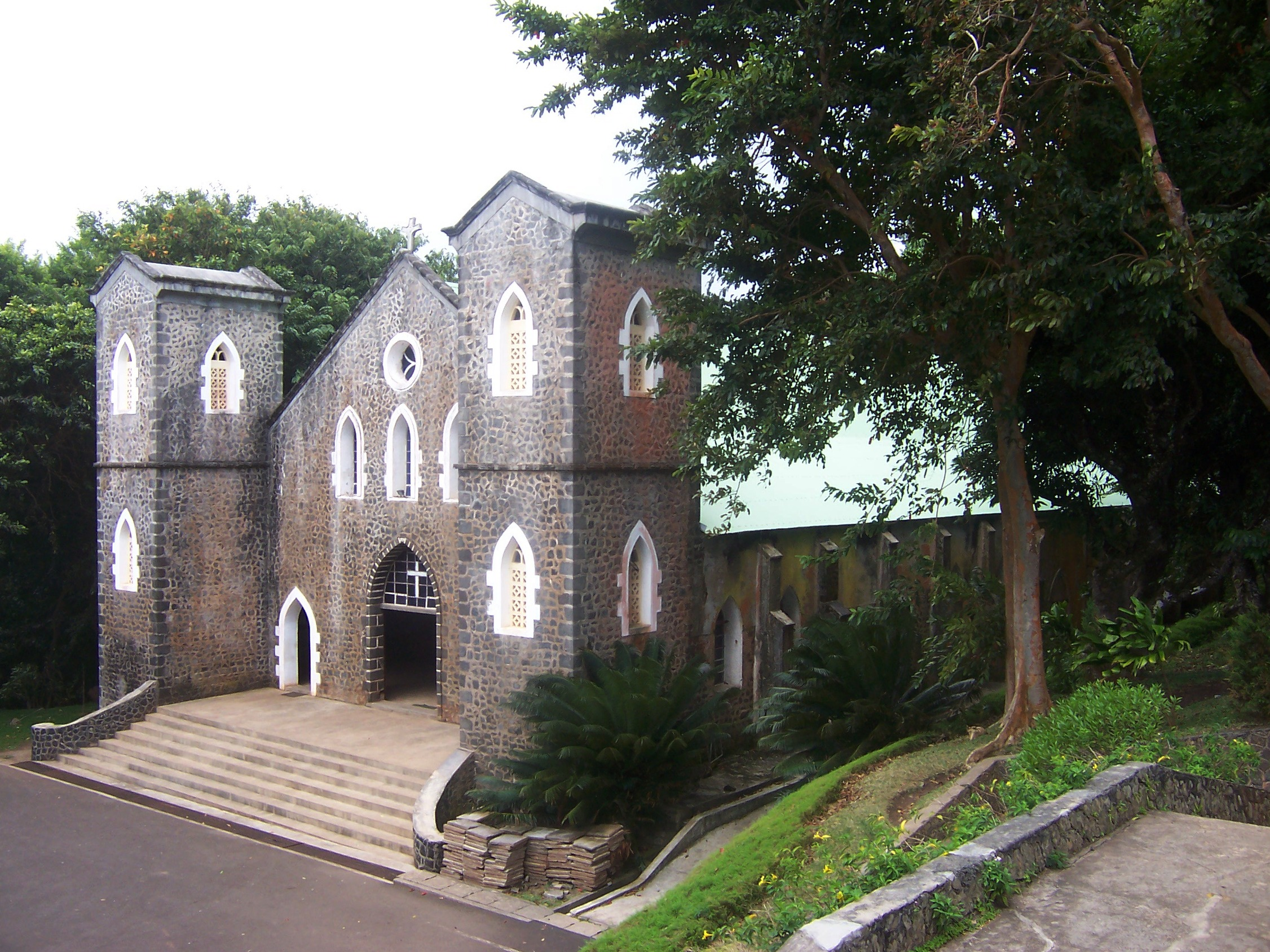
- St. Gabriel Cathedral
- Location: Rodrigues
- Country: Mauritius
- Denomination: Roman Catholic Church

The St. Gabriel Cathedral (French: Cathédrale Saint-Gabriel de Rodrigues) is a religious building that serves as the cathedral of the Catholic Church's Apostolic Vicariate of Rodrigues. It is located in the town of St. Gabriel (Saint Gabriel) on the island of Rodrigues, the third-largest island in the Mascarene archipelago, geographically part of the African island country of Mauritius.

It is the seat of the bishop of the Apostolic Vicariate of Rodrigues (Latin: Vicariatus Apostolicus Rodrigensis). Its construction began on October 18, 1936, and was completed on December 10, 1939 when the country was under British colonial rule.

== See also ==
- Roman Catholicism in Mauritius
- St. Gabriel
