= Notre Dame de L'Assomption Church, La Digue =

Catholic church in La Digue, Seychelles

- Eglise de Notre Dame de L'Assomption, La Digue
- Church of Our Lady of the Assumption, La Digue
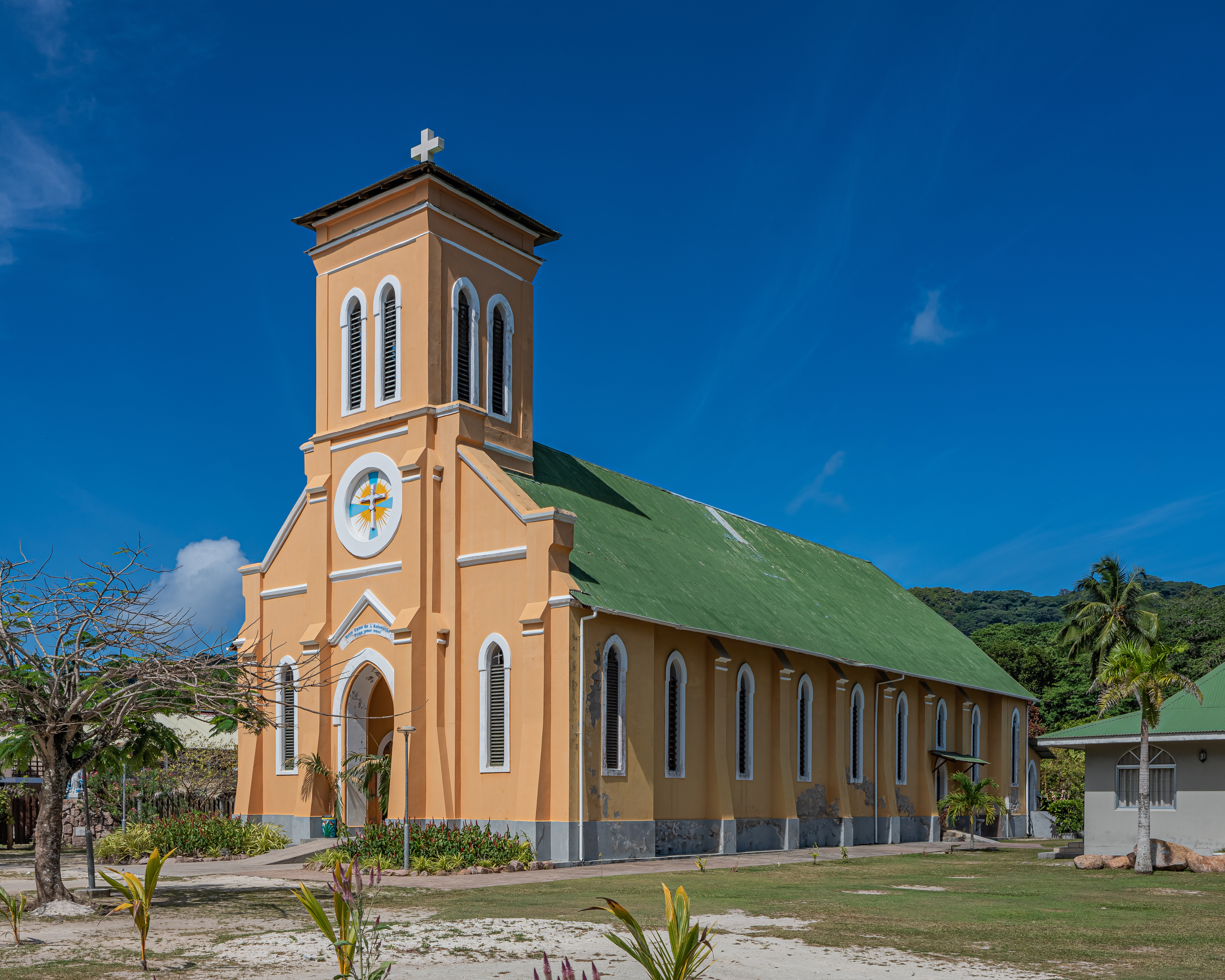
- Exterior view

- Location on the Seychelles
- 4.357356°S 55.826070°E
- Location: La Digue
- Country: Seychelles
- Denomination: Roman Catholic Church
- Churchmanship: Roman Catholic Diocese of Port Victoria

History
- Founder: Father Théophile Pollar
- Consecrated: 1854

Architecture
- Years built: 1854
- Groundbreaking: 1853

Administration
- Parish: La Digue

Clergy
- Bishop(s): Alain Harel, Bishop of Port Victoria

Notre Dame de L'Assomption Church is a Catholic Church in the island of La Digue, Seychelles.

== History ==
Father Théophile Pollar arrived on La Digue in October 1853, and laid the foundation of the church which was completed in 1854. In the next six years, he frequently traveled between La Digue and Praslin, for preaching and visiting lepers on Curieuse Island. In 1877, he established La Digue's First Mission school on the north side of the church complex. In 1889, Bishop Mouard brought the Sisters of St. Joseph of Cluny to La Digue, who contributed to the community's religious and educational development until their departure in 1944. The church itself underwent architectural changes during this time. In 1897, Bishop Hudrisier became the new pastor.

=== Renovation ===
Lately, the church was renovated by the Government of Seychelles in 1986 to preserve its historical significance. In 2022, the renovation of the Church and the Priest House was carried out by Red Crescent Society of the United Arab Emirates.

== Religious events ==
- Feast of Assumption, every year on August 15 (annual event).

== Map ==
1 Notre Dame de L'Assomption Church
2 The First Mission School / La Digue School
3 The Church's office
