= Victor Glover (judge) =

Chief Justice of Mauritius from 1988 to 1994

Sir Victor Glover

Mauritius Supreme Court Justice
- In office 1988–1994

Personal details
- Born: Victor Joseph Patrick Glover; 5 November 1932 England
- Died: 2 February 2020 (aged 87) Trou-aux-Biches, Mauritius
- Spouse: Ginette Gauthier
- Children: 2, including Gavin
- Education: Jesus College, Oxford
- Occupation: Lawyer

Sir Victor Joseph Patrick Glover (5 November 1932 – 2 February 2020) was a Mauritian lawyer, judge and Chief Justice who played an active role in legal and judicial matters on the island of Mauritius.

== Early life, education and family ==
Glover was born in England in 1932, the son of Mary Catherine Reddy "Mee" and Harold Joseph George Glover, when the latter was studying law at Middle Temple. Harold later became a Supreme Court judge, and was also Electoral Commissioner for two decades. Harold Glover was also Labour Party candidate at the 1936 General Elections.

He studied law (Jurisprudence) at Jesus College, Oxford University after being awarded a scholarship (laureate) at the end of his secondary education at Collège du Saint-Esprit in Mauritius.

Glover was married to Ginette Gauthier. Their sons Brian and Gavin are both barristers.

He died at the age of 87 on 2 February 2020.

== Career ==
In 1957 Glover was called to the Bar in England and Wales. He returned to his homeland Mauritius where he practised law as a barrister. Then in 1962 he started working at the Attorney General's office and eventually was promoted to the position of Parliamentary Counsel. At the age of 44 in 1976 and following his father's footsteps he became a Supreme Court judge. In 1982 he became Senior Puisne Judge. Eventually in 1988 in addition to be named Queen's Counsel (QC), Victor Glover was also promoted to the position of Chief Justice in succession to Sir Cassam Moollan who had retired. After 6 years as Glover eventually retired from public service in 1994 and Rajsoomer Lallah succeeded him as Chief Justice.

Starting from 1994 Glover worked as a legal adviser in a private legal firm in Mauritius. He was also a consultant for the Attorney General, drafting and reviewing legislative dossiers.

In 1987 Glover was the last judge to issue a death sentence in Mauritius before the death penalty was abolished, when he sentenced 33-year old Eshan Nayeck to death for the premeditated murder of Rashid Atchia on 23 July 1983 in Port Louis. However Glover was subsequently against the re-introduction of the death penalty in Mauritius.

== Recognition ==
In 1989 Glover was Knighted.

Glover was made an Honorary Professor of Law at the University of Mauritius.

He was made a Grand Officer of the Order of the Star and Key of the Indian Ocean (GOSK) in 1992.
