= St. Louis Cathedral, Port-Louis =

Coordinates: 20.1645°S 57.5065°E

St. Louis Cathedral
- Cathédrale Saint-Louis de Port-Louis
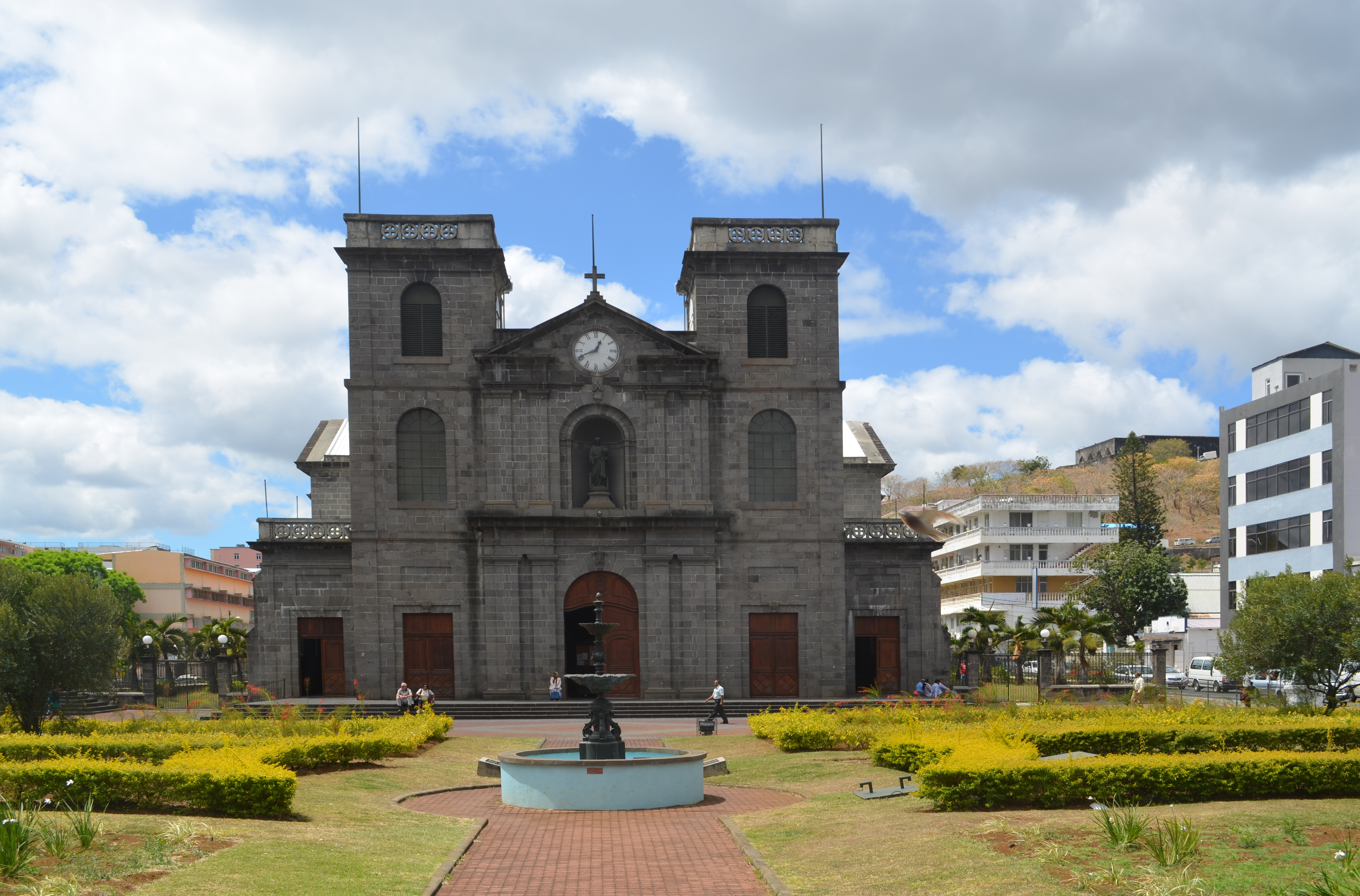
- St. Louis Cathedral
- Location: Port Louis
- Country: Mauritius
- Denomination: Roman Catholic Church

St. Louis Cathedral (French: Cathédrale Saint-Louis de Port-Louis, Mauritian Creole: Katedral Sin Lwi) is a Roman Catholic cathedral in Port Louis, Mauritius, the seat of the bishop of Port-Louis.

Several churches have been built in succession at this location. Between 1752 and 1756, Joseph-François Charpentier de Cossigny built the first, which soon fell apart, and then was hit by a cyclone in 1760. A new church collapsed again on April 9, 1773 as a result of another cyclone. A further reconstruction in 1782 soon ended in collapse. Subsequently, the building was restored in 1814 by Sir Robert Townsend Farquhar, the first British governor, until the same recurring structural problems reappeared in 1819. Bishop Jacques Leen rebuilt the structure from 1930 to 1933, and a final restoration was completed in 2007.

== See also ==
- Catholic Church in Mauritius
