= Deven Nagalingum =

Mauritian politician

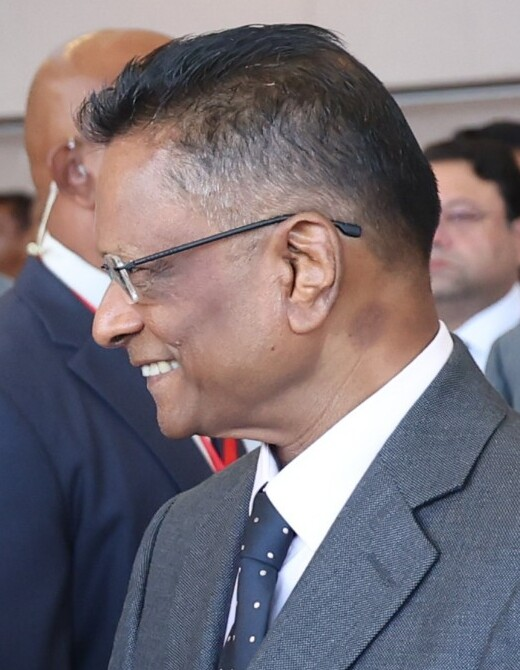
- Deven Nagalingum in 2025

Ministry of Youth and Sports
- Incumbent
- Assumed office 22 November 2024
- Preceded by: Stephan Toussaint

Personal details
- Party: Mauritian Militant Movement

Deven Nagalingum is a Mauritian politician from the Mauritian Militant Movement (MMM). He has served as Ministry of Youth and Sports since 2024.
