= Catholic Church in Seychelles =

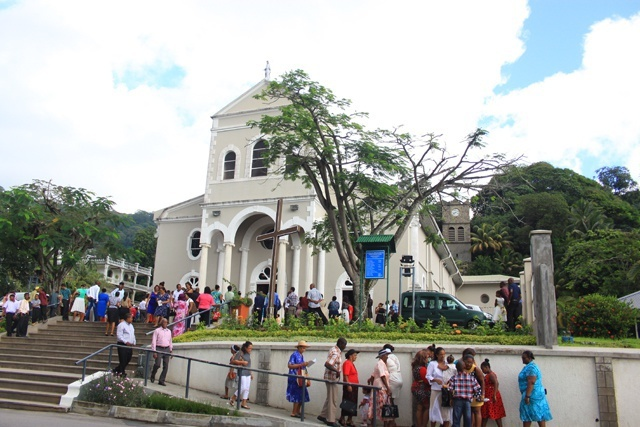
Immaculate Conception Cathedral, Seychelles

The Catholic Church has been active in Seychelles since the arrival of Léon des Avanchers in 1851. An apostolic prefecture administered by the Roman Catholic Diocese of Port-Louis was established in 1851, raised to an apostolic vicariate in 1880, and became the Roman Catholic Diocese of Port Victoria in 1892.

== History ==
=== Organisation ===
Léon des Avanchers, a member of the Order of Friars Minor Capuchin from Savoy, arrived in Victoria, Seychelles, on 1 March 1851. During his three-week visit he baptised hundreds of people. The Congregation for the Evangelization of Peoples placed the islands under the administration of the Roman Catholic Diocese of Port-Louis on 26 November 1852.

Pope Pius IX established an apostolic prefecture for the islands on 26 November 1852. It was raised to an apostolic vicariate on 5 April 1880, and then as the Roman Catholic Diocese of Port Victoria on 21 July 1892.

Two missionaries, Jérémie de Paglietta and Théophile, arrived on 20 September 1853. Paglietta was the first apostolic prefect. The Catholic Church acquired its first property in the Seychelles in 1879. L’Action Catholique was launched by Bishop Ernest Joye in 1935, the it was renamed to L’Écho des Îles in 1957.

An act of the Parliament of the United Kingdom incorporated the Catholic Church in the Seychelles in 1938. On 12 June 2000, the National Assembly voted to change the official name of the church from "The Mission of Seychelles" to "The Catholic Church in Seychelles".

=== People ===
Priests from the Order of Friars Minor Capuchin in Savoy served the area from the 1860s to 1922, when they were replaced by members of the order from Switzerland. The first three nuns, member of the Sisters of St. Joseph of Cluny, arrived on 15 January 1861. The Marist Brothers arrive on 4 January 1884.

Bishop Marc Hudrisier performed the Sacerdotal ordination in Seychelles on 19 September 1895, with the ordination of Jerome Pattoret. James Chang-Tave became the first priest from the Seychelles when he was ordained on 1 January 1950. Félix Paul became the first bishop from the Seycehlles with his appointment on 25 July 1975.

Bishop Marcel Olivier Maradan participated in the Second Vatican Council from 1962 to 1965.

Pope John Paul II visited the islands on 1 December 1986.

The Bible was translated into Seychellois Creole in 2015.

== Education ==
St. Louis College was established by Father Ignace Galfione in 1867, and has been administered by the Marist Brothers since 1881. During Hudrisier's tenure there were 23 Catholic schools in the islands with 2,129 students. All of the schools were nationalised by the government in 1981, but an agreement on 20 April 1999 recognised the church's ownership of these schools with a 99-year lease to the government.

== Population ==
Prempeh I and other leaders of the Asante Empire were sent into exile in the Seychelles. The Catholic Church unsuccessfully sought to convert them, but they chose to join the Church of England.

The 2022 census reported that around 70% of the population was Catholic.

== Division ==
- Roman Catholic Diocese of Port Victoria

== Leadership ==
- Marc Hudrisier - apostolic vicar (1890–1892) and bishop (1892–1910)
- Bernard Thomas Edward Clark - bishop (1910–1915)
- Louis-Justin Gumy - bishop (1921–1934)
- Marcel Olivier Maradan - bishop (1937–1972)
- Félix Paul - bishop (1975–1994)
- Gilbert Aubry - apostolic administrator (1994–1995)
- Xavier-Marie Baronnet - bishop (1995–2001)
- Denis Wiehe - bishop (2001—)

== See also ==
- Religion in Seychelles

== Works cited ==
=== Journals ===
- Akyeampong, Emmanuel (1999). "Christianity, Modernity and the Weight of Tradition in the Life of "Asantehene" Agyeman Prempeh I, c. 1888-1931". Africa. 69 (2). Cambridge University Press: 279–311. doi:10.2307/1161026. JSTOR 1161026.

=== News ===
- "The Catholic Diocese of Victoria is 125 years old". Seychelles Nation. 21 July 2017. Archived from the original on 13 July 2025.

=== Web ===
- "2023 Report on International Religious Freedom: Seychelles". United States Department of State. Archived from the original on 13 July 2025.
- "A Short History of Seychelles & the Diocese". Roman Catholic Diocese of Port Victoria. Archived from the original on 13 July 2025.
