= Michael Glover (Mauritian politician) =

Mauritian politician

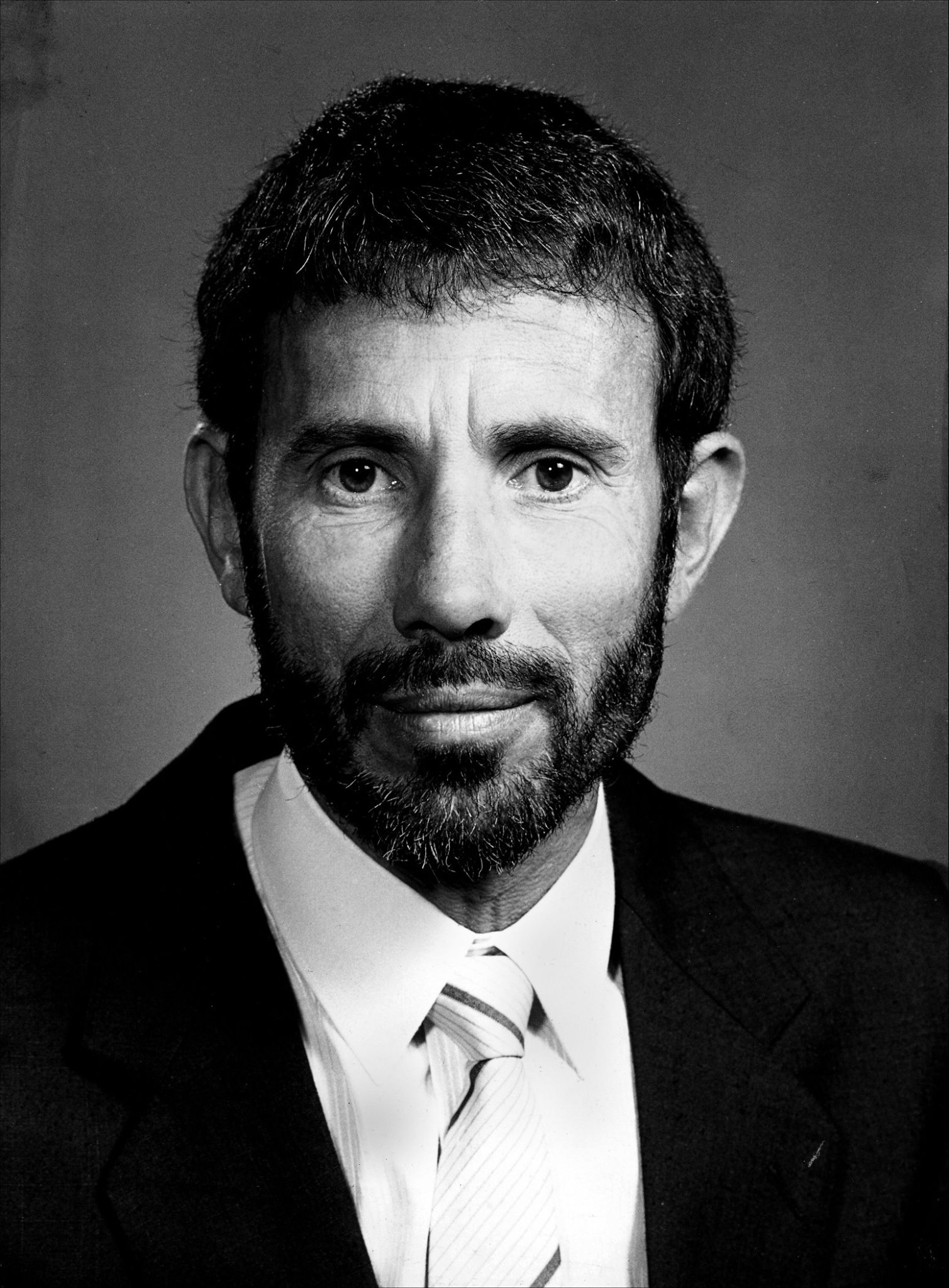
- Glover in 1983

Minister of Youth and Sports Youth, Sports and Tourism (1988–1991)
- In office 27 August 1983 – 22 December 1995
- Prime Minister: Anerood Jugnauth
- Preceded by: Sylvio Michel
- Succeeded by: Navin Soonarane

MP (Opposition)
- In office 1982–1983

Personal details
- Born: Mauritius
- Party: MSM, PTr

Michael James Kevin Glover (born 1940) is a Mauritian politician and former physical education instructor.

== Early life, education & career ==
Michael Glover worked as a Physical Education (PE) instructor at Collège du Saint-Esprit prior to his involvement in local politics as a member of the Population Générale community. He was also a soccer player for the Racing Club de Maurice located at Trianon.

== Political career ==
Michael Glover's political career started in Labour Party at the June 1982 General Elections. Although he was not elected in Constituency N°18 (Belle Rose and Quatre Bornes) as Labour-PMSD candidate he was nominated as Best Loser, thus making his first entry in the Legislative Assembly. He was part of the Opposition against the ruling coalition MMM-PSM of Bérenger and Boodhoo.

At the August 1983 general elections Michael Glover stood as candidate of the MSM-PTr coalition in Constituency N°18 and was elected to the Legislative Assembly. A few months earlier Michael Glover had been instrumental in the formation of this new coalition between the MSM and Labour Party.

He was again elected in Constituency N°18 at the August 1987 general elections after standing as candidate of the MSM-PTr coalition. Once again he had defeated Paul Berenger in the same constituency.

At the September 1991 general elections Michael Glover stood as candidate of the MSM-MMM coalition in Constituency N°18 and was once again elected to the Legislative Assembly.

- Current Position
- Named the CEO of the Mauritius sport complex in 2024 by the current government

== Honours ==
In May 2004, Glover was made honorary commander of the Royal Victorian Order, the first time any Mauritian had received the order since 1972. The British high commissioner to Mauritius, David Snoxell, presented the order to Glover.
