= Maurice Piat =

Mauritian Roman Catholic cardinal

His Eminence Maurice Piat CSSp GCSK
- Cardinal Bishop Emeritus of Port-Louis
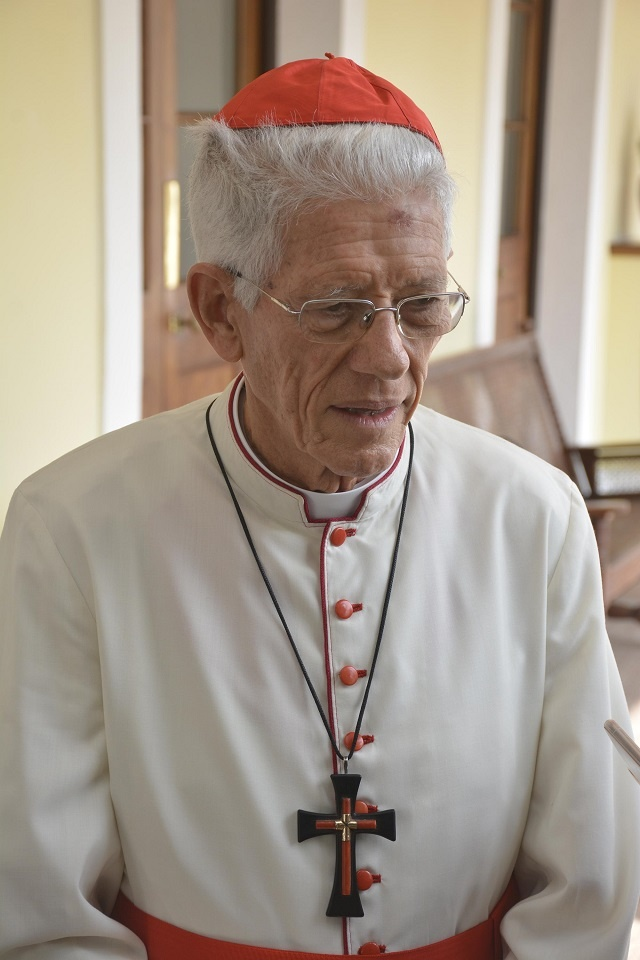
- Church: Roman Catholic Church
- Diocese: Port-Louis
- See: Port-Louis
- Appointed: 15 February 1993
- Term ended: 19 May 2023
- Predecessor: Jean Margéot
- Successor: Jean Michaël Durhône
- Other post: Cardinal-Priest of Santa Teresa al Corso d'Italia (2016-)
- Previous posts: Coadjutor Bishop of Port-Louis (1991–93); President of the Episcopal Conference of the Indian Ocean (1996–2002; 2013–16)

Orders
- Ordination: 2 August 1970 by Jean Margéot
- Consecration: 19 May 1991 by Jean Margéot
- Created cardinal: 19 November 2016 by Pope Francis
- Rank: Cardinal-Priest

Personal details
- Born: 19 July 1941 (age 85) Moka, Moka District, Mauritius
- Education: Collège du Saint-Esprit; Pontifical Gregorian University
- Motto: Pousse vers le large (Set out into the deep)
- Coat of arms: Maurice Piat's coat of arms

Styles of Maurice Piat
- Reference style: His Eminence
- Spoken style: Your Eminence
- Informal style: Cardinal

Ordination history of Maurice Piat
History
Episcopal consecration
- Principal consecrator: Jean Margéot
- Co-consecrators: Gilbert Aubry; Alphonsus Mathias; Maurice Couve de Murville
Cardinalate
- Elevated by: Pope Francis

Maurice Piat CSSp GCSK (born 19 July 1941) is a Mauritian prelate of the Catholic Church who was Bishop of Port Louis, Mauritius, from 1993 to 2023. He is a professed member of the Congregation of the Holy Spirit. Piat was ordained a priest in 1970 and made a bishop in 1991. Pope Francis made him a cardinal on 19 November 2016.

== Life ==
Maurice Piat was born in 1941 in Moka, Mauritius. He attended the Collège du Saint-Esprit, a middle and high school in Quatre Bornes. Upon graduating, he entered the novitiate of the Congregation of the Holy Spirit in County Tipperary, Ireland, where he made his solemn profession on 8 September 1962. While training at the Holy Ghost College, Kimmage Manor he obtained a bachelor's degree from University College Dublin. He studied for the priesthood in Rome, while residing at the Pontifical French Seminary. He was ordained a priest in Rome on 2 August 1970. He earned a licentiate in theology from the Pontifical Gregorian University in 1972. That same year he spent three months of pastoral ministry in Bangalore, India.

He returned to Mauritius and worked as a catechist and professor at his old college until 1982, when he was made responsible for seminarians at the Foyer Mgr Murphy in Vacoas. From 1977 until 1979 followed courses on diocesan formation at the Institut de formation des éducateurs du clergé (IFEC), in Paris. He returned to his homeland to serve as vicar of the parish of Saint-François-d'Assise in Pamplemousses from 1979 to 1985. He became the pastor of the parish of Coeur-Immaculé-de-Marie in Riviere-du-Rempart in 1986. From 1981 he was in charge of diocesan pastoral planning.

On 21 January 1991, Pope John Paul II named him the Coadjutor Bishop of the Roman Catholic Diocese of Port-Louis. He received his episcopal consecration on 19 May 1991 from Cardinal Jean Margéot. He chose as his motto "Pousse vers le large" ("Set out into the deep"), a saying of Christ in Luke's Gospel, when he orders Peter the fisherman to cast his net again after a day of unfruitful work . On 15 March 1993 he was appointed the eleventh Bishop of Port Louis and was installed that same year. Piat served as the President of the Episcopal Conference of the Indian Ocean from 1996 to 2002.

In March 2009 the government of Mauritius made him a Grand Officer of the Order of the Star and Key of the Indian Ocean (GOSK).

In 2015, Piat participated in the Synod on the Family.

He submitted his resignation as bishop on his 75th birthday as required by canon law. Pope Francis announced on 9 October 2016 that he would raise Piat to the rank of cardinal in a consistory on 19 November 2016. When created a cardinal on that date, he was made a Cardinal-Priest and assigned the titular church of Santa Teresa al Corso d'Italia. Mauritius has had only one cardinal before, Piat's immediate predecessor, Jean Margéot.

On 12 March 2017 the government of Mauritius awarded him its highest honour by making him a Grand Commander of Order of the Star and Key of the Indian Ocean (GCSK).

Pope Francis named him a member of the Dicastery for Promoting Integral Human Development on 23 December 2017.

Pope Francis accepted his resignation as bishop of Port-Louis on 19 May 2023, naming Jean Michaël Durhône his successor.

Catholic Church titles
Preceded by Jean Margeot	Bishop of Port Louis; 1993–present	Incumbent
Preceded by Laszlo Paskai	Cardinal Priest of Santa Teresa al Corso d'Italia; 2016–present	Incumbent
