= James Leen =

James Leen C.S.Sp.
- (Arch)Bishop of Port-Louis
- Church: Catholic Church
- Diocese: Diocese of Port-Louis
- In office: 16 April 1926 – 19 December 1949
- Predecessor: John Tuohill Murphy
- Successor: Daniel Liston
- Other post: Titular Archbishop of Phasis (1933-1949)
- Previous posts: Titular Bishop of Hippo Diarrhytus (1925-1926); Coadjutor Bishop of Port-Louis (1925-1926)

Orders
- Ordination: 11 July 1920
- Consecration: 13 September 1925 by David Keane

Personal details
- Born: 1888 Abbeyfeale, County Limerick, United Kingdom of Great Britain and Ireland
- Died: 19 December 1949 (aged 60–61)

James Leen C.S.Sp. (1888, Abbeyfeale – 19 December 1949) was an Irish member of the Congregation of the Holy Spirit, who served a Bishop of Port Louis in Mauritius.

Born in 1888 in Abbeyfeale, County Limerick he studied at Rockwell College County Tipperary. He entered Holy Ghost College, Kimmage Manor, to train for the Holy Ghost fathers, and studied at University College Dublin. Sent to Rome in 1915 he gained doctorates in philosophy and theology from the Pontifical Gregorian University.

Dr. Leen was ordained a priest in 1920. Returning to Ireland to teach in Kimmage and Blackrock College when theology studies were moved there. Ordained a co-adjuctor Bishop of Port Louis in 1925, succeeding as bishop in 1926. In 1933 he was awarded the personal title archbishop (Tiitular Archbishop of Phasis).

Archbishop James Leen died 19 December 1949. He was succeeded as bishop by fellow spiritan and Limerickman Bishop Daniel Liston.

Three of his brothers, Daniel, Edward(Ned), John(Jack) also became Holy Ghost Fathers. His older brother Edward Leen C.S.Sp., DD, who Jim followed into Rockwell College, Kimmage Manor, UCD, and the Gregorian University, served as president of Blackrock College and superior in Kimmage.
