= Xavier-Marie Baronnet =

Xavier-Marie Baronnet S.J.
- Bishop of Port Victoria
- Church: Catholic Church
- Diocese: Diocese of Port Victoria
- In office: 3 March 1995 – 1 June 2002
- Predecessor: Félix Paul
- Successor: Denis Wiehe

Orders
- Ordination: 7 October 1960
- Consecration: 25 June 1995 by Gilbert Aubry

Personal details
- Born: 5 April 1927 Chantenay-sur-Loire, Nantes, Loire-Inférieure, France
- Died: 8 September 2012 (aged 85) Paris, France

Xavier-Marie Baronnet S.J. (5 April 1927 in Chantenay, France – 8 September 2012 in Paris, France) was a Jesuit who served as Bishop of the Roman Catholic Diocese of Port Victoria (or Seychelles) from his appointment in 1995 until his retirement in 2002.

Baronnet was ordained a Catholic priest on 7 September 1960. He was appointed Bishop of Port Victoria, Seychelles on 3 March 1995 by Pope John Paul II. Baronnet was ordained on 25 June 1995, and served as Bishop until his retirement on 1 June 2002. He was succeeded by Bishop Denis Wiehe.

== See also ==
- Roman Catholicism in Seychelles
