= Santa Teresa, Rome =

Santa Teresa
- Basilica of Saint Teresa of Avila
- Basilica di Santa Teresa d'Avila
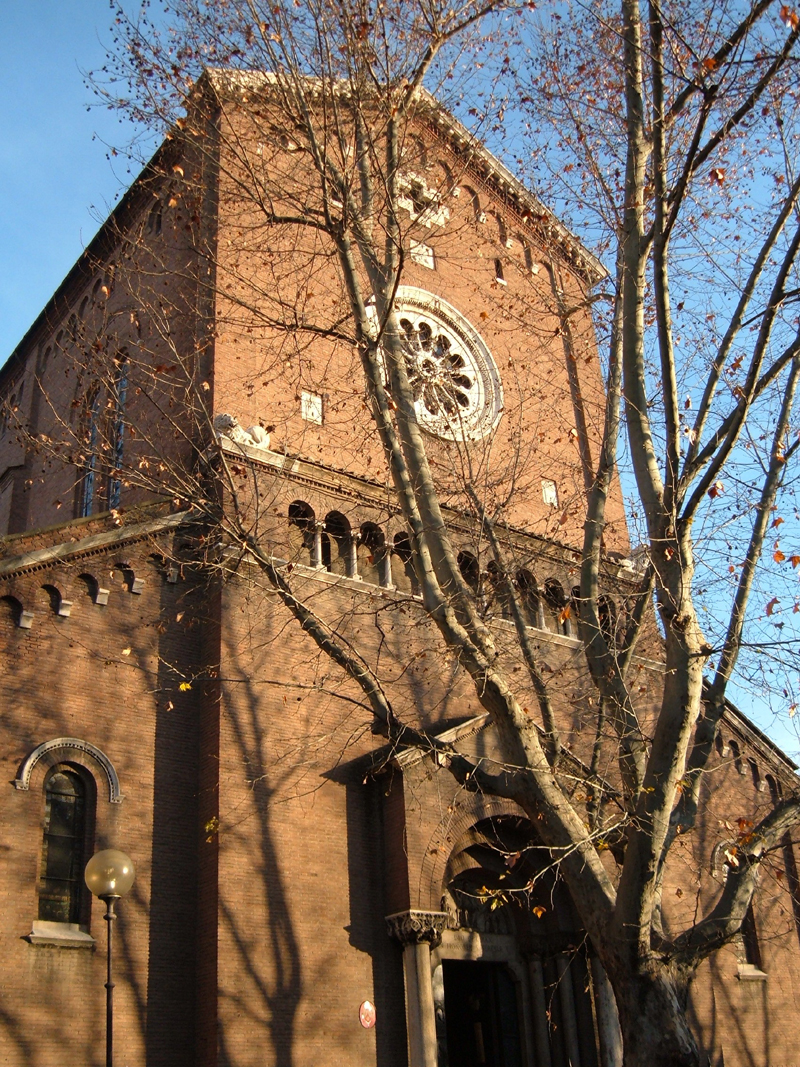
- Facade
- Click on the map for a fullscreen view
- 41.9115°N 12.4949°E
- Location: Corso d'Italia 37, Rome
- Country: Italy
- Language: Italian
- Denomination: Catholic
- Tradition: Roman Rite
- Religious order: Discalced Carmelites
- Website: basilica-parrocchiale-santa-teresa-davila.business.site

History
- Status: Minor basilica, titular church
- Founded: 1901
- Founder: Girolamo Maria Gotti
- Dedication: Teresa of Avila

Architecture
- Architectural type: Romanesque Revival

Administration
- Diocese: Rome

Santa Teresa d'Avila is a minor basilica, titular, and conventual church on the Corso d'Italia in Rome, Italy. It is dedicated to Teresa of Ávila and is the church of the General Curia of the Discalced Carmelites.

== History ==
It was founded by Cardinal Girolamo Gotti in 1901, designed in a Romanesque-Gothic hybrid style by Tullio Passarelli. In 1906 Pope Pius X made it a parish church and granted it to the Discalced Carmelites, who still have a generalate by the church and serve the church and its convent and parochial centre. Pope Pius XII elevated it to the status of basilica in 1951, and eleven years later Pope John XXIII made it a titular church, with Cardinal Giovanni Panico as its first titular cardinal.

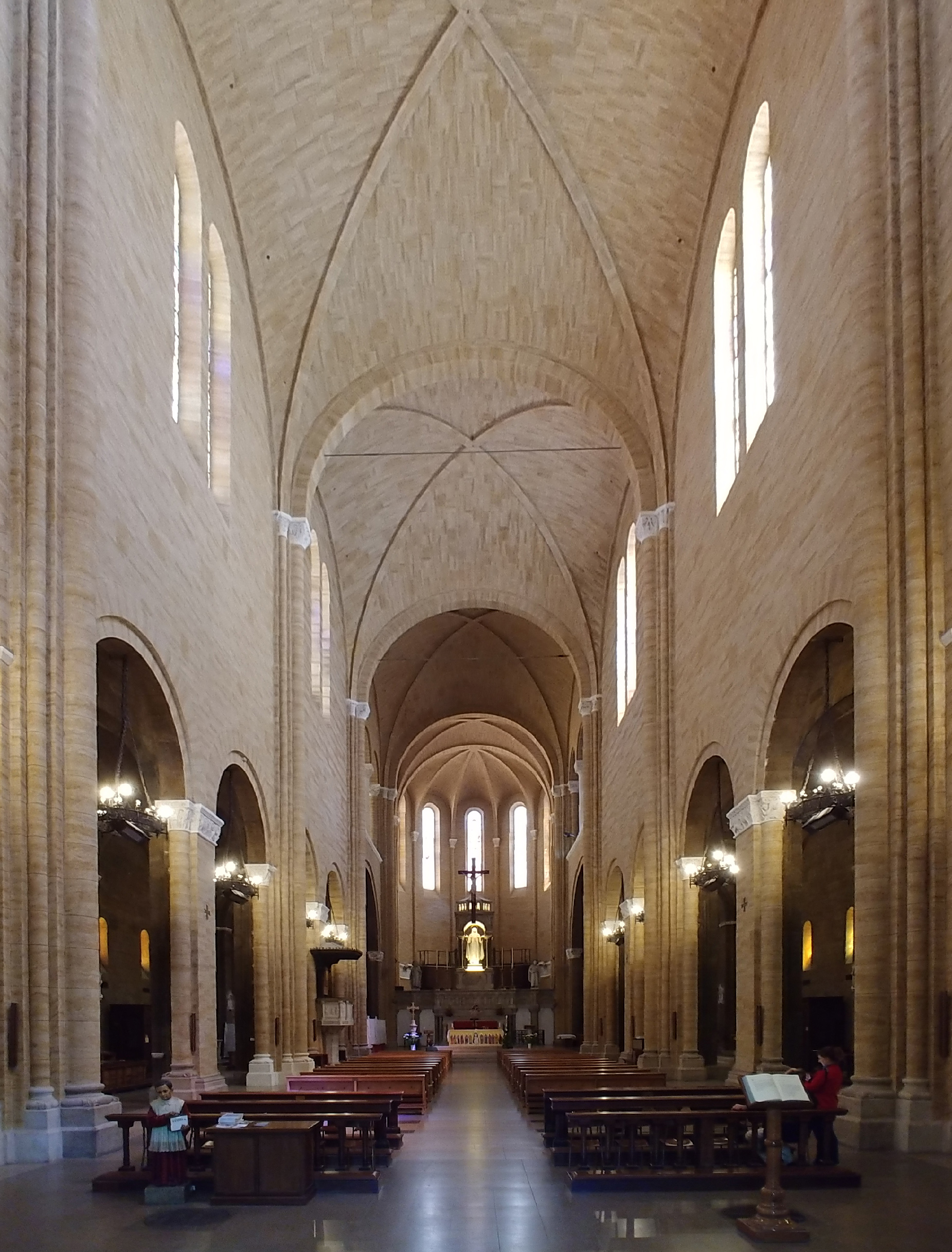
The interior of the church

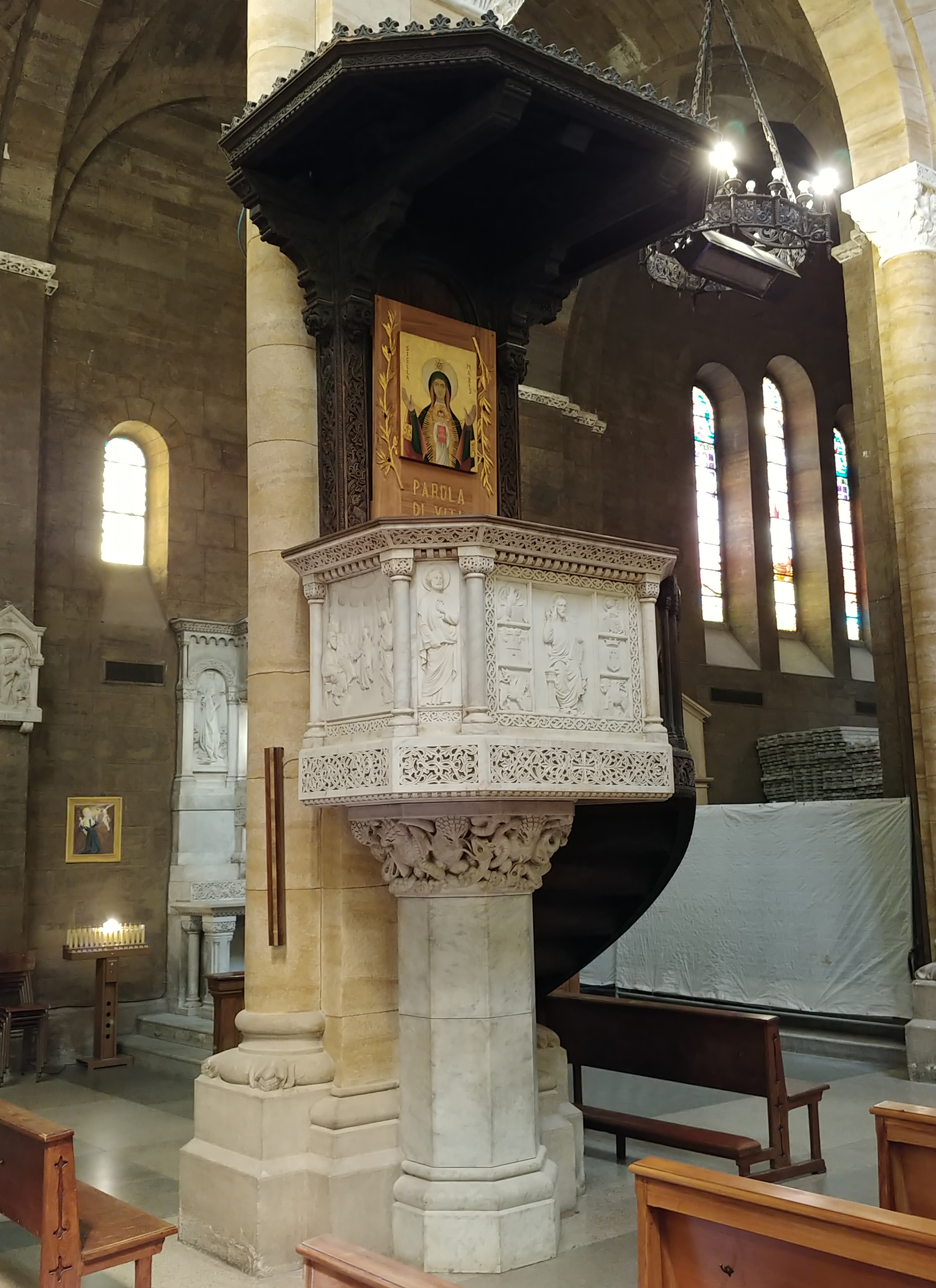
Pulpit

The tympanum above the main entrance door depicts Saint Teresa being blessed by Christ. The interior is decorated with works by 20th-century Roman artists, including a statue of Saint Teresa above the high altar.

== Burials ==
- Adeodato Giovanni Piazza
- Raffaele Rossi

== Cardinal-priests ==
- Adeodato Giovanni Piazza (1884-1957)
- Giovanni Panico (1962)
- Joseph-Marie Martin (1965–1976)
- László Lékai (1976–1986)
- László Paskai, O.F.M. (1988–2015)
- Maurice Piat, C.S.Sp. (2016–present)

Preceded by Santo Stefano al Monte Celio	Landmarks of Rome; Santa Teresa, Rome	Succeeded by San Vitale, Rome
