= Gavin Glover =

Mauritian lawyer and politician (born 1962)

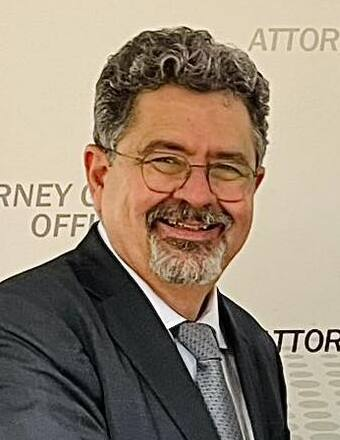
- Glover in 2025

Attorney-General of Mauritius
- Incumbent
- Assumed office 27 November 2024
- Prime Minister: Navin Ramgoolam
- Preceded by: Maneesh Gobin

Personal details
- Born: Gavin Patrick Cyril Glover; 26 April 1962 (age 64) British Mauritius
- Party: Labour
- Parent: Victor Glover (father)
- Education: Balliol College, Oxford
- Profession: Lawyer

Gavin Patrick Cyril Glover (born 26 April 1962) is a Mauritian lawyer and politician. He is currently serving as Attorney-General of Mauritius.

== Early life and legal career ==
Gavin Glover is the son of Victor Glover and Ginette Gauthier. His grandfather Harold was a judge and Electoral Commissioner. He attended Notre Dame des Victoires primary school in Rose-Hill, ranking at 399th position at the Standard 6 exit examinations of 1972. He then attended Collège du Saint-Esprit, and was awarded a State Scholarship also known as lauréat de la bourse d’Angleterre on 26 February 1980, which enabled him to study Law at Balliol College, Oxford.

Soon after his return to Mauritius in 1985, Gavin's father assisted him to find employment in Ivan Collendavelloo's legal practice. He founded the firm Glover Chambers later in 1985, and was involved in a number of high profile cases such as the defence of drug trafficker Hassen Jeewooth in 1996, Bacha Castellano house fire, Bernard Maigrot's defence when charged with the murder of his mistress Vanessa Lagesse on 10 March 2001, Thierry Lagesse's defence when he was arrested and charged with tax evasion during the importation of a luxury Mercedes Benz SLS 63 AMG in 2010, Johnson Roussety's defence when he was prosecuted for corruption during a recruitment scandal, and Navin Ramgoolam's defence when he was arrested in February 2015 during Opération Lakaz Lerwa Lion for the Rs 220 millions Navin Coffers’ Saga and Rolex Roches Noires Affair involving conspiracy, murder, and death in custody of Anand Ramdhony.

== Political career ==
Although he was not a candidate of any party during the November 2024 general elections, Gavin Glover was nominated as Attorney-General by Navin Ramgoolam by 19 November 2024. He was sworn in office on Friday 29 November 2024 at Le Réduit in front of outgoing President Pradeep Roopun, several days after the new cabinet's main ceremony given that Glover was still representing his childhood friend Bernard Maigrot, who had been convicted in August 2024 of Vanessa Lagesse's murder in March 2001. A few days later Chief Justice Rehana Mungly-Gulbul issued a Communiqué to express her disappointment for not having been invited to that ceremony.

== Controversies ==
=== Mosque noise pollution ===
In 2007, Gavin Glover made news headlines for several weeks following his court action against the Municipality of Quatre-Bornes. Glover was seeking a court order against the municipality to enforce its powers under the Noise Protection Act and associated regulations regarding the use of amplifiers and loudspeakers by the mosque in its daily Azaan calls to prayers. This led judge Paul Lam Shang Leen to rule that the use of loudspeakers and amplification outside the Hidayat-E-Islam mosque in a residential area of Quatre-Bornes for Azaan to be unlawful, and to be a breach of Noise Prevention Regulations (1939 et 1955). As a result, a large crowd of about 800 protesters assembled in front of Gavin Glover's house and another group was preparing further protests in front of the National Assembly. To prevent further escalation, various politicians intervened.

Political offices
Preceded by Maneesh Gobin	Attorney-General of Mauritius; 2024–present	Incumbent
