= Ministry of Youth and Sports (Mauritius) =

Government ministry of Mauritius

- Ministère de la Jeunesse et des Sports

Agency overview
- Formed: 1969
- Jurisdiction: Government of Mauritius
- Headquarters: Citadelle Mall, Port Louis
- Ministers responsible: Deven Nagalingum, Minister of Youth and Sports; Karen Foo Kune, Junior Minister
- Agency executive: Marie Joseph Ramsamy, Permanent Secretary
- Website: mys.govmu.org

The Ministry of Youth and Sports (French: Ministère de la Jeunesse et des Sports) is a ministry in the government of Mauritius responsible for youth and sports.

Deven Nagalingum of the Mauritian Militant Movement is the incumbent minister since November 2024, having been appointed by prime minister Navin Ramgoolam under his fourth government. Karen Foo Kune serves as the junior minister for the ministry.

== History ==
Following the coalition government between the Labour Party and the Parti Mauricien Social Démocrate in December 1969, the ministry of Youth and Sports was established for the first time. Raymond Rault from the Labour Party became its first minister. He would remain in office until 1971, when he was replaced by Dayanundlall Basant Rai. Basant Rai would served as minister until 1976, when he was replaced by Hurrydew Ramchurn.

Under Anerood Jugnauth's first government, Diwakur Bundhun of the Mauritian Militant Movement was appointed as minister until he resigned in March 1983 after a mass resignation triggered by a split within the coalition government. Sylvio Michel would replace him and in turn would serve until August 1983.

Michael Glover, a physical education teacher by profession, from the Labour Party became minister and would hold the office for the entirety of Jugnauth's first stint as prime minister until 1995. He was the longest-serving minister. The ministry's portfolio title was modified in 1988 after the tourism portfolio was transferred to Glover and became known as the ministry of Youth, Sports and Tourism until 1991 when it reverted back to its original title.

In 2019, the ministry's portfolio title was once more modified to Youth Empowerment, Sports and Recreation under Pravind Jugnauth's second government. The focus of the youth section of the ministry was modified to youth empowerment. Stephan Toussaint, who was appointed in 2017 under Pravind's first government, remained in office as minister until 2024.

Deven Nagalingum was appointed as minister by Navin Ramgoolam in November 2024 and subsequently, the ministry's portfolio title reverted to simply the ministry of Youth and Sports.

== Responsibilities ==
Within the sports area, the ministry is responsible for the promotion of sports and ensure opportunity for all citizens to practice any sports whether for recreation or competition. The creation and development of sports infrastructure and facilities are also within its responsibilities. The ministry also provides incentives, whether financial or technical, to athletes to participate in various competitions at various levels and to sport federations within the country for promotion and development of their respective disciplines.

The ministry's responsibilities for the youth include providing opportunities for them to develop their personal and social skills and empower their leadership skills. Psychological and economic empowerment, with special emphasis on mental, emotional, innovation and entrepreneurial aspects, are espoused by the ministries through various youth programmes.

== Organisation ==
=== Departments ===
The ministry is divided between two departments:

- Sports Section
- Youth Section

=== Bodies ===
==== Youth Section ====
- National Youth Council (NYC)
- Mauritius Recreation Council

==== Sports Section ====
- Sports Medical Unit
- National Anti-Doping Organisation of Mauritius (NADO Mauritius)
- Club Maurice Company Ltd
- Mauritius Sports Council
- Trust Fund for Excellence in Sports (TFES)
- Commission Nationale du Sport Féminin (CNSF)

== List of ministers ==
Portrait	Name	Term of office		Portfolio name	Party	Prime minister	Ref.
Portrait	Name	Took office	Left office	Portfolio name	Party	Prime minister	Ref.
	Raymond Rault	27 December 1969	August; 1971	Youth and Sports	PTr	S. Ramgoolam	
	Dayanundlall Basant Rai	August; 1971	27 December 1976	Youth and Sports	PTr	S. Ramgoolam	
	Hurrydew Ramchurn	27 December 1976	15 June 1982	Youth and Sports	PTr	S. Ramgoolam	
	Diwakur Bundhun	15 June 1982	22 March 1983	Youth and Sports	MMM	A. Jugnauth	
	Sylvio Michel	28 March 1983	27 August 1983	Youth and Sports	MMM	A. Jugnauth	
	Sylvio Michel	28 March 1983	27 August 1983	Youth and Sports	MSM	A. Jugnauth	
	Michael Glover	27 August 1983	15 August 1988	Youth and Sports	PTr	A. Jugnauth	
	Michael Glover	15 August 1988	27 September 1991	Youth, Sports and Tourism	MSM	A. Jugnauth	
	Michael Glover	27 September 1991	22 December 1995	Youth and Sports	MSM	A. Jugnauth	
	Navin Soonarane	30 December 1995	25 October 1998	Youth and Sports	PTr	N. Ramgoolam	
	Marie Claude Arouff-Parfait	25 October 1998	15 September 2000	Youth and Sports	PTr	N. Ramgoolam	
	Ravi Yerrigadoo	18 September 2000	5 July 2005	Youth and Sports	MSM	A. Jugnauth	
	Ravi Yerrigadoo	18 September 2000	5 July 2005	Youth and Sports	MSM	Bérenger	
	Sylvio Tang	7 July 2005	13 September 2008	Youth and Sports	PTr	N. Ramgoolam	
	Devanand Ritoo	13 September 2008	13 December 2014	Youth and Sports	PTr	N. Ramgoolam	
	Yogida Sawmynaden	15 December 2014	23 January 2017	Youth and Sports	MSM	A. Jugnauth	
	Stephan Toussaint	23 January 2017	12 November 2019	Youth and Sports	MSM	P. Jugnauth	
	Stephan Toussaint	12 November 2019	12 November 2024	Youth Empowerment, Sports and Recreation	MSM	P. Jugnauth	
	Deven Nagalingum	22 November 2024	Incumbent	Youth and Sports	MMM	N. Ramgoolam	
