= Catholic Church in Mauritius =

The Catholic Church in Mauritius is part of the worldwide Catholic Church, under the spiritual leadership of the Pope in Rome.

According to the 2011 census, Catholics made up 26.3% of the total population (324,811 people). In 2022, Catholics made up 24.9% from Mauritius's population.

The country is divided into two territorial jurisdictions:

- Port-Louis
- Vicariate Apostolic of Rodrigues

In 2020, there were 99 priests and 171 nuns serving 48 parishes.

== Catholicism by district ==
| Rank | District | % Catholic | % Christian |
|---|---|---|---|
| 1 | Rodrigues | 90,9 | 97,7 |
| 2 | Black River | 45,9 | 56,6 |
| 3 | Port Louis | 34,7 | 41,4 |
| 4 | Plaines Wilhems | 28,9 | 36,8 |
| 5 | Savanne | 19,4 | 24,1 |
| 6 | Pamplemousses | 19,4 | 25,1 |
| 7 | Grand Port | 17,8 | 23,4 |
| 8 | Rivière du Rempart | 15,8 | 25,1 |
| 9 | Flacq | 15,0 | 19,7 |
| 10 | Moka | 13,4 | 18,1 |

== Catholicism by populated places ==
List of places in Mauritius with a Roman Catholic population of at least 50.0% of the total population.

| Rank | Place Name | District | Roman-Catholics | Percentage |
|---|---|---|---|---|
| 1 | Marechal | Rodrigues | 5,351 | 94.0% |
| 2 | Saint Gabriel | Rodrigues | 7,013 | 93,6% |
| 3 | Grande Montagne | Rodrigues | 6,093 | 92.8% |
| 4 | Baie aux Huîtres | Rodrigues | 5,425 | 89.3% |
| 5 | La Ferme | Rodrigues | 6,108 | 88.5% |
| 6 | Port Mathurin | Rodrigues | 6,762 | 87.8% |
| 7 | Case Noyale | Rivière Noire | 1,311 | 77.0% |
| 8 | Le Morne | Rivière Noire | 881 | 67.8% |
| 9 | Albion | Rivière Noire | 3,253 | 62.5% |
| 10 | Baie du Tombeau | Pamplemousses | 9,037 | 61.5% |
| 11 | Tamarin | Rivière Noire | 2,316 | 61.5% |
| 12 | Grande Rivière Noire | Rivière Noire | 1,578 | 59.1% |
| 13 | Bel Ombre | Savanne | 1,419 | 58.7% |
| 14 | Baie du Cap | Savanne | 1,332 | 55.8% |
| 15 | La Gaulette | Rivière Noire | 1,221 | 52.7% |
| 16 | Bambous Virieux | Grand Port | 750 | 50.1% |

== See also ==
- Christianity in Mauritius
- List of saints from Africa
