= Gabrielle Wiehe =

Mauritian illustrator and graphic designer

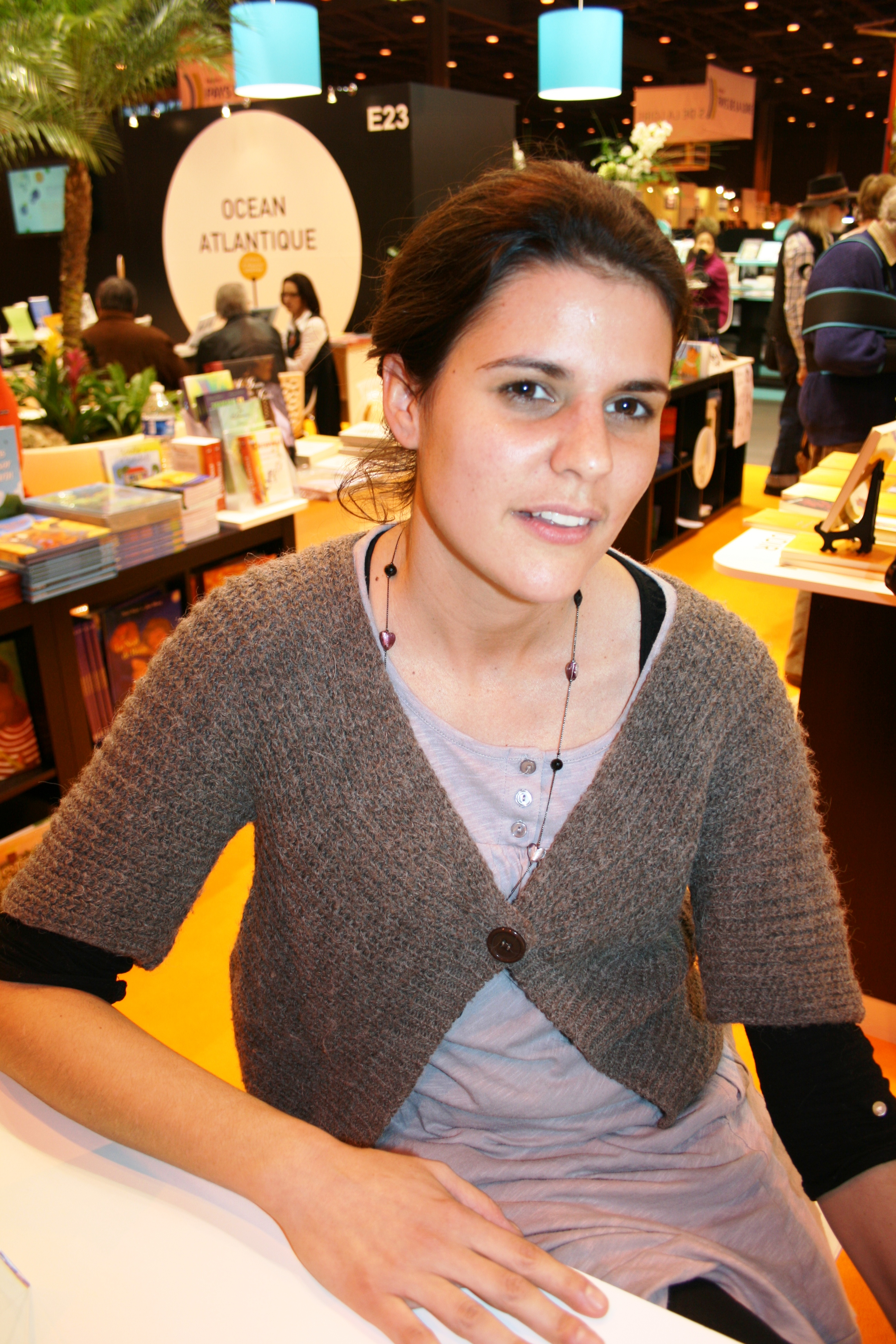
- Born: 14 July 1980 (age 45); Moka, Mauritius
- Occupations: Illustrator and graphic designer

Gabrielle Wiehe (born 14 July 1980) is a Mauritian illustrator and graphic designer.

== Biography ==
Gabrielle Wiehe was born in Moka, Mauritius on 14 July 1980. Her father Jacques was an architect from the Wiehe family, whose origins could be traced to Denmark. A notable figure in her family at the time she was growing up was Christian William Wiehe, the architect of Château de Labourdonnais. Her brother Johann Wiehe is also an architect and co-authored her biography in 2010. In addition to her famous family member, the first cousin of her father, Ernest Wiehe, was also a famous Mauritian saxophonist.

After graduating from Lycée Labourdonnais in Mauritius, Gabrielle moved to Metropolitan France in 1998 and started studying graphic design in Paris that same year. Graduate of the school intuit lab in 2002, she published the following year a book at Mango Jeunesse in which she illustrates The Puss in Boots and The Fairies, two tales by Charles Perrault. She had previously published a first book titled Bestioles, which only appeared in 2005 at L'atelier du poisson soluble.
