= Collège du Saint-Esprit =

Collège du Saint Esprit
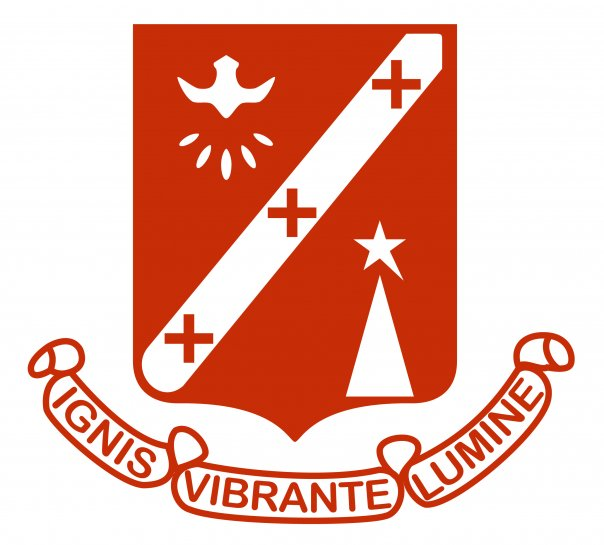
- Collège du Saint Esprit badge

Location
- Sir Virgil Naz Avenue, Quatre Bornes; Quatre Bornes; Mauritius; 20.266173°S 57.470130°E

Information
- Type: Secondary school
- Motto: Ignis Vibrante Lumine (The Fire Is The Most Vibrant Light)
- Religious affiliation: Catholic
- Established: 1938; 88 years ago
- Chairman: Jean Edmond Maurel; Jose Carmagnole
- Rector: Annelise Lafrance
- Classes: Form 1 - Upper 6
- Average class size: depends for lower and upper around 25
- Language: English, French, Creole
- Colour
- Slogan: Mens sana in corpore sano (Latin); A healthy mind remains in a healthy body
- Song: Cheers to you College Saint Esprit
- Website: collegedusaintesprit.org

The Collège du Saint Esprit is a state funded private catholic secondary school in Mauritius. It is one of the most prestigious and competitive secondary education institutions in the country. The school consists of a boys-only department in Quatre Bornes where students are prepared for the School Certificate, the Higher School Certificate and other courses

== History ==
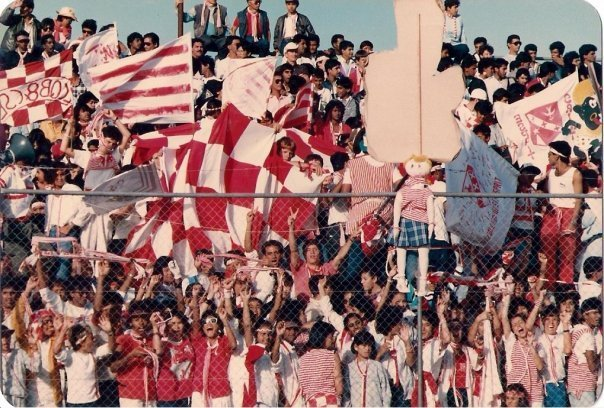
Students during the sport day

The secondary school was founded in January 1938 by Fathers of the Congregation of The Holy Spirit. In 1920, The 'Séminaire Père Laval' was inaugurated and in 1926 'le Collège Père Laval' was founded with priests as teachers. However, due to a lack of priests, 'le Collège Père Laval' closed its doors and it was only in 1938 that the college re-opened its doors as le Collège du Saint Esprit. In 1950, the college obtained its first laureate (Roland LAMUSSE). In 1972, l’Abbé Adrien WIEHE became the first Mauritian rector of the school and four years later there was the beginning of the secular administration with Mr Cyril LECKNING as rector of the college. The second secular rector was Mr Raymond RIVET in 1987 who was then succeeded by Mr Georges HO WAN KAU in 1995. Mr Jacques MALIE became Rector in 2000.

=== Summary of the history of the college ===
- 1920 - Le Séminaire Père Laval was inaugurated.
- 1926 - le Collège Père Laval was founded.
- 1930 - Due to a lack of priests, le Collège Père Laval closed its doors.
- 1938 - Le Collège Père Laval became le Collège du Saint Esprit.
- 1950 - First laureate: Roland LAMUSSE.
- 1972 - First Mauritian Rector: l’Abbé Adrien WIEHE.
- 1976 - Beginning of the secular administration, Mr Cyril LECKNING, Rector.
- 1987 - Mr Raymond RIVET, 2nd secular rector.
- 1995 - Mr Georges HO WAN KAU, is nominated Rector and Mr Edmond MAUREL, Manager.
- 2000 - Mr Jacques MALIE became Rector.
- 2003 - The C.S.E Junior School became le Collège Saint Louis.
- 2005 - The Collège Saint Louis is dissolved and C.S.E Junior School is reinstated.
- 2016 - Mr Lindsay Thomas becomes Rector following retirement of Mr Jacques Malié as Rector
- 2017 - First Mauritian High School to participate in Google Code-in 5 students participated Neel GOPAUL, Nigel YONG, Heesen PONNUSAWMY, Heervesh LALLBAHADUR and Ashmith Kifah Sheik MEERAN. The last 2 being finalists for Drupal: .
- 2020 - Mrs Dominique Séblin becomes first female Rector following transfer of Mr Lindsay Thomas

== C.S.E Junior School ==
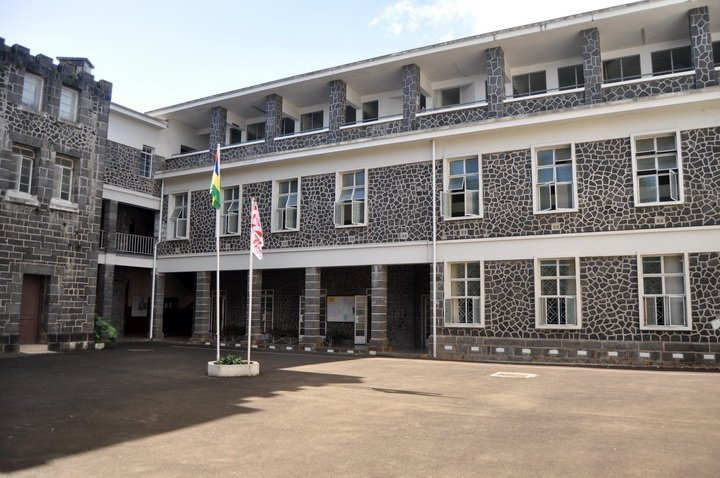
The old building

The C.S.E Junior School welcomes students after their admission till form 4 and students then complete their study from form 5 to Upper 6 at the old building which is the central branch. The college also accepts high-graded students who just finished their School Certificate and want to complete their study Higher School Certificate at the Collège du Saint Esprit.

== Notable alumni and teachers ==
- Paul Bérenger, former Prime Minister of Mauritius and former Opposition Leader
- Maurice Piat, Cardinal and Bishop of Port-Louis
- Victor Glover, former Chief Justice
- Gavin Patrick Cyril Glover, Senior Counsel, Attorney General
- Rudyard (Rudy) Soobaroyen, CFA, Economics Advisory
- Shakeel Mohamed, former Minister and lawyer
- Michael James Kevin Glover, former Minister
- Yogida Sawmynaden, former Minister

== See also ==
- Education in Mauritius
- List of secondary schools in Mauritius
