= Immaculate Conception Cathedral, Seychelles =

Catholic cathedral in Seychelles

Coordinates: 4.6198°S 55.4516°E

Immaculate Conception Cathedral
- Cathédrale de l'Immaculée-Conception de Victoria
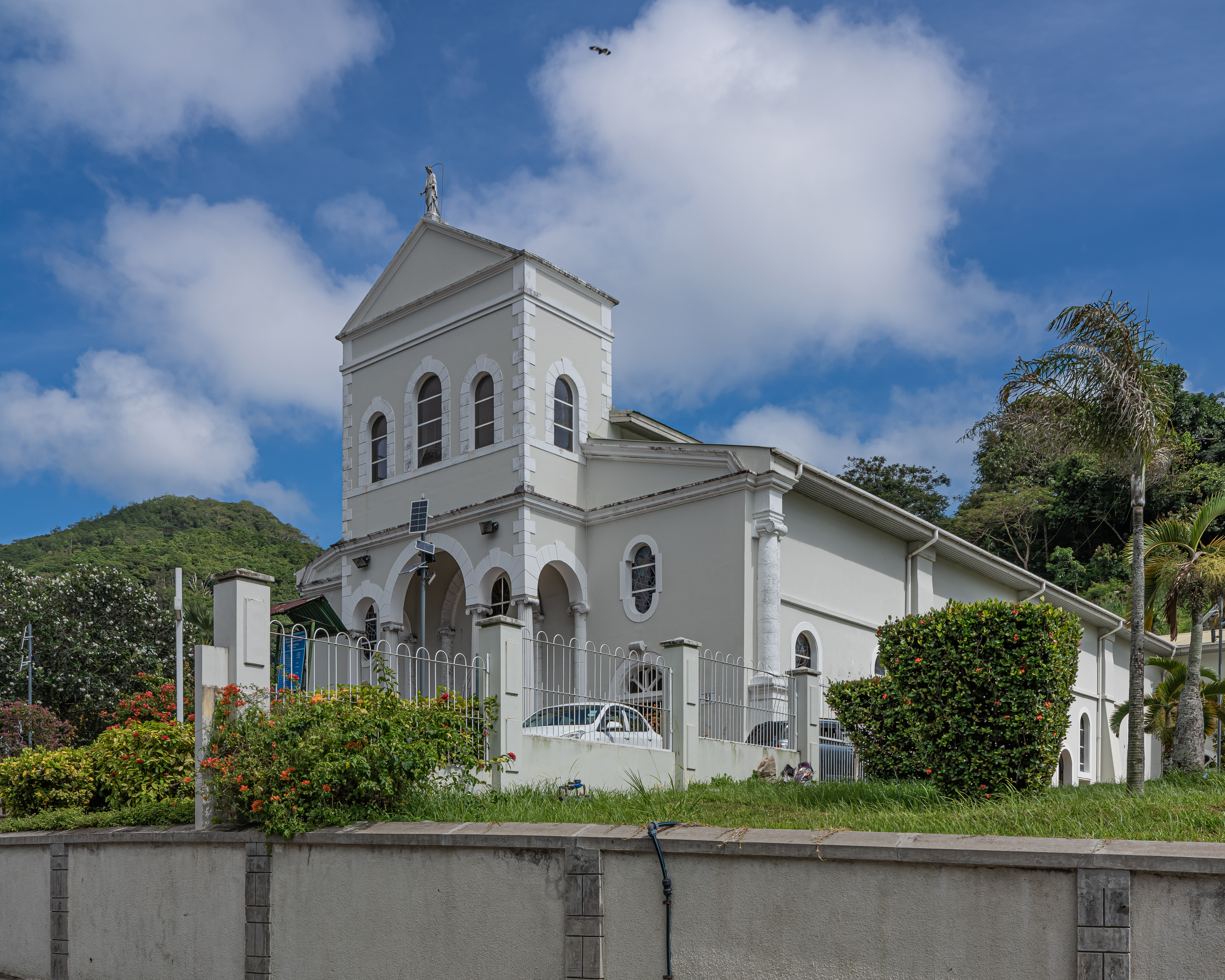
- Immaculate Conception Cathedral
- Location: Victoria
- Country: Seychelles
- Denomination: Catholic Church
- Sui iuris church: Latin Church

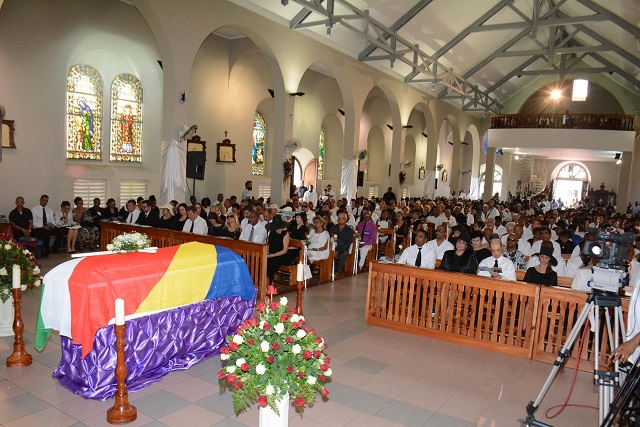
The memorial service for James Mancham, the first President of Seychelles, in Immaculate Conception Cathedral on 12 January 2017

The Immaculate Conception Cathedral (French: Cathédrale de l'Immaculée-Conception de Victoria) or simply Cathedral of Victoria, is a religious building of the Catholic Church located in the town of Victoria, on the island of Mahé capital of the African archipelago nation of Seychelles.

== History ==
The church was built in 1874 and recalls the French colonial style.

It is part of the Latin Church, and serves as the seat of the bishop of the Diocese of Port Victoria which was established in 1892 by Pope Leo XIII. The first reconstruction of the cathedral started in the same year.

== Location ==
The cathedral is located near the Clock Tower (Tour de l'Horloge) and the Anglican Cathedral.

== See also ==
- Roman Catholicism in Seychelles
