= Denis Wiehe =

Denis Wiehe C.S.Sp.
- Bishop Emeritus of Port Victoria
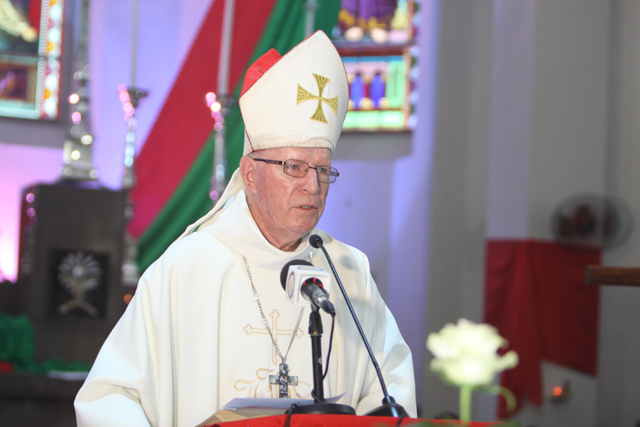
- Church: Catholic Church
- Diocese: Diocese of Port Victoria
- In office: 1 June 2002 – 10 September 2020
- Predecessor: Xavier-Marie Baronnet
- Successor: Alain Harel
- Previous post: Coadjutor Bishop of Port Victoria (2001-2002)

Orders
- Ordination: 17 August 1969
- Consecration: 15 August 2001 by Xavier-Marie Baronnet

Personal details
- Born: 21 May 1940 (age 86) Curepipe, Mauritius, British Empire

Denis Wiehe C.S.Sp. (born 21 May 1940 Curepipe, Mauritius) is the former Bishop of the Roman Catholic Diocese of Port Victoria, Seychelles, where he is now bishop emeritus. He succeeded Bishop Xavier-Marie Baronnet in 2002.

Wiehe was ordained a Catholic priest within the Holy Ghost Fathers on 17 August 1969. He was first appointed a coadjutor bishop of the Diocese of Port Victoria on 24 April 2001. On 1 June 2002 Wiehe was elevated to Bishop of the Port Victoria, succeeding Bishop Baronnet, who retired.

On 10 September 2020, his resignation was accepted by Pope Francis, while Bishop Alain Harel, the Vicar Apostolic of Rodrigues in Mauritius, was appointed as his successor.

== See also ==
- Roman Catholicism in Seychelles
