= Sheikh Mohamed bin Khalifa Mosque =

Mosque in Mont Fleuri, Victoria, Seychelles

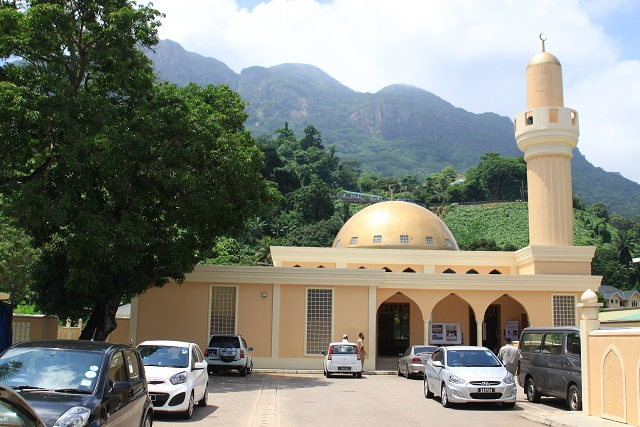

- Location within Seychelles

Religion
- Affiliation: Islam

Location
- Location: Bel Air, Victoria, Seychelles
- Interactive map of Sheikh Mohamed bin Khalifa Mosque
- Coordinates: 4°37′32″S 55°27′09″E

Architecture
- Type: mosque
- Established: 1982
- Capacity: 600 worshipers

The Sheikh Mohamed bin Khalifa Mosque is a mosque in Bel Air, Victoria, Seychelles.

== History ==
The mosque was built in September 1982, making it the first mosque in the country. In 2013, it underwent renovation.

== Architecture ==
The mosque features a golden dome. It has a capacity of 600 worshipers.

== See also ==
- Islam in Seychelles
