= Islam in Seychelles =

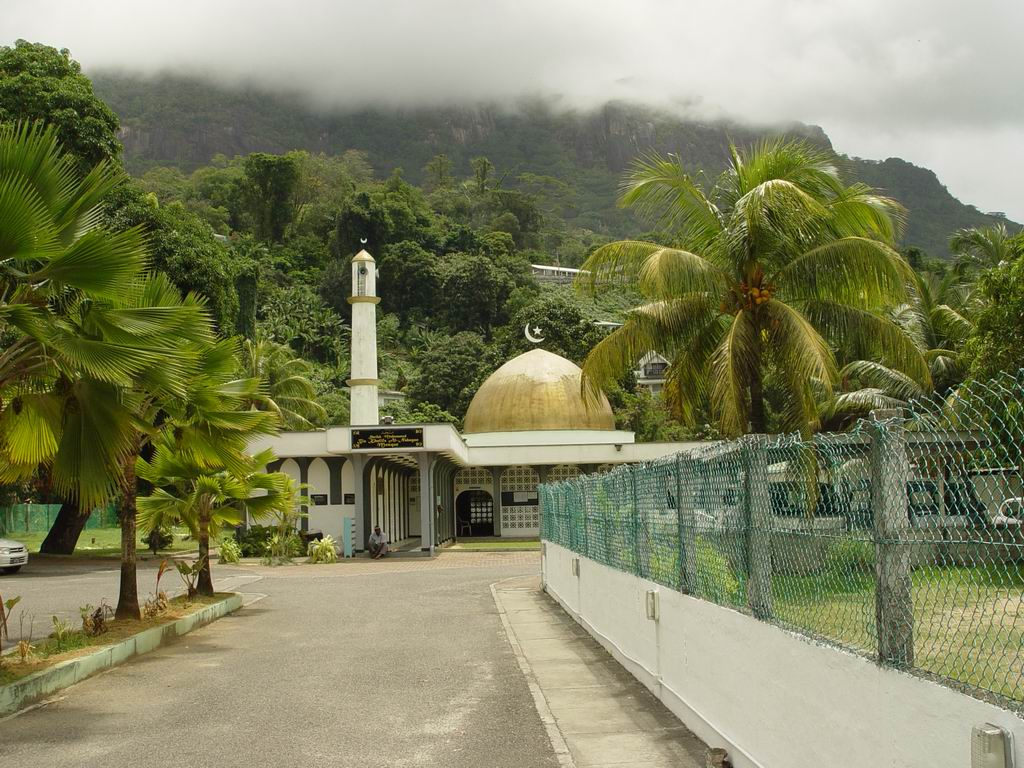
A mosque in Mahe

Islam in the Seychelles was established by Muslim sea merchants well before the European discovery of Seychelles. However, unlike in other island countries such as the Comoros or the Maldives, there were no permanent inhabitants in Seychelles until the French settlement in 1770. Today, the Muslim population of the islands is reported to be approximately 1.1%, roughly 900 people. Many of its island neighbours in the southern Indian Ocean, including the Comoros, Maldives, and Zanzibar, have a much larger Muslim influence because of their settlement by Muslims before European colonization. Mauritius also has a much higher Muslim population due to the importation of labour from British India on a scale not seen in Seychelles. The government of Seychelles allows 15 minutes of religious broadcasting every Friday for the Muslim community.

== Background ==
While many Islamic mosques have been built around the country, approximately 2.5 percent of Seychelles is Muslim. One of the prominent islands with many of the Muslims and mosques is the island of Mahe.

== Demographics ==
Historical population
| Year | Pop. | ±% |
|---|---|---|
| 1994 | 506 | — |
| 2002 | 866 | +71.1% |
| 2010 | 1,459 | +68.5% |
| 2022 | 3,000 | +105.6% |

| Year | Percent | Increase |
|---|---|---|
| 1994 | 0.8% | - |
| 2002 | 1.1% | 0.3% |
| 2011 | 1.6% | 0.5% |
| 2022 | 2.4% | 0.8% |

According to the 2010 Census, there were 1,459 Muslims in the Seychelles constituting 1.6 % of the population of Seychelles. This is an increase of 593 from the 2002 census, which reported 866 Muslims constituting 1.1 % of the population. In 1994, there were 506 Muslims constituting 0.7 % of the country's population.

== Islamic Society of Seychelles and fasting ==
An Islamic Society of Seychelles (current president: Ibrahim Afif) attempted to start their own program named Explore Islam. However, the program was closed down unexpectedly.

On 5 June 2019, the Islamic community held an Eid-ul-Fitr celebration at Stad Popiler (which is located in the capital, Victoria).

== Mosques ==
- Sheikh Mohamed bin Khalifa Mosque
