= Jean Margéot =

Mauritian cardinal (1916–2009)

His Eminence Jean Margéot
- Bishop Emeritus of Port-Louis
- Church: Roman Catholic Church
- Diocese: Port-Louis
- See: Port-Louis
- Appointed: 6 February 1969
- Term ended: 15 February 1993
- Predecessor: Daniel Liston
- Successor: Maurice Piat
- Other post: Cardinal-Priest of San Gabriele Arcangelo all'Acqua Traversa (1988-2009)
- Previous post: President of the Episcopal Conference of the Indian Ocean (1986-89)

Orders
- Ordination: 17 December 1938 by Francesco Marchetti Selvaggiani
- Consecration: 4 May 1969 by Paolo Mosconi
- Created cardinal: 25 June 1988 by Pope John Paul II
- Rank: Cardinal-Priest

Personal details
- Born: Jean Margéot; 3 February 1916 Quatre-Bornes, Mauritius
- Died: 17 July 2009 (aged 93) Filles de Marie Convent, Bonne-Terre, Vacoas, Mauritius
- Buried: Port-Louis Cathedral
- Parents: Joseph Margéot; Marie Harel
- Education: Pontifical Gregorian University
- Motto: Non ministrari sed ministrare

Jean Margéot (3 February 1916 – 17 July 2009) was a Mauritian Roman Catholic priest, bishop and cardinal.

== Education ==
A native of Quatre-Bornes, Mauritius, Jean Margéot attended Collège Père Laval before attending the Royal College Curepipe. He travelled to Rome for further religious studies. Margéot was ordained a priest on 17 December 1938 at Basilica Saint-Jean-de-Latran in Rome.

== Priesthood in Mauritius ==
He was consecrated as Bishop of the Diocese of Port-Louis on 4 May 1969 and served until 15 February, 1993. He was President of the Conférence Episcopale de l'Océan Indien from 1986–1989.

== Elevation to rank of Cardinal ==
Margéot was named a cardinal by Pope John Paul II on 28 June 1988 becoming Cardinal-Priest of San Gabriele Arcangelo all'Acqua Traversa, the first cardinal from Mauritius. Following his death in 2009 at the age of 93, Margéot was lauded by Pope Benedict XVI in a public statement.

== Contribution to society ==
Following the 1968 Mauritian riots Jean Margéot worked to reconcile the racial and religious tensions which existed at the time of the island's Independence. In the 1960s he was the founder of Action Familiale which assisted in managing rising population growth-rate. In more recent times Cardinal Jean Margéot's main contributions have been the holistic training of clergy and his followers. He is also credited for appeasing public anger during the 1999 Mauritian riots following the murder in custody of Kaya (Mauritian musician). Pope Benedict paid tribute to Margéot especially for having promoted the importance of the family in a stable society.

== Publications ==
Jean Margéot published several books including "Civilisation Mauricienne Et Valeurs Morales : Lettre Pastorale de Careme 1993" and "Le voyage intérieur : Dialogues sur la prière et la méditation" in 2007.

== Legacy ==
A period of national mourning was announced throughout Mauritius and sporting events were suspended when Cardinal Jean Margéot died. In recognition of the contribution of Cardinal Jean Margéot a new training institute was named Institut Cardinal Jean Margéot in 2009. It specialises in Catholic education and is located at Maison de Carné along Célicourt Antelme street in Rose Hill. The main bus terminal of Beau Bassin-Rose Hill was also named Place Cardinal Jean Margéot in honour of the high priest.
