= Apostolic Vicariate of Rodrigues =

Roman Catholic missionary jurisdiction in Mauritius

Coordinates: 19.718°S 63.4384°E

Apostolic Vicariate of Rodrigues Vicariatus Apostolicus Rodrigensis
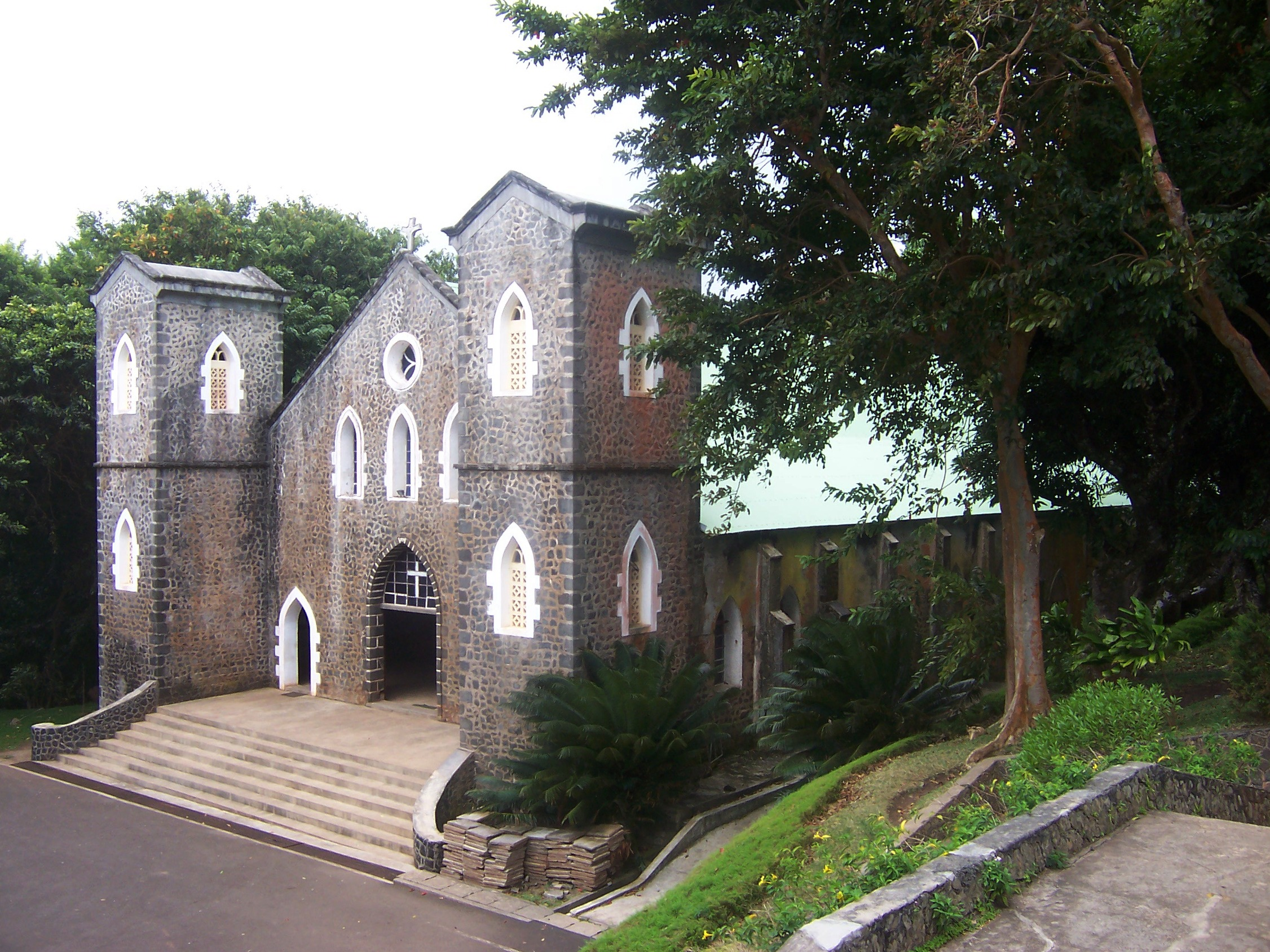
- St. Gabriel Cathedral, Rodrigues

Location
- Country: Mauritius
- Metropolitan: Immediately subject to the Holy See

Statistics
- Area: 104 km^{2} (40 sq mi)
- Population: Total; Catholics: (as of 2014); 40,434; 36,752 (90.9%)

Information
- Denomination: Roman Catholic
- Rite: Latin Rite
- Cathedral: St. Gabriel Cathedral, Rodrigues
- Secular priests: 5

Current leadership
- Pope: Leo XIV
- Bishop: Michel Moura

The Apostolic Vicariate of Rodrigues (Latin: Vicariatus Apostolicus Rodrigensis) is a Roman Catholic apostolic vicariate located on the island of Rodrigues in Mauritius.

== History ==
- October 31, 2002: Established as Apostolic Vicariate of Rodrigues from the Diocese of Port-Louis

== Leadership ==
- Vicar Apostolics of Rodrigues (Roman rite)
  - Bishop Alain Harel (October 31, 2002 – September 10, 2020), later appointed as Bishop of Port Victoria.
  - Bishop Michel Moura since 2023
