= Diocese of Port Victoria =

Catholic diocese in Seychelles

Diocese of Port Victoria (or Seychelles) Dioecesis Portus Victoriae (o Seychellarum) Diocèse de Port-Victoria (ou Seychelles)
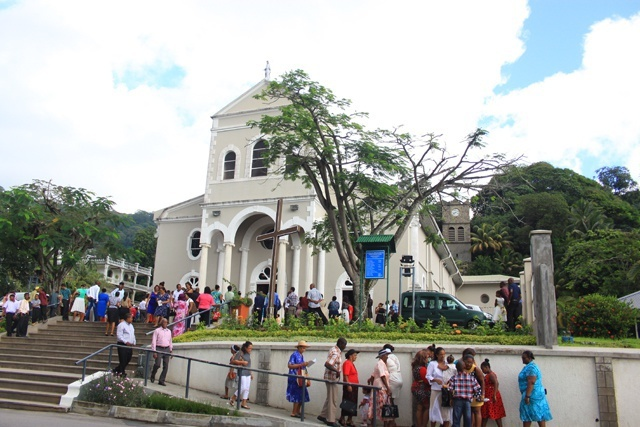
- Immaculate Conception Cathedral

Location
- Country: Seychelles
- Ecclesiastical province: Immediately exempt to the Holy See

Statistics
- Area: 455 km^{2} (176 sq mi)
- Population: Total; Catholics: (as of 2022); 102,612; 62,952 (61.3%)
- Parishes: 17

Information
- Denomination: Catholic Church
- Sui iuris church: Latin Church
- Rite: Roman Rite
- Established: 14 July 1892
- Cathedral: Immaculate Conception Cathedral

Current leadership
- Pope: Leo XIV
- Bishop: Landry Philippe Rasamison, O.F.M. Cap
- Bishops emeritus: Alain Harel; Denis Wiehe, C.S.Sp.

Website
- dioceseportvictoria.org

The Roman Catholic Diocese of Port Victoria (or Seychelles) (French: Diocèse de Port-Victoria) is the only Latin Catholic diocese in the Seychelles. It is exempt, i.e. directly dependent on the Holy See, and remains missionary, governed by the Roman Congregation for the Evangelization of Peoples. Its cathedral episcopal see is the Cathédrale de l’Immaculée Conception (dedicated to the Immaculate Conception) in Victoria, the capital city of the country.

== History ==
- Established in 1852 as Apostolic Prefecture of Seychelles, on insular territory split off from the Roman Catholic Diocese of Port-Louis (Indian Ocean neighbour Mauritius).
- Promoted on 31 August 1880 as Apostolic Vicariate of Seychelles, hence entitled to a titular bishop.
- Promoted and renamed after its see on 14 July 1892 as Diocese of Port Victoria (also still known as Seychelles).
- It enjoyed a papal visit from Pope John Paul II in December 1986.

== Ordinaries ==
=== Apostolic Prefects of Seychelles ===
- Jérémie de Paglietta (1853–1855)
- Léon des Avanchers (1855–1863)
- Symphorien Jean-Pierre-Ignace Galfione, OFM Cap (1863 – 30 August 1880 see below)

=== Apostolic Vicars of Seychelles ===
- Symphorien Jean-Pierre-Ignace Galfione, OFM Cap (see above 30 August 1880 – 19 December 1881)
- Charles-Jacques Mouard, OFM Cap (8 August 1882 – 8 August 1888), appointed Bishop of Lahore, Pakistan
- Not possessed: Edmond Alfred Dardel, OFM Cap (23 August 1889 – 21 March 1890)
- Marc Hudrisier, OFM Cap (2 September 1890 – 14 July 1892 see below)

=== Bishops of Port Victoria ===
- Marc Hudrisier, OFM Cap (see above 14 July 1892 – 6 January 1910)
- Bernard Thomas Edward Clark, OFM Cap (18 June 1910 – 26 September 1915)
- Georges-Jean-Damascène Lachavanne, OFM Cap (13 April 1916 – 24 July 1920)
- Louis-Justin Gumy, OFM Cap (10 March 1921 – 9 January 1934)
- Aloys Ernest Joye, OFM Cap (9 January 1934 – 4 June 1936)
  - Apostolic Administrator: Aloys Ernest Joye, OFM Cap (4 June 1936 – 17 June 1937)
- Marcel Olivier Maradan, OFM Cap (17 June 1937 – 6 October 1972)
  - Apostolic Administrator: Gervais Aeby, OFM Cap (1972-1975)
- Félix Paul (17 March 1975 – 30 May 1994)
  - Apostolic Administrator: Gilbert Aubry (1994 – 3 March 1995)
- Xavier-Marie Baronnet, SJ (3 March 1995 – 1 June 2002)
- Denis Wiehe, CSSp (1 June 2002 – 10 September 2020)
- Alain Harel (10 September 2020 – 21 February 2026), retired
- Landry Philippe Rasamison, OFM Cap (21 February 2026 – Present)

== See also ==
- Catholic Church in Seychelles
- List of Catholic dioceses in Indian Ocean Episcopal Conference
- St. Francis of Assisi Church, Baie Lazare
- Notre Dame de L'Assomption Church, La Digue
