= Diocese of Port-Louis =

Catholic diocese in Mauritius

Diocese of Port Louis Dioecesis Portus Ludovici Diocèse de Port-Louis

catholic
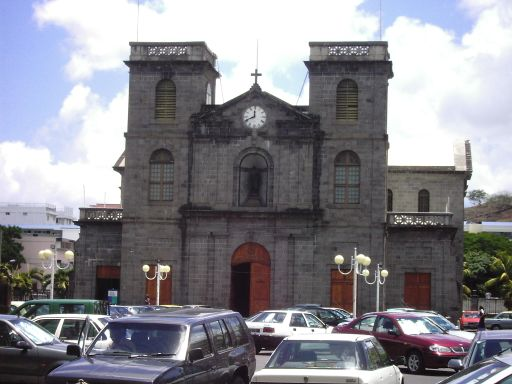
- St. Louis Cathedral, Port-Louis

Location
- Country: Mauritius
- Territory: Republic of Mauritius
- Ecclesiastical province: Immediately exempt to the Holy See
- Coordinates: 20°09′51″S 57°30′25″E

Statistics
- Area: 1,862 km^{2} (719 sq mi)
- Population: Total; Catholics: (as of 2013); 1,253,000; 312,917 (25%)
- Parishes: 39

Information
- Denomination: Catholic
- Sui iuris church: Latin Church
- Rite: Roman Rite
- Established: 7 December 1847
- Cathedral: Cathédrale de Saint-Louis
- Secular priests: 57

Current leadership
- Pope: Leo XIV
- Bishop elect: Jean Michaël Durhône
- Metropolitan Archbishop: Immediately subject to the Holy See
- Bishops emeritus: Maurice Piat

Website
- www.dioceseportlouis.org

The Diocese of Port-Louis (Latin: Portus Ludovici; French: Diocèse de Port-Louis) is a Latin Church ecclesiastical territory or diocese of the Catholic Church located in the city of Port Louis, the capital city of Mauritius.

== History ==
On June 6, 1837, the territory was established as the Apostolic Vicariate of Mauritius from the Apostolic Vicariate of Cape of Good Hope and adjacent territories. On December 7, 1847, the vicariate was promoted to a diocese.

== Leadership ==
Vicars Apostolic of Mauritius

- Bishop William Placid Morris, O.S.B. (June 6, 1837 – 1840)
- Bishop Bernard Collier, O.S.B. (February 14, 1840 – December 7, 1847 see below)

Bishops of Port-Louis

- Bishop Bernard Collier, O.S.B. (see above December 7, 1847 – September 15, 1863)
- Bishop Michael Adrian Hankinson, O.S.B. (September 28, 1863 – September 21, 1870)
- Bishop William Benedict Scarisbrick, O.S.B. (December 22, 1871 – September 27, 1887), appointed titular archbishop in 1888
- Archbishop (titular) Johann Gabriel Léon Louis Meurin, S.J. (September 27, 1887 – June 1, 1895)
- Bishop Peter Augustine O'Neill, O.S.B. (May 22, 1896 – November 26, 1909)
- Bishop James Romanus Bilsborrow, O.S.B. (September 13, 1910 – February 7, 1916), appointed Archbishop of Cardiff, Wales
- Bishop John Tuohill Murphy, C.S.Sp. (July 8, 1916 – April 16, 1926)
- Bishop James Leen, C.S.Sp. (April 16, 1926 – August 1, 1933 see below)
- Archbishop (personal title) James Leen, C.S.Sp. (see above August 1, 1933 – December 19, 1949)
- Bishop Daniel Liston, C.S.Sp. (December 19, 1949 – April 23, 1968)
- Bishop Jean Margéot (February 6, 1969 – February 15, 1993) (Cardinal in 1988)
- Bishop Maurice Piat, C.S.Sp. (February 15, 1993 – May 19, 2023) (Cardinal in 2016)
- Bishop Jean Michaël Durhône (May 19, 2023 - present)

Coadjutor Bishops

- James Leen, C.S.Sp. (1925-1926)
- Daniel Liston, C.S.Sp. (1947-1949)
- Maurice Evenor Piat, C.S.Sp. (1991-1993); future Cardinal

Auxiliary Bishop

- Peter (Pierce) Michael Comerford (1862), did not take effect

Other priests of this diocese who became bishops

- Alain Harel, appointed Vicar Apostolic of Rodrigues in 2002, later became bishop of Port Victoria in 2020.

== Schools ==
Secondary schools:

- Loreto College Bambous Virieux
- Loreto College Curepipe
- Loreto College Mahebourg
- Loreto College Port Louis
- Loreto College Rose Hill
- Loreto College St. Pierre
- College du Bon et Perpétuel Secours
- College de la Confiance
- College Père Laval
- College Sainte-Marie
- Notre Dame College
- Collège du Saint-Joseph
- Collège du Saint-Esprit
- Collège du Saint-Esprit Riviere Noire
- Saint Mary's College
- St. Mary's West College
