= Royal Commission into the Home Insulation Program =

2013–14 Australian inquiry

Identification and management of the workplace health and safety and other risks relating to the Home Insulation Program
- Deaths: Four males (aged 16 to 25 years)
- Injuries: Significant Third degree burns; and several "near misses" as a result of using staple guns while mains electricity remained on
- Property damage: Ninety-four house fires related to insulation; and allegations of fraud.
- Inquiries: Royal Commission into the Home Insulation Program
- Commissioner: Ian Hanger, AM QC
- Inquiry period: 12 December 2013 – 1 September 2014
- Constituting instrument: Royal Commissions Act 1902 (Cth)
- Website: Archived at Trove

The Royal Commission into the Home Insulation Program was a Royal Commission established by the Australian government pursuant to the Royal Commissions Act 1902 (Cth) to inquire into the matters that may have arisen from the development and implementation of the Australian government's Home Insulation Program. The establishment of the commission followed the death of four workers (aged from 16 to 25 years) who died in separate incidents that may have been attributed to the failure to identify and manage the workplace health and safety and other risks associated with the implementation and management of the Program. The Royal Commission inquired into and reported on the deaths, serious injuries and impacts on longstanding home insulation businesses alleged to have arisen from the Program.

The Royal Commission commenced on 12 December 2013 and was overseen by a sole Royal Commissioner, Ian Hanger, AM QC, a barrister. The Commissioner was asked to submit his report to the Governor-General by 30 June 2014. The report was tabled to parliament on 1 September 2014.

== Background ==
A measure, known as the "Energy Efficient Homes Package", was announced by Prime Minister Kevin Rudd on 3 February 2009. A component of that Package was the "Homeowner Insulation Program", which was replaced on 1 July 2009 by the "Home Insulation Program" (both of which form the Program). The Home Insulation Program was administered by the Department of the Environment, Water, Heritage and the Arts. The Package and Program were established in the context of the First Rudd Government's use of expansionary fiscal policies at their discretion to counter the effects of the 2008 financial crisis. The Energy Efficient Homes Package was a part of the A$42 billion Nation Building – Economic Stimulus Plan.

Pursuant to the Administrative Arrangement Orders of 3 December 2007, Peter Garrett was appointed as the Minister for the Environment, Water, Heritage and the Arts, and Penny Wong became the Minister for Climate Change and Water. In a reshuffle of the ministry in March 2010, the responsibility for the Package was transferred from Garrett to Wong. David Borthwick was appointed as departmental secretary on 3 December 2007, serving until 2009; with Robyn Kruk serving during 2009 and 2010.

=== Deaths and inquest recommendations ===
As the program was delivered into communities, four males (aged 16 to 25 years) who worked as home insulation installers, died in four separate incidents between October 2009 and February 2010. Two workers died as a result of electrocution installing foil lined insulation; one worker was electrocuted installing fibreglass "pink batts" (all three in Queensland); and one worker died from hyperthermia, also installing "pink batts" (in New South Wales). On 9 February 2010, four days after the fourth death, the Commonwealth Government suspended the use of foil insulation; and the entire Home Insulation Program was discontinued on 19 February 2010.

Coronial inquests were held in both New South Wales (NSW) and Queensland (Qld) into the death(s) in each jurisdiction. Magistrate Hugh Dillon, the Deputy State Coroner of NSW, made nine recommendations that related to:

1. "...improving publicity campaigns emphasising the risks of heat stress..., and the importance of regular consumption of water ... as a primary means of preventing heat stress or heat stroke;"
2. "...the Australian Construction Training Service ("ACTS") conducting random audits of registered ... training organisations ... to assess the appropriateness and effectiveness of the training;"
3. "...the ACTS requiring registered ... training organisations to certify that courses they conduct have included a practical component and assessment ... with an appropriate standard set by the ACTS;"
4. "...the ACTS consider requiring that ... registered ... training organisations certify [the trainees] have either passed or not passed the practical component and assessment;"
5. "...the ACTS amend its insulation industry training materials to include a specific reference to the topic of heat exhaustion and heat stroke and the need for regular hydration with water;"
6. "...the ACTS consider having its insulation industry materials reviewed by a specialist adult educationist to ensure that they meet "best practice" educational standards ....;"
7. "...ComSec Global Training ("ComSec") modifying its insulation industry training materials to include a specific reference to the topic of heat exhaustion ... and the need for regular hydration with water;"
8. "...Standards Australia amending the [relevant standard] to include a reference to managing hot conditions; and
9. "...the Minister for Finance [ensure] that guidelines for Australian Government programs include a standard reference to the requirement for compliance with State and Federal occupational health and safety legislation..."

The State Coroner of Queensland, Michael Barnes, made five recommendations, namely that:

1. "...the Office of Fair and Safe Work Queensland undertakes a review of state-based workplace safety agencies [that] failed to proactively respond to [the] increased risk of harm...;"
2. "...the Office of Fair and Safe Work Queensland undertake a public awareness campaign giving guidance as to how home occupiers and relevant tradespeople can minimise their exposure to the risk of electrical shock inherent in entering a residential roof space...;"
3. "...the State Government [of Queensland] assess the competing policy considerations with expert advice from the Electrical Safety Office about the various options for the extension of the requirement for the mandatory fitting residual current devices in ... residential premises;"
4. "...the Director of Public Prosecution consider whether charges of perjury should be laid against a witness at the inquest;" and
5. "...the [Queensland] Department of Justice and the Attorney-General ... consider ... whether ... prosecution[s] should occur alleging breaches of the ... Workplace Health and Safety Act... [and] the Electrical Safety Act;"

=== Operational matters and inquiries ===
Allegations of fraud under the program were made, with three cases forwarded to the Australian Federal Police for investigation. In March 2010 the Federal Government announced a proposal to remove foil insulation or make it safe from 50,000 houses and undertake another 150,000 inspections. In March 2011, 35 search warrants were executed targeting alleged fraud by businesses and individuals in New South Wales, Queensland and Victoria. Climate Change and Energy Efficiency Minister, Greg Combet, stated that the Government would pursue those alleged unscrupulous operators who had fraudulently abused this program.

The Auditor-General, Ian McPhee, identified shortcomings in the way the Department of the Environment, Water, Heritage and the Arts handled the program's implementation as it faced pressure from to establish the program during the height of the 2008 financial crisis. The report stated that the department requested the program be rolled out over five years but that this request was denied because of the desire to stimulate the economy and create jobs. McPhee also reported the department underestimated the level of risk involved in an unregulated industry which used inexperienced workers to install insulation in ceiling spaces. At its peak, demand for the program more than doubled original expectations. In his report, McPhee stated that as problems mounted, the then minister, Garrett, did not have his requests for information answered promptly and then, when it was provided, it was "overly optimistic" and contained factual errors. The Auditor-General did not make any recommendations because the program was closed by the time he reported.

== Appointment of Commissioner ==
On 12 December 2013, the Governor-General Quentin Bryce, AC CVO issued Commonwealth Letters Patent pursuant to "the Constitution of the Commonwealth of Australia", the Royal Commissions Act 1902 (Cth) and other enabling powers" appointing Ian Hanger, AM QC as the sole Commissioner and the commission's terms of reference. The commissioner was directed "...to inquire into the matters that may have arisen from the development and implementation of the [Home Insulation] Program, and related matters..."

== Terms of Reference ==
The Commissioner was appointed to investigate "...into the matters that may have arisen from the development and implementation of the [Home Insulation] Program, and related matters..." Those matters were defined in the Letters Patent as follows:

a. the processes by which the Australian Government made decisions about the establishment and implementation of the Program, and the bases of those decisions, including how workplace health and safety and other risks relating to the Program were identified, assessed and managed;
b. whether the Australian Government was given, or sought, any advice, warnings or recommendations by or from industry representatives, regulatory authorities or other agencies of the Commonwealth, a State or a Territory during the establishment and implementation of the Program, and what action the Australian Government took in response to any such advice, warnings or recommendations;
c. whether, in establishing or implementing the Program, the Australian Government:

i. failed to have sufficient regard to workplace health and safety or other risks relating to the Program; or
ii. failed to have sufficient regard to advice, warnings or recommendations mentioned in paragraph (b); or
iii. failed to deal adequately with the risks, advice, warnings or recommendations;

and, if so, why sufficient regard was not had to the risks, advice, warnings or recommendations, or why they were not dealt with adequately;

d. whether the death of:

i. Matthew Fuller; or
ii. Rueben Barnes; or
iii. Mitchell Sweeney; or
iv. Marcus Wilson;

could have been avoided by the appropriate identification, assessment or management, by the Australian Government, of workplace health and safety and other risks relating to the Program;

e. whether the Australian Government should have taken action, in relation to the identification, assessment or management of workplace health and safety and other risks relating to the Program, that you consider would or may have avoided the deaths of the persons named in paragraph (d);
f. the effects of the Program on:

i. the families of the persons named in paragraph (d); and
ii. pre-existing home insulation businesses;

g. whether the Australian Government should change its laws, policies, practices, processes, procedures or systems for the purpose of seeking to prevent the recurrence of any failure identified by your inquiry.

AND, without limiting the scope of your inquiry or the scope of any recommendations arising out of your inquiry that you may consider appropriate, We direct you to consider:

h. all relevant matters occurring during the period:

i. starting at the commencement of the policy development that led to the introduction of the Program; and
ii. ending at the termination of the Program; and

i. all remedial measures undertaken by the Australian Government after the Program was terminated.

AND, without limiting the scope of your inquiry or the scope of any recommendations arising out of your inquiry that you may consider appropriate, We declare that you may:

j. consider:

i. damage to property claimed to have arisen from the implementation of the Program; and
ii. the effects on pre-existing home insulation businesses resulting from the damage; and

k. make findings or recommendations about those matters;

but you are not required by these Our Letters Patent to do so.

AND We further declare that you are not required by these Our Letters Patent to inquire, or to continue to inquire, into a particular matter to the extent that you are satisfied that the matter has been, is being, or will be, sufficiently and appropriately dealt with by any of the following:

l. the inquests in Queensland and New South Wales into the deaths of the persons named in paragraph (d);
m. the findings of any court or tribunal inquiring into serious injuries, or loss or damage, claimed to have arisen from the Program;
n. inquiries by State or Territory governments, police forces or other agencies into the deaths of the persons named in paragraph (d) or into serious injuries, or loss or damage, claimed to have arisen from the Program;
o. the findings of the Report by the Australian National Audit Office into the Program;
p. the findings of the Review of the Administration of the Program;
q. any other relevant inquiry, proceeding or finding.

== Powers ==
The powers of Royal Commissions in Australia are set out in the enabling legislation, the Royal Commissions Act 1902 (Cth).

Royal Commissions, appointed pursuant to the Royal Commissions Act or otherwise, have powers to issue a summons to a person to appear before the Commission at a hearing to give evidence or to produce documents specified in the summons; require witnesses to take an oath or give an affirmation; and require a person to deliver documents to the Commission at a specified place and time. A person served with a summons or a notice to produce documents must comply with that requirement, or face prosecution for an offence. The penalty for conviction upon such an offence is a fine of A$1,000 or six months imprisonment. A Royal Commission may authorise the Australian Federal Police to execute search warrants.

== Procedures and methods ==
The Royal Commission served over 125 summonses to produce documents and received over 70,000 relevant documents in response; and its first few months involved the collection and examination of information about the former Home Insulation Program. The commission also held discussions with 120 potential witnesses to clarify the assistance they may be willing to provide to the Royal Commission. Sitting over 37 days of public hearings, in excess of 50 witnesses testified in the period from December 2013 until May 2014. The purpose of the public hearings was to hear evidence about:

- the process by which the Australian Government made decisions about the establishment and implementation of the Program
- the process by which the Australian Government identified, assessed and managed workplace health and safety and other risks relating to the Program
- whether the Australian Government had sufficient regard for risks and whether the Australian Government dealt with warnings or information about risks adequately
- whether the deaths of Fuller, Barnes, Sweeney and Wilson could have been avoided if the Australian Government had taken a different approach to identifying, assessing or managing workplace health and safety risks
- the effects of the Program on the families of Fuller, Barnes, Sweeney and Wilson, and
- the effects of the Program on pre-existing home insulation businesses.

Leave to appear before the commission was granted to Kevin Rudd, Mark Arbib, Mike Mrdak, Peter Garrett, the State of Queensland, the Australian Government, and representatives of the Fuller, Barnes, Sweeney and Wilson families. Former Prime Minister Julia Gillard was also summonsed to appear and ministers were served notice that they should surrender any documents in their possession relating to the Home Insulation Program.

=== Hearings ===
During March and May 2014, a science and engineering expert who was employed as a technical adviser for the Home Insulation Program on performance and safety issues testified before the Royal Commission that he was verbally threatened when he raised safety concerns about the program. He gave verbal and written evidence before the Royal Commission that two senior Environment Department officials told him safety was not a concern and that the Program had been poorly costed. After raising his concerns with a senior public servant, twenty minutes later his contract was terminated.

"(The program's policy team director) was prepared to accept that there could be injuries, serious injuries. The program policy was that was acceptable because the responsibility was to be pushed out to the installers."

"This is a worrying situation as it appears that the predominant attitude in the insulation industry is to work with no regards whatever for height or materials handling safety. ...the last thing the department wants is to be seen as promoting a program that is encouraging unsafe materials handling and work practices."

"(I was told) the costings were drawn up on the back of a napkin by some senior Labor Party politician ... and the head of the bulk (insulation) industry association. It was one of the prime minister’s inner-circle, whether it was him himself, I’m not sure."

"(I was told) basically shut up or you’re no longer on the program."

— Dr Delbridge, an Environment Department official, testifying before the Royal Commission.

Appearing before the Royal Commission on 13 and 14 May 2014, Mark Abib testified that it was up to public servants to tell him and other politicians of the potentially lethal problems in the program.

Peter Garrett appeared before the Royal Commission on 13 and 14 May. He testified that he bore "ultimate responsibility" for the home insulation program.

"I was responsible for the rollout of the HIP and bore ultimate responsibility for its implementation. My view about responsibility is that we share responsibilities in the delivery of government programs. We share responsibilities with those other institutions that equally have them, such as state regulatory bodies, employers, ultimately employees as well. I’m certainly mindful that as a government minister delivering a program there’s a responsibility to the best of your capacity to ensure it’s delivered in a way that minimises risk. You’re never going to get rid of risk altogether in any course of life..... (The government tried to minimise risk through the)... measures that were put in place over time. Notwithstanding that we had guidelines and requirements and information that was going to installers, we still had sufficient numbers of installers who weren't observing the guidelines. Whether you found out about them through compliance or regrettably from some other reason, I made my ultimate decision." "Injury to installers isn't, from my recollection and from the briefs that we have here in preparing this statement, raised directly with me by way of decision-making or otherwise. And I think up until Matthew Fuller's death, it wasn't something which had been specifically or formally brought to my attention. I clearly wasn't satisfied with (the advice from my department). How could I be? Some of the advice was deficient. (I took both safety and the effective delivery of programs) "very seriously" (and acted on advice from his department). I believe that this was consistent with the proper discharge of my duty as a government minister. I didn't have a view when advice reached me that it wouldn't be possible to deliver the home insulation program."

— Peter Garrett, former Environment Minister, testifying before the Royal Commission.

Kevin Rudd appeared before the Royal Commission on 14 and 15 May; the first time an Australian Prime Minister had been called before a Royal Commission. Much of Rudd's statement to the inquiry was redacted by the Australian Government Solicitor, claiming Cabinet secrecy reasons. Rudd's counsel, Bret Walker SC said his client could not tell his side of the story while being met with a "devastating truncation of the truth". The Royal Commissioner dismissed the redaction and in a subsequent appearance before the Royal Commission, released from long-standing Cabinet secrecy rules, Rudd testified that if Cabinet had been warned of safety risks, the program's rollout in 2009 would have been delayed. He also gave evidence that the stimulus package had a colour-coding system: "green for 'on track'; amber for maintaining 'close watch'; and red for 'in difficulty'." Of the eight reports during 2009–10, all recorded the HIP as "on track" until March 2010. By then, the four young men had died and the program had shut down.

"I've said repeatedly before, I have accepted ultimate responsibility for what was not just bad, but in this case a deep tragedy." "The program was operating until its conclusion ... with more than one million homes, with more than 10,000 employees ... and the position was to take advice from the portfolio minister responsible (Mr Garrett) and the public service advising me."

— Kevin Rudd, former Prime Minister, testifying before the Royal Commission.

On 16 May, Greg Combet appeared before the Royal Commission and testified that the program had problems from the start, claiming "flaws in the design of it" and that the risks were ongoing. He stated, "When I was given the job of remediating all the problems I tried to be as fair as I could to industry and help as much as I could but ultimately the damage was done by the program itself and the operation of a lot of unscrupulous operators."

The same day, representatives of the Fuller and Barnes' families gave written and oral statements. Kevin Fuller, the father of Matthew Fuller, testified before the Royal Commission that his son was employed as an insulation installer by a bankrupt telemarketing company. He testified that Matthew's employer was clearly "dodgy" and did not provide the adequate training but only got a two-year good behaviour bond and a fine for a few thousand dollars; and that he considered "(Kevin) Rudd to be one of the main people responsible for Matthew's death and the deaths of three others." Ruben Barnes' sister, Sunny gave evidence that as the result of her brother's death, the formerly close-knit family had broken down.

== Reports ==
The federal government requested a final report from the Royal Commission not later than 30 June 2014. In May 2014 the Governor-General agreed to an extension of the reporting period, not later than 31 August 2014. The report was tabled in parliament on 1 September 2014.

According to Prime Minister Tony Abbott, the findings of the commission found seven major failings that led to the deaths.
