= MauBank =

Mauritian bank

MauBank Ltd
- Trade name: MauBank
- Company type: State owned
- Industry: Banking, Financial services
- Founded: August 1, 2003; 22 years ago in Port Louis, Mauritius
- Founder: Government of Mauritius
- Headquarters: 25 Bank Street, Ebene CyberCity, Mauritius
- Key people: Mr. Vishuene Vydelingum (Chief Executive Officer)
- Services: Consumer banking Corporate banking Investment banking Mortgage loans Private banking Wealth management Credit cards Insurance
- Number of employees: 850; (2021)
- Parent: MauBank Holding Ltd
- Website: www.maubank.mu

MauBank is a bank headquartered in Ebene CyberCity, Mauritius. It is licensed as a commercial bank by the Bank of Mauritius, the country's central bank and the nation's banking regulator. MauBank is the third largest bank in Mauritius. It offers a full range of financial services to private and corporate clients, wealthy individuals, companies, public and financial institutions. The activities are divided into different business lines: Retail & Private Banking, Corporate Banking, International Banking, Wealth Management, Insurance services, SME Banking and Leasing. MauBank maintain a network of 19 branches, including one in Rodrigues island, the bank also provides basic banking services across the 102 Post offices operated by Mauritius Post Ltd. MauBank is wholly owned by the Government of Mauritius, as at 2019 the government announced its intention of finding a strategic partner to expand the activities of the bank. MauBank's strategic decisions are taken by its board of directors, headed by the chairman. Premchand Mungar is the chief executive officer.

== History and ownership ==
The government of Mauritius established the Mauritius Post and Cooperative Bank (MPCB) Ltd in August 2003, following the merger of the New Co-operative Bank Ltd with the Post Office Savings Bank. On 4 January 2016, the MPCB acquired the assets and liabilities of the National Commercial Bank (Ex-Bramer Banking Corporation). Subsequently, the MPCB changed its name to MauBank Ltd ("MauBank"). At 30 June 2016, the share capital of the Bank stood at Rs 3,270,858,232 represented by 3,401,813,502 ordinary shares. There are twelve (12) shareholders on the shares register with MauBank Holdings Ltd having 99.93% interest in the Bank, the remaining shares being held by 11 shareholders including public sector bodies and cooperative societies. MauBank Holdings Ltd is in turn 100% owned by the Government of Mauritius.

== eBanking services ==
In line with its green and digitization agenda, the bank adopted paperless account opening, e-statements, online financial calculators, robotic process automation in areas like credit scoring and loan processing. Customers receives instant SMS text messages when funds are debited or credited on their bank accounts. The cards services provided by the bank supports contactless payments using near-field communications. In addition to the internet banking facilities which allows users to transfer funds and manage their bank accounts, the bank was the first in Mauritius to offer online lending facilities known as MyLease.

== MauBank WithMe ==
MauBank WithMe is a freeware mobile banking app from MauBank. The app is available on electronic devices such as smartphones, tablet computers, and personal computers. The app enables individuals to electronically transfer money from their bank account to another registered user's bank account using a mobile device, withdraw money from ATM's without card, manage their bank accounts and perform online transactions. In 2018, MauBank became the first bank in Mauritius to on-board customers through a mobile app. The app use OCR technology to store and organize users' information from various documents such as IDs and proof of address. The app also allows video call with the officers of the bank during office hours. MauBank WithMe is available on the iOS App Store and Google Play Store.

The bank won the Application Programming Interface (API) Led Innovations award and was the finalist for Emerging Technology Led Innovations at the Infosys Finacle Client Innovation Awards in 2019.

=== Features ===
The updated version of the app was launched on 27 September 2018, the main features of the app are as follows:

==== View account details and transactions ====
- Check account balance
- Check transaction history
- View mini-statement
- View status of transactions
- Download account statement

==== Pay and Transfer Funds ====
- Transfer funds between bank accounts
- Transfer funds to another MauBank account
- Transfer funds from MauBank to another local bank
- Manage beneficiaries to facilitate funds transfer
- Pay cardless to a mobile number and withdraw money at any MauBank ATM
- Recharge phone and that of your friends and relatives anytime
- Setup schedule or recurring funds transfer
- Stop schedule/recurring and cardless funds transfer

==== Credit Card ====
- View Credit card details, available credit and card limit
- Access and download credit card statements
- Reload Credit card from Foreign Currency Account or MUR Account
- Block/ unblock credit card anytime

==== Open a new Bank account ====
- Open a Bank account

==== Authenticate using fingerprint or Face ID ====
- Use fingerprint or Face ID for authentication

==== Manage services ====
- Block or unblock debit or credit card
- Change mPIN
- Refer WithMe to a friend
- De-register mobile device not in use

== Branches ==
The bank maintains its headquarters at the Ebene CyberCity, Mauritius. The bank provides basic banking services across the 102 post offices network of the Mauritius Post Ltd which are open on Saturdays. MauBank also maintain a network of local branches, including one in Rodrigues island as listed below.

Branch	Address
Chemin Grenier (SME branch)	Royal Road, Chemin Grenier
Curepipe (SME branch)	Royal Road, Curepipe
Ebene	Ground Floor, Bramer House, Ebene CyberCity
Flacq (SME branch)	Flacq Shopping Mall, Boulet Rouge, Flacq
Goodlands	Royal Road, Goodlands
Grand Bay	Richmond Hill Complex, Grand Bay
Lallmatie	Corner Tagore and Royal Road, Lallmatie
Mahebourg (SME branch)	Corner Delices and Mariannes Streets, Mahébourg
Pope Hennessy Port Louis (SME branch)	Pope Hennessy Street Port Louis
Place D'Armes, Port Louis	1, Queen Street Place D'Armes, Port Louis
Quatre-Bornes (SME branch)	St Jean Road, Quatre Bornes
Riviere Du Rempart (SME branch)	Riverside Shopping Complex, Royal Road Riviere Du Rempart
Rose Belle (SME branch)	Royal Road, Bahamia Rose Belle
Rose Hill	Royal Road, Rose Hill
Saint Pierre (SME branch)	Kendra Commercial Centre, Saint Pierre
Terre Rouge	Royal Road, Le Hochet, Terre Rouge
Triolet (SME branch)	Royal Road, Triolet
Vacoas	Intendence Avenue, Vacoas
Rodrigues (SME branch)	Rue Max Lucchesi, Port Mathurin, Rodrigues

== See also ==
- List of banks in Mauritius
