= Royal commission =

Ad-hoc public inquiries

A royal commission is a major ad-hoc formal public inquiry into a defined issue in some monarchies. They have been held in the United Kingdom, Australia, Canada, New Zealand, Norway, Malaysia, Mauritius and Saudi Arabia. In republics an equivalent entity may be termed a commission of inquiry.

Such an inquiry has considerable powers, typically equivalent or greater than those of a judge but restricted to the terms of reference for which it was created. These powers may include subpoenaing witnesses, notably video evidences, taking evidence under oath and requesting documents.

The commission is created by the head of state (the sovereign, or their representative in the form of a governor-general or governor) on the advice of the government and formally appointed by letters patent. In practice—unlike lesser forms of inquiry—once a commission has started the government cannot stop it. Consequently, governments are usually very careful about framing the terms of reference and generally include in them a date by which the commission must finish.

Royal commissions are called to look into matters of great importance and usually controversy. These can be matters such as government structure, the treatment of minorities, events of considerable public concern or economic questions. Many royal commissions last many years and, often, a different government is left to respond to the findings.

== Notable royal commissions ==
=== Australia ===
Royal commissions have been held in Australia at a federal level since 1902. Royal commissions appointed by the Governor-General operate under the Royal Commissions Act 1902 passed by the Parliament of Australia in 1902. A defunct alternative is known as a Parliamentary Commission of Inquiry.

Royal commissions are the highest form of inquiry on matters of public importance. A royal commission is formally established by the Governor-General on behalf of the Crown and on the advice of government Ministers. The government decides the terms of reference, provides the funding and appoints the commissioners, who are selected on the basis of their independence and qualifications. They are never serving politicians. These inquiries are divided into two types: investigative (uncover the truth), or advisory (develop policies), and they may perform both.

Royal commissions are usually chaired by one or more notable figures. Because of their quasi-judicial powers the commissioners are often retired or serving judges. They usually involve research into an issue, consultations with experts both within and outside government and public consultations as well. The warrant may grant immense investigatory powers, including summoning witnesses under oath, offering of indemnities, seizing of documents and other evidence (sometimes including those normally protected, such as classified information), holding hearings in camera if necessary and—in a few cases—compelling all government officials to aid in the execution of the commission. The results of royal commissions are published in reports, often massive, of findings containing policy recommendations.

Due to the verbose nature of the titles of these formal documents they are commonly known by the name of the commission's chair. For example, the "Royal Commission into whether there has been corrupt or criminal conduct by any Western Australian Police Officer" is known as the Kennedy Royal Commission.

While these reports are often quite influential, with the government enacting some or all recommendations into law, the work of some commissions have been almost completely ignored by the government. In other cases, where the commissioner has departed from the Warranted terms, the commission has been dissolved by a superior court.

==== Federal ====
- Royal Commission in the matter of an inquiry into a statement that there was a document missing from the official files in relation to "The Brisbane Line" (1943)
- Royal Commission on loss of HMAS Voyager (1964) – investigated the collision between HMAS Melbourne and HMAS Voyager
- Royal Commission on the statement of Lieutenant Commander Cabban and matters incidental thereto (1967–1968) – investigated claims that the captain of HMAS Voyager frequently drank to excess and was unfit for command
- Royal Commission on Intelligence and Security ("Hope Commission") – investigated the country's intelligence agencies (1974–1977)
- Royal Commission on Human Relationships (1974–1977) – inquired into and reported on the family, social, educational and sexual aspects of male and female relationships
- Royal Commission on the activities of the Federated Ship Painters and Dockers Union ("Costigan Royal Commission") (1980–1984) – investigated organised crime influences and drug trafficking in a large trade union
- Royal Commission of Inquiry into Drug Trafficking ("Stewart Royal Commission") (1981–1983)
- Royal Commission into British nuclear tests in Australia ("McClelland Royal Commission") (1984–1985)
- Royal Commission into Aboriginal Deaths in Custody (1987–1991) – investigated the allegedly disproportionate number of deaths of Australian Aboriginals while in custody
- Royal Commission into HIH Insurance (2001–2003) – investigated the collapse of HIH Insurance, then Australia's second largest insurance company
- Royal Commission into the Building and Construction Industry ("Cole Royal Commission") (2001–2003) – investigated the conduct of industrial relations within the building industry
- Inquiry into certain Australian companies in relation to the UN Oil-For-Food Programme ("Cole Inquiry") (2005–2006) – investigated the alleged participation of the AWB into the Oil for Food program
- Royal Commission into Institutional Responses to Child Sexual Abuse (2013–2017)
- Royal Commission into the Home Insulation Program (2013–2014) – investigated the death of four male workers, ninety-four house fires related to insulation, and allegations of fraud as a result of the implementation of the Home Insulation Program
- Royal Commission into Trade Union Governance and Corruption (2014–2015)
- Royal Commission into the Protection and Detention of Children in the Northern Territory (2016–2017)
- Royal Commission into Misconduct in the Banking, Superannuation and Financial Services Industry (2017–2019)
- Royal Commission into Aged Care Quality and Safety (2018–2021)
- Royal Commission into Violence, Abuse, Neglect and Exploitation of People with Disability (2019–2023)
- Royal Commission into National Natural Disaster Arrangements (2020)
- Royal Commission into the Robodebt Scheme (2022–2023)
- Royal Commission into Defence and Veteran Suicide (2021–2024)
- Royal Commission on Antisemitism and Social Cohesion (2025–2026)

==== New South Wales ====
- Royal Commission into the New South Wales Police Service ("Wood Royal Commission") (1994–1997) – investigated police corruption in New South Wales
- Royal Commission into Drug Trafficking ("Woodward Royal Commission") (1977–1980) – investigated drug trafficking in New South Wales, especially links between the Mafia and New South Wales Police and the disappearance of Donald Mackay
- Royal Commission into New South Wales Prisons ("Nagle Royal Commission") (1976–1978)
- Royal Commission of Inquiry in respect of certain matters relating to allegations of organised crime in clubs ("Moffitt Royal Commission") (1973–1974) – investigated organised crime in New South Wales
- Chelmsford Royal Commission (1989–1990) – investigated patient deaths due to induced comas at the Chelmsford psychiatric hospital in Sydney during the 1960s and 1970s

==== Queensland ====
- Commission of Inquiry into Possible Illegal Activities and Associated Police Misconduct ("Fitzgerald Inquiry") (1987–1989) – investigated police corruption in Queensland
- Grantham Flood Commission of Inquiry
- Barrett Adolescent Centre Commission of Inquiry

==== South Australia ====
- Commission appointed by the Governor-in-Chief to inquire into the loss of the Admella (1859)
- Royal Commission in regard to Rupert Max Stuart (1959)
- Splatt Royal Commission (1983–1984)
- Hindmarsh Island Royal Commission (1995) – investigated the legal and political controversy that involved the clash of Indigenous Australian religious beliefs and property rights regarding the construction of a bridge to Hindmarsh Island
- Kapunda Road Royal Commission (2005) – investigated the circumstances of the hit-and-run death of Ian Humphrey and those of the trial and conviction of Eugene McGee
- Child Protection Systems Royal Commission (2014–2016) – investigated the effectiveness of the child protection systems then in place
- Nuclear Fuel Cycle Royal Commission (2015) – investigated opportunities and risks for South Australia
- Murray-Darling Basin Royal Commission (2018–2019) – investigated the operations and effectiveness of the Murray-Darling Basin system
- Royal Commission into Early Childhood Education and Care (2022–2023)
- Royal Commission into Domestic, Family and Sexual Violence (2024–2025)
- Royal Commission into Artificial Intelligence (2026–2027)

==== Victoria ====
- Royal Commission into the King Street Bridge failure (1962–1963)
- Royal Commission into the West Gate Bridge collapse (1970–1971)
- Royal Commission into the Longford gas plant accident (1998–1999)
- 2009 Victorian Bushfires Royal Commission ("Black Saturday Royal Commission") (2009–2010)
- Royal Commission into Family Violence (2015–2016)
- Royal Commission into Victoria's Mental Health System (22 February 2019 – 2 March 2021)
- Royal Commission into the Management of Police Informants (2018–present)
- Royal Commission into the Integrity of Major Public and Civil Infrastructure Construction Projects in Victoria (2026–present)

==== Western Australia ====
- Royal Commission into alleged killing and burning of bodies of Aborigines in East Kimberley and into police methods when effecting arrests ("1927 Wood Royal Commission") (1927) – investigated the Forrest River massacre of Indigenous Australians
- Royal Commission into Commercial Activities of Government and Other Matters ("WA Inc Royal Commission") (1990–1992) – investigated the collapse of Bond Corporation, Rothwells, Bell Group, and other large businesses in Western Australia as well as government commercial enterprises
- Royal Commission into the use of Executive Power ("Marks Royal Commission") (1995) to determine the circumstances of the tabling of a petition in a family law case and the alleged misleading of the Parliament of Western Australia by Carmen Lawrence
- Royal commission into whether there has been corrupt or criminal conduct by any Western Australian Police Officer ("WA Police Royal Commission") (2002–2004) – investigated high-level corruption in the Western Australian police force

==== Northern Territory ====
- Royal Commission into the Protection and Detention of Children in the Northern Territory (2016–2017). On 25 July 2016 Prime Minister Turnbull announced a Royal Commission would be established after an investigation by Four Corners uncovered serious mistreatment of inmates within the Northern Territory's juvenile detention system.

=== Bahamas ===
- Royal Commission of Inquiry into Drug Trafficking and Government Corruption (November 1983 – December 1984) (formerly The Commission of Inquiry Appointed to Inquire Into the Illegal Use of the Bahamas for the Transshipment of Dangerous Drugs Destined for the United States of America) – A three-person Commission of Inquiry was appointed after US-television reports alleged the government was taking bribes from drug traffickers to look the other way as drugs flowed through the Bahamas bound for the United States.

=== Bahrain ===
- Royal Independent Investigation Commission (June 2011), to examine the episodes of civil disobedience and alleged human rights offences committed in the aftermath of the February 2011 protests.

=== Ceylon ===
- Colebrooke–Cameron Commission

=== Hong Kong ===
- Commission of Inquiry into the Construction Works at and near the Hung Hom Station Extension under the Shatin to Central Link Project (2019–2020)
- Commission of Inquiry into Excess Lead Found in Drinking Water (2015–2016)
- Commission of Inquiry into the Collision of Vessels near Lamma Island (2012)
- Commission of Inquiry on Allegations relating to the Hong Kong Institute of Education (2007)
- Commission of Inquiry on the New Airport (1998–1999)
- Commission of Inquiry into the Garley Building Fire (1996–1997)
- Commission of Inquiry into the Case of Peter Fitzroy Godber (13 June 1973)
- Commission of Inquiry into the Rainstorm Disasters (22 June 1972)
- Commission of Inquiry into the Fire on the Jumbo Floating Restaurant (6 November 1971)
- Commission of Inquiry into Kowloon Disturbances (3 May 1966)

=== India ===
- Royal Commission on Opium (1895)
- Royal Commission on Labour (1929)
- Royal Commission on Agriculture (1928)

=== Malaysia ===
- Royal Commission on Salaries and Conditions of Service of the Public Service (1965)
- Royal Commission of Inquiry to Investigate the Workings of Local Authorities in West Malaysia (1968)
- Royal Commission on the Teaching Services (1971)
- Royal Commission of Inquiry on the collapse of the upper deck of the Pengkalan Sultan Abdul Halim ferry terminal in Butterworth (1988)
- Royal Commission of Inquiry to investigate a fire at Sekolah Agama Rakyat Taufikah al-Halimah in Padang Lumat, Yan, Kedah (1989)
- Royal Commission of Inquiry into the fire at the Bright Sparklers factory in Sungai Buloh New Village (1991)
- Royal Commission to investigate alleged injuries suffered by Datuk Seri Anwar Ibrahim while in police custody (1999)
- Royal Commission for Police Reform (2004)
- Royal Commission of Inquiry into the Lingam Video Clip (2007–2008)
- Royal Commission of Inquiry into the Teoh Beng Hock case (2010–present)
- Royal Commission of Inquiry on illegal immigrants in Sabah (2012–2014)
- Royal Commission of Inquiry on Wang Kelian mass graves (2015–present)
- Royal Commission of Inquiry into BNM forex losses (2017–present)
- Royal Commission of Inquiry into Tabung Haji (2022)

=== Mauritius ===
- Royal Commission on Slave Trade: Commissioners of Eastern Inquiry, Mauritius (1826–1828)
- Fever Inquiry Commission in Mauritius (1866–1868)
- Commission of Enquiry on living conditions of Indentured Coolies in Mauritius (1872–1874)
- Commission of Enquiry into Unrest on Sugar Estates (Hooper Commission, 1937)
- Commission of Enquiry into Disturbances in the North of Mauritius (Moody Commission, 1943)
- Trustram-Eve Electoral Boundaries Commission (1957–1958)
- Commission of Inquiry Sugar Industry by Balogh & Bennett (1962)
- Banwell Commission on the Electoral System of Mauritius (1966)
- Commission of Inquiry in corruption with Ministry of Social Security and Ministry of Cooperatives (1978–1979)
- Commission of Enquiry on the Sugar Industry (1984)
- Commission of Enquiry on Drugs (1986–1987)
- Margo Commission of Enquiry on crash of South African Airways Flight 295 (1987)
- Truth and Justice Commission on the lasting impact of slavery and indentured labour (2009–2011)
- Commission of Inquiry on Horse Racing in Mauritius (2014–2016)
- Commission of Enquiry on Drug Trafficking (2015–2018)
- Commission of Inquiry on the sale of Britam and BAI (2017–ongoing)
- Commission of Inquiry on violation of the Constitution and other laws by former President Ameenah Gurib-Fakim (2018–ongoing)

=== New Zealand ===
- Royal Commission on Mines (1911)
- Royal Commission of Inquiry into the Ballantyne's fire (1947–1948)
- Royal Commission on Accident Compensation (1966–1967), which produced the Woodhouse Report and led to the formation of the Accident Compensation Corporation in 1974
- Royal Commission on Contraception, Sterilisation and Abortion (1975–1977)
- Royal Commission into the Courts (1976–1978)
- Royal Commission on Nuclear Power Generation in New Zealand (1976–1978)
- Royal Commission on Maori Courts (1978–1980)
- Royal Commission to Inquire into and Report upon the Circumstances of the Convictions of Arthur Allan Thomas for the Murders of David Harvey Crewe and Jeanette Lenore Crewe (1980–1981)
- Royal Commission of Inquiry into the crash of Air New Zealand Flight 901 (Erebus inquiry) (1980–1981) The findings were successfully appealed to the Privy Council, setting new legal standards for the conduct of royal commissions.
- Royal Commission into Certain Matters Related to Drug Trafficking (1982–83)
- Royal Commission on the Electoral System (1984–1986) – investigated the electoral system, and led to New Zealand adopting the mixed member proportional voting system in 1993
- Royal Commission on Broadcasting and Related Telecommunications (1985–1986)
- Royal Commission on Social Policy (1986–1988)
- Royal Commission on Genetic Modification (2000–2001) to look into and report on the issues surrounding genetic modification in New Zealand
- Royal Commission on Police Conduct (2004–2007)
- Royal Commission on Auckland Governance (2007–2009)
- Royal Commission on the Pike River Mine tragedy (2011–2012)
- Royal Commission of Inquiry into Building Failures Caused by Canterbury Earthquakes (2011–2012)
- Royal Commission of Inquiry into Abuse in Care (2018–2024)
- Royal Commission of Inquiry into Christchurch mosque shootings (2019–2020)
- Royal Commission of Inquiry into COVID-19 Lessons Learned

=== United Kingdom ===
- Royal Commission for inquiring into the nature and extent of the Instruction afforded by the several Institutions in Ireland established for the purpose of Education (1824)
- Royal Commission on the Poorer Classes in Ireland (1833)
- Royal Commission on the Criminal Law (1833–1845)
- Royal Commission of Inquiry into the condition of the Hand-loom Weavers in England and Wales, Gloucestershire section (W. A. Miles, c. 1938)
- Royal Commission of Inquiry into Children's Employment (1840–1843)
- Royal Commission on Defaults of Official Assignees of Court of Bankruptcy (1841–1843)
- Royal Commission on Improvement of the Metropolis (1842–1851)
- Royal Commission on Midland Mines (1842–1843)
- Royal Commission on Health of Towns (1843–1848)
- Royal Commission on South Wales Turnpikes (1843–1844)
- Royal Commission on Framework Knitters (1844–1845)
- Royal Commission on Collapse of Mill at Oldham and Prisons at Northleach (1844–1855)
- Royal Commission on Revising and Consolidating the Criminal Law (1845–1849)
- Royal Commission on Tidal Harbours (1845–1846)
- Royal Commission on Judicial Circuits (1845)
- Royal Commission on Railway Gauges (1845–1846)
- Royal Commission on Metropolitan Railway Termini (1846)
- Royal Commission on Millbank Prisons (1846–1847)
- Royal Commission on New Bishoprics (1847)
- Royal Commission on Registration and Conveyancing (1847–1854)
- Royal Commission on the British Museum (1847–1850)
- Royal Commission on Merchant Seamen's Fund (1847–1848)
- Royal Commission on Marriage Laws (1847–1850)
- Royal Commission of Application of Iron to Railway Structures (1847–1849)
- Royal Commission on Health of the Metropolis (1847–1850)
- Royal Commission on Episcopal and Capitular Revenues (1849–1851)
- Royal Commission on Subdivision of Parishes (1849–1856)
- Royal Commission on Charities (1849–1851)
- Royal Commission on Smithfield (1849–1850)
- Royal Commission on Common Law (Pleading) (1850–1860)
- Royal Commission on Oxford University (1850–1852)
- Royal Commission on Cambridge University (1850–1852)
- Royal Commission on Divorce Law (1850–1853)
- Royal Commission on Chancery (1850–1856)
- Royal Commission for the Exhibition of 1851 (1850) – planned the Great Exhibition; it still exists as a charitable body endowed by the proceeds
- Royal Commission on the Corporation of the City of London (1853–1854) – led to the establishment of the Metropolitan Board of Works, the first London-wide local government body
- Royal Commission on County Courts (1853–1855)
- Royal Commission on Birmingham Borough Prison (1853–1854)
- Royal Commission on Bankruptcy Law (1853–1854)
- Royal Commission on Leicester County Gaol (1853–1854)
- Royal Commission on Newcastle Cholera (1853–1854)
- Royal Commission for Consolidating the Statute Law (1854–1859)
- Royal Commission on the Health of the Army (1856–1857) based on Florence Nightingale's reports on medical care during the Crimean War
- Royal Commission on the Defence of the United Kingdom (1859)
- Royal Commission on the State of Popular Education in England (1858–1861) (the Newcastle Commission) – looked into the state of public education in England in order to report what measures were required "for the extension of sound and cheap elementary instruction to all classes of the people"
- Royal Commission on Transportation and Penal Servitude (1863)
- Royal Commission on the Sanitary State of the Army in India (1863)
- Royal Commission on the Public Schools (1861–1864) (the Clarendon Commission) – looked into the state of nine old-established public schools
- Royal Commission on Capital Punishment (1864–1866)
- Royal Commission on Historical Manuscripts (1869)
- Royal Commission on Scientific Instruction and the Advancement of Science (1875)
- Royal Commission on the Factory Acts (1876)
- Royal Commission on the Working of the Penal Servitude Acts &c. (1878)
- Royal Commission on Ship′s Tonnage Measurement (1880)
- Royal Commission on Technical Instruction (1881–1884)
- Royal Commission on Smallpox and Fever Hospitals (1881–1882)
- Royal Commission of Inquiry into the Condition of Crofters and Cottars in the Highlands and Islands (1883–1884) (the Napier Commission)
- The Royal Commission on the Housing of the Working Classes (1884–1885)
- Royal Commission on the Depression in Trade and Industry (1885–1886)
- Royal Commission on the Blind, the Deaf and Dumb and Others (1889)
- Royal Commission on Market Rights and Tolls (1889–1891)
- Royal Commission on the Amalgamation of the City and County of London (1889–1894)
- Royal Commission on Labour (1891–1892)
- Royal Commission Appointed to Inquire into the Water Supply of the Metropolis (1891–1893)
- Royal Commission on Secondary Education (1895) (the Bryce Commission)
- Royal Commission on Indian Expenditure (1896)
- Royal Commission on Tuberculosis (1896–1898) (the First Royal Commission on Tuberculosis)
- Royal Commission on Sewage Disposal (1898–1912)
- Royal Commission on Water Supply within the Limits of the Metropolitan Water Companies (1899) – led to the creation of the Metropolitan Water Board
- Royal Commission on the Port of London (1900–1902)
- Royal Commission on South African Hospitals (1901)
- Royal Commission on Tuberculosis (1901–1911) (the Second Royal Commission on Tuberculosis)
- Royal Commission on University Education in Ireland (1901–1903)
- Royal Commission on the War in South Africa (1902–1903) (the Elgin Commission)
- Royal Commission on Superannuation in the Civil Service (1903)
- Royal Commission on London Traffic (1903–1905)
- Royal Commission on the Control of the Feeble-Minded (1904)
- Royal Commission on the Poor Laws and Relief of Distress (1905–1909)
- Royal Commission on the Ancient and Historical Monuments of Scotland (1908–2015)
- Royal Commission on the Ancient and Historical Monuments of Wales (1908–present)
- Royal Commission on the Historical Monuments of England (1908–1999)
- Royal Commission on the Registration of Title in Scotland (1910)
- Royal Commission on Public Records (1910–1918)
- Royal Commission on Divorce and Matrimonial Causes (1912)
- Royal Commission on Fuel and Engines (1912)
- Royal Commission on Vivisection (1912)
- Royal Commission on the Housing of the Industrial Population of Scotland, Rural and Urban (1917) (the Ballantyne Commission)
- Royal Commission on the Universities of Oxford and Cambridge (1919) (the Asquith Commission)
- Royal Commission on London Government (1921–1923) (the Ullswater Commission))
- Royal Commission on Cross River Traffic in London (1926)
- Royal Commission on Agriculture in India (1926–1928)
- Royal Commission on Land Drainage (1927), chaired by Charles Bathurst, 1st Viscount Bledisloe – suggested sweeping changes in the administration of land drainage which were embodied in the Land Drainage Act 1930
- Royal Commission on Police Powers and Procedure (September 1928 – March 1929)
- Royal Commission on Local Government (1929)
- Royal Commission on the Civil Service (1929–1931)
- Royal Commission on Transport (1932)
- Royal Commission on the University of Durham (1935), chaired by Lord Moyne
- Royal Commission on Tithe Rentcharge in England and Wales (1936)
- Palestine Royal Commission (1937)
- Rhodesia-Nyasaland Royal Commission (1937–1939) (the Bledisloe Commission) – examined the possible closer union of Southern Rhodesia, Northern Rhodesia and Nyasaland, and recommended a union of Northern Rhodesia and Nyasaland but ruled out any political amalgamation involving Southern Rhodesia due to its overtly racial policies. The Commission's recommendations were not put in place owing to the Second World War.
- Royal Commission on the Distribution of the Industrial Population (1940)
- Royal Commission on the Press (1947–1949)
- Royal Commission on Betting, Lotteries and Gaming (1949–1951)
- Royal Commission on Population (1949)
- Royal Commission on Capital Punishment (1949–1953) (the Gowers Commission)
- Royal Commission on Scottish Affairs (1952–1954)
- Royal Commission on the Civil Service (1953–1955)
- Royal Commission on Marriage and Divorce (1956)
- Royal Commission on Local Government in Greater London (1957–1960) (the Herbert Commission) – made recommendations for the overhaul of the administration of the capital that were implemented in a modified form by the London Government Act 1963
- Royal Commission on the Press (1961–1962)
- Royal Commission on the Police (1962)
- Royal Commission on Medical Education (1965–1968)
- Royal Commission on Local Government in England (1966–1969) (the Redcliffe–Maud Commission)
- Royal Commission on Local Government in Scotland (1966–1969) (the Wheatley Commission) – made recommendations that led to a new system of regional and district councils in Scotland, implemented in 1975 under the Local Government (Scotland) Act 1973
- Royal Commission on Trade Unions and Employers' Associations (1968)
- Royal Commission on the Constitution (1969–1973) (the Kilbrandon Commission or Crowther Commission)
- Royal Commission on Environmental Pollution (1970–2011)
- Royal Commission on the Press (1974–1977)
- Royal Commission on Standards of Conduct in Public Life (1974–1976)
- Royal Commission on Legal Services (1976) (the Benson Commission)
- Royal Commission on Civil Liability and Compensation for Personal Injury (1973–78) (the Pearson Commission)
- Royal Commission on the Distribution of Income and Wealth (1977–1979)
- Royal Commission on the National Health Service (1975–1979), chaired by Sir Alec Merrison
- Royal Commission on Criminal Procedure (1981)
- Royal Commission on Criminal Justice (1991)
- Royal Commission on Long Term Care for the Elderly (1998)
- Royal Commission on the Reform of the House of Lords (1999)

== See also ==
- Presidential commission (United States)
