= Peter Oduori =

Kenyan accountant, businessman and corporate executive

- Born: c. 1971 (age 54–55); Kenya
- Education: University of Nairobi
- Occupations: Accountant, Businessman and Corporate Executive
- Years active: 1991 – present
- Known for: Leadership and business expertise
- Title: Managing director and chief executive officer at Housing Finance Company of Kenya

Peter Mugeni Oduori (born c. 1971), is a Kenyan accountant, businessman and incumbent managing director at Housing Finance Company of Kenya (HFCK), and the chief executive officer at that commercial bank. He was appointed to his current position in November 2021. Before that he was the company's director of credit and risk at HFCK.

== Background and education ==
Peter Mugeni Oduori is a Kenyan by birth. After attending local primary and secondary schools, he was admitted to the University of Nairobi (UoN), where he graduated with a Bachelor of Commerce degree. He continued to study at the UoN, where he obtained a Master of Science in Finance. He is also an affiliate member of the Association of Chartered Certified Accountants and Fellow of the Retail Banking Academy.

== Career ==
At the time he was appointed as CEO at HFCK, in November 2021, Oduori had a banking career going back over 20 years. He has experience in credit risk, leadership, management and bank operations. He has banking exposure in Kenya, East Africa and across the Africa continent. He has previously worked at Stanbic Bank Kenya, Stanbic Bank Tanzania and Standard Bank Group.

As managing director at HFCK, Oduori took over from Regina Anyika, the Group Legal Director and Company Secretary at Housing Finance Group of Kenya (HFGK), who held the position in acting capacity. The last substantive managing director at HFCK was Samuel Waweru. Waweru retired in April 2019.

== Other consideration ==
Oduori is an Associate member of the Professional Risk Managers' International Association (PRMIA) and is a Certified Bank Credit Evaluator, a South African qualification.

== See also ==
- Robert Kibaara
