= National Commercial Bank =

National Commercial Bank may refer to:

- NCB Financial Group, a Caribbean banking group headquartered in Jamaica
- National Commercial Bank (China), a defunct commercial bank that was based in Hong Kong
- National Commercial Bank Mauritius, a state-owned commercial bank in Mauritius
- National Commercial Bank (Saudi Arabia)
- National Commercial Bank of Scotland, a defunct Scottish commercial bank that was merged into the Royal Bank of Scotland
- Zambia National Commercial Bank, a commercial bank in Zambia
