= Benson Wairegi =

Kenyan accountant and business executive

Dr. Benson I Wairegi
- Born: 1953 (age 72–73); Kigumo, Kenya
- Education: University of Nairobi (Bachelor of Commerce) (Master of Business Administration); Certified Public Accountant of Kenya (Certified Public Accountant)
- Occupations: Accountant, Business Executive & Entrepreneur
- Years active: 1977 - present
- Title: Group Managing Director & Group CEO; Britam Holdings Plc
- Spouse: 1

Dr. Benson I Wairegi (born 1953) is an accountant and business executive in Kenya. He is the current Group Managing Director of Britam Holdings Plc (Britam), a financial services conglomerate headquartered in Nairobi, the Kenyan capital, with subsidiaries in Kenya, Uganda, South Sudan, Rwanda, Tanzania, Malawi and Mozambique. In Britam, he presided over the transformation of the company from a small home service insurance company, into a diversified financial services group operating in seven (7) countries, Kenya, Uganda, Tanzania, Rwanda, South Sudan, Mozambique and Malawi with interests in life insurance, general insurance, health insurance, retirement planning and property.

== Career ==
In 1977, at the age of 24, Benson Wairegi joined PriceWaterHouseCoopers as an audit trainee. In 1980, he went to join British-American as the Chief Accountant. In 1984, Kenyan regulators ordered all foreign-owned insurance companies to sell at least 33.3% shareholding to Kenyan nationals. Wairegi took out a KSh600,000 personal mortgage against his house and bought a 3.3% stake in Britam. He also encouraged other Kenyans to do the same. That same year, he was appointed chief executive officer at the company. Over the years, his investment in Britam has grown to KSh1.7 billion (US$19 million), as at February 2014.

== See also ==
- Equity Group Holdings Limited
- Housing Finance Company of Kenya
