= Simon Wachira (businessman) =

Kenyan businessman

- Citizenship: Kenyan
- Occupation: Businessman
- Known for: Owner of Magunas

Simon Wachira is a Kenyan businessman who owns Magunas, a supermarket chain in Kenya. He was born in Kenya's central region where he grew up. He started engaging in business activities as a hawker in Muranga. He then opened his first retail shop in the 1990, which grew to become a wholesale. He opened his first Magunas supermarket in Murang'a.

Magunas has grown to become a supermarket chain with outlets in the vast central region, and in the Nairobi, Kitui and Nakuru counties. Despite recent setbacks, the supermarket still maintains full operation.

His other ventures include Nokras Riverine Hotel & Spa in Sagana.

== Personal life ==
Wachira maintains a low public profile. He is a Christian.

== See also ==
- Naivas
- Peter Munga
