= Real Insurance Company of Malawi =

Company in Malawi

- Company type: Public
- Traded as: MSE:REAL
- Industry: Financial services
- Founded: 1959
- Headquarters: Blantyre, Malawi
- Key people: Grant Mwenechanya - CEO; Thomas Kanyuka - Chairman; Benson Wairegi - Director
- Products: Insurance
- Parent: Britam
- Website: Homepage

Real Insurance Company of Malawi Limited, commonly referred to as Real Insurance, is an insurance company based in Blantyre, Malawi.

== Overview ==
Real Insurance is the only listed insurance company on the Malawi Stock Exchange and offers a wide range of insurance products to both corporate and individual clients through its branch network across Malawi.

Real Insurance is the oldest insurance company in Malawi.

== History ==
Real Insurance Company of Malawi started operating in 1959 as Royal Insurance Company of Malawi, as a branch of UK based Royal Insurance. Following the merger of Royal Insurance and Sun Alliance in 1996, the business became part of the RSA Insurance Group. In 2000, the RSA Insurance Group decided to reorganize its African business. This reorganization led to the incorporation of the subsidiary and the transfer of its ownership to Kenyan-based REAL Insurance Company of Kenya Limited.

29 September 2008, Real Insurance Company of Malawi's shares started trading on the MSE after a successful IPO that was over-subscribed by 300%.

The company became a member of the British-American Investments Company in 2014 after the successful acquisition of its parent company through a deal that was valued at approximately US$16 million.

== Ownership ==
The shares of the stock of Real Insurance are traded on the Malawi Stock Exchange, under the symbol: REAL. The shareholding in the company's stock is as follows:

Real Insurance Company of Malawi Stock Ownership
Rank	Name of Owner	Percentage Ownership
1	Real Insurance Company of Kenya	65
2	Other shareholders	35
	Total	100.00

== Britam ==
Real Insurance Company of Malawi Limited is a member of the British-American Investments Company (Britam) Group, an East African financial services group, with headquarters in Nairobi, Kenya and listed on the Nairobi Securities Exchange. Britam has operational subsidiaries in seven Africa countries with investments ranging from insurance, real estate, asset management and banking.

== Governance ==
Real Insurance is governed by a six-person Board of Directors with Thomas O. B. Kanyuka as the chairman and Grant Mwenechanya as the CEO.

== See also ==
- British-American Investments Company
- Malawi Stock Exchange
