= Cytonn Towers =

Cytonn Square
- Location within Kenya

General information
- Status: Proposed
- Location: Kilimani, Nairobi, Kenya, Kenya
- Coordinates: 01°17′34″S 36°46′47″E
- Construction started: November 2018 (Expected)
- Completed: December 2022 (Expected)
- Cost: KSh 20 billion (US$200 million)
- Client: Cytonn Investments
- Owner: Cytonn

Height
- Height: 150 metres (492 ft)

Technical details
- Floor count: 35

Website
- Homepage

Cytonn Towers is a planned mixed-use skyscraper development, consisting of three towers of 35 storeys each, in Nairobi, Kenya's capital and largest city. The development is targeted towards the upper middle class, non-governmental organisations and diplomatic missions.

== Location ==
The skyscraper complex would be located at the southeastern corner of Elgeyo Marakwet Road and Argwings Kodhek Road, on a 4 acres (16,000 m^{2}) piece of land, in the Kilimani neighborhood of Nairobi, approximately 7 kilometres (4 mi), by road, west of the city centre. The geographical coordinates of the proposed real estate development are: 01°17'34.0"S, 36°46'47.0"E (Latitude:-1.292778; Longitude:36.779722).

== Overview ==
The development is owned by Cytonn Investments Management Limited, a privately-owned equity investment company. It consists of three towers, the tallest of which is 35 storeys tall.

It will consist of 180 hotel rooms, 160 serviced apartments, three bedroom duplexes and penthouse suites. There will be a total of 174,139 square feet (16,178.0 m^{2}) of rentable office and commercial space, on 30 floors. Three basement floors will accommodate 1,500 parked vehicles.

The mixed use development is aimed at satisfying demand for luxury housing, upscale business office space, hotel and conferencing venues. It is expected to host a sky-bridge restaurant, a ballroom, a fitness club and an observatory deck.

== Construction ==
The budgeted cost of construction is KSh 20 billion (approx. US$200 million). This includes KSh 1.5 billion (approx. US$15 million) used to acquire the land. Construction is expected to start in November 2018 and last until December 2022.

Funding will be provided by local and international fund managers, with Finnish asset manager Taaleri Plc, being the lead investor.
