= Department of Sustainability, Environment, Water, Population and Communities =

Former Australian government department

Department overview
- Formed: 14 September 2010
- Preceding Department: Department of the Environment, Water, Heritage and the Arts
- Dissolved: 18 September 2013
- Superseding Department: Department of the Environment (III)
- Jurisdiction: Commonwealth of Australia
- Headquarters: Canberra
- Employees: 2,871 (April 2013)
- Department executives: Robyn Kruk, Secretary (2010‑11); Paul Grimes, Secretary (2011‑13)
- Website: environment.gov.au

The Department of Sustainability, Environment, Water, Population and Communities was an Australian government department that existed between September 2010 and September 2013.

== Scope ==
Information about the department's functions and government funding allocation could be found in the Administrative Arrangements Orders, the annual Portfolio Budget Statements, in the department's annual reports and on the department's website.

At its creation, the department was responsible for:

- Environment protection and conservation of biodiversity
- Air quality
- National fuel quality standards
- Land contamination
- Meteorology
- Administration of the Australian Antarctic Territory, and the Territory of Heard Island and McDonald Islands
- Natural, built and cultural heritage
- Environmental research
- Water policy and resources
- Ionospheric prediction
- Co-ordination of sustainable communities policy
- Population policy
- Housing affordability
- Built environment innovation

== Structure ==
The department was an Australian Public Service department, staffed by officials who were responsible to the Minister for Sustainability, Environment, Water, Population and Communities.
