= National Commercial Bank Mauritius =

National Commercial Bank Limited
- Company type: State owned
- Industry: Financial services
- Predecessor: Bramer Banking Corporation
- Founded: 9 April 2015
- Defunct: 4 January 2016
- Fate: Merged with Mauritius Post and Cooperative Bank
- Successor: Mauritius Bank
- Headquarters: Port Louis, Mauritius
- Products: List: Loans Mortgages Investments Debit Cards Credit Cards
- Website: www.ncbl.mu

National Commercial Bank Limited, commonly known as NCB, was a financial institution based in Mauritius with its head office situated in Port Louis. It was one of the commercial banks licensed by the Bank of Mauritius, the country's central bank and the nation's banking regulator.

== History ==
National Commercial Bank Limited was incorporated on Thursday April 9, 2015 and issued a commercial banking license by the Bank of Mauritius on Friday April 10, 2015. National Commercial Bank acquired the assets and some liabilities of the now defunct Bramer Banking Corporation. This was after Bramer Banking Corporation's banking license was revoked by the Bank of Mauritius following a liquidity crisis at the bank. The bank accounts and operations of the former Bramer Banking Corporation were transferred to NCB on Saturday April 11, 2015.

On Monday January 4, 2016, NCB was merged into state-owned Mauritius Post and Cooperative Bank to form Mauritius Bank (MauBank). The newly formed bank received a banking licence on the same day.

== Ownership ==
National Commercial Bank was wholly owned by the Government of Mauritius.

== Leadership ==
The directors of National Commercial Bank were:

- Mr. Said Lalloo - (Chairman), appointed on April 9, 2015.
- Mr. Pravin Cumlajee (Director), appointed on April 9, 2015.
- Mr. Youk Siane Yip Wang Wing (Director), appointed on April 6, 2015.
- Mr. Anoop Nilamber (Director), appointed on April 6, 2015.
- Mr. Ram Prakash Nowbuth (Director), appointed on April 6, 2015.
- Mr. Nayen Koomar Ballah (Director), appointed on April 6, 2015.
- Mr. Louis Mario Hennequin (Director), appointed on April 8, 2015.
- Mr. Ashraf Esmael (Director), appointed on April 9, 2015.

== See also ==
- List of banks in Mauritius
- Bank of Mauritius
