= Bramer Banking Corporation =

Financial institution in Mauritius

Bramer Banking Corporation Limited
- Type: Public
- Industry: Banking and Finance
- Founded: 29 February 1988
- Defunct: 2 April 2015
- Fate: Liquidation
- Successor: National Commercial Bank
- Headquarters: Port Louis, Mauritius
- Key people: Dawood A. Rawat; Director
- Products: Loans, Mortgages Investments, Debit cards, Credit Cards
- Website: Homepage

Bramer Banking Corporation, commonly known as Bramer Bank, is a financial institution based in Mauritius with its head office is situated at Port Louis and currently under statutory management. It was one of the commercial banks licensed by the Bank of Mauritius, the country's central bank and the nation's banking regulator.

== Overview ==
Bramer Bank was part of the British American Investment Group, formerly one of the largest conglomerates in Mauritius with investments in banking, insurance, asset and wealth management, trade & commerce and services in Bahamas, East Africa, Mauritius, Malta, South Africa and UK.

== History ==
=== Founding ===
Bramer Banking Corporation Limited was formed on February 29, 1988 as South East Asian Bank Limited (SEAB) as a subsidiary of Bumiputra Commerce Bank (now CIMB bank) of Malaysia. In March 1990, SEAB took over the banking business of Habib Bank AG Zurich in Mauritius. In January 2003, CIMB bank increased its stake in SEAB to 60% subsidiary of CIMB.

=== Growth Years ===
In 2008, British American Investment Group acquired full control of South East Asian Bank and subsequently rebranded it to Bramer Banking Corporation. On May 9, 2012 Bramer Banking Corporation's stock began trading on the Stock Exchange of Mauritius (SEM) after the amalgamation of its business with The Mauritius Leasing Company (“MLC”) that was listed on the SEM and Bramer Holding Company. The amalgamation made Bramer Banking Corporation the third largest lender in Mauritius by market capitalisation and it remained a subsidiary of the British American Investment Group.

=== Liquidity Crisis and Closure ===
On April 2, 2015 Bramer Banking Corporation's banking license was revoked by the Bank of Mauritius to avoid systemic risks to the domestic financial system. Indeed, Bramer Bank had been experiencing large withdrawals of deposits placing it in a precarious liquidity situation in an alleged Ponzi scheme. A situation that was further worsened by Bramer Bank’s difficulty to raise funds on the interbank market. As a result, it was relying on overnight facilities from the Bank of Mauritius from March 6, 2015 in order to meet daily cash flow requirements. This liquidity crisis also affected Bramer Banking Corporation's sister company BAI Co. Both firm's stock were suspended from trading on the same day.

The Bank of Mauritius appointed Messrs. Mushtaq Oosman and Andre Bonieux of PricewaterhouseCoopers as the receivers pursuant to section 75 of the Banking Act 2004.

A new newly formed state owned bank known as the National Commercial Bank was incorporated and took over all the assets and liabilities of Bramer Banking Corporation. The State Bank of Mauritius provided limited assistance to the new bank.

== Ownership ==
As of December 31, 2013, the shareholding of Bramer Banking Corporation was as follows:

Bramer Banking Corporation stock ownership
Rank	Name of Owner	Percentage Ownership
1	British American Investment Group	74.04
2	Others via the SEM	25.96
	Total	100.00

== See also ==
- List of banks in Mauritius
- British American Investment Company (Mauritius)
- British-American Investments Company
