= Housing Finance Group of Kenya =

Coordinates: 01°17′06.4″S 36°49′10″E

- Type: Public company
- Traded as: KN: HFCK
- Industry: Banking and finance
- Predecessor: Housing Finance Limited
- Founded: August 3, 2015; 11 years ago
- Headquarters: Nairobi, Kenya
- Key people: Steve Mainda (Group chairman); Robert Kibaara (Group CEO)
- Products: Loans, mortgages, investments, debit cards, credit cards, insurance and philanthropy
- Revenue: Aftertax: KES:905.83 million (US$8.88 million) (2016)
- Total assets: KES:71.93 billion (US$705.11 million) (2016)
- Website: hfgroup.co.ke

Housing Finance Group of Kenya (HFGK), also Housing Finance Group Limited (HFGL), is a financial services holding company based in Kenya. HFGK maintains its headquarters in Nairobi, the capital and largest city, with subsidiaries and branches in major urban centers in the country.

== Location ==
The company headquarters are located in Rehani House, on Koinange Street, in Nairobi, Kenya's capital and largest city. The geographical coordinates of the company headquarters are:01°17'06.4"S, 36°49'10.0"E (Latitude:-1.285111; Longitude:36.819444).

== Overview ==
Housing Finance Group of Kenya is a non-operating financial services holding company, established in 2015 to comply with the country's banking laws. The changes are also in anticipation of expanding operations outside Kenya.

HFGK maintains the following subsidiaries:

- Housing Finance Company Limited (HFC Limited), a mortgage and retail bank
- Housing Finance Development and Investment Limited (HFDI), a property development and real-estate investment company
- Housing Finance Insurance Agency (HFIA), an insurance services company
- Housing Finance Foundation (HFF), an investment company specializing in installment purchase and lease finance for businesses and individuals

As of December 2016, the Group's total assets were valued at KES:71.93 billion (US$705.11 million), with shareholders' equity of KES:11.29 billion (US$110.67 million).

== Ownership ==
As of December 2016, the major shareholders in the stock of the holding company were as listed in the table below:

Housing Finance Group of Kenya stock ownership
Rank	Name of owner	Percentage ownership
1	Britam Holdings Limited* of Kenya	19.43
2	Equity Nominees Limited A/C 00104*	13.10
3	Britam Insurance Company (Kenya) Limited*	9.34
4	Britam Insurance Company (Kenya) Limited*	6.66
5	Standard Chartered Nominees	44.06
6	SCB A/C Pan African Unit Linked FD	3.38
7	Permanent Secretary Treasury of Kenya	2.41
8	Kenya Commercial Bank Nominees Limited A/C 915B	1.12
9	Standard Chartered Nominees Resd A/C KE11450	1.12
10	Kenya Commercial Bank Nominees Ltd. A/C 915A	1.12
11	Other institutional and private investors	38.26
	Total	100.00

* Britam Holdings Limited's direct and indirect shareholding in Housing Finance is 48.53%.

== See also ==
- Equity Group Holdings Limited
- KCB Group Limited
