= British American Investment Company (Mauritius) =

Financial company in Mauritius

- Industry: Business group
- Founder: Rawat Family
- Headquarters: Port Louis, Mauritius
- Number of employees: 4,000 (2009)
- Website: Homepage

British American Investment (BAIC) was an investment conglomerate based in Mauritius.

== Overview ==
British American Investment Company (Mauritius) Limited's investments range from financial services, trade and commerce, transport, real estate, leisure and hospitality and health care. The group has over 50 companies under these divisions with presence in Mauritius, South Africa, Madagascar, Kenya, Dubai, France and Malta.

The group was ranked the second largest group in Mauritius in 2010.

== Seizure by Republic of Mauritius ==
On April 3, 2015, BAIC's banking subsidiary, Bramer Banking Corporation, banking license was revoked by the Bank of Mauritius following an alleged US$693 million Ponzi scheme being run at the bank.

This alleged ponzi scandal also affected BAIC's insurance subsidiary, BAI Co. The firm's stock were suspended from trading on the same day and PricewaterhouseCoopers was appointed as the receiver manager then the law was changed and back dated to legalize the appointment of PWC. There has been evidence of Ponzi scheme and opinions in the country remain severely divided on whether the company was the victim of a political conspiracy or if the scandal was in fact a genuine Ponzi scheme. The question is that if Dawood Rawat is a role model or a master of swindling? On April 21, 2014 an international arrest warrant was issued for some of the BAIC directors wanted for fraud, money-laundering and embezzlement. The Mauritian Cabinet has since been drawing up plans to seize BAIC's assets and investments.

== Ownership ==
BAIC is a wholly owned subsidiary of Bahamas Based Seaton Investment which is in turn 85.8% owned by Klad Investment Corporation, the Rawat family investment vehicle.

== See also ==
- Bramer Banking Corporation
- British-American Investments Company
- CL Financial
