= Robyn Kruk =

Australian public servant

Robyn Kruk AO

Secretary of the Department of the Environment, Water, Heritage and the Arts
- In office March 2009 – 14 September 2010

Personal details
- Education: University of New South Wales
- Occupation: Public servant

Robyn Kruk AO (/ˈkrʌk/) is an Australian retired senior public servant and policymaker.

== Background and early life ==
Kruk graduated from the University of New South Wales in 1979 with a Bachelor of Science in Psychology (Honours).

== Career ==
Kruk began her career in the NSW public sector in 1980. In 1994 she was appointed Director-General of the NSW National Parks and Wildlife Service and in 2002 was appointed Director-General of the NSW Department of Health. She was in the role at the time of the Camden-Campbelltown hospital crisis, when whistleblower nurses made accusations that 19 deaths at the hospitals could have been avoided. In response to the crisis, Kruk convened a futures forum for top health administrators to start planning NSW health policy for the next 20 years. Kruk argued that the crisis drove a whole range of changes in the NSW health system.

At the end of her NSW public sector career she was Director-General of the Department of Premier and Cabinet. When Kruk left her top position in the Premier's department in 2008, the media reported that she told Premier Nathan Rees she no longer had the energy and commitment to continue. Shortly after, media stated that Kruk may have been concerned at excessive union influence and at the prominence of the NSW Finance Minister Joe Tripodi in mini-budget discussions.

In early 2009 she was appointed Secretary of the Commonwealth Department of the Environment, Water, Heritage and the Arts. During her time at the department, she oversaw the Energy Efficient Homes Package, a program beset by controversy after four workers died in separate accidents linked to program installations and house fires caused by insulation fitted poorly under the scheme. From September 2010, Kruk was suffering from cancer, and took extended sick leave from the role, with Paul Grimes acting in her position.

Following successful cancer treatment, Kruk returned to work in 2011 and was appointed the inaugural CEO and Commissioner of the National Mental Health Commission.

Following her retirement from the Commission, she undertook program reviews and was appointed to a range of non-executive board and statutory positions. Kruk was the Independent Assessor for the Defence Abuse Response Taskforce and led international taskforces assessing sustainable development in China. In 2014, she appeared before the Royal Commission into the Home Insulation Program. In 2015, she was appointed chair of the eHealth Implementation Steering Committee, to oversee delivery of an Australia-wide electronic medical record system.

Kruk is a Chair Emerita of the US-based Milbank Memorial Fund, a philanthropic health research organisation, and has been a judge of the Dubai government’s annual public sector excellence awards since 2013.

Kruk is a member of the NSW Planning Assessment Commission, the Chair of the NSW Ambulance Advisory Council, the Deputy Chair of Mental Health Australia, the Chair of the Victorian Expert Advisory Committee on Perpetrator Interventions, the Chair of the Western Australia Partnership Forum reporting to the Premier on improving community services and the Chair of Food Standards Australia New Zealand.

== Awards ==
In 2005, Kruk was appointed a Member of the Order of Australia for service to public administration in New South Wales. She was appointed Officer of the Order of Australia in the 2018 Queen's Birthday Honours for "distinguished service to public administration, particularly through mental health reform, to environmental protection and natural resource management, and to food standards".

Government offices
Preceded by David Borthwick	Secretary of the Department of the Environment, Water, Heritage and the Arts; 2009–2010	Succeeded by Paul Grimes as Secretary of the Department of Sustainability, Environment, Water, Population and Communities
