= Mauritian rupee =

Currency of Mauritius

Roupie mauricienne (French) Roupi morisien (Morisien) மொரீசியஸ் ரூபாய் (Tamil) मॉरिशियाई रुपया (Devanagari) (Note: Script used for Bhojpuri, Hindi, and Sanskrit, among others)
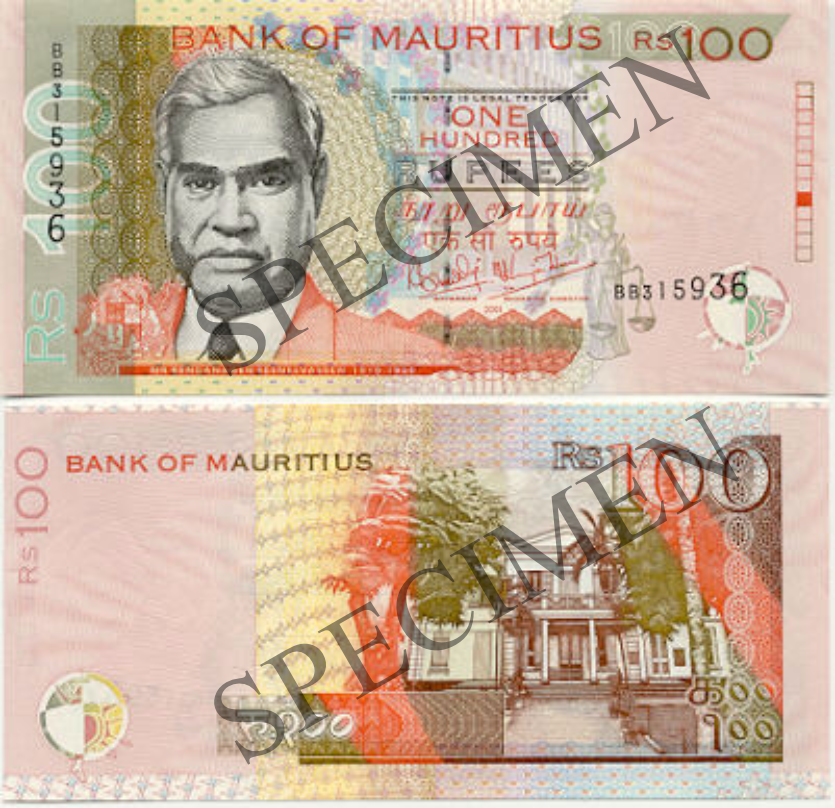
Rs. 100/- note obverse and reverse
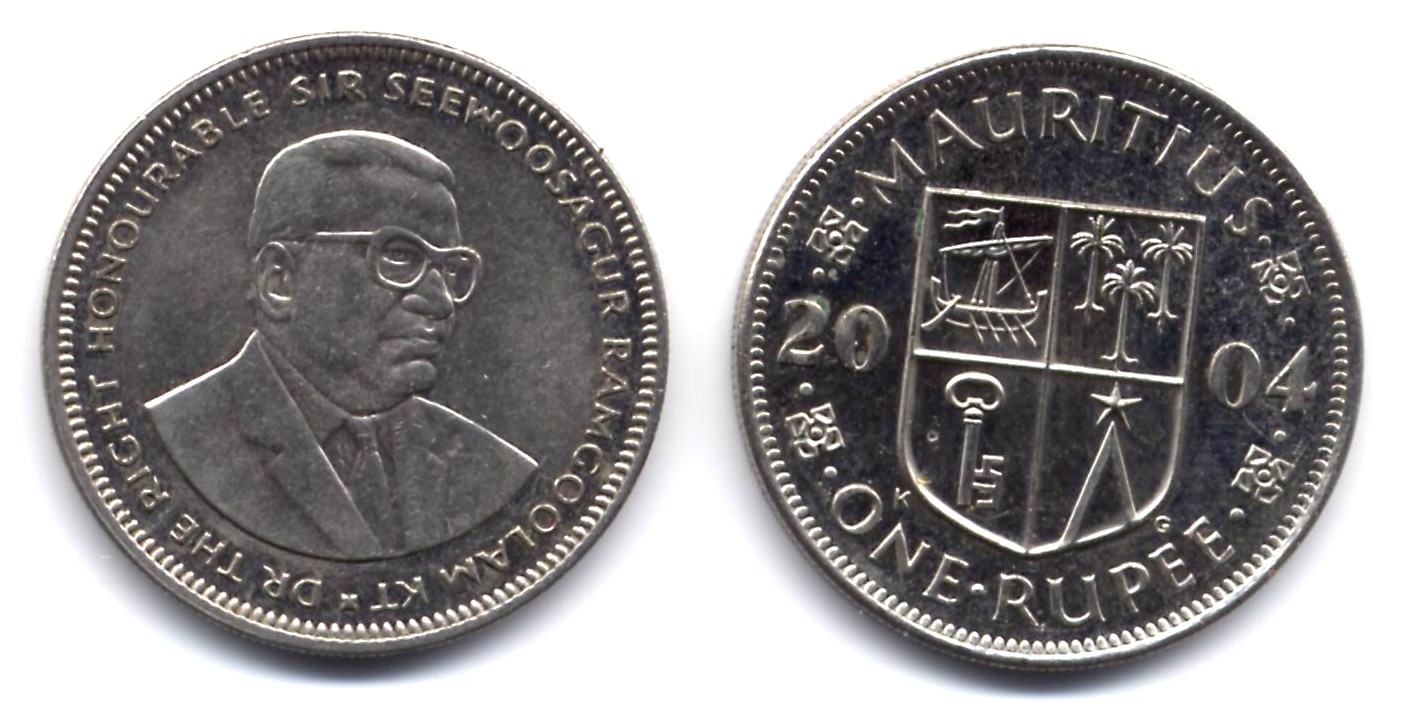
Re. 1/- coin obverse and reverse

ISO 4217
- Code: MUR (numeric: 480)
- Subunit: 0.01

Unit
- Unit: rupee
- Symbol: Re/Rs

Denominations
- Subunit
- 1/100: cent
- Symbol
- cent: c
- Banknotes: Rs. 25/-, Rs. 50/-, Rs. 100/-, Rs. 200/-, Rs. 500/-, Rs. 1,000/-, Rs. 2,000/-
- Coins: 5c, 20c, 50c, Rs. 1/-, Rs. 5/-, Rs. 10/-, Rs. 20/-

Demographics
- User(s): Mauritius

Issuance
- Central bank: Board of Commissioners of Currency of Mauritius (1849-1967); Bank of Mauritius (1967-)
- Website: www.bom.mu

Valuation
- Inflation: 4.5%
- Source: Bank in Mauritius, November 2023 est.

The Mauritian rupee (sign: Re (singular) and Rs (plural); ISO code: MUR; pronounced [ʁupi]) is the currency of Mauritius. One rupee is subdivided into 100 cents. Several other currencies are also called rupee.

== Coins ==
In 1877, coins for 1, 2, 5, 10 and 20 cents were introduced, with the lower three denominations in copper and the higher two in silver. Coin production ceased in 1899 and did not recommence until 1911, with silver coins not produced again until 1934, when Re. 1/4, Re. 1/2 and Re. 1/- coins were introduced. In 1947, cupro-nickel 10 cents were introduced, with cupro-nickel replacing silver in 1950.

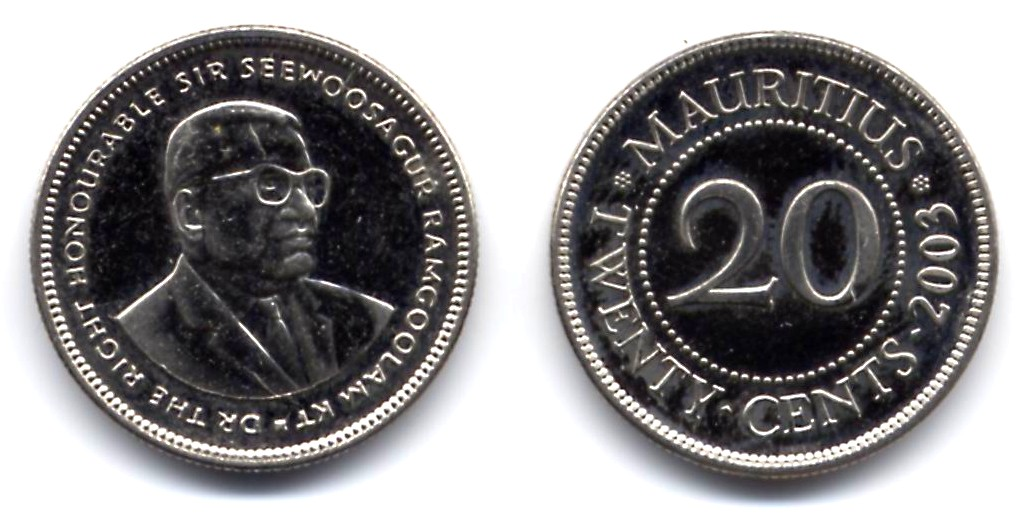
Mauritian 20c coin

In 1971 a new set of coins and banknotes were introduced by the Royal Mint. This set has Queen Elizabeth II on the obverse and a range of heraldic motives on the reverse. Some of the reverse designs for this set were designed by Christopher Ironside OBE including the Rs. 10/-, Rs. 200/- and Rs. 250/- (issued 1988).

In 1987, a new series of coins was introduced which, for the first time, did not feature the portrait of the monarch (Mauritius did not become a republic until 1992) but that of Sir Seewoosagur Ramgoolam. This coinage consisted of copper-plated-steel 1c and 5c (the 5c was substantially reduced in size), nickel-plated-steel 20c and Re. 1/2, and cupro-nickel Re. 1/- and Rs. 5/-. Cupro-nickel Rs. 10/- were introduced in 1997. Coins currently in circulation are the 5c, 20c, Re. 1/2, Re. 1/-, Rs. 5/-, Rs. 10/- and Rs. 20/-. Coins below Re. 1/- in value are generally regarded as small-change. The 1c coin has not been seen in circulation for many years, and the last series of 1 cent coins issued in 1987 are only seen as collector's items.

In 2007, a bi-metallic Rs. 20/- coin was issued to commemorate the 40th anniversary of the Bank of Mauritius, and this has now become a coin in general circulation.

Current Mauritian rupee coins
Image	Value	Composition	Diameter	Mass	Thickness	Edge	Issued
	1c	Copper-plated steel	17.8 mm	2 g	1.27 mm	Smooth	1987
	5c	Copper-plated steel	20 mm	3 g	1.5 mm	Smooth	1987-2017
	20c	Nickel-plated steel	19 mm	3 g	1.65 mm	Reeded	1987-2016
	50c	Nickel-plated steel	23.6 mm	5.83 g	2 mm	Reeded	1987-2016
	Re. 1/-	Copper-nickel	26.5 mm	7.45 g	1.8 mm	Reeded	1987-2010
	Re. 1/-	Nickel-plated steel	26.6 mm	7.5 g	2.2 mm	Reeded	2012-2016
	Rs. 5/-	Copper-nickel	31 mm	12.62 g	2.36 mm	Security	1987-2010
	Rs. 5/-	Nickel-plated steel	31 mm	12.55 g	2.8 mm	Security	2012-2018
	Rs. 10/-	Copper-nickel	27.5 mm (heptagonal)	5.83 g	2.2 mm	Smooth	1997-2000
	Rs. 10/-	Nickel-plated steel	28 mm (heptagonal)	8.5 g	2 mm	Smooth	2016-2023
	Rs. 20/-	Bi-metallic; copper-nickel center in nickel-brass ring	28 mm	10 g		Reeded	2007-2022

== Banknotes ==
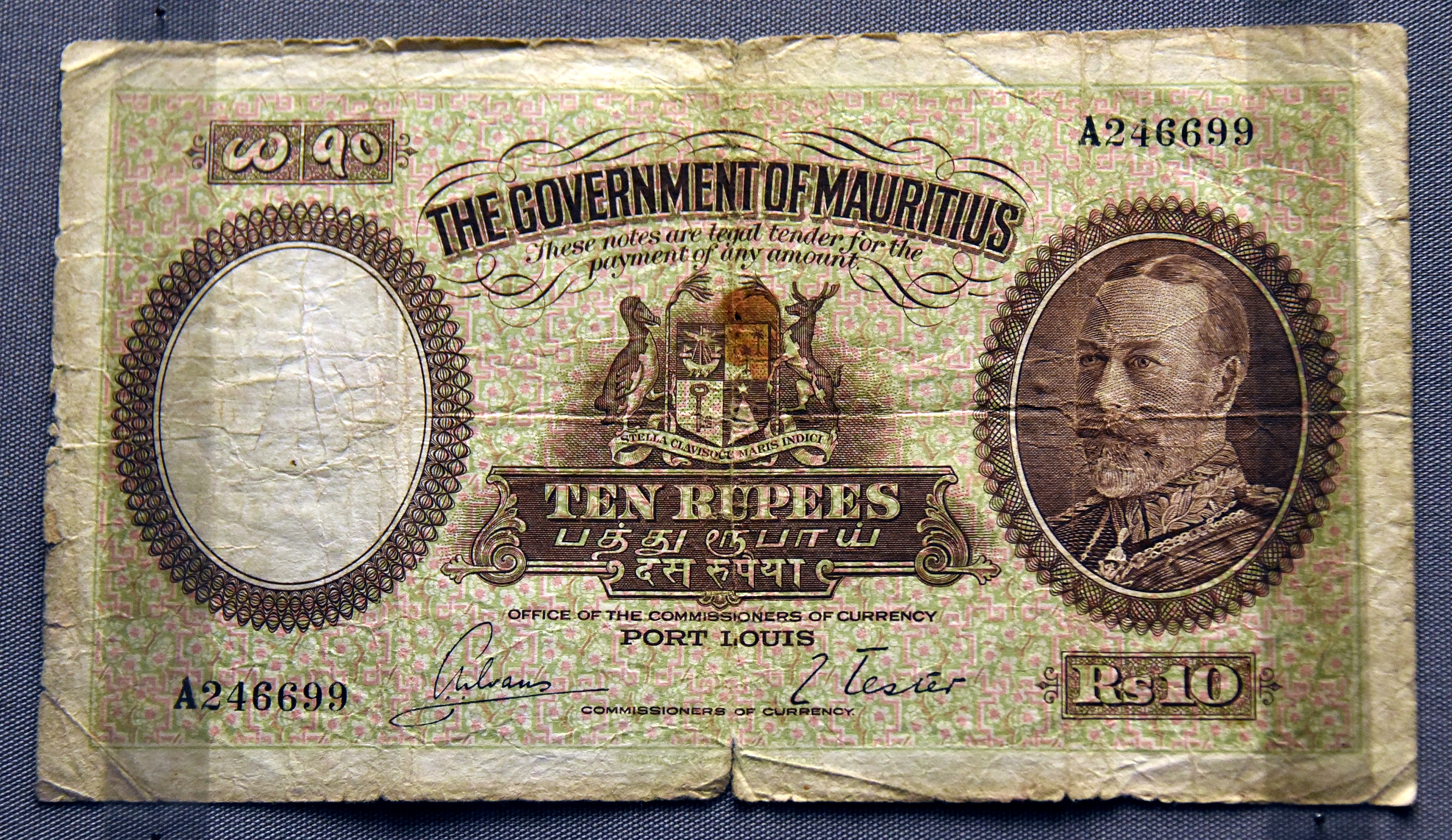
Rs. 10/- banknote, Government of Mauritius, 1930. On display at the British Museum in London

The first banknotes were issued by the government dated 1876 in denominations of Rs. 5/-, Rs. 10/- and Rs. 50/-. Re. 1/- banknotes were added in 1919. In 1940, emergency issues were made of 25c and 50c and Re. 1/-. In 1954, Rs. 25/- and Rs. 1,000/- were introduced.

The Bank of Mauritius was established in September 1967 as the nation's central bank and has been responsible for the issue of banknotes and coins since that time. The bank issued its first notes in 1967, comprising four denominations: Rs. 5/-, Rs. 10/-, Rs. 25/-, and Rs. 50/-, all undated and featuring a portrait of Queen Elizabeth II on the obverse. Over the years, some denominations were revised with new signatures of the Bank's Governor and managing director but were otherwise unchanged.

1967 "Elizabeth II" Issue
Image	Denomination	Obverse	Reverse
	Rs. 5/-	Queen Elizabeth II	Monument marking the landing of the Dutch at the bay of Grand Port (1598), sailing boat
	Rs. 10/-	Queen Elizabeth II	Government House, Port Louis
	Rs. 25/-	Queen Elizabeth II	Bullock cart
	Rs. 50/-	Queen Elizabeth II	Port Louis Harbour

In 1985, the Bank of Mauritius issued a completely new set of banknotes of Rs. 5/-, Rs. 10/-, Rs. 20/-, Rs. 50/-, Rs. 100/-, Rs. 200/-, Rs. 500/- and Rs. 1,000/-. A close study of these banknotes reveals an interesting array of subsets which were printed by two banknote printing companies (Bradbury Wilkinson and Thomas de La Rue). The banknotes were also designed at different time periods as there are very few identical and consistent design features appearing on all the denominations. Varying banknote numbering systems, different types of security threads, variations in the design and size of the Mauritian Coat of Arms, different ultraviolet light latent printing, inconsistent variations in the size incrementation between the denominations and multiple different typesets are just a few of the differences. This issue lasted up to 1998.

In 1998, The Bank of Mauritius made a new issue of banknotes consisting of 7 denominations, viz. Rs. 25/-, Rs. 50/-, Rs. 100/-, Rs. 200/-, Rs. 500/-, Rs. 1,000/- and Rs. 2,000/-. These banknotes had a standard format and were all issued simultaneously in November 1998. All the banknotes of this issue were printed in England by Thomas de la Rue Limited. These first banknotes were withdrawn from circulation in June 1999 following controversies due to the ordering of the text (English, Sanskrit, Tamil) as the Tamil population is said to have arrived in Mauritius prior to the North Indian community affiliated with Hindi.

The Bank of Mauritius made its latest issue of banknotes, which is still current, after June 1999.

=== Circulating banknotes ===
Current series (1999)
Image	Value	Dimensions (mm)	Substrate	Main colour	Description		Issued from
Image	Value	Dimensions (mm)	Substrate	Main colour	Obverse	Reverse	Issued from
	Rs 25	135 × 66	Paper	Violet	Sir Moilin Jean Ah-Chuen	Rodrigues	1999
	Rs 25	135 × 66	Polymer	Violet	Sir Moilin Jean Ah-Chuen	Rodrigues	22 August 2013
	Rs 50	140 × 68	Paper	Blue	Joseph Maurice Paturau	Le Caudan	1999
	Rs 50	140 × 68	Polymer	Blue	Joseph Maurice Paturau	Le Caudan	22 August 2013
	Rs 100	145 × 70	Paper	Orange	Renganaden Seeneevassen	Supreme court	1999
	Rs 100	145 × 70	Polymer	Orange	Renganaden Seeneevassen	Supreme court	20 June 2025
	Rs 200	150 × 72	Paper	Green	Sir Abdool Razack Mohamed	Market	1999
	Rs 200	150 × 72	Paper	Green	Sir Abdool Razack Mohamed	Market	14 October 2011 (Note: With holographic device.)
	Rs 200	150 × 72	Polymer	Green	Sir Abdool Razack Mohamed	Market	18 July 2025
	Rs 500	155 × 74	Paper	Brown	Sookdeo Bissoondoyal	University of Mauritius	1999
	Rs 500	155 × 74	Paper	Brown	Sookdeo Bissoondoyal	University of Mauritius	14 October 2011
	Rs 500	155 × 74	Polymer	Brown	Sookdeo Bissoondoyal	University of Mauritius	22 August 2013
	Rs 1000	160 × 76	Paper	Cyan	Sir Gaëtan Duval	State House	1999
	Rs 1000	160 × 76	Paper	Cyan	Sir Gaëtan Duval	State House	14 October 2011
	Rs 1000	160 × 76	Polymer	Cyan	Sir Gaëtan Duval	State House	2 December 2024
	Rs 2000	165 × 78	Paper	Red	Sir Seewoosagur Ramgoolam	Ox cart	1999
	Rs 2000	165 × 78	Polymer	Red	Sir Seewoosagur Ramgoolam	Ox cart	4 December 2018
For table standards, see the banknote specification table.

==== Obverse designs ====
The top of the note says "Bank of Mauritius". The portrait is toward the center-left of the note and below the portrait is the name of the person in the portrait and their year of birth to year of death. On the bottom-left is the coat of arms of Mauritius. There is also a drawing of the Bank of Mauritius building and a portrayal of the statue of justice in the background of each of the denominations in the centre of the note. The value of the note is in the top-right corner with the "Rs" symbol in front the value. Below the value in the top-right corner is a feature to aid the visually impaired. This is in addition to the differences in sizes between the banknotes of various denominations. The left side of the note says the numerical value of the note, with the "Rs" symbol to the left of the value, written sideways left-faced up. On top of the numerical value on the left side is the serial number of the note. The serial number is also on the centre-right of the note. On the top-center of the note is states "This Note Is Legal Tender For", then it states the note's value written out in English (ex: "One Hundred"), and below that it says "Rupees". Below that it says the value of the note in Tamil, and below that it says the value of the note in Bhojpuri. Below that is the signature of the Governor of the Bank of Mauritius and next to that is the signature of the managing director, or it could have the signatures of the First Deputy Governor, then the Governor, then the Second Deputy Governor. Below that is the year the note was printed.

==== Reverse designs ====
The top left of the note on the reverse says "Bank of Mauritius". The left side of the note says the numerical value of the note, with the "Rs" symbol to the left of the value, written sideways left-faced up. The top right of the note has the numerical value of the note with the "Rs" symbol to the left of the value. Each denomination carries a different vignette, depicting various aspects of Mauritius. The Devanagari script value of the note can be found on the left side of the bottom of the vignette, with the Devanagari abbreviation of rupee, "रु" ("ru") in front of the value. The Tamil and Gujarati numerical value of the note can be found on the right side of the bottom of the vignette. The Tamil value is above the Gujarati value.

== Commemorative coins ==
Value	Composition and finish	Mass	Diameter	Issue date	Commemorative subject
Rs. 25/-	Silver non-proof	38.61 g	38.61 mm	April 1978	10th anniversary of the independence of Mauritius
Rs. 20/-	Silver proof	28.28 g	38.61 mm	May 1998	50th anniversary of the wedding of Queen Elizabeth II and Prince Philip
Rs. 1,000/-	Gold proof	17 g	31.00 mm	January 2000	150th anniversary of the setting up of the Mauritius Chamber of Commerce & Industry
Rs. 10/-	Silver proof	28.28 g	38.60 mm	January 2000	150th anniversary of the setting up of the Mauritius Chamber of Commerce & Industry
Rs. 100/-	Silver proof	36.76 g	44 mm	November 2001	Centenary of the arrival of Mahatma Gandhi in Mauritius

Current MUR exchange rates
From Google Finance:	AUD CAD CHF CNY EUR GBP HKD JPY USD EUR JPY USD
From Yahoo! Finance:	AUD CAD CHF CNY EUR GBP HKD JPY USD EUR JPY USD
From XE.com:	AUD CAD CHF CNY EUR GBP HKD JPY USD EUR JPY USD
From OANDA:	AUD CAD CHF CNY EUR GBP HKD JPY USD EUR JPY USD

== See also ==
- Economy of Mauritius
- Seychellois rupee

== Notes ==
Preceded by: Indian rupee, Sterling, Mauritian dollar Ratio: both rupees = MU$0.5 or Rs. 10/25 = £1 stg	Currency of Mauritius; 1877 –	Succeeded by: Current
Preceded by: Indian rupee, Sterling, Mauritian dollar Ratio: both rupees = MU$0.5 or Rs. 10/25 = £1 stg	Currency of Seychelles; 1877 – 1914	Succeeded by: Seychellois rupee Reason: became a separate crown colony in 1903; Ratio: at par
