= Indur Ramphul =

Mauritian banker (1931–2019)

Sir Indur Ramphul

Governor of the Bank of Mauritius
- In office June 1982 – March 1996
- Monarch: Elizabeth II
- Preceded by: Goorpersad Bunwaree
- Succeeded by: Mitrajeet Dhaneswar Maraye

Chairman of the Offshore Banking Technical Committee

Personal details
- Born: 10 October 1931
- Died: 2019

Sir Indur Ramphul (10 October 1931 – 2019) was a Mauritian banker and the longest-serving Governor of the Bank of Mauritius (1982–1996). Renowned for reshaping the nation’s financial landscape, he modernized banking legislation, pioneered offshore banking, and chaired the Offshore Banking Technical Committee. He also represented Mauritius as alternate Governor at the International Monetary Fund.

== Recognition ==
In acknowledgment of his transformative contributions to Mauritius’ banking sector, he was honored with a knighthood by Queen Elizabeth II on 31 December 1990, following nomination by the Prime Minister. His rigorous leadership and dedication to staff welfare became hallmarks of his tenure.

== Personal life ==
Born on 10 October 1931, Ramphul studied public administration at the University of Exeter (1962–1964) and died in 2019, survived by his spouse and two children.
