= Robert Kibaara =

Kenyan banker and corporate executive

- Born: c. 1974 (age 51–52); Kenya
- Education: University of Sunderland; Chartered Institute of Marketing; University of Edinburgh
- Occupations: Businessman and Corporate Executive
- Years active: 1995 - present
- Title: Chief executive officer of Housing Finance Group of Kenya

Robert Kibaara is a Kenyan businessman, banker and corporate executive, who is the chief executive officer at Housing Finance Group of Kenya, the holding company of Housing Finance Company of Kenya, a commercial bank in that East African country. He assumed his current position in December 2018.

Before his current appointment, he was a banking executive at NIC Bank, before it merged with Commercial Bank of Africa to form NCBA Bank Kenya.

== Early life and education ==
Kibaara was born in Kenya circa 1974. He was raised in a polygamous family, with one father, three mothers and 30 children. His father died in 1988 and his mother died in 1995.

He holds a Bachelor of Banking and Finance, awarded by the University of Sunderland in the United Kingdom. He also holds a Diploma in Marketing, obtained from the Chartered Institute of Marketing, in the United Kingdom. In addition, he holds a Master of Business Administration, awarded by the Edinburgh Business School.

== Career ==
According to an interview that he gave in May 2021, Robert Kibaara dropped out of second year undergraduate studies at Kenyatta University, aged 21 years, in 1995, to pursue a banking career, his childhood dream. He was hired by Barclays Bank of Kenya (today Absa Bank Kenya Plc.), where he first worked as a bank teller.

Over the years, he took up banking studies overseas and has worked as a bank executive in a number of Kenyan commercial banks, including Standard Chartered Bank and National Bank of Kenya.

At HFGK, Kibaara has embarked on a process of converting the leading mortgage lender in the country, into a more balanced retail bank, with less reliance on one sector. He oversaw the closure of one subsidiary, Housing Finance Development and Investment Limited (HFDI), which was merged back into the parent company, to reduce losses and preserve capital.

== Personal life ==
Robert Kibaara is a married father.

== See also ==
- Peter Oduori
