= Dan Maraye =

Governor of the Bank of Mauritius
- In office April 1996 – November 1998
- Preceded by: Indur Ramphul
- Succeeded by: Rameswurlall Basant Roi

Personal details
- Born: Mitrajeet Dhaneshwar Maraye

Mitrajeet Dhaneshwar Maraye is a Mauritian financial expert and former Governor of the Bank of Mauritius, serving from 1996 to 1998. Since 2008, he has led Urban Infrastructure Capital Advisors, a Mauritius-based advisory firm.

== Career ==
Maraye began his career in education, teaching at Eden College while pursuing undergraduate studies at the University of Mauritius in the late 1960s. Relocating to London in 1971, he trained with a chartered accountancy firm until 1975. He earned associate membership with the ACCA in 1976, later achieving fellowship status in 1982.

His executive career spanned leadership roles in Mauritian institutions, including public utilities (Central Water Authority), media (Mauritius Broadcasting Corporation), and transport (National Transport Corporation). He also contributed to academia at the University of Mauritius and overseas at Scotland’s University of Abertay Dundee after departing Mauritius in 1992.

Since 2021, he has been the ombudsman for financial services.

== Personal life ==
Maraye is married and has three children, along with five grandchildren.
