= Peter Munga =

Kenyan businessman and entrepreneur

- Born: 1943 (age 82–83); Nyagatugu, Kenya
- Education: Certified Public Secretary
- Occupations: Businessman and entrepreneur
- Years active: 1963–present
- Known for: Former group chair of Equity Bank Group

Peter Kahara Munga is a Kenyan businessman and entrepreneur. Formerly, he was the chair of the Equity Bank Group, the largest bank holding company on the African continent by customer numbers, as of 31 June 2014. He is reported to be one of the wealthiest individuals in Kenya, with a personal net worth exceeding US$100 million as of February 2014.

== Early life and education ==
Munga was born in Kangema in Kenya's Central Province in 1943. He went to Gaichanjiru high school. He received an honorary Doctor of Philosophy degree from University of Nairobi.

== Career ==
In 1984, Munga founded Equity Building Society (EBS) in his hometown of Kangema, in Kenya's central highlands. With about KSh5,000 (about US$100 at that time) as starting capital, he convinced the Kenya government to issue him a license.

In 1993, Munga, as chairman, working in collaboration with the chief executive officer of EBS, hired James Mwangi, age 31, to wind up the insolvent organization. EBS was losing KSh5 million (approximately US$60,000 then) annually and had accumulated total losses of KSh33 million (approximately US$380,000 then). Mwangi, as director of finance at EBS, began to institute changes, resulting in the slow, but steady turn-around of the society. Also in 1993, Munga resigned as an assistant secretary in Kenya's Ministry of Water.

On 31 August 2004, EBS became Equity Bank Group and two years later was listed on the Nairobi Stock Exchange (NSE). On 18 June 2009, the bank's stock cross-listed on the Uganda Securities Exchange and started trading that day, under the symbol EBL. As of November 2014, the bank group has subsidiaries in Kenya, Uganda, Tanzania, Rwanda, and South Sudan.

== Investment portfolio ==
Munga owned shares of stock in the publicly traded companies listed below, as of November 2014.

Peter Kahara Munga's Investment Portfolio
Rank	Investment	Percentage Shareholding	Estimated Value (US$)
1	British-American Investments Company* Held through Equity Holdings Limited	11.9	65 million.
2	British-American Investments Company* Held directly	3.86	21 million
3	British-American Investments Company* Held through Filimbi Limited	1.66	9 million
4	Equity Bank Group*	0.42	3.0

== See also ==
- List of African millionaires
- List of wealthiest people in Kenya
