= Retail Banking Academy =

The Retail Banking Academy (RBA) is a UK-based educational body. It is the only educational and professional academy exclusively dedicated to retail banking anywhere in the world.

The organisation offers the Certified Retail Banker (CRB) designation, as well as ARB I and ARB II designations at the two Associate Retail Banker levels. The Retail Banking Academy has its headquarters in London, UK.

== History ==
The organisation was founded in London, UK in 2011 as the International Academy of Retail Banking with the objective of educating retail bankers worldwide to a professional standard.

In 2012 the UK Parliamentary Commission on Banking Standards accepted evidence from a number of participants operating in the banking sector. The Retail Banking Academy was one of the participants, and its submission was included in selected submissions in its final published report, Changing Banking for Good, which outlines the radical reform required to improve standards across the banking industry.

In October 2014, the organisation changed its name from the International Academy of Retail Banking to the Retail Banking Academy.

== Governance ==
The Retail Banking Academy is governed by a board of directors, an academic standards board, an awarding organisation and its governing body. The board of directors is chaired by Michael Lafferty (chairman of Lafferty Group, co-chairman of OMFIF and a former Financial Times journalist). The academic director is Professor Abdul Rahman, a former full professor of economics and finance and Telfer teaching Fellow at the Telfer School of Management, University of Ottawa.
