= David Borthwick (public servant) =

Australian public servant

David Borthwick AO, PSM

Secretary of the Department of the Environment, Water, Heritage and the Arts
- In office 3 December 2007 – January 2009

Secretary of the Department of the Environment and Water Resources
- In office 30 January 2007 – 3 December 2007

Secretary of the Department of the Environment and Heritage
- In office February 2004 – 30 January 2007

Personal details
- Born: David William Borthwick; 26 December 1950 (age 75) Ferntree Gully, Victoria, Australia
- Education: Monash University (BEc)
- Occupation: Public servant

David William Borthwick AO, PSM (born 26 December 1950) is an Australian former senior public servant and policymaker.

== Background and early life ==
Borthwick was the son of Bill Borthwick, former Liberal Deputy Premier of Victoria. Borthwick attended Monash University, gaining a Bachelor of Economics with First Class Honours.

== Career ==
Borthwick moved to Canberra in 1973 to join the Australian Public Service as a graduate in the Department of the Treasury.

He was appointed Secretary of the Department of the Environment and Heritage in 2004, remaining the Environment Secretary through two departmental transitions, first to the Department of the Environment and Water Resources and later to the Department of the Environment, Water, Heritage and the Arts.

Borthwick retired from the public service in January 2009. He delivered his valedictory speech at the Australian War Memorial, telling his audience that public service agencies of the day were "so flat out, so stretched" they had "scant capacity to invest in serious thinking."

== Awards ==
In June 2009 Borthwick was made an Officer of the Order of Australia for service to the development of environmental policy, particularly in relation to climate change, water allocation, emissions trading and heritage issues.

Borthwick had previously been awarded a Public Service Medal in June 2002.

== References and further reading ==
- Borthwick, David (16 March 2009), Wanna, John; Vincent, Sam; Podger, Andrew (eds.), As if for a thousand years—the challenges ahead for the APS (PDF), pp. 95–106, doi:10.22459/WBH.04.2012, ISBN 9781921862731, archived from the original (PDF) on 19 January 2014
- Malone, Paul (2006). "Chapter 15: Environmental Angler – David Borthwick, Department of Environment and Heritage". Australian department heads under Howard : career paths and practice (PDF). Canberra, Australia: The Australian National University. pp. 99–106. ISBN 1-920942-83-1. Archived from the original (PDF) on 6 November 2013.

Diplomatic posts
Preceded by Ed Visbord	Australian Ambassador to the OECD; 1991–1993	Succeeded by Trevor Boucher
Government offices
Preceded by Roger Beale	Department of the Environment and Heritage; 2004–2007	Succeeded by Himself as Secretary of the Department of the Environment and Water Resources
Preceded by Himself as Secretary of the Department of the Environment and Heritage	Department of the Environment and Water Resources; 2007	Succeeded by Himself as Secretary of the Department of the Environment, Water, Heritage and the Arts
Preceded by Himself as Secretary of the Department of the Environment and Water Resources	Department of the Environment, Water, Heritage and the Arts; 2007–2009	Succeeded by Robyn Kruk
