= Cytonn Investments =

International real estate company

- Industry: Investments & Real Estate
- Founded: 2014; 12 years ago
- Headquarters: Nairobi, Kenya, Nairobi
- Key people: Daniel Mugendi Njiru (Chairman); Edwin Dande (CEO); Shiv Arora ( Former CFO); Patricia Wanjama (Legal Officer); Elizabeth Nkukuu (CIO)
- Products: Real Estate, Structured Solutions, Private Equity & Advisory.
- Brands: Cytonn Real Estate, Cytonn Technologies, Cytonn Diaspora
- Website: www.cytonn.com

Cytonn Investments is an international real estate company and private equity firm with offices in Nairobi, Kenya and DC Metro Area in the United States.

== History ==
In 2014, four senior managers at publicly listed British-American Investments Company (Britam), left the company to form Cytonn. This included

1. Edwin Dande – Chief executive officer at Cytonn
2. Shiv Arora – Former chief financial officer at Cytonn
3. Patricia Wanjama – Head of Legal at Cytonn
4. Elizabeth Nkukuu – Chief investment officer at Cytonn

The move lead Britam to seek their removal from the roll of accountants, advocates and financial analysts by accusing them of collusion.

Cytonn posted a profit of Ksh 630 million in its first year of operation. The company has put a number of its business under Administration and 4,000 investors are in courts with Cytonn because of its failure to owner obligations.

== Cytonn’s investments are organised into four main classes ==
Private Equity Cytonn focuses in the areas of (a) Banking (b) Insurance (c) Hospitality (d) Education.

Real Estate Focusing in the areas of (i) real estate investments (ii) real estate backed fixed income notes and (iii) rent stabilized investments units. With ten Ongoing projects.

High Yield Includes:

- Cytonn High Yield Solutions (CHYS: For short term investors)
- Cytonn Project Notes: For medium to long-term investments

Asset Managers Cytonn Asset Managers offers a range of differentiated Unit Trust Products to both institutional and retail investors as well as foreign investors.

== Ownership ==
The company stock is owned by the four founders of the firm. In 2015, the founders sold 10 percent of the company stock to "high net-worth investors". The shareholding in the business is as depicted in the table below.

Cytonn Stock Ownership
Rank	Name of Owner	Position	Percentage Ownership
1	Edwin Dande, Shiv Arora, Patricia Wanjama & Elizabeth Nkuku	CEO, Former CFO, Legal Officer & CIO respectively	90
	Others	Equity partners	10.0
	Total		100.00

In February 2019, Cytonn's Chief Executive Officer, Edwin Dande, indicated that the firm was considering listing its shares on the Nairobi Stock Exchange and subsequently cross-listing on the London Stock Exchange.

== Controversy ==
The Kenyan Capital Markets Authority (CMA) on several occasions opened investigations into Cytonn High Yield Solutions (CHYS) and Cytonn Project Notes (CPN). The regulator does not regulate the two funds, which have failed to pay investors upon maturity of their investments totaling Sh13.5bn.

== See also ==
- British-American Investments Company
- Centum Investments
- Capital Markets Authority (Kenya)
- Economy of Kenya
