= Energy Efficient Homes Package =

Former Australian government policy

The Energy Efficient Homes Package was an Australian government program implemented by the Rudd Government. It was designed by the Department of the Prime Minister and Cabinet and was administered by the Department of the Environment, Water, Heritage and the Arts. The program consisted of two streams:

- Home Insulation Program, which was beset by controversy when the deaths of four workers in separate incidents were linked to the program, and the government under-estimated the level of risk involved; and
- Solar Hot Water Rebate Program.

Other programs that were closely tied in with the Energy Efficient Homes Package were the Green Loans Scheme (changed to the Green Loans Program and then the Green Start program, and later abolished), Living Greener, National Solar Schools, and the National Rainwater and Greywater Initiative (administered by the Department of Sustainability, Environment, Water, Population and Communities).

== Home Insulation Program ==
The Home Insulation Program was beset by controversy when the deaths of four workers in separate incidents were linked to the program and electricians warned that poor installation of metallic foil insulation could lead to further deaths or injury through electrocution. In response, the program was discontinued on 19 February 2010 and was replaced, for the interim, by the Insulation Workers' Adjustment Package which provided assistance to support the retention of insulation workers in the insulation industry or related industries until the Renewable Energy Bonus Scheme commenced on 1 June 2010.

=== Circumstances of the deaths ===
Four workers died in separate incidents: Matthew Fuller and Mitchell Sweeney were electrocuted installing foil lined insulation, Ruben Barnes was electrocuted installing fibreglass "pink batts", while Marcus Wilson died from hyperthermia, also installing "pink batts".

Fuller, a 25-year-old qualified electrician, died on 6 December 2009. Electrocution was due to a metal staple creating an electrical contact between the metal foil insulation being installed and live 240-volt AC electrical wiring. He had been booked in to complete the "Ceiling Installers Program" induction course but it had been postponed due to a prior personal commitment. His employer was of the view the laying of foil insulation with metal staples was not a high-risk practice for him as an electrician.

Sweeney, a 22-year-old experienced insulation installer, was similarly electrocuted due to a metal staple contacting live electrical wiring. He had completed the "Ceiling Installers Program", which was regarded by his employer as having provided adequate safety training. After the death of Fuller, government regulations required the use of plastic staples. However, Sweeney possessed his own staple gun designed for metal staples and preferred to use metal staples since he found they made installation faster.

Barnes, a 16-year-old apprentice carpenter, was electrocuted installing fibreglass insulation. He most likely came into contact with a metal ceiling batten which was floating at main's voltage due to contact with live electrical wiring. The wiring had been unusually placed during construction of the building, and subsequently, a screw used to attach fibreboard to the batten had penetrated its sheath, creating a dangerous hazard for anyone entering the roof space with the mains power switched on. Barnes had no specific safety training, with his employer believing that his previous experience as an apprentice carpenter was adequate.

Wilson, aged 19, died of complications related to hyperthermia on 21 November 2009. He was working in St Clair, a suburb in western Sydney, where temperatures had climbed to over 40 °C (104 °F). Despite some training at TAFE in installing insulation, Wilson had little experience and was filling in for a friend, unbeknownst to the friend's employer. Wilson was accompanied by an experienced installer, who removed roof tiles to provide some ventilation. However, the high ambient temperature and the strenuous work involved with lifting fibreglass "pink batts" into the roof space appear to have caused Wilson to become dehydrated. He was provided with a caffeinated soft drink by the homeowner, at his request, and his coworker encouraged him to take breaks as required. His coworker then told him to go and wait in the cabin of the truck they were using. Wilson apparently went to the truck, only to return to the roof space, having left his bag behind in the truck. The presence of the bag there gave the impression to the coworker that Wilson had walked off due to being disgruntled about the heat. The coworker went driving in search of Wilson when in fact Wilson had collapsed in the roof space and was found by the homeowner. He was rushed by ambulance to hospital where he later died.

The first coronial inquest was held in New South Wales for Wilson's death. The findings by the deputy coroner Hugh Dillon carefully avoided any political aspects and focused on the immediate circumstances of the incident.

An inquest is not a trial. Nor is it a wide-ranging Royal Commission. Contrary to media reports, this inquest is not an investigation of the Australian Government's Home Insulation Program although that is part of the background against which this inquest takes place. Because of the publicity given to that program and this inquest's slight connection with it, I will touch on it very briefly.

— Hugh Dillon, New South Wales deputy state coroner

A subsequent inquest by the Queensland coroner, Michael Barnes, a former tabloid journalist who worked for Rupert Murdoch, found that the risk of electrocution "was not appreciated" by government authorities at the outset of the home insulation program, despite it being raised by industry representatives. The coroner also referred the supervisors and employers of the three tradesmen to the Queensland Director of Public Prosecutions.

It is reasonable to conclude the dangers should have been foreseen and mitigated before three people died in Queensland and another in New South Wales.

Under our constitutional arrangements, workplace health and safety is primarily within the domain of State Governments.

Because a major focus of this program was the stimulation of the economy to counter the effects of the global financial crisis it needed to proceed far more quickly than that, but not at the cost of human life.
While the evidence indicates it was primarily failings in the planning and implementation of the HIP by Commonwealth agencies that led to an increased risk of harm, state-based workplace safety agencies failed to proactively respond to that increased risk and no review of why that occurred or how it will be avoided in future has been undertaken.

— Michael Barnes, Queensland coroner

=== Benefits of program ===
The insulation program covered 1.2 million homes and it has been estimated that by 2015 it will have produced savings of approximately 20,000 gigawatt-hours (72,000 TJ) of electricity and 25 petajoules (6.9×10^{9} kWh) of natural gas savings. All installations were conducted by private contractors as selected by home owners.

In Victoria, which has a high proportion of household gas space heating, a study on gas heating concluded that "the HIP program led to a reduction in energy consumption equivalent to delaying consumption growth by two years at a calculated abatement cost of AUD 238/tonne CO2-e, assuming no indirect or economy-wide rebound; however, any reduction in daily peak demand is not evident using the linear regression peak demand analysis."

=== Minister's responsibilities ===
On 26 February 2010, Peter Garrett, the government Minister in charge of the program, and his department, had the Home Insulation Program removed from their area of responsibilities. Greg Combet, the then Minister Assisting the Minister for Climate Change and Energy Efficiency was given the role of administering the transition between the Home Insulation Program and the Renewable Energy Bonus Scheme. Penny Wong was responsible for all other programs, such as the Green Loans Program, Green Start, Solar Schools, and Solar Cities. The Renewable Energy Bonus Scheme was administered by the Department of Climate Change and Energy Efficiency, prior to its abolition.

In May 2010, it was revealed that during 2009 Minister Garrett wrote to Prime Minister Rudd on several occasions raising concerns about unacceptably high health and safety risks; including advising the Prime Minister weeks before the three young tradesmen died.

=== Alleged fraud ===
Allegations of fraud under the program were later made, with three cases forwarded to the Australian Federal Police for investigation. In March 2010 the Federal Government announced a proposal to remove foil insulation or make it safe from 50,000 houses and undertake another 150,000 inspections. In March 2011, 35 search warrants were executed targeting alleged fraud by businesses and individuals in New South Wales, Queensland and Victoria. Climate Change and Energy Efficiency Minister, Greg Combet, stated that the Government is to pursue those alleged unscrupulous operators who had fraudulently abused this program.

=== Australian National Audit Office ===
The Auditor-General, Ian McPhee, identified shortcomings in the way the Department of the Environment, Water, Heritage and the Arts handled the program's implementation as it faced pressure to establish the program during the 2008 financial crisis. The report stated that the department requested the program be rolled out over five years but that this request was denied because of the desire to stimulate the economy and create jobs. McPhee also reported the department underestimated the level of risk involved in an unregulated industry which used inexperienced workers to install insulation in ceiling spaces, McPhee stated:

The focus by the department on the stimulus objective overrode risk management practices that should have been expected given the inherent program risks.
The department intended to rely heavily on its compliance and audit program to address some of the risks identified, but the significant delay in implementing this element of the program meant that these risks were not adequately addressed.

— Ian McPhee, Australian Auditor-General.

At its peak, demand for the program more than doubled original expectations. In his report, McPhee stated that as problems mounted, the then minister, Peter Garrett, did not have his requests for information answered promptly and then, when it was provided, it was "overly optimistic" and contained factual errors. The Auditor-General did not make any recommendations because the program was closed by the time he reported.

=== Scheme expiration ===
On 22 April 2010, the then Minister Assisting the Minister for Climate Change and Energy Efficiency, Greg Combet, announced that the Federal Government would abandon the scheme that was planned to replace the Home Insulation Program. Combet also revealed that about half of the 73,000 rebate claims did not comply with the program rules. The replacement scheme was axed after advice from former Secretary of the Defence Department, Dr Allan Hawke. The cost of the Home Insulation program was estimated to have cost around $1 billion and another $1 – $1.5 billion was needed to rectify the problems associated with the program.

=== Compensation ===
In May 2010, the Federal Government announced that it would give cash handouts of up to $500,000 to insulation companies affected by the abolition of the rebate scheme. Combet said applications had opened for a $15 million compensation fund. The Government said reputable companies would receive a cash payment calculated at 15 per cent of the total value of their stock, assistance will not be provided to companies with foil insulation products.

=== Legal action ===
On 6 May 2010, the Queensland's Department of Justice and Attorney-General charged QHI Installations (based in Beenleigh), its director, and its manager under the Electrical Safety Act, 2002 (QLD). On 29 June 2010 Queensland's Justice Department charged Arrow Property Maintenance Pty Ltd (based in Rockhampton), for alleged breaches of the Electrical Safety Act and the Workplace Health and Safety Act, 1995 for allegedly failing to run its business safely.

=== Royal Commission ===
On 12 December 2013, the Attorney-General George Brandis and the Minister for the Environment Greg Hunt announced that the Governor-General has authorised the establishment of a Royal Commission to "inquire and report into the deaths, serious injuries and impacts on longstanding home insulation businesses alleged to have arisen from the (Home Insulation) Program". On Monday 23 December 2013, the inquiry commenced in Brisbane headed by Ian Hanger AM QC. Former Prime Minister Kevin Rudd and former Minister for the Environment, Heritage and Arts Peter Garrett gave evidence.

== Green Loans scheme ==
On 23 April 2010, Minister Wong announced an audit of approximately 9,000 assessors of its Green Loans scheme. Assessors linked with the program were audited after reports of potentially fraudulent activities. Breaches were referred to the Australian Federal Police. In August 2010, one hundred assessors lodged claims for compensation after the Green Loans Scheme was axed in early 2010.
