= Housing Finance Company of Kenya =

Kenyan commercial bank

Housing Finance Company
- Type: Subsidiary of HF Group
- Traded as: KN: HFCK
- Industry: Banking
- Founded: 18 November 1965; 60 years ago
- Headquarters: Nairobi, Kenya
- Key people: Kaushik Manek; Chairman; Peter Oduori; Managing Director
- Products: Loans, Checking, Savings, Investments, Mortgages
- Revenue: ▼Aftertax:KSh1,629,681,000 (US$14.6 million) (2020)
- Total assets: KSh55.4 billion (US$497 million) (2020)
- Number of employees: 413 (2020)
- Website: hfgroup.co.ke

Housing Finance Company Limited (HFC Limited), commonly referred to as Housing Finance, is a commercial bank in Kenya, regulated by the Central Bank of Kenya, the central bank and national banking regulator. HFC is major mortgage lender in Kenya and was the second-largest in the market with KSh33.7 billion (approx. US$302 million) in mortgage loans, as of December 2019. At that time, Kenya Commercial Bank, the largest mortgage lender in the country had KSh64.3 billion (approx. US$577 million) in mortgage loans.

== Overview ==
Housing Finance Company Limited is a large mortgage finance company, serving the mortgage needs of the Kenyan population. As of December 2020, the company's total assets were valued at KSh55,445,249,000 (approximately US$497 million), with shareholders' equity of KSh8.562 billion (approx. US$76.8 million).

== History ==
The company was established in November 1965, to promote a savings culture and home ownership among the citizens of newly independent Kenya. Major investors in the company included the Commonwealth Development Corporation (CDC), whose shareholding at one time was as high as 60%, and the Government of Kenya, which at one time owned 50% of the company. CDC has since divested from Housing Finance Limited and the Kenyan Government has substantially reduced its shareholding.

In 1992 Housing Finance Company of Kenya became listed on the Nairobi Stock Exchange, where the stock of its holding company (Housing Finance Group of Kenya), trades under the symbol HFCK. The company adopted the shorter name of Housing Finance Limited, in 2002. In 2010, the Central Bank of Kenya, authorized HFL to issue and operate checking accounts; having been authorized to issue and operate savings accounts in the past.

On 30 June 2014, British-American Investments Company (the second largest shareholder in HFCK) at that time, served the Housing Finance's board with a takeover notice to acquire Equity Group Holdings Limited's 24.76 percentage shareholding in the mortgage financier. This move increased Britam's stake in HFCK to 46.08 percent. With the conclusion of that transaction, Equity Group Holdings Limited ended its seven-year investment in Housing Finance.

== Formation of holding company ==
In December 2014, HFCK commenced a restructure of its operations. The restructure involved the following: (a) the incorporation of a new wholly owned subsidiary under the name “HFC Limited” (b) the transfer of the company's banking and mortgage finance business to its newly incorporated subsidiary, HFC Limited and (c) the changing of the company's name to “HF Group Limited” and operating as a non-operating holding company. This is in accordance with the CBK Banking Act and Prudential Guidelines.

== Ownership ==
Housing Finance Company of Kenya is a wholly owned subsidiary of Housing Finance Group Limited, a non-operating holding company, whose shares trade on the Nairobi Stock Exchange.

== Branch network ==
The company maintains branches at the following locations:

1. Rehani Branch – Rehani House, Kenyatta Avenue at Koinange Street, Nairobi
2. Gill House Branch – Gill House, Moi Avenue, Nairobi
3. Buru Buru Branch – Epren Centre, Buru Buru, Nairobi
4. Mombasa Branch – Permanent House, Moi Avenue, Mombasa
5. Nakuru Branch – AFC Building, Geoffrey Kamau Way, Nakuru
6. Nyeri Branch – Kimathi Way, Nyeri
7. Eldoret Branch -KVDA Plaza, Oloo Street at Utalii Street, Eldoret
8. Kisumu Branch – Tivoli Centre, Court Road, Kisumu
9. Thika Branch – Uhuru Street, Thika
10. Meru Branch – Westwind Annex Plaza, Tom Mboya Street, Meru
11. Kitengela Branch – Red Heron Centre, Kitengela
12. Ongata Rongai Branch – Maasai Mall, Ongata Rongai
13. Komarock
14. Embu Branch
15. Nanyuki Branch
16. River Road Branch
17. TRM Branch
18. Sameer Park Branch
19. Naivasha Branch
20. Machakos Branch
21. Hurlingham Branch.

== Governance ==
Kaushik Manek, is the chairman of the board of directors at HFCG, the group holding company. Robert Kibaara is the group managing director of Housing Finance Group of Kenya. Peter Oduori, is the managing director and chief executive officer of Housing Finance Company of Kenya, the banking and mortgage subsidiary of the group.

== See also ==
- List of banks in Kenya
- British-American Investments Company
- Central Bank of Kenya
- Economy of Kenya
