= List of banks in Mauritius =

This is a list of commercial banks in Mauritius, as updated in late 2024 by the Bank of Mauritius.

== List of commercial banks ==
- ABC Banking Corporation Limited
- Absa Bank (Mauritius) Limited, part of Absa Group
- AfrAsia Bank Limited
- Bank of Baroda Mauritius, part of Bank of Baroda Group
- Bank of China (Mauritius) Limited, part of Bank of China Group
- Bank One Limited
- Banque Patronus Limitée
- BCP Bank (Mauritius) Limited, part of BCP Group
- HSBC Bank (Mauritius) Limited, part of HSBC Group
- Investec Bank (Mauritius) Limited, part of Investec Group
- MauBank Limited, state-owned
- SBI (Mauritius) Limited, part of State Bank of India Group
- SBM Bank (Mauritius) Limited
- Silver Bank Limited (acquired BanyanTree Bank Limited)
- Standard Bank (Mauritius) Limited, part of Standard Bank Group
- Standard Chartered Bank (Mauritius) Limited, part of Standard Chartered Group
- Mauritius Commercial Bank Limited
- Warwyck Private Bank Limited

== See also ==
- List of companies of Mauritius
- List of banks in Africa
