= Department of the Environment, Water, Heritage and the Arts =

Australian government department, 2007–2010

Department overview
- Formed: 3 December 2007
- Preceding Department: Department of the Environment and Water Resources
- Dissolved: 14 September 2010
- Superseding Department: Department of Sustainability, Environment, Water, Population and Communities
- Jurisdiction: Commonwealth of Australia
- Department executives: David Borthwick, Secretary (2007‑09); Robyn Kruk, Secretary (2009‑10)
- Website: environment.gov.au

The Department of the Environment, Water, Heritage and the Arts was an Australian Government department that existed between December 2007 and September 2010.

== Scope ==
Information about the department's functions and government funding allocation could be found in the Administrative Arrangements Orders, the annual Portfolio Budget Statements and in the department's annual reports.

According to the Administrative Arrangements Order made at the department's establishment, the department dealt with:

- Environment protection and conservation of biodiversity
- Air quality
- National fuel quality standards
- Land contamination
- Meteorology
- Administration of the Australian Antarctic Territory, and the Territory of Heard Island and McDonald Islands
- Natural, built and movable cultural heritage
- Environmental research
- Water policy and resources
- Cultural affairs, including support for the arts
  - There was a domestic Return of Indigenous Cultural Property (RICP) program run by DEWHA, which supported the return of both human remains and secret sacred objects from institutions within Australia (at some point this functionality was incorporated in the International Repatriation Program (IRP), administered by the Department of Communications and the Arts.)
- Ionospheric prediction
- Community and household renewable energy programs
