= Britam Holdings =

Kenyan financial service company

Britam Holdings PLC
- Type: Public
- Traded as: KN: BRIT
- Industry: Insurance, Investments, Property, Financial services
- Founded: 1965; 61 years ago
- Headquarters: Britam Tower, Upper Hill; Nairobi, Kenya
- Key people: Mohamed Said Karama, Acting Chairman; Tom Gitogo, Group Managing Director
- Products: List: Insurance Asset Management Property REITs Banking Holding
- Revenue: ▲KES: 27.667 billion (2019)
- Operating income: ▲KES: 36.4 billion (2019)
- Net income: ▲KES: 3.73 billion (2014)
- Total assets: ▲KES: 125.244 billion (2019)
- Total equity: ▲KES: 22.67 billion (2017)
- Website: www.britam.com

Britam Holding PLC is a leading diversified financial services group and is listed on the Nairobi Securities Exchange. The group has presence in seven Africa countries in Kenya, Uganda, Tanzania, Rwanda, South Sudan, Mozambique and Malawi.

Britam offers a wide range of financial products and services which include: Asset Management, Life Assurance, Retirement Planning, General Insurance, Health Insurance, Banking and Property Insurance.

== Overview ==
Britam's headquarters are in Nairobi, Kenya, with subsidiaries in Kenya, Uganda, South Sudan, Rwanda, Tanzania, Malawi, and Mozambique. The flagship company of the group is the Britam Holding Plc, commonly referred to by its brand name Britam Kenya.

According to the Insurance Regulatory Authority report released in 2019, Britam Life Assurance was ranked first in market share with 24.7 percent.

== History ==
=== 1965–1999 ===
The group's operations commenced in Kenya in 1965 with the opening of the first office in Nairobi as a foreign branch of British-American Insurance Company Limited, headquartered in the Bahamas. A local company was incorporated on 14 November 1979 as British-American Insurance Company (Kenya) Limited under the Companies Act as a private limited liability company following a government directive that all branches of foreign owned insurance companies must be incorporated locally. By this time, the Company had established nine branches across Kenya. This local incorporation represented the first step in the localisation of the Company. In 1984, local Kenyan investors acquired 33.33 percent of the shareholding in line with government directives.

=== 2000–2009 ===
In 2004, the group incorporated British-American Asset Managers whose core business was the provision of Investment advisory and Fund management services. The company offers investment funds, structured as Unit trusts and discretionary Portfolio management, to both institutions and private clients. During the same year, the group restructured, creating a non-operating holding company. Also in 2004, Britam acquired a strategic equity stake in the Equity Group Holdings Limited. Britam made its first equity acquisition in Housing Finance Company of Kenya (the largest mortgage finance provider in East Africa) in 2007.

=== 2010–date ===
2010 marked Britam's regional expansion commencing with the group's expansion into Uganda with the incorporation of Britam Insurance Company (Uganda) Limited, which commenced business on 24 November 2010, following the issuance of an insurance license by the Uganda Insurance Commission.

In 2011, the shares of British-American Investments Company were listed on the Nairobi Securities Exchange through an undersubscribed initial public offering. This was largely the result of risk-averse foreign investors shunning the IPO because of the Eurozone crisis and a sluggish U.S economy. Britam Insurance Company (South Sudan) Limited was incorporated in February 2012 and is licensed to underwrite all classes of life and non-life insurance. In Rwanda, Britam Insurance Company (Rwanda) Limited, was incorporated and licensed in 2013 by the National Bank of Rwanda.

On 9 December 2013, the British-American Investments Company entered into a definitive Share Purchase Agreement with Royal Ngao Holdings to acquire its 99 percent shareholding in Real Insurance Company Limited, a deal that was valued at KSh1.4 billion (approximately US$16 million then). 60% of the sales price was paid in cash and 40% was paid by issuance of new shares in British-American Investments Company. Real Insurance was licensed insurer carrying out General insurance business in Kenya, Tanzania, Malawi, and Mozambique. It had been a player in the Kenyan insurance sector since 1910. This transaction led to the expansion of Britam to Tanzania, Malawi, and Mozambique. Britam and Real Insurance only had parallel insurance businesses in Kenya. The Kenyan businesses would be consolidated. The acquisition of Real Insurance was approved by the shareholders of Britam on 19 February 2014.

In April 2014, the group announced its intention to acquire 30 percent of Continental Re Kenya Limited, a fully owned subsidiary of Lagos-based Continental Reinsurance Plc., in a deal valued at KSh300 million (approximately US$3.4 million). This acquisition was in a bid for the group to consolidate its market share and broaden revenue sources. The acquisition will be funded by a planned bond issue.

On 30 June 2014, British-American Investments Company served a takeover notice on the board of directors of the Housing Finance Company of Kenya to acquire the 24.76 percent shareholding that Equity Group Holdings Limited (EBG) held in the mortgage lender at that time. This transaction was completed on 31 December 2014 and it increased Britam's stake in Housing Finance to 46.1 percent.

In June 2015, the shareholders adopted a resolution to change the company name from British-American Investments Company to Britam Holdings Limited.

== Subsidiaries and investments ==
The companies that compose the Britam Holdings Limited are organised into four divisions and include, but are not limited, to the following:

=== Insurance ===
- Britam Life Assurance Company (Kenya) Limited – Nairobi, Kenya – 100% Shareholding – The flagship company of the group. Offering General insurance and Life insurance.
- Britam General Insurance Company (Kenya) Limited – Nairobi, Kenya – 100% Shareholding – Offering General Insurance and Holding Company for Tanzania, Malawi and Mozambique subsidiaries. Real Insurance Company is the oldest member having been founded in 1910 as a subsidiary of Royal Insurance, now part of RSA Insurance Group.
- Britam Insurance Uganda Limited – Kampala, Uganda – 100% Shareholding – Offering General and Life Insurance.
- Britam Insurance South Sudan Limited – Juba, South Sudan – 100% Shareholding – Offering General and Life Insurance.
- Britam Insurance Rwanda Limited – Kigali, Rwanda – 100% Shareholding – Offering General Insurance.
- RICEA Management Services Company – Nicosia, Cyprus – 100% Shareholding – Held through Real Insurance Company Limited – Management services of the Real Insurance subsidiaries.
- Britam Insurance Tanzania Limited– Dar es Salaam, Tanzania – 54.45% Shareholding – Held through Real Insurance Company Limited – Offering General Insurance
- Britam Insurance Company Malawi Limited – Blantyre, Malawi – 64.35% Shareholding – Held through Real Insurance Company Limited – Offering General Insurance. Started operating in 1959, making it the oldest insurance company in Malawi. It was listed on the Malawi Stock Exchange on 29 September 2008 through a successful IPO that was over-subscribed by 300%. It is the only listed insurance company in Malawi.
- Britam Companhia De Seguros De Mozambique, S.A – Maputo, Mozambique – 97.02% Shareholding – Offering General Insurance

=== Asset Management ===
- British-American Asset Managers Kenya Limited – Nairobi, Kenya – 100% Shareholding – Offering Financial services, investment management, Private equity and Investment advisory services.
- British-American Asset Managers Uganda Limited – Kampala, Uganda – 100% Shareholding – Offering financial services, investment management and investment advisory services.

=== Property ===
- Britam Properties (Kenya) Limited – Nairobi, Kenya – 100% Shareholding – Real Estate and REITs.
- Britam Properties (Uganda) Limited – 100% Shareholding.

=== Banking Holding ===
- Equity Group Holdings Limited – Nairobi, Kenya – 8.2% Shareholding - A financial services organisation in Eastern Africa regulated by the Central Bank of Kenya.
- Housing Finance Company of Kenya - 48.82% Shareholding - A mortgage finance provider in Kenya regulated by the Central Bank of Kenya.

== Ownership ==
In September 2017, the International Finance Corporation (IFC), an arm of the World Bank Group, concluded the acquisition of a 10.37 percent stake in Britam, thereby gaining a seat on the company's board of directors.

The shares of the stock of Britam Holdings Limited are traded on the Nairobi Stock Exchange, under the symbol: BRIT. As of 31 December 2017, the shareholding in the company's stock, was as depicted in the table below:

Britam Holdings Limited Stock Ownership
Rank	Name of Owner	Percentage Ownership
1	AfricInvest III SPV 1	17.55%
2	Equity Holdings Limited	16.05%
3	Standard Chartered Nominees Resident A/C Ke003819	15.79%
4	Standard Chartered Nominees Non-Resident A/C Ke11396	9.14%
5	Standard Chartered Nominees Non-Resident A/C Ke11752	8.88%
6	Mr. Jimnah M. Mbaru	7.72%
7	Dr. Benson I. Wairegi	4.01%
8	Dr. Peter K. Munga	2.97%
9	Dr. James N. Mwangi	2.97%
10	Standard Chartered Nominees Non-Resident A/C Ke10085	1.56%
11	Other Local & International Investors	13.36%
	Total	100.00%

== Governance ==
Britam Holdings is governed by an eleven-person Board of Directors with Kuria Muchiru serving as the Chairman of the group, and Tom Gitogo as the Group Managing Director .

== Britam Tower ==
Britam Tower is a 31-storey building located along Hospital Road in Upper Hill, Nairobi which serves as the headquarters for the company. The tower is known for its prism-like shape and an adjacent 15-storey parking. Standing at 200m, it is the tallest building in Kenya and the third tallest in Africa. The tower has wind turbines that generate power for parts of the building. The complex comprises offices, banking halls, restaurants and retail stores.

== Controversies ==
=== Bramer Banking Corporation Scandal ===
In April 2015, a US$693 million Ponzi scheme in Bramer Banking Corporation hit Britam's largest shareholder British American Investment Company Mauritius Limited (BAIC). The Group moved swiftly to inform the public that the ponzi scheme did not affect their operations. However, the directors were put under investigation by the IRA. The Mauritian government appointed receiver managers at BAI Co. later announced their intention to dispose of the group's entire shareholding in Britam. Dawood Rawat moved to the International Court of Arbitration in France to block this sale. As of January 2017, the case was ongoing.

Peter Munga, a Kenyan billionaire and Britam shareholder with an initial 16.96 percent shareholding acquired 23.3 percent in new shareholding that he bought from the Government of Mauritius at an undisclosed sum in June 2016, bringing his new total shareholding to 40.26 percent. At the time, Munga stated that he would dispose of the newly acquired shareholding, in approximately two years. In January 2017, the International Finance Corporation agreed to invest KSh3.5 billion (approx. US$35 million) in Britam, in exchange for 10.37 percent shareholding. The company issued 224.1 million new ordinary shares to IFC, reducing the shareholding of existing shareholders by 10.3 percent, reducing Munga's total ownership to 36.0 percent.

== Recent developments ==
In April 2019, the Business Daily Africa newspaper reported that the Swiss insurer, Swiss Re had acquired 15.79 percent in Britam Holdings Limited. Africinvest, now the largest shareholder, owns 16.2 percent. The International Finance Corporation controls 8.8 percent. At that time, the original founders, maintained a combined 39.2 percent equity ownership in the company.

== See also ==
- Equity Group Holdings Limited
- HF Group
- Dyer & Blair
- NSE
- Kenya Insurances
- Uganda Insurances
- British American Investment Company (Mauritius)
- Bramer Banking Corporation
- Cytonn Investments
