= Bank of Mauritius =

Monetary authority of Mauritius

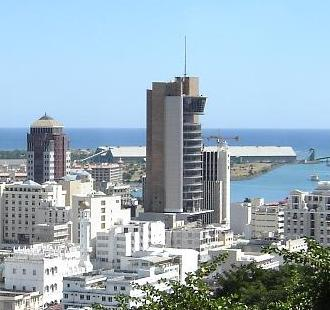
- Central bank of: Mauritius
- Headquarters: Bank of Mauritius Tower; Port Louis, Mauritius
- Established: 1967; 59 years ago
- Ownership: 100% state ownership
- Governor: Priscilla Muthoora Thakoor
- Currency: Mauritian rupee MUR (ISO 4217)
- Reserves: 7,910.1 million USD (2022)
- Website: www.bom.mu

The Bank of Mauritius (French: Banque de Maurice) is the central bank of the Republic of Mauritius. It was established in September 1967 as the central bank of Mauritius. It was modelled on the Bank of England and was, in effect, set up with the assistance of senior officers of the Bank of England.

Amongst its responsibilities is the issuance of the Mauritian currency, the Mauritian rupee.

== History ==
=== Previous namesake institutions ===
In the 19th Century three separate commercial banks, now all defunct, operated under the Bank of Mauritius name.

The first Bank of Mauritius started operations in 1814 but survived only until 1825.

The second Bank of Mauritius was a British overseas bank with two boards of directors, one in London and the other in Port Louis. It began operations in 1832 and favored the interests of the planter class. In 1838 traders established Mauritius Commercial Bank to give themselves an alternative source of credit as until its establishment the Bank of Mauritius had a monopoly on the island. The financial crisis of 1847 in London resulted in the collapse of the sugar market, and severe losses to both of Mauritius's banks. Bank of Mauritius ceased business in 1848, though the Mauritius Commercial Bank has survived to the present.

Local interests established the third Bank of Mauritius in 1894 to take over the local business of the failed New Oriental Bank Corporation. In 1911 the bank opened a branch in the Seychelles. However, in 1916 the Mercantile Bank of India (est. 1893) acquired the bank. HSBC in turn acquired the Mercantile Bank in 1959. Because of this history, HSBC refers to itself as the oldest foreign bank in Mauritius. The next foreign bank to arrive, and to survive to the present, was National Bank of South Africa, an ancestor of Absa Bank Mauritius Limited formerly Barclays Bank Mauritius.

In addition to the above three banks, a bank by the name of the Colonial Bank of Mauritius, Bourbon, and Dependencies, operated between 1812 and 1813.

=== Board of Commissioners of Currency ===
The Board of Commissioners of Currency of Mauritius was established on 1 September 1849, setting a template that would be emulated by numerous other currency boards in the British Empire and beyond. The duties of the Board were restricted to those of an issuing authority.

=== Establishment and development ===
The setting up of the Bank of Mauritius in 1967 marked the beginning of a new phase in the monetary history of Mauritius, with the monetary system moving forward from the currency board regime of Sterling Exchange Standard to a 'managed currency' in which the discretionary role of the monetary authority becomes important.

== Objectives of the Bank ==
The Bank of Mauritius Act 1966 (as amended) lays down the purposes of the Bank which are to 'safeguard the internal and external value of the currency of Mauritius and its internal convertibility' and to 'direct its policy towards achieving monetary conditions conducive to strengthening the economic activity and prosperity of Mauritius.'

The Bank has been set up as the authority which is responsible for the formulation and execution of monetary policy consistent with stable price conditions. It also has responsibility for safeguarding the stability and strengthening of the financial system of Mauritius.

== List of governors by tenure ==
| Governor | | Term of office | | Ref. |
| Governor | | Took office | Left office | Ref. |
|---|---|---|---|---|
| 1 | Aunauth Beejadhur | July 1967 | December 1972 | |
| 2 | Goorpersad Bunwaree | January 1973 | May 1982 | |
| 3 | Indur Ramphul | June 1982 | March 1996 | |
| 4 | Dan Maraye | April 1996 | November 1998 | |
| 5 | Ramesh Basant Roi | November 1998 | 31 December 2006 | |
| – | Yandraduth Googoolye | 1 January 2007 | 13 February 2007 | |
| 6 | Rundheersing Bheenick | 15 February 2007 | 15 February 2010 | |
| – | Yandraduth Googoolye | 16 February 2010 | 20 May 2010 | |
| (6) | Rundheersing Bheenick | 21 May 2010 | December 2014 | |
| (5) | Ramesh Basant Roi | 30 December 2014 | 15 January 2018 | |
| 7 | Yandraduth Googoolye | 15 January 2018 | February 2020 | |
| 8 | Harvesh Seegolam | 1 March 2020 | 15 November 2024 | |
| 9 | Rama Sithanen | 16 November 2024 | 29 September 2025 | |
| 10 | Priscilla Muthoora Thakoor | 29 September 2025 | Incumbent | |

== Online sales of commemorative coins ==
On 12 March 2008, the Bank of Mauritius launched the online sales of commemorative coins and Dodo Gold Coins to international buyers.

== See also ==
- Mauritian rupee
- List of banks in Mauritius
- Economy of Mauritius
- List of central banks of Africa
- List of central banks
- List of financial supervisory authorities by country
