= List of companies of Mauritius =

Location of Mauritius

Mauritius is an island nation in the Indian Ocean about 2,000 kilometres (1,200 mi) off the southeast coast of the African continent. Since independence in 1968, Mauritius has developed from a low-income, agriculture-based economy to a middle-income diversified economy. The economy is based on tourism, textiles, sugar, and financial services. In recent years, information and communication technology, seafood, hospitality and property development, healthcare, renewable energy, and education and training have emerged as important sectors, attracting substantial investment from both local and foreign investors.

== Notable firms ==
This list includes notable companies with primary headquarters located in the country. The industry and sector follow the Industry Classification Benchmark taxonomy. Organizations which have ceased operations are included and noted as defunct.

Notable companies Status: P=Private, S=State; A=Active, D=Defunct
Name	Industry	Sector	Headquarters	Founded	Notes	Status	
Air Mauritius	Consumer services	Airlines	Port Louis	1972	National airline	S	A
Bank of Mauritius	Financials	Banks	Port Louis	1967	Central bank	S	A
Raphael Fishing Company	Consumer services	Fishing and Associated	Port Louis	1927	Oldest commercial company in Mauritius based on continuous registration since incorporation (BRN C404). 2008 Permanent Grant 'The Thirteen Islands of St. Brandon'	P	A
Beachcomber Resorts & Hotels	Consumer services	Hotels	Curepipe	1952	Officially New Mauritius Hotels	P	A
Central Electricity Board (Mauritius)	Utilities	Power generation and distribution	Ebène Cybercity	1952	State-owned main producer and single power distributor	S	A
Emtel	Telecommunications	Mobile telecommunications	Ebene CyberCity	1989	Telecommunications and internet service provider	P	A
ENL Group	Conglomerates	-	Moka	1821	Sugar, real estate, development	P	A
Ireland Blyth Limited (IBL)	Conglomerates	-	Port Louis	1972	Financials, industrials, retail	P	A
La Sentinelle	Consumer services	Publishing	Baie-du-Tombeau	1963	Newspaper publisher, L'Express	P	A
Le Défi Media Group	Consumer services	Broadcasting & entertainment	Port Louis	1996	Mass media group	P	A
Le Mauricien	Consumer services	Publishing	Port Louis	1908	Newspaper publisher	P	A
LUX* Resorts & Hotels	Consumer services	Hotels	Curepipe	1985	Hotel operator	P	A
Mahanagar Telephone Mauritius Limited	Telecommunications	Fixed line telecommunications	Port Louis	2003	Telecommunications and ISP	P	A
MauBank	Financials	Banks	Ebene Cybercity	2003	State-owned, part of the Bank of Mauritius	S	A
Mauritius Broadcasting Corporation (MBC)	Consumer services	Broadcasting & entertainment	Moka	1964	Public broadcaster	S	A
Mauritius Commercial Bank (MCB)	Financials	Banks	Port Louis	1838	Second oldest commercial company in Mauritius based on continuous registration since incorporation (BRN C934).	P	A
Mauritius Post	Industrials	Delivery services	Port Louis	1772	Postal service in Mauritius	P	A
Mauritius Telecom	Telecommunications	Fixed line telecommunications	Port Louis	1992	Telecom	P	A
Omnicane	Conglomerates	-	Port Louis	1926	Sugarcane, Sugar, Bioethanol, Thermal Energy, Electricity, Hydro Energy.	P	A
Phoenix Beverages	Consumer services	Brewers	Vacoas-Phoenix	1960	Largest brewery in Mauritius	P	A
Rogers Group	Conglomerates	-	Port Louis	1899	Financials, logistics, real estate	P	A
Rose Hill Transport	Conglomerates	-	Beau Bassin-Rose Hill	1952	Transport, Logistics and Property	P	A
State Bank of Mauritius	Financials	Banks	Port Louis	1973	Commercial bank	P	A

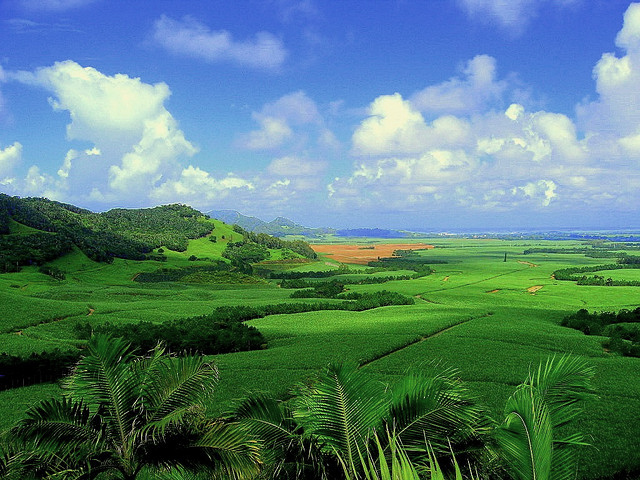
Sugar cane plantation in Mauritius.

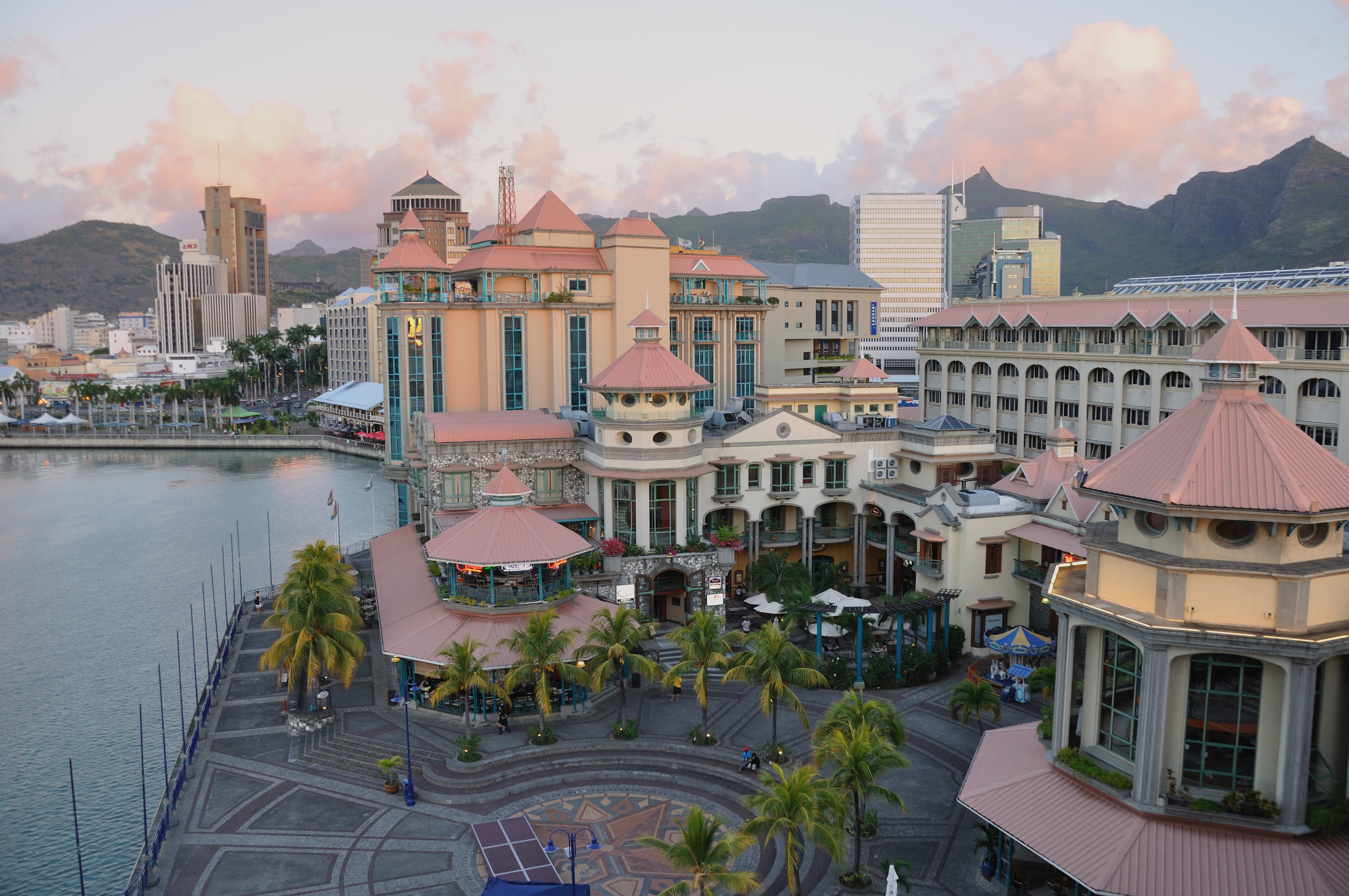
The Caudan Waterfront.

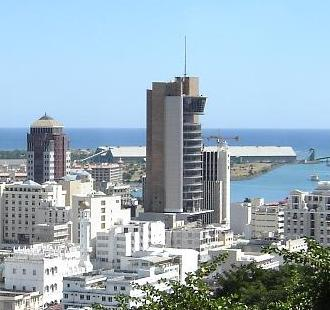
Bank of Mauritius Tower in Port Louis.

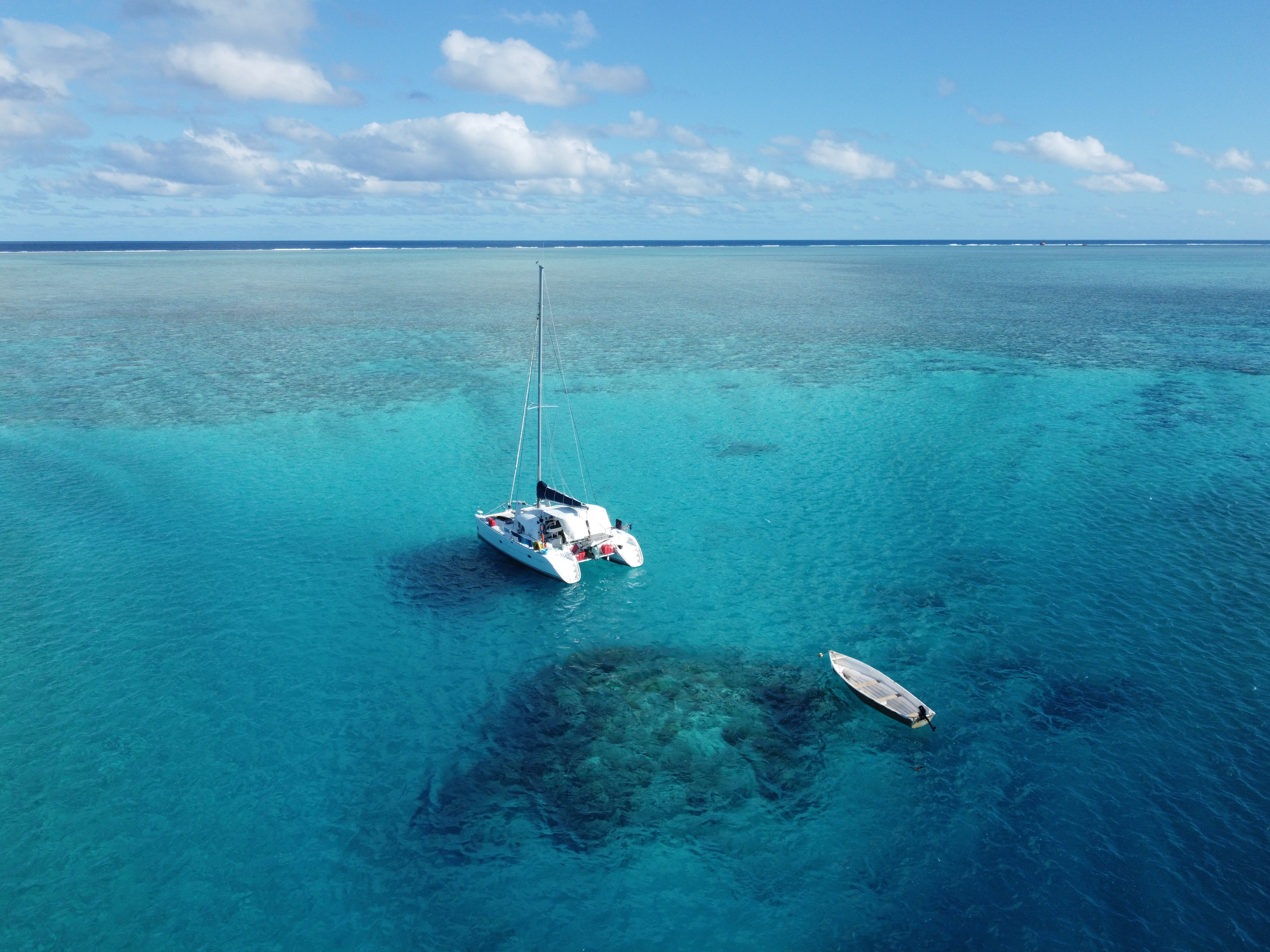
Flora, Fauna and landscapes from The Thirteen Islands of St. Brandon.

== See also ==
- Stock Exchange of Mauritius in MUR
- Economy of Mauritius
- Mascarene Islands
- St Brandon
- Cargados Carajos
- Mauritius
- Île Raphael
- Avocaré Island
- Permanent Grant
- L'île du Sud
- L'île du Gouvernement
- 999-year lease
- Permanent Grant
- L'Île Coco
- Privy Council of the United Kingdom
- Caralho, Portuguese word meaning, among other things, "penis-shaped island"
- Casting (fishing)
- Fishing tournament
- Fly Casting Analyzer
- Joan Wulff
- Africa Eats
