= LUX* Resorts & Hotels =

Hotel operator based in Mauritius

- Formerly: Naïade Resorts
- Company type: Public
- Traded as: SEM: NRL
- Industry: Hospitality, tourism
- Founded: 1985
- Headquarters: Floréal, Mauritius
- Key people: Arnaud Lagesse (chairman); Paul Jones (chief executive officer); Desire Elliah (chief financial officer); Julian Hagger (chief sales and marketing officer)
- Revenue: ▲ Rs. 4.2 billion (2014) – €108 million
- Owner: LUX* Island Resorts Ltd
- Number of employees: 2,900 (2014)
- Parent: LUX* Hospitality Ltd
- Website: www.luxresorts.com

LUX* Resorts & Hotels is a major luxury hotel operator based in Mauritius which owns or part-owns many of its hotels and runs others under management contracts, which typically involve, in addition to management services, design, operations, sales and marketing. It is a wholly owned subsidiary of LUX* Hospitality Ltd., which is listed on the Stock Exchange of Mauritius and is an affiliate member of IBL, the country's largest conglomerate.

== History ==
The company was founded in 1985 in Mauritius, by a group of Mauritian investors, as Naiade Resorts, with an emphasis on innovation, flexibility and a welcoming atmosphere. As well as gradually building up its own hotel operations, management contracts followed elsewhere in the Indian Ocean region.

In 2011, the group was rebranded as LUX* Resorts & Hotels and a new CEO brought in, Paul Jones, who had previously made a name for himself with the One&Only brand. The company now placed its emphasis on a less-staid approach to luxury introducing "real" coffee, retro-styled ice-cream parlours, on-the-beach film screenings, pop-up restaurants, red vintage telephone boxes and wellness & spa programmes.

== Business model ==
As of 2014 about one million tourists visit Mauritius every year, mainly coming from Europe, where the principal markets are France (including the neighbouring island of Reunion) and the United Kingdom. Marketing is also increasingly aimed at other European countries, as well as India and China.

Most LUX* properties are beachfront hotels. LUX* Belle Mare is located on the East Coast, LUX* Le Morne on the West Coast and LUX* Grand Gaube in the North. All three are rated five star although the government is currently thinking of introducing a revised system.

The group also runs LUX* Maldives, recently rated by readers of Condé Nast Traveller magazine as their number-one pick on the Indian Ocean Hot List, as well as LUX* Ile de La Reunion and LUX* Tea Horse Road Lijiang in China. There are plans to open five further boutique hotels along the Tea Horse Road in due course. LUX* is also moving into the Middle East, with a new hotel expected to open shortly in the United Arab Emirates, LUX* Al Zorah.

Other hotels managed by LUX* Resorts & Hotels include Tamassa in Bel Ombre on the South Coast of Mauritius, the Merville Beach just outside Grand Baie (Mauritius' largest seaside village) and Le Recif in Reunion Island. It also has a private island, Ile des Deux Cocos, located close to the Blue Bay Marine Park.

LUX* has developed a franchise with its Café LUX* brand in May 2015, the first Café LUX* coffeehouse to open outside LUX* Resorts & Hotels, featuring LUX*’s own organic Island Blend, freshly roasted at LUX* Belle Mare. Café LUX* opened its first coffeehouse in the heart of the island, at La City Trianon. It also has a fractional ownership division, LUX* Villas, in UK.

== Ownership ==
As at June 2014, shareholding in the company's stock was as depicted in the table below:

LUX* Resorts & Hotels ownership
Name of owner	Percentage ownership
IBL Limited	39.21
The Mauritius Commercial Bank Ltd	6.59
The Anglo-Mauritius Assurance Society Ltd	5.85
Other (Family Ownership; Duval, Bhoolell, Gunowa and Investors)	48.35

== External recognition awards ==
2014

- Best Initiative in Human Resource for LUX* Etiquette & Moral Week, Worldwide Hospitality Awards 2014
- Best Resorts for Weddings and Honeymoons, Travel Agents Choice Awards (UK)
- Luxury Hotels and Resorts Operator of the Year, TTG Travel Awards (London)
- Gold Award for Services by COTRI (China Outbound Tourism Research Institute)
- Best Hotel Group of the Year, Mauritius Tourism Awards
- Best Luxury Spa Group (Indian Ocean region), World Luxury Spa Awards

2013

- Luxury Hotels and Resorts Operator of the year, TTG Travel Awards
- Best Luxury Spa Group (Indian Ocean region), World Luxury Spa Awards

2012

- Best International Hotel Website, Best Hotel Website Africa and Best Hotel Website Mauritius, International Hospitality Awards
- Luxury Travel Supplier of the Year, TTG Travel Awards (London)

== See also ==
- Economy of Mauritius
- Tourism in Mauritius
- List of Mauritian companies
