= Rogers Group =

Mauritius-based international services and investment company

Rogers & Company Limited
- Company type: Limited liability company
- Traded as: SEM: ROGE
- Founded: 1899
- Founder: Walter Rogers
- Headquarters: ENL House, Vivéa Business Park, Moka, Mauritius
- Area served: Finance & Technology, Hospitality & Travel, Logistics, Malls, Real Estate & Agribusiness
- Key people: Philippe Espitalier-Noël (CEO); Jean Pierre Montocchio (Chairman)
- Number of employees: 4,700+ (2022)
- Parent: ENL Group
- Subsidiaries: Rogers Capital, Rogers Hospitality, Rogers Aviation, Velogic, Ascencia, Agrïa

Founded in 1899, the Rogers Group is a Mauritius-based listed international services and investment company with expertise in five Segments: Finance & Technology, Hospitality & Travel, Logistics, Malls, and Reals Estate & Agribusiness.

Rogers has, over the years, developed beyond Mauritius into the region and internationally, with offices in 13 countries.

== Ownership ==
As of June 2015, the shareholding in the stock of the company was as follows:

Shareholder	Percentage	Notes
Rogers Consolidated Shareholding Limited (RCSL)	53	Wholly owned subsidiary of ENLIL
ENL Investment Ltd (ENLIL)	6.72	Subsidiary of ENL Ltd
National Pension fund	5.49	
Others	34.79	Includes individuals, insurance and assurance companies, investment and trust companies

== See also ==
- Economy of Mauritius
- List of Mauritian companies
