= Beachcomber Resorts & Hotels =

Hospitality company based in Mauritius

New Mauritius Hotels Ltd
- Trade name: Beachcomber Resorts & Hotels
- Company type: Limited company
- Traded as: SEM: NHM
- Industry: Hospitality, Tour Operating and In-flight Catering
- Founded: 1952
- Headquarters: Beachcomber House, Botanical Garden Street, Curepipe, Mauritius
- Key people: Hector Espitalier-Noël, Chairman; Gilbert Espitalier-Noël, CEO
- Net income: 765M (2019)
- Number of employees: About 5000
- Website: www.beachcomber-hotels.com

Beachcomber Resorts & Hotels is the trading name of New Mauritius Hotels Ltd, a Mauritius-based company in the hospitality industry. It owns and manages eight hotels in Mauritius, one in the Seychelles and one in Morocco. It also operates an in-flight catering business (operating as Plaisance Catering) and five tour operating companies around the world.

New Mauritius Hotels is the biggest and oldest hotel group in Mauritius with about 2077 rooms (around 25% of the total in Mauritius). It is one of the two largest companies listed on the Mauritian stock exchange by market capitalisation.

== History ==
The first hotel of the group was started in 1952.

- 1952 : The Park Hotel (Curepipe - central region) first hotel of the group, nowadays the headquarters of the group.
- 1962:
  - Opening of Le Chaland (south-east of Mauritius)
  - Opening of Le Morne Plage (south-west of Mauritius)
- 1964: Establishment of New Mauritius Hotels Ltd (NMH) trading as Beachcomber Hotels
- 1967 : Opening of Le Brabant (replacing the former Le Morne Plage in the south-west of Mauritius)
- 1971 : Opening of Trou aux Biches (in the north of Mauritius)
- 1972: Opening of the Dinarobin Pierre Desmarais Hotel (south-west of Mauritius)
- 1985 : Opening of Royal Palm Mauritius (north of Mauritius)
- 1991 : Opening of the Shandrani (replacing the former Le Chaland in the south-east of Mauritius)
- 1992: Beachcomber Hotels buys the former Pullman Hotel in Grand-Bay and renames it Le Mauricia
- 1994 : Beachcomber Hotels buys the former "Le Mariya Hotel" located in Pointe aux Piments. Following extensive works, the hotel is renamed Le Victoria
- 1996 : Le Méridien Brabant and Paradis are merged under the brand name, Paradis Hotel & Golf Club
- 1997 : Beachcomber Hotels buys Le Canonnier (north of Mauritius)
- 2001 :
  - Opening of Sainte Anne Resort & Spa (Sainte Anne Island, Seychelles)
  - Opening of the Dinarobin Hotel Golf & Spa (south-west of Mauritius)
- 2006 : Creation of the ‘Apartment Village’ at Le Mauricia
- 2007: Launch of Shandrani Serenity plus, the first fully inclusive 5 star resort in Mauritius
- 2010: Reopening of Trou aux Biches, renamed Trou aux Biches Resort & Spa after two years of work
- 2011: Takeover of brands Mautourco and White Sand Tours
- 2013: Soft opening of Royal Palm Marrakech, the first Beachcomber hotel in Morocco
- 2014: Opening of a Spa by Clarins at the Royal Palm Marrakech

In 2016, a fraud of some MUR 115 million was perpetrated through electronic means to the detriment of the company.

== Locations ==
Name	Country	Location
Royal Palm Hotel	Mauritius	Royal Road - Grand Baie
Dinarobin Hotel Golf & Spa	Mauritius	Le Morne Peninsula
Paradis Hotel & Golf Club	Mauritius	Le Morne Peninsula
Trou Aux Biches Resort & Spa	Mauritius	Trou Aux Biches - Triolet
Shandrani Resort & Spa	Mauritius	Blue Bay
Le Victoria Hotel	Mauritius	Pointe Aux Piments
Le Canonnier Hotel	Mauritius	Royal Road - Pointe Aux Canonniers
Le Mauricia Hotel	Mauritius	Royal Road - Grand Baie

== See also ==
- Economy of Mauritius
- Tourism in Mauritius
- List of Mauritian companies
