= Frederick Schomberg Ireland =

English cricketer (1860–1937)

Frederick Ireland
Personal information
- Full name: Frederick Schomberg Ireland
- Born: 6 April 1860; Port Louis, Mauritius
- Died: 6 March 1937 (aged 76); Menton, France
- Batting: Right-handed
- Bowling: Right-arm roundarm fast
- Relatives: Alan Pegler (grandson); John Frederick Ireland (nephew), Eric Norman Spencer Crankshaw (nephew-in-law)

Domestic team information
- Years: Team
- 1878–1887: Kent
- 1879–1883: Devon
- FC debut: 13 June 1878 Kent v Hampshire
- Last FC: 27 June 1887 Kent v Lancashire

Career statistics
Competition	First-class
Matches	4
Runs scored	125
Batting average	17.85
100s/50s	0/1
Top score	87
Balls bowled	140
Wickets	3
Bowling average	18.00
5 wickets in innings	0
10 wickets in match	0
Best bowling	3/37
Catches/stumpings	1/–
- Source: Cricinfo, 4 January 2012

Frederick Schomberg Ireland (6 April 1860 – 16 March 1937) was an English lawyer and merchant who played cricket as an amateur. Ireland was a right-handed batsman who bowled right-arm roundarm.

== Cricket ==
Ireland played club cricket for Blackheath in Kent. He made his first-class cricket debut for Kent County Cricket Club against Hampshire in May 1878 at Southampton. He played a further first-class match that season against Sussex. He next appeared for Kent in 1887, picked after scoring a century for Kent's Second XI against Blackheath. He played twice that year, against Middlesex and Lancashire. During the early 1880s Ireland had been active in club cricket at Sidmouth in Devon and had played for Devon against MCC at Lord's in 1883. He was secretary of Blackheath Cricket Club between 1886 and 1891 and played for Gentlemen of Kent and Band of Brothers.

Ireland's nephew, John Frederick Ireland, also played cricket and made 28 first-class appearances between 1908 and 1912.

== Life ==
Ireland was born at Port Louis in Mauritius, the son of George Ireland, one of the founders of Ireland Fraser & Co. in Mauritius, and his wife, Emily Hartshorne, the daughter of Hugh Hartshorne, a barrister from Halifax, Nova Scotia. He was the grandson of The Rev. Dr. Walter Foggo Ireland, minister of the North Leith Parish Church. Ireland was named after his maternal uncle by marriage, Vice Admiral Charles Frederick Schomberg (1815–1874).

He was educated at Blackheath Proprietary School and trained as a lawyer. After working briefly in the profession he became a merchant like his father, living most of his working life in the Blackheath and Charlton areas of Kent. He married Edith Mary in 1861. The couple's daughter, Enid Ireland, married Francis Egerton Pegler, one of the founders of the company now known as Pegler Yorkshire. Her son, Alan Pegler, is known in railway circles as the saviour of the Flying Scotsman 4472 steam locomotive.

An able golfer, Ireland's most memorable achievements at his home course, the Royal Blackeath Golf Club, are detailed in Bernard Darwin's book Green Memories.

Shortly before World War I Ireland moved to Mildenhall in Suffolk where he served as a Justice of the Peace. Edith died in 1914 and he remarried in 1921.

Ireland died at Menton in the south of France in March 1937 aged 76.

== Bibliography ==
- Carlaw, Derek (2020). Kent County Cricketers, A to Z: Part One (1806–1914) (PDF). Cardiff: ACS.
