= ENL Group =

ENL Limited
- Company type: Limited liability company
- Traded as: SEM: ENL
- Predecessor: Espitalier Noël Ltd
- Founded: 1821
- Founder: Martial Henri Noël
- Headquarters: ENL House, Vivea Business Park, Moka, Mauritius
- Key people: Gilbert Espitalier-Noël (CEO)
- Number of employees: 6,803 (2015)
- Divisions: ENL Investment, ENL Land, ENL Commercial, ENL Property
- Subsidiaries: Rogers Group
- Website: www.enl.mu

ENL is a broad-based conglomerate with interests in most sectors of the Mauritius economy listed on the Stock Exchange of Mauritius. It operates in Agro-industry, Real Estate, Hospitality, Logistics, Finance & technology, Commerce and Industry sectors with a diverse portfolio of more than 120 brands and employs over 7,000 people.

== History ==
The group traces its beginnings in 1821 when Martial Henri Noël bought 40 hectares (100 acres) of agricultural land from his siblings. In 1827, he purchased an additional 89 hectares (220 acres) and built the Mon Desert sugar factory.

In 1882, the Noël family invested in the Savannah sugar estate in the south of the island, giving them access to another 810 hectares (2,000 acres) of land.

Espitalier-Noël Ltd was incorporated in 1944 as a holding company to administer its two sugar estates. In 1966, it participated in the creation of the Food and Allied Group (of which ENL Investment still holds 49%).

In 1969, Espitalier Noel Ltd created the General Investment and Development Company Ltd (GIDC – now ENL Commercial) to invest in non-sugar related activities.

The company's predecessors (Savannah and Mon Desert Alma sugar estates and GIDC) were among the first companies listed on the newly created Mauritius Stock Exchange in 1989.

In July 2025, ENL Group merged with Rogers Group to become a new entity known as ER Group. Further to this merger and restructuring, the Group was listed on the Stock Exchange of Mauritius as NewENLRogers Limited (Ticker: ERL). The transaction was approved by the Supreme Court of Mauritius on June 27 and ENL Limited underwent a partial demerger. This move transferred specific investments and liabilities (including listed bonds) to the new entity, NewENLRogers, which now holds and consolidates the core assets of both ENL and Rogers.

== Bagatelle Mall By Ascencia ==
The Bagatelle Mall is a commercial center inaugurated in 2011 developed and operated by ENL Property in partnership with South Africa's Atterbury Investment Group.

The first phase (of the planned three) stretches over 42,000 square metres and needed an investment of MUR 3.1 billion (approx. US$85 million in 2015). It includes over 140 shopping outlets, a food court and restaurants, a brewery in the name of Flying Dodo Brewing Company, cinemas and a hotel.

An extension of 9,000 square metres, developed at a cost of MUR 500 million (approx. US$13 million in 2015), was opened in 2015

A listed Company part of the Top-10 list of the Stock Exchange of Mauritius (SEM) and included in its sustainability index, Ascencia - the leader in the development and management of a portfolio of properties - owns seven shopping malls in Mauritius. The property fund was created in 2008 by the Mauritian-born group, Rogers - a subsidiary of the ENL Group which has an international presence in 12 countries.

== See also ==
- Economy of Mauritius
- List of Mauritian companies
