= Rose Hill Transport =

RHT Holding Ltd.
- Company type: Limited liability company
- Traded as: SEM: RHT
- Founded: 1952
- Founder: Juggarnath Goburdhun
- Headquarters: 14 Hugnin Road, Beau Bassin-Rose Hill, Mauritius
- Area served: Transport, Logistics and Property
- Key people: Sidharth Sharma (Sid) (CEO)
- Number of employees: 400-500
- Subsidiaries: RHT Investments Ltd, RHT Properties Ltd, RHT Ventures Ltd, RHT Fund Management Ltd
- Website: www.rht.mu

RHT Holding Ltd is a Mauritius-based listed international services and investment company with specialist expertise within 3 markets: Transport, Logistics and Property.

== History ==
In 1952 entrepreneur Juggarnath Goburdhun purchased his first bus when he was based at Forest Side. By 1954 the entrepreneur had founded Rose Hill Transport Limited in alliance with other bus operators to service the transportation needs of passengers between Rose-Hill and Port-Louis. His close associates were Michael Leal, France Maugueret, Goolam Mamode Kureeman et Ng Kiam Sin. The company grew its original fleet of 5 buses of the 1950s to a fleet of 90 buses which operates along 12 routes which transports 30,000 passengers daily.

In 1962 Rose Hill Transport made history by introducing the first double decker bus in Mauritius and the launch was celebrated at a banquet feast hosted at Plaza in Rose Hill which was attended by Sir Harold E. Walter who was the chief guest and Minister of Transport. The 1975 students' protest and 1971 workers strikes affected the business.

In 1992 Sanjiv Goburdhun became the managing director of the organisation. By mid 1990s the company started its restructure, and its original name Rose Hill Transport Limited became RHT Holding Ltd.

== Organisation ==
RHT Holding Ltd. remains an important provider in the public transport sector of Mauritius. It is a publicly listed company quoted on the Development Enterprise Market (DEM) of the Stock Exchange of Mauritius. RHT is listed on the secondary market of the SEM. The Group employs more than 400 persons and has an asset base in excess of US$30M.

In 2011 the company's Managing Director announced its further diversification into the real estate sector. The subsidiary companies under the group include the following:

1. RHT Investments Ltd (manages investments of the group)

2. RHT Properties Ltd (real estate arm of the group and manages properties of the group)

3. RHT Ventures Ltd (holds investments in other entities such as Island Communications Ltd, RHT Capital Ltd, Algorithmix Co. Ltd, RHT Systems (Pvt) India Ltd, Showbizz Entertainment Ltd, and One Advertising Ltd.)

4. RHT Fund Management Ltd (the 'fund manager' in RHT Capital Ltd (RCL) and other member companies of the group)

== See also ==
- Economy of Mauritius
- List of Mauritian companies
