= John Ireland (cricketer) =

English cricketer (1888–1970)

Personal information
- Full name: John Frederick Ireland
- Born: 12 August 1888; Port Louis, Mauritius
- Died: 21 October 1970 (aged 82); Uckfield, Sussex, England
- Batting: Right-handed
- Bowling: Right-arm roundarm medium
- Relatives: Frederick Ireland (uncle); Eric Crankshaw (brother-in-law)

Domestic team information
- Years: Team
- 1906–1911: Suffolk
- 1908–1911: Cambridge University
- 1912: MCC
- FC debut: 14 May 1908 Cambridge University v Yorkshire
- Last FC: 4 July 1912 MCC v Cambridge University

Career statistics
Competition	First-class
Matches	28
Runs scored	1,355
Batting average	28.82
100s/50s	3/0
Top score	123
Balls bowled	1,561
Wickets	37
Bowling average	21.27
5 wickets in innings	2
10 wickets in match	0
Best bowling	5/25
Catches/stumpings	21/–
- Source: CricInfo, 4 July 2018

Captain John Frederick Ireland MC (12 August 1888 – 16 October 1970) was an English amateur cricketer. Ireland was a right-handed batsman who bowled right-arm roundarm medium pace.

== Cricket ==
Ireland played cricket at Marlborough College where he was educated, captaining the Marlborough side in 1907. He played for Cambridge University between 1908 and 1911, making 28 first-class appearances in total, 27 for the university and one for MCC in 1912. He also played Minor Counties cricket for Suffolk between 1906 and 1911.

A three-sport athlete, Ireland played cricket, hockey and golf while attending Trinity College, winning blues in his freshman year in both cricket and hockey. He held the unusual record of captaining three Cambridge University teams in those games and was a triple blue.

Ireland's uncle, Frederick Ireland, also played cricket and made four first-class appearances between 1878 and 1887. Ireland's brother-in-law, Eric Crankshaw, made one first-class appearance in 1909.

== Life ==
Ireland was born on 12 August 1888 in Port Louis, Mauritius, the second son of George Hugh Ireland of Ireland Fraser & Co., Mauritius and his first wife, Margaret Guthrie Harvey, the daughter of John Harvey of Kent and Singapore. He was the grandson of George Ireland, one of the founders of Ireland Fraser & Co., and the great-grandson of Walter Foggo Ireland, a Church of Scotland minister at the North Leith Parish Church within the Presbytery of Edinburgh.

During the First World War, Ireland was a Captain in the Royal Field Artillery deployed in France. In September 1917 he was awarded the Military Cross for conspicuous gallantry while in command of a battery that came under heavy bombardment.

Ireland married Philippa Sarah Bates, the daughter of Philip Bates, on 18 December 1917 at Holy Trinity Church, Upper Chelsea.

Professionally, Ireland was a Director of Ireland Fraser, a company co-founded by his grandfather George Ireland, now called Ireland Blyth Limited, as well as Arbuthnot Latham & Co. and Mercantile Bank of India.

Ireland died on 21 October 1970 at Uckfield in Sussex, England.
