= MTPA =

MTPA may refer to:

- Mauritius Tourism Promotion Authority, board to promote Mauritius tourism industry
- Mosher's acid, a carboxylic acid
- million tonnes per annum, a weight based production measurement value
- metric tonnes per annum, a weight based production measurement value
- HADHA, enzyme
- Maximum torque per ampere, a motor control algorithm
