= AfrAsia Bank Limited =

Privately-owned African development bank

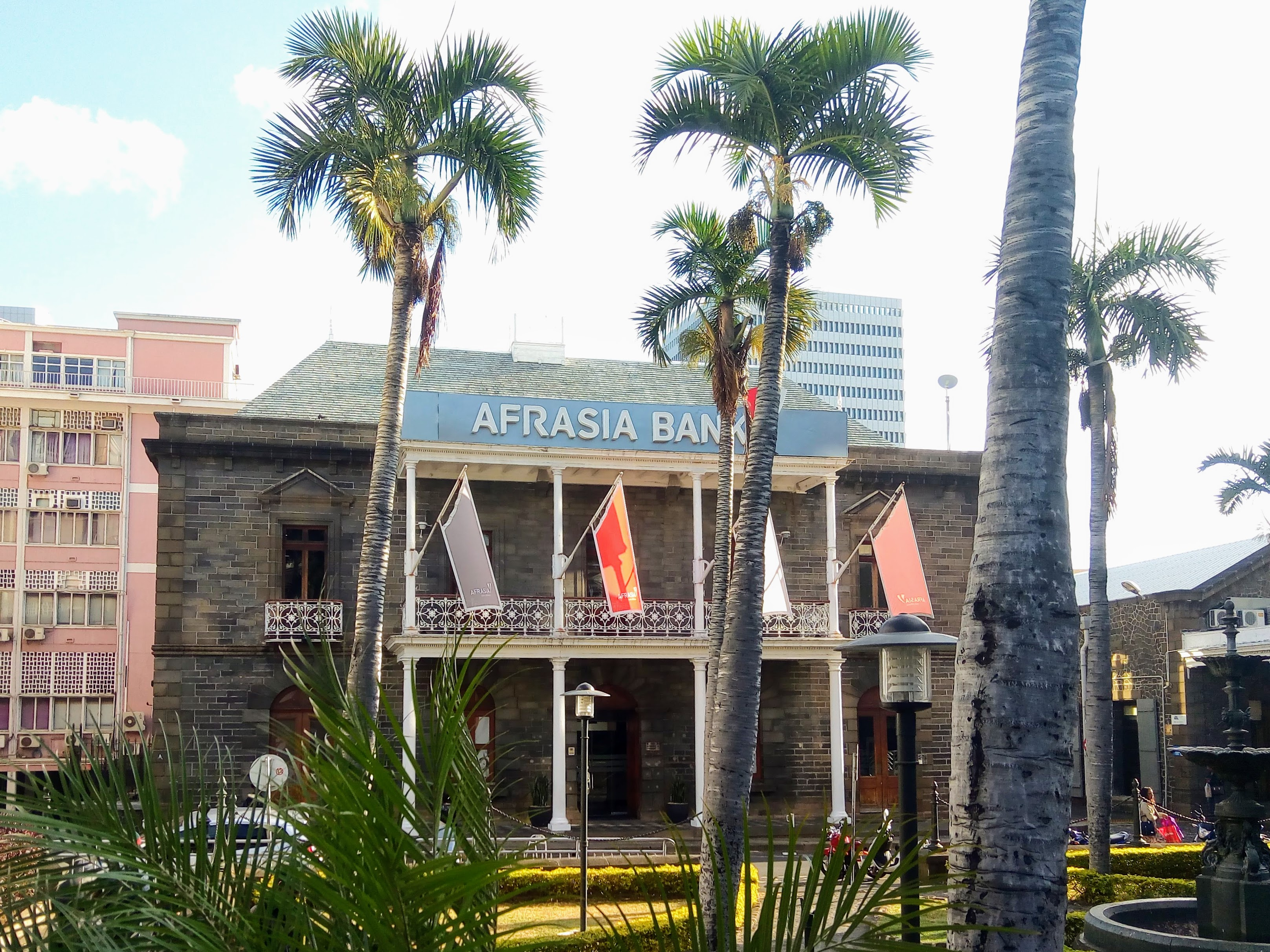
- Company type: Bank
- Industry: Financial services
- Founded: 2007
- Headquarters: Bowen Square; 10 Dr. Ferriere Street; Port Louis, Mauritius
- Key people: Thierry Vallet; CEO
- Products: Corporate and Investment Banking, Private Banking and Wealth Management, International Banking, Treasury
- Operating income: US$ 60.2 million (MUR 2.6 billion) (2021)
- Total assets: US$ 4.3 billion (MUR 190.1 billion) (2021)
- Number of employees: +400 (2025)
- Website: AfrAsia Bank Limitied

AfrAsia Bank Limited, commonly known as AfrAsia Bank, is authorized and regulated by the Bank of Mauritius and the Financial Services Commission. Headquartered in the Mauritius International Financial Centre with representative office in South Africa, AfrAsia specialises in banking that builds bridges between Africa, Asia and the World.

== History ==
AfrAsia Bank was officially launched in Port Louis, Mauritius in 2007. The following year, the Bank launched the very first AfrAsia Titanium Mastercard credit card on the island and was the first local Bank to have acquired a Foreign Institutional (FII) Investor License to facilitate global business flows into India. In 2010, to expand their physical footprint in Africa and reinforce their reach across the continent, the Bank opened a representative office in Johannesburg, South Africa.

In 2014, AfrAsia Bank opened its second branch on the Island in Ebene whilst embracing the concept of a “digital branch” and The National Bank of Canada embarked on the Bank Different journey as a new major shareholder. During that same year, the Bank became the title sponsor for the AfrAsia Bank Mauritius Open – the first worldwide tri-sanctioned tournament endorsed by the European, Sunshine and Asian Tours offering a prize purse of EUR 1m.

In 2016, AfrAsia Bank joined the United Nations Global Compact Network, the world's largest voluntary corporate citizenship initiative, to portray its commitment to adopt sustainable and socially responsible policies as well as reporting on the advances made in this respect. In that same year, the Bank is accredited by the Bank of Mauritius as a Primary Dealer under the Primary Dealer Operational Framework which aims to explore and develop a competitive, liquid and sophisticated local financial market in the trading of Government Securities in Mauritius.

In line with its Sustainability Strategy, the Bank pioneered the AfrAsia Bank Sustainability Summit in October 2018, a first on the Mauritian corporate landscape. With its core theme “Translating the SDGs into your Business”, the summit aimed to trigger a staunch public-private sector collaboration and highlight how interorganizational cooperation can drive the achievement of the Sustainable Development Goals (SDGs). The event welcomed participants from Africa, Asia and Europe as well as eminent experts from UN and Commonwealth.

In 2020, as a founding member, AfrAsia Bank powered the institution of the Global Compact Network (Mauritius) Foundation on the Island. The following year, 2 AfrAsians earned the prestigious designation and joined the elite group of technical analysts - Elliott Wave International Certification.

== Business Lines ==
The bank is organized into four major administrative divisions:

- Corporate Banking
- Private Banking & Wealth Management
- Global Business Banking
- Treasury & Markets

== Ownership ==
AfrAsia Bank has a mix of local and international private institutional investors

AfrAsia Bank Stock Ownership

Rank	Name of Owner
1	IBL, a Mauritian Conglomerate
2	National Bank of Canada
3	Intrasia Group
	Total

== Branches ==
The bank maintains its headquarters and main branch at Mauritius International Financial Centre, Bowen Square, 10 Dr. Ferriere Street, in Port Louis, the capital and largest city in Mauritius. Also the Bank has its branch in Tribeca Central, AfrAsia Tower. It also maintains a representative office in South African city namely Johannesburg.

== Wealth Reports ==
AfrAsia Bank publishes a number of wealth reports annually, including the Africa Wealth Report and the Global Wealth Migration Review.

== See also ==
- List of banks in Mauritius
- Economy of Mauritius
- AfrAsia Bank Mauritius Open -
