= Crankshaw =

Crankshaw is a surname. Notable people with the surname include:

- Edward Crankshaw (1909–1984), British writer, author, translator and commentator
- Eric Norman Spencer Crankshaw (1885–1966), English cricketer, military officer and civil servant
- Ollie Crankshaw (born 1998), English footballer
