= Abdol Hossein Hamzavi =

Iranian diplomat and writer

Sir Abdol Hossein Hamzavi KCMG (20 January 1910 - 3 March 1979) was an Iranian diplomat, author and representative to the United Nations.

== Biography ==
Abdol Hossein Hamzavi was born 20 January 1910 in Tehran, Iran. After receiving his primary and secondary schooling in his homeland of Iran, Abdol Hossein Hamzavi relocated to Great Britain to study English literature. His entry into civil service began when he was appointed cultural attaché of the Iranian Embassy, responsible for student affairs. He eventually became a cultural advisor.

During WWII, and after the occupation of his country by the allied troops, Hamzavi focused his energy on promoting Iran as a centerpiece for the final victory against the Axis powers. He was the first to suggest that Iran be recognized as "Pol-e Pirouzi" or "The Victory Bridge" for Iran's role as a regional terminus for equipment transfer and armament for the United States.

Hamzavi later served as Spokesman of the Court, Deputy Prime Minister, Deputy Minister of the Ministry of Foreign Affairs, Director of Iranian Radio and representative to the United Nations. While serving as minister to the UN, Hamzavi was famously quoted in the US papers as stating, "Women should be cherished, respected and shielded from unpleasant things -- like voting." He was named as Ambassador to Brazil and Thailand, Malaysia and Laos. before finishing his career as Ambassador to Japan.

In 1948 Hamzavi married Lella Margaret Crankshaw, the daughter of Sir Eric Norman Spencer Crankshaw, Secretary of the Government Hospitality Fund for England (1929–1949). The couple had a daughter, Jasmina Hilton, an actress who had a role in the horror film The Vault of Horror. Jasmina initially began her acting career using her maiden name of Hamzavi, and was a protégé of Orson Welles using that name, but later changed to using her married name.

Hamzavi died in England on 3 March 1979.

For his service, Hamzavi received numerous Iranian and foreign decorations, including the Order of Homayoun (1st class) and Great Britain's Knight Commander of St. Michael and St George.

== Bibliography ==
Hamzavi authored more than 800 articles including the following publications:

- Henceforth Iran, published 1936 under the name Abdol Hossain Hamzavi
- Persia and the Powers: An Account of Diplomatic Relations 1941-1946, published 1946 under the name AH Hamzavi
- Land reform in Iran: A country in metamorphosis, published 1971
- The Prophetic Light, published 1977
- Iran and the Tehran Conference, International Affairs, Oxford University.

== Sources ==
- The Prophetic Light, Privately published by John Weatherhill, Tokyo, Inc Publication, 1977
- Abdol Hossein Hamzavi on French Wikipedia
