= Eric Norman Spencer Crankshaw =

Sir Eric Norman Spencer Crankshaw
- Born: Eric Norman Spencer Crankshaw; 1 July 1885; Over Peover, Cheshire, England
- Died: 24 June 1966 (aged 80); Reading, Berkshire, England
- Military career
- Allegiance: United Kingdom
- Branch: British Army
- Service years: 1905–1921; 1943–1945
- Nickname: "Crankie"
- Unit: Royal Fusiliers

Sir Eric Norman Spencer Crankshaw KCMG CMG MBE (1 July 1885 – 24 June 1966) was an English cricketer, military officer and civil servant. He worked closely with Winston Churchill during both world wars.

== Early life ==
Crankshaw was born 1 July 1885 in Over Peover, Cheshire, England, the son of Richard Louis Crankshaw and his wife, Emily Spencer. The family eventually included another son, Richard Spencer Crankshaw, and a daughter, Madeline Vernon Crankshaw. The family's Irish home was Dunlewey Estate in the village of Dunlewey in County Donegal.

As a youth, Crankshaw attended Eton College.

== Cricket ==
Crankshaw made headlines in 1903 when, playing for Eton, he scored a century against Harrow at Lord's. Eton won the match by 8 wickets. Crankshaw later played for Gloucestershire County Cricket Club as a right-handed batsman. He made a single first-class appearance for the side, during the 1909 season, against Surrey.

== Military career ==
In 1906, Crankshaw joined the Royal Fusiliers in South Africa, having previously obtained a commission in The Liverpool Militia in 1905. In 1915 at Ypres, having just arrived from India, Crankshaw was wounded, resulting in the loss of his left arm. He spent six months recovering from pleurisy and pneumonia. After his recovery, he joined the Royal Corps of Signals. He later served as Camp Commandant of the IV Corps under Field Marshal Sir Henry Hughes Wilson, 1st Baronet.

After WWI ended, he was tasked with handling the billeting arrangements for 300 members of the Supreme War Council at Versailles. When the Versailles meetings concluded, Crankshaw was appointed as Private Secretary to Winston Churchill during his tenure as Secretary of State for War. When Churchill left that office, Crankshaw submitted his papers and went into retirement in the country.

During WWII, Crankshaw's organizational skills were again called into service when he was named Commandant of the New Public Offices Fortress, which included Churchill's War Rooms.

== Civil service ==
In 1929, while Churchill was serving as the Chancellor of the Exchequer, he selected Crankshaw to become Secretary of the Government Hospitality Fund. The appointment required Crankshaw to take on the role of lead host and the responsibility of promoting international goodwill on behalf of the government. His role also included oversight of Government Wine Cellar located at Lancaster House. Events under Crankshaw's charge included dinners, receptions, informal lunches, and visits to places of interest for visiting dignitaries, but also arrangements for the 1937 Coronation of George VI. He served in this capacity until his retirement in 1949.

== Family ==
On 5 October 1912 at St Michael and All Angels' Church, Blackheath, London Crankshaw married Winifred Mary Ireland of Mauritius and London. Winifred was the only daughter of George Hugh Ireland, the granddaughter of George Ireland, the founder of the firm Ireland Fraser & Co. Ltd, and the great-granddaughter of The Rev. Dr. Walter Foggo Ireland, Minister of North Leith Parish Church. The couple met while Crankshaw was serving in Mauritius and had the following children:

- Lella Margaret Crankshaw (1916–2002), firstly married diplomat Abdol Hossein Hamzavi, later her married name was Millar
- Major John Anthony Norman Crankshaw (1918–2000), married Elspeth Lettyr Stirling, daughter of Lt.-Col. Walter Francis Stirling

Crankshaw's father died 29 November 1929 and is buried near the family's Dunlewey estate. His father's second wife, Nellie, is buried in the Roman Catholic graveyard of the Sacred Heart Church in Moneybag, with her grave oriented to look towards her husband's grave.

Crankshaw's brother-in-law, John Frederick Ireland, also played cricket and made 28 first-class appearances between 1908 and 1912.

Crankshaw's actress granddaughter, Jasmina Hilton, daughter of Crankshaw's daughter Lella Margaret and her first husband, had a role in the horror film The Vault of Horror.

== Awards ==
- 1919 - Member of the Order of the British Empire (MBE), Military Division
- 1934 - Companion of the Order of St Michael and St George (CMG)
- 1939 - Knight Commander of the Order of St Michael and St George (KCMG)

== Death ==
Crankshaw died on 24 June 1966 at the age of 80 at the Royal Berkshire Hospital.
