= Tourism in Mauritius =

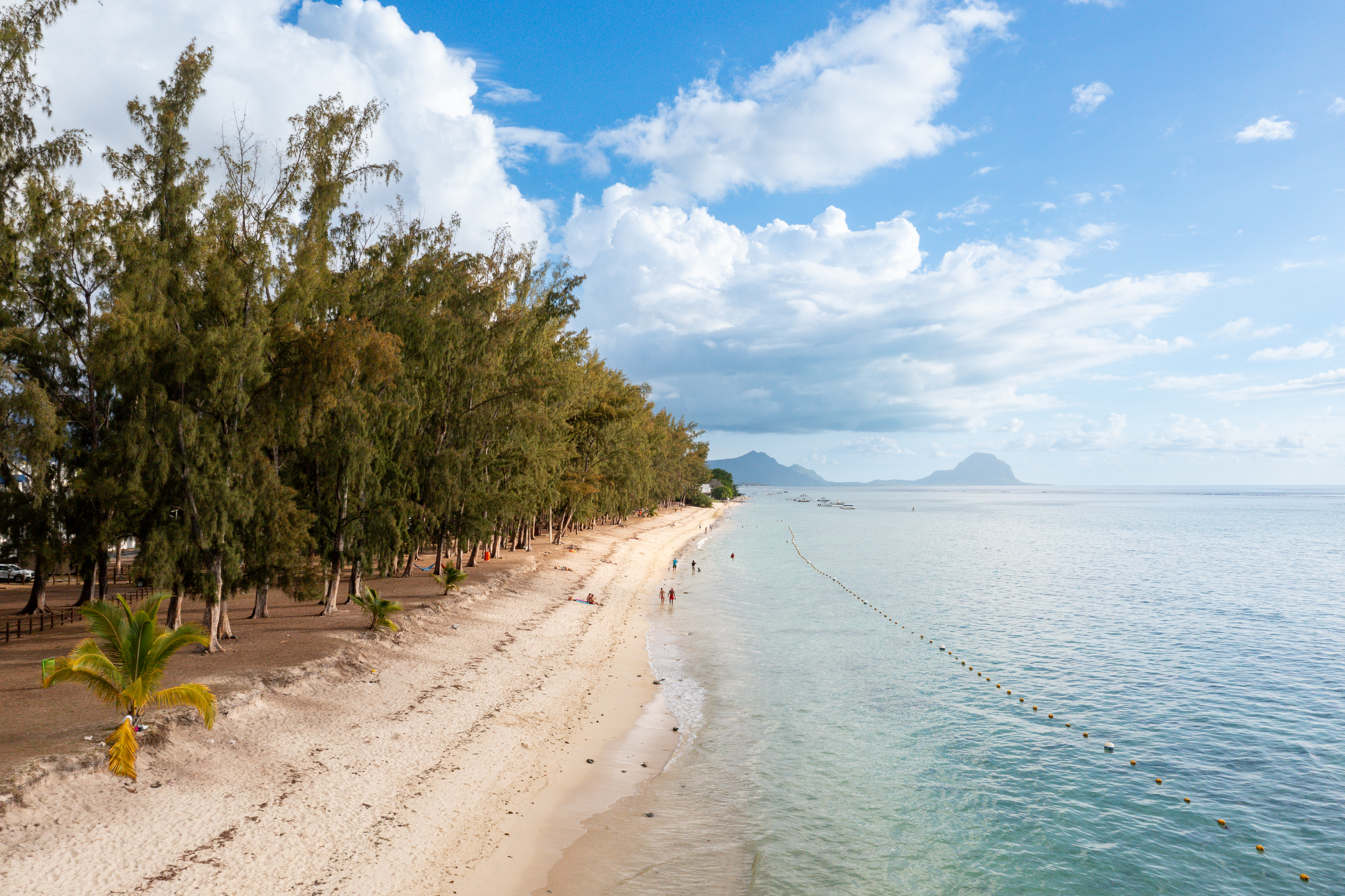
Flic en Flac, a beach on the western part of the island

Tourism in Mauritius is an important component of the Mauritian economy as well as a significant source of its foreign exchange revenues. The tourism industry is also a major economic pillar on the island of Rodrigues; however, tourism has not been developed in Agaléga Islands. Mauritius is mostly appreciated by tourists for its natural environment and man-made attractions, the multi-ethnic and cultural diversity of the population, the tropical climate, beaches and water sports. Sea level rise and coral bleaching due to climate change threatens the Mauritian tourism sector.

== History ==
In the past thirty years, Mauritius has developed from a low-income economy based on agriculture to a middle-income diversified economy. Much of this economic growth has been the result of the expansion of the luxury tourism sector. Mauritius was mainly dependent on the sugar and textiles industries; as world sugar prices declined and the production of textiles became economically unfeasible, the government decided to expand the tourist industry. Over the years, most visitors to Mauritius have come from European countries. Due to the economic downturn of European debt crisis, the government decided to diversify its market by providing direct flights to Asian and African countries which were experiencing higher growth in terms of their arrival.

== Overview ==
The tourism sector is supervised by the Ministry of Tourism and Leisure. The Mauritius Tourism Promotion Authority (MTPA) promotes Mauritius by conducting advertising campaigns, participating in tourism fairs and organizing, in collaboration with the local tourism industry, promotional campaign and activities in Mauritius and abroad. The Tourism Authority (TA) is responsible for licensing, regulating and supervising the activities of tourist enterprises, pleasure craft, skippers and canvassers. It also contributes to the uplifting of the destination and provides technical assistance to Rodrigues island. The Association des Hôteliers et Restaurateurs de l'île Maurice (AHRIM) is a non-profitable organization set up in 1973 to represent and promote the interests of hotels and restaurants in Mauritius.

Major Mauritian hotel groups include LUX* Resorts & Hotels, Beachcomber Resorts & Hotels, Veranda Resorts, Heritage Resorts & Golf, Sun Resorts, Constance, Long Beach resorts and Attitude,

Mauritius currently has two UNESCO World Heritage Sites, namely Aapravasi Ghat and Le Morne Cultural Landscape. Additionally, Black River Gorges National Park is currently on the UNESCO tentative list.

== Statistics ==
Yearly tourist arrivals in thousands

According to Statistics Mauritius, total passenger arrivals to Mauritius in 2011 was 1,294,387 and tourist arrivals for the year attained 964,642. In 2012, two emerging markets, the Russian Federation and People’s Republic of China, registered positive growths of 58.9% and 38.0%, respectively. According to the Bank of Mauritius, the gross tourism receipts was Rs44 billion ( equal to US$ 949 million ) in 2012. The forecast number of tourist arrival for 2013 was 1 million.

Data from Statsmauritius.govmu.org on tourism arrivals for 2018 shows that "1.The number of tourist arrivals for the year 2018 increased by 4.3% to attain 1,399,408 compared to 1,341,860 for the year 2017 2. Tourist arrivals by air increased by 3.6% from 1,312,295 in 2017 to 1,359,688 in 2018 while those arriving by sea increased by 34.3% from 29,565 to 39,720. 3. The performance of our main markets, which accounted for 71% of total tourist arrivals for the year 2018".

Most visitors arriving to Mauritius were from the following countries or territories of residence:

Nationality	Total				
Nationality	2018	2017	2016	2015	2014
	2018	2017	2016	2015	2014
France	285,271	273,419	271,963	254,323	243,665
United Kingdom	151,846	149,807	141,904	129,754	115,326
Réunion	138,439	146,040	146,203	143,845	141,665
Germany	132,815	118,856	103,761	75,237	62,231
South Africa	128,091	112,129	104,834	101,943	93,120
India	85,766	86,294	82,670	72,135	61,167
China	65,739	72,951	79,374	89,584	63,365
Switzerland	41,084	40,252	36,272	30,680	29,985
Italy	38,362	35,101	31,337	29,185	29,557
Australia	20,948	21,271	18,559	17,835	17,529
Austria	18,577	17,596	16,643	11,425	8,303
Saudi Arabia	16,507	5,142	3,164	2,854	2,390
Netherlands	16,418	13,269	10,080	6,926	4,796
Belgium	15,727	16,420	15,675	14,223	11,465
Sweden	15,539	15,516	14,551	11,634	6,454
Spain	15,064	15,252	15,304	10,013	8,633
Madagascar	14,365	12,730	11,740	12,215	13,039
Czech Republic	14,254	10,495	8,503	7,267	6,852
United Arab Emirates	12,058	11,866	9,614	9,050	8,001
Russia	11,006	11,153	9,295	11,444	13,289
Poland	10,805	11,318			
United States	10,525	9,655			
Canada	7,751	6,908			
Denmark	7,418	6,971			
South Korea	7,204	6,858			
Seychelles	5,370	6,258			
Norway	5,332	5,005			
Finland	4,949	4,461			
Portugal	4,912	4,254			
Romania	4,369	2,691			
Slovakia	4,237	3,235			
Kenya	4,035	3,422			
Ireland	4,004	4,020			
Brazil	3,744	4,659			
Hungary	3,276	2,829			
Philippines	2,871	2,742			
Singapore	2,809	3,230			
Ukraine	2,765	2,854			
Turkey	2,600	2,594			
Indonesia	2,519	2,670			
Zimbabwe	2,496	2,553			
Malaysia	2,264	4,352			
Israel	2,167	1,698			
Nigeria	2,157	1,331			
Japan	2,046	2,315			
Luxembourg	1,924	1,802			
Bulgaria	1,913	1,386			
Taiwan	1,767	1,592			
Slovenia	1,740	1,312			
Hong Kong	1,519	1,512			
Namibia	1,358	1,505			
Mayotte	1,355	1,340			
Pakistan	1,207	1,088			
Bangladesh	1,195	1,157			
Spain	1,182	1,331			
Zambia	1,124	994			
Botswana	1,070	1,072			
Estonia	1,049	808			
New Zealand	1,002	1,052			
Comoros	956	886			
Greece	938	1,034			
Morocco	901	771			
Lithuania	829	1,046			
Croatia	823	675			
Mozambique	809	876			
Latvia	800	672			
Tanzania	797	697			
Total	1,399,287	1,341,860	1,275,227	1,151,252	1,038,968

== See also ==
- Mauritius Tourism Promotion Authority (MTPA)
- Visa policy of Mauritius
