= Africa Eats =

Investment holding company

- Type: Public company
- Traded as: EATS on SEM X
- Industry: Agribusiness
- Founded: July 2020
- Founders: Luni Libes; Jumaane Tafawa
- Headquarters: Mauritius
- Area served: Africa
- Parent: Fledge
- Website: Official website

Africa Eats is a Mauritius-based investment holding company which invests in agribusinesses across Africa. Since December 2024, Africa Eats has been listed on the Stock Exchange of Mauritius.

== History ==
Africa Eats was established as a spin-off from Fledge, a Seattle-based venture capital fund and business accelerator founded by Luni Libes in 2012.

Africa Eats was listed on the Stock Exchange of Mauritius in December 2024.

== Portfolio ==
Africa Eats invests in food production, animal feed, and logistics. Its portfolio includes two dozen companies operating in a dozen countries across the continent of Africa.

== Business Model ==
The business model used by Africa Eats is different. It has the look and feel of a Venture_capital fund but reuses many parts of Berkshire_Hathaway's unique investing style.
