= Sunil Benimadhu =

Mauritian businessperson

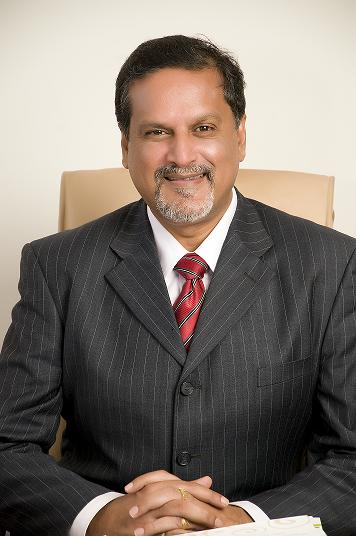
- Sunil Benimadhu
- Born: Rose Belle, British Mauritius
- Education: University of Aix-Marseille (BSc) (MA) (DEA) University of Illinois Urbana-Champaign (MBA)
- Occupation: Economist
- Known for: CEO of the Stock Exchange of Mauritius

Sunil Benimadhu is the Chief Executive of the Stock Exchange of Mauritius (SEM). He has spearheaded the project to enable the SEM join the World Federation of Exchanges, a key standard-setter in the stock exchange industry. Benimadhu was elected President of the African Securities Exchanges Association (ASEA) on the August 30, 2010. He was a member of the Executive Committee of the South Asian Federation of Exchanges (SAFE), and the Chairman of the Committee of SADC Stock Exchanges (CoSSE). Benimadhu is also a regular speaker on emerging markets and on African markets in international stock exchange conferences.

Before joining the SEM, Benimadhu worked in the Treasury Department of the African Development Bank (ADB). He was the General Manager of the National Mutual Fund Limited in Mauritius and played an instrumental role in the structuring, marketing and setting up of the National Investment Trust Limited, one of the largest investment trusts listed on the SEM.

== Education ==
Benimadhu holds an MBA in Finance and Investment from the University of Illinois Urbana-Champaign, United States. He also holds a DEA in Development Economics and a Maîtrise in Macro-Economics from the University of Aix-Marseille, France.

== Professional career ==
=== Current positions ===
- Chief executive - Stock Exchange of Mauritius Port Louis, Mauritius (1998–present)
- Senior Lecturer - University of Mauritius, Reduit, Mauritius (1992–present)
- Board Member - Treasury and Foreign Currency Management Fund

=== Previous position(s) ===
- Portfolio Manager- African Development Bank Abidjan (1997–1998)
- Lecturer - Mauritius Institute of Management, University of Surrey Port Louis (1995–1997)
- General manager - National Mutual Fund Port Louis (1992–1997)
