= Clothing in Mauritius =

Clothing production is an important industry in Mauritius. Clothes are imported and exported in Mauritius. The clothing sector was on the verge of bankruptcy in 2008, but recovered. The sector employed 67,174 people in 2007 and made 1.45 billion dollars in revenue that same year.

== History ==
Clothing and textile industry in Mauritius started in the 1970s, when foreign investors (mainly coming from Hong Kong) started setting up firms which would assemble imported textiles into clothing; most of those activities happed in the export processing zones (EPZs). Europe and the United States are the traditional export markets of Mauritius; preferential trading deals with partners such as the European Union and the United States in some economic sectors, such as the sugar industry and in textile and clothing sectors, resulted in the significant growth of the total exports of Mauritius, especially from the 1970s to the 1990s.

=== 1970s ===
Sir Edouard Lim Fat, a Sino-Mauritian born in 1921, is generally acknowledged as the creator of the Mauritius Export Processing Zone (EPZ) in 1970. The structure of Mauritius EPZ was modelled based on the EPZs found in Singapore, Hong Kong, Malaysia, and others, and it was based on manufacturing for exports only. In the first few months, there were 5 factories set in the EPZ with more than 500 employees; the original and majority of the textile or apparel stakeholders were from Hong Kong.

In the early 1970s, significant investors in the Mauritian EPZ were from Hong Kong, Taiwan, Malaysia, and Singapore, who contributed to the high growth rate during the early 1970s. The results of the influx of foreign direct investment was the benefits of Mauritius' transnational ethnic networks, especially the small Chinese community in Mauritius (Sino-Mauritians) who played a significant role in attracting foreign direct investment from Hong Kong. People from the Hong Kong textile industry came to Mauritius and introduced apparel and textile machinery with them. During that time, Mauritius had the labour capacity, and Mauritian women preferred working in the factory instead of working on the sugar plantations due to the lower working hours (8 hours in factory instead of 12 hours on the sugar plantation) and the higher pay (3-5 rupees per day in factory work instead of 2-2.5 rupees per day on sugar plantation).

In 1973, 23% companies under the Mauritius EPZ were textile-apparel companies; these were Vettex Limited, Floreal Knitwear, Textiles Industries Limited, Compagnie Mauricienne Commerciale (CMT), and Orkay Synthetics.

In 1975, Mauritius signed the Lomé convention and was given preferential access to European markets leading to a duty-free agreement where no duty had to be paid if Mauritian goods were imported in Europe; this duty-free agreement attracted foreign investors to Mauritius. While the first half of the 1970s showed fast development for Mauritius export companies, the latter 1970s showed no growth in the textile-apparel industry due to political and economic factors, which include firms having to acknowledge world finances, oil crisis, and the need for public transportation development in Mauritius, among many others.

=== 1980s ===
In the 1980s, many Hong Kong companies left Mauritius leaving equipment and trained Mauritian labour behind as they realized that they could keep their assets in China. Therefore, local Mauritian investors continued and developed new textile and clothing firms; textile and apparel production increased in Mauritius due to a civil war in Sri Lanka.

=== 1990s ===
In the 1990s, many Hong Kong investors had to relocate their business to Vietnam and China due to lower production and labour cost; this lead more local investors to invest in the Mauritian textile and apparel industry. The textiles and clothing industry in Mauritius reached its employment peak in 1999 and had to outsource in Madagascar where the labour force was cheaper; the Mauritian factory labourers however decided to shift to the newly formed tourism industry and foreign labourers from Sri Lanka, India, and China had to be brought in the country.

=== 2000s ===
The beginning of the 2000s were challenging to the Mauritian and textile industry: the Lomé agreement was ended but was replaced by the COTONOU Agreement which was signed in 2000; this agreement allowed the continuation of trade benefits between African, Caribbean, and Pacific countries and the European Union. In 2000, Mauritius was excluded from the African Growth and Opportunity Act (which allowed duty free garments to the United States) and was only included in 2006.

Since the 2000 FOCAC Ministerial Conference agreement, China took third position (following France and India) in terms of traditional source of imports in Mauritius. Imports of textiles machinery and equipment, along with manufactured consumer goods, became bulk of imports from China. By investing in local spinning capacity, Mauritius reduced its dependence on Chinese yarn and textile imports, which lead to a reduction in textile imports from China.

In 2003, most of Mauritius apparel production was moved to Madagascar as labour was too expensive in Mauritius. All the Hong Kong companies left Mauritius and gave their facilities to the Mauritians. The items manufactured in Mauritius however became stagnant and low quality.

From 2004 to 2007, Mauritian exports to the US decreased by 49%.

== Fashion in Mauritius ==
Fashion in Mauritius is also influenced by the vague formality-related rules, personal preference, difference between urban and rural lifestyle, and by the diverse origins of the Mauritian population, including ethnoreligious identities. Mauritians of all backgrounds wear bright colours, especially Mauritian women.

Flip-flops (locally known as 'savat') are worn by all Mauritian regardless of their cultural backgrounds, which are suitable for the Mauritian climate. Beachwear and tight/revealing clothing is acceptable in many resorts but they are not considered appropriate in towns and villages.

=== Western-style clothing ===
Western-style clothing is worn by the majority of Mauritian population in their everyday life; however, the fashion is influenced by the diverse origins of the population. Most Mauritian men have 1 or 2 suits, which are worn on special occasions.

=== Ethnic clothing ===
==== Creole dress/Sega dress ====
Creole dress (Sega dress) traditionally worn by female Sega dancers is composed of bright blouses and long skirts while men typically wear rolled-up trousers, straw hats, and colourful shirts. Sega dancers dress often display colourful patterns. Sega clothing appears to be related to the dressing of their ancestors.

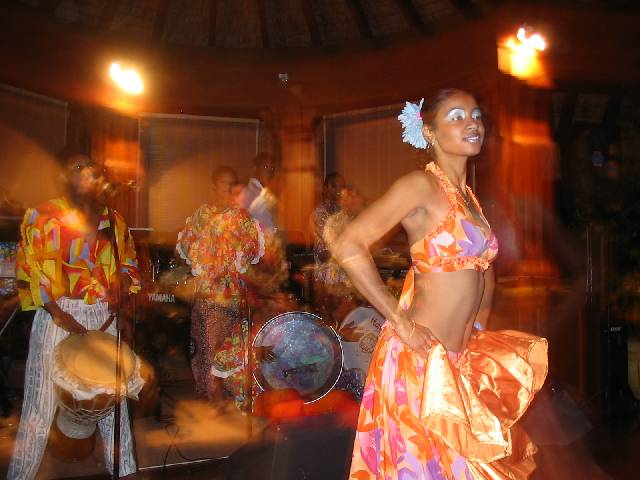
Sega performers, men and women wore colourful clothing, 2004.

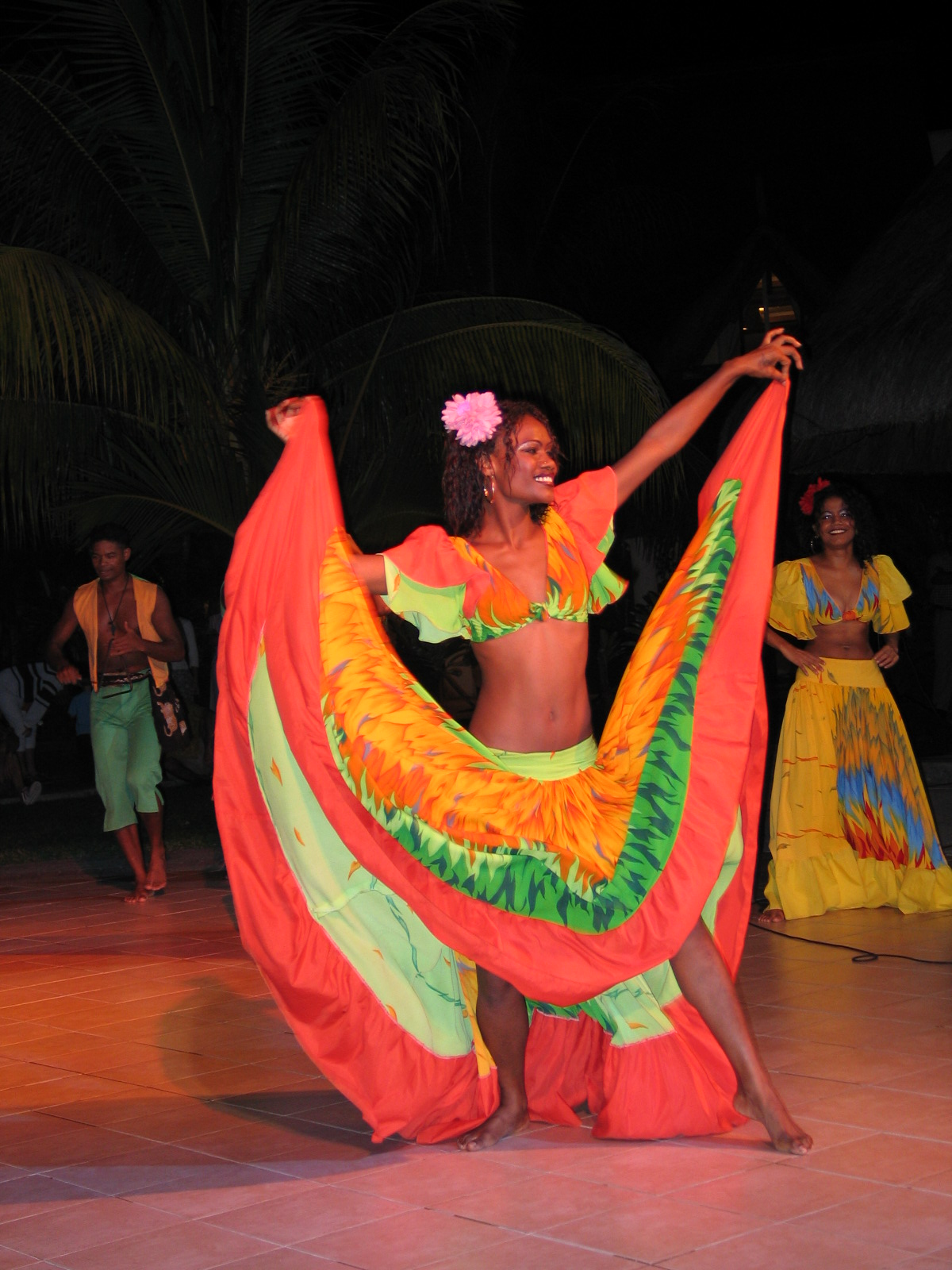
Men and women wearing Sega clothing.

==== Mauritians of Indian origin/Hindu clothing ====
The sari is a traditional Hindu dress for Indo-Mauritian women but they sometimes switch to churidar for comfortability. Some traditional Indo-Mauritian men wear dhoti-kurta while others mixed them with a Western style pant-shirt. Bright jewellery mostly of gold or silver is commonly worn among Mauritian-Indian women, especially for those who reside in rural areas. Devout Hindu rural women, oftentimes wear tika/bindi on their forehead and sometimes mehendi on their hands which is very common among single ladies. While those who are married, wear vermilion on their middle parting hair and wedding chain around their neck to show their marital status. Indian footwear like Kolhapuri Chappal is very famous among men during religious activities whereas women prefer wearing heels with some of them even switching to flat footwears depending on the occasion.

==== Muslim clothing ====
Muslims from diverse social background and coming from diverse regions of India settled in Mauritius in Colonial Mauritius.The traditional women clothing among the muslim population is Indian clothing of various styles (dress, trousers, shirts, orhni (a matching veil which covers the head and shoulder areas), and sometimes sari). A large proportion of muslim women have adopted the hijab and wear it together with either Western-style or Indian clothing. Burqa is worn by a minority of muslim women. Muslim men may be found wearing cloth skullcaps or a fez on important religious events.

==== Mauritian of Chinese Origins ====
The Mandarin gown is a traditional dress for Mauritian of Chinese origins.

== Work and School attire culture ==
=== Work attire culture ===
In a white-collar work setting, men's attire can be informal but they should not be casual; they are typically expected to wear long-sleeved shirt and well-cut trousers instead of jeans. There is no restriction on colour; however, white and pale blue are preferred for upper garments while trousers are typically found in dark colours; shoes are always dark in colour.

Women has more freedom of choice than men. A common form of working attire for women is a plain dark skirt (red skirt is however accepted) with a blouse in a pastel colour. Printed dresses with a simple classic cut is also appropriate. Women can also wear trousers. Some traditional dresses such as the Indian sari can also be worn. The cheongsam is however not accepted due to its kinky image and therefore do not reflect the image of a serious business woman.

Both men and women are allowed to wear discreet jewelleries; men usually wear a watch, a wedding or signet ring, and sometimes a crucifix on a small chain. Women are allowed to wear earrings and bracelets.

=== School Uniforms culture ===
In Mauritius, school uniforms are typically compulsory from the primary school to the higher secondary level; the use of uniforms at school date back to the British colonial period. Very few private schools which are based on a French education system do not require school uniforms.

== See also ==
- Culture of Mauritius
