= Mauritius Tourism Promotion Authority =

Tourism in Mauritius

Agency overview
- Formed: 1996
- Jurisdiction: Government of Mauritius
- Headquarters: Port Louis, Mauritius
- Parent agency: Ministry of Tourism and Leisure
- Website: mauritiusnow.com

The Mauritius Tourism Promotion Authority (MTPA) is a statutory board under the Ministry of Tourism and Leisure of Mauritius established in 1996 by the MTPA Act. The task of the MTPA is to promote the country's tourism industry, provide information to tourists on facilities, infrastructures and services, to initiate action to promote cooperation with other tourism agencies, to conduct research into market trends and market opportunities and disseminate such information and other relevant statistical data on Mauritius.

The ex-Director of the Mauritius Tourism Promotion Authority was interviewed under caution by the Mauritius Financial Crimes Commission because of allegations of corruption in France.

== Offices ==
The MTPA overseas offices in the following countries:

- France – Paris
- United Kingdom – London
- South Africa – Sandton
- Italy – Milan
- China – Beijing
- Germany – Munich
- Switzerland – Zürich
- India – Mumbai
- Réunion – Réunion
- Saudi Arabia – Riyadh
- Spain – Spain
- Portugal – Portugal
- Poland – Poland
- Russia – Moscow

== See also ==
- Tourism in Mauritius
- Ministry of Tourism and Leisure
