= Mineral industry of Mauritius =

Mineral industry in Mauritius

The mineral industry of Mauritius is small; the country does not play a significant role in the world's production or consumption of minerals. As of 2006, Mauritius produced basalt for construction, fertilizers, lime from coral, semi-manufactured steel, and solar-evaporate sea salt. Local companies also cut imported diamond.

As of 2006, imports of mineral fuels accounted for 17% of total imports; iron and steel, 2%; and cement, 1%. In March 2006, concerns about import reliance and rising petroleum prices led the Government to sign an agreement with ONGC Videsh Ltd. of India for offshore petroleum exploration.

In 2006, the production of sand increased by 52%; semi-manufactured steel, by 2%; and fertilizers, by 1%. The reported value of sand production amounted to about $1 million.

Aggregates are produced by Gamma Civic Ltd. and United Basalt Products Ltd.; fertilizers, by Mauritius Chemical and Fertilizer Industry; salt, by Mont Calme; and semi-manufactured steel, by Consolidated Steel. These companies are privately owned.
