= Phoenix Beverages =

Brewery in Mauritius

Phoenix Beverages Group
- Formerly: Mauritius Breweries Ltd (MBL)
- Type: Public
- Traded as: SEM: MBL
- Industry: Beverage
- Predecessor: Phoenix Camp Minerals Limited (PCM), Mauritius Breweries Ltd (MBL)
- Founded: 9 September 1960
- Headquarters: Pont Fer, Vacoas-Phoenix, Mauritius
- Area served: Mauritius
- Key people: Bernard Theys (CEO); Arnaud Lagesse (Chairman)
- Products: Beers (Phoenix, Blue Marlin, Gister), wines and spirits, soft drinks (Eski, Coca-Cola, Sprite, Pearona, Cidona...), table water (Crystal)
- Production output: 2.44 million hectolitres of alcoholic and non alcoholic drinks
- Total assets: ▲ Rs 9.048 billion
- Number of employees: 1,750+ (2023)
- Subsidiaries: Phoenix Beverages Overseas Ltd, The (Mauritius) Glass Gallery Ltd, Phoenix Réunion SARL
- Website: www.phoenixbeveragesgroup.mu

Phoenix Beverages is the largest brewery in Mauritius. Their Phoenix Beer (lager) is widely distributed on the island and is exported to Europe, Australia, Reunion Island, Madagascar, etc. The company also has connections with the Guinness Brewery and is listed on the Stock Exchange of Mauritius. They have three plants in Mauritius, PhoenixBev Brewery Plant, PhoenixBev Carbonated Soft Drinks Plant and PhoenixBev Stills Plant. They also have a plant in Reunion Island known as Edena Boissons.

== History ==
=== The Millenium Pillar (1999–2022) ===
The “Millennium Pillar” was an initiative aimed at enhancing the cityscape of Vacoas-Phoenix by erecting a statue at its roundabout, colloquially known as the “Rond-Point La Bière.” The sculpture depicted the Vacoas tree, complete with roots and a trunk adorned with basalt, reflecting the tree’s leaves. At its pinnacle stood a bronze rendition of a nascent Phoenix. The bronze casting was executed by the Forges Tardieu foundry, while the supporting tree structure was built by General Construction. This monumental stele, standing 10 meters tall and one meter wide, was erected in 1999 to commemorate both the transition from 1999 to 2000 and the 35th anniversary of Vacoas-Phoenix’s elevation to a municipality. It was officially unveiled on September 23, 1999. Today, a portion of the sculpture, particularly the Phoenix, adorns the entrance of Phoenix Beverages Limited.

=== La Statue de la RenaiSenses (2022–present) ===
This was conceptualized and curated by ZeeArts, in collaboration with Indian and Mauritian artists Kishor Kanta and Vick Shibdoyal, respectively. The project also received support from Phoenix Beverages Group’s welding team, Luxconsult as engineering consultants, and Transinvest for the groundwork at the roundabout. Named “The Statue of RenaiSenses” or “La Statue de la RenaiSenses,” the sculpture incorporates salvaged metals and spare metallic parts from Phoenix Beverages Group’s old bottling lines.

== Corporate history ==
- 1931 - The company is incorporated as Phoenix Camp Minerals Limited (PCM)
- 1953 - Signature of their bottling agreement with Coca-Cola
- 1960 - Creation of Mauritius Breweries Ltd (MBL)
- 1963 - Inauguration of brewery
- 1991 - Creation of the (Mauritius) Glass Gallery Ltd to recycle glass waste
- 1993 - MBL is listed on the Stock Exchange of Mauritius
- 2003 - Change of name of MBL to Phoenix Beverages Ltd (PBL)
- 2008 - Fusion of PBL and PCM
- 2014 - PBL acquires the Eski soft-drink company and also begins wine bottling operations
- 2015 - Signature of bottling agreement with Schweppes International for Orangina
- 2016 - Acquisition of Edena SA (incorporated in Réunion Island)
- 2021 - Change of name of Koté Vins & Spirits to PhoenixBev Wines & Spirits
- 2021 - Launch of PhoenixEarth Initiative
- 2022 - Setting up of Manawa Craft Brewery Plant in Phoenix
- 2022 - The company starts to take steps to reduce its carbon footprint. Switches to green energy.
- 2024 - PBL acquires 28.15% shares in African Originals (incorporated in Kenya)
- 2025 - PBL acquires 54.4% shares in Seychelles Breweries Ltd (incorporated in Seychelles)

== Products ==
=== Product history ===
- 1931 - Launch of Phoenix Camp Minerals: Sparkling Aerated Water
- 1956 - Launch of Fanta
- 1963 - Launch of Phoenix beer
- 1964 - Launch of Stella Pils beer
- 1965 - Launch of Sprite soft-drink
- 1975 - Launch of Guinness stout
- 1976 - Launch of Crystal table water
- 1979 - Launch of Pearona
- 1986 - Launch of Diet Coke
- 1988 - Launch of Malta Guinness
- 1989 - Launch of Blue Marlin beer
- 1990 - Launch of Appletiser
- 2005 - Launch of Phoenix Special Brew beer
- 2008 - Launch of Phoenix Fresh beer
- 2014 - Acquisition of Eski soft-drink brand
- 2015 - Launch of GR8 wine
- 2016 - Launch of Gister Premium beer
- 2017 - Launch of Fuze Tea
- 2017 - Launch of 5Alive Pulpy juice
- 2020 - Relaunch of Cidona
- 2020 - Launch of Phoenix Beer Keg 5L
- 2022 - Launch of Manawa craft beer
- 2022 - Launch of Phoenix Panaché
- 2023 - Launch of Salitos

=== Phoenix Beer ===
A bottle of Phoenix

Phoenix Beer began production in 1963. On August 26, 1963, Phoenix Beer was officially launched. The inaugural tasting was conducted by Head Brewer Roger Blasco, a man deeply passionate about brewing. At the time of its inauguration, the factory employed 40 individuals with the aim to produce 35,000 hectolitres of beer annually. In the very first year, 30,000 hectolitres were produced.

Journalists remarked that his dedication to beer was so profound that he could have spent his entire life in the brewery. Once brewed, the beer was bottled in ‘Chopine’ (35 ml) and bottles (75 ml) formats, sealed with a cap, and distributed to retailers across the island.

Phoenix Beer has an ABV of 5%, and is described as a "golden lager" by the manufacturers. Their malted spring barley comes from Australia and Europe. The beer is sold in 650 ml (23 imp fl oz; 22 US fl oz) and 330 ml (12 imp fl oz; 11 US fl oz) bottles and 330 ml (12 imp fl oz; 11 US fl oz) cans. It is also available in draught at local resorts and restaurants.

Phoenix also produces two strong lager style beers. One called Blue Marlin; the other Phoenix Special Brew. They brew Guinness Foreign Extra Stout under licence.

== History behind the name ==
History dates back to 1845 in Mauritius, where a sugar estate named Phoenix was established at the confluence of two rivers: the Mesnil and Rivière Sèche. The estate derived its name from the endemic palm trees found exclusively in Mauritius and Réunion Island, bearing a resemblance to the Phoenician palm. Phoenix Sugar Estate, under the stewardship of Henry Barlow, clinched a gold medal for its premium quality sugar. However, due to a financial downturn, the sugar mill ceased operations in 1874. By 1880, Phoenix Sugar Estate merged with Trianon Sugar Estate, leading to the transfer of all sugarcane plantations to the latter. The 1892 cyclone wreaked destruction of the Trianon Sugar Estate, leaving the sugar mill building bereft of its machinery and ultimately leading to its demolition. The Phoenix region was named in homage to the sugar mill’s name. It was only later that the brewery was established in Phoenix, attributed to its favourable climatic conditions, strategic location for island-wide product distribution, and water supply. Thus, the beer was named after the city’s rich history, drawing inspiration from both the mythical bird and the Phoenician palms. Just as the sugar was adorned with gold medals, the beer garnered multiple accolades and stands today as a staple brand in the heart of Mauritians.

== Awards ==
Brand	Year	Award	Rank	Notes
Stella Pils	1976	Brewex – UK	Gold Medal	
Stella Pils	1989	Monde Selection	Gold Medal	
Stella Pils	1997	Australian International Beer Awards	Silver Award	
Stella Pils	2009	Monde Selection	Gold Medal	Stella Pils 330ml
Phoenix Beer	1981	Monde selection	Gold Medal	
Phoenix Beer	1983	Brewex – UK	Gold Medal	
Phoenix Beer	1997	Australian International Beer Awards	Silver Award	
Phoenix Beer	2001	Australian International Beer Awards	Gold Award	
Phoenix Beer	2003	Monde Selection	Gold Medal	Phoenix Beer 330ml
Phoenix Beer	2006	Monde Selection	Silver Medal	Phoenix Beer 330ml
Phoenix Beer	2007	Monde Selection	Grand Gold Medal	Phoenix Beer 330ml
Phoenix Beer	2008	Monde Selection	Gold Medal	Phoenix Beer 330ml
Phoenix Beer	2008	Monde Selection	Silver	Phoenix Beer Can
Phoenix Beer	2009	Monde Selection	Gold Medal	Phoenix Beer 650ml
Phoenix Beer	2009	Monde Selection	Silver	Phoenix Beer Can
Phoenix Beer	2009	Monde Selection	Gold Medal + High International Quality Trophy 2009	Phoenix Beer 330ml
Phoenix Beer	2010	Monde Selection	Gold Medal	Phoenix Beer 650ml
Phoenix Beer	2010	Monde Selection	Gold Medal	Phoenix Beer Can 330ml
Phoenix Beer	2010	Monde Selection	Gold Medal	Phoenix Beer 330ml
Phoenix Beer	2010	Monde Selection	Gold Medal	Phoenix Special Brew 330ml
Phoenix Beer	2010	Monde Selection	Gold Medal	Phoenix Fresh 330ml
Phoenix Beer	2011	Monde Selection	Gold Medal + International High Quality Trophy 2011	Phoenix Beer 650ml
Phoenix Beer	2011	Monde Selection	Gold Medal	Phoenix Beer 330ml
Phoenix Beer	2012	Monde Selection	Gold Medal	Phoenix Beer 650ml
Phoenix Beer	2012	Monde Selection	Gold Medal + International High Quality Trophy 2012	Phoenix Beer 330ml
Phoenix Beer	2013	Monde Selection	Gold Medal	Phoenix Beer 650ml
Phoenix Beer	2013	Monde Selection	Gold Medal	Phoenix Beer 330ml
Phoenix Beer	2014	Monde Selection	Gold Medal + International High Quality Trophy 2014	Phoenix Beer 650ml
Phoenix Beer	2014	Monde Selection	Gold Medal	Phoenix Beer bottle 330ml
Phoenix Beer	2014	Monde Selection	Gold Medal	Phoenix Beer can 330ml
Blue Marlin	1992	Monde Selection	Gold Medal	
Blue Marlin	1997	Australian International Beer Awards	Silver Award	
Blue Marlin	2001	Australian International Beer Awards	Silver Award	
Blue Marlin	2003	Monde Selection	Bronze Medal	Blue Marlin 330ml
Blue Marlin	2006	Monde Selection	Silver Medal	Blue Marlin 330ml
Blue Marlin	2007	Monde Selection	Grand Gold Medal	Blue Marlin 330ml
Blue Marlin	2009	Monde Selection	Silver Medal	Blue Marlin Premium Beer Can
Blue Marlin	2013	Monde Selection	Gold Medal	Blue Marlin Premium Beer 330ml
Guinness	2011	Monde Selection	Gold Medal	Guinness Foreign Extra Stout
Phoenix Cider	2011	Monde Selection	Gold Medal	Phoenix Cider Apple non-alcoholic Cans

== See also ==
- Beer in Africa
