= IBL Ltd =

Mauritian conglomerate

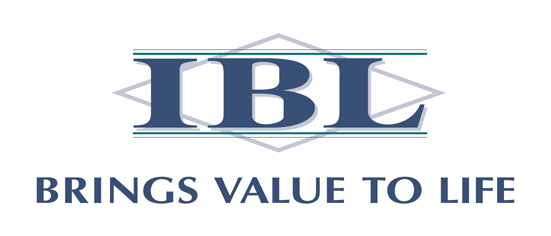
- Formerly: Ireland Blyth Limited (1972–2016); GML Investissement Ltée (surviving company of the 2016 amalgamation)
- Type: Public
- Traded as: SEM: IBLL; SEM-10 component
- Industry: Conglomerate
- Predecessor: Blyth Brothers & Co. Ltd; Ireland Fraser & Co. Ltd
- Founded: 1972 (Ireland Blyth Limited); 1 July 2016 (IBL Ltd)
- Headquarters: IBL House, Caudan Waterfront, Port Louis, Mauritius
- Area served: Mauritius, Réunion, Madagascar, Seychelles, East Africa and other markets
- Key people: Jan Boullé (Chairman); Arnaud Lagesse (Group CEO); Patrice Robert (Deputy Group CEO)
- Revenue: ▲ Rs 124.3 billion (FY2026)
- Operating income: ▲ Rs 8.35 billion (FY2026)
- Net income: ▼ Rs 4.10 billion (FY2026)
- Total assets: ▲ Rs 151.1 billion (2026)
- Total equity: ▲ Rs 52.6 billion (2026)
- Owner: GML Ltée (68.95% of voting rights)
- Number of employees: about 40,000 (2026)
- Subsidiaries: Winners; Naivas (51% via Mambo Retail); Phoenix Beverages; BrandActiv; Lux Island Resorts; United Basalt Products; Bloomage; Eagle Insurance; CNOI
- Website: www.iblgroup.com

IBL Ltd, formerly Ireland Blyth Limited, is a Mauritian conglomerate headquartered at the Caudan Waterfront in Port Louis. Its businesses include supermarket and hypermarket retailing, the manufacture and distribution of beverages and consumer goods, building materials, engineering, seafood processing, hotels, property, insurance, healthcare and logistics. Its ordinary shares are listed on the Stock Exchange of Mauritius (SEM) and are part of the SEM-10 index.

Ireland Blyth Limited was formed in 1972 by the merger of two trading houses established in Mauritius in the 19th century, Blyth Brothers and Ireland Fraser & Co. It was listed on the SEM in 1994. On 1 July 2016 it was amalgamated into its largest shareholder, GML Investissement Ltée, which took the name IBL Ltd. The Lagesse family investment company GML Ltée controls the group through a class of non-dividend voting shares.

In the year to 30 June 2026 the group reported revenue of Rs 124.3 billion. About half of that revenue came from outside Mauritius, mainly from the Kenyan supermarket chain Naivas, which IBL has controlled through a consortium since 2023. The company reports about 40,000 employees.

== History ==
=== Predecessor firms ===
Blyth Brothers traced its establishment in Mauritius to 1830. It was linked to the London merchant house later known as Blyth, Greene, Jourdain & Co. James Blyth (1801–1873), a partner in that house, lived in Mauritius from 1830 to 1839 and sat on the island's Legislative Council from 1833. He acted as an intermediary between London lenders and Mauritian planters, including during the payment of slavery compensation. In 1929 Blyth Brothers became the Mauritius dealer for Caterpillar equipment, an arrangement continued by the group through its subsidiary Scomat.

Ireland Fraser & Co. was founded on 1 July 1850 by George Ireland, Hugh Hunter and James Fraser under the name Hunter, Ireland & Co. It took the name Ireland Fraser & Co. after Hunter left the partnership and was incorporated as a limited company in 1927. Both firms were active in the sugar trade, shipping and the import of goods.

=== Ireland Blyth Limited (1972–2016) ===
The two companies merged in 1972 to form Ireland Blyth Limited, which was admitted to the Official List of the Stock Exchange of Mauritius in 1994. In 1973 it set up Mauritian Eagle Insurance as a joint venture with the South African insurer Eagle Insurance; the company was renamed Eagle Insurance in 2019. The Winners supermarket chain opened its first store in 1994.

In the 2000s the CIEL Group was a leading shareholder. Arnaud Dalais, CIEL's chief executive, chaired Ireland Blyth, and in September 2008 CIEL agreed to buy the 16.05% stake held by CIDL, a Lagesse family company. In November 2009 Ireland Blyth distributed its 29.4% holding in Sun Resorts to its own shareholders. In 2010 GML Investissement Ltée, formed in 2008 from the merger of the Lagesse family's CIDL and DESMEM investment companies, bought shares from CIEL and became the controlling shareholder. GML, Swan Life and Belle Mare Holding signed a shareholders' agreement that year covering a combined 72.77% of the company. Bloomberg described Ireland Blyth in 2008 as the largest company in Mauritius by sales.

In 2011 IBL Consumer Goods and IBL Frozen Foods merged to form IBL BrandActiv. The group bought Robert Le Maire Ltd in 2013. In February 2015 its tuna canner, Thon des Mascareignes, merged with Princes Tuna (Mauritius), leaving IBL with 40.64% of the combined business. In December 2015 IBL agreed to buy the 49% of Winhold, owner of the Winners chain, that it did not already own. Retail then accounted for about 35% of group revenue.

Nicolas Maigrot was chief executive from 2010 until June 2015. Until the 2016 merger the company was run by an executive committee chaired by Arnaud Lagesse, who had been chairman since 2013.

=== Amalgamation with GML Investissement (2016) ===
In 2016 Ireland Blyth Limited was amalgamated "with and into" GML Investissement Ltée (GMLI), which held 48.70% of it. GMLI was the surviving company, under sections 244–248 of the Companies Act 2001. Minority shareholders of Ireland Blyth received 4.8277 GMLI shares for each share they held. The ratio was based on a valuation by EY, and BDO issued a fairness opinion. To keep control of the enlarged company, GML Ltée received about 1.51 billion restricted redeemable shares, which carry votes but no dividend rights. These shares are redeemable if GML's holders own less than 25% of the ordinary shares.

Shareholders of both companies approved the transaction unanimously on 14 June 2016. It took effect on 1 July 2016, when GMLI was renamed IBL Ltd, and the new shares began trading on 14 July 2016. After the amalgamation IBL Ltd also held GMLI's interests in companies including Phoenix Beverages, Lux Island Resorts, Alteo and AfrAsia Bank. Jan Boullé, formerly of the Constance group, became chairman, and Arnaud Lagesse, GMLI's chief executive since 2005, became Group CEO.

=== Since 2016 ===
In 2018 Lux Island Resorts separated its hotel-management business, The Lux Collective, and distributed its shares to shareholders. During the COVID-19 pandemic the group recorded a loss for the year to June 2020, mainly because of impairments. Lux Island Resorts issued convertible bonds to the Mauritius Investment Corporation, a vehicle of the Bank of Mauritius, to support its hotels.

In 2021 the group adopted a regional growth strategy called "Beyond Borders". Its target is to earn more than 60% of revenue outside Mauritius by 2030.

- Kenya retail: In 2022 a consortium led by IBL through Mambo Retail, with Proparco and DEG, bought 40% of Naivas, one of Kenya's largest supermarket chains. A further purchase took the consortium to 51% in July 2023, and Naivas has been consolidated since then.
- East African solar: In March 2023 IBL Energy, with STOA, agreed to buy a majority of Equator Energy, which installs solar systems for businesses in East Africa.
- Réunion retail: In August 2023 IBL took 51% of Make Distribution, operator of the Run Market hypermarkets in Réunion, after the French competition authority cleared the deal.
- Kenya pharmaceuticals: In November 2023 IBL's Elgon Healthcare, with Proparco, completed the purchase of a majority of the Kenyan pharmaceutical distributor Harley's.
- Réunion building materials: In July 2024 United Basalt Products bought 90% of Bazalt Réunion.
- Seychelles brewing: In July 2025 Phoenix Beverages completed the purchase of Diageo's 54.4% stake in Seychelles Breweries.
- AfrAsia Bank sale: In July 2025 IBL sold 22.40% of AfrAsia Bank to Access Bank for about US$117 million, keeping a minority stake.
- Clinic: The group's healthcare arm, Life Together, took control of Nouvelle Clinique du Bon Pasteur in the year to June 2025.

In the 2025 financial year IBL reduced its nine reporting clusters to four: Retail; Consumer Brands & Distribution; Industrials; and Services. In November 2025 it adopted a new brand expression with the line "Shaping better lives and better tomorrows. Together." Patrice Robert became Deputy Group CEO on 1 July 2025.

In July 2026 the French competition authority cleared a combination of Make Distribution with Caillé Grande Distribution, under the joint control of the Caillé and IBL groups. The clearance was subject to commitments by IBL to supply Coca-Cola products to competing retailers on non-discriminatory terms. IBL accordingly classified Run Market as held for sale in its 2026 accounts. Phoenix Beverages' subsidiary Edena was appointed the Coca-Cola bottler for Réunion from 1 October 2026.

== Operations ==
IBL reports four clusters, plus corporate services. The main companies in each are listed below, with the group's percentage holding at 30 June 2025 where IBL has published it.

=== Retail ===
- Winners: a supermarket chain in Mauritius with 28 stores (100%).
- Naivas: a Kenyan supermarket chain with 114 stores. Mambo Retail, in which IBL holds 73.20%, owns 51% of it.
- Run Market: hypermarkets in Réunion (51%), held for sale at June 2026.

=== Consumer Brands & Distribution ===
- Phoenix Beverages: brewer and soft-drinks bottler, listed on the SEM. It is controlled through Camp Investment Company and is consolidated by IBL even though IBL's effective economic interest is below 50%. Phoenix Beverages owns 54.4% of Seychelles Breweries.
- BrandActiv: importer and distributor of food and household brands in Mauritius. Its earliest predecessor, Cold Storage, imported frozen meat from Australia in the early 20th century.
- HealthActiv and Harley's: pharmaceutical distribution in Mauritius and East Africa.

=== Industrials ===
- United Basalt Products: building materials in Mauritius and Réunion, listed on the SEM (33.14%, consolidated).
- Chantier Naval de l'Océan Indien (CNOI): a shipyard in Port Louis for the construction and repair of vessels, with a dry dock 130 metres long (63.83%). Its customers have included the French Navy.
- Scomat, Manser Saxon and Servequip: engineering, contracting and equipment. In 2025 IBL announced an agreement in principle to sell 80% of Scomat to Compagnie Financière de Belmont, owner of the Caterpillar dealer Henri Fraise.
- Seafood: Froid des Mascareignes (cold storage), Marine Biotechnology Products, and an associate stake in Princes Tuna (Mauritius).
- Agro & energy: associate interests in the sugar and energy producer Alteo (27.64%) and in Miwa Sugar, and the solar business IBL Energy.

=== Services ===
- Lux Island Resorts (56.47%) and The Lux Collective: hotel ownership and management, both listed on the SEM.
- Bloomage: property. After a voluntary offer in 2026, Bloomage holds a majority of the listed hotel company BlueLife.
- Eagle Insurance (60%) and City Brokers (a 50% joint venture): insurance.
- Life Together (100%): healthcare, including Nouvelle Clinique du Bon Pasteur.
- Logidis, Somatrans and aviation and shipping agencies: logistics.
- DTOS: corporate and fiduciary services.

== Financial performance ==
Figures are in millions of Mauritian rupees for years ending 30 June, as first reported unless marked.

FY	Revenue	Operating profit	Profit for the year	Attributable to owners	EPS (Rs)	DPS (Rs)	Total assets	Owners' equity	Ref.
2017	33,843	2,664	2,027	1,114	1.64	–	52,984	16,424	
2018	37,074	2,345	2,383	1,509	2.22	–	59,076	16,962	
2019 (Note: As restated in the following year's accounts.)	39,050	2,211	1,302	340	0.50	0.77	59,733	15,566	
2020	36,809	453	(1,426)	(1,191)	(1.75)	0.61	66,284	14,063	
2021	35,796	585	97	20	0.03	0.44	70,825	15,041	
2022	44,977	3,360	1,965	1,183	1.74	0.60	76,104	15,943	
2023	52,113	4,281	4,924	3,087	4.56	0.66	96,062	19,161	
2024 (Note: Includes Naivas and Run Market for the first time.)	101,955	5,435	5,868	3,251	4.78	0.73	127,589	23,173	
2025 (Note: Restated in the 2026 accounts to Rs 109,719 million of revenue after Run Market was classified as a discontinued operation.)	120,784	7,448	4,981	3,007	4.42	0.76	142,806	21,780	
2026	124,256	8,346	4,098	1,740	2.56	0.85	151,091	25,258	

In 2026 group EBITDA was Rs 14.5 billion. Net debt fell to 2.9 times EBITDA, from 3.8 times a year earlier, and group gearing fell from 52% to 44%. Revenue and operating profit by cluster were as follows (Rs million).

Cluster	Revenue 2026	Revenue 2025	Operating profit 2026	Operating profit 2025
Retail	60,950	54,992	2,718	2,060
Consumer Brands & Distribution	30,541	25,901	2,282	2,091
Industrials	20,194	18,300	1,509	1,330
Services	19,547	17,223	3,213	2,607
Corporate services and eliminations	(6,977)	(6,698)	(1,377)	(747)
Group	124,256	109,719	8,346	7,342

=== Funding ===
IBL raises long-term funding under a multi-currency medium-term note programme. It issued Rs 2 billion of notes in 2017, Rs 4 billion in 2019, Rs 3 billion in 2021, Rs 3 billion in 2023 and Rs 3 billion in 2024. Some of these notes are listed on the SEM.

== Ownership and shares ==
IBL Ltd has 680,224,040 ordinary shares in issue, listed on the Official Market of the SEM. GML Ltée also holds 1,510,666,650 unlisted restricted redeemable shares, which gave it 68.95% of the voting rights at 30 June 2025. At that date the holders of more than 5% of the ordinary shares were Espérance International (7.63%), Société Portland (7.38%), Swan Life (5.95%) and Benoit Lagesse (5.72%).

The company's market capitalisation was Rs 36.7 billion at 30 June 2019, Rs 35.4 billion in 2022, Rs 27.2 billion in 2024 and Rs 20.4 billion in 2025, when the share price was Rs 30.00.

== Governance ==
Role	Holder	Period
Chairman	Arnaud Dalais	2000s – c. 2010
Chairman	Thierry Lagesse	to 2013
Chairman	Arnaud Lagesse	2013–2016
Chairman	Jan Boullé	2016–present
Chief executive	Nicolas Maigrot	2010–2015
Chief executive	Arnaud Lagesse	2016–present

== Legal and regulatory matters ==
In 2014 the Competition Commission of Mauritius fined Phoenix Beverages and Stag Beverages for a market-sharing agreement in the beer market. It was the commission's first published cartel decision. Phoenix Beverages was then part of GML and became part of IBL in the 2016 amalgamation. The 2026 French clearance of the Réunion retail combination was conditional on commitments by IBL (see above).

== Sustainability ==
The group publishes integrated reports and measures greenhouse-gas emissions across its businesses under the Greenhouse Gas Protocol. It aims to cover 80% of its global footprint by June 2027. Its social programmes are run through the Fondation Joseph Lagesse.

== See also ==
- Economy of Mauritius
- List of companies of Mauritius
- Stock Exchange of Mauritius
