= George Ireland (businessman) =

Businessman

George Ireland (12 June 1801 – 9 February 1879) was a businessman and one of the founders of Ireland Fraser & Co. Today, known as Ireland Blyth Limited, it is the 2nd largest business group in Mauritius.

Ireland was born on 12 June 1801 to The Rev. Dr. Walter Foggo Ireland and his first wife, Jane Alves. His father was a Church of Scotland minister at the North Leith Parish Church within the Presbytery of Edinburgh.

Ireland Fraser & Co. was founded on 1 July 1850 by George Ireland, Hugh Hunter and James Fraser. The company provided shipping, insurance and general agent services for Mauritius' sugar trade. The original name was Hunter Ireland & Co., but when Hugh Hunter left the company in 1860, the name was changed to Ireland Fraser & Co. The company became Ireland Fraser & Co. Ltd. in 1927.

On 9 October 1856 at St. Paul Church of England, Princes Park, Liverpool, England, Ireland married Emily Hartshorne, the daughter of Hugh Hartshorne, a Barrister from Halifax, Nova Scotia. The couple had two sons, George Hugh Ireland, who joined Ireland Fraser & Co. in 1877 and who became partner in 1879, and Frederick Schomberg Ireland, a lawyer.

Ireland's grandson, John Frederick Ireland, played cricket and made 28 first-class appearances between 1908 and 1912.

Ireland retired from Ireland Fraser & Co. on 30 June 1878, and dying at Blackheath Park, Kent, England on 9 February 1879.
