= Economy of Mauritius =

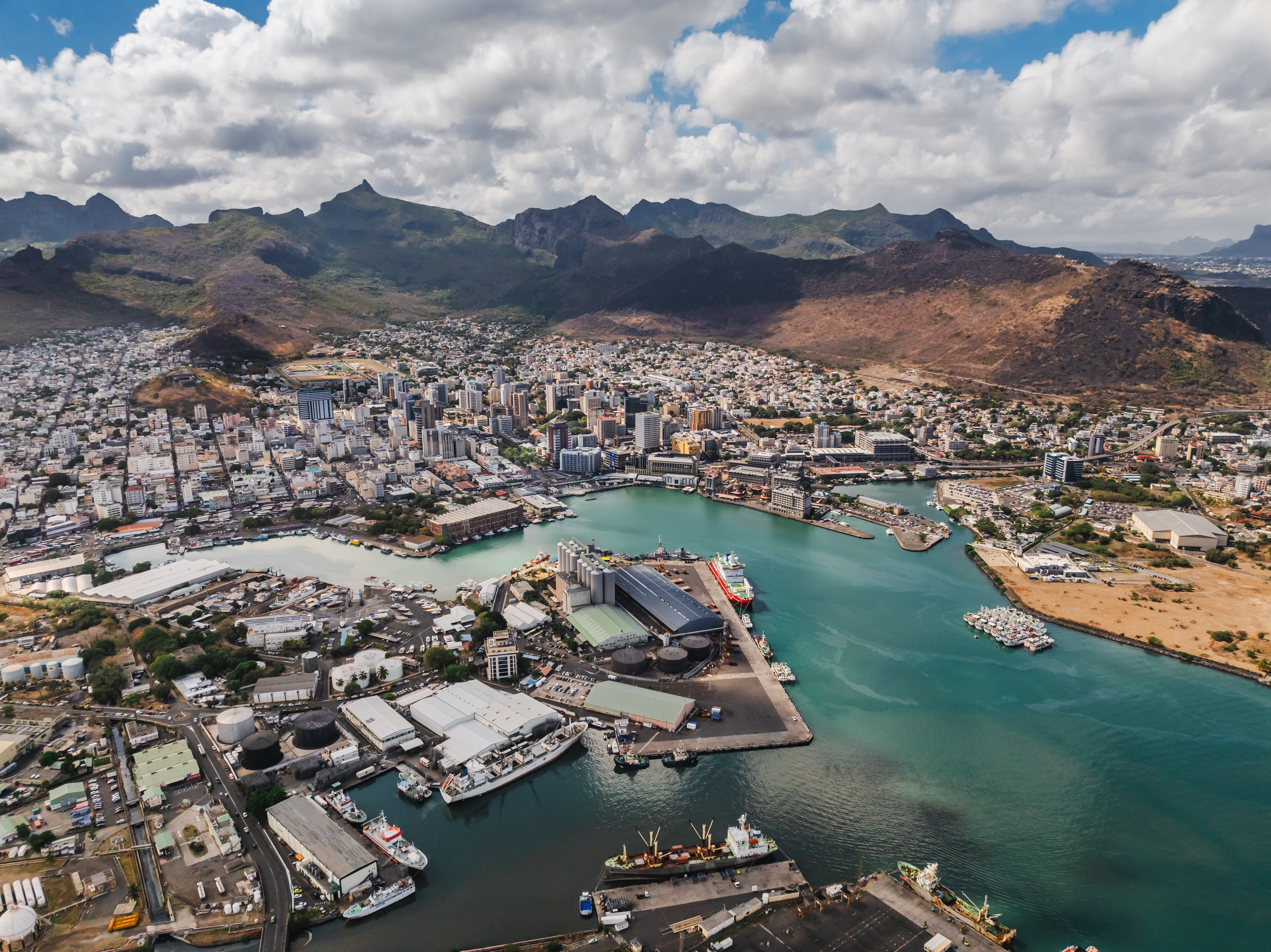
- The capital Port Louis
- Currency: Mauritian rupee (MUR, Rs)
- Fiscal year: 1 July – 30 June
- Trade organisations: AU, AfCFTA, WTO, COMESA, SADC, IOC, IORA
- Country group: Developing/Emerging; Upper-middle income economy

Statistics
- Population: ▲1,268,958 (2025)
- GDP: ▲$16.359 billion (nominal, 2024); ▲$40.468 billion (PPP, 2024)
- GDP rank: 133rd (nominal, 2024); 136th (PPP, 2024)
- GDP growth: ▲5.9% (2022f); ▼6.0% (2023f)
- GDP per capita: ▲$12,973 (nominal, 2024); ▲$32,094 (PPP, 2024)
- GDP per capita rank: 69th (nominal, 2024); 60th (PPP, 2024)
- GDP by sector: Agriculture: 4%; Industry: 21.8%; Services: 74.1%; (2017 est.)
- Inflation (CPI): 4.7% (2020 est.)
- Population below national poverty line: 8% (2006 est.)
- Gini coefficient: 36.8 medium (2017)
- Human Development Index: ▼0.802 very high (2021) (63rd); ▼0.666 medium IHDI (2021)
- Labour force: ▼559,558 (2021); ▲65.3% employment rate (2020)
- Labour force by occupation: Agriculture: 8%; Industry: 29.8%; Services: 62.2%; (2014 est.)
- Unemployment: ▲8.6% (2020)
- Main industries: Food processing (largely sugar milling), textiles, clothing, mining, rum distilling and chemicals, metal products, transport equipment, nonelectrical machinery, tourism

External
- Exports: ▲$2.36 billion (2017 est.)
- Export goods: Clothing and textiles, sugar, cut flowers, molasses, fish, primates (for research)
- Main export partners: European Union 28.5%; United States 12.5%; United Kingdom 12%; Madagascar 6.7%; South Africa 9%; (2017)
- Imports: ▲$4.986 billion (2017 est.)
- Import goods: Manufactured goods, capital equipment, foodstuffs, petroleum products, chemicals
- Main import partners: China 15.7%; France11.5%; United Kingdom10.7%; India10.1%; South Africa 9.7%; (2017)
- FDI stock: NA; Abroad: NA
- Current account: ▼ −$875 million (2017 est.)
- Gross external debt: ▲$19.99 billion (31 December 2017 est.)

Public finance
- Government debt: ▼64% of GDP (2017 est.)
- Foreign reserves: ▲$5.984 billion (31 December 2017 est.)
- Budget balance: −0.3% (of GDP) (2017 est.)
- Revenue: 2.994 billion (2017 est.)
- Spending: 3.038 billion (2017 est.)
- Economic aid: $42 million (1997)
- All values, unless otherwise stated, are in US dollars.

Mauritius has a mixed developing economy based on agriculture, exports, financial services, and tourism. Since the early 1970s, the government of has diversified the country's economy beyond its historical dependence on sugar production.

== Overview ==
In 1961, Professor James Meade painted a bleak picture of the economic prospects of Mauritius, which then had a population of 650,000. All the disadvantages associated with smallness of island states weighed heavily in his conviction that Mauritius was caught in a Malthusian trap and, therefore, if economic progress could at all be achieved, it would be to a very limited extent. Since independence in 1968, Mauritius has developed from a low-income, agriculturally based economy to an upper-middle income diversified economy with growing industrial, financial, ICT, and tourist sectors. For most of the period, annual growth has been roughly 4%. This compares very favourably with other sub-Saharan African countries and is largely due to sustained progress in economic conditions; between 1977 and 2008, growth averaged 4.6% compared with a 2.9% average in sub-Saharan Africa. Also important is that it has achieved what few fast-growing economies achieve, a more equitable income distribution, and inequality (as measured by the Gini coefficient) fell from 45.7 to 38.9 between 1980 and 2006. This remarkable achievement has been reflected in increased life expectancy, lowered infant mortality, and a much-improved infrastructure. Sugarcane is grown on about 90% of the cultivated land area and accounts for 25% of export earnings. The government's development strategy centres on expanding local financial institutions and building a domestic information telecommunications industry. Mauritius has attracted more than 9,000 offshore entities, many aimed at commerce in India and South Africa, and investment in the banking sector alone has reached over $1 billion. Mauritius, with its strong textile sector, has been well poised to take advantage of the Africa Growth and Opportunity Act (AGOA).

With developed legal and commercial infrastructure and a tradition of entrepreneurship and representative government, Mauritius has been recognised as one of the developing world's successful democracies. The economy has shown a considerable degree of resilience, and an environment taking steps to support entrepreneurial activity has moved further toward economic freedom. The island's institutional advantages are noticeable. A well-defined investment code and legal system have made the foreign investment climate in Mauritius one of the most transparent in the region. The economy is increasingly diversified, with significant private-sector activity in sugar, tourism, economic processing zones, and financial services, particularly in offshore enterprises. The government has made steps to modernize the sugar and textile industries, which in the past were overly dependent on trade preferences, while promoting diversification into such areas as information and communications technology, financial and business services, seafood processing and exports, and free trade zones. Agriculture and industry have become less important to the economy, and services, especially tourism, accounted for over 72 percent of GDP. The government still owns utilities and controls imports of rice, flour, petroleum products, and cement.

Europe and the United States are the traditional export markets of Mauritius; preferential trading deals with partners such as the European Union and the United States in some economic sectors, such as the sugar industry and in textile and clothing sectors, resulted in the significant growth of the total exports of Mauritius, especially from the 1970s to the 1990s. Clothing and textile industry in Mauritius started in the 1970s, when foreign investors (mainly coming from Hong Kong) started setting up firms which would assemble imported textiles into clothing; most of those activities happed in the export processing zones (EPZs). The clothing and textile sector spearheaded the industrialization process in Mauritius; in 2019 it represented around 43% of exports.

== History ==
The Mauritian economy has undergone remarkable transformations since independence. From a poor country with high unemployment exporting mainly sugar and buffeted by the vagaries of world demand, Mauritius has become relatively prosperous and diverse, although not without problems.

The 1970s were marked by a strong government commitment to diversify the economy and to provide more high-paying jobs to the population. The promotion of tourism and the creation of the EPZs did much to attain these goals. Between 1971 and 1977, about 64,000 jobs were created. However, in the rush to make work, the government allowed EPZ firms to deny their workers fair wages, the right to organize and strike, and the health and social benefits afforded other Mauritian workers. The boom in the mid-1970s was also fuelled by increased foreign aid and exceptional sugar crops, coupled with high world prices.

The economic situation deteriorated in the late 1970s. Petroleum prices rose, the sugar boom ended, and the balance of payments deficit steadily rose as imports outpaced exports; by 1979 the deficit amounted to a staggering US$111 million. Mauritius approached the IMF and the World Bank for assistance. In exchange for loans and credits to help pay for imports, the government agreed to institute certain measures, including cutting food subsidies, devaluing the currency, and limiting government wage increases.

By the 1980s, thanks to a widespread political consensus on broad policy measures, the economy experienced steady growth, declining inflation, high employment, and increased domestic savings. The EPZ with investment principally from China, Hong Kong and Taiwan, and came into its own, surpassing sugar as the principal export-earning sector and employing more workers than the sugar industry and the government combined, previously the two largest employers. In 1986 Mauritius had its first trade surplus in twelve years. Tourism also boomed, with a concomitant expansion in the number of hotel beds and air flights. An aura of optimism accompanied the country's economic success and prompted comparisons with other Asian countries that had dynamic economies, including Hong Kong, Singapore, Taiwan, and South Korea.

The economy had slowed down by the late 1980s and early 1990s, but the government was optimistic that it could ensure the long-term prosperity of the country by drawing up and implementing prudent development plans. A stock exchange opened in Port Louis in 1989. As of 1993, Mauritius had a gross domestic product (GDP) estimated at US$8.6 billion, with a growth rate of 5.5 percent, and an inflation rate of 10.5 percent.

Mauritius has always depended on external financial flows, such as tourism revenues, offshore financing and foreign aid.

== Economic Miracle ==
The term Mauritian economic miracle, coined by the International Monetary Fund, is used by economists and analysts to describe the unexpected and sustained economic success of Mauritius since its independence in 1968. The phrase highlights how Mauritius defied early predictions of economic stagnation and hardship. Notably, in 1961, Nobel Prize-winning economist James Meade predicted a bleak future for Mauritius, citing its vulnerabilities to adverse weather, dependence on a single crop (sugar), and limited opportunities for employment outside agriculture.

Contrary to Meade’s prognosis, Mauritius achieved average annual GDP growth rates exceeding 5% sustained over several decades, especially from the late 1970s to the early 2000s. Per capita income rose nearly sevenfold from under $1,000 in the 1970s to over $6,700 by the early 21st century, making it one of the highest in Sub-Saharan Africa. This growth was accompanied by improvements in social indicators, including increased life expectancy, education, and equitable income distribution.

Key drivers of the economic miracle include:

- Pragmatic economic liberalization and diversification: Mauritius moved from a monocrop sugar economy to diversify into textiles, tourism, financial services, and information technology. Export Processing Zones (EPZs), established in the 1970s, were central, attracting foreign investment mainly from Hong Kong, China, India, and Taiwan, leveraging preferential trade agreements with Europe and the United States.
- Strong political leadership and institutions: The leadership of Sir Anerood Jugnauth and others enabled stable governance, sound economic planning, and institution-building that fostered investor confidence and social cohesion.
- Human capital investment: Significant public spending on free education and healthcare created a skilled and adaptable workforce, which underpinned industrialization and service sector growth.
- Open trade policies and preferential agreements: Mauritius capitalized on agreements like the Sugar Protocol and the Multi Fibre Arrangement to secure favorable market access, providing rents that financed further development.
- Sound macroeconomic management: Fiscal discipline, inflation control, exchange rate flexibility, and domestic savings encouraged private investment and economic stability.

The "Mauritian economic miracle" stands as a model of how small island developing states can overcome inherent vulnerabilities through pragmatic policies, good governance, and strategic use of global economic integration.

== Policies for success ==
Recent reports on progress on the Millennium Development Goals by the Overseas Development Institute indicated four key reasons for economic success.

1. Heterodox liberalisation and diversification
2. Concerted strategy of nation building
3. Strong and inclusive institutions
4. High levels of equitable public investment

=== Heterodox liberalisation and diversification ===
Mauritius has followed a pragmatic development strategy in which liberalisation process was sequenced and tailored to its competitive advantages and weaknesses. The export-orientated approach has encouraged liberalisation supported by strong state involvement as a facilitator (of the enabling environment for the private sector), as operator (to encourage competition), and as regulator (to protect the economy as well as vulnerable groups and sectors from shocks). Strategies were evidence-based and adapted according to results. There has been consistency and stability, regardless of which political party is in power.

Liberalisation occurred in phases that were initiated to build on advantages the economy enjoyed on the international market.

- 1970s: Mauritius profited from sugar rents, established an export processing zone EPZ and successfully attracted capital and foreign investment in manufacturing, from China, Hong Kong and Taiwan.
- 1980s–1990s: EPZ expanded and led to a significant increase in foreign direct investment (FDI) and tourism. Preferential access to sugar and clothing markets amounted to 7% of GDP in the 1980s and 4.5% in the 1990s; capital and current accounts were liberalised, contributing to an investment and employment boom and the high inflow of FDI brought with it managerial skills.
- 1990s–2010: Further diversification, liberalisation and investment as Chinese investors left to pursue investments in Africa and China.

=== Concerted strategy of nation building ===
A concerted strategy of nation building since independence created the foundations for sustained growth. Partnerships across ethnic groups allowed economic redistribution to be negotiated, and the resulting better balance of economic and political power allowed strong and independent institutions. The emerging political system encouraged a consultative approach to policy formation that allowed strategies for growth to be continued regardless of changes in the parties in power.

=== Strong and inclusive institutions ===
Strong institutions are critical in ensuring country's competitiveness, economic resilience a,nd stability. They have supported development strategies and ensured that export earnings are reinvested in strategic and productive sectors. In the financial sector, they have built a regulated and well-capitalised banking and financial system that protected it from toxic assets prior to the 2008 financial crisis.

==== Corruption laws ====
In 2002, the government adopted the Prevention of Corruption Act, which led to the setting up of an Independent Commission Against Corruption (ICAC) a few months later. The ICAC has the power to detect and investigate corruption and money-laundering offenses and can also confiscate the proceeds of corruption and money laundering. Corruption is not seen as an obstacle to foreign direct investment. Mauritius ranks 55th out of 168 countries in Transparency International’s Corruption Perceptions Index for 2023.

=== High levels of equitable public investment ===
Mauritius has a strong human capital foundation developed through consistent and equitable investment in human development. This enabled Mauritius to exploit advantages, learn from expertise brought in through FDI and maintain competitiveness in a fast evolving international market. Education and health services are free and have been expanded in recent years, in order to create further employment opportunities and ensuring inclusive growth. The educated and adaptable workforce were essential elements of 1980s export-oriented growth. Around 90% of entrepreneurs in the export processing zone (EPZ) and in the manufacturing sector were eventually Mauritian nationals; businesspeople had the human capital, education, and knowledge needed to exploit market opportunities. According to the Government of Mauritius, the general outlook for the manufacturing sector is positive, as the country offers many opportunities to entrepreneurs across the various value chains, but insufficient skilled labour and limited research and development will remain impediments to potentially higher growth in this sector.

== Sectors ==
=== Financial services ===
Mauritius provides an environment for banks, insurance and reinsurance companies, captive insurance managers, trading companies, ship owners or managers, fund managers and professionals to conduct their international business. The economic success achieved in the 1980s engendered the rapid growth of the financial services sector in Mauritius. The following types of offshore activities can be conducted in Mauritius:

- Offshore Banking
- Offshore Insurance
- Offshore Funds Management
- International Financial Services
- Operational Headquarters
- International Consultancy Services
- Shipping and Ship Management
- Aircraft Financing and Leasing
- International Licensing and Franchising
- International Data Processing and Information Technology Services
- Offshore Pension Funds
- International Trading
- International Assets Management

=== Information and communication technology ===
Since 2002, Mauritius has invested heavily into the development of a hub in information and communication technology (ICT). The contribution of the ICT sector accounts for 5.7% of the GDP. The ICT Sector employs 15,390 people.

=== Transport ===
Transportation in Mauritius is characterized by the network of roadways, ports, and airports. The island was originally only accessible by boat until 1922, when the first flight landed in Mauritius.

== Macroeconomic statistics ==
Exports of Mauritius by product category (2019) Chemical products Transportation Machines Mineral products Plastics and rubbers Metals Foodstuffs Precious metals Textiles Instruments Animal products Vegetable products Paper goods Footwear and headwear Miscellaneous Stone and glass Wood products Animal and vegetable bi-products Animal hides Arts and antiques Weapons

=== Main indicators ===
The following table shows the main economic indicators in 1980–2026. Inflation below 5% is in green.

Year	GDP			GDP growth (real)	Inflation	Government debt (% of GDP)
Year	Total (bil. US$ PPP)	Per capita (US$ PPP)	Total (bil. US$ nominal)	GDP growth (real)	Inflation	Government debt (% of GDP)
1980	1.9	2012	1.2	▼ -10.1	▲33.0	n/a
1985	▲3.2	▲3088	▼1.1	▲6.9	▲8.3	n/a
1990	▲5.3	▲5021	▲2.7	▲7.2	▲10.7	n/a
1995	▲7.6	▲6786	▲4.4	▲4.3	▲6.0	n/a
2000	▲10.9	▲9162	▲4.9	▲8.2	▲4.2	▲56.9
2005	▲14.3	▲11679	▲6.9	▲1.5	▲4.9	▲58.3
2006	▲15.5	▲12524	▲7.1	▲4.5	▲8.9	▼55.3
2007	▲16.8	▲13539	▲8.3	▲5.7	▲8.8	▼48.8
2008	▲18.0	▲14490	▲10.1	▲5.4	▲9.7	48.8
2009	▲18.7	▲15023	▼9.3	▲3.3	▲2.5	▲56.8
2010	▲19.8	▲15833	▲10.1	▲4.4	▲2.9	▼54.4
2011	▲21.0	▲16792	▲11.7	▲4.1	▲6.5	▲54.9
2012	▲22.2	▲17714	▲11.8	▲3.5	▲3.9	▼54.2
2013	▲23.3	▲18590	▲12.3	▲3.4	▲3.5	▲56.5
2014	▲24.6	▲19615	▲13.1	▲3.8	▲3.2	▲59.1
2015	▲25.8	▲20511	▼12.0	▲3.7	▲1.3	▲63
2016	▲27.0	▲21502	▲12.6	▲3.9	▲1.0	▼62.6
2017	▲28.6	▲22741	▲13.7	▲3.9	▲3.7	▼61.3
2018	▲29.2	▲23229	▲14.7	▲4.0	▲3.2	▲63.1
2019	▲30.4	▲24207	▼14.4	▲2.9	▲0.5	▲81.1
2020	▼27.0	▼21497	▼11.4	▼ -14.5	▲2.5	▲91.9
2021	▲28.8	▲22932	▲11.5	▲3.4	▲4.0	▼86.1
2022	▲33.5	▲26794	▲12.9	▲8.7	▲10.8	▼81.8
2023	▲36.5	▲29242	▲14.1	▲5.0	▲7.0	▼81.5
2024	▲39.3	▲31517	▲15.0	▲4.9	▲3.6	▲86.1
2025	▲41.6	▲33491	▲16.1	▲3.1	▲3.7	▲86.5
2026	▲44.3	▲35713	▲17.1	▲3.4	▲3.7	86.5

=== Other indicators ===
Household income or consumption by percentage share:

Distribution of family income – Gini index: 39 (2006 estimate)

Agriculture – products: sugarcane, tea, corn, potatoes, bananas, pulses; cattle, goats; fish

Industrial production growth rate: 8% (2000 estimate)

Electricity – production: 1,836 GWh (2002)

Electricity – consumption: 1,707 GWh (2002)

Oil – consumption: 21,000 bbl/d (3,300 m^{3}/d) (2003 estimate)
21,000 bbl/d (3,300 m^{3}/d) (2001 estimate)

Current account balance: $1,339 million (2011 estimate)
$799.4 million (2010 estimate)

Reserves of foreign exchange and gold: $2,797 billion (2012 estimate)
$2,601 billion (2010 estimate)

2013 Index of Economic Freedom rank: 8th

Exchange rates: Mauritian rupees per US dollar – 30.12 (26 March 2014), 30.99 (1 February 2010), 32.86 (2006), 29.14 (2005), 27.50 (2004), 27.90 (2003), 29.96 (2002), 29.13 (2001)

== Climate change and the economy ==
Mauritius faces significant environmental challenges such as flash floods and coastal erosion, which have substantial economic implications. In June 2024, the government announced plans to introduce a 2% climate levy on company profits to finance projects that combat climate change and restore the natural ecosystem. Companies with sales of less than 50 million rupees ($1.06 million) will be exempt from this levy. The proceeds from this corporate responsibility levy will be used to support national initiatives to protect, manage, invest in, and restore the country's natural ecosystem and combat the effects of climate change. The nation of 1.26 million people is experiencing more climate change-related events and needs to mobilize 300 billion rupees to meet its adaptation and mitigation goals.

In 2024, flash floods brought the capital, Port Louis, to a halt, causing significant disruptions in banking and market activities. Tourism, a crucial source of foreign currency for Mauritius, is expected to generate over $2 billion in earnings from visitors this year. However, more than 37 kilometres (23 mi) of the coastline have been affected by erosion, posing a threat to this vital industry. In response, the government has allocated 3.2 billion rupees to the new climate fund, which will be used to rehabilitate approximately 26 kilometres (16 mi) of shoreline and 30 degraded sites. For the fiscal year ending in June 2025, Mauritius' government expenditure is projected to rise by 17% to 237.3 billion rupees, with revenue expected to grow by 20% to 210.5 billion rupees. This will narrow the fiscal gap to 3.4% of GDP from 3.9% in 2024. Borrowing requirements will increase to 38 billion rupees from 30.7 billion rupees, including 14 billion rupees in foreign financing. Despite higher borrowing, public debt as a percentage of GDP is projected to decrease to 71.5% from 74.5% in 2024, though in absolute terms, it will rise to 567.49 billion rupees from 524.6 billion rupees. Additionally, a government-support agreement is expected to unlock over 15 billion rupees in private-sector investment in renewable energy projects, demonstrating the government's commitment to sustainable development and economic resilience.

== See also ==
- Board of Investment (Mauritius)
- Bank of Mauritius (central bank)
- Mineral industry of Mauritius
- United Nations Economic Commission for Africa
