= Stock Exchange of Mauritius =

Stock exchange in Port Louis, Mauritius

- Bourse de Maurice
- Type: Stock exchange
- Location: Port Louis, Mauritius
- Coordinates: -20.165214979766127, 57.50563150614958
- Founded: 1989
- Owner: Privately Owned
- Key people: Chairman • Shivraj (Kevin) Rangasami; Deputy Chairman • Gianduth (Alvin) Jeeawock; Director & Chief Executive • Sunil Benimadhu
- Currency: Mauritian rupee
- No. of listings: 185+
- Market cap: US$5.9 billion
- Indices: SEMDEX; SEMTRI; SEM-7; DEMEX; DEMTRI
- Website: Stock Exchange of Mauritius

The Stock Exchange of Mauritius (SEM; French: Bourse de Maurice); is an organization responsible for the operation of Mauritius's primary stock exchange located at Port Louis. The SEM operates two markets: the Official Market and the Development & Enterprise Market (DEM). There are 40 companies listed on the Official Market representing a Market Capitalization of nearly US$5.3 billion, the DEM presently has 48 companies listed with a market capitalisation of nearly US$1.5 billion as at 31 July 2012. SEM is one of the leading Exchanges in Africa and a member of the World Federation of Exchanges.

== Overview ==
The SEM operates two primary markets: the Official Market and the Development & Enterprise Market (DEM). As of May 2026, the Official Market lists 63 securities with a total market capitalisation of approximately Rs 362.8 billion.

The Official Market maintains five indices: the SEMDEX (all-share index, base date 5 July 1989), the SEMTRI (total return variant), the SEM-7 (blue-chip index of the seven largest constituents), and the DEMEX and DEMTRI for the Development & Enterprise Market.

== History ==
The Stock Exchange Act 1988 established a small but thriving exchange which is run by the Stock Exchange of Mauritius Ltd (SEM), a private limited company. The act also established the Stock Exchange Commission (SEC), which controls and supervises stock exchange operations. Two markets operated: the Official List and the Over-The-Counter Market (for unlisted shares). There are around 40 companies listed on the Official List, and around eighty companies quoted in the Over-The-Counter Market. 10 companies are quoted for their debentures. The exchange has classified these companies into seven categories, namely: banks and insurance, industry, investments, sugar, commerce, leisure and hotels and transport. There are also two dual listed funds quoted both on the London Stock Exchange and the Stock Exchange of Mauritius.

The SEMDEX - the all shares index - reflects capitalisation based on each listed stock which is weighted according to its shares in the total market. In its computation, the current value of SEMDEX is expressed in relation to a base period, which was chosen as of July 5, 1989, with an index value of 100.

Trading takes place five days a week and is conducted through an open outcry, order-driven and single-price auction system. Each share (excluding foreign shares) has a maximum +/- 20% price limit per trading session. A maximum of 1.25% trading fees are applicable to transactions on the market. There is no tax on dividends (apart from Solidarity Levy for certain Mauritian residents) or capital gains.

Major developments took place through the establishment of a new electronic clearing and settlement system and the introduction of daily trading (at the end of 1997). Future planned developments include the introduction of a new electronic trading system and the listing of new financial products on the stock market. The SEM was recently promoted from the status of corresponding exchange to that of affiliated securities markets within the Fedération Internationale des Bourses de Valeurs (FIBV) and it is also a founding member of the African Stock Exchange Association (ASEA).

The SEM was opened to foreign investors in 1994 following the abolition of exchange controls. Foreign investors do not need approval to trade shares, unless the investment is for the purpose of legal or management control of a Mauritian company. The only restriction is that foreign investors cannot have an individual holding of more than 15% in a sugar company. There is no control on currency repatriation, and the currencies are fully convertible and market determined. Settlements can be made in a foreign currency and foreign currency accounts can be opened in Mauritius. There are no capital gains taxes and no withholding tax on dividends procured from trading in officially listed companies.

A major development of 1998 was the implementation of a central depository system, in which all listed companies are registered. This system allows delivery versus payment (DVP) on a T+3 day rotating basis. The establishment of a clearinghouse, through the Bank of Mauritius, provided for a guarantee fund, which incorporates measures for securities and fund settlement failure. The exchange, in collaboration with international advisers, drafted new listing and reporting rules to ensure greater transparency for investors. These rules came into force during the first half of 1998.

== See also ==
- Futures exchange
- Economy of Mauritius
- List of companies of Mauritius
- List of African stock exchanges
- List of stock exchanges
