= Outline of Mauritius =

Island nation in the southwest Indian Ocean

The Flag of Mauritius

The Coat of arms of Mauritius

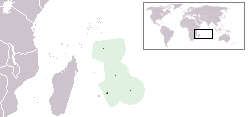
The location of Mauritius

The following outline is provided as an overview of and topical guide to Mauritius:

Mauritius – sovereign island nation located in the southwest Indian Ocean about 900 kilometres (560 mi) east of Madagascar. In addition to the Island of Mauritius, the republic includes the islands of St. Brandon, Rodrigues and the Agaléga Islands. Mauritius is part of the Mascarene Islands, with the French island of Réunion 200 km (125 mi) to the southwest and the island of Rodrigues 570 km to the northeast.

== General reference ==
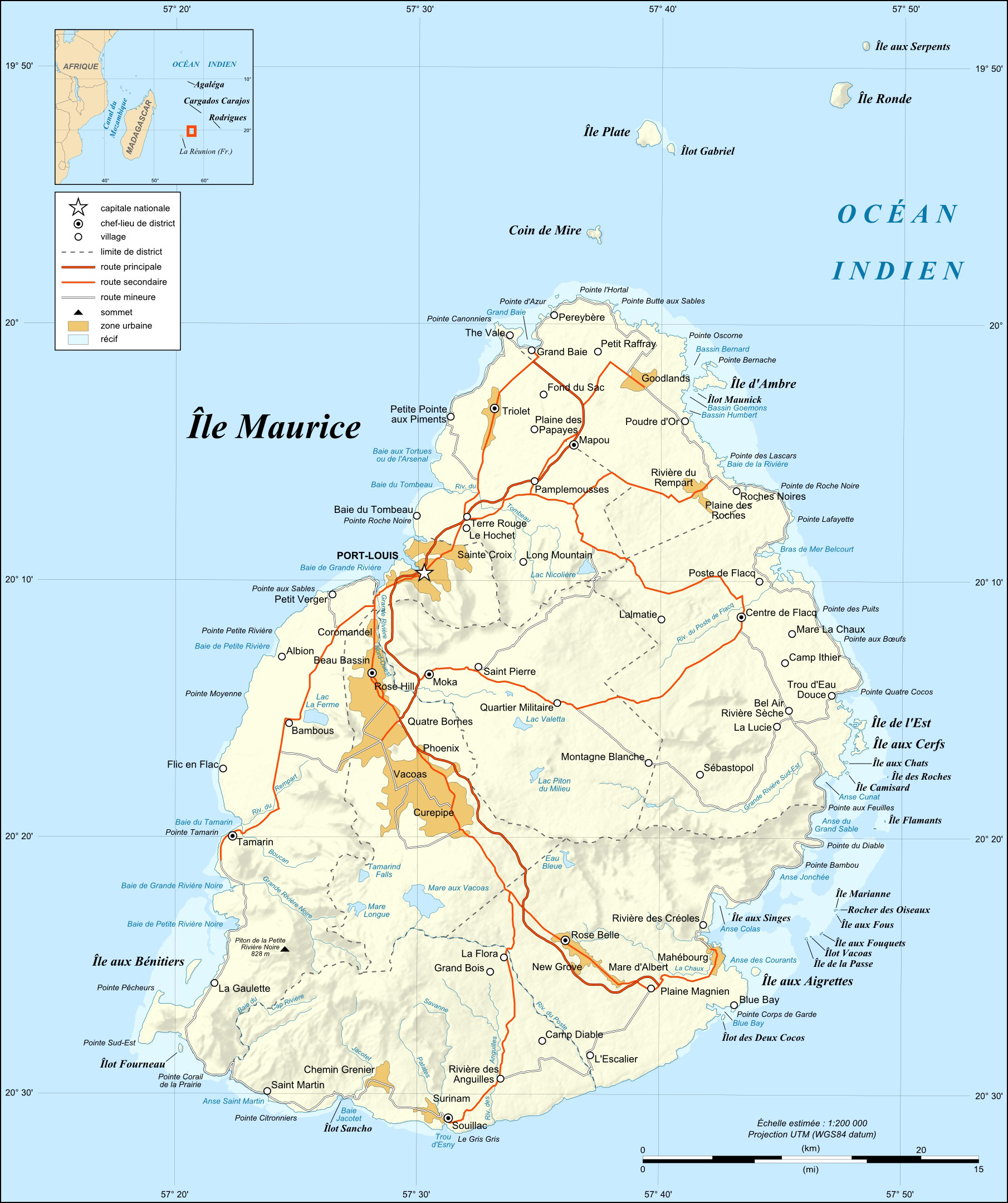
An enlargeable basic map of Mauritius

- Pronunciation:
  - English: /məˈrɪʃəs/ mər-ISH-əs or /məˈrɪʃiəs/ mər-ISH-ee-əs
  - French: [mɔʁis] or [moʁis]
- Common English country name: Mauritius
- Official English country name: The Republic of Mauritius
- Official endonym (s): Mauritius (English), Maurice (French)
- Common endonym (s): Île Maurice (French), Moris (Mauritian Creole), मॉरिशस (Hindi)
- Adjectival(s): Mauritian
- Demonym(s): Mauritian
- Etymology: Maurice, Prince of Orange
- International rankings of Mauritius
- ISO country codes: MU, MUS, 480
- ISO region codes: See ISO 3166-2:MU
- Internet country code top-level domain: .mu

== Geography of Mauritius ==
An enlargeable topographic map of Mauritius

- Mauritius is: an island country
- Location:
  - Eastern Hemisphere and Southern Hemisphere
  - Africa (off its east coast, east of Madagascar)
    - East Africa
    - Southern Africa
  - Indian Ocean
  - Time zone: Mauritius Time (UTC+04)
  - Extreme points of Mauritius
    - High: Piton de la Petite Rivière Noire 828 m (2,717 ft)
    - Low: Indian Ocean 0 m
  - Land boundaries: none
  - Coastline: Indian Ocean 177 km
- Population of Mauritius: 1,262,000 – 151st most populous country
- Area of Mauritius: 2,040 km^{2}
- Atlas of Mauritius

=== Environment of Mauritius ===
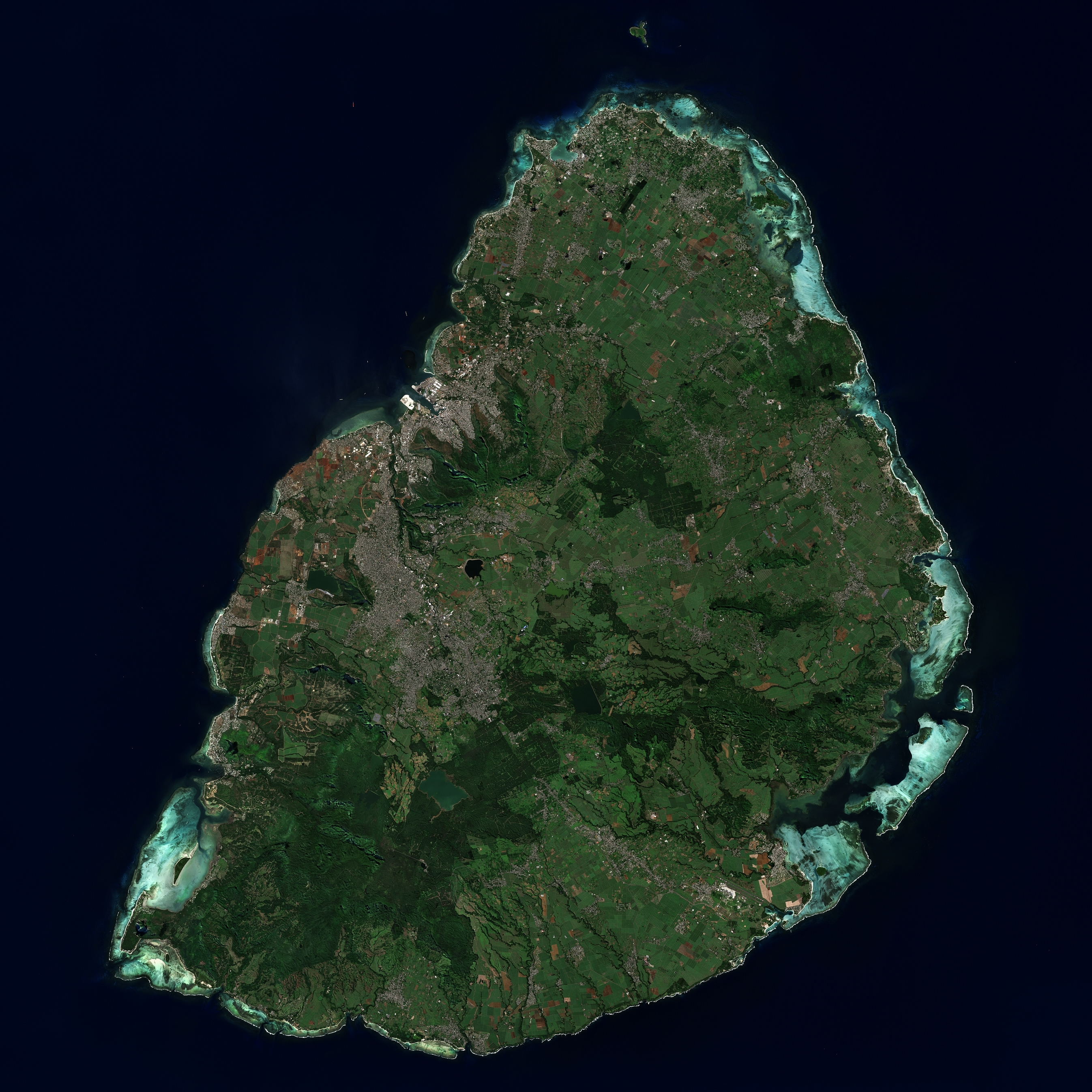
An enlargeable satellite image of Mauritius

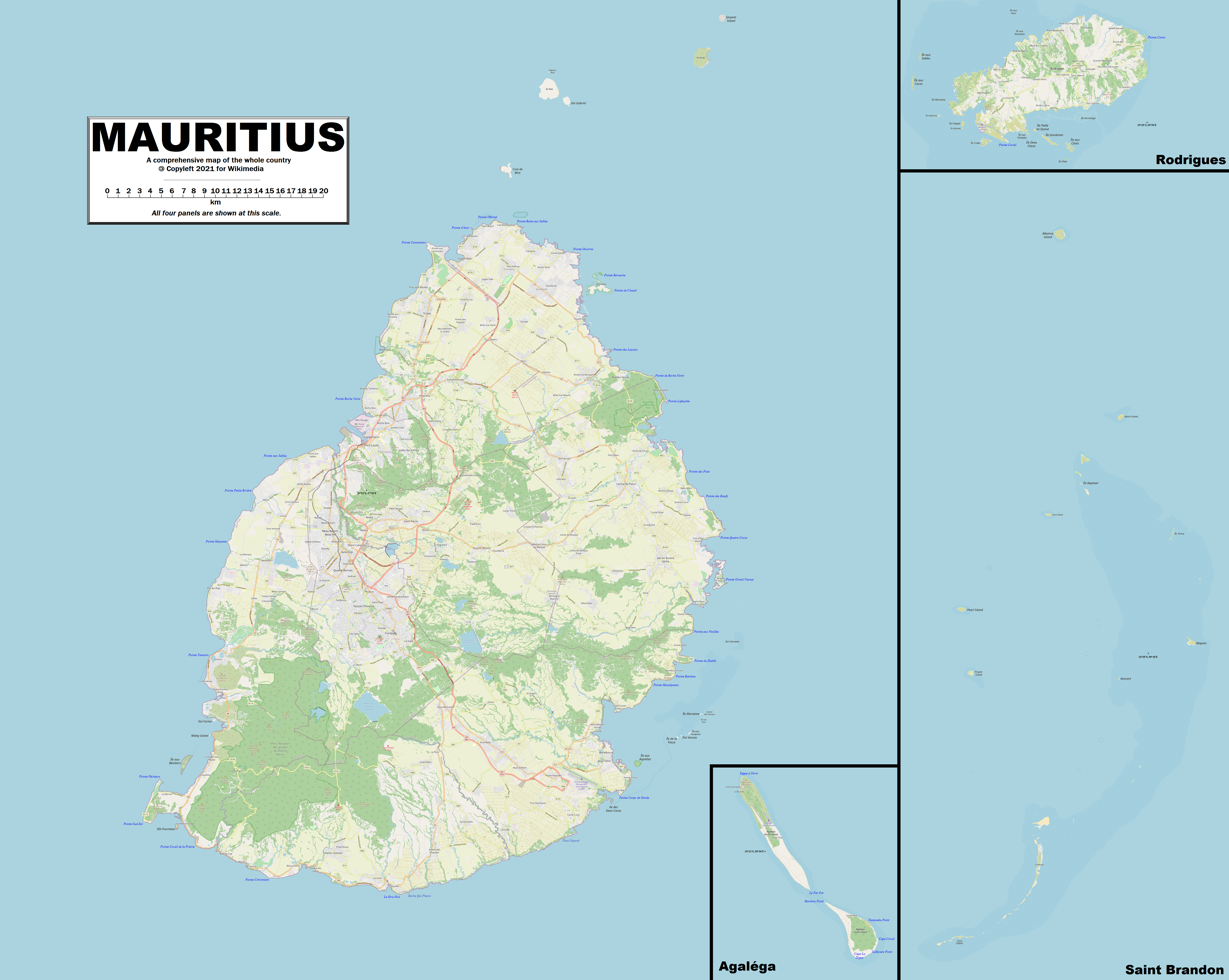
An enlargeable, highly detailed map of Mauritius, including the country's outlying islands

- Climate of Mauritius
- Protected areas of Mauritius
  - National parks of Mauritius
- Wildlife of Mauritius
  - Fauna of Mauritius
    - Birds of Mauritius
    - Mammals of Mauritius

==== Natural geographic features of Mauritius ====
- Glaciers in Mauritius: none
- Rivers of Mauritius
- World Heritage Sites in Mauritius
  - Aapravasi Ghat
  - Le Morne Brabant

=== Regions of Mauritius ===
Regions of Mauritius

==== Ecoregions of Mauritius ====
List of ecoregions in Mauritius

==== Administrative divisions of Mauritius ====
===== Districts of Mauritius =====
- Black River
- Flacq
- Grand Port
- Moka
- Pamplemousses
- Plaines Wilhems
- Port Louis
- Rivière du Rempart
- Savanne

===== Towns of Mauritius =====
- Beau-Bassin Rose-Hill
- Curepipe
- Port Louis: Capital of Mauritius
- Quatre Bornes
- Vacoas-Phoenix

=== Demography of Mauritius ===
Demographics of Mauritius

== Government and politics of Mauritius ==
Politics of Mauritius

- Form of government:
- Capital of Mauritius: Port Louis
- Elections in Mauritius
- Political parties in Mauritius

=== Branches of the government of Mauritius ===
Government of Mauritius

==== Executive branch of the government of Mauritius ====
- Head of state: President of Mauritius, Dharam Gokhool
- Head of government: Prime Minister of Mauritius, Navin Ramgoolam
  - Vice Prime Minister of Mauritius
- Cabinet of Mauritius

==== Legislative branch of the government of Mauritius ====
- Parliament of Mauritius (unicameral)

==== Judicial branch of the government of Mauritius ====
Court system of Mauritius

- Supreme Court of Mauritius

=== Foreign relations of Mauritius ===
Foreign relations of Mauritius

- Diplomatic missions in Mauritius
- Diplomatic missions of Mauritius

==== International organization membership ====
The Republic of Mauritius is a member of:

- African, Caribbean, and Pacific Group of States (ACP)
- African Development Bank Group (AfDB)
- African Union (AU)
- Common Market for Eastern and Southern Africa (COMESA)
- Commonwealth of Nations
- Community of Portuguese Language Countries (CPLP) (associate)
- Food and Agriculture Organization (FAO)
- Group of 77 (G77)
- Indian Ocean Commission (InOC)
- International Atomic Energy Agency (IAEA)
- International Bank for Reconstruction and Development (IBRD)
- International Civil Aviation Organization (ICAO)
- International Criminal Court (ICCt)
- International Criminal Police Organization (Interpol)
- International Development Association (IDA)
- International Federation of Red Cross and Red Crescent Societies (IFRCS)
- International Finance Corporation (IFC)
- International Fund for Agricultural Development (IFAD)
- International Hydrographic Organization (IHO)
- International Labour Organization (ILO)
- International Maritime Organization (IMO)
- International Mobile Satellite Organization (IMSO)
- International Monetary Fund (IMF)
- International Olympic Committee (IOC)
- International Organization for Migration (IOM)
- International Organization for Standardization (ISO)
- International Red Cross and Red Crescent Movement (ICRM)
- International Telecommunication Union (ITU)
- International Telecommunications Satellite Organization (ITSO)
- International Trade Union Confederation (ITUC)
- Inter-Parliamentary Union (IPU)
- Multilateral Investment Guarantee Agency (MIGA)
- Nonaligned Movement (NAM)
- Organisation internationale de la Francophonie (OIF)
- Organisation for the Prohibition of Chemical Weapons (OPCW)
- Permanent Court of Arbitration (PCA)
- South Asian Association for Regional Cooperation (SAARC) (observer)
- Southern African Development Community (SADC)
- United Nations (UN)
- United Nations Conference on Trade and Development (UNCTAD)
- United Nations Educational, Scientific, and Cultural Organization (UNESCO)
- United Nations Industrial Development Organization (UNIDO)
- Universal Postal Union (UPU)
- World Confederation of Labour (WCL)
- World Customs Organization (WCO)
- World Federation of Trade Unions (WFTU)
- World Health Organization (WHO)
- World Intellectual Property Organization (WIPO)
- World Meteorological Organization (WMO)
- World Tourism Organization (UNWTO)
- World Trade Organization (WTO)

=== Law and order in Mauritius ===
Law of Mauritius

- Constitution of Mauritius
- Crime in Mauritius
- Human rights in Mauritius
  - LGBT rights in Mauritius
- Law enforcement in Mauritius
  - Mauritius Police Force

=== Military of Mauritius ===
Military of Mauritius

- Command
  - Commander-in-chief:
- Forces
  - Army of Mauritius

=== Local government in Mauritius ===
Local government in Mauritius

== History of Mauritius ==
History of Mauritius

- Current events of Mauritius

== Culture of Mauritius ==
Culture of Mauritius

- Cuisine of Mauritius
- Languages of Mauritius
- Media of Mauritius
- National symbols of Mauritius
  - Coat of arms of Mauritius
  - Flag of Mauritius
  - National anthem of Mauritius
- Newspapers in Mauritius
  - L'Express
  - Le Mauricien
- Prostitution in Mauritius
- Public holidays in Mauritius
- Religion in Mauritius
  - Christianity in Mauritius
  - Hinduism in Mauritius
  - Islam in Mauritius
  - Judaism in Mauritius
- World Heritage Sites in Mauritius

=== Art in Mauritius ===
- Since 2009 there is an Opera Festival in Mauritius

Opera Mauritius and The Friends,

- Literature of Mauritius
- Music of Mauritius

=== Sports in Mauritius ===
Sports in Mauritius

- Football in Mauritius
- Mauritius at the Olympics

== Economy and infrastructure of Mauritius ==
Economy of Mauritius

- Economic rank, by nominal GDP (2007): 130th (one hundred and thirtieth)
- Communications in Mauritius
  - Internet in Mauritius
- Companies of Mauritius
- Currency of Mauritius: Rupee
  - ISO 4217: MUR
- Health care in Mauritius
- Mining in Mauritius
- Mauritius Stock Exchange
- Sugar industry of Mauritius
- Tourism in Mauritius
  - Mauritius Tourism Promotion Authority
  - Visa policy of Mauritius
- Transport in Mauritius
  - Airports in Mauritius
  - Rail transport in Mauritius

== Education in Mauritius ==
Education in Mauritius

== See also ==
Mauritius

- List of international rankings
- List of Mauritius-related topics
- Member state of the Commonwealth of Nations
- Member state of the United Nations
- Outline of Africa
