= Bank of Mauritius Tower =

Skyscraper in Port Louis, Mauritius

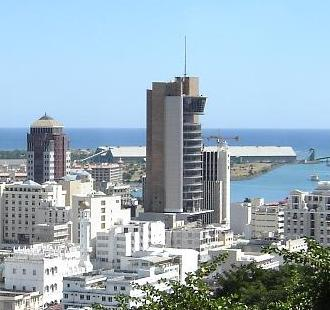
- The Bank of Mauritius Building
- Interactive map of the Bank of Mauritius Tower area

Record height
- Preceded by: Mauritius Telecom Tower

General information
- Type: Commercial (office)
- Architectural style: Modern
- Location: Port Louis, Mauritius
- Coordinates: 20.1618405°S 57.5037520°E
- Construction started: 2004
- Completed: 2006

Height
- Architectural: 124 m (407 ft)
- Tip: 124 m (407 ft)
- Roof: 98 m (322 ft)

Technical details
- Material: Concrete
- Floor count: 22
- Floor area: 16,834 m^{2} (181,200 ft^{2})

The Bank of Mauritius Tower (also known as Bank of Mauritius Building or Bank of Mauritius Headquarters) is a skyscraper in Port Louis, the capital of Mauritius, and a home to the Bank of Mauritius. It is the tallest building of the country. When measured to roof, it stands at 98 m (321 ft) and to pinnacle at 124 m (407 ft). The 16,834 m² reinforced concrete structure reached its final height in May 2006. A 22-storey building, it towers over the Citadel (a hill-top fortification in Port Louis) and is constructed in an area where high-rises were once prohibited. It is also the second tallest structure in Mauritius after the much taller 183 m (600 ft) Bigara Station Transmitter, a guyed mast in the upper Plaines Wilhems.

Its construction took nearly 30 months. It is resistant to seasonal hurricanes and, owing to its function, it is among the most technically advanced buildings in Mauritius.

Other tall buildings in Mauritius are the Telecom Tower with its twin lightning rods pointing at 101 m, the 82 m State Bank Tower and the Air Mauritius Centre with a helipad at 79 m. Outside Port Louis, the Ebene Cyber Tower is 72 m tall. Malherbes Station Transmitter, a guyed mast in Curepipe, is 97 m tall.

== Gallery ==
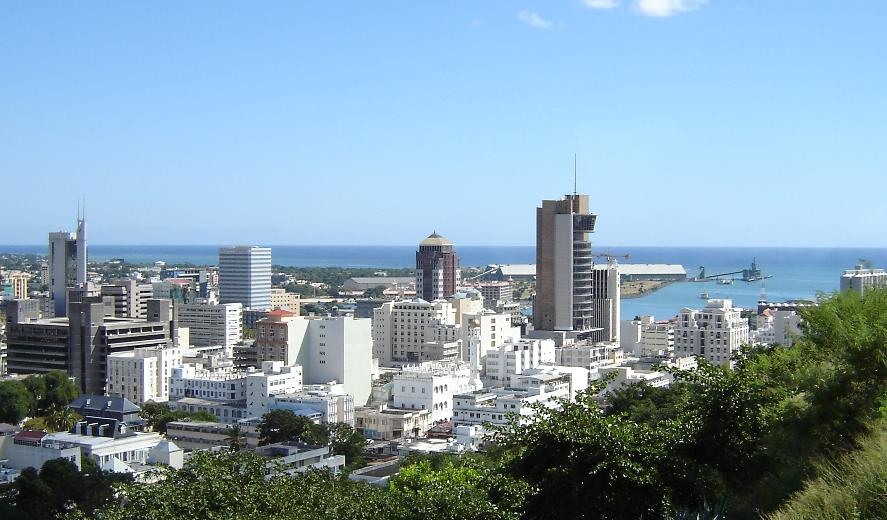
The Bank of Mauritius Tower dominates the Port Louis skyline (right).

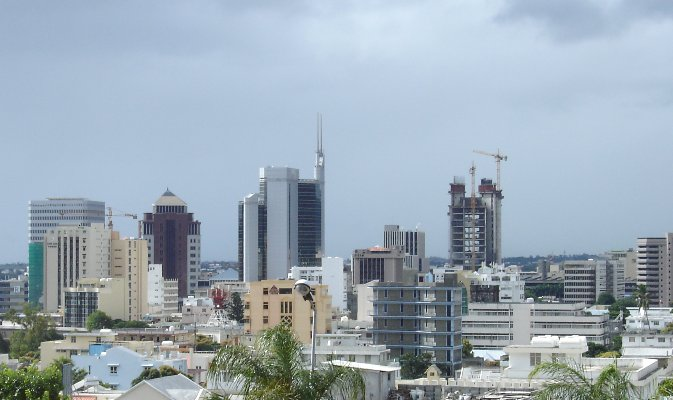
The Bank of Mauritius Tower during construction in July 2005

== Notes and references ==
- SAMINADEN, Stéphane (25 February 2006). "La sécurité, priorité des futurs locaux de la Banque de Maurice". L'express (Mauritius) (in French). La Sentinelle. Archived from the original on 27 September 2007.
- Le Mauricien (21 January 2006)
