= Telecommunications in Mauritius =

Telecommunications had an early beginning in Mauritius, with the first telephone line installed in 1883, seven years after the invention of the telephone. Over the years, the network and telephony improved. By the late 20th century, the rapid development and convergence of information and telecommunications technologies gave rise to an ICT industry on the island along with many incentives provided by the government. The government thus aims to make the ICT sector the 5th pillar of the Mauritian economy and Mauritius a Cyber Island. Historically, the country is known for tourism, rather than its call centers and business process outsourcing.

== History ==
In 1883, basic telephony was introduced in Mauritius, only seven years after the invention of the telephone. The first telephone line was set up between the Colony Governor's residence in Reduit and Government House in Port Louis. The telephone network was maintained by the Electricity and Telephone Department till 1956. From that date, the telecommunications department took that responsibility.

In 1893, Mauritius was linked to Seychelles (then part of Mauritius) and Zanzibar via a submarine telegraphic cable followed by Rodrigues in 1901 by the Eastern and South African Telegraph Company. The transmission rate of the telegraphic service was 15 words per minute, a historical revolution in those days.

Before the independence of the country and till 1985, international communications were managed by Cable & Wireless, a private British company. From 1985, Overseas Telecommunications Services, which subsequently became Mauritius Telecom Limited took over.

The Central Information Systems Division (CISD), formerly known as Data Processing Division (DPD), was created in 1971. The CISD nowadays is responsible for government payroll IT systems, government email, maintenance of all government/departmental websites and technical support.

In 1987, a second standard B earth station and a domestic satellite network were installed with Rodrigues and the Outer Islands. That same year, an X.25 Packet Switched data exchange was also installed.

In July 1988, the state-owned Department of Telecommunications was privatised to become the Mauritius Telecommunications Services (MTS). With privatisation, national and international activities were merged to form Mauritius Telecom Ltd.

The 1988 Telecommunications Act established the legal framework to cater for telecom services in a state-owned monopoly.

The National Computer Board (NCB) was also set up in 1988 by the National Board Act (No 43) to advise the Government on the formulation of national policies for the development of the IT sector and promote an IT culture in the country.

In 1989, the Central Informatics Bureau (CIB) was created whose main functions were to plan and coordinate computerization within the Civil Service.

The State Informatics Limited was also set up in 1989 initially to help in the computerization of the Civil Service.

in 1992, the Prime Minister of Mauritius said that he was firmly opposed to opening the hertzian waves to foreign television, and that his government "would not accord this liberty to foreigners".

By 1997, the Ministry of Information and Telecommunications was created to formulate and implement policies regarding the development of the ICT sector. The CISD and CIB became departments within this new ministry.

However, following the General Agreement on Trade in Services (GATS) at the WTO, the 1988 Telecommunications Act was replaced with by the Telecommunications Act of 1998 which provided the legal framework to enable the emergence of a free and democratised telecommunications market on the island. This act also created the Mauritius Telecommunications Authority (MTA) as a regulatory body for the telecommunications sector.

With the development of Information and Communications Technologies, the Telecommunications Act of 1998 was replaced by the Information and Communication Technologies Act of 2001. The MTA was subsequently replaced by the Information and Communication Technologies Authority (ICTA). In 2007, the Information and Communication Technologies Authority directed internet service providers to block access to Facebook. In 2009, the Information and Communication Technologies Authority rejected an application from Outremer Telecom for a cellular telephony licence. In 2014, the Commercial Division of the Supreme Court ordered Data Communication Ltd to pay to the Information and Communication Technologies Authority the sum of Rs 20,672,135.80 inclusive of surcharges for late payment, with costs.

== General statistics ==
Telephones - main lines in use: 36.8 per 100 inhabitants (2023)

Telephones - mobile cellular: 2,104,700 (2023)

Telephone system: small system with good service
domestic: primarily microwave radio relay trunk system
international: country code - 230; satellite earth station - 1 Intelsat (Indian Ocean); new microwave link to Reunion; HF radiotelephone links to several countries; fiber optic submarine cable (SAT-3/WASC/SAFE) provides connectivity to Europe and Asia

Radio broadcast stations: AM 4, FM 9, shortwave 0 (2002)

Radios: 420,000 (1997)

Television broadcast stations: 1 (plus several repeaters) (1997)

Televisions: 258,000 (1997)

Internet Service Providers (ISPs): 11 (2023)

Internet users: 1,934,000 (2023)

Country code (Top level domain): MU

== Television ==
Television broadcast stations: Only one state-controlled station, Mauritius Broadcasting Corporation, as the government refuses to issue licences to domestic broadcasters.

== Mobile networks ==
Mauritius has three operators; Mauritius Telecom, Mahanagar Telephone Mauritius Limited (MTML) & Emtel. Each operator uses a different technology to provide Internet access. MTML uses CDMA2000 and Emtel uses HSDPA (3.5G).

Emtel sued Mauritius Telecom, the Ministry of Information Technology, Communication and Innovation, and the Information and Communication Technologies Authority in 1997. The lawsuit was settled in 2025 with Mauritius Telecom and the Information and Communication Technologies Authority each agreeing to pay $8,673,340 to Emtel.

== Internet ==
The monopoly is retained by Mauritius Telecom (MT) which provides Fibre to the Home services.

=== Internet censorship and surveillance ===
In 2007, the government took down Facebook for a day. There is a National Cyber Security Strategy for the government to set up a comprehensive framework to monitor Internet traffic which might be harmful to the nation and society. in 2016, a couple was arrested after sharing a post about the Minister of Housing and Lands on Facebook. In September 2016, the Internet filtering and Public Key Infrastructure servers operated by the Information and Communication Technologies Authority were seized by the National Security Service. It was claimed that the Indian Research and Analysis Wing attempted to intercept Internet traffic at a cable landing station in Mauritius. The Minister of Information and Communication Technologies stated that it was not feasible as the laptop would explode because of the volume of data. In 2024, Mauritius' Information and Communication Technologies Authority directed Internet service providers to block social media 2024 Mauritian social media ban.
