= Mass media in Mauritius =

The mass media in Mauritius is limited by its small population size (estimated at 1,288,000 in 2008). There are a few media outlets, including print newspapers, radio and state-run television stations.

== Newspapers ==
Publications appear in French and sometimes English, while others are in an ancestral language.

=== Press freedom ===
Section 12(1) of the Constitution of Mauritius provides for the presumption of freedom of speech. Section 287 and 287A of the Criminal Code allow a court to ban newspapers for sedition. Section 299 of the Criminal Code makes "publishing false news" a crime. The Newspaper and Periodicals Act was enacted in 1837. In 1984, a Newspapers and Periodicals Bill was proposed to make it mandatory for newspapers to deposit a financial bond of MUR500,000 to be allowed to continue to operate. The bill was opposed by the media. Forty-four journalists were arrested for protesting against the bill. In January 2015, a court sentenced the then Vice-Prime Minister to a meager monetary fine for having led an illegal demonstration in front of a daily newspaper and damaged some window panes of the building.

In June 2016, the speaker of the National Assembly banned the editor-in-chief of a news magazine from the National Assembly for four sessions because of an editorial about Hanoomanjee’s alleged bias in the National Assembly.

== Television ==
The Mauritius Broadcasting Corporation is the national public television and radio broadcaster. It broadcasts programming in French, English, Hindi, Creole, and Chinese. It also operates on the islands of Rodrigues and Agaléga. Other television broadcasters include Canalsat, Parabole Maurice (until 2025) and DStv.

== Radio ==
There are nine Mauritian FM radio stations and two operating on the AM band. The popular stations are Radio Plus and Top FM.

== Telecommunications ==
The principal service provider is the public entity Mauritius Telecom together with its strategic partner Orange S.A. Other service providers include Emtel and MTML.

== Internet ==
Mauritius has several operators like Mauritius Telecom, Mahanagar Telephone Mauritius Limited (MTML) & Emtel. Each operator uses a different technology to provide Internet access. Emtel uses HSDPA(3.5G). The monopoly is retained by Mauritius Telecom (MT) which provides dial-up & ADSL services over existing telephone lines. High-quality internet access is also widely available in Mauritius.

== See also ==
- Mass media
- Media of Africa

== Bibliography ==
- "Mauritius: Directory: the Press". Africa South of the Sahara 2004. Regional Surveys of the World. Europa Publications. 2004. ISBN 1857431839. (Includes broadcasting)
