= Mauritia (disambiguation) =

Mauritia may refer to:

- Mauritia, a genus of fan palms
- Mauritia (gastropod), a genus of snails
- Mauritia (microcontinent), a proposed land mass that existed between India and Madagascar

== See also ==
- Mauritian (disambiguation)
- Mauritius
