= Mahanagar Telephone Mauritius Limited =

- Type: Subsidiary
- Industry: Telecommunications
- Founded: 14 November 2003
- Headquarters: Ebene, Mauritius
- Key people: Alok Agrawal, ITS (Chief Executive Officer)
- Products: Mobile telephony Wired and wireless broadband Fixed line telephony Landline; Internet services
- Owner: Ministry of Communications, Government of India
- Parent: Mahanagar Telephone Nigam Limited
- Website: https://chili.mu

Mahanagar Telephone Mauritius Limited (MTML) (transl. Metropolitan Telephone Mauritius Limited) is a telecommunications and Internet services company based in Ebene, Mauritius primarily under the ChiLi brand. It was founded in 2003 by Mahanagar Telephone Nigam Limited

== History ==
Founded in 2003 by Mahanagar Telephone Nigam Limited of India, it obtained the necessary licenses to operate in Mauritius from the ICTA in January 2004. MTML has, since 2005, operated ILD & CDMA based basic services.

144,312 telephone connections are operational from a total switching capacity of 200,000.

MTML began offering Internet access through its Wireless network to its users in February 2007.

== Services ==
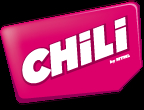
"CHiLi" Logo

- - Fixed Wireless Telephone
- - CDMA Mobile Service under brand name "MOKOZE MOBILE"
- - International Direct Dialing by Calling Cards
- - Dial-Up Internet through Fixed Wireless Phones under brand name "MTML INTERNET EXPRESS SERVICE".
- - Broadband Internet service through EVDO mobile broadband modem and USB card / PC Card under the brand name "MTML AZU Broadband"
- - GSM/3G Mobile Service under brand name "CHILI GSM"

== See also ==
- Communications in Mauritius
