= Mauritius Telecom Tower =

Building in Port Louis, Mauritius

- Interactive map of the Mauritius Telecom Tower area

General information
- Status: Completed
- Type: Commercial
- Location: Port Louis, Mauritius

Height
- Tip: 331 ft (101 m)
- Roof: 288 ft (88 m)

Technical details
- Floor count: 19

Mauritius Telecom Tower is a skyscraper in Port Louis, Mauritius. The 19 story building is currently the second tallest building in Mauritius and houses the headquarters of Mauritius Telecom. It has a height of 88 m but is 101 m tall when measured to its two lightning rods.

== See also ==
- Skyscraper design and construction
- List of tallest buildings in Africa
