= List of mammals of Mauritius =

This is a list of the mammal species recorded in Mauritius. Of the mammal species in Mauritius, one is critically endangered, three are vulnerable, and one is considered to be extinct.

The following tags are used to highlight each species' conservation status as assessed by the International Union for Conservation of Nature:

EX	Extinct	No reasonable doubt that the last individual has died.
EW	Extinct in the wild	Known only to survive in captivity or as a naturalized populations well outside its previous range.
CR	Critically endangered	The species is in imminent risk of extinction in the wild.
EN	Endangered	The species is facing an extremely high risk of extinction in the wild.
VU	Vulnerable	The species is facing a high risk of extinction in the wild.
NT	Near threatened	The species does not meet any of the criteria that would categorise it as risking extinction but it is likely to do so in the future.
LC	Least concern	There are no current identifiable risks to the species.
DD	Data deficient	There is inadequate information to make an assessment of the risks to this species.

Some species were assessed using an earlier set of criteria. Species assessed using this system have the following instead of near threatened and least concern categories:

LR/cd	Lower risk/conservation dependent	Species which were the focus of conservation programmes and may have moved into a higher risk category if that programme was discontinued.
LR/nt	Lower risk/near threatened	Species which are close to being classified as vulnerable but are not the subject of conservation programmes.
LR/lc	Lower risk/least concern	Species for which there are no identifiable risks.

== Order: Sirenia (manatees and dugongs) ==
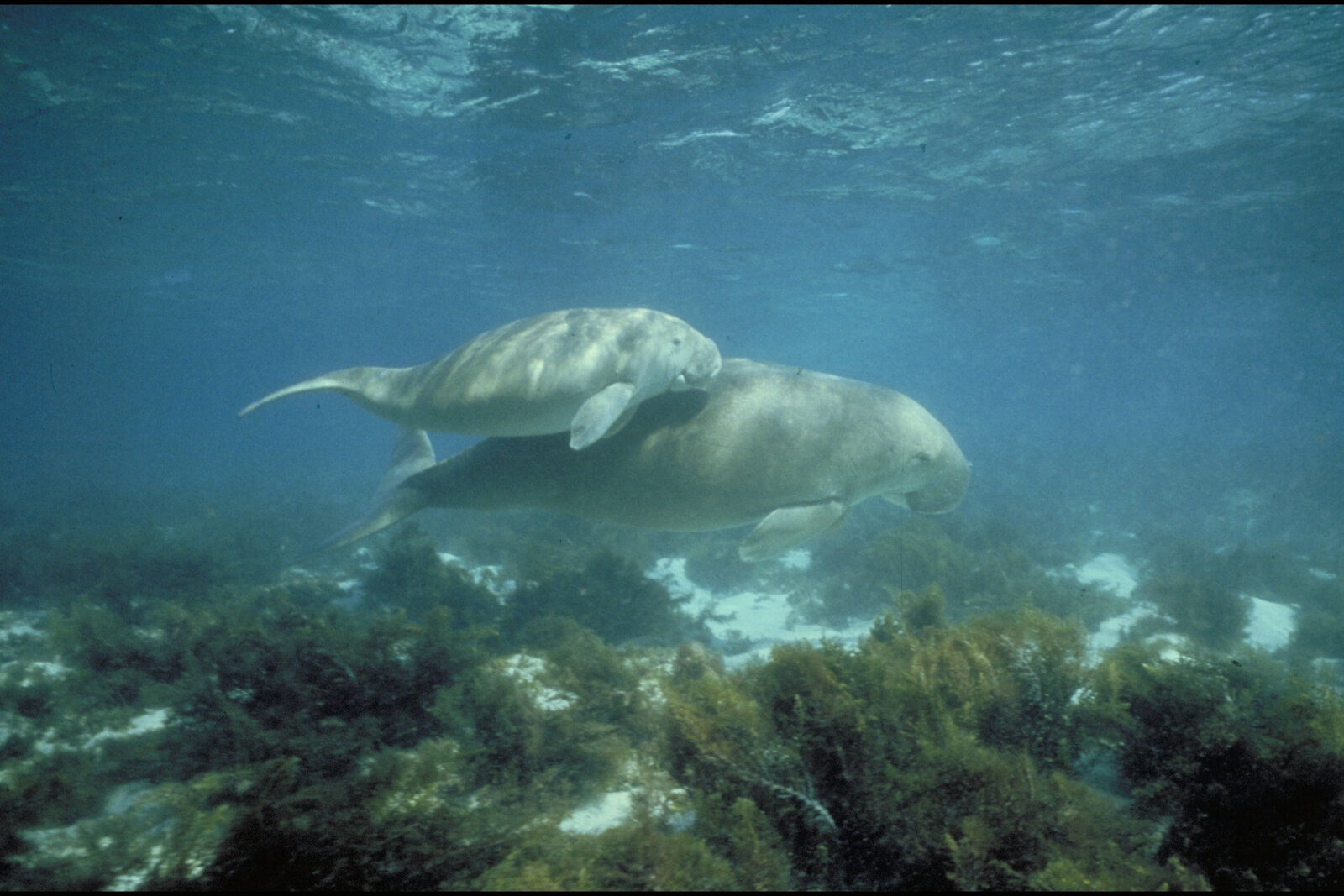
Dugongs

Sirenia is an order of fully aquatic, herbivorous mammals that inhabit rivers, estuaries, coastal marine waters, swamps, and marine wetlands. All four species are endangered.

- Family: Dugongidae
  - Genus: Dugong
    - Dugong, D. dugon VU

== Order: Chiroptera (bats) ==
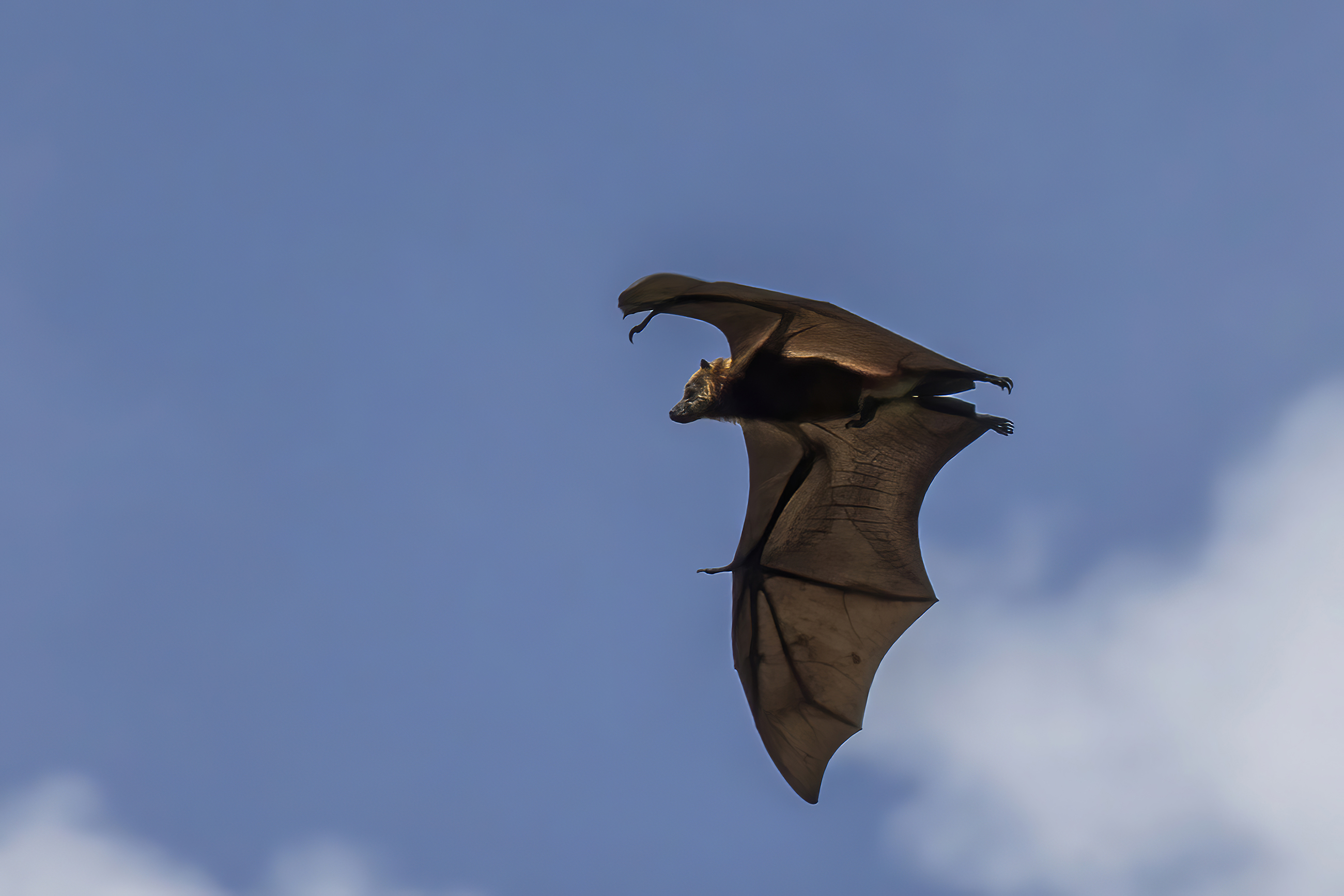
Mauritian flying fox

The bats' most distinguishing feature is that their forelimbs are developed as wings, making them the only mammals capable of flight. Bat species account for about 20% of all mammals.

  - Family: Pteropodidae (flying foxes, Old World fruit bats)
    - Subfamily: Pteropodinae
      - Genus: Pteropus
        - Mauritian flying fox, P. niger EN
        - Rodrigues flying fox, P. rodricensis EN
        - Small Mauritian flying fox, P. subniger EX
  - Family: Molossidae
    - Genus: Mormopterus
      - Natal free-tailed bat, M. acetabulosus EN
  - Family: Emballonuridae
    - Genus: Taphozous
      - Mauritian tomb bat, T. mauritianus LC

== Order: Cetacea (whales) ==
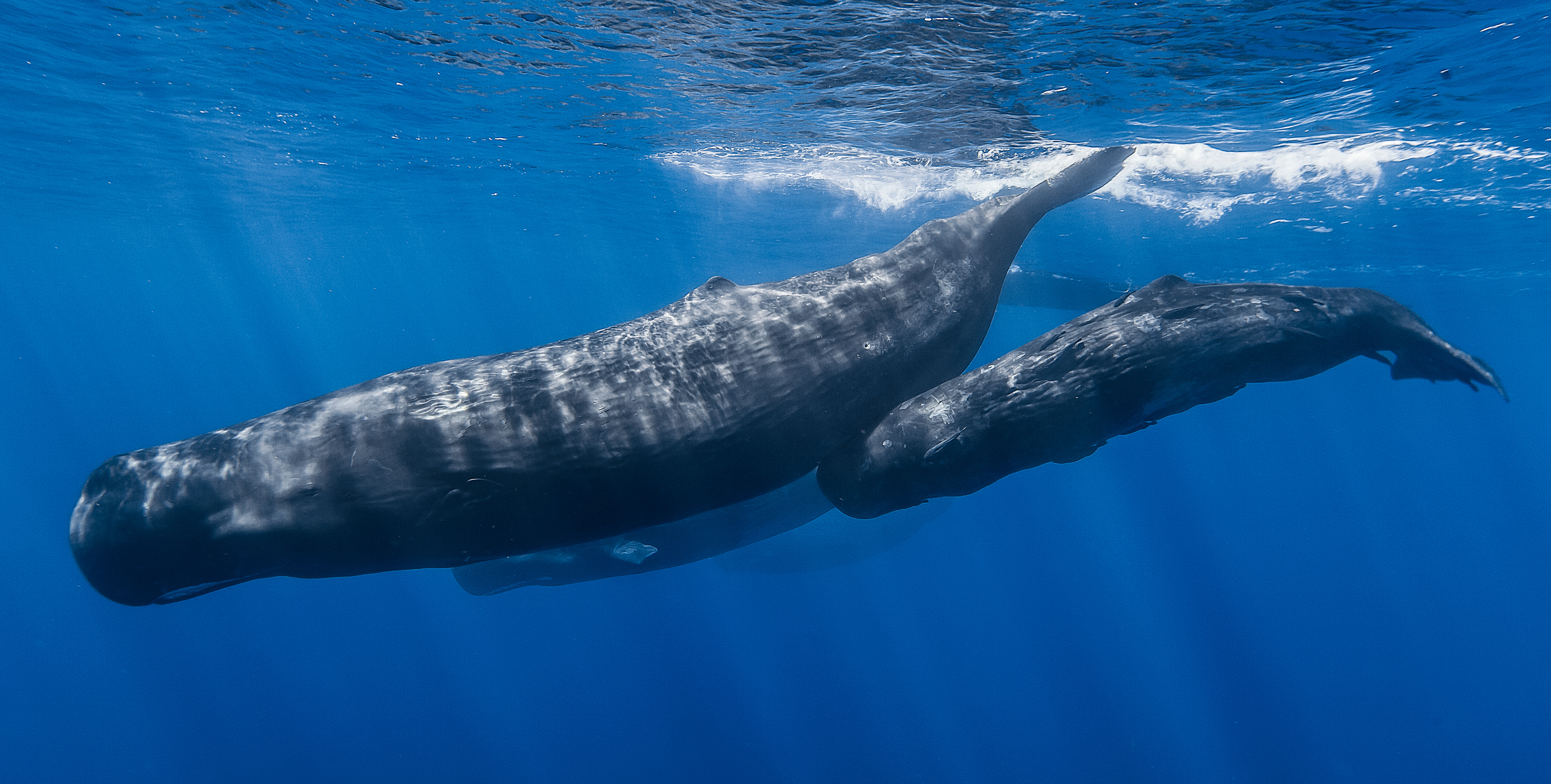
Sperm whales off Mauritius

The order Cetacea includes whales, dolphins and porpoises. They are the mammals most fully adapted to aquatic life with a spindle-shaped nearly hairless body, protected by a thick layer of blubber, and forelimbs and tail modified to provide propulsion underwater.

- Suborder: Mysticeti
  - Family: Balaenopteridae
    - Subfamily: Balaenopterinae
      - Genus: Balaenoptera
        - Common minke whale, Balaenoptera acutorostrata LC
        - Antarctic minke whale, Balaenoptera bonaerensis DD
        - Bryde's whale, Balaenoptera edeni DD
        - Southern sei whale, Balaenoptera borealis schlegelii EN
        - Southern fin whale, Balaenoptera physalus quoyi EN
        - Pygmy blue whale, Balaenoptera musculus brevicauda DD
        - Southern blue whale, Balaenoptera musculus intermedia EN
    - Family: Megapterinae
      - Genus: Megaptera
        - Humpback whale, Megaptera novaeangliae LC
    - Family: Balaenidae
      - Genus: Eubalaena
        - Southern right whale, Eubalaena australis LC (rarer on today's Mauritius)
- Suborder: Odontoceti
  - Family: Physeteridae
    - Genus: Physeter
      - Sperm whale, Physeter macrocephalus VU
  - Family: Kogiidae
    - Genus: Kogia
      - Pygmy sperm whale, Kogia breviceps DD
      - Dwarf sperm whale, Kogia sima DD
  - Family: Ziphidae
    - Genus: Indopacetus
      - Tropical bottlenose whale, Indopacetus pacificus DD
    - Genus: Ziphius
      - Cuvier's beaked whale, Ziphius cavirostris DD
    - Subfamily: Hyperoodontinae
      - Genus: Mesoplodon
        - Blainville's beaked whale, Mesoplodon densirostris DD
        - Gray's beaked whale, Mesoplodon grayi DD
        - Hector's beaked whale, Mesoplodon hectori DD
        - Layard's beaked whale, Mesoplodon layardii DD
        - True's beaked whale, Mesoplodon mirus DD
  - Superfamily: Delphinoidea
    - Family: Delphinidae (marine dolphins)
      - Genus: Steno
        - Rough-toothed dolphin, Steno bredanensis LC
      - Genus: Grampus
        - Risso's dolphin, Grampus griseus DD
      - Genus: Globicephala
        - Short-finned pilot whale, Globicephala macrorhynchus DD
      - Genus: Sousa
        - Indian humpback dolphin, Sousa plumbea NT
      - Genus: Tursiops

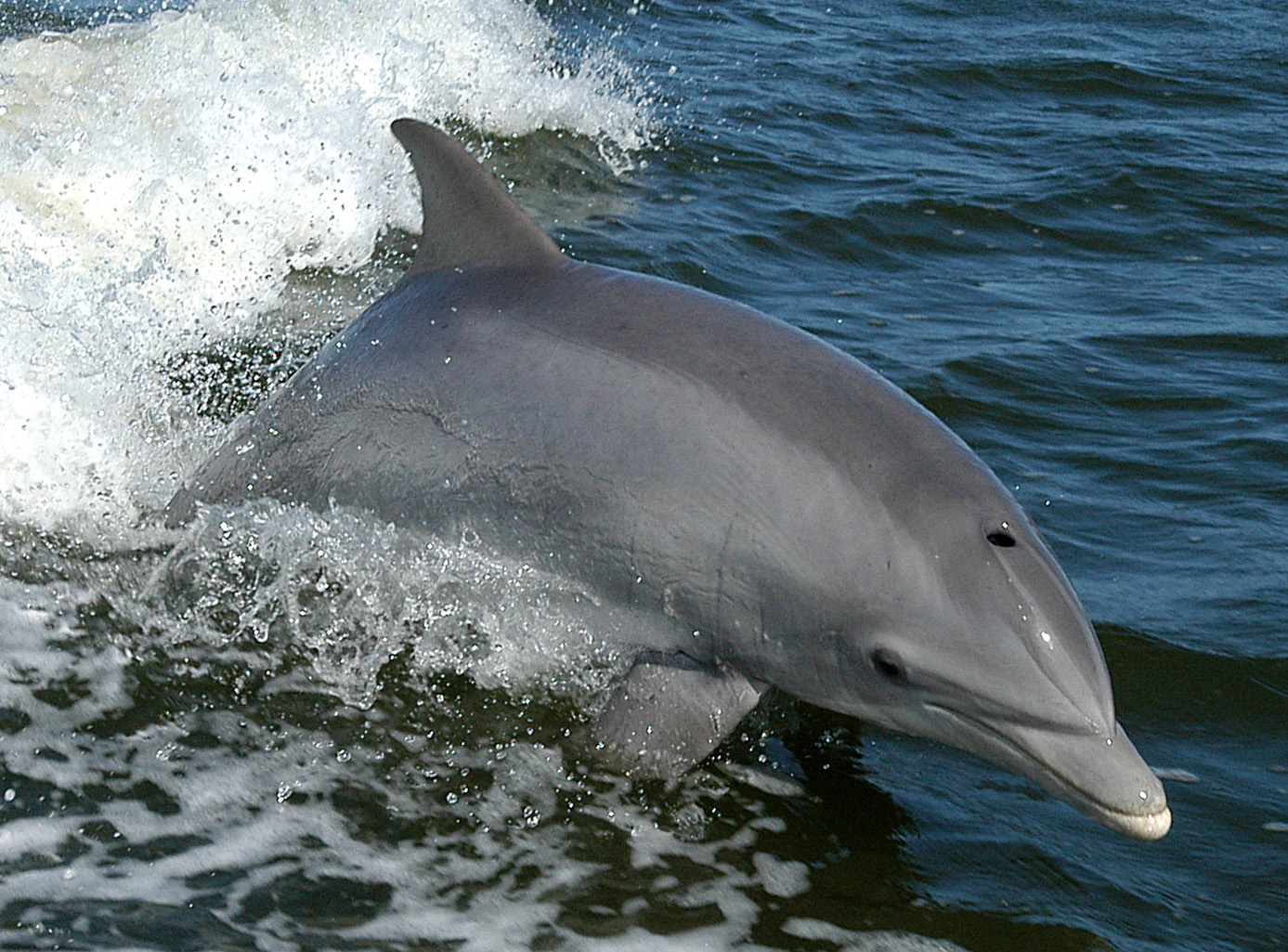
Common bottlenose dolphin

        - Indo-Pacific bottlenose dolphin, Tursiops aduncus DD
        - Common bottlenose dolphin, Tursiops truncatus LC
      - Genus: Stenella
        - Pantropical spotted dolphin, Stenella attenuata LC
        - Striped dolphin, Stenella coeruleoalba LC
        - Spinner dolphin, Stenella longirostris DD
      - Genus: Delphinus
        - Long-beaked common dolphin, Delphinus capensis DD
      - Genus: Lagenodelphis
        - Fraser's dolphin, Lagenodelphis hosei DD
      - Genus: Peponocephala
        - Melon-headed whale, Peponocephala electra DD
      - Genus: Pseudorca
        - False killer whale, Pseudorca crassidens DD
      - Genus: Feresa
        - Pygmy killer whale, Feresa attenuata DD
      - Genus: Orcinus
        - Orca, Orcinus orca DD

== Order: Carnivora (carnivorans) ==
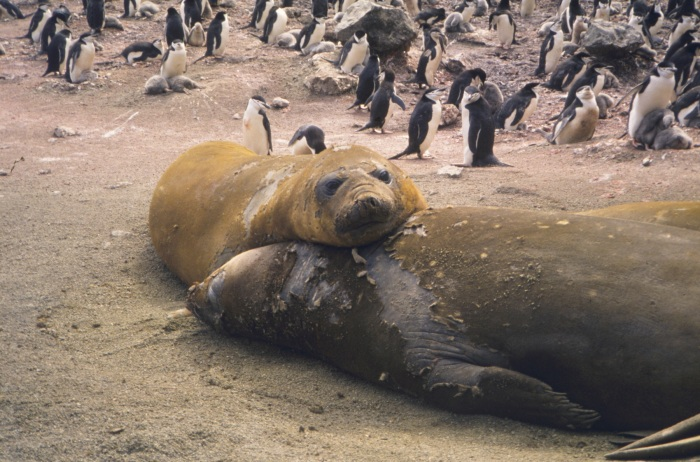
Southern elephant seal

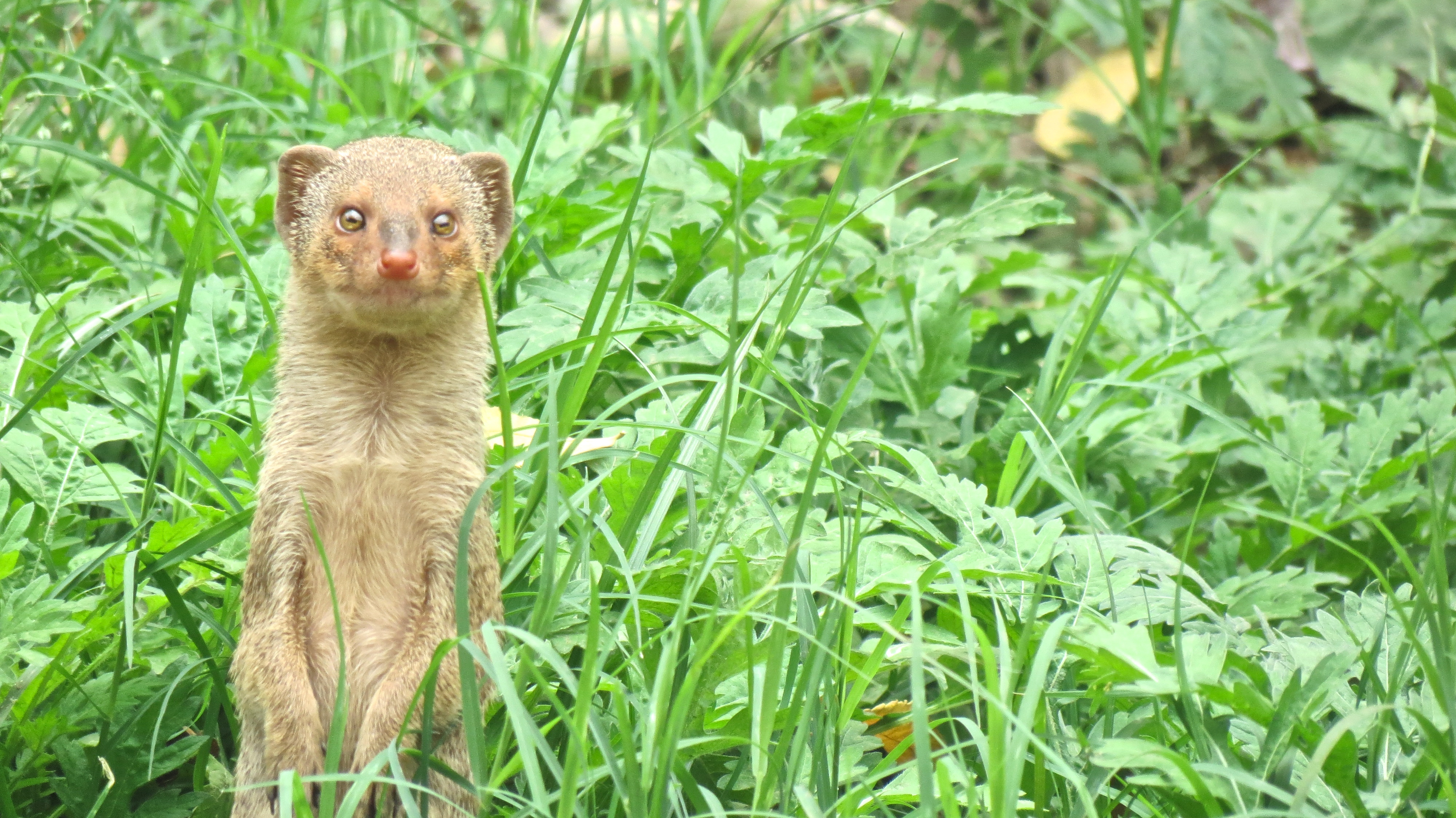
Small Indian mongoose

There are over 260 species of carnivorans, the majority of which feed primarily on meat. They have a characteristic skull shape and dentition.

- Suborder: Feliformia
  - Family: Herpestidae
    - Genus: Urva
      - Small Indian mongoose, U. auropunctatus LC introduced
  - Family: Felidae
    - Genus: Felis
      - Feral cat, F. catus DD introduced
- Suborder: Caniformia
  - Family: Canidae
    - Genus: Canis
      - Feral dog, C. familiaris DD introduced
  - Family: Phocidae (earless seals)
    - Genus: Mirounga
      - Southern elephant seal, Mirounga leonina LC

== Order: Artiodactyla (even-toed ungulates) ==
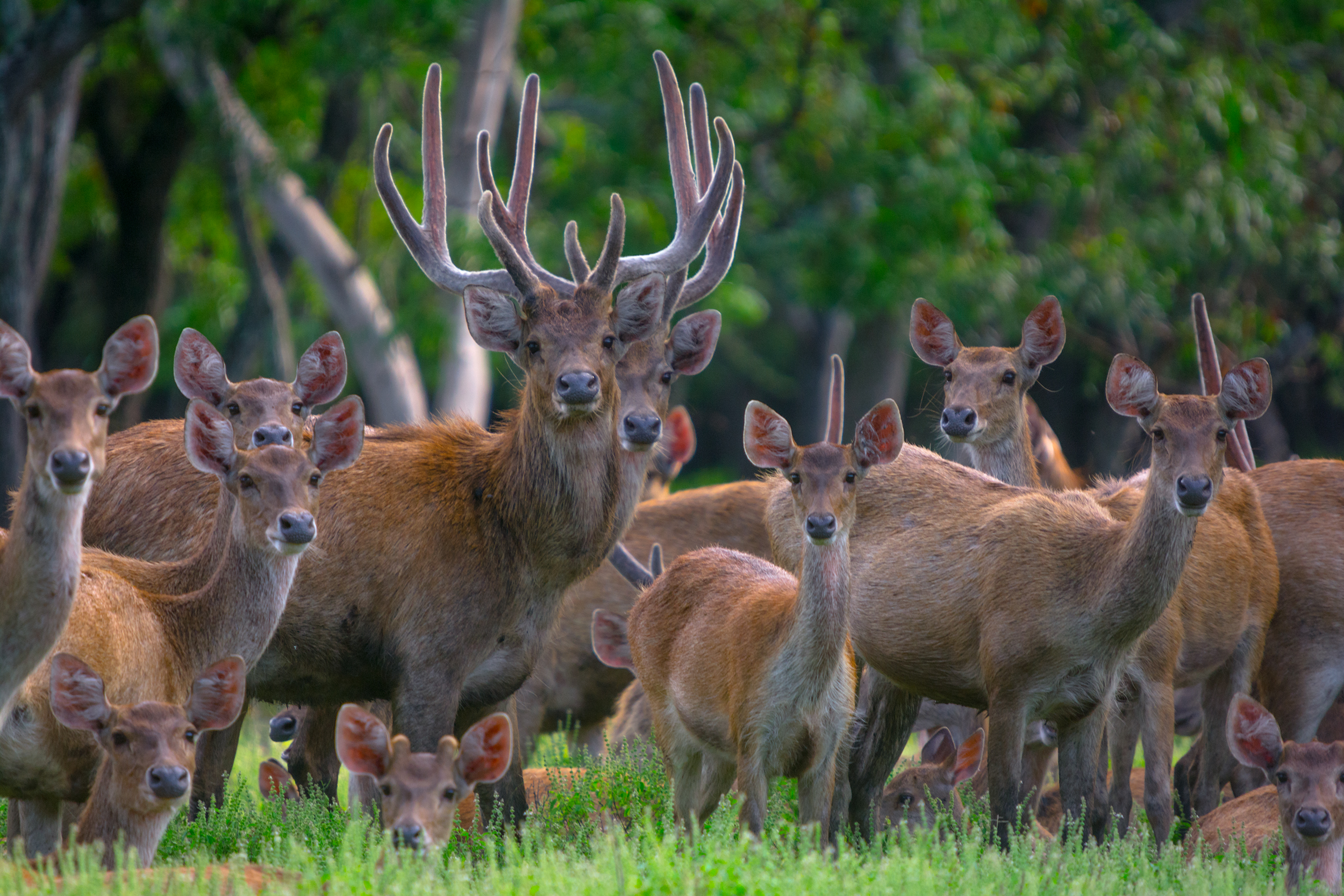
Javan rusa deer

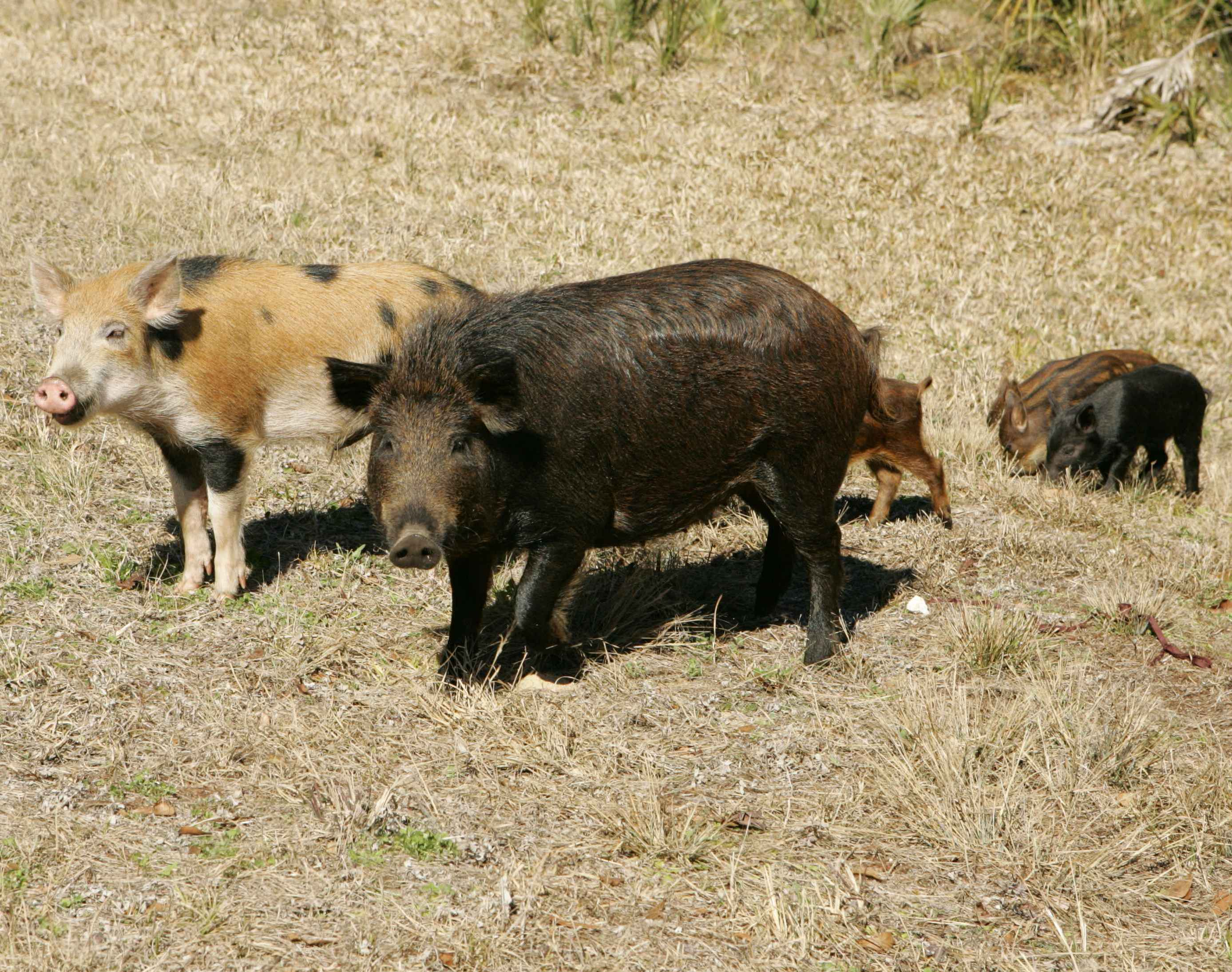
Feral pig

- Suborder: Ruminantia
  - Family: Bovidae
    - Genus: Bos
      - Zebu, B. indicus DD introduced
      - Cattle, B. taurus LC introduced
    - Genus: Capra
      - Goat, C. hircus DD introduced
  - Family: Cervidae
    - Genus: Rusa
      - Javan rusa, R. timorensis VU introduced
- Suborder: Suina
  - Family: Suidae
    - Genus: Sus
      - Feral pig, S. scrofa LC introduced

== Order: Primates ==
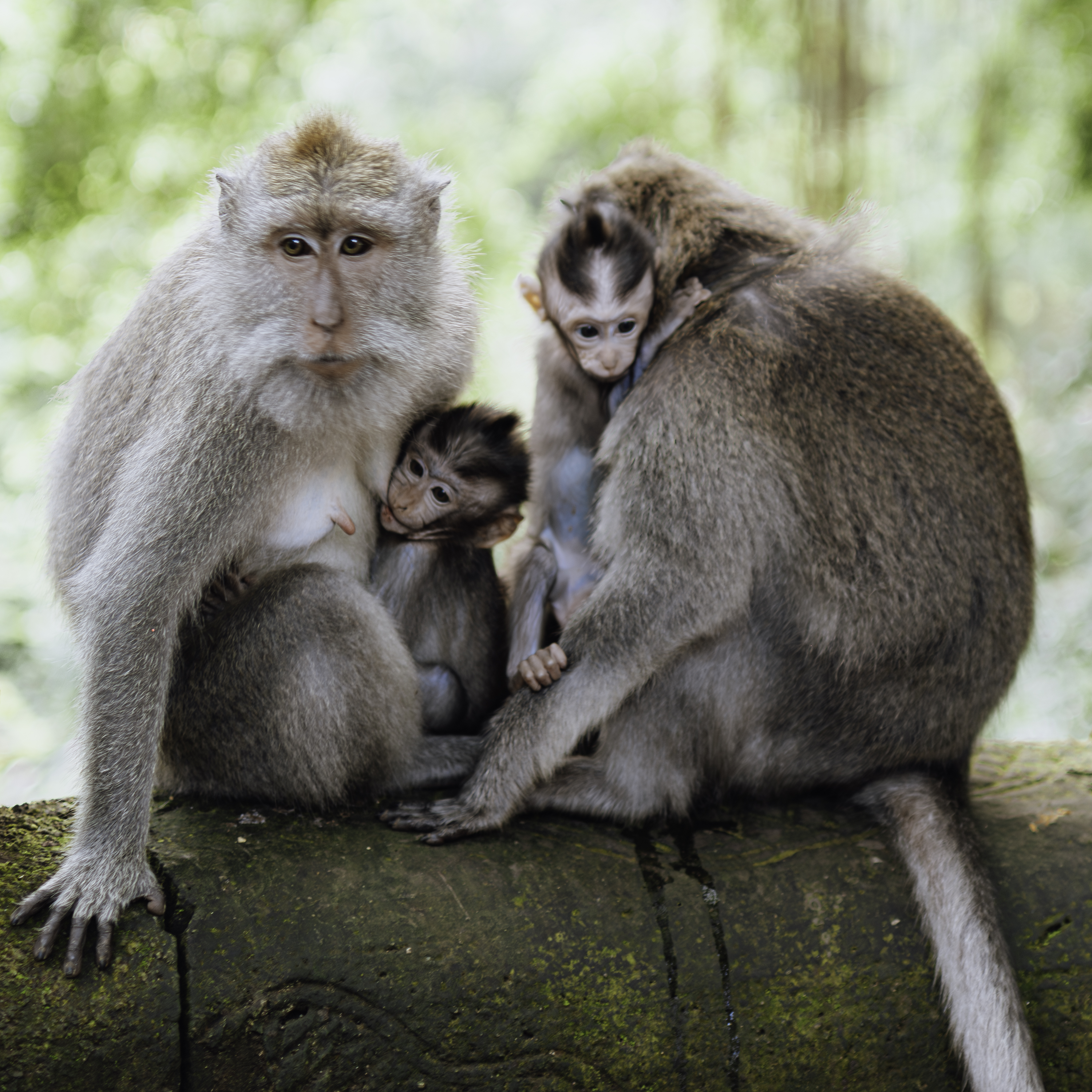
Crab-eating macaque

- Suborder: Haplorhini
  - Family: Cercopithecidae
    - Genus: Macaca
      - Crab-eating macaque, M. fascicularis EN introduced

== Order: Afrosoricida ==
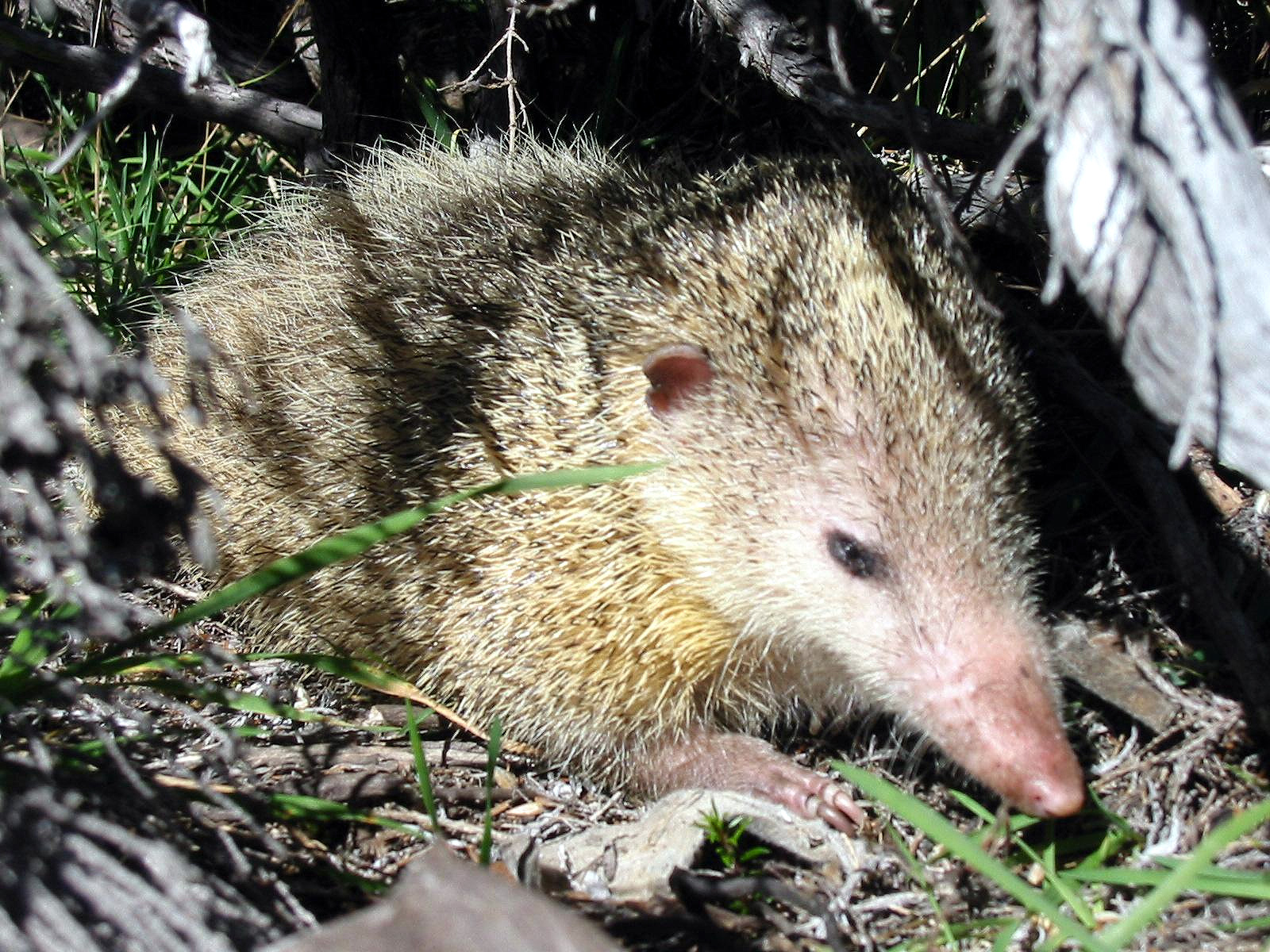
Tailless tenrec

- Suborder: Tenrecomorpha
  - Family: Tenrecidae
    - Genus: Tenrec
      - Tailless tenrec, T. ecaudatus LC introduced from Madagascar

== Order: Lagomorpha ==
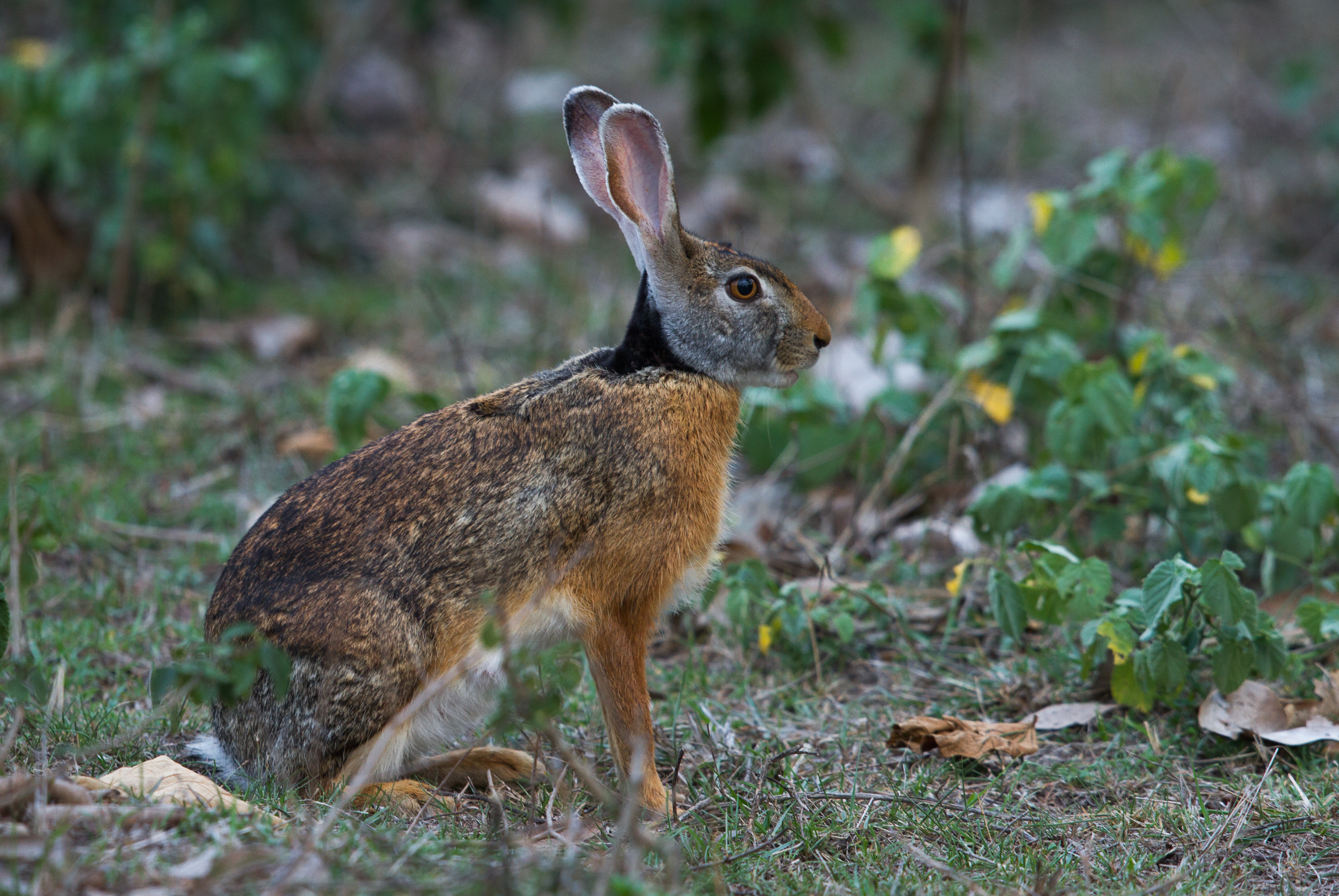
Indian hare

- Family: Leporidae
  - Genus: Lepus
    - Indian hare, L. nigricollis LC introduced

== Order: Eulipotyphla ==
- Family: Soricidae
  - Genus: Suncus
    - Asian house shrew, S. murinus LC introduced

== Order: Rodentia (rodents) ==
- Family: Muridae
  - Genus: Mus
    - House mouse, M. musculus LC introduced
  - Genus: Rattus
    - Black rat, R. rattus LC introduced
    - Common rat, R. norvegicus LC introduced

== See also ==
- Wildlife of Mauritius
- List of chordate orders
- Lists of mammals by region
- List of prehistoric mammals
- Mammal classification
- List of mammals described in the 2000s
