= .mu =

Internet country-code top level domain for Mauritius

- Introduced: 6 October 1995
- TLD type: Country code top-level domain
- Status: Active
- Registry: MUNIC
- Sponsor: Internet Direct Ltd.
- Intended use: Entities connected with Mauritius
- Actual use: Used by various sites, many (but not all) having something to do with Mauritius; also used for MUsic and MUseum sites
- Registration restrictions: None
- Structure: Can register at second level or at third level beneath various second-level labels; there is some redundancy (both .com.mu and .co.mu exist)
- Documents: Policies
- Registry website: MUNIC

.mu is the Internet country code top-level domain (ccTLD) for Mauritius. It is administered by the Mauritius Network Information Centre and registrations are processed via accredited registrars. Some registrars market it as the .music and .museum TLD.

== Usage ==
A number of musical groups have started to use this domain, with .mu being used to indicate music. Some examples are the rock band Athlete, the country band Lonestar, the British progressive rock bands Muse and Pendragon, the New Age musical project Amethystium and the 80s influenced hardcore metal band Blessed By A Broken Heart. In addition, the UK-based record label Planet Mu also uses the .mu domain, with the .mu forming the second half of the label's name. The world's largest direct seller of musical instruments, (Musician's Friend), also uses a .mu URL (frnd.mu) as a link shortener for several of their social media channels, including Twitter. The French webpage for the Canadian Broadcasting Corporation (Radio-Canada) uses the .mu domain for its Music network's web-only personalised music streams.

== Recent events ==
In 2009, a Memorandum of Understanding was signed between Internet Direct and the Government of Mauritius. In 2012, the agreement was not renewed by the Ministry of IT. In July 2013, Internet Direct Limited stated that they would no longer provide services to the Government of Mauritius unless the arrears for domain name registrations and renewals are settled. The National Computer Board of Mauritius refused to pay, claiming that it should be free because they are the Government.

The Information and Communication Technologies Authority (ICTA Mauritius) published a consultation paper in September 2011 and April 2012, with a view to forcing a re-delegation. At the public consultation meeting held on 12 April 2012, the international consultant informed ICTA that their proposal was clumsy and the Government does not have a case for re-delegation, because their proposed model is inappropriate and no proposal will be possible without working together with the current sponsoring organization "Internet Direct Ltd".

In October 2014, the portal of the government of Mauritius was no longer accessible outside the Orange network. Orange is a subsidiary of Mauritius Telecom, the state-owned telecom operator. Various IT experts including staff of AfriNIC, Google and the local Linux Group found that the DNS servers set up by Orange contained incorrect entries, thereby hiding from the Mauritius public the true situation when in fact the services were already disconnected. The Ministry of Information and Communication Technology of Mauritius was not aware of the issue. All the websites hosted on the gov.mu domain name were no longer accessible. It turned out that the Government, despite numerous extensions given to settle the renewal fees, still did not pay for the services and requested the Supreme Court to order Internet Direct Ltd to provide the service for free in perpetuity. Both the Ministry of IT and Internet Direct Ltd have declined to provide any comments about the matter, since the case was still being disputed in court.

In January 2015, the Government formally withdrew their case against Internet Direct Ltd and are in discussion for an amicable settlement for the amount owed by the Government. There has been several meetings since between the various advisers.

== Second-level domains ==
- .com.mu: Commercial entities
- .net.mu: Network entities
- .org.mu: Non-profit organisations
- .biz.mu: Commercial entities
- .edu.mu: Educational institutions
- .gov.mu: Government organisations
- .ac.mu: Academic institutions
- .co.mu: Commercial entities (no longer available for new registration by most registrars)
- .or.mu: Non-profit organisations (no longer available for new registration by most registrars)

== See also ==
- .io - of the Chagos Archipelago a/k/a British Indian Ocean Territory (BIOT)
