= Emtel =

Telecommunications company in Mauritius

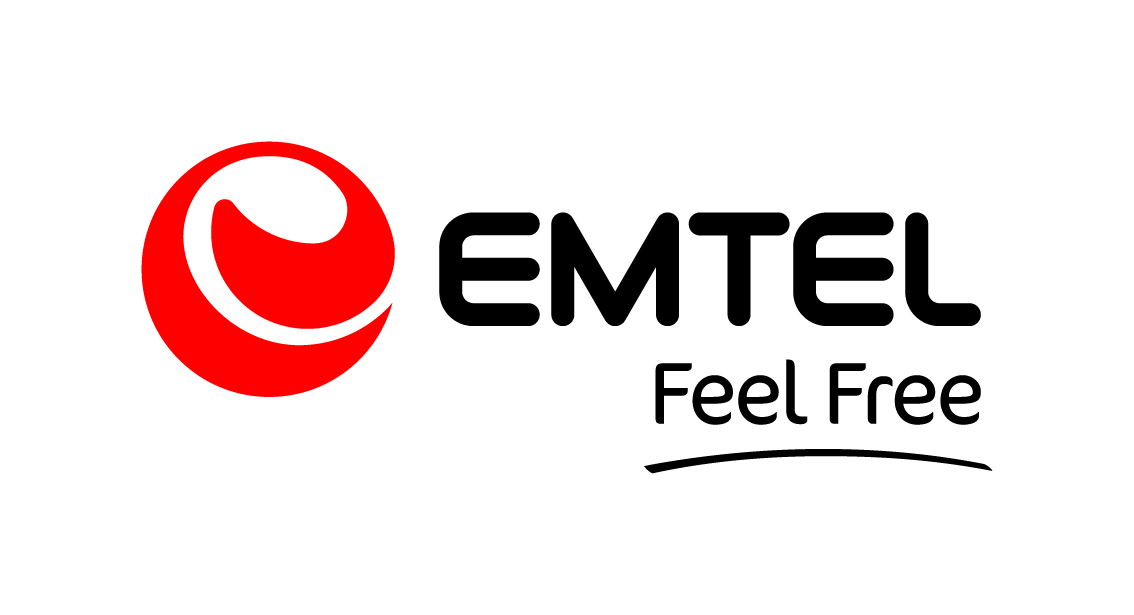
- Company type: Private
- Industry: Telecommunications
- Founded: 29 May 1989; 36 years ago
- Headquarters: Ebene City, Mauritius
- Area served: Nationwide
- Website: www.emtel.com

Emtel Ltd. is a telecommunications company based in Ebene City, Mauritius. Launched on 29 May 1989 – Emtel Ltd became the first mobile telephony operator in the Southern Hemisphere. This took place under the aegis of The Currimjee Jeewanjee Group.

Indian conglomerate Bharti Enterprises acquired a 25% stake in Emtel on 27 April 2015 through its subsidiary, Indian Continent Investment Limited (ICIL).

In 1999, Emtel launched its GSM service offerings, three years after its competitor mainly because of exclusive rights allocated to Cellplus Ltd to operate GSM technology in Mauritius. As such, Emtel experienced a significant decline in market share at the end of the 1990s. In August 2017, Emtel won its long going legal case against the ICTA/MT/Cellplus. The Supreme Court of Mauritius ruled exclusive rights to Cellplus as unfair competition and defendants should compensate Emtel Ltd Rs 554,190,000.

The company now supplies a range of telecommunication services. In November 2004, Emtel became the first company in Africa to launch 3G/UMTS services. In May 2012, following its 23rd anniversary, Emtel launched 4G[LTE] and became the first fully operational LTE provider in Mauritius. The company now operates GSM, GPRS, 3G/UMTS as well as 3.5G/HSDPA, 4G/[LTE] and WIMAX networks.

Emtel also offers Internet and international connectivity via undersea Optical fibre and Data Centre Services. In June 2015, Emtel launched the first Fibre Through The Air (FTTA) of the region.

== Timeline ==
- 1989 29 May, Emtel became the first mobile telephony operation in the Southern Hemisphere, as a result of collaboration between the Currimjee Jeewanjee Group and Millicom International Cellular (MIC) S.A..
- 1995 Emtel was one of the founders of Bharti Cellular Ltd with the first Indian GSM network in New Delhi
- 1996 Introduction of international roaming in Mauritius
- 1998 Emtel was the first company to introduce a prepaid system for its customers
- 1999 Emtel introduces new modes of communications with SMS, mobile email and 6-party conferencing.
- 2000 Emtel was the first to introduce the Short Message Service (SMS)
- 2002 introduction of SMS-based information provision and the launch of the first mobile internet portal in Mauritius bringing interaction between web and cellular phone.
- 2003 Emtel service, JukeBox 135 allows the Emtel subscriber to listen and dedicate songs to any other telephone number. The company also launched the roaming facility to its prepaid customers on that same year.
- 2004 Emtel brings MMS. During the following months, Emtel launched the first 3G network in Africa which enabled new services like videotelephony, and video surveillance where customers could remotely monitor their house through a webcam connected to the internet on their mobile phone.
- 2005 Emtel launches Caller Tunes, which allows customers to personalize their Caller Tone.
- 2006 Emtel Networks extends to Rodrigues outer-island. Emtel TV is launched comprising 10 television channels
- 2007 Emtel launches WIMAX technology aimed at providing wireless data communication over long distances. The company is the first to introduce HSDPA (High Speed Downlink Packet Access) on the local market. It offers 3.5G services, which allows networks to have higher data transfer speeds and capacity with mobile access via the Emtel USB Modem (Huawei E220) with 1.8 Mbit/s maximum downlink speed.
- 2008 Emtel launches Gift and Collect SMS, allowing the user to send SMS even when short of mobile credits
- 2009 Emtel receives ISO 9001:2008 certification by the British Standards Institution. 29 May – Emtel celebrates its 20th anniversary. On 2 June, Emtel launches its Underground Fibre Optical project at its Boundary Road office. This cable is the first in its kind in Mauritius, and will provide access to high speed Internet services. The first phase of the project is 137 km long. 11 November – Emtel wins the "Changing Lives" AfricaCom Award in Cape Town for having launched its mobile network in Agaléga, giving Agalaéans access to the same services and the same tariffs as in Mauritius and Rodrigues.
- 2010 Emtel launches a service, enabling subscribers to use both prepaid and postpaid while keeping their existing Emtel number as well as their SIM card. Emtel later launches m-payment to enable mobile payment of Emtel bills via SMS, other services such as utility bill payment or cinema ticket purchase to be launched. In August, Emtel launches SOS Refill which enables the user to obtain a Rs 5 emergency credit if they have less than Rs3 on their prepaid balance.
- 2011 Emtel becomes the first Mauritian operator to launch Facebook mobile, with the possibility to post status updates via SMS; receive updates, likes, etc.
- 2012 Emtel launches its data center at Arsenal (Mauritius) for contingency. Later on, it launches its fixed wireless telephony services to home and office users. In May, on its 23rd anniversary, Emtel soft-launches the 4G-LTE service. The service is commercially launched in July 2012 offering service speeds of up to 150 Mbit/s. In September 2012, Emtel is rebranded with a new logo and new slogan: "Emtel – You. First"
- 2013 Emtel launched fixed voice and data/Internet services and invested in Data-related projects such as the international submarine fibre optic cable and network modernisation.
- 2014 Emtel launches its PRI fixed telephony service for businesses and is also the first mobile network operator in Mauritius to be IPv6 ready.
- 2015 Emtel becomes the official triple play partner of Manchester United in Mauritius on 5 February 2015. Later on, Emtel launches the www.1010.mu portal offering the best choice for digital lifestyles: website design in seconds, business class email and automated Cloud backup, enabling customers to access a whole new world of possibilities. On 16 June 2015, Emtel launched "Airbox by Emtel" offering unlimited high speed internet to residential users.
- 2016 Emtel launches unlimited Facebook and WhatsApp for prepaid and postpaid customers who have activated a mobile internet pack.
