= International rankings of Mauritius =

These are the international rankings of Mauritius

== Economy ==
| Name | Source | Year | Global rank (may be continental depending on index) | Notes | Ref |
|---|---|---|---|---|---|
| Global Financial Centres Index | Z/Yen | 2019 | 41 out of 193* | 3rd in African Continent. | Global Financial Centres Index |
| Economy of Africa Continent | African Center for Economic Transformation | 2014 | 41 out of 163* | 1st in African Continent. | |
| Ibrahim Index of African Governance | Mo Ibrahim Foundation | 2019 | 43rd out of 193* | 3rd in African Continent. | |
| Economic Freedom of the World | Fraser Institute | 2019 | 41 out of 165* | 2nd in African Continent. | |
| Economic Freedom Index | The Heritage Foundation | 2022 | 31 out of 175* | 1st in African Continent. | ^{[unfit]} |
| Good Country Index | Forbes | 2022 | 39 out of 193* | 1st in African Continent. | |
| Ease of doing business index | World Bank | 2020 | 13 out of 192* | 3rd in African Continent. | |
| Human Development Index | United Nations | 2019 | 67 out of 193* | 2nd in Africa | |
| Global Enabling Trade Report | World Economic Forum | 2016 | 39 out of 136* | 1st in African Continent. | |
| Global Competitiveness Report | World Economic Forum | 2019 | 52 out of 141* | 2nd in African Continent. | |
| Travel and Tourism Competitiveness Report | World Economic Forum | 2019 | 51 out of 145* | 3rd in African Continent. | |
| Global Innovation Index | World Intellectual Property Organization | 2026 | 50 out of 139* | Mauritius ranks 1st among the 31 economies in Sub-Saharan Africa. | ] |
| International Property Rights Index | Americans for Tax Reform's Property Rights Alliance | 2019 | 41 out of 129* | 2nd in African Continent. | |
| International Innovation Index | A.T. Kearney | 2019 | 30 out of 151* | 3rd in African Continent. | |

== Environment and ecology ==
| Name | Source | Year | Rank | Notes | Ref |
|---|---|---|---|---|---|
| Environmental Performance Index | Yale University, Columbia University | 2022 | 75 out of 189* | 3rd in African Continent. | |
| Environmental Vulnerability Index | South Pacific Applied Geoscience Commission, United Nations Environment Program | 2013 | 191 out of 193*` | Classified as 'Highly vulnerable' | |
| Happy Planet Index | New Economics Foundation | 2019 | 32nd out of 151* | 3rd in African Continent. | |

== Politics ==
| Name | Source | Year | Rank | Notes | Ref |
|---|---|---|---|---|---|
| Corruption Perceptions Index | Transparency International | 2021 | 49 out of 193* | Perceived as less corrupt, 3rd in Africa | |
| Democracy Ranking | Democracy Ranking Association | 2016 | 39 out of 112* | 2nd in African Continent. | |
| Global Peace Index | Institute for Economics and Peace | 2023* | 28 out of 163* | 3rd in African Continent. | |
| Global Terrorism Index | Institute for Economics and Peace | 2022 | 91 out of 193* | 2nd in African Continent. | |
| Democracy Index | Economist Intelligence Unit | 2023* | 19 out of 189* | Classified as 'Partially Democracy', 3rd in African Continent. | |

== Education ==
| Name | Source | Year | Rank | Notes | Ref |
|---|---|---|---|---|---|
| Education Index | Countries by literacy rate | 2018 | 63 out of 184* | 2nd, and 3rd in African Continent. | |
| Knowledge Economic Index | International Monetary Fund, The World Bank | 2012 | 63 out of 175* | 1st in African Continent. | |
| Human Development Index | United Nations Development Programme | 2012 | 63 out of 185* | 1st, and 2nd in African Continent. | |
| Linguistic diversity index. | Trends in International Mathematics and Science Study | 2013 | 63 out of 193* | 1st in African Continent. | |

== Media ==
| Name | Source | Year | Rank | Notes | Ref |
|---|---|---|---|---|---|
| Press Freedom Index | Reporters Without Borders | 2022 | 64 out of 181* | 3rd in African Continent. | |
| Freedom of the Press | Freedom House | 2017 | 56 out of 193*` | 2nd in African Continent. | |

== Communication and Information Technology ==
| Name | Source | Year | Rank | Notes | Ref |
|---|---|---|---|---|---|
| Networked Readiness Index | World Economic Forum | 2019 | 71 out of 121* | 2nd in African Continent. | |
| ICT Development Index | International Telecommunication Union | 2017 | 72 out of 176* | 3rd in African Continent. | |
| E-government Readiness | United Nations | 2018 | 66 out of 193* | 2nd in African Continent. | |
| World Wide Web Foundation | Web Index | 2019 | 71 out of 121* | 3rd in African Continent. | |

== Others Categories ==
| Name | Source | Year | Rank | Notes | Ref |
|---|---|---|---|---|---|
| World Happiness Report | United Nations:(SSDN)` | 2019 | 57 out of 156* | 2nd in African Continent. | |
| Global Gender Gap Report | World Economic Forum | 2023 | 105 out of 142* | 3rd in African Continent. | |
| Fragile States Index | Fund for Peace and Foreign Policy | 2015 | 145 out of 178* | 3rd in African Continent. | |
| Social Progress Index | Social Progress Imperative | 2014 | 34 out of 132* | 1st in African Continent. | |
| Good Country Index | Simon Anholt | 2016/2017* | 33 out of 163* | 1st in African Continent. | |
| Logistics Performance Index | Mercer | 2014* | 82 out of 215* | 2nd in African Continent. | |
| Global Slavery Index | Walk Free | 2013 | 63 out of 145* | 2nd in African Continent. | |
| Legatum Prosperity Index | Legatum Institute | 2018 | 29 out of 146* | 2nd in African Continent. | |
| Countries by suicide rate | World Population Reviews | 2019* | 35 out of 183* | Mauritius ranked 33rd, and 34th in African Continent. | |
| World Giving Index | Charities Aid Foundation | 2013 | 93 out of 157* | Port Louis Ranked 2nd, and 3rd in African Continent. | |

== See also ==
- List of international rankings
