= State Bank Tower =

Coordinates: 20°09′43″S 57°30′05″E

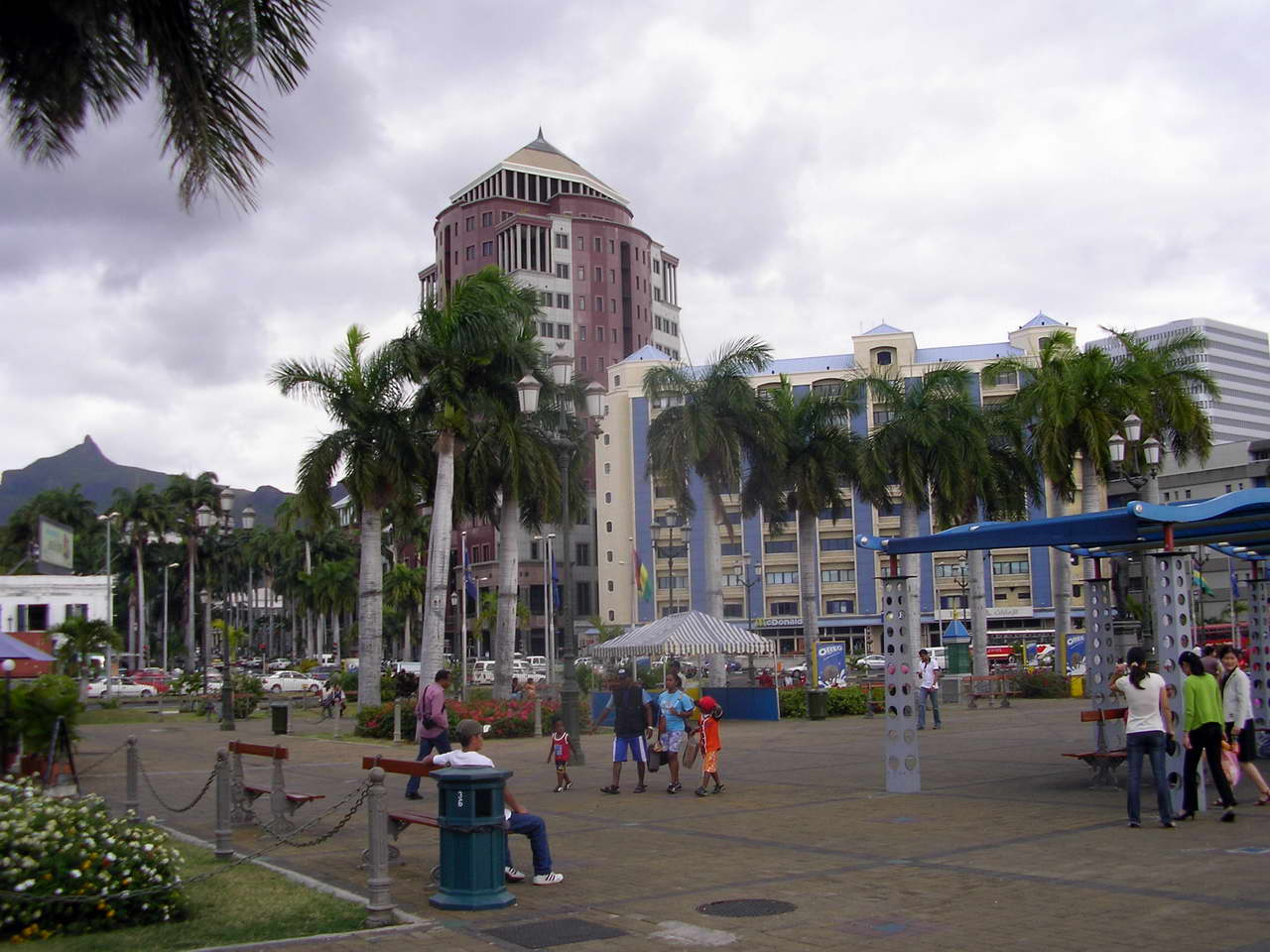
- The State Bank Tower as seen from the Port Louis Waterfront.
- Interactive map of the State Bank Tower area

General information
- Status: Completed
- Type: Offices
- Location: Port Louis, Mauritius
- Opening: 1995

Height
- Roof: 82 m (269 ft)

Technical details
- Floor count: 16

Design and construction
- Architect: Campbell Reith Hill

The State Bank Tower is a high-rise building in the capital city of Mauritius, Port Louis. The 16-storey tower contrary to popular belief, is not the tallest building in Port Louis. It is the fourth tallest building and only steel-frame skeleton high-rise on the island.

It was designed by Campbell Reith Hill. In February 1994, it was damaged by cyclone Hollanda which hit Mauritius with windspeeds of over 200 km/h when the building's construction tower crane smashed and tore on the high-rise. The 82 m-tall (269 ft) tower, hosting mostly offices, was finally inaugurated in 1995.
