= Mauritian (disambiguation) =

A Mauritian is a person from Mauritius, an island nation off the coast of the African continent in the southwest Indian Ocean.

Mauritian may also refer to:

- Mauritian Creole, a French-based creole language spoken in Mauritius
- Mauritian League, the top division of the Mauritius Football Association
  - Mauritian Cup, the top knockout tournament of Mauritian football
- Mauritian Labour Party, a major political party in Mauritius
- Mauritian duck (Anas theodori), a bird
- The Mauritian Wildlife Foundation, a non-governmental, non-profit conservation agency
- Mauritian dollar

== See also ==
- Culture of Mauritius
- List of Mauritians
