= Mauritius Telecom =

Telecommunications company in Mauritius

Mauritius Telecom Ltd
- Industry: Telecommunications
- Predecessor: Overseas Telecommunications Services Ltd; Mauritius Telecommunication Services Ltd
- Founded: 1992; 34 years ago
- Headquarters: Mauritius Telecom Tower; Port Louis, Mauritius
- Area served: Nationwide
- Key people: Veemal Gungadin (CEO) – 14 April 2025
- Products: Fixed line services; Fibre broadband & TV; Mobile services; Mobile money
- Revenue: ▲ ₨ 12.7 billion (2023)
- Total assets: ▲ ₨ 25.1 billion (2023)
- Number of employees: 2,338
- Subsidiaries: Cellplus Mobile Communications Ltd; Telecom Plus Ltd; Teleforce Ltd; Mauritius Telecom Optima; MT Properties Ltd; Mauritius Telecom Foundation; MT International Ventures PCC; MT Services Ltd
- Website: www.telecom.mu

Mauritius Telecom (MT) is a telecommunications company in Mauritius, a small republic in the Indian Ocean. The company had about 392,000 fixed line customers, 969,000 mobile customers, 404,000 fibre-ready homes, 178,000 IPTV customers, and 255,000 broadband internet customers (myt ADSL) as of December 2019.

== History ==
Mauritius Telecom was founded in July 1992 by a merger between the former Overseas Telecommunications Services Ltd and Mauritius Telecommunication Services Ltd. As from that date, Mauritius Telecom became the major provider of voice, mobile, internet and data communication services in Mauritius.

In 1996, Cellplus Mobile Communications Ltd, a Mobile Network Operator and a fully owned subsidiary of Mauritius Telecom launched the GSM network in Mauritius and later during the same year Telecom Plus Ltd, another fully owned subsidiary of Mauritius Telecom as from 2006, launched a dial-up internet access service.

In November 2000, France Telecom (now Orange S.A.) became the majority shareholder of Mauritius Telecom by acquiring 40% of its shares. Following the partnership with France Telecom, Telecom Plus Ltd launched broadband internet access in 2002 under the Wanadoo brand.

The two companies launched their IPTV services branded as myt in June 2006, which enabled Mauritius to become among the first countries in the world to launch IPTV services.

On 17 April 2008, Mauritius Telecom re-branded its mobile and internet services as Orange. Cellplus Prepaid and Post Paid were rebranded as Orange Prepay and Post Pay. Telecom Plus dial-up internet access and Wanadoo ADSL as Orange Dial-Up and Orange ADSL.

In 2013, Mauritius Telecom introduced fibre-optic broadband. In May 2015, Mauritius Telecom announced that as from 1 June 2015, all its 850,000 Orange mobile customers would receive free unlimited access to Facebook.

After a 10-year branding agreement with Orange came to an end in September 2017. All Mauritius Telecom products were re-branded under the myt brand on 9 November 2017.

== Shareholders ==
Shareholders	Holding Structure (%)
RIMCOM Ltd	40%
Government of Mauritius	33.49%
SBM Holdings Ltd	19%
National Pensions Fund	6.55%
Employees of Mauritius Telecom	0.96%
Total	100.00

== Subsidiaries ==
Mauritius Telecom owns the following companies:

- Cellplus Mobile Communications Ltd
- Telecom Plus Ltd
- Teleforce Ltd
- Mauritius Telecom Optima
- MT Properties Ltd
- Mauritius Telecom Foundation
- MT International Ventures Ltd
- MT Services Ltd

== The myt brand ==
Mauritius Telecom portfolio of fixed, mobile, broadband and IPTV services is consolidated under one single umbrella brand: myt.
