= Ebene, Mauritius =

Ebene
- Suburb
- Ebene

- Location on Mauritius
- Coordinates: 20°14′35″S 57°29′30″E
- Country: Mauritius
- District: Plaines Wilhems
- City: November 2001
- Highest elevation: 273 m (896 ft)

Population (2012)
  - Total: 1,001
- Time zone: UTC+4 (MUT)
- Post Code: 72201
- Airport: Plaisance Airport (distanced approximately 29 km)

Ébène (Mauritian Creole pronunciation: [ebɛn]) is a suburb of Quatre Bornes, Mauritius, 15 kilometres (9.3 mi) south of the capital, Port Louis. Construction began in November 2001, with the suburb being promoted as a new information technology hub for Mauritius and as a link between African and Asian markets. The aim was to create a hi-tech office area in order to dynamise the country. As a result, it is also referred to as Ébène Cybercity or Cyber City.

== Ebene Cyber City ==
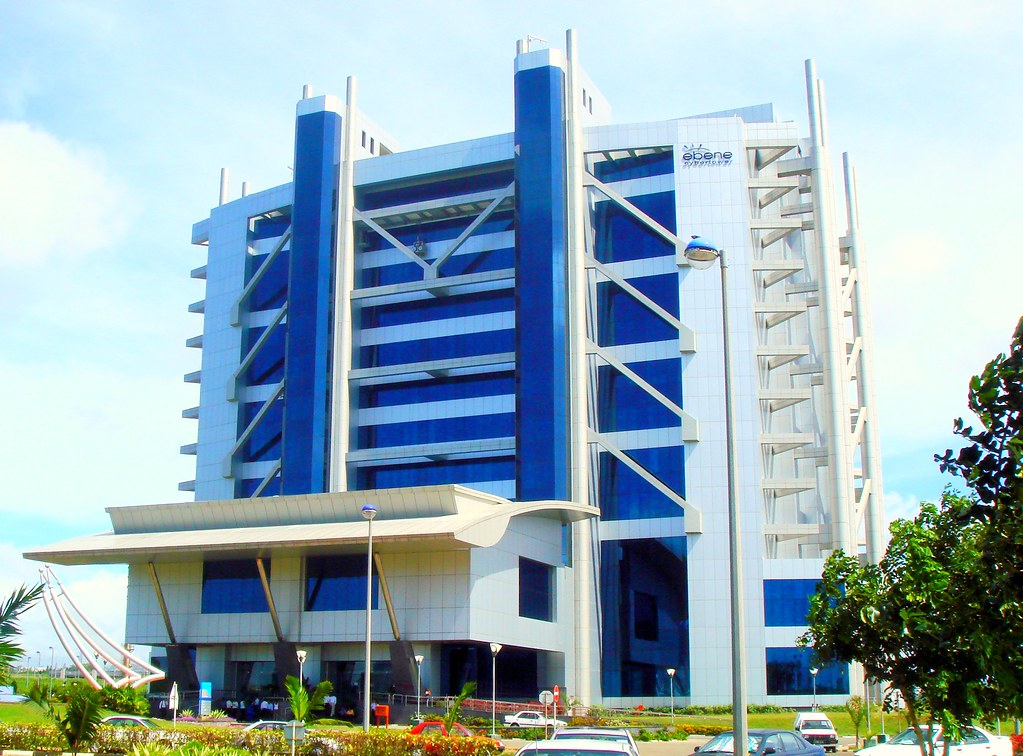
Atal Bihari Vajpayee Tower

Mauritius Research and Innovation Council has a centre at Ebene where it has a ground station for its satellite MIR-SAT1. Mauritius Metro has been expanded to Ebene.

The Atal Bihari Vajpayee Tower (formerly Cyber Tower One) is a 12-storey, 72-metre-tall commercial building located in Ébène Cybercity.
