= Visa requirements for Mauritian citizens =

Administrative entry restrictions

Visa requirements for Mauritian citizens are administrative entry restrictions by the authorities of other states placed on citizens of Mauritius. As of 2026, Mauritian citizens have visa-free or visa on arrival access to 147 countries and territories, ranking the Mauritian passport 25th in the world in terms of travel freedom (tied with Grenada) and 2nd in Africa according to the Henley Passport Index. As of April 2019, Brunei, Grenada, Seychelles and Mauritius are the only countries whose citizens may travel without a visa to China, Russia, the Schengen Area and the United Kingdom.

== Visa requirements map ==
Visa requirements for Mauritian citizens Mauritius Visa-free Visa available both on arrival or online Visa on arrival eVisa Visa required

== Visa requirements ==
Country	Visa requirement	Allowed stay	Notes (excluding departure fees)
Afghanistan	eVisa	30 days	Visa is not required in case born in Afghanistan or can proof that one of their parents is a national of Afghanistan or born in Afghanistan.; e-Visa : Visitors must arrive at Kabul International (KBL).
Albania	Visa not required	90 days	
Algeria	Visa required		
Andorra	Visa not required	90 days	
Angola	Visa not required	30 days	For a maximum total stay of 90 days within year period.
Antigua and Barbuda	Visa not required	180 days	
Argentina	Visa required		Electronic Travel Authorization must be approved before travel and is valid for tourism purposes. For this, they exclusively need to be holders of a valid category B2/ J / B1 / O / P (P1-P2-P3) / E / H-1B visa issued by the USA.
Armenia	Visa required		
Australia and territories	Visa required		May apply online (Online Visitor e600 visa).
Austria	Visa not required	3 months	3 months during a 6 months period following the date of first entry in the Schengen Area
Azerbaijan	eVisa	30 days	
Bahamas	Visa not required	3 months	
Bahrain	eVisa	14 days	
Bangladesh	Visa required		
Barbados	Visa not required	6 months	
Belarus	Visa required		Visas are issued on arrival at the Minsk International Airport if the support documents were submitted not later than 3 business days before expected date of arrival.
Belgium	Visa not required	3 months	3 months during a 6 months period following the date of first entry in the Schengen Area
Belize	Visa not required		
Benin	Visa not required	90 days	
Bhutan	eVisa		
Bolivia	Visa on arrival	90 days	
Bosnia and Herzegovina	Visa not required	90 days	90 days within any 6-month period
Botswana	Visa not required	90 days	
Brazil	Visa required		
Brunei	Visa required		
Bulgaria	Visa not required	3 months	3 months during a 6 months period in the Schengen Area
Burkina Faso	eVisa		
Burundi	Visa on arrival	1 month	
Cambodia	eVisa / Visa on arrival	30 days	Visa is also obtainable online.
Cameroon	eVisa		
Canada	Visa required		
Cape Verde	Visa on arrival		
Central African Republic	Visa required		
Chad	Visa required		
Chile	Visa not required	90 days	
China	Visa not required	60 days	
Colombia	eVisa		May apply online.
Comoros	Visa on arrival		
Republic of the Congo	Visa required		
Democratic Republic of the Congo	Visa on arrival	7 days	
Costa Rica	Visa not required	90 days	
Côte d'Ivoire	eVisa		
Croatia	Visa not required	90 days	90 days within any 180 day period in the Schengen Area
Cuba	eVisa		
Cyprus	Visa not required	90 days	90 days within any 180 day period
Czech Republic	Visa not required	3 months	3 months during a 6 months period following the date of first entry in the Schengen Area
Denmark	Visa not required	3 months	3 months during a 6 months period following the date of first entry in the Schengen Area
Djibouti	eVisa	31 days	
Dominica	Visa not required	6 months	
Dominican Republic	Visa not required	90 days	
Ecuador	Visa not required	90 days	
Egypt	Visa required		
El Salvador	Visa required		
Equatorial Guinea	eVisa		
Eritrea	Visa required		
Estonia	Visa not required	3 months	3 months during a 6 months period following the date of first entry in the Schengen Area
Eswatini	Visa not required	30 days	
Ethiopia	eVisa / Visa on arrival	30 days	
Fiji	Visa not required	4 months	
Finland	Visa not required	3 months	3 months during a 6 months period following the date of first entry in the Schengen Area
France	Visa not required	3 months	3 months during a 6 months period following the date of first entry in the Schengen Area
Gabon	Visa not required		
Gambia	Visa not required	90 days	Must obtain an entry clearance from the Gambian Immigration prior to travel.
Georgia	Visa not required	90 days	90 days within any 180 day period
Germany	Visa not required	3 months	3 months during a 6 months period following the date of first entry in the Schengen Area
Ghana	Visa not required	2 months	
Greece	Visa not required	3 months	3 months during a 6 months period following the date of first entry in the Schengen Area
Grenada	Visa not required	3 months	
Guatemala	Visa required		Nationals of Mauritius with a valid visa issued by Canada, the USA or a Schengen Member State for a maximum stay of 90 days.
Guinea	eVisa required	90 days	
Guinea-Bissau	eVisa / Visa on arrival	90 days	
Guyana	Visa required		
Haiti	Visa not required	90 days	
Honduras	Visa required		
Hungary	Visa not required	3 months	3 months during a 6 months period following the date of first entry in the Schengen Area
Iceland	Visa not required	3 months	3 months during a 6 months period following the date of first entry in the Schengen Area
India	e-Visa	60 days	e-Visa holders must arrive via 32 designated airports (Note: Ahmedabad; Amritsar; Bagdogra; Bengaluru; Bhubaneswar; Chandigarh; Chennai; Coimbatore; Delhi; Gaya; Goa-Dabolim; Goa-Manohar; Guwahati; Hyderabad; Indore; Jaipur; Kannur; Kochi; Kolkata; Kozhikode; Lucknow; Madurai; Mangaluru; Mumbai; Nagpur; Port Blair; Pune; Surat; Thiruvananthapuram; Tiruchirappalli; Varanasi; Visakhapatnam) or 5 designated seaports. (Note: Chennai; Cochin; Mormugao (Goa); Mumbai; Mangalore); An Indian e-Tourist Visa may only be obtained twice within 1 calendar year.; Foreigners of Pakistani origin or who hold a Pakistani Passport are not eligible for an e-Visa. Foreigners who are not Pakistani nationals, but whose parents or grandparents (either paternal or maternal) were born in, or were permanent residents in Pakistan, are also not eligible for an e-Visa.
Indonesia	Visa required		
Iran	Visa not required	15 days	
Iraq	eVisa		
Ireland	Visa required		
Israel	Electronic Travel Authorization	90 days	
Italy	Visa not required	3 months	3 months during a 6 months period following the date of first entry in the Schengen Area
Jamaica	Visa not required		
Japan	Visa not required	90 days	
Jordan	eVisa / Visa on arrival		Conditions apply
Kazakhstan	eVisa		
Kenya	Visa not required	3 months	
Kiribati	Visa not required	30 days	
North Korea	Visa required		
South Korea	Electronic Travel Authorization	30 days	
Kuwait	Visa required		
Kyrgyzstan	eVisa		eVisa holders must arrive via Manas International Airport.
Laos	eVisa / Visa on arrival	30 days	18 (Note: Savannakhet Airport; Lanetoui - Mengkang (China); Meuangmom - Wan Pong (Myanmar); Banvang - Ban Khok Phai (Thailand); Namngeun - Huay Kon (Thailand); Paksan - Bueng Kan (Thailand); Paktaphan - Pak Saeng (Thailand); Pangmon - Ban Huak (Thailand); Phoudou (Thailand); Dak ta ock - Nam Giang (Vietnam); La Lai (Vietnam); Namkan (Vietnam); Namphao - Cau Treo (Vietnam); Namsoy - Na Meo (Vietnam); Naphao - Cha Lo (Vietnam); Pahang - Long Sap (Vietnam); Panghok - Tây Trang (Vietnam); Phoukeua - Bo Y (Vietnam)) of the 33 border crossings are only open to regular visa holders.; e-Visa may be used to enter Laos through the Luang Prabang, Pakse and Vientiane international airports, 3 Thai-Lao Friendship Bridges (Note: Vientiane (Friendship Bridge 1); Savannakhet (Friendship Bridge 2); Bokeo (Friendship Bridge 4)), in Boten (road and railroad), and in Vientiane (at Khamsavath railway station).; Visa on arrival is available at the Luang Prabang, Pakse and Vientiane international airports, 4 Thai-Lao Friendship Bridges (Note: Vientiane (Friendship Bridge 1); Savannakhet (Friendship Bridge 2); Khammouane (Friendship Bridge 3); Bokeo (Friendship Bridge 4)) and 7 border crossings. (Note: Nongnokkheane - Trapeang Kriel (Cambodia); Boten - Bo han (China); Golden Triangle/Samliemkham (Thailand); Khamsavath railway station (Thailand); Namheuang - Ban Na Kraseng (Thailand); Vang tao - Chongmek (Thailand); Dansavan - Lao Bảo (Vietnam))
Latvia	Visa not required	3 months	3 months during a 6 months period following the date of first entry in the Schengen Area
Lebanon	Visa required		In addition to a visa, an approval should be obtained from the Immigration department of the General Directorate of General Security (La Surete Generale).
Lesotho	Visa not required	90 days	
Liberia	Visa required		
Libya	eVisa		
Liechtenstein	Visa not required	3 months	3 months during a 6 months period following the date of first entry in the Schengen Area
Lithuania	Visa not required	3 months	3 months during a 6 months period following the date of first entry in the Schengen Area
Luxembourg	Visa not required	3 months	3 months during a 6 months period following the date of first entry in the Schengen Area
Madagascar	eVisa / Visa on arrival	90 days	
Malawi	Visa not required	90 days	
Malaysia	Visa not required	30 days	
Maldives	Free visa on arrival	30 days	
Mali	Visa required		
Malta	Visa not required	3 months	3 months during a 6 months period following the date of first entry in the Schengen Area
Marshall Islands	Visa on arrival	90 days	
Mauritania	eVisa		Available at Nouakchott–Oumtounsy International Airport.
Mexico	Visa required		Visa is not required for Holders of a valid visa of Canada, US, UK or a Schengen State and Permanent residence of Canada, Chile, Colombia, Schengen State, Japan, UK, US.; Entry may be refused by immigration officials for individuals who were previously denied a US visa, even if holding a valid Mexican visa.
Micronesia	Visa not required	30 days	
Moldova	Visa not required	90 days	90 days within any 180 day period
Monaco	Visa not required		
Mongolia	eVisa		
Montenegro	Visa not required	90 days	
Morocco	Visa required		
Mozambique	Visa not required	3 months	
Myanmar	eVisa	28 days	eVisa holders must arrive via Yangon, Nay Pyi Taw or Mandalay airports or via land border crossings with Thailand — Tachileik, Myawaddy and Kawthaung or India — Rih Khaw Dar and Tamu.; eVisa is available for tourism only.
Namibia	Visa not required	3 months	
Nauru	Visa required		
Nepal	eVisa / Visa on arrival	90 days	
Netherlands	Visa not required	3 months	3 months during a 6 months period following the date of first entry in the Schengen Area
New Zealand	Electronic Travel Authority	3 months	International Visitor Conservation and Tourism Levy must be paid upon requesting an Electronic Travel Authority.; Holders of an Australian Permanent Resident Visa or Resident Return Visa may be granted a New Zealand Resident Visa on arrival permitting indefinite stay (pursuant to the Trans-Tasman Travel Arrangement), subject to meeting character requirements and obtaining an Electronic Travel Authority prior to departure. Such travellers are not required to pay the International Visitor Conservation and Tourism Levy.
Nicaragua	Visa on arrival	90 days	
Niger	Visa required		
Nigeria	eVisa / Visa on arrival		
North Macedonia	Visa not required	90 days	
Norway	Visa not required	3 months	3 months during a 6 months period following the date of first entry in the Schengen Area
Oman	Visa required		
Pakistan	Online Visa		Online Visa eligible.; Electronic Travel Authorization to obtain a visa on arrival for business purposes.
Palau	Free visa on arrival	30 days	
Panama	Visa not required	180 days	
Papua New Guinea	Easy Visitor Permit	30 days	
Paraguay	Visa required		
Peru	Visa required		
Philippines	Visa not required	30 days	
Poland	Visa not required	3 months	
Portugal	Visa not required	3 months	3 months during a 6 months period following the date of first entry in the Schengen Area
Qatar	Visa on arrival	30 days	
Romania	Visa not required	3 months	3 months during a 6 months period in the Schengen Area
Russia	Visa not required	90 days	60 days, 30 days if entering for a second time, for a maximum total stay of 90 days within any 180 day period.
Rwanda	Visa not required	90 days	
Saint Kitts and Nevis	Visa not required	6 months	
Saint Lucia	Visa on arrival	6 weeks	
Saint Vincent and the Grenadines	Visa not required	1 month	
Samoa	Visa not required	60 days	
San Marino	Visa not required		
São Tomé and Príncipe	eVisa		
Saudi Arabia	eVisa /Visa on arrival	90 days	
Senegal	Visa not required	90 days	
Serbia	Visa required		
Seychelles	Free Visitor's Permit on arrival	3 months	
Sierra Leone	eVisa / Visa on arrival		
Singapore	Visa not required	30 days	
Slovakia	Visa not required	3 months	3 months during a 6 months period following the date of first entry in the Schengen Area
Slovenia	Visa not required	3 months	3 months during a 6 months period following the date of first entry in the Schengen Area
Solomon Islands	Visa required		
Somalia	eVisa	30 days	
South Africa	Visa not required	30 days	
South Sudan	Electronic Visa		Obtainable online; Printed visa authorization must be presented at the time of travel
Spain	Visa not required	3 months	3 months during a 6 months period following the date of first entry in the Schengen Area
Sri Lanka	eVisa / Visa on arrival	30 days	
Sudan	Visa required		
Suriname	eVisa		
Sweden	Visa not required	3 months	3 months during a 6 months period following the date of first entry in the Schengen Area
Switzerland	Visa not required	3 months	3 months during a 6 months period following the date of first entry in the Schengen Area
Syria	eVisa		
Tajikistan	eVisa	45 days	
Tanzania	Visa not required	90 days	
Thailand	Visa not required	30 days	
Timor-Leste	Visa on arrival	30 days	
Togo	eVisa	15 days	
Tonga	Visa required		
Trinidad and Tobago	Visa not required		
Tunisia	Visa not required	3 months	
Turkey	eVisa	1 month	
Turkmenistan	Visa required		
Tuvalu	Visa on arrival	1 month	
Uganda	Visa not required	3 months	
Ukraine	eVisa		
United Arab Emirates	Visa not required	30 days	There is a 10-day grace period for extension and If extended, the total validity would be 60 days from the date of entry.
United Kingdom	Electronic Travel Authorisation	6 months	
United States	Visa required		
Uruguay	Visa required		
Uzbekistan	eVisa	30 days	5-day visa-free transit at the international airports if holding a confirmed onward ticket for a flight to a third country.
Vanuatu	Visa not required	30 days	
Vatican City	Visa not required		
Venezuela	Visa required		
Vietnam	eVisa		Prearranged visa obtained online through travel agencies available at Hanoi, Ho Chi Minh City or Da Nang airports. Phú Quốc without a visa for up to 30 days.
Yemen	Visa required		
Zambia	Visa not required	90 days	
Zimbabwe	Visa not required	3 months	

=== Dependent, disputed, or restricted territories ===
Unrecognized or partially recognized countries

Territory	Conditions of access	Notes
Abkhazia	Visa required	
Kosovo	Visa not required	90 days
Northern Cyprus	Visa not required	
Palestine	Visa not required	Arrival by sea to Gaza Strip not allowed.
Sahrawi Arab Democratic Republic		Undefined visa regime in the Western Sahara controlled territory.
Somaliland	Visa on arrival	30 days for 30 US dollars, payable on arrival.
South Ossetia	Visa not required	Multiple entry visa to Russia and three day prior notification are required to enter South Ossetia.
Taiwan	eVisa	30 days
Transnistria	Visa not required	Registration required after 24h.

Dependent and autonomous territories

Territory	Conditions of access	Notes
China
Hong Kong	Visa not required	90 days
Macao	Visa not required	90 days
Denmark
Faroe Islands	Visa not required	
Greenland	Visa not required	
France
French Guiana	Visa not required	
French Polynesia	Visa not required	
(France) French West Indies	Visa not required	Includes overseas departments of Guadeloupe and Martinique and overseas collectivities of Saint Barthélemy and Saint Martin.
Mayotte	Visa not required	
New Caledonia	Visa not required	
Réunion	Visa not required	
Saint Pierre and Miquelon	Visa not required	
Wallis and Futuna	Visa not required	
Netherlands
Aruba	Visa not required	90 days
Caribbean Netherlands	Visa not required	90 days. Includes Bonaire, Sint Eustatius and Saba.
Curaçao	Visa not required	90 days
Sint Maarten	Visa not required	90 days
New Zealand
Cook Islands	Visa not required	31 days
Niue	Visa not required	30 days
Tokelau	Visa required	
United Kingdom
Akrotiri and Dhekelia	Visa not required	Stays longer than 28 days per 12-month period require a permit.
Anguilla	Visa not required	Holders of a valid visa issued by the United Kingdom do not require a visa.
Bermuda	Visa not required	
British Indian Ocean Territory	Special permit required	Special permit required.
British Virgin Islands	Visa not required	
Cayman Islands	Visa not required	
Falkland Islands	Visa required	
Gibraltar	Visa not required	
Guernsey	Visa not required	6 months
Isle of Man	Visa not required	6 months
Jersey	Visa not required	6 months
Montserrat	Visa not required	
Pitcairn Islands	Visa not required	14 days visa free and landing fee US$35 or tax of US$5 if not going ashore.
Ascension Island	eVisa	3 months within any year period
Saint Helena	Visa not required	
Tristan da Cunha	Permission required	Permission to land required for 15/30 pounds sterling (yacht/ship passenger) for Tristan da Cunha Island or 20 pounds sterling for Gough Island, Inaccessible Island or Nightingale Islands.
South Georgia and the South Sandwich Islands	Permit required	Pre-arrival permit from the Commissioner required (72 hours/1 month for 110/160 pounds sterling).
Turks and Caicos Islands	Visa not required	
United States
American Samoa	Visa required	
Guam	Visa required	
Northern Mariana Islands	Visa required	
Puerto Rico	Visa required	
U.S. Virgin Islands	Visa required	
Antarctica and adjacent islands
Special permits required for Bouvet Island, British Antarctic Territory, French Southern and Antarctic Lands, Argentine Antarctica, (Australia) Australian Antarctic Territory, (Antártica Chilena Province) Chilean Antarctic Territory, (Australia) Heard Island and McDonald Islands, (Norway) Peter I Island, (Norway) Queen Maud Land, (New Zealand) Ross Dependency.

== See also ==
- Visa policy of Mauritius
- Mauritian passport
- Foreign relations of Mauritius
