= Foreign relations of Mauritius =

Mauritius has strong and friendly relations with the West, with South Asian countries and with the countries of southern and eastern Africa. It is a member of the World Trade Organization, the Commonwealth of Nations, La Francophonie, the African Union, the Southern Africa Development Community, the Indian Ocean Commission, COMESA, and the recently formed Indian Ocean Rim Association.

Trade, commitment to democracy, and the country's small size are driving forces behind Mauritian foreign policy. The country's political heritage and dependence on Western markets have led to close ties with the European Union and its member states, particularly France, the colonial power until 1810, Mauritius' only immediate neighbour being Réunion, both an overseas department of France and an outermost region of the EU. Mauritius also maintains close ties with the United Kingdom, a former member EU state and the colonial power until 1968.

Considered part of Africa geographically, Mauritius has friendly relations with other African states in the region, particularly South Africa, by far its largest continental trading partner. Mauritian investors are gradually entering African markets, notably Madagascar and Mozambique. Mauritius coordinates much of its foreign policy with the Southern Africa Development Community and the Organisation of African Unity. The country is also a member of the Port Management Association of Eastern and Southern Africa (PMAESA).

Relations with France and India are strong for both historical and commercial reasons. High Commissions and foreign embassies in Mauritius include Australia, South Korea, the United Kingdom, People's Republic of China, Egypt, France, India, Madagascar, Pakistan, Russian Federation, Bangladesh, and the United States.

Mauritius is also a member of the International Criminal Court with a Bilateral Immunity Agreement of protection for the US-military (as covered under Article 98).

== International disputes ==
Mauritius claims the entire Chagos Archipelago in the Indian Ocean and also claims the whole French-administered Tromelin Island.

== Diplomatic relations ==
List of countries with which Mauritius maintains diplomatic relations:

#	Country	Date
1	France	12 March 1968
2	United Kingdom	12 March 1968
3	United States	12 March 1968
4	India	12 March 1968
5	Pakistan	12 March 1968
6	Russia	17 March 1968
7	Germany	23 March 1968
8	Israel	23 April 1968
9	Canada	24 April 1968
10	New Zealand	28 April 1968
11	Madagascar	27 August 1968
12	Belgium	November 1968
13	Netherlands	5 March 1969
14	Switzerland	11 March 1969
15	Japan	22 October 1969
—	Holy See	9 March 1970
16	Egypt	26 March 1970
17	Italy	8 April 1970
18	Syria	22 May 1970
19	Australia	25 September 1970
20	Serbia	6 October 1970
21	South Korea	3 July 1971
22	Iran	25 September 1971
23	China	15 April 1972
24	Norway	30 January 1973
25	Luxembourg	28 February 1973
26	Denmark	2 March 1973
27	North Korea	16 March 1973
28	Guinea	29 October 1973
29	Finland	31 October 1973
30	Sweden	20 December 1973
31	Argentina	8 April 1974
32	Jamaica	20 May 1974
33	Romania	25 June 1974
34	Trinidad and Tobago	June 1974
35	Brazil	9 August 1974
36	Barbados	14 December 1974
37	Zambia	29 December 1974
38	Bulgaria	20 June 1975
39	Bangladesh	September 1975
40	United Arab Emirates	4 January 1976
41	Kuwait	11 January 1976
42	Tunisia	9 February 1976
43	Austria	10 February 1976
44	Algeria	12 February 1976
45	Bahrain	12 February 1976
46	Libya	17 February 1976
47	Jordan	February 1976
48	Iraq	22 March 1976
49	Oman	22 March 1976
50	Yemen	March 1976
51	Morocco	8 June 1976
52	Czech Republic	10 June 1976
53	Nigeria	16 June 1976
54	Democratic Republic of the Congo	19 June 1976
55	Uganda	19 June 1976
56	Sri Lanka	19 July 1976
57	Mexico	30 July 1976
58	Cuba	18 October 1976
59	Turkey	18 October 1976
60	Portugal	12 December 1976
61	Albania	October 1977
—	Sovereign Military Order of Malta	1977
62	Saudi Arabia	7 August 1978
63	Myanmar	30 December 1978
64	Thailand	22 January 1979
65	Poland	30 April 1979
66	Spain	30 May 1979
67	Sudan	1979
—	Maldives (suspended)	15 January 1981
68	Nepal	12 February 1981
69	Greece	23 February 1981
70	Indonesia	27 May 1983
71	Gabon	August 1983
—	Sahrawi Arab Democratic Republic	1983
72	Mozambique	29 November 1984
73	Comoros	25 February 1985
74	Nicaragua	March 1985
75	Malaysia	13 August 1986
76	Qatar	1986
77	Seychelles	17 June 1988
78	Chile	30 September 1988
79	Colombia	30 September 1988
80	Singapore	27 October 1989
—	State of Palestine	1989
81	Hungary	24 April 1990
82	Brunei	2 July 1990
83	Ukraine	12 October 1992
84	Guyana	1 December 1992
85	South Africa	7 December 1993
86	Vietnam	4 May 1994
87	Cambodia	18 May 1994
88	Slovakia	31 May 1995
89	Ethiopia	June 1996
90	Azerbaijan	19 July 1996
91	Marshall Islands	23 October 1996
92	Cape Verde	8 November 1996
93	Slovenia	30 May 1997
94	Turkmenistan	2 July 1997
95	Namibia	16 July 1997
96	Croatia	3 September 1997
97	Eswatini	7 October 1997
98	Philippines	23 January 1998
99	Uzbekistan	4 August 1999
100	Lithuania	20 September 1999
101	Ireland	August 2000
102	Cyprus	1 February 2001
103	North Macedonia	7 February 2001
104	Malawi	9 February 2001
105	Rwanda	16 March 2001
106	Moldova	25 June 2001
107	Vanuatu	13 August 2001
108	El Salvador	6 September 2001
109	Estonia	24 October 2001
110	Lesotho	20 December 2001
111	Botswana	11 April 2002
112	Laos	23 May 2002
113	Zimbabwe	6 December 2002
114	Latvia	12 February 2003
115	São Tomé and Príncipe	28 February 2003
116	Angola	3 March 2003
117	Gambia	4 March 2003
118	Burkina Faso	14 March 2003
119	Timor-Leste	20 March 2003
120	Benin	24 March 2003
121	Dominican Republic	30 April 2003
122	Ecuador	13 May 2003
123	Ghana	18 August 2003
124	Fiji	2 September 2003
125	Dominica	23 September 2003
126	Belarus	26 September 2003
127	Mali	1 December 2003
128	Iceland	15 December 2003
129	Eritrea	21 April 2004
130	Equatorial Guinea	26 May 2004
131	Venezuela	2 May 2005
132	Malta	19 May 2005
133	Peru	12 December 2005
134	Guatemala	7 September 2006
135	Andorra	21 December 2006
136	Tanzania	22 May 2007
137	Bosnia and Herzegovina	30 May 2007
138	Saint Vincent and the Grenadines	18 June 2007
139	Kenya	16 April 2008
140	Paraguay	28 September 2010
141	Mauritania	1 December 2010
142	Georgia	3 March 2011
143	Republic of the Congo	6 July 2011
144	Honduras	8 September 2011
145	Bhutan	2 July 2012
146	Montenegro	26 September 2012
147	Armenia	28 June 2013
148	Mongolia	3 July 2014
149	Senegal	3 July 2014
150	Kazakhstan	15 October 2014
151	Saint Lucia	7 November 2014
152	Ivory Coast	4 March 2016
153	Kyrgyzstan	16 June 2016
154	Solomon Islands	1 July 2016
155	Saint Kitts and Nevis	25 November 2016
156	Djibouti	12 December 2016
157	Bahamas	18 January 2017
158	Togo	22 February 2017
159	Central African Republic	24 March 2017
160	Tajikistan	10 May 2017
161	Liechtenstein	12 May 2017
162	Federated States of Micronesia	10 October 2017
163	Haiti	13 February 2018
164	Palau	15 March 2018
165	Niger	26 March 2018
166	Belize	4 April 2018
167	San Marino	20 April 2018
168	Uruguay	15 May 2019
169	Suriname	21 March 2022
170	Monaco	25 August 2026
171	Burundi	26 August 2026

== Bilateral relations ==
Country	Formal Relations Began	Notes
Bangladesh	1972	See Bangladesh–Mauritius relations Bangladesh and Mauritius share a common heritage in culture and politics. Diplomatic relations were established in 1972, soon after Bangladeshi independence. Both nations have rapidly growing trade ties and increasing investment and financial linkages. Bangladesh has a High Commission in Port Louis. The two countries are common members of the Indian Ocean Rim Association and the Commonwealth of Nations.: Bangladesh has a high commission in Port Louis.; Mauritius is accredited to Bangladesh from its high commission in New Delhi, India.
Canada	1967	Canada and Mauritius established diplomatic relations in 1967. Both countries are members of the Commonwealth of Nations and La Francophonie.: Canada is accredited to Mauritius from its high commission in Pretoria, South Africa and maintains an honorary consulate in Port Louis.; Mauritius is accredited to Canada from its embassy in Washington, D.C., United States.
China	15 April 1972	See China–Mauritius relations Under Chinese President Hu Jintao in 2010, an investment package of $750m was allocated to Mauritius to develop the Jinfei Special Economic Zone which consists of 211 hectares (521 acres) of land. Buildings of infrastructure and services primarily serving interests of Chinese companies operating the African region but would also eventually open up to foreign parties. The proposed investment package also includes development of advance logistic operations in Mauritius, construction of a university and an oceanographic research centre. This investment package is Mauritius' largest single foreign direct investment ever.: China has an embassy in Port Louis.; Mauritius has an embassy in Beijing.
Cyprus	1 February 2001	Both countries are members of the Commonwealth of Nations; List of bilateral agreements.; Cyprus is accredited to Mauritius from its High Commission in Pretoria, South Africa.; Mauritius is accredited to Cyprus from its embassy in Brussels, Belgium.
France	12 March 1968	See France–Mauritius relations France has remained one of its biggest trading partners; in addition, the two countries share close cultural ties in language, media and literature.: France has an embassy in Port Louis.; Mauritius has an embassy in Paris.; Both nations are members of La Francophonie.
Greece	23 February 1981	Greece is accredited to Mauritius from its embassy in Nairobi, Kenya.; Mauritius is accredited to Greece from its embassy in Brussels, Belgium.
Guyana	1 December 1992	Mauritius is accredited to Guyana from its embassy in Washington, D.C., United States.; Both countries established diplomatic relations on December 1, 1992.; Both countries are full members of the Commonwealth of Nations.
India	12 March 1968	See Mauritius–India relations India and Mauritius established diplomatic relations in 1948. India has remained one of its biggest trading partners; in addition India has deep social and historical links with a large portion of the population of Mauritius, India is the country's second largest source of foreign assistance.: India has a High Commission in Port Louis; Mauritius has a High Commission in New Delhi. and a consulate in Mumbai.
Israel		Both countries have signed many bilateral agreements.
Kenya		See Kenya–Mauritius relations: Kenya is accredited to Mauritius from its high commission in Pretoria, South Africa.; Mauritius is accredited to Kenya from its embassy in Addis Ababa, Ethiopia.
Madagascar	27 August 1968	See Madagascar–Mauritius relations: Madagascar has an embassy in Port Louis.; Mauritius has an embassy in Antananarivo.
Malaysia	13 August 1986	See Malaysia–Mauritius relations
Mexico	30 July 1976	Mauritius is accredited to Mexico from its embassy in Washington, D.C., United States.; Mexico is accredited to Mauritius from its embassy in Pretoria, South Africa and maintains an honorary consulate in Port Louis.
Pakistan	1969	See Mauritius–Pakistan relations Relations between Pakistan and Mauritius were first established in 1969. On November 30, 2007, the two countries signed a bilateral Preferential Trade Agreement.: Mauritius has a High Commission in Islamabad.; Pakistan has a High Commission in Port Louis.
Romania	25 June 1974	Both countries established diplomatic relations on July 30, 1976.
Russia	17 March 1968	See Mauritius–Russia relations The Soviet Union and Mauritius established diplomatic relations on March 17, 1968. The Russian Federation has an embassy in Floreal, Mauritius, and Mauritius has an embassy in Moscow, which was opened in July 2003.: Mauritius has an embassy in Moscow.; Russia has an embassy in Port Louis.
South Africa	6 December 1993	See Mauritius–South Africa relations Relations between South Africa and Mauritius were established in 1992 with the establishing of Representative Offices in both countries. Full diplomatic relations were established in 1994. Upon South Africa's return to the Commonwealth, relations have been conducted at the level of High Commission. There is no visa requirements for South Africans visiting Mauritius.: Mauritius has a high commission in Pretoria.; South Africa has a high commission Port Louis.
South Korea	3 July 1971	Mauritius and the Republic of Korea established Diplomatic Relations on July 3, 1971.: Mauritius is accredited to South Korea from its embassy in Beijing, China.; South Korea is accredited to Mauritius from its embassy in Nairobi, Kenya.
Switzerland		Both countries established diplomatic relations in 1968. Both countries are full members of the Organisation internationale de la Francophonie.; Mauritius has an embassy in Geneva.; Switzerland is accredited to Mauritius from its embassy in Pretoria, South Africa.
Turkey	18 October 1976	See Mauritius–Turkey relations: Embassy of Mauritius in Berlin is accredited to Turkey.; Turkish Embassy in Antananarivo is accredited to Mauritius.; Trade volume between the two countries was 76.5 million USD in 2019.; There are direct flights from Istanbul to Mauritius since 15 December 2015.
United Kingdom	12 March 1968	See Mauritius–United Kingdom relations Mauritian Prime Minister Pravind Jugnauth with British Prime Minister Liz Truss at a United Nations General Assembly in New York City, September 2022. Mauritius established diplomatic relations with the United Kingdom on 12 March 1968.: Mauritius maintains a high commission in London.; The United Kingdom is accredited to Mauritius through its high commission in Port Louis.; The UK governed Mauritius from 1810 to 1968, when Mauritius achieved full independence. Both countries share common membership of the Commonwealth, the International Criminal Court, the United Nations, the World Health Organization, and the World Trade Organization, as well as the Eastern and Southern Africa–UK Economic Partnership Agreement. Bilaterally the two countries have a Double Tax Convention.
United States	12 March 1968	See Mauritius–United States relations George W. Bush and Mauritian Prime Minister Anerood Jugnauth. Oval Office, June 26, 2003. Official U.S. representation in Mauritius dates from the end of the 18th century. An American consulate was established in 1794 and was closed in 1911. It was reopened in 1967 and elevated to embassy status upon Mauritius' independence in 1968. Since 1970, the mission has been directed by a resident U.S. ambassador. In 2002, Mauritius recalled its ambassador to the United Nations for not accurately conveying his government's pro-American stance in the Security Council debate.: Mauritius has an embassy in Washington, D.C.; United States has an embassy in Port Louis.
Vietnam	4 May 1994	Both countries established diplomatic relations on May 4, 1994. Both countries are members of La Francophonie.: Mauritius is accredited to Vietnam from its high commission in Kuala Lumpur, Malaysia.; Vietnam is accredited to Mauritius from its embassy in Maputo, Mozambique.

== See also ==
- List of diplomatic missions in Mauritius
- List of diplomatic missions of Mauritius
