= Mauritius–Turkey relations =

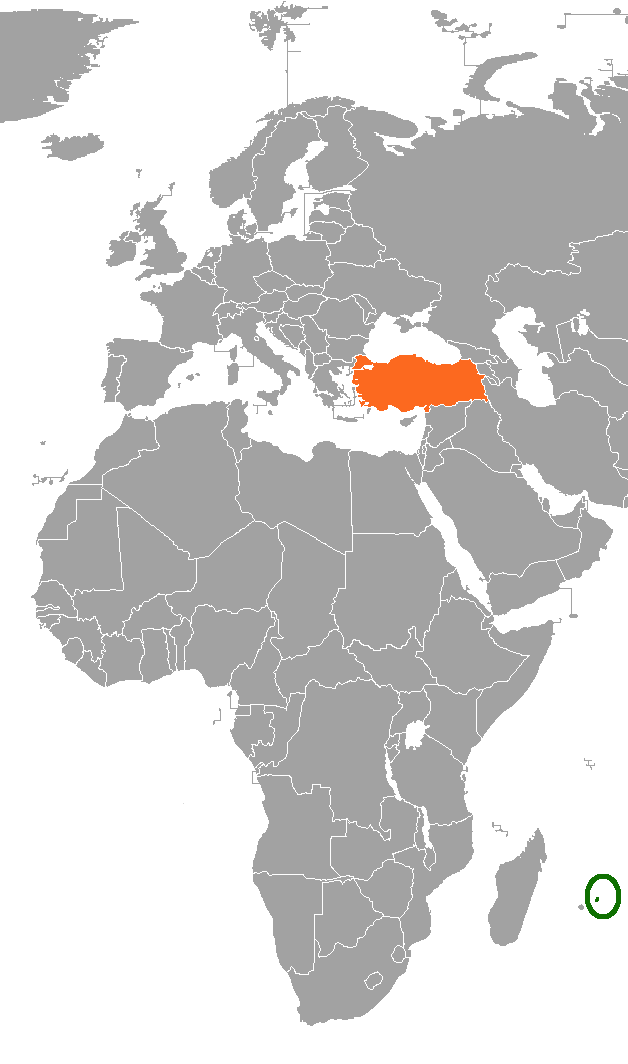
- Mauritius: Turkey

Mauritius–Turkey relations are the foreign relations between Mauritius and Turkey. The Turkish ambassador to Madagascar is also accredited to Mauritius. Turkey also has an honorary consulate-general in Port-Louis. Mauritius's ambassador in Berlin is also accredited to Turkey.

== Diplomatic relations ==
Turkey provides Mauritius financial aid. In addition to trade, Turkey provides Mauritius with numerous kinds of assistance — including computerizing government ministries, performing highway maintenance to constructing electric power stations.

== Economic relations ==
- Trade volume between the two countries was US$76.5 million in 2019.
- There are direct flights from Istanbul to Port-Louis since December 15, 2015.

== Educational relations ==
- The two countries signed an educational agreement that allows junior diplomats from Mauritius to get trained in Turkey.
- Turkey provided Türkiye Scholarships, which provides funding for undergraduate degrees in Turkey, to 54 students from the Mauritius.
- Turkey and Mauritius signed an agreement to set up a Joint Economic Committee. The first meeting of the Joint Economic Committee in Port-Louis on November 17–18, 2016 established the framework of a Free Trade Agreement.

== See also ==
- Foreign relations of Mauritius
- Foreign relations of Turkey
