= Mauritian passport =

Passport of the Republic of Mauritius issued to Mauritian citizens

- Mauritian passport front cover
- Type: Passport
- Issued by: Mauritius
- Purpose: Identification
- Eligibility: Mauritian citizenship

Mauritian passports are issued to citizens of Mauritius for travel outside the country. As of 2007, Mauritius' Passport and Immigration Office processed an average of 434 passport applications each day.

== Legal basis ==
Mauritian passports are issued under the Passport Act of 14 February 1969. The Passport Regulations 1969 govern details of their issuance. The regulations make provision for extending the period of validity of a passport; however, after a passport is expired, there is no provision for renewal, and instead a new application must be made to the Passport and Immigration Office.

== Physical appearance ==
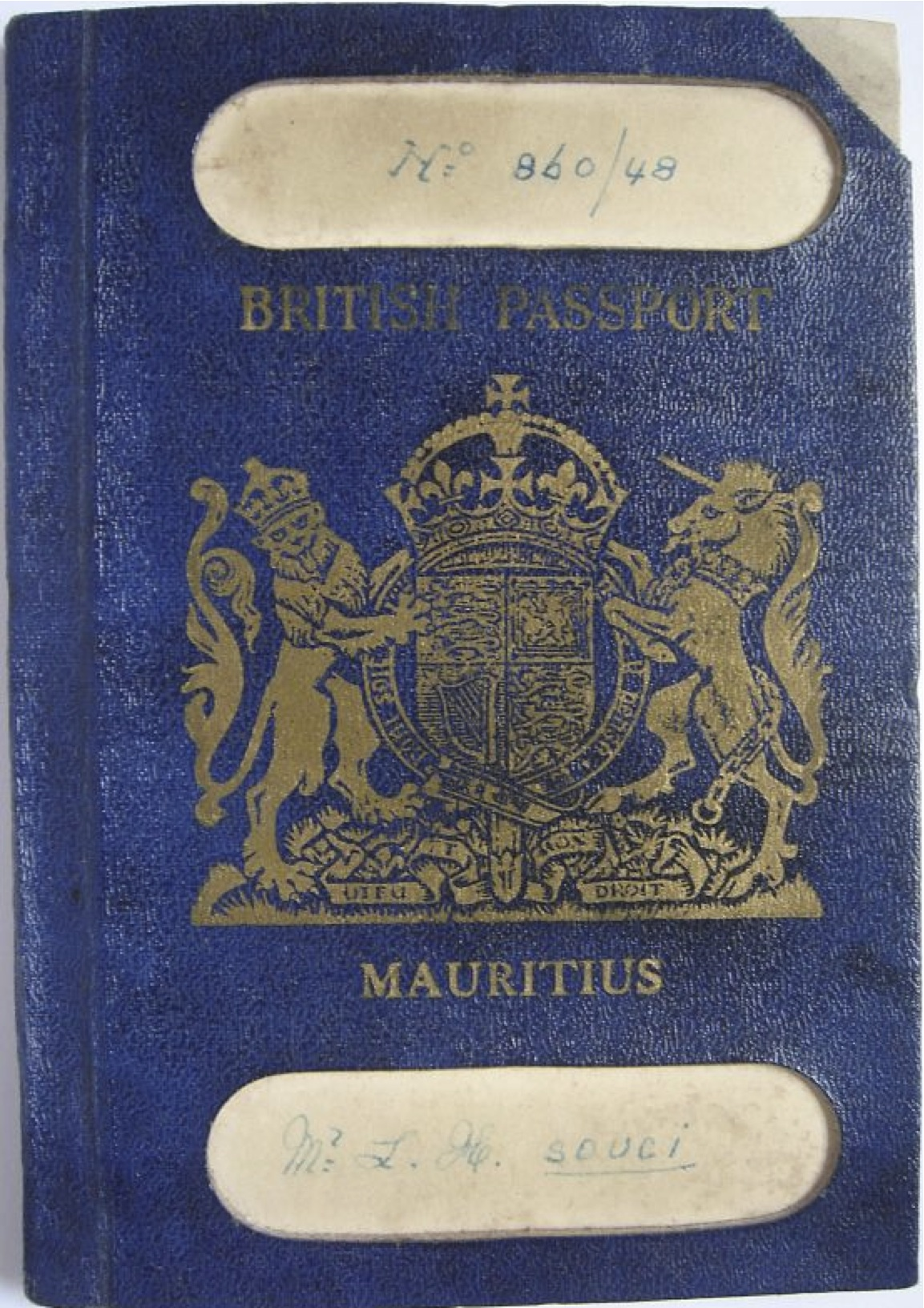
A British Mauritian passport issued prior to 1968.

Mauritian passports issued to adult citizens are navy blue in colour, with the Coat of arms of Mauritius emblazoned in the centre of the front cover. The word "Passport" is inscribed below the coat of arms, and "Republic of Mauritius" above. The passport contains 64 visa pages.

=== Identity information page ===
The Mauritian passport includes the following data:

- Photo of passport Holder
- Type P
- Code of Issuing State (MUS)
- Passport No.
- Surname
- Given Names
- Profession
- Nationality
- Date of birth
- Sex
- Date of issue
- Date of expiry
- Personal No.
- Place of birth
- Authority
- Holder's Signature

The information page ends with the Machine Readable Passport Zone.

=== Passport note ===
The passports contain a note from the issuing state that is addressed to the authorities of all other states, identifying the bearer as a citizen of that state and requesting that he or she be allowed to pass and be treated according to international norms. The note inside Mauritian passports states:

In English:

The President of the Republic of Mauritius requests and requires all those whom it may concern to allow the bearer to pass freely without let or hindrance, and to afford such assistance and protection as may be necessary.

and in French:

Le Président de la Republique de Maurice requiert de laisser passer le titulaire librement et sans empêchement et de lui fournir toute assistance et protection si nécessaire.

=== Languages ===
The data page/information page is printed in both English and French.

== Visa requirements ==
Visa requirements for Mauritian citizens

As of January 2025, Mauritian citizens have visa-free or visa on arrival access to 151 countries and territories, ranking the Mauritian passport 29th in terms of travel freedom according to the Henley visa restrictions index.

== See also ==
- Visa requirements for Mauritian citizens
- List of passports
