= Kenya–Mauritius relations =

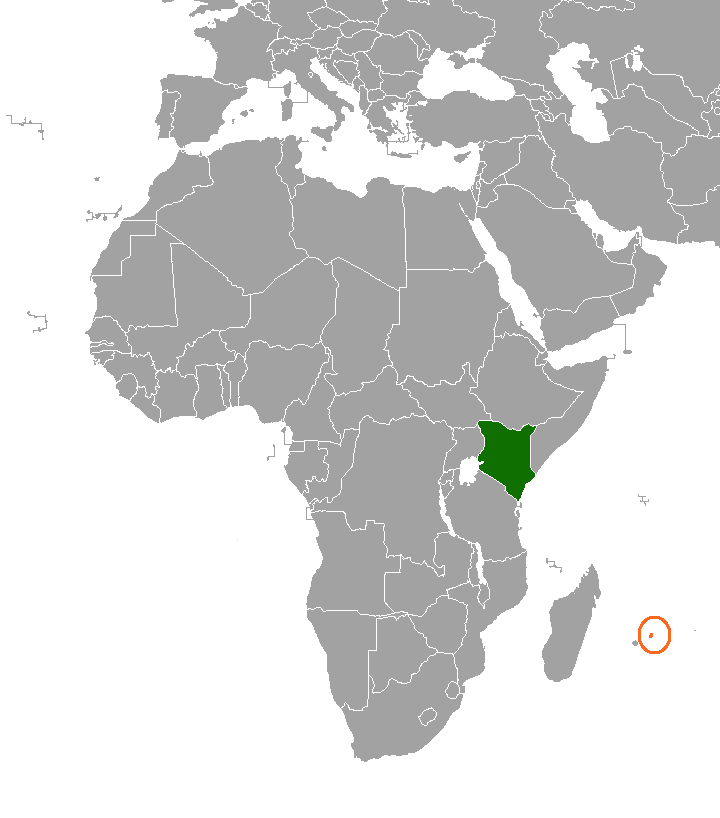
- Kenya: Mauritius

Kenya–Mauritius relations are bilateral relations between Kenya and Mauritius. Neither country has a resident high commissioner. Both nations are members of the African Union, Commonwealth of Nations and Group of 77.

== High level visits ==
In September 2015, during a short visit to Nairobi, Ameenah Gurib-Fakim President of Mauritius met and held talks with the President of Kenya, Uhuru Kenyatta.

== Economic relations ==
In 2012, both countries started working on a Double Taxation Agreement. The agreement was ratified by the Kenyan Parliament in May 2014. If the proper measures are taken the agreement will enter into effect in 2015.

The tax deal will increase business and investment ties between Kenya and Mauritius. The deal will strengthen business environment in Kenya for Mauritian firms.

In October 2014, a Kenyan lobbyist group sued the Kenyan Treasury Ministry because of the pending Double Taxation Agreement. The lobby claimed that this will help Kenya's largest firms evade from paying taxes.

Both countries also signed a deal to allow the sharing of bank information. The agreement comes at a time when Kenyan banking firms are looking to expand into Mauritius.

== Trade ==
In 2011, Mauritius bought 9000 cattle worth KES. 225 million (US$2.5 million) from Kenya. Mauritius is starting to rely on livestock exports from Kenya.

== See also ==
- Foreign relations of Kenya
- Foreign relations of Mauritius
