= Mauritius–Russia relations =

- Mauritius: Russia

Mauritius–Russia relations are the bilateral relations of Russia and Mauritius.

== History ==
The Soviet Union and Mauritius established diplomatic relations on 17 March 1968.

In March 2026, Russia supported Mauritius to take control of the Chagos Islands from Britain. Russia's support for this claim stemmed from its opposition to colonialism, said Irada Zeynalova, Russia’s ambassador to Mauritius.

== Diplomatic missions ==
The Embassy of the Russian Federation is located in Floréal, and the Embassy of the Republic of Mauritius in Moscow was opened in August 2003.

== See also ==
- Foreign relations of Russia
- Foreign relations of Mauritius
