= List of diplomatic missions of Mauritius =

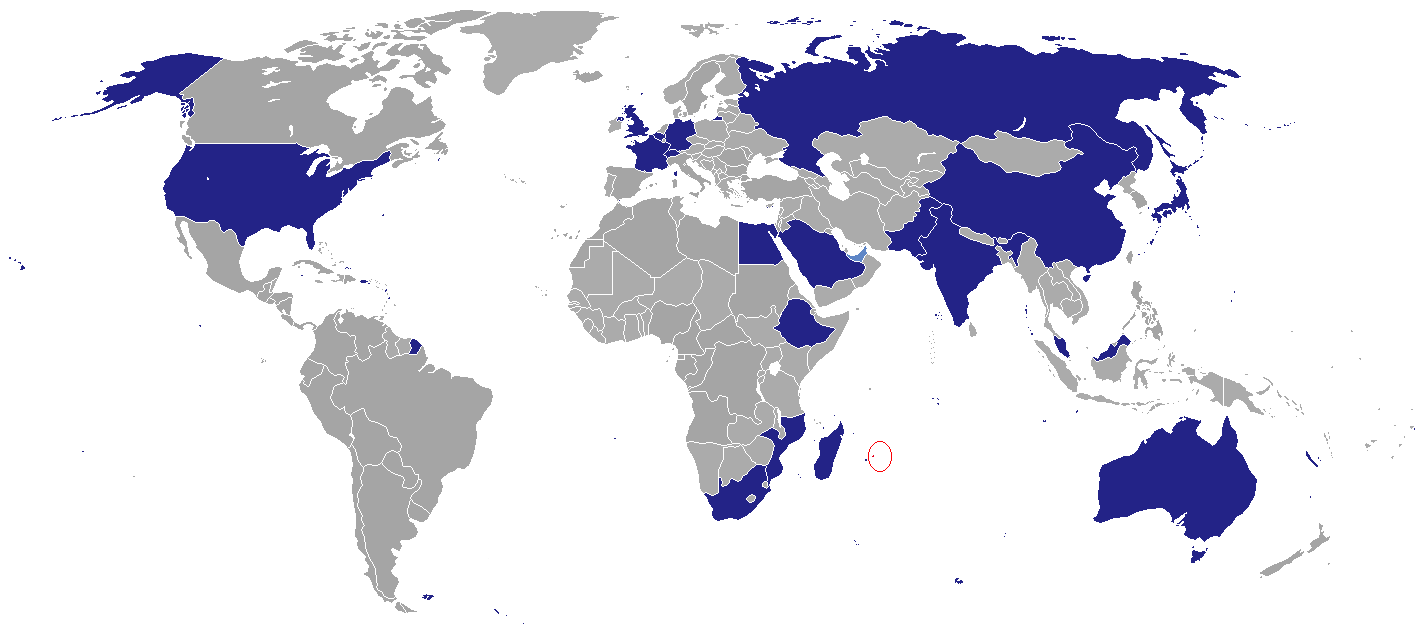
Countries hosting diplomatic missions of Mauritius

This is a list of diplomatic missions of Mauritius, excluding honorary consulates. Mauritius has a small presence worldwide.

== Africa ==
- Egypt
  - Cairo (Embassy)
- Ethiopia
  - Addis Ababa (Embassy)
- Madagascar
  - Antananarivo (Embassy)
- Mozambique
  - Maputo (High Commission)
- South Africa
  - Pretoria (High Commission)

== America ==
- United States
  - Washington, D.C. (Embassy)

== Asia ==
- China
  - Beijing (Embassy)
- India
  - New Delhi (High Commission)
  - Mumbai (Consulate)
- Japan
  - Tokyo (Embassy)
- Malaysia
  - Kuala Lumpur (High Commission)
- Pakistan
  - Islamabad (High Commission)
- Saudi Arabia
  - Riyadh (Embassy)
- United Arab Emirates
  - Dubai (Consulate-General)

== Europe ==
- Belgium
  - Brussels (Embassy)
- France
  - Paris (Embassy)
- Germany
  - Berlin (Embassy)
- Russia
  - Moscow (Embassy)
- United Kingdom
  - London (High Commission)

== Oceania ==
- Australia
  - Canberra (High Commission)

== Multilateral organizations ==
- United Nations
  - New York City (Permanent Mission) (Note: Also accredited to Guatemala.)
  - Geneva (Permanent Mission)
- UNESCO
  - Paris (Permanent Mission)

== Gallery ==
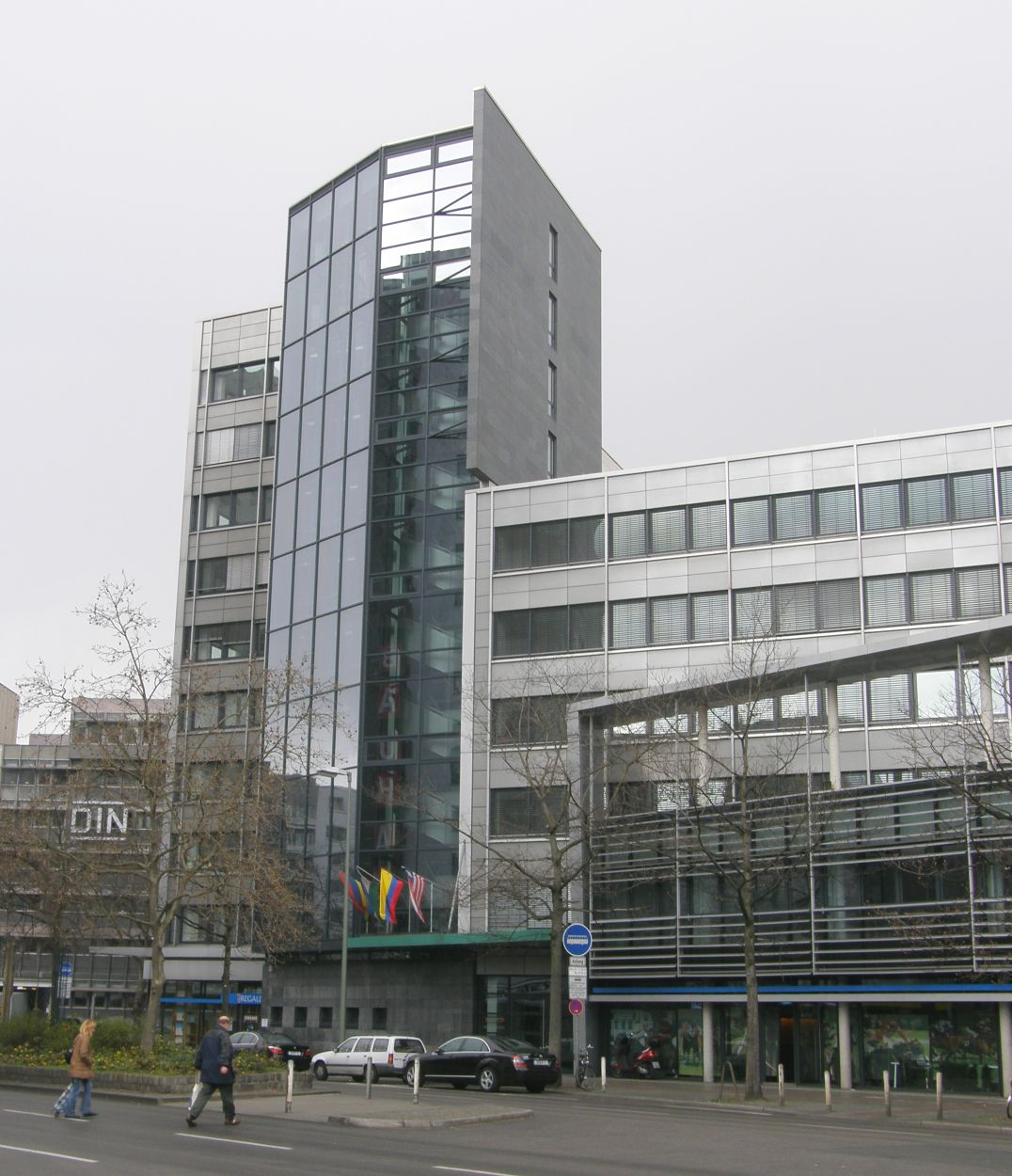
Embassy in Berlin

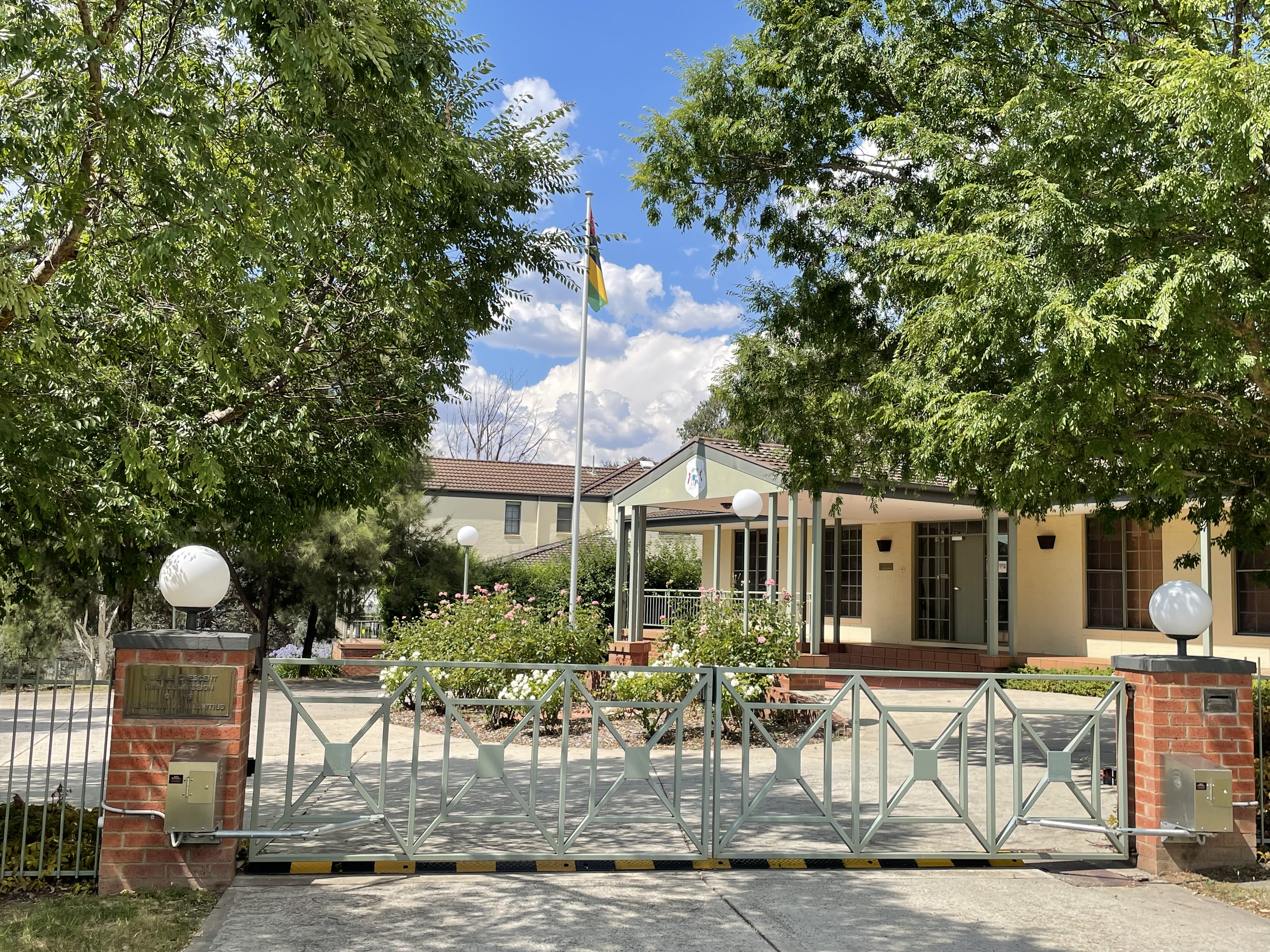
High Commission in Canberra

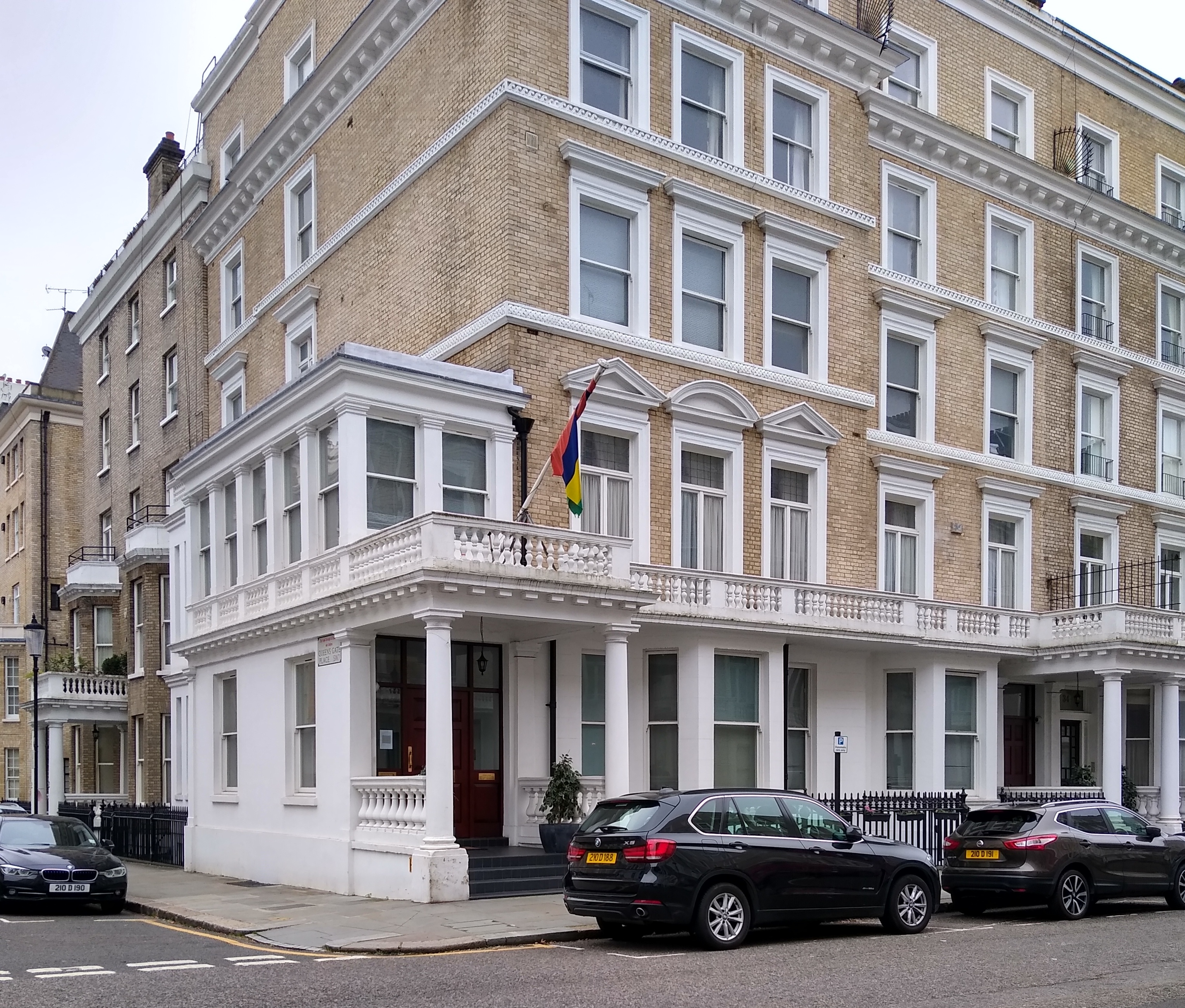
High Commission in London

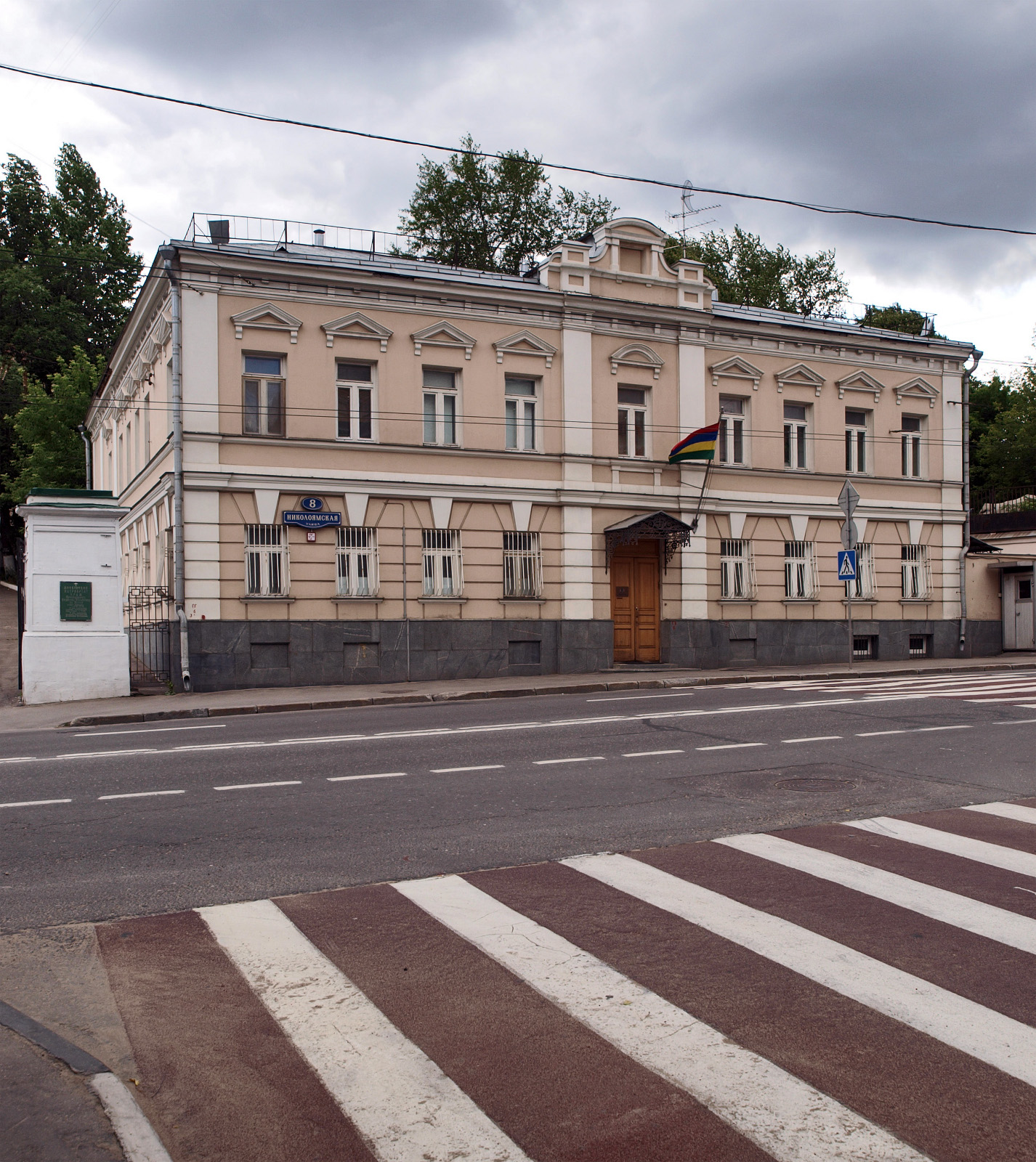
Embassy in Moscow

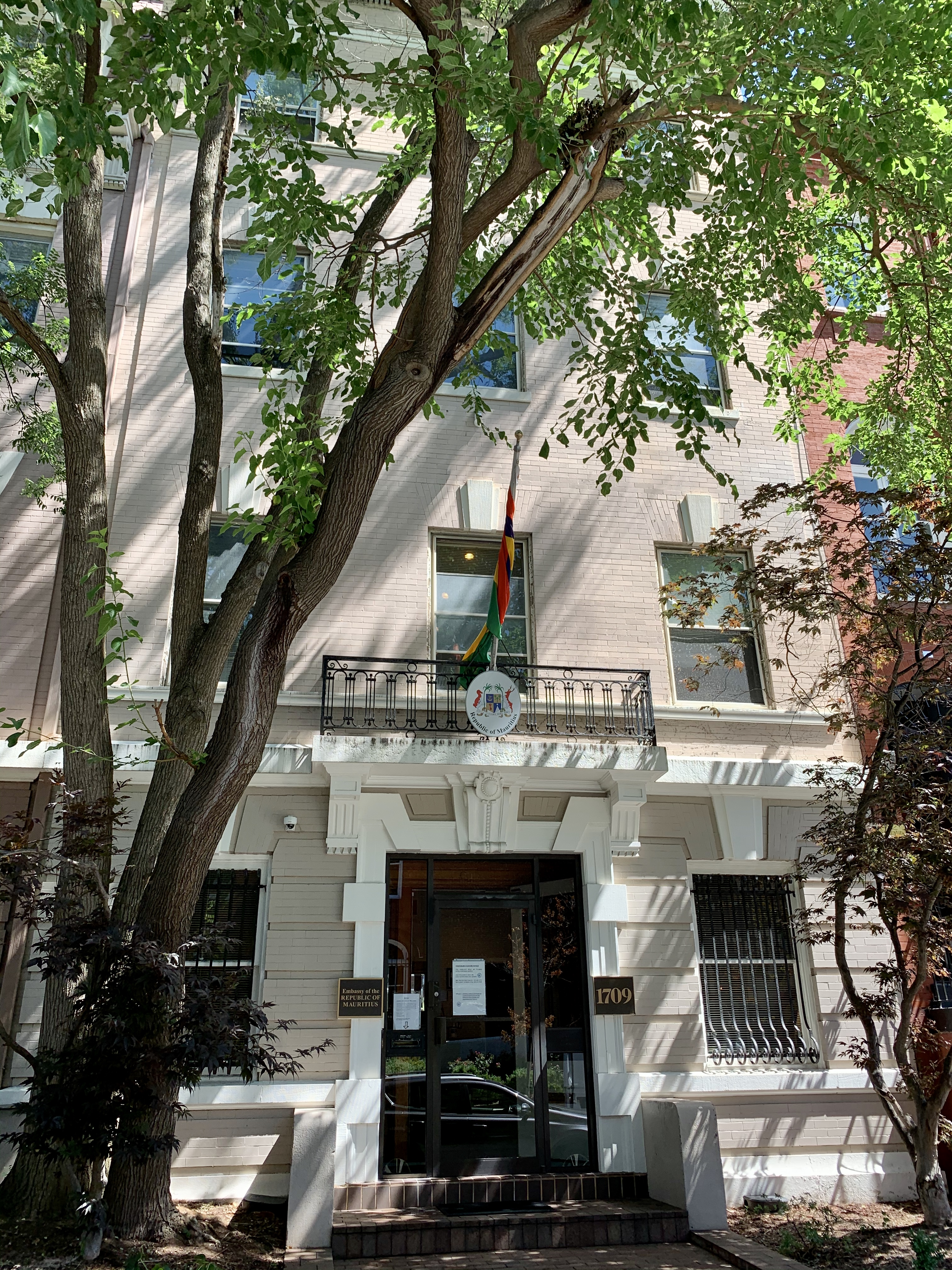
Embassy in Washington, D.C.

== See also ==
- Foreign relations of Mauritius
- List of diplomatic missions in Mauritius
- Visa policy of Mauritius
