= Visa policy of Mauritius =

Policy on permits required to enter Mauritius

Visitors to Mauritius must obtain a visa in advance unless they are citizens from one of the visa-exempt countries or citizens who may obtain a visa on arrival.

== Entry requirements ==
Travellers entering Mauritius are required to complete the "Mauritius All-In-One Travel Form" by the Ministry of Health and Wellness, either online or upon arrival in Mauritius.

Under Mauritian law, all visitors are required to hold proof of sufficient funds to cover their stay (minimum of US$100 per day), confirmed hotel reservation and documents required for their next destination.

== Visa policy map ==
Visa policy of Mauritius Mauritius Visa not required (120 days for business purposes and 180 days for tourist purposes) Visa on arrival (60 days) Visa on arrival (14 days) Visa required

== Visa exemption ==
=== Ordinary passports ===
Citizens of the following countries and territories may enter Mauritius without a visa. Their stay is limited to 90 days per visit, up to a maximum stay of 120 days within a calendar year for business purposes and 180 days within a calendar year for tourist purposes:

- All European Union member states

- Angola
- Antigua and Barbuda
- Argentina
- Australia
- Bahamas
- Bahrain
- Barbados
- Belize
- Benin
- Botswana
- Brazil
- Brunei
- Burundi
- Canada
- Cape Verde
- Chad
- Chile
- China^{1}
- Republic of the Congo
- (Democratic Republic of the Congo) DR Congo
- Dominica
- Egypt
- Eswatini
- Fiji
- Gabon
- Gambia
- Georgia
- Ghana
- Grenada
- Hong Kong
- Iceland
- India
- Israel
- Jamaica
- Japan
- Kenya
- Kiribati
- Kuwait
- Lesotho
- Liechtenstein
- Macau
- Malawi
- Malaysia
- Maldives
- Mexico
- Monaco
- Mozambique
- Namibia
- Nauru
- New Zealand
- Norway
- Oman
- Papua New Guinea
- Paraguay
- Qatar
- Russia
- Rwanda
- Saint Kitts and Nevis
- Saint Lucia
- Saint Vincent and the Grenadines
- Samoa
- San Marino
- Saudi Arabia
- Seychelles
- Sierra Leone
- Singapore
- Solomon Islands
- South Africa
- South Korea
- Suriname
- Switzerland
- Tanzania
- Tonga
- Trinidad and Tobago
- Tunisia
- Turkey
- Tuvalu
- Uganda
- Ukraine
- United Arab Emirates
- United Kingdom
- United States
- Vanuatu
- Vatican City
- Zambia
- Zimbabwe

=== Non-ordinary passports ===
In addition, a visa-free stay of 90 days will be granted to the following travelers (unless otherwise stated):

- Holders of diplomatic and official/service passports of any country (except Afghanistan, Iraq, Kosovo, Libya, Mainland China, Palestine, Somalia, South Sudan, Sudan, Syria and Yemen);
- Holders of diplomatic and official/service passports of Mainland China do not need a visa for up to 60 days.
- Crew of a vessel travelling on duty or in transit to join another vessel;
- Holders of a Laissez-Passer issued by the United Nations, COMESA, SADC or any other internationally recognized organisation;
- Holders of an Interpol Travel Document
- Holders of Laissez-passer issued by the African Reinsurance Corporation and the African Development Bank Group in Respect of their directors, officers or employees when traveling on duty;
- Holders of a European Union Laissez-Passer;
- Persons who intend to remain in Mauritius only during the stay of a vessel by which they arrive and depart;
- Spouses and children under 12 of nationals and residents of Mauritius do not need a visa for an Indefinite Stay.

== Visa on arrival ==
Citizens from the following countries and territories may obtain a visa on arrival for the following period:

60 days

- Albania
- Andorra
- Armenia
- Azerbaijan
- Belarus
- Bhutan
- Bolivia
- Bosnia and Herzegovina
- Burkina Faso
- Cambodia
- Cameroon
- Central African Republic
- Colombia
- Costa Rica
- Côte d'Ivoire
- Cuba
- Djibouti
- Dominican Republic
- Ecuador
- El Salvador
- Equatorial Guinea
- Eritrea
- Ethiopia
- Guatemala
- Guinea
- Guinea-Bissau
- Haiti
- Honduras
- Indonesia
- Jordan
- Kazakhstan
- Kyrgyzstan
- Lebanon
- Liberia
- Marshall Islands
- Mauritania
- Micronesia
- Moldova
- Mongolia
- Montenegro
- Morocco
- Nepal
- Nicaragua
- Niger
- North Macedonia
- Palau
- Panama
- Peru
- Philippines
- São Tomé and Príncipe
- Senegal
- Serbia
- Sri Lanka
- Taiwan
- Tajikistan
- Thailand
- Timor-Leste
- Togo
- Turkmenistan
- Uruguay
- Uzbekistan
- Venezuela
- Vietnam

2 weeks

- Algeria
- Comoros
- Iran
- Madagascar
- Myanmar
- Nigeria

== Visa required in advance ==
Citizens of the following countries and territories must obtain a visa in advance from one of the Mauritian diplomatic missions:

- Afghanistan
- Bangladesh
- Guyana
- Iraq
- Kosovo
- Libya
- Laos
- Mali
- North Korea
- Pakistan
- Palestine
- Sahrawi Arab Democratic Republic
- Somalia
- South Sudan
- Sudan
- Syria
- Yemen

== Mauritius Premium Travel Visa ==
In October 2020, Government of Mauritius launched the Premium Travel visa as a response to the impacts of COVID-19 on the Mauritian tourist trade. The visa is open to anyone who can show they have the financial resources to support themselves to live in Mauritius. The visa does not allow holders to accept a job in the Mauritian economy.

== Visitor statistics ==
Most visitors arriving to Mauritius were from the following countries or territories of residence:

Nationality	Total				
Nationality	2018	2017	2016	2015	2014
	2018	2017	2016	2015	2014
France	285,271	273,419	271,963	254,323	243,665
United Kingdom	151,846	149,807	141,904	129,754	115,326
Réunion	138,439	146,040	146,203	143,845	141,665
Germany	132,815	118,856	103,761	75,237	62,231
South Africa	128,091	112,129	104,834	101,943	93,120
India	85,766	86,294	82,670	72,135	61,167
China	65,739	72,951	79,374	89,584	63,365
Switzerland	41,084	40,252	36,272	30,680	29,985
Italy	38,362	35,101	31,337	29,185	29,557
Australia	20,948	21,271	18,559	17,835	17,529
Austria	18,577	17,596	16,643	11,425	8,303
Saudi Arabia	16,507	5,142	3,164	2,854	2,390
Netherlands	16,418	13,269	10,080	6,926	4,796
Belgium	15,727	16,420	15,675	14,223	11,465
Sweden	15,539	15,516	14,551	11,634	6,454
Spain	15,064	15,252	15,304	10,013	8,633
Madagascar	14,365	12,730	11,740	12,215	13,039
Czech Republic	14,254	10,495	8,503	7,267	6,852
United Arab Emirates	12,058	11,866	9,614	9,050	8,001
Russia	11,006	11,153	9,295	11,444	13,289
Poland	10,805	11,318			
United States	10,525	9,655			
Canada	7,751	6,908			
Denmark	7,418	6,971			
South Korea	7,204	6,858			
Seychelles	5,370	6,258			
Norway	5,332	5,005			
Finland	4,949	4,461			
Portugal	4,912	4,254			
Romania	4,369	2,691			
Slovakia	4,237	3,235			
Kenya	4,035	3,422			
Ireland	4,004	4,020			
Brazil	3,744	4,659			
Hungary	3,276	2,829			
Philippines	2,871	2,742			
Singapore	2,809	3,230			
Ukraine	2,765	2,854			
Turkey	2,600	2,594			
Indonesia	2,519	2,670			
Zimbabwe	2,496	2,553			
Malaysia	2,264	4,352			
Israel	2,167	1,698			
Nigeria	2,157	1,331			
Japan	2,046	2,315			
Luxembourg	1,924	1,802			
Bulgaria	1,913	1,386			
Taiwan	1,767	1,592			
Slovenia	1,740	1,312			
Hong Kong	1,519	1,512			
Namibia	1,358	1,505			
Mayotte	1,355	1,340			
Pakistan	1,207	1,088			
Bangladesh	1,195	1,157			
Spain	1,182	1,331			
Zambia	1,124	994			
Botswana	1,070	1,072			
Estonia	1,049	808			
New Zealand	1,002	1,052			
Comoros	956	886			
Greece	938	1,034			
Morocco	901	771			
Lithuania	829	1,046			
Croatia	823	675			
Mozambique	809	876			
Latvia	800	672			
Tanzania	797	697			
Total	1,399,287	1,341,860	1,275,227	1,151,252	1,038,968

== See also ==
- Visa requirements for Mauritian citizens
- List of diplomatic missions of Mauritius
