= France–Mauritius relations =

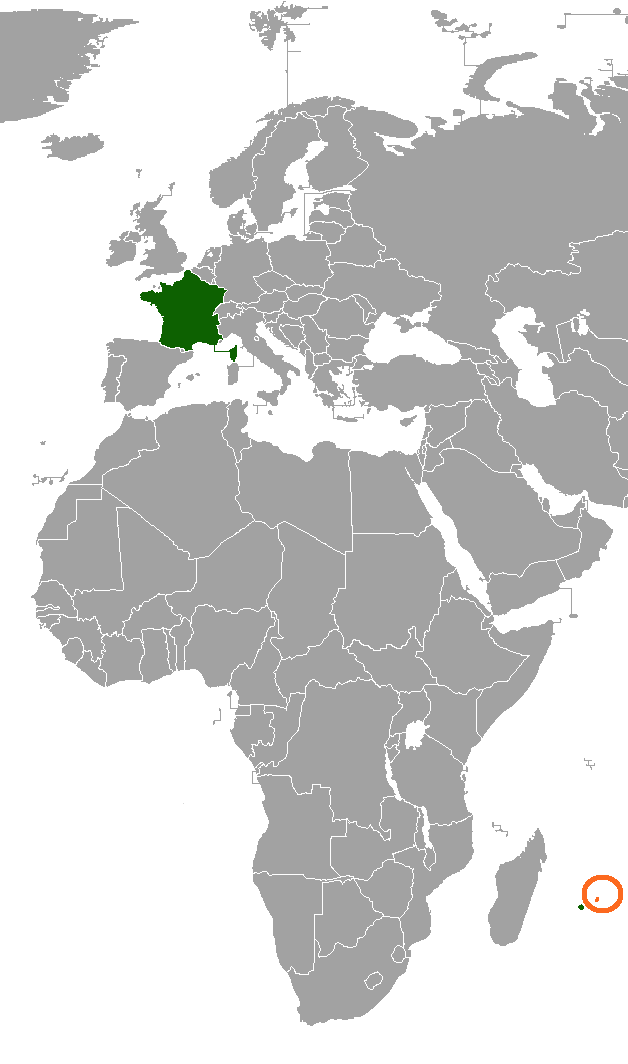
- France: Mauritius

Diplomatic mission
- Embassy of France, Port Louis: Embassy of Mauritius, Paris

France–Mauritius relations (or Franco–Mauritian relations) are the historical, political, economic, social and cultural connections between the Republic of France and the Republic of Mauritius. Mauritius also shares close ties with its nearest neighbour, the French island of Réunion. Connections between France and Mauritius date back to 1710 when Mauritius became a French colony and was renamed Isle de France. The only dispute between the two countries is the sovereignty of Tromelin; the island is claimed by Mauritius. The French embassy is located at Port Louis, while Mauritius has an embassy in Paris.

== Trade ==
The trade relations between Mauritius and France are strong, multi-layered and have grown over the years. France is one Mauritius's strategic partners; it is by far the most important market for the Mauritian tourism industry.

== See also ==
- France–Africa relations
- Franco-Mauritian
- Mauritians in France
- Mauritians
- Foreign relations of France
- Foreign relations of Mauritius
