= Madagascar–Mauritius relations =

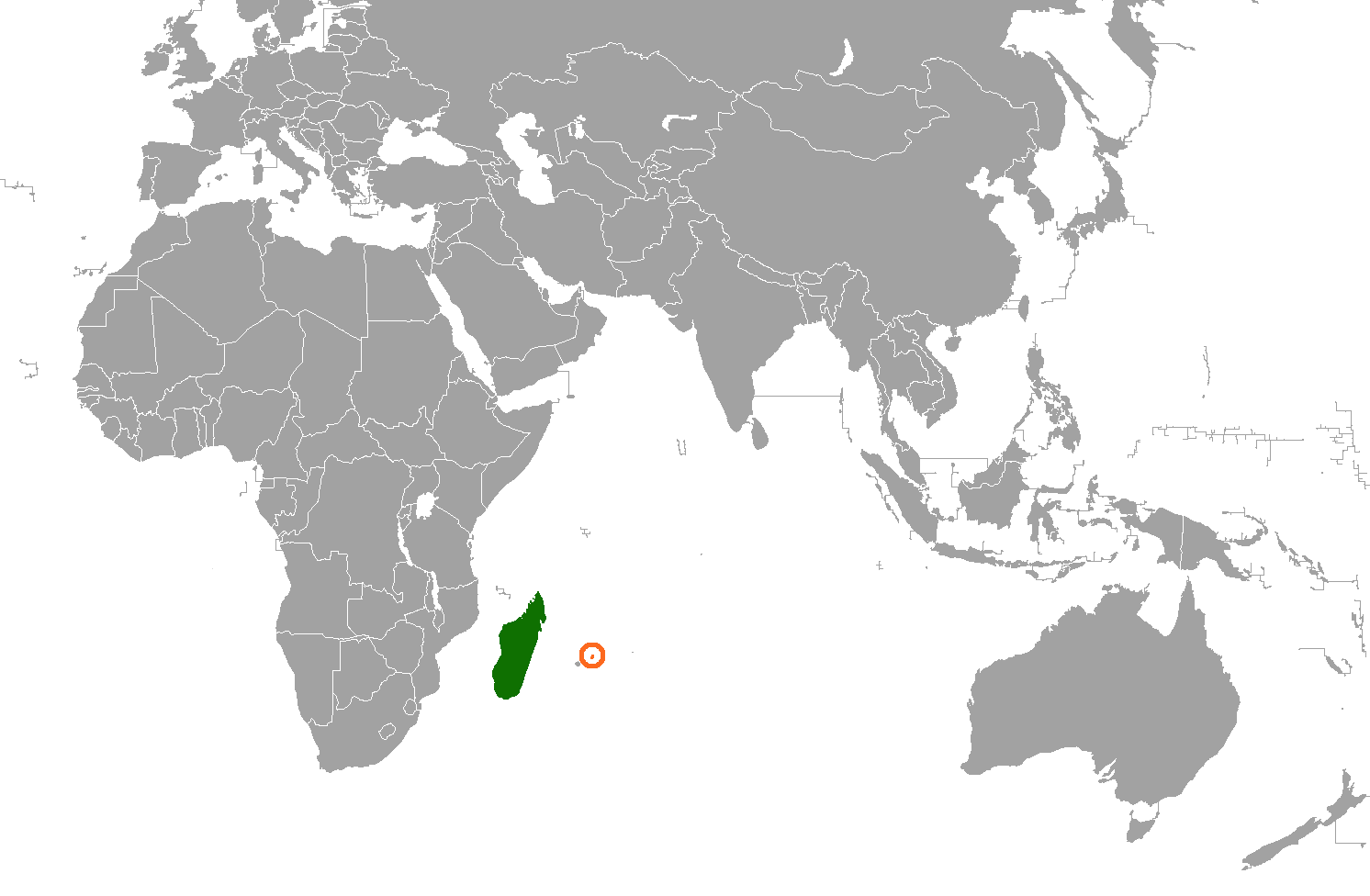
- Madagascar: Mauritius

Madagascar–Mauritius relations are the bilateral relations between Madagascar and Mauritius. Both nations are members of the African Union, Group of 77, Non-Aligned Movement, Indian Ocean Commission and the Southern African Development Community. Madagascar has an embassy in Port Louis and Mauritius has an embassy in Antananarivo.

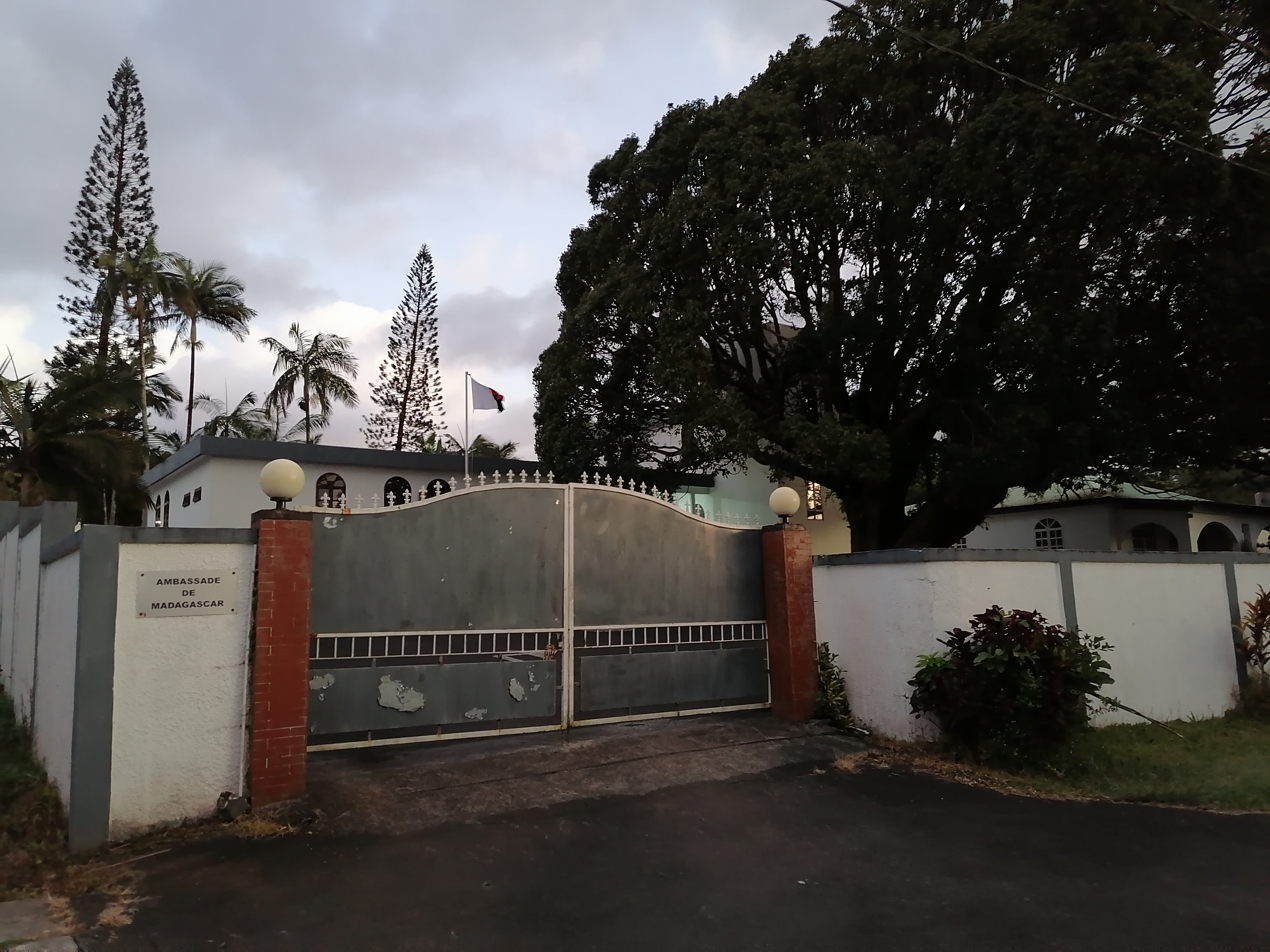
Embassy of Madagascar in Port Louis

== High level visits ==
In 2016, Madagascan President Hery Rajaonarimampianina visited Mauritius.

In March 2019, Mauritian Prime Minister Pravind Jugnauth welcomed Madagascan President Andry Rajoelina.

== Trade ==
Madagascar is the second largest trading partner of Mauritius in Africa. Mauritius' exports to Madagascar amounting to US$135 million and Madagascar's exports to Mauritius reaching US$59 million.

== Agreements ==
In March 2019, three Memoranda of Understanding were signed by the two countries in the fields of tertiary education and scientific research, mutual legal assistance as well as the harmonisation of scientific norms.

== See also ==
- Foreign relations of Madagascar
- Foreign relations of Mauritius
