= List of diplomatic missions in Mauritius =

This is a list of diplomatic missions in Mauritius. At present, the capital city of Port Louis hosts 16 embassies/high commissions and 2 career consulates-general. Several other countries have missions accredited from other capitals, mostly in Pretoria, Harare, Antananarivo and London.

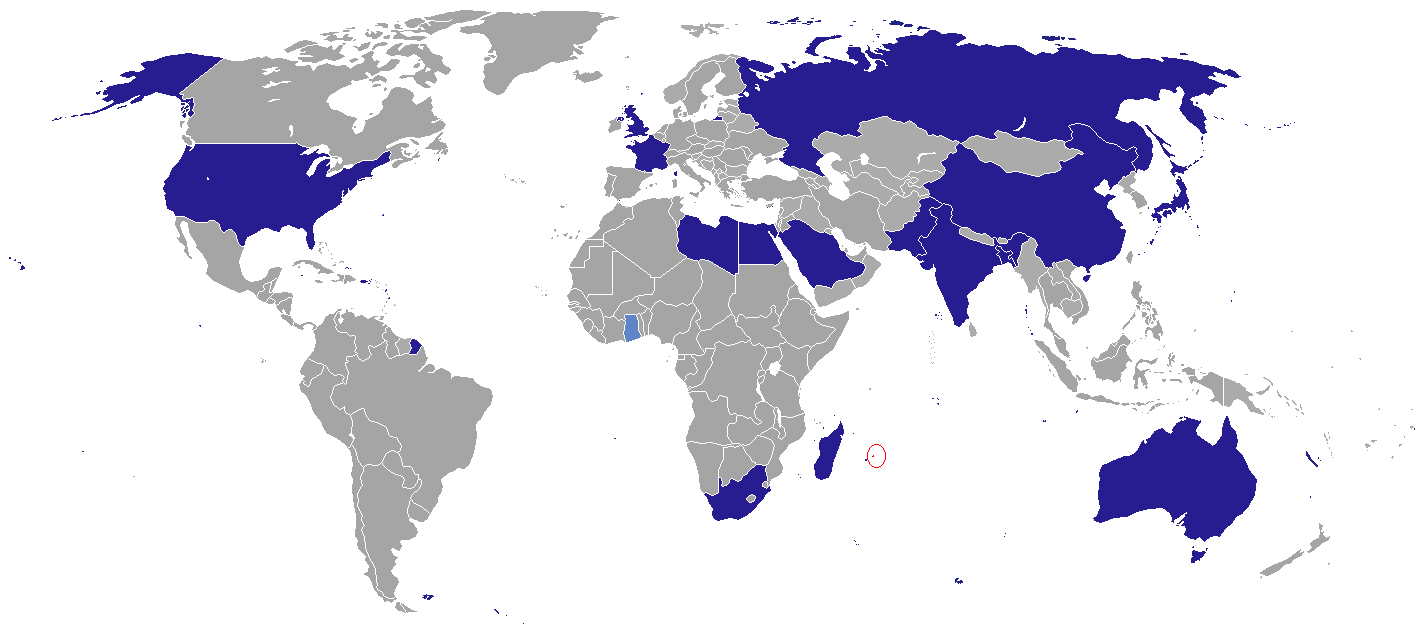
Map of diplomatic missions in Mauritius

== Diplomatic missions in Port Louis ==
=== Embassies/High commissions ===
1. Australia
2. Bangladesh
3. China
4. Egypt
5. France
6. India
7. Japan
8. Libya
9. Madagascar
10. Pakistan
11. Russia
12. Saudi Arabia
13. South Africa
14. Sovereign Military Order of Malta
15. United Kingdom
16. United States

=== Other missions or delegations ===
1. European Union (Delegation)

== Consulates-general in Port Louis ==
1. Comoros
2. Ghana

== Non-resident embassies/high commissions accredited to Mauritius ==
=== Resident in Antananarivo, Madagascar ===
1. Algeria
2. Germany
3. Holy See
4. Indonesia
5. Iran
6. Morocco
7. South Korea
8. Turkey

=== Resident in Dar es Salaam, Tanzania ===
1. Angola
2. Belgium
3. Congo-Kinshasa
4. Kenya
5. Palestine
6. Somalia
7. Uganda

=== Resident in Harare, Zimbabwe ===
1. Cuba
2. Ethiopia
3. Malaysia
4. Sweden
5. Tanzania

=== Resident in Maputo, Mozambique ===
1. Botswana
2. Eswatini
3. Congo-Brazzaville
4. Nigeria
5. Norway
6. Portugal
7. United Arab Emirates
8. Vietnam
9. Zambia

=== Resident in Nairobi, Kenya ===
1. Denmark
2. Greece
3. Iraq
4. Poland

=== Resident in Pretoria, South Africa ===
1. Argentina
2. Austria
3. Brazil
4. Bulgaria
5. Burkina Faso
6. Cameroon
7. Canada
8. Central African Republic
9. Chile
10. Colombia
11. Croatia
12. Cyprus
13. Czechia
14. Dominican Republic
15. Eritrea
16. Finland
17. Gabon
18. Georgia
19. Ghana
20. Guinea
21. Hungary
22. Ireland
23. Israel
24. Italy
25. Ivory Coast
26. Jamaica
27. Kuwait
28. Lesotho
29. Mali
30. Malawi
31. Mauritania
32. Mexico
33. Mozambique
34. Myanmar
35. Namibia
36. Nepal
37. Netherlands
38. New Zealand
39. North Korea
40. Oman
41. Philippines
42. Romania
43. Rwanda
44. Senegal
45. Serbia
46. Seychelles
47. Slovakia
48. Spain
49. Sudan
50. Switzerland
51. Syria
52. Thailand
53. Trinidad and Tobago
54. Tunisia
55. Venezuela
56. Zimbabwe

=== Resident elsewhere ===
1. Comoros (Moroni)
2. Fiji (New Delhi)
3. Iceland (Reykjavík)
4. Maldives (Colombo)
5. Qatar (Mbabane)
6. Singapore (Singapore)
7. Sri Lanka (Victoria)
8. Yemen (Addis Ababa)

=== Unverified ===
- Afghanistan (New Delhi)
- Antigua and Barbuda (London)
- Barbados (London)
- Bahrain (New Delhi)
- Brunei (New Delhi)
- Cambodia (New Delhi)
- Costa Rica (Nairobi)
- Haiti (Pretoria)
- Jordan (Pretoria)
- Kyrgyzstan (New Delhi)
- Laos (New Delhi)
- Lebanon (Pretoria)
- Malta (Valletta)
- Marshall Islands (Suva)
- Micronesia (New York City)
- Nauru (Suva)
- Nicaragua (Managua)
- Sahrawi Republic (Dar Es Salaam)
- Saint Kitts and Nevis (London)
- Saint Lucia (London)
- Saint Vincent and the Grenadines (London)
- Sierra Leone (Nairobi)
- São Tomé and Príncipe (Luanda)
- South Sudan (Pretoria)
- Tajikistan (New Delhi)
- Turkmenistan (New Delhi)
- Togo (Pretoria)
- Uruguay (Pretoria)
- Uzbekistan (New Delhi)
- Vanuatu (Canberra)

== See also ==
- Foreign relations of Mauritius
- List of diplomatic missions of Mauritius
