= China–Mauritius relations =

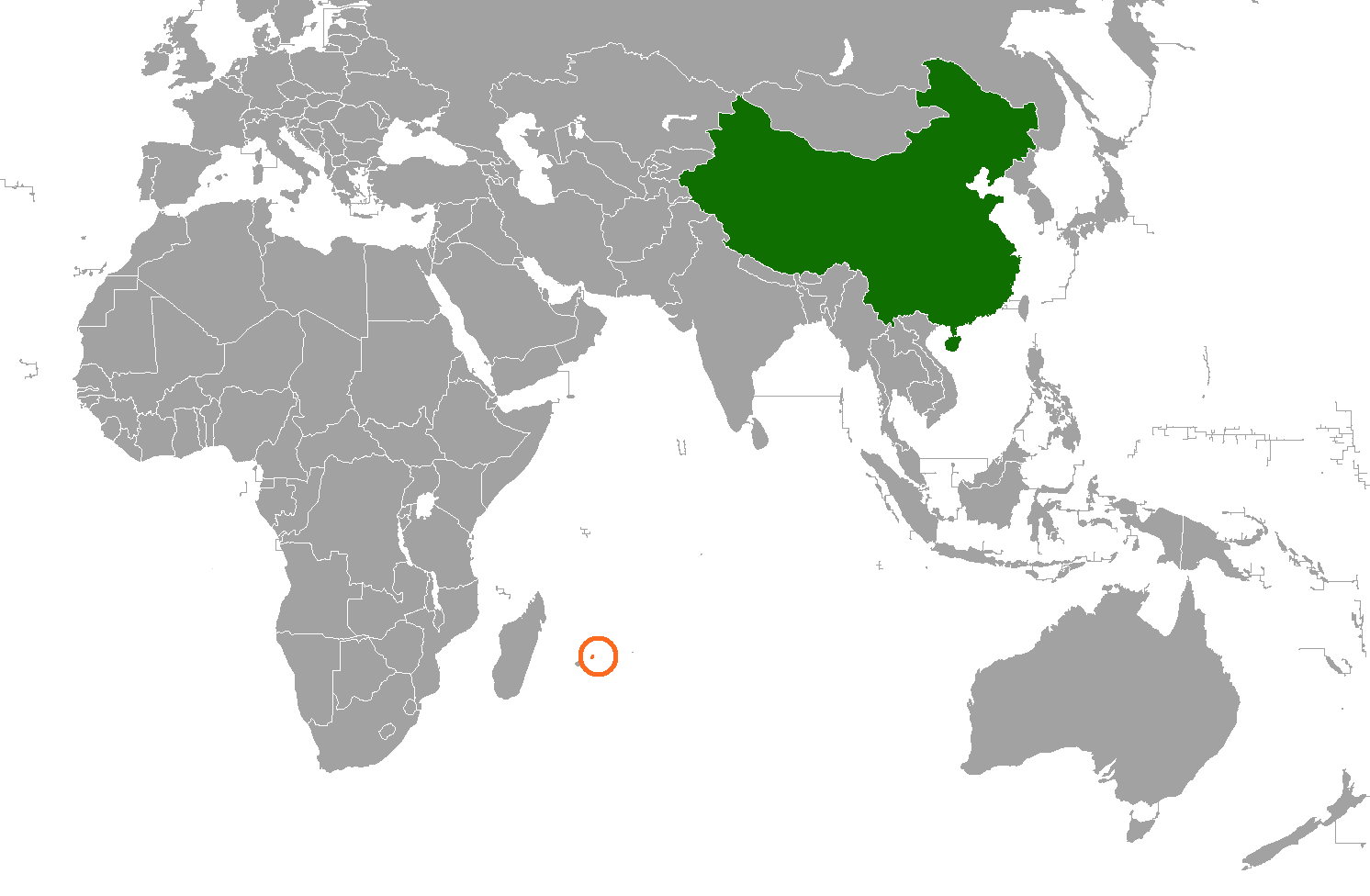
- China: Mauritius

The China–Mauritius relations refers to the bilateral relations between the island nation of the Republic of Mauritius and the People's Republic of China (PRC). A significant portion of the Mauritian population is of Chinese descent, known as Sino-Mauritians, having arrived on the island between the 17th and 19th centuries. Official diplomatic relations between the two countries were established on 15 April 1972 and, since then, relations between the two countries have been strong and have seen steady development. The Chinese President Hu Jintao visited Mauritius on 16 February 2009.

== Economic relations ==
From 2000 to 2012, there are approximately 47 Chinese official development finance projects identified in Mauritius through various media reports. These projects range from funding a terminal at Sir Seewoosagur Ramgoolam international airport through a $260 million concessionary loan from the Export-Import Bank of China, to the renovation and repair of the Plaza Theatre in Rose-Hill through interest-free loans offered by the PRC.

== Political relations ==
Mauritius follows the one China principle. It recognizes the People's Republic of China as the sole government of China and Taiwan as an integral part of China's territory, and supports all efforts by the PRC to "achieve national reunification". It also considers Hong Kong, Xinjiang and Tibet to be China's internal affairs.

== See also ==
- Sino-Mauritian
- Overseas Chinese
- Africa–China relations
- Foreign relations of China
- Foreign relations of Mauritius
