= Mauritius–Pakistan relations =

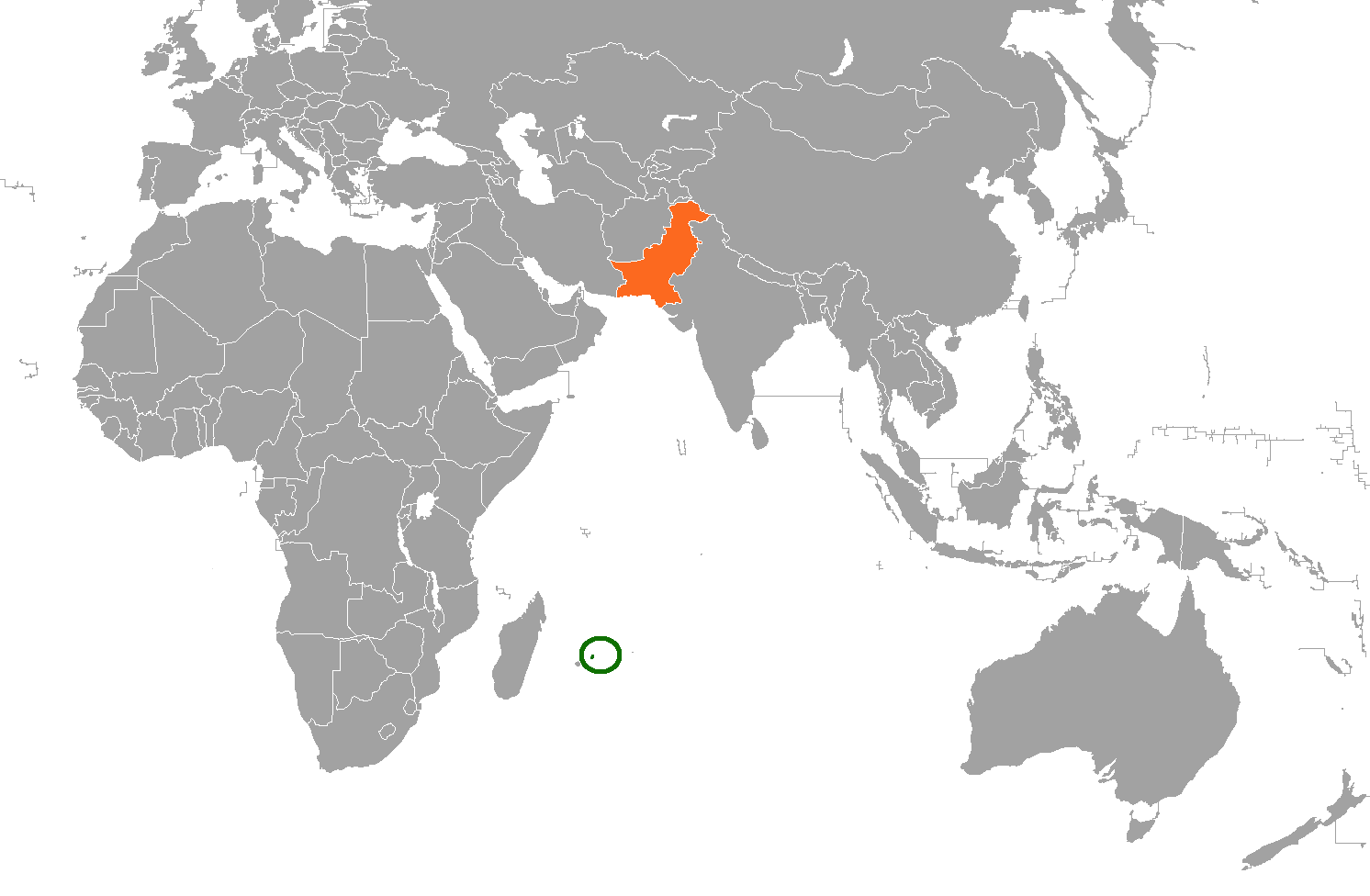
- Mauritius: Pakistan

Mauritius–Pakistan relations refer to bilateral relations between Mauritius and Pakistan. Pakistan has a high commission in Port Louis, whilst Mauritius has a high commission in Islamabad.

== Pakistan Technical Assistance Programme ==
Under the Pakistan Technical Assistance Programme (PTAP), the national Government of Pakistan has been providing assistance to Mauritius in various fields, including medical, dental surgery, pharmacology and engineering.

== Agreements ==
A Preferential Trade Agreement (PTA), negotiated between Mauritius and Pakistan, was signed in July 2007 in Mauritius. Under the PTA, which became operational on 30 November 2007, Pakistan offered concessions to Mauritius on 130 items, whereas Mauritius gave it concession on 102 items. Mauritius and Pakistan have since been planning negotiations for a Free Trade Agreement (FTA).

During September 1994, a Double Taxation Agreement (DTA) treaty between Pakistan and Mauritius was signed. In April 1997, an Investment Promotion and Protection Agreement (IPPA) was reached.
