= Mauritius–South Africa relations =

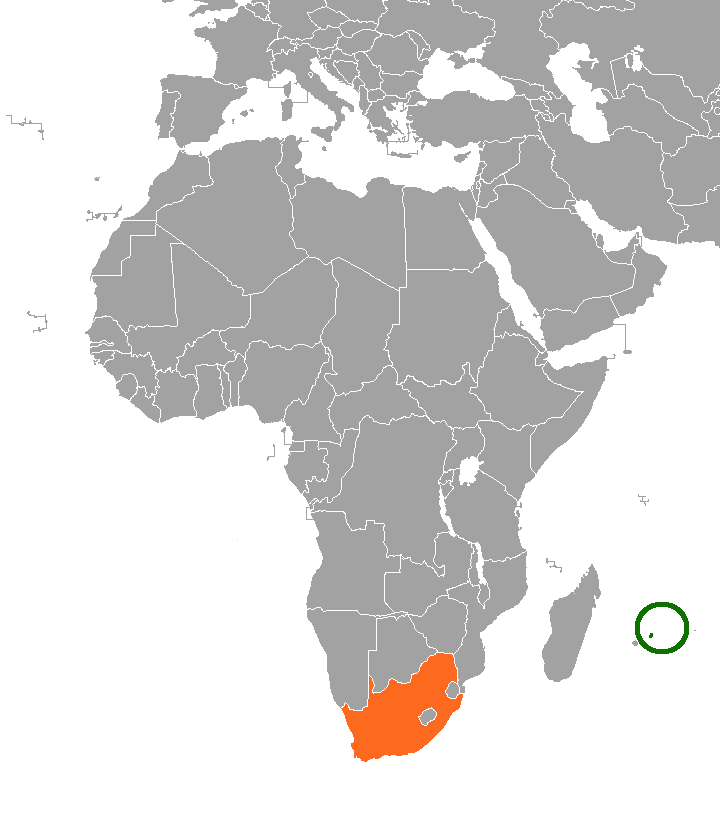
- Mauritius: South Africa

Mauritius–South Africa relations refer to the bilateral relations between Mauritius and South Africa. Both countries are members of the African Union and Southern African Development Community.

As both countries are members of the Commonwealth, the two countries are represented in each other's capital by High Commissions, with Mauritius having one in Pretoria and South Africa having one in Port Louis. Full diplomatic relations were established in 1994.

During apartheid, Mauritius only maintained a trade mission in Johannesburg, the country's commercial capital.

== Trade ==
South Africa is one of Mauritius' largest trading partners.
