= Culture of Mauritius =

Mauritius is a multi-ethnic, multilingual and plural society with a population composed mainly of four major ethnic and religious groups. It is often depicted as a "rainbow nation".

The island of Mauritius did not have any indigenous population and has been characterized by successive waves of European colonization and multiple immigrations. Under French rule between 1715 and 1810, slaves were imported on the island from mainland Africa and Madagascar.

Indian migrants from Pondicherry first arrived on the island in 1736. Later, massive immigration from the Bhojpuri-speaking regions of India took place following the abolition of slavery in 1835 by the British Empire. After an early influx of Chinese migrants into Mauritius, mostly from Fujian, Cantonese and Hakka migrants from Southern China (Guangdong) settled on the island, first as indentured labourers and later as free merchants. Hakka Sino-Mauritians eventually became the dominant group within the community.

The co-existence of Mauritians of Indian, African (known as Mauritian Creoles), European (mostly French), and Chinese ancestry eventually led to a sharing of values and cultures, a collective participation in festivals and an increased understanding between people of different ethnic backgrounds. Mauritians from different cultural backgrounds are very distinct from each other, and it is also highly unpopular to encourage the dissolution of cultural boundaries in Mauritius. Mauritian high culture is French and Indian dominated.

== Religions ==
The Constitution of Mauritius prohibits discrimination based on creed and provides for the right of individuals to change, manifest, and propagate their religious beliefs. The government of Mauritius recognizes 6 groups as religions: Hindus, Roman Catholics, Muslims, Anglicans, Presbyterians, and Seventh-day Adventists; other religious groups must register as associations.

The people of Indian descent (Indo-Mauritian) follow mostly Hinduism and Islam. The Franco-Mauritians, Creoles and Sino-Mauritians follow Christianity. Hinduism is the major religion, followed by Christianity (with Catholicism as the largest Christian denomination), followed by Islam and some form of Chinese-related religions; a very small number of people follow Buddhism.

A majority of Sino-Mauritians identify as Catholic Christians. However, Sino-Mauritians also follow some form of Chinese-related religions (which include Taoist and Chinese Folk religions). A minority of Sino-Mauritians follow Buddhism; they also follow Confucianism. Guan Di (Kwan Tee; the god of wealth, also the god of war and the righteous and the benefactor) is an important deity for Sino-Mauritians, especially for those working in the business field. In Chinese pagodas, altars can also be found for Guan Yin, the Goddess Mazu (also known as Tin Hao; the protector of sailors), the God Choy Sun (the God of Good Fortune). Pagodas also shelter ancestral cult altars and ancestral tablets. Following Chinese tradition, religious services are typically conducted one week after death at the pagoda and the ancestral tablet of the deceased with his name written in Chinese characters is deposited behind the altar. On Chinese New Year, descendants of the deceased can practice the ancestral rites before the ancestral tablets as a sign of respect.

== Public holidays and festivals ==
=== Celebrated festivals with public holidays ===
Public holidays on the same dates

Name of holiday	Description	Date	Type of calendar
New Year's Day	Celebration to welcome the new year, celebrated by Mauritians of all origins. Some Mauritians keep vigils on New Year's Eve and set off fireworks.	1-2 January	Follows Gregorian calendar
Abolition of Slavery Day	Commemoration of the end of slavery in Mauritius in 1835.	1 February	Follows Gregorian calendar
National Day	Celebration of Mauritius' independence from Britain in 1968.	12 March	Follows Gregorian calendar
Labour Day	Observed in solidarity with other workers worldwide	1 May	Follows Gregorian calendar
Arrival of Indian indentured labourers Day	Commemoration of the indenture labourers' contribution to the heritage and development of Mauritius.	2 November	Follows Gregorian calendar
Christmas Day		25 December	Follows Gregorian calendar

Public holidays with different dates

The festivals listed below are not celebrated on the same date every year. Therefore, only the months when they are likely to be celebrated is given.

Name of holiday	Month of the year based on Gregorian calendar	Ethnic/religious groups	Description
Chinese Spring Festival	January or February, dependent on the Chinese calendar	Chinese Festival of Sino-Mauritians and Overseas Chinese living in Mauritius	The Spring Festival, which is the Chinese New Year, is celebrated in January/February, depending on the adjustment of lunar days. Red, the symbol of happiness, is the dominant colour. Food is piled up to ensure abundance during the year and the traditional wax cake is distributed to relatives and friends. Firecrackers are lit to ward off evil spirits.
Thaipoosam Cavadee	January or February, dependent on the Tamil calendar	Hindu festival of Tamil Mauritians	Cavadee is celebrated in honour of Hindu deity Lord Murugan during January/February, more precisely by the Tamil community in Mauritius. Along with the fire-walking and sword-climbing ceremonies, Cavadee is among the most spectacular Tamil events. The body pierced with needles and the tongue and cheeks with skewers, the devotee, trance-like and in penance, walks in procession to the temple bearing the "Cavadee", a wooden arch covered with flowers with a pot of milk at each end of its base which he or she places before the deity.
Maha Shivratree	Between February and March	Hindu Festival of mainly Bihari Mauritians and other Hindu communities as well	Maha Shivaratree is celebrated in honour of Hindu deity Lord Shiva during Falgun month. Hindu devotees, clad in spotless white, carry the "Kanwar" - wooden arches covered with flowers – set foot for the pilgrimage to Ganga Talao, to fetch the Ganga Jal from the lake. The whole scene is reminiscent of the great rituals on the banks of the Holy Ganges in India.
Ugadi/Gudi Padwa	March	Hindu Festival of Telugu community and Marathi community in Mauritius	Ugadi/Gudi Padwa is the Hindu New Year for Telugus and Marathis respectively.
Assumption Day	15 August	Christian Festival	During odd years, and Assumption Day in even years. The decision to alternate between the two dates was a government decision to avoid increasing the number of unworked days after Abolition of Slavery (1 February) and Arrival of Indian indentured labourers (2 November) were declared public holidays in the early 2000s.
Ganesh Chaturthi	Between August and September	Hindu Festival of Marathi community in Mauritius	Ganesh Chaturthi is celebrated by the Marathi-speaking community in Mauritius on the 4th day of the lunar month of the Hindu calendar. It marks the birthday of Lord Ganesha, the Hindu deity of wisdom and remover of all obstacles according to Hindu mythology.
Divali	Between October and November	Hindu Festival	Divali is the most jovial of all Hindu festivals. Celebrated in October/November it marks the victory of righteousness over evil in the Hindu mythology. Traditionally, clay oil lamps were placed in front of every home turning the island into a fairyland of flickering lights; these have now been replaced mostly by decorative electric lights.
All Saints' Day	1 November	Christian Festival	During odd years, and All Saints' Day in even years. The decision to alternate between the two dates was a government decision to avoid increasing the number of unworked days after Abolition of Slavery (1 February) and Arrival of Indian indentured labourers (2 November) were declared public holidays in the early 2000s.
Eid Ul-Fitr**	Any time of year because Islam is based on a lunar calendar	Muslim Festival	The exact date of this festival is subject to confirmation as its celebration depends on the visibility of the moon. Eid-Ul-Fitr** is celebrated to mark the end of Ramadan, the Muslim holy month of fasting. It is a day of thanksgiving and rejoicing for Muslims. Special prayers are offered at mosques during that morning.

=== Major events without public holidays ===
Name of Events	Date/ Month of the year based on Gregorian calendar	Ethnic/Religious Group	Description
Chinese Food and Cultural Festival	End of April or Early May	Chinese event	An annual event which takes place in the Chinatown in Port-Louis; it is organized by the Chinese Chamber of Commerce. A festival which celebrates Chinese culture, include Chinese culinary and dance. Foreign performers from China and locals may also perform on that event. It started in 2005.
Dragon Boat Festival	Between End of May and beginning June, dependent on the Chinese calendar	Chinese Festival Sino-Mauritian and Overseas Chinese living in Mauritius	Dragon Boat Festival is celebrated to commemorate Qu Yuan; tradition include eating zongzi. Dragon Boat Festival has become a major annual event in Mauritius over the years, with Chinese dance events and Dragon Boat race competition. The annual event typically happens in Caudan Waterfront, Port-Louis.
Guan Di Birthday; also known as 'Fete Mines' (lit. "Noodle Festival")	August, exact date depends on the Chinese calendar	Chinese Festival	Fete Mines commemorates the birthday of the God Guan Di; tradition includes religious ceremonies, including offerings to Guand Di, Chinese dance performance, and fireworks to ward off evil spirits, and distribution of noodles to guests. Guan Di is an important deity for Sino-Mauritians, especially for people in the business field. It is an important event in the city of Port-Louis.
Père Laval Pilgrimage	8 September	Christian Festival	The death of Father Jacques Désiré Laval is commemorated on the 9 September. Mauritians, regardless of age throughout the island, leave their houses and start on a long march to the shrine dedicated to Père Laval in St. Croix, Port-Louis .

== Clothing of Mauritius ==
Fashion in Mauritius is also influenced by formality-related rules, personal preference, differences between urban and rural lifestyles, and the diverse origins of the Mauritian population, including ethno-religious identity. Mauritians of all backgrounds wear bright colours, especially Mauritian women. Flip-flops (locally known as 'savat'), which are suitable for the Mauritian climate, are worn by all Mauritians regardless of their cultural background.

Beachwear and tight or revealing clothing is acceptable in many resorts but not considered appropriate in towns and villages. Both Western-style clothing and traditional ethnic clothing are worn in Mauritius.

== Cuisine ==
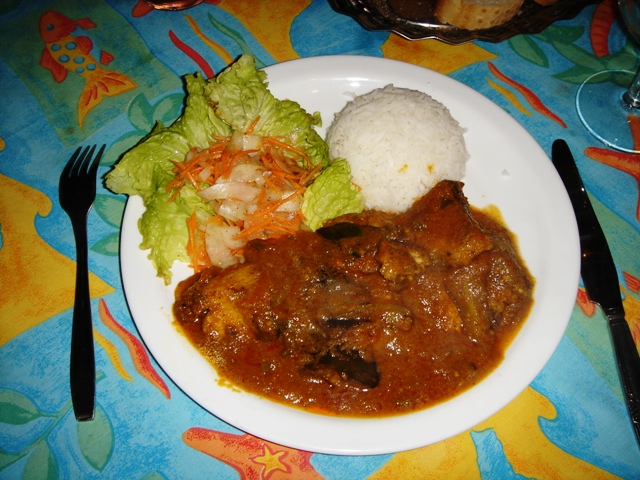
A Mauritian Creole dish of curry with rice and a salad

The cuisine of Mauritius is a blend of African, French and other European cuisines, as well as Chinese, and Indian influences. It is common for a combination of cuisines to form part of the same meal.

Beef and pork are not commonly found in restaurants given dietary restrictions of Hindus and Muslims.

Mauritius has had strong ties with French culture throughout its history and was left with a very French "savoir vivre". Even today, the popularity of French dishes like the bouillon, tuna salad, daube, civet de lièvre or coq au vin served with good wine show the prevalence of French culture in Mauritius. As the years passed by, some have been adapted to the more exotic ingredients of the island to confer some unique flavour.

During the 19th century, after the abolition of slavery, Indian workers who migrated to Mauritius brought their cuisine with them. Those indentured labourers came from different parts of India, each with their own culinary tradition, depending on the region. Traces of both northern and southern Indian cuisine can be found in Mauritius. Some common preparations are curry, chutney, rougaille poisson sale (tomato paste that is very popular with fish) and pickles, most of which use local ingredients. The Mauritian versions of those dishes have a local flavour and differ, at times considerably, from the original Indian recipes.

The end of the 19th century saw the arrival of Chinese migrants, who came mostly from the south-eastern part of China. They are largely credited with making rice, the staple diet of the island, and making noodles, both steamed and fried, popular. Chinese appetizers such as taken (local version of the spring roll with a flour batter replacing the traditional rolled wrapping), crispy chicken and crispy squid have become part of the Mauritian folklore. Furthermore, Chinese and other Asian restaurants are present all around the island, and offer a variety of chicken, squid, mutton and fish dishes, most typically prepared in black bean sauce or oyster sauce. Mauritian families often consider dinner at an Asian restaurant a treat.

Along the years, each of the country's communities has adapted and mixed each other's cuisine to their liking.

The production of rum is common throughout the island. Sugar cane was first introduced on the island when the Dutch colonised it in 1638. Even then, the propensity of making rum out of sugar cane was strongly recognised. Sugar cane was mainly cultivated for the production of "arrack", a precursor to rum. Only much later, after almost 60 years, was the first proper sugar produced.

However, it was during the French and English administration that sugar production was fully exploited, which considerably contributed to the economic development of the island. It was Pierre Charles François Harel who in 1850 initially proposed the concept of a local distillation of rum in Mauritius. In part due to his efforts, Mauritius today houses three distilleries (Grays, Medine and St Aubin) and is in the process of opening an additional three.

While not as famed as its Caribbean counterparts from Cuba, Jamaica or Barbados, Mauritian rum is slowly gaining exposure on the international stage and is considered by local stakeholders as an area of potential growth.

== Language and literature ==
=== Language ===
Currently, the official language of Mauritius is the English language. The British colonial legacy in Mauritius is reflected in the use of the English language in governmental documents and communications; however, English is rarely used in public life and in daily conversation. Mauritians working in the tourism industry are fluent in English, however; English is also taught in school and is the working language of government and businesses.

French is the ancestral language of the Franco-Mauritians. The presence of French settlers left an important mark on the ethnic composition of Mauritius in the form of the Franco-Mauritians; despite being a minority group, the Franco-Mauritians strongly affected the rest of the population through the use of the French language. As the French language was associated with high culture in Mauritius, the educated and the business class commonly spoke French. Nowadays, business and social aspects of life, as well as the media (including daily newspapers), literature and many cultural expressions in Mauritius, are dominated by the French language. Most Mauritians are more comfortable speaking French than English, and French is used by all ethnic groups.

Mauritian Creole evolved from the pidgin used by the French slave masters of the 18th century to communicate with their slaves, and incorporated words from African and Malagasy dialects. Mauritian Creole is understood and spoken by all Mauritians regardless of ethnic background.Mauritian Creole was initially not taught at school due to what was considered 'a lack of prestige' due to its association with the local Creole population and was perceived as a form of 'broken French'. It was only in January 2012 that Mauritian Creole was officially introduced in the National Curriculum Framework and became an optional language subject for primary school students.

Most ethnic groups in Mauritius have an ancestral language. Due to the presence of Mauritians of Indian and Chinese descent, Asian languages, which include Bhojpuri, Hindi, Mandarin, Marathi, Tamil, Telugu, and Urdu, are commonly spoken. Most of these languages act as significant religious and ethnic identity markers. Asian languages are taught at schools, and the ethnic background of a student predominately influences his choice of Asian language.

=== Literature ===
While kreol morisien (Mauritian Creole) is the most-spoken language in Mauritius, most of the literature is written in French, although many authors write in English, Bhojpuri, and Morisien (Mauritian Creole), and others such as Abhimanyu Unnuth and Pahlad Ramsurrun in Hindi. Mauritius's renowned playwright Dev Virahsawmy writes exclusively in Morisyen.

Important authors include Eugénie Poujade, Malcolm de Chazal, Ananda Devi, Raymond Chasle, Loys Masson, Marcel Cabon, Lindsey Collen, and Edouard Maunick. Other younger writers like Shenaz Patel, Amal Sewtohul, Natacha Appanah, Alain Gordon-Gentil and Carl de Souza explore the issues of ethnicity, superstition and politics in their novels.

== Legends and folklore stories ==
Many people in Mauritius, in particular those living in rural areas, believe in witchcraft and paranormal activities; this is very likely to be the combination of African, Malagasy, Indian, Chinese and European folk traditions.

=== Calèche de Lallmatie ===
Calèche de Lallmatie (lit. "Chariot of Lallmatie" in English) is a Mauritian legend around the village of Lallmatie which says that two women dressed in white riding two white horses were seen at night, close to midnight. The legend appeared some years prior to the appearance of Touni Mniwi phenomenon.

=== Lougarou ===
Lougarou (lit. "werewolf" in English; from the French term "Loup garou") is a notorious figure which appears in Mauritian folklore, which is mostly used to scare children; its appearance may result from the combination of French and African folklore stories. The Lougarou appears at full moon and brings trouble to the local population. Protection against the Lougarou is believed to be given if a person consults a longanis (i.e. a local sorcerer) or a treter (i.e. witch doctor).

==== Touni Minwi ====
The legend of Touni Minwi (lit. "Naked at Midnight") appeared in 1994 following Cyclone Hollanda; the cyclone had led to the destruction of many houses and electricity shortages. Touni Minwi was supposedly a form of Lougarou, who would visit women in their homes at night. This led to hysteria among the local population; many witnesses would affirm having seen frightful manifestations at night time, including apparitions of Lougarou. The Touni Minwi phenomenon led to a large mobilization of people in the capital, Port Louis, and in the village of Lallmatie.

=== Mountain-related legends or folk stories ===
==== Le Morne Brabant and the Maroons ====
According to the legend, the maroons decided to jump to their death from Le Morne Brabant when they misunderstood the presence of a group of soldiers who were supposed to inform them that they were emancipated following the Slavery Abolition Act passed by the British. Fearing recapture and being returned to their former masters, they decided to commit suicide.

==== Pieter Both and the Milkman ====
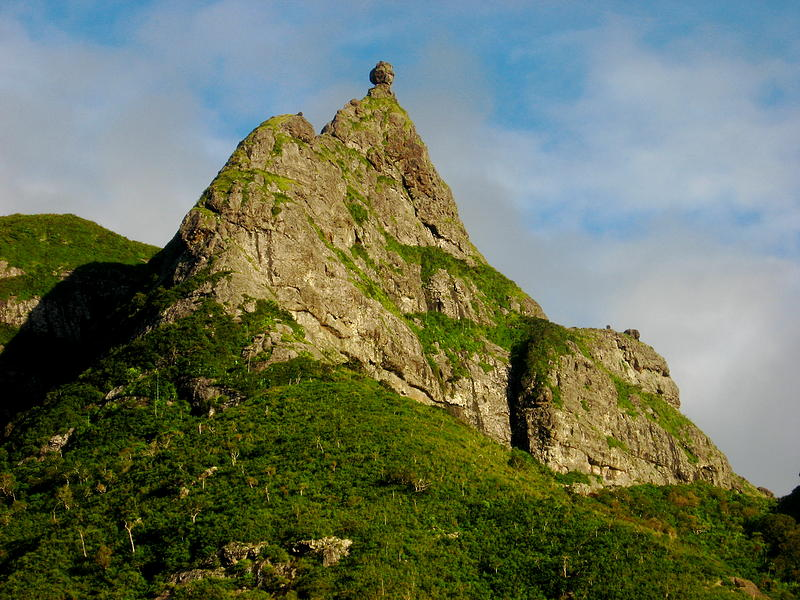
Pieter Both Mountain, Mauritius. The rock at the tip of the mountain is believed to be a milkman turned into stone according to the local legends.

Pieter Both Mountain is one of the most emblematic places in Mauritius; it is characterized by a rock which looks like a human head on its top. According to a famous local legend, a milkman from the village of Crève Coeur (which is also located at the foot of the mountain) used to sell milk in the surrounding villages. One day, the milkman decided to take a shortcut through Pieter Both to reach the next village; when walking, he felt tired and decided to rest. When he woke up, he saw fairies dancing and singing; the fairies told him not to tell anyone about what they saw or he would be turned into stone. The milkman, however, could not prevent himself and told the story to his friends. When the milkman returned to Pieter Both, the fairies knew that he did not keep the secret and turned him into stone. The head of milkman is the top of the mountain. The rock, which is perched on the tip of Pieter Both, is therefore believed to be the milkman.

== Landmarks, architecture, and monuments of significance ==
=== World Heritage Sites ===
==== Aapravasi Ghat ====
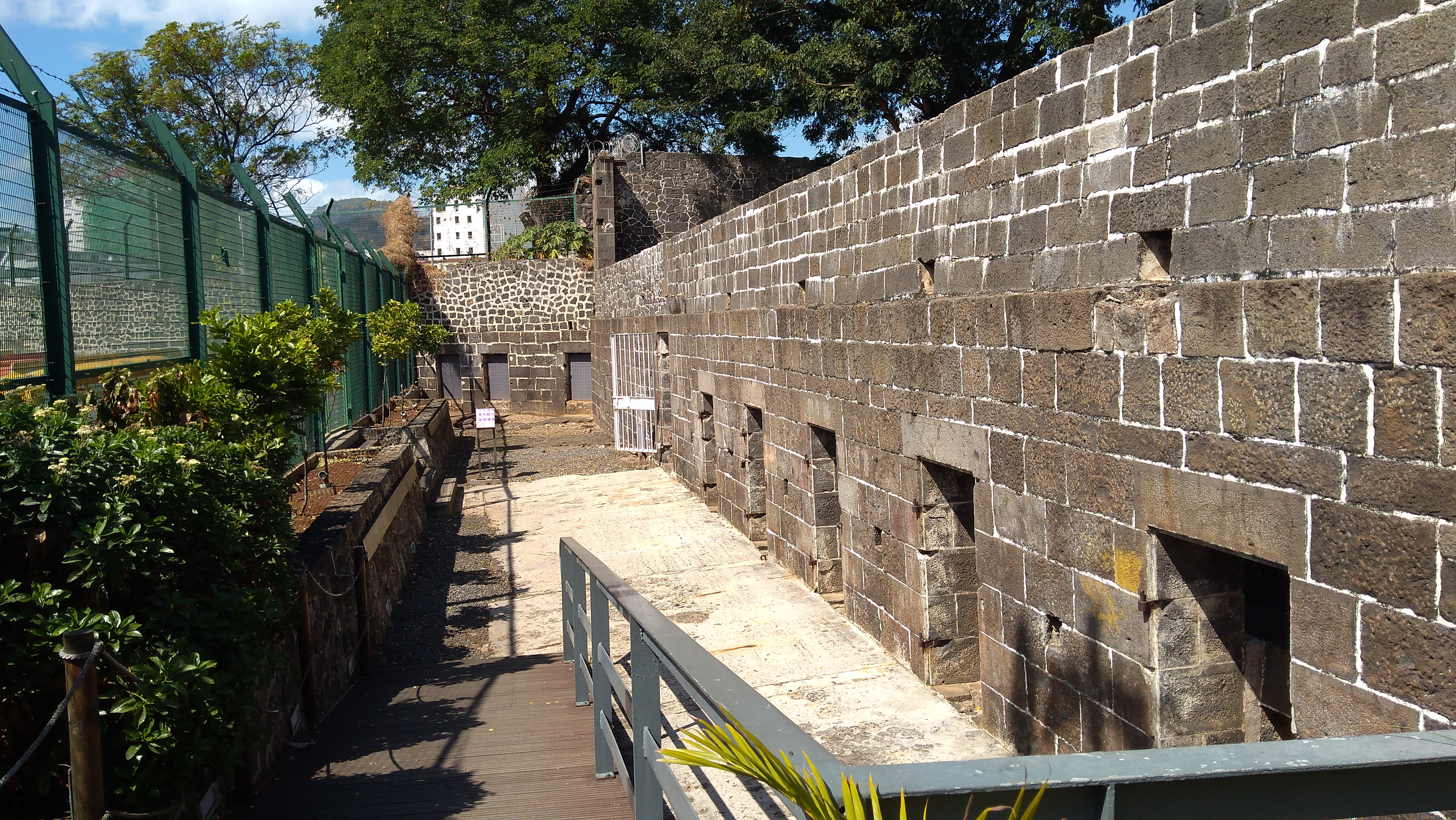
Old monument at Aapravasi Ghat Museum, Port Louis, Mauritius

The Aapravasi Ghat is found in the bay of Trou Fanfaron in Port Louis; it is the place where indentured Indian labour system started. In 1834, following the emancipation of slaves, the British used Mauritius as their first site to experiment the use of contracted 'free (indentured) labour' from the poorest parts of India to replace the use of slaves. The Aapravasi Ghat is the remnants of an immigration depot built in 1849 to receive the influx of indentured labourers coming from India, Eastern Africa, Madagascar, China and Southeast Asia to start a new life of work on the sugar plantations. The Aapravasi Ghat site is owned by the Ministry of Arts and Culture. The property is protected as National Heritage under the National Heritage Fund Act 2003 and the Aapravasi Ghat Trust Fund Act 2001. It was listed in the World Heritage List in 2006.

==== Le Morne Cultural Landscape ====
Le Morne Brabant is found in the southwest of Mauritius; it used to shelter escaped slaves, called maroons, throughout the 18th to 19th centuries. The Mauritian oral traditions associated with the maroons have made Le Morne a symbol of the slaves’ fight for freedom, their suffering, and their sacrifice. It was listed in the World Heritage List in 2008. The International Slave Route Monument, located at the foot of Le Morne Brabant, was established in 2009 due to its association with a historical and legendary place, called the 'Valley of Bones'. According to the legend, the maroons decided to jump to their death from Le Morne Brabant when they misunderstood the presence of a group of soldiers who were supposed to inform them that they were emancipated following the Slavery Abolition Act passed by the British. Fearing to be recaptured and be returned to their former masters, they decided to commit suicide.

=== Chinese cultural landmarks ===
==== Chinatown of Mauritius, Port Louis ====
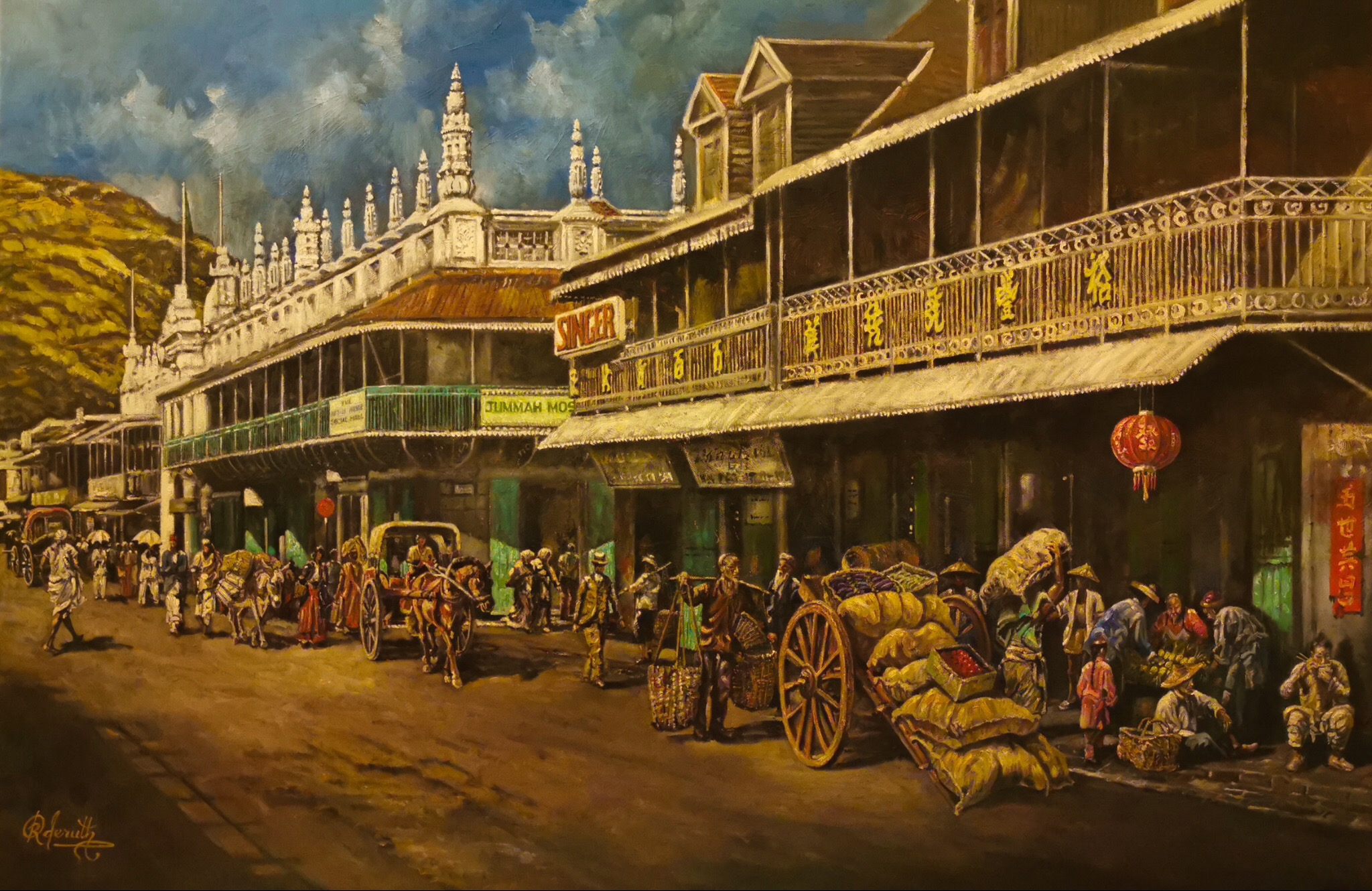
Chinatown of Mauritius, Port Louis, 1960s

The Chinatown of Mauritius is situated in Port Louis. The Chinatown emerged in a city which is marked by the strong racial segregation of the 18th century. A small Chinatown was already forming in Port Louis in the mid-1780s, and in the mid-1840s, Port Louis market was dominated by Chinese traders. The Chinatown was also divided by the Cantonese and the Hakka who showed hostility towards each other. Port Louis Chinatown was originally developed around the shops of Fujianese and Cantonese immigrants in the north of Royal Road and was further expanded in the 20th century. The Cantonese established their own neighbourhood at Royal Road and extended along Arsenal Road to La Rampe Road; they opened shops, restaurants, Kwongs (societies) and religious associations, which include the Chan Cha (founded prior to 1874). Between the 1910s and 1920s, Hakka commerce started to extend beyond the limits of the Old China Town along Royal Road; Hakka business would later expand to the South of Royal Road.In the 1940s, there was an influx of Chinese immigrants who arrived in Mauritius to open more businesses, and decided to settle around Royal Road in the heart of Port Louis, further developing what is currently known as the Mauritian Chinatown.

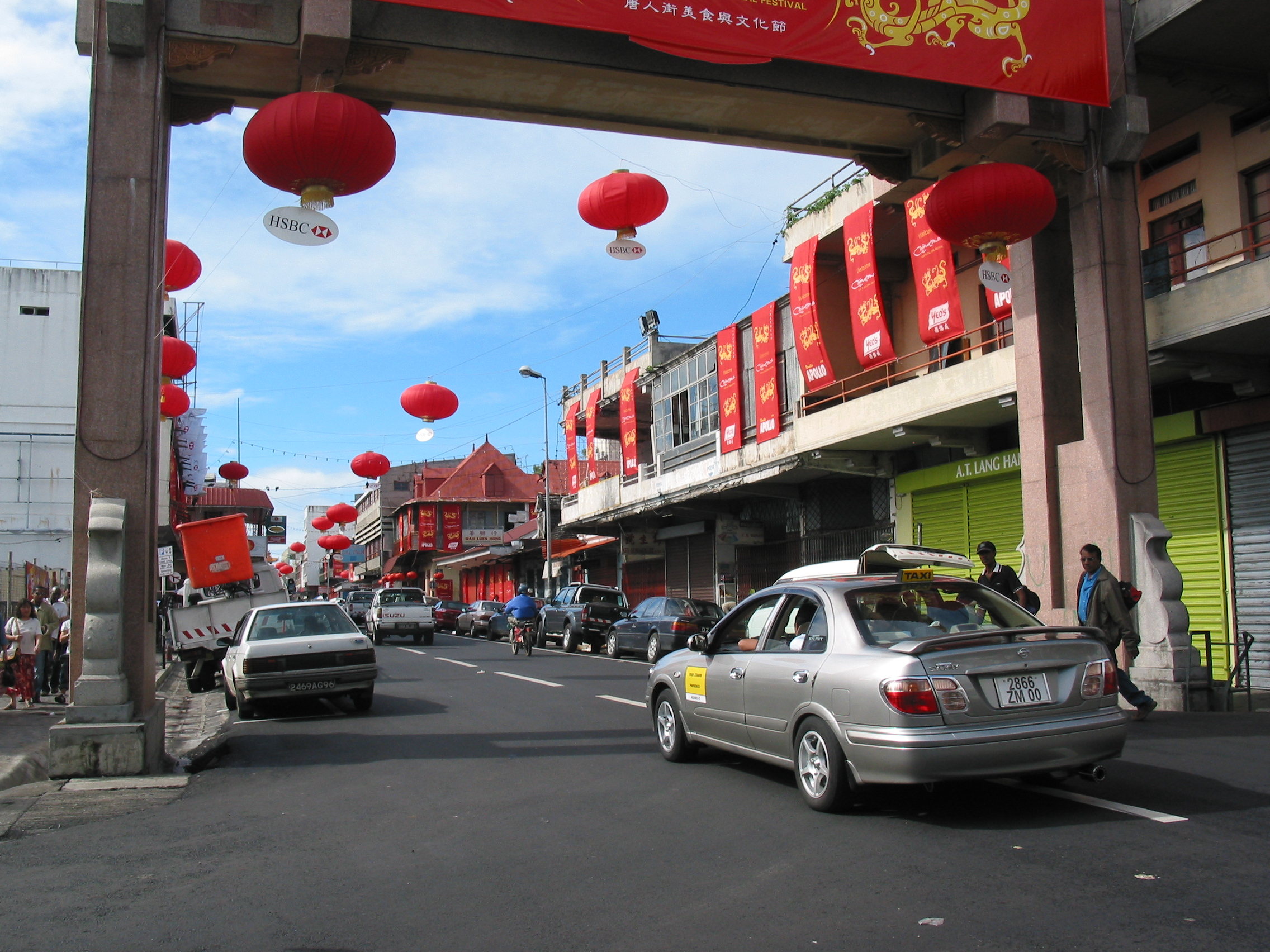
Chinatown of Mauritius, Port Louis, 2007.

The Chinatown also houses the Heritage Court, which is the headquarters of the Namshun Society (also known as the Nam Shun Fooy Kwoon (南顺会馆)). The Namshun Society was initiated by early Cantonese migrants from Nanhai and Shunde (who became known as "Nam Shun" (南顺) in Mauritius) since 1859, when the early migrants formed an informal association of mutual help; it was officially registered on 26 June 1894. The founding father of the Namshun society was Affan Tank Wen.

In 2018, the New Chinatown Foundation was established with the common goal of reviving the Chinatown, as well as restoring and preserving its cultural heritage.

==== Chinese pagodas ====
Chinese pagodas throughout Mauritius are important sites for Sino-Mauritians as these are where traditional ceremonies and festivals take place. It was common practice for Chinese migrants to donate money to the pagodas which they frequently go to.Cantonese clan groupings also set up their own pagodas. Cantonese pagodas included Chan Cha Pagoda (found at Arsenal Road), Tiong Fa Pagoda (found on La Rampe Road), Fok Diak Pagoda (found at Rémy Ollier Road and built in 1846), and Sweet-Hang Pagoda (found on David Road). Nam Shun Fooy Kwoon has pagodas which are located next to the Champs de Mars in Port Louis, consisting of the Kwang Tee (Guan Di) Pagoda (first built in 1895, a new building was inaugurated in November 1980), where a shrine for the dead (jiu sin sun wai) for the Cantonese community is found to allow the souls of the deceased to rest, and the Tin Hao (Mazu) Pagoda; they also have an altar for the God of Good Fortune, Choy Sun.

===== Kwan Tee Pagoda, Port Louis =====
The Kwan Tee Pagoda (or Guan Di Pagoda) is located at Les Salines, Port Louis; it is the oldest pagoda in the Southern Hemisphere and in Mauritius. Its location and construction follow the Chinese principles of spirituality by facing the sea and being against the mountains. It was built in 1842 by Hahime Choisanne and his followers. The Cohan Tai Biou Society (which existed since 1819 and was founded by Log Choisanne) is responsible for the administration of the Kwan Tee Pagoda. Guan Di is an important deity for Sino-Mauritians, especially for people who have businesses. The cult of Guan Di is associated with the god of wealth; Guan Di is also the god of war and of the righteous and of the benefactor. Inside the pagoda, there is the altar of Mazu, who is a protector of sailors, and Guan Yin. There is also an ancestor cult altar, with the oldest tablet dating around 1841. Following Chinese tradition, religious services are typically conducted one week after death at the pagoda and the ancestral tablet of the deceased with his name written in Chinese characters is deposited behind the altar. On Chinese New Year, descendants of the deceased can practice the ancestral rites before the ancestral tablets as a sign of respect. The Kwan Tee Pagoda has also been listed in the National Heritage List since 2016.

== Music and dance ==
Music found in Mauritius has the sounds and rhythms of Western, Eastern, and African civilizations which result from the preserved legacy transmitted by the ancestors of the Mauritians to their descendants. Traditional dances and music were introduced by Indian and Chinese migrants to Mauritius. The most well-known Traditional Chinese dance in Mauritius is the Dragon dance and the Lion dance. Western music and dance are also well represented in Mauritius, where rap, hip-hop, Jazz, and waltz (along with all types of ballroom dancing) can be found. There is also a strong following of oldies music, dating from 1960s and 1970s; performers such as Elvis Presley, Cliff Richard, and Engelbert Humperdinck are part of the national musical heritage.

Some sounds and rhythms from various ethnic backgrounds have also merged to form unique forms of rhythm and sound. The most typical folkloric dance is the Sega, which is of African origin; the Sega was originally danced and sung by slaves before being adopted by all Mauritians. Seggae (a form of music which results from the mixture of the Sega and reggae) emerged in the 1980s, reflecting the mixed cultural aspect of Mauritius.

== National symbols ==
List of national symbols
Symbols	Name	Images	Description
National anthem	"Motherland"		The music was composed by Philippe Gentil, and the lyrics were written by Jean-Georges Prosper. It was first played during the first Independence Day on 12 March 1968.
National bird	Mauritius Kestrel		On 17 December 2021, the Cabinet agreed to declare the Mauritius kestrel (an endemic species unique to Mauritius) the national bird of Mauritius on the occasion of the 30th anniversary of the accession of Mauritius to the status of republic in March 2022.
National emblem and National motto	Coat of arms of Mauritius	Coat of arms of Mauritius	The national motto "Stella Clavisque Maris Indici" literally means the "Star and Key of the Indian Ocean".
National flag	Flag of Mauritius	Flag of Mauritius	The flag of Mauritius is also known as Four Bands and Les Quatre Bandes. It was adopted on 12 March 1968 upon receiving independence. Each colour has a specific symbolism: Red represents the struggle for freedom and independence; Blue represents the Indian Ocean in the middle of which Mauritius is situated; Yellow represents the new light of independence shining over the island; Green represents the agriculture of Mauritius and its colour throughout the year
National flower	Trochetia boutoniana (also known as boucle d'oreille	Trochetia boutoniana flower	It became the national flower on 12 March 1992, when Mauritius achieved the status of a republic. The flower is endemic to Mauritius and is only found in one locality in the wild.

== Sport ==
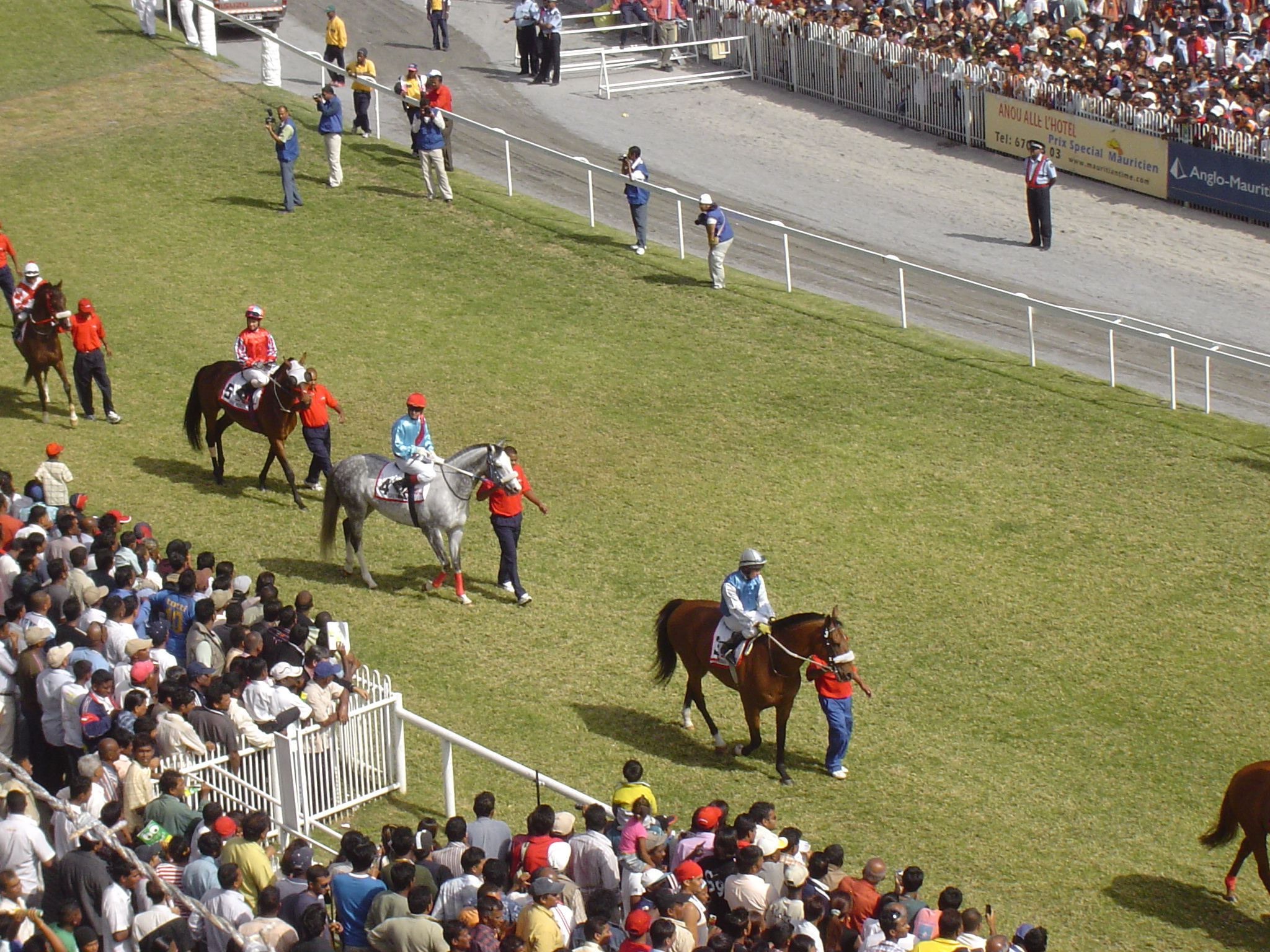
Maiden 2006 Parade. Horse racing is one of the most popular sports on the island.

Due to lack of funding and a local culture that values academic achievement over any other form of activity, Mauritius' national sports teams have been very unsuccessful at a competitive level. However recently, rugby union has rapidly increased in popularity in the small island nation. Football is also popular. Both national teams have very low world rankings for their particular sports.

At the 2008 Summer Olympics, Mauritius had won its first Olympic medal. Bruno Julie, a boxer, won the bronze medal.

However, Mauritius is quite competitive at the regional level (Inter-Ile) in the Indian Ocean. Mauritius has collected some gold, silver and bronze medals at the Jeux des Iles de l'Océan Indien (JIOI). The second and the fifth editions were hosted by Mauritius in 1985 and 2003 respectively. Mauritius also organised the JIOI in 2019, where the Mauritian athletes dominated the games and won numerous gold medals and the competition.

As in countries like Malaysia, football is hugely popular among males, especially England's Premier League. The most followed clubs are Liverpool F.C., Manchester United and Arsenal F.C. Owing to their recent successes, FC Barcelona have gained significant support.

The national sport, however, remains horse racing, which is part and parcel of the island's cultural heritage. Horse racing in Mauritius dates back to 1812, when the Champ de Mars Racecourse was inaugurated, making it the oldest racecourse in the Southern Hemisphere. Races are widely followed, both in terms of attendance at the Champ de Mars and viewership by television audiences. Mauritians of all ages like to discuss races, share tips and place bets.

At an amateur and recreational level, there is a growing culture of participation in sport, with trail running, cycling, mountain biking and water sports becoming increasingly accessible and popular.

Basketball has also been steadily rising in popularity. The national men’s team competes in FIBA Africa pre-qualifiers but has yet to reach the AfroBasket finals or World Cup. Youth development programs have launched nine “basketball schools” nationwide to teach fundamentals and channel talent to elite centres.

== See also ==
- Drugs in Mauritius
- Flag of Mauritius
