= Marcel Cabon =

Mauritian writer (b. 1912 d. 1972)

Marcel Cabon (February 29, 1912 at Curepipe – January 31, 1972) was a writer, journalist, and poet.

== Life ==
Marcel Cabon grew up in the village of Petite Rivière on the west side of the island of Mauritius. At the age of 19, he published his first verses in L'Essor, a national daily newspaper. In 1946, Marcel frequently traveled to Madagascar; a year later, he was no longer welcomed by local journalists, and the authorities deported him to Mauritius. Despite the forced deportation, Cabon's time in Madagascar inspired him to write Kélibé-Kéliba in 1956.

After spending some time working as a radio broadcaster, Cabon returned to print media. In 1956, he became the editor of the Mauritian. He also held the same position at Advance, a pro-labor daily newspaper.

His novel Namasté earned him the literary pseudonym Marcel Cabon. The hero in the novel, Ram, is a young Indo-Mauritian who inherits a piece of land and becomes popular in his village. He encourages the peasants to help each other by building a school and a road, but when his wife is killed by the collapse of his house during a tropical storm, Ram loses his purpose. Namasté was reissued in 1981 and later reprinted to accommodate the educational institutions that have included his novel in their programs.

In 1970, Cabon left the management of Advance to become the Chief of Information Service of the Mauritian Radio-Television, associated with the Mauritius Broadcasting Corporation.

== Works ==
- Gochu, novel (1965). Port Louis: Eds. of the Indian Ocean, 1981.
- Brasse-au-Vent, novel (1968). Port Louis: Eds. of the Indian Ocean, 1989.
