= List of Mauritius-related topics =

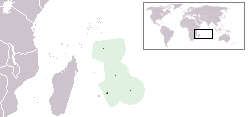
Location of Mauritius

This is a partial list of topics related to Mauritius.

== Geography ==
- Le Morne Brabant
- Trou aux Cerfs

=== Landforms ===
==== Banks ====
- Hawkins Bank
- Nazareth Bank
- Saya de Malha Bank
- Soudan Banks

==== Bays ====
- Baie du Tombeau
- Blue bay

==== Islands ====
- Mauritius Island
- Islets of Mauritius
- Agalega Islands
- Cargados Carajos
- Île Plate
- Île aux Cerfs
- Île de la Passe
- Rodrigues
- Round Island
- Tromelin Island

==== Lakes ====
- Ganga Talao
- Mare aux Vacoas

==== Mountains ====
- Corps de Garde
- Mont Malartic
- Montagne Cocotte
- Pieter Both
- Le Pouce
- Rempart Mountain
- Piton de la Petite Rivière Noire

==== Rivers ====
- Rivière des Créoles
- Rivière du Rempart (river)
- Rivière Tamarin
  - Tamarind Falls
- Rivière du Tombeau

=== Settlements ===
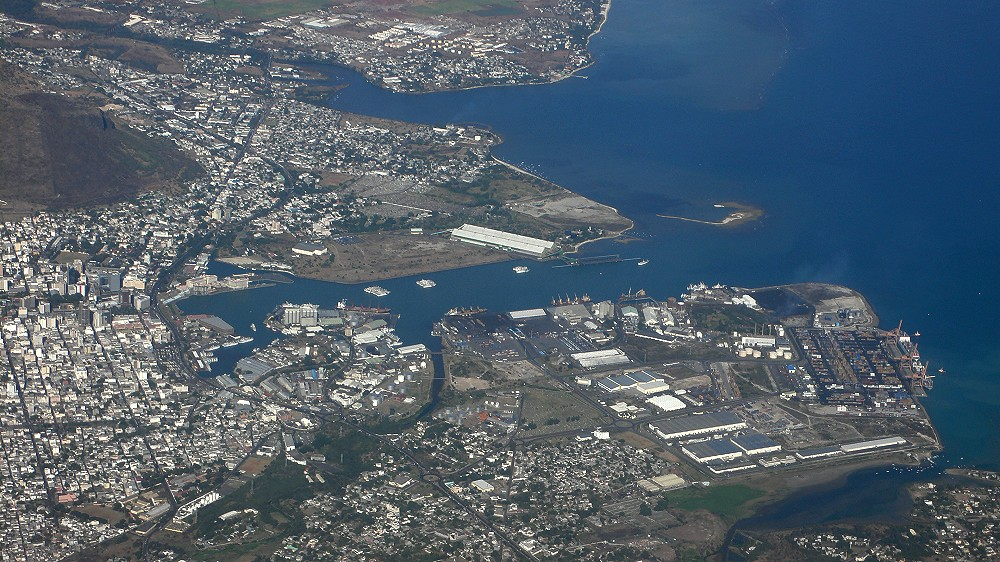
Aerial view of Port Louis

Panoramic view of Port Louis

- Port Louis (capital city)
- Anse aux Anglais
- Baie du Tombeau
- Bambous
- Bel Ombre
- Bénarès
- Cape Malheureux
- Centre de Flacq
- Chamarel
- Curepipe
- Flic en Flac
- Fond du Sac
- Grand Baie
- Grand Gaube
- Grande Rivière Sud Est
- Grande Rivière Noire
- Le Morne
- Mahébourg
- Mapou
- Midlands
- Moka
- Baie aux Huîtres
- Petit Bel Air
- Port Louis
- Port Mathurin
- Providence
- Quartier Militaire
- Quatre Bornes
- Rivière des Créoles
- Rose-Hill
- Rose-Belle
- St. Pierre
- Souillac
- Tamarin
- Triolet
- Trou aux Biches
- Vacoas-Phoenix
- Vingt-Cinq

== History ==
- Aapravasi Ghat
- Elections in Mauritius
  - Mauritian general election, 2000
  - Mauritian general election, 2005
  - Mauritian presidential election, 2008
- Josias Rowley
- South African Airways Flight 295
- United Nations Security Council Resolution 249

=== British Governors ===
- Charles Cavendish Boyle
- John Chancellor (British administrator)
- James Harford

=== Dutch Governors ===
- Roelof Deodati
- Hubert Hugo
- Cornelius Gooyer
- Isaac Johannes Lamotius
- Jacob van der Meersch
- Reinier Por
- Dirk Jansz Smient
- Adriaan van der Stel
- Abraham Momber van de Velde
- George Frederik Wreeden

=== French Governors ===
- Camille Charles Leclerc, Chevalier de Fresne
- Guillaume Dufresne d' Arsel
- Pierre Benoît Dumas
- Bertrand-François Mahé de La Bourdonnais

== Government and politics ==
- Chief Executive of Rodrigues
- Elections in Mauritius
- Law enforcement in Mauritius
- Mauritian passport
- Military of Mauritius
- National Assembly of Mauritius
- Special Mobile Force

=== Incumbents ===
- Dharam Gokhool — President
- Robert Hungley — Vice President
- Navin Ramgoolam — Prime Minister
- Paul Berenger — Deputy Prime Minister
- Shirin Aumeeruddy-Cziffra — Speaker of the National Assembly

=== Administrative divisions ===
==== Districts ====
- Flacq
- Grand Port
- Moka
- Pamplemousses
- Plaines Wilhems
- Port Louis
- Rivière du Rempart
- Rivière Noire
- Savanne

==== Dependencies ====
- Agalega Islands (Vingt-Cinq)
- Cargados Carajos Shoals (Raphael)
- Rodrigues (Port Mathurin)

=== Foreign relations ===
- Diplomatic missions of Mauritius
- List of diplomatic missions in Mauritius
- Mauritius–United States relations

=== Political parties ===
- Alliance Sociale
- Hizbullah (Mauritius)
- Lalit
- Mauritian Labour Party
- Mauritian Militant Movement
- Mauritian Militant Socialist Movement
- Mauritian Party of Xavier-Luc Duval
- Mauritian Social Democrat Party
- Militant Socialist Movement
- Republican Movement (Mauritius)
- Rodrigues Movement
- Rodrigues People's Organisation
- The Greens (Mauritius)

=== Politicians ===
- List of governors-general of Mauritius
  - John Shaw Rennie
  - Leonard Williams (politician)
  - Raman Osman
  - Henry Garrioch
  - Dayendranath Burrenchobay
  - Seewoosagur Ramgoolam
  - Veerasamy Ringadoo
- List of presidents of Mauritius
  - Veerasamy Ringadoo
  - Cassam Uteem
  - Angidi Chettiar (acting)
  - Ariranga Pillay (acting)
  - Karl Offmann
  - Anerood Jugnauth
- List of prime ministers of Mauritius
  - Seewoosagur Ramgoolam
  - Anerood Jugnauth
  - Paul Bérenger
  - Navin Ramgoolam
- Vice President of Mauritius

== Economy ==
- Bank of Mauritius
- Mauritian dollar
- Mineral industry of Mauritius
- Mauritian rupee
- Stock Exchange of Mauritius

=== Companies ===
- Air Mauritius
- Emtel
- Harel Mallac Group
- L'Express (Mauritius)
- Le Mauricien
- Mauritius Broadcasting Corporation
- Mauritius Telecom
- National Transport Corporation
- Rogers Group

==== Banks ====
- AfrAsia Bank
- Barclays Bank Mauritius
- Mauritius Commercial Bank
- State Bank of Mauritius

=== Trade unions ===
- Federation of Civil Service Unions
- Federation of Progressive Unions
- Mauritius Labour Congress
- Mauritius Trade Union Congress
- National Trade Unions Confederation
- Organization of Artisans' Unity

=== Communications ===
- Emtel
- .mu (Internet country code top-level domain)

==== Media ====
- Mauritius Broadcasting Corporation
- List of newspapers in Mauritius
- L'Express (Mauritius)
- Le Mauricien

=== Tourism ===
- Black River Gorges National Park
- Blue Penny Museum
- Curepipe Botanic Gardens
- Sir Seewoosagur Ramgoolam Botanical Garden

=== Transport ===
- Air Mauritius
- National Transport Corporation
- South African Airways Flight 295

==== Airports ====
- Rodrigues Island Airport
- Sir Seewoosagur Ramgoolam International Airport

== Demographics ==
- List of Mauritians
- Women in Mauritius

=== Ethnic groups ===
- Franco-Mauritian
- Indo-Mauritian
- Mauritian Creole people
- Sino-Mauritian
- Tamil diaspora

=== Languages ===
- Arabic language
- Bhojpuri
- Cantonese
- English language
- French language
- Gujarati language
- Hakka Chinese
- Hindi language
- Mandarin Chinese
- Marathi
- Mauritian Creole
- Punjabi language
- Rodriguan Creole
- Tamil language
- Telugu language
- Urdu

=== Religion ===
- Hinduism in Mauritius
  - Ganga Talao
- Islam in Mauritius
  - Jumma Mosque Mauritius
- Roman Catholicism in Mauritius

== Culture ==
- Clothing in Mauritius
- Kala pani
- List of Mauritian films
- Mauritian literature
- Mohamedally
- National Library of Mauritius
- Women in Mauritius

=== Education ===
- Pre-primary education in Mauritius
- Primary education in Mauritius
- Secondary education in Mauritius
- Tertiary education in Mauritius
- Vocational education in Mauritius
- List of secondary schools in Mauritius
- List of tertiary institutions in Mauritius
- Mauritius Examinations Syndicate
- Certificate of Primary Education
- National Assessment at Form III
- School Certificate (Mauritius)
- Higher School Certificate (Mauritius)

==== Schools ====
===== Secondary schools =====
- College du Saint-Esprit
- Dr Regis Chaperon State Secondary School
- Dr. Maurice Cure State College
- Eden College
- Le Bocage International School
- New Educational College
- Rabindranath Tagore Secondary School
- Rodrigues College
- Royal College Curepipe
- Royal College Port Louis
- Saint Mary's College
- Sir Abdool Raman Osman State College
- St Andrew's School
- St. Joseph's College
- Queen Elizabeth College, Mauritius

===== Tertiary institutions =====
- Sir Seewoosagur Ramgoolam Medical College
- Mauritius Institute of Training and Development
- University of Mauritius
- University of Technology, Mauritius

=== Music ===
- Motherland (anthem)
- Santé engagé
- Sega music

==== Musicians and musical groups ====
- Grup Latanier
- Menwar

=== National symbols ===
- Coat of arms of Mauritius
- Flag of Mauritius
- Motherland (anthem)

=== Sport ===
- 1992 African Championships in Athletics
- 2006 African Championships in Athletics
- Champ de Mars Racecourse
- Mauritius at the 2006 Commonwealth Games
- Mauritius national rugby union team

==== Football ====
- Mauritius Football Association
- Mauritius national football team
- Mauritian Cup
- Mauritian League

===== Football clubs =====
- Arsenal Wanderers
- AS de Vacoas-Phoenix
- Curepipe Starlight SC
- Faucon Flacq SC
- Pamplemousses SC
- Petite Rivière Noire SC
- AS Port-Louis 2000

==== Olympics ====
- Mauritius at the 1984 Summer Olympics
- Mauritius at the 1988 Summer Olympics
- Mauritius at the 1992 Summer Olympics
- Mauritius at the 1996 Summer Olympics
- Mauritius at the 2000 Summer Olympics
- Mauritius at the 2004 Summer Olympics
- Mauritius at the 2008 Summer Olympics

===== Olympic medalists =====
- Bruno Julie (bronze medalist)

==== Tennis ====
- Mauritius Davis Cup team
- Mauritius Fed Cup team

==== Venues ====
- Champ de Mars Racecourse
- Stade Anjalay
- Stade Auguste Vollaire
- Stade George V
- Stade Germain Comarmond

== Environment ==
- Black River Gorges National Park
- Gerald Durrell Endemic Wildlife Sanctuary

=== Wildlife ===
- List of birds of Mauritius

== See also ==
- Lists of country-related topics
- List of lists of African country-related topics by country
