= Lists of boys' schools =

Here are lists of single-sex education (schools which only admit boys, or those which only admit boys at certain levels/years/grades), or those which follow the Diamond Schools model (separating students by gender at points), by country.

== Austria ==
Former

- Theresianum (now coeducational)

== Argentina ==
- Colegio del Salvador, Buenos Aires

== Azerbaijan ==
- Agdash Private Turkish High School, Agdash

Former

- Baku Dede Gorgud Private Turkish High School (closed)
- Baku Private Turkish High School (closed)
- Sharur Turkish High School (closed)

== Bangladesh ==
Barisal Division

- Barishal Zilla School, Barishal
- Barguna Zilla School, Barguna

Chittagong Division

- Annada Government High School, Brahmanbaria
- Bandarban Zilla School, Bandarban
- Chittagong Collegiate School, Chittagong
- Comilla Zilla School, Cumilla
- Cumilla Cadet College, Cumilla
- Hazi Mohammad Mohsin Government High School, Chittagong
- Nasirabad Government High School, Chittagong
- Noakhali Zilla School, Noakhali

Dhaka Division

- Faridpur Zilla School, Faridpur
- St. Joseph Higher Secondary School, Dhaka
- Sher-e-Bangla Nagar Government Boys' High School, Dhaka
- Siddheswari Boys' High School, Dhaka

Khulna Division

- Jashore Zilla School, Jashore
- Khulna Zilla School, Khulna
- Kushtia Zilla School, Kushtia
- Manirampur Government High School, Manirampur
- Victoria Jubilee Government High School, Chuadanga

Mymensingh Division

- Jamalpur Zilla School, Jamalpur
- Mymensingh Zilla School, Mymensingh
- Sherpur Government Victoria Academy, Sherpur

Rajshahi Division

- Bogra Zilla School, Bogura
- Natore Government Boys High School, Natore
- Pabna Zilla School, Pabna
- Naogaon Zilla School, Naogaon

Rangpur Division

- Dinajpur Zilla School, Dinajpur
- Gaibandha Government Boys' High School, Gaibandha
- Rangpur Zilla School, Rangpur

== Brazil ==
- Colégio de São Bento, Rio de Janeiro

Former

- St. Ignatius College
- St. Louis College

== Brunei ==
- Ma'had Islam Brunei, Tutong
- Muda Hashim Secondary School, Bukit Bendera
- Rimba Arabic Secondary School, Rimba
- Sultan Omar Ali Saifuddien College, Bandar Seri Begawan

Note: Hassanal Bolkiah Boys' Arabic Secondary School, despite its name, admits both male and female students.

== Cameroon ==
- Sacred Heart College, Bamenda
- St. Joseph's College, Buea

== Canada ==
=== British Columbia ===
Vancouver

- St. George's School
- Vancouver College

=== Manitoba ===
- St. Paul's High School, Winnipeg

=== Ontario ===
- Canada Prep Academy, St Catharines
- St. Andrew's College, Aurora

Toronto

- Brebeuf College School
- Chaminade College School
- Crescent School
- Neil McNeil High School
- Royal St. George's College
- St. Basil-the-Great College School
- St. Michael's Choir School
- St. Michael's College School
- Upper Canada College

Former

- De La Salle College, Toronto (now coeducational)
- Michael Power High School, Toronto, merged into Michael Power/St. Joseph High School
- Robert Land Academy, West Lincoln (1978–2025)

=== Quebec ===
- Selwyn House School, Westmount

Former

- Collège Jean-de-Brébeuf, Montreal (now coeducational)

== Chile ==
- Colegio del Verbo Divino, Las Condes
- Instituto Regional Federico Errázuriz, Santa Cruz
- Instituto Nacional General José Miguel Carrera, Santiago

== Cyprus ==
Former

- American Academy of Larnaca (now coeducational)

== Egypt ==
- Collège de la Sainte Famille, Cairo
- Collége Saint Marc, Alexandria
- Kafr El-Zayat Secondary School For Boys, Kafr Az-Zayyat

== Ethiopia ==
- St Joseph's School, Addis Ababa

== Fiji ==
- Marist Brothers High School, Suva

Former

- Toorak Boys' School

== France ==
- Chavagnes International College, Chavagnes-en-Paillers

== Ghana ==
Ashanti Region

- Kumasi High School, Kumasi
- Opoku Ware School, Santasi
- Osei Tutu Senior High School, Akropong
- Prempeh College, Kumasi

Central Region

- Adisadel College, Cape Coast
- Mfantsipim School, Cape Coast
- St. Augustine's College, Cape Coast

Eastern Region

- Pope John Senior High School and Minor Seminary, Effiduase
- St. Peter's Boys Senior High School, Nkwatia Kwahu

Greater Accra Region

- Accra Academy, Kaneshie
- Presbyterian Boys' Senior High School, Legon
- St. Thomas Aquinas Senior High School, Osu
- Salem School, Osu

Oti Region

- St. Mary's Seminary/Senior High School, Lolobi

Upper West Region

- Nandom Senior High School, Nandom
- St. Francis Xavier Minor Seminary, Wa

Volta Region

- Bishop Herman College, Kpando
- St. Paul's Senior High School, Hatsukope-Denu

Western Region

- Ghana Secondary Technical School, Takoradi
- St. John's School, Sekondi

== Gibraltar ==
- Bayside Comprehensive School

== Greece ==
- Fifth Boys Gymnasium of Thessaloniki (closed)

A non-profit public secondary school in the city of Thessaloniki's Analipsi neighborhood, comprised 3-year junior high school and 3-year high school (six-grade), and also Higher Education entrance education. Previous was the Villa Mehmet Kapandji, today is The Cultural Centre of Education Foundation of National Bank of Greece.

== Guam ==
- Father Dueñas Memorial School

== Guernsey ==
- Elizabeth College, Guernsey

== Haiti ==
- Collège Notre-Dame du Perpétuel Secours, Cap-Haïtien

== Hungary ==
- Benedictine High School of Pannonhalma, Pannonhalma
- Pelbart Temesvari Franciscan High School, Esztergom
- Piarist High School of Budapest, Budapest

== India ==
Please see, Category:Boys' schools in India.

== Indonesia ==
- Canisius College, Menteng

== Iran ==
Since the Iranian Revolution government schools have been divided by gender

- Tehran International School has separate campuses for boys.

== Iraq ==
- Baghdad College, Baghdad

Al Mutamayizeen Secondary has boys' schools.

== Jamaica ==
- Alpha Boys School, Kingston
- Cornwall College, Montego Bay
- Jamaica College, Kingston
- Munro College, St Elizabeth
- St. George's College, Kingston

Former

- Collegiate School

== Jersey ==
- De La Salle College, Jersey
- Victoria College, Jersey

== Kenya ==
- Alliance High School (Kenya), Kikuyu
- Agoro Sare High School, Oyugis
- Friends School Kamusinga, Kimilili
- Highway Secondary School, South B
- Kapsabet High School, Kapsabet
- Kericho High School, Kericho
- Kiambu High School
- Kisii School, Kisii
- Kitui School, Kitui
- Machakos School, Machakos
- Maliera Boys Secondary School, Kodiaga
- Maranda High School, Bondo
- Mumbuni High School, Machakos
- Murang'a High School, Murang'a
- Nakuru Boys High School, Nakuru
- Nyang'ori High School, Kisumu
- Nyeri High School, Nyeri
- St. Joseph's Rapogi Secondary School, Sare
- St. Luke's Boys' High School, Kimilili
- St. Mary's School, Nairobi
- St. Mary's School, Yala Township
- St. Patrick's High School, Iten
- Sawagongo High School, Gem Constituency
- Starehe Boys' Centre and School, Nairobi

Former

- Baraka School
- Mosocho Academy

== Lebanon ==
Became coeducational

- American Boys College (now International College, Beirut)

== Luxembourg ==
Former

- Lycée de Garçons de Luxembourg
- Lycée de Garçons Esch-sur-Alzette

== Malaysia ==
- Alam Shah Science Secondary School, Bandar Tun Razak
- Batu Pahat High School, Batu Pahat
- Bukit Bintang Boys' Secondary School, Petaling Jaya
- Chung Ling High School, Air Itam
- English College Johore Bahru, Johor Bahru
- Henry Gurney School, Keningau
- Henry Gurney School Puncak Borneo, Kuching
- Kolej Sultan Abdul Hamid, Alor Setar
- Malay College Kuala Kangsar, Kuala Kangsar
- Royal Military College, Sungai Besi
- Sacred Heart National Secondary School, Sibu
- Sultan Alam Shah School, Putrajaya

George Town

- Methodist Boys' School
- Penang Free School

Ipoh

- Sekolah Menengah Kebangsaan Anderson
- Sekolah Tuanku Abdul Rahman

Klang

- Anglo Chinese School
- La Salle School

Kuala Lumpur

- Maxwell School
- Methodist Boys' School
- St. John's Institution
- Tinggi Setapak National Secondary School
- Victoria Institution

Malacca City

- Catholic High School
- Malacca High School
- St. Francis' Institution

Seremban

- St. Paul's Institution
- Sekolah Dato' Abdul Razak
- SMS Tuanku Munawir

Taiping

- King Edward VII School
- St. George's Institution

Former

- St. Michael's Institution

== Malta ==
- St. Edward's College, Cottonera
- St. Michael School, Santa Venera

== Mauritius ==
- Adolphe de Plevitz SSS, Grand-Baie
- Cosmopolitan College (Boys), Plaines Des Papayes
- Dr. Regis Chaperon State Secondary School, Quatre Bornes
- Dr James Burty David SSS, Port Louis
- Ebène State Secondary School (Boys)
- Eden College, Quatre Bornes
- Patten College, Quatre Bornes
- Piton State College, Piton
- Windsor College Boys, Rose Belle

Former

- Royal College Curepipe
- Royal College Port Louis
- Sir Abdool Raman Osman State College

== Mexico ==
- Bachillerato Anáhuac Campus Monterrey

Irish Institute in the State of Mexico has a separate campus for boys.

Universidad Panamericana Preparatoria in Mexico City has a separate campus for boys.

== Namibia ==
Former boys schools

- St. Paul's College, Namibia, (now coeducational)

== Nepal ==
Former boys schools

- St. Xavier's School, Godavari (became coeducational in 1996)

== New Zealand ==
Auckland Region

- Auckland Grammar School, Epsom, Auckland
- De La Salle College, Māngere East, Auckland
- Dilworth School, Epsom, Auckland
- Kelston Boys' High School, Kelston, Auckland
- King's College, Ōtāhuhu, Auckland (Junior only)
- King's School, Remuera, Auckland
- Liston College, Henderson, Auckland
- Rosmini College, Takapuna, Auckland
- Sacred Heart College, Glendowie, Auckland
- Saint Kentigern College, Pakuranga, Auckland - has gender separation in some classes
- St Paul's College, Ponsonby, Auckland
- St Peter's College, Grafton, Auckland
- Tipene St Stephens School, Bombay Hills, Auckland (opening 2025)
- Westlake Boys High School, Forrest Hill, Auckland

Bay of Plenty Region

- Rotorua Boys' High School, Rotorua
- Tauranga Boys' College, Tauranga

Canterbury Region

- Christchurch Boys' High School, Riccarton, Christchurch
- Christ's College, Christchurch
- Medbury School, Fendalton, Christchurch
- St Bede's College, Papanui, Christchurch
- St Thomas of Canterbury College, Sockburn, Christchurch
- Shirley Boys' High School, Christchurch
- Timaru Boys' High School, Timaru

Gisborne District

- Gisborne Boys' High School, Gisborne

Hawke's Bay Region

- Hastings Boys' High School, Hastings
- Lindisfarne College, Hastings
- Napier Boys' High School, Napier
- St John's College, Hastings
- Te Aute College, Pukehou
- Te Aratika Academy, Hastings

Manawatū-Whanganui

- Hato Paora College, Cheltenham, Feilding
- Palmerston North Boys' High School, Palmerston North

Marlborough Region

- Marlborough Boys' College, Blenheim

Nelson City

- Nelson College, Nelson

Northland Region

- Whangārei Boys' High School, Whangārei

Otago Region

- John McGlashan College, Maori Hill, Dunedin
- King's High School, St Kilda, Dunedin
- Otago Boys' High School, Dunedin
- Waitaki Boys' High School, Oamaru

Southland Region

- Southland Boys' High School, Invercargill

Taranaki Region

- Francis Douglas Memorial College, Westown, New Plymouth
- New Plymouth Boys' High School, New Plymouth

Waikato region

- Hamilton Boys' High School, Hamilton
- St John's College, Hamilton
- St Paul's Collegiate School, Hamilton (Junior only)

Wellington Region

- Hutt International Boys' School, Trentham, Upper Hutt
- Rathkeale College, Masterton
- Rongotai College, Rongotai, Wellington
- St Bernard's College, Lower Hutt
- St Patrick's College, Silverstream, Upper Hutt
- St Patrick's College, Kilbirnie, Wellington
- Wellesley College, Days Bay, Lower Hutt
- Wellington College, Mount Victoria, Wellington

Former boys' schools

- Hereworth School, Havelock North, Hawke's Bay
- Waihi School, Winchester, Canterbury
- Scots College, Strathmore Park, Wellington
- St Andrew's College, Christchurch

== Nigeria ==
Abia State

- Government College Umuahia, Umuahia
- Marist Brothers' Juniorate, Uturu
- Ngwa High School, Aba

Akwa Ibom State

- Holy Family College, Abak
- Methodist Boys' High School, Oron

Anambra State

- Bishop Crowther Seminary, Awka
- Christ the King College, Onitsha

Benue State

- St. Andrew's Secondary School, Adikpo

Delta State

- Government College Ughelli, Ughelli

Ebonyi State

- Government Secondary School, Afikpo

Imo State

- Government Secondary School, Owerri

Lagos State

- Eko Boys' High School, Lagos
- King's College, Lagos
- Methodist Boys' High School, Victoria Island
- St Gregory's College, Ikoyi

Ogun State

- Baptist Boys' High School, Abeokuta
- Ijebu Ode Grammar School, Ijebu Ode
- Nigerian Navy Secondary School, Abeokuta

Oyo State

- Government College Ibadan, Ibadan
- Loyola College, Ibadan

Plateau State

- Air Force Military School, Jos

== Pakistan ==
Government schools in this country are divided by gender

- Army Burn Hall College boys' campuses
- Islamabad College for Boys
- PAF College Lower Topa
- Sacred Heart High School for Boys

== Philippines ==
- Aquinas School, San Juan
- Don Bosco Academy, Bacolor
- Don Bosco Technical Institute – Tarlac, Tarlac City
- Don Bosco Technical Institute of Makati, Makati
- Don Bosco Technical Institute of Victorias, Victorias City
- Immaculate Conception School for Boys, Malolos
- Lourdes School of Mandaluyong, Mandaluyong
- PAREF Northfield School, Antipolo
- PAREF Southridge School, Muntinlupa
- PAREF Springdale School, Cebu
- PAREF Westbridge School, Iloilo
- The Sisters of Mary School Adlas Campus, Barangay
- The Sisters of Mary School Minglanilla Campus, Minglanilla
- Xavier School, San Juan

== Portugal ==
- Colégio Planalto, Lisbon

== Russia ==
- Republic Bashkir Boarding School, Ufa

== Saudi Arabia ==
Government schools in this country are divided by gender

- Al-Thager Model School

== Sierra Leone ==
- Bo School, Bo
- Methodist Boys' High School, Freetown
- St. Edward's Secondary School, Freetown

== Singapore ==
- Anglo-Chinese School (Barker Road), Newton
- Anglo-Chinese School (Independent), Dover (Years 1–4)
- Catholic High School, Bishan
- Hwa Chong Institution, Bukit Timah (Secondary)
- Maris Stella High School, Bartley
- Montfort Secondary School, Hougang
- Raffles Institution
- St Andrew's School, Potong Pasir
- St. Gabriel's Secondary School, Serangoon
- St. Joseph's Institution
- St. Patrick's School
- Victoria School, Siglap

== South Africa ==
Eastern Cape

- Dale College, Qonce
- Graeme College, Makhanda
- Grey High School, Gqeberha
- Muir College, Kariega
- Queen's College Boys' High School, Komani
- St Andrews College, Makhanda
- Selborne College, East London

Free State

- Grey College, Bloemfontein
- St. Andrew's School, Bloemfontein

Gauteng

- Afrikaanse Hoër Seunskool, Pretoria
- Athlone Boys High School, Johannesburg
- Christian Brothers' College, Boksburg
- Highlands North Boys High School, Johannesburg
- Jeppe High School for Boys, Kensington
- King Edward VII School, Houghton Estate
- Parktown Boys' High School, Parktown
- Pretoria Boys High School, Brooklyn
- The Ridge School, Westcliff
- St Alban's College, Lynnwood Glen
- St Benedict's College, Bedfordview
- St David's Marist, Inanda
- St Declan's School for Boys, Alberton
- St Stithians College, Sandton (separate boys' and girls' divisions)
- Springs Boys' High School, Springs

KwaZulu-Natal

- Clifton School, Durban
- Drakensberg Boys' Choir School, Drakensberg
- Durban High School, Musgrave
- Glenwood High School, Glenwood
- Hilton College, Hilton
- Kearsney College, Botha's Hill
- Maritzburg College, Pietermaritzburg
- Michaelhouse, Balgowan
- Northwood School, Durban
- Pinetown Boys' High School, Pinetown
- St Charles College, Pietermaritzburg
- Westville Boys High School, Westville

Northern Cape

- Kimberley Boys' High School, Kimberley

North West

- Potchefstroom High School for Boys, Potchefstroom

Western Cape

- Diocesan College, Rondebosch
- Hoër Landbouskool Boland, Paarl
- Paarl Boys' High School, Paarl
- Paul Roos Gymnasium, Stellenbosch
- Rondebosch Boys High School, Rondebosch
- South African College Schools, Newlands
- Star College Bridgetown, Bridgetown
- Wynberg Boys' High School, Wynberg

== South Korea ==
- Bupyeong High School, Bupyeong District
- Chungam High School, Eunpyeong District
- Chungju High School, Chungju
- Daeil High School, Deungchon-dong
- Daein High School, Seo District, Incheon
- Gwangju Jeil High School, Gwangju
- Hankwang Boys' High School, Pyeongtaek
- Hanseong High School, Seodaemun District
- Hongik University High School, Seongbuk District
- Joongdong High School, Gangnam District
- Jungdong High School, Daegu
- Jungsan High School, Gangnam District
- Kangbuk High School, Daegu
- Kwangwoon Electronics Technical High School, Nowon District
- Kyungbock High School, Jongno District
- Kyunggi High School, Gangnam District
- Seoul High School, Seocho District
- Whimoon High School, Gangnam District
- Yongsan High School, Yongsan

== Sri Lanka ==
- Ananda Sastralaya, Kotte
- Bandaranayake College, Gampaha
- Royal College Horana, Horana
- Joseph Vaz College, Wennappuwa
- Matale Hindu College, Mandandawela
- Nalanda Boys' Central College, Minuwangoda
- President's College, Maharagama
- Ranabima Royal College, Gannoruwa
- St. Aloysius College, Ratnapura
- St. Anthony's College, Wattala
- St. Mary's College, Chilaw
- St. Thomas' College, Matale
- St. Xavier's Boys' College, Mannar
- St. Xavier's College, Marawila
- St. Xavier's College, Nuwara Eliya
- Tangalle Boys' School, Tangalle
- Udupiddy American Mission College, Udupiddy
- Uva College, Badulla

Colombo

- Ananda College
- D.S. Senanayake College
- Isipathana College
- Mahanama College
- Nalanda College
- Royal College
- St. Benedict's College
- St. John's College
- St. Lucia's College
- St. Peter's College
- Thurstan College

Galle

- Mahinda College
- Richmond College
- St. Aloysius' College
- Vidyaloka College

Jaffna

- Jaffna Central College
- Jaffna Hindu College
- St. John's College
- St. Patrick's College

Kalutara

- Holy Cross College
- Kalutara Vidyalaya

Kandy

- Dharmaraja College
- Kingswood College
- Lumbini Royal College Kandy
- St. Sylvester's College
- Trinity College
- Wariyapola Sri Sumangala College

Kegalle

- Kegalu Vidyalaya
- St. Mary's College

Kurunegala

- Maliyadeva College
- St. Anne's College

Matara

- Rahula College
- St. Servatius' College
- St. Thomas' College

Moratuwa

- Prince of Wales' College
- St. Sebastian's College

Nugegoda

- St. Joseph's Boys' College
- St. John's College

Panadura

- Panadura Royal College
- Sri Sumangala College

Point Pedro

- Hartley College
- Velautham Maha Vidyalayam

== Switzerland ==
Former

- Villa St. Jean International School

== Taiwan (Republic of China) ==
- Taipei Municipal Chien Kuo High School, Taipei

== Tanzania ==
- Kibaha Secondary School, Kibaha

== Thailand ==
- Assumption College, Bang Rak
- Bangkok Christian College, Bangkok
- Debsirin School, Pom Prap Sattru Phai
- Saint Gabriel's College, Bangkok
- Suankularb Wittayalai School, Phra Nakhon
- Taweethapisek School, Bangkok Yai
- Vajiravudh College, Dusit
- Wat Suthiwararam School, Sathon

== Turkey ==
Former

- American Boys College (now International College, Beirut) (was in İzmir/Smyrna, moved to Lebanon)
- Lycée Saint-Joseph, Istanbul (became coeducational in 1987)

== Uganda ==
- Busoga College, Mwiri Hill
- Iganga Boys Boarding Primary School, Iganga
- Jinja College, Jinja
- Kigezi College Butobere, Kabale
- Kiira College Butiki, Butiki Hill
- Lango College, Lira
- Mbarara High School, Mbarara
- Namilyango College, Namilyango
- Nganwa High School, Kabwohe
- Ntare School, Mbarara
- St. Aloysius College, Nyapea
- St. Henry's College Kitovu, Masaka
- St. John Fisher Ibanda Secondary School, Ibanda
- St. Joseph's College Layibi, Gulu
- St. Joseph's College, Ombaci
- St. Leo's College Kyegobe, Fort Portal
- St. Mary's College Kisubi, Kisubi
- St. Peter's College Tororo, Tororo
- Teso College Aloet, Soroti

Former

- Sir Samuel Baker Secondary School

== Zambia ==
- Kitwe Boys Secondary School, Kitwe
- Luanshya Boys Secondary School, Luanshya
- St. Mary's Minor Seminary, Chipata

Former

- David Kaunda Technical High School (now coeducational)

== Zimbabwe ==
- Allan Wilson High School, Harare
- Bernard Mizeki College, Marondera
- Christian Brothers College, Bulawayo
- Churchill School, Harare
- Cranborne Boys High School, Harare
- Ellis Robins School, Mabelreign
- Gifford High School, Bulawayo
- Hamilton High School, Bulawayo
- Hartmann House Preparatory School, Harare
- Kutama College, Norton
- Mazowe Boys High School, Harare
- Peterhouse Boys' School, Mashonaland East
- Prince Edward School, Harare
- St Faith's School, Manicaland
- St. John's College, Borrowdale
- St. John's Preparatory School, Borrowdale
- St. George's College, Harare

Former

- Eagle School
- Mzingwane High School
- St. Stephen's College, Balla Balla

== By former countries ==
=== Ottoman Empire ===
Adrianople Vilayet

- Bulgarian Men's High School of Adrianople

Aydin Vilayet

- American Boys College (now International College, Beirut) (Smyrna (now İzmir))

Constantinople Vilayet

- Lycée Saint-Joseph, Istanbul

Salonika Vilayet

- Bulgarian Men's High School of Thessaloniki (Salonika)

== See also ==
- Lists of girls' schools
