= List of secondary schools in Mauritius =

The following is a list of notable secondary schools in Mauritius, Rodrigues and the outer islands.

== Mauritius ==
=== Zone 1 ===
Name	Acronym	Gender	Type	Study	Address
Abdul Hamid Golam Mohamed Issac State Secondary School	AHGMI	Girls	State	Grade 13	Chateau D'Eau
Adolphe De Plevitz State Secondary School	ADP	Boys	State	Grade 13	Sottise Rd, Grand Bay
Alpha College	AC	Mixed	Private aided	Grade 11	16 Poudrière Street, Port-Louis
Bhujoharry College Port-Louis	BCPL	Mixed	Private aided	Grade 13	1, La Tour Koenig Pointe aux Sables
City College Port-Louis	CCPL	Mixed	Private unaided	Grade 13	19, Dr Eugene Laurent St., Port Louis
Collège BPS Fatima	BPS	Mixed	Private aided	Grade 13	Avenue des Pommiers, Domaine du Moulin, Goodlands
Collège Idéal	CI	Mixed	Private aided	Grade 11	Sir S. Ramgoolam Street, Rivière du Rempart
Collège Père Laval	CPL	Boys	Private aided	Grade 13	Le Cornu Sainte Croix
Cosmopolitan College (Boys)	CCB	Boys	Private aided	Grade 13	Curé Road, Plaine des Papayes
Cosmopolitan College (Girls)	CCG	Girls	Private aided	Grade 13	Royal Road, Plaine des Papayes
Dayanand Anglo Vedic College	DAV	Mixed	Private aided	Grade 13	Royal Road, Morcellement St André
Dr. James Burty David State Secondary School	JBD	Boys	State	Grade 13	Old Moka Road, Bell Village
Dr. Jugroo Seegobin Dayanand Anglo Vedic College	JSDAV	Mixed	Private aided	Grade 13	1 Maharishi Dayanand Street, Port-Louis
Droopnath Ramphul State College	DRSC	Mixed	Academy	Grade 13	Souvenir, Calebasses, Pamplemousses
Ecole du Nord	EdN	Mixed	Private unaided	6eme-3eme	Labourdonnais Village, Mapou
Friendship College	FCB	Boys	Private aided	Grade 13	Telegu Temple Road, Goodlands
Friendship College	FCG	Girls	Private aided	Grade 13	D. Venkatasawmy Street, Goodlands
Goolam Mohamed Dawjee Atchia State College	GMD	Mixed	Academy	Grade 13	Boulevard Pitot, Monneron Hill, Port-Louis
Goodlands State Secondary School	GSSS	Boys	State	Grade 13	Royal Road, Goodlands
Immaculee Conception SSV	ICSSV	Boys	Vocational	Grade 13	Emyrne St. Marie Reine De La Paix, Port-Louis
Institute of Islamic & Secular Studies	IISS	Mixed	Private aided	Grade 13	7 - 9 Boule Auguste Ludovic Street, Ste Croix
International College	INC	Mixed	Private aided	Grade 13	8th Mile, Royal Road, Triolet
Islamic Cultural College	ICC	Boys	Private aided	Grade 13	60, Sir Edgar Laurent Street, Port-Louis
Islamic Cultural College Vallée des Prêtres	ICC-VDP	Mixed	Private aided	Grade 13	Sophia Road, Vallée des Prêtres
Jean Marie Frank Richard State Secondary School	JMFR	Girls	State	Grade 13	La Tour Koenig, Pte Aux Sables
Labourdonnais College	LAC	Mixed	Private aided	Grade 13	Bait Ul Noor Street, Vallèe des Pretres
Lady Sushil Ramgoolam State Secondary School	LSR	Girls	State	Grade 13	SSS Lane, 8th Mile, Triolet
Le Nid High School	LNHS	Mixed	Private unaided	Grade 11	Arsenal
Lighthouse Secondary School	LSS	Mixed	Private unaided	Grade 11	Albert Lane, Calebasses, Pamplemousses
London College	LOC	Mixed	Private aided	Grade 13	30 R. Seeneevassen Street, Port-Louis
Loreto College Port-Louis	LCPL	Girls	Private aided	Grade 13	11 Eugene Laurent Street, Port-Louis
Madad Ul Islam College	MUIIC	Girls	Private aided	Grade 11	70 Sir Edgar Laurent Street, Port-Louis
MEDCO Alex Bhujoharry Secondary School	MEDCO ABSS	Girls	Private aided	Grade 11	14 J. Nehru Street, Port-Louis
MEDCO Cassis Secondary School	MEDCO-CSS	Girls	Private aided	Grade 11	Cassis Road, Cassis, Port-Louis
Merton College	MC	Mixed	Private aided	Grade 13	Royal Road, Pamplemousses
Muslim Girls' College	MGC	Girls	Private aided	Grade 13	5 Dauphine Street, Port-Louis
Northfields International School	NIHS	Mixed	Private unaided	IGCSE	Labourdonnais Village, Mapou
OCEP College	OCEP	Mixed	Private unaided	Grade 13	3 Labourdonnais Street, Port-Louis
Pailles State Secondary School	PAISSS	Girls	State	Grade 13	Avenue Perruche, 3 Morcellement Raffray
Pamplemousses State Secondary School	PMSSS	Girls	State	Grade 13	Beau Plan, Pamplemousses
Piton State College	PSC	Boys	State	Grade 13	La Paix, Piton
Port Louis North State Secondary School	PLN	Boys	State	Grade 13	Sophia Lane, Cité La Cure, Port-Louis
Professor Hassan Raffa State Secondary School	PHR	Boys	State	Grade 13	Royal Road, Bois Pignolet, Terre Rouge
Renganaden Seeneevassen State Secondary School	RSSSS	Girls	State	Grade 13	Jenner Street, Port Louis
Rabindranath Tagore Secondary School	RTSS	Mixed	State	Grade 13	Ilot, D'epinay
Ramsoondar Prayag State Secondary School	RPSSS	Boys	State	Grade 13	Royal Road, Riviere du Rempart
Royal College Port Louis	RCPL	Mixed	Academy	Grade 13	Cassis, Port-Louis
Sharma Jugdambi State Secondary School	SJSSS	Girls	State	Grade 13	Royal Road, Goodlands
Shri Beekrumsingh Ramlallah State Secondary School	SBR	Boys	State	Grade 13	Railway Road, Mapou
Simadree Virahsawmy State Secondary School	SVSSS	Girls	State	Grade 13	Main Road, Riviere Du Rempart
Sir Abdool Razack Mohamed State Secondary School	SARM	Boys	State	Grade 13	La Poudriere Street, Port-Louis
Soondur Munrakhun College	SMC	Mixed	Private aided	Grade 13	Ruisseau Rose, Long Mountain
Saint Bartholomew's College	SBC	Mixed	Private aided	Grade 11	23, Dr A. Rouget Street, Port-Louis
Terre Rouge State Secondary School	TRSSS	Mixed	State	Grade 11	Royal Road, Bois Pignolet, Terre Rouge
Triolet State Secondary School	TSSS	Boys	State	Grade 13	8th Mile, SSS Lane, Triolet
Universal College	UC	Mixed	Private aided	Grade 13	Temple Road, Rivière du Rempart

=== Zone 2 ===
Name	Acronym	Gender	Type	Level	Address
Beau Bassin State Secondary School	BBSSS	Girls	State	Grade 13	5th, Mile Beau Bassin
Bel Air Riviere Séche State Secondary School	BASSS	Girls	State	Grade 13	Bel Air Rivière Sèche
Bon Accueil State College	BASC	Girls	State	Grade 13	Royal Road, Bon Accueil
Bhujoharry College Quartier Militaire	BCQM	Mixed	Private aided	Grade 11	Railway Road, Quartier Militaire
Camp de Masque State College	CMSC	Boys	State	Grade 13	Royal Road, Camp De Masque
Collège Bon et Perpétuel Secours	CBPS	Girls	Private aided	Grade 13	8 Cossigny Street, Beau-Bassin
Collège de la Confiance	CDLC	Boys	Private aided	Grade 13	Dr. Reid Street, Beau-Bassin
Darwin College	DC	Mixed	Private aided	Grade 13	Hospital Road Central Flacq
Ebene State Secondary School (Boys)	ESSSB	Boys	State	Grade 13	Ebène, Rose Hill
Ebene State Secondary School (Girls)	ESSSG	Girls	State	Grade 13	Ebène, Rose Hill
Gandhian Basic School	GBS	Mixed	Vocational	Grade 13	Bon Air Road, Villa Lane, Moka
John Kennedy College	JKC	Mixed	Academy	Grade 13	Vuillemin, Beau Bassin
Le Bocage International School	LBIS	Mixed	Private unaided	IB/IGSCE	Mount Ory, Moka
Loreto College Rose-Hill	LSRH	Girls	Private aided	Grade 13	Doctor Roux Street, Rose-Hill
Loreto College Saint Pierre	LCSP	Girls	Private aided	Grade 13	Royal Road, Saint Pierre
Lycee des Mascareignes	LM	Mixed	Private unaided	Grade 13	Helvetia Saint Pierre
Mahatma Gandhi Institute Secondary School	MGISS	Mixed	Academy	Grade 13	Moka
Mahatma Gandhi Secondary School Flacq	MGSSF	Mixed	State	Grade 13	Francois Mitterrand Saint, Central Flacq
Mahatma Gandhi Secondary School Moka	MGSSM	Mixed	State	Grade 13	Moka
Manilall Doctor State Secondary School	MDSSS	Girls	State	Grade 13	Overseas Road, Lallmatie
Marcel Cabon State Secondary School	MCSSS	Girls	State	Grade 13	Sir Francis Herchenroder street, Beau Bassin
Mayflower College	MFC	Mixed	Private aided	Grade 13	Belvédère Road, Brisée Verdière
Modern College	MC	Mixed	Private aided	Grade 13	Royal Road, Central Flacq
Nelson College	NC	Mixed	Private aided	Grade 11	L’Agrément, Saint Pierre
New Devton College	NDC	Mixed	Private aided	Grade 13	Meldrum Street, Beau Bassin
New Educational College	NEdC	Mixed	Private aided	Grade 13	Royal Road, Bel Air Rivière Sèche
New Eton College	NEC	Boys	Private aided	Grade 13	14 Inkerman Street, Rose-Hill
Patten College	PC	Girls	Private aided	Grade 13	39, Leoville L’Homme Street, Rose-Hill
Quartier Militaire State Secondary School	QMSSS	Girls	State	Grade 13	Royal Road, Quartier Militaire
Queen Elizabeth College	QEC	Mixed	Academy	Grade 13	VandermeerscH, Rose Hill
Rajcoomar Gujadhur State Secondary School	RGSSS	Girls	State	Grade 13	Ramchandar Road, Flacq
Ramnath Jeetah College (Boys)	RJCB	Boys	Private aided	Grade 13	Eastern College Street, Central Flacq
Ramnath Jeetah College (Girls)	RJCG	Girls	Private aided	Grade 13	Eastern College Street, Central Flacq
Royal Holloway College	RHC	Mixed	Private aided	Grade 11	Royal Road, Montagne Blanche
Saint Andrews College	SAC	Mixed	Private aided	Grade 13	35 Ambrose Street, Rose-Hill
Saint Mary's College	SMC	Boys	Private aided	Grade 13	Ambrose Street, Rose-Hill
Sebastopol State Secondary School	SSSS	Boys	State	Grade 13	Pellegrin, Sebastopol
Shrimati Indira Gandhi State Secondary School	SIG	Boys	State	Grade 13	Opposite District Council, Quartier Militaire
Sir Leckraz Teelock State Secondary School	SLT	Mixed	Academy	Grade 13	Francois Mittereand Street, Central Flacq

=== Zone 3 ===
Name	Acronym	Gender	Type	Level	Address
Bhujoharry College Rose Belle	BCRB	Mixed	Private aided	Grade 13	121 A, Royal Road, Rose-Belle
Curepipe College	CC	Boys	Private aided	Grade 13	4, Théodore Sauzier Street, Curepipe Road
Doha College Souillac	DCS	Mixed	Private aided	Grade 13	Dr. Sauzier Street, Souillac
Doha Secondary School	DSS	Mixed	Private aided	Grade 13	Giquel St., Engrais Cathan, Eau Coulée, Curepipe Road
Floréal State Secondary School	FSSS	Boys	State	Grade 13	Pierre Simonet Street, Floréal
Forest Side State Secondary School (Boys)	FSSSS	Boys	State	Grade 13	Icery Road, Forest Side
Forest Side State Secondary School (Academy)	FSSSSA	Mixed	Academy	Grade 13	Icery Road, Forest Side
France Boyer de la Giroday State Secondary School	FBG	Girls	State	Grade 13	L'escalier Road, Plaine Magnien
Hamilton College (Boys)	HCB	Boys	Private aided	Grade 13	Hollandais Street, Mahebourg
Hamilton College (Girls)	HCG	Girls	Private aided	Grade 13	A. K. Esoof Street, Mahebourg
Hindu Girls’ College	HGC	Girls	Private aided	Grade 13	50, Farquhar Street, Curepipe Road
Imperial College	IMC	Boys	Private aided	Grade 13	16 Boulevard Victoria, Forest Side
Keats College	KeC	Mixed	Private aided	Grade 13	Royal Road, Chemin Grenier
Loreto College Curepipe	LCC	Girls	Private aided	Grade 13	Commerford Street, Curepipe
Loreto College Mahebourg	LCM	Girls	Private aided	Grade 13	Pointe D’Esny Road, Mahebourg
Loreto College Bambous Virieux	LCBV	Mixed	Private aided	Grade 13	Ste Cécile St, Bambous Virieux
Lycee Labourdonnais	LLa	Mixed	Private unaided		Rue Rochecouste, Forest Side, Curepipe
Mahatma Gandhi Secondary School Nouvelle France	MGSSNF	Mixed	State	Grade 13	Link Road, La Vigie, Nouvelle France
Mootoocoomaren Sangeelee State Secondary School	MSSSS	Boys	State	Grade 13	Royal Road, Surinam
Notre Dame College	NDC	Girls	Private aided	Grade 13	Royal Road, Curepipe Road
Professor Soodursun Jugessur DAV College Rose Belle	PSJ-DAV	Mixed	Private aided	Grade 13	Morcellement Orchidee, Rose Belle
Renascence College	RC	Mixed	Private aided	Grade 11	22 Rivalland Lane, Curepipe
Riviere Des Anguilles State College	RDASC	Girls	State	Grade 13	Barrack Rd, Rivière Des Anguilles
Rose Belle State Secondary Vocational	RBSSV	Boys	Vocational	Grade 13	
Royal College Curepipe	RCC	Mixed	Academy	Grade 13	Royal Road, Curepipe
Saint Joseph’s College	SJC	Boys	Private aided	Grade 13	Commerford Street, Curepipe
Saint Aubin State Secondary School	SASSS	Boys	State	Grade 13	K. Sunassee Road, St. Aubin
Sookdeo Bissoondoyal State College	SBSC	Mixed	Academy	Grade 13	Chapel Rd, Rose-Belle
Swami Vivekananda State Secondary School	SVSSS	Girls	State	Grade 13	Lady Barkly St., Souillac
Windsor College (Boys)	WCB	Boys	Private aided	Grade 11	Royal Road, Mont Fertile, New Grove
Windsor College (Girls)	WCG	Girls	Private aided	Grade 13	Shivala Lane, Rose-Belle

=== Zone 4 ===
Name	Acronym	Gender	Type	Level	Address
Bambous State Secondary School	BMSSS	Boys	State	Grade 13	Avenue, Nairac, Bambous
Belle Rose State Secondary School	BRSSS	Girls	State	Grade 13	Ebène, Réduit
College du Saint-Esprit	CSE	Boys	Private aided	Grade 13	Sir Virgil Naz Avenue, Quatre Bornes
College Sainte-Marie	CSM	Mixed	Private unaided	Grade 13	Avenue Laseringue, Palma
Dr. Maurice Curé State College	DMC	Mixed	Academy	Grade 13	St Paul, Vacoas
Dr Regis Chaperon State Secondary School	DRC	Boys	State	Grade 13	Royal Road, Belle Rose
Eden College (Boys)	ECB	Boys	Private aided	Grade 13	Ollier Avenue, Quatre Bornes
Eden College (Girls)	ECG	Girls	Private aided	Grade 13	Royal Road, Belle Rose, Quatre Bornes
Gaetan Raynal State College	GRSC	Girls	State	Grade 13	Ave. Belle Rose, Quatre Bornes
La Gaulette State Secondary School	LGSSS	Mixed	State	Grade 13	Rémy Ollier Street, La Gaulette
Mahatma Gandhi Secondary School Solferino	MGSSS	Mixed	State	Grade 13	Shiv Shakti Ave., Solferino No. 5, Vacoas
New Eton College	NEC	Boys	Private aided	Grade 13	Rose Hill
Palma State Secondary School	PALSSS	Boys	State	Grade 13	Palma, Quatre Bornes
Phoenix State Secondary School	PHSSS	Boys	State	Grade 13	Closed Road, Phoenix
Quatre Bornes State Secondary School	QBSSS	Girls	State	Grade 13	Ave. Victoria, Quatre Bornes
Sir Abdool Raman Osman State College	SARO	Mixed	Academy	Grade 13	Closed Rd, Phoenix
Sodnac State Secondary School	SOSSS	Girls	State	Grade 13	Geoffroy Road, Bambous
Vacoas State Secondary School	VSSS	Boys	State	Grade 13	Hollyrood, Vacoas
Seewa Bappoo State Secondary School	SBSSS	Girls	State	Grade 13	Rodney Street, Vacoas

== Rodrigues & Agaléga ==
=== Zone 5 ===
Name	Acronym	Gender	Type	Level	Address
Ananias André Le Chou College	AALCC	Mixed	Private aided	Grade 13	Le Chou, Rodrigues
Grande Montagne College	GMC	Mixed	Private aided	Grade 11	Grande Montagne, Rodrigues
La Ferme College	LFC	Mixed	Private aided	Grade 11	Pistaches, Rodrigues
Maréchal College	MCR	Mixed	Private aided	Grade 13	Maréchal, Rodrigues
MEDCO Agalega Secondary School	MEDCO-ASS	Mixed	Private aided	Grade 11	Village Vingt-Cinq, North Island, Agaléga,
Mont Lubin College	MLC	Mixed	Private aided	Grade 13	Mont Lubin, Rodrigues
Rodrigues College	RC	Mixed	Private aided	Grade 13	François Leguat Street, Port Mathurin, Rodrigues
Songes College	SC	Mixed	Private aided	Grade 11	Songes, Rodrigues
Terre Rouge College	TRC	Mixed	Private aided	Grade 11	Terre Rouge, Rodrigues

== See also ==
- Education in Mauritius
- List of tertiary institutions in Mauritius
