= 1975 Mauritian student protests =

The 1975 Mauritian student protest riots refer to students' protest marches which turned violent in various parts of Mauritius on Tuesday 20 May 1975.

== Peaceful beginnings and objectives ==
Following detailed planning by high-school student activists, groups of students from various private and state schools abandoned their classrooms and went on strike by heading to the streets of the main towns where most secondary schools were located. They marched peacefully from the inland towns of Curepipe, Vacoas, Quatre-Bornes, Beau Bassin-Rose Hill and other parts of the island in order to head towards the capital city of Port Louis. The main objectives of the student activists during the rally consisted of the following:

1. Remove inequality between poorly funded "private colleges" when compared to state-funded schools and Catholic schools
2. Replace outdated content of textbooks which perpetuated a colonial bias
3. Improve the quality of teaching staff

== Riot police intervention ==
By the time that the student marchers had gone past the town of Beau Bassin the crowd had reached a significant size. At the now-historic bridge of Grand River North West (GRNW) near La Tour Koenig, local police prevented the crowd from progressing towards the capital city of Port Louis. Additionally, elements of the Police Riot Unit (PRU) had arrived on site and soon there was a crack-down. Tear gas and batons were used against unarmed student protesters. Several students were also arrested.

Several shops (such as the ones on Desforges and Leoville L’Homme Streets in the capital Port Louis) and buses near the rally were damaged. An angry crowd ransacked the home of prominent PMSD member of Parliament and member of the ruling coalition Jean Henry Ythier. Later that day, at New Eton College in Rose Hill, around fifty students were arrested after an intervention by the Police Riot Unit which attempted to disperse a gathering there. By 21 May 1975 the press reported that police had made 118 arrests. In addition to the looted shops there were reports of 40 damaged buses and 4 buses had been destroyed by arsonists.

The government was preparing to prosecute the arrested protesters under provisions of Sections 17 and 48 of the Public Order Act (POA). In response, a hunger strike was organised by a group of students and after ten days the charges were dropped.

== Events prior to the 1975 Riots ==
There had been mounting discontent amongst the young adults and students due to increasing unemployment and high cost of living. Furthermore, tropical cyclone Gervaise had damaged many schools which had already been suffering from poorly equipped laboratories and libraries and a lack of sporting infrastructure. In February 1975 students at London College (Mauritius) had protested against the dismissal of two teachers. The Labour-IFB-CAM coalition had been in power since the 1967 elections. However, after the March 1968 Independence celebrations, the IFB dropped out of the coalition in 1969 and ended up in the opposition. To maintain a majority of seats in Parliament, the leader of Labour Party struck a new deal with its rival PMSD which resulted in Labour-CAM-PMSD coalition ruling the country. Several members of PMSD were against this deal and that splinter group formed the new party UDM. Although elections were scheduled to occur in 1972, Labour and what was left of the original PMSD amended the Constitution via a Bill which postponed the 1972 elections to 1976. Meanwhile, the new party Mouvement Militant Mauricien (MMM) had gained popularity, even electing its first ever candidate Dev Virahsawmy to Parliament through the September 1970 by-elections at Constituency No.5. He won the seat previously held by IFB's deceased candidate Lall Jugnauth.

On 25 November 1971 the MMM political activist Azor Adelaide was shot dead by a gang of rival activists in the centre of the town of Curepipe near the intersection of Royal Road and Rue Chasteauneuf. Azor was travelling with in Dev Virahsawmy's car as they prepared to meet Paul Berenger to install some posters regarding an upcoming public gathering. This followed a previous attempt to assassinate MMM leader Paul Berenger during which his assistant Fareed Muttur died in suspicious circumstances after a car accident on 1 October 1971. Another example of political violence was the attack on student activist and MMM sympathiser Raja Bhadain who was stabbed by a PMSD thug wielding scissors at a public gathering.

MMM had collaborated with various trade unions such as GWF to organise strikes throughout the island. As a result, 12 Trade Union leaders and most leaders of MMM were jailed for 9 months until December 1972. A State of Emergency was declared in 1971 and the Public Order Act (POA 1973) was enforced. Later in 1975, the State of Emergency was lifted in preparation for the 1976 elections.

For several years prior to 1975 students from various secondary schools such as John Kennedy College (JKC), Queen Elizabeth College, Mauritius (QEC), New Eton College (NEC), Royal College Curepipe (RCC), and Royal College Port Louis (RCPL) had gathered at various student events where debates were held about the need to overhaul the educational system amongst other social and political issues. These events included the "cClubs". Other movements like the "Front National pour la Libération des Etudiants" (FNLE) and the Student Club assisted in the effort.

== Free education and educational reform ==
The May 1975 Students protest and riots resulted in significant changes in the educational system of the island. Following the 1976 General Elections the Labour-CAM-PMSD coalition government granted Free Education by eliminating the compulsory monthly school fees. It also undertook a reform of the secondary school sector in line with the objectives of the 20 May 1975 student protest and also included the following improvements:

1. The Private Secondary Schools Authority (PSSA) was created in 1978 to reduce the gap between private and public schools including wages of teaching staff
2. The Mauritius Institute of Education (MIE) overhauled curricula to include more local Mauritian content
3. The "Junior Scholarship" was replaced by Certificate of Primary Education (CPE)
4. Several new state secondary schools were built to reduce reliance on private colleges
