= Bon Accueil State College =

Coordinates: 20.1748°S 57.6761°E

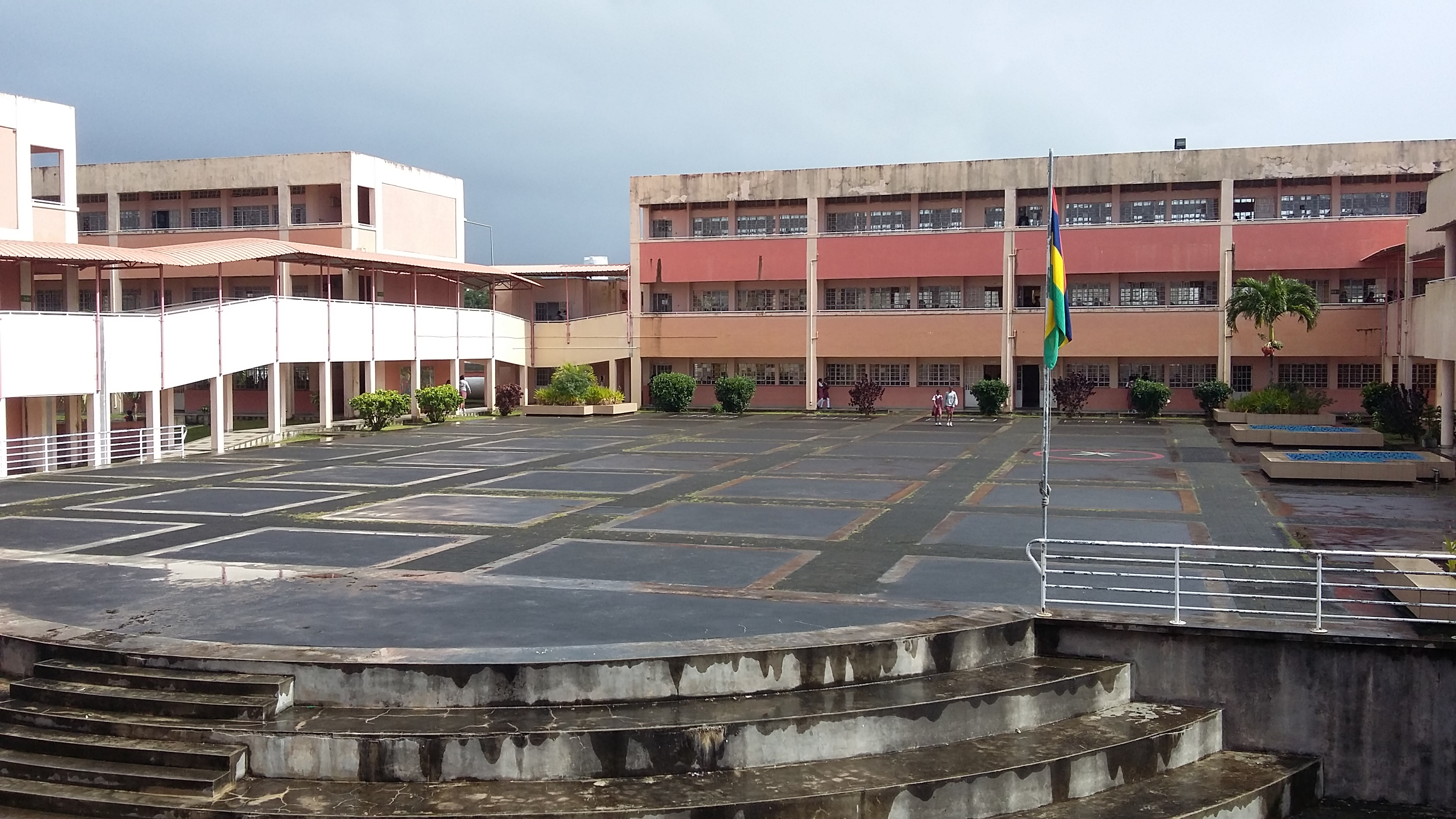
- Royal Road, Bon Accueil; Mauritius

Information
- Type: State secondary school
- Established: 11 January 2003
- Rector: Mr. Shobhanund JHAREE
- Staff: 17
- Faculty: 68
- Forms: I – VI
- Gender: Girls
- Enrollment: 851
- Website: basc.edu.govmu.org/English/Pages/default.aspx

Bon Accueil State College or Bon Accueil State Secondary School, S.S.S. Bon Accueil, is an academic secondary school for girls in Bon Accueil, in the Flacq district of Mauritius.

The school was established as a state sixth form college; the foundation stone was laid in December 2001 and the school opened on 11 January 2003 with 210 lower VI students. In January 2006 it was made a Form I–VI school and renamed to Bon Accueil State College. Nobel Prize winner Jean-Marie Leclézio visited the school as part of its tenth-anniversary celebrations. It specialises in the arts and has had among the best results in annual examinations.

The school's rector was Yahya Khoyrutty in 2011, when the school was named a Microsoft Pathfinder School and became one of the first in Mauritius to digitise its magazine, and in 2012. By 2013, the rector was Soobeeraj Parmessa, who later became rector of Sookdeo Bissoondoyal State College in Rose-Belle. In January 2020, the Ministry of Education announced the transfer of the rectors of Bon Accueil and Dr. Maurice Curé state colleges to different posts, prompting student demonstrations at both schools; the rector of Bon Accueil had been in the position for only a couple of weeks.
