= Merton College (disambiguation) =

Merton College, Oxford is one of the colleges of the University of Oxford, England.

Merton College may also refer to:

- Merton College, London, part of South Thames College, London, England
- Merton College (Mauritius), a secondary school in Mauritius
