= Eden College =

Eden College may refer to:

- Eden College (International) - based in London and Dublin, known for Visa scandal
- Eden College Durban, a college in Durban, South Africa
- Eden College Mauritius, a boy only and a girl only college in Mauritius
- Eden College of Technology, a computer information system Technology college in Bamenda Cameroon
- Eden Mohila College, a women's college in Dhaka, Bangladesh
- Eden College, a futsal club in the Republic of Ireland
- Eden Junior College, a college in India
