= FSCC =

FSCC is an abbreviation that can refer to:

- Faulkner State Community College, a two-year college located in Alabama
- Federation of Civil Service Unions, a trade union affiliate in Mauritius
- Fort Scott Community College, a two-year college located in Kansas
- Franciscan Sisters of Christian Charity, a congregation of Roman Catholic apostolic religious women

Fairthrope Sports Car Club

- Fort Saskatchewan Correctional Centre, a provincial correctional centre near Edmonton, Alberta
