= FPU =

FPU may stand for:

== Universities ==
- Florida Polytechnic University, in Lakeland, Florida, United States
- Franklin Pierce University, in New Hampshire, United States
- Fresno Pacific University, in California, United States
- Fukui Prefectural University, in Japan

== Other uses ==
- Federation of Progressive Unions, in Mauritius
- Federation of Trade Unions of Ukraine
- Fermi–Pasta–Ulam problem, former name of the Fermi–Pasta–Ulam–Tsingou (FPUT) problem
- Fishermen's Protective Union, a Newfoundland political party and service organization
- Floating-point unit, a computer component that handles mathematical operations on floating-point numbers
- Floor pick-up, a power supply scheme for bumper cars
- Progress Party's Youth (Norwegian: Fremskrittspartiets Ungdom, FpU)
