= Rivière du Rempart =

Rivière du Rempart may refer to several things in Mauritius:

- Rivière du Rempart District, and a village in the district
- Rivière du Rempart (river)
- AS Rivière du Rempart, a football club
