= James Burty David =

Member of the National Assembly of Mauritius (1951–2009)

The Honourable MP James Burty David GCSK
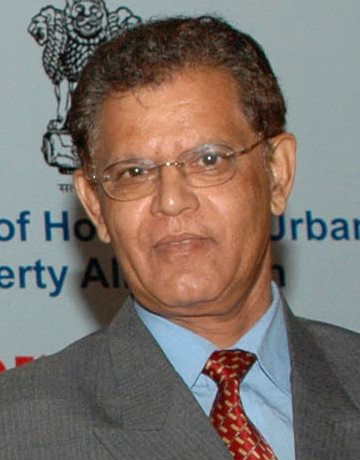

1995–1997 Minister of Education Science & Technology
- In office 15 December 1995 – 5 July 1997
- President: Cassam Uteem
- Prime Minister: Navin Ramgoolam

1997–2000 Minister of Local Government & Environment
- In office 5 July 1997 – 11 September 2000
- President: Cassam Uteem
- Prime Minister: Navin Ramgoolam

1995–2009 Minister of Local Government, Rodrigues and Outer Islands
- In office 5 July 2005 – Demised on 2005
- President: Sir Anerood Jugnauth
- Prime Minister: Navin Ramgoolam
- Succeeded by: Aimee Louis Hervé

Personal details
- Born: 16 April 1946 Mauritius
- Died: 13 December 2009 (aged 63) Mauritius
- Party: Mauritian Labour Party
- Spouse: Mrs Lilette David née Seenyen
- Children: Fabrice & Crystèle
- Parent: Ézéchiel et Sylvia David
- Occupation: Rector; Journalist (Freelance); Educational TV Lecturer; Author; Minister

Hon James Burty David GCSK MP was a Mauritian politician. David received his Diploma in Education at the University of London and doctorate at the University of Bordeaux. He joined the Labour Party in 1964, which he served successively as president, secretary general and director of communication. David was minister of education from 1995 to 1997, Minister of Environment and local authorities from 1997 to 2000 and Minister of Local Government, Rodrigues and Outer Islands since 2005. He was a journalist of Freelance, teacher and afterwards rector at Eden College and an author of many school manuals in French. In 2010 he was awarded the Grand Commanders of the Order of the Star and Key of the Indian Ocean (GCSK) for remarkable contribution in the political, social and educational fields.
