= New Eton College =

Secondary school in Mauritius

Coordinates: 20.2431°S 57.4722°E

The New Eton College (NEC) is a private secondary school in Rose Hill, Mauritius. Founded in 1932, it provides education to the boys of Rose Hill and surrounding regions. The College was owned by the Société Goinsamy Venkatasamy and subsequently managed by Late Vijaynathan Venkatasamy (better known as Vijay Venkatasamy) until 1980, himself a past student of the New Eton College and a graduate of Chemistry and Physics from Hull University, UK. He obtained his degree in 1961.

Today, the school is run by the New Citizens Co Ltd with a Board constituting Educators and Ex-Educators, managed by a professional manager appointed by the company.

Sir Anerood Jugnauth, former Prime Minister of Mauritius, also known as the father of the economic miracle, was employed as a teacher of the College in 1949.

Notable alumni include Vishnu Lutchmeenaraidoo, former Deputy Prime Minister and Minister of Finance of Mauritius as well as Prithvirajsing Roopun, former President of Mauritius, Me. Rishi Pursum, Senior Counsel and former president of the Bar Council, Dr. Om Varma, former Director of the Mauritius Institute of Education and Chairperson of the Open University of Mauritius, Dr. Rajen Murugan Fellow IEEE, Dallas, USAelectromagnetic researcher.

During the 1975 Mauritian student protests riot police arrested a number of students of the New Eton College. The New Eton College had become a real center of protest in May 1975. On May 20, 1975, the news that student protestors were going to march towards Port Louis came from the New Eton College. The school's principal, Vijay Venkatasamy, did not hesitate to let his students leave. The students' mobilization was complete. In January 1977, Sir Seewoosagur Ramgoolam, the then Prime Minister, surely tired of hearing of student dissatisfaction came forward with a bold decision. Secondary education was declared free for all.

Some students of New Eton College have been "Laureates" at the end of their Higher School Certificate (Mauritius) examinations. The New Eton College is the first and only secondary school of Mauritius to have produced a "Super Laureate" (Science and Economics streams concurrently) by the name of Soobhaschandra Sobnack.

The College pioneered new disciplines in the secondary school curriculum in the 60s and 70s. These were Technical Drawing (including Industrial Arts), Surveying, Electricity and Electronics, Economics, Physical Science, Statistics, Sociology and Law. The New Eton College was the first institution of Mauritius to introduce Sociology at Advanced level in 1980 at the request of 3 students headed by Yajnyandra Nath Varma.

In 2015, the school won the top prize for the "science mural" contest, an initiative of the Rajiv Gandhi Science Centre (RGSC) in collaboration with the Indian High Commission and the Indira Gandhi Centre for Indian Culture. The aim was to encourage students of Form V and Lower VI from secondary schools around the country who had opted for Art subjects to conduct research on topics of scientific interest and demonstrate their creative and artistic skills.

In 2024, the New Eton College distinguished itself with a remarkable performance in the Technology Educational Stream (TES) achieving a 100% pass rate, with 20 students who sat for the exams. The new TES (Technological Studies) program offered students an alternative to the traditional curriculum. It allowed them to specialize in technological fields after the 9th year.

== See also ==
- List of secondary schools in Mauritius
- Education in Mauritius
