= Municipal Council of Quatre Bornes =

Coordinates: 20.265357°S 57.479053°E

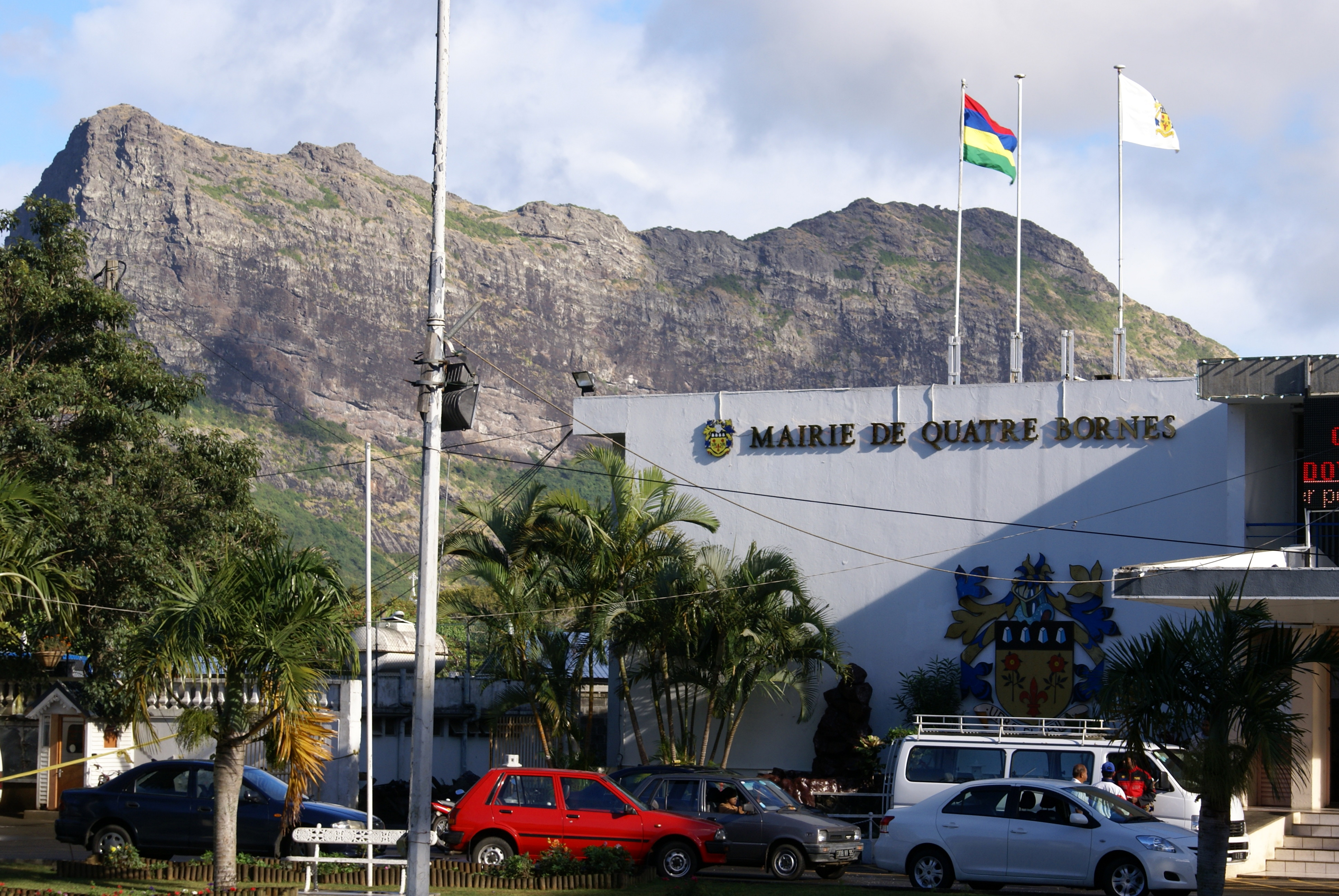
The Municipal Council of Quatre Bornes

The Municipal Council of Quatre Bornes (French: Conseil Municipal de Quatre Bornes) is the local authority responsible for the administration of the town of Quatre Bornes, Plaines Wilhems District, Mauritius.

In 2015, three former councilors were convicted of conflict of interest.

== Municipal elections ==
According to the Local Government Act 2011 PART III Section 11, election of councillors to Municipal Town Council shall be held in 2012 and thereafter every 6 years on such date as the President appoints.

The council is composed of 15 councillors including the Mayor and Deputy Mayor who is elected for a period of 2 years, while each of the councillors represent wards throughout the town. In the last elections in November 2012 the town was subdivided into 5 wards, the number of registered voters was 57,474.
