= College Sainte-Marie (Mauritius) =

Location
- Avenue Laseringue, Palma; Quatre Bornes, Mauritius
- Coordinates: 20.281532°S 57.447528°E

Information
- School type: Secondary School
- Religious affiliation: Catholic
- Established: 17 January 2005
- School district: Plaines Wilhems
- Rector: Mr Joseph Chowriamah
- Classes offered: Form 1 - Upper 6
- Language: English, French, Creole

College Sainte-Marie is a private secondary school based in Quatre Bornes, Mauritius. Students are prepared for the School Certificate and the Higher School Certificate.

The school began enrolling students in September 2004.

The school was scheduled to open on 17 January 2005, with priority given to students attending primary schools in Curepipe and Vacoas and with monthly tuition being 3,800 Rs.

== See also ==
- Education in Mauritius
- List of secondary schools in Mauritius
