= Dr James Burty David SSS =

Dr James Burty David State Secondary School
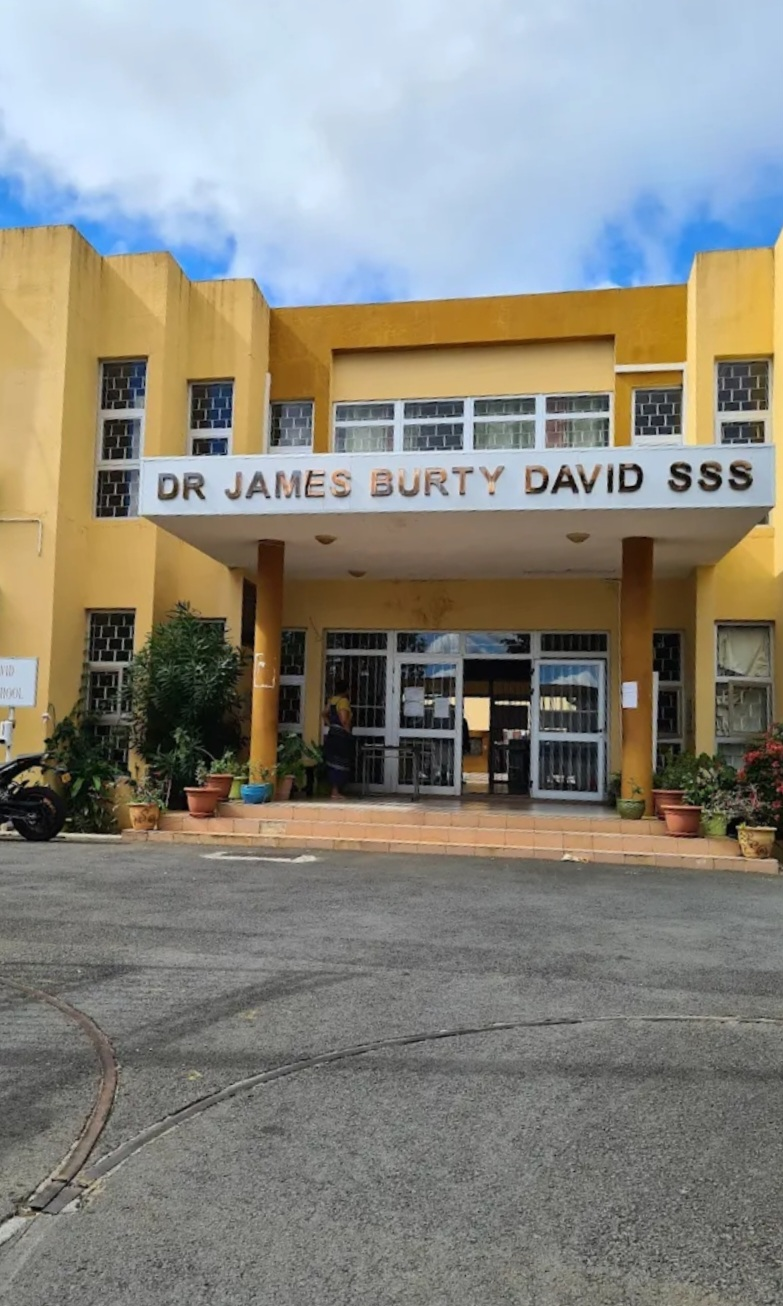

Location
- Old Moka Road, Bell Village; Bell Village; Port Louis, Mauritius
- Coordinates: 20.174485°S 57.483765°E

Information
- School type: Secondary School
- Motto: Creativity Empowerment Integration
- Established: January 2003
- School district: Port Louis District
- Authority: Ministry of Education
- School number: (+230) 2132921
- Rector: Mr S Bisoonauth(2026)
- Gender: Boys
- Classes: 42 normal class 2 Chemistry Laboratory 2 Biology Laboratory 2 Physics Laboratory 1 Library 1 Mini hall 1 Art Class 2 Computer Laboratory 2 DT Class 2 Workshop 1 FDTX Class
- Classes offered: Form 1 - Upper 6
- Schedule: 8:00-14:30
- Hours in school day: 6hr30min
- Area: 2350m²
- Houses: Red/Blue/Yellow/Green
- Colours: Blue and White
- Nickname: JBD SSS

Dr James Burty David State Secondary School is a state secondary school based in Bell Village, Port Louis, Mauritius. Students are prepared for the School Certificate and the Higher School Certificate. The school was previously known as the Bell Village SSS.

== History ==
James Burty David SSS was built in 2002 and was inaugurated by the Ministry of Education and the Honorable Mr. Rashid Beebeejaun among others. In the light of the educational reforms, with emphasis on regionalisation, a number of new state secondary schools were implanted across the island. JBDSSS, like many others new establishment became functional in January 2003. The institution had at that time only ten classrooms and the number of student was 185.

The college compound occupies an area of 2,350 square metres, a plot of terrain occupied by the Forest Department, Ministry of Agriculture. The JBD SSS was built by Pad & Co Company LTD to the tune of Rs 80 million. The full-fledged building was handed over to the Ministry of Education and Human Resources by the Ministry of Infrastructure on 13 November 2003. It was inaugurated by the President of the Republic, the Honorable Sir Anerood Jugnauth and in the presence of various Ministers namely: Education, Steve Obeegadoo, Infrastructure, Anil Kumar Bachoo and of Women's Rights, Mrs. M.A Navarre Marie, and Members of the National Assembly J.C. Barbier and J.C L.D Armanc.

In December 2010 the school which was previously known as the Bell Village SSS was renamed as James Burty David SSS in honor of the former Minister of the Government James Burty David, a man who dedicated his life to two passions: politics and education.

== Infrastructure ==
- Computer rooms
- DC/DT workshops
- Art room
- Option Rooms
- Library
- Audiovisual rooms
- 2 canteens

== See also ==
- Education in Mauritius
- List of secondary schools in Mauritius
