= National Trade Unions Confederation =

Mauritian trade union center

NTUC
- National Trade Unions Confederation
- Headquarters: Port Louis, Mauritius
- Location: Mauritius
- Affiliations: International Trade Union Confederation

The National Trade Unions Confederation (NTUC) is a national trade union center in Mauritius.

The two primary affiliates of NTUC are the Federation of Civil Service Unions, and the Organization of Artisans' Unity.

NTUC is affiliated with the International Trade Union Confederation.

== Organization of Artisans' Unity ==
OAU
- Organization of Artisans' Unity
- Headquarters: Port Louis, Mauritius
- Location: Mauritius
- Members: 2700
- Key people: Roy Ramchum, general secretary
- Affiliations: NTUC

The Organization of Artisans' Unity (OAU) is one of two primary trade union affiliates of the NTUC. Based in the tea and sugar industries, the OAU also represents workers in the textile, as well as hotel and catering sectors.
