= Republic Bashkir Boarding School =

- Республиканский башкирский лицей-интернат
- Ufa, Bashkortostan; Russia

Information
- School type: Boys only secondary school for gifted and talented
- Established: 1992
- Principal: Fanil Nuriev
- Gender: Male
- Age range: 12-16
- Average class size: 23
- Language: English, Russian, Bashkir, Turkish
- Color: Dark blue
- Mascot: Boy holding globe above his head
- National ranking: Top 5 in Bashkortostan
- Newspaper: Aktamir
- Website: www.rbli.ru

The Republic Bashkort Boarding School (RBBS) is an educational institution for gifted students aged 12–16, located in Ufa, Bashkortostan, Russia.

== History ==
The school was founded in 1992 as Republic Bashkort-Turkish Lycee. First graduation took place in 1996.

Single-gender education. Only boys are admitted to the school, though at some point three experimental girl classes were formed. They graduated in 2006 and 2007 and experiment was closed, because female department of school was not provided with separate building needed to maintain high-quality education standards, although Local Education Authority has promised to do so before. Nowadays, RBBS continues to be boys only school.

== Curriculum ==
The school implements content and language integrated learning (CLIL) method for delivering curriculum for main subjects like mathematics, physics, chemistry and computer science. Medium of instruction is English.
