= Lumbini Royal College Kandy =

Location
- Central Province; Sri Lanka
- Coordinates: 7.275261°N 80.616540°E

Information
- Type: Public national
- School district: Kandy
- Gender: Boys

Lumbini Royal College Kandy is a national school in Kandy, Sri Lanka.

== See also ==
- List of schools in Central Province, Sri Lanka
