= New Educational College =

Secondary school in Mauritius

Coordinates: 20.258°S 57.758°E

Information
- School type: Private Secondary School
- Established: 1961; 64 years ago

New Educational College (NEC) was founded in 1961 and is a private secondary school in Bel Air, Rivière Sèche, Mauritius.

== See also ==
- List of secondary schools in Mauritius
- Education in Mauritius
