= Rivière des Créoles =

River in Mauritius

Coordinates: 20°24′S 57°41′E

Rivière des Créoles is a river in southeastern Mauritius. It flows southeast for 13 kilometres, reaching the Indian Ocean close to the town of Mahébourg.
