= Saint Mary's College, Mauritius =

Secondary school in Mauritius

Coordinates: 20.24°S 57.47°E

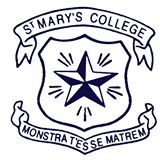

The Saint Mary's college is a Catholic, secondary school for boys in Mauritius based in Rose-Hill. The college is known for diversity of its students enrollment, students who performed well at the CPE exam. Another campus was built lately named Saint Mary's West.

== History ==
Bishop Daniel Liston approached the Brothers of the Irish District while on holiday in his native country in 1951 about setting up a Catholic college for the region of Beau Bassin-Rose Hill. On 24 March 1951 Bro. Columban, Director of St. Joseph's College, complained to the Provincial of Ireland, Bro. Aloysius O'Brien, about the shortage of good teaching Brothers in his school. On 7 May 1951 Bro. Aloysius wrote to Bishop Liston offering his support for the proposed secondary school. Liston replied that he had bought a site of 3 1/2 acres, 3/4 of a mile from the centre of Rose Hill, next to the railway station, bus route and the Church. This site was Summerfield in Beau Bassin, later taken over by the Congregation du Bon et Perpetuel Secours to establish a secondary school for girls, 'College du B.P.S.'.

A new site was found at the corner of Ambrose and Gordon streets, Rose Hill, behind the Plaza and Municipal grounds. The first classrooms were erected along Gordon Street, and later the hall with classrooms above along Ambrose Street, thus exposed to the noise of heavy traffic. In a proposed contract marked 'Submitted to the Regime, 26 March 1953', Liston said that the Bishop of Port Louis invites the Brothers to open a secondary school at RoseHill, that he had procured a 4 1/2 acre site which should serve for about 4 years, and undertook to build a college with a residence for the Brothers before the end of that time. The ownership of the house and College and of the property was to remain vested in the Diocese, but given rent-free to the Brothers, who guaranteed to provide staff for the College.

Bro. Benedict Lynch (assisted by a Mr. Le Chartier) received 31 boys on the opening day of the College, 25 January 1954. In describing the event to Bro. Aloysius, Provincial, at the end of the month, Bro. Benedict mentioned that it was a good thing that the classes had started in 1954 and not 1953. The extra year had given time to turn the 'luxurious jungle and quarry into a football field'.

== Approval ==
St. Mary 's College was approved as a secondary school, with effect from January 1955. The College was officially inaugurated on 20 April 1955 by Lady Scott, wife of the Governor, Sir Robert Scott.

== Staffing difficulties ==
On 26 September 1958 Bro. Benedict wrote to Bro. Aloysius saying that after five years the College had no graduate, and that the failure to provide a science teacher was a violation of the only obligation which the Brothers contracted in undertaking the direction of the College. At the time graduates, and especially science teachers were very much in demand.

== Early teachers ==
Bro. Peter Foster taught in St. Mary's from 1954 to 1959, from 1965 to 1969 and again after taking out a degree at the University of Cork, from 1972 to 1974. His chief contribution was the organisation of the Classical Side of the College, apart from music, drama and laying out of the grounds.

Bro. Patrick Byrne, born 3 August 1920 in Co. Carlow, taught in St. Mary's from 1957 to 1962, and at St. Joseph's from 1963 to 1975. Besides having a full teaching schedule he was the 'handyman' at St. Mary's putting up blackboards and notice boards, painting the old dwelling house, fixing taps, lights and switches at strategic points, mending doors, windows and partitions.

Bro. Benedict Lynch set out to return to Ireland via South Africa on 31 March 1959. Less than an hour before he left the results of the 1958 School Certificate arrived, 9 passes out of 10, from the first group of pupils who joined the College when it opened in January 1954. Bro. Remi Carosin moved from St. Joseph's College to become Director of St. Mary's on the following day and continued the development of the College until 1970. A start was made on the extension of the buildings on 3 November 1959.

Cyclone Alix on 19 January 1960 blew down the verandah of the Residence, an old wooden colonial house, and weakened the whole building considerably. Cyclone Carol on the last day of February 'devastated everything in its way – houses, churches and schools'. The College reopened only on 7 March. The work on the extension was delayed, and in January 1961 it was decided to build two stories of classrooms above the hall which was being constructed along Ambrose Street.

In 1961 Bro. Remi, accompanied by the Principals of four other Colleges, met the Minister of Education on 22 June and 10 July and discussed the possibility of 80% grant towards the salaries of three graduates; this was not agreed to until July 1962, retroactive to January of that year. Up to then the College had subsisted on fees and the proceeds of fairs, with the Roman Catholic Diocese of Port Louis assuming responsibility for capital expenditure. At times the school was full to capacity.

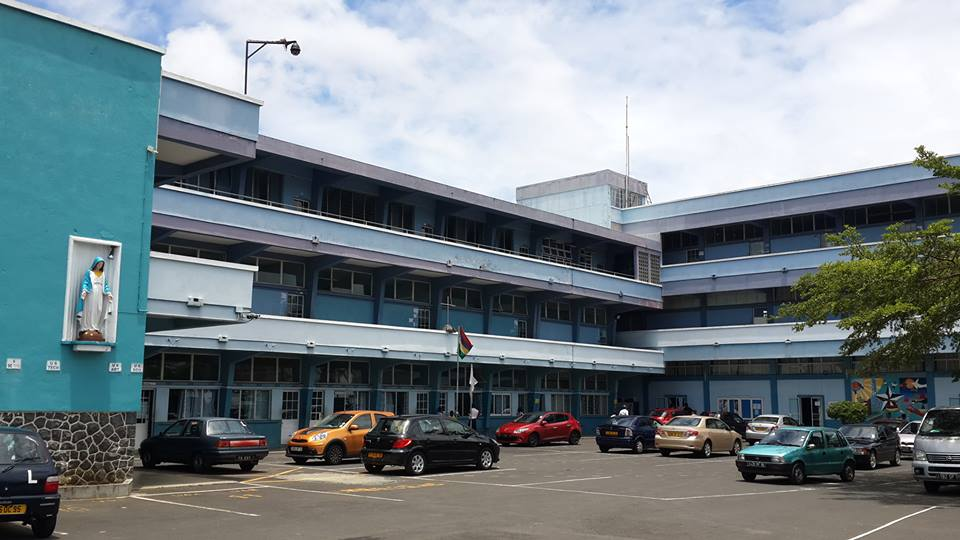

== Site improvement and Extension ==
The Diocese of Port Louis paid for the building of the school, but there was little or no money available for the development of the grounds, but a number of the Brothers in the earlier years spent much time on this. Gradually after the independence, the major of the Diocese of Port Louis ceased and the development of the college was funded mainly through the parent-teacher association internally. for the resumption of studies on 16 January 1962, are given as: 355 pupils, 7 Brothers (including 2 in St. Enfant Jesus Primary School) and 7 lay teachers. On the 13 March the first pass in the H.S.C. was announced, and a week later 56 S.C. passes. The extension of hall with classrooms above was officially opened on 2 May. Hon. A. Beejadhur, Minister of Education, cut the tape and Bishop Liston blessed the building. On 9 October Mgr. J. Margeot, V.G. blessed the library in one of the rooms in the extension.

St. Mary's nowadays has adequate buildings and grounds with a tennis court, 2 football ground, 5 basketball courts, 4 volleyball courts and 1 handball ground. On 18 July 1962 a letter from the Ministry of Education granted St. Mary's College 'A Status' for both Classical and Science studies. The following day Bro. Donard Fergus returned to Mauritius and joined the staff of St. Mary's, having already taught for 6 years in St. Joseph's.

== Old boys ==
The first meeting of the Old Boys Association took place on 3 February 1963, and the first Staff Dinner on 18 May. HSC results showed 3 passes and the SC 28 passes.

On 25 January 1964 the first annual prize-giving was held. The Exam results are given as HSC 5/14 and SC 32/36. The first parent-teacher association meeting was held on 14 July.

The College reopened on 13 January 1965 with 440 pupils. Exam results are recorded: HSC 7/13 and SC 45/52. Th

Nowadays the Old Boys Association frequently organises gathering at the college and capitalises their connection. Former students who became famously known are namely Arvin Bollell, Harish Balgobin, Jocelyn Renaud le Père Eddy Coosnapen, Antoine Law and Ian Ernest among others. Hence the Old Boys Association became through the time an important association due to the well-established and diversified occupation of former students.

== Athletic meeting ==
On 19 March St. Mary's lost by five points, 113 to 118, at an athletics meeting with the much longer-established St. Joseph's College. The year ended with Bro. Peter's Junior Football team winning the Quatre Bornes Tournament open to 42 teams.

The first HSC Classical class commenced on 11 January 1966. 90% success was announced in March for SC. Bro Allen Richard McNamee, newly elected Assistant Superior General paid his first visit and promised to the Brothers in Mauritius: to keep in mind (i) a new residence for the Brothers in Rose Hill, (ii) more Brothers for Mauritius. Bro. Peter produced Christmas Carols on Radio and TV.

In 1967 the exam results for the previous year were given as: HSC 40%, SC 80.2%.

On 27 October and 5 November Bro. Remi presented programmes on TV about the canonisation in Rome of Bro. Benilde, a Frenchman, the first Brother so honoured by the Church since the Founder, St. De La Salle in 1900. About 12 have since been added, apart from a larger number who have been beatified.

The year of Independence, 1968, opened with some riots in Port Louis. Schools were closed from 21 January to 1 February.

In May 1969 Bro. Antel, World Organiser of Past Pupils Unions in the schools of the Brothers visited Mauritius. Bro. Peter left for University studies in Cork and was replaced by Bro. Michael Mackey. A new Basketball court was constructed and the Football field enlarged. On 21 December Bro. Michael took over as Director of St. Mary's and Bro. Remi became Director of College de la Confiance. He had been involved in the preparations for the opening of this establishment for over two years.

The question of a new residence for the Brothers in Rose Hill came to a head at the Irish District Retreat held in Navan in July 1970. Permission was given to the Brothers in Mauritius to explore the possibility of collecting the necessary funds but little faith was placed in renewed promises of help from Rome. A suitable site would have to be found outside the grounds of the College belonging to the Diocese. A plot of ground 182 by 84 ft (55 by 26 m) containing the ruins of three houses existed just across Ambrose Street from the main gate of the College. Enquiries were made and the plot was purchased for Rs. 40 000 on 6 September 1971.

The Community were of the opinion that 8 Brothers were required for the good running of the College so Gustave Rey drew up plans for a house with 9 bedrooms en suite. The Brothers of the three Communities were invited by the Director Bro. Michael to give their views on the proposed plan. When it was agreed to proceed, Bros. Michael and Anthony informed Bishop J. Margeot during the priests' Retreat at Foyer de L'Unité. In July 1972 the foundation stone was blessed. The building was completed and the Brothers took up residence at Easter 1973. The total cost was recorded as Rs. 280 000. For the next three years in the History Bro. Michael acknowledged with thanks financial support from the Irish District and from St. Joseph's Community. The Rose Hill Community reduced their expenses to a minimum, to help to pay off the debt. The small house in the grounds of the College was given over for offices, changing rooms and an Audio Visual Centre.

The College reopened in 1974 with 630 pupils and 23 teachers including 5 Brothers. The subject Biology had to be dropped from the HSC options as no teacher was available. In January the 21st anniversary of the College was celebrated with an exhibition of Photographs, and some new books were purchased for the library of the Community.

== Student unrest ==
Student unrest caused the classes to be suspended for a while in May 1975. Bro. Michael Mackey left for Ireland in July and Bro. John Cashman, B.Sc. became Principal. Bro. Stephen Farrell arrived to become Director of the Community in August, thus separating the two posts for the first time. Pupils and teachers donated 38 pints to the Blood Bank to help a pupil who was ill.

In May 1976 new equipment was provided for the Science Laboratories, the Audio Visual Room, and for Sports. The announcement of Free Secondary Education in December 1976 came to the rescue of St. Mary's.

January 1977 saw an increase in the numbers of Staff and pupils. Payment by the Government was 'on the basis of 1976 fees' but now every pupil was being paid for in full. More equipment was purchased and repairs were carried out to the roof, electrical installations and to the playground. A lay teacher in the College, Mr. Paul Cheung, became Principal but the Brothers were still responsible with Bro. John Cashman as Manager.

For some unknown reason the sending of Historical Supplements to Rome by the Communities in Ireland and Mauritius ceased in 1977. No later Historical documents have been found. It is known that Father Hervé de St. Pern became Manager of St. Mary's College as from January 1983 when Bro. John Cashman departed to become Principal of College de la Confiance. Mr. Paul Cheung remained Principal of St. Mary's College, thus the changeover was hardly noticed. The Brothers' house was handed over to the Diocese and became Foyer La Source. Stephen, a long time groundsman moved in as caretaker. No doubt, Rover missed the Brothers.

== See also ==
- List of secondary schools in Mauritius
- Education in Mauritius
