= Patten College =

- Mauritius

Information
- Type: secondary school
- Gender: Boys

Patten College is a private, aided secondary school located in Rose Hill, Mauritius , split into separate campuses for boys and girls. The college was founded by Mr. S.A. Patten, a former Minister and Mayor of Beau-Bassin/Rose-Hill, who initially established the "Ecole du Dimanche" to support working-class students.

== See also ==
- List of secondary schools in Mauritius
