= Le Bocage International School =

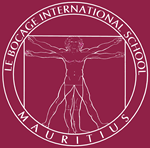
- LBIS LOGO

Location
- Mount Ory, Moka, Mauritius; 20.215°S 57.505°E

Information
- Type: Private International School
- Motto: Quod Bono Est Bonos Facit (Latin) That which is good creates good people (English)
- Established: 1990
- Headmaster: Dr Nigel J Winnard
- Staff: 88
- Gender: Mixed School
- Age: 11 to 19
- Enrolment: 808
- Colour
- Website: http://www.lebocage.net/

Le Bocage International School (LBIS) is an English-medium, private international school offering a values-led education to approximately 800 students from the ages of 11–19.

LBIS was founded in 1990 and is located at Mount Ory, Moka (Mauritius). LBIS is an IB school that offers the International Baccalaureate Programmes for the Middle Years, form 1–5, and the Diploma years, form 6–7. It also prepares students for the IGCSE and the International Baccalaureate examinations.

== Facilities ==
The school has more than forty teaching rooms including four science laboratories (physics laboratory, chemistry laboratory, biology laboratory), three computer rooms, two art studios, three Design & Technology workshops, a home economics laboratory and a large purpose-built library with a host of about 9,500 resources ranging from science books to fictional books with a floor dedicated to online research. In addition it has facilities such as a music room, a recording studio as well as a theatre in its new performing arts building.

Outdoor facilities include playing fields, outdoor hard court surfaces and a multi-purpose sports hall (MPH), which also functions as an auditorium for the many special events held each year such as International Night, Graduation Ceremony and National Day.

== Enrollment and student body ==
Enrollment Type	Number (approx.)
Middle School	450
High School	350
Faculty	88

Students are enrolled in Forms 1–7 (UK years 7–13, US grades 6–12) that comprise approximately twenty-seven nationalities. Students come from a wide variety of social and cultural backgrounds, and most are bilingual. 89% of the students are Mauritian.

== Accreditation ==
LBIS is accredited by the Mauritian Ministry of Education and is a fully accredited member of the Council of International Schools (CIS) and the Middle States Association.

== Governance ==
LBIS is operated by PROGOS, a non-profit making company that exists solely for the purpose of offering an English medium international education. The board of directors is the ultimate authority and delegates management of the school to the Head of School.

== Teaching staff and posts of responsibility ==
The school employs approximately 88 qualified teachers. There are also librarians, careers counsellors, guidance counsellors, an inclusion team and a school nurse.

Curriculum responsibilities are shared by Heads of Department in eight key learning areas and the coordinators of the IB Middle Years, IGCSE, IB Careers-related Programme and IB Diploma Programmes of study.

== Language policy ==
The school is an English medium school.

== Academic programme ==
The school prepares students for higher education in Mauritius, or abroad. There are three developmental levels of learning adopted, which are as follows:

- Forms 1–3 The IB Middle Years Programme (MYP) Contents Standards Framework Curriculum based on 8 key learning areas
- Forms 4–5 The IGCSE pathway or continuation of The IB Middle Years Programme (MYP)
- Forms 6–7 The IB Diploma Programme or IB Careers-related Programme, with B-TECH coursework specializing in Business or Physical Education.

== Notable students ==
Zain Mallam-Hasham- Most Decorated Prefect in Bocage History Affectionately nicknamed "Mr Aura"

== Gallery ==
Le Bocage
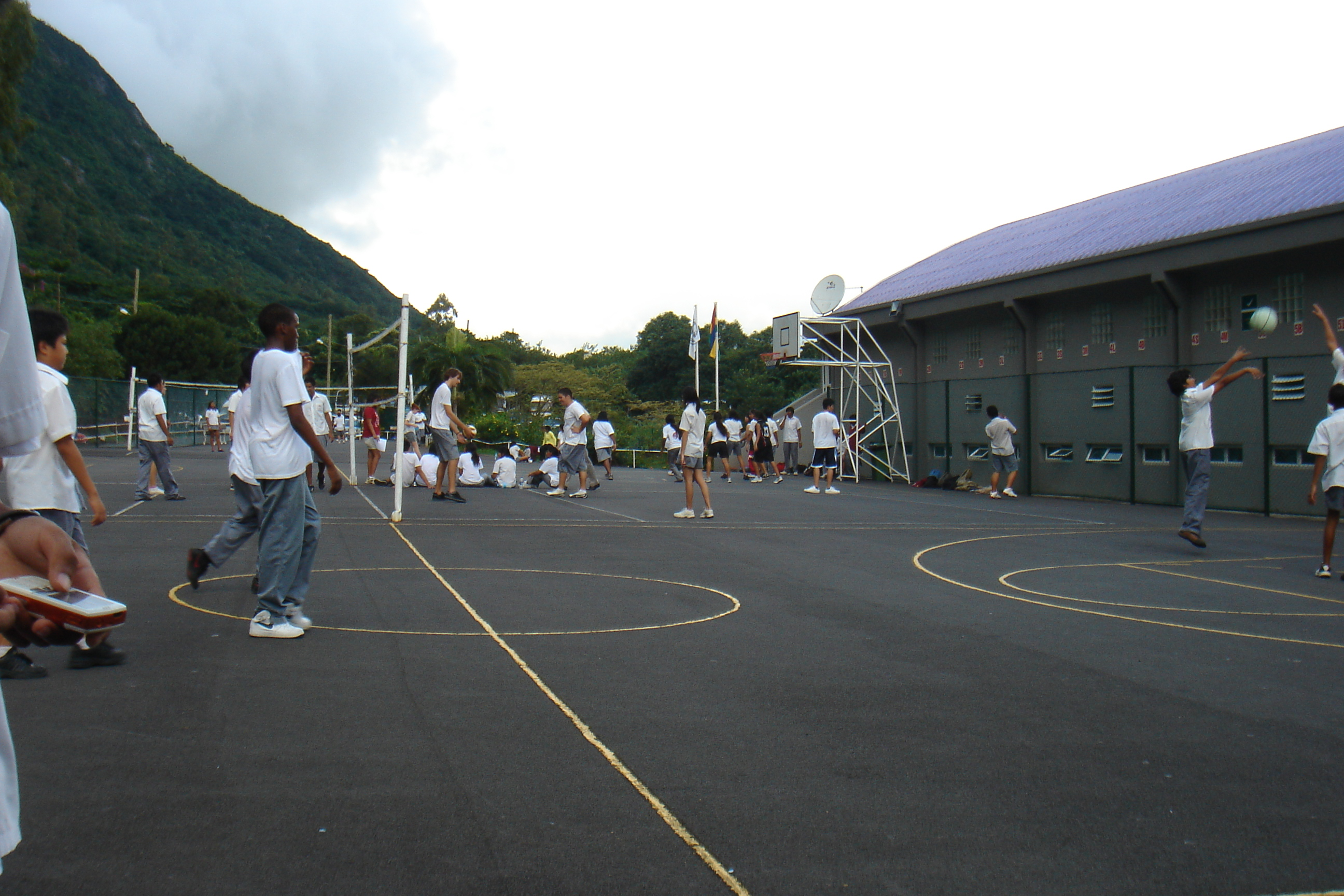
Le Bocage Upper Tarmac (c.) 2009

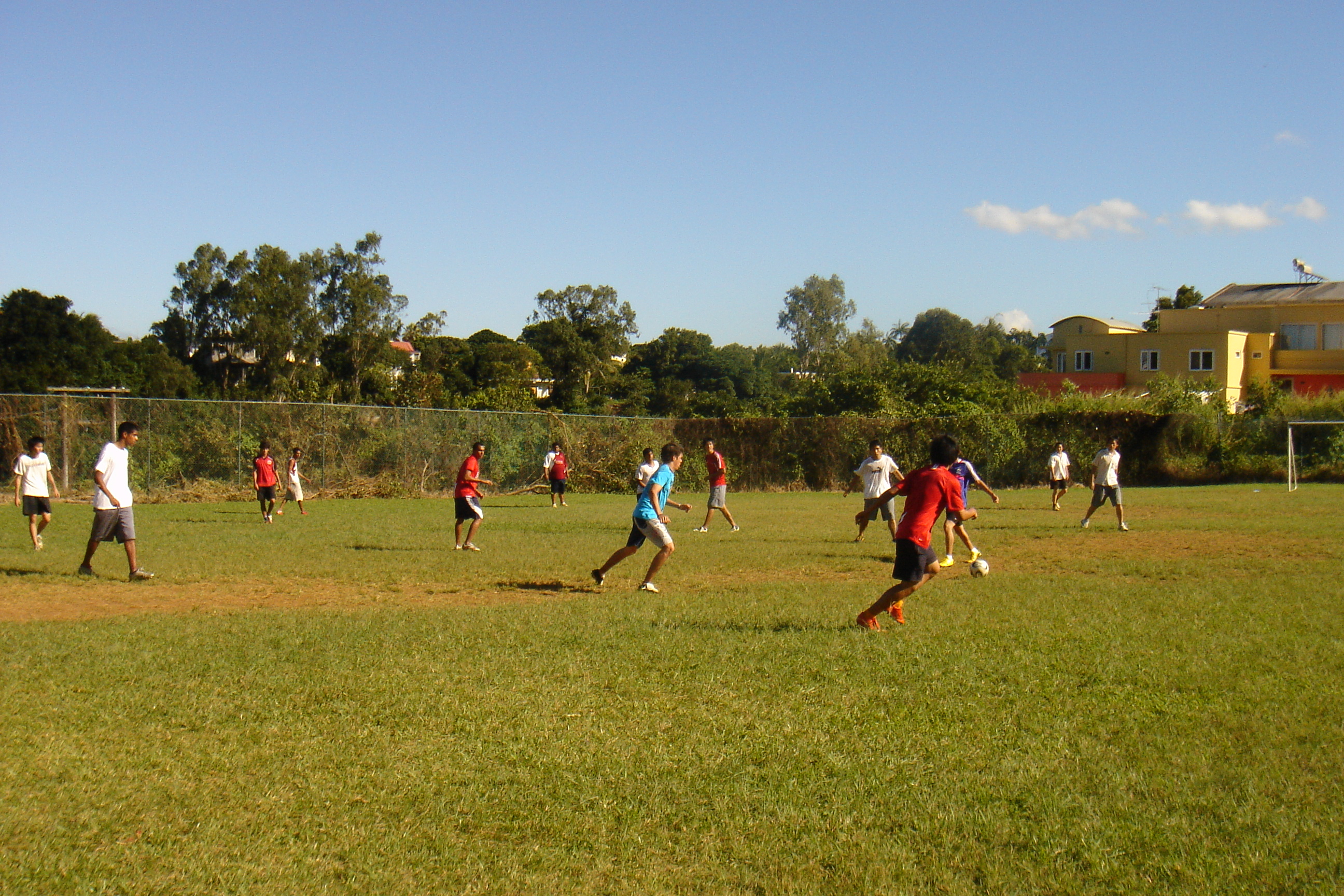
Le Bocage Football field (c.) 2009

== See also ==
- List of secondary schools in Mauritius
- Education in Mauritius
