= Quatre Bornes State Secondary School =

School in Quatre Bornes, Mauritius

Coordinates: 20.2653°S 57.4776°E

Quatre Bornes State Secondary School (QBSSS) is a government-operated secondary school in Quatre Bornes, Mauritius.

The school opened on the grounds of the Sodnac SSS in 2005. It moved to Belle Rose SSS and then to the former Strattford College facility in 2009. The permanent school building opened in 2010.
