= Rempart Mountain =

Mountain of Rivière Noire District, Mauritius

Rempart Mountain/Montagne kasé
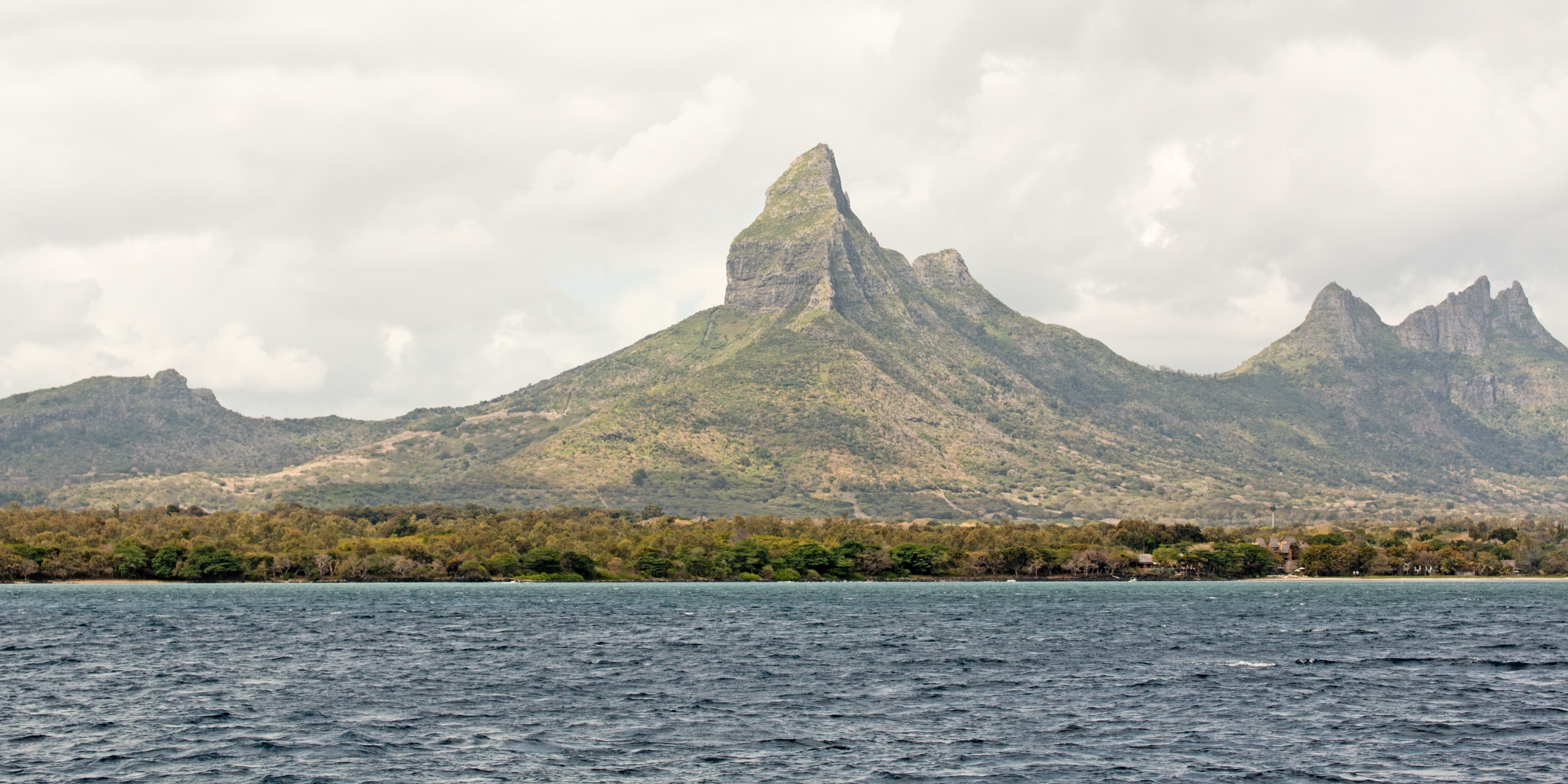
- Rempart Mountain as seen in 2015

Highest point
- Elevation: 772 m (2,533 ft)
- Coordinates: 20°18′11″S 57°25′50″E

Geography

Rempart Mountain is a mountain near Tamarin in the Rivière Noire District, western Mauritius. Rempart Mountain is the fourth-highest peak in Mauritius, after Le Pouce.

It is notable for its prominence, which is due to its three distinct peaks. The westernmost peak, known as Big Gorilla Peak or Fist Ridge, reaches a height of 772 metres (2,533 ft). The middle peak, Montagne Kasé, is slightly taller than the Trois Mamelles (Three Breasts), which stand at around 600 metres (2,000 ft). The easternmost peak, the original Rempart, is the shortest at 545 metres (1,788 ft).

The mountain itself is composed of weathered rock. It is considered a challenging climb. While a climbing ladder that once existed has been removed, the mountain remains on private property. Ascents require permission and are best undertaken with a guide. Despite these restrictions, trespassing for climbing purposes is not uncommon.

== See also ==
- Rivière du Rempart (river) in north-east Mauritius.
