= Sharur Turkish High School =

Former Azerbaijani high school

- Şərur Türk Liseyi
- Sharur; Azerbaijan

Information
- Type: Private High School
- Established: 1994
- Closed: 2014
- Language: English, Azerbaijani, Turkish

Sharur Turkish High School (Az: Şərur Türk Liseyi, also abbreviated as ŞTL) is a former privately owned boy's secondary/high school in Azerbaijan. It was founded in 1994 and was located in the city of Sharur, Nakhchivan Autonomous Republic of Azerbaijan. In its later years it was named after Ac. Ahmad Mahmudov (Az: Ak. Əhməd Mahmudov Adına Şərur Türk Liseyi). The school closed in 2014.

== Origin ==
Sharur Turkish High School was established by Zaman Educational Institution (tr:Zaman Eğitim-Öğretim Şirketi) in 1994 as one of three Nakhchivan Turkish High Schools. Zaman Educational Institution was established in 1992 as the first of a number of structured institutions to be established worldwide.

== Admissions and education ==
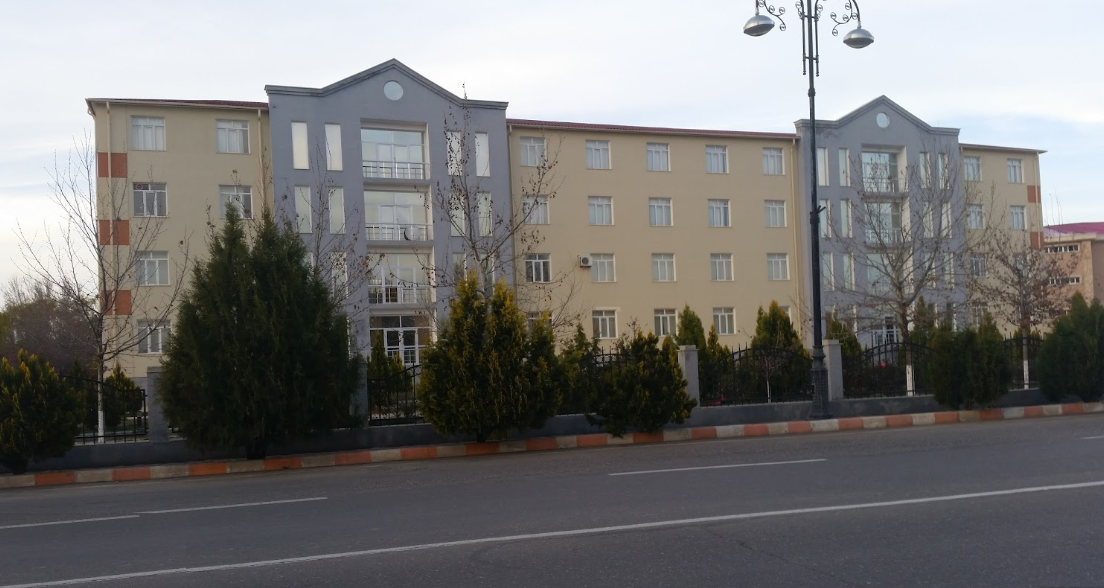
Sharur Turkish High School's main building

The admissions were taken from 6th grade students according to examination results. Education was in Azerbaijani, English, and Turkish. Accommodation and lunch were preferably provided by school. Achievements included numerous medals in international and nationwide olympiads and higher than 90% university acceptance rate, each year. Graduates continued their studies at universities worldwide, mostly in Turkey.

== Dissolution ==
The Zaman Educational Institution Schools including ŞTL produced their last graduates in 2014 and were shut down as a result of political debates in Turkey. In 2015 a bust of Ac. Ahmad Mahmudov in front of the defunct school's old building was disputatiously taken down for political issues which had wide media coverage.
