= Dr. Maurice Curé State College =

Location
- St Paul road, Vacoas. Mauritius
- Coordinates: 20.29724°S 57.49490°E

Information
- Type: Public, Academy
- Motto: Concordia Parvae Res Crescunt (In harmony, small things grow)
- Established: 1977; 49 years ago
- Website: http://dmcsc.edu.gov.mu/

The Dr Maurice Curé State College is a national secondary school in Mauritius, located in Vacoas. It is known for its annual high-rate achievement in the O-level and A-level Cambridge examinations certificate. It is recognised as one of the best secondary schools due to these exceptional annual results. Many students of the institution have been classed at national and international level in various different subjects.

The college is named after Maurice Curé.

== See also ==
- List of secondary schools in Mauritius
