= Dr. Regis Chaperon State Secondary School =

Dr Regis Chaperon State Secondary School

Location
- Royal Road, Belle-Rose; Quatre Bornes; Mauritius
- Coordinates: 20°14′54″S 57°28′54″E

Information
- Type: Public
- Established: 1978; 48 years ago
- Status: Currently constituted
- Head of school: Ms Parveez Ochotoya
- Staff: 85
- Teaching staff: 65
- Gender: Boys
- Enrollment: 1000
- Colours: White and grey
- Slogan: Knowledge for Life
- Mascot: Black jaguar
- Website: drcsss.edu.govmu.org

Dr Regis Chaperon State Secondary School (commonly known as Dr Regis Chaperon SSS and DRC) is an all-boys' state owned school in Quatre Bornes, Belle Rose, Mauritius. It serves nearly 1000 students annually. The school was built with the main purpose of free education and was the first high school to provide free schooling as from its inauguration in 1978.

== History ==
=== The Founder ===
Chaperon Louis Régis was born on the 20 July 1912. He attended the Royal College Curepipe and won the English scholarship in 1930. He went to the UK to study medicine at University College Hospital, qualified in 1937, and came back in 1939. He was nominated Minister of Education and Cultural Affairs in February 1974.

The plot of land on which the school was built was donated by Dr. Regis Chaperon. When it opened in 1978 the school catered for pupils up to form II only. The school had many scholarships winners during its existence before 2002 when it became a school with only school certificate students. In 2005 when the new government took over, it again became a Higher School Certificate School. However, with the introduction of free secondary education in 1976, and the growth in demand for secondary education, the government upgraded the school to admit students up to form V. H.S.C classes were introduced in 1988 and in 1999 the school produced its first laureate. In 1998, an Amnesty and Health Club was founded by the students.

The high school was for mixed students, admitting both boys and girls until the Gaëtan Raynal State College start to admit girls only. The school was the first secondary institution to offer free education as it was the first SSS (State Secondary School) to open its door.

=== Scholarship ===
The first student to win a scholarship at the Higher School Certificate was in 1998 in Economics and two scholarship winners in Science in 2002 and 2009.

=== Recently ===
The school has constructed a web site, and in 2000 launched the school magazine.

== See also ==
- Education in Mauritius
- List of secondary schools in Mauritius
