= Federation of Progressive Unions =

FPU
- Federation of Progressive Unions
- Headquarters: Rose-Hill, Mauritius
- Location: Mauritius
- Members: 35,000
- Key people: Rajesnarain Gutteea, general secretary
- Affiliations: ITUC

The Federation of Progressive Unions (FPU) is a national trade union center in Mauritius. It has a membership of 35,000 and is affiliated with the International Trade Union Confederation.
