= Sir Abdool Raman Osman State College =

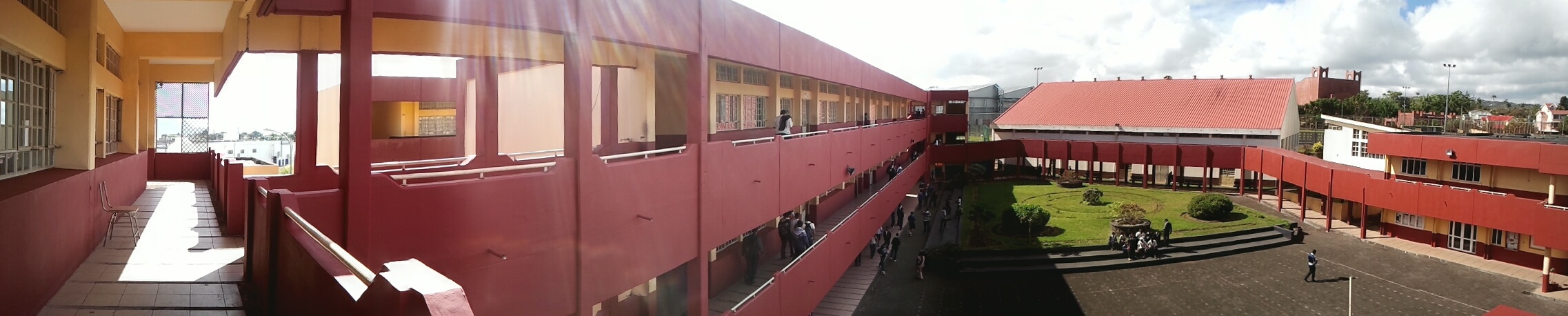
- 180° Panorama of school from second floor

Location
- Phoenix; Mauritius
- Coordinates: 20.282124°S 57.495596°E

Information
- Other name: SARO SC
- Former name: Sir Abdool Raman Osman State Secondary School
- Type: Academy, National college
- Motto: Latin: Sic Parvis Magna (Greatness from Small Beginnings)
- Established: 1996; 30 years ago
- Authority: Ministry of Education, Tertiary Education, Science and Technology
- Rector: A. Murad
- Grades: Grade 10 - Grade 13
- Gender: Mixed School
- Enrolment: 800 - 900
- Colours: Gold cream and navy
- Alumni: Sarosians/Sarosiens(Mauritian Creole)
- Website: saro.edu.gov.mu.org

Sir Abdool Raman Osman State College, abbreviated as SARO SC or simply SARO, is a public secondary school for boys and girls in Phoenix, Mauritius. It was found in 1996 as the Royal College of Phoenix and was renamed in late 1996 after Sir Abdool Raman Osman, the first Governor-General of Mauritius. The school became a National College in 2007.

SARO SC admits students having achieved excellent results in the National Certificate of Education (NCE) and preparing them for the University of Cambridge O Level and A Level.

== History ==
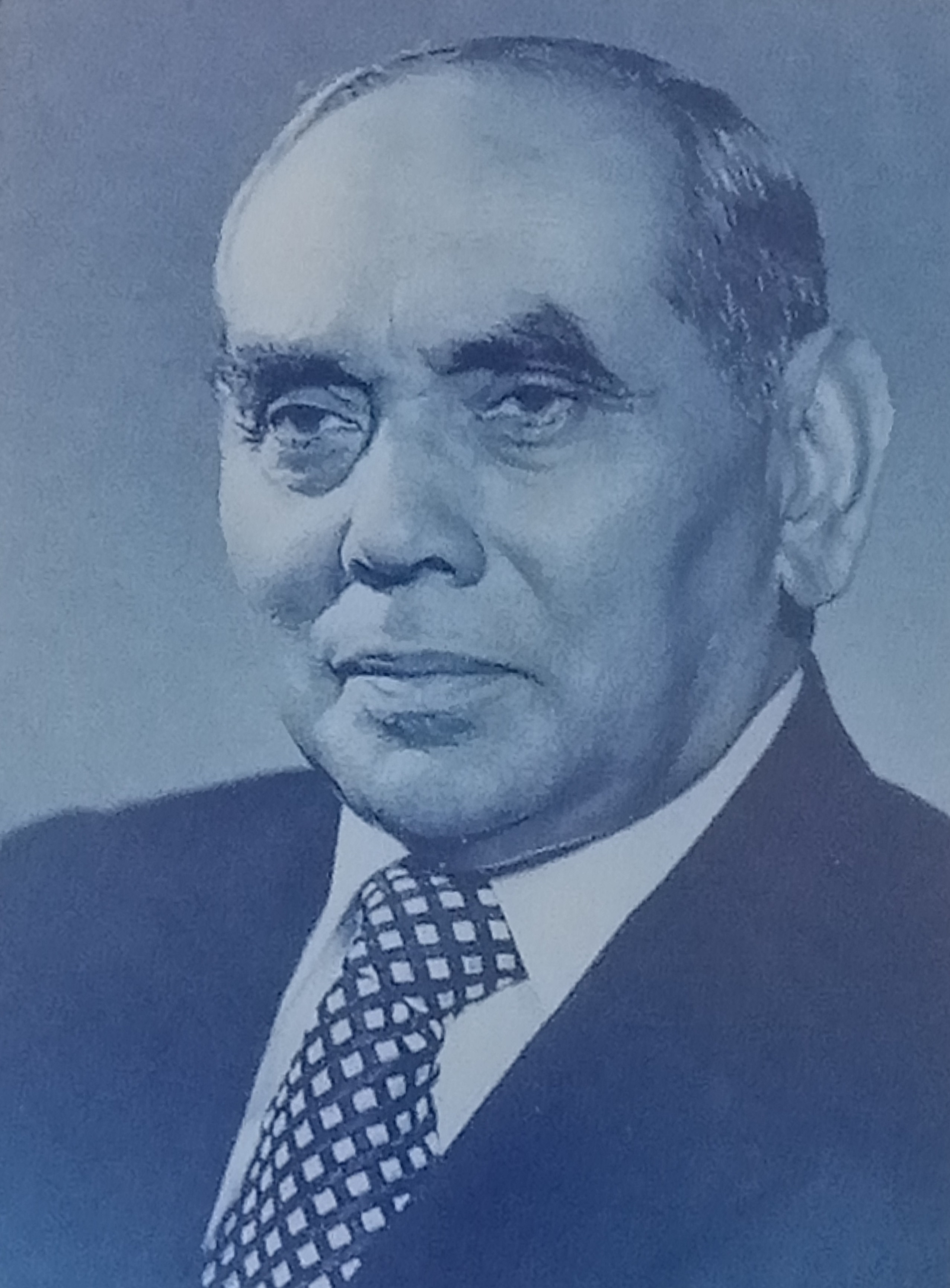
Sir Abdool Raman Osman, the school's namesake

The school welcomed its first students in 1996. Following that, more blocks were added and by the end of 1997, the school became a complex with a ground area of 1.6 hectares (4.0 acres). It was converted into a Form Six school in 2002.

In January 2006, consequent to a policy decision of the government, the school again started admitting pupils in Form 1.

End of year 2007, the school became a National College and changed its name from Sir Abdool Raman Osman State Secondary School to Sir Abdool Raman Osman State College.

In June 2021, the school was converted into an academy, meaning it will be only be teaching from Grade 10 to Grade 13. It welcomed 180 new students who performed well in the National Certificate of Education (NCE), including for the first time, 90 new girls.

== Infrastructural and sport facilities ==
- Laboratories: Physics (3), Chemistry (3), Biology (3), Integrated Sciences (2),
- Audio-Visual Room (0)
- Computer Rooms (3)
- Library (1)
- DC/DT Workshops (2)
- Basketball Grounds (1)
- Art Rooms (2)
- Volleyball/Badminton Courts (2)
- Gymnasium/Multipurpose Hall (1)
- Table Tennis Course (0)
- Lecture Theatre (1)
- Football Ground (0)
- Food Studies Lab (1)
- Textile Lab (1)

== See also ==
- Education in Mauritius
- List of secondary schools in Mauritius
