= Federation of Civil Service Unions =

Trade union in Mauritius

The Federation of Civil Service Unions (FCSU) is one of two main trade unions representing civil servants in Mauritius. The FCSU is affiliated to the National Trade Unions Confederation in Mauritius.

The FCSU was formed in 1956 and registered on 12 May 1957 with 21 government-sector affiliated unions.
