= Rabindranath Tagore Secondary School =

- Ilot; Mauritius

Information
- School type: Semi-public
- Motto: "Knowledge leads to immortality"
- Established: 2002; 24 years ago
- School board: Mahatma Gandhi Institute
- Rector: Mrs Kavita Bhuckory
- Grades: 7-13
- Gender: All
- Hours in school day: 6.5

Rabindranath Tagore Secondary School (RTSS) is a secondary school situated at Ilot, D'Épinay in the Pamplemousses district of Mauritius. It is widely regarded to be one of the most prestigious school in Mauritius and especially in the North of the country.

== History ==
In 2002, RTSS started to operate as a boys' only school.

RTSS started to accommodate girls to the school, to promote co-education.

Mr Mahendra Gungapersad was the first rector of the college from 2003 to 2014. He was then succeeded by Mrs K.Bhuckory who lead the school from 2015 to 2017.

Mr N.Joggesser then took over from 2018 to 2022 after which Mrs K.Bhuckory returned as the rector once again.(2022–Present).
