= Royal College Port Louis =

Location
- Cassis; Port Louis; Mauritius
- 20.16445°S 57.48571°E

Information
- School type: Public Academy
- Motto: Vitae Non Scholae Discendum (Learn for life, not for School)
- Established: 1791; 235 years ago
- School district: Port-Louis
- Rector: Mrs Ramsurrun(as of 2025)
- Grades: grade 10 to grade 13
- Gender: All
- Campus: design, food classrooms with sophisticated equipment available.
- Colours: White & Navy blue
- Slogan: "Nou Appel Sa Royal Port Louis, Pena Personne Ki Pou Arret Sa "
- Sports: Interkoltar & basketball
- Mascot: Lion
- Nickname: Blue kingdom
- Website: rcpl.edu.govmu.org
- Royal College Port Louis

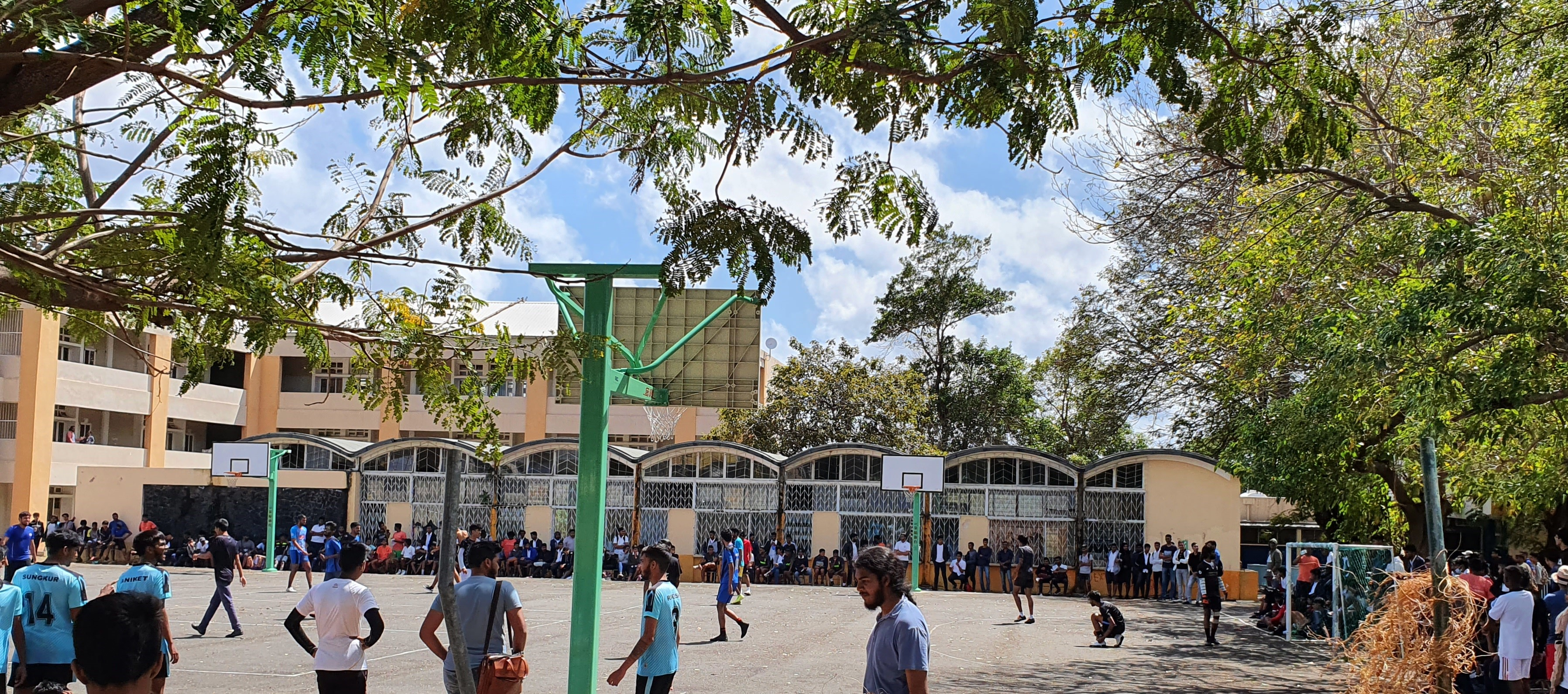
- The 2020 Interkoltar at RCPL

The Royal College Port Louis (RCPL) is an academy in Cassis, Mauritius. It is regarded as one of the most prestigious secondary schools in Mauritius concerning laureateship, education and morals, while carrying valuable historical importance. Originally founded in 1791 during the French colonial period, the first stone of the school's current building at Cassis was laid by Princess Margaret during her first visit to Mauritius in 1956.

In the past, it admitted boys having achieved excellent results at the Certificate of Primary Education (CPE) exams, based on national rankings. RCPL has a tradition of Higher School Certificate (HSC) laureates who compete for state scholarships for tertiary studies abroad.

The school promotes both physical and mental activities believing their students should and can venture in different paths whilst not diminishing creativity.

Following education system reforms and the introduction of nine-year schooling, RCPL was converted into an academy in 2021. Thus becoming a co-education institution admitting best performing male and female students of the National Certificate of Education.

Former RCPL boys can still be in contact with the school by registering themselves in the RCPLAA (royal college Port-Louis Alumni Association) where annual general meetings are held to vote for 20 executive members who helps in the school's development. Activities are held for the RCPL old boys to reunite them. There are 130 active RCPL alumni currently as of 2024.

== History ==
The creation of the college dates back to 1791 during the French colonisation period by Charles Isidor De Caen. The institution was then called "Lycée des Iles de France et de la Réunion", providing a primary and secondary education with a maximum capacity of 300 students.

In 1810, the island became an English colony, and the institution's name was changed to "Lycée Colonial". As the English took full possession of the island, it became important for them to have an English name for the institution. Thus, in 1817, the college was renamed "Royal College" following a decree from the King of England.

In 1824, the college's building was destroyed by a cyclone. Scholarships were briefly interrupted between 1827 and 1839. After that period, scholarships were reinstated and regularly given to student of each year. Until 1865, the exam boards were all run on the island itself.

In 1866, a malaria epidemic broke out in the capital Port-Louis and the college was converted into a hospital. The college was thus relocated to a different area of Port-Louis which was later deemed not reputable by officers whose children were also studying at the college. The increasing number of students was also a problem for the new college as space was limited. So, on 1 May 1899, the Legislative Council moved the Royal College from Port Louis to Curepipe.

On 1 October 1912, the foundation stone was laid in Curepipe by Director of Public Works Paul Le Juge de Segrais. The architecture was intended to be a smaller replica of the Buckingham Palace. Construction of the college in granite was completed by 1914. The new establishment was named Royal College School or simply La School. Due to the sheer number of pupils, the new branch also faced accommodation problems, leading to extension work.

As the island's population grew significantly and to reduce commuting times for students living in the northern part of Mauritius and Port Louis the government built a second and brand-new college at a location close to the capital. Thus, in 1956, during her visit to the island Princess Margaret laid the first stone for the new and ultimate building of Royal College Port Louis.

In 1970, the Royal College Port Louis swooped on all the 4 State Scholarships at stake on the boys' side (Also, that year, The Loreto College of Curepipe secured 1 scholarship and the other one was obtained by the Queen Elizabeth College.) In 1973, the Royal College Port Louis was honorably chosen to host the OCAMM Summit ('Organisation Commune Africaine, Malgache et Mauricienne'). 1979 marked the history of Royal College Port Louis as the school's 50th anniversary was celebrated with great pomp, with some of the highest dignitaries of the island, including the then Prime Minister. In December 1999, in the context of its 70th anniversary, the Royal College Port Louis was honoured with 'The Medal of the City of Port-Louis'. A grand ceremony took place at the Municipality to mark the occasion.

Later, in 2001, the school had the visit of the Manchester United Academy team. Two years later, Royal College Port Louis became a 'Form Six School' with no students admitted in Form 1. Yet, in 2005, the school underwent a change – Form 1 classes were reintroduced in Royal College Port Louis (and other 'star schools' such as Royal College Curepipe, Queen Elizabeth College, John Kennedy College). Thus, the school became a 'national college' and it was then in January 2007 that the first batch of Form 1 students after the reform were admitted.

In 2021, the school became a co-educational academy.

== Clubs ==
- Arts and Culture Club
- Business Club
- Code For RCPL (Supported by Code for Mauritius.)
- Debate Club
- Eco-Club
- Interact Club
- Maths & Science Club
- Sports & Wellness Club
- The Duke of Edinburgh Club
- Youth Leadership Club
- Arm wrestling Club

== Present day ==
Both Royal Colleges, Royal College Port-Louis and Royal College Curepipe share a common origin and students of the two institutions tend to consider each other as rivals. Both colleges' students are customarily called Royalists. Scholarships are attributed to the best pupils of the island for their high school certificate performances and the two institutions normally share a significant portion of the scholarships annually.

== See also ==
- List of secondary schools in Mauritius
- Education in Mauritius
