= Quatre Bornes =

Town in Mauritius

Quatre Bornes La Ville des Fleurs
- Town
- Quatre Bornes
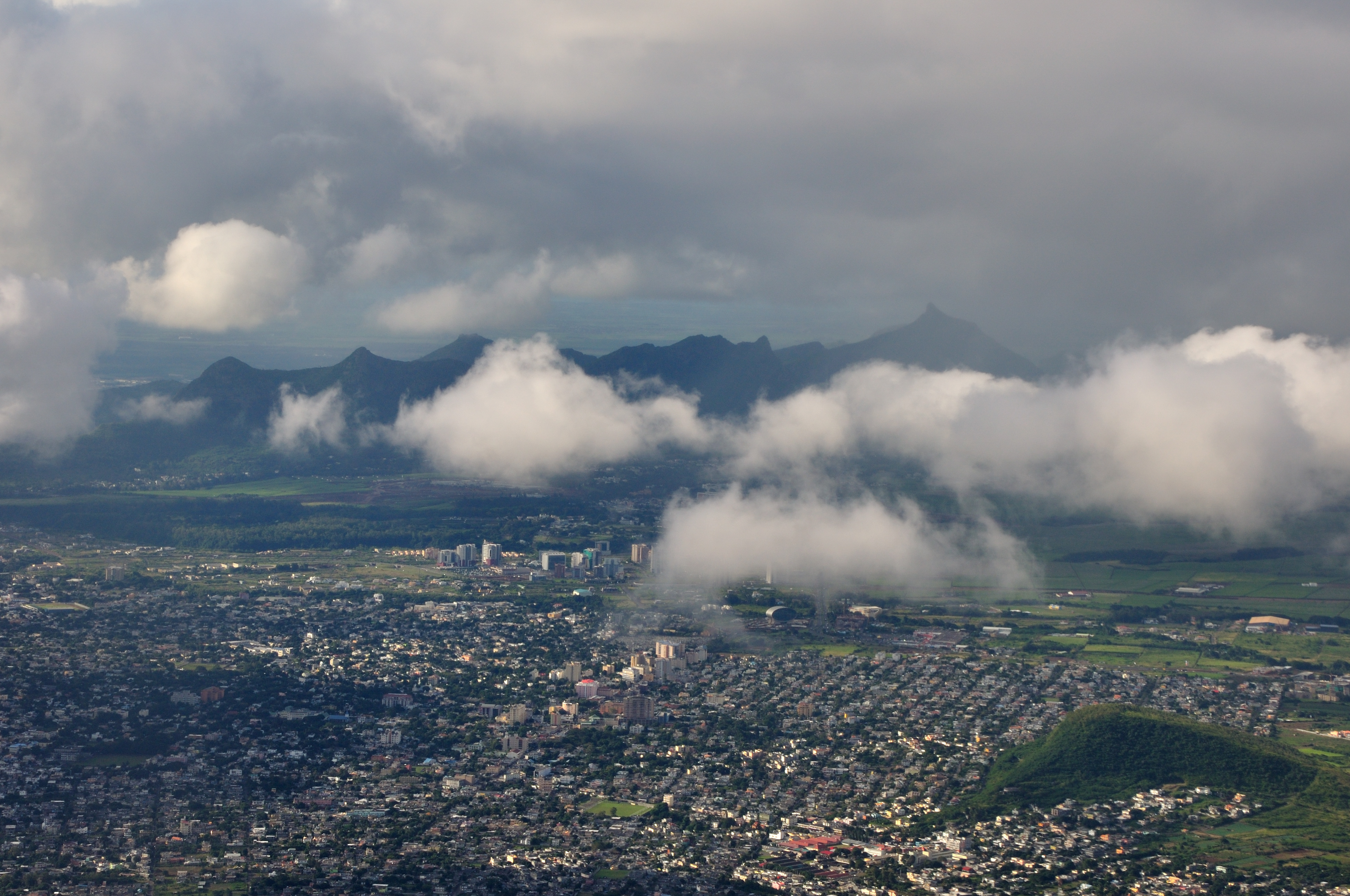
- Aerial view of Quatre Bornes in 2011

- Flag Seal
- Motto: "URBS - FLORIDA" (English for "Flowery")
- Municipal Council location
- Coordinates: 20°15′55.29″S 57°28′44.59″E
- Country: Mauritius
- District: Plaines Wilhems
- Settled: 1721

Government
  - Type: Municipality
  - Mayor: Mr. Ruddy Kennoo
  - Deputy Mayor: Mr. Jameel Foondun

Area
  - Total: 25.45 km^{2} (9.83 sq mi)
- Elevation: 313 m (1,027 ft)

Population (2022)
  - Total: 71,076
  - Rank: 5th in Mauritius
  - Density: 3,333.8/km^{2} (8,635/sq mi)
- Time zone: UTC+4 (MUT)
- Post Code: 72249
- Airport: Plaisance Airport (distanced approximately 29 km)
- Climate: Am
- Website: Municipal Council Website

Quatre Bornes (Mauritian Creole pronunciation: [katʁe boːn]), also known as La Ville des Fleurs (The City of Flowers), is a town in Mauritius, located mainly in the Plaines Wilhems District. Its western part lies in the Rivière Noire District. The town is administered by the Municipal Council of Quatre Bornes. Situated between the towns of Beau-Bassin Rose-Hill and Vacoas-Phoenix, Quatre Bornes is linked by roads to the north, east, south and west of Mauritius. According to the census made by Statistics Mauritius in 2022, the population of the town was at 71,076.

== History ==
In 1721, Wilhem Leicknig of Prussian origin settled on the island then known as Isle de France, the district of Plaines Wilhems was named after him. In 1740, French cartographer Guyomar drew the "Quartiers des Plaines Wilhems" where Quatre Bornes was shown as a forest which was slowly being colonised. Joseph François Charpentier de Cossigny named his region Palma and Governor Antoine Desforges Boucher named his region Bassin in 1764. During the British period, the railway line was introduced in 1864, the region of Plaines-Wilhems started developed rapidly with the migration of people from coastal regions. Quatre Bornes was proclaimed a village in 1890, then proclaimed "Town" under Governor Harman in 1896. The Bassin and Palma state was annexed to the Town of Quatre Bornes in 1967. In 1987, the region of La source was annexed to the town of Quatre Bornes. In the 1980s and 1990s, a period of rapid commercial development started.

== Politics ==
For the general elections the town is classified within the Constituency No.18 Belle Rose and Quatre Bornes. For several past general elections the Nomination Centre has been located within Baichoo Madhoo Government School.

The Municipal Town Council of Quatre Bornes has 20 members. The town has five wards, each returning four councillors. During the 2025 municipal elections, Alliance du Changement won all council seats. Following the election, the council elected Labour Party members Ruddy Bryan Kennoo as mayor and Jameel Foondun as deputy mayor.

== Education ==
Schools in Quatre Bornes include 12 secondary schools and 9 primary schools which are either state owned or private institutions.

Secondary institutions include the College Sainte-Marie, Collège du Saint-Esprit, Dr. Regis Chaperon State Secondary School, Eden College Boys, Eden College Girls, Gaëtan Raynal State College, Islamic Cultural College, Loreto College Quatre Bornes, Palma State Secondary School, Patten College Boys, Quatre Bornes State Secondary School and Sodnac State Secondary School.

Primary schools include Baichoo Madhoo Government School, Emilienne Rochecouste Government School (GS), Beau Séjour GS, Candos GS, Louis Nellan GS, Palma GS, Remy Ollier GS, Chooroomoney GS, Sir Veerasamy Ringadoo GS and Sookun Gaya GS.

== Sports ==
The town is home to the Guy Rozemont Football Stadium, the team of the town is the AS Quatre Bornes.

== Suburbs ==
The town of Quatre Bornes is divided into different regions.

- Bassin
- Belle Rose
- Berthaud
- Candos
- Centre Ville
- Ébène
- Bassin
- La Louise
- Residence Kennedy
- La Source
- Palma
- Pellegrin
- Pierrefonds
- Sodnac
- St Jean
- Trianon
- Vieux Quatre Bornes

== Twin towns – sister cities ==
Quatre Bornes is twinned with:

- Ambalavao, Madagascar
- Daqing, China
- Saint-Benoît, Réunion, France

== See also ==
- List of places in Mauritius
