= Rivière du Rempart (river) =

River in Mauritius

Coordinates: 20.092°S 57.704°E

The Rivière du Rempart is a river in northeast Mauritius. It is the outflow of La Nicolière, a lake in the central north of Mauritius. It then flows northeast to reach the Indian Ocean north of Poste de Flacq. The river gives its name to the Rivière du Rempart District.

There is also another Rivière du Rempart in the district of Black River, close to the entrance of Tamarin.

== See also ==
- Rempart Mountain
