= Eden College (Mauritius) =

Location
- Ollier Avenue (Boys dept); Royal Road, Belle Rose (Girls dept); Quatre Bornes, Mauritius
- 20.247703°S 57.478997°E

Information
- School type: Publicly Funded, Private Secondary School
- Motto: Let Knowledge Grow
- Founded: 1951
- School district: Plaines Wilhems
- Rector: Mr N. Henrage
- Classes offered: Grade 7 - Grade 13
- Language: English, French, Mauritian Creole
- Colour

Eden College is a private secondary school located in Quatre Bornes, Mauritius. Students are prepared for the School Certificate (O Level) and the Higher School Certificate (A Level).

== See also ==
- List of secondary schools in Mauritius
- Education in Mauritius
