= Rose-Belle =

- Town
- Municipal Council location
- Coordinates: 20°24′9″S 57°36′22″E
- Country: Mauritius
- Districts: Grand Port

Government
  - Type: Municipality
- Elevation: 270 m (890 ft)

Population (2021)
  - Total: 12,799
- Time zone: UTC+4 (MUT)
- ISO 3166 code: MU-CU
- Climate: Af
- Website: Municipal Council

Rose-Belle is a small town in southeastern Mauritius.

== Location ==
It is located in the Grand Port district, ten kilometers west of the district's well known town of Mahébourg. The population of the town in 2021 was 12,799. Of the 20 cities in Mauritius, Rose Belle ranks 15th in terms of population.
