= List of Mauritians =

The following list of Mauritians (in alphabetical order by last name), who are notable and are either born in Mauritius, of Mauritian descent or who produce works that are primarily about Mauritius.

== Politicians and political figures ==
- Emmanuel Anquetil (1885–1946), political activist and one of the founders of Labour Party
- Anil Bachoo, former minister
- Sheilabai Bappoo (1947–), former minister
- Rashid Beebeejaun (1935–), former Deputy Prime Minister
- Monique Ohsan Bellepeau, Vice President
- Paul Raymond Bérenger (1945–), former Prime Minister
- Roshi Bhadain, former minister
- Heeralall Bhugaloo (1938–2021), former minister
- Basdeo Bissoondoyal (1906–1991), activist, social worker, educator and founder of Jan Andolan
- Sookdeo Bissoondoyal (1908–1977), politician, founder of Independent Forward Bloc
- Harish Boodhoo (1941–), former Deputy Prime Minister and founder of Parti Socialiste Mauricien
- Arvin Boolell, leader of opposition, former minister
- Satcam Boolell, former deputy Prime Minister and High Commissioner in London
- Satyajit Boolell, former Director of Public Prosecutions
- Lormesh Bundhoo, general secretary of the Labour Party
- Raouf Bundhun (1937–), former Vice President
- Dayendranath Burrenchobay, former Governor General
- Angidi Chettiar (1928–2010), former Vice President
- Dorine Chukowry (1974–), minister of commerce, and former Lord Mayor of Port Louis
- Serge Clair (1940–), former leader of Rodrigues
- Maurice Curé (1886–1977), political activist and one of the founders of Labour Party
- Atma Doolooa (1952–2013), politician and author
- Gaëtan Duval (1930–1996), former vice Prime Minister, leader of PMSD and Parti Gaetan Duval
- Charles Gaetan Xavier-Luc Duval (1958–), former vice Prime Minister, leader of PMXD and PMSD
- Louis Joseph Coralie (1912–1967), politician
- Jaya Krishna Cuttaree (1941–2018), diplomat, former minister
- Madun Dulloo, diplomat, former minister
- Sangeet Fowdar (1957–), former minister
- Rabindranath Ghurburrun (1928–2008), former Vice President
- Victor Glover (1932–2020), former Chief Justice
- Hurrylall Goburdhun (1919–2019), former judge, director of Rose Hill Transport and member of Margo Commission
- Ramchundur Goburdhun (1911–1992), Indian former diplomat, ICC chairman, Indian ambassador to Algeria and Turkey
- Kher Jagatsingh (1931–1985), former minister
- Kailesh Jagutpal, minister
- Aziza Mint Jiddou, Member of Parliament
- Anerood Jugnauth (1930–2021), former Prime Minister and President
- Pravind Jugnauth (1961–), Prime Minister and former Vice Prime Minister, leader of the MSM
- Eugène Laurent (1850–1926), former mayor of Port Louis and one of the founders of Action Libérale
- Vishnu Lutchmeenaraidoo (1944–), former Vice Prime Minister of Mauritius
- Amédée Maingard (1918–1981), war hero and founder of Air Mauritius
- Amal mint Maouloud, engineer and politician of the Equity Party (Mauritania); CEO of Mauritania Airlines
- Cassam Moollan, Chief Justice and acting Governor General (1985–1986)
- Abdool Razack Mohamed (1906–1978), politician and founder of Comité d'Action Musulman
- Shakeel Mohamed, former minister
- Yousuf Mohamed (1933–2022), former minister
- Prem Nababsing (1940–2017), former Vice Prime Minister
- Virgile Naz (1825–1901), former politician
- Karl Offmann (1940–), former President
- Raman Osman, former Governors-General
- Pramila Patten (1958–), Under-Secretary-General of the United Nations
- Ariranga Pillay, former chief justice
- Radha Padayachee-Poonoosamy (1924–2008), first female cabinet minister
- Navin Ramgoolam (1947–), ex-Prime Minister, leader of the Labour Party (Mauritius)
- Seewoosagur Ramgoolam (1900–1985), first Prime Minister and former Governor-General
- Lutchmeeparsadsing Ramsahok (1948–2017), former trade unionist and minister.
- Veerasamy Ringadoo (1920–2000), first President
- Emilienne Rochecouste, first female elected member of Legislative Council
- Prithvirajsing Roopun (1959–), President
- Guy Rozemont (1915–1956), former trade unionist and leader of the Labour Party
- Kailash Ruhee, former diplomat and former minister
- Renganaden Seeneevassen (1910–1958), former minister
- Rama Sithanen (1954–), former Vice Prime Minister
- Harry Tirvengadum (1933–), former head of Air Mauritius and central figure of Caisse Noire Affair
- Cassam Uteem (1941–), former President

== Scientists and technologists ==
- Jean Marie Bosser (1922–2013), botanist
- Charles-Édouard Brown-Séquard (1817–1894), neurologist, physiologist
- France Staub (1920–2005), ornithologist and conservationist
- Joël de Rosnay (1937–), futurist, molecular biologist
- Julien François Desjardins (1799–1840), zoologist
- Joseph Désiré Tholozan (1820–1897), epidemiologist
- Dr Louis Gaston Labat (1876-1934), pioneering regional anesthesiologist

== Philanthropists and social activists ==
- Shirin Aumeeruddy-Cziffra (born 1948), British-born human rights activist
- Suzanne Leclézio (1898–1987), Mauritius-born French resistance fighter, nurse, and railway social worker

== Religious figures ==
- Jacques-Désiré Laval (1803–1864), French Roman Catholic missionary in Mauritius
- Caroline Lenferna de Laresle (1824–1900), nun who founded a Mauritius congregation
- Basdeo Bissoondoyal (1906–1991) social worker
- Jean Margéot (1916–2009), Catholic clergyman
- Maurice Piat (1941–), Roman Catholic cardinal
- Rajendra Arun (1945–2021), Indian academic
- Mahadeosingh 'Visham' Komalram (1978–), also known as Vishwananda, Mauritian neo-Hindu religious leader

== Poets ==
- Édouard Maunick (1931–2021)
- Joseph Tsang Mang Kin (1938–2024) poet, political scientist and biographer

== Entertainment ==
=== Actresses ===
- Viveka Babajee (1973–2010), model and actress
- Françoise Pascal, actress, singer, dancer, fashion model, and producer
- Hazel Keech, British−Mauritian model

=== Comedians ===
- Miselaine Duval, comedian, television producer and writer
- Vince Duvergé (1995–) stand-up comedian, actor, filmmaker

=== Choreographers ===
- Sanedhip Bhimjee

=== Fashion designers ===
- Yuvna Kim (1984–), Mauritian-born British fashion designer, model, and TV journalist

=== Film directors ===
- David Constantin (1974–) filmmaker
- Vincent Toi, Mauritian-Canadian film director

=== Models and Miss Mauritius ===
- Ameeksha Dilchand (1988–) Miss Mauritius 2012
- Diya Beeltah (1988–) model
- Laetitia Darche (1991–) Belgian-born Mauritian model
- Nathalie Lesage
- Viveka Babajee
- Pallavi Gungaram
- Urvashi Gooriah (1999–)
- Bessika Bucktawor (1995–)
- Hazel Keech (1987–), British−Mauritian model

=== Musicians and singers ===
- Angry Anderson (1947–2026) rock singer, songwriter, television personality, and actor
- DJ Assad (1982–) Mauritian-French DJ and record producer
- Kaya (1960–1999) singer, creator of "seggae" a fusion of Mauritian sega and reggae music
- Menwar (1955–) percussionist and singer
- Havana Brown (born Angelique Meunier; 1985–), Australian DJ, recording artist and dancer, she has Mauritian parents of French descent
- Mélanie René (1990–) Swiss singer and songwriter

=== Radio ===
- Yanish Engutsamy, radio jockey, presenter

== Sports ==
- Kim Le Court (1996–), professional road cyclist, first African woman to lead the Tour de France Femmes, winner of 2026 Tour of Britain
- Shanawaz Allyboccus (1984–), retired footballer who played for the national team
- Benoit Bouchet, first windsurfer to sail between Mauritius and Réunion Island unassisted
- Jonathan Bru (1985–), French-born professional footballer who plays for Portuguese club U.D. Oliveirense and the Mauritius national team
- Kévin Bru (1988–), French-born professional footballer who plays for English Championship side Ipswich Town and the Mauritius national team
- Stéphan Buckland (1977–), retired track and field athlete who competed in the 100m and 200m
- Ned Charles, Mauritian-born (Mahebourg) former footballer who played at both professional and international levels as an attacker. First Mauritian to play professionally in Europe.
- Richarno Colin, boxer best known for winning the Light Welterweight gold medal at the 2011 All-Africa Games.
- Sylvain Content, retired footballer who played for the national team
- Ranini Cundasawmy, first female to win the gold medal at a Muay Thai World Championship. The championship was held in March 2017 in Bangkok, Thailand.
- Steeve Curpanen, retired footballer who played for the national team
- Vikash Dhorasoo, French-born former footballer who played at both professional and international levels as a midfielder.
- Bruno Julie, bantamweight boxer who won a number of medals in international tournaments and competed in the 2008 Olympics.
- Annabelle Lascar, participated in the 2008 and 2012 Summer Olympics
- Corinne Leclair, swimmer who participated in the 1992 Summer Olympics
- Veronique Marrier D'Unienville archery, participated in the 2008 Summer Olympics
- Eric Milazar, national athletics record holder in the 400m, the 300m, the 200m indoor and the 400m indoor
- Ram Ruhee, founder of Cadets Club (1948) & member of the International Olympic Committee (1988-2007)
- Pascal Wehrlein, German-born Formula One driver currently driving for Sauber, driver for Manor in 2016 and Mercedes F1 Team protégé.

== Business ==
- Ajum Goolam Hossen 1850–1919), international pepper and sugar trader
- Amode Ibrahim Atchia (1868–1947), hydroelectric entrepreneur and technologist
- Jean-Raymond Boulle, diamond and mineral magnate, international conservationist
- Sunil Benimadhu, economist and CEO of the Stock Exchange of Mauritius
