= List of Mauritian models =

This is a list of notable Mauritian models.

== Female models ==
- Danika Atchia
- Viveka Babajee
- Diya Beeltah
- Laetitia Darche
- Ameeksha Dilchand
- Hazel Keech
- Nathalie Lesage
- Urvashi Gooriah

== See also ==
- List of Mauritians
