= Vince Duvergé =

Mauritian Comedian

- Born: January 15, 1995 (age 31)
- Education: Lycée La Bourdonnais; SAE Institute

Joseph Guy Vincent Duvergé (Vince Duvergé) (born 15 January 1995) is a Mauritian actor, filmmaker, stand-up and web comedian.

== Biography ==
Born in Mauritius in 1995, Duvergé became the number one Mauritian YouTube comedian in 2013.

Vince Duvergé made his comedy debut in 2011, during the Mauritian comedy festival "Festival du Rire de Komiko" during which he played in the stage play "Complètement Toc-Toc" and also performed his own stand-up comedy segment.

In 2012, Duvergé created a YouTube channel where he regularly posted comedy clips that he produced with his best friends Yann Charlotte and David André. The channel encountered its first big success after Duverge released a parody about Miss Mauritius in which he controversially portrayed the 2013 Miss Mauritius, Pallavi Gungaram who had, back then, given an unfortunate interview.

In 2013, Vince joins the Mauritius Broadcasting Corporation (MBC) as a radio host. He then created a humoristic radio show which was aired every Friday evening on MusicFM.

In January 2014, Vince Duvergé flies to Sydney (Australia) to study cinematography. During his studies he was awarded at the Kogarah Film Festival with Best Actor, Best Script and Best Film awards.

In 2015, along with his classmates, Duvergé went on to develop a web series concept called "Undergrads". Largely based on his own life, the series tells the story of a foreign student arriving in Sydney only to become a victim of humorous unlucky events while trying to get used to his new Australian life.

By mid 2016, Vince accepted to head back to Mauritius in order to develop new projects in the radio industry and in comedy. He joined the MBC once again in order to create a new drive time concept for the same station he used to work for years earlier: MusicFM. Duvergé decided to form a duo along with Ursula Lareine, another host of the station. This led to the creation of The Drive Show.

== Awards ==
Year	Organisation	Award	Work	Result	Ref
2014	Short Stuff Film Festival of Kogarah (Australia)	Best Film	"A Day With Godfrey"	Won	
2014	Short Stuff Film Festival of Kogarah (Australia)	Best Actor	"A Day With Godfrey"	Won	
2014	Short Stuff Film Festival of Kogarah (Australia)	Best Script	"A Day With Godfrey"	Won	
