= Bessika Bucktawor =

Mauritian beauty pageant titleholder born 1995

- Born: April 28, 1995 (age 31); Port Louis, Mauritius
- Height: 1.68 m (5 ft 6 in)
- Beauty pageant titleholder
- Title: Miss Mauritius 2016
- Hair color: Dark brown
- Eye color: Black
- Major competition: Miss Mauritius 2016

Bessika Bucktawor (born April 28, 1995) is a Mauritian beauty pageant titleholder who was crowned Miss Mauritius 2016.

== Miss Mauritius Competition 2016 ==
Year	Competition	Status	Notes
2016	Miss Mauritius	Won	
2016	Miss Mauritius Elegance	Won	
