= Radha Poonoosamy =

Radha Poonoosamy GOSK

Minister of Women's Affairs, Prices and Consumer Protection
- In office 10 June 1975 – 27 December 1976
- Prime Minister: Seewoosagur Ramgoolam
- Preceded by: Office established
- Succeeded by: Shirin Aumeeruddy-Cziffra (Women's Rights and Family Welfare) (Note: Portfolio vacant until 1982.); Simadree Virahsawmy (Prices and Consumer Protection)

Member of Parliament; for Port Louis North and Montagne Longue
- In office 1975 – 21 October 1976
- Preceded by: Mohabeer Foogooa
- Succeeded by: Suresh Moorba

Personal details
- Born: 18 September 1924 Durban, South Africa
- Died: 15 January 2008 (aged 83) Durban, South Africa
- Party: Labour Party
- Spouse: Valaydon Poonoosamy

Radhamaney Poonoosamy GOSK (Tamil: ராதா பொன்னுசாமி படையாச்சி) (née Padayachee; 18 September 1924 – 15 January 2008), was a Mauritian politician and feminist activist.

She was the first female minister in Mauritius, being appointed as minister of Women's Affairs, Prices and Consumer Protection under the government of Sir Seewoosagur Ramgoolam. Poonoosamy had made history before in 1969 by becoming the first deputy mayor appointed in Mauritian local government.

== Early life and education ==
Radha Padayachee was born into a family of Indian origin in Durban, South Africa. Growing up, she faced an increasingly restrictive set of racial segregation laws that framed her early comprehension of social injustice. Her parents encouraged her to pursue higher education, and she eventually attended the University of Natal, where campus discussions on civil rights and discrimination provided an opportunity for her to increase her awareness.

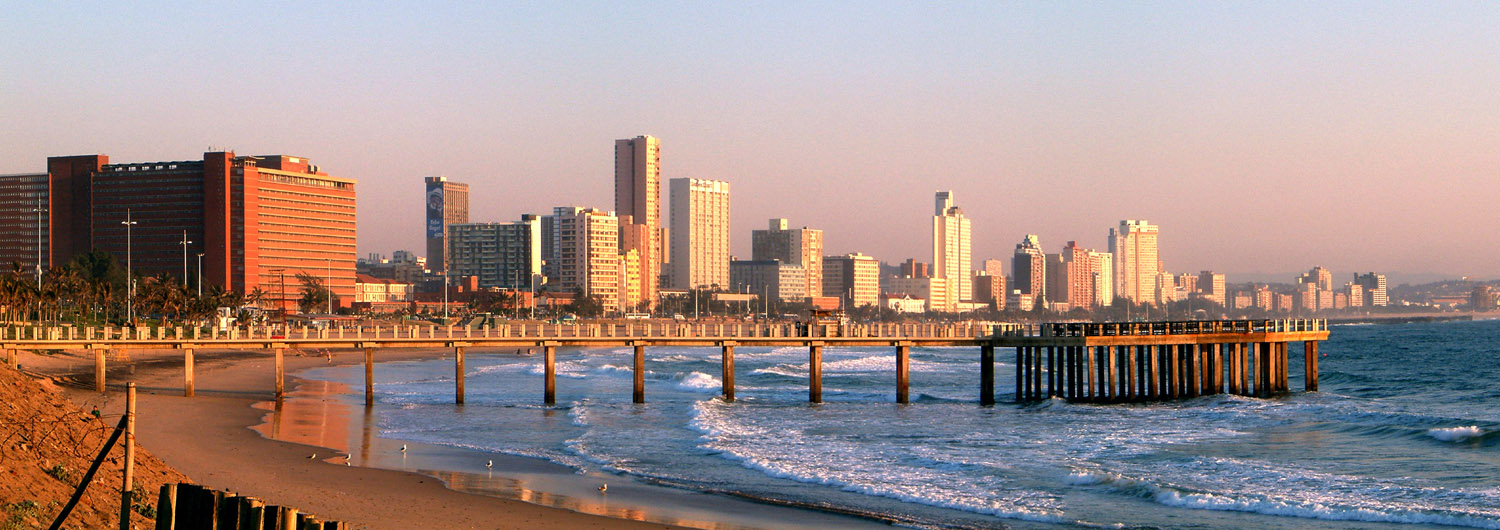
Skyline of Durban, South Africa, where Radha Poonoosamy was born.

At the university, she became engaged with student groups affiliated with the South African Indian Congress, participating in discussions about women's rights, education, and the burgeoning movement for racial equality. These experiences played an important role in shaping her political awareness and interest in civic participation. She did not yet envision a political career for herself, but the ideas she encountered during these years later informed her work in Mauritius.

== Move to Mauritius and early political involvement ==
She migrated to Mauritius

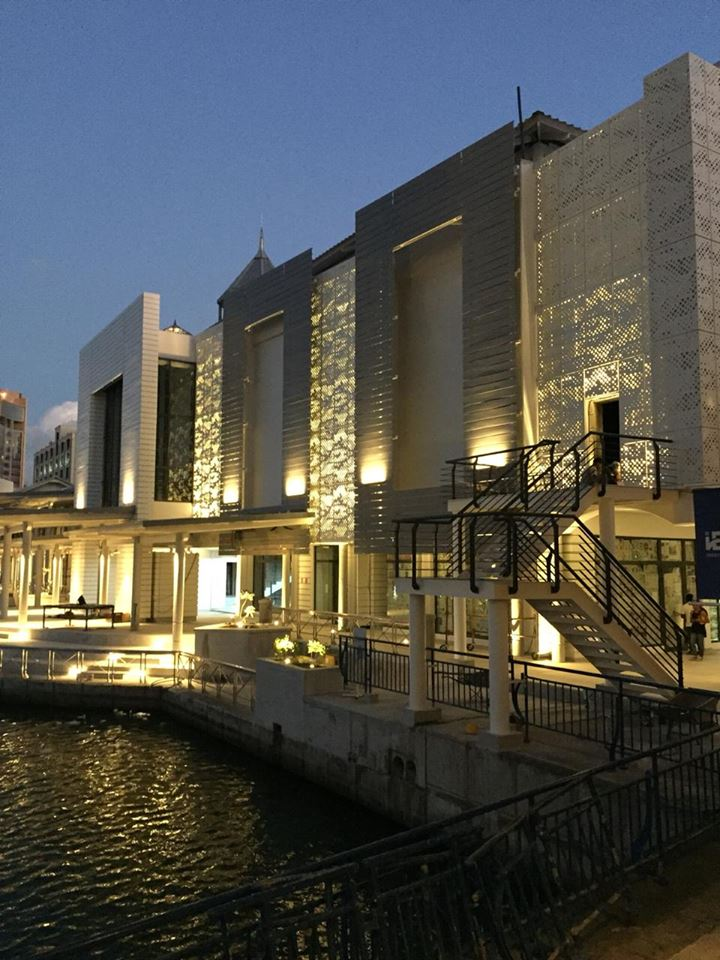
Port Louis, the capital of Mauritius.

in the early 1950s, following her marriage with Dr. Valaydon Poonoosamy. At the time, major political reforms were sweeping through Mauritius, resulting in widened franchise and the gradual development of mass political participation. The island was heading toward independence, with political parties building wider support across different communities.

She joined the Mauritius Labour Party and became one of the women who contributed to strengthening the party's structures at the community level. Her early activities included organizing meetings, discussing social problems with women voters, and explaining civic responsibilities in a changing political environment. Her work contributed to increasing women's participation in public life when their involvement had been relatively limited. Her efforts also reflected the broader movements in Mauritius aimed at expanding access to education and encouraging participation in the political process.

== Municipal career ==
In 1969, Poonoosamy became the first woman to be elected as Deputy Mayor of Quatre Bornes. This was a significant landmark at a time when most elected municipal officers in Mauritius were men. Her work ranged from community development, public services, and welfare programs in cooperation with the local councils. She was particularly known for her interaction with families, schools, and community groups to understand their concerns and help guide improvements in local administration.

Her presence within the municipal government marked a change in expectations regarding women in leadership positions. Many observers noted that her election encouraged other women to consider standing for local office. Her tenure also offered a model for the involvement of women in municipal politics, which continued to grow over the years thereafter.

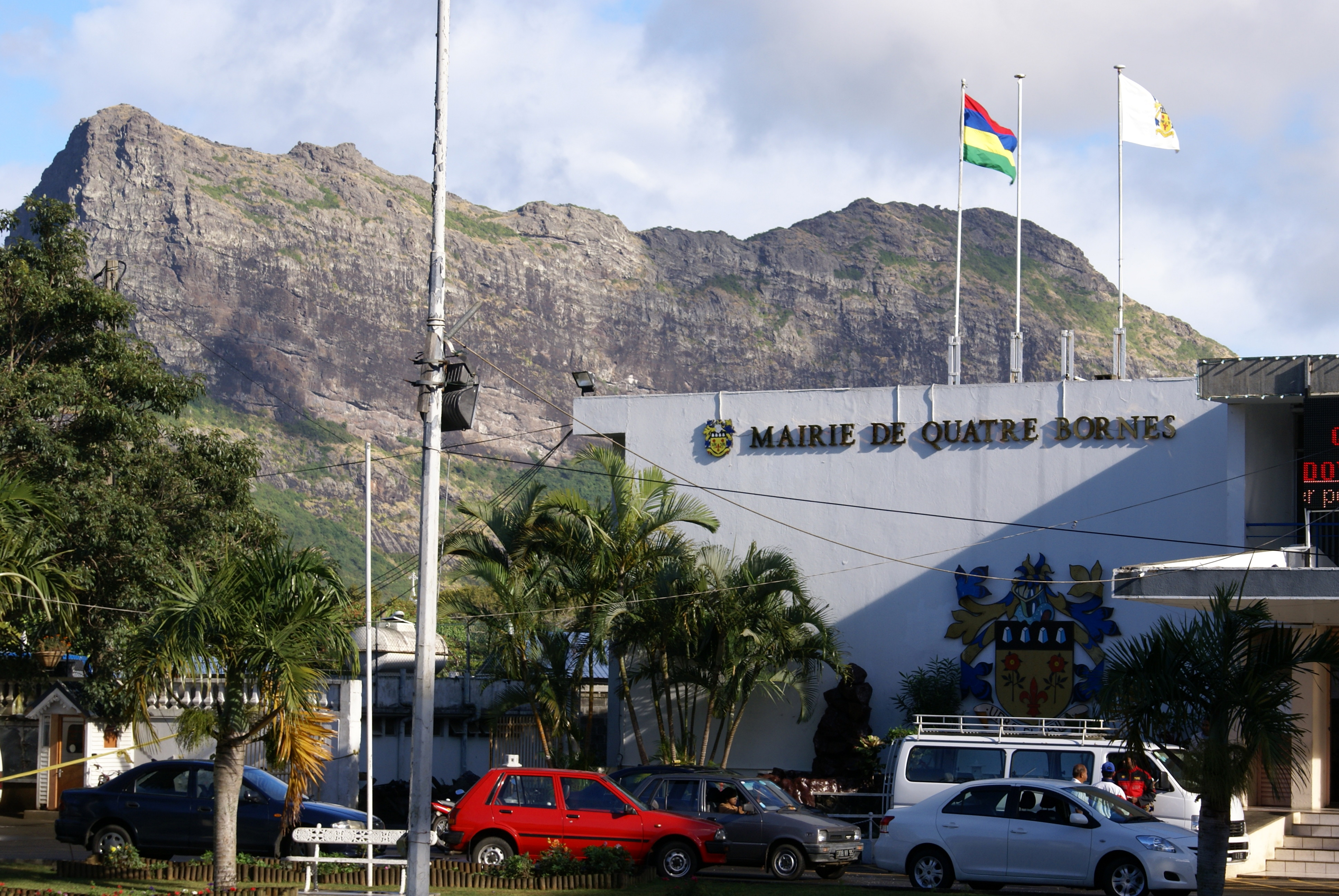
Municipal Council building in Quatre Bornes, where Poonoosamy served as Deputy Mayor.

== National political career ==
Poonoosamy first gained national prominence in 1975, when she was made Minister of Women's Affairs, Prices, and Consumer Protection, becoming the first woman to be a Cabinet minister in Mauritius. She was appointed in a period of national change, when Mauritius was establishing new institutions and shaping its social policy in the post-independence era.

Her ministry was responsible for consumer rights, cost-of-living concerns, and policies regarding women and families. While in office, she represented Mauritius at the World Conference on Women, 1975 held in Mexico City. There, representatives from around the world came together to share strategies on reducing discrimination and increasing access to education, jobs, and social equality. In this way, her involvement connected Mauritius with the international discussion on women's rights and underscored increased attention given to gender issues in national policy.

Although her ministerial tenure was not long, it played an important symbolic and practical role in demonstrating that women could hold senior positions in government and influence public policy. Her work helped change perceptions of women in leadership roles during an important juncture in Mauritian political history.

== Political career ==
After she moved to Mauritius in 1952, Poonoosamy continued her activism there within the Mauritius Labour Party. She ran as a candidate of the Labour Party under the banner of the Independence Party for the general election held in 1967. Poonoosamy ran for the constituency of Belle Rose and Quatre Bornes, but failed to be elected and placed fifth overall. The entire constituency was won by the Parti Mauricien Social Démocrate. She was the only female candidate fielded in the general election.

Poonoosamy made history by becoming the first woman elected to become deputy mayor of Quatre Bornes on 15 April 1969.

In 1975, Poonoosamy was elected a Member of Parliament following the death of Mohabeer Foogooa. Because by-elections were abolished at that time since 1970, Poonoosamy was chosen by the Electoral Commission to replace Foogooa.

She was appointed as Minister of Women's Affairs, Prices and Consumer Protection by Sir Seewoosagur Ramgoolam on 10 June 1975, becoming the country's first female minister and the inaugural minister in charge of the Ministry of Women's Affairs. Poonoosamy helped pass laws against sex discrimination.

In 1976, Poonoosamy ran for reelection as member of parliament for the constituency of Grand Baie and Poudre d'Or under the banner of Independence Party. However, she was placed sixth overall and lost the election.

Poonoosamy would be awarded the Order of the Star and Key of the Indian Ocean as a Grand Officer in 2006 in recognition of her services to the Mauritian nation.

== Ministerial appointment and national leadership ==
Poonoosamy's highest point of attainment came in 1975, when she was appointed Minister of Women's Affairs, Prices, and Consumer Protection. She became the first woman in Mauritian history to serve as a Cabinet minister.

Her ministry tackled various social and economic problems, such as consumer rights, cost-of-living issues, and programs promoting women in the workforce. That same year, she led the Mauritian delegation to the United Nations World Conference on Women held in Mexico City, where delegates discussed discrimination, access to education, and global strategies for improving women’s lives. World Conference on Women. Her term in office helped highlight women's and families' concerns, and her appointment heralded a shift in public expectations about the role of women in the highest echelons of government.

== Personal life ==
She married the physician Dr. Valaydon Poonoosamy, and they settled in Mauritius in 1952. She became a naturalized citizen thereafter.

Following two years of illness, Poonoosamy died at the age of 84 in Durban, South Africa, surrounded by her family.

== Later life ==
After the 1976 general election, Poonoosamy withdrew from national politics and continued to be involved in both community and educational activities pertaining to women’s affairs. She continued to speak publicly about social development, civic responsibility, and the importance of women’s participation in public life. In the 2000s, she was nationally recognized for her service, including being made a Grand Officer of the Order of the Star and Key of the Indian Ocean (GOSK). Her contributions remained a reference point for discussions relating to women's leadership in Mauritius.

== Legacy ==
Poonoosamy is celebrated as one of the pioneering figures for Mauritian women in politics. Scholars often refer to her as having played an important role in opening up space for women within a very formative period in the history of the country. Her leadership at both the municipal and national levels helped reshape expectations about women's participation in public office, and her involvement in international conferences helped connect Mauritius to global movements for gender equality. She continues to be described as a central figure in the history of women's political development in Mauritius through academic works, public retrospectives, and centenary commemorations. Women in Mauritius and Politics of Mauritius.
