= House of Zolotaryov =

- Дом Золотарёва (Russian)
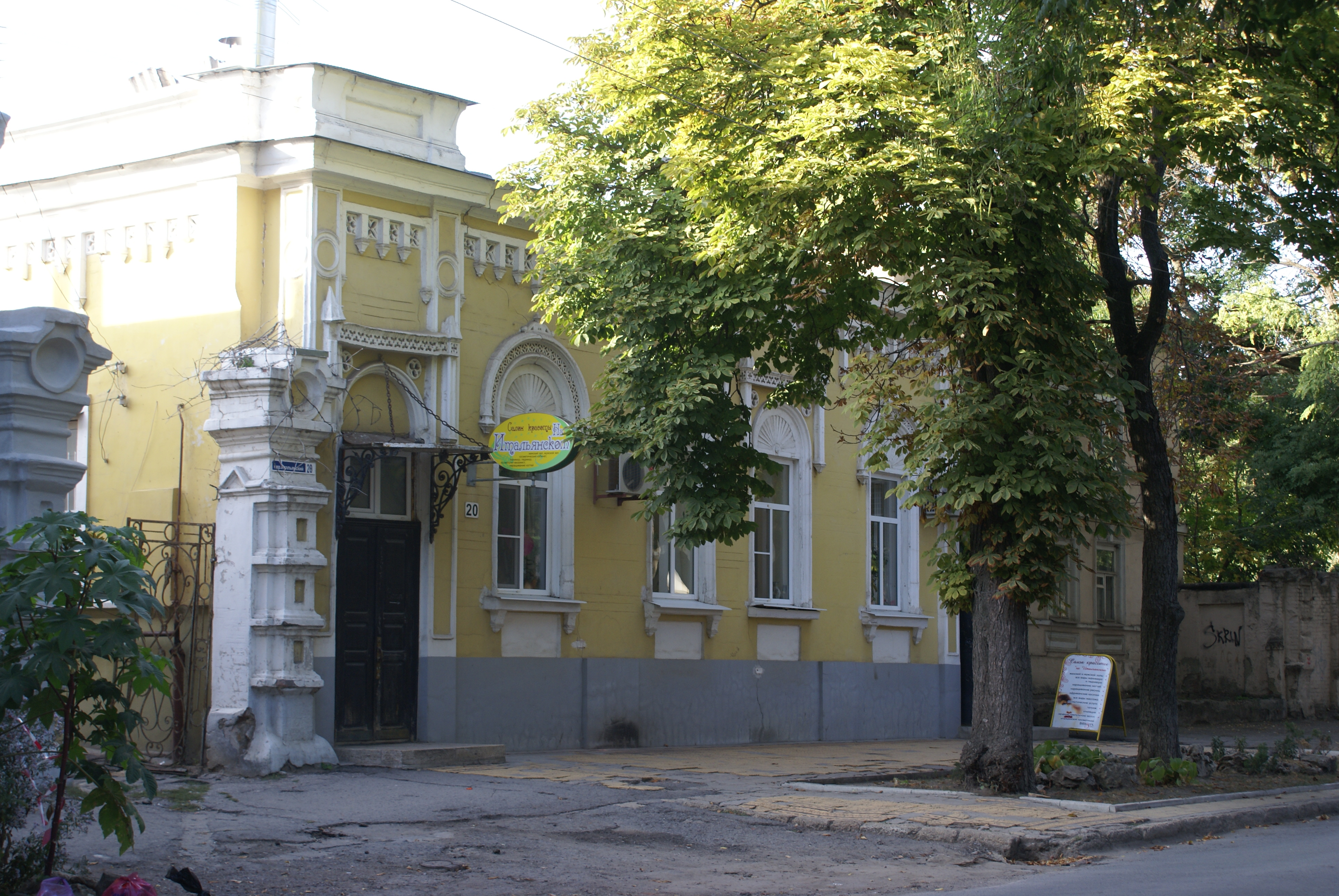
- Interactive map of the House of Zolotaryov area

General information
- Location: Taganrog, lane Italian, 20
- Coordinates: 47°12′43″N 38°55′47″E

The House of Zolotaryov (Russian: Дом Золотарёва) is a monument of architecture of the second half of the 19th century in the city of Taganrog of the Rostov Oblast. Locates at the address Italyansky Lane, 20.

== History and description ==
In the second half of the 19th century in Taganrog to the address Italyansky Lane, 20 the one-story mansion in style of eclecticism which for several decades changed a number of owners was built. At the end of the 1860th years, the house belonged to successors of Greek Dmitry Papanagioti. From 1873 to 1880 it appeared the property of the resident of Taganrog by the name of Hadzhiyev. At the end of the 1880th years, the house was bought by Elena Changli-Chaykina, and her relatives owned the house to the middle of the 1890th. About the following owner's data differ. One source demonstrates that after the middle of the 1890th the house was bought by successors of the merchant of the I guild Fedor Pavlovich Sifneo. According to other data, N. G. Divaris lived in the house from 1890 to 1898.

At the beginning of the 20th century Alexander Sergeyevich Zolotaryov, by the last name who the mansion and began to be called in Taganrog became the owner of the above-mentioned house. Is known of this owner a little: he was born in 1869, was a lawyer and the public figure, worked in the Taganrogsky Vestnik newspaper. In public life of the city, it was remembered as the opponent of the construction of the museum and library of Anton Pavlovich Chekhov. Since 1911 in the building the office of fashion magazines and dummies worked, tailoring was made, patterns were made. Dress-making courses were organized.

The facade of the stone house is decorated with a molding in the manner of the European architecture of that time. Over entrance doors metal peaks are located. The house, is built in style of eclecticism, combines elements of baroque, classicism, Mauritian and Romance architecture.

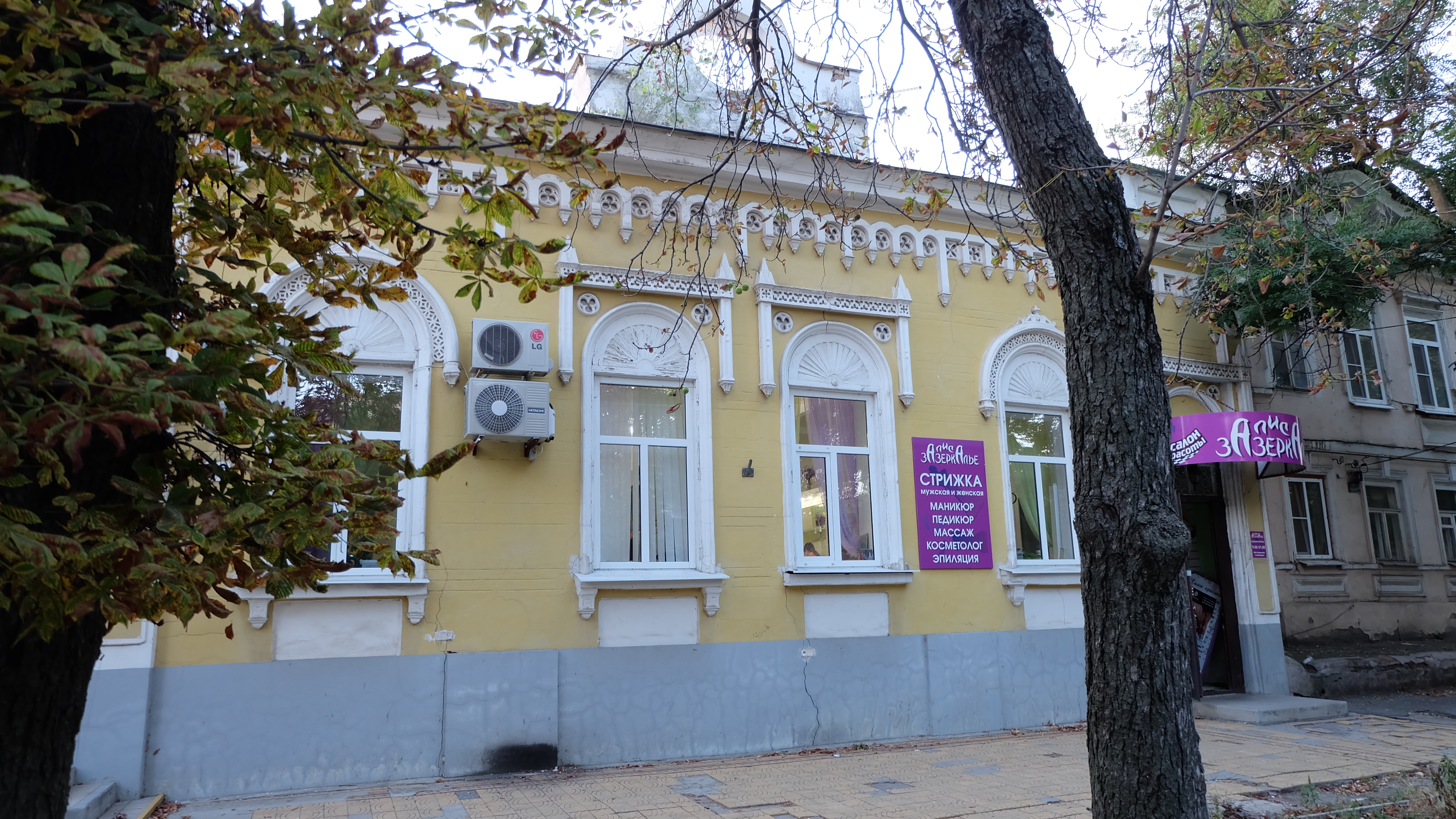

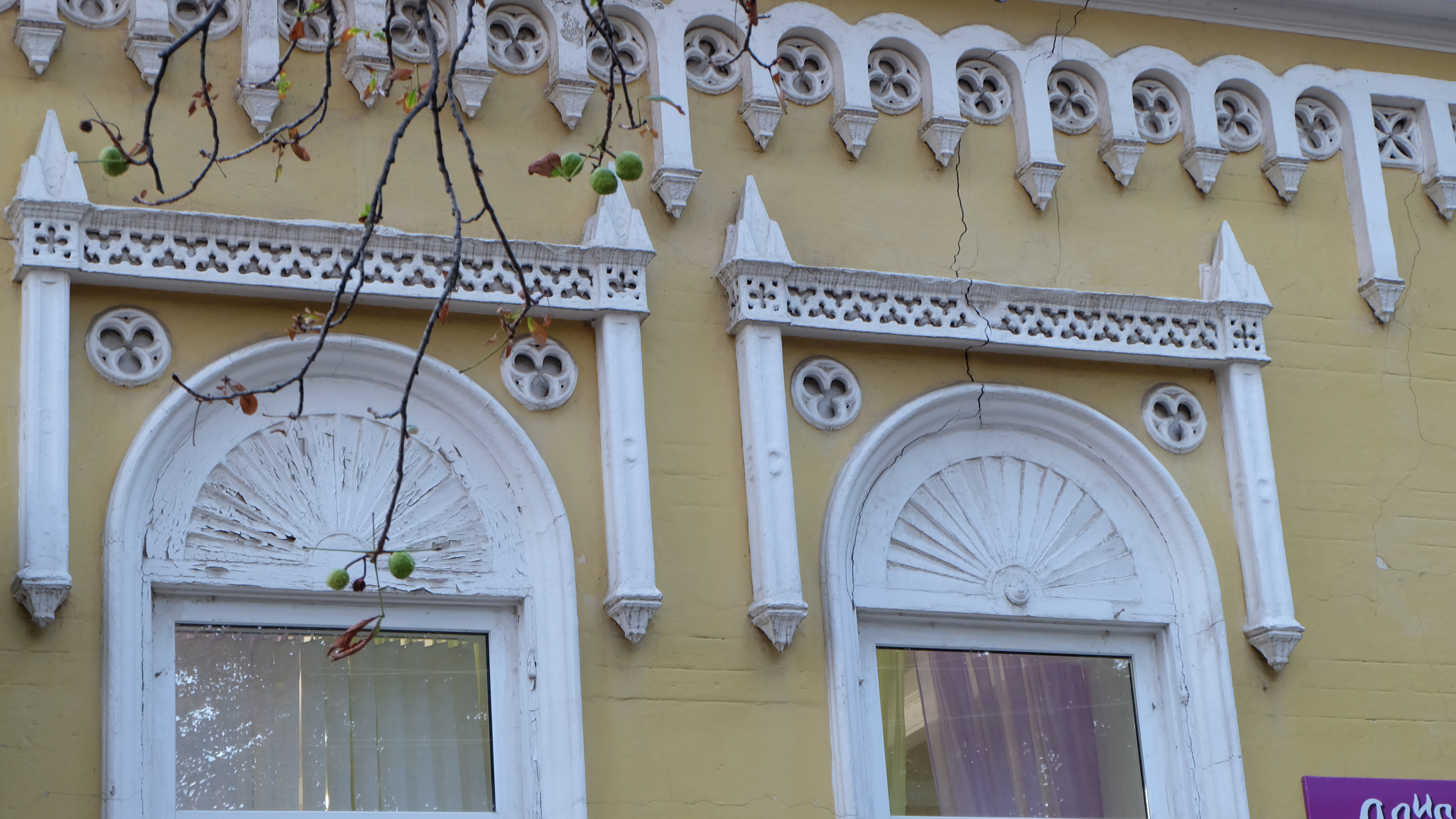

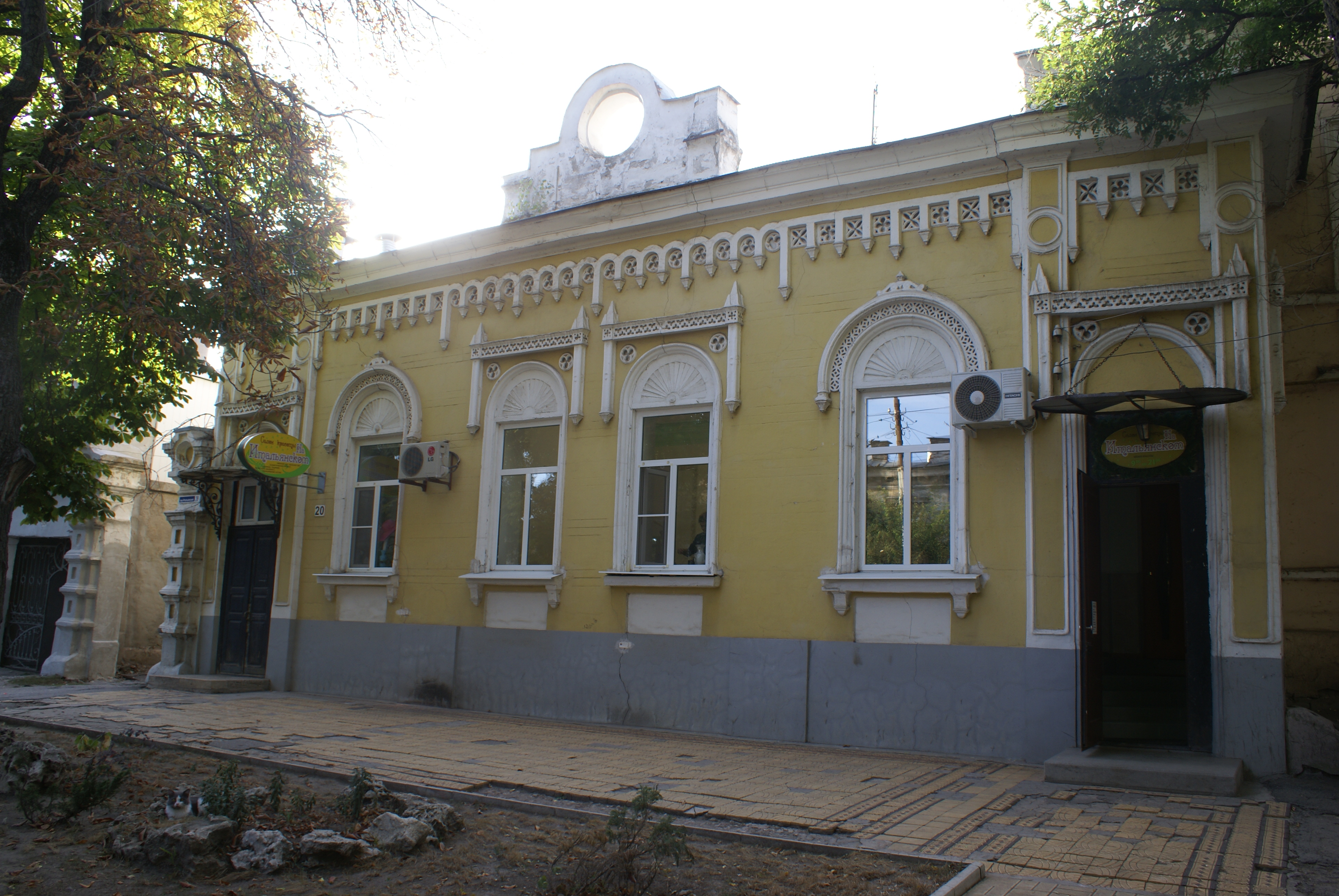
