= Viveka Babajee =

Mauritian model and actress (1973-2010)

- Born: Viveka Babajee; 27 May 1973; Port Louis, Mauritius
- Died: 25 June 2010 (aged 37); Bandra, Mumbai, India
- Modeling information
- Height: 5 ft 9 in (1.75 m)
- Hair color: Brown
- Eye color: Black

Viveka Babajee (27 May 1973 – 25 June 2010) was a Mauritian actress, model and beauty pageant titleholder. She held the titles of Miss Mauritius World 1993 and Miss Mauritius Universe 1994. She was best known for her KamaSutra condom advertisements in the 1990s, and for her involvement in the 1994 Manila Film Festival scandal.

Babajee was found hanging from the ceiling fan in her apartment on 25 June 2010, at her Bandra residence in Mumbai. Police reports stated that she committed suicide due to depression.

== Early life ==
The youngest of four sisters, Babajee was born in Port Louis, Mauritius on 27 May 1973. Her mother was Maharashtrian and was born in Hyderabad. Babajee moved to India in the mid-1990s.

== Pageantry ==
Babajee represented Mauritius in the Miss World 1993 pageant in South Africa and in the Miss Universe 1994 pageant held in the Philippines. Following the latter event, she stayed on in Manila as a guest of her fellow pageant competitor Ruffa Gutierrez and cohosted the awarding ceremonies of the 1994 edition of the Manila Film Festival, during which she was embroiled in a scandal over results tampering with Gutierrez and several others that saw her announce the wrong set of winners. She subsequently left the Philippines after being vilified by the local press and declared persona non grata in Manila but maintained that she was manipulated into participating in the incident.

== Career ==
Babajee achieved success in India with KamaSutra condoms commercials. She also participated in music videos for Daler Mehndi's "Boom Boom", Harbhajan Mann's "Hai Meri Billo" and Abbey's "Phir Se". In 2009, her company, Cream Events, achieved success with the help of her ex-boyfriend and business partner, Kartik Jobanputra. She later broke all ties with Cream Events.

As a model, Babajee walked the ramp for India's top designers including Ritu Kumar, Ritu Beri, Abu Jani and Sandeep Khosla, Rohit Bal, Suneet Varma, JJ Valaya, Tarun Tahiliani, and many others. In January 2010, she started her own event management business and managed projects like the Arjun Khanna show by Taj Colaba. Her company was named "VIBGYOR ENT" (Lifestyle and Boutik Events). VIBGYOR is an acronym for the seven colours of the rainbow (violet, indigo, blue, green, yellow, orange & red).

Viveka Babajee had been an anchor for FTV India. She made her debut film appearance in Yeh Kaisi Mohabbat, co-starring with Deeksha and Krishna, released in 2002. Even though the movie did poorly at the box office, Babajee's performance did not go unnoticed.

== Death ==
She was found hanging from the ceiling fan in her apartment on 25 June 2010, at her Bandra residence in Mumbai. The police reports stated that Babajee committed suicide due to depression. The last entry in her diary, which was found next to her body, said, "you killed me, Gautam Vohra," and unconfirmed reports stated that she became depressed after separating from her boyfriend, Vohra. However, in 2012, the case was re-opened by police after Vohra was arrested in connection with a murder case.

== Filmography ==
Year	Film	Role	Language	Notes
2002	Yeh Kaisi Mohabbat	Priya Thakral	Hindi	Bollywood debut

== See also ==
- List of people who died by hanging
- List of Mauritian models
