= Ministry of Equality =

The Ministry of Equality may refer to:

- Minister for Gender Equality (Denmark)
- Ministry of Gender Equality, Child Development and Family Welfare (Mauritius)
- Ministry of Gender Equality and Family (South Korea)
- Ministry of Equality (Spain)
- Ministry of Integration and Gender Equality (Sweden)
- Minister for Women and Equalities (UK)
