= Darren L'activiste =

Mauritian activist

Louis Dominique Seedeeal, mostly known as Louis Dominique Seedeeal Alias Darren activiste &Journaliste international Certidoc in page facebook Radio Mo Pep-Info Libre Mauritian social activist.

== Protest and arrest ==
On 22 April 2022, Louis Dominique Seedeeal Alias Darren activiste journaliste CertiDoc (EU)was arrested by the police for illegally organising a protest against rising prices of household gas and fuel in Mauritius. Following his arrest, a crowd gathered before the police headquarters at Les Casernes Central, Port Louis, demanding his release. Some rioting took place in parts of the country; the local police, Special Support Unit (SSU) and the Special Mobile Force (SMF) were deployed around the island to bring back law and order.

Seedeal was released on parole on the 24 April 2022, following which he called for calm and to wait for government action on fuel prices.
