= Menwar =

- Also known as: Lélou, Menwar
- Born: Stéphano Honoré; 21 October 1955 (age 70); Cassis, Mauritius
- Occupations: Percussionist, singer
- Years active: 1970s–present
- Website: http://menwar.net/

Stéphano Honoré (born 21 October 1955 in Cassis, Mauritius), better known as Menwar, is a Mauritian percussionist and singer. He was one of the pioneers of Seggae music, forming the group Sagaï in the 1980s. Honoré is a player of the ravanne, for which he has begun to develop a written technique, something that has not been done previously. He also plays multiple instruments that he has selfmade or that come from the African culture.

Honoré was born in Cassis, Port-Louis. He did not attend school, but attempted to play numerous sports and worked several jobs. He often listened to recordings of traditional Mauritian music, particularly sega (or séga) as a child. In 1977 he released two 45 rpm records on the Madagascar label Green Turtle and two more in 1978. Honoré was known as Lélou before his first cassette, Souvenir le port, was released in 1980, credited as Menwar. Honoré went back to Mauritius in 1993, but still traveled to and from the island of Réunion while producing and performing music. During the 1990s, he participated in a Marseille musical comedy entitled Mokko and was featured on another artist's album.

Honoré was named Artist of the Year by French radio station Radio France Internationale.

Honoré holds strong views about the Mauritian Creole community and the issues that this community and Mauritians in general faced and are still facing nowadays by singing stories inspired by his own life experiences or those of his relatives. Despite these ideas he is not politically active, in contrast with the musicians of seggae, a Mauritian musical genre which was very popular in the early 1990s.

== Discography ==
- 1980: Souvenir le port
- 1982: Létan l'enfer
- 1984: Kiltir dé zi
- 2006: Ay ay lolo

== See also ==
- List of Mauritian musicians
