= 1994 Manila Film Festival scandal =

Plot to alter award ceremony results

On June 22, 1994, during the 1994 Manila Film Festival awarding ceremonies in Manila, Philippines, host, actress and beauty queen Ruffa Gutierrez, her brother—actor Rocky Gutierrez, actress Nanette Medved, and Mauritian beauty queen Viveka Babajee read an erroneous set of winners for the Best Actor and Best Actress categories, which included Gutierrez herself, in a manner that raised suspicions of foul play. A subsequent investigation launched by Manila Mayor Alfredo Lim and testimony from a co-host, actress Gretchen Barretto, uncovered a plot involving the hosts and masterminded by the event's talent coordinator Lolit Solis to deliberately alter the results of the competition in favor of Gabby Concepcion, the initial winner of the Best Actor award whom she also managed as an agent, and Gutierrez, who was also his co-star in his film.

The scandal generated national uproar and was widely reported on in international media. It also led to criminal charges against the hosts (except Barretto), Solis, Concepcion and the Gutierrez siblings’ mother and manager Annabelle Rama, who were then referred to in the press as the "Filmfest Seven", although in the end only Solis was convicted.

== Background ==
The Manila Film Festival (not to be confused with the Metro Manila Film Festival) was an annual film festival held to celebrate the founding anniversary of Manila on 24 June 1571. The televised awarding ceremonies for the 1994 edition were held on 22 June at the Manila Midtown Ramada Hotel (now the site of the Robinsons Manila shopping mall) in the Ermita district. The accounting firm SyCip Gorres Velayo & Co. (SGV) was tasked with tabulating the results and selecting the winners.

The hosts for the Best Actor category were Ruffa Gutierrez, who was also a nominee for the Best Actress award, and Nanette Medved, while the hosts for the Best Actress category were Ruffa's younger brother Rocky, Viveka Babajee, who represented Mauritius in the Miss Universe 1994 pageant held in Manila a month before and was also a co-contestant of Ruffa in the Miss World 1993 pageant in South Africa, and Gretchen Barretto. Lolit Solis, who was the talent manager of Medved and Best Actor nominee Gabby Concepcion, was the event's talent coordinator.

== Events ==
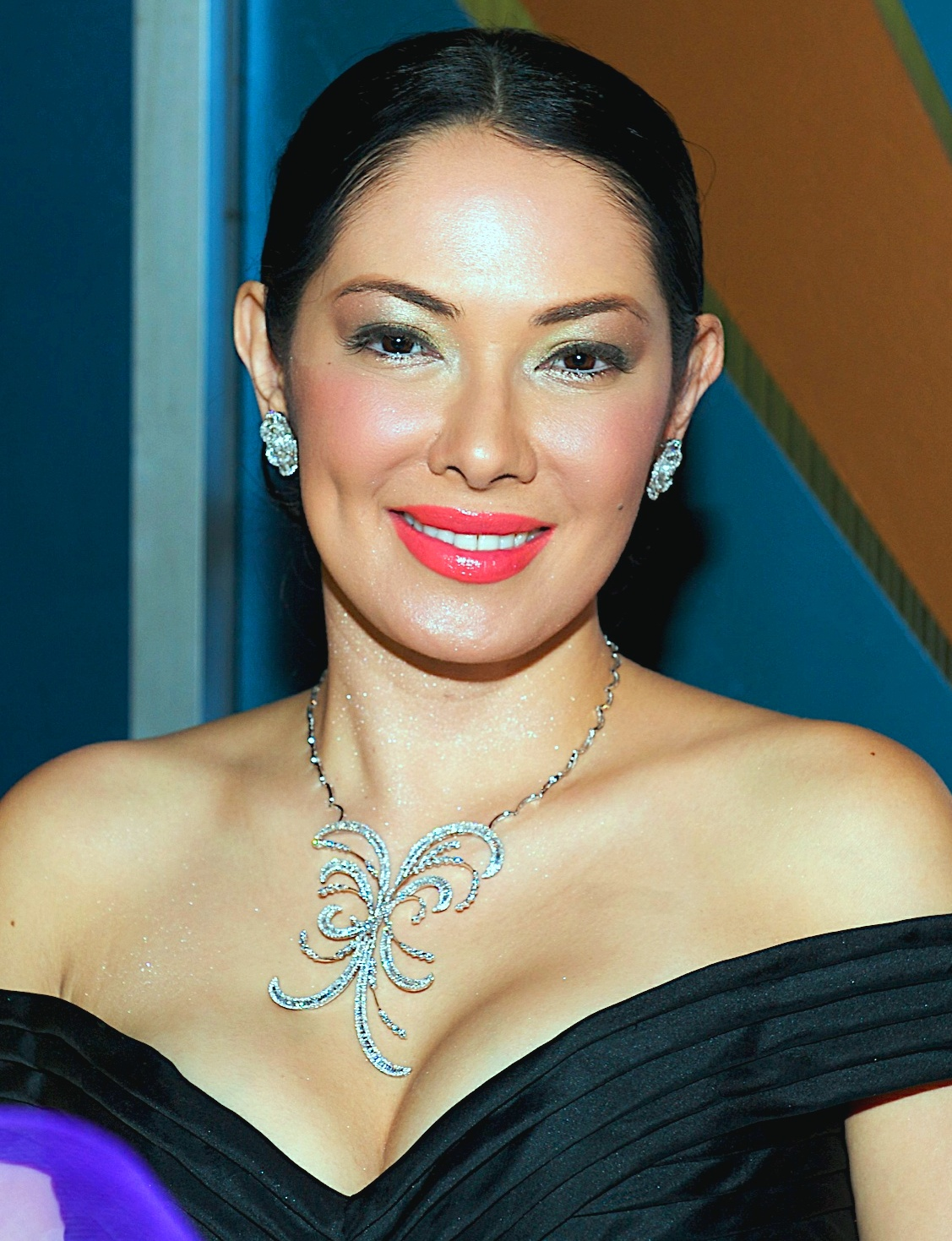
Ruffa Gutierrez

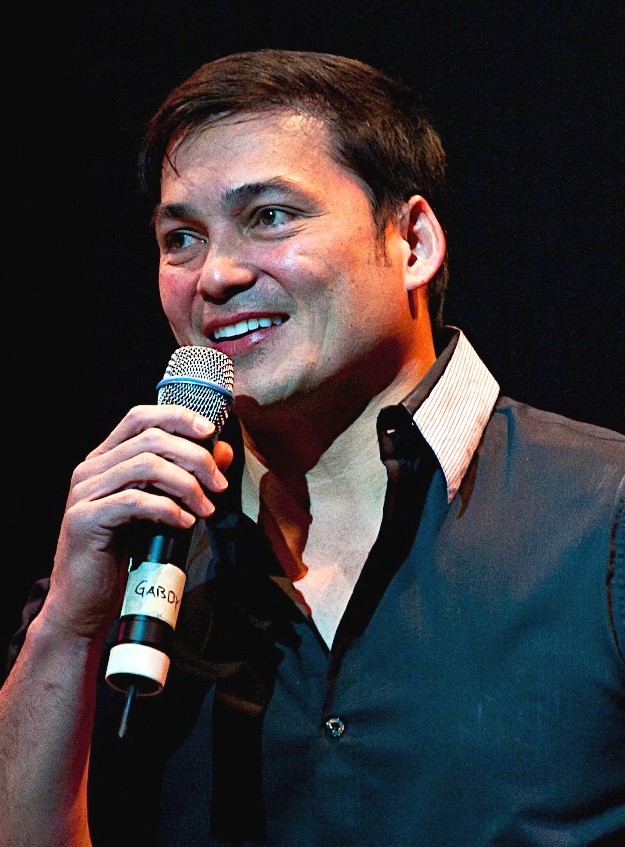
Gabby Concepcion

During the Best Actor award, Ruffa and Medved jointly announced Gabby Concepcion as the winner in that category for his role in the drama film Loretta, which was loosely based on the Lorena Bobbitt case and where Gutierrez was also in the lead actress role. In fact, the SGV representatives placed Concepcion at 3rd place and had given the award to Edu Manzano for his role in the action film Zacarias.

Viveka Babajee announced Gutierrez as the winner in the Best Actress category for her role in Loretta, when SGV had actually selected Aiko Melendez as the winner for her role in the drama film Maalaala Mo Kaya: The Movie.

The first signs of trouble were noticed when Babajee preempted Gretchen Barretto in announcing the results, which were supposed to be announced jointly, which led to Barretto expressing her astonishment and then looking suspiciously at her co-hosts in front of the cameras. While Ruffa was ascending the stage to claim the trophy, Babajee was heard on the microphone telling a sleepy-looking Rocky Gutierrez, "Take it, take it!" referring to the cue cards containing the names of the winners, which he pocketed, an act that was also caught on camera. The cards disappeared after the event.

SGV alerted Manila Mayor Alfredo Lim on what had happened, prompting Lim to take to the stage after the conclusion of the ceremony, by which time the hosts and most attendees had left, and announce to the remaining audience members and journalists that cheating had occurred and that Manzano and Melendez were the real winners.

== Impact ==
The incident was the second time within a year that Ruffa Gutierrez figured in a controversy, having been accused in 1993 by Senator Ernesto Maceda of engaging in high-priced prostitution in Brunei along with other actresses and models in what became known as the "Brunei Beauties" scandal, which she denied in a Senate hearing. It also became part of a series of controversies that hounded Gabby Concepcion during that time, which included the annulment of his marriage to actress Sharon Cuneta and other marital troubles as well as accusations of bigamy and failure to fulfill his contractual obligations in the entertainment industry.

Edu Manzano, the real winner in the Best Actor category, called the incident the "craziest thing that ever happened" to him. Aiko Melendez, the real winner in the Best Actress category, had her gown ripped during the commotion that followed Lim's announcement.

The scandal generated massive domestic and international coverage and uproar, with then-First Lady Amelita Ramos complaining that it dominated discussions among her hosts during an official visit to Europe. The Alex Boncayao Brigade, an urban hit-squad formation which broke off from the communist New People's Army, threatened to assassinate those implicated in the controversy unless they were brought to justice by the legal system, while cinemas in Manila and other cities refused to show films featuring Gutierrez and Concepcion.

In a 2022 interview, Solis admitted to having attempted to commit suicide at the height of the scandal.

== Investigation ==
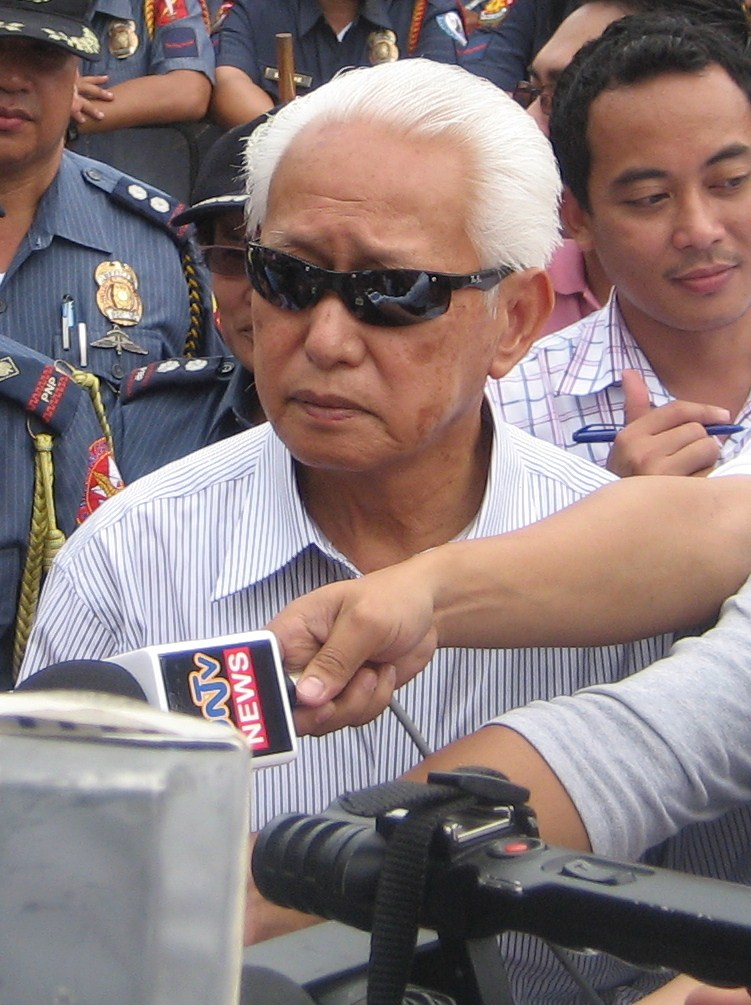
Alfredo Lim

An angry Lim ordered the Manila City Council to create a five-person fact-finding committee led by Vice Mayor Lito Atienza to investigate the incident and ordered Gutierrez and Concepcion to return their trophies while threatening to have Babajee deported. He also issued a summons for the hosts, Concepcion, and the Gutierrez siblings' mother and concurrent manager Annabelle Rama, to appear at Manila City Hall for an inquiry on 27 June. The subsequent investigation revealed that Viveka Babajee and Rocky Gutierrez conspired to switch envelopes containing the real winners' names with another set of envelopes that were allegedly prepared by Lolit Solis.

On 25 June, Gretchen Barretto held a press conference claiming that Lolit Solis had orchestrated the incident along with Annabelle Rama. Barretto also claimed that Solis offered to make her the Best Actress in the next edition of the film festival in exchange for her compliance. Both Solis and Rama denied the accusations.

Ruffa Gutierrez denied any involvement in the scandal and refused to return her award, while Solis threatened to burn Concepcion's trophy in front of Manila City Hall before giving it back, before later saying she was willing to exchange it for "cash", with a figure of $38,000 being mentioned. However, on 27 June, Ruffa, accompanied by her parents, personally returned her trophy at Lim's office at City Hall, where she broke down in tears and had to be escorted out by her colleague Robin Padilla upon being confronted by an angry mob, while Concepcion's trophy was quietly returned by Solis during the formal inquiry.

On 28 June, charges of fraud, deceit, grave scandal and obstruction of justice were filed against the Gutierrez siblings, Rama, Concepcion, Babajee, Medved and Solis by the Manila city government following the conclusions of the fact-finding committee's investigation. They became known subsequently as the “Filmfest Seven”.

Viveka Babajee, who was dubbed "Miss Malicious" and Babayka Babayo (translated from Filipino swardspeak as "bye-bye now and good riddance, see you never!") by the Philippine press, was declared persona non grata by the Manila city government but left the country on 26 June before any further action could be taken. In an interview with Ricky Lo prior to her departure, she expressed her belief that there was a conspiracy to manipulate the results but maintained that she was a victim who was unknowingly used in that effort, as she was a "stranger" in the country. She denied meeting Lolit Solis but said that she was recruited as a host after being approached by a man she could not identify, and agreed to do so after seeking advice from Annabelle Rama. She also maintained that the cue card she handled carried Ruffa's name and that her recorded instructions to Rocky were meant to tell him to get the trophy for his sister. She also acknowledged that she was a house guest of the Gutierrezes during her stay in the Philippines.

Immigration authorities also began looking into the residency status of Medved and Concepcion, who were said to be U.S. citizens. Both also left Solis' management. Medved later admitted her involvement and turned state witness, claiming that Ruffa had also deliberately participated in the scheme. Ruffa denied the claim, saying that she unwittingly read the switched results. Concepcion also named Solis as the mastermind of the scheme and expressed regret at agreeing to participate in it. The charges against him were quietly dropped after Lim left office, by which time Concepcion was living in the United States.

Eventually, Solis took responsibility for the incident as its mastermind and asked for forgiveness from the public, saying that she did it for Concepcion, who she said "instigated" the plot and who she said she "loved like a son". She also implicated Medved, while clearing the Gutierrezes. In an interview years after, she admitted fearing that Concepcion, whose career at the time, she said, was fading, would lose out on the award to Richard Gomez, the lead actor in Maalaala Mo Kaya: The Movie, and did not actually expect Edu Manzano to win instead. Of the Filmfest Seven, Solis was the only person convicted of the charges related to the controversy and was ordered to pay a fine and placed under court supervision under probationary law after pleading guilty.

In 2002, the Manila Regional Trial Court Branch 8 headed by Judge Felixberto Olalia Jr. dismissed the fraud charges against the Gutierrezes after their lawyers filed a demurrer to evidence, which was not countered by prosecutors. The judge ruled that while the defendants displayed deceit during the incident, there was insufficient evidence to prove that damages had been inflicted on the city of Manila, which was also in charge of the film festival committee. Olalia ordered the Manila city government to shoulder the cost of litigation amounting to P500,000, while also ordering the Gutierrez siblings to pay a sum of P50,000 as a fine.

== Aftermath ==
Gabby Concepcion quit acting after the scandal and moved to the United States, where he worked as a real estate agent before returning to the Philippines in 2008 to make a comeback in the entertainment industry. During his hiatus, he was sued by Lolit Solis, who accused him of not paying her commissions and related fees during her wardship. However, he filed a counterclaim and won the case in 2004, with the Court of Appeals ordering Solis to pay him P700,000 in damages and litigation fees instead.

Viveka Babajee pursued her acting and modeling career in India before committing suicide in Mumbai in 2010, 16 years to the day Gretchen Barretto spoke out on the scandal, from reasons unrelated to the controversy.

Nanette Medved and Rocky Gutierrez continued their acting careers but later retired, with Medved focusing on philanthropy.

Concepcion, Gretchen Barretto, Ruffa Gutierrez, Annabelle Rama and Lolit Solis continue to be active in the entertainment industry. Solis continued to manage artists and write entertainment columns, in addition to becoming the host of the long-running GMA Network entertainment talk show Startalk from its establishment in 1995 until its conclusion in 2015. In subsequent interviews, Solis expressed continuing regret over the affair, saying that she had apologized to and reconciled with the actors involved in the scandal, but had stopped attending awarding ceremonies after the controversy, which she referred to as both a "nightmare and the biggest lesson in her life".

Alfredo Lim's swift handling of the controversy raised his national profile and contributed to his decision to launch an ultimately unsuccessful bid for the Philippine presidency in the 1998 elections.

== In popular culture ==
The controversy was depicted in the 1995 biopic Alfredo Lim, Batas ng Maynila, with Eddie Garcia portraying Lim, Glenda Garcia as Gretchen Barretto, renamed as Greta Barredo in the film, Lani Lobangco as Nanette Medved, renamed as Nanette Mendez and Joy Viado as Lolit Solis, who was renamed Lilet Salas in the film. Those involved in the scandal were renamed in the film such as Ruffa Gutierrez (Rosa Gavielez), Gabby Concepcion (Gary Consolacion) and Edu Manzano (Eddie Magsino), except for Aiko Melendez and Viveka Babajee.
