= Shanawaz Allyboccus =

Mauritian footballer

Personal information
- Full name: Shanawaz Allyboccus
- Date of birth: 12 July 1984 (age 42)
- Place of birth: Mauritius
- Position: Defender

Senior career*
Years	Team	Apps	(Gls)
2010–	AS Rivière du Rempart	?	(?)

International career
2002	Mauritius	2	(0)
- * Club domestic league appearances and goals

Shanawaz Allyboccus (born 12 July 1984) is a Mauritian footballer who played as a defender for AS Rivière du Rempart. He won two caps for the Mauritius national football team in 2002.
