= Sylvain Content =

Mauritian footballer

Personal information
- Full name: Sylvain Content
- Date of birth: 22 January 1971 (age 55)
- Place of birth: Mauritius
- Position: Defender

Senior career*
Years	Team	Apps	(Gls)
2000–2005	Pamplemousses SC	?	(?)

International career
1998–2001	Mauritius	2	(0)
- * Club domestic league appearances and goals

Sylvain Content (born 22 January 1971) is a Mauritian former international footballer who played as a defender. He won two caps for the Mauritius national football team.
