= Diya Beeltah =

Mauritian model (born 1988)

- Born: Diya Beeltah; 1988 or 1989 (age 37–38); Quatre Bornes, Mauritius
- Occupations: Research assistant, Model
- Height: 1.72 m (5 ft 8 in)
- Beauty pageant titleholder
- Title: Miss Mauritius 2012
- Years active: 2012– present
- Hair color: Dark Brown
- Eye color: Brown
- Major competitions: Miss Mauritius 2012 (Winner); Miss Universe 2013

Diya Beeltah is an Indo-Mauritian model and beauty pageant titleholder who was crowned Miss Mauritius 2012. Diya was born on 8 August 1988 in Quatre Bornes, Mauritius. Diya completed her MBA from the University of South Wales. She was pursuing her bachelor's in human resource while making her breakthrough in modeling.

Beeltah was the first to represent Mauritius in the Miss Tourism World 2012 beauty contest which was held in Thailand. After reigning the title Miss Mauritius 2012, she became the ambassador and the national voice for road safety for the Mauritius Police Department and Ministry of Public Infrastructure, National Development Unit, Land Transport and Shipping National Development Unit. She also contributes to a NGO's in the fight against the spread of HIV/AIDS.

== Early life and career ==
Beeltah was born on 8 August 1988 in Quatre Bornes, Mauritius. She attended the Baichoo Madhoo Government school for her primary education then joined the College Bon et Perpetuel Secours of Beau-Bassin for her secondary studies. Diya got a BSC in Human Resource Management from the University of Mauritius (UOM) in 2011, she announced her intention to pursue her master's degree in the same field and aspires to become a lecturer. Diya was working as a research assistant at the UOM.

== Major competition and awards ==
Beeltah was crowned Miss Mauritius 2012 by Ameeksha Dilchand (Miss Mauritius 2011) at the Auditorium of J&J, Phoenix on 30 June 2012. A week prior to the finale, she won the Best Dress Award which is a preliminary of the Miss Mauritius contest and was runner-up for the Miss Siren/Beach Beauty Award.

Beeltah started participating in beauty pageants from 2012. She was crowned Miss Mauritius in 2012 and went on to seek the nomination for Miss Tourism World and Miss Universe 2013. She took part in the Miss Tourism World 2012. The event was considered the rehearsal of the following Miss Universe pageant during 2013. Beeltah participated in Miss Universe 2013 held on 9 November 2013 at the Crocus City Hall, Krasnogorsk, a suburb of Moscow, Russia as the official entry from Mauritius.

Year	Competition	Awards
2012	Miss Elegance	Nominated
2012	Best Dress	Won
2012	Miss Mauritius	Won
2012	Miss Tourism World	Nominated
2013	Miss Universe	Nominated

== Social work ==
Beeltah is passionate about social work and in her own words, "Solving the social issues that exist in the world today is not going to be easy, but I still firmly believe that addressing poverty, providing the right education and instilling proper values would be a good start.” After reigning the title Miss Mauritius 2012, she became the ambassador and the national voice for road safety for the Mauritius Police Department and Ministry of Public Infrastructure, National Development Unit, Land Transport and Shipping National Development Unit. She also contributes to a NGO's in the fight against the spread of HIV/AIDS.

Awards and achievements
Preceded by Ameeksha Dilchand	Miss Mauritius 2012; Miss Mauritius Universe 2013	Succeeded by Pallavi Gungaram
