= Ned Charles =

Mauritian former football striker

Personal information
- Date of birth: 28 May 1957 (age 69)
- Place of birth: Mahébourg, Mauritius
- Position: Striker

Team information
- Current team: VV-Emelgem-Kachtem (youth coach)

Senior career*
| Years | Team | Apps | (Gls) |
- RC Maurice
| 1979–1980 | Cercle Brugge | 2 | (0) |
- USF Le Puy
- UR Namur
- Walhain

International career
| | Mauritius | 9 | (1) |

Managerial career
- SV Oostkamp (youth coach)
- Cercle Brugge (youth coach)
- VV-Emelgem-Kachtem (youth coach)
- Royal FC Mandel United (youth coach)
- * Club domestic league appearances and goals

Ned Charles (born 28 May 1957 in Mahébourg) is a Mauritian former professional footballer who played as a striker. He represented Mauritius national team nine times, scoring once.

Charles spent most of his career in Belgium, after Cercle Brugge had discovered him. Even though he would only stay for one season and play twice for the green and black side, he settled in the Bruges area. At the end of his active playing career, Charles became youth coach for local team SV Oostkamp and in a later stage Cercle Brugge and VV-Emelgem-Kachtem.

After a spell in France with USF Le Puy, Charles returned to Belgium, ending his career with two Walloon teams: UR Namur and Wallonia Walhain.
