= Yuvna Kim =

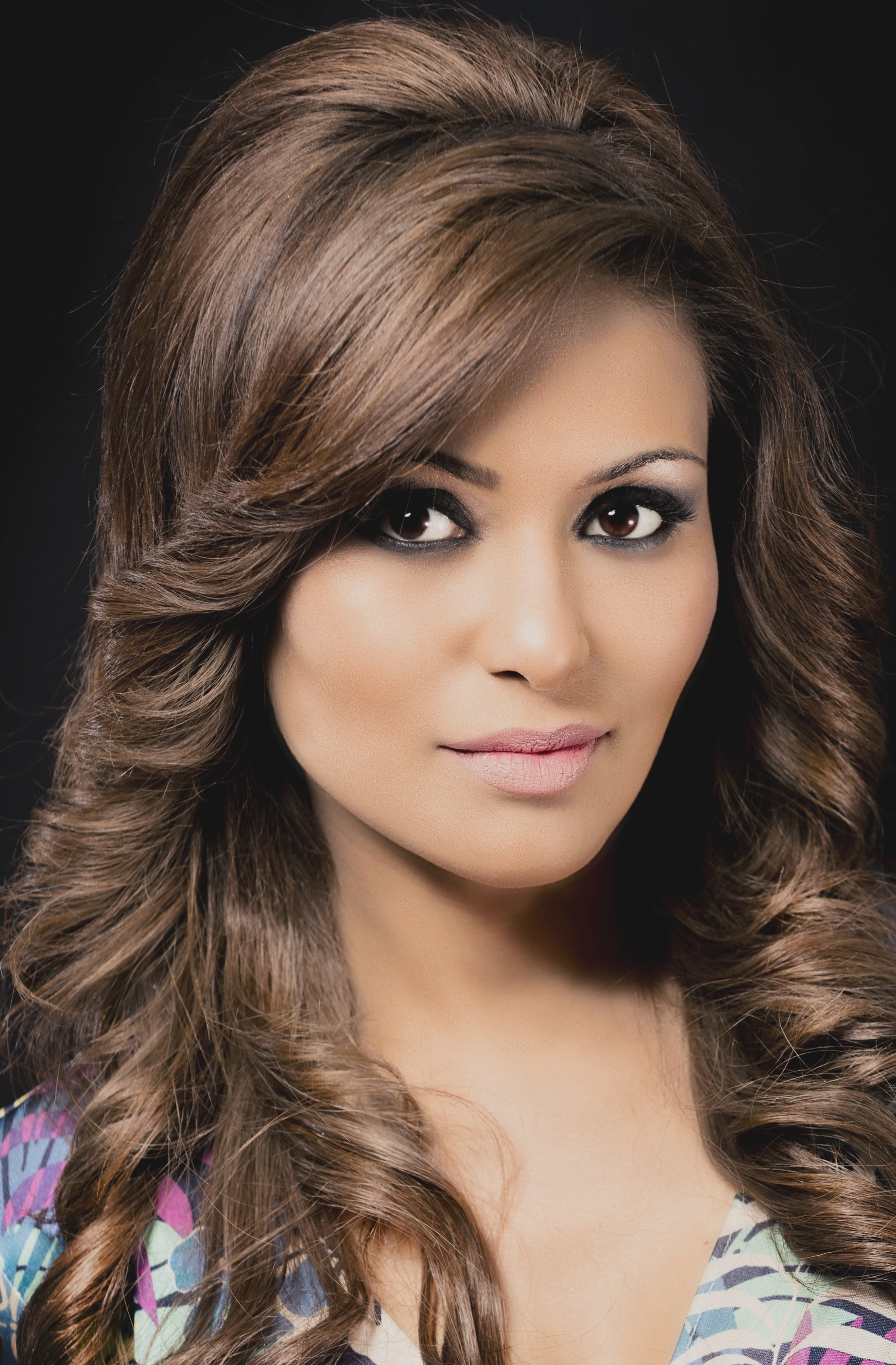
- Kim in 2011
- Born: Vacoas, Mauritius
- Other names: Yuvna Juggesur
- Occupation: Fashion Designer
- Website: Yuvna Kim London Maison De Couture

Yuvna Kim is a Mauritian-born, London-based fashion designer, model, and TV entertainment journalist.

== Early life and education ==
Kim is the eldest daughter of English Literature teacher and former member of the National Assembly Devendra Kim Currun and Vinitta Kim Currun She was raised in the town of Vacoas-Phoenix, in the Plaines Wilhems District of Mauritius Island, with her sister.

In 2002, Kim attended the Faculty of Law at University College London. She pursued a brief career in the legal profession.

== Career ==
Kim started as a model and an actor. She was the face of Sony Entertainment Television Asia and the host of the fashion segment on SNAPSHOT between 2010 and 2013.

In 2012, Kim launched her London-based fashion label Yuvna Kim London, specializing in bridal couture and Red Carpet gowns.

In 2015, she showcased her designs at London's Fashion Week.
