= Shirin Aumeeruddy-Cziffra =

Mauritian lawyer, politician and diplomat

The Honourable Shirin Aumeeruddy-Cziffra
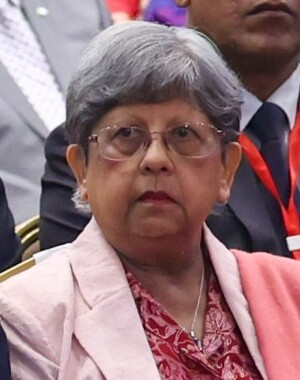
- Aumeeruddy-Cziffra in 2025

Speaker of the National Assembly
- Incumbent
- Assumed office 29 November 2024
- Deputy: Veda Baloomoody
- Preceded by: Adrien Duval

Attorney-General of Mauritius Minister of Justice
- In office 15 June 1982 – 22 March 1983
- Prime Minister: Anerood Jugnauth
- Preceded by: Paul Chong Leung
- Succeeded by: Kader Bhayat

Minister of Women’s Rights and Family Affairs
- In office 15 June 1982 – 22 March 1983
- Prime Minister: Anerood Jugnauth
- Preceded by: Radha Poonoosamy (Women's Affairs, Prices and Consumer Protection) (Note: Portfolio vacant from 1976.)
- Succeeded by: Sheila Bappoo

Member of Parliament; for Stanley and Rose Hill
- In office 20 December 1976 – 6 August 1991
- Preceded by: Cyril Leckning
- Succeeded by: Paul Bérenger

Mayor of Beau Bassin-Rose Hill
- In office 1987–1987

Ombudsman for Protection of Children
- In office 2004–2011

Personal details
- Born: Shirin Aumeeruddy; 15 October 1948 (age 77) British Mauritius
- Party: Independent (since 1995); Mauritian Militant Renewal (1994–1995); Mauritian Militant Movement (until 1994)
- Spouse: Claude Cziffra
- Occupation: Lawyer; activist; politician; diplomat

Shirin Aumeeruddy-Cziffra (born 15 October 1948) is a Mauritian lawyer, politician and diplomat. She has served as speaker of the National Assembly since 29 November 2024.

Aumeeruddy-Cziffra was the country's first female Attorney-General and minister of justice when she was first appointed to the government in 1982. In addition she was also made minister of women’s rights and family affairs. Following the split of the government, she resigned from her ministries in March 1983. Aumeeruddy-Cziffra would remain as member of the assembly until 1991 and became the Mauritian ambassador to France, Italy, Spain and Portugal from 1992 to 1995.

She was the head of the Public Bodies Appeal Tribunal (PBAT), which settles disputes of civil servants and local communities in matters related to recruitment and sanctions since 2009. She became the mayor of Beau Bassin-Rose Hill in 1987. She was Ombudsman for protection of children's rights from 2004 to 2011.

She was the first Muslim woman in Mauritius elected Member of Parliament, appointed Minister and elected Speaker of the National Assembly.

== Early life and career ==
She was born on 15 October 1948. Her native language is Mauritian Creole, while she speaks English and French. Aumeeruddy-Cziffra completed her law degree from the Inns of Court School of Law in Great Britain.

She was a women's activist in her early years and started Ligue Féministe in 1974, Solidarité Femmes in Mauritius in 1977. Along with 19 other women, she fought against the Immigration and Deportation Acts, which prevented spouses of foreign officials from seeking resident status. The case was argued with two set of victims, namely married women and single women espoused by the foreign officials. The court initially accepted only the case of married women. She eventually won the case in 1981.

== Political career ==
From 1982 to 1983, she was Minister of Women’s Rights and Family Affairs. She was the first Muslim woman to be elected as MP and to serve a ministerial position. During the same years, she served as Ambassador to UNESCO, Member of Parliament in Rose-Hill, and Attorney General for the Government of Mauritius.

She became the Mayor of Beau Bassin-Rose Hill in 1987.

Between 1992 and 1995, Aumeeruddy-Cziffra served as the Ambassador of Mauritius to Paris, Rome, Madrid and Lisbon.

In September 2000, she became a Chairperson (Chairman) for Mauritius Broadcasting Corporation (MBC).

She also served as Minister of Justice of Mauritius, President of the Permanent Council of the Francophonie and the International Organization of the Francophonie (OIF), Board member of the Agency of the Francophonie, Board of Directors Member of the Institute for Human Rights & Development (Gambia), Board Member of NGO Femme Africa Solidarité, and founding member of NGO Women in Law and Development in Africa.

She held the position of Ombudsman for protection of children rights from 2004 to 2011. In March 2011, she asked the government to adopt the optional protocol to facilitate collaboration between Mauritius and other countries on the war against sexual child abuse. In 2012, she became head of the Public Bodies Appeal Tribunal (PBAT), which settles disputes of civil servants and local communities in matters related to recruitments and sanctions. In 2015, her mandate was renewed for three more years. In March 2018, the PBAT's governance was reshuffled, and Shirin Aumeeruddy-Cziffra's mandate was once again renewed.

== Personal life ==
Aumeeruddy-Cziffra is married to Frenchman Claude Cziffra, a teacher and later radio presenter, who settled in Mauritius in 1974 and the pair have two children.

== Awards ==
- 2004: Honorary doctorate from the University of Paris Panthéon-Sorbonne for introducing a faculty of law to Mauritius and service overall.
- 2006: Tombouctou Award for her peace initiatives in Africa with FAS.
- 14 July 2015: Chevalier of the Legion of Honour by France’s Minister of Foreign Affairs.
- 2026: Commander of the Order of Legion of Honour
