= Nathalie Lesage =

Mauritian beauty pageant titleholder

- Born: 8 September 1993 (age 33); Réduit, Moka, Mauritius
- Height: 1.75 m (5 ft 9 in)
- Beauty pageant titleholder
- Title: Miss Mauritius
- Hair color: Dark Brown
- Eye color: Light Brown
- Major competitions: Miss World 2013; Miss Intercontinental 2014 (Top 16)

Nathalie Lesage (born 8 September 1993) is a Mauritian beauty pageant titleholder who was crowned Miss World Mauritius 2013 during the Miss Mauritius 2013 contest. Nathalie represented her country at the Miss World 2013 international beauty pageant where she vied to succeed Wen Xia Wu but was unplaced. She later competed in Miss Intercontinental 2014 where she placed among the top 16 semi-finalists. Nathalie has a brother, Yann and a sister, Melissa. She loves scuba diving and spending time with her dogs.

== Miss Mauritius 2012 ==
Nathalie Lesage was crowned Miss World Mauritius 2013 by Shalini Panchoo at the finals of Miss Mauritius 2012 beauty pageant at the Johnson & Johnson Auditorium in Phoenix on 30 June 2012. She also came as 2nd Runner-up for the Miss Talking Drums and Miss Elegance contest during the preliminaries of the Miss Mauritius beauty pageant.

Awards and achievements
| Preceded by Shalini Panchoo | Miss Mauritius 2012 (Runner-up); Miss Mauritius World 2013 | Succeeded by Sheetal Khadun |
