= Benoit Bouchet =

Mauritian windsurfer

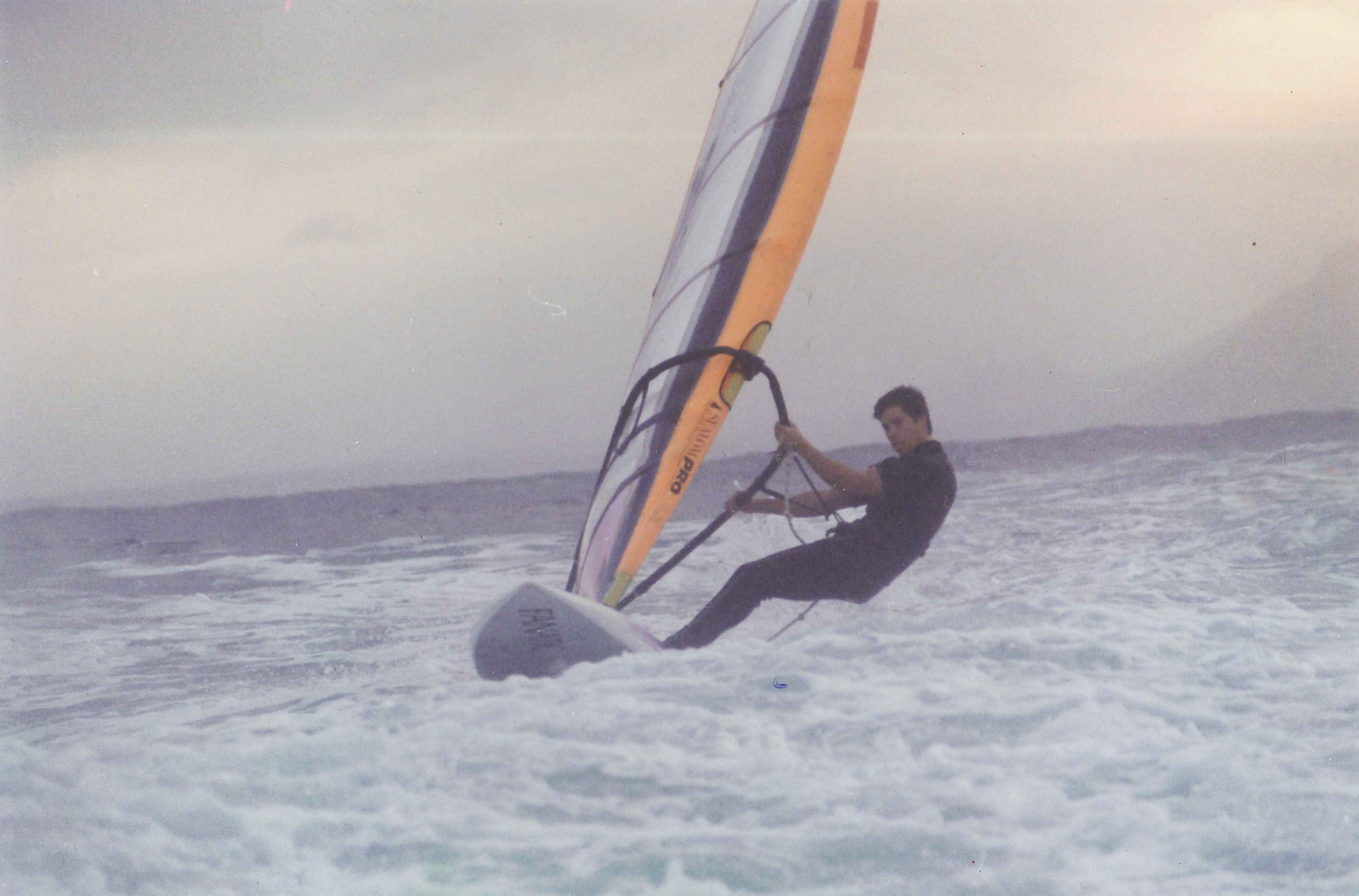
Benoit Bouchet leaving Mauritius, September 11, 1994

Serge Benoit de Robillard Bouchet (born September 7, 1973, in Curepipe, Mauritius) was the first Mauritian athlete to gain international recognition in the sport of windsurfing for sailing between Mauritius and Réunion Island unassisted.

== Career ==
At a young age, Benoit took up windsurfing under the watchful guidance of his experienced father, Serge de Robillard Bouchet. At the age of 21, Benoit set out to break the record for windsurfing between the two islands with the full support of his family.

On September 11, 1994, Benoit left the Mauritian shore at Morne Brabant at 6.15 am. His board of choice was the "Fanatic Mega Cat." Later that day, he landed on the shore of Reunion Island, Point De Cascade, Ste. Rose at 1.44 pm. He was carefully followed by a boat carrying his friends, family, and the local media crew during his journey.

Bouchet currently holds the record for being the first Mauritian to complete the distance of 170 km (106 mi) between Mauritius and Reunion in the time of 7h29m on a windsurf. He was awarded a sportsmanship medal for September 1994 by the Mauritian Minister of Sports, Michael Glover, in January 1995.
