= Loreto College of Rose-Hill =

Coordinates: 20.24°S 57.475°E

Loreto College Rose Hill(LCRH)

Location
- Dr. Roux Street; Rose Hill; Mauritius

Information
- School type: Private secondary school
- Motto: Cruci Dum Spiro Fido (While I Live, I Believe in the Cross)
- Denomination: Roman Catholic
- Established: 1951
- Rector: Cathy de Cazanove
- Gender: Girls'
- Age range: 11–18
- Average class size: 32
- Language: French & English
- Hours in school day: 6 hours
- Classrooms: many classes more than 30.
- Colour: Green
- Sports: Volleyball, football, basketball, badminton and swimming classes are offered to form 1-2 at Serge Alfred swimming pool
- Newspaper: school magazine

Loreto College Rose Hill is a private secondary girls' school in Rose Hill, Mauritius. One of seven Loreto College campuses in Mauritius, it opened in 1951. Cathy de Cazanove is the current rector and the asst. rector is Geraldine Bouquet André.

== History ==
On 8 September 1845, a small community of Loreto Sisters arrived in Mauritius, led by Sister Augustin Hearne. Consisting of a group of eight sisters from England, they installed in Port-Louis and opened a non-paying secondary school. In the following years they opened three more secondary schools in Curepipe, Quatre-Bornes and St-Pierre. In 1951, a fifth secondary school in Rose-Hill was opened.

== Curriculum ==
Loreto College Rose Hill is the only non-paying secondary school which offers German language as a subject which is compulsory from Grade 7 to Grade 9. Moreover, some students also choose German language for their A-level. Loreto College Rose Hill also offers Hindi language as a subject.

The school is equipped with a biology, chemistry, physics and Junior Lab. Also, three art rooms and a Design lab.

== Sports and traditions ==
LCRH has a gymnasium in which the regional competitions are held every year, most of the time for the volleyball competition.

The school's students participate in a variety of sports including basketball, football, handball, netball, and volleyball. They are particularly known for volleyball and hold an annual volleyball tournament.

In a show of solidarity with the poor, the school holds an annual charity meal when students bring in food and share with the poor and each other. Every last Saturday of the month, the school's charity club gives food to those in need, bought from money the girls voluntarily give on a weekly basis.

== Notable alumnae ==
- Ameeksha Dilchand, former Miss Mauritius

== See also ==
- List of secondary schools in Mauritius
- Education in Mauritius
