= Yeh Kaisi Mohabbat =

- Directed by: Dinkar Kapur
- Written by: Aadesh K. Arjun; Y.N. Kapoor
- Produced by: Ashok Kotwani
- Starring: Krishna Abhishek; Deeksha; Sharad Kapoor; Viveka Babajee; Deepak Tijori; Mukesh Rishi
- Cinematography: S. Pappu
- Music by: Sandeep Chowta
- Production company: Ascho Media Arts
- Release date: 31 May 2002 (India)
- Country: India
- Language: Hindi

Yeh Kaisi Mohabbat is a 2002 Indian Hindi-language romantic thriller film directed by Dinkar Kapur. It stars Krishna Abhishek, Deeksha, Sharad Kapoor, Deepak Tijori, Viveka Babajee, and Mukesh Rishi in pivotal roles. Actress Deeksha was cast as a replacement for Sakshi Shivanand.

== Plot ==
Vicky is a happy-go-lucky boy. He is always in search of a rich girlfriend. Vicky lives in a motor garage with his friends. One day, he falls in love with a girl, Tina. Vicky represents himself as a rich man and begins a romance with Tina. On another occasion, he rescues a wealthy man, Rahul Thakral, from a few assassins. Rahul thanks Vicky and offers him a job. The job is to spy on his wife, Priya. Vicky is shocked to see that Priya is Tina's lookalike. Priya realises that Vicky is spying on her; she befriends and tries to seduce him. In a birthday celebration for Priya, Vicky goes to Thakral's home. When Priya goes indoors, Vicky hears a scream and enters, finding the dead body of Priya. He panics and runs away, but investigating ACP is on the lookout for him. Vicky's friends tell the police of his whereabouts, and he is arrested. He gets to attend the funeral for Priya and forces them to open the coffin, only to find that the woman inside is not Tina's lookalike Priya, but someone else.

== Cast ==
- Krishna Abhishek as Vicky
- Deeksha as Tina / Priya
- Sharad Kapoor as Rahul Thakral
- Viveka Babajee as Priya Thakral
- Deepak Tijori as Vijay Pal
- Mukesh Rishi as Police Commissioner
- Johnny Lever as Paaji
- Dinesh Hingoo as Gurkha Bahadur
- Junior Mehmood as Bhaaji
- Aanjjan Srivastav as Ratanlal

== Soundtrack ==
Music composed by Sandeep Chowta.

1. "Akeli Hai Raat" - Alka Yagnik
2. "Din Jawani Ke Char Char" - Sunidhi Chauhan
3. "Jhol Jhol" - Sonu Nigam
4. "Main Hoon Akela" - Sukhwinder Singh
5. "Mere Khuda Tu" - Alka Yagnik
6. "Pyar Hai Tumse" - Shaan, K. S. Chitra
7. "Yeh Kaisi Mohabbat" - Kumar Sanu, Alka Yagnik
