= Ameeksha Dilchand =

Ameeksha Devi Dilchand
- Born: Ameeksha Devi Dilchand; 26 October 1988 (age 37); Curepipe, Mauritius
- Height: 1.76 m (5 ft 9 1/2 in)
- Beauty pageant titleholder
- Title: Miss Mauritius 2011; Miss Talent 2011 Beach Beauty Award
- Hair color: Dark brown
- Eye color: Dark brown
- Major competitions: Miss Mauritius 2011 (Winner); Miss Universe 2012 (Unplaced); Miss International 2012 (Unplaced)(Miss Congeniality)

Ameeksha Dilchand; (born 26 October 1988) is a Mauritian beauty pageant titleholder who was crowned Miss Mauritius 2012. Ameeksha attended the Notre Dame de la Confiance RCA school for her primary education, and later joined the Loreto College of Rose-Hill for her secondary studies. Ameeksha completed her LLB (hons) from University College London (UCL).

She was crowned Miss Mauritius in the year 2011. In October 2012, she became the second Mauritian woman to win an award for Mauritius, after Anaïs Veerapatren. She participated in Miss Universe 2012 at Las Vegas and at the Miss International 2012 where she finished 17th.

Following her election as Miss Mauritius, Ameeksha has joined a NGO to be able to help kids who suffer from Cleft lip and palate as the Operation Smile Ambassador. She is also a member of the Lupus Alert, helping to raise awareness about the life-threatening disease, lupus.

== Early life ==
Ameksha was born on 26 October 1988 in Mauritius to Dilchands - her father worked as a teacher and her mother, as a nurse. Ameeksha attended the Notre Dame de la Confiance RCA school for her primary education, then joined the Loreto College of Rose-Hill for her secondary studies. Ameeksha is an LL.B. (hons) holder from the University College London.

Ameeksha also received a scholarship from the IIFT for a course in "Fashion and Design" in India during the Miss Mauritius Pageant 2011. She played football at national level. She has also been lately very active on her personal blog, revealing a lot of wrongdoings of her surroundings. She is also a Manchester United fan.

Following her election as Miss Mauritius, Ameeksha has joined a NGO to be able to help kids who suffer from Cleft lip and palate as the Operation Smile Ambassador. She is also a member of the Lupus Alert, helping to raise awareness about the life-threatening disease, lupus. Ameeksha, also announced on her Facebook account that she now holds the franchise of Miss Supranational Mauritius which means that Mauritius will now participate in Miss Supranational as well.

== Competitions ==
Dilchand was crowned as the Miss Mauritius 2011 during the annual ceremony held on Saturday night, August 6, 2011, at the J & J Auditorium, Phoenix. A week prior to the finale, she also won the Miss Talent Award which is a preliminary of the Miss Mauritius contest. She also came as runner up for the beach beauty-swimsuit competition. At the Miss International 2012 which was held at Okinawa, Japan on 21 October 2012, Ameeksha ranked fifth in Miss Internet Popularity and fourth in Miss Talent, ranking 17th overall and won the Miss Friendship award. Being the Miss Mauritius 2011, the winner represented Mauritius in Miss Universe 2012 at Las Vegas, Nevada, United States on 19 December 2012, competing for the crown with 88 others.

Awards and achievements
| Preceded by Laetitia Darche | Miss Mauritius 2011; Miss Mauritius Universe 2012 | Succeeded by Diya Beeltah |
