= Steeve Curpanen =

Mauritian footballer

Personal information
- Full name: Mike-Steeve Curpanen
- Date of birth: 15 May 1972 (age 54)
- Place of birth: Mauritius
- Position: Defender

Senior career*
Years	Team	Apps	(Gls)
2000–2001	Pamplemousses SC	?	(?)
2001–2008	Olympique Moka	?	(?)

International career
1998–2003	Mauritius	8	(0)
- * Club domestic league appearances and goals

Steeve Curpanen (born 15 May 1972) is a Mauritian former international footballer who played as a defender. He won eight caps for the Mauritius national football team. After his retirement, he was repeatedly arrested on drug trafficking charges. On 1 April 2026, police raided his residence, but he managed to evade arrest. Officers discovered cannabis and cannabis oil allegedly intended for distribution. He is currently wanted by the police.
