= Danika Atchia =

Mauritian model

- Born: Danika Korail Atchia; Port Louis, Mauritius
- Height: 170 cm (67 in)
- Beauty pageant titleholder
- Title: Miss Mauritius 2015
- Hair color: Brown
- Eye color: Brown
- Major competitions: Miss Mauritius 2015 (Winner) (Miss Elegance) (Best Talent); Top Model of the World 2015 (Unplaced); Miss European Union Tour 2016 (TBA)

Danika Atchia is a Mauritian model and beauty pageant titleholder who was crowned Miss Mauritius 2015 and represented her country at Miss European Union Tour 2016 pageant. Atchia attended the University of Prince Edward Island and was part of their athletics team UPEI Panthers from 2018 till 2020.

== Personal life ==
=== Miss Mauritius 2015 ===
June 27, 2015, Atchia was crowned as Miss Mauritius 2015 at the Club Med La Plantation d'Albion. At the same event, the 1st Runners-up was Miss World Mauritius 2015, Veronique Allas and the 2nd Runner-up became Miss International Mauritius 2015, Manjusha Faugoo. As Miss Mauritius, Danika earned the right to represent her country at the Miss European Union Tour 2016 pageant.

In 2015, Danika went to Top Model of the World 2015 to represent Mauritius.

== Awards ==
- Miss Mauritius 2015 - Won
- Miss Elegance 2015 - Won
- Miss Talent 2015 - Won
