= Urvashi Gooriah =

Mauritian beauty pageant titleholder born 1999

Urvashi Gooriah उर्वशी गोरिया
- Born: January 8, 1999 (age 27); Mauritius
- Height: 5'9
- Beauty pageant titleholder
- Title: Miss Mauritius 2018
- Hair color: Dark brown
- Eye color: Black
- Major competition: Miss World

Urvashi Devi Gooriah (born March 8 January 1999) is a Mauritian model, entrepreneur and beauty pageant titleholder who was crowned Miss Mauritius 2018. She represented Mauritius at Miss World and is an active member as VoY (Voices of Youth) at Unicef. Urvashi has represented her country during the Miss World 2019 pageant competition.

== Miss Mauritius Competition 2018 ==
Year 2018	Competition	Status	Notes
2018	Miss Mauritius	Won	
