= Caroline Lenferna de Laresle =

Mother Superior Caroline Lenferna de Laresle
- Born: March 20, 1824; Pointe-aux-Piments, Mauritius
- Died: January 28, 1900 (aged 75); Rome, Italy

Caroline Lenferna de Laresle (20 March 1824 – 28 January 1900) also known as Sister/Mother Marie-Augustine was a Mauritian nun who founded the Congrégation des sœurs de charité de Notre-Dame-du-Bon-et-Perpétuel-Secours.

== Life ==
Caroline Lenferna de Laresle was born in Pointe-aux-Piments, Mauritius, on 20 March 1824. At the time she was growing up there were very few Roman Catholic community leaders in Mauritius. There were only five parishes, with around the same number of priests and no nuns at all. The few priests were often on poor terms with one another, as such de Laresle was not baptised at birth. She attended a boarding school run by a Mrs Farquarson in Port Louis. At the school de Laresle requested to be baptised, with this being carried out in 1835; she took her first holy communion the very next day.

Afterwards, inspired in part by Father Xavier Masuy, a Belgian priest; Father Jacques-Désiré Laval; and Bishop Bernard Collier Bishop of Port Louis, de Laresle decided to devote her life to charity and become a nun. As her father could not afford to send her to France for training, she studied as a novitiate under the Ladies of Loreto, who had arrived in Mauritius in 1845. De Laresle took her vows as a nun on 1 May 1849, adopting the name Marie-Augustine.

De Laresle founded her own order of nuns, the Congrégation des sœurs de charité de Notre-Dame-du-Bon-et-Secours (Congregation of Sisters of Charity of Our Lady of Good Help) on 18 June 1850. The order had six nuns by 1855 and expanded to more than 60 by 1860. The order began in Port Louis and within 17 years had established 20 convents, hospitals, hospices, schools and nurseries. De Laresle had been inspired to open the first orphanage after discovering an abandoned baby on Christmas Day. The sisters founded their first primary school at Camp Yoloff, Faubourg de l'Est in 1853 and in 1855 came to the aid of the victims of an outbreak of cholera. The order also ran a leper colony, and from 1868 the sisters also served in the Civil Hospital (now known as the Dr AG Jeetoo Hospital).

As Mother Superior, de Laresle resisted control of the order by the successors of Collier as bishop of the Roman Catholic Diocese of Port-Louis. De Laresle visited Rome to petition for the order to be granted the pontifical right, bringing it under jurisdiction of the pope and removing it from diocesan control. This was granted by Pope Leo XIII, and in recognition of this the order added "Perpetual" to their name. De Laresle died whilst in Rome on 28 January 1900.

== Legacy ==
Her order continues to this day and now has branches in Europe, Africa, Europe, Asia, and South America. Father Carmello Conti Guglia of the Missionary Oblates of Mary Immaculate spent four years collecting de Laresle's correspondence and wrote a biography that was published in Italy and is now being translated into French. Material uncovered by his research is being used to promote de Laresle's beatification.
