= Ministry of Gender Equality and Family Welfare (Mauritius) =

Government ministry of Mauritius

- Coat of arms of Mauritius

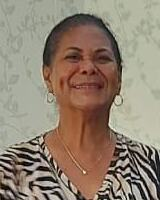
- Incumbent; Arianne Navarre-Marie since 22 November 2024
- Nominator: Prime Minister of Mauritius
- Appointer: President of Mauritius
- Term length: 5 years or earlier, renewable
- Website: Ministry of Gender

The Ministry of Gender Equality and Family Welfare is a cabinet-level division of the Government of Mauritius. As of November 2024, the minister responsible is Arianne Navarre-Marie.

== Name ==
The department has been known under several different names, including:

- Ministry of Gender Equality and Family Welfare
- Ministry of Women's Rights, Child Development and Family Welfare

== Ministers ==
In 1991, Sheilabai Bappoo began serving as Minister for Women's Rights, Child Development and Family Welfare. She left the ministry in 1995.

From September 2000 until July 2005, Marie Arianne Navarre-Marie served as Minister of Women’s Rights, Child Development & Family Welfare.

The position was held by Bappoo as the Minister of Gender Equality, Child Development and Family Welfare from May 2010 until August 2011, when she was succeeded by Maria Francesca Mireille Martin until December 2014. Marie Aurore Marie-Joyce Perraud then served as minister until December 2016.

The position was held by Fazila Jeewa-Daureeawoo from January 2017 until November that same year. She was succeeded by lawyer Roubina Jadoo-Jaunbocus, however, she was removed from the position in July 2018 after an inquiry accused her of meeting with jailed drug traffickers who were not her clients. Jeewa-Daureeawoo took up the position again, and remained Minister until November 2019.

From November 2019 to October 2024, Kalpana Devi Koonjoo-Shah was appointed Minister of Gender Equality and Family Welfare.

In November 2024, Marie Arianne Navarre-Marie was appointed Minister of Gender Equality and Family Welfare.

== List of ministers ==
Minister	Term of office		Portfolio title	Party	Prime minister
Radha Poonoosamy	10 June 1975	27 December 1976	Women's Affairs, Prices and Consumer Protection	PTr	S. Ramgoolam
Shirin Aumeeruddy-Cziffra	15 June 1982	11 March 1983	Women's Rights and Family Welfare	MMM	A. Jugnauth
Sheila Bappoo	27 August 1983	30 September 1991	Women's Rights and Family Welfare	MSM	A. Jugnauth
Sheila Bappoo	30 September 1991	27 December 1995	Women's Rights, Child Development and Family Welfare	MSM	A. Jugnauth
Indira Thacoor-Sidaya	30 December 1995	17 September 2000	Women, Child Development and Family Welfare	PTr	N. Ramgoolam
Arianne Navarre-Marie	17 September 2000	5 July 2005	Women's Rights, Child Development and Family Welfare	MMM	A. Jugnauth
Arianne Navarre-Marie	17 September 2000	5 July 2005	Women's Rights, Child Development and Family Welfare	MMM	Bérenger
Indranee Seebun	7 July 2005	13 September 2008	Women's Rights, Child Development, Family Welfare and Consumer Protection	PTr	N. Ramgoolam
Indranee Seebun	13 September 2008	10 May 2010	Women's Rights, Child Development and Family Welfare	PTr	N. Ramgoolam
Sheila Bappoo	10 May 2010	18 August 2011	Gender Equality, Child Development and Family Welfare	PTr	N. Ramgoolam
Mireille Martin	18 August 2011	13 December 2014	Gender Equality, Child Development and Family Welfare	PTr	N. Ramgoolam
Aurore Perraud	17 December 2014	19 December 2016	Gender Equality, Child Development and Family Welfare	PMSD	A. Jugnauth
Fazila Jeewa-Daureeawoo	19 December 2016	16 November 2017	Gender Equality, Child Development and Family Welfare	MSM	A. Jugnauth
Fazila Jeewa-Daureeawoo	19 December 2016	16 November 2017	Gender Equality, Child Development and Family Welfare	MSM	P. Jugnauth
Roubina Jadoo-Jaunbocus	16 November 2017	17 July 2018	Gender Equality, Child Development and Family Welfare	MSM	P. Jugnauth
Fazila Jeewa-Daureeawoo	17 July 2018	12 November 2019	Gender Equality, Child Development and Family Welfare	MSM	P. Jugnauth
Kalpana Koonjoo-Shah	12 November 2019	12 November 2024	Gender Equality and Family Welfare	MSM	P. Jugnauth
Arianne Navarre-Marie	22 November 2024	Incumbent	Gender Equality and Family Welfare	MMM	N. Ramgoolam
