= Manila Tagalog Film Festival =

Filipino film festival

- Location: Manila, Philippines
- Founded: 1966; 1991 (revival)
- Disestablished: 1975; 2004 (after revival)
- Successor: Metro Manila Film Festival
- Language: Filipino

The Manila Tagalog Film Festival, also known as the Manila Film Festival, was a film festival organized in the city of Manila, Philippines. It is considered as the precursor to the Metro Manila Film Festival.

== History ==
Then-Manila Mayor Antonio Villegas inaugurated the "Manila Film Festival" ("Manila Tagalog Film Festival"). The annual film festival ran for 10 days starting on the foundation day of Manila on June 24. During the run of the event, only Philippine films would be screened in theaters in Manila. It was set up in order to get Philippine films screened in "first-run" theaters which at that time only screened American films. Locally produced films prior to the film festival's first run was only screened at second-tier theaters.

The success of the Manila Film Festival led to the Philippine Motion Picture and Producers Association (PPMA) starting their own film festival in Manila as well as other cities in the Philippines such as Bacolod, Baguio, Cebu, Davao, and Iloilo. The PMPPA later established the successor event to the Manila Film Festival in 1975 through its then-president Joseph Estrada which was later known as the "Metro Manila Film Festival", which was set up with the approval of then-President Ferdinand Marcos Sr.

The Manila Film Festival was revived in 1991 by then-Mayor Mel Lopez. Just like before, it ran for 10 days starting on the foundation day of Manila on June 24. Some of its succeeding festivals would later start a few days earlier, such as the 1994 edition that became infamous for a cheating scandal that occurred during the awarding ceremonies on 22 June of that year. The Festival lasted until 2004.
