= Miss Mauritius =

Beauty pageant

Miss Mauritius National Organisation
- Formation: 1970
- Type: Beauty pageant
- Headquarters: Port Louis
- Location: Mauritius
- Members: Miss World; Miss International
- Official language: English
- Website: missmauritius.org

Miss Mauritius is a national beauty pageant held in Mauritius that selects representatives for Miss World and Miss International, two of the Big Four international beauty pageants.

== History ==
Miss Mauritius is the oldest beauty pageant in Mauritius, established in 1970 by Miss Mauritius National Organisation. The first Miss Mauritius was Florence Muller, who was crowned in 1970 and participated in Miss World 1970 in London, Great Britain. The first Miss Universe Mauritius, Nirmala Sohun, was crowned in 1975.

In 1970, Sir Seewoosagar Ramgoolam, Sir Gaetan Duval et Sir Veerasamy Ringadoo, have encouraged Mrs Primerose Obeegadoo to place Mauritius on the world map for fashion & beauty. Ever since, young Mauritian ladies have represented with pride Mauritius and its quadricolor flag at Miss World, Miss International, Miss European Union, Miss Intercontinental, Top Model of the World, Miss Tourism World, Miss Africa. Miss Mauritius National Organisation has many preliminary contests such as Elegance Award, Talent Award, Sport Award, Beach Beauty Award, Best Dress Award, Amity Award, Photogenic Award, Marketing Award and Multimedia Award.

== Titleholders ==
Year	Miss Mauritius	Notes
1970	Florence Muller	Miss World Mauritius
1971	Marie-Anne Ng Sik Kwong	Miss World Mauritius
1972	Marie Ange Bestel	Miss World Mauritius
1973	Daisy Ombrasine	Miss World Mauritius
1974	Nirmala Sohun	Miss Universe Mauritius
1975	Marielle Tse-Sik-Sun	Miss Universe/World Mauritius
1976	Danielle Marie Françoise Bouic	Miss Universe Mauritius
1977	Geneviève Chanea	Miss World Mauritius
1978	Maria Chanea Allard	Miss Universe/World Mauritius
1979	Christiane Carol Mackay	Miss World Mauritius
1980	Carole Fitzgerald	Did not compete
1986	Michelle Sylvie Geraldine Pastor	Miss World Mauritius
1987	Marie-Geraldine Mamet	Miss World Mauritius
1988	Jacky Randabel	Miss Universe Mauritius
1989	Anita Ramgutty	Miss Universe Mauritius
1990	Dhandevy Jeetun	Miss Universe Mauritius
1991	Stephanie Raymond	Miss Universe Mauritius
1992	Danielle Pascal	Miss Universe Mauritius
1993	Viveka Babajee†	Miss Universe/World Mauritius
1994	Marie Priscilla Mardaymootoo	Miss Universe/World Mauritius
1996	Cindy Cesar	Miss Universe Mauritius
1997	Leena Ramphul	Miss Universe Mauritius
1998	Oona Sujaya Fulena	Miss World Mauritius
1999	Micaella L'Hortalle	Miss Universe Mauritius
2000	Jenny Arthémidor	Miss Universe Mauritius
2001	Karen Alexandre	Miss Universe Mauritius
2002	Marie-Aimée Bergicourt	Miss Universe/World Mauritius
2003	Sabine Bourdet	Did not compete
2004	Marie-Natacha Magalie Antoo	Miss Universe/World Mauritius
2005	Isabelle Antoo	Miss Universe Mauritius
2006	Melody Selvon	Miss World Mauritius
2007	Olivia Carey	Miss Universe/World Mauritius
2008	Anaïs Veerapatren	Miss Universe/World Mauritius
2009	Dalysha Doorga	Miss Universe/World Mauritius
2010	Laetitia Darche	Miss Universe Mauritius
2011	Ameeksha Dilchand	Miss Universe/International Mauritius
2012	Diya Beeltah	Miss Universe Mauritius
2013	Pallavi Gungaram	Miss Universe Mauritius
2014	Kushboo Ramnawaj	Miss Universe Mauritius ― Withdrew at the Miss Universe 2015 pageant but due to personal reasons in December, but in 2016 she competed at Miss Universe 2016 under Estrella Mauritius (Miss Maurice organization)
2015	Danika Atchia	Miss Universe Mauritius ― Withdrew at Miss Universe 2016 after the Miss Universe franchise went to Miss Estrella Mauritius
2016	Bessika Bucktawor	Miss World Mauritius
2017	Anne Murielle Ravina	Miss World Mauritius
2018	Urvashi Gooriah	Miss World Mauritius
2019	Angélique Sanson	Miss World Mauritius
2020	Due to the impact of COVID-19 pandemic, no pageant in 2020	
2021	Due to the impact of COVID-19 pandemic, no pageant in 2020	
2022	Liza Gundowry	Miss World Mauritius
2023	Kimberly Joseph	Miss World Mauritius

== Mauritius at International pageants ==
=== Miss World Mauritius ===
- : Declared as Winner
- : Ended as runner-up or top 5/6 qualification
- : Ended as one of the finalists or semifinalists
- : Ended as special awards winner

Year	Miss World Mauritius	Placement at Miss World	Special Awards
2026	Shreeya Bokhoree	Unplaced	
2025	Kimberly Joseph	Unplaced	
2024	No competition held		
2023	Liza Gundowry	Top 12	
2022	Angélique Sanson	Unplaced	Miss World Talent (Top 27); Miss World Sport (Top 32)
Due to the impact of COVID-19 pandemic, no pageant between 2020 and 2021
2019	Urvashi Devi Gooriah	Unplaced	
2018	Anne Murielle Ravina	Top 12	Head-to-head challenge
2017	Bessika Bucktawor	Unplaced	
2016	Véronique Allas	Unplaced	

=== Miss International Mauritius ===
- : Declared as Winner
- : Ended as runner-up or top 5/6 qualification
- : Ended as one of the finalists or semifinalists
- : Ended as special awards winner

The second winner of Miss Mauritius will be competing at Miss International pageant.

Year	Miss International Mauritius	Placement at Miss International	Special Awards
2025	Naarmeen Bernon	TBA	
2024	Did not compete		
2023	Karishma Hurlall	Unplaced	
2022	Ava Memero	Unplaced	
Due to the impact of COVID-19 pandemic, no pageants between 2020 and 2021
2019	Nidishwaree Ruchpaul	Unplaced	
2018	Ashna Nookooloo	Unplaced	
2017	Marie-Désirée Sabrina Laetitia Bègue	Unplaced	
2016	Shavina Hulka	Unplaced	
