= Anaïs Veerapatren =

Mauritian former model (born 1986)

- Born: Anaïs Veerapatren; June 26, 1986 (age 39); Port Louis, Mauritius
- Height: 1.80 m (5 ft 11 in)
- Beauty pageant titleholder
- Hair color: Black
- Eye color: Brown

Anaïs Veerapatren (born 26 June 1986) is a Mauritian former model and beauty pageant titleholder who was crowned Miss Mauritius 2009, and came third in the Miss East Africa competition the same year. Veerapatren represented Mauritius at the Miss Universe 2009 pageant in the Bahamas on August 23, 2009. She ended up among the 10 Best Top Models and Top 3 Interviews. She participated in Miss World 2009 pageant in South Africa and made it among the finalists of the Talent Competition for singing. Anais competed in Miss International 2010 in Chengdu, China where she received the award of Miss International Goodwill Ambassador. She also participated in other pageants like Top Model of the World in 2014.

Anaïs has lived in France since 2013.
