= Sheila Bappoo =

Mauritian politician

Sheila Bappoo GOSK
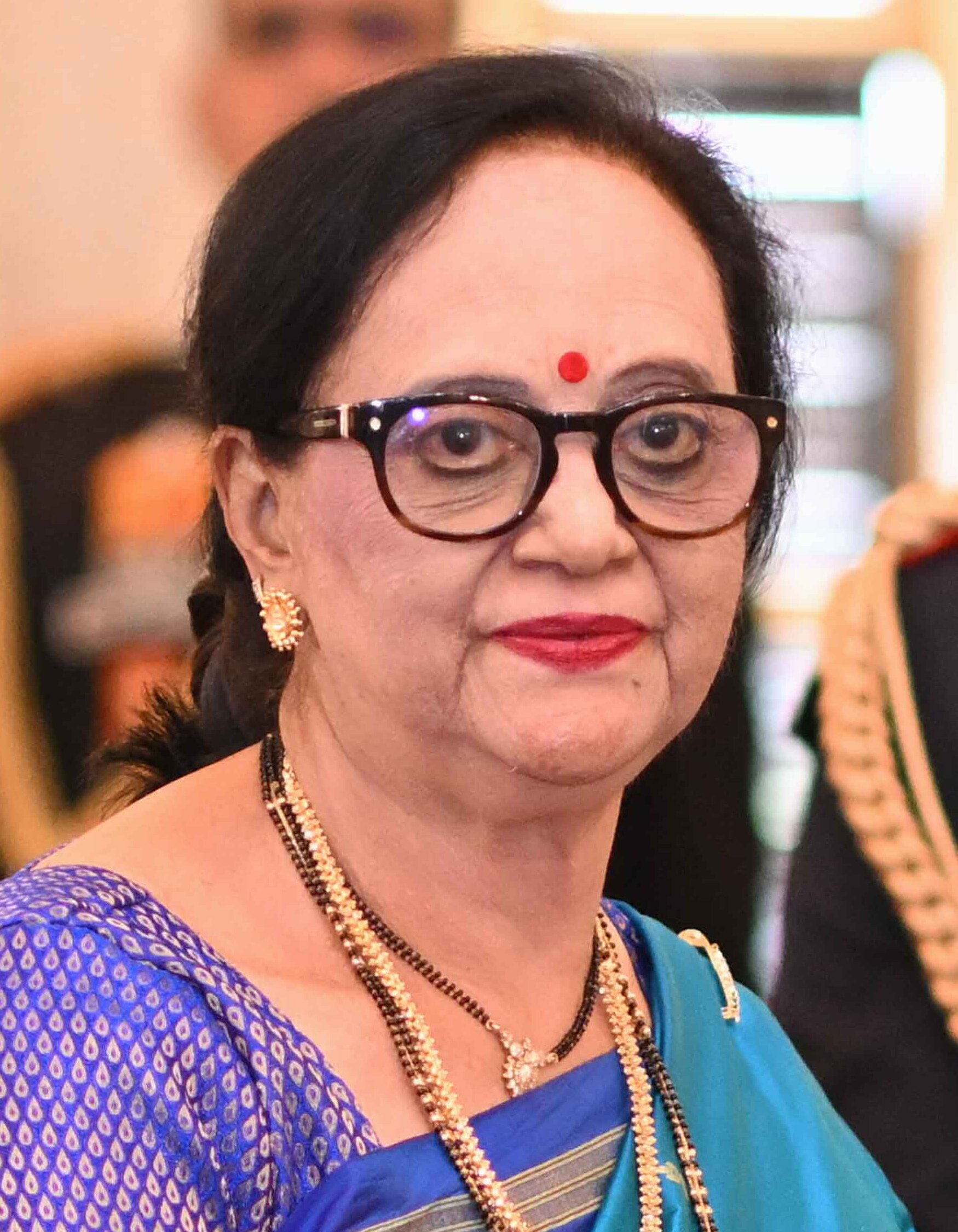
- Bappoo in 2025

High Commissioner of Mauritius to India
- Incumbent
- Assumed office 11 July 2025
- Appointed by: Dharam Gokhool
- Preceded by: Haymandoyal Dillum

Minister of Social Security, National Solidarity and Reform Institutions Social Security, National Solidarity and Senior Citizens Welfare and Reform Institutions (2000–2005)
- In office 18 August 2011 – 13 December 2014
- Prime Minister: Navin Ramgoolam
- Preceded by: Leela Dookun-Luchoomun
- Succeeded by: Fazila Jeewa-Daureeawoo
- In office 5 July 2005 – 11 May 2010
- Prime Minister: Navin Ramgoolam
- Preceded by: Sam Lauthan
- Succeeded by: Leela Dookun-Luchoomun (Social Security, National Solidarity and Reform Institutions)

Minister of Gender Equality, Child Development and Family Welfare Women's Rights and Family Welfare (1983–1986)
- In office 11 May 2010 – 18 August 2011
- Prime Minister: Navin Ramgoolam
- Preceded by: Indranee Seebun
- Succeeded by: Mireille Martin
- In office 27 August 1983 – 5 July 1995
- Prime Minister: Anerood Jugnauth
- Preceded by: Shirin Aumeeruddy-Cziffra
- Succeeded by: Indira Thacoor-Sidaya

Personal details
- Born: 16 June 1947 (age 79) Beau Bassin, Mauritius
- Party: Militant Socialist Movement; Labour Party
- Occupation: Teacher

Sheilabai Bappoo GOSK (née Rama; born 16 June 1947) is a Mauritius politician and diplomat. She served as Minister of Social Security, National Solidarity and Senior Citizens Welfare & Reform Institutions in Mauritius from 2005 to 2010. She also held the ministry of Gender Equality, Child Protection and Family Planning from 1983 to 1995 and from 2010 to 2011.

== Biography ==
Sheila Bappoo completed her graduation in teaching from Queen Elizabeth College. She was a teacher until 1977.

She was a leader of the Mauritian Militant Movement and was General-Secretary of the party until 1975. She decided to step down in favor of Anerood Jugnauth, who went on to become the President. Bapoo was elected councilor of Beau-Bassin & Rose-Hill where she was appointed as Deputy Mayor in 1977.

The split in her party created a rift between the new Prime Minister Anerood Jugnauth and the leader of the party Berenger. In 1983 they finally announced the termination of their alliance. Jugnauth proposed the creation of a new party sister to the MMM with the members who disagreed with Berenger, one of them was Bappoo. She finally merged with Jugnauth in the new party called the Militant Socialist Movement (MSM). The party won the elections of 1983. Jugnauth remained Prime Minister with a new team along with Bappoo as Minister of Women's Right.

In 1996 Rama Sithanen, Alain Laridon and Sheila Bappoo formed a new party named Rally for Reform or Rassemblement Pour la Réforme (RPR). The RPR allied with PMSD for the municipal elections, going on to win 25% of the votes. From 1991 to 1995, she served as the Minister for Women's Rights, Child Development and Family Welfare.

She joined MSM in 2003 and subsequently served as the Minister of Labour and Industrial Relations and Women's Rights, Child Development and Family Welfare. She was elected again in Constituency No 16 as from July 2005 to date, under the banner of Labour Party, Social Alliance.

At the 2005 elections she was candidate for the Labour Party (Mauritius) with the Alliance Sociale coalition Alliance Sociale (PTR–PMXD–LVF–MR–MMSM) and was elected at Constituency No. 16. At the subsequent elections in 2010 she was again elected in the same Constituency under the banner of Labour Party (coalition of PTR-PMSD-MSM). From July 2005 to 11 May 2010, she held the ministry of Social Security, National Solidarity and Senior Citizens Welfare & Reform Institutions. Her portfolio was changed to Gender Equality, Child Development and Family Welfare on 11 May 2010 and she continued till 7 August 2011.

On 18 August 2011, she became the Minister of Social Security, National Solidarity and Reforms Institutions Welfare.

On 15 March 2015, Sheila Bappoo withdrew from politics.

== Scandals ==
=== 2012 cover up of paedophilia at MITD ===
As Minister of Social Security in 2012, Sheila Bappoo figured in the US Department of State annual Country Report on Human Rights Practices for persecuting Pravind Jugnauth. Provisional charges of sedition were laid against the latter following Bappoo's complaint, but police failed to promptly provide Jugnauth with details of these charges. This followed a press conference held at the Sun Trust on 22 December 2012 during which Jugnauth decried minister Bappoo's lack of action after news broke out about a pedophilia scandal at the Mauritius Institute of Training and Development (MITD). In fact, the MITD fitness instructor Narain Chedumbrum (Rishi) was accused of having sexual relationships with a 14 year-old student. His wife, Preety Sham Chedumbrum, also reported that Narain had pressured her to change her previous affidavits which detailed the sexual relationship.

== Awards ==
- 2007: Grand Officer of the Order of the Star and Key of the Indian Ocean and set eligible to use post-nominal (GOSK).
