= Women in Mauritius =

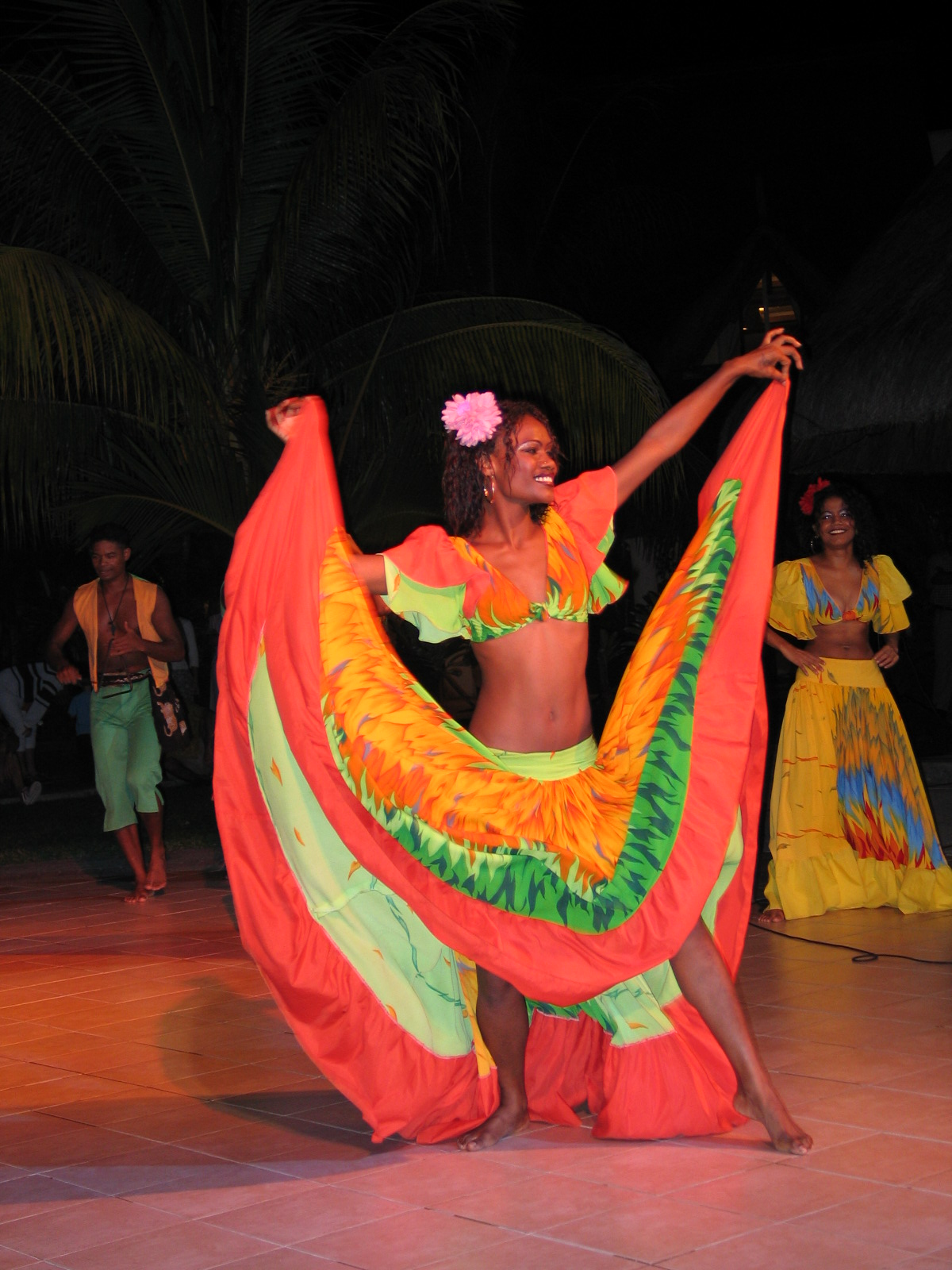
- Two female Sega music dancers (center and right) from Mauritius.

General statistics
- Maternal mortality (per 100,000): 53 (2020)
- Women in parliament: 20% (2020)
- Women over 25 with secondary education: 45.2% (2010)
- Women in labour force: 50% (2018)

Gender Inequality Index
- Value: 0.347 (2021)
- Rank: 82nd out of 191

Global Gender Gap Index
- Value: 0.679 (2022)
- Rank: 105th out of 146

Women in Mauritius refers to the social demographic of women in Mauritius. Women's role in Mauritian society changed throughout the 20th century. Historically, Mauritian culture maintained patriarchal power structures, in domains inclusive of family and work life. Women's contribution in the workforce increased due to the creation of 'Export Processing Zone', by the Mauritian Government. This shift resulted in a surge in 'dual-earner' and working single-mother households.

Furthermore, in 2008, Mauritius established the Employment Rights Act. The Act forbids discrimination within the workplace and stipulates equal remuneration for work of equal value. Both females and males, regardless of their marital status, have the legal right to choose their own profession, in Civil Code and under The Act.

== Parliament ==
In the postcolonial era, women in Mauritius experienced the impacts of colonialism. During the 19th-century Mauritian law stated that women should be treated as the inalienable property of their husbands. The government then repealed laws that they view deal with inheritance and emigration. In 1989, the government appointed equal opportunity officers in the principal ministries for issues related to women. The Ministry of Women's Rights and Family Welfare reports indicate some improvement in issues relating to discrimination.

Some developments in Parliament include Mrs Ameena Gurib-Fakhim accession to the presidency (from 2015 to 2018), as well as, Hon.Mrs Maya Hanoomanjee's attainment of the position of the first woman Speaker in 2014.

== Events ==
In 2016, the Ministry of Gender Equality requested the withdrawal of an advertisement by Coca-Cola which was considered "sexist" due to a complaint from a gender consultant. In March 2018, a new law was established to form the National Women’s Council as a platform for women to voice out their needs and aspirations. In order to address issues like violence against women, trafficking of women, and the promotion and protection of rights to sexuality and sexual and reproductive health, in May 2018, a joint monitoring framework agreement on the gender action plan was signed with the European Union.

== Indices of Development ==
=== Economic ===
In Mauritius, working age females (15+) have an unemployment rate of 10%. The percentage of women in senior positions, such as: Senior Chief Executive, Permanent Secretary and Deputy Permanent Secretary, increased from 23% in 2001 to 40% in 2016. The international conference in August 2018, produced a declaration on women’s economic empowerment in addition to a work plan on the priority areas of the Indian Rim Association to significantly contribute to women’s economic empowerment.

=== Education ===
The proportion of students progressing from primary cycle to secondary cycle in 2011 was 79% for boys and 84% for girls.

=== Gender ===
In 2013, Mauritius' Gender Inequality Index was 0.375. According to Ms. Jeewa-Daureeawoo, it has been stated Mauritius is on the right track to eliminating discrimination against women.

== See also ==
- Women in Africa
