= Miss Tourism World =

Beauty pageant in Great Britain and China

- Great Britain & China logos
- Formation: United Kingdom–1991; 35 years ago; China–2016; 10 years ago
- Type: Beauty pageant
- Headquarters: United Kingdom–Miss Tourism World®; China–Miss Tourism World©
- Official language: English, Chinese
- Key people: United Kingdom; John David Singh
- Website: MTW UK Official Website; MTW China Official Website

Miss Tourism World is an annual international beauty pageant with two distinct organizations, one established in Great Britain in 1991 and another founded in China in 2016.

The current titleholder of Miss Tourism World 2022, a Great Britain-based pageant, is Erina Hanawa from Japan, who was crowned on 10 December 2022, in Ho Chi Minh City, Vietnam.

The current titleholder of Miss Tourism World 2025, a China-based pageant, is Karolina Piksa from Poland. She was crowned in Changde, China.

== History ==
=== Based in Great Britain ===
Miss Tourism World was initially established as an international beauty pageant in 1991 in Great Britain. The organization was acquired by David Singh in 2008. Due to various factors, the pageant was not held in the following years: 1993, 1996, 1998–1999, 2004, 2006, 2008–2011, 2016–2017, and 2020–2021.

During the most recent edition of MTW, Erina Hanawa from Japan was crowned Miss Tourism World 2022 on 10 December in Vĩnh Phúc province, Vietnam. This makes her the second Japanese woman to win the title.

=== Based in China ===
Established in China in 2016 as Miss City Tourism Champion, the pageant has been held annually since 2017 under the name Miss Tourism World, with its international finale billed as Miss Tourism World - Global Finals. In January 2019, the organization also held a separate spin-off edition, Miss Tourism World - Intercontinental 2019, in Nanjing, China, where the title was awarded to Francesca Taruc of the Philippines.

The most recent competition, Miss Tourism World - Global 2025, was held in Changde, China, on 2 October 2025, where the title was awarded to Karolina Piksa of Poland.

== Background ==
Miss Tourism and the Miss Tourism World Tour hold annual competitions to promote global tourism. The Miss Tourism World Organization brings together contestants and titleholders from various countries in a selected host nation to participate in Miss Tourism World, a well-established pageant centred on tourism. Contestants produce tourism videos, showcased during the final event, to spotlight destinations and encourage tourism.

The Miss Tourism World Organization's primary goal is to promote tourism through its participants. It offers international visibility for the host country, aiming to attract tourists, boost foreign revenue, and support local communities by presenting the country as a travel destination.

=== Format ===
The Miss Tourism World pageant includes titles such as Miss Tourism World Africa, Asia, Americas, Europe, and Oceania. These continental titles provide a platform for host countries to present their cultural and tourism concepts to a broader audience, including the youth.

Contestants participate in segments such as evening gown, swimsuit, and national costume presentations. The Miss Tourism World pageant has been hosted across four continents, allowing participants to compete for both the overall title and their respective continental crowns. The national costume segment is mandatory, with the Best National Costume Award presented to one contestant during the finale.

== Titleholders ==
Based in Great Britain (since 1992)

Year	Country/Territory	Titleholder	Venue	Entrants
1992	Argentina	Andrea Ramon	Oranjestad, Aruba	–
1994	Venezuela	Monica Montenegro Prosperi	Oranjestad, Aruba	20
1995	Philippines	Suzanne Park Fahling	Santo Domingo, Dominican Republic	23
1997	Colombia	Maria Mercedes Ruiz Orozco	Santo Domingo, Dominican Republic	24
2000	Venezuela	Francys Barraza Sudnicka	St. Paul's Bay, Malta	48
2001	Croatia	Anita Dujic	Medellín, Colombia	59
2002	Philippines	Michelle C Reyes	Ankara, Turkey	62
2003	Romania	Alina Ciorogariu	Valencia, Venezuela	45
2005	Czech Republic	Zuzana Putnarova	Harare, Zimbabwe	86
2007	Moldova	Ecaterina Sau	Antalya, Turkey	59
2012	Russia	Tatyana Maksimova	Bangkok, Thailand	58
2013	Venezuela	Beronika Martinez	Malabo, Equatorial Guinea	51
2014	Japan	Tomomi Kondou	Barquisimeto, Venezuela	28
2015	Thailand	Nuchnarin Sinlaparak	Malacca City, Malaysia	48
2018	Colombia	Andrea Katherine Gutierrez Puentes	Kuala Lumpur, Malaysia	51
2019	Australia	Juliana Nikols	Poreč, Croatia	37
2022	Japan	Erina Hanawa	Ho Chi Minh, Vietnam	35

Based in China (since 2016)

Year	Country/Territory	Titleholder	Venue	Entrants
2016	Greece	Katerina Bosklaviti	Taizhou, Zhejiang, China	35
2017	Ukraine	Beatriks Mindak	Ordos City, China	62
2018	Russia	Marina Oreshkina	Hanzhong, China	59
2019	Mexico	Michelle Hewitt Zapata	Qingdao, China	30
2023	Czech Republic	Karolina Gorylová	Quanzhou, China	60
2024	Brazil	Isabelle Queiroz Bartoli	Guangdong, China	62
2025	Poland	Karolina Piksa	Changde, China	70

== Countries by number of wins ==
Based in Great Britain (since 1992)
Based in China (since 2016)

Country/Territory	Titles	Year(s)
Venezuela	3	1994, 2000, 2013
Japan	2	2014, 2022
Colombia	2	1997, 2018
Philippines	2	1995, 2002
Australia	1	2019
Thailand	1	2015
Russia	1	2012
Moldova	1	2007
Czech Republic	1	2005
Romania	1	2003
Croatia	1	2001
Argentina	1	1992

Country/Territory	Titles	Year(s)
Poland	1	2025
Brazil	1	2024
Czech Republic	1	2023
Mexico	1	2019
Russia	1	2018
Ukraine	1	2017
Greece	1	2016

== List of runners-up ==
=== Based in Great Britain ===
Year	Runners-up			
Year	First	Second	Third	Fourth
1993	Jolanda Janssen; Aruba	Tania Collazo; Puerto Rico	Not Awarded	
1994	unknown infofmation Belgium	unknown information Colombia	Not Awarded	
1995	Yovana Soraya Grisales Castañeda; Colombia	Mildred Altagarcia Quiroz Abreu; Dominican Republic	Yoseany Miglenis Finol Leidenz; Venezuela	Alejandra Paz Toledo; Guatemala
1997	Roisland Morovick; Russia	Sabina Beck; Germany	Not Awarded	
2000	Renata Voitchovskaja; Lithuania	Rachel Soriano; Philippines	Not Awarded	
2001	Vanessa Fanessi; Venezuela	Petra Kasparaviciute; Lithuania	Not Awarded	
2002	Didem Kovanci; Turkey	Darjana Iljkic; Croatia	Not Awarded	
2003	Nancy Valeria Randall; Brazil	Dignelis Taymi Jimenez Hernandez; Puerto Rico	Jerusalem Ketema; Ethiopia	Jessica Maria Jardim Lino; Venezuela
2005	Raquel Balancia Alonso; Spain	Oslie Muringal; Zimbabwe	Alexandra Oliynyk; Ukraine	Shirley Alero Aghotse; Nigeria
2007	Aimee Melo Hernandez; Dominican Republic	Asel Mamytbaeva; Kyrgyzstan	Caroline Marufu; Zimbabwe	Emilia Rusu; Romania
2012	Purva Rana; India	Nadina Abdel Aziz; Lebanon	Not Awarded	
2013	Hillary Ondo; Gabon	Michaela Haladova; Czech Republic	Andrea Huisgen; Spain	Olena Popova; Ukraine
2014	Ana Marquez Vera; Spain	Ashley Powell; Great Britain	Fernanda Rocha Lemes; Brazil	Jelena Katarina Kapa; Croatia
2015	Yoselin Noroña; Ecuador	Karen Aliberti; Venezuela	Sara Stojanovic; Serbia	Shelby Tribble; Great Britain
2018	Janick Maceta del Castillo; Peru	Sara Miletic; Serbia	Lynn Hsin Goh; Malaysia	Toru Amirlin; Mongolia
2019	Karina Pochwala; Poland	Nina-Marie Kallo; Finland	Fulya Tilki; Northern Cyprus	Anita Ayebare; Uganda
2022	Justine Felizarta; Philippines	Le Thi Huong Ly; Vietnam	Yulia Pavlikova; Russia	Adeduro Tosin Adetola; Nigeria

=== Based in China ===
Year	Runners-up			
Year	First	Second	Third	Fourth
2016	– Czech Republic	Teeyapar Setthasirisuwan; Thailand	– Argentina	– Venezuela
2017	Paula Joseane Lima Dos Santos; Brazil	Marcela Evelyn Balik; Australia	Charattha Pitakbut; Thailand	Yohana Hidalgo; Peru
2018	Nikol Pracharova; Czech Republic	Chalisa Asavalikitsom; Thailand	Kaina Sokaina; Morocco	Park So-jeong; South Korea
2019	Svetlana Mamaeva; Canada	Tan Ruoyi; China	– Brazil	– Sweden
2023	Andrea Nikolic; Montenegro	Liu Jia; China	Not Awarded	
2024	Kaja Tomaszewska; Poland	Wu Ruihan 吴睿涵 Taiwan	Pornniphat Sonsakha; Thailand	Arianna Andrea Santoyo Cordova; Peru
2025	Bruna Seitz; Brazil	Tereza Langrova; Czech Republic	Bisera Cuculova; North Macedonia	Zhang Shihan; China

== See also ==
- List of beauty pageants
