= Laetitia Darche =

Belgian-born Mauritian model

- Born: Laetitia Darche; 22 June 1991 (age 35); Uccle, Belgium
- Occupation: Model
- Height: 1.67 m (5 ft 5 1/2 in)
- Beauty pageant titleholder
- Title: Miss Mauritius 2010
- Hair color: Black
- Eye color: Dark brown
- Major competitions: Elite Model Look Mauritius 2009 (1st runner-up) (Prix spécial du jury); Miss Mauritius 2010 (Winner); Miss Universe 2011; Miss Intercontinental 2011 (top 15)

Laetitia Sauzier (née Darche, born 22 June 1991) is a Belgian-Mauritian model and beauty pageant titleholder. She was the winner of the Miss Mauritius 2010 beauty pageant.

== Early life ==
Born in Uccle to Belgian father Michel and Mauritian mother Jacqueline, Darche spent her first three years of life in Mauritius. Her family then moved to Spain for ten years and to Belgium for the next five, where she would enjoy visiting her grandmother Rachelle in Jodoigne.

Darche speaks French, Spanish, English, Flemish and Mauritian Creole. She started her modeling career at age 16 and participated in Elite Model Look Mauritius 2009, where she obtained the Prix spécial du jury and finished second overall.

Prior to competing in Miss Mauritius, Darche was pursuing a bachelor's degree in sociology and economics at Paris-Sorbonne University and worked as a model doing photo shoots in France.

== Miss Mauritius 2010 ==
Darche competed as one of 14 finalists in her country's national beauty pageant, Miss Mauritius, held on 25 September 2010 in Bel Ombre, where she became the eventual winner of the title, gaining the right to represent Mauritius in Miss Universe 2011 and Miss World 2011.

== Miss Universe 2011 ==
Time magazine reckoned the dress worn by Laetitia Darche, as one of the worst for the Miss Universe 2011 competition. Time magazine described it as toilet paper for the curtains hanging on her arms.

== Personal life ==
Laetitia Darche married Maxime Sauzier on 3 August 2012 at Cap Malheureux. Her wedding dress was made by Mauritian stylist/designer Alexandra Juglall, who did a unique model for this occasion. The wedding seems to have ended however.

Awards and achievements
Preceded by Dalysha Doorga	Miss Mauritius; 2010	Succeeded by Ameeksha Dilchand
