= Pallavi Gungaram =

- Born: Pallavi Gungaram; 15 December 1993 (age 32); Vacoas, Mauritius
- Education: University of Mauritius
- Height: 1.65 m (5 ft 5 in)
- Beauty pageant titleholder
- Title: Miss Mauritius 2013
- Hair color: Black
- Eye color: Black
- Major competitions: Miss Mauritius 2013 (Winner); Miss Universe 2014 (Unplaced)

Pallavi Gungaram (born 15 December 1993), also known as Pallavi Ram, is a Mauritian beauty pageant titleholder who was crowned Miss Mauritius 2013, and represented her country at the Miss Universe 2014 pageant. Pallavi Gungaram made her debut as an actor in the independent movie Ocracoke, released in early 2021.

== Early life ==
Pallavi Gungaram is currently doing her bachelor of science (honors) in psychology at the University of Mauritius as well as her diploma in yoga at the IGCIC.

== Pageantry ==
=== Miss Mauritius 2013 ===
Pallavi Gungaram is the new Miss Mauritius 2013. The ceremony was held on June 29, 2013, at Johnson & Johnson Auditorium in Vacoas-Phoenix.

=== Miss Universe 2014 ===
Pallavi represented Mauritius at Miss Universe 2014 but was Unplaced at the pageant.
