= Mauritians =

Citizens or residents of Mauritius

- Flag of Mauritius

Total population
- c. 1.6 million (Mauritian ancestry and citizenship worldwide)

Regions with significant populations
- Mauritius: 1.3 million
- France: 46,200 (Including those naturalised French but excluding Mauritians born abroad)
- United Kingdom: 43,000 (2020 estimate)
- Australia: 24,329
- Canada: 15,900
- South Africa: 14,043
- Belgium: 8,584
- Italy: 7,400
- Madagascar: 4,300
- Sri Lanka: 4,100
- Ireland: 3,200
- Seychelles: 1,000
- Luxembourg: 1,000
- New Zealand: 693
- Kenya: 500
- Norway: 160
- Japan: 112
- Denmark: 100
- Taiwan: 22
- Brazil: 1000

Languages
- Mauritian Creole; French; English; Mauritian Bhojpuri; other Indian languages; Chinese languages

Religion
- Predominantly: Hinduism 47.9% Minority: Christianity 32.3% Minority: Islam 18.2% Minority: Others / none 1.6%

Mauritians (singular Mauritian; French: Mauricien; Creole: Morisien) are nationals of the Republic of Mauritius and their descendants. Given its geographic location and colonial past, the people of Mauritius are diverse in ethnicity, culture, language and faith. Indo-Mauritians make up the bulk of the population with significant Creole, Sino-Mauritian and Franco-Mauritian minorities.

The population is further divided into linguistic and religious categories. Mauritians having their roots from the Bhojpuri and Hindustani speaking regions of India account for around half the total population with significant Indo-Mauritian minorities from the Tamil, Telugu and Marathi speaking regions of the subcontinent.

Creole Mauritians of African descent trace their roots to East Africa and Madagascar, thus with distant Austronesian ancestry, Chinese Mauritians have mostly Cantonese and Hakka ancestries while White Mauritians are mostly from France.

It is the only country in Africa where Hinduism is the most practised religion with significant Christian and Muslim minorities.

Since 1995, it is no longer possible to acquire Mauritian citizenship, automatically by birth, if one was born in Mauritius of foreign parents. A person born outside Mauritius is a citizen of Mauritius under section 20(3) and 23 of the Constitution if either of their parents is a citizen of Mauritius by birth. Thus, children born to Mauritians who were themselves born abroad are denied automatic citizenship.

== History ==
Mauritian Creoles trace their origins to the plantation owners and slaves who were brought to work the sugar fields. When slavery was abolished on 1 February 1835, an attempt was made to secure a cheap source of adaptable labour for intensive sugar plantations in Mauritius. Indentured labour began with Indian, Chinese, Malay, African and Malagasy labourers, but ultimately, it was India which supplied the much needed labourers to Mauritius, mainly sugar cane workers. This period of intensive use of Indian labour took place during British rule, with many brutal episodes and a long struggle by the indentured for respect. The term applied to the indentured during this period, and which has since become a derogatory term for Mauritians of Asian descent, was coolie. The island soon became the key-point in the trade of indentured labourers, as thousands of Indians set forth from Calcutta or Karikal; not only did they modify the social, political and economic physiognomies of the island, but some also went farther, to the West Indies.

Indo-Mauritians are descended from Indian immigrants who arrived in the 19th century via the Aapravasi Ghat in order to work as indentured labourers after slavery was abolished in 1835. Included in the Indo-Mauritian community are Hindus (48.5% of the Mauritian population) and Muslims (17.2%) from the Indian subcontinent. The Franco-Mauritian elite controlled nearly all of the large sugar estates and was active in business and banking. As the Indian population became numerically dominant after independence from British rule and the voting franchise was extended, political and economic power shifted from the Franco-Mauritians and their Creole allies to the Indo-Mauritians.

The meeting of a mosaic of people from Europe, India, Africa and China began a process of hybridisation and intercultural frictions and dialogues, which poet Khal Torabully has termed "coolitude". This social reality is a major reference for identity opened to otherness and is widely used in Mauritius where it represents a humanism of diversity.

Subsequent to a Constitutional amendment in 1982, there is no need for Mauritians to reveal their ethnic identities for the purpose of population census. Official statistics on ethnicity are not available. The 1972 census was the last one to measure ethnicity. Statistics Mauritius compiles data on religious affiliation every ten years during census.

== Demographics of Mauritius ==
Ethnic groups of Mauritius
Ethnic group	Percent of population
Indo-Mauritian	67%
Creoles	28%
Sino-Mauritian	3%
Franco-Mauritian	2%

Ethnic groups of Mauritius
Ethnic group	% of population
Indo-Mauritians	67%
Afro-Mauritians	28%
Sino-Mauritians	3%
Franco-Mauritians	2%

== Mauritian diaspora ==
The Mauritian diaspora consists of Mauritian emigrants and their descendants in various countries around the world, mainly Great Britain (United Kingdom), Australia, New Zealand, Canada, France, Ireland and Belgium.

Given the island's importance for international shipping routes and limited opportunities locally, Mauritians settled internationally before some of these countries were founded as nations. For example, Mauritians settled on the continent of Australia before federation of the nation. Their ancestors and more recent migrants are now known as Mauritian Australians.

== See also ==
- Demographics of Mauritius
- List of Mauritians
- Jean-Raymond Boulle
