= History of Mauritius =

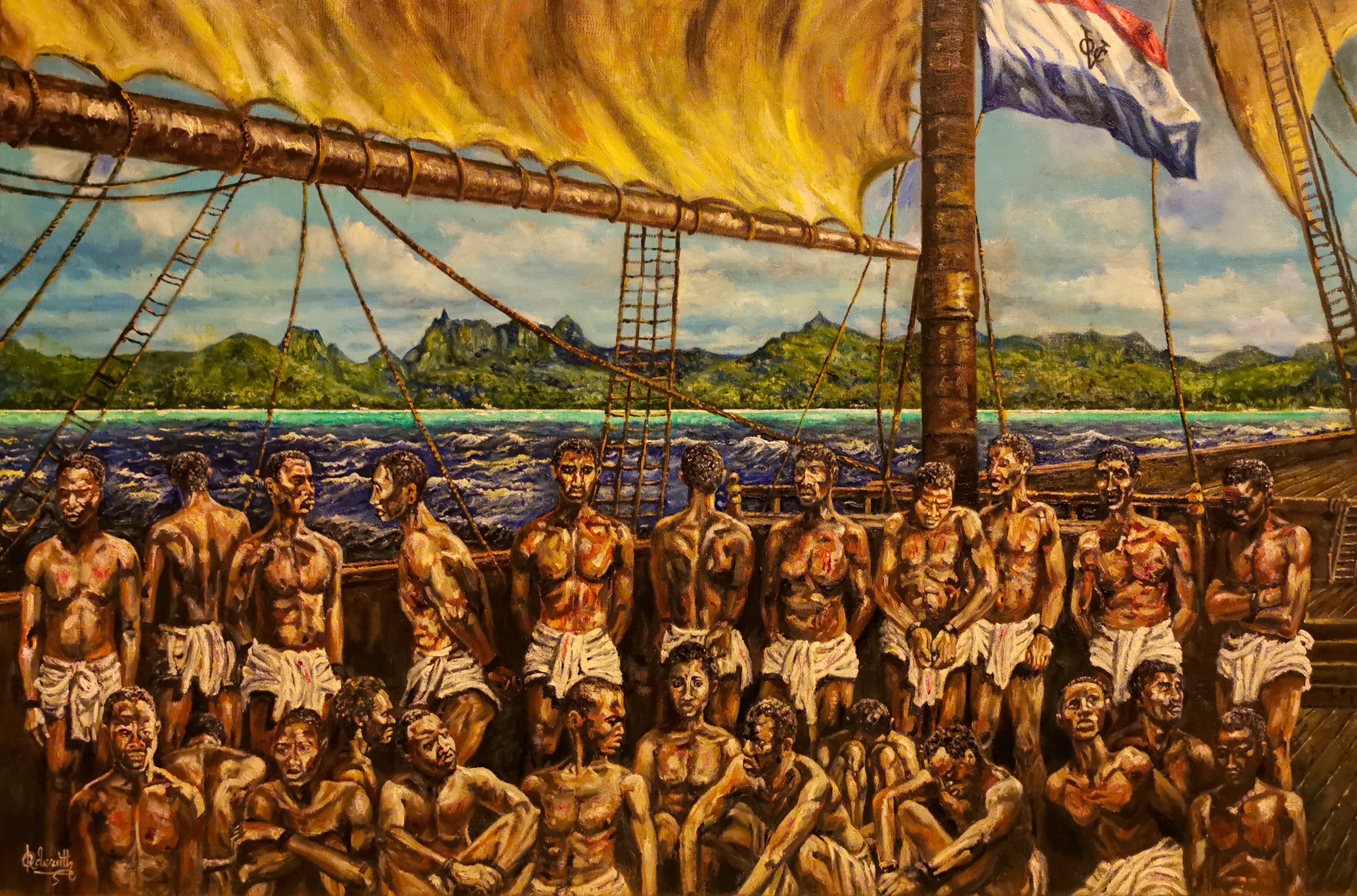
First African slaves to Mauritius. Artist: Raouf Oderuth

The recorded history of Mauritius begins with discovery by Portuguese and thus its appearance on European maps in the early 16th century. Mauritius was successively colonized by the Netherlands, France and Great Britain, and became independent on 12 March 1968.

== Discovery ==
Mauritius was first officially discovered by the Portuguese, as corroborated by Portuguese. This is evident in the earliest existing historical evidence of the island on the Cantino Planisphere, which shows three islands that represent the Mascarenes (Réunion, Mauritius and Rodrigues) and calls them Dina Margabin, Dina Arobi, and Dina Moraze. It also shows the Cargados Carajos shoals (St. Brandon) as baixos (shallows). The medieval Arab world called the Indian Ocean island region Waqwaq.

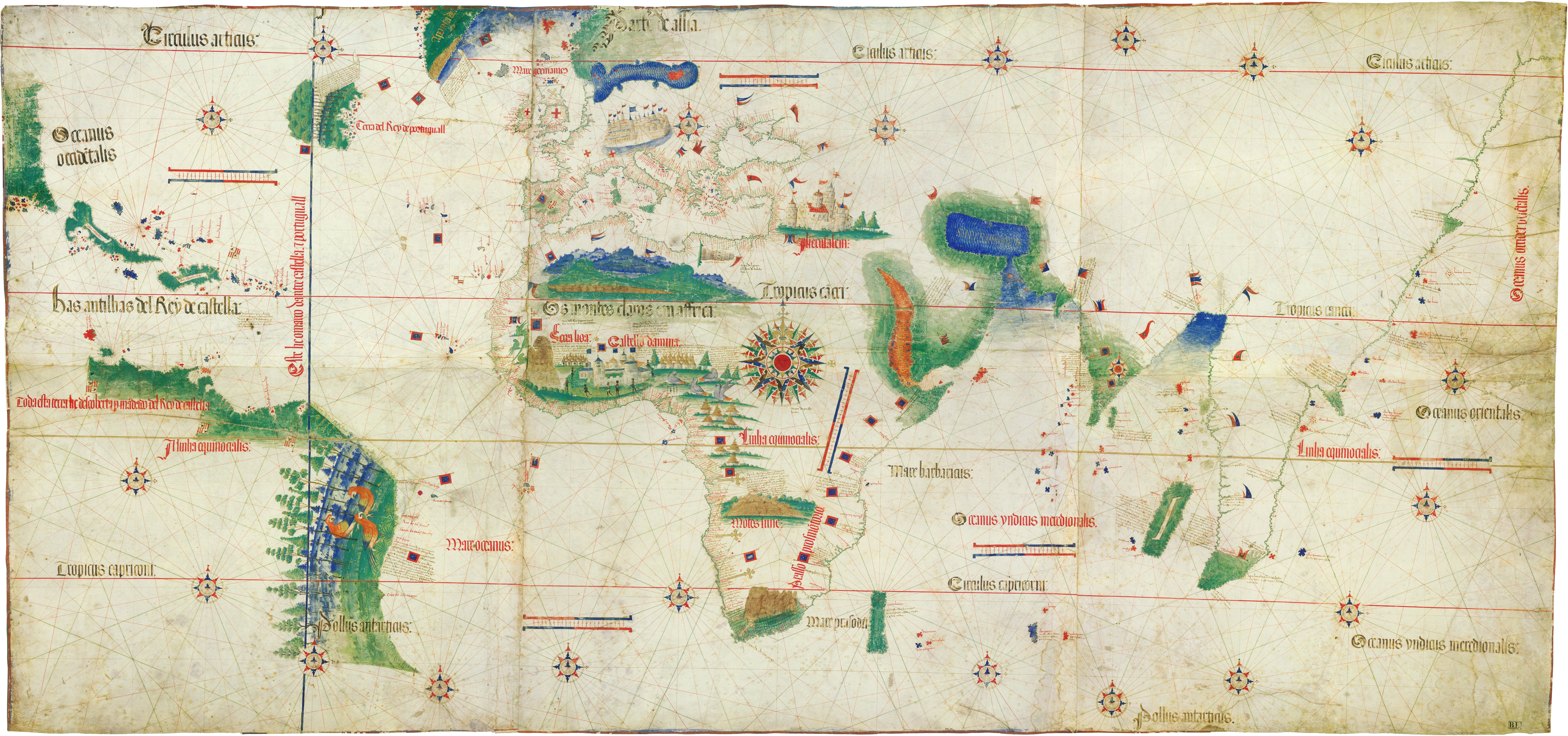
Cantino planisphere (1502), Biblioteca Estense, Modena, Italy

== Portuguese discoveries (1507–1513) ==
Mauritius was later rediscovered and visited by the Portuguese between 1507 and 1513. Mauritius and surrounding islands were known as the Mascarene Islands (Ilhas Mascarenhas) after Pedro Mascarenhas

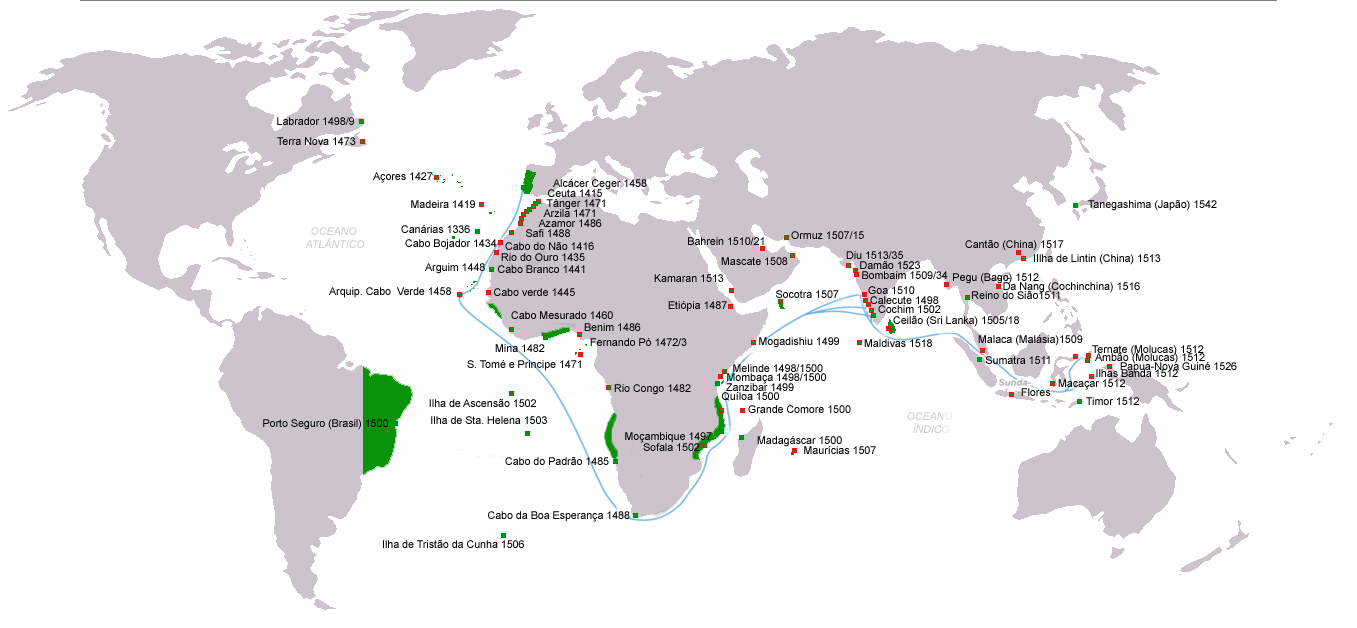
Portuguese discoveries 1415–1543 in the reign of John III (green)

An official world map by Diogo Ribeiro described "from west to east, the first island, 'Mascarenhas', the second, 'Santa Apolonia' and the third, 'Domingo Froiz.' " The three islands (Réunion, Mauritius and Rodrigues) were encountered some years earlier by chance during an exploratory expedition of the coast of the Bay of Bengal led by Tristão da Cunha. The expedition ran into a cyclone and was forced to change course. Thus, the ship Cirne of the captain Diogo Fernandes Pereira, came into view of Réunion island on 9 February 1507. They called the island "Santa Apolonia" ("Saint Apollonia") in honor of that day's saint. Mauritius was encountered during the same expedition and received the name of "Cirne" and Rodrigues that of "Diogo Rodrigues". Five years later, the islands were visited by Pedro Mascarenhas. who left the name "Mascarene" for the whole region. The Portuguese took no interest in these isolated islands. They were already established in Asia in Goa, on the coast of Malabar, on the island of Ceylon (now Sri Lanka) and on the coast of what is presently known as Malaysia

Their main African base was in Mozambique, therefore the Portuguese navigators preferred to use the Mozambique Channel to go to India. The Comoros to the north proved to be a more practical port of call. Thus no permanent colony was established on the island by the Portuguese

== Dutch East India Company era (1598–1710) ==
VOC (Logo of the Dutch East India Company)

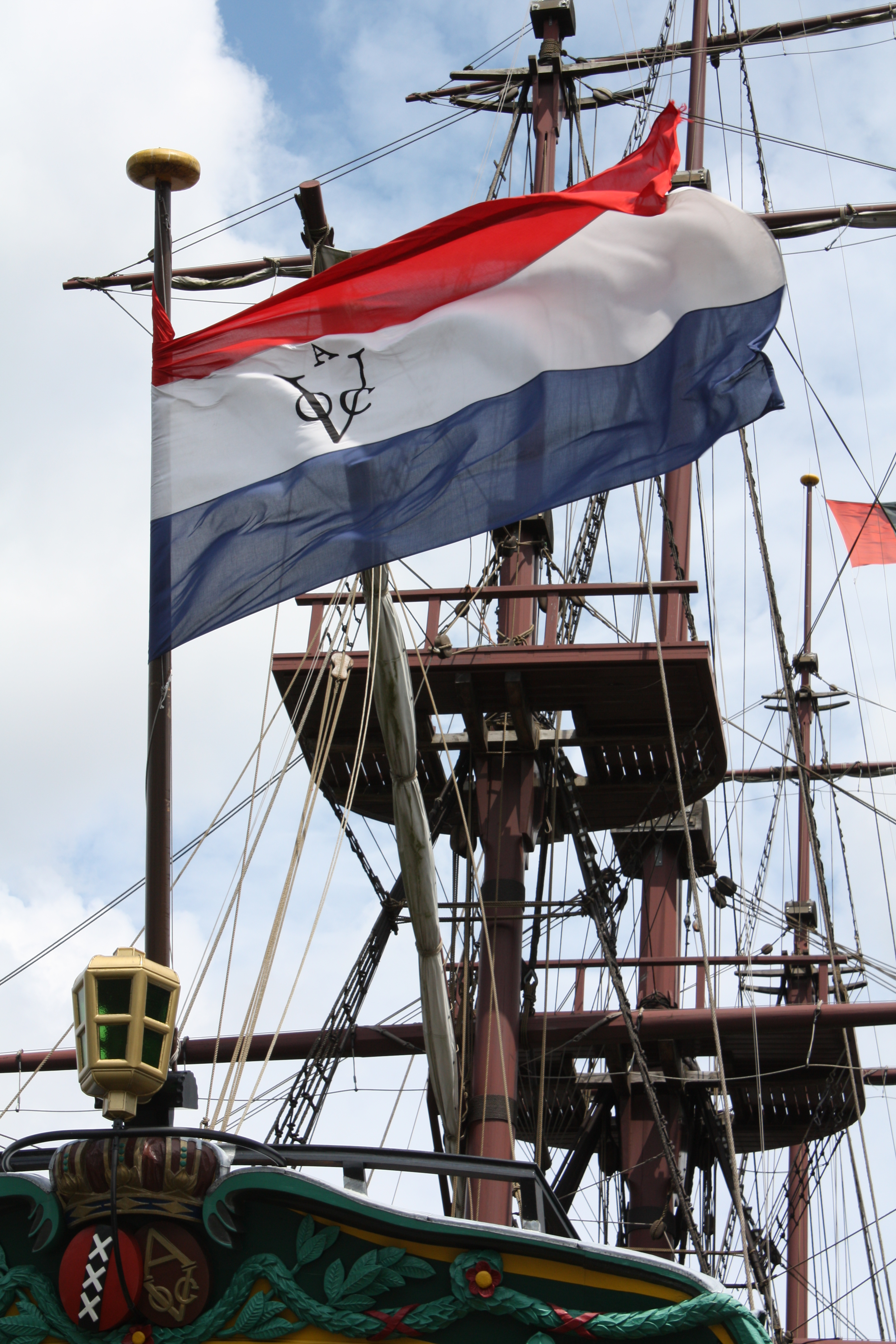
Replica of an East Indiaman of the Dutch East India Company/United East Indies Company (VOC)

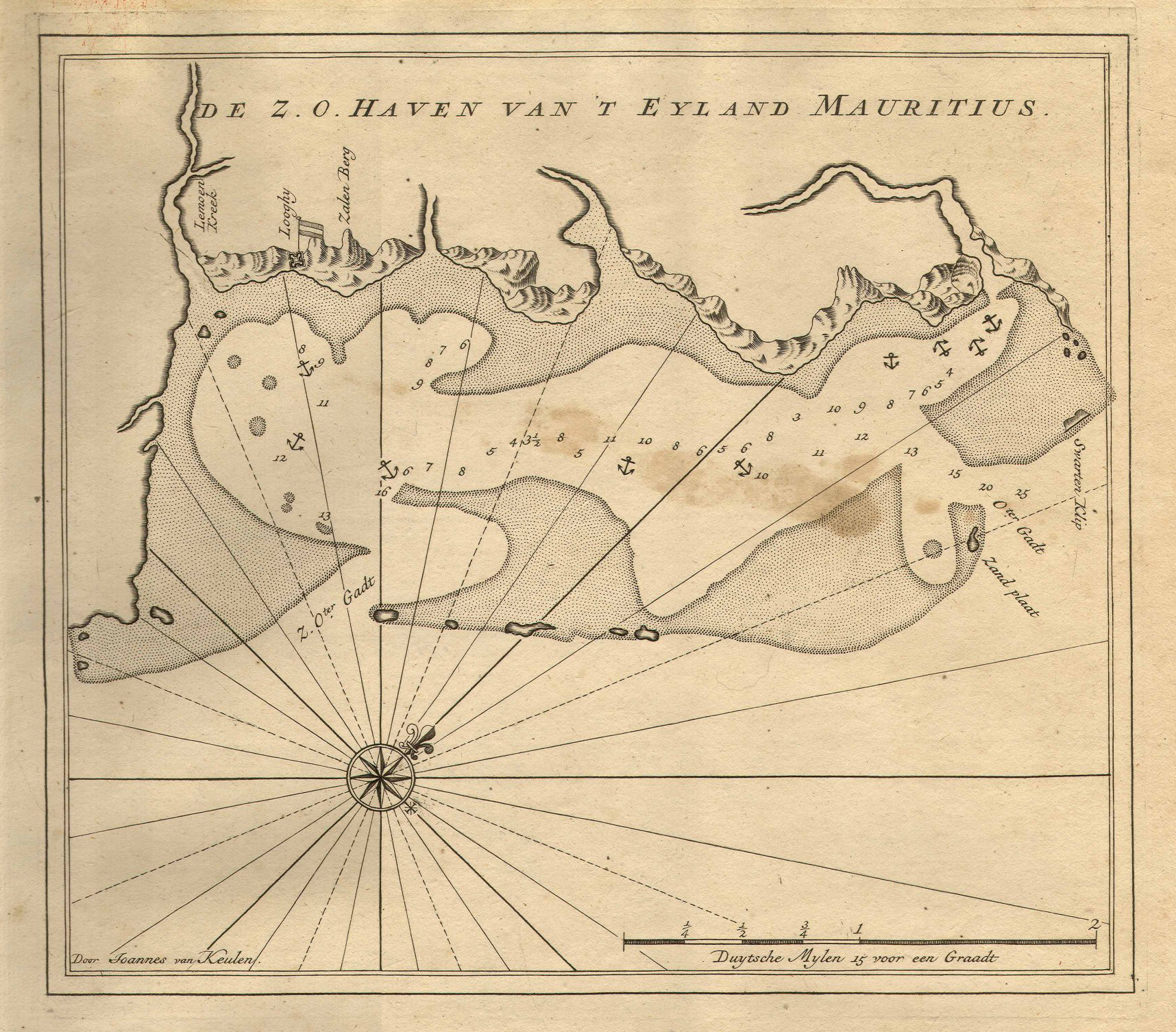
Dutch map of a coast of Mauritius. Dutch Mauritius (1638–1710) was the first permanent human settlement to be established on the island.

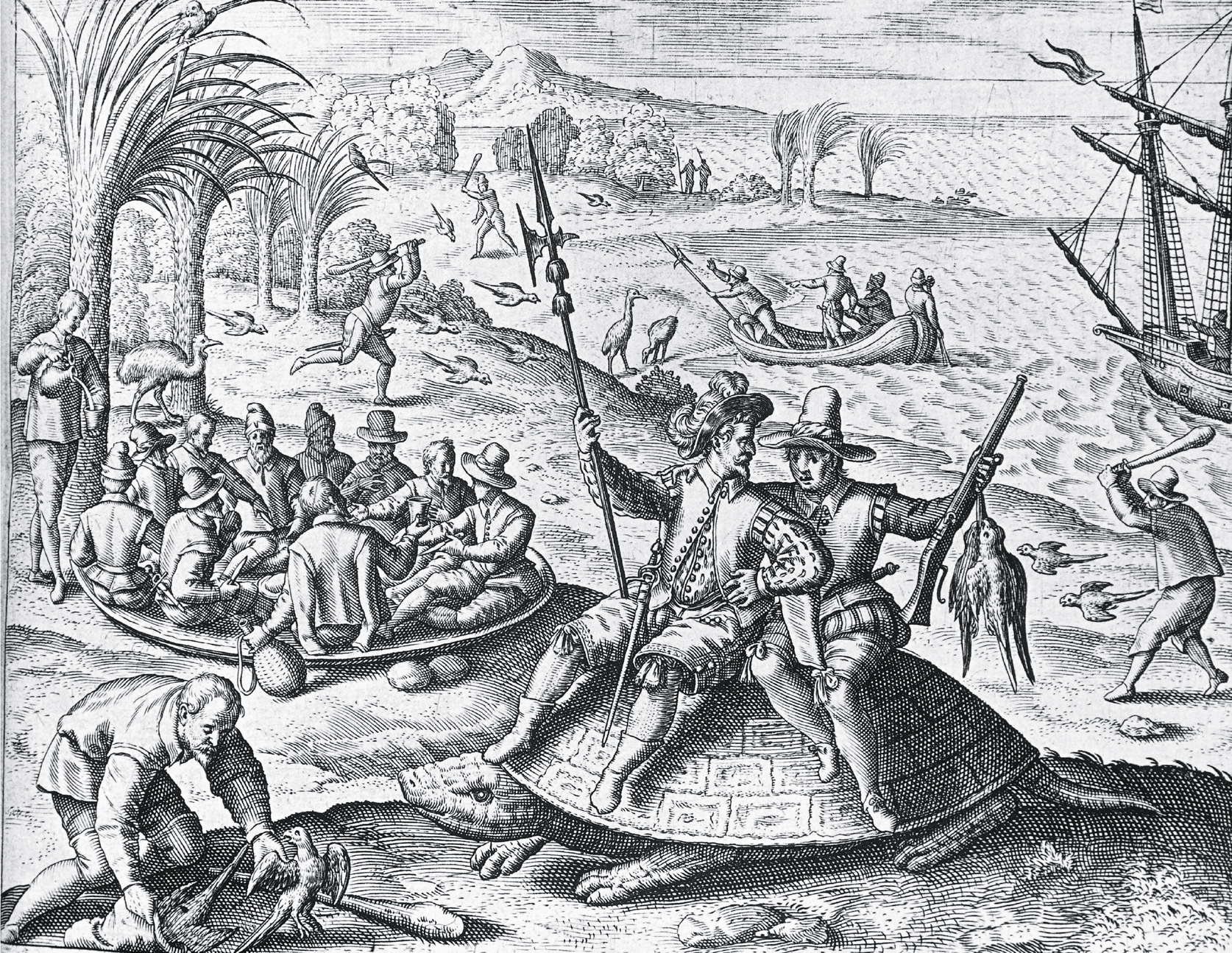
Parrot hunting on Mauritius by Johann Theodor de Bry, 1601

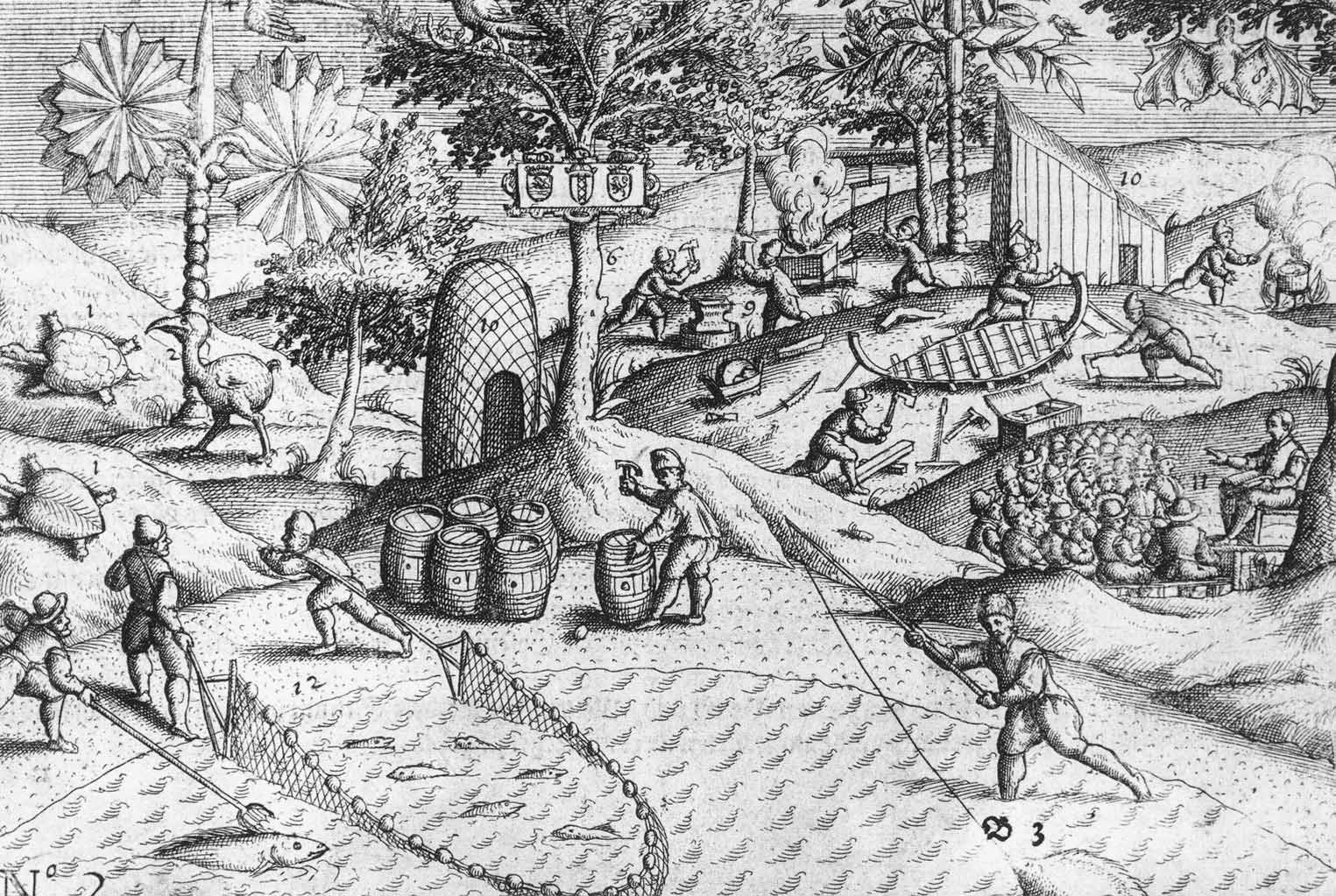
Copper engraving from Het Tweede Boeck showing Dutch activities on the shore of Mauritius during the 1598 voyage of Admiral Jacob van Neck, as well as the first published depictions of a dodo (2) and a broad-billed parrot (5), both now extinct. Johann Theodor de Bry, 1598

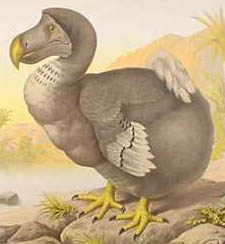
A representation of the extinct dodo bird. Dutch presence on the island largely contributed to the extinction of this endemic bird.

In 1598, the second Dutch Expedition to Indonesia consisting of eight ships, under the orders of admirals Jacques Cornelius van Neck and Wybrandt van Warwyck, set sail from Texel, Netherlands, towards the Indian subcontinent. The eight ships ran into foul weather after passing the Cape of Good Hope and were separated. Three found their way to the northeast of Madagascar, while the remaining five regrouped and sailed in a southeasterly direction. On 17 September, the five ships under the orders of Admiral van Warwyck came into view of Mauritius. On 20 September, they entered a sheltered bay which they named "Port de Warwick" (now known as "Grand Port"). They landed and decided to name the island "Prins Mauritz van Nassaueiland," after the son of William the Silent, Prince Maurits (Latin version: Mauritius) of the House of Nassau, the stadtholder of most of the Dutch Republic, and after the main vessel of the fleet, the "Mauritius". From that time, only the name Mauritius has remained. On 2 October, the ships again took to the sea towards Bantam

From then on, the island's Port de Warwick was used by Dutch ships as a stopover after long months at sea. In 1606, two expeditions came for the first time to what would later become Port-Louis in the northwest part of the island. The expedition, consisting of eleven ships and 1,357 men under the orders of Admiral Corneille, came into the bay, which they named "Rade des Tortues" (literally meaning "Harbor of the Tortoises") because of the great number of terrestrial tortoises they found there. From that date, Dutch sailors shifted their choice to Rade des Tortues as a harbour.

In 1615, the shipwreck and death of governor Pieter Both, who was coming back from India with four richly laden ships in the bay, led Dutch sailors to consider the route cursed, and they tried to avoid it as much as possible. In the meantime, the British and the Danes were beginning to make incursions into the Indian Ocean. Those who landed on the island freely cut and took with them the precious heartwood of the ebony trees, then found in profusion all over the island.

Dutch colonization started in 1638 and ended in 1710, with a brief interruption between 1658 and 1666 (the year of Great Fire of London). Numerous governors were appointed, but continuous hardships such as cyclones, droughts, pest infestations, lack of food, and illnesses in the end took their toll, and the island was definitively abandoned in 1710.

The island was not permanently inhabited for the first forty years after its "discovery" by the Dutch, but in 1638 Cornelius Gooyer established the first permanent Dutch settlement in Mauritius with a garrison of twenty-five. He thus became the first governor of the island. In 1639, thirty more men came to reinforce the Dutch colony. Gooyer was instructed to develop the commercial potential of the island, but he did nothing of the sort, so he was recalled. His successor was Adriaan van der Stel, who began the development in earnest, developing the export of ebony wood. For that purpose, van der Stel brought 105 Malagasy slaves to the island. Within the first week, about sixty were able to escape into the forests; about twenty of them were recaptured.

In 1644, the islanders were faced with many months of hardships, due to delayed shipment of supplies, bad harvests, and cyclones. During those months, the colonists could only rely on their own ability to feed themselves by fishing and hunting. Nonetheless, van der Stel secured the shipment of 95 more servants from Madagascar, before being transferred to Ceylon. His replacement was Jacob van der Meersh. In 1645, the latter brought in 108 more Malagasy servants. Van der Meersh left Mauritius in September 1648 and was replaced by Reinier Por.

In 1652, more hardships befell the inhabitants, colonists and servants alike. The population was then about a hundred people. The continuing hardships affected the commercial potential of the island and a pullout was ordered in 1657. On 16 July 1658, all the inhabitants left the island apart from a ship's 'boy' and two servants who had taken shelter in the forests. Thus the first attempt at Dutch colonization ended badly

In 1664, a second attempt also ended badly, as the men chosen for the job abandoned their sick commander, van Niewland, without proper treatment, and he died

From 1666 to 1669, Dirk Jansz Smient administered the new colony at Port de Warwick, with the cutting down and export of ebony trees as the main activity. When Dirk Jansz Smient left, he was replaced by George Frederik Wreeden, who died in 1672, drowned with five other colonists during a reconnaissance expedition. His replacement would be Hubert Hugo. Hugo was a man of vision and wanted to make the island into an agricultural colony. His vision was not shared by his superiors, and he eventually had to abandon the attempt.

Issac Johannes Lamotius became the new governor when Hugo left in 1677. Lamotius governed until 1692, when he was deported to Batavia for judgment for persecuting a colonist whose wife had refused his courtship. A new governor, Roelof Diodati, was then appointed in 1692. Diodati faced many problems in his attempts to develop the island, such as cyclones, pest infestations, cattle illnesses, and droughts.

On 7 January 1702, the pirate John Bowen foundered his ship called the 'speaker' onto a 'Swarte Klip' beach (a black rock beach?) on the East of Mauritius. A hundred and seventy pirates armed to the teeth against a poorly armed and frail Dutch population of fifty meant the 'crafty' Diodati had no choice but to sell them a small sloop for them to enlarge so as to leave Mauritius.

Eventually discouraged, Diodati gave up and his replacement was Abraham Momber van de Velde. The latter fared no better but remained the last Dutch governor of the island until it was abandoned in 1710, again.

Slaves were not particularly well treated by the colonists, and revolts or the act of organizing one were severely repressed and punished. Some punishments consisted of amputation of various parts of the body and exposure in the open air for a day as example to others, eventually culminating in condemned slaves’ execution at sunset.

The legacy of the Dutch in Mauritius includes:

- Providing the name for the country and for many regions over the whole island. Some examples include "Pieter Both" mountain and the "Vandermeersh" region near Rose-Hill, as well as many other names.
- Introduction of sugar cane plants from Java.
- Decimating the local dodo and giant tortoise populations for food and by introducing competing species and pests, sometimes involuntarily.
- Clearing of large swathes of ancient forests for ebony wood exploitation in Europe.

== French rule (1715–1810) ==
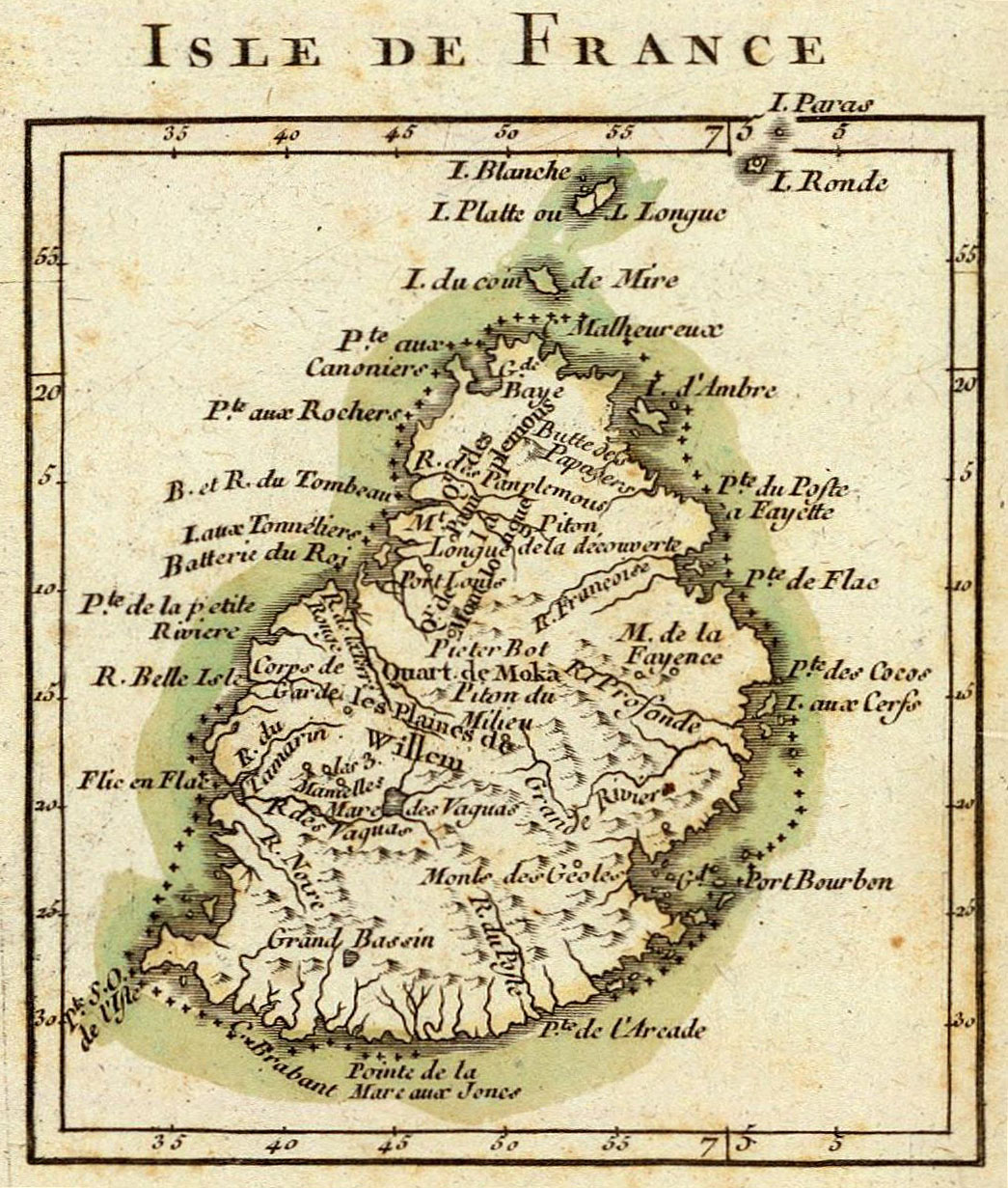
French map from 1791 depicting Mauritius (then called "Isle de France").

Abandoned by the Dutch, the island became a French colony when, in September 1715, Guillaume Dufresne d'Arsel landed and took possession of this port of call on the route to India. He named the island "Isle de France". Six years later, in 1721, the French started their occupation. However, it was only from 1735, with the arrival of the French governor, Mahé de La Bourdonnais, that "Isle de France" started developing effectively. Mahé de La Bourdonnais planted spices such as pepper, cinnamon and cloves at "Jardin Pamplemousses". Mahé de La Bourdonnais established Port Louis as a naval base and a shipbuilding centre. Under his governorship, numerous buildings were built, a number of which still stand today: part of Government House, the Château de Mon Plaisir at Pamplemousses and the Line Barracks. In early 1729 Indians from Pondicherry arrived in Mauritius aboard the vessel La Sirène. Work contracts for these craftsmen were signed in 1734 at the time when they acquired their freedom. The island was under the administration of the French East India Company which maintained its presence until 1767. In 1796 the French settlers broke away from French control when the government in Paris attempted to abolish slavery, and the local colonists expelled government envoys Baco and Burnel. During the French rule slaves were brought from parts of Africa such as Mozambique, Madagascar and Zanzibar. As a result, the island's population rose dramatically from 15,000 to 49,000 within 30 years. During the late 18th century African slaves accounted for around 80 percent of the island's population, and by the early 19th century there were 60,000 slaves on the island.

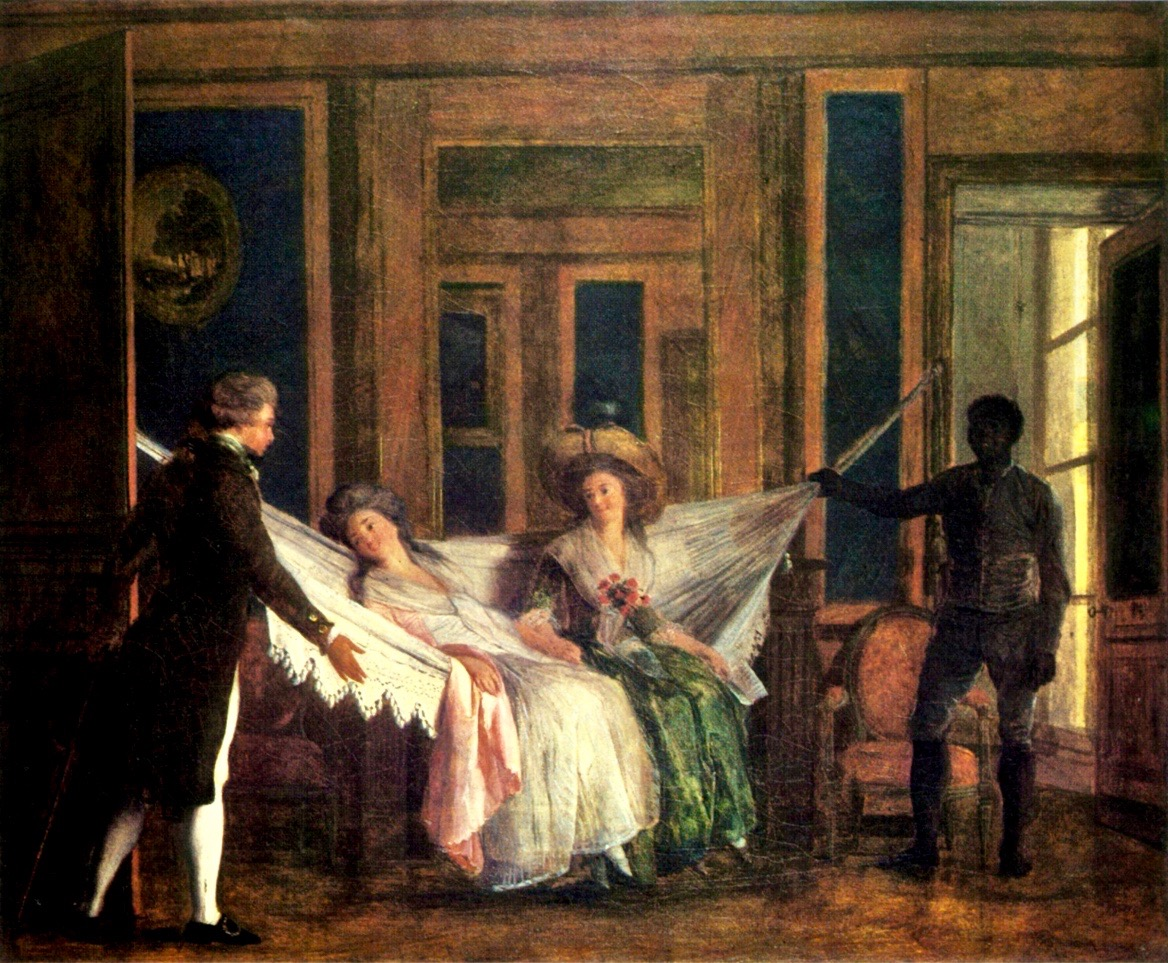
Colonist planters and their black slave, circa 1805.

In 1806, the Governor General, Charles Mathieu Isidore Decaen, created the city of Mahébourg, named in honour of Mahé de La Bourdonnais. It was originally known as Bourg Mahé. From that year until 1810, the island was in charge of officials appointed by the French government, except for a brief period during the French Revolution, when the inhabitants set up a government virtually independent of France.

During the Napoleonic Wars, the "Isle de France" became a base from which French corsairs organised successful raids on British commercial ships. The raids continued until 1810 when a strong British expedition was sent to capture the island. A preliminary attack was foiled at Grand Port in August 1810, but the main attack launched in December of the same year from Rodrigues, which had been captured during the same year, was successful. Rodrigues had previously been visited only for fresh water and food by the British in 1809. In late November 1810 the British landed in large numbers in the north of the island near Cap Malheureux and rapidly overpowered the French, who capitulated on 3 December 1810. By the Treaty of Paris in 1814, the "Isle de France", which was renamed "Mauritius" was ceded to Great Britain, together with Rodrigues and the Seychelles. In the act of capitulation, the British guaranteed that they would respect the languages, the customs, the laws and the traditions of the inhabitants.

== British rule (1810–1968) ==
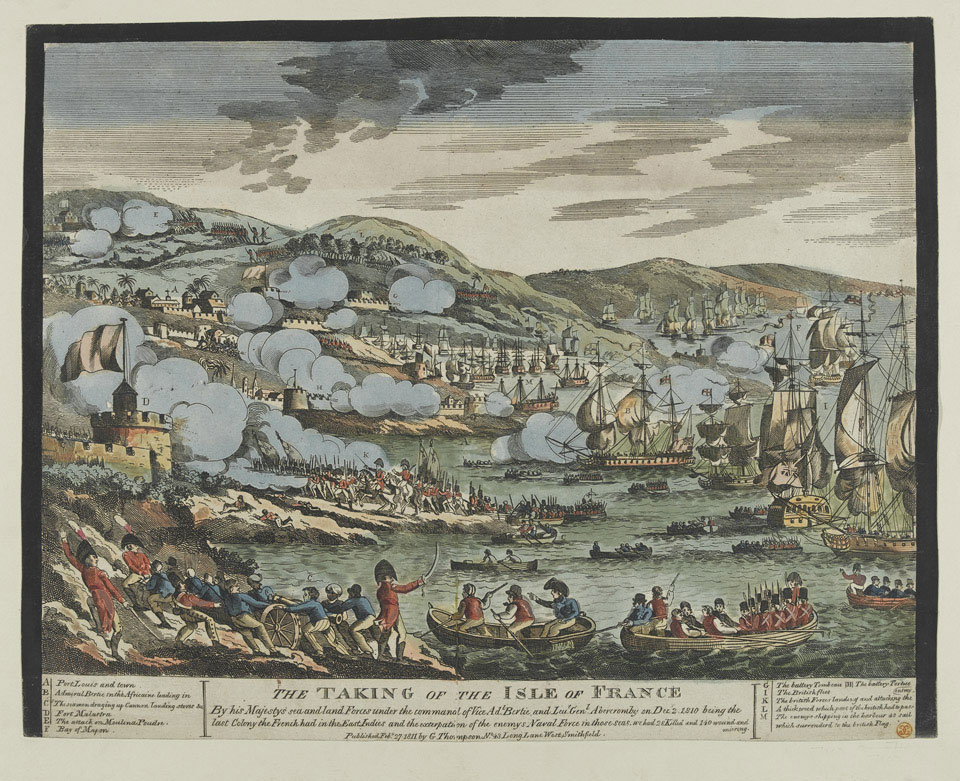
The taking of the Isle of France 2 December 1810, G. Thompson

Despite the only French naval victory (during the Napoleonic Wars) of Battle of Grand Port on 19 and 20 August 1810 by a fleet commanded by Pierre Bouvet, Mauritius was captured on 3 December 1810 by the British under Commodore Josias Rowley. Their possession of the island was confirmed four years later by the Treaty of Paris (1814). French institutions, including the Napoleonic Code of law, were maintained. The French language was at that moment still used more widely than English.

The British administration, which began with Robert Townsend Farquhar as governor, was followed by rapid social and economic changes. An important figure of the 19th century was Rémy Ollier, a journalist of mixed origin. In 1828, the colour bar was officially abolished in Mauritius, but British governors gave little power to coloured persons, and appointed only whites as leading officials. Rémy Ollier petitioned to Queen Victoria to allow coloureds in the council of government, and this became possible a few years later. He also made Port Louis become a municipality so that the citizens could administer the town through their own elected representatives. A street has been named after him in Port Louis, and his bust was erected in the Jardin de la Compagnie in 1906.

=== Abolition of slavery ===
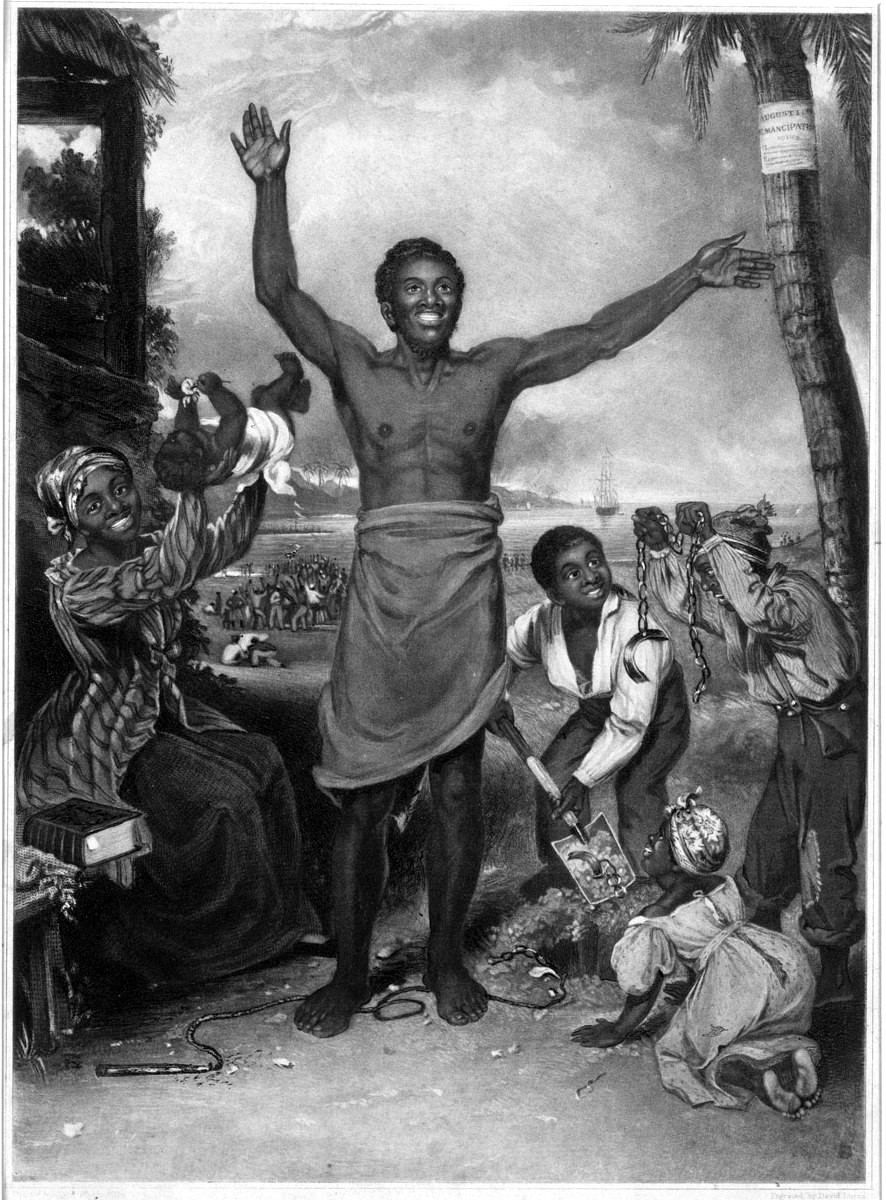
Engraving celebrating the abolition of slavery in the British Empire, 19th century.

Long opposed by planters, the abolition of slavery became effective in Mauritius on 1 February 1835. 66,343 people were freed. However, the British Crown accompanied this abolition with substantial compensation for the planters for the loss of their slaves who had been imported from Africa and Madagascar. Compensation was calculated according to the number of people enslaved, their age, their sex, and their position.

In total, 2,112,632 pounds sterling (equivalent to 1.5 billion pounds in 2025) were paid to Mauritian owners, the largest of whom were "absentees", living in Great Britain and having never set foot in the colonies. To finance compensation in all its slave colonies, the British government negotiated a colossal loan of 15 million pounds sterling with financiers Nathan Mayer Rothschild and Moïse Montefiore on 3 August 1835. The repayment of this debt was not completed until 2015, almost two centuries later.

According to historian Stephanie Tamby-Lai Kong Ling, “By compensating masters instead of victims, colonial societies deepened the wounds of slavery and laid the foundations for structural inequalities that persist.” Moreover, large plantations remained in the hands of wealthy families.

=== Indenture system ===
Mauritian Creoles trace their origins to the plantation owners and slaves who were brought to work the sugar fields. When slavery was abolished on 1 February 1835, an attempt was made to secure a cheap source of adaptable labour for intensive sugar plantations in Mauritius. Indentured labour began with Chinese, Malay, African and Malagasy labourers, but ultimately, it was India, then under British rule, which supplied the much needed laborers to Mauritius. The term applied to the indentured during this period, and which has since become a derogatory term for Mauritians of Asian descent, was "Coolie". The island soon became the key-point in the trade of indentured laborers, as thousands of Indians set forth from Calcutta or Karikal; not only did they modify the social, political and economic physiognomies of the island, but some also went farther, to the West Indies.

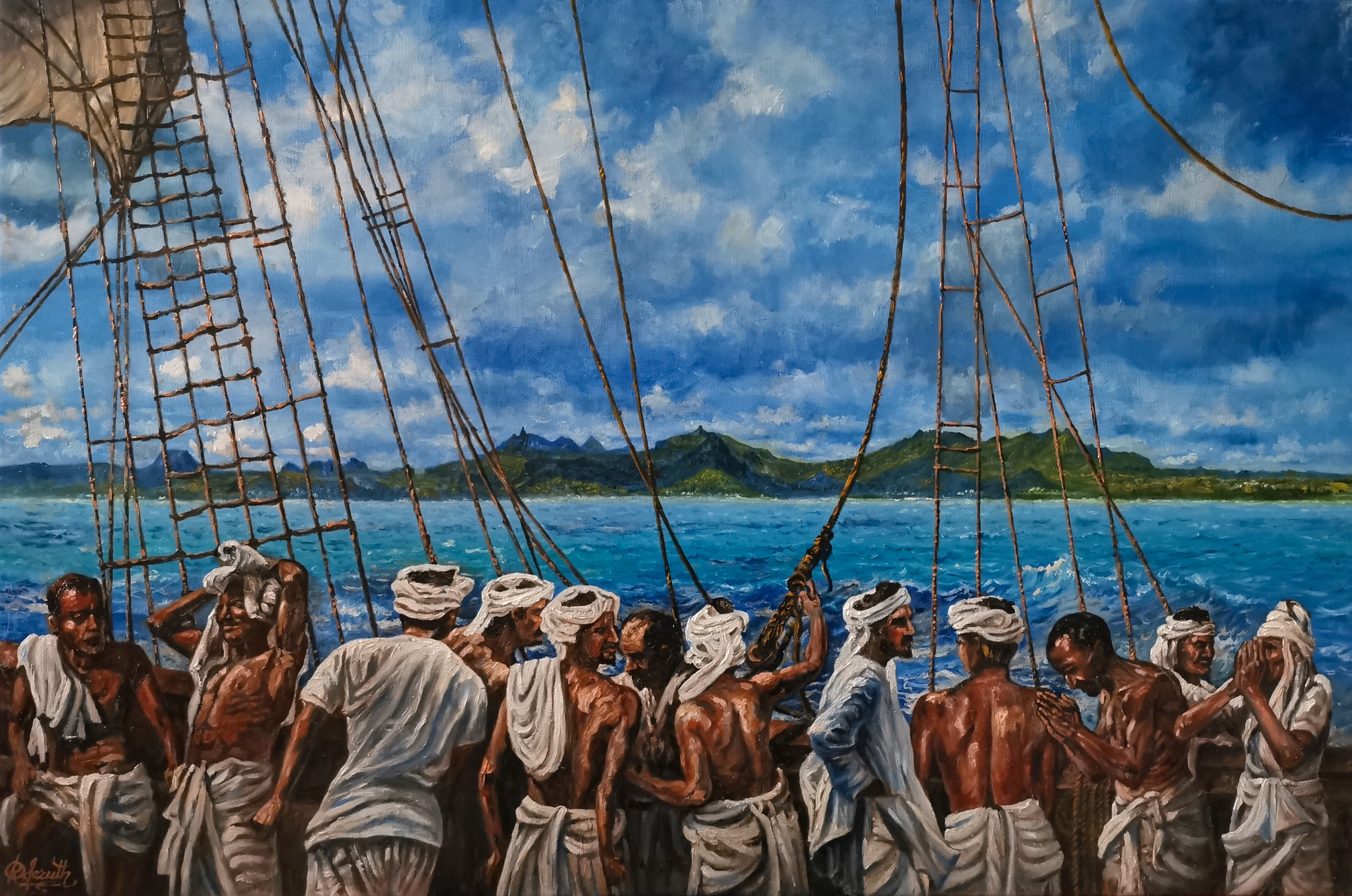
Painting depicting the first indentured Indian labourers arriving in Mauritius, by Raouf Oderuth

Indo-Mauritians are descended from Indian immigrants, most of whom arrived between 1835 and 1924 via the Coolie Ghat to work as indentured labourers after slavery was abolished in 1835. Included in the Indo-Mauritian community are Muslims (about 17% of the population) from the Indian subcontinent. Events such as the 1850 Yamsé Ghoon Riots indicated the prevalence of ethnic tensions against the newly arrived Muslims from India. The Franco-Mauritian elite controlled nearly all of the large sugar estates and was active in business and banking. As the Indian population became numerically dominant and the voting franchise was extended, political power shifted from the Franco-Mauritians and their Creole allies to the Indo-Mauritians.

In November 1901, Mahatma Gandhi visited Mauritius, on his way from South Africa to India. He stayed on the island for two weeks, and urged the Indo-Mauritian community to take an interest in education and to play a more active role in politics. Back in India, he sent over a young lawyer, Manilal Doctor, to improve the plight of the Indo-Mauritians. The meeting of a mosaic of people from India, China, Africa and Europe began a process of hybridisation and intercultural frictions and dialogues, which poet Khal Torabully has termed "coolitude". This social reality is a major reference for identity opened to otherness and is widely used in Mauritius where it represents a humanism of diversity.

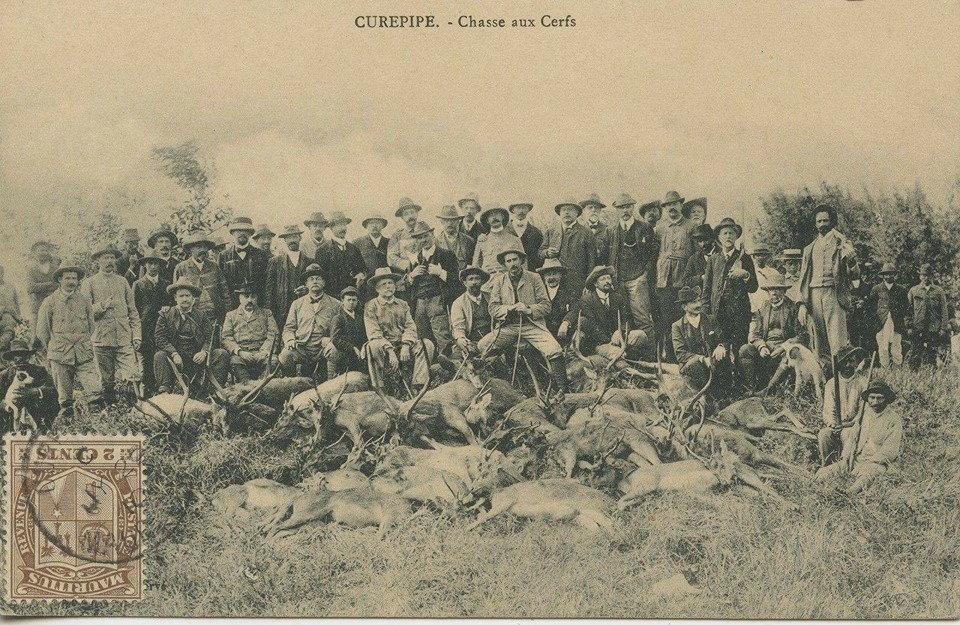
Deer-hunting in Curepipe, circa 1900

The opening of the Suez Canal in 1869 reduced the number of ships transiting via Mauritius. This had a detrimental impact on the local economy. Conflicts arose between the Indian community (mostly sugarcane labourers) and the Franco-Mauritians in the 1920s, leading to several – mainly Indian – deaths. Following this, the Mauritius Labour Party was founded in 1936 by Maurice Curé to safeguard the interest of the labourers. Curé was succeeded a year later by Emmanuel Anquetil who tried to gain the support of the port workers. After his death, Guy Rozemont took over the leadership of the party.

The Mauritius Territorial Force (MTF), a British Colonial Auxiliary Forces formation consisting of infantry and coastal artillery units, was created in 1934. During World War II, thousands of Mauritians voluntarily joined or were conscripted into the British Armed Forces, MTF, Special Operations Executive and Free French Forces, along with military and civilian labour roles. Mauritius was an important base for cable and wireless signals intelligence as well as a base to counter the activities of Imperial Japanese Navy submarines and the Kriegsmarine's Monsun Gruppe.

As a result of the war, the MTF was expanded to comprise two battalions, and was renamed the Mauritius Regiment in 1943. A number of Mauritians served in the British Army's Royal Pioneer Corps, seeing action in the North African and Italian campaigns. In December 1943, the 1,000-strong Mauritius Regiment mutinied in Madagascar as a result of anger over the regiment being sent abroad, as its members had enlisted for service only in Mauritius. During the war, more than 1,500 Central European Jews who were denied entry to Mandatory Palestine in 1940 were detained in Beau Bassin until 1945.

Elections in August 1948 for the newly created Legislative Council (under the revised 1947 Constitution) marked Mauritius's first steps toward self-rule. It was the first time that women were represented and a significant number of Indo-Mauritians and Creoles were elected. The previous Council of Government was replaced by the new Legislative Council composed of 19 elected members, 12 members nominated by the Governor and 3 ex-officio members. The first sitting of the Legislative Council took place on 1 September 1948.

== Independence (1968) ==
Flag of Mauritius (1968)

An independence campaign gained momentum after 1961, when the British agreed to permit additional self-government and eventual independence. A coalition composed of the Mauritian Labour Party (MLP), the Comité d'Action Musulman (CAM), and the Independent Forward Bloc (IFB) – a traditionalist Hindu party – won a majority in the 1967 Legislative Assembly election, despite opposition from Franco-Mauritian and Creole supporters of Sir Gaetan Duval QC's and Jules Koenig's Mauritian Social Democratic Party (PMSD). The Labour-IFB-CAM coalition was known as Independence Party (Mauritius). Sir Seewoosagur Ramgoolam, Chief Minister in the colonial government, became the first prime minister after independence, on 12 March 1968. The date of 12 March was specifically chosen to coincide with Mahatma Gandhi's Salt March which occurred on 12 March 1930. Between 1965 and 1968 there were various ethnic riots which could only be brought under control with assistance from British troops who flew in from South-East Asia. The communal strife that preceded independence led to around 300 deaths.

Queen's Personal Mauritian Flag

British rule ended on 12 March 1968 with the Mauritius Independence Act 1968. The British monarch, Elizabeth II, remained nominal head of state as Queen of Mauritius. Her constitutional roles were delegated to the Governor-General of Mauritius. The last governor, Sir John Shaw Rennie served as the first governor-general until 27 August 1968.

Whilst in power the Labour-IFB-CAM coalition (Independence Party (Mauritius)) disintegrated by 1969, most IFB MPs landed on opposition benches whilst most PMSD MPs joined the Labour-CAM government. The remaining PMSD MPs who refused to follow Gaetan Duval formed a new party called Union Démocratique Mauricienne (UDM) which together with the IFB formed the opposition to the Labour-CAM-PMSD government. In 1969, the Mouvement Militant Mauricien led by Paul Bérenger and Heeralall Bhugaloo emerged. The first MMM MP (Dev Virahsawmy) was elected in 1970 at a by-election of Constituency No. 5 following the death of IFB MP Lall Jugnauth. Until 1982, Sir Seewoosagur Ramgoolam was prime minister, his Labour Party in coalition with Duval's PMSD. In 1982, the coalition of Mouvement Militant Mauricien/Parti Socialiste Mauricien (MMM-PSM) came to power in a landslide electoral victory, with Sir Anerood Jugnauth QC as prime minister and Harish Boodhoo as the Deputy Prime Minister. The coalition split in 1983, with Sir Anerood Jugnauth QC forming the Mouvement Socialiste Mauricien (MSM), which became the governing party, with Jugnauth as prime minister. Following the electoral defeat of 1982 Sir Satcam Boolell was dismissed from the Labour Party, which led him to form a new party, Mouvement Patriotique Mauricien (MPM), before returning to the Labour Party in 1983. Sir Seewoosagur Ramgoolam subsequently became Governor General.

Sir Satcam Boolell was dismissed from the Labour Party (Mauritius) soon after the massive electoral defeat of 1982, and he formed a new party Mouvement Patriotique Mauricien (MPM) which was a short-lived venture, as he was allowed back into the Labour Party in 1983 soon before the collapse of the MMM-PSM government. Boolell was president of the Labour Party (Mauritius) from 1984 to 1991. In 1990 Seewoosagur's son, Navin Ramgoolam, succeeded him as leader of the party which was defeated at the 1991 elections, which saw Sir Anerood Jugnauth QC re-elected under a MMM-MSM government.

The Republic of Mauritius was proclaimed on 12 March 1992. Following the abolition of the monarchy, the last Governor General of Mauritius, Sir Veerasamy Ringadoo became the first President of Mauritius, functioning as a ceremonial figurehead.

=== Republic (1992-present) ===
In December 1991, the Constitution was amended to make Mauritius a republic within the Commonwealth. Mauritius became a republic on 12 March 1992, with the last governor general, Sir Veerasamy Ringadoo, as interim president. He was succeeded by Cassam Uteem on 30 June 1992.

Dr. Navin Ramgoolam led a MLP-MMM coalition to victory at the 1995 general elections, replacing Sir Aneerood Jugnauth QC as prime minister, a post the latter had occupied for 13 years. The governing coalition split in 1997, with the MMM going back to the Opposition and Dr. Navin Ramgoolam staying on as prime minister.

At the next elections in 2000, Sir Anerood Jugnauth's MSM, in coalition with Paul Bérenger's MMM was returned to power, with Sir Anerood Jugnauth QC appointed as prime minister. He subsequently retired as prime minister after 3 years and assumed the office of president. For the remaining time of the elected government the prime minister's post was filled by Paul Bérenger. At the 2005 general elections, the MLP-led Alliance Sociale coalition won the elections, and Dr. Navin Ramgoolam became prime minister while Sir Anerood Jugnauth QC remained the president. The 2010 general elections saw the victory of a MLP-MSM-PMSD coalition (known as "L'Alliance de l'Avenir") and the maintaining of Dr. Navin Ramgoolam as prime minister. A year or so later, Sir Anerood Jugnauth QC left the presidency and was replaced by Kailash Purryag, an attorney at law and politician, who has served the country as senior minister on many occasions under the leadership of Dr. Navin Ramgoolam. The 2014 general elections saw the victory of a MSM-PMSD-ML coalition (known as "L'alliance Lepep") and Sir Aneerood Jugnauth became Prime Minister while Kailash Prayag remained the president until 2016 when Mrs Ameena Gureeb Fakim became the first female president. However, she resigned over a financial scandal in March 2018.

In January 2017, Prime Minister Anerood Jugnauth stepped down to hand power to his son, Pravind. In November 2019, Mauritius’ ruling Militant Socialist Movement (MSM) won more than half of the seats in the 2019 elections, securing incumbent Prime Minister Pravind Kumar Jugnauth a new five-year term. On 25 July 2020, Japanese-owned bulk carrier MV Wakashio ran aground on a coral reef off the coast of Mauritius, leaking up to 1,000 tonnes of heavy oil into a pristine lagoon. Its location on the edge of protected fragile marine ecosystems and a wetland of international importance made the MV Wakashio oil spill one of the worst environmental disasters ever to hit the western Indian Ocean.

On 5 December 2022, Yu Feng 67, a Taiwanese long liner based in Port Louis and authorised by the Mauritian Fisheries Planning and Licensing Division ran aground on the reefs of St. Brandon with 70 tonnes of diesel, 1 tonne of heavy oils and 30 to 40 tonnes of baitfish on board. This was the fourth Taiwanese shipwreck in Mauritius in 2022.

On 10 November 2024, the opposition coalition, Alliance du Changement, won 60 of the 64 seats in the Mauritian general election. Its leader, former prime minister Navin Ramgoolam, became new prime minister.

On 3 October 2024 it was announced through a joint statement by the UK and Mauritian governments that the archipelago was to have its sovereignty transferred to Mauritius. The island of Diego Garcia, which contains the military base Camp Justice, was the only exception to this new treaty, with administration being leased to the United Kingdom by the Mauritian government for a period of at least 99 years. The transfer agreement was signed on 22 May 2025, with the provision that the island of Diego Garcia would be leased back to the UK for at least 99 years. The UK government expects the treaty to be ratified near the end of 2025.

== See also ==
- History of Africa
- History of Southern Africa
- Politics of Mauritius
- List of prime ministers of Mauritius
- Governor of Mauritius (disambiguation)
- Port Louis history and timeline
