= Governor of Dutch Mauritius =

Opperhoofd of Mauritius
- Logo of the Dutch East India Company
- Precursor: None
- Formation: 20 September 1598; 427 years ago
- First holder: Wybrant Warwijck
- Final holder: Abraham Momber van de Velde
- Abolished: 6 September 1718; 308 years ago
- Succession: Governor of Isle de France

The Opperhoofd of Mauritius was an official who ruled Dutch Mauritius (now Republic of Mauritius) during the Dutch colonial period between 1598 and 1718. The island was under the administration of the Dutch East India Company.

== List of Opperhoofds (1598–1710) ==
A list of Opperhoofd of Mauritius from 1598 to 1710.

#	Incumbent	Portrait	Tenure	
#	Incumbent	Portrait	Took office	Left office
Dutch Expedition to Mauritius
1.	Wybrant Warwijck		20 September 1598	1598
Island abandoned 1598 to 6 May 1638
Dutch Mauritius under the Dutch East India Company
2.	Cornelis Simonszoon Gooyer		6 May 1638	7 November 1639
3.	Adriaan van der Stel		7 November 1639	1645
4.	Jacob van der Meersch		1645	September 1648
5.	Reinier Por		1648	1653
6.	Joost van der Woutbeekr		1653	1654
7.	Maximiliaan de Jongh		1654	1656
8.	Abraham Evertszoon		1656	16 July 1658
Abandoned; 16 July 1658 to 1664
9.	Jacobus van Nieuwlant		1664	May 1665
10.	Georg Frederick Wreede		1665	1667
11.	Jan van Laar		1667	1668
12.	Dirk Janszoon Smient		1668	1669
13.	Georg Frederick Wreede		1669	1672
14.	Swen Felleson		1672	
15.	Philip Col		1672	13 February 1673
16.	Hubert Hugo		13 February 1673	4 October 1677
17.	Isaac Johannes Lamotius		4 October 1677	22 October 1692
18.	Roelof Deodati		22 October 1692	25 November 1703
19.	Abraham Momber van de Velde		25 November 1703	17 February 1710
Abandoned; 17 February 1710 to 6 September 1718

== See also ==
- Governor of Mauritius
