= Isle de France (Mauritius) =

1715–1810 French colony in the Indian Ocean

Coordinates: 20°10′S 57°31′E

- 1715–1810
- Flag (1715–1792) Coat of arms (1715–1792)
- Motto: "Stella Clavisque Maris Indici" (Latin) "Star and Key of the Indian Ocean"
- Anthem: Marche Henri IV (1715–1792) Chant de guerre pour l'Armée du Rhin (1792–1804) Chant du départ (1804–1810)
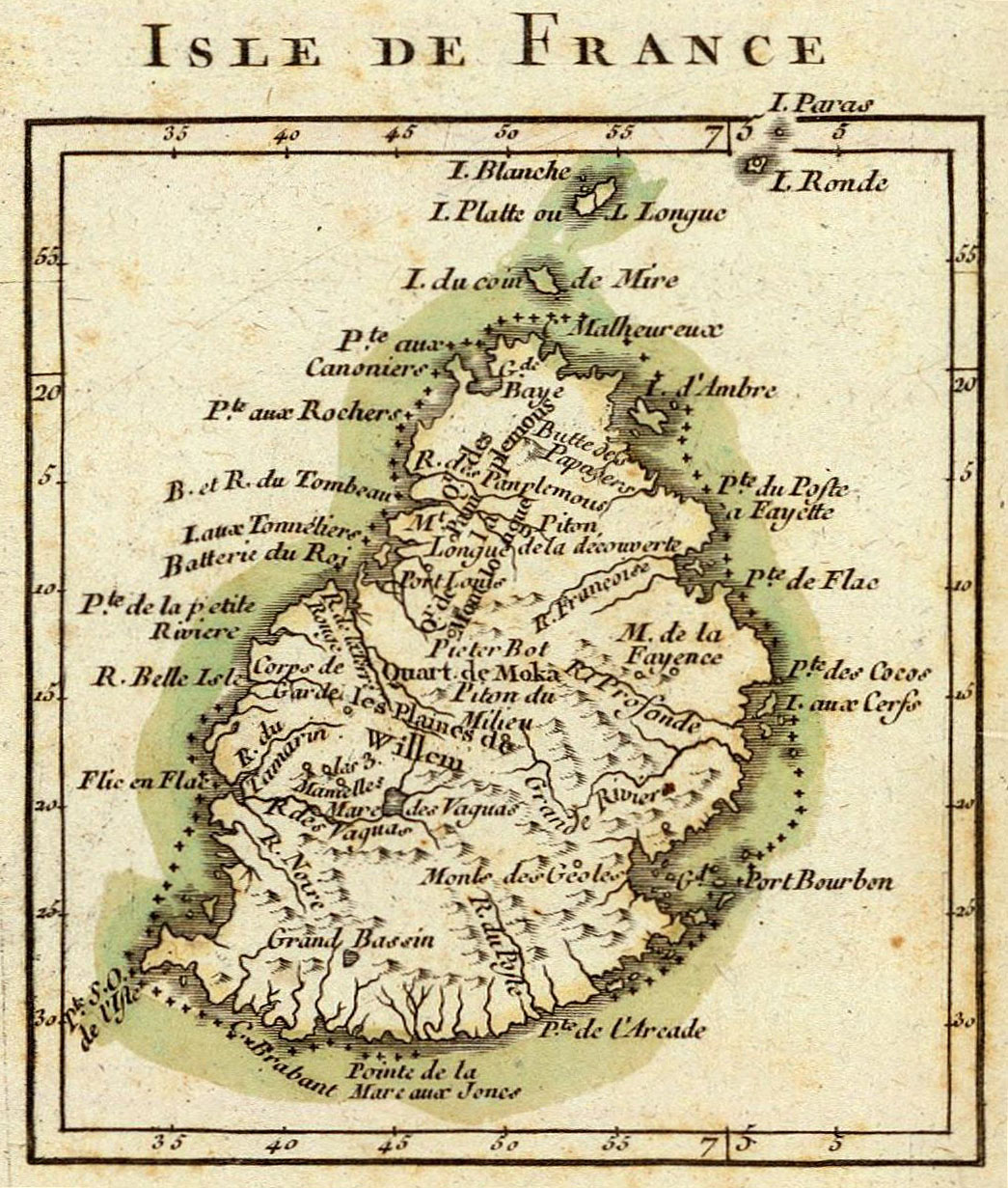
- Map of Isle de France by Rigobert Bonne, 1791
- Status: Colony of France
- Capital: Port Louis
- Common languages: French; Mauritian Creole
- Governor
  - 1721–1725 (first): Denis, chevalier de Nyon
  - 1803–1810 (last): Charles Decaen
- Historical era: Early modern
  - Established: 20 September 1715
  - Disestablished: 3 December 1810
  - Ceded to the United Kingdom: 30 May 1814

Population
  - 1735: 838
- Currency: French livre (until 1794); French franc (from 1794); Napoléon (from 1803)
Preceded by	Succeeded by
Dutch Mauritius	British Mauritius
- Today part of: British Indian Ocean Territory; Mauritius; Tromelin Island

Isle de France (Modern French: Île de France, pronounced [il də fʁɑ̃s]) was a French colony in the Indian Ocean from 1715 to 1810, comprising the island now known as Mauritius and its dependent territories. It was governed by the French East India Company and formed part of the French colonial empire. Under the French, the island witnessed major changes. The increasing importance of agriculture led to the "import" of slaves and the undertaking of vast infrastructural works that transformed the capital Port Louis into a major port, warehousing, and commercial centre.

During the Napoleonic Wars, Isle de France became a base from which the French navy, including squadrons under Rear Admiral Linois or Commodore Jacques Hamelin, and corsairs such as Robert Surcouf, organised raids on British merchant ships. The raids (see Battle of Pulo Aura and Mauritius campaign of 1809–1811) continued until 1810 when the British sent a strong expedition to capture the island. The first British attempt, in August 1810, to attack Grand Port resulted in a French victory, one celebrated on the Arc de Triomphe in Paris. A subsequent and much larger attack launched in December of the same year from Rodrigues, which had been captured a year earlier, was successful. The British landed in large numbers in the north of the island and rapidly overpowered the French, who capitulated (see Invasion of Isle de France). In the Treaty of Paris (1814), the French ceded Isle de France together with its territories including Agaléga, the Cargados Carajos Shoals, the Chagos Archipelago, Rodrigues, Seychelles, and Tromelin Island to the United Kingdom. The island then reverted to its former name, 'Mauritius'.

== History ==
After the Dutch had abandoned Mauritius, the island became a French colony in September 1715 when Guillaume Dufresne d'Arsel landed and took possession of it, naming the island Isle de France. The French government turned over the administration of Mauritius to the French East India Company, but the island remained free of Europeans until 1721. Furthermore, until 1735, Isle de France was administered from Île Bourbon, now known as Réunion.

By 1726, the company had made land grants to colonists, soldiers and workers. The grants' covenants specified that recipients of the grants who could not cultivate their land for a period of 3 years would lose them. Each colonist was given 20 slaves and in return had to pay yearly one tenth of their production to the French East India Company. The attempt to develop agriculture resulted in an increasing demand for labour.

According to Lougnon, 156 ships called at Mauritius between 1721 and 1735, prior to the arrival of Bertrand-François Mahé de La Bourdonnais, most of them being Company ships. Slave traders brought a total of 650 slaves to Mauritius from Madagascar, Mozambique, India and West Africa.

International trade, in particular long-distance trade, grew in the 18th century and by the 1780s, France was the largest trading maritime power in Europe. The total value of French long-distance trade with Africa, Asia, America and re-exports to the rest of Europe was £25 million, whereas Britain's trade amounted to only £20 million. This state of affairs explained the growing importance of Port Louis as a centre of entrepôt trade. Among the French colonists, the lure of easy money and the importance of commercial activities contributed to their lack of interest in agriculture. Slave trade, both legal and illegal, was an important aspect of the French international trade in the Indian Ocean. A class of traders and merchants developed and thrived.

Governor Charles Mathieu Isidore Decaen, suspicious of the English ship HMS Cumberland which called in there to effect repairs in 1803, imprisoned its captain Matthew Flinders on the island for several years. Flinders was returning to England from Australia with the logbooks and records of his scientific explorations.

== Population ==
When La Bourdonnais arrived in Isle de France in 1735, there were 638 slaves in a population of 838 inhabitants. Thereafter, some 1,200 to 1,300 slaves arrived annually; within five years the number of slaves had quadrupled to 2,612 and the number of French had doubled. The population started to rise as more slaves were brought and more inhabitants came.

== Legacy ==
Mahé de La Bourdonnais established Port Louis as a naval base and a shipbuilding centre. Under his governorship, numerous buildings were built, a number of which are still standing today, these include part of Government House, the Château de Mon Plaisir at SSR Botanical Garden, and the Line Barracks.

== See also ==
- British Mauritius
- Dutch Mauritius
- Tromelin Island
- French colonial empire
- Governor of Isle de France (Mauritius)
- History of Mauritius
- Paul et Virginie (1788 novel)
