= Dutch Mauritius =

Former Dutch colony in africa

Coordinates: 20.2°S 57.5°E

Dutch Mauritius Nederlands Mauritius (Dutch)
- 1638–1710
- Flag Coat of arms
- Anthem: Het Wilhelmus ("The William")
- Status: Colony of the Dutch Republic
- Capital: Port de Warwick (Mahébourg)
- Common languages: Dutch
- Opperhoofd
  - 1638–1639: Cornelius Gooyer
  - 1639–1645: Adriaen van der Stel
  - 1673–1677: Hubert Hugo
  - 1703–1710: Abraham Momber van de Velde
- Historical era: Imperialism
  - Arrival of troops for Fort Frederik Hendrik: 29 August 1638
  - Decision to abandon the island: February 1710
- Currency: Dutch rijksdaalder, Dutch guilder
Preceded by	Succeeded by
Portuguese Mauritius	Isle de France (Mauritius)
- Today part of: Mauritius; Seychelles; British Indian Ocean Territory; Tromelin

Mauritius was an official settlement of the Dutch East India Company on the island of Mauritius between 1638 and 1710, and used as a refreshing station for passing ships. It was already frequented by Dutch ships from 1598 onwards, but only settled in 1638, to prevent the French and English from settling on the island.

== History ==
It has been frequently hypothesized that Mauritius was first discovered by the Arabs, who named the island Dina Arobi. The first historical evidence of the existence of an island now known as Mauritius is on a map produced by the Italian cartographer Alberto Cantino in 1502. It is a fact that Mauritius was visited by the Portuguese between 1507 and 1513. The Portuguese took no interest in this isolated island, however. Their main African base was in Mozambique, and therefore the Portuguese navigators preferred to use the Mozambique Channel to go to India. As a stopover, the Comoros to the north proved to offer a shorter and safer route on the way to Arabia and India. Thus no permanent colony was established on the island by the Portuguese.

=== Dutch sailors (1598–1637) ===
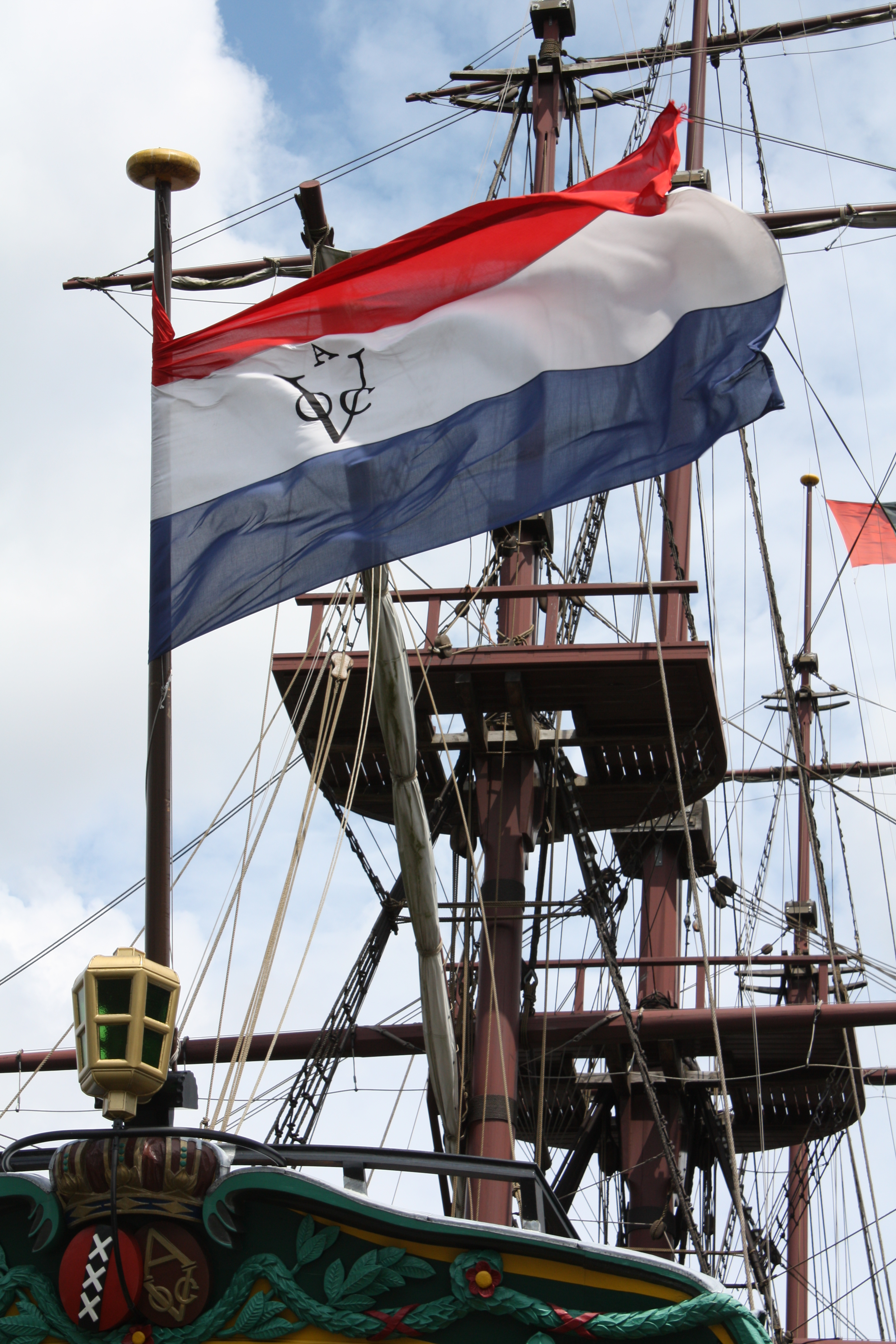
Replica of an East Indiaman of the Dutch East India Company/United East India Company (VOC).

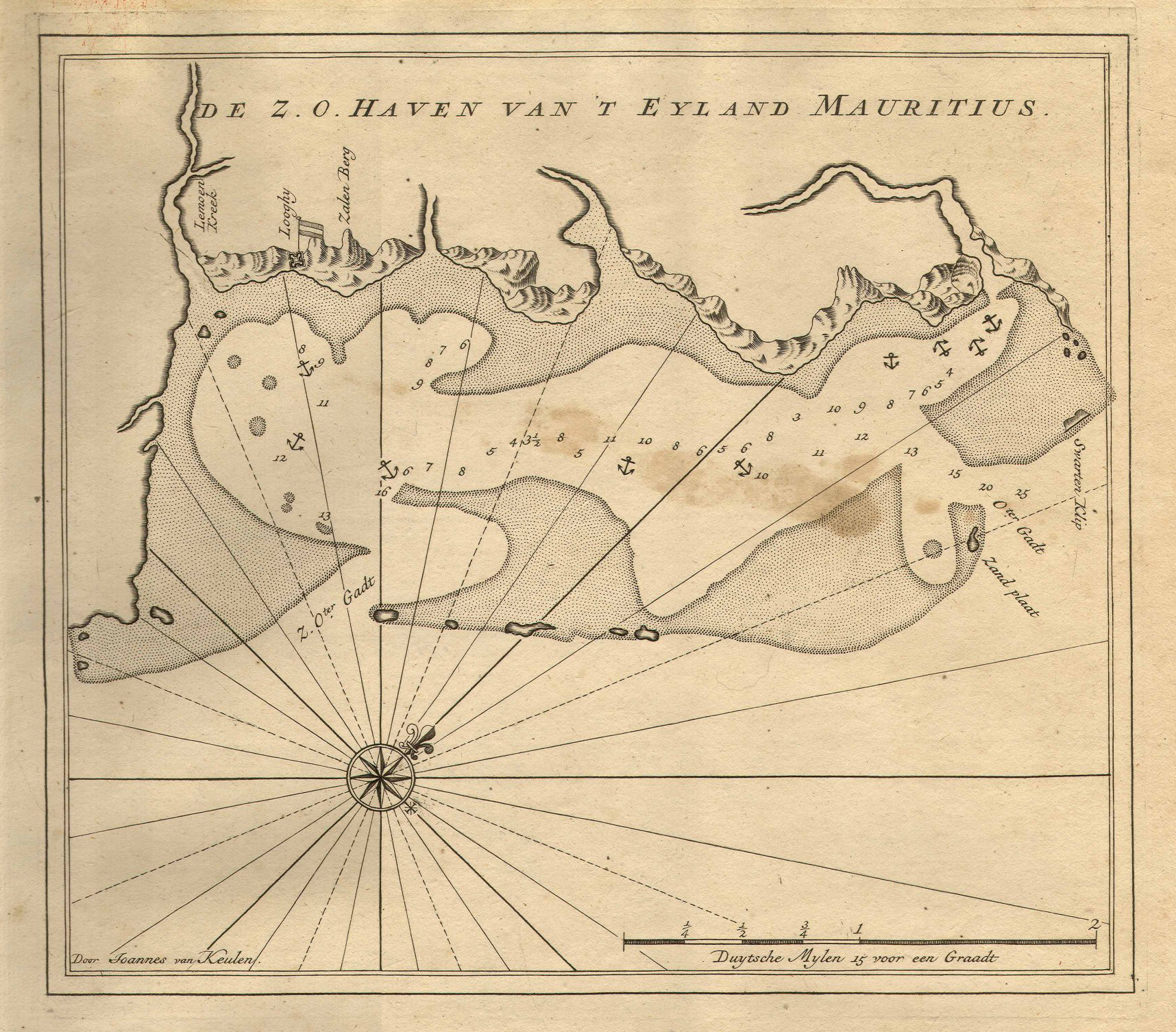
Dutch map of a coast of Mauritius

In 1598, a Dutch expedition consisting of eight ships set sail from the port of Texel (Netherlands) under the orders of admirals Jacob Cornelisz van Neck and Wybrand van Warwijck towards the Indian subcontinent. The eight ships ran into foul weather after passing the Cape of Good Hope and were separated. Three found their way to the northeast of Madagascar while the remaining five regrouped and sailed in a southeasterly direction. On 17 September, the five ships under the orders of Admiral Van Warwyck came into view of the island.

On 20 September, they entered a sheltered bay which they gave the name of "Port de Warwick" (present name is "Grand Port"). They landed and decided to name the island "Prins Maurits van Nassaueiland", after Prince Maurits (Latin version: Mauritius) of the House of Nassau, the stadtholder of the provinces of the Dutch Republic except for Friesland, but also after the main vessel of the fleet which was called "Mauritius". From those days, only the name Mauritius has remained. On 2 October, the ships took to the sea again towards Bantam.

From then on, the island's "Port de Warwick" was used by the Dutch as a stopover after long months at sea. In 1606, two expeditions came for the first time to what would later become Port-Louis in the northwest part of the island. The expedition, consisting of eleven ships and 1,357 men under the orders of Admiral Neck came into the bay, which they named "Rade des Tortues" (literally meaning "Harbor of the Tortoises") because of the great number of terrestrial tortoises they found there.

From that date, Dutch sailors shifted their choice to "Rade des Tortues" as harbor. In 1615, the shipwrecking and death of governor Pieter Both, who was coming back from India with four richly laden ships in the bay, caused the route to be considered as cursed by Dutch sailors and they tried to avoid it as much as possible. In the meantime, the English and the Danes were beginning to make incursions into the Indian Ocean. Those who landed on the island freely cut and took with them the precious heartwood of the ebony trees, then found in profusion all over the island.

=== Dutch colonisation (1638–1710) ===
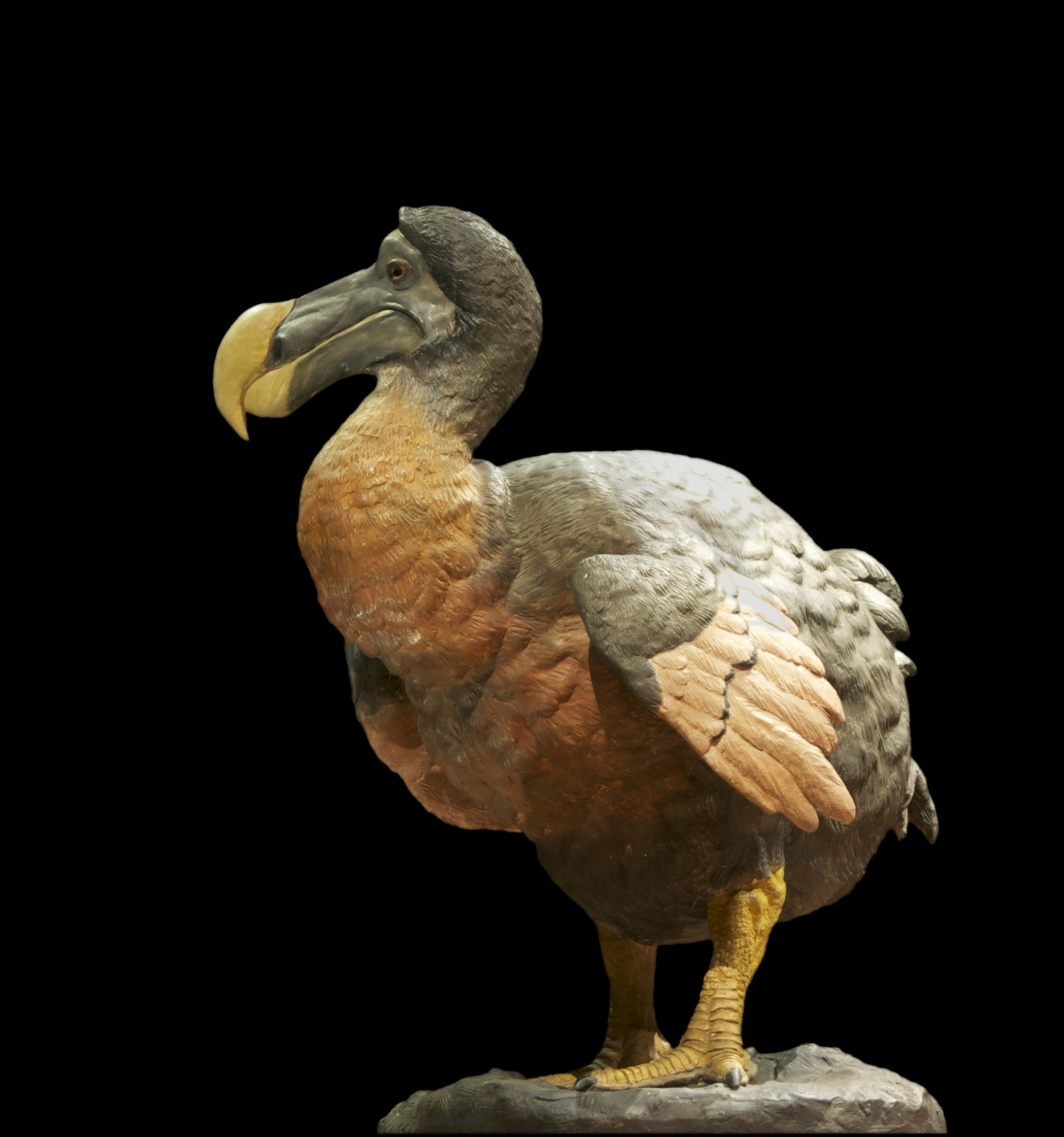
A representation of the extinct dodo bird. Dutch presence on the island largely contributed to the extinction of this endemic bird.

Dutch colonisation started in 1638 and ended in 1710, with a brief interruption between 1658 and 1666. Numerous governors were appointed, but continuous hardships such as cyclones, droughts, pest infestations, lack of food and illnesses finally took their toll, and the island was definitively abandoned in 1710.

The island was not permanently inhabited for the forty years after its discovery by the Dutch, but in 1638 Cornelius Gooyer established the first permanent Dutch settlement in Mauritius with a garrison of twenty-five. He thus became the first governor of the island. In 1639, thirty more men came to reinforce the Dutch colony. Gooyer was instructed to develop the commercial potential of the island, but he did nothing of the sort, so he was recalled.

=== Malagasy slavery ===
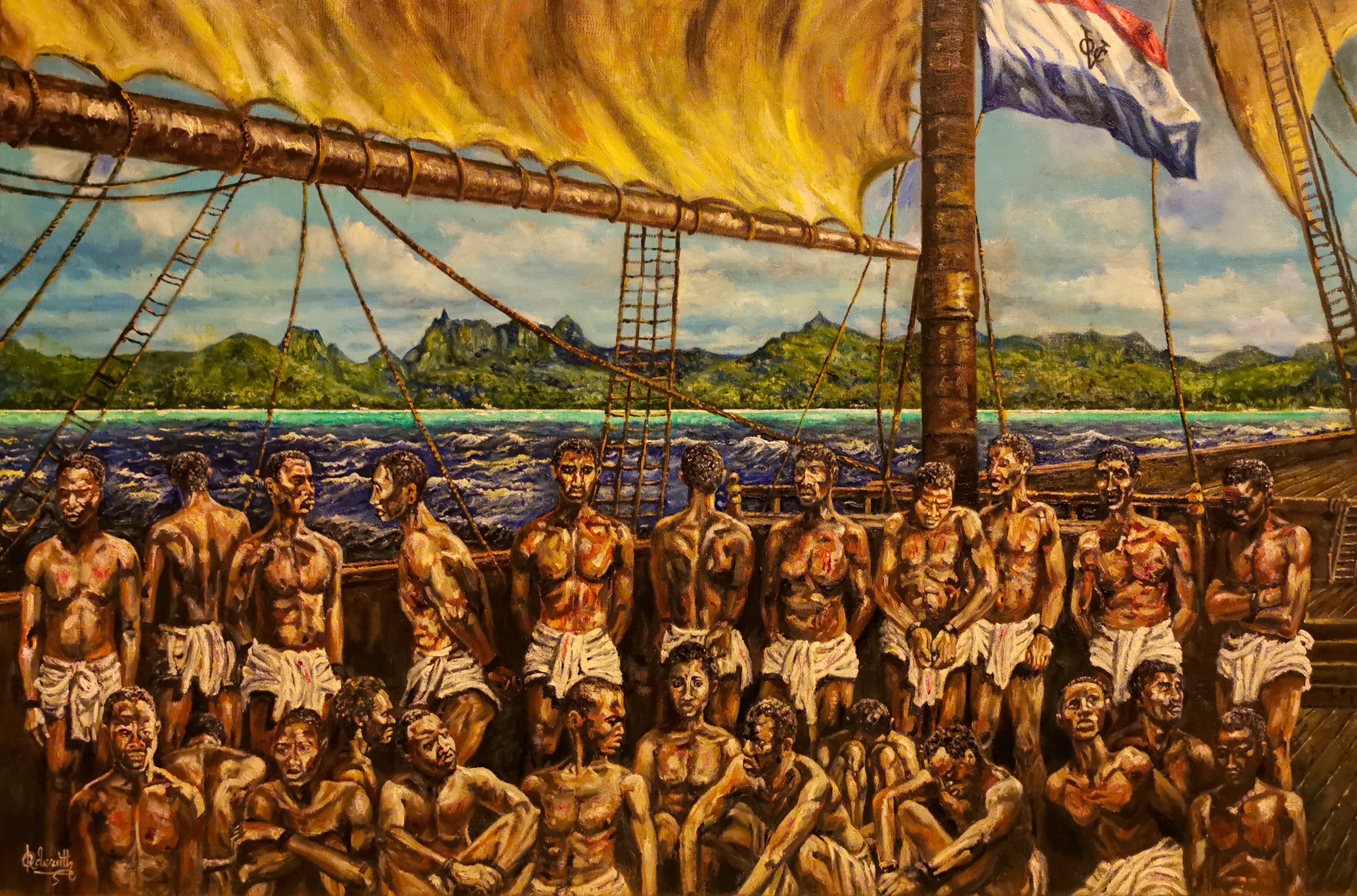
Artist: Raouf Oderuth

Gooyer's successor was Adriaan van der Stel who began the development in earnest, developing the export of ebony wood. For the purpose, Van der Stel brought 105 Malagasy slaves to the island. Within the first week, about sixty slaves were able to run away into the forests; only about twenty of them would be recaptured.

In 1644, the islanders were faced with many months of hardships, due to delayed shipment of supplies, bad harvests and cyclones. During those months, the colonists could only rely on themselves by fishing and hunting. Nonetheless, Van der Stel secured the shipment of 95 more slaves from Madagascar, before being transferred to Ceylon. His replacement was Jacob van der Meersch. In 1645, the latter brought in 108 more Malagasy slaves. Van der Meersch left Mauritius in September 1648 and was replaced by Reinier Por.

In 1652, more hardships befell the colonists, masters and slaves alike. The population was then about a hundred people. The continuing hardships affected the commercial potential of the island and a pullout was ordered in 1657. On 16 July 1658, almost all the inhabitants left the island, except for a ship's boy and two slaves who had taken shelter in the forests. Thus the first attempt at colonization by the Dutch ended badly.

=== Further Dutch attempts at colonisation ===
In 1664, a second attempt was made, but this one also ended badly as the men chosen for the job abandoned their sick commander, Van Niewland, without proper treatment, and he died.

From 1666 to 1669, Dirk Jansz Smient administered the new colony at Grand Port, with the cutting down and export of Ebony trees as the main activity. When Dirk Jansz Smient left, he was replaced by George Frederik Wreeden. The latter died in 1672, drowned with five other colonists during a reconnaissance expedition. His replacement would be Hubert Hugo. The later was a man of vision and wanted to make the island into an agricultural colony. His vision was not shared by his superiors, and eventually he could not fully develop his vision.

Issac Johannes Lamotius became the new governor when Hugo left in 1677. Lamotius governed until 1692, when he was deported to Batavia for judgment for persecuting a colonist whose wife had refused his courtship. Thus in 1692 a new governor, Roelof Deodati, was appointed. In 1693 Deodati exiled the French Protestant François Leguat and five of his followers for two years on Ile aux Fouquets after that Leguat's group had reached Mauritius from Rodrigues. Even if he tried to develop the island, Deodati faced many problems, like cyclones, pest infestations, cattle illnesses and droughts. Discouraged, Deodati eventually gave up and his replacement would be Abraham Momber Van de Velde. The latter fared no better and eventually became the last Dutch governor of the island for that period. Thus the Dutch definitely abandoned the island in 1710.

== Legacy ==
The Dutch provided the name for the country and for many regions over the whole island. Some examples include the "Pieter Both" mountain, the "Vandermeersh" region near Rose-Hill as well as many other names. They also introduced sugar cane plants from Java. Less admirable was the decimation by the Dutch of the local dodo and giant tortoise population for food, also aided by the introduction of competing species and pests. Large areas of forest were cut for ebony bark exploitation.

In 1948 a monument and plaque was erected in Ferney, Vieux Grand Port to commemorate the first Dutch landing which had taken place 350 years earlier. The monument is located next to abandoned buildings which were built by the settlers using granite stone blocks. Recently there has been partial restoration of the ruins and the name Fort Frederik Hendrik has been restored to the site. On 18 November 2010, the Frederik Hendrik Museum was opened by Ad Koekkoek, ambassador of the Netherlands in Tanzania, and Mookhesswur Choonee, Minister of Culture of Mauritius.

== See also ==
- Opperhoofd of Mauritius
