= Governor of Isle de France (Mauritius) =

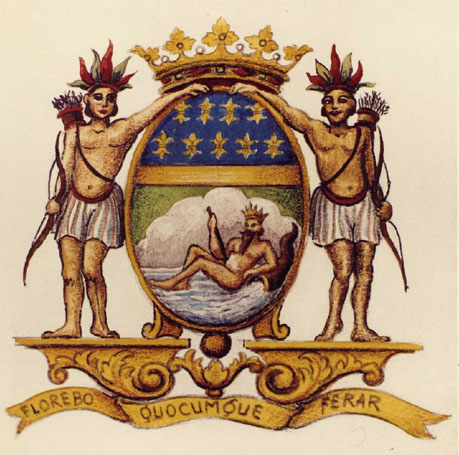
- Coat of arms of the French East India Company
- Residence: Château de Réduit
- Precursor: Governor of Dutch Mauritius
- Formation: 24 December 1721; 304 years ago
- First holder: Julien Duronguët le Toullec
- Final holder: Louis Léger
- Abolished: 3 December 1810; 215 years ago
- Succession: Governor of British Mauritius

The governor of Isle de France was an official who ruled Isle de France (now Republic of Mauritius) during the French colonial period between 1721 and 1810. After the Dutch abandoned Mauritius, the island became a French colony in September 1715 when Guillaume Dufresne d'Arsel landed and took possession of it, naming the island Isle de France. The French government turned over the administration of Mauritius to the French East India Company, but the island remained bereft of Europeans until 1721. Furthermore, until 1735, Isle de France was administered from Île Bourbon, now known as Réunion.

== List of governors (1721-1810) ==
A list of French governors and governors-general of the country from 1721 to 1810.

No.	Portrait	Incumbent	Tenure	
No.	Portrait	Incumbent	Took office	Left office
Governors of the Compagnie des Indes
		Julien Duronguët le Toullec; Acting	24 December 1721	7 April 1722
1		Denis, chevalier de Nyon	7 April 1722	16 December 1725
		Duval de Hauville; Acting for Nyon	7 April 1722	16 December 1725
		Jacques Gast d'Hauterive; Acting for Nyon	13 July 1722	3 December 1722
		Denis de Brousse; Acting	16 December 1725	13 March 1729
2		Pierre Benoît Dumas	13 March 1729	20 August 1729
3		Nicolas de Maupin	20 August 1729	4 June 1735
Governor-general of the Compagnie des Indes
4		Mahé de La Bourdonnais	4 June 1735	23 March 1746
		Didier de Saint-Martin; Acting for La Bourdonnais	20 March 1740	14 August 1741
		Didier de Saint-Martin; Acting for La Bourdonnais	14 August 1741	18 December 1742
		Didier de Saint-Martin; Acting	23 March 1746	6 October 1746
5		Pierre Félix Barthélemy David	6 October 1746	10 February 1753
6		Jean-Baptiste Charles Bouvet de Lozier	10 February 1753	3 December 1755
7		René Magon de la Villebague	3 December 1755	4 November 1759
8		Antoine Marie Desforges-Boucher	4 November 1759	14 July 1767
Governor-general of the Mascarene Islands
9		Jean-Daniel Dumas	14 July 1767	27 November 1768
		Jean Guillaume Steinauer; Acting	27 November 1768	6 June 1769
10		François Julien du Dresnay	6 June 1769	23 August 1772
11		Charles-Henri-Louis d'Arsac de Ternay	23 August 1772	2 December 1776
12		Antoine de Guiran, chevalier de La Brillanne	2 December 1776	28 April 1779
		Joseph Murinais, comte de Saint-Maurice; Acting	28 April 1779	30 April 1779
		François, vicomte de Souillac; Acting	1 May 1779	30 January 1780
13		François, vicomte de Souillac	30 January 1780	3 November 1787
		Camille Charles Leclerc, Chevalier de Fresne; Acting for Souillac	5 April 1785	28 June 1785
		François de Fleury; Acting for Souillac	28 June 1785	7 November 1785
14		Antoine Bruni d'Entrecasteaux	5 November 1787	14 November 1789
15		Thomas Conway	14 November 1789	29 July 1790
		Dominique Prosper de Chermont; Acting	29 July 1790	19 August 1790
		David Charpentier de Cossigny; Acting	19 August 1790	18 June 1792
16		Anne Joseph Hippolyte de Maurès, Comte de Malartic	18 June 1792	28 July 1800
17		François Louis Magallon de la Morlière	28 July 1800	3 February 1803
18		Charles Mathieu Isidore Decaen	26 September 1803	3 December 1810
Prefect
19		Louis Léger	26 September 1803	3 December 1810

== See also ==
- Governor of Mauritius
