= Abraham Momber van de Velde =

Dutch politician

Abraham Momber, also known as Abraham Momber van de Velde, was the last commander (opperhoofd) of the Dutch East India Company (Dutch: Vereenigde Oostindische Compagnie, commonly abbreviated to VOC) settlement on Mauritius. He followed Roelof Deodati as the de facto Dutch governor on November 25, 1703. On November 15, 1707, the VOC's premises, goods, and administration were almost entirely destroyed by a fire.

The same year, instructions were received from the VOC to abandon the island. Carthago and Mercurius sailed to Mauritius in September 1708 for transporting people and their effects to either Batavia or the Cape. Carthago continued onto Batavia, whereas Mercurius arrived at the Cape with most families on 26 January 1709.

After destroying everything they could not take with them in order to prevent the abandoned station to be of service to anyone else, Momber and his garrison left on January 25, 1710, to Batavia on the ship Beverwaart. The next colonial governor did not arrive until 1715 with Guillaume Dufresne d' Arsel of the French East India Company.

Preceded by Roelof Deodati	Governor of Mauritius; 1703–1710	Succeeded by Guillaume Dufresne d' Arsel
