= Roelof Diodati =

Dutch politician

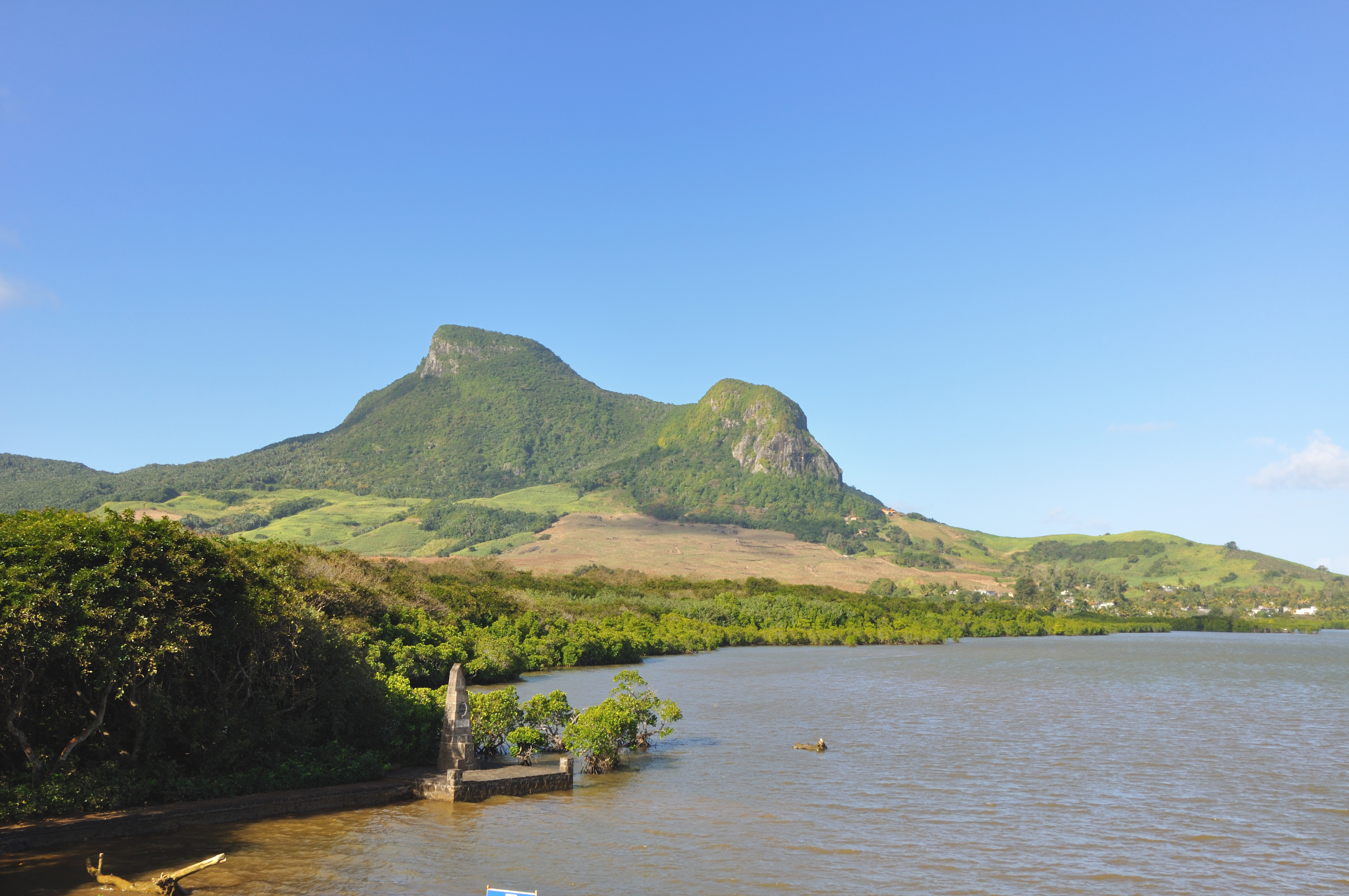
Mauritius

Roelof Diodati (Dordrecht, 28 July 1658 – Batavia, 10 March 1723) was a governor of Dutch Mauritius in the late 17th century.

== Life ==
Diodati was of Swiss-Italian descent. His grandfather was Jean Diodati, a theologian, who translated the Bible into Italian. His father, born in Geneva, became a pastor of the Walloon church in Leiden in 1651.

It is not obvious Rodolfo Diodati was one of a twin. Both brothers took service at the Dutch East India Company. He became an accountant at the Cape in 1686 and then a merchant. He was appointed as governor of Mauritius from 1692 to 1703. In 1693 he had to deal with François Leguat. In 1695, a big hurricane devastated the island, several of the Burghers lost all their crops, and many left the island.

Diodati seems to have been appointed in Suratte. Then he shifted to Batavia and he became a merchant and accountant on 4 January 1707. In 1709 he married Catharina Zaaiman, born on Dutch Mauritius. Her grandmother was Eva, a Khoikhoi interpreter for Jan van Riebeeck.

Diodati became opperhoofd at the VOC post at Dejima Japan on 31 May 1720 and died in Batavia 10 March 1723.

== Notes ==
Preceded by Isaac Johannes Lamotius	Governor of Dutch Mauritius; 1692–1703	Succeeded by Abraham Momber van de Velde
