= Jacob van der Meersch =

Dutch politician

Jacob van der Meersch was governor of Mauritius from 1644 to 1648. He was succeeded by Reinier Por. Before van der Meersch, the governor was Adriaen van der Stel.

During his time as governor, progress was made in the domain of wood-cutting and a 5 kilometer road was built.
