= Charles Mathieu Isidore Decaen =

French Army officer and colonial administrator (1769–1832)

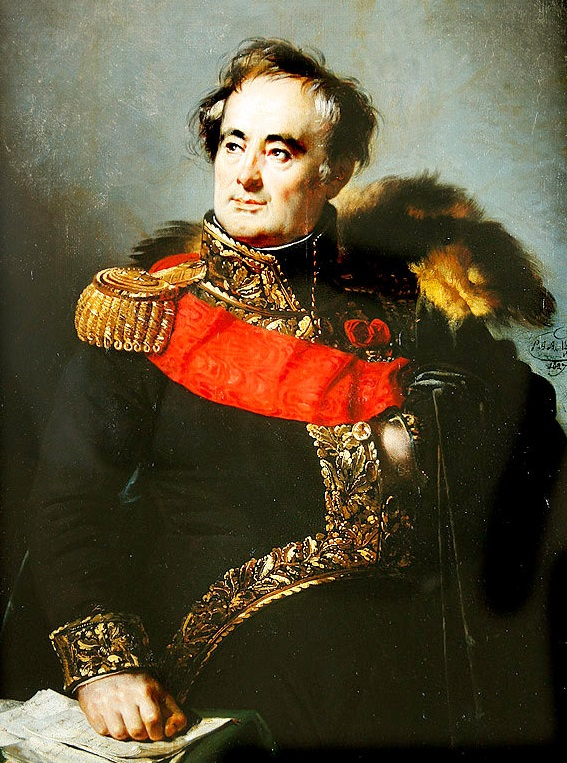
1827 portrait of Decaen

Charles Mathieu Isidore Decaen (French pronunciation: [ʃaʁl matjø izidɔʁ dəkɑ̃]; 13 April 1769 – 9 September 1832) was a French Army officer and colonial administrator who served as the governor of Isle de France from 1803 to 1810. He also served as the governor of French India from 1802 to 1803 and saw extensive military service in the French Revolutionary and Napoleonic Wars.

== French Revolution ==
Decaen, born in Caen, served as a gunner in the French Navy before the French Revolution. In 1792 Decaen enlisted in the Calvados battalion. He served under Kléber in the siege of Mainz. Promoted to adjudant-general, Decaen served in the uprising of the Vendée. He fought under the generals Canclaux, Dubayet, Moreau and Kléber. Promoted to general of brigade, Decaen was captured in the attack on Frantzenthal. After having given his parole he was exchanged.

In 1796 he served under Moreau in the operations near the Rhine and he distinguished himself in the passage of the river and the siege of Kehl, for which he was awarded a sword of honor by the French Directory. In 1800 he captured Munich and that December he commanded a division in the Battle of Hohenlinden. In that battle, he reacted "confidently and aggressively" in a confusing situation in heavy forest during a snowstorm. His attack defeated the southernmost Austrian column and contributed greatly to the overall French success. For his role at Hohenlinden he was promoted to general of division (Major-General).

== Service to the Empire ==
=== In Pondicherry ===
Possibly singled out for "exile" by Napoleon Bonaparte for his association with Moreau's Army of the Rhine, Decaen was sent on a difficult mission to the French establishment in India in 1802. From 1803 to 1810, he oversaw the defence of Réunion (which Decaen rename Isle Bonaparte in 1806) and Isle de France against the British. Overwhelmed by superior numbers, he surrendered during the British invasion of Isle de France in late 1810. He released Matthew Flinders from house arrest in April 1810, a few months before the Battle of Grand Port (August) and the capitulation to the British on 3 December of the same year.

=== Spain and fall of the Empire ===
Upon his return he was made a count and made the head of the Army of Catalonia from October 1811 to January 1814, fighting in Spain. From his headquarters in Barcelona, he reported to Marshal Louis Gabriel Suchet. He formed the Catalan guides and gained their high regard. At Suchet's request, he sent the troops who raised the Siege of Tarragona. Decaen also helped Suchet in his victory at Ordal. In 1814, he tried in vain to keep the British out of Bordeaux. After the first abdication of Napoléon I he recognized Louis XVIII and he was appointed as governor of the 11th military division (Bordeaux). Decaen made an unsuccessful effort to maintain the royal authority in that city after the return of Napoleon I from Elba in 1815.

After the royal princes had left France, Decaen rejoined the emperor's side and during the Hundred Days, he commanded troops in the south of France, for which he was imprisoned for five months after the Bourbon restoration which occurred after Waterloo. After his release he retired to civil life until he was recalled to activity by Louis-Philippe I in 1830. He died two years later.

== Honours ==
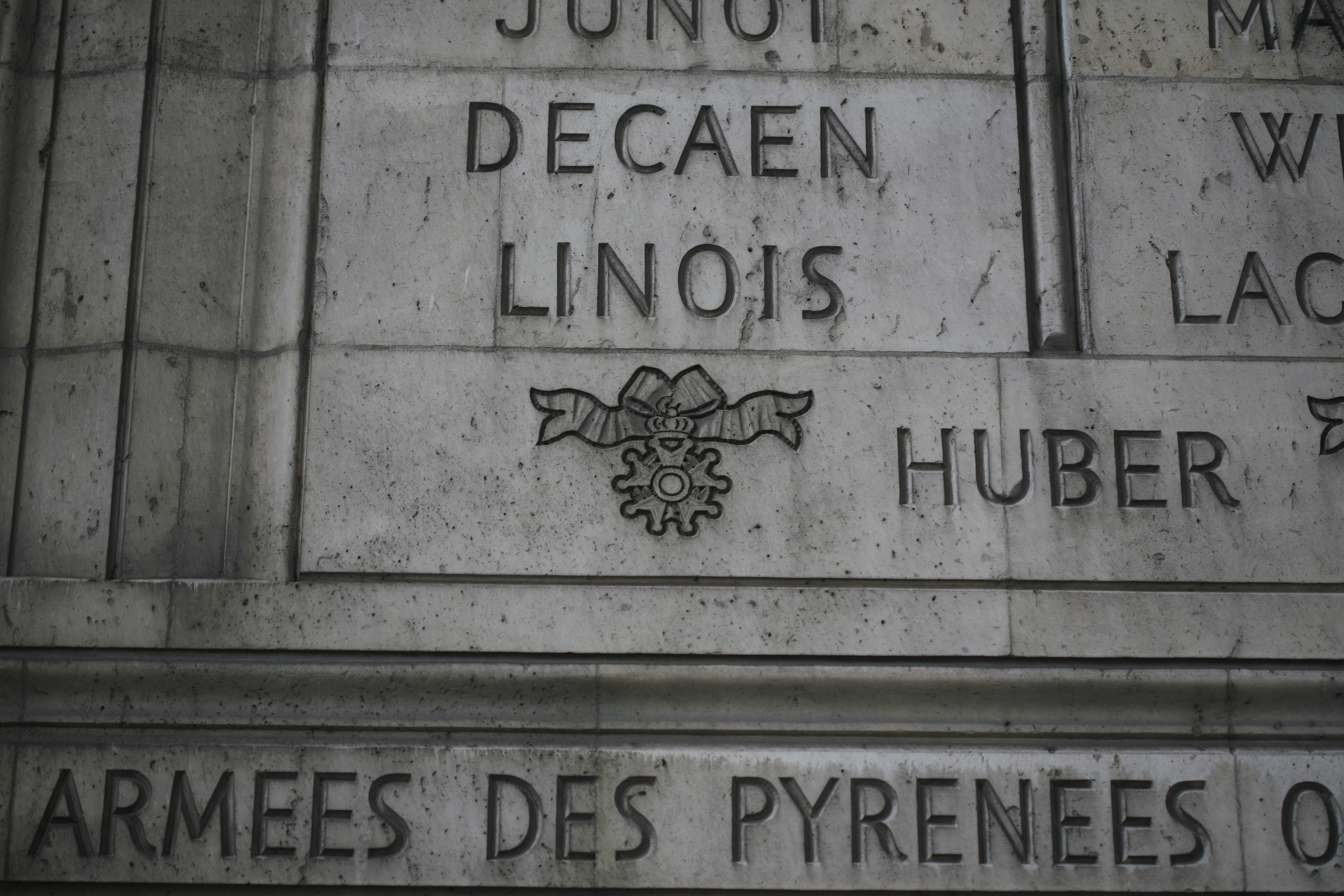
Inscription on the Arc de Triomphe (western pillar, column 33)

- Name inscribed on the Arc de Triomphe

== Titles ==
Government offices
Preceded by British occupation	Governor of French India; 18 June 1802–August 1803	Succeeded by Louis Binot
Preceded by François Louis Magallon de la Morlière	Governor of Isle de France; 26 September 1803–3 December 1810	Succeeded by British occupation
