= Reinier Por =

Dutch politician

Reinier or Reiner Por (died 7 January 1653 at Fort Frederik Hendrik, near Mahébourg) was the Dutch opperhoofd or governor of Mauritius from 1648 to 1653. Five years after his death the first Dutch colony was briefly abandoned, to be re-established at the same location in Grand Port in 1666.

== See also ==
- List of colonial heads of Mauritius
- Dutch colonization of Mauritius (1638-1710)
