= Dirk Jansz Smient =

Dutch politician

Dirk Jansz Smient was governor of Mauritius in the new settlement at Grand Port from 1666 to 1669, when he returned to Cape of Good Hope. He was replaced by George Frederik Wreede. In November 1676 he led a punitive expedition from Cape Town to a group of Hottentots led by Chief Goenema, which failed as they could not be located.

Preceded by Jacobus Nieuwland	Governor of Mauritius; 1664–1669	Succeeded by George Frederik Wreede
