= Georg Friedrich Wreede =

Dutch governor of Mauritius

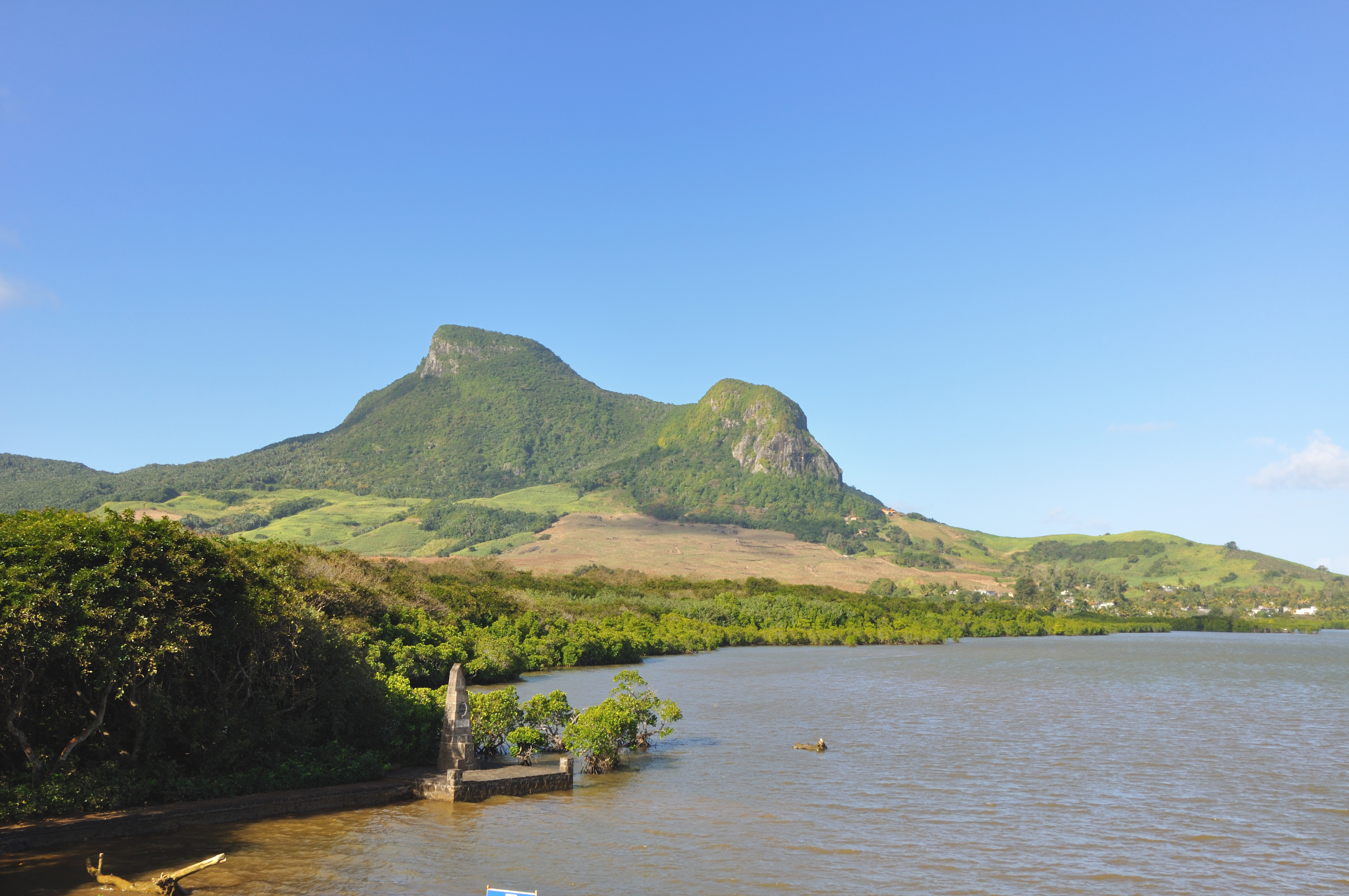
Mauritius

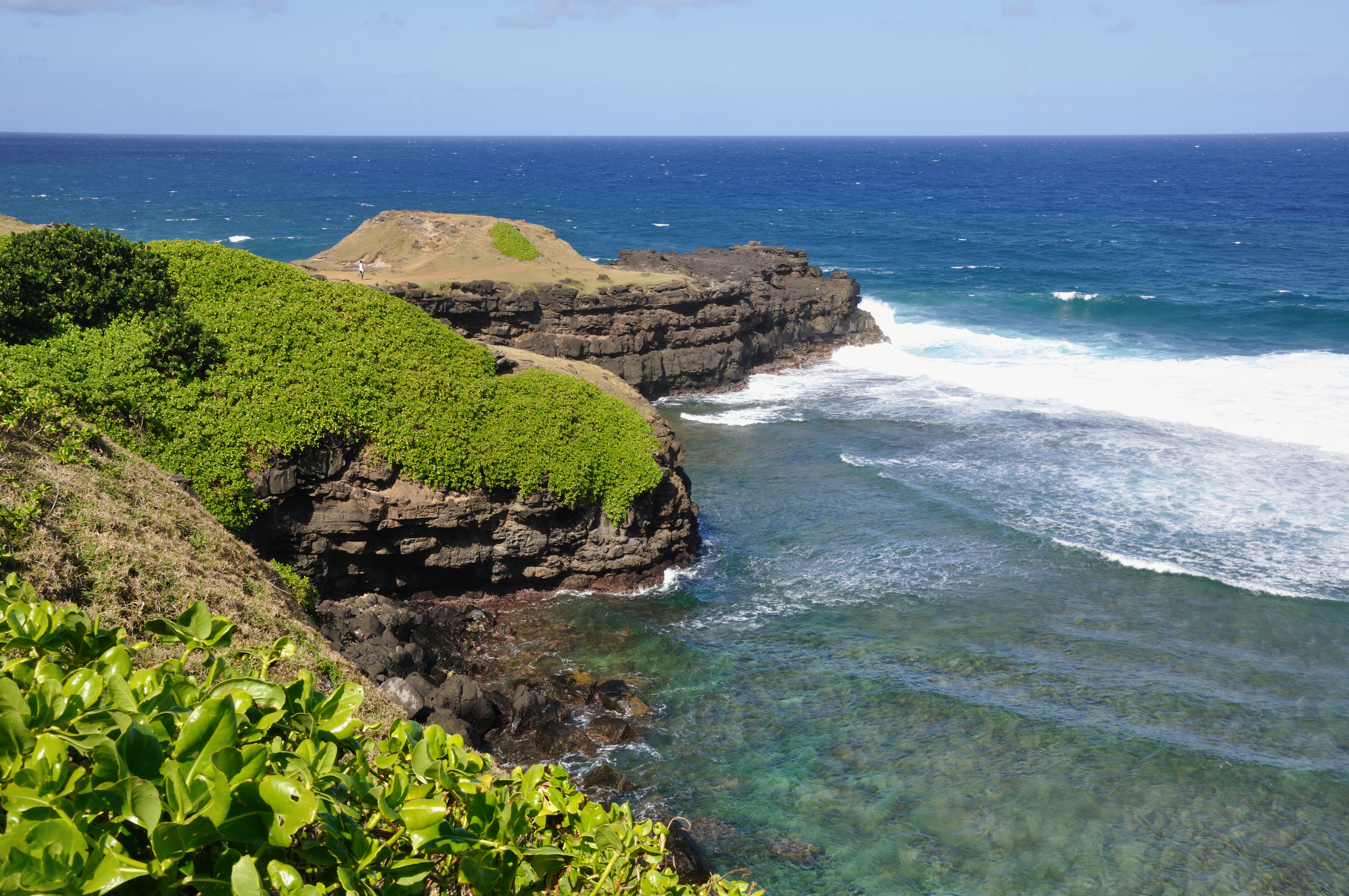
The coast

Georg Friedrich Wreede or Georgius Fredericius Wreede (died on 29 February 1672) was governor of Dutch Mauritius from 1665 to 1672, with a break between 1668-1669.

Wreede was born around 1635 in Uetze near Hannover, in Germany. In 1659 he arrived at Cape of Good Hope as an employee of the Dutch East India Company (Dutch: Vereenigde Oostindische Compagnie, commonly abbreviated to VOC). He had been a student in Philology in Helmstedt and within four years of his arrival he had written a compendium using the Greek alphabet on Khoikhoi – then called Hottentot – consisting of sentences with Dutch translations. The "list" was sent to Amsterdam, but never published and has disappeared. Possibly it was sent to Hiob Ludolf, who was a famous linguist, and in contact with Nicolaes Witsen. Christian Juncker published Ludolf's biography with a list of Hottentots-Latin words.

In 1660 he took part in an expedition to the Olifants River. In February 1665 he was sent by Zacharias Wagenaer on an expedition to look if Martin Vaz could be used by ships, and returned in May with charts. The Pimpel went on to Mauritius and Wreede was appointed by the captain as the new governor. For three months the twelve men on the island had been without rice or brandy. In October 1668, the captain of the visiting Poelsnip using his discretion relieved Wreede of his duty following formal complaints by his men, and removed him from the island to be held accountable to the VOC for his actions. Dirk Jansz Smient was appointed to replace him.

Wreede was sent to Saldanha Bay where the French East India Company had planned a base, after leaving Madagascar. On 6 June 1669 Georg Wreede took command of the post and brought with him a carpenter. They erected a VOC monogram on each of the five islands in Saldanha Bay. A month later Wreede was transferred. In October 1669 he was back on the island Mauritius.

Wreede drowned in 1672 while sailing intoxicated. He was eventually replaced by Hubert Hugo.

In 1688 Olfert Dapper probably used Wreede's observations but did not mention his source.

Preceded by Dirk Jansz Smient	Governor of Mauritius; 1669–1672	Succeeded by Hubert Hugo
