= Governor of Mauritius =

Mauritius has been administered by various colonial heads since it was discovered until it became an independent state;

- Governor of Dutch Mauritius (Opperhoofd of Mauritius) – 1598 to 1718
- Governor of Isle de France (Mauritius) (Gouverneur d'Isle de France) – 1721 to 1810
- Governor of British Mauritius (Governor of Mauritius) – 1810 to 1968

== See also ==
- Governor-General of Mauritius – 1968 to 1992
- President of Mauritius – 1992 to present
- Prime Minister of Mauritius – 1968 to present
- Queen of Mauritius – 1968 to 1992
