= Adriaan van der Stel =

Dutch governor of Mauritius from 1640 to 1645

Opperhoofd of Dutch Mauritius
- In office 1640–1645
- Preceded by: Cornelius Gooyer
- Succeeded by: Jacob van der Meersch

Personal details
- Born: 1610; Dordrecht, Netherlands
- Died: 24 May 1646; Dutch Ceylon
- Spouse: Maria Lievens (m. c. 1637)
- Parent(s): Simon Van der Stel (father); Maria Adriaens Estella (mother)

Adriaan van der Stel (died 25 May 1646 in Ceylon) was the opperhoofd of Mauritius from 1640 to 1645. He was succeeded by Jacob van der Meersch.

Adriaan Van Der Stel succeeded Governor Cornelius Gooyer. He landed on the island with seventy men, of whom forty were invalids. The latter thought that they would recover their health. Twenty-three died and the rest returned to Batavia. Van der Stel brought with him various seeds and fruits including sugarcane saplings. He also brought rabbits, sheep, geese, ducks, pigeons and stags. After some years, these animals multiplied and were sources of fresh provisions to passing ships. A mineralogist was sent to the island to make a survey on the island and in 1641 the Company directors sent the ship Petten with the orders to Van der Stel that he should cut all ebony trees on the island. To carry out the task, Van der Stel needed more men. He went to Madagascar where he obtained one hundred and five slaves. but within a few weeks, fifty-two ran away and only eighteen were caught. For about three years Van der Stel and his men were able to send six thousand pieces of ebony to Batavia. He also gave great attention to agriculture. Rice, indigo, tobacco and cane cultivation were started. Many fruit trees and vegetables were grown. But in spite of these efforts, their supply of food was not guaranteed. In 1644 a cyclone destroyed the fort and their cultivation. They had to wait for months for a ship from Batavia, and in the meantime they had to go in the woods to search for food.

His son Simon would become the first Governor of the Cape of Good Hope.
