= Cornelius Gooyer =

Dutch politician

Cornelius Gooyer was a Dutchman who established a settlement in Mauritius. He served as the island's governor from 1638 to 1639. He was succeeded by Adriaan van der Stel.
