= Hubert Hugo =

Dutch pirate and colonial chief of Mauritius

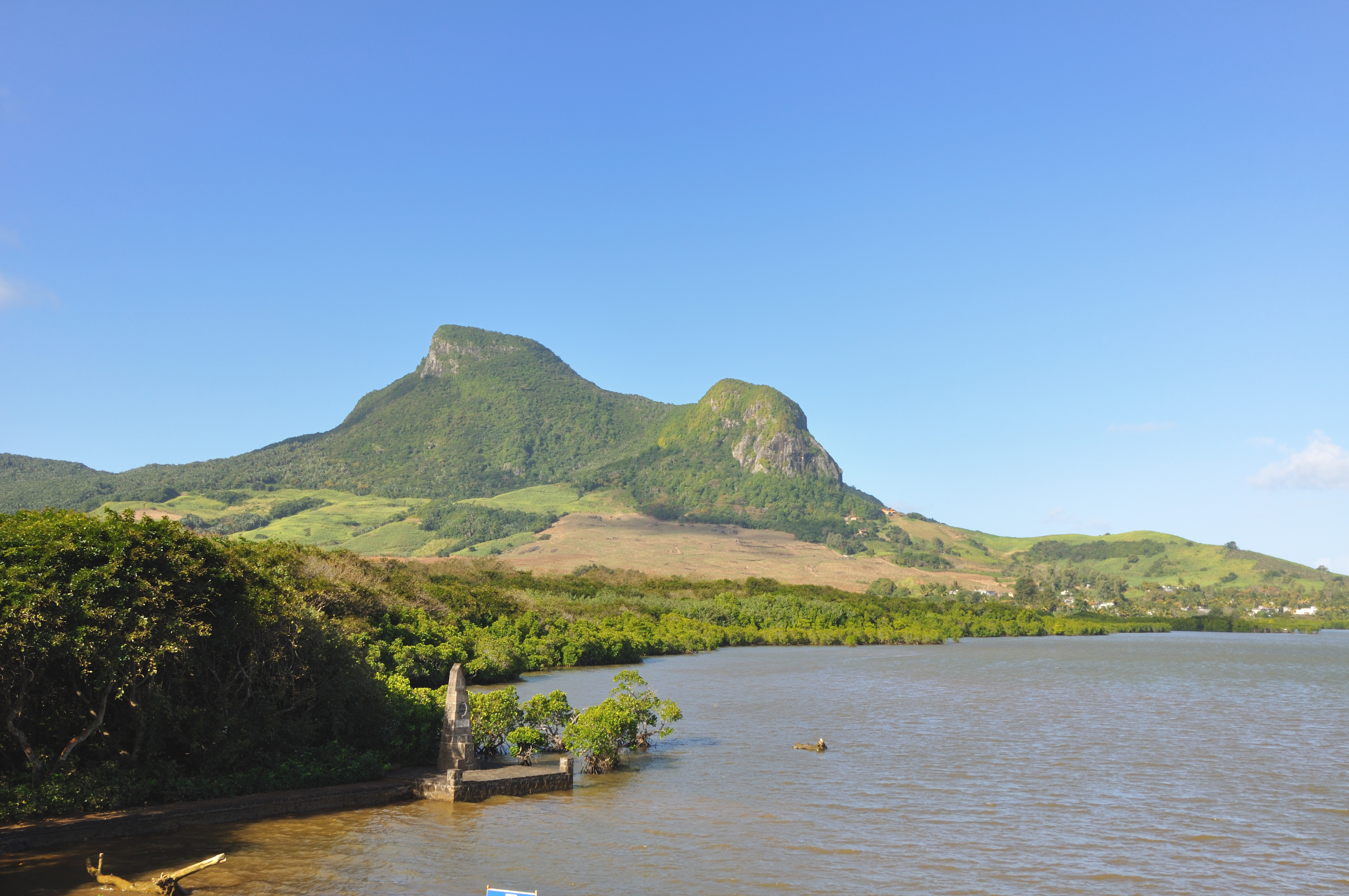
SE coast of Mauritius, view of Vieux Grand Port, site of Fort Frederik Hendrik

Hubert Hugo (Delfshaven/Rotterdam, circa 1618 – Batavia (?), 1678) served as a merchant for the Dutch East India Company (VOC) from 1640 to 1654 in Gujarat. He later turned to privateering or piracy in the Arabian Sea and the Gulf of Aden around 1662. In 1664, he was acquitted by the States of Holland and returned to the service of the VOC. He served as commander of Mauritius until 1677. In 1674 he became one of the last people to document the presence of the dodo on Mauritius.

Merchant in Gujarat

Hubert Gerritsz Hugo was born around 1618 in Delfshaven. On January 20, 1640, he set sail in the service of the VOC Chamber of Zeeland on the ship Zeelandia bound for Batavia. He was hired as an assistant, the entry-level position for qualified servants. He was then stationed in Suratte, the major port city of the Mughal Empire, where the company had been purchasing indigo and dyed and printed cotton fabrics (lywaten) since 1616, which could be exchanged for spices in the Moluccas. In 1645, Hugo was promoted to junior merchant, and in 1649, he became a full merchant. He traveled extensively in the region for the procurement of indigo and lywaten. He served, as it was later stated, 'many years in the service of the Noble Company there.' In 1652, he was appointed as the chief of the establishment in Ahmedabad, just north of Suratte. A year later, he expressed his desire to repatriate, and he and his family left for Batavia. As vice-commander of Huybert de Lairesse's return fleet from November 1654, he returned to the Republic on the ship Terschelling.

The French Privateer

Afterward, Hugo settled in Dordrecht, specifically on Voorstraat near Nieuwkerkstraat. In this area, several individuals were involved in privateering and piracy activities at the time, including Simon de Danser and Laurens de Graaf. Laurens Davidsz van Convent lived nearby. Together with him and six other investors, Hugo had a frigate built and equipped in Zaandam for privateering in the Arabian Sea. This region, familiar to Hugo, had a history of piracy on the trade and pilgrimage routes between Gujarat, the Persian Gulf, and the Red Sea. Legally, they obtained a letter of marque from the French Duke Caesar de Bourbon of Vendôme, a son of the French King Henry IV. Hugo was to be the commander, and Van Convent the captain. The ship was named De Zeven Provinciën.

Commander of the pirate vessel L'Aigle Noir

On August 20, 1661, the ship set sail, ostensibly for trade on the coast of Guinea and in the West Indies, with an unsuspecting crew on board. At sea, beyond Texel, Hugo and Van Convent came on board with a pilot boat. In the next port, Le Havre in France, another 40 armed Frenchmen joined them. When the Dutch sailors suspected foul play and revolted, they were brutally suppressed. Four of them were flogged and imprisoned. Since the letter of marque stated the ship's name as L'Aigle Noir, or the Black Eagle, they repainted De Zeven Provinciën's name at sea. Rounding the southern tip of Africa, the Black Eagle sailed past the Cape of Good Hope to the bay of Saint Augustine on Madagascar. From there, the ship roamed near the Red Sea in early 1662, capturing several vessels. The most significant prize was a pilgrim ship belonging to the Queen of Bijapur, loaded with treasures destined for Mecca and Medina. Near Mocha, eight sailors managed to escape when they went ashore to find drinking water. In Mocha, the Ottoman governor refused to pay ransom for the captured ships, which were then set on fire. Several ships sent by the governor, manned with soldiers, stood no chance against the Black Eagle's 36 cannons. Many of them were lost.

Meanwhile, complaints about piracy were received in Suratte, and both the Dutch and English were summoned by the Mughal governor of Suratte. VOC director Dirck van Adrichem, who was at that time on an embassy at the court of Aurangzeb in Delhi, was also questioned, but he managed to make it clear that the VOC was not responsible.

Consequences

Loaded with booty (approximately 4 to 5 tons of gold), the Black Eagle visited the island of Mauritius on its way back, where they encountered the return fleet of Arnold de Vlaming van Oudshoorn. De Vlaming had lost four ships in a storm on the way, and part of the crew of the Arnhem had been saved. Hugo managed to persuade over 30 of them to come on board his ship. They then crossed the Atlantic to the Caribbean Sea. Here, they captured an English ship loaded with around 2,500 hides, which had been previously seized by the Dutch West India Company. The most valuable goods were brought to the Republic, and the hides were taken to France. Both pirates were arrested in the summer of 1663. Van Convent was sentenced to 30 years of hard labor in Dordrecht but soon managed to escape to Le Havre. Hugo was acquitted in France. The French ambassador in the Netherlands requested the States-General to send the stolen goods to France, claiming they belonged to France, but Hugo had already secured most of them.

End of his pirate career

In Asia, the VOC disseminated the text of the French letter of marque everywhere, making it clear that it was an expedition of a 'French rover,' and that everything 'that he has done and still intends to do, is without our authorization and knowledge.' In the Republic, the States-General protested the letter of marque to the French, in which the Duke of Vendôme 'declares all Moors and Indian nations as enemies.' This led to activities that tarnished the company's reputation. Because many expected Hugo to return, they instructed all ships in the vicinity of the Red Sea to look out for his ship, and 'if they meet or encounter that ship, to detain Hugo and all the Dutchmen on board, to send them to Batavia, to be brought to justice there in accordance with the laws of the land.' Meanwhile, in the Republic, after much legal wrangling, both Hugo and Van Convent were acquitted by the States of Holland in 1664. While the distinction between privateering and piracy was formally clear, it was often challenging in practice.

Back as servant of the Company

In early 1671, Hugo proposed to the States-General to cultivate the island of Mauritius to make it suitable as a stopover point near the Cape of Good Hope. This move was intended to develop trade on the east coast of Africa, including slaves, ivory, and amber. Slaves were needed for the rapid construction of the new fort at the Cape, in anticipation of the impending war with England and France. Hugo made it a condition that he would not come under the jurisdiction of the Cape. The States-General agreed to this proposal, possibly out of fear that he would defect to the French with all his knowledge, as François Caron did, who was on his way to Asia with the Persian Squadron to conquer a base for the newly established French East India Company.

On May 14, Hugo was rehired as a merchant by the VOC, on the condition that he surrendered his letter of marque and did not venture further toward the East Indies. He was to focus on planting vineyards, tobacco, indigo, and other products and on combating the infamous rat plague, 'with bunzings, weasels, or other similar animals.' The States-General would provide more settlers and a garrison of 50 soldiers.

Chief of the outpost Mauritius

On December 15, Hugo departed with the ship "De Pijl" from the VOC Chamber of Amsterdam from Texel, accompanied by his wife and five children. The merchant Jan Nijhoff was added as an assistant and substitute. Hugo's eldest son, Gerrit, was hired as an assistant. In April 1672, "De Pijl" arrived at the Cape of Good Hope. Hugo's wife died during the journey. In May, "De Pijl" continued its voyage to the islands of Majottes (Mayotte), Mozambique, and Madagascar. During a visit to the coast, Nijhoff and three soldiers were taken inland by locals and did not return. In December, "De Pijl" returned to the Cape without having accomplished its goals, both in the slave trade and otherwise. In January, Hugo departed for Mauritius, where he found a desolate situation. The previous commander, George Frederik Wreden, had recently drowned in the surf while in a dinghy. The fortified lodge, named Fort Frederik Hendrik, was in a state of disrepair. The surroundings were no better. "The houses were in ruins, livestock had scattered, and the land was overgrown, in sum, the valuable island was in a terrible state and resembled a wilderness."[2] Hugo hoped to bring it back to order within a year so that it could provide provisions to passing ships. However, by May 1675, the situation had not improved, mainly due to a lack of people, which hindered the harvesting of ebony wood. Due to the war, no help had arrived from either the Cape or Batavia. On Mauritius, there were mainly free settlers who were not in the service of the company and people who could not be maintained at the Cape. Additionally, the climate did not cooperate. Hugo wrote to Batavia, stating that "the undertaking was poorly carried out due to the strong winds and rain."[2]

Meanwhile, complaints about his administration had arisen. Governor Godske of the Cape had complained that Hugo did not keep the accounts "in the Indian manner." Hugo retorted that where there is no trade, there is nothing to account for. In late 1675, the States-General instructed him not to adjudicate in cases of serious offenses but to refer them to Godske or Batavia. They were unpleasantly surprised that "the colonists complained so much about the harsh treatment they received and the suffering they endured."[1] His harshness was evident in the fact that, out of anger over his daughter Marie's relationship with the young corporal Pieter Colle, he had the latter imprisoned, whipped, and branded, eventually sentencing him to 5 years of forced labor based on fabricated charges.[1]

In May 1677, he wrote once again that cultivating the island would "require even more people, slaves, and necessities than had been allocated so far."[2] Since his five-year contract was coming to an end, he requested a transfer to another location. Batavia approved this request and appointed Isaac Johannes Lamotius, a draftsman and inventor who had developed a new type of sawmill for ebony wood, which was well-suited for use on Mauritius. Lamotius later reported that he had been received by Hugo "with all civility and politeness" and that he found everything on Mauritius to be "well arranged."[1]

Away from Mauritius

On December 15, Hugo arrived in Batavia with his family but was too ill to personally report to the Council of the Indies. On January 10, 1678, he was mentioned as one of the many distinguished guests at the installation of Rijcklof van Goens as governor-general. He must have died shortly thereafter.

== Sources ==
- Stapel, F.W. (1930). Hubert Hugo. Bijdragen tot de Taal-, Land- en Volkenkunde van Nederlandsch-Indië Deel 86, 3/4de Afl.
- Allister Macmillan, Mauritius illustrated: historical and descriptive, commercial and industrial facts, figures, and resources., London : W.H. & L. Collingridge, 1914
- François Leguat, The Voyage of François Leguat of Bresse to Rodriguez, Mauritius, Java, and the Cape of Good Hope, 2010, Cambridge University Press.

Preceded by George Frederik Wreeden	Governor of Mauritius; 1672–1677	Succeeded by Isaac Johannes Lamotius
