= Isaac Johannes Lamotius =

Dutch biologist and Governor of Mauritius

Isaac Johannes Lamotius (bapt. 29 May 1646 in Beverwijk – 1718) or (1653–1710) was governor of Mauritius from 1677 to 1692. Lamotius was interested in arts and knowledge and became an ichthyologist; he made 250 drawings of fishes which are kept in Paris.

== Family background ==
Isaac was the son of Johannes Lamotius, who played a main part in the capturing of Dutch Malacca (January 1641) and in Batavia married the widow of Matthijs Quast. As a sergeant major, Johannes was stationed in Dutch Formosa (September 1642–?). In 1653 Johannes Lamotius lived in Beverwijk, Netherlands.

== Career ==
Isaac arrived on the island in September 1677. In 1682 Joan Huydecoper II strongly urged the colonial administrators to undertake botanical research and stimulated the production of drawings of plants on the spot. He gave him instructions on how to start a herbarium. In 1685 Huydecoper requested subtropical plants. A cucumis arrived the year after in Amsterdam. Lamotius became an expert on the flora and fauna of Mauritius and published daily journals. In 1688 the last three dodos were captured.

Some say his fifteen years of command saw the island descend into despotism, and immorality was rife. When people complained in 1692, Lamotius and his second man were shipped to Batavia and tried in 1695, sentenced for private trade. He was banished for six years to the island of Rosengain, being chained on the most eastern of the Banda Islands.

| Preceded by Hubert Hugo | Governor of Mauritius; 1677–1692 | Succeeded by Roelof Deodati |
