= Guillaume Dufresne d'Arsel =

French sailor and administrator of the colony on present-day Mauritius

Guillaume Dufresne d'Arsel (born in 1668 in Saint-Malo, Province of Brittany, France) established French rule of Mauritius under the French East India Company in 1715.
