= Post-secondary qualifications in Mauritius =

Post-secondary qualifications are qualifications typically studied for after successful completion of secondary school. In Mauritius, this is usually after successful completion of the Higher School Certificate or its equivalent, although select qualifications may permit early school leaving or require additional study. A variety of different post-secondary qualifications are offered in Mauritius.

== Academic qualifications ==
=== Degree ===
The degree is the primary post-secondary academic qualification obtained, typically at a higher education institution. Academic degrees offered include the Bachelor's, Master's, and PhD. Entry requirements for the Bachelor's degree typically includes a Higher School Certificate with GCE A Levels in appropriate subjects. Entry requirements for higher degrees typically include lower degrees.

Qualifications may also be awarded in select programmes upon completion of a programme of study that covers part of a degree programme. A Diploma may be awarded after two years of undergraduate study; students may then progress onto a Top-up course, or be given advanced standing, to complete an undergraduate degree. A Postgraduate Certificate may be awarded after the first stage, and a Postgraduate Diploma may be awarded at the second stage, of postgraduate study; students may then be given advanced standing to complete a postgraduate degree.

University of Mauritius and University of Technology are the two main degree-granting institutions in Mauritius. Degrees may also be obtained from foreign institutions, either through study abroad, study at a local centre affiliated to a foreign institution, or distance learning; a number of education and training providers offer foreign academic qualifications to students in Mauritius.

=== License ===
A License is a three-year undergraduate degree, roughly equivalent to a Bachelor's degree. Types of License offered may include the License Professionelle (Professional Degree) and the License Technologie (Technical Degree). Select institutions of higher education, including the Université des Mascareignes, offer the License qualification.

== Professional qualifications ==
=== Nursing qualifications ===
==== Certificate in General Nursing ====
The Certificate in General Nursing is a post-graduate qualification that enables nursing practice. The course typically takes three years to complete. The pre-requisite for entry into the course is a Higher School Certificate or its equivalent.

==== Diploma in General Nursing ====
The Diploma in General Nursing & Midwifery is a post-graduate qualification that enables nursing practice. The course typically takes three years to be completed. The pre-requisite for entry into the course is a Higher School Certificate or its equivalent.

===== Top-Up Diploma in General Nursing =====
The Top-Up Diploma in General Nursing allows holders of the Certificate in General Nursing qualification to progress to the Diploma qualification with recognition of prior learning at the Certificate level. The course typically takes one year to complete.

=== Teaching qualifications ===
==== Teacher's Certificate ====
The Teacher's Certificate is a post-secondary qualification that enables teaching in primary schools. The course typically takes two years to complete. The pre-requisite for entry into the course is a Higher School Certificate or its equivalent.

==== Postgraduate Certificate in Education (PGCE) ====
The Postgraduate Certificate in Education (PGCE)is a post-graduate qualification that enables teaching in primary or secondary schools. The course typically takes one year to complete. The pre-requisite for entry into the course is a Bachelor's degree. Upon completion of the course, further academic progression may be available to a Postgraduate Diploma or a Master's degree in Education.

== Vocational qualifications ==
Vocational qualifications are designed to provide career and technical education in specific fields. They may be studied independently or may be earned as part of an Apprenticeship Scheme (AS).

=== Brevet de Technicien (BT) ===
The Brevet de Technicien (BT), also called the Brevet Technician, is a vocational post-secondary qualification, typically offered in a technical subject. Entry requirements for the Brevet de Technicien are typically a Senior Certificate or its equivalent. The course typically takes two years to complete. Subjects for which the Brevet de Technicien may be offered include Batiment (Building Construction), Electronique (Electronics), Electrotechnique (Electrotechnics), Frabication Mechanique (Maintenance and Production Mechanics), and Mecanique Automobile (Automobile Mechanics). The Brevet de Technicien is the Diploma qualification offered by the Lycée Polytechnique in Mauritius.

=== National Certificate (NC) ===
The National Certificate (NC) is a vocational post-secondary qualification, providing training and education in a particular trade. National Certificate courses are offered at several levels mapped to the National Qualifications Framework (NQF). Entry requirements may vary based on the course. Entry requirements for a National Certificate at Level 3 (NC 3) are generally a Form III Certificate or completion of Form IV in secondary school, the National Trade Certificate Foundation, or the equivalent. Entry requirements for a National Certificate at Level 4 (NC 4) or Level 5 (NC 5) are generally a School Certificate (SC), a GCE O Level, a National Certificate at Level 3 in related trades, or the equivalent. The course generally lasts for one to two years, depending on the level and field of study. Students may then progress onto a National Diploma, Diploma, or Higher National Diploma course.

=== National Diploma (ND) ===
The National Diploma (ND) is a vocational post-secondary qualification, providing training and education in a particular trade. National Certificate courses are offered at several levels mapped to the National Qualifications Framework (NQF). Entry requirements may vary based on the course. Entry requirements may include a School Certificate (SC) or GCE O Levels, a Higher School Certificate (HSC) or GCE A Levels, a National Trade Certificate at a specified level, a National Certificate at a specified level, or the equivalent. Work experience may also be considered or required.

=== Diploma ===
The Diploma is a post-secondary qualification. Entry requirements for the Diploma typically include a Higher School Certificate (HSC), two GCE A Levels, a National Certificate at Level 4 (NC 4) or Level 5 (NC 5) in related trades, or the equivalent. The course typically takes two years to complete. Successful completion of the Diploma allows for progression onto the Higher National Diploma.

=== Higher National Diploma (HND) ===
The Higher National Diploma (HND) is a post-secondary qualification. Entry requirements for the Higher National Diploma typically include a Higher School Certificate (HSC), two GCE A Levels, a National Certificate at Level 4 (NC 4) or Level 5 (NC 5) in related trades, a Diploma in a related subject, or the equivalent. The course typically takes two to three years to complete.

Higher National Diploma courses offered in Mauritius educational institutions are typically awarded by Edexcel BTEC with accreditation in the United Kingdom. A BTEC Higher National Diploma is roughly equivalent to two years of undergraduate degree-level study at a university. Upon successful completion, students may gain admission to Bachelor's degree programmes, typically with two years of advanced standing. This enables those who entered the vocational stream to re-enter the academic stream and progress further in higher education.
