= Droopnath Ramphul State College =

- Learn to live. Live to learn.

Location
- Souvenir; Pamplemousses; Calebasses, Zone 1 Mauritius; 20.113959°S 57.563052°E

Information
- Former name: Queen Elizabeth College-North
- School type: Public Academy
- Motto: To make thinkers out of learners
- Established: 1975; 51 years ago
- Sister school: Pamplemousses State Secondary School
- School district: Pamplemousses District
- Rector: Mantee Sookharee (2024)
- Gender: All
- Classes offered: Grade 10 to 13
- Schedule: 08:00-14:30
- Hours in school day: 6.5 hours
- Classrooms: 21 Classrooms
- Area: Around 25,900 m²
- Colours: Deep Sky Blue Guardsman Red Milk White
- Slogan: "Bouton Rouz Nou Fierté"
- Website: drsss.edu.govmu.org
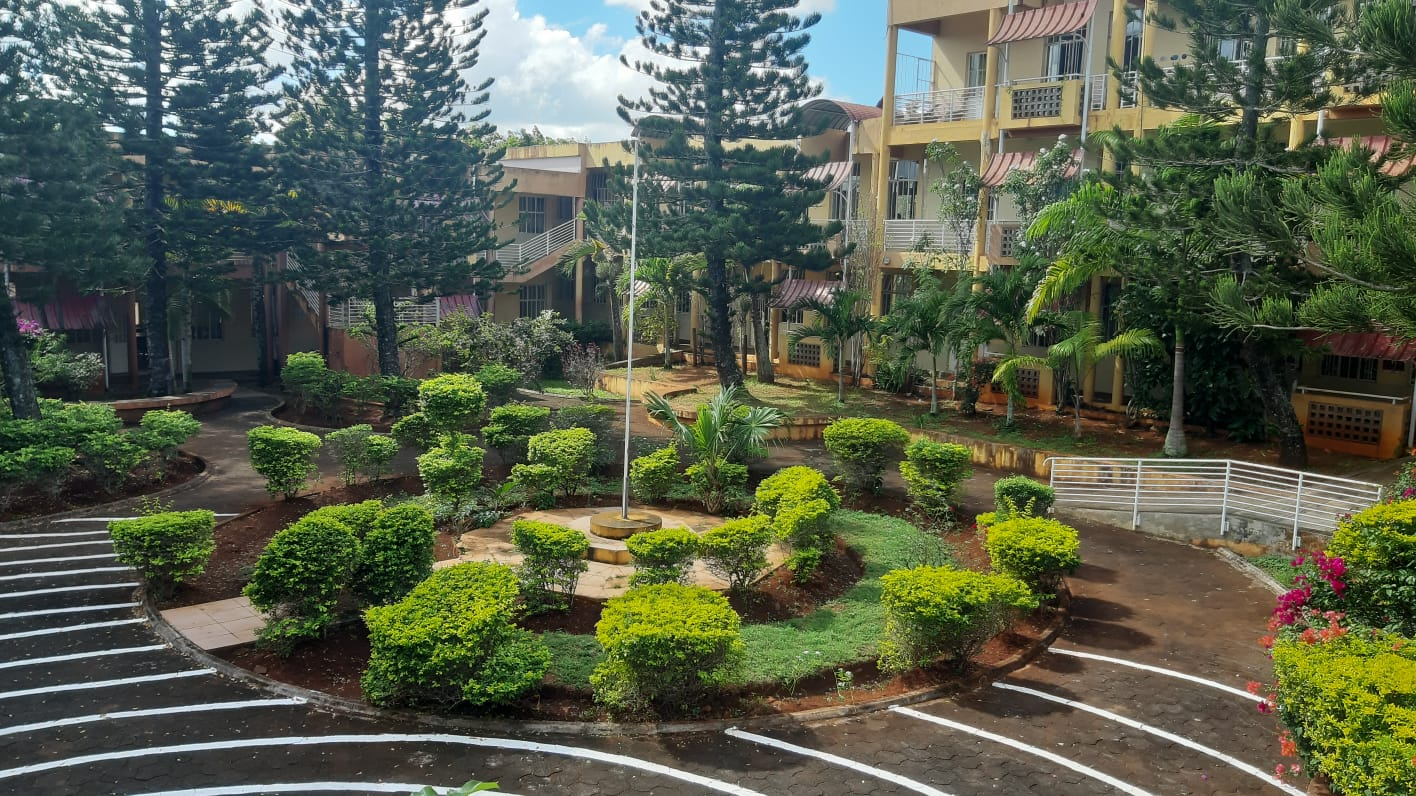
- Centre of DRSC (2023)

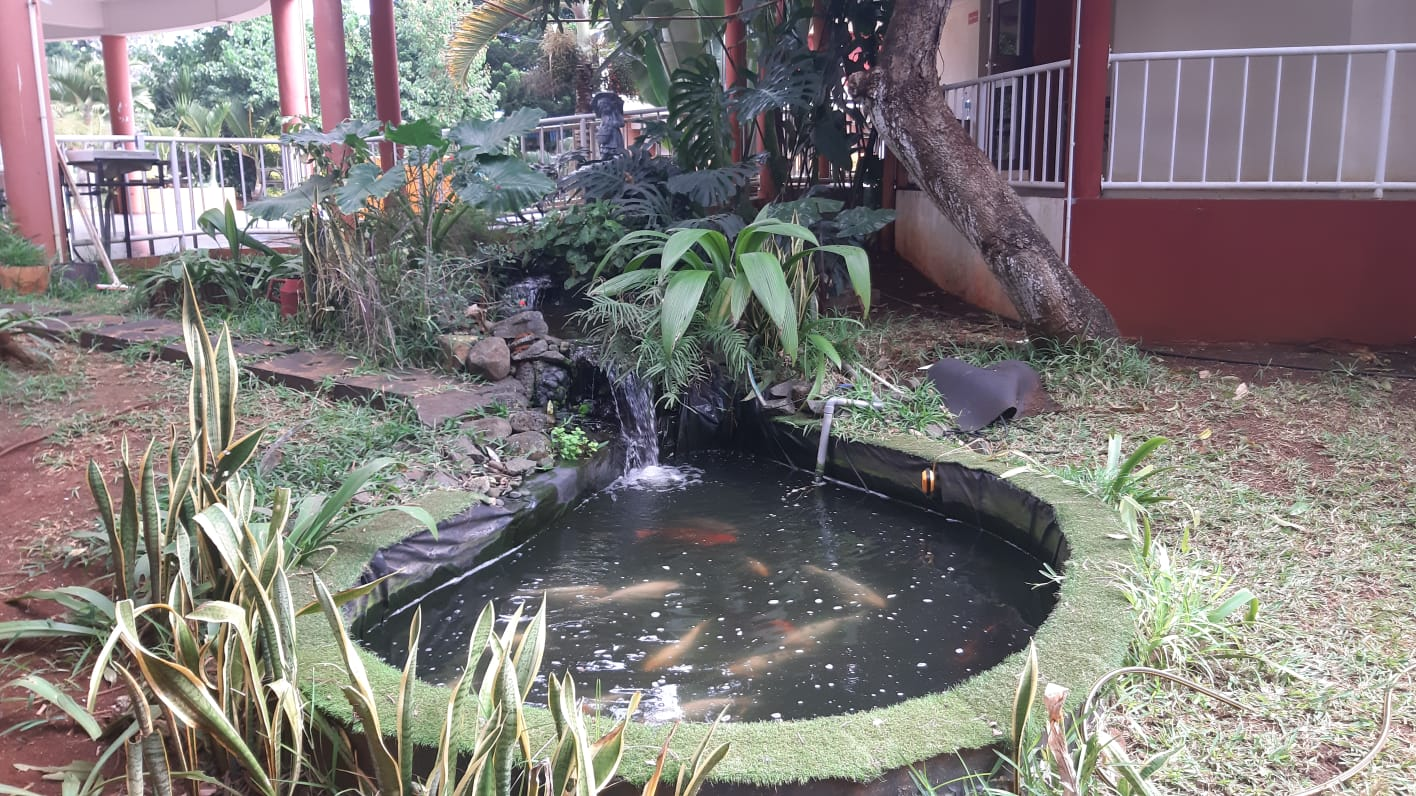
- Fountain of DRSC (2023)

Droopnath Ramphul State College (DRSC) is an academy based in Calebasses, Pamplemouses, Mauritius admitting both boys and girls who performed well in the National Certificate of Education (NCE). Students are prepared for the School Certificate (SC) and the Higher School Certificate (HSC). The school derives its name from an eminent Judge Droopnath Ramphul.

== History ==
This state college was built in 1975 . Under the rectorship of Arlette Bazire, the school began functioning in an old railway station near the Beau Plan roundabout.

In 1980, it was named after Judge Droopnath Ramphul (born 20 February 1921).

In June 1995, students transferred to a new location in Souvenir, Calebasses. The school was then renamed to Queen Elizabeth College - North (QEC-North).

Following protest against the use of the name QEC-North by Queen Elizabeth College girls, the school went to its original name till 2003 when it became a Form VI College and was thereafter named Droopnath Ramphul State College.

In 2005, DRSC has attained its first ever laureate for the HSC Examination done in 2004.

In June 2006, the school became a national college, and after three years, a fresh intake of Form I (Ex-Grade 7) students with four A+ (now known as 1) was enrolled. Students mostly come from Port Louis, the North, and the East.

In 2008, DRSC had a population of roughly 795 students, 535 of whom were from DRSC and 260 from Pamplemousses State Secondary School, who were accommodated at DRSC because their school was under construction.

In 2012, DRSC started their tradition of attaining at least one Laureate every year.

In February 2014, DRSC had attained its first Sir Seewoosagur Ramgoolam (SSR) National Scholarship for the HSC Examination done in 2013 on the girls' side (alongside Collège Du Saint Esprit on the boys' side).

In February 2019, DRSC had attained its first ever Laureate on the Technical side for the HSC Examination done in 2018. The former rector, Mr Nowkeswar Persand himself said that he was not expecting a laureate on the Technical side, but rather on the Science and Economics side on his interview.

In June 2021, DRSC was transformed into an academy, meaning the school will now be a mixed school and will only serves Grade 10 to 13. On 21 June 2021, the first batch of around 180 students, around ninety boys and around ninety girls officially started their studies at DRSC.

In February 2023, DRSC was the first school to have attained the Sir Anerood Jugnauth (SAJ) National Scholarship for the HSC Examination done in 2022 on the girls' side (alongside Royal College Curepipe on the boys' side). Following the scholarship, on 21 June 2023, the Prize Giving Ceremony was graced by the Honourable, Lady Sarojini Jugnauth.

== Unique Design ==
DRSC is distinguished for its distinctive architectural architecture among Mauritius' state colleges. The Administrative Block is on three levels and is placed in a circular building resembling a control tower, providing staff with a panoramic view of the entire school.

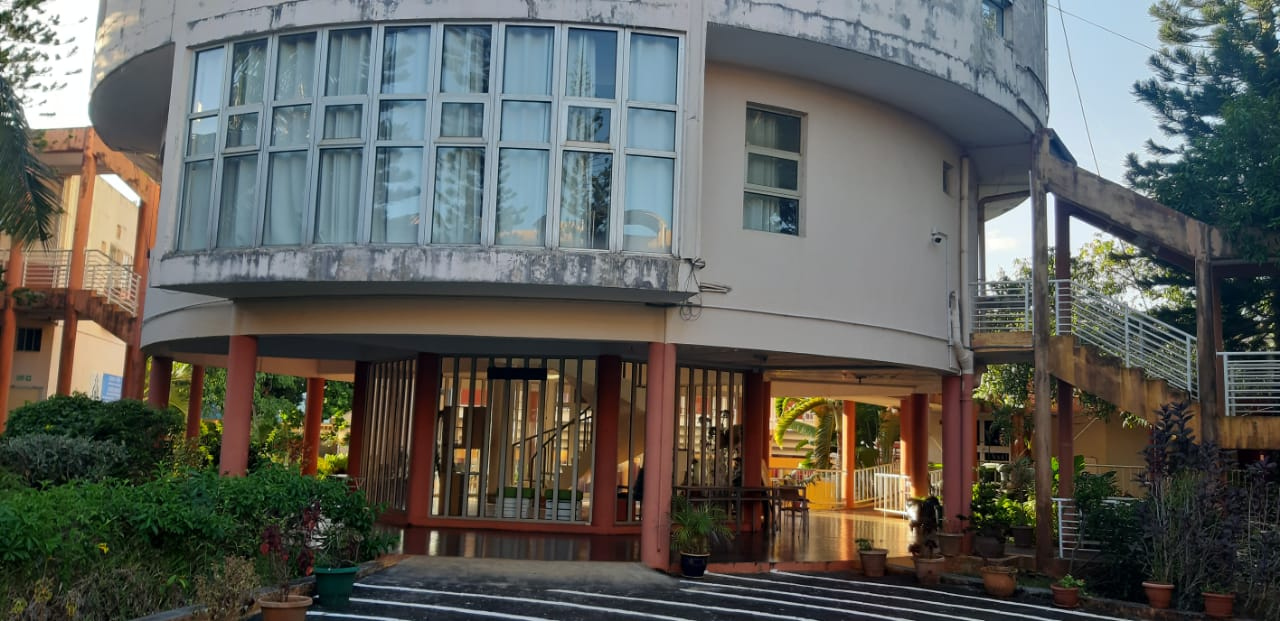
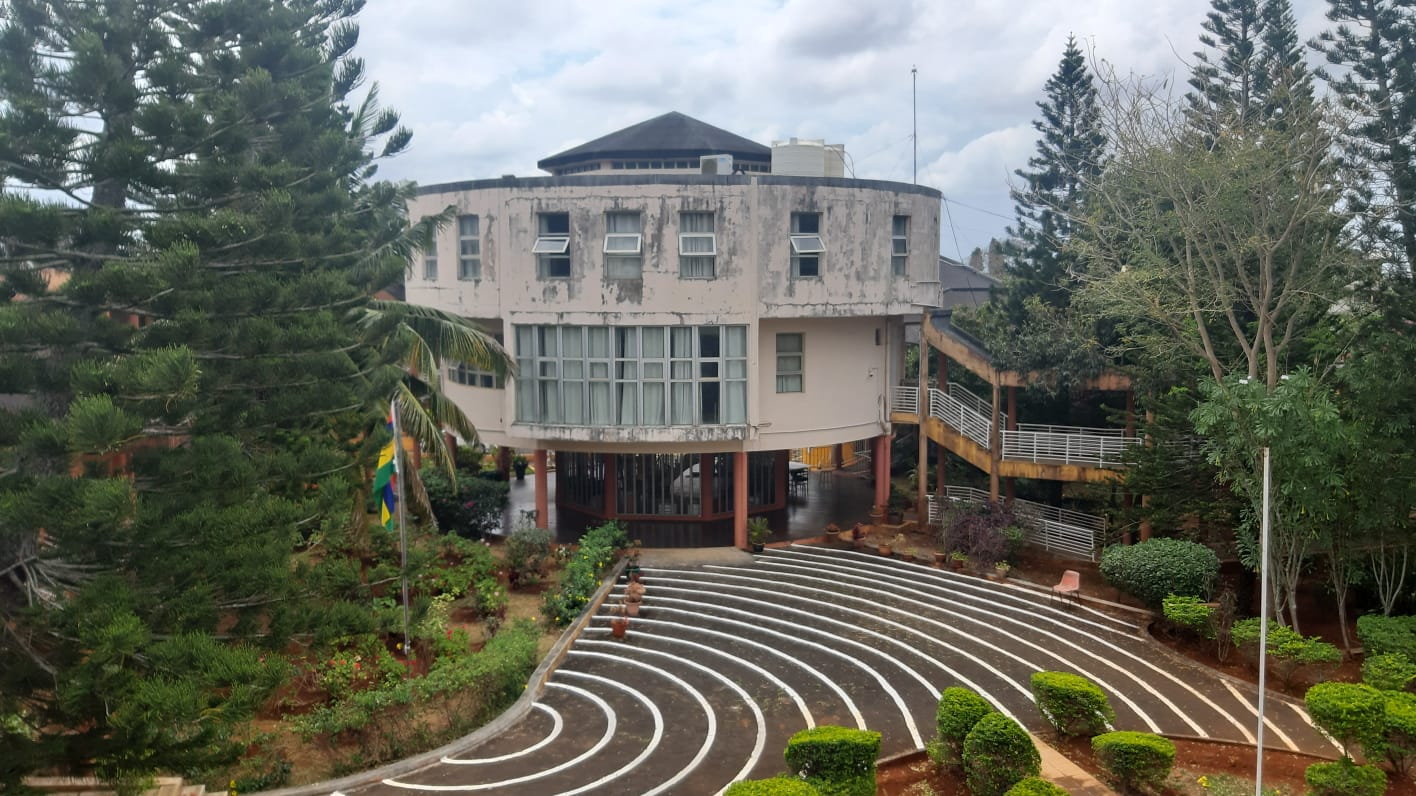

== Clubs ==
=== Arts & Crafts Club ===
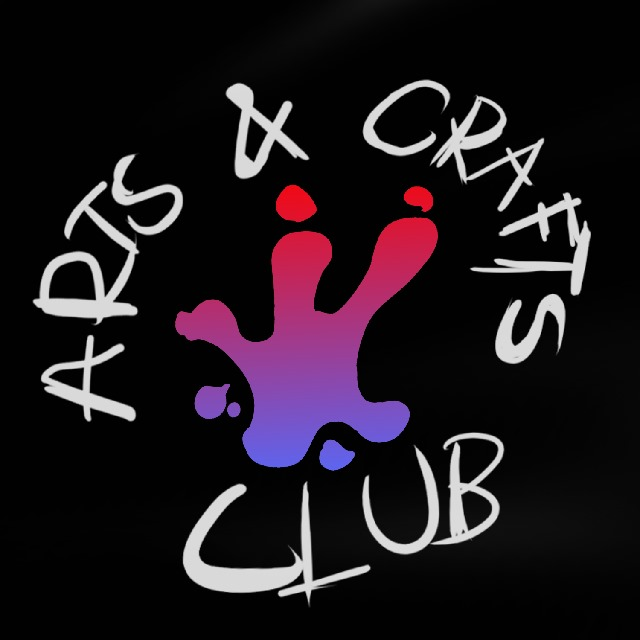

The club is an amalgamation of activities not only those concerning art. They tend to help for all school activities including sports day and music day and more.

"We believe that art gives us a chance to truly find ourselves according to our imagination and uniqueness. It allows students to connect with their creativity and through art, each of us is able to transform our thinking skills into incredible masterpieces."

One of the club's aims is to foster and develop an appreciation of art and the exploration of diverse aesthetics. Around April 2022, the club organised Thrift Shop Event where members collected old clothes and accessories from students of the school itself and converted the old attires and items into fashionable and voguish outfits. The activity not only encouraged the budding talent of students but the funds gathered was donated to a student in need.

==== Annual activities organised by the Club ====
- Decoration for National Independence Day
- Mascots and others for Sports Day
- Decoration for Prize Giving Ceremony & Music Day
- Mural Painting
- International Women's Day

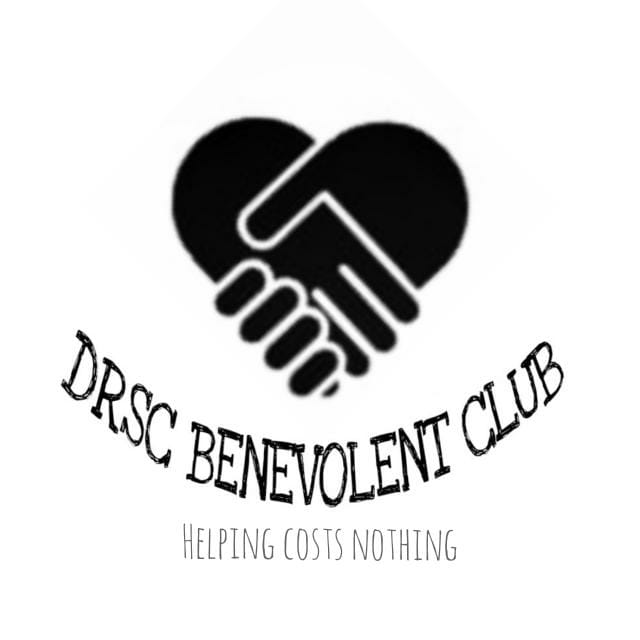

=== Benevolent Club ===
Each year, the benevolent club organises activities to raise funds, in order to help those in need.

=== Chess Club ===
Chess Club was revived by Geet Dussoye and Geshna Dussoye, along with the Club Coordinator, Miss Predita Gunput, a Biology Educator in May 2024.

On 30 May 2024, DRSC had their annual Fun & Food Day, and the chess club has hosted their first chess tournament where students and even teaching and non-teaching staffs could participate. The winner of that competition was Krivant Choytoo, student in Grade 12.

On 19 July 2024, the club hosted their second chess tournament (beginner-friendly version) of the year. On this tournament, only students could participate in it as it was done during a normal school day.

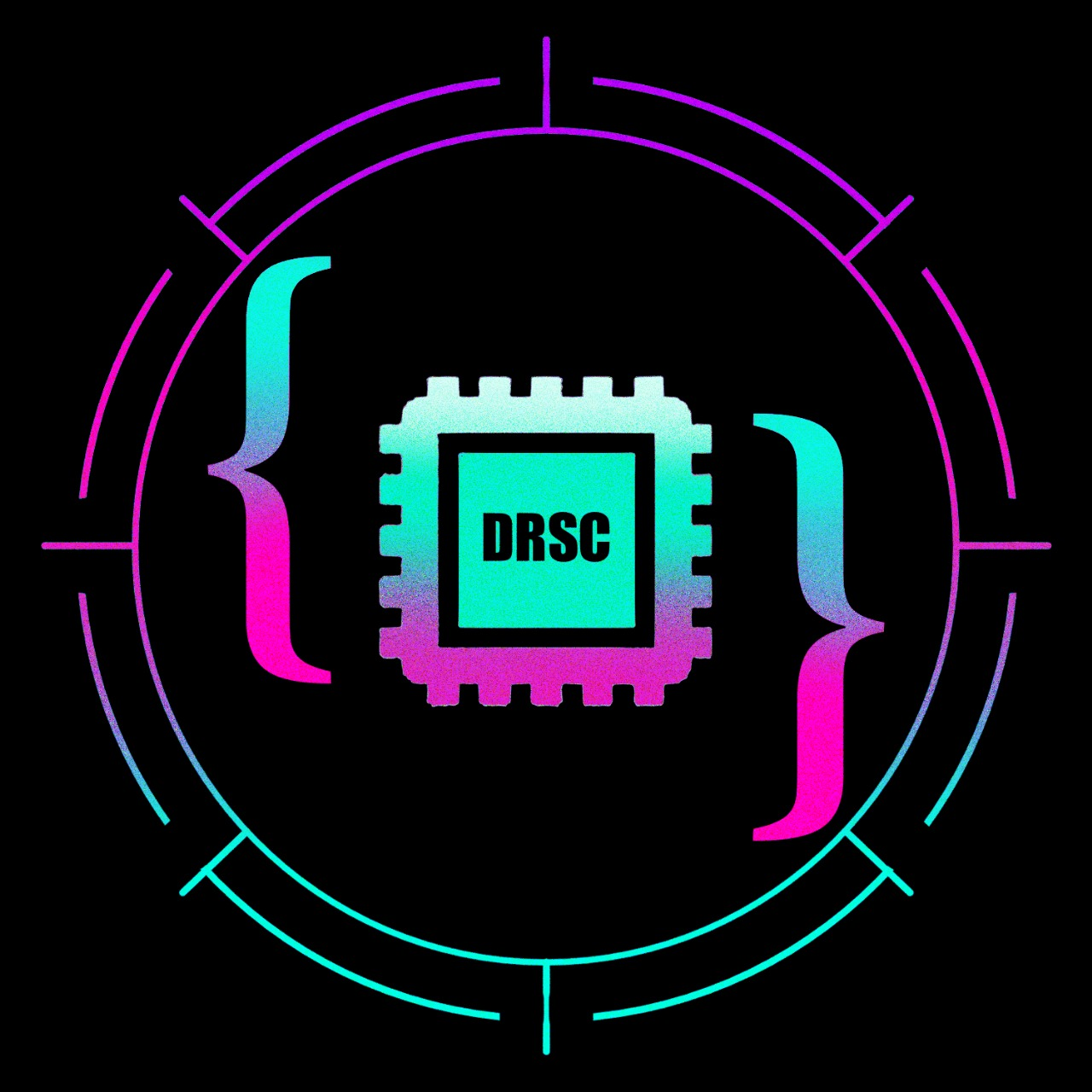

=== Computer Club ===
Computer Club (formlerly Code For DRSC) was set up by Nikhil Purlackee and Divya Taukoordoss, along with Computer Science Educators, Miss Bhavna Burrun, Mrs Koosladevi Dosieah, and Mrs Pooja Soorjonowa. This club is one of the few clubs that is supported by an external organisation, Code for Mauritius.

On 21 June 2024, DRSC had their annual Prize Giving Ceremony and the Code For DRSC executive members had coordinated the event to ensure its smooth running.

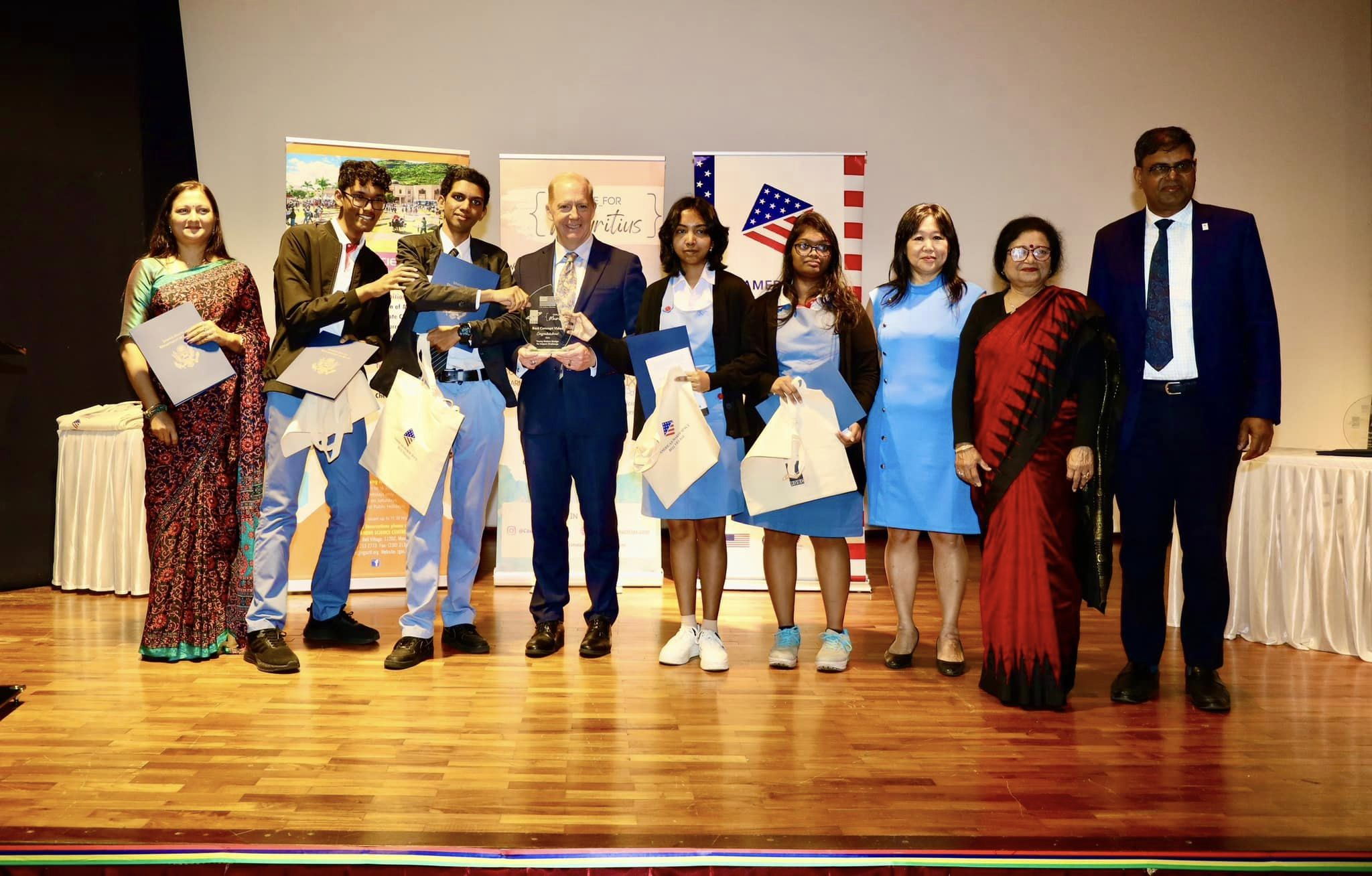
Code for DRSC with U.S. Ambassador

Code For DRSC has participated in the Young Makers Design Impact for Challenge organised by Code for Mauritius (also associated with them), Rajiv Gandhi Science Centre, US Embassy, and the American Makers Space and the team has won the "Best Concept Video" award. In addition, this is the first time Code For DRSC has participated in a competition, and it has already won a prize showing how strong the new club is. In addition, the representatives of the club was also interviewed by the Mauritius Broadcasting Corporation (MBC).

Around July to August 2024, members of the club have participated in the Webcup Junior 2024 organised by the Federation of Innovative & Numeric Activities in Mauritius (FINAM). Code For DRSC was also one of the partners for that competition. Multiple teams were assigned a topic, had to work on a website for a fixed amount of time and then present to the Judges. The team Trochetia, who are members of Code For DRSC had won third place on that Competition. In addition, this is the second time Code For DRSC was involved and a team representing the club has won a prize. Code For DRSC has won two prizes from two competitions in a single year, which is impressive when compared to other clubs at the school.

In December 2024, the club was assigned to make a presentation to give the new batch of students an overview on how the school works and what are the activities that were done throughout the school.

In February 2025, the executive team has presented the dangers of the internet on the topic of cyberbullying in front of the students, which was an initiative led by the Ministry of Information, Communication and Technology and Ministry of Education and Human Resource.

==== Annual activities organised by the Club ====
- Interactive Workshops
- Internal and External Competitions

=== Environment Club ===
The concept of ‘going green’ refers to the practice of environmentally friendly lifestyles which help preserve and sustain the environment.

In 2021, the club has organised the TiBazzar where staffs and students sold vegetables and plants at school to promote home gardens. Afterwards, the funds were used to make the Green your School Contest, where all classes were assigned a section of DRSC to clean, improve and even decorate it under a limited time and budget. The aim was to promote team building, especially the new Grade 10 students.

On 8 December 2023, DRSC has attained the Silver Award for the Eco School Programme awarded by the Vice President of the Republic.

"We aim for the green flag next year (that is 2024)…" -Miss Predita Gunput, Club Mentor for the year 2023

In 2024, the club has organised a competition namely, Upcyle Challenge: Transform Trash Into Treasure where individuals or groups of students has to make eye catching and innovative objects using items that we normally would not use. The aim of the competition is to contribute the Eco-School Programme and make DRSC an eco-friendly school. The winner of that competition was Aditi Boodhoo, a student in Grade 13.

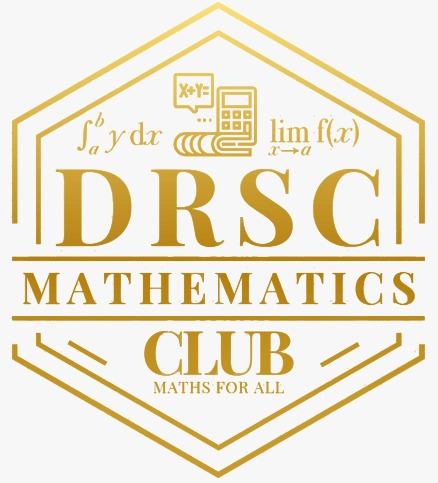

=== Mathematics Club ===
The Maths Club was set up by Nikhil Purlackee and Divya Taukoordoss, along with Mathematics Educators, Miss Harshita Kisto-Sadasing, Mr Subiraj Nundlall, and Miss Sushillah Soondur.

=== Music Club ===
In April 2022, the club has organised a talent show, to give students an opportunity to demonstrate their skills.

At the end of the second term of 2022, the club has organised a music competition open to all students in the school, to allow them to express themselves and relief the stress of the academic life. Each winner had received a shield during the music day.

Annual activities organised by the club:

- Musical Ceremony for National Independence Day
- Music Day

=== Science, Health & Wellness Club ===
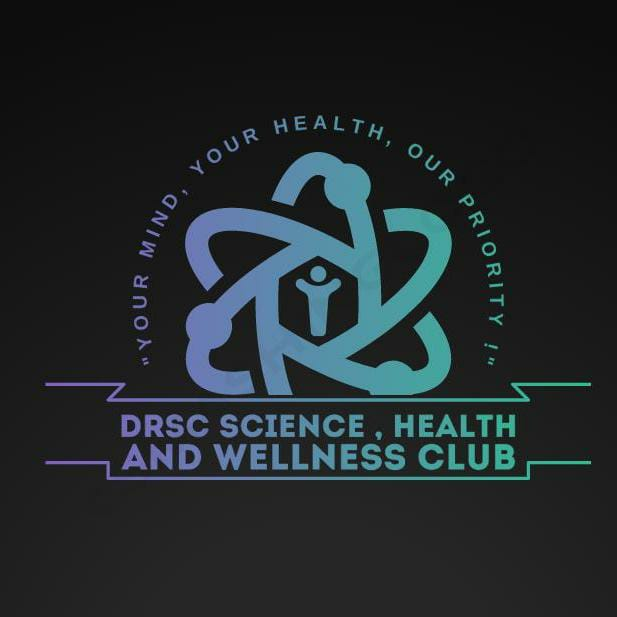

Around March 2021, the Grade 13 Orchid students and the Physics Department have participated in the Mauritius Research and Innovation Council's Building of Simplified Antenna for Satellite Data Reception and have successfully developed an antenna to receive signals at DRSC.

"We successfully detected a cyclone in Mozambique channel. From my Physics lab."

-Mrs Rauma Sewruttun Imrit, Club Mentor and Physics Educator for the year 2021

==== Annual activities organised by the Club ====
- Blood Donations
- Science Exhibition

=== Sports Club ===
==== Annual activities organised by the Club ====
- Inter-Class Competitions (Football, Badminton, Volleyball, etc.)
- Tafisa World Walking Day
- Sports Day

==== Duke's Club ====
The Duke Program at DRSC was set up in the year 2015 by educators Mrs Reekoye, a Hindi language educator and Mr Harish Mohun, a Physical Education educator.

During the school holidays of 2022, two batches of the Adventurous Journey (silver level) was conducted on April and August. A total of 178 students participated in the programme, including 76 boys for the first time. In November to December 2023, members of the club travelled to Rodrigues Island for 4 days and 3 nights to complete their Final Adventurous Journey (gold level). Many participants, after this say that this journey changed their perspectives on their life and claim that they take things for granted in their usual and learnt to appreciate small things they receive in life.

From 5 April to 9 April 2024, the members went to Pandit Dowlut Sharma Government School for their Gold Residential Project.

===== Annual activities organised by the Club =====
- The Duke of Edinburgh Award - Gold Level
- The Duke of Edinburgh Award - Silver Level

== See also ==
- Education in Mauritius
- List of secondary schools in Mauritius
