= List of tertiary institutions in Mauritius =

Location of Mauritius

This is a list of tertiary institutions in Mauritius.

== Universities ==
Institution	Abbreviation	Founded	Funding	Location(s)
Curtin University	CU	2018	Private	Telfair, Moka
Malaysian Consortium of Education Mauritius, Mauritius	MCEM	2018	Private	Quatre-Bornes
Middlesex University	MDX	2009	Private	Cascavelle, Flic en Flac
Open University of Mauritius	OU	2012	State	Réduit, Moka
Université des Mascareignes	UDM	2012	State	Rose Hill
University of Mauritius	UOM	1965	State	Réduit, Moka
University of Technology	UTM	2000	State	Pointe aux Sables

== Other institutions ==
Institution	Abbreviation	Type	Founded	Funding	Location(s)
African Leadership College	ALC	Tertiary	2014	Private	ALC New Campus, Powder Mill Road, Pamplemousses
Alliance Française de l'île Maurice	af				Bell Village
Amity Institute of Higher Education				Private	Unicity Flic en Flac
Anna Medical College and Research Centre				Private	Solitude
Apollo Bramwell Nursing School				Private	Port Louis
Appavoo Business School				Private	Port Louis
BSP School of Accountancy & Management				Private	Curepipe, Port Louis
Belstar Training Centre				Private	Rose Hill
C-DAC School of Advanced Computing			2002	Private	Quatre Bornes
Centre d'Études Supérieures de la MCCI				Private	Ebène
Centre for Legal and Business Studies				Private	Rose Hill
Charles Telfair Institute				Private	Moka
Ecole de Medecine Louis Pasteur				Private	Port Louis
Elite Business School				Private	Ebene
Fashion and Design Institute	FDI		2009	State	
Glamis Business School				Private	Quatre Bornes
Honoris Educational Network			2002	Private	Vacoas
Grant Thornton (Business School)			1999	Private	Ebène
ISITECH Business School				Private	Ebène
Institute of Marketing and Management				Private	Quatre Bornes
JSS Academy of Technical Education	JSS Academy			Private	Vacoas
Jhurry Rya School	JR School			Private	Port Louis
London College of Accountancy	LCA			Private	Ebène
Mahatma Gandhi Institute	MGI		1970	State	Moka
Mauras College of Dentistry and Hospital and Oral Institute				Private	Arsenal
Mauritius Institute of Education	MIE		1973	State	Réduit, Moka
Mauritius Institute of Health	MIH		1989	State	Pamplemousses
Mauritius Institute of Training and Development	MITD (former IVTB)		1988	State	Moka
Padmashree Dr. D.Y. Patil Medical College				Private	Quatre Bornes
Rabindranath Tagore Institute	RTI		December 2002	State	Pamplemousses
Rushmore Business School				Private	Quatre Bornes
Sir Seewoosagur Ramgoolam Medical College	SSRMC		1996	Private	Belle Rive
Sup'CG Management & Networks				Private	Ebène
SUPINFO International University	SUPINFO		2014	Private	Pierrefonds
The Datamatics Computer Centre			1985	Private	Rose Hill
Vatel Hotel & Tourism Management School				Private	Quatre Bornes
Vocational Training Institute			1975	Private	Vacoas
Whitefield Business School				Private	Quatre Bornes

== See also ==
- Tertiary education in Mauritius
- Education in Mauritius
- List of universities and colleges by country
