= Adolphe de Plevitz SSS =

ADP State Secondary School
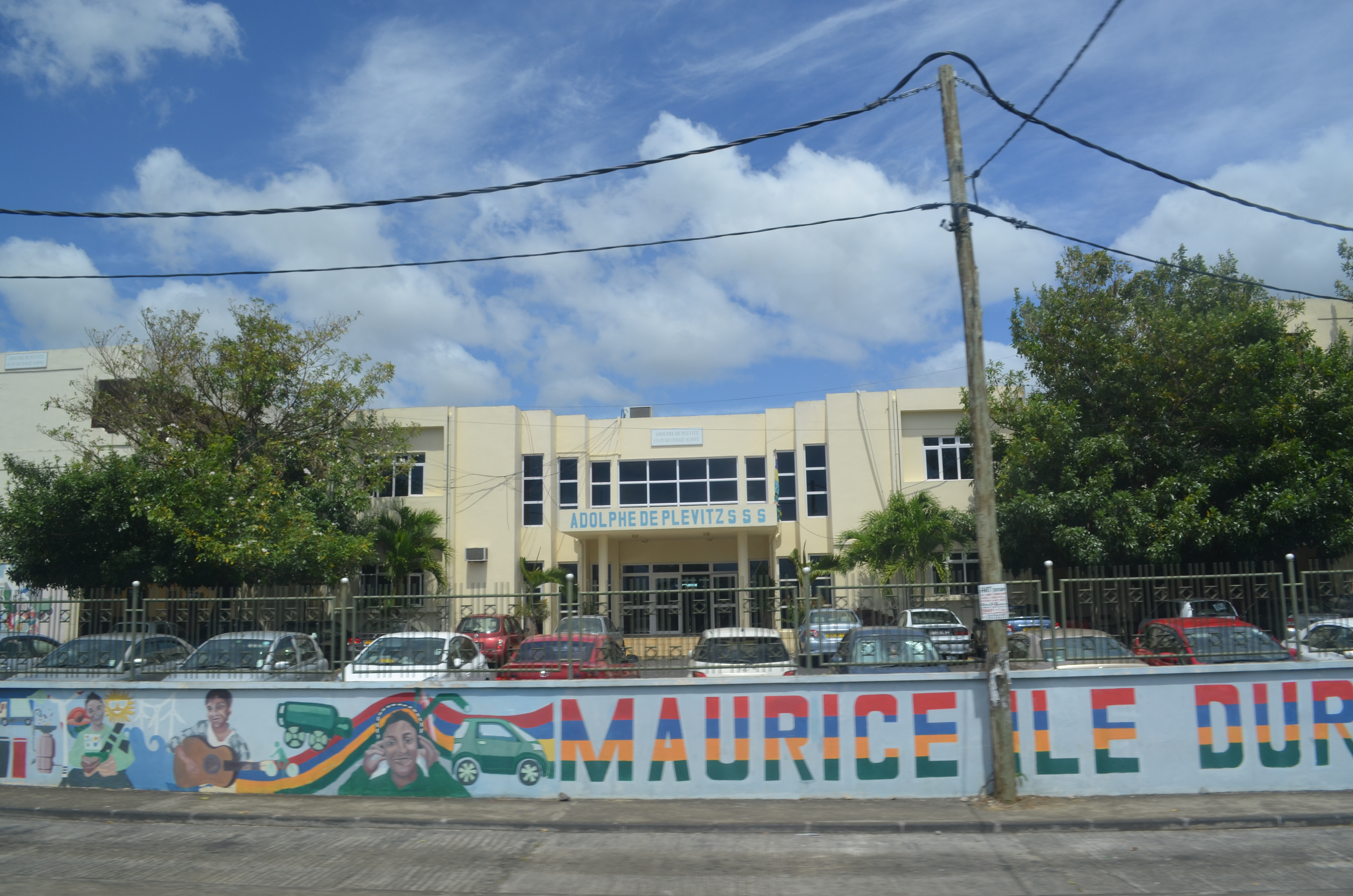

Location
- Sottise Road, Grand Baie; Grand-Baie, Mauritius; 20.020369°S 57.579787°E

Information
- School type: Secondary School
- Motto: World Class Education For All
- School district: Rivière du Rempart District
- Rector: Mrs B.Z. Bholah Mookith
- Gender: Boys
- Classes offered: Grade 7 - 13 (Form 1 - Upper 6)
- Classrooms: 32
- Colours: Dark Blue; White

Adolphe de Plevitz State Secondary School is a boys' state secondary school based in Grand-Baie, Mauritius. Students are prepared for the National Certificate Education (NCE), School Certificate (SC) and the Higher School Certificate (HSC).

== History ==
When it was first inaugurated in 2003 the school was originally named "Royal College, Grand Bay". However it was later renamed after the renowned French philanthropist and social worker Adolphe de Plevitz who fought for basic working rights of sugar-cane labourers in Mauritius in the 19th century.

== Infrastructure ==
The school is located at Sottise Road, Grand Bay, Mauritius and is opposite Grand Bay Clinic. The school building is square-shaped and has two storeys. It includes 32 Classrooms, Workshops for technical classes, Art rooms, Computer Science laboratories, laboratories for Chemistry, Physics and Biology. There is also a library, staff-room, gymnasium, lecture theatre and multimedia room.

== Laureate ==
Yogesh Koomar Jagessur became the first student of this secondary school to win a scholarship at the Higher School Certificate in the Science field in 2012.

== See also ==
- Education in Mauritius
- List of secondary schools in Mauritius
