= Piton State College =

Mauritian Governmental College

Piton State College (PSC)

Location
- Royal Road, La Paix; Piton; Mauritius
- Coordinates: 20.098215°S 57.633103°E

Information
- School type: Secondary School
- Motto: Scientia Salus Est (knowledge opens all the doors)
- Founded: 29 May 2002
- School district: Riviere Du Rempart District
- Authority: Ministry of education, Mauritius
- Category: Education
- Rector: Mr. S. Dhunookdharee
- Gender: Boys
- Average class size: 35 Students
- Classes offered: Form 1 Form 2 Form 3 Form 4 & 5 (SC); Lower 6 and Upper 6 (HSC)
- Schedule: 08:00-14:30
- Classrooms: 36 normal classes 11 science laboratories 2 IT laboratories 4 DT workshops />4 Food & textile classrooms
- Colours: White and Black
- Nickname: PSC

Piton State College (PSC) is a state secondary school based in Piton, Mauritius. Students are prepared for the School Certificate and the Higher School Certificate that are carried out through the Cambridge International Examinations(CIE). Piton State College is owned and controlled by the Government of Mauritius through the Ministry of Education of Mauritius.

== History ==
The Foundation Stone was laid on 29 May 2002 and the inauguration was done on 7 November 2003. The school was given the name Piton Form VI College (Boys) on 29 May 2002 and was renamed Piton State College on 7 November 2003. In January 2006, as a result of a policy decision of the Government, the school started admitting pupils from form I -VI. The school population is around 863 students, number of teaching staff is 53 and number of non-teaching staff is 17. Leckraj Sharma Hurbhookun became the first laureate in 2019.

== See also ==
- Education in Mauritius
- List of secondary schools in Mauritius
