= Mauritius Qualifications Authority =

The Mauritius Qualifications Authority (MQA) is the government organisation responsible for setting educational standards and accrediting qualifications.

Its head office is in Vacoas-Phoenix.

== National Qualifications Framework ==
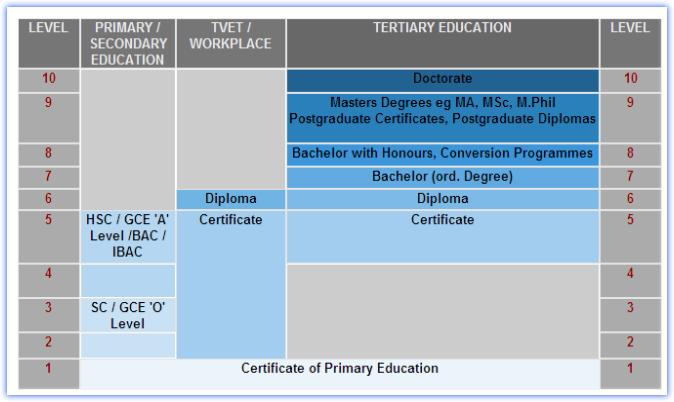
National Qualifications Framework

The National Qualifications Framework (NQF) in Mauritius is the framework for setting educational standards of academic and vocational qualifications as well as for categorising qualifications by level and stage of education. The NQF is established and maintained by the Mauritius Qualifications Authority. The framework may be mapped to qualification frameworks of other countries.

=== Levels ===
National Qualifications Framework (NQF)
NQF Level	Primary and Secondary Education	Technical & Vocational Education and Training (TVET)	Tertiary Education
Level 10			Doctorate degree
Level 9			Master's degree; Postgraduate certificate; Postgraduate diploma
Level 8			Bachelor honours degree; Conversion programmes
Level 7			Bachelor ordinary degree
Level 6		Diploma	Diploma
Level 5	Higher School Certificate (HSC); GCE A Level; Baccalaureat; IB Diploma	Certificate	Certificate
Level 4			
Level 3	School Certificate (SC); GCE O Level		
Level 2			
Level 1	Certificate of Primary Education		
