= Sangeet Fowdar =

The Honourable Sangeet Fowdar MP
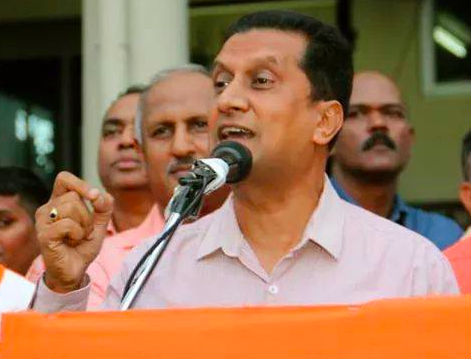

Ministry of Training, Skills, Development, Productivity and External Communications
- In office 18 September 2000 – 3 July 2005
- President: Cassam Uteem; Karl Offmann; Sir Anerood Jugnauth
- Prime Minister: Sir Anerood Jugnauth; Paul Berenger
- Preceded by: Paul Berenger
- Succeeded by: Navin Ramgoolam

Member of Parliament for Grand Baie & Poudre d'Or
- Incumbent
- Assumed office 11 December 2014
- President: Kailash Purryag; Ameenah Gurib
- Prime Minister: Sir Anerood Jugnauth
- Majority: 21,746 (55.95%)

Member of Parliament for Flacq & Bon Accueil
- In office 18 September 2000 – 3 July 2005
- President: Cassam Uteem; Karl Offmann; Sir Anerood Jugnauth
- Prime Minister: Sir Anerood Jugnauth; Paul Berenger
- Majority: 21,258 (57.12%)

Personal details
- Born: 5 September 1957 (age 68) Mauritius
- Party: Muvment Liberater (2014–2019); Mauritian Militant Movement (1996–2014)
- Occupation: Accountant

Sangeet Fowdar FCCA, MP (born 5 September 1957) is a Fellow Member of the Association of Chartered Certified Accountants (FCCA) and Mauritian politician, serving as a member of parliament for Grand Baie & Poudre d'Or, Mauritius. He is a member of the Public Accounts Committee and the parliamentary representative for Mauritius at the World Trade Organization. Fowdar previously served as the Ministry of Training, Skills, Development, Productivity and External Communications of Mauritius in the cabinet of Sir Anerood Jugnauth from 2000 to 2003 and Paul Berenger from 2003 to 2005. He was first elected as member of parliament for Flacq & Bon Accueil in 2000, the constituency of former Vice-Prime Minister Anil Bachoo, where he was a Cabinet Minister. Fowdar was educated at EW Fact in Holborn, London.

Fowdar is a member of Muvment Liberater after resigning from the Politburo of the MMM in October 2014 citing his disagreement with the PTR–MMM alliance. He was re-elected as an MP for Grand Baie & Poudre d'Or in the 2014 general elections. Sangeet is married and has two sons.

== Early life ==
Sangeet Fowdar, better known as Sangeet, was born on 5 September 1957 in Curepipe, Mauritius. He is an Indo-Mauritian.

He studied for the ACCA qualification at EW Fact in Holborn, London. After qualifying as an accountant, he returned to Mauritius where he worked in the finance department for the Mauritius Housing Company.

== Political life ==
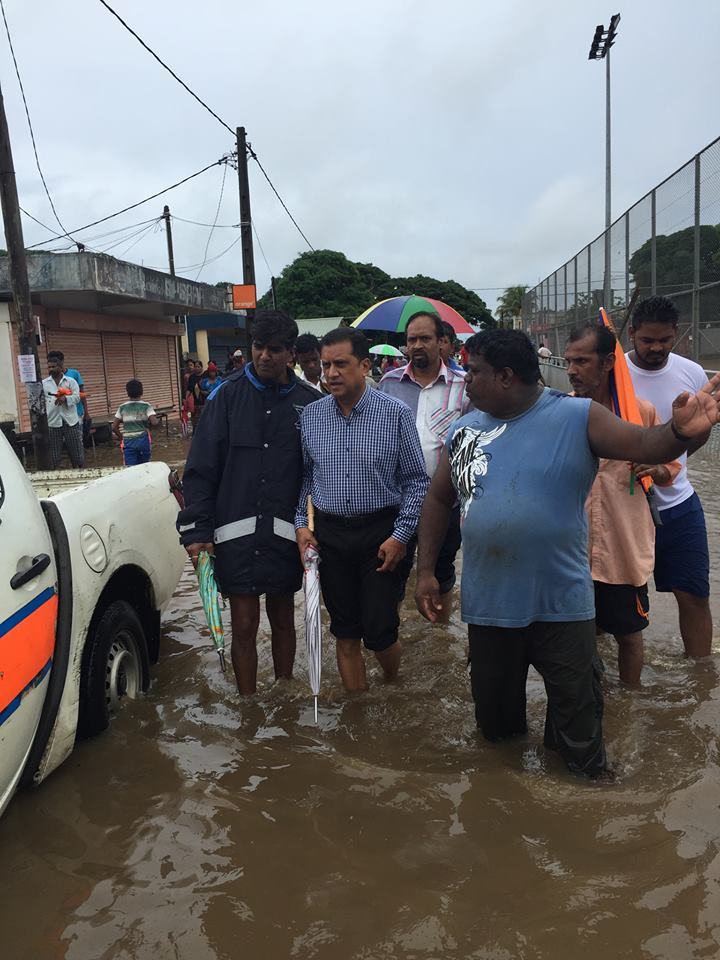
Fowdar in his constituency during the Mauritian floods of 2016

Fowdar joined the Mauritian Militant Movement in 1996 and was elected to serve as a member of parliament in 2000 in Constituency No 9, Flacq & Bon Accueil. He became a cabinet minister in the coalition government of the Militant Socialist Movement and the Mauritian Militant Movement in a power sharing deal.

In 2005, Fowdar was chosen to run again as a Mauritian Militant Movement candidate for Member of Parliament in Constituency No 9, Flacq & Bon Accueil but was not elected and came fourth behind the three elected members. He was chosen to run again in the 2010 general elections under the Mauritian Militant Movement for Constituency No 15, La Caverne and Phoenix and came fourth yet again, missing out by 5.8% in being elected.

== Minister of Training ==
Fowdar has been Minister of Training, where his ministry was responsible was the development of the Human Resource Development Council in Mauritius. An institution which was created to continually assess the country's needs for vocational training deal with the transformations of our economy. His ministry was also responsible in the creation of the Mauritius Qualifications Authority in 2002, which was to regulate the operation of organizations that specialize in vocational training (licensing operation, definition of norms and standards).

Whilst in Office, Fowdar also reorganised the Skill Development Program for young unemployed graduates in order to allow a greater number of diplomas and degree holders to acquire professional experience of at least one year. They received a monthly allowance of Rs 6,000 to Rs 8,000. Fowdar also offered basic computer courses free of charge to thousands of young holders of the HSC and provided E-commerce courses and Call Center Operations to holders of SC and HSC.

== 2014 General elections ==
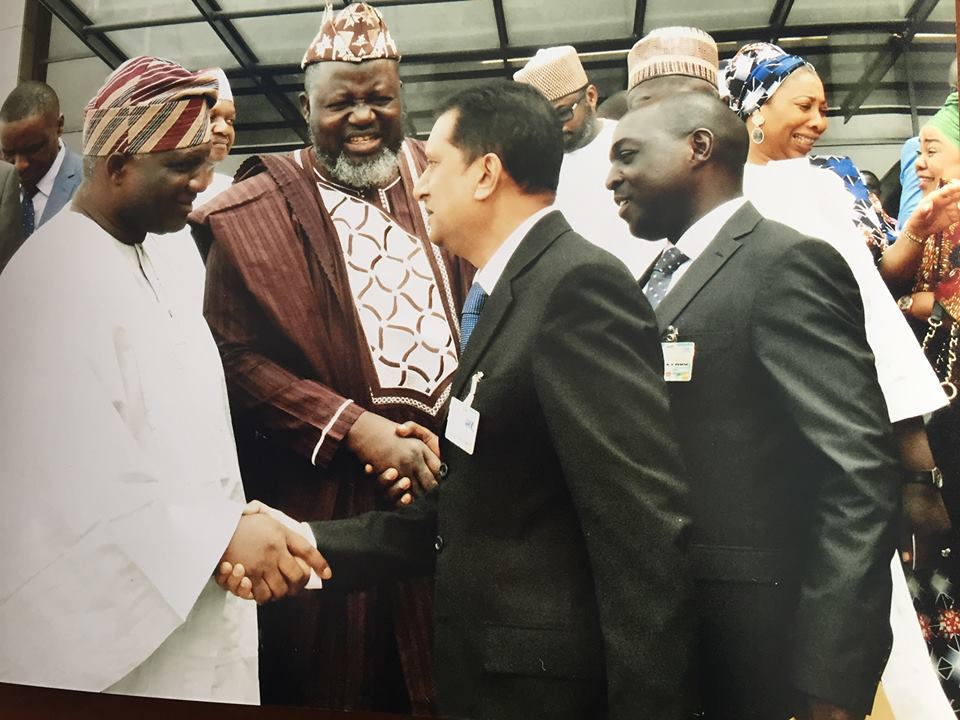
Fowdar at a CPA meeting in Nigeria

Fowdar resigned as a member of the Mauritian Militant Movement in October 2014 after being a member for 18 years and subsequently joined the Muvment Liberater. He stated having taken this decision "in the interest of the country" and that he is extremely dissatisfied with the Mauritian Militant Movement's decision to ally with the Mauritius Labour Party.

Fowdar stood as candidate in the 2014 general elections for the Muvment Liberater for Constituency No 6, Grand Baie & Poudre d'Or under "Alliance Lepep" and was subsequently elected as member of parliament. Following the victory of "Alliance Lepep" in the elections, Fowdar re-entered parliament and was appointed as a member of the Public Accounts Committee and became the parliamentary representative for Mauritius at the World Trade Organization.

He is known to be an extremely active politician, not afraid to voice out his views. In April 2016, Fowdar has been described by the current Deputy Prime-Minister Ivan Collendavelloo as an element of value.
