= Mauritius Institute of Training and Development =

Mauritius Institute of Mau
- Location: Mauritius
- Website: http://www.mitd.mu/

The Mauritius Institute of Training and Development is an institute of pre-vocational and vocational education in Mauritius. The institute offers technical and vocational education and training (TVET) courses at the secondary and tertiary levels of education, as well as training for professional certifications in a number of subjects.

The institute also offers education and training options for early school leavers. Previously the institute offered the National Trade Certificate Foundation (NTC F) course for early school leavers who failed to complete primary school and earn the Certificate of Primary Education. However, this course option has been gradually phased out and replaced with a programme of study of four years of pre-vocational education.

== See also ==
- Education in Mauritius
- Vocational education in Mauritius
