= Ramgoolam =

Ramgoolam is a surname. Notable people with the surname include:

- Navin Ramgoolam (born 1947), Prime Minister of Mauritius
- Seewoosagur Ramgoolam (1900–1985), former Prime Minister and former Governor General of Mauritius
- Sushil Ramgoolam, wife of Seewoosagur Ramgoolam

== See also ==
- Sir Seewoosagur Ramgoolam Botanical Garden
- Sir Seewoosagur Ramgoolam International Airport
- Sir Seewoosagur Ramgoolam Medical College
