= Pre-vocational Certificate =

The Pre-vocational Certificate is a vocational qualification in Mauritius designed for early school leavers who have failed to successfully complete the exams required for the Certificate of Primary Education, a pre-requisite for entry into secondary school, or who are at or above age 13. The qualification is offered by the Mauritius Institute of Training and Development. The pre-vocational programme includes Form I Vocational, Form II Vocational, Form III Vocational, and Form IV Vocational stages of education.

== History ==
Previously, students followed a pre-vocational course of education followed by the National Trade Certificate Foundation (NTC F) course led by the Mauritius Institute of Training and Development. However, this course option has been gradually phased out and replaced with a programme of study of four years of pre-vocational education followed by the NTC F course.

== Entry requirements ==
Entry into the Pre-vocational Certificate programme generally requires completion of Standard 6 of primary school. It is at this stage of education that students take the examinations for the Certificate of Primary Education; students who fail to take the exams or who are unsuccessful in completing or passing the exams may then progress onto the Pre-vocational Certificate and enter into the vocational stream of education.

== Curriculum ==
The pre-vocational programme of study includes instruction in the following subjects:

- Communication Skills
  - Arts
  - Kreol
  - English
  - French
- Numeracy and Problem Solving Skills
  - Mathematics
  - Science
  - Information and Communication Technology (ICT)
- Life Skills
  - Values and Citizenship Education
  - Health and Physical Education
- Livelihood and Trade Skills
  - Design and Technology
  - Home Economics
  - Entrepreneurship Skills

== Progression ==
Students who complete the course may then progress onto the National Trade Certificate (NTC) or enter directly into employment. Advanced NTC courses have as pre-requisites lower-level courses or their academic or vocational equivalents. Those who successfully complete the NTC can then progress further onto a Higher National Diploma course followed by a Bachelor's degree course, enabling re-entry into the academic stream.

== See also ==
- Vocational education in Mauritius
- National Trade Certificate
