= Brevet de Technicien =

The Brevet de Technicien is an educational qualification. The term may refer to:

- Brevet de Technicien Supérieur of France
- Brevet de Technicien of Mauritius
