= Anna Medical College =

- Montagne Blanche; Mauritius

Anna Medical College is a college in Mauritius. It is currently affiliated with University of Technology, Mauritius. It is located in Montagne Blanche, which is in the South-East of the Island and offers exclusively the MBBS program (Bachelor of Medicine, Bachelor of Surgery).

== Accreditations ==
Anna Medical College is listed with following agencies:

- Tertiary Education Commission, Mauritius
- World Federation for Medical Education & Foundation for Advancement of International Medical Education and Research
- Medical Council of India
