= Mauritius Examinations Syndicate =

The Mauritius Examinations Syndicate is the examinations board responsible for administering school exams in Mauritius, run by the Government of Mauritius. Primary school exams, leading to the award of the Primary School Achievement Certificate (PSAC) at the end of Grade 6 formerly known as the Certificate of Primary Education (CPE), as well as the National Certificate of Education (NCE) formerly known as the National Assessment at Form III, which is administered upon completion of the first three years of secondary school, are administered by the examinations board alone. Secondary school exams, leading up to the O-level exams taken for the School Certificate and the A-level exams taken for the Higher School Certificate, are administered by the Mauritius Examinations Syndicate in conjunction with the University of Cambridge Local Examinations Syndicate of the Cambridge International Examinations board.

== See also ==
- Education in Mauritius
- Form 3 National Exam
- Certificate of Primary Education
- School Certificate (Mauritius)
- Higher School Certificate (Mauritius)
