= Vocational education in Mauritius =

Technical and vocational education and training (TVET) in Mauritius provides technical and practical training for employment to students. Pre-vocational education in Mauritius provides preparation for technical and vocational education and training. Vocational education streams provide options for study and career development for school leavers as well as professionals.

== Pre-vocational training ==
The Government of Mauritius has established provisions for pre-vocational and vocational education, to ensure the continuation of education until students reach the age of maturity, at age 16, until which education is compulsory for all students. The pre-vocational sector caters to about 4,000 students who are ejected from the primary school cycle, due to failure in the Certificate of Primary Education or reaching the age of 13.

Previously students completed an unaccredited three-year pre-vocational training programme in preparation for entry into vocational programmes. However, this three-year programme was phased out, and eventually replaced with an accredited four-year pre-vocational programme of study, leading to the Pre-vocational Certificate.

== Vocational qualifications ==
=== Pre-vocational Certificate ===
The Pre-vocational Certificate demonstrates successful completion of a pre-vocational programme of study roughly equivalent to the Form III Certificate of the academic stream of formal education. The Pre-vocational Certificate confers ability to progress onto further vocational study or to directly enter into employment. Students may then progress onto the National Trade Certificate qualifications.

=== National Trade Certificate ===
Following successful completion of the Pre-vocational Certificate or the Certificate of Primary Education, students may progress onto the National Trade Certificate qualifications, which are vocational qualifications designed for teaching life skills and job skills as well as enhancing employability prospects. There are multiple levels of the qualification: National Trade Certificate Foundation, National Trade Certificate II, and National Trade Certificate III. Students may then progress onto post-secondary vocational qualifications.

=== Post-secondary qualifications ===
A range of post-secondary vocational qualifications are available. Entry into post-secondary vocational qualifications is available to those who successfully complete the School Certificate or Higher School Certificate through the academic stream, as well as to those who completed relevant pre-requisite vocational qualifications. Post-secondary vocational qualifications offered include the Brevet de Technicien, Nursing Diploma, Teacher's Certificate, Diploma, National Certificate, National Diploma, and Higher National Diploma. Those who successfully complete the Higher National Diploma may progress to the Bachelor's degree, typically with two years of advanced standing. This provides a pathway for students in the vocational stream to re-enter into the academic stream and then progress further into higher education.

== See also ==
- Education in Mauritius
- Vocational education
