= University of Technology, Mauritius =

Public research university in Port Louis

Coordinates: 20°10′36.4254″S 57°28′2.2434″E

University of Technology Mauritius
- Type: Public
- Established: 21 June 2000; 25 years ago
- Students: 4,500
- Location: La Tour Koenig, Pointe aux Sables, Port Louis, Port Louis, Mauritius
- Website: www.utm.ac.mu

The University of Technology, Mauritius (UTM) is a public research university in Mauritius. The main campus lies in La Tour Koenig, Pointe-aux-Sables, within the district of Port-Louis. It was founded following the government of Mauritius approval of the setting up of the University of Technology, Mauritius in January 2000 and the proclamation of The University of Technology, Mauritius Act on 21 June 2000.

UTM is a member of the Association of Commonwealth Universities and is listed in the Commonwealth Universities Handbook and in the International Handbook of Universities. UTM is a member of the Southern African Regional Universities Association (SARUA) – a network of public universities in the SADC region.

== Organisation ==
2008 Convocation Ceremony

The setting up of the university began with the merging of two public training institutions, the Mauritius Institute of Public Administration and Management and the State Information Training Centre into schools. The School of Business Informatics and Software Engineering, the School of Public Sector Policy and Management and the School of Sustainable Development Science became operational in September 2000. The university started a restructuring process in September 2008. The schools were respectively renamed as School of Innovative Technologies and Engineering, School of Business Management and Finance and School of Sustainable Development and Tourism.

In-company training is part of the curriculum in the tourism management programmes. It offers programmes on a part-time and distance basis as well as flexible entry and exit points. Many of the programmes are occupationally or vocationally directed, for example, banking and finance, tourism management and marketing, and software engineering.

It offers short course programmes such as a full-time course for higher executive officers for 15 weeks. In this orientation and approach it differs from traditional universities in the SADC. It is internationally recognised.

Courses are run within the main campus in La Tour Koenig and its satellite centres in La Tour Koenig, Bell Village and Moka. The building of a new campus near Moka, is underway to sustain its expansion.

UTM tuition fees are non-subsidised, as opposed to the University of Mauritius (UoM). A Tertiary Education Commission study revealed that the percentage of students satisfied with respect to course delivery was higher at the UTM as compared to the UoM.

== Schools ==
=== School of Innovative Technologies and Engineering ===
School of Innovative Technologies and Engineering

The three principal degree courses are the BSc (Hons) Computer Science with Network Security, BSc (Hons) Software Engineering, Telecommunication Engineering, Electrical Engineering, and BSc (Hons) Business Information Systems.

=== School of Business Management and Finance ===
School of Business Management and Finance

The School of Business Management and Finance delivers education, training, research and consultancy in areas of Public Policy and Management, Public Administration, Human Resource Management, Financial Management, Business Administration, Banking and International Finance and Communication. The school has 700 students enrolled on its full-time and part-time programmes which are delivered by 70 full-time and part-time academic staff.

=== School of Sustainable Development and Tourism ===
The School of Sustainable Development and Tourism caters for Tourism, Sustainable Development and Environmental Sciences. An MoU has also been signed with the Hotel School of Mauritius for UTM students to benefit from their facilities for practical sessions. In-company training, especially in hotels is part of the curriculum.

=== School of Health Sciences ===
The School of Health Sciences was formed when Anna Medical College entered into an agreement with UTM for the award of MB BS (Bachelor of Medicine and Bachelor of Surgery) programme in line with the curriculum based on that of the Medical Council of India and approved by the Academic Council of the university. The Bachelor of Medicine and Bachelor of Surgery programme is registered and accredited by Tertiary Education Commission, Mauritius.

== Research ==
The Research Degree Committee is responsible for research degrees. Staff are encouraged to pursue doctoral degrees. In 2008, there were 30 MPhil/PhD candidates on a full-time and part-time basis. The areas of research include management, tourism, applied mathematics, modelling and sustainable development.

== Affiliations and partnerships ==
UTM has established academic partnerships with companies like Microsoft, InterSystems, SAP, Oracle Corporation and Sun Microsystems. A Memorandum of Understanding (MoU) has been signed with the Mauritius Information and Technology Industry Association (MITIA) and the National Computer Board (NCB) for fostering a pool of qualified ICT professionals. The university has links with the Hotel School of Mauritius and Constance Academy to deliver tourism courses and the Mauritius Institute of Education (MIE) to offer Bachelor in Education degrees.

Since June 2009, the university has been affiliated with Dr D Y Patil Medical College to award postgraduate medical degrees in General medicine, Surgery, Pediatrics, Gynecology, Orthopedics, Radiology, Anesthesia, Psychiatry, Ophthalmology, Skin and VD.

== See also ==
- Education in Mauritius
- Tertiary education in Mauritius
