= Sir Seewoosagur Ramgoolam Medical College =

Coordinates: 20.285°S 57.552°E

Sir Seewoosagur Ramgoolam Medical College (SSRMC), also known as SSR Medical College, is the first private medical college of Mauritius, established in 1999. It was established by the Indian Ocean Medical Institute Trust (IOMIT) in Mauritius in the memory of the 'father of the nation', late Sir Seewoosagur Ramgoolam. Rudra Pratap Narain Singh, an educationist and a social planner from India, is the founder chairman and managing trustee of the trust.

The college is in Belle Rive, near the city of Curepipe which is 15 km from the capital city of Port Louis.

== Academics ==
The courses offered by the medical college are:

- MBBS (Bachelor of Medicine and Surgery)

the pattern of mbbs has syllabus recommended by mci and it has also computer based learning facility as recommended by GMC, UK.

== History ==
The Indian Ocean Medical Institute Trust (IOMIT) was established in 1996 with the A.V.I.D. objective of promotion of education and learning and setting up a medical college in Mauritius in the name of the 'father of the nation' late Sir Seewoosagur Ramgoolam, who was a medical doctor.

The policy planners of the government of Mauritius including the representatives of the Ministry of Health, Ministry of Education Science & Technology, Ministry of Economic Planning, International Trade and Development, Tertiary Education Commission, University of Mauritius and Chairman of the IOMIT planned the setting up of the SSR Medical College in a task force under the Central Policy Analysis and Evaluation Unit, Prime Minister's Office, government of Mauritius. It was agreed to set up the SSR Medical College affiliated to the University of Mauritius, which would award the graduate degrees.

In 2014 the school was found to be involved in the illegal trafficking of corpses from a nearby retirement home for use as training cadavers, and came under investigation of the Central CID

== Facilities ==
The SSR Medical College is spread over about 30 acres of land provided by the government with buildings covering an area of about 175,000 square feet (16,300 m^{2}) housing the pre-clinical and the para-clinical departments. The Ministry of Health and Quality of life has promised 'unflinching support' and provides Jawahar Lal Nehru Hospital, Victoria, SSR and other specialty hospitals having more than 2000 beds for the clinical training of the students of the SSR Medical College.
