= National Trade Certificate =

Mauritius vocational certification

The National Trade Certificate qualifications are technical and vocational education and training (TVET) programmes of study in Mauritius, designed for early school leavers to gain life skills and job skills for entry into employment.

== Pre-requisites ==
The entry requirements for the National Trade Certificate Foundation course are the Certificate of Primary Education, the Pre-vocational Certificate, or its equivalent, reflecting satisfactory completion of primary education in the academic or vocational stream. The Pre-vocational Certificate option is available for early school leavers who failed to successfully complete the exams required for the Certificate of Primary Education, or who are at or above age 23.

== Qualifications ==
=== National Trade Certificate Foundation ===
The National Trade Certificate Foundation (NTC F) course is a foundation level vocational programme of study designed for early school leavers who failed to complete primary school and earn the Certificate of Primary Education in Mauritius to continue their education and eventually join the vocational stream of education.

=== National Trade Certificate II ===
The National Trade Certificate II (NTC II) course is a vocational programme that follows completion of the National Trade Certificate III course.

== Progression ==
Successful completion of the National Trade Certificate II allows students to enter into a Higher National Diploma programme, a vocational qualification which covers the second year of Bachelor's degree, enabling re-entry into the academic stream. Students may also enter directly into employment after successful completion of the National Trade Certificate qualifications at any level.

== System ==
Mauritius's system is based on a German system and was adopted in 1996. As of 2010, the National Trade Certificate program was based around apprenticeship, with trainees spending four to five days work in their apprenticeship, plus one day of theory-based education. Employers are partially reimbursement by the government for their apprentices' wages.

== See also ==
- Education in Mauritius
- Vocational education in Mauritius
