= Cambridge O-Level =

International educational qualification

Cambridge O-Level logo used until 2013

Cambridge O-Level is one of many school qualifications offered by Cambridge International Education (CIE) for students typically aged 14–16. It is considered equivalent to the UK General Certificate of Secondary Education (GCSE) and the IGCSE (also offered by Cambridge), and acts as a foundation for CIE's higher-level school qualifications such as the Cambridge International AS & A Levels. The qualification is generally exam-based with little to no coursework options, and continues internationally as an adaptation of the GCE Ordinary Level, which was abolished in the United Kingdom in 1988.

== History ==
In the United Kingdom, it was introduced in place of the School Certificate in 1951 as part of an educational reform alongside the more in-depth and academically rigorous A-Level (Advanced Level) in England, Wales and Northern Ireland. Those three jurisdictions replaced O-Level gradually with General Certificate of Secondary Education (GCSE) completely by 1988 and the International General Certificate of Secondary Education (IGCSE) over time. The Scottish equivalent was termed as the O-grade (replaced by the Standard Grade).

The AO-Level (Alternative Ordinary Level) was formerly available in most subject areas. Sometimes incorrectly known as the Advanced Ordinary Level, the AO-Level syllabus and examination both assumed a higher degree of maturity on part of candidates and employed teaching methods more commonly associated with A-Level study. The AO-Level was discontinued, with final qualifications awarded in 1988.

The O-Level qualification is still awarded by CIE Cambridge International Examinations, the international counterpart of the British examination Board OCR (Oxford, Cambridge & Royal Society of Arts), in select locations, instead of or alongside the International General Certificate of Secondary Education qualifications. Both CIE and OCR have Cambridge Assessment as their parent organisation. The Cambridge O-Level has already been phased out and is no longer available in certain administrative regions.

There are some differences between O-Levels and IGCSE. The lowest achievable grade in O-Levels is E, whereas in IGCSE, G is the lowest. Compared with IGCSEs, fewer O-Level syllabuses have coursework components.

== Current usage ==
=== Pakistan ===
The GCE O-Level qualification is offered in Pakistan by CIE and conducted by the British Council. Pakistan stands out as one of very few countries where O level is preferred as the norm over IGCSE. To meet the "passing criteria" for O-Levels in Pakistan, students are required to take eight subjects, including English, Mathematics, Pakistan Studies, Islamyat and Urdu (as mandated subjects), with options for three additional subjects.

=== Bangladesh ===
In Bangladesh, the GCE O-Level qualifications are offered alongside International GCSE (IGCSE) qualification, which, despite the proper convention, is colloquially known as O Levels, with examinations conducted by Cambridge Assessment International Examinations (CAIE) and Pearson Edexcel, both under the board of the British Council. Both Pearson Edexcel and CAIE offer International GCSE qualifications with the O-Level qualification as an alternative for the national qualification (SSC) offered by the Government boards of education. However, due to the generally high costs associated with O-Level and IGCSE qualifications, their reach is limited to upper-middle and upper class families.

=== Brunei ===
In Brunei, the O-Level qualification is offered, with examinations conducted by Cambridge Assessment International Examinations (CAIE).

Several subjects: English Language, English Literature, Bahasa Melayu (Malay language), Malay Literature, Islamic Religious Knowledge, Ulum al-Quran, Hafaz al-Quran, Tafsir al-Quran (Asas), History, Geography, Pure sciences (Physics, Chemistry and Biology), Arabic, Art and Design offer exam papers and syllabuses unique to Brunei. Additionally, the Mathematics (Syllabus D) subject previously offered an exam paper and a syllabus unique to Brunei, but this has since been retired, and the regular syllabus used worldwide is offered. This is equivalent to secondary education now.

=== India ===
In India, Cambridge International Examinations (CIE) GCE Ordinary-Level qualifications are offered at private and international schools as an alternative to the conventional Indian School Certificate (ISC).

=== Malaysia ===
In Malaysia, the O-Level qualification is offered as the Sijil Pelajaran Malaysia (SPM, Malaysian Education Certificate), with examinations conducted by the Malaysian Examination Syndicate (Lembaga Peperiksaan Malaysia). The examinations were formerly conducted by the University of Cambridge Local Examinations Syndicate (UCLES), which still advises the national examination board on standards.

The English Language subject was previously offered with an exam paper and a syllabus unique to Malaysia, but this Malaysia-specific qualification has since expired, and the regular English Language exam paper and syllabus used worldwide is now used within the country. The English paper is separately graded by the national examination board and UCLES, and both grades are displayed on the result slip.

=== Mauritius ===
In Mauritius, the O-Level qualification is awarded as part of the School Certificate, which is awarded upon successful completion of Form V in secondary school. The O-Level examinations are jointly conducted by the Mauritius Examinations Syndicate and the University of Cambridge Local Examinations Syndicate (UCLES). The International General Certificate of Secondary Education from Edexcel is also offered as an equivalent alternative qualification, for which exam registration may be done through the Mauritius Examinations Syndicate.

A number of subjects, including English Language, English Language (Syllabus B), History, Mathematics (Syllabus A), and Mathematics (Syllabus D), offer exam papers and syllabuses unique to Mauritius. Additionally, the subject of Art and Design, the offering of which is restricted to a limited geographic region, is available in Mauritius.

=== Seychelles ===
In Seychelles, the O-Level qualification is offered, with examinations conducted by Cambridge International Examinations (CIE). Some subjects are unique to Seychelles or have a format, curriculum, or syllabus that is unique to Seychelles.

=== Singapore ===
In Singapore, the O-Level qualification is offered jointly by Cambridge International Examinations (CIE) and the Singapore Ministry of Education. The examinations are mainly conducted by CIE, with select subject examinations conducted by the Singapore Ministry of Education, including select mother tongue subjects, such as Chinese, Malay, and Tamil, and the humanities subject of Social Studies.

Despite the engagement of an identical examination board as partnering authority, the Singapore-Cambridge GCE Ordinary Level examination has no relation to the British GCSE examinations, having de-linked since 2006 when the Ministry of Education (MOE) took over the management of its national examination. This is owing to the stark differences in the development of the respective education systems in the two countries. As such, the exam papers and syllabi for the subjects are unique to Singapore.

After taking O-levels, some Singapore students go on to GCE Advanced Level exams, which are also marked by Cambridge International Examinations. In 2027, the O-Levels as well as the N levels will be phased out for a new local examination known as the Singapore-Cambridge Secondary Education Certificate (SEC).

=== Sri Lanka ===
The GCE Ordinary-Level qualification is currently administered by the British Council of Sri Lanka Schools (BCS). In the past, this qualification was jointly offered by Cambridge International Examinations and the Ministry of Education in Sri Lanka. The examinations in Sri Lanka are taken very seriously, and the exam is considered a starting point to a student's higher education. This is why, in recent years, Sri Lanka has produced high-scoring batches holding this qualification.

=== Zimbabwe ===
The GCE Ordinary-Level qualification is offered by the Zimbabwe School Examinations Council (ZIMSEC). Before, this qualification was jointly offered by Cambridge International Examinations and the Ministry of Education in Zimbabwe.

== Former usage ==
=== Caribbean ===
The O-Level qualification was previously awarded in the Caribbean. However, many Caribbean countries have now switched to awarding Caribbean Secondary Education Certification (CSEC) qualifications based on successful completion of examinations administered by the Caribbean Examinations Council (CXC).

=== Hong Kong ===
The O-Level qualification was previously awarded in Hong Kong, along with the Hong Kong version of the A-Level qualification. However, the Hong Kong Certificate of Education Examination (HKCEE) was established, but it was eventually replaced by the Hong Kong Diploma of Secondary Education (HKDSE). The HKCEE was previously benchmarked against the O-Levels for comparable subjects; since its introduction, the International General Certificate of Secondary Education (IGCSE) has been the benchmark for the equivalent local qualification (again, where comparable).

=== United Kingdom ===
The GCE O-Level qualification originated in the United Kingdom, where it was awarded as the secondary school-leaving qualification. It was primarily an examination-based qualification, with a grading system that changed over the years. In the United Kingdom, O-Level qualifications were replaced in 1988 with the General Certificate of Secondary Education (GCSE) and the International General Certificate of Secondary Education (IGCSE).

== See also ==
- List of Cambridge O-Level subjects
- Derivatives of the Cambridge O-Level
  - Ordinary Level (Sri Lanka)
  - Cambridge International Ordinary Level (Singapore)
- General Certificate of Education Ordinary Level (United Kingdom)
- Certificate of Secondary Education (CSE) (United Kingdom)
- General Certificate of Secondary Education (GCSE), which replaced the GCE Ordinary Level and CSE
  - International General Certificate of Secondary Education (IGCSE), which is offered with or instead of Cambridge O-Level internationally
- The General Certificate of Education system (GCE), which consists of GCSE and A-Levels
- School certificate (SC), predecessor to the GCE Ordinary Level and CSE qualifications
  - School Certificate (United Kingdom)
  - School Certificate (New South Wales)
  - School Certificate (New Zealand)
