= National Certificate of Education =

Lower secondary educational qualification in Mauritius

The National Certificate of Education (NCE) is a national assessment conducted by the Mauritius Examination Syndicate (MES) based on the "Nine Year Continuous Basic Education". This examination is taken by Grade 9 students in Mauritius.

The first examination started around May 2021.

== Progression ==
Grade 9 marks the end of compulsory education, and students are not obligated to continue their studies beyond this point. Grade 9 also marked the completion of lower secondary education. Students who successfully earned the NCE Certificate may then progress onto higher secondary education.They may have then studied for the O-level examinations and earn the School Certificate. Students who were unsuccessful in obtaining the qualification may have then transitioned from the academic stream to the vocational stream and progress onto vocational programs of study.

== Subjects ==
Code	Subject	Type of Subject
N500	English	Compulsory Core
N510	Mathematics	Compulsory Core
N520	French	Compulsory Core
N530	Science	Other Core
N540	Information and Communication Technology	Other Core
N550	Technology Studies	Other Core
N560	Business and Entrepreneurship Education	Other Core
N570	Social and Modern Studies	Other Core
N580	Art and Design	Other Core
N600	Hindi	Optional Core
N610	Urdu	Optional Core
N620	Tamil	Optional Core
N630	Telegu	Optional Core
N640	Marathi	Optional Core
N650	Modern Chinese	Optional Core
N660	Arabic	Optional Core
N670	Kreol Morisien	Optional Core
N700	Performing Arts	Non-Core
N710	Physical Education	Non-Core
N720	Life Skills and Values	Non-Core

== Former Form III Certificate ==
The Form III Certificate was an academic qualification in Mauritius awarded upon successful completion of lower secondary school. The exam last took place at the end of 2019 and was replaced by the National Certificate of Education (NCE) in 2020. The qualification was awarded upon earning passing marks on the National Assessment at Form III exams, taken by Grade 9 at secondary school, which are administered by the Mauritius Examinations Syndicate.

== See also ==
- Education in Mauritius
- Certificate of Primary Education
- School Certificate (Mauritius)
- Higher School Certificate (Mauritius)
