= Higher education in Mauritius =

Higher education in Mauritius includes colleges, universities and other technical institutions. Public university education has been free to students since 2019. The sector is managed by the Higher Education Commission (HEC) which has the responsibility for allocating public funds, and fostering, planning and coordinating the development of post-secondary education and training. Formerly the Tertiary Education Commission, in 2020 it was reformed into the HEC and a separate Quality Assurance Authority (QAA) for auditing of qualifications.

== Universities ==
=== The University of Mauritius ===
Starting as the College of Agriculture, the University of Mauritius, established in 1965, dominates the Tertiary Education Sector locally. Originally, it had three Schools, namely Agriculture, Administration and Industrial Technology. It has since expanded to comprise five faculties, namely Agriculture, Engineering, Law and Management, Science, and Social Studies & Humanities.

It has a Centre for Medical Research and Studies and hosts the SSR Medical College (Sir Seewoosagur Ramgoolam Medical College). It has a Centre for Distance Education, a Centre for Information Technology and Systems, and a Consultancy Centre.

The UoM is expanding, with a student growth rate of about 10% annually. Programmes have changed steadily from sub-degree certificate/diploma levels to undergraduate and taught masters Programmes, as well as research at postgraduate level.

=== University of Technology, Mauritius ===
The University of Technology, Mauritius (UTM) Act was promulgated in May 2000 and became operational in September 2000. UTM has three schools: the School of Business Informatics and Software Engineering, the School of Public Sector Policy and Management, and the School of Sustainable Development Science.

=== Open University of Mauritius ===
The Open University of Mauritius (OU) was established on 12 July 2012 according to the Open University of Mauritius ACT 2010. OU delivers education to learners who wish to study full-time as well as to those who are unable to be physically present on campus. With flexible study options, its learners can study from home, work, or anywhere in the world. The Mauritius College of the Air, which was established in 1971, was integrated with the Open University of Mauritius in July 2012. OU is a member of the Association of Commonwealth Universities, International Council for Open and Distance Education, and African Council for Distance Education.

In collaboration with other universities it offers courses in both open, distance, blended and full-time learning modes. There are three campuses in Mauritius and one in Rodrigues.

Distance learners watch or listen to materials supplied, work on course activities and assignments with support from the tutor who is an email away. Tutorials are organized but they are mostly optional and give a chance to meet the tutors and fellow learners. Through its virtual classrooms, international learners also participate in interactive sessions conducted by its resource persons. It also offers short courses that help to improve the employability skills.

OU offers qualifications ranging from short employability courses, B.Sc./B.Ed., M.Sc./M.Ed./M.A, MBA to DBA/Ph.D. to fields including Management, Business Administration, Human Resource Management/Development, Education, Finance, Accounting, Taxation, Law, Graphics Design, Journalism, Multimedia, Audio-visual Production, Translation Studies, Mathematics, Logistics, Transport, French and English.

OU conducts corporate training for private and public institutions. Employees are empowered through continuous professional development courses.

OU has a School of Public Health; a Centre for Research on Interculturality; and a Big Data Research Centre. http://www.open.ac.mu

=== Université des Mascareignes ===
The Université des Mascareignes was founded as the country's fourth public university in 2012, merging the IST (Institut Supérieur de Technologie) of Camp Levieux and Swami Dayanand Institute of Management (SDIM).

=== Foreign universities ===
==== Greenwich University Pakistan, Mauritius Branch Campus ====
The Mauritius Branch Campus of Greenwich University (Pakistan) is located in at 51, Ebene, Cybercity, Mauritius and fully accredited by the Higher Education Commission of Mauritius, offering undergraduate and graduate degrees in Business Administration. The Campus is also approved by Mauritius Qualification Authority (MQA).

Greenwich University has been imparting higher education in Pakistan for the past 30 years. The University is recognized by the Higher Education Commission (HEC) of Pakistan and is ranked among the top ten business schools of Pakistan. Greenwich University has a campus in The Republic of Mauritius, duly recognized by the HEC of Mauritius and the MQA, making it the only university from Pakistan who has an international campus duly recognized by accrediting bodies. It is member of Association of International Education (NAFSA), International Association of Universities (IAU), The Association of Advance Collegiate Schools in Business (AACSB), Asia Pacific Quality Network (APQN), International Network for Quality Assurance Agencies in Higher Education (INQAAHE), Association of Commonwealth Universities (ACU) and Association of MBA (AMBA).

==== Aberystwyth University Mauritius Branch Campus ====
Aberystwyth University (Mauritius Branch Campus) was built in the Quartier-Militaire, registered with the HEC and opened in 2016. All the courses at undergraduate and postgraduate level were accredited by the UK Quality Assurance Agency for Higher Education. Two years later the university closed its Mauritius campus to new enrolments due to low enrolment numbers.

==== Middlesex University Mauritius Campus ====
Middlesex University Mauritius Campus is based in Flic-en-Flac. It is registered with the HEC and opened in 2010.

== Other institutions ==
=== The Mauritius Institute of Education ===
Founded in 1973, the MIE was charged with teacher education, research in education and curriculum development. The role of the MIE as a curriculum development centre has been phased so that it is now predominantly involved in training teachers and educational research. However, it continued to play a role in curriculum planning and development, and it was entrusted with the responsibility for Curriculum Development as from October 2010. It has since produced the National Curriculum Framework for the Pre-Primary(2008), Primary (2007) and Secondary (2009) sectors. In 2015, it spearheaded the curriculum development for the Nine Year Continuous Basic Education (NYCBE). Alongside, it produced the teaching and learning Syllabi and also wrote and published some 255 textbooks to cover the whole of the 9-year spectrum from Grades 1 to 9 between 2015 and 2020. In 2023, the MIE developed a new curriculum for Technical Education for Grades 10 and 11 comprising three main areas of learning, namely Engineering Technology, Health and Hospitality, Computer Technology and Innovation. It is also responsible for the development of the teaching and learning materials and teacher training for this new stream. The Publications are available on MIE's website for consultation.

There are five schools at MIE: Applied Sciences, Education, Science and Mathematics, Arts and Humanities and a Centre for Open and Distance Learning.

It offers training to school teachers from pre-primary, primary and secondary schools, as well as managerial cadres in programme ranging from Certificate, Diploma, Post Graduate Certificate in Education and Post Graduate Diplomas. It offers B.Ed for both the Primary and Secondary Education. Masters programmes in Education, in collaboration with the University of Brighton, UK. It offers Doctoral programmes in association with the University of KwaZulu Natal, South Africa and the University of Brighton, UK. It is also associated with St Mary's University, London and offers Joint Master's and Doctoral programmes in Education, open to international students.

The MIE, through its Centre for Open & Distance Learning, is involved in the Sankore Project for digitising curriculum materials for primary and secondary schools and the introduction of interactive whiteboard technology in schools.

=== The Mahatma Gandhi Institute ===
MGI was established in 1970 as a joint government of Mauritius and government of India venture for the promotion of education and culture, with emphasis on Indian culture and traditions. It runs, within the tertiary set-up, programmes in Indian Studies, Indological Studies, Performing Arts, Fine Arts, Chinese and Mauritian Studies.

MGI has three main schools operating at the tertiary level: the School of Indian Studies, the School of Music and Fine Arts, and the School of Mauritian and Area Studies. It also runs diploma and certificate level programmes, degree level programmes in Languages, Fine Arts and Performing Arts, in collaboration with the UoM. A secondary school and the Gandhian Basic School operate within the ambit of the MGI.

=== The Mauritius College of the Air ===
MCA was established in 1971 to promote education, arts and science and culture in Mauritius through mass media. When the MCA statute was re-enacted in 1985, distance education was maintained as a major strategy to meet these objectives. Merged with the Audio-Visual Centre of the Ministry of Education and Science in 1986, the MCA has until recently been catering mainly for the primary and secondary education sector through the production of educational programmes for broadcast on radio and television. The MCA has also been producing educational materials for non-formal or continuing education, for non-broadcast use. Since the beginning of 1995, it has been involved in dispensing tertiary level programmes in collaboration with overseas institutions through the distance mode.

The MCA is being reconfigured as the Open University of Mauritius.

=== Rabindranath Tagore Institute ===
Set up in December 2002, the Rabindranath Tagore Institute has a cultural vocation and operates under the aegis of the Mahatma Gandhi Institute. It is still in an early phase of development.

== The Polytechnics ==
Two polytechnic institutions exist in the country.

- The Swami Dayanand Institute of Management runs diploma level Programmes in Information Technology, Administration and Accounting; such diploma programmes were formerly provided by the UoM.
- The Institut Supérieur de Téchnologie offers diploma level programmes (Brevét de Téchnicien Supérieur) in Electro-Technics, Mecatronics and Building Engineering. All the programmes are run on a full-time basis.

=== Technical School Management Trust Fund ===
The TSMTF was created in 1990 to manage the Polytechnics. It is administered by a Board. Industry Advisory Committees, composed of representatives of both the public and private sectors, are appointed in respect of the programmes. The committees function is to:

- establish programme objectives, curriculum content and delivery modes;
- establish terminal standards and certification;
- prescribe training equipment, hardware and software;
- prescribe training facilities and environment;
- advise on industrial training attachments;
- review programme results and diploma holders’ employment performance;
- monitor and review market demand;
- review and upgrade programmes.

=== Mauritius Institute of Training and Development (Ex:IVTB) ===
The IVTB was set up in 1988 to promote vocational education and training with the purposes of supplying workforce for the industrial, services and domestic sectors. Most of the programmes are vocational nature leading to the National Trade Certification (levels 3 and 2). As from 1998 the IVTB began tertiary level programmes at the levels of certificate and diploma in areas including Hotel Management, Automation and Information Technology.

Since 2004, the IVTB has introduced the National Trade Certificate Foundation Course for students who have completed their Prevocational Education Level 3. The course teaches Craftsmanship.

The IVTB has also introduced other courses such as IC3 for students of National Trade Certificate Level 2 and 3.

=== The Mauritius Institute of Health ===
The MIH was set up in 1989 to cater for the training needs of health professionals, local and regional. It organizes courses and programmes, mostly of short duration for medical and para-medical personnel.

=== Private institutions/distance education ===
Private institutions and organisations, which amount to more than 35, are offering programmes in Management, Accountancy and Information Technology. Most of these private institutions are local counterparts of overseas institutions and are offering programmes ranging from sub-degree to postgraduate ones through a mixed-mode system, encompassing both distance learning and face-to face tutorials. A majority of the examinations are conducted by the Mauritius Examinations Syndicate (MES) and a few are organised and invigilated by the overseas institutions themselves in collaboration with the local partner. Key players include the Charles Telfair Institute, MALEM, the Mauritius Employers Federation and the Mauritius Chamber of Commerce & Industry.

=== University of the Indian Ocean ===
The UIO, established in January 1998 under the aegis of the Indian Ocean Commission (IOC), is a network of tertiary education and research institutions of the five member states, namely Comores, Madagascar, Mauritius, Reunion and Seychelles. It offers tertiary level programmes of a regional vocation in the five member countries. During its three-year pilot phase, the secretariat of the UIO was based in Reunion. In line with a recent decision, the seat of the UIO will be a rotating one among member states.

=== Institut de la Francophonie pour L’Entrepreneuriat ===
IFE came into operation in 1999, within the context of an agreement signed between the Ministry of Education and Scientific Research and the "Association des Universités Partiellement ou Entièrement de Langue Française et L’Université des Réseaux d’Expréssion Française". It offers Masters and Doctoral programmes and undertake research in entrepreneuriat and related fields with a regional vocation.

=== Sir Seewosagur Ramgoolam Medical College [SSR] Medical College ===
SSRMC was created in 1999 and is affiliated with the University of Mauritius. It is situated at Belle Rive nearby the city of Curepipe. It caters for local and overseas students, from India, South Africa, Malaysia, Gulf and other Indian Ocean Rim countries. A report from an international monitoring committee highlighted that the teaching room of the medical college is inadequate and badly sited for clinical teaching.

The five year degree costs US$50000. Approximately 20% of seats are allocated to local students on the 5-year MBBS program which is divided into ten semesters of 6 months each and BDS course of four years followed by a one-year compulsory rotatory internship. The college offers postgraduation courses MD/MS in five specialities of Medicine, Surgery, Radio diagnosis, Anaesthesiology, and Ophthalmology. The minimum entry requirement is completion of both Cambridge SC and Cambridge HSC examinations, with a minimum requirement of AAB at HSC level. The MBBS degree Of SSR is recognised by the Medical board of California, IMED/ECFMG USA and by the World Health Organisation.

=== Indian Ocean Dental School and Hospital ===
The Indian Ocean Dental School and Hospital, managed by the R.F. Gandhi A.K. Trust Limited, began in 2003. It is affiliated to Bhavnagar University, Gujarat, India.

The institute is the key provider of dental education in the region, providing the BDS programme. The program duration is 4 years plus 1 year of internship. Further details can be accessed from www.iodsh.com

== See also ==
- Higher education
- List of tertiary institutions in Mauritius
- Indigenous education
