= Certificate of Primary Education =

School qualification in Mauritius

The Certificate of Primary Education (CPE) was an academic qualification in Mauritius awarded upon the completion of primary school. The exam last took place at the end of 2016 before it was replaced by the Primary School Achievement Certificate (PSAC) in 2017. The qualification was awarded upon earning passing marks on the primary school exams administered by the Mauritius Examinations Syndicate. Students who fully earned the qualification then progressed into secondary school to continue studying.

== Subjects ==
Certificate of Primary Education candidates were examined in the following subjects:

=== Core subjects ===
- English
- Mathematics
- French
- Science
- History and Geography

=== Optional subjects ===
- Hindi
- Urdu
- Tamil
- Telugu
- Modern Chinese
- Arabic
- Marathi

== Progression ==
Students who passed the Certificate of Primary Education upon successful completion could advance into secondary colleges, where they would begin lower secondary education. The highest achieving students generally progressed into national colleges. Lower secondary education concluded with the awarding of the Form III Certificate now known as the National Certificate of Education (NCE). Students who failed the CPE exams were given one more opportunity to re-sit the exams after repeating Grade 6.

If students failed the CPE exams, or had not received their CPE qualification by age 13, were then progressed into the Pre-vocational Certificate. As education was compulsory until age 16, this allowed those who were not able to complete their studies in the academic stream to transition onto the vocational stream and continue their formal education.

== See also ==
- Education in Mauritius
- Form III Certificate
- School Certificate (Mauritius)
- Higher School Certificate (Mauritius)
