= Education in Mauritius =

Ministry of Education and Human Resources and Ministry of Tertiary Education, Science, Research and Technology
- Minister of Education: Mahend Gungapersad

National education budget (2016)
- Budget: ₨ 16 billion

General details
- Primary languages: • English • French • Mauritian creole
- System type: National

Literacy (2022)
- Total: 91.9%
- Male: 93.6%
- Female: 90.3%
- Post secondary: 106,300

Attainment (2022)
- Post-secondary diploma: 8.8%

Education in Mauritius is managed by the Ministry of Education & Human Resources, which controls the development and administration of state schools funded by government, but also has an advisory and supervisory role in respect of private schools. The Tertiary education is maintained by the Ministry of Tertiary Education, Science, Research and Technology. The government of Mauritius provides free education to its citizens from pre-primary to tertiary levels. Since July 2005, the government also introduced free transport for all students. Schooling is compulsory up to the age of 16. Mauritian students consistently rank top in the world each year for the Cambridge International O Level, International A and AS level examinations. Among sub-Saharan African countries, Mauritius has one of the highest literacy rates. The adult literacy rate was at 91.9% in 2022. According to the 2022 census, the proportion of people with higher education has increased to 8.8%. Mauritius was ranked 57th in the Global Innovation Index in 2023, 1st in Africa.

== History ==
After the country became independent in 1968, education became one of the main preoccupations of the Mauritian Government to meet the new challenges awaiting the country. Considerable investment of resources, both human and material, has been put into the Education sector and impressive progress has been achieved in terms of free, universal, compulsory primary education, free secondary education and a fairly wide range of higher education courses at the University of Mauritius. Textbooks for students of Grades 1 to 9 have been free since 2020.

Education has been free through the secondary level since 1976 and through the post-secondary level since 1988. The government has made an effort to provide adequate funding for education, occasionally straining tight budgets and even subsidised a great part of the expenditure in the Private Confessional schools, that is, schools under the control of the Catholic Church. However, the pre-primary schools are still privately owned mostly.

== Overview ==
The Ministry of Education and Human Resources supervises and monitors all actions related to the support to be provided to education. The Mauritius Qualification Authority is the regulator of the technical and vocational education and training sector. The Tertiary education is maintained by the Ministry of Tertiary Education, Science, Research and Technology. The Tertiary Education Commission has the responsibility for allocating public funds, and fostering, planning and coordinating the development of post-secondary education and training, its strategic plan envisages Mauritius as a regional knowledge hub and a centre for higher learning and excellence. It promotes open and distance learning to increase access to post-secondary education and lifelong learning, both locally and regionally.

The education system in Mauritius is largely based on the British system since Mauritius was a former British colony. It consists of a 2+6+5+2 system of formal education. The education system in Mauritius is categorized into 4 main sectors – pre-primary, primary, secondary and tertiary. There is additionally a provision for pre-vocational and vocational education and training for school leavers and students outside of the academic stream.

Pre-primary schools accept students from the age of three. Children from the age of five to eleven go to primary school. They are admitted in Grade 1 and gradually moves on to Grade 6. Primary education ends with a national examination which is the Primary School Achievement Certificate (PSAC). Students passing PSAC gains admittance to secondary schools, those with excellent results are admitted in National secondary schools. Secondary education is normally a 7-year study, starting from Grade 7 to Grade 11 The National Assessment At Grade 9 is carried out in the third year of Secondary education. Varied subjects are taught and as from Form IV, students are streamlined according to the subjects they choose. At the end of the 5th year of study at secondary level, students sit for the Cambridge School Certificate (SC) examination. Passing the SC exam, allows them to continue another 2-year study ending with the Higher School Certificate (HSC) exam.

The teaching of English and French is compulsory in all schools. Students also have the option to learn any ancestral languages which are spoken in Mauritius, which include Arabic, Bhojpuri, Hindi, Mandarin, Marathi, Sanskrit, Tamil, Telugu and Urdu. Other languages include Italian and Spanish, in 2012 the government also introduced Mauritian Creole in primary schools. The medium of instruction varies from school.

The school year consists of thirty nine weeks, divided into 3 terms of thirteen weeks. For Secondary schools 1st Term is from 12 January to 6 April, 2nd Term from 23 April to 20 July and 3rd Term from 13 August to 1 November. For Primary schools the 1st Term is from 12 January to 6 April, 2nd Term from 23 April to 20 July and 3rd Term from 20 August to 9 November.

== Structure ==
=== Academic stream ===
The academic stream is the standard stream of education, allowing progression from primary school to secondary school to tertiary institutions. Students who aim to seek admission in higher education or foreign institutions generally follow the academic stream.

Academic Formal Education Structure
Stage	Age	Status	Pre-requisites	Class	Exams
Pre-Primary	3 – 5 Years	None	Year I Year II; Year III		
Primary	5 – 11 Years	Compulsory	Pre-Primary Education	Grade 1 (Standard I); Grade 2 (Standard II); Grade 3 (Standard IIl); Grade 4 (Standard IV) Grade 5 (Standard V); Grade 6 (Standard VI)	Primary School Achievement Certificate (PSAC)
Lower Secondary	12 – 14 Years	Compulsory	Primary School Achievement Certificate (PSAC)	Grade 7 (Form I); Grade 8 (Form II); Grade 9 (Form III)	National Certificate of Education (NCE)
Upper Secondary	15 – 18 Years	Optional	National Certificate of Education (NCE)	Grade 10 (Form IV) Grade 11 (Form V) Grade 12 (Lower VI) Grade 13 (Upper VI)	School Certificate (O Level) Higher School Certificate (A Level)
Tertiary	18+ Years	Optional	Higher School Certificate		Leads to Bachelor's, Master's, PhD, and other academic degrees

*With the introduction of the Nine Year Schooling (NYS) in January 2017, the old terminology “Standards” and "Form" has henceforth be replaced by “Grade” as shown above.

=== Vocational stream ===
Those who wish to obtain career and technical qualifications, as well as those who fail to complete any stage or obtain any qualification of the academic stream from the Certificate of Primary Education onward, may enter into the vocational stream, which provides technical and vocational training and education (TVET) in life skills and job skills for employment and independent living. The vocational stream offers options outside of the academic stream for students to complete the compulsory stages of education, and to continue their formal education beyond the compulsory years, in vocational programmes of study. Those who successfully complete the Higher National Diploma (HND), a post-secondary qualification, may then progress to the bachelor's degree with advanced standing, and thus re-enter into the academic stream of formal education, with the option to progress onto postgraduate studies in higher education.

Vocational Formal Education Structure
Qualification	Pre-requisites	Class	Progression
Pre-vocational Certificate	Standard VI of Primary Education	Form I Form II; Form III; Form IV	National Trade Certificate Foundation
National Trade Certificate Foundation	Form III Certificate or Pre-vocational Certificate	Year I Year II; Year III	National Trade Certificate II
National Trade Certificate II	National Trade Certificate Foundation	Year I Year II; Year III	National Trade Certificate III
National Trade Certificate III	National Trade Certificate II	Year I Year II; Year III	Post-secondary qualifications

== Statistics ==
The adult literacy rate for both sexes was estimated at 89.8% according to the census made by Statistics Mauritius in 2011. Male literacy was 92.3% and Female 87.3%. For the year 2011, government expenditure on education was estimated at Rs 11,709 million, representing 12.5% of total expenditure.

== Education sectors ==
=== Pre-primary education ===
Pre-primary education embraces children between 3 and 5 years old. The number of children in pre-primary schools was 33,901 out of which 51% were boys and 49% girls. The Gross Enrolment Ratio (number of students enrolled per 100 population aged 4–5) works out to 97% with an average of 13 pupils per teacher. The number of pre-primary schools in March 2011 was 1,018, that is 985 in the Island of Mauritius and 33 in Rodrigues. 75% of these schools were privately run institutions, 18% operating on government primary school premises administered by the Early Childhood Care and Education Authority and the remaining 7% were administered by either Roman Catholic or Hindu Education Authorities or Municipal/Village Councils.

=== Primary education ===
As at March 2011, there were 305 primary schools with 116,068 pupils (51% boys, 49% girls). Total staff comprised 8,266 persons with 4,227 General Purpose Teachers and 1,350 Oriental Language teachers. The Gross Enrolment Ratio (number of students enrolled per 100 population aged 6–11) is 100% and the pupil/teacher ratio 27. Children are enrolled in primary school from the age of five and enter Standard I and move automatically up to Standard VI. The system is highly competitive and a two-year preparation starts since Standard V up to Standard VI for the end of primary school examinations, the Certificate of Primary Education (CPE). The CPE is a national examination carried out by the Mauritius Examination Syndicate which devises the syllabus; prepares and prints the examinations papers and does the correction. Five subjects are compulsory and taken into account for the ranking process; English, French, Mathematics, Science, History and Geography, Oriental languages are optional. Children who fail the CPE may have one re-sit. Those who do not pass the CPE at either attempt are not eligible to join the secondary system and may enter the Technical and vocational education. After the CPE exams children are admitted to regional secondary colleges according their zones, those with the best result are admitted in National Colleges. Pass rate for CPE examination increased from 68.1% in 2009 to 68.5% in 2010.

Since 2002 the government has implemented educational programmes in some of the primary schools of the country in order to improve CPE exams results in the low achieving schools. The initiative is now known as Zones d'Education Prioritaires (Z.E.P) and in order to reach its objective, it seeks to involve the whole school community: school staff, parents, NGOs, business and community-based associations.

=== Secondary education ===
The Certificate of Primary Education (CPE) now known as Primary School Achievement Certificate (PSAC) determines admission to a secondary college. The child enters college in Form I and progresses through to Form VI, requiring seven years of schooling. From Form I to II internal examination is carried out by the schools. The domains of learning for students from Form I to Form III include: Languages (English, French, Hindi and Other Languages), Mathematics, Sciences (Biology, Chemistry, Physics), Technology (ICT, Design and Technology, Home Economics, Design, Clothing and Textiles), Health (Home Economics – Food and Nutrition and Human Development and Physical Education), Social sciences (History, Geography, Sociology) and Arts (Visual Arts, Music and Drama & Dance) and Cross curricular Domains of Learning. In the past there were no major nationally devised curriculum since each school has to plan its work according to the level of the students. In 2012, the National Assessment at Form III was introduced for students in Form III, this examination is carried out by the Mauritius Examination Syndicate.

When students reach Form IV, they have to choose at least six major subjects for their Cambridge School Certificate (SC) which is the GCE 'O' Level examinations. This examination is carried out in Form V.

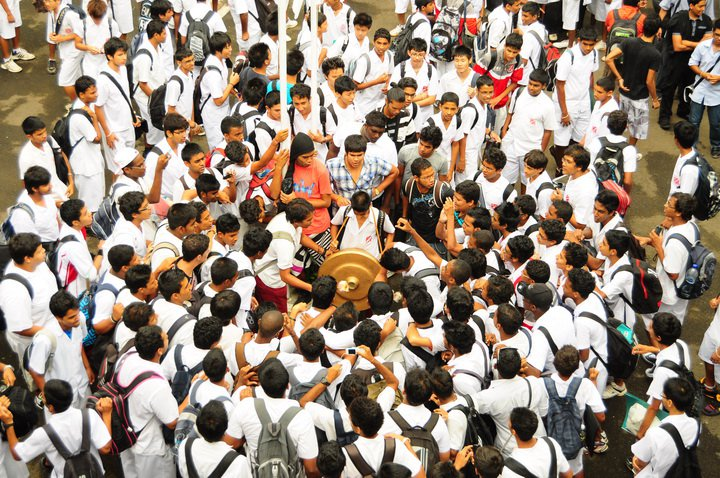
Laureate Celebration

This is followed by a two-year upper secondary education (Lower VI and Upper VI) ending with the Cambridge Higher School Certificate (HSC) that is the GCE 'A' Level. Students have to specialise in 3 main subjects and 2 subsidiary ones for the A Level examination. HSC Students have the option to compete and those with the best results win scholarship for their tertiary education. The O-Level and A-Level examinations are carried out by the University of Cambridge through University of Cambridge International Examinations, which devises the syllabus; prepares and prints the examinations papers and does the correction, in conjunction with the Mauritius Examinations Syndicate.

At March 2011, there were 180 schools providing secondary education in the academic stream. The secondary school enrolment was 115,289 (48% boys, 52% girls) and the number of teachers was 7,873. The Gross Enrolment Ratio (number of students enrolled per 100 population aged 12–19) works out to 70% and the pupil/teacher ratio 15. For the Cambridge School Certificate (SC), the pass rate improved slightly from 77.6% in 2009 to 77.8% in 2010. For the Cambridge Higher School Certificate (HSC), it decreased from 78.8% in 2009 to 78.3% in 2010.

=== Tertiary education ===
Tertiary education which started in 1924 with the College of Agriculture has since developed into a diversified system, composed of public, private, regional and overseas institutions catering for a wide range of courses and programmes. The provision of tertiary education extends beyond the local tertiary education institutions given that a significant number of Mauritian students either go overseas or resort exclusively to the open learning mode for pursuing their studies. Tertiary level enrolment went up by 6.9%, from 41,484 in 2009 to 44,334 in 2010.

Tertiary institutions in Mauritius includes colleges, universities, Institutes of Technology/Polytechnic and other technical institutions. The country's two main public universities are the University of Mauritius and University of Technology. Universities, as in most countries worldwide, have three stages: Bachelor's (undergraduate), Master's (graduate), and Doctoral degrees. Undergraduate stage lasts for at least four years and graduate stage lasts for five years after completion of secondary education or one year after obtaining a bachelor's degree. The third stage of higher education results in obtaining a PhD Degree. Private institutions and overseas institutions/bodies deliver tertiary-level programmes mostly in niche areas like Information Technology, Law, Management, Accountancy and Finance. A number of the institutions are overseas with their provisions made available through the distance education mode.

=== Technical and vocational education ===
The Government has undertaken to ensure provision of educational facilities to students till they the reach the maturity age of 16 to enter the world of work. In this context the pre-vocational sector caters for around 4,000 students ejected at the end of the primary cycle, in view of their inability to meet the established benchmark for promotion to the mainstream in the secondary sector. Since its conception in the late 90s, the Prevocational Education has been providing a second chance to pupils who have failed the CPE or who are above 13. The children previously completed a 3-year program in secondary schools in line with the National Trade Certificate Foundation Course, but this has now been supplanted by a four-year technical and vocational education and training programme. Such programmes are offered by the Mauritius Institute of Training and Development. Pre-vocational education was dispensed in 126 schools in March 2011 with an enrolment of 7,270 students (64% boys, 36% girls) and 634 teaching staff. The pupil/teacher ratio was 11.

In addition to providing pre-vocational and vocational education and training options for early school leavers, institutions of technical and vocational education also provide further education and training for greater employability and career skills enhancement as well as practical training in a number of fields.

== Private tuition ==
In recent years private tuition has become very common among students due to the competitiveness of the education system; they would usually take private tuition after school hours and during the weekend. In October 2011, the government amended the Education Act to extend the ban on private tuition to pupils in Standards I to III to those in Standard IV. The government introduced the Enhancement Programme as an alternative to private tuition for students in Standards I to IV, a programme which covers the pedagogical aspects of the respective curriculum, as well as co-curricular and extra-curricular components to render the learning experiences more enriching, enjoyable and rewarding.

== See also ==
- Education by country
- List of Mauritius-related topics
