= University of Mauritius =

Largest public university in Mauritius

Coordinates: 20°14′1.9968″S 57°29′49.3″E

- Motto: Scientia Salus Patriae
- Type: Public
- Established: 1965; 61 years ago
- Chancellor: Dr Louis Jean Claude Autrey, CSK
- Vice-Chancellor: Professor Sanjeev K Sobhee
- Pro-Chancellor & Chairman of Council: Mr Preeaduth Chitamun, CSK
- Academic staff: 303 (2015)
- Administrative staff: 720 (2015)
- Students: 12,273 (2015)
- Location: Réduit, Moka, Mauritius
- Language: English
- Colours: White and Blue
- Website: www.uom.ac.mu

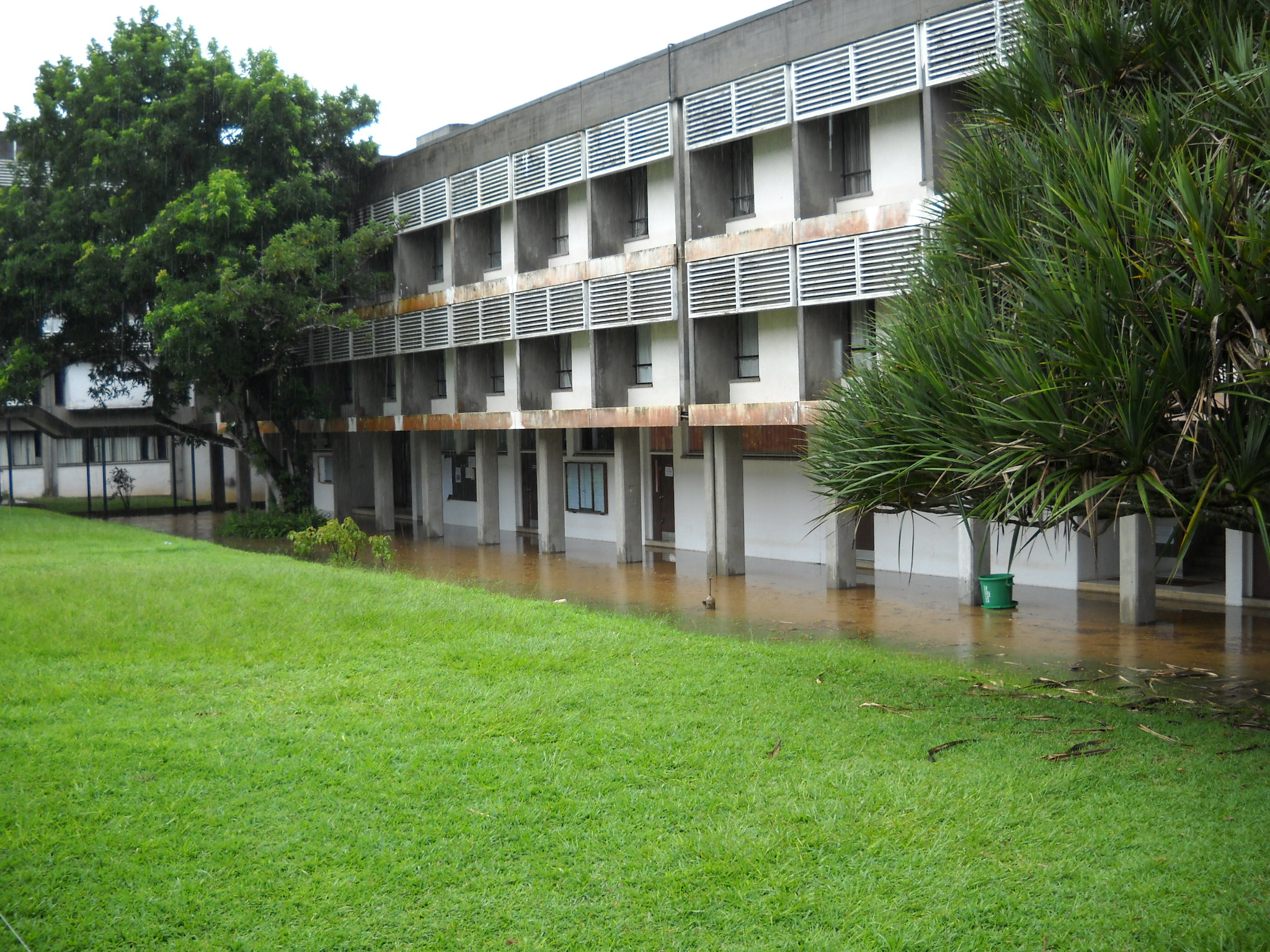
University of Mauritius, Faculty of Social Studies & Humanities.

The University of Mauritius (UoM) (French: Université de Maurice) is the national university of Mauritius. It is the oldest and largest university in the country in terms of student enrollment and the curriculum offered. The public university's main campus is located at Réduit, Moka.

== History ==
The University of Mauritius was officially established by the University of Mauritius Ordinance in December 1965, incorporating the existing School of Agriculture. In 1971, the University of Mauritius Act further defined the objectives, powers, functions and structure of the university. On 24 March 1972, Queen Elizabeth II, accompanied by Prince Philip, Duke of Edinburgh, inaugurated the University of Mauritius. The first chancellor of the university was Princess Alexandra, the Honourable Lady Ogilvy.

== Organisation ==
=== Faculty of Agriculture ===
The Faculty of Agriculture is the oldest faculty of the university. It was founded in 1914 as the School of Agriculture, and in 1966 it was incorporated into the newly established University of Mauritius. The Faculty of Agriculture operates the UoM Farm, an open laboratory of 8.5 hectares (21 acres).

The faculty comprises two departments: Agricultural & Food Science; and Agricultural Production & Systems. As of 2015, it has 415 students and 21 full-time academic staff.

=== Faculty of Engineering ===
The Faculty of Engineering was originally established as the School of Industrial Technology in 1968. It comprises five departments: Applied Sustainability and Enterprise Development; Chemical and Environmental Engineering; Civil Engineering; Electrical and Electronic Engineering; and Mechanical and Production Engineering. As of 2015, it has 2665 students and 94 full-time academic staff.

=== Faculty of Information, Communication and Digital Technologies ===
Faculty of Information, Communication and Digital Technologies (FoICDT) has been set-up to essentially respond to the significant human resource needs, in terms of quantity and quality, of the country to make Information and Communication Technology (ICT) sector the main pillar of the economy.

=== Faculty of Law & Management ===
The Faculty of Law & Management was created in 1993, when the former School of Law, Management and Social Studies was restructured. It comprises three departments: Finance and Accounting; Law; and Management. As of 2015, it has 3691 students and 51 full-time academic staff.

=== Faculty of Ocean Studies ===
The Faculty of Ocean Studies is the youngest and smallest faculty. It was established in 2014 and comprises three departments: Marine and Ocean Science, Fisheries and Mariculture; Ocean Engineering and ICT; and Maritime Trade and Finance. As of 2015, it has 13 students and 10 full-time academic staff.

=== Faculty of Science ===
The Faculty of Science was founded as School of Science in 1988. It comprises six departments: Biosciences; Chemistry; Health Sciences; Mathematics; Medicine; and Physics. As of 2015, it has 1135 students and 52 full-time academic staff.

=== Faculty of Social Studies & Humanities ===
The Faculty of Social Studies & Humanities was established in 1993, when the former School of Law, Management and Social Studies was restructured. It comprises five departments: Economics and Statistics; English Studies; French Studies; History and Political Science; and Social Studies. As of 2015, it has 2039 students and 68 full-time academic staff.

=== Centres ===
In addition to the six faculties, the University of Mauritius also includes a Centre for Innovative Lifelong Learning (CILL), a Centre for Information Technology & Systems (CITS) and a Centre for Biomedical and Biomaterials Research (CBBR).

== Students’ Union ==
The Students’ Union is run by students and represents their interests. All students are automatically members of the Students’ Union, the membership fee being included in the registration free.

== Notable alumni ==
- Audrey Albert, artist and photographer

== See also ==
- Education in Mauritius
- List of tertiary institutions in Mauritius
