= Higher School Certificate (Mauritius) =

Secondary school leaving qualification in Mauritius

The Higher School Certificate is an academic qualification in Mauritius awarded upon the completion of Grade 13, the final stage of secondary school. The qualification is awarded upon earning passing marks on the A-level exams administered by the Mauritius Examinations Syndicate, in conjunction with the University of Cambridge Local Examinations Syndicate of the Cambridge International Examinations board.

== Editions ==
=== Higher School Certificate (HSC) ===
The traditional Higher School Certificate (HSC) is the main school-leaving qualification awarded by Mauritian secondary schools. Requirements include A Levels and AS Levels in subjects chosen by the student.

Successful students may receive academic recognition and are eligible to compete for laureateship, a scholarship scheme offered by the Mauritian government for students pursuing higher education.

=== Higher School Certificate Professional Qualification (HSC Pro) ===
The Higher School Certificate Professional Qualification (HSC Pro) is an alternative school-leaving qualification with a modified curriculum and structure, which allows students to pursue both an academic curriculum and vocational training, to be prepared for tertiary studies as well as employment. The qualification was introduced as a pilot in 2015.

There are certain unique features of this qualification that distinguish it from the traditional Higher School Certificate. One is the inclusion of the Cambridge Advanced Professional in IT (CAPIT), adapted to the local context, in place of an A Level. Another is replacement of the AS English General Paper with a mandatory alternative, the AS Global Perspectives, which is designed to develop communication, analytical and research skills. Another is the Work Placement Component (WPC), a structured and supervised placement that provides practical work experience in the industry.

The structure for the qualification includes:

- 2 or 3 A Levels, including the Cambridge Advanced Professional in IT
- 2 or 3 AS Levels, including the AS Global Perspectives (Alternative to English General Paper)
- The Work Placement Component (WPC)

The alternative qualification is recognised by local and overseas universities, enabling students who successfully complete the qualification to seek admission in universities. HSC Pro students may not compete for laureateship, as can traditional HSC students, but may participate in alternative schemes provided by the Mauritian government for further studies as well as employment.

== Subjects ==
Typically 3 to 5 primary subjects are chosen to study at AS Level, and at least 3 subjects are further studied to A Level. Both the AS (Advanced Subsidiary) Level and A Level years must be completed for the full A-level qualification to be completed; an AS-level qualification may also be awarded after the first year.

=== AS-level ===
Cambridge Higher School Certificate candidates may take the following subjects at AS-level:

Syllabus Code	Subject Title	No. of Papers	Practical
8019	English General Paper	2	No
8129	French Language	2	No
8386	Sport & Physical Education	2	Yes*
8680	Arabic (AS Level)	2	No
8686	Urdu (AS Level)	2	No
8687	Hindi (AS Level)	2	No
8688	Tamil (AS Level)	2	No
8690	Telegu (AS Level)	2	No
9335	Travel & Tourism	2	Yes*
9479	Art & Design		Yes*
9487	Hinduism	2	No
9488	Islamic Studies	2	No
9609	Business Studies	2	No
9618	Computer Science	2	No
9695	Literature in English	2	No
9699	Sociology	2	No
9700	Biology	3	Yes
9706	Accounting	2	No
9708	Economics	2	No
9709	Mathematics	2	No

Additional

- Divinity
- Environmental Management
- Hindi Literature
- Arabic Language
- Chinese Language
- German Language
- Spanish Language
- Law
- Marine Science
- Thinking Skills
- Geography
- History
- Design and Technology

=== A-level ===
Cambridge Higher School Certificate candidates may take the following subjects at A2-level:

Syllabus Code	Subject Title	No. of Papers	Practical
9094	French Language	4	Yes
9335	Travel & Tourism	4	Yes*
9336	Food Studies	3	Yes*
9479	Art & Design	3	Yes*
9487	Hinduism	4	No
9488	Islamic Studies	4	No
9609	Business Studies	4	No
9618	Computer Science	4	Yes
9680	Arabic (A-Level)	4	No
9686	Urdu (A-Level)	4	No
9687	Hindi (A-Level)	4	No
9688	Tamil (A-Level)	4	No
9690	Telegu (A-level)	4	No
9695	Literature in English	4	No
9699	Sociology	4	No
9700	Biology	5	Yes
9701	Chemistry	5	Yes
9702	Physics	5	Yes
9705	Design & Technology	4	Yes*
9706	Accounting	4	No
9708	Economics	4	No
9709	Mathematics	4	No

Additional

- Divinity
- Islamic Studies
- Law
- Physical Education
- Marathi
- Marine Science
- Thinking Skills
- Geography
- History
- Psychology
- Sociology
- Music
- Chinese
- German
- Spanish

=== HSC Pro ===
Higher School Certificate Professional Qualification (HSC Pro) students additionally take the following subjects:

- Cambridge International Technical in ICT
- AS Global Perspectives

== Progression ==
Students who successfully earn the Higher School Certificate may then progress onto tertiary study. Students who are unsuccessful in obtaining the qualification may then transition from the academic stream to the vocational stream and progress onto vocational programmes of study. Students may also choose to obtain A Level qualifications at a later time.

== See also ==
- Education in Mauritius
- Form III Certificate
- Certificate of Primary Education
- School Certificate (Mauritius)
