= School Certificate (Mauritius) =

Educational qualification in Mauritius

- Ordinary Level
- Administrator: Cambridge International Examinations
- Year started: 1940s
- Duration: 2 Years
- Regions: Mauritius
- Languages: English (excluding Language Subjects)

The School Certificate is an academic qualification in Mauritius awarded upon the completion of Grade 11, the penultimate stage of secondary school. The qualification is awarded upon earning passing marks on the O-level exams administered by the Mauritius Examinations Syndicate, in conjunction with the University of Cambridge Local Examinations Syndicate of the Cambridge International Examinations board.

== Subjects ==
Typically around 6 to 10 subjects are chosen by the student to be studied at O-level. These subjects may determine the available options for future study at A-level, to be taken for the Higher School Certificate, and for tertiary study in higher education institutions.

Cambridge School Certificate candidates may take the following subjects at O-level:

Syllabus Code	Subject Title	Type	No. of Papers	Practical
1123/1125/1126	English Language (Mauritius)	Compulsory	3	No
3014	French (Mauritius)	Compulsory	2	No
4021/4029	Mathematics (Mauritius)	Compulsory	2	No
2010	Literature in English	Optional	2	No
2020	French Literature	Optional	2	No
2055	Hinduism	Optional	2	No
2068	Islamic Studies	Optional	2	No
2162	History	Optional	2	No
2210	Computer Science	Optional	2	No
2217	Geography	Optional	3	No
2251	Sociology	Optional	2	No
2281	Economics	Optional	2	No
3180	Arabic	Optional	2	No
3201	Hindi	Optional	2	No
3206	Tamil	Optional	2	No
3209	Urdu	Optional	2	No
3214	Telegu	Optional	2	No
4037	Additional Mathematics	Optional	2	No
4040	Statistics	Optional	2	No
4054	Enterprise	Optional	2	Yes*
5014	Environmental Management	Optional	2	No
5016	Physical Education	Optional	2	Yes*
5025	German	Optional	4	Yes
5038	Agriculture	Optional	2	Yes*
5054	Physics	Optional	3	No
5070	Chemistry	Optional	3	No
5090	Biology	Optional	3	No
5129	Science - Combined	Optional	3	Yes
6005	Art & Design	Optional	3	Yes*
6043	Design and Technology	Optional	3	Yes*
6065	Food and Nutrition	Optional	2	Yes
6130	Fashion and Textiles	Optional	2	Yes*
7048	Design and Communication	Optional	2	Yes*
7096	Travel and Tourism	Optional	2	No
7100	Commerce	Optional	2	No
7115	Business Studies	Optional	2	No
7707	Accounting	Optional	2	No

*This subject's practical paper may not necessarily have a fixed amount of time to work on.

== Progression ==
Students who successfully earn the qualification may then progress to study for the A-level examinations and earn the Higher School Certificate. Students who are unsuccessful in obtaining the qualification may then transition from the academic stream to the vocational stream and progress onto vocational programmes of study. Students may also choose to obtain IGCSE qualifications at a later time.

== See also ==
- Education in Mauritius
- Form III Certificate
- Certificate of Primary Education
- Higher School Certificate (Mauritius)
