= 8th National Assembly of Mauritius =

Current legislature of Mauritius

←	7th
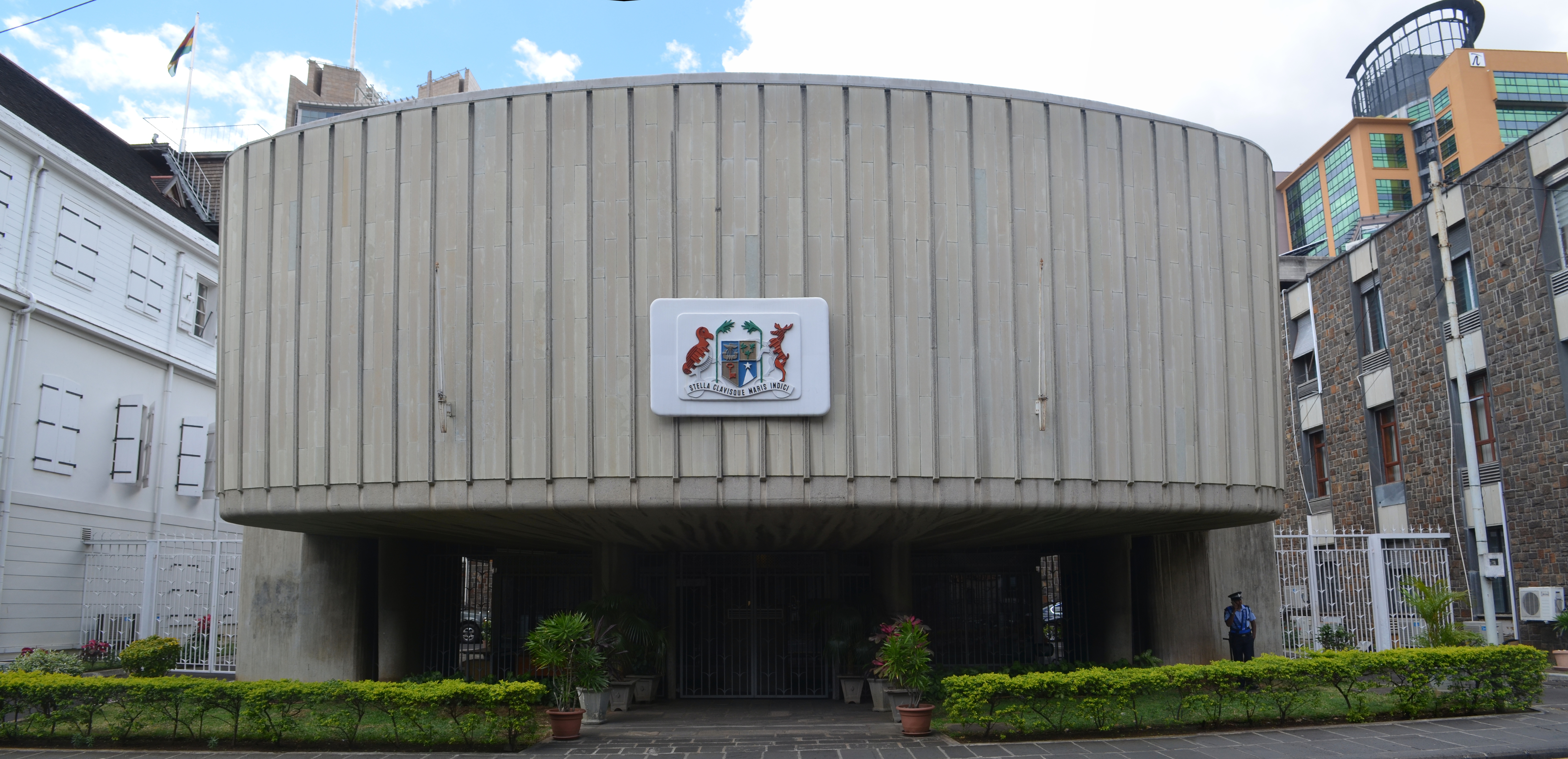
- Parliament House, Port Louis

Overview
- Legislative body: National Assembly
- Term: 29 November 2024 – present
- Election: 10 November 2024
- Government: N. Ramgoolam IV
- Website: mauritiusassembly.govmu.org

National Assembly
- Members: 66
- Speaker: Shirin Aumeeruddy-Cziffra
- Deputy Speaker: Veda Baloomoody
- Leader of the House: Navin Ramgoolam
- Leader of the Opposition: Chetan Baboolall

The 8th National Assembly of Mauritius is the current legislative meeting in Mauritius. It was opened on 29 November 2024, following the general election held on 10 November in the same year.

The Assembly was elected using the plurality block voting, with the country being divided into 21 constituencies: 20 for mainland Mauritius and one constituency for the island of Rodrigues. A total of 62 elective members are chosen to represent, with each constituency having three elective members whilst the Rodrigues constituency elects two instead. In addition, a maximum of an additional 8 members are chosen by the Election Commission under the Best Loser System (BLS), which allows a proportional representation towards underrepresented for ethnic groups of the country.

Following the election, the Alliance du Changement, a coalition between the Labour Party, Mauritian Militant Movement, New Democrats and Rezistans ek Alternativ, won in a landslide taking all but two of the elective seats to the Assembly. The Rodrigues People's Organisation took both of the elective seats of Rodrigues. This was the third time that a 60-0 result was repeated in an election. Four best loser seats were allocated after the election: two seats to the Rodrigues-based Alliance Liberation and one seat each to the Militant Socialist Movement and Parti Mauricien Social Démocrate.

Navin Ramgoolam, leader of the Labour Party and of the alliance, was appointed in as prime minister on 12 November 2024 and sworn in the following day. In the aftermath of the election, Joe Lesjongard was appointed as leader of the opposition on 15 November. He held the post until 6 August 2026, when he was replaced by Chetan Baboolall of the Fron Militan Progresis (FMP) party.

== Leadership ==
=== Presiding officers ===
- Speaker: Shirin Aumeeruddy-Cziffra
- Deputy Speaker: Veda Baloomoody (MMM)
- Deputy Chairman of Committees: Ehsan Juman (PTr)

=== Leaders ===
- Prime Minister and Leader of the House: Navin Ramgoolam (PTr)
- Leader of the Opposition: Chetan Baboolall (FMP)

=== Whips ===
- Government Chief Whip: Stéphanie Anquetil (PTr)
- Deputy Government Chief Whip: Govinden Venkatasami (MMM)
- Opposition Chief Whip: Adrien Duval (PMSD)

== Committees ==
Committee	Chair	Party	Ref.
Sessional committees
Committee of Selection	Shirin Aumeeruddy-Cziffra	Speaker	
Public Accounts Committee	Adrien Duval	PMSD	
Standing Orders Committee	Shirin Aumeeruddy-Cziffra	Speaker	
House Committee	Veda Baloomoody	MMM	
Broadcasting Committee	Patrick Assirvaden	PTr	
Parliamentary Gender Caucus	Shirin Aumeeruddy-Cziffra	Speaker	
Committees established by Act
Financial Crimes Commission	Dhaneshwar Damry	PTr	

== Party composition ==
Affiliation	Party (shading shows control)										Total	Vacant
Affiliation	PTr	MMM	ND	ReA	OPR	AL	MSM	PMSD	FMP	IND	Total	Vacant
Begin (29 November 2024)	35	19	3	3	2	2	1	1	—	—	66	0
4 February 2025 (Note: Franco Quirin, MP for Beau Bassin and Petite Rivière, was expelled from the MMM on 4 February 2025 and began sitting as an independent.)	35	18	3	3	2	2	1	1	—	1	66	0
13 April 2026 (Note: MMM MPs Paul Bérenger, Joanna Bérenger and Chetan Baboolall decided to leave the government benches on 5 April 2026 and declared themselves as "independent backbenchers". However, a clarification the following day from the trio reiterated that they intended to sit with the government as backbenchers until such time they have finalised their decisions. On 13 April 2026, the three MPs collectively resigned from the MMM after the party's Assembly of Delegates voted to remain in government on 12 April 2026.)	35	15	3	3	2	2	1	1	—	4	66	0
9 May 2026 (Note: Following a founding congress on 9 May 2026, Paul and Joanna Bérenger and Chetan Baboolall formed the Fron Militan Progresis, a new political party led by Paul Bérenger in the interim.)	35	15	3	3	2	2	1	1	3	1	66	0
20 October 2026 (Note: Sydney Pierre resigned from the Labour Party on 16 October 2026. He joined the FMP once parliament reconvened several days later.)	34	15	3	3	2	2	1	1	4	1	66	0

== Members ==
Constituency		MP	Party	MP since	Notes
1	Grand River North West– Port Louis West	Fabrice David	PTr	2019–present	Reelected
1	Grand River North West– Port Louis West	Arianne Navarre-Marie	MMM	1982–1983; 1995–2014; 2019–present	Reelected; previously MP for Savanne–Black River
1	Grand River North West– Port Louis West	Kugan Parapen	ReA	2024–present	Elected
2	Port Louis South– Port Louis Central	Osman Mahomed	PTr	2014–present	Reelected
2	Port Louis South– Port Louis Central	Reza Uteem	MMM	2010–present	Reelected
2	Port Louis South– Port Louis Central	Ismaël Aumeer	PTr	2019–present	Reelected
3	Port Louis Maritime– Port Louis East	Ehsan Juman	PTr	2019–present	Reelected
3	Port Louis Maritime– Port Louis East	Shakeel Mohamed	PTr	2005–present	Reelected; previously MP for Rivière des Anguilles–Souillac
3	Port Louis Maritime– Port Louis East	Aadil Ameer Meea	MMM	2010–present	Reelected
4	Port Louis North– Montagne Longue	Anabelle Savabaddy	PTr	2024–present	Elected
4	Port Louis North– Montagne Longue	Ashok Subron	ReA	2024–present	Elected
4	Port Louis North– Montagne Longue	Ludovic Caserne	MMM	2024–present	Elected
4	Port Louis North– Montagne Longue	Adrien Duval	PMSD	2014–2019; 2024–present	Best Loser; previously MP for Cuprepipe–Midlands and served as Speaker from July to October 2024
4	Port Louis North– Montagne Longue	Joe Lesjongard	MSM	2000–present	Best Loser; Reelected; previously MP for Savanne–Black River
5	Pamplemousses–Triolet	Navin Ramgoolam	PTr	1991–2014; 2024–present	Leader of the House
5	Pamplemousses–Triolet	Ranjiv Woochit	PTr	2019–present	Reelected
5	Pamplemousses–Triolet	Kaviraj Rookny	PTr	2024–present	Elected
6	Grand Baie–Poudre D'Or	Mahend Gungapersad	PTr	2019–present	Reelected
6	Grand Baie–Poudre D'Or	Nitish Beejan	PTr	2024–present	Elected
6	Grand Baie–Poudre D'Or	Ram Etwareea	MMM	2024–present	Elected
7	Piton–Rivière du Rempart	Sandeep Prayag	PTr	2024–present	Elected
7	Piton–Rivière du Rempart	Raj Pentiah	PTr	2024–present	Elected
7	Piton–Rivière du Rempart	Kaviraj Sukon	PTr	2024–present	Elected
8	Quartier Militaire–Moka	Dhaneshwar Damry	PTr	2024–present	Elected
8	Quartier Militaire–Moka	Babita Thanoo	ReA	2024–present	Elected
8	Quartier Militaire–Moka	Govinden Venkatasami	MMM	2024–present	Elected
9	Flacq–Bon Accueil	Anil Bachoo	PTr	1991–1995; 2000–2014; 2024–present	
9	Flacq–Bon Accueil	Raviraj Beechook	PTr	2024–present	Elected
9	Flacq–Bon Accueil	Chandaprakash Ramkalawon	PTr	2024–present	Elected
10	Montagne Blanche– Grand River South East	Chetan Baboolall	FMP	2024–present	Elected
10	Montagne Blanche– Grand River South East	Avinash Ramtohul	PTr	2024–present	Elected
10	Montagne Blanche– Grand River South East	Reza Saumtally	PTr	2024–present	Elected
11	Vieux Grand Port–Rose Belle	Anishta Babooram	PTr	2024–present	Elected
11	Vieux Grand Port–Rose Belle	Manoj Seeburn	PTr	2024–present	Elected
11	Vieux Grand Port–Rose Belle	Ashley Ramdass	PTr	2024–present	Elected
12	Mahébourg–Plaine Magnien	Ritish Ramful	PTr	2014–present	Reelected
12	Mahébourg–Plaine Magnien	Tony Apollon	MMM	2024–present	Elected
12	Mahébourg–Plaine Magnien	Kevin Lukeeram	PTr	2024–present	Elected
13	Rivière des Anguilles–Souillac	Rajen Narsinghen	PTr	2024–present	Elected
13	Rivière des Anguilles–Souillac	Roshan Jhummun	PTr	2024–present	Elected
13	Rivière des Anguilles–Souillac	Rubna Daureeawo	PTr	2024–present	Elected
14	Savanne–Black River	Arvin Babajee	PTr	2024–present	Elected
14	Savanne–Black River	Ravin Jagarnath	MMM	2024–present	Elected
14	Savanne–Black River	Véronique Leu-Govind	ND	2024–present	Elected
15	La Caverne–Phoenix	Khushal Lobine	ND	2019–present	Reelected
15	La Caverne–Phoenix	Patrick Assirvaden	PTr	2010–present	Reelected
15	La Caverne–Phoenix	Fawzi Allymun	MMM	2024–present	Elected
16	Vacoas–Floréal	Joanna Bérenger	FMP	2019–present	Reelected
16	Vacoas–Floréal	Jyoti Jeetun	MMM	2024–present	Elected
16	Vacoas–Floréal	Mahendra Gondeea	PTr	2024–present	Elected
17	Curepipe–Midlands	Michael Sik Yuen	PTr	2010–2014; 2019–present	Reelected
17	Curepipe–Midlands	Richard Duval	ND	2019–present	Reelected; previously MP for Mahebourg–Plaine Magnien
17	Curepipe–Midlands	Ajay Gunness	MMM	1995–2010; 2024–present	Previously MP for Flacq–Bon Accueil and Montagne Blanche–GRSE
18	Belle Rose–Quatre Bornes	Arvin Boolell	PTr	1987–2014; 2017–present	Reelected; previously MP for Vieux Grand Port–Rose Belle
18	Belle Rose–Quatre Bornes	Stéphanie Anquetil	PTr	2010–2014; 2019–present	Reelected; previously MP for Vacoas–Floréal
18	Belle Rose–Quatre Bornes	Veda Baloomoody	MMM	1995–2005; 2010–2019; 2024–present	Previously MP for Quartier Militaire–Moka, Rivière des Anguilles–Souillac and GRNW–Port Louis West
19	Stanley–Rose Hill	Paul Bérenger	FMP	1976–1987; 1991–1994; 1995–present	Reelected; previously MP for Belle Rose–Quatre Bornes
19	Stanley–Rose Hill	Deven Nagalingum	MMM	2000–2005; 2010–present	Reelected; previously MP for Quartier Militaire–Moka
19	Stanley–Rose Hill	Sydney Pierre	FMP	2024–present	Elected
20	Beau Bassin–Petite Rivière	Rajesh Bhagwan	MMM	1983–present	Reelected
20	Beau Bassin–Petite Rivière	Karen Foo Kune	MMM	2019–present	Reelected
20	Beau Bassin–Petite Rivière	Franco Quirin	MMM	2010–present	Reelected
21	Rodrigues	Marie Roxana Collet	OPR	2024–present	Elected
21	Rodrigues	Francisco François	OPR	2010–present	Reelected
21	Rodrigues	Dianette Henriette-Manan	AL	2024–present	Best Loser
21	Rodrigues	Jacques Édouard	AL	2024–present	Best Loser

== Changes in membership ==
Constituency	Before		Change		After		
Constituency	Member	Party	Type	Date	Date	Member	Party
Beau Bassin and Petite Rivière	Franco Quirin	MMM	Expulsion from party	2 February 2025	4 February 2025	Franco Quirin	Ind
Stanley and Rose Hill	Paul Bérenger	MMM	Resignation from party	13 April 2026	9 May 2026	Paul Bérenger	FMP
Vacoas and Floréal	Joanna Bérenger	MMM	Resignation from party	13 April 2026	9 May 2026	Joanna Bérenger	FMP
Montagne Blanche and Grand River South East	Chetan Baboolall	MMM	Resignation from party	13 April 2026	9 May 2026	Chetan Baboolall	FMP
Stanley and Rose Hill	Sydney Pierre	PTr	Resignation from party	16 October 2026	20 October 2026	Sydney Pierre	FMP
