= Alliance du Changement =

Centre-left political coalition in Mauritius

Alliance for Change Alliance du Changement Lalyans pou Sanzman
- Abbreviation: AdC / Changement
- Leader: Navin Ramgoolam
- Founders: Navin Ramgoolam; Paul Bérenger; Richard Duval; Ashok Subron
- Founded: 9 October 2024
- Registered: 11 October 2024
- Coalition members: Labour Party; Mauritian Militant Movement; New Democrats; Rezistans ek Alternativ
- Colours: Red; Purple; Yellow; Blue
- Slogan: Nou Pays, Nou Priorité (English: "Our Country, Our Priority")
- National Assembly: 56 / 66
- Municipal Councils: 117 / 120

Website
- changement.mu

The Alliance du Changement, also known as Alliance for Change (Morisyen: Lalyans pou Sanzman), is a coalition of parties in Mauritius.

== History ==
The formation of the Alliance du Changement was announced on 9 October 2024 in preparation for the November 2024 Mauritian general election by Richard Duval, Navin Ramgoolam and Paul Bérenger of the New Democrats (ND), Labour Party (PTr) and Mauritian Militant Movement (MMM) respectively, ahead of the official registration of the coalition which occurred on 11 October 2024. A fourth party, Rezistans ek Alternativ (ReA) by Ashok Subron, later joined this coalition.

At the 2025 municipal elections, Alliance du Changement won all seats on the Curepipe and Quatre Bornes municipal councils, and lost only one in Beau Bassin-Rose Hill, Port Louis and Vacoas-Phoenix. The Labour Party, MMM and ReA contested all five councils, while the New Democrats only ran candidates in Curepipe and Vacoas-Phoenix.

== 2024 general election ==
=== Electoral manifesto ===
On 29 October 2024, Alliance du Changement announced 25 key measures in their electoral manifesto.

1. Priority in the fight against price increases: creation of a support fund of 10 billion Rupees to stabilize essential basic products and reduce the burden on families.
2. New economic model, with the creation of a Master Plan focused on the green economy, new technologies and the ocean economy.
3. Guarantee that the old age pension, pension for the disabled and other social benefits will be gradually increased to reach a minimum of Rs 21,500 during our mandate.
4. Reduction in the price of gasoline and diesel, reorganization of the CEB for a reduction in electricity prices; Free Internet for every family.
5. Free public transport for all, including school vans; rethinking, modernizing and going green in the bus industry to offer an efficient, reliable service that complies with safety standards.
6. Reduction in drug prices and vouchers for the purchase of drugs unavailable in public health centers.
7. Full coverage of overseas treatment costs for patients, regardless of age, when treatment is not available locally, and establishment of a Diabetes and Foot Care Unit in each regional hospital.
8. A new Master Plan on drugs which will take into account the need to facilitate the rehabilitation of drug addicts and their reintegration into society.
9. Abolition of the Tax on income of less than Rs 1M, on the Basic Retirement Pension, the Basic Invalid's Pension and other social benefits and tax exemption for taxpayers aged 18 to 28.
10. Return to the old criteria of 3 credits for admission to Grade 12 leading to the HSC and creation of a digital platform to ensure continuity in the teaching and learning process.
11. One-off payment of registration fees only on the purchase of a new vehicle.
12. Improve water supplies in all regions through productive investments in collection, treatment and distribution; replacement of defective conduits.
13. Make the Land Drainage Master Plan public and rationalize the construction of drains to minimize the risk of flooding.
14. Reorganize and revitalize horse racing events, including the revival of Champ de Mars, and amend the Animal Welfare Act for better animal protection, along with the construction of a 24-hour animal hospital.
15. National renovation and development initiatives for residences, alongside the restructuring and revitalization of social housing programs.
16. Immediately overhaul the port, airport, and Air Mauritius, coupled with substantial investment in agriculture, fishing and livestock in order to boost the economy and ensure food security.
17. Construction of a fully equipped concert hall for holding artistic events, including musical concerts, and transformation of one of the football stadiums into a venue for musical concerts.
18. Creation of a special fund from national lottery revenues to support elite athletes, including their participation in regional events, and ensure their training is free.
19. Guarantee the independence and impartiality of the Mauritius Broadcasting Corporation in the Constitution, abolish the fee of Rs 150 and introduction of private television channels.
20. A real electoral reform with at least a third of women on the list of party candidates for the general elections, a transparent law on the financing of political parties; an anti-defector law and the introduction of the Freedom of Information Act.
21. Election of the President of the Republic by an electoral college and of a Speaker of the National Assembly whose independence and impartiality are guaranteed in the Constitution.
22. Strengthening the independence and powers of the DPP in the Constitution.
23. Restore the prestige and independence of the police force and replace the SSS/NIU.
24. Replacement of the Financial Crimes Commission with a powerful anti-corruption institution and replacement of the ADSU with a multidisciplinary institution to combat drug trafficking and use.
25. Implementation of innovative solutions aimed at achieving "zero waste" and "zero landfill" objectives, by reducing the landfilling of domestic waste and creating added value through processes such as composting, recycling, energy recovery from waste, as well as the secure treatment of medical waste to eliminate any biological risk.

=== Candidates ===
The alliance fielded a total of 60 candidates for the 2024 general election, with the Labour Party being allocated 35 candidates, the MMM with 19 candidates and New Democrats and ReA each both having 3 candidates. Following the election, the alliance won 60 of the 62 constituency seats in the National Assembly, obtaining a supermajority, with all of the fielded candidates winning a seat in the Assembly.

| Constituency | | Candidate 1 | | Candidate 2 | | Candidate 3 | |
|---|---|---|---|---|---|---|---|
| 1 | GRNO–Port-Louis Ouest | Fabrice David | PTr | Arianne Navarre-Marie | MMM | Kugan Parapen | ReA |
| 2 | Port-Louis Sud–Port-Louis Centre | Osman Mahomed | PTr | Farhad Aumeer | PTr | Reza Uteem | MMM |
| 3 | Port-Louis Maritime–Port-Louis Est | Shakeel Mohamed | PTr | Ehsan Juman | PTr | Aadil Ameer Meea | MMM |
| 4 | Port-Louis Nord–Montagne Longue | Ashok Subron | ReA | Anabelle Savabaddy | PTr | Ludovic Caserne | MMM |
| 5 | Pamplemousses–Triolet | Navin Ramgoolam | PTr | Ranjiv Woochit | PTr | Kaviraj Rookny | PTr |
| 6 | Grand Baie–Poudre d'Or | Mahend Gungapersad | PTr | Nitish Beejan | PTr | Ram Etwareea | MMM |
| 7 | Piton–Rivière du Rempart | Raj Pentiah | PTr | Sandeep Prayag | PTr | Kaviraj Sukon | PTr |
| 8 | Quartier Militaire–Moka | Dhaneshwar Damry | PTr | Babita Thanoo | ReA | Govinden Venkatasami | MMM |
| 9 | Flacq–Bon Accueil | Anil Bachoo | PTr | Avinash Ramkalawon | PTr | Raviraj Beechook | PTr |
| 10 | Montagne Blanche–GRSE | Reza Saumtally | PTr | Avinash Ramtohul | PTr | Chetan Baboolall | MMM |
| 11 | Vieux Grand Port–Rose Belle | Ashley Ramdass | PTr | Anishta Babooram | PTr | Manoj Seeburn | PTr |
| 12 | Mahébourg–Plaine Magnien | Dhananjay Ramful | PTr | Kevin Lukeeram | PTr | Tony Apollon | MMM |
| 13 | Rivière des Anguilles–Souillac | Rajen Narsinghen | PTr | Rubna Daureeawo | PTr | Roshan Jhummun | PTr |
| 14 | Savanne–Rivière Noire | Véronique Leu-Govind | ND | Ravin Jagarnath | MMM | Arvin Babajee | PTr |
| 15 | La Caverne–Phœnix | Khushal Lobine | ND | Patrick Assirvaden | PTr | Fawzi Allymun | MMM |
| 16 | Vacoas–Floréal | Joanna Bérenger | MMM | Jyoti Jeetun | MMM | Mahendra Gondeea | PTr |
| 17 | Curepipe–Midlands | Michael Sik Yuen | PTr | Ajay Gunness | MMM | Richard Duval | ND |
| 18 | Belle Rose–Quatre Bornes | Arvin Boolell | PTr | Stéphanie Anquetil | PTr | Veda Baloomoody | MMM |
| 19 | Stanley–Rose Hill | Paul Bérenger | MMM | Deven Nagalingum | MMM | Sydney Pierre | PTr |
| 20 | Beau Bassin–Petite Rivière | Rajesh Bhagwan | MMM | Karen Foo Kune | MMM | Franco Quirin | MMM |

== Election results ==
=== Legislative elections ===
| Election | Leader | Votes | % | Seats | +/– | Position | Status |
|---|---|---|---|---|---|---|---|
| 2024 | Navin Ramgoolam | 1,438,333 | 61.38 | 60 / 66 | ▲39 | ▲1st | Coalition |
