= 2024 Mauritian general election =

- 10 November 2024

All 62 directly elected seats in the National Assembly (and up to 8 BLS seats)
- Turnout: 79.29% (▲2.28pp)
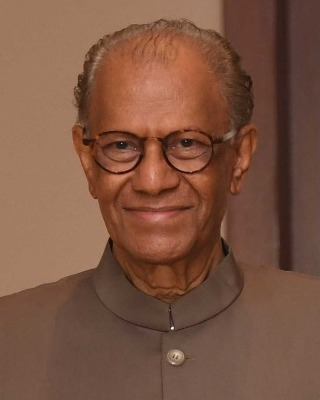

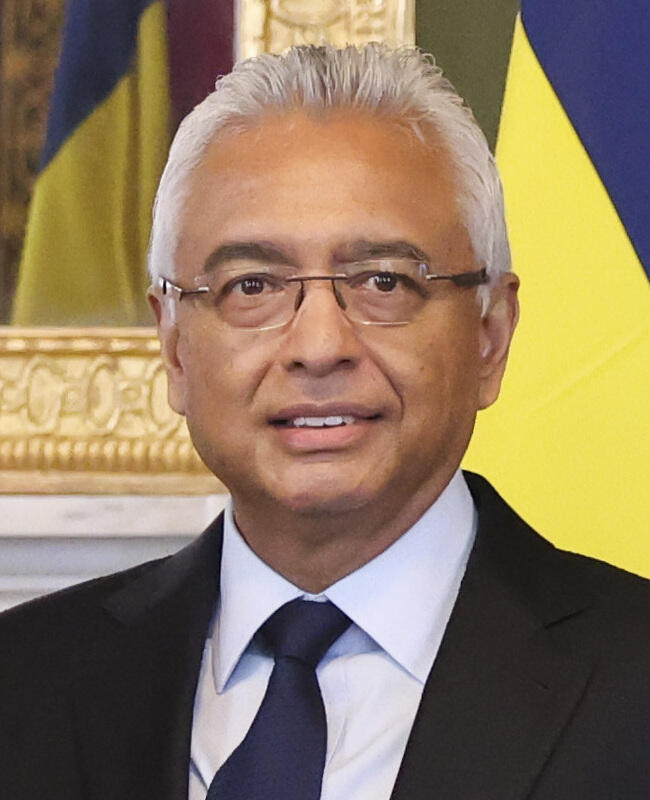
	First party	Second party
Leader	Navin Ramgoolam	Pravind Jugnauth
Party	Labour	MSM
Alliance	AdC	Alliance Lepep
Seats won	35	1
Seat change	▲23	▼35
Popular vote	847,253	486,065
Percentage	36.16%	20.74%
Alliance seats	60	2
Popular vote	1,438,333	639,372
Alliance %	61.38%	27.29%
- Alliance results by constituency. The colour shade shows the percentage of the elected candidate with the highest number of votes
Prime Minister before election
Pravind Jugnauth
MSM
Subsequent Prime Minister
Navin Ramgoolam
Labour

General elections were held in Mauritius on 10 November 2024. The election was called after the government reached a deal with the United Kingdom to end the Chagos Archipelago dispute. Shortly before the election, a wire-tapping scandal surfaced. The government responded by implementing a social media ban that was to last until after the election but was instead lifted a day later following public outcry. Pravind Jugnauth became prime minister in 2017, succeeding his father Anerood Jugnauth. Alliances that contested the election included Jugnauth's Alliance Lepep, which comprised the Militant Socialist Movement (MSM), Muvman Liberater (ML), Muvman Patriot Morisien (MPM), Parti Mauricien Social Démocrate (PMSD) and Plateforme Militante (PM). Alliance du Changement (AdC), led by Navin Ramgoolam, comprised the Labour Party, former Prime Minister Paul Bérenger's Mauritian Militant Movement (MMM), the New Democrats (ND) and Rezistans ek Alternativ (ReA). Key campaign issues included the cost of living, crime and corruption. A total of 1,002,857 registered voters were eligible to vote.

Votes were counted on 11 November, with turnout at 79%, the highest since 2010. Alliance du Changement won the election in a landslide, winning all but one of the country's 21 constituencies. Jugnauth conceded defeat shortly after vote counting began. It was the largest margin of victory since 1995. Four unsuccessful candidates were appointed through the Best Loser System, including two from Alliance Lepep and two from Alliance Liberation. Due to the plurality block voting system, total votes exceed the total number of registered electors. Ramgoolam was sworn in as prime minister on 13 November, and his cabinet was inaugurated on 22 November.

== Background ==
At the 2019 snap election, the governing Alliance Morisien, led by Prime Minister Pravind Jugnauth, won re-election, securing 42 seats. The opposition Alliance Nationale, led by former Prime Minister Navin Ramgoolam, won 17 seats. Former Prime Minister Paul Bérenger's Mauritian Militant Movement secured nine, and the Rodrigues People's Organisation retained its two seats. Due to the electoral system, Alliance Morisien was able to secure a majority of seats despite only obtaining 37% of the popular vote. Jugnauth succeeded his father, Anerood Jugnauth, as prime minister in 2017, which was met with accusations of nepotism by the opposition. Observers attributed the government's victory to economic growth and the commencement of infrastructure projects. The opposition and civil society groups alleged irregularities, including reports of misplaced ballots and inadequately trained election workers.

After the election, Surendra Dayal, who unsuccessfully contested Prime Minister Jugnauth's constituency of Quartier Militare and Moka, filed a lawsuit seeking to overturn the constituency's result. Dayal claimed that Jugnauth and the other two successful candidates, who were also from Alliance Morisien, had engaged in bribery and undue influence to win their seats. The case was dismissed on appeal in 2023.

=== 2020 oil spill and protests ===
In July 2020, a Japanese-controlled bulk carrier, Wakashio, crashed into a coral reef off the coast of south-eastern Mauritius, near Mahébourg, resulting in an oil spill. The Jugnauth government declared a national emergency on 7 August. The incident, which occurred near two environmentally protected marine ecosystems, resulted in a setback for the tourism and fisheries sectors, on which Mauritius is highly dependent. The environmental damage and the death of wildlife sparked public outcry, and the government response faced criticism for a perceived failure to hold foreign actors accountable. As a result, protests broke out, a rare occurrence in Mauritius that saw an attendance of around 100,000.

=== Wire-tapping scandal ===
In October 2024, a wire-tapping scandal broke out; the phone calls of numerous journalists, politicians, civil society members and foreign diplomats were reportedly tapped and leaked on the internet. Prime Minister Jugnauth and the Mauritius Police Force claimed that artificial intelligence had modified the leaked calls. Journalists affected by the tapping, however, said the calls were authentic. One journalist alleged the government's AI claims were an attempt to deflect attention from the scandal's fallout.

Jugnauth announced an emergency committee would investigate the breach. Citing national security concerns, the government implemented a social media ban on 1 November, to last until the day after the election. Four suspects, including a former CEO of Mauritius Telecom, were arrested that day. The opposition claimed the ban was politically motivated and aimed at preventing the Jugnauth government's defeat at the polls. Following widespread public uproar, the government reversed the ban on 2 November.

=== Chagos Archipelago agreement ===
On 3 October, the Mauritian government announced an agreement with the United Kingdom had been reached that would end the Chagos Archipelago dispute over the British Indian Ocean Territory, subject to a final treaty. The UK would relinquish the archipelago's sovereignty to Mauritius; however, Diego Garcia, which hosts a United States military base, would be leased for 99 years. Jugnauth said the lease would provide Mauritius with "billions of rupees". The deal was met with varied reactions by the exiled Chagossians. While they praised the agreement as a likely step to return to the archipelago, many Chagossians criticised the Mauritian and British governments for failing to include them in the negotiations. Navin Ramgoolam and Paul Bérenger welcomed the transfer of the archipelago but criticised Jugnauth for agreeing to the lease of Diego Garcia. The Linion Moris party accused Jugnauth of using the deal for political gain. The day after the announcement, on 4 October, Jugnauth called the election.

== Electoral system ==
Constituencies used for the 2024 general election

The National Assembly has 62 directly elected members; 60 represent 20 three-seat constituencies, and two are elected from a constituency on the island of Rodrigues. The elections are held using the plurality block vote system with panachage, whereby voters have as many votes as seats available. The Electoral Commission divides the electorate into four communities: Hindus, Muslims, Sino-Mauritians and the general population; the latter comprises voters who do not belong to the first three. Mauritius employs the Best Loser System (BLS) to ensure all communities are guaranteed parliamentary representation proportional to their percentage of the population. If a community's share of MPs does not match its population percentage after a general election, the Electoral Supervisory Commission can appoint up to eight of the highest polling unsuccessful candidates from that community. The first four BLS members are selected regardless of their political affiliation. The other four are chosen from the party that has received the highest percentage of votes nationwide, to prevent BLS from changing an election outcome. Unless the president dissolves the National Assembly early, members serve a five-year term.

Eligible candidates and voters are required to be at least 18 years old, citizens of the Commonwealth and have resided in Mauritius for at least two years before the nomination date. A total of 1,002,857 individuals were registered to vote in this election. Public officials stationed in Mauritius but enrolled in constituencies in Rodrigues or Agaléga and vice versa are eligible to apply for proxy voting. Since 2014, it has been optional for candidates to declare which community they belong to. Contestants who refuse to affiliate with a community are ineligible for a Best Loser nomination. Candidates have to be proficient enough in English to participate in parliamentary procedures. They also require the nomination from at least six electors in their constituency and a deposit to be paid, which is refunded if they obtain at least 10% of the vote. Individuals ineligible to be contestants include those who have committed electoral offences, have served a prison sentence exceeding 12 months, have undisclosed government contracts or have undisclosed bankruptcy.

== Parties and candidates ==
The candidate nomination deadline was on 22 October. A total of 73 parties were registered to contest the election. Two major coalitions announced their participation in the elections: Alliance Lepep, formed in 2014 and led by Prime Minister Pravind Jugnauth, and Ramgoolam's Alliance du Changement, formed shortly before the nomination day. In addition to Jugnauth's Militant Socialist Movement, other member parties of Alliance Lepep include Parti Mauricien Social Démocrate, Muvman Liberater, Plateforme Militante and Muvman Patriot Morisien. Parties in Alliance du Changement included Ramgoolam's Labour Party, former Prime Minister Paul Bérenger's Mauritian Militant Movement, Rezistans ek Alternativ and the New Democrats. A total of 891 candidates contested the election, Alliance Lepep and Alliance du Changement fielded 60 candidates each. There were 514 independent contestants, and the remaining candidates were affiliated with other parties or alliances. Only 165 contestants were women, while 273 were under the age of 40. As in the 2019 election, the Rodrigues People's Organisation only contested the Rodrigues constituency.

Major alliance	Member parties	Alliance leader	Candidates
Alliance Lepep	Militant Socialist Movement	Pravind Jugnauth	40
Alliance Lepep	Parti Mauricien Social Démocrate	Pravind Jugnauth	10
Alliance Lepep	Muvman Liberater	Pravind Jugnauth	5
Alliance Lepep	Muvman Patriot Morisien	Pravind Jugnauth	3
Alliance Lepep	Plateforme Militante	Pravind Jugnauth	2
Alliance du Changement	Labour Party	Navin Ramgoolam	35
Alliance du Changement	Mauritian Militant Movement	Navin Ramgoolam	19
Alliance du Changement	New Democrats	Navin Ramgoolam	3
Alliance du Changement	Rezistans ek Alternativ	Navin Ramgoolam	3

== Campaign ==
Major issues among voters included the cost of living crisis, corruption and crime. Many Mauritians called for government-sponsored rehabilitation and education to combat the rising rates of drug use in the country. A July 2024 Afrobarometer survey showed that Mauritians considered drug addiction and abuse to be the second-most important issue after the cost of living.

Alliance Lepep announced a manifesto on 28 October. The alliance emphasised a commitment to economic reform and social welfare. The bloc proposals included a monthly allowance of 2000 rupees for stay-at-home mothers, the establishment of a fund to assist students from low-income families, and a special tribunal to expedite criminal drug cases. In light of the wire-tapping scandal, the bloc promised the creation of an independent body that would combat phone-tapping. Other initiatives included free prescription medicine and signing a final treaty with the UK to seal the Chagos Islands agreement. It also pledged to finance economic programs using payments made to be made by the UK under the revised agreement over the Chagos Islands.

Alliance du Changement launched a manifesto on 29 October. Proposals included tax exemptions for citizens aged 18 to 28, measures to end fuel shortages, the introduction of a green economy and free public transport. The alliance also pledged to enact electoral reform, including transparent campaign finance laws, a quota ensuring one-third of all party candidates are women, legislation against party switching in parliament, and a Freedom of Information Act. The bloc advocated eliminating income taxes for citizens earning less than 77,000 Mauritian Rupees per month.

The Linion Reform alliance made up of the Linion Moris party and the Reform Party was formed in October 2024. Linion Reform presented itself as an alternative to the Alliance du Changement and Alliance Lepep, with the slogan "neither Navin nor Pravind". Led by Nando Bodha and Roshi Bhadain, Linion Reform called for more transparency and combatting corruption. The alliance sought to abolish the value-added tax and establish a scholarship for individuals aged 35 to 55 seeking to change careers. Bhadain, who resigned from the governing coalition in 2017, criticised his former bloc for an alleged lack of accomplishments in its previous term and claimed the Ramgoolam-led bloc had been an ineffective opposition.

== Conduct ==
President Prithvirajsing Roopun dissolved parliament and issued the election writ on 4 October. The early dissolution cancelled a by-election in the constituency of Montagne-Blanche/GRSE, which was scheduled for 9 October. The Southern African Development Community (SADC) sent a delegation, headed by former chief justice of Tanzania, Mohamed Chande Othman, to observe the elections. Polling stations were open from 7:00 to 18:00. Voting centres in Agaléga and Rodrigues opened at 6:00, closing at 10:00 in Agaléga and 17:00 in Rodrigues. Vote counting began the day after the election.

Numerous incidents of unrest occurred throughout the country on 9 November, following claims of election fraud on social media. Some election officials were reportedly harassed. Jugnauth, Ramgoolam and Electoral Commissioner Irfan Rahman called for ease of tensions. Jugnauth claimed that Bérenger and Ramgoolam's alleged claims of election rigging had incited the turmoil. The Electoral Commission reported that some election workers had failed to arrive at their designated polling stations due to fears of further unrest. A consultant for the Electoral Commission, Rabin Bhujun, assured that votes were counted according to schedule. A ban of gatherings within 200 metres of counting centres was implemented until the announcement of the official results. The SADC mission stated that the election was free and fair. Othman called on political parties to field more female and younger candidates in future elections, noting the disproportionately low number of contestants from these cohorts. The mission criticised the 24 hour social media ban that followed the wire-tapping scandal, adding that it likely impeded candidates' abilities to organise and campaign.

== Results ==
Shortly after the release of early results, which indicated a loss for Alliance Lepep, Jugnauth conceded defeat. Turnout was 79%, the highest since 2010. Alliance du Changement won in a landslide, securing 60 seats and winning 20 of the 21 constituencies, the most lopsided victory since 1995. Alliance Lepep won no constituency seats, with Jugnauth losing in his Quartier Militare and Moka constituency. The Rodrigues People's Organisation secured two seats, winning the Rodrigues constituency. Electoral Commissioner Irfan Rahman announced the appointment of four unsuccessful candidates to parliament through the Best Loser System. Two contestants from Alliance Lepep were selected, securing parliamentary representation for the bloc. The other two appointees were members of the Rodrigues-based Alliance Liberation.

Party or alliance		Votes	%	Seats			
Party or alliance		Votes	%	Cons	BL	Total	+/−
Alliance du Changement	Labour Party	847,353	36.16	35	0	35	+23
Alliance du Changement	Mauritian Militant Movement	442,290	18.88	19	0	19	+10
Alliance du Changement	New Democrats	84,960	3.63	3	0	3	New
Alliance du Changement	Rezistans ek Alternativ	63,730	2.72	3	0	3	+3
Alliance du Changement	Total	1,438,333	61.38	60	0	60	New
Alliance Lepep	Militant Socialist Movement	486,065	20.74	0	1	1	−35
Alliance Lepep	Parti Mauricien Social Démocrate	75,243	3.21	0	1	1	−4
Alliance Lepep	Muvman Liberater	35,963	1.53	0	0	0	−3
Alliance Lepep	Muvman Patriot Morisien	29,631	1.26	0	0	0	New
Alliance Lepep	Plateforme Militante	12,470	0.53	0	0	0	−1
Alliance Lepep	Total	639,372	27.29	0	2	2	−42
Linion Reform	Reform Party	60,773	2.59	0	0	0	0
Linion Reform	Linion Moris	56,131	2.40	0	0	0	New
Linion Reform	Total	116,904	4.99	0	0	0	New
Mouvman Bruneau Laurette		34,431	1.47	0	0	0	New
Rodrigues People's Organisation		22,416	0.96	2	0	2	0
Alliance Liberation		20,540	0.88	0	2	2	New
Mauritian Solidarity Front		8,870	0.38	0	0	0	0
Mouvman Enn Sel Direction		2,978	0.13	0	0	0	0
Parti Malin		2,224	0.09	0	0	0	0
Rasanbleman Pou Lavansman Moris		1,935	0.08	0	0	0	New
Idéal Démocrate		1,115	0.05	0	0	0	New
Lalit		773	0.03	0	0	0	0
Rodrigues Movement		733	0.03	0	0	0	0
Nouveau Front Politik		719	0.03	0	0	0	New
Parti Rodriguais Travailleur Democrate		468	0.02	0	0	0	New
Mouvement Zeness Vacoas Phoenix		423	0.02	0	0	0	New
Muvman Independantis Rodriguais		396	0.02	0	0	0	0
Ene Nouvo Espwar		271	0.01	0	0	0	New
Mouvman Verite & Zistis		264	0.01	0	0	0	New
Rassemblement Socialiste Mauricien		259	0.01	0	0	0	0
Parti Liberale Unioniste Rodriguais		257	0.01	0	0	0	New
Mouvement Authentique Mauricien		241	0.01	0	0	0	0
Movement Democratic Mauricien		236	0.01	0	0	0	New
NEXTGen		187	0.01	0	0	0	New
Parti République		186	0.01	0	0	0	New
Les Incorruptibles		115	0.00	0	0	0	New
Citizen's Power		69	0.00	0	0	0	New
Mouvement Méritocrate		59	0.00	0	0	0	New
Parti Pli Rusé		40	0.00	0	0	0	New
Independents		48,431	2.07	0	0	0	0
Total		2,343,245	100.00	62	4	66	−4
Valid votes		787,971	99.10				
Invalid/blank votes		7,187	0.90				
Total votes		795,158	100.00				
Registered voters/turnout		1,002,857	79.29				
Source: OEC, OEC, Le Mauricien

=== By constituency ===
Constituency		MP	Party	Notes
1	Grand River North West– Port Louis West	Fabrice David	PTr	Reelected
1	Grand River North West– Port Louis West	Arianne Navarre-Marie	MMM	Reelected
1	Grand River North West– Port Louis West	Kugan Parapen	ReA	Elected
2	Port Louis South– Port Louis Central	Osman Mahomed	PTr	Reelected
2	Port Louis South– Port Louis Central	Reza Uteem	MMM	Reelected
2	Port Louis South– Port Louis Central	Ismaël Aumeer	PTr	Reelected
3	Port Louis Maritime– Port Louis East	Ehsan Juman	PTr	Reelected
3	Port Louis Maritime– Port Louis East	Shakeel Mohamed	PTr	Reelected
3	Port Louis Maritime– Port Louis East	Aadil Ameer Meea	MMM	Reelected
4	Port Louis North– Montagne Longue	Anabelle Savabaddy	PTr	Elected
4	Port Louis North– Montagne Longue	Ashok Subron	ReA	Elected
4	Port Louis North– Montagne Longue	Ludovic Caserne	MMM	Elected
4	Port Louis North– Montagne Longue	Adrien Duval	PMSD	Best Loser
4	Port Louis North– Montagne Longue	Joe Lesjongard	MSM	Best Loser; Reelected
5	Pamplemousses–Triolet	Navin Ramgoolam	PTr	Elected
5	Pamplemousses–Triolet	Ranjiv Woochit	PTr	Reelected
5	Pamplemousses–Triolet	Kaviraj Rookny	PTr	Elected
6	Grand Baie–Poudre D'Or	Mahend Gungapersad	PTr	Reelected
6	Grand Baie–Poudre D'Or	Nitish Beejan	PTr	Elected
6	Grand Baie–Poudre D'Or	Ram Etwareea	MMM	Elected
7	Piton–Riviere du Rempart	Sandeep Prayag	PTr	Elected
7	Piton–Riviere du Rempart	Raj Pentiah	PTr	Elected
7	Piton–Riviere du Rempart	Kaviraj Sukon	PTr	Elected
8	Quartier Militaire–Moka	Dhaneshwar Damry	PTr	Elected
8	Quartier Militaire–Moka	Babita Thanoo	ReA	Elected
8	Quartier Militaire–Moka	Govinden Venkatasami	MMM	Elected
9	Flacq–Bon Accueil	Anil Bachoo	PTr	Elected
9	Flacq–Bon Accueil	Raviraj Beechook	PTr	Elected
9	Flacq–Bon Accueil	Chandaprakash Ramkalawon	PTr	Elected
10	Montagne Blanche– Grand River South East	Chetan Baboolall	MMM	Elected
10	Montagne Blanche– Grand River South East	Avinash Ramtohul	PTr	Elected
10	Montagne Blanche– Grand River South East	Reza Saumtally	PTr	Elected
11	Vieux Grand Port–Rose Belle	Anishta Babooram	PTr	Elected
11	Vieux Grand Port–Rose Belle	Manoj Seeburn	PTr	Elected
11	Vieux Grand Port–Rose Belle	Ashley Ramdass	PTr	Elected
12	Mahebourg–Plaine Magnien	Ritish Ramful	PTr	Reelected
12	Mahebourg–Plaine Magnien	Tony Apollon	MMM	Elected
12	Mahebourg–Plaine Magnien	Kevin Lukeeram	PTr	Elected
13	Riviere des Anguilles–Souillac	Rajen Narsinghen	PTr	Elected
13	Riviere des Anguilles–Souillac	Roshan Jhummun	PTr	Elected
13	Riviere des Anguilles–Souillac	Rubna Daureeawo	PTr	Elected
14	Savanne–Black River	Arvin Babajee	PTr	Elected
14	Savanne–Black River	Ravin Jagarnath	MMM	Elected
14	Savanne–Black River	Véronique Leu-Govind	ND	Elected
15	La Caverne–Phoenix	Khushal Lobine	ND	Reelected
15	La Caverne–Phoenix	Patrick Assirvaden	PTr	Reelected
15	La Caverne–Phoenix	Fawzi Allymun	MMM	Elected
16	Vacoas–Floreal	Joanna Bérenger	MMM	Reelected
16	Vacoas–Floreal	Jyoti Jeetun	MMM	Elected
16	Vacoas–Floreal	Mahendra Gondeea	PTr	Elected
17	Curepipe–Midlands	Michael Sik Yuen	PTr	Reelected
17	Curepipe–Midlands	Richard Duval	ND	Reelected
17	Curepipe–Midlands	Ajay Gunness	MMM	Elected
18	Belle Rose–Quatre Bornes	Arvin Boolell	PTr	Reelected
18	Belle Rose–Quatre Bornes	Stéphanie Anquetil	PTr	Reelected
18	Belle Rose–Quatre Bornes	Veda Baloomoody	MMM	Elected
19	Stanley–Rose Hill	Paul Bérenger	MMM	Reelected
19	Stanley–Rose Hill	Deven Nagalingum	MMM	Reelected
19	Stanley–Rose Hill	Sydney Pierre	PTr	Elected
20	Beau Bassin–Petite Riviere	Rajesh Bhagwan	MMM	Reelected
20	Beau Bassin–Petite Riviere	Karen Foo Kune	MMM	Reelected
20	Beau Bassin–Petite Riviere	Franco Quirin	MMM	Reelected
21	Rodrigues	Marie Roxana Collet	OPR	Elected
21	Rodrigues	Francisco François	OPR	Reelected
21	Rodrigues	Dianette Henriette-Manan	AL	Best Loser
21	Rodrigues	Jacques Édouard	AL	Best Loser
Source: Electoral Commission

== Aftermath ==
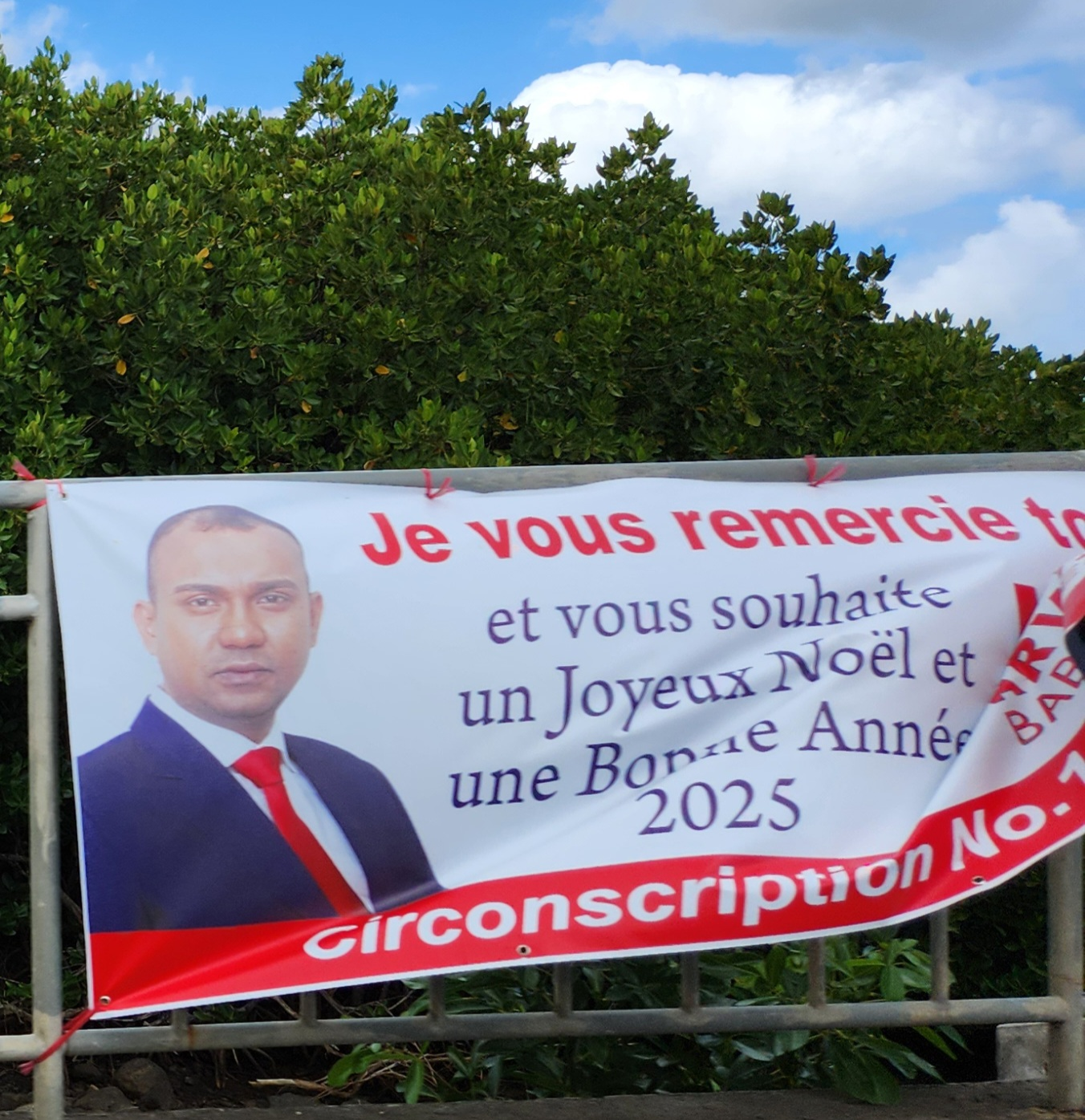
A post-election banner in Bel Ombre by the Labour Party thanking voters

Referring to the election result, Navin Ramgoolam said: "The power of the people is stronger than a dictatorship." He was congratulated by Indian Prime Minister Narendra Modi. President Prithvirajsing Roopun formally appointed Ramgoolam as prime minister on 12 November, shortly after Jugnauth resigned, and was sworn in the following day. Ramgoolam announced that his first act after returning to the premiership was to disassemble Mauritius' "spying system". On 14 November, Alliance Liberation declared its support for the government. The following day, Joe Lesjongard of Alliance Lepep became leader of the opposition. Ramgoolam's cabinet was sworn in at the State House on 22 November. The prime minister assumed several portfolios, including finance, home affairs, defence and external communication. Paul Bérenger was appointed deputy prime minister. The first session of the Eighth National Assembly commenced on 29 November. That day, parliament unanimously elected former Attorney-General Shirin Aumeeruddy-Cziffra as speaker.

Observers, including Professor Roukaya Kasenally of the University of Mauritius, attributed Alliance Lepep's landslide loss to political fatigue, owing to the Jugnauth government's decade-long tenure. Kasenally stated that other factors contributing to the defeat included the government's controversial responses to the wire-tapping revelations and the 2020 oil spill, crime, the cost of living and a decline in public confidence in government institutions. The lopsided result raised concerns about the lack of an opposition presence to hold the new government accountable. The Linion Moris party believed that extra-parliamentary parties would need to assume a more prominent role in providing checks and balances. The party, however, called on Alliance du Changement to carry out constitutional changes that increase transparency.
