= Babita (disambiguation) =

Babita (born 1947) is an Indian actress.

Babita may also refer to:

- Farida Akhtar Babita (born 1953), Bangladeshi actress
- Babita Deokaran, South African murder victim
- Babita Iyer, fictional character in the Indian sitcom Taarak Mehta Ka Ooltah Chashmah
- Babita Kumari (born 1989), Indian wrestler
- Babita Mandlik (born 1981), Indian cricketer
- Babita Pohoomull (born 1981), Indian actress
- Babita Sharma (born 1977), British television newsreader
- Babita Thanoo, Mauritian politician
