= Kaviraj Rookny =

Mauritian politician

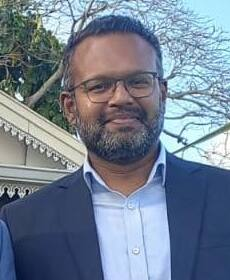
- Kaviraj Rookny in 2025

MP for Pamplemousses–Triolet
- Incumbent
- Assumed office 2024

Personal details
- Party: Labour

Kaviraj (Kavi) Rookny is a Mauritian politician from the Labour Party. He was elected a member of the National Assembly of Mauritius in 2024.
