= Kevin Lukeeram =

Mauritian politician

MP for Mahébourg–Plaine Magnien
- Incumbent
- Assumed office 29 November 2024

Personal details
- Party: Labour

Chitraduthsing (Kevin) Lukeeram is a Mauritian politician from the Labour Party. He was elected a member of the National Assembly of Mauritius in 2024.
