= Arvin Babajee =

Mauritian politician

MP for Savanne–Black River
- Incumbent
- Assumed office 29 November 2024

Personal details
- Party: Labour

Balkrishna Arvin Babajee is a Mauritian politician from the Labour Party. He was elected a member of the National Assembly of Mauritius in 2024. He is a lawyer and former lecturer.
