= Rubna Daureeawo =

Mauritian politician

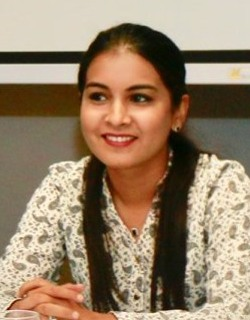
- Rubna Daureeawo in 2019

MP for Rivière des Anguilles–Souillac
- Incumbent
- Assumed office 29 November 2024

Personal details
- Party: Labour

Rubna Begum Daureeawo is a Mauritian politician from the Labour Party. She was elected a member of the National Assembly of Mauritius in 2024. Her father is Senior Counsel Rashad Daureeawo. She is President of United Nations Association of Mauritius.
