= Roshan Jhummun =

Mauritian politician

Ismaël Aumeer

MP for Rivière des Anguilles–Souillac
- Incumbent
- Assumed office 29 November 2024

Personal details
- Party: Labour

Roshan Jhummun is a Mauritian politician from the Labour Party. He was elected a member of the National Assembly of Mauritius in 2024.
