= Reza Saumtally =

Mauritian politician

MP for Montagne Blanche–Grand River South East
- Incumbent
- Assumed office 29 November 2024

Personal details
- Party: Labour
- Website: rezasaumtally.com

Mohamed Reza Saumtally is a Mauritian politician from the Labour Party. He was elected a member of the National Assembly of Mauritius in 2024.
