= Nitish Beejan =

Mauritian politician

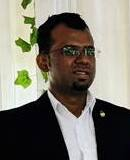
- Nitish Beejan in 2025

MP for Grand Baie–Poudre D'Or
- Incumbent
- Assumed office 2024

Personal details
- Party: Labour

Nitish Sharma Beejan is a Mauritian politician from the Labour Party. He was elected a member of the National Assembly of Mauritius in 2024.
