= Ashok Subron =

Minister of Social Integration, Social Security & National Solidarity

The Honourable Ashok Subron
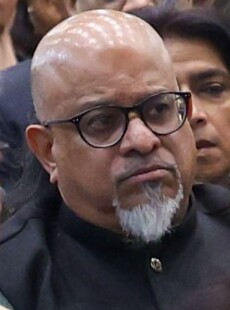
- Subron in 2025.

Minister of Social Integration, Social Security and National Solidarity
- Incumbent
- Assumed office 22 November 2024
- Prime Minister: Navin Ramgoolam
- Preceded by: Fazila Jeewa-Daureeawoo

Member of Parliament; for Port Louis North and Montagne Longue
- Incumbent
- Assumed office 12 November 2024
- Preceded by: Subhasnee

Personal details
- Born: 13 November 1963 (age 62) Mauritius
- Party: Rezistans ek Alternativ
- Website: https://www.papiyon.org/

Ashok Kumar Subron (born 13 November 1963) is a Mauritian trade unionist turned politician and Founder member of Rezistans ek Alternativ together with Veena Dholah, Devianand Narrain, Michel Chiffonne, Ian Jacob, Roody Muneean, Jean Francois Chevathyan, Georges Legallant, Dany Marie, Denis Marchand among others

== Early life ==
Upon his birth at the Moka Hospital on 13 November 1963, Ashok Subron was registered by 2 female hospital workers who jointly brought him up at their respective homes. He studied at the Montagne-Ory Primary School, and then attended St Andrews Secondary School. His interest in politics started during the 1975 Mauritian student protests and he supported Dev Virahsawmy's MMMSP.

== Activist, trade-unionist and politician ==
After his secondary education, activist Rex Stephen influenced Subron's political views as the latter joined Lindsey Collen's and Ram Seegobin's political party Lalit in 1982. Subron was a candidate of Lalit at the General Elections held in 1983, 1987, 1995, and 2000 but was not elected. Subron also formed part of the musical group Fangourin. In 2004 Subron left Lalit and then formed Rezistans ek Alternativ. He also became actively involved with the General Workers Federation (GWF).

Ashok Subron organised a number of strikes, starting from 1992 with a strike by construction workers. In 2010 he organised a strike by workers in the sugar industry, followed by another strike in 2011 by workers of the Cargo Handling Corporation Ltd (CHCL). In 2014, in cahoots with Imzad Beeharry, he masterminded a strike by transportation workers represented by the Union of Bus Industry Workers (UBIW).

Trade unionist and former MMM MP Jack Bizlall publicly criticised Subron on 1 May 2018 for abandoning the group of trade unions called Collectif Premye Me, and Bizlall reminded the audience that unlike other trade unionists he has never been paid to fight for workers' rights.

In 2020 Subron was a negotiator of Airports of Mauritius Ltd Employees Union (AMLEU) and spokesperson of the GWF who called upon the government to take action against the harassment and suspension of AMLEU president Sharvin Sunassee. Subron also acted as the negotiator of the UBIW in 2022 when the workers sought a 25% pay rise.

== 2024 elections and integration with Alliance du Changement ==
On Wednesday, 9 October 2024, Ashok Subron announced his candidacy in Constituency No. 4 (Port-Louis Nord/Montagne-Longue) at the 2024 Mauritian general election, as part of the Alliance du Changement coalition and on 10 November 2024 he was elected. On 22 November 2024 he was sworn in as Minister of Social Integration, Social Security & National Solidarity by President Roopun in Navin Ramgoolam's new cabinet. Subron's wife Dany Marie and grandson also attended the swearing-in ceremony which was held at the State House located at Le Réduit. Kugan Parapen, also from Subron's party REA, was sworn in as Junior Minister of Social Integration, Social Security and National Solidarity.

== 2025 NEF Recruitment Scandal ==
On 21 May 2025 a scandal involving Subron broke out when the local press reported that he had nominated his wife Dany Marie to the board of interviewers of the National Empowerment Foundation (NEF). Mohammad Belall Maudarbux, whose application for a position with the NEF was unsuccessful, complained about Subron's shocking nomination of his own partner Dany Marie, as well as the appointment of journalists Hootesh Ramburn and Axcel Chenney, in a letter that he wrote to the Prime Minister on 19 May 2025. Maudarbux decried the lack of transparency and blatant conflict of interest, given that all interviews and recruitment decisions at the NEF were being made by two individuals only, that is, Subron's wife Dany Marie and Kugan Parapen, a Junior Minister.
