= Anabelle Savabaddy =

Mauritian politician

MP for Port Louis North–Montagne Longue
- Incumbent
- Assumed office 29 November 2024

Personal details
- Party: Labour

Marie Anabelle Andelana Savabaddy is a Mauritian politician from the Labour Party. She was elected a member of the National Assembly of Mauritius in 2024.
