= Sandeep Prayag =

Mauritian politician

MP for Piton–Rivière du Rempart
- Incumbent
- Assumed office 2024

Personal details
- Party: Labour

Sandeep (Nitin) Prayag is a Mauritian politician from the Labour Party. He was elected a member of the National Assembly of Mauritius in 2024.
