= Farhad Aumeer =

Mauritian politician

Ismaël Aumeer

MP for Port Louis South–Port Louis Central
- Incumbent
- Assumed office November 2019

Personal details
- Party: Labour

Farhad Ismaël Aumeer is a Mauritian politician from the Labour Party. He was elected a member of the National Assembly of Mauritius in 2019 and re-elected in 2024.
