= Ludovic Caserne =

Mauritian politician

MP for Port Louis North–Montagne Longue
- Incumbent
- Assumed office 29 November 2024

Personal details
- Party: Mauritian Militant Movement

Louis Ludovic Michel Caserne is a Mauritian politician from the Mauritian Militant Movement (MMM). He was elected a member of the National Assembly of Mauritius in 2024. Caserne was previously a municipal advisor specialising in maritime export and supply chain management.
