= Ram Etwareea =

Mauritian politician

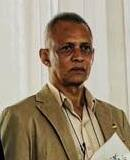
- Ram Etwareea in 2025

MP for Grand Baie–Poudre D'Or
- Incumbent
- Assumed office 29 November 2024

Personal details
- Party: Mauritian Militant Movement

Rameshwar (Ram) Etwareea is a Mauritian politician from the Mauritian Militant Movement (MMM). He was elected a member of the National Assembly of Mauritius in 2024. Etwareea previously worked as a journalist for 30 years.
