= Stéphanie Anquetil =

Mauritian politician

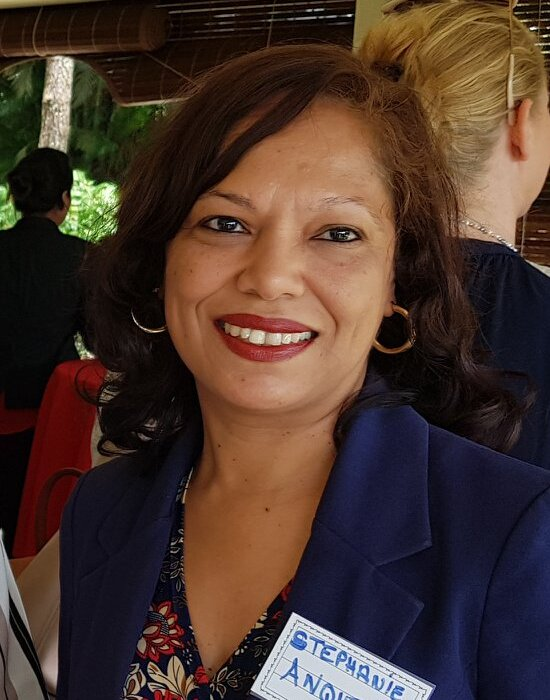
- Stéphanie Anquetil in 2020

MP for Belle Rose–Quatre Bornes
- Incumbent
- Assumed office 2019

MP for Vacoas–Floréal
- In office 2010–2014

Personal details
- Party: Labour Party

Marie Genevieve Stéphanie Anquetil is a Mauritian politician from the Labour Party. She is a member of the National Assembly of Mauritius.
