= Govinden Venkatasami =

Mauritian politician

MP for Quartier Militaire–Moka
- Incumbent
- Assumed office 29 November 2024

Personal details
- Party: Mauritian Militant Movement

Pynivel (Govinden) Venkatasami is a Mauritian politician from the Mauritian Militant Movement (MMM). He was elected a member of the National Assembly of Mauritius in 2024.
