= Ehsan Juman =

Mauritian politician

Mohamed Ehsan Juman, also known as Ehsan Juman, is a Mauritian politician.

== Political career ==
Ehsan Juman started his career as a councillor of the Municipality of Port Louis as a member of the Labour Party (Mauritius) until his resignation in 2012 to join the MSM.

At the 2019 Mauritian general election Ehsan Juman was a candidate of the Labour Party (Mauritius) within L'Alliance Nationale in Constituency No.3 (Port Louis Maritime and Port Louis East) but he was not elected. However, the Electoral Commission nominated him as one of the 8 Best Losers.

Eshan Juman, contested the 2024 general elections under the banner of the Alliance for Change, a coalition led by Navin Ramgoolam. The elections were marked by a historic landslide victory for the opposition, which won 60 out of 62 elected seats in the National Assembly. While specific results for Eshan Joomun’s constituency are not yet prominently detailed, the coalition’s overwhelming success reflects widespread public support for its candidates amidst calls for change in governance and economic management.

== Business interests ==
In addition to his involvement in politics Ehsan Juman also operates a number of businesses including E-Juman Group (managing director), Sunday Times (newspaper), Notre-Dame Steel Ltd, Chantier de Notre Dame Ltd, and Notre-Dame Properties Ltd in Mauritius. He is a shareholder in 4 companies, namely 1000 shares in Chantier de Notre-Dame Ltée, 100 shares of Assabah News Ltd, 900 shares in Notre-Dame Steel Co Ltd and 1000 shares in Notre-Dame Property Ltd. In 2020 Juman publicly disclosed his ownership of 18 properties, one of which was located at Trianon, another one in Mare-Sèche, and 16 of which were located in the village of Notre-Dame.

== Corruption and bribery ==
In 2007 Eshan Juman attempted to bribe Police Constable Juwaheer when he was caught using his mobile phone whilst driving, and he had also refused to provide his driver's licence. During his court appearance Eshan Juman claimed to be only a truck driver, although he was the deputy Lord Mayor. Mahmade Kodabaccus, the PMSD Lord Mayor, responded to Joomun in 2012 that "you are disqualified to talk about corruption, because you yourself symbolises corruption here" after Joomun had accused the Lord Mayor of dining with, and then awarding a contract to a particular supplier of curtains. In November 2016 Eshan Juman was found guilty of "bribery of public official". Despite an appeal against his sentence, Juman was sentenced to 1 month in jail.
