= Navin Ramgoolam =

Prime Minister of Mauritius (1995–2000; 2005–2014; since 2024)

The Honourable Navin Ramgoolam GCSK FRCP
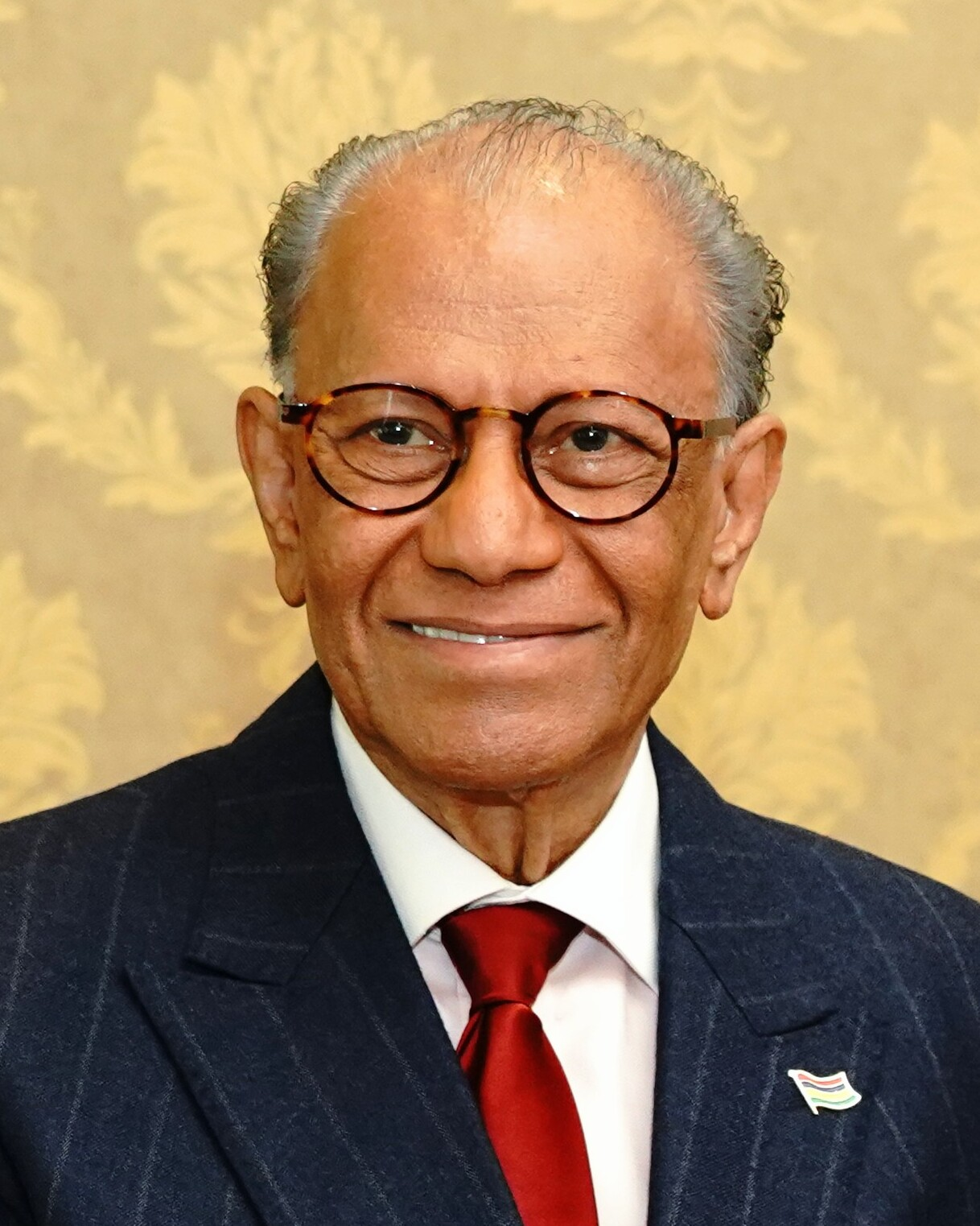
- Ramgoolam in 2025

Prime Minister of Mauritius
- Incumbent
- Assumed office 13 November 2024
- President: Prithvirajsing Roopun; Dharam Gokhool
- Deputy: Paul Bérenger (2024–2026); Arianne Navarre-Marie (since 2026)
- Preceded by: Pravind Jugnauth
- In office 5 July 2005 – December 2014
- President: Anerood Jugnauth; Kailash Purryag
- Deputy: Rashid Beebeejaun
- Preceded by: Paul Bérenger
- Succeeded by: Anerood Jugnauth
- In office 27 December 1995 – September 2000
- President: Cassam Uteem
- Deputy: Paul Bérenger (1995–1997)
- Preceded by: Anerood Jugnauth
- Succeeded by: Anerood Jugnauth

Minister of Finance
- Incumbent
- Assumed office 22 November 2024
- Preceded by: Renganaden Padayachy

Leader of the Opposition
- In office October 2000 – July 2005
- In office September 1991 – December 1995

Leader of the Labour Party
- Incumbent
- Assumed office 24 February 1991
- Preceded by: Satcam Boolell

Personal details
- Born: Navinchandra Ramgoolam; 14 July 1947 (age 79) Port Louis, British Mauritius
- Party: Labour Party
- Other political affiliations: Alliance du Changement (since 2024)
- Spouse: Veena Brizmohun (m. 1979)
- Children: Xara Keiron Chandra Soornack (born 2009)
- Parents: Seewoosagur Ramgoolam; Sushil Ramgoolam
- Education: Royal College Curepipe; Royal College of Surgeons in Ireland; London School of Economics (LLB); Inns of Court School of Law
- Profession: Physician, barrister, politician

Navinchandra Ramgoolam (born 14 July 1947) is a Mauritian politician, physician and barrister who has been Prime Minister of Mauritius since November 2024, an office he previously held from 1995 to 2000 and from 2005 to 2014. He has led the Labour Party since 1991 and has also been Minister of Finance since 2024. The son of Seewoosagur Ramgoolam, who led Mauritius to independence in 1968 and was its first prime minister, he trained as a doctor in Dublin and worked in hospitals in Ireland, England and Mauritius before reading law at the London School of Economics and being called to the bar in 1993.

Ramgoolam became Labour's leader and Leader of the Opposition in 1991. In alliance with Paul Bérenger's Mauritian Militant Movement (MMM), Labour won every seat on the island of Mauritius at the 1995 general election. His first government replaced the sales tax with value-added tax, legislated against domestic violence and for a national human rights commission, provided for private broadcasting and hosted the launch of the Indian Ocean Rim Association, while the economy grew by an average of more than five per cent a year. The coalition with the MMM ended in 1997, the riots that followed the death in police custody of the singer Kaya tested the government in 1999, and Labour was heavily defeated by an alliance of the Militant Socialist Movement (MSM) and the MMM in 2000.

Returning to power in 2005 at the head of the Alliance Sociale, Ramgoolam governed through the loss of preferential access for Mauritian textiles and sugar. His finance minister, Rama Sithanen, replaced a complex tax system with a flat rate of 15 per cent, abolished most investment-incentive schemes, opened the economy to foreign investors and skilled workers and restructured the sugar industry, reforms that the International Monetary Fund (IMF) commended. Real growth averaged about 4.3 per cent a year from 2006 to 2014, gross domestic product (GDP) per head nearly doubled in US dollar terms, and Mauritius was ranked first in Africa for governance and for the ease of doing business. The second premiership also brought free bus travel for students and pensioners, the Truth and Justice Commission on slavery and indenture, the inscription of Aapravasi Ghat and Le Morne on the World Heritage List and the arbitration in which Mauritius successfully challenged the British marine protected area around the Chagos Archipelago. Re-elected in 2010, he lost the 2014 election, and his own seat, after proposing a "Second Republic" with a directly elected president.

During ten years in opposition, provisional charges brought against him in 2015 were struck out, and in 2024 he led the Alliance du Changement to a 60–0 victory on the island of Mauritius. His third government published an audit of the public finances, held municipal elections for the first time in a decade, set up a constitutional review commission, began reforming the electoral system, overhauled the state pension and made Mauritius the first African country to adhere to the IMF's highest data-dissemination standard. The economy grew by 3.5 per cent in 2025, a year of record tourist arrivals and foreign investment, before slowing in 2026 as conflict in the Middle East raised energy prices. Ramgoolam signed the 2025 treaty by which the United Kingdom recognises Mauritian sovereignty over the Chagos Archipelago, raised relations with India to an "Enhanced Strategic Partnership" and received the first visit by a French president in three decades. In 2026 Bérenger resigned as deputy prime minister, and in October riots set off by a police shooting led the government to impose a curfew.

== Early life and education ==
Ramgoolam was born in Port Louis on 14 July 1947, the son of Seewoosagur Ramgoolam and his wife, Sushil. His father, the leader of the Labour Party and of the movement for independence, was prime minister from independence in 1968 until 1982. Navin Ramgoolam was educated at the Royal College Curepipe from 1960 to 1968 and went on to study medicine at the Royal College of Surgeons in Ireland in Dublin, where he qualified in 1975 with the licentiates of the Royal Colleges of Physicians and of Surgeons in Ireland. After internships at St Laurence's Hospital in Dublin and at Monaghan County Hospital, he was a resident medical officer at Dr A. G. Jeetoo Hospital in Port Louis in 1976–77. He then spent most of the following decade in England: he was a clinical assistant in cardiology at University College Hospital, London, from 1977 to 1981, held locum and house-officer posts, and was resident medical officer at the Yorkshire Clinic in Bingley from 1982 to 1985, before practising as a general practitioner in Mauritius from 1985 to 1987.

His mother died on 5 January 1984, and it was at his father's death in December 1985 that Navin Ramgoolam began to appear in public life. According to Agence France-Presse, the Labour Party sought him out in order to capitalise on his father's name; he has said that he entered politics par accident ("by accident"). In 1987 he returned to London to read law at the London School of Economics, graduating with an LLB (Hons) in 1990. He took the bar vocational course at the Inns of Court School of Law in 1992–93, was called to the bar by the Inner Temple in 1993 and practised briefly at Thomas More Chambers in London in 1994, by which time he was already Leader of the Opposition in Mauritius.

== Rise to the Labour leadership (1990–1995) ==
Ramgoolam made his political debut in 1990 at the head of the campaign against the bill by which the government of Anerood Jugnauth, an alliance of the MSM and the MMM, sought to make Mauritius a republic; the government fell one vote short of the three-quarters majority needed to amend the constitution. On 24 February 1991 Satcam Boolell handed him the leadership of the Labour Party. At the general election of 15 September 1991, at which the opposition alliance of Labour and the Parti Mauricien Social Démocrate (PMSD) won only three seats, he was elected for Constituency No. 5 (Pamplemousses–Triolet), one of three Labour members returned, and became Leader of the Opposition. He continued his legal studies in London, and in January 1993 the government majority tried to have his seat declared vacant because of his absences; the Supreme Court described the manoeuvre as a "colourable device", and he kept his seat. After the MSM–MMM coalition broke up in 1993, Ramgoolam and Bérenger formed the Labour–MMM alliance with which they contested the next election.

== First premiership (1995–2000) ==
=== Election and government ===
At the general election of 20 December 1995 the Labour–MMM alliance took 65.2 per cent of the vote and all 60 seats on the island of Mauritius; the two seats for Rodrigues went to the Rodrigues People's Organisation. Ramgoolam headed the poll in Constituency No. 5 with 27,233 votes. He was sworn in as prime minister on 27 December 1995 and named his cabinet three days later, with Bérenger as deputy prime minister and minister of foreign affairs. The alliance had promised to continue the market-oriented economic policies of its predecessors while giving higher priority to social welfare.

=== Economy and reforms ===
Rundheersing Bheenick, the government's first finance minister, held the post until August 1996 and later became minister of economic development; Vasant Bunwaree was finance minister by 1997. The government's main fiscal reform was the replacement of the sales tax by a value-added tax, levied at 10 per cent from 7 September 1998. The economy grew by between 5.6 and 6.1 per cent a year from 1996 to 1998, driven, according to the IMF, by the manufactures of the export processing zone, sugar exports and tourism, while the budget deficit narrowed from 6¼ per cent of GDP in 1995–96 to about 3⅔ per cent in 1997–98. A severe drought and a cyclone cut growth to 2.6 per cent in 1999 before it rebounded to 8.2 per cent in 2000, and consumer-price inflation stayed between about 4 and 7 per cent a year throughout the term. Tourist arrivals rose from 437,000 in 1995 to 678,000 in 2000, but unemployment, by the government's own figures, increased from 5.1 per cent in 1995 to 8.0 per cent in 2000.

The government also legislated on social and institutional questions. The Protection from Domestic Violence Act, partly in force in 1997 and fully in 1998, made domestic violence a criminal offence, and the Protection of Human Rights Act 1998 provided for a National Human Rights Commission; the act took effect in 1999, although the commission had not yet been constituted by the end of 2000. In December 1998 the roughly 300 inhabitants of Agaléga were given the right to vote in general elections, and in August 2000 the National Assembly passed the Independent Broadcasting Authority Act, which provided for privately owned radio and television stations and so prepared the end of the state broadcaster's monopoly.

=== Foreign policy ===
In foreign policy Ramgoolam promoted regional cooperation. In March 1997 representatives of fourteen countries meeting in Mauritius adopted the charter of the Indian Ocean Rim Association for Regional Cooperation, later the Indian Ocean Rim Association; Ramgoolam described the charter as "a modest and flexible framework for cooperation". Mauritius chaired the association's council of ministers until 1999 and in 1998 became the seat of its coordinating secretariat. In September 1998 Ramgoolam hosted at Grand Baie the summit of the Southern African Development Community (SADC), chaired by Nelson Mandela, at which the Democratic Republic of the Congo and Seychelles were admitted as members; he told the summit that Mauritius felt "particularly privileged" to host it.

=== End of the coalition and the 1999 riots ===
The coalition with the MMM did not last. On 20 June 1997 President Cassam Uteem, acting on Ramgoolam's advice, revoked Bérenger's appointment; the other MMM ministers resigned and Bérenger became Leader of the Opposition. The historian Jocelyn Chan Low later attributed the break to the contrast between Ramgoolam's slow decision-making and Bérenger's wish to move quickly, and to the MMM's criticism of the government's record on law and order. Labour governed alone for the rest of the term, and in April 1998 its candidate, Satish Faugoo, won a by-election in Constituency No. 9 ahead of Anerood Jugnauth.

In February 1999 the seggae singer Kaya was arrested after a concert held in support of the decriminalisation of cannabis, and on 21 February he was found dead in his police cell. His death set off several days of rioting, during which the police shot dead three people, among them the singer Berger Agathe, and damage was estimated at about US$50 million. Ramgoolam was criticised for waiting three days before appealing publicly for calm. He then addressed the nation and appointed a commission of inquiry into the riots, chaired by a judge, alongside a judicial inquiry into Kaya's death. The commission's report, released in October 2000, criticised the outgoing government and the police for their handling of the riots; Ramgoolam later obtained from the Supreme Court the correction of passages that concerned him.

=== 2000 election ===
In August 2000, about four months before the end of the parliamentary term, the National Assembly was dissolved on Ramgoolam's advice; the dissolution followed the resignation of two ministers who had been prosecuted by the economic crime office. The MSM and the MMM, reunited under an agreement by which Jugnauth was to hand the premiership to Bérenger during the term, won 54 of the 60 seats on the island of Mauritius at the election of 11 September 2000, taking 51.7 per cent of the vote against 36.6 per cent for Labour and its ally, the Mauritian Party of Xavier-Luc Duval. Ramgoolam held his seat and again became Leader of the Opposition.

== Leader of the Opposition (2000–2005) ==
As Leader of the Opposition from October 2000 to July 2005, Ramgoolam built a broad coalition, the Alliance Sociale, around Labour and the PMSD. Its 2005 campaign attacked corruption and drug trafficking and promised "economic democratization", the automatic payment of the old-age pension to everyone over 60 and free transport for students. At the election of 3 July 2005 the Alliance Sociale won 38 elected seats against 22 for the MSM–MMM, with about 49 per cent of the vote against 43 per cent; Pravind Jugnauth lost his seat, and Bérenger, the outgoing prime minister, conceded defeat. Ramgoolam was sworn in as prime minister for the second time on 5 July 2005, with Rashid Beebeejaun as deputy prime minister.

== Second premiership (2005–2014) ==
Ramgoolam with the British foreign secretary, William Hague, in 2010

=== Economic reform programme ===
Ramgoolam's second government took office as Mauritius faced three external shocks, which Sithanen likened to "three very strong cyclones" striking at once: the end of textile quotas under the Multi Fibre Arrangement on 1 January 2005, the European Union's decision to cut the guaranteed price of sugar by 36 per cent, and the rise in oil prices. Sithanen's first full budget, presented in June 2006 under the title Securing the Transition: From Trade Preferences to Global Competition, removed most income-tax exemptions, cut the number of tax bands, reduced personal and corporate rates and announced a single rate of 15 per cent; the 2007–08 budget brought the flat rate of 15 per cent for both individuals and companies forward to 1 July 2007, two years earlier than planned. The 2006 budget also abolished almost all the incentive-certificate schemes that had governed investment, except the Integrated Resort Scheme and the freeport, merged the export processing zone with the rest of the economy, cut customs duties with the aim of making Mauritius a "duty free island", and replaced separate work and residence permits for foreigners with a single occupation permit processed by the Board of Investment within three working days. A Business Facilitation Act passed the same year replaced prior authorisation of many business activities with verification after the event, and the Mauritius Revenue Authority, created by legislation of 2004, became fully operational on 1 July 2006.

To cushion the transition, the government launched an Empowerment Programme of Rs 5 billion over five years to assist the sectors most affected by liberalisation and to support new entrepreneurs and small businesses. Under a Multi-Annual Adaptation Strategy for 2006–2015 submitted to the European Union, the sugar industry was restructured: seven of its eleven factories were to close, leaving production concentrated in four mills, with about €301 million of European support, and the government said that negotiations led by Ramgoolam had raised Mauritius's share of the EU's accompanying funds from 15.5 to 19.4 per cent. An agreement in 2008 reserved a 35 per cent stake in the new sugar-cane ventures for small planters and employees, in line with the government's stated aim of "democratising the economy". Labour law was overhauled by the Employment Rights Act 2008, which came into force in February 2009 and repealed the Labour Act.

International institutions endorsed the programme. The IMF judged in 2007 that the economy was "on the right track, supported by reforms to improve the business environment", and in 2008 that the tax and business-environment reforms had "contributed to reduced fiscal deficits and rising FDI". The World Bank's Doing Business survey cited the move from a tiered to a single tax rate with a broader base, and in its 2010 edition Mauritius rose from 24th to 17th place in the world, the best performance in Africa. The reforms also had critics, who described them as neo-liberal "shock therapy"; some of the new taxes, among them the national residential property tax and the tax on interest income, were abolished, with retroactive effect, in the budget for 2011.

=== Global crisis and economic record ===
When the global financial crisis reached Mauritius, the government unveiled in mid-December 2008 an Additional Stimulus Package of Rs 10.4 billion, about 3.8 per cent of GDP, while the Bank of Mauritius cut its key interest rate by 250 basis points. The package's measures to save jobs and support firms, which the 2009 budget described as "for all practical purposes, a mini-budget", were judged by the IMF to have "helped cushion the economy from the impact of the crisis". Growth slowed to 3.4 per cent in 2009 and recovered to 4.4 per cent in 2010. After the 2010 election the finance portfolio passed to Pravind Jugnauth and, in 2011, to Xavier-Luc Duval; Ramgoolam took it himself in 2014.

Over the second premiership real GDP grew by an average of about 4.3 per cent a year between 2006 and 2014, unemployment fell from 9.5 per cent in 2005 to 7.2 per cent in 2008 and stayed between 7 and 8 per cent thereafter, and GDP per head rose from US$5,354 in 2005 to US$10,490 in 2014. Inflation, which reached 9.7 per cent in 2008 as world food and fuel prices rose, fell to between 2.5 and 6.5 per cent from 2009. Net inflows of foreign direct investment grew from US$42 million in 2005 to a peak of US$589 million in 2012, and the number of tourists passed one million for the first time in 2014, when 1,038,968 visitors arrived. Mauritius ranked first in Africa in every edition of the Ibrahim Index of African Governance from 2007 to 2014 and was the African country ranked highest in the World Bank's Doing Business surveys of the period; by 2012 Moody's had raised its sovereign rating from Baa2 to Baa1, which the government described as the first upgrade in the country's history. Summarising the period, The Statesman's Yearbook noted that by 2008 Ramgoolam "had overseen a reduction in both unemployment and the budget deficit".

=== Social policy, heritage and infrastructure ===
Soon after taking office the government introduced free bus travel for students and pensioners, and in 2008 it confirmed the universal payment of the basic retirement pension from the age of 60, having dropped a plan announced in 2006 to raise the entitlement age to 65. The Equal Opportunities Act 2008 created an Equal Opportunities Commission, which was in operation by 2012; the Local Government Act 2011 reorganised local government; and the budget for 2013 provided a tablet computer for every pupil in Form IV, some 20,000 devices in all. In 2008 Ramgoolam launched Maurice Île Durable ("Mauritius Sustainable Island"), a long-term sustainability project financed by a fund of Rs 1.3 billion that replaced the National Energy Fund.

The period also brought national recognition of the history of slavery and indentured labour. Aapravasi Ghat, the immigration depot in Port Louis through which almost half a million indentured labourers from India entered Mauritius between 1834 and 1920, was inscribed on UNESCO's World Heritage List in July 2006, and the mountain of Le Morne, a refuge of escaped slaves, in July 2008. The Truth and Justice Commission, set up under an act of 2008 and chaired by Alex Boraine, examined the consequences of slavery and indenture and published its report in 2011; later budgets cited its recommendations when creating a national heritage company.

Large infrastructure projects of these years included a new terminal at Sir Seewoosagur Ramgoolam International Airport, built and operated under a contract with Aéroports de Paris; the Bagatelle Dam, a Rs 3 billion project financed by China; the first phase of a ring road around Port Louis; and the Terre Rouge–Verdun link road. The government promoted information technology and business-process outsourcing, whose weight in the economy was rising fast, and set up an "Ebene Accelerator" in 2013; in 2009 it inaugurated the Jin Fei economic zone, a Chinese investment of Rs 25 billion over eight years that it called the largest foreign investment in the country's history. To extend Mauritian business into the rest of the continent, the 2014 budget created a Mauritius–Africa Fund of Rs 500 million over five years.

=== Foreign policy and the Chagos Archipelago ===
Ramgoolam and David Cameron signing the agreement on the transfer of suspected pirates, June 2012

Ramgoolam pursued Mauritius's claim to the Chagos Archipelago, which the United Kingdom had detached from the colony in 1965. When the British government declared a marine protected area around the archipelago on 1 April 2010, Mauritius objected, and after WikiLeaks published a US diplomatic cable in December 2010 suggesting that the reserve was intended partly to prevent the islanders' resettlement, Ramgoolam told members of parliament that there was "a Machiavellian agenda behind this project". On 20 December 2010 Mauritius began arbitral proceedings against the United Kingdom under the United Nations Convention on the Law of the Sea; in its award of 18 March 2015 the tribunal held that the United Kingdom had breached its obligations to Mauritius in declaring the protected area. Ramgoolam also sought European support for the sugar transition and cooperation with the United Kingdom against piracy in the Indian Ocean: in June 2012 he signed with the British prime minister, David Cameron, a memorandum of understanding under which Mauritius agreed to accept for prosecution suspected pirates captured by the Royal Navy. In 2008 India gave him its Pravasi Bharatiya Samman, an award for members of the Indian diaspora.

=== 2010 and 2014 elections ===
For the election of 5 May 2010, Labour formed the Alliance de l'Avenir with the MSM, then led by Pravind Jugnauth, and the PMSD. The alliance won 41 elected seats against 18 for the MMM-led alliance, and Ramgoolam formed a new government. The arrangement did not last: on 26 July 2011 the six MSM ministers, including the finance minister, Pravind Jugnauth, resigned after the Independent Commission Against Corruption arrested the health minister in its investigation of the government's purchase of the MedPoint private clinic.

In September 2014 Ramgoolam and Bérenger, reconciled, signed an agreement for the coming election. Labour and the MMM would each field half the candidates; a "Second Republic" bill would create a president elected by direct universal suffrage for seven years, with greater powers, a post for which Ramgoolam would stand while Bérenger became prime minister; and 20 seats would be filled from party lists. At the early election of 10 December 2014 the MSM-led Alliance Lepep, which opposed the plan, won 47 of the 62 elected seats, and Ramgoolam lost the seat he had held for 23 years. He conceded defeat on 11 December, and Anerood Jugnauth was appointed prime minister on 15 December.

== Opposition (2014–2024) ==
=== Arrest and court cases ===
On 6 February 2015, two months after leaving office, Ramgoolam was arrested on provisional charges of conspiracy to pervert the course of justice in connection with the inquiry into a 2011 burglary at his seaside house at Roches-Noires; charges under the anti-money-laundering law were added after the police found large sums of cash at his home, which he said were donations to the Labour Party. He was released on bail the next day. While the cases were pending he handed the day-to-day direction of the party to a collegial leadership, with Arvin Boolell as its spokesman, without giving up the leadership. All eleven provisional charges were eventually struck out. The Roches-Noires case was dismissed in September 2019, when the court upheld a submission of no case to answer, and the Director of Public Prosecutions did not appeal; a prosecution for accepting cash payments above the legal limit, struck out in 2019 and appealed by the prosecution, was stayed as an abuse of process on 8 June 2026.

=== Rebuilding the Labour Party ===
Ramgoolam resisted calls from within Labour, among them from Boolell and Shakeel Mohamed, to step aside. Ahead of the 2015 municipal elections, which the governing Alliance Lepep won 120–0, he urged Labour supporters to vote against the government's candidates. In December 2017 Boolell won a by-election for Labour in Constituency No. 18 (Belle-Rose–Quatre-Bornes). At the 2019 general election Ramgoolam led the Alliance Nationale, formed with the PMSD, and moved to Constituency No. 10 (Montagne Blanche–Grand River South East); the alliance won 17 of the 70 seats in the National Assembly, and he was again defeated. His election petition contesting the result in that constituency was withdrawn in October 2022.

Ramgoolam nonetheless kept his hold on the party. In February 2021 he organised with Bérenger, Xavier-Luc Duval, Roshi Bhadain and the activist Bruneau Laurette a march demanding the resignation of Pravind Jugnauth's government. When the MMM, the PMSD and the Reform Party opposed his candidacy for prime minister in a joint opposition alliance later that year, the Labour Party rallied behind him; L'Express concluded that within the party he remained "the sole master" (le seul maître). A Labour–MMM–PMSD alliance formalised in July 2023 broke up in April 2024 over the allocation of candidacies. In September 2024 Labour, the MMM, the New Democrats, formed by dissidents of the PMSD, and Rezistans ek Alternativ announced the Alliance du Changement, whose four-party agreement was signed on 10 October. Its campaign promised a fund to support families in difficulty, free public transport, higher pensions, lower fuel prices, action against corruption and electoral reform. The final weeks were dominated by the "Missie Moustass" leaks of recorded telephone conversations of politicians and other public figures, which the government answered with a brief suspension of access to social media.

== Third premiership (2024–present) ==
Ramgoolam with the Indian prime minister, Narendra Modi, in Port Louis in March 2025

=== Election and programme ===
At the general election of 10 November 2024 the Alliance du Changement won 62.6 per cent of the vote and 60 of the 62 elected seats, leaving the outgoing government of Pravind Jugnauth without a seat on the island of Mauritius. Le Défi Media wrote that Ramgoolam had overcome a prime minister whom many had considered invincible, and the political scientist Roukaya Kasenally described the result as the third clean sweep in the country's history, after those of 1982 and 1995, driven by political fatigue, scandals, the cost of living and the revelations of telephone tapping. Elected first member for Constituency No. 5, Ramgoolam was sworn in as prime minister on 13 November 2024; he kept the finance portfolio, and Bérenger became deputy prime minister. The government's programme, presented in January 2025, pledged a constitutional review commission within six months, a law on the financing of political parties, an end to the obligation for candidates to declare their community, a law limiting covert surveillance, reform of the Independent Broadcasting Authority and licences for private television, freedom-of-information legislation and the replacement of the Financial Crimes Commission by a national crime agency.

=== Institutional and democratic reforms ===
Several of these commitments were carried out in the government's first two years. Municipal elections, last held in 2015, took place on 4 May 2025 in the five towns, and the Alliance du Changement won 117 of the 120 seats in a vote boycotted by the MSM and its allies. The Constitutional Commission Bill, which Ramgoolam introduced by saying that constitutional reform "cannot and must not be the monopoly of politicians alone", was adopted on 2 June 2026. The commission, chaired by the former chief justice Y. K. J. Yeung Sik Yuen, was asked to examine questions including the election of the president by an electoral college, proportional representation, the representation of women in Parliament, the recall of members and the financing of parties. A national consultation on electoral reform closed in January 2026. Ramgoolam and Bérenger agreed to keep 60 members elected by first-past-the-post voting in the 20 constituencies, to add 20 seats filled by compensatory proportional representation and to abolish the obligation for candidates to declare their community, though they differed over the future of the Best Loser System; a constitutional amendment allowing candidates to stand without a community classification went to the cabinet in April 2026.

The government also changed the framework of policing and prosecution. According to L'Express, the powers of the Director of Public Prosecutions were restored, magistrates were no longer sanctioned for their judgments and several institutions regained a measure of autonomy. A Police (Amendment) Act passed in November 2025 allowed the commissioner of police to call on foreign specialist investigators, and in January 2026 Ramgoolam announced a Police and Criminal Justice Bill to end the system of provisional charges, together with a National Prosecution Commission and a National Crime Agency; under nine bills published in September 2026 the Financial Crimes Commission was to be merged into the new agency. Their tabling was deferred, and Bérenger, by then in opposition, called for a select committee to examine them. The Central Criminal Investigation Division investigated the equipment allegedly used to intercept telephone conversations on a large scale under the previous government, and in December 2025 a senior police officer was arrested in that inquiry. The state broadcaster, the Mauritius Broadcasting Corporation, became more pluralist under a new director-general appointed in February 2025 and restored full coverage of parliamentary sittings, and in October 2025 the National Assembly repealed section 76B of the Criminal Code, introduced in 2021, which had made it an offence to misrepresent Mauritian sovereignty over the Chagos Archipelago.

The government also sought to restore confidence in official statistics. The State of the Economy report, an audit published in December 2024, revised real growth for 2023 from 7.0 to 5.6 per cent and public sector debt at June 2024 from 77.6 to 83.4 per cent of GDP; Ramgoolam said that the previous government had bequeathed a disastrous economy. An IMF review of data standards published in December 2025 found reforms under way and recommended strengthening the professional independence of the head of Statistics Mauritius, and on 16 March 2026 Mauritius became the first African country, and the 32nd in the world, to adhere to the IMF's Special Data Dissemination Standard Plus.

=== Economic and social policy ===
Ramgoolam presented his first budget, From Abyss to Prosperity: Rebuilding the Bridge to the Future, on 5 June 2025. It set out a "New Economic Model" based on innovation, artificial intelligence and investment, about Rs 128 billion of infrastructure spending over five years and a Price Stabilisation Fund of Rs 10 billion for basic goods, and guaranteed full-time workers a minimum monthly income of Rs 20,000. His second, presented on 19 June 2026 under the theme that "Mauritius must be future ready", added Rs 2 billion to the stabilisation fund and introduced a Start-Up Act with a ten-year tax holiday, a top income-tax rate of 35 per cent on income above Rs 12 million, maternity leave of twelve months and paternity leave of six weeks, while leaving value-added tax unchanged. Workers earning up to Rs 50,000 a month received a "14th-month" allowance in December 2024 and January 2025, the national minimum wage rose to Rs 17,745 a month in January 2026, and the 2026 report of the Pay Research Bureau raised public-sector salaries by an average of 15.3 per cent for more than 80,000 employees, at a cost of Rs 10.9 billion a year. As part of its fiscal consolidation the government reduced the budget deficit from 9.3 per cent of GDP in 2024–25 to an estimated 6.0 per cent in 2025–26 and budgeted 3.7 per cent for 2026–27; Moody's kept the country's investment-grade Baa3 rating, with a negative outlook.

The most debated reform concerned the basic retirement pension, payable to all residents from the age of 60, which Ramgoolam told the National Assembly had come to cost 7.8 per cent of GDP, more than the government spent on education, health and housing combined. The 2025 budget raised the eligibility age to 65 in stages; trade unions campaigned against the change, and the government added an income-support payment of Rs 10,000 for some of those affected. Drawing on the interim report of a commission of experts, the 2026 budget proposed a flexible "State Age Pension" that could be drawn from 60 at a reduced rate or deferred to 70, a means test and a new contributory National Pension and Provident Fund; after protests, Ramgoolam froze the means test on 22 June 2026 and confirmed in July that it had been abandoned.

In education the government replaced the contested Extended Programme with a Foundation Programme for literacy, numeracy and skills, eased the conditions of entry to Grade 12 and introduced Kreol Morisien as a subject in Grade 11. Faced with the energy shock caused by the conflict in the Middle East in 2026, it raised electricity tariffs by 15 per cent from 1 May while exempting about 128,800 of the 541,127 consumers, restricted non-essential uses of electricity and unblocked 405 megawatts of renewable-energy projects, part of a target of 60 per cent renewable energy by 2035. It also announced measures against losses in the water network, which the minister of public utilities put at 62 per cent, including a new dam at Rivière des Anguilles; ruled out further extensions of the Metro Express light railway because of its losses and debt; and pursued a programme of 8,000 social housing units. Recorded crime fell by 3 per cent in the first nine months of 2025, and more than Rs 5 billion worth of drugs was seized, including a record 433 kg aboard a ship in November.

=== Economic performance ===
According to the national accounts rebased to 2023, which Statistics Mauritius published in September 2026, the economy grew by 4.2 per cent in 2024 and 3.5 per cent in 2025; on the previous series the figures had been 4.9 and 3.2 per cent. Growth in 2025 was led by services: financial services and information and communication technology each grew by about 5 per cent, and tourism set records, with 1,436,250 visitors, 3.9 per cent more than in 2024, and receipts of Rs 103.3 billion, the first time they had exceeded Rs 100 billion. Foreign direct investment reached a record Rs 48 billion, mainly in real estate and financial services. Inflation, which had averaged about 7 per cent a year in 2022–2024 and peaked at 11.3 per cent, fell to 3.7 per cent in 2025; unemployment declined to 5.5 per cent in the second quarter of 2026; and gross official reserves stood at about US$9.8 billion in April 2026.

Investment and some traditional industries were weaker: gross fixed capital formation fell by 3.1 per cent in 2025, and construction and textiles contracted. Growth slowed to 2.0 per cent year on year in the first quarter of 2026 as the conflict in the Middle East raised fuel prices and weighed on tourism; the rupee weakened beyond Rs 48 to the US dollar in May, the Bank of Mauritius raised its key rate to 4.75 per cent, and inflation was expected to rise to about 5 per cent for the year. Statistics Mauritius forecast growth of 3.0 per cent for 2026 and the IMF 2.8 per cent; the IMF described the economy as resilient in the face of weakening conditions and called for continued fiscal consolidation, including through pension reform. In trade, a United States tariff on Mauritian goods announced at 40 per cent in April 2025 was cut to 15 per cent after Ramgoolam wrote to President Donald Trump; the renewal of the African Growth and Opportunity Act in February 2026 and Mauritius's exemption from new American tariffs in July 2026 restored preferential access to the US market.

=== Foreign relations ===
Ramgoolam meeting the Japanese prime minister, Shigeru Ishiba, in Yokohama in August 2025

After taking office Ramgoolam ordered an independent review of the draft treaty on the Chagos Archipelago that his predecessor had negotiated and submitted counter-proposals. He told the National Assembly in February 2025 that the earlier agreement "was a sell-out", because Mauritian sovereignty over Diego Garcia had not been "unambiguous and undiluted" and the financial package "was very badly negotiated"; the renegotiated terms, which he described as "inflation-proof", appeared to give Mauritius a veto over any extension of the lease. On 22 May 2025 Ramgoolam and the British prime minister, Keir Starmer, signed the Agreement concerning the Chagos Archipelago including Diego Garcia, under which the United Kingdom recognises Mauritian sovereignty over the whole archipelago, including Diego Garcia, and Mauritius authorises it to operate the joint British–American base there for an initial 99 years, in return for annual payments, which the British government put at an average of £101 million a year, and a trust fund for Chagossians. L'Express described the treaty in November 2025 as one of the government's undisputed successes. It had not entered into force by October 2026: after President Trump turned against the deal early that year, the British government paused ratification, and its implementing bill lapsed when Parliament was prorogued on 29 April. Ramgoolam said in March 2026 that his government was exploring legal avenues, set the United Kingdom a deadline of the end of July and in September travelled to London for talks with the British national security adviser, Jonathan Powell. At the Commonwealth summit in Antigua on 4 November 2026 he met the British prime minister, Andy Burnham; according to Downing Street the two agreed "to work on a shared plan to make further progress by the end of the year", and Ramgoolam's office said that he had stressed the need for a clear roadmap with a first deadline in December 2026. He rejected claims that the transfer would benefit China as a "disinformation campaign", saying that "Mauritius is aligned with India, not China".

Relations with India and France were strengthened. The Indian prime minister, Narendra Modi, was chief guest at the National Day celebrations on 12 March 2025, when the two countries raised their relationship to an "Enhanced Strategic Partnership" and Modi received the Grand Commander of the Order of the Star and Key of the Indian Ocean. During Ramgoolam's state visit to India in September 2025, which included visits to Varanasi and Ayodhya, India announced a special economic package of about US$680 million, and he returned to New Delhi in February 2026 for the India AI Impact Summit. On 20–21 November 2025 Emmanuel Macron made the first visit to Mauritius by a French head of state in thirty years; the two countries adopted a joint declaration whose priorities included maritime security, energy and water, and Macron conferred on Ramgoolam the Grand Cross of the Legion of Honour. He attended the ninth Tokyo International Conference on African Development in Yokohama in August 2025, where he held a summit meeting with the Japanese prime minister, Shigeru Ishiba; in May 2026 he co-chaired with France a round table on the blue economy at the Africa Forward summit in Nairobi, and in August he attended the SADC summit in Durban.

=== Coalition changes and the October 2026 unrest ===
Tensions within the coalition grew in 2026. On 20 March Bérenger resigned as deputy prime minister, saying that Ramgoolam should have appointed a separate minister of finance and citing unfulfilled pledges and the risk of a downgrade of the country's credit rating; the government kept its majority. The MMM's delegates voted on 11 April to remain in government, and on 13 April Bérenger left the party with Joanna Bérenger and Chetan Baboolall, who became Leader of the Opposition in August; Bérenger went on to lead a new party, the Fron Militan Progresis. On 4 May 2026 Arianne Navarre-Marie of the MMM became deputy prime minister, the first woman to hold the office.

On the night of 9 October 2026 a police officer at a checkpoint in Camp-Levieux shot and seriously wounded a 27-year-old woman returning from work; the officer and three colleagues were arrested, and the government flew in a medical team from India to operate on her. Anger at the shooting, in a country already suffering prolonged water cuts because of drought, led to several nights of rioting from 12 October in which roads were blocked, tyres burned and police stations attacked; reports suggested that the violence had been coordinated, possibly with links to drug traffickers. On 13 October Ramgoolam imposed a night-time curfew on about a third of the island, the first since the COVID-19 pandemic, and appealed for calm; it was eased over the following weekend and lifted on 19 October, when he announced a national consultation with non-governmental organisations and specialists on the situation of young people. Business Mauritius estimated the economic losses at between Rs 270 million and Rs 470 million, and Bérenger called for the prime minister's resignation.

== Political positions and style ==
Ramgoolam's governments have combined market-oriented economic policies with social protection; in 2010 Agence France-Presse described his economic policy as pragmatic, seeking to marry a liberalism designed to attract foreign investors with social protection for the poorest Mauritians. He has repeatedly championed changes to the electoral and constitutional system, from the "Second Republic" proposed in 2014, which would have created a directly elected president and seats filled from party lists, to the proportional seats and the abolition of the declaration of community discussed in 2026. Mauritian sovereignty over the Chagos Archipelago has been a constant of his foreign policy, from the arbitration begun in 2010 to the treaty of 2025, and he describes Mauritius as aligned with India.

Commentators describe Ramgoolam as a charismatic politician, known for his tailored suits and for speeches in English full of literary references and quotations; his 2026 budget speech, for example, quoted C. S. Lewis and Frédéric Bastiat. He has dominated the Labour Party for more than three decades, controlling its choice of candidates, and the historian Jocelyn Chan Low has contrasted his deliberate pace of decision-making with Bérenger's urgency. His career has unfolded in a political system dominated by a few families Bloomberg noted in 2024 that members of only three families had led the country since independence and he has alternately allied with and opposed both the Jugnauths and Bérenger. Reviewing his career when he returned to power in 2024, L'Express wrote that he had gained in maturity and had done better in his second premiership than in his first.

== Personal life ==
On 8 July 1979 Ramgoolam married Veena Brizmohun, a Mauritian who had grown up in England and was completing studies in social sciences at the University of London; the wedding, at the BDC cinema in Quatre Bornes, was attended by some 2,000 guests, among them the governor-general, Sir Dayendranath Burrenchobay, and the leader of the opposition, Anerood Jugnauth. He has described his wife as a force behind the scenes of his career. His interests include political biography, jazz and classical music, chess, reading and horse riding, and he is a member of the Mauritius Turf Club.

== Controversies, scandals, and legal issues ==
=== 1978 arrest by British police ===
Navin Ramgoolam was arrested in the UK on 24 May 1978 in Wardour Street, Soho, London according to records of the Foreign Colonial Office (FCO). He was a student at University College London (UCL). British Police noticed Navin Ramgoolam driving dangerously as he committed a number of offences such as driving through a red traffic light, and performing an illegal u-turn where it was prohibited. Although he was not entitled to Diplomatic Immunity Navin Ramgoolam attempted to claim such protection after refusing to provide a breath specimen. When Navin Ramgoolam was subjected to a blood test the result was positive. As a result he was summoned for driving with excess alcohol in his blood, and was fined at Malborough Street Magistrate Court where he eventually pleaded guilty.

=== 1984 assault of SSR at Le Reduit ===
Harish Boodhoo reminisced a scene that he witnessed at Le Château de Réduit soon after Sushil Ramgoolam's death in January 1984 whereby an intoxicated Navin Ramgoolam had assaulted his father Seewoosagur Ramgoolam and was threatening to further attack him with a sword.

=== 1997 Albion Gate macarena party ===
In March 1997 local residents of Albion village complained to the police about a noisy party held at a Labour Party political activist's bungalow. Several young women and even an under-age girl had been invited to the "Macarena Private Party" by the activist and they had to dance and undress to the tunes of Los Del Rio's song "Macarena". One woman escaped from the bungalow where former Prime Minister Navin Ramgoolam and his close associates former MP Iqbal Mallam-Hassam, Air Mauritius executive Nash Mallam-Hassam, and optician Farouk Hossen were also partying and drinking heavily. A few days later Ajay Daby, the lawyer who later represented the young women, brandished a black underwear at a public meeting, claiming that it belonged to a well known politician and that it had been recovered on Albion beach. Los Del Rio's song "Macarena" was subjected to a ban by the state's radio station MBC following Navin Ramgoolam's orders. Within three months the Labour-MMM coalition collapsed. The political scandal was also known as Albion Gate and Affaire Macarena by the local press.

=== 2009 Varma tax evasion and conflict of interest ===
In December 2009 Labour Party minister Vasant Bunwaree made revelations in parliament about Yatin Varma, who was then a close associate and campaign manager of then Prime Minister Navin Ramgoolam. Bunwaree revealed that Varma had been receiving additional income as the legal counsel of several parastatal institutions although he was already being paid as a member of the National Assembly. Bunwaree added that Varma regularly emailed elected ministers which read «I would be grateful if you could kindly consider appointing me as legal advisor on a monthly basis to one of your institutions falling under your responsibility». Bunwaree also spoke about a well-known case of tax evasion involving Varma which had been known to members of the National Assembly. Despite all of Bunwaree's revelations, Navin Ramgoolam did not investigate or sanction Varma.

=== Travel companion Jessica Weber ===
In March 2015, Chief Whip Mahen Jhugroo raised a question in the National Assembly about Navin Ramgoolam's young travel companion Jessica Weber for whom the position of "VIP Facilitation Organizer" had been specifically created within the Prime Minister's Office (PMO) since 2013. Weber was recruited by Serge Petit, CEO of Airports of Mauritius Ltd without the board's approval. Although she benefitted from a government monthly salary of Rs 100,000, minister Xavier-Luc Duval discovered that there was no evidence of any events that she had organised, and there was no justification for her multiple trips with Navin Ramgoolam overseas.

=== 2010 verbal abuse of Nita Deerpalsing ===
On the public holiday of 1 May 2010 during a public meeting of the Labour-MMM coalition Alliance de l'Avenir in Quatre-Bornes Navin Ramgoolam became frustrated about a defective microphone. He soon lost his temper and abused the director of communication of the Labour Party (Mauritius) Kumaree Rajeshree Deerpalsing, also known as Nita Deerpalsing by yelling Li pas marsé ta putain (meaning "It does not work, you slut". The abuse was broadcast live by other radio stations which were covering the event and was reproduced several times on social media as an example of Navin Ramgoolam's lack of respect for women.

=== 2010 purchase of Rs 40 millions bungalow using Super Cash Back Gold funds ===
The former minister of financial services (Roshi Bhadain) revealed that in 2010 Navin Ramgoolam had contracted a loan of Rs 40 millions from Bramer Bank to purchase a bungalow at Roches Noires. Bramer Bank was then part of Dawood Rawat's British American Insurance (BAI) group of companies. Instructions were given by BAI's management to its subsidiary Bramer Bank that BAI will fully guarantee Navin Ramgoolam's Rs 40 millions loan, given that Dawood Rawat was Ramgoolam's close friend and major sponsor of his political campaigns. The Rs 40 millions came from a pension fund called Super Cash Back Gold which was administered by BAI. By 2015 BAI had collapsed, contributors to pension fund Super Cash Back Gold lost their pension funds, and as part of a bail-out Bramer Bank was replaced by the National Commercial Bank. However to this date Navin Ramgoolam has not repaid any of the Rs 40 millions that he had borrowed. A seizure order for the repossession of his unpaid debt is what prompted Navin Ramgoolam to sell the bungalow.

=== 2014 Nandanee Soornack fleeing to Italy and daughter Xara Keiron Chandra ===
Soon after the proclamation of the December 2014 general elections in Mauritius Nandanee Soornack (born Nandanee Oogarah), girlfriend and close associate of Navin Ramgoolam, fled to Italy with 12 suitcases. The former shop assistant and wife of a bus driver amassed substantial wealth and influence after becoming an activist of the Parti Travailliste and received preferential treatment in large government contracts, especially in the tourism sector and airport facilities. Investigations showed that a number of offshore companies and bank accounts had been set up in order to channel funds out of Mauritius. Investigators in Mauritius attempted to deport her back to Mauritius. Nandanee Soornack attempted to silence newspapers Le Mauricien and La Sentinelle by applying for a Gagging Order. She revealed that Navin Ramgoolam is the father of her daughter Xara Keiron Chandra who was born in 2009. Navin Ramgoolam's illegitimate love child was mentioned during public gatherings, for example by Prime Minister Pravind Jugnauth on 19 August 2017 at the village of Circonstance in St Pierre.

=== 2014 London suitcase and Rolls-Royce RR10RAM ===
After claiming to be visiting London for the tenth time to discuss a legal matter with British counsel Phillipe Sands, Navin Ramgoolam was spotted in his chauffeur-driven Rolls-Royce bearing number plate RR10RAM as he carried a suitcase to a bank, where an attendant recognised and greeted him with "How are you Mr Banker?"

=== 2015 arrest for conspiracy and money laundering ===
In February 2015, Navin Ramgoolam was arrested for alleged conspiracy, money laundering and as part of a July 2011 robbery (Affaire Roches-Noires). The police intervention was known as Opération Lakaz Lerwa Lion. Local police searched his home located at Riverwalk in Floréal and discovered safes and suitcases containing around $6.4 million in various foreign currencies, 9 exclusive American Express Black credit cards, as well as packets of Viagra sexual stimulant pills. He was later released and charges against him were dropped due to lack of sufficient evidence and the prosecution's delay in lodging the case.

=== Proximity with Shahebzada Azaree ===
The Commission of Enquiry on Drug Trafficking, led by retired judge Paul Lam Shang Leen received a letter in late 2017 detailing the financing of the Labour Party by people involved in drug trafficking, such as Shahebzada Azaree (also known as Dade Azaree) of Gloria Fast Food. In April 2017 Azaree was arrested by the ICAC, charged with money laundering, after the seizure of 155 kilograms of the drug heroin, worth more than Rs 2 Billion, in a cargo of gas cylinders intercepted in a shipment at Port Louis harbour. In August 2017 a photo of Navin Ramgoolam with Shahebzada Azaree was published by L'Express in its program Menteur, Menteur. Azaree was also a prominent and active supporter of Navin Ramgoolam's party during the 2014 electoral campaign. He was again arrested in June 2017 soon after accusations of drug trafficking were made against him by police constable Moonsamy Govindasamy Basana-Reddi, after the seizure of 1.26 kg of heroin (worth Rs 18.9 million) being imported into Mauritius at the airport.

=== 2024 Phone Tapping scandal ===
During the 2024 electoral campaign, audio recordings of various public figures were leaked on social media under the guise of a fictitious figure calling himself Missie Moustass. Roshi Bhadain reminded the public that despite his denials, Navin Ramgoolam was the original instigator of illegal phone-tapping of his political adversaries. Indeed soon after the 1995 general elections the new PTR-MMM government, headed by Navin Ramgoolam, sought the services of Israeli firm Verint to enable the Mauritian police intelligence unit, known as the National Security Service (NSS), to improve its phone-tapping capabilities. This police branch was previously known as the National Intelligence Unit (NIU), and during colonial times it was called State Security Service (SSS). In 1999 Ramgoolam approved the purchase of a sophisticated Monitoring Main Centre, including the suitcase-sized IMSI-Catcher (International Mobile Subscriber Identity). The latter was designed to be installed in vehicles, and enabled spying and recording of private telephone conversations over a range of several kilometres. Before the 2014 General Elections Navin Ramgoolam commissioned a team of engineers and technicians from private firm Verint to visit Mauritius for a week in order to train the intelligence officers of the NSS. The representatives of Verint, who stayed at Hotel Intercontinental in Balaclava, were Charalampas Leventis of Cyprus, Tom Lempert of Brasil, and Daniel George Pryett from the UK. A Nissan armored van was specially kitted out with the IMSI-Catcher. Despite all these measures, Navin Ramgoolam lost the 2014 General Elections in a landslide defeat. Ramgoolam again failed to be elected at the 2019 General Elections. In 2016, for his in-depth reporting on this illegal practice, reporter Abhi Ramsahaye won the Prix Nicolas Lambert for the best investigative report.

== Honours and awards ==
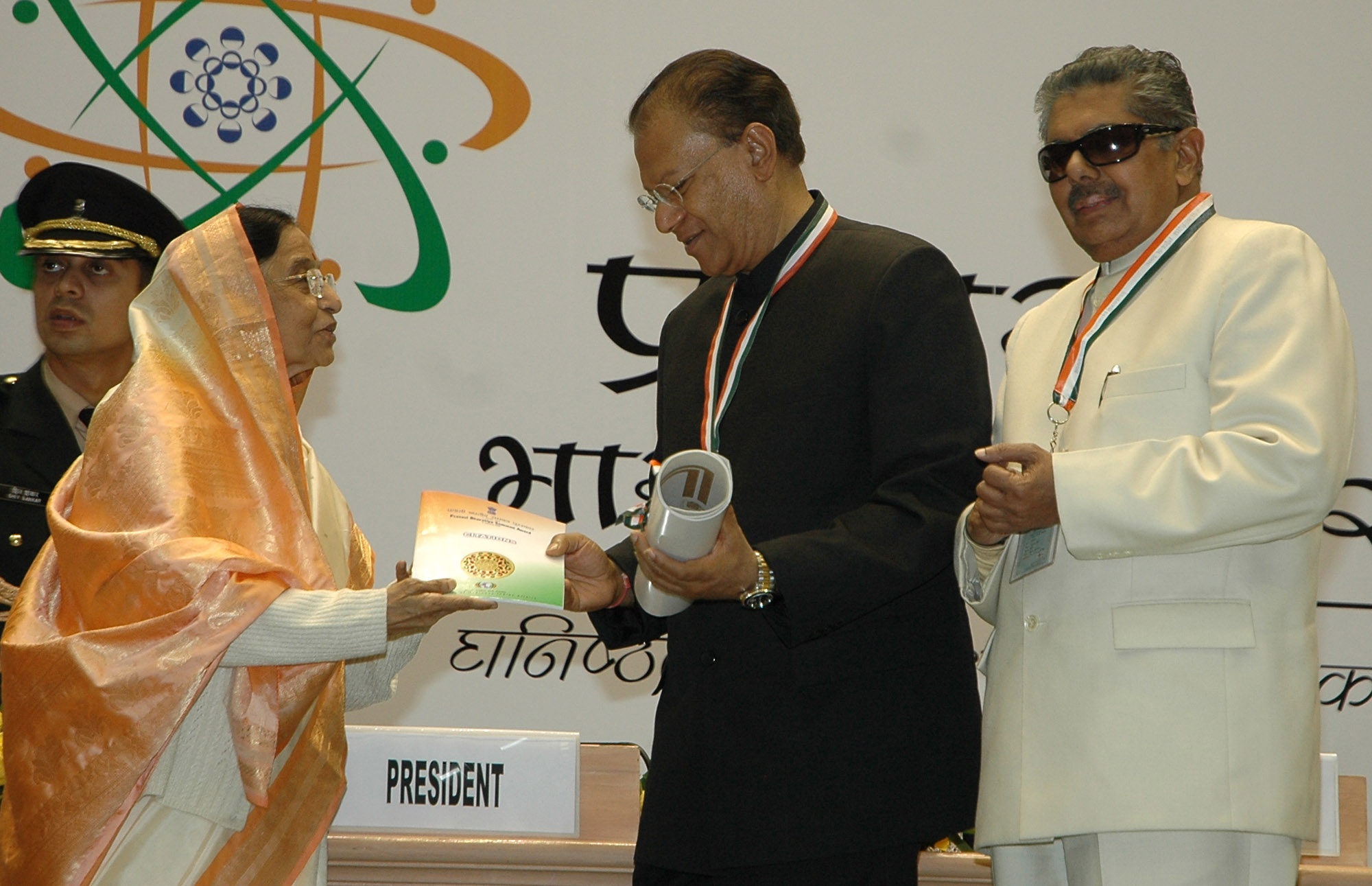
Ramgoolam receiving the Pravasi Bharatiya Samman from the President of India, Pratibha Patil, in 2008

Ramgoolam was appointed a Grand Commander of the Order of the Star and Key of the Indian Ocean (GCSK) in 2008. France made him a Grand Officer of the Legion of Honour in 2006 and raised him to its highest rank, the Grand Cross, in 2025, and India awarded him the Pravasi Bharatiya Samman in 2008. His academic and professional distinctions include the following:

- Honorary fellow of the London School of Economics (1998)
- Honorary doctorates from the University of Mauritius (1998), Aligarh Muslim University (1998), Jawaharlal Nehru University (2005), Padmashree Dr D. Y. Patil University (2009), Staffordshire University (2010) and Kurukshetra University (2012)
- Honorary Freeman of Rodrigues (2007)
- Wilberforce Medal, Hull (2007)
- Rajiv Gandhi Award (2007)
- Prix Louise Michel (2008)
- Fellow of the Royal College of Physicians of London (2009)
- Order of the Rule of Law of the World Jurist Association (2011)
- Overseas Bencher of the Inner Temple (2011)

== See also ==
- List of prime ministers of Mauritius
- Fourth Navin Ramgoolam cabinet

== Notes ==
Political offices
Preceded by Anerood Jugnauth	Prime Minister of Mauritius; 1995–2000	Succeeded by Anerood Jugnauth
Preceded by Paul Bérenger	Prime Minister of Mauritius; 2005–2014	Succeeded by Anerood Jugnauth
Preceded by Pravind Jugnauth	Prime Minister of Mauritius; 2024–present	Incumbent
Preceded by Renganaden Padayachy	Minister of Finance; 2024–present	Incumbent
Party political offices
Preceded by Satcam Boolell	Leader of the Labour Party; 1991–present	Incumbent
