= Babita Thanoo =

Mauritian politician

MP for Quartier Militaire–Moka
- Incumbent
- Assumed office 29 November 2024

Personal details
- Party: Rezistans ek Alternativ

Babita Thanoo is a Mauritian politician from Rezistans ek Alternativ. She was elected a member of the National Assembly of Mauritius in 2024.
