= Ravin Jagarnath =

Mauritian politician

MP for Savanne–Black River
- Incumbent
- Assumed office 29 November 2024

Personal details
- Party: Mauritian Militant Movement

Ravin Jagarnath is a Mauritian politician from the Mauritian Militant Movement (MMM). He was elected a member of the National Assembly of Mauritius in 2024. He was previously chairman of the Savanne District Council.
