= Mahend Gungapersad =

Mauritian politician

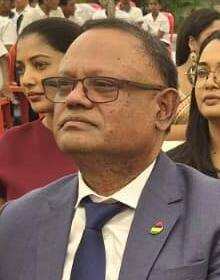
- Mahend Gungapersad in 2025

Minister of Education and Human Resource
- Incumbent
- Assumed office 22 November 2024

Personal details
- Party: Labour Party

Mahend Gungapersad is a Mauritian politician from the Labour Party (PTr). He has served as Minister of Education and Human Resource in the fourth Navin Ramgoolam cabinet since 2024.

== Family ==
His father Kalachand Gungapersad died in 2024.
