= Kugan Parapen =

Mauritian politician

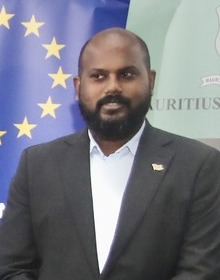
- Kugan Parapen in 2025

Junior Minister of Social Integration, Social Security and National Solidarity
- Incumbent
- Assumed office 22 November 2024

Personal details
- Party: Rezistans ek Alternativ

Kugan Parapen is a Mauritian politician from the Rezistans ek Alternativ (ReA). He has served as Junior Minister of Social Integration, Social Security and National Solidarity in the fourth Navin Ramgoolam cabinet since 2024. He is an economist by profession.
