= Dhaneshwar Damry =

Mauritian politician

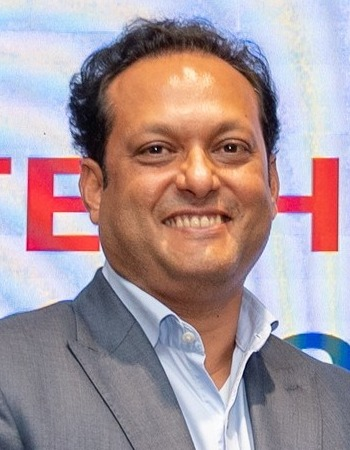
- Dhaneshwar Damry in 2025

Junior Minister of Finance
- Incumbent
- Assumed office 22 November 2024

Personal details
- Party: Labour Party

Dhaneshwar Damry is a Mauritian politician from the Labour Party (PTr). He is currently serving as Junior Minister of Finance in the fourth Navin Ramgoolam cabinet since 2024.
