= Franco Quirin =

Mauritian politician

MP for Beau Bassin and Petite Rivière
- Incumbent
- Assumed office 2010

Personal details
- Party: Independent (since 2025)
- Other political affiliations: Mauritian Militant Movement (until 2025)

Jean Patrice France Quirin is a Mauritian politician. He is a member of the National Assembly of Mauritius.

On 2 February 2025, Quirin was expelled from the Mauritian Militant Movement. Since 4 February 2025, he sits as an independent.
