= Ranjiv Woochit =

Mauritian politician

Minister of Local Government
- Incumbent
- Assumed office 22 November 2024

Personal details
- Party: Labour Party

Ranjiv (Nitin) Woochit is a Mauritian politician from the Labour Party (PTr). He has served as Minister of Local Government in the fourth Navin Ramgoolam cabinet since 2024.
