= Raj Pentiah =

Mauritian politician

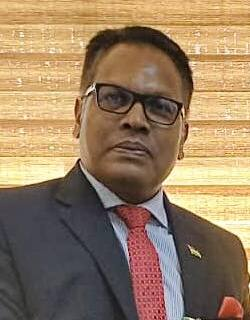
- Raj Pentiah in 2025

Minister of Public Service and Administrative Reforms
- Incumbent
- Assumed office 22 November 2024

Personal details
- Party: Labour Party

Raj Lutchmanah Pentiah is a Mauritian politician from the Labour Party (PTr). He has served as Minister of Public Service and Administrative Reforms in the fourth Navin Ramgoolam cabinet since 2024.
