= Mahendra Gondeea =

Mauritian politician

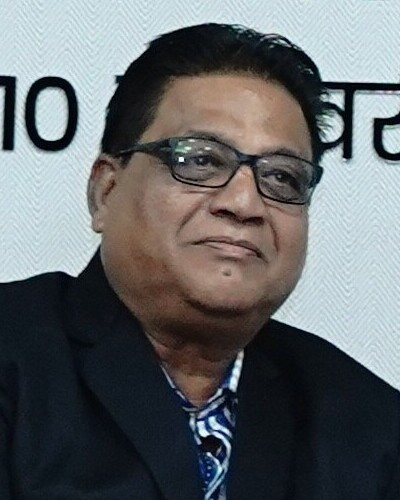
- Mahendra Gondeea in 2025

Minister of Arts and Culture
- Incumbent
- Assumed office 22 November 2024

Personal details
- Party: Labour Party

Mahendra Osk Gondeea is a Mauritian politician from the Labour Party (PTr). He is the Minister of Arts and Culture of the Republic of Mauritius in the fourth Navin Ramgoolam cabinet since 2024.
