= Fabrice David =

Mauritian politician

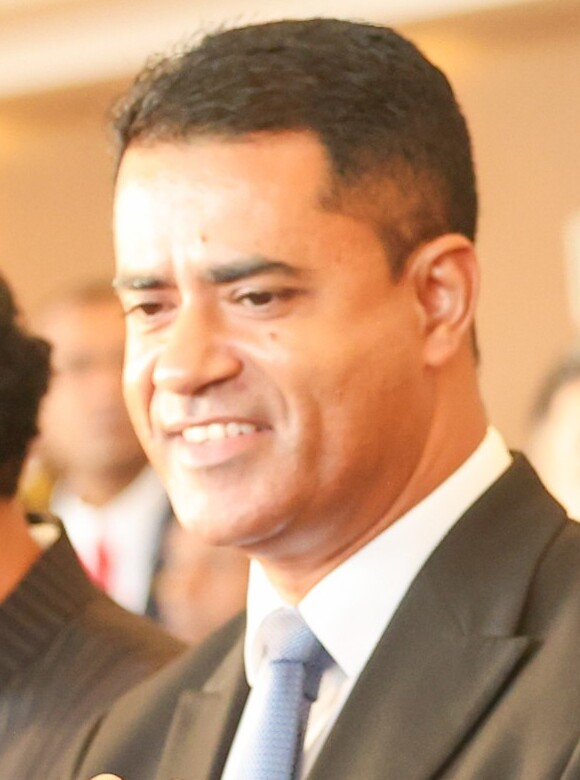
- Fabrice David in 2025

Junior Minister of Agro-Industry, Food Security, Blue Economy and Fisheries
- Incumbent
- Assumed office 22 November 2024

Personal details
- Party: Labour Party

Fabrice Gilles David is a Mauritian politician from the Labour Party (PTr). He has served as Junior Minister of Agro-Industry, Food Security, Blue Economy and Fisheries in the fourth Navin Ramgoolam cabinet since 2024.
