= Rezistans ek Alternativ =

Political party in Mauritius

Resistance and Alternatives Rezistans ek Alternativ Résistance et Alternatives
- Abbreviation: ReA
- Leader: Ashok Subron
- Founded: March 2005
- Split from: Lalit
- Ideology: Anti-Communal violence Democratic socialism Eco-socialism; Ecological politics
- Political position: Left-wing
- National affiliation: Alliance du Changement (since 2024)
- Colours: Green; Yellow
- National Assembly: 3 / 66

Rezistans ek Alternativ (French: Résistance et Alternatives, ReA) is a political party in Mauritius founded in March 2005.

== L'alliance du changement coalition ==
For the 2024 Mauritian general election, the party has aligned with the Alliance du Changement coalition, which also includes the Labour Party, the Mauritian Militant Movement, and the Nouveau Démocrates party.

== Election results ==
=== Legislative elections ===
| Election | Leader | Coalition | Votes | % | Seats | +/– | Position | Status |
|---|---|---|---|---|---|---|---|---|
| 2005 | Ashok Subron | —N/a | 2,964 | 0.15 | 0 / 60 | New | ▲3rd | No seats |
| 2010 | Ashok Subron | —N/a | Did not contest | | | | | No seats |
| 2014 | Ashok Subron | —N/a | 23,117 | 1.13 | 0 / 69 | New | ▲4th | No seats |
| 2019 | Ashok Subron | —N/a | Did not contest | | | | | No seats |
| 2024 | Ashok Subron | ReA–PTR–MMM–ND | 63,730 | 2.72 | 3 / 60 | ▲3 | ▲3rd | Coalition |
