= Aadil Ameer Meea =

Mauritian politician

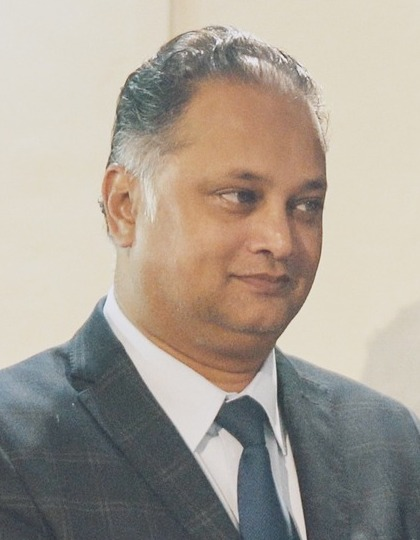
- Aadil Ameer Meea in 2025

Minister of Industry, SMEs and Cooperatives
- Incumbent
- Assumed office 22 November 2024

Personal details
- Party: Mauritian Militant Movement

Aadil Ameer Meea is a Mauritian politician from the Mauritian Militant Movement (MMM). He has served as Minister of Industry, SMEs and Cooperatives in the fourth Navin Ramgoolam cabinet since 2024.

== Career ==
He started his professional career in 1991 at Deloitte and Touche Kemp Chatteris as an Audit Senior, then as a Manager in Transaction Advisory Services at Ernst & Young from 2001 to 2010.
