= National Assembly (Mauritius) =

Parliament of Mauritius

Coordinates: 20.1630°S 57.5033°E

National Assembly of Mauritius Assemblée nationale de Maurice Lasanble Nasional Moris
- 8th National Assembly

Type
- Type: Unicameral

History
- Founded: 30 July 1968 (as Legislative Assembly); 12 March 1992 (as National Assembly)

Leadership
- Speaker: Shirin Aumeeruddy-Cziffra, Independent since 29 November 2024
- Deputy Speaker: Veda Baloomoody, MMM since 29 November 2024
- Leader of the House: Navin Ramgoolam, Labour since 12 November 2024
- Leader of the Opposition: Chetan Baboolall, FMP since 6 August 2026

Structure
- Seats: 66
- Political groups: Government (59): AdC (55); PTr (34); MMM (15); ND (3); ReA (3); OPR (2); AL (2); Opposition (6): FMP (4); MSM (1); PMSD (1); Independent (1): Independent (1)

Elections
- Voting system: Plurality block voting
- Last election: 10 November 2024
- Next election: By November 2029

Meeting place
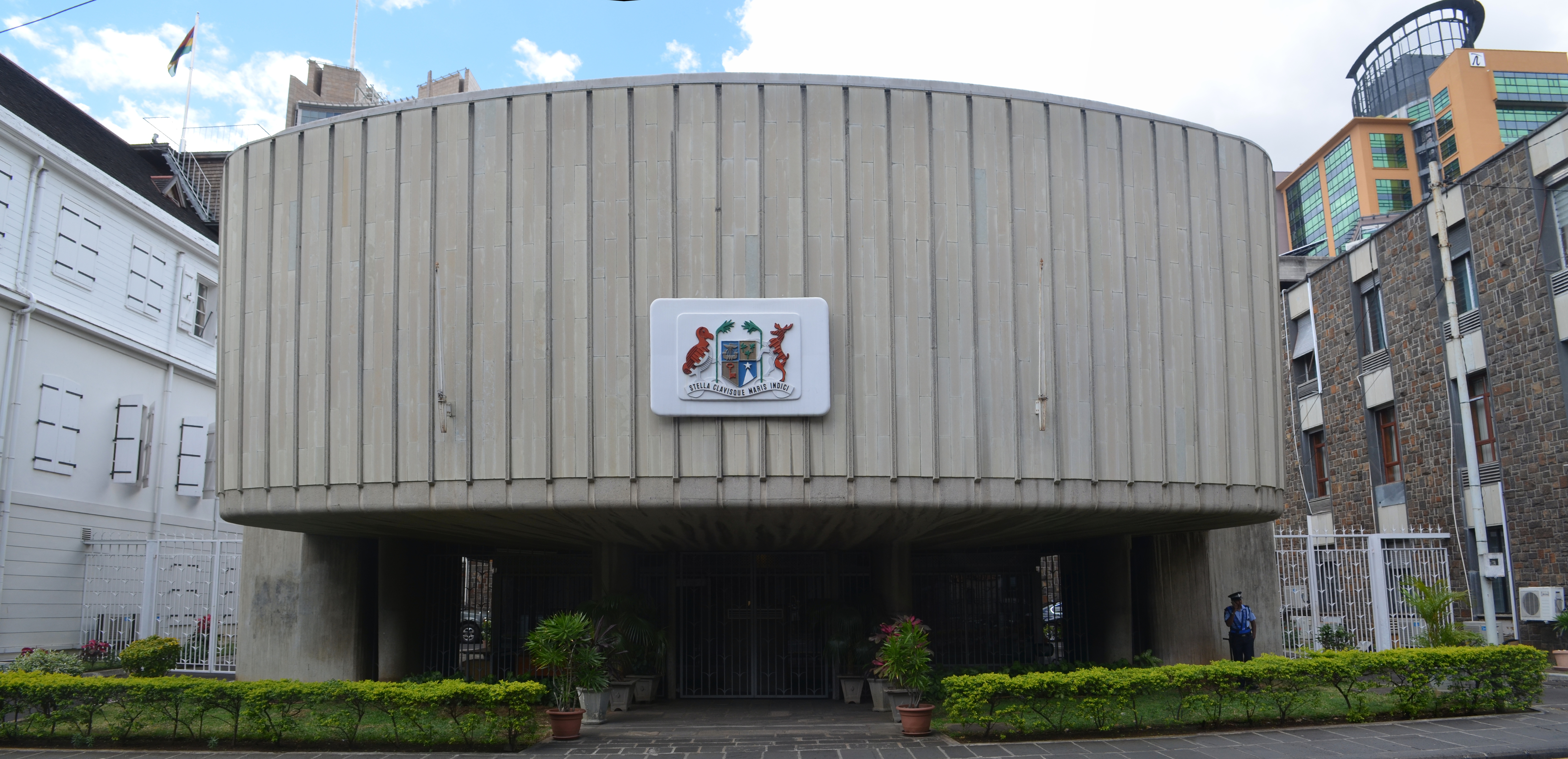
- Parliament House, Port Louis

Website
- Official website

The National Assembly (French: Assemblée nationale; Morisyen: Lasanble Nasional) is Mauritius' unicameral legislature, which was called the Legislative Assembly from 1968 until 1992, when the country became a republic. Prior to 1968 and under British rule it was known as the Legislative Council. The Constitution of Mauritius provides for the parliament of Mauritius to consist of the President and the National Assembly. The parliament of Mauritius is modelled after the Westminster system of parliamentary democracy, where members of parliament are voted in at regular general elections, on the basis of a first past the post system. The working language of the National Assembly is English.

It consists of 66 members, 62 directly elected for five-year terms in multi-member constituencies and 4 additional members, known as "best losers", appointed by the Electoral Supervisory Commission to ensure that ethnic and religious minorities are equitably represented. The Government is primarily responsible to the National Assembly and the prime minister stays in office with the confidence of a majority of its members.

== Constitutional role ==
The National Assembly is supreme and determines the functioning of various constitutional institutions of the country.

=== President ===
The President of Mauritius and Vice-President of Mauritius are both elected by the assembly for a five-year term.

=== Government ===
The National Assembly is essential to determine which party/group forms the government and therefore the executive of the country. As per the constitution, the prime minister is answerable to and must maintain the support of the assembly. Thus, whenever the office of prime minister falls vacant, the president appoints the person who has the support of the House, or who is most likely to command the support of the House—normally the leader of the largest party in the assembly.

=== Opposition ===
The political party or alliance which has the second largest majority forms the Official Opposition and its leader is normally nominated by the President of the Republic as the Leader of the Opposition.

== Composition ==
The Assembly is made of up of 70 members, of whom 62 are directly elected in 21 constituencies. The island of Mauritius is divided into 20 constituencies returning three members each and that of Rodrigues is a single constituency returning two members. After a general election, the Electoral Supervisory Commission may nominate up to a maximum of 8 additional members in accordance with section 5 of the First Schedule of the Constitution with a view to correct any imbalance in community representation in Parliament. This system of nominating members is commonly called the best loser system.

The political party or party alliance which wins the majority of seats in the Assembly forms the government and its leader usually becomes the Prime Minister. It is the Prime Minister who selects the members of the composition of the Cabinet from elected members of the Assembly, except for the Attorney General, who may not be an elected member of the Assembly.

== Represented political parties ==
A new assembly was elected on 10 November 2024, and a new coalition government was appointed with Navin Ramgoolam as prime minister. The following political parties are represented in the assembly (based on the number of MPs):

Name		Leader	Seats
PTr	Labour Party; Parti travailliste	Navin Ramgoolam	34 / 66
MMM	Mauritian Militant Movement; Mouvement Militant Mauricien	Vacant	15 / 66
FMP	Fron Militan Progresis	Paul Bérenger	4 / 66
ND	New Democrats; Nouveaux Démocrates	Khushal Lobine	3 / 66
ReA	Rezistans ek Alternativ	Ashok Subron	3 / 66
OPR	Rodrigues People's Organisation; Organisation du Peuple Rodriguais	Francisco François	2 / 66
AL	Alliance Liberation	Dianette Henriette-Manan	2 / 66
MSM	Militant Socialist Movement; Mouvement Socialiste Militant	Pravind Jugnauth	1 / 66
PMSD	Parti Mauricien Social Démocrate	Xavier-Luc Duval	1 / 66
Independent		None	1 / 66

== Procedures ==
After a new assembly is elected, the President, by proclamation, may open the new session fixing the date and time of the sitting. The government message (replacing the speech of the throne) is read by the President. The Assembly normally sits on Tuesdays as from 11:30 AM when it is in session. The President acting on the advice of the prime minister may at any time adjourn, prorogue or dissolve the assembly.

== Officials/functions of the Assembly ==
The following positions/body have important functions in the assembly. They are as follows:

- The Speaker – the main function of the Speaker is to ensure that the Standing Orders and Rules of the National Assembly are complied with. The Speaker interprets and enforces the Standing Orders and for the purpose of interpretation, recourse is often had to Erskine May: Parliamentary Practice, responds to Members' points of order and give rulings when necessary. The Speaker symbolizes the authority of Parliament.
- The Deputy Speaker – the deputy speaker assists and acts as the speaker when the latter is out of office.
- The Leader of the House (Prime Minister) – the president acting on the advice of the prime minister may at any time adjourn, prorogue or dissolve the assembly.
- The Leader of the Opposition – the office holder is usually to level criticism against the policy and administration of Government and to outline the alternative policies.
- The Attorney General – the office holder is the national legal adviser to the government and the assembly.
- The Government Chief Whip – along with the Opposition whip, sets the agenda for the parliamentary work.
- The Opposition Whip – along with the Chief Whip, sets the agenda for the parliamentary work.
- The Government Deputy Chief Whip – replaces the Chief Whip when the latter is out of office.
- The Chairperson of Public Accounts Committee
- The Deputy Chairperson of Committees
- The Clerk
- The Mace – symbol of authority
- The Serjeant-At-Arms
- The Secretariat
- The Library
- The parliamentary reporters

== See also ==
- List of speakers of the National Assembly of Mauritius
- Politics of Mauritius
- List of legislatures by country
- Government of Mauritius
