= Labour Party (Mauritius) =

Political party in Mauritius

Labour Party Parti Travayis Parti travailliste
- Abbreviation: PTr
- Leader: Navin Ramgoolam
- President: Patrick Assirvaden
- General Secretary: Kalyanee Juggoo
- Founders: Maurice Curé, Emmanuel Anquetil etc.
- Founded: 23 February 1936
- Headquarters: Les Salines, Port Louis
- Newspaper: Advance
- Youth wing: Young Labour
- Ideology: Social democracy
- Political position: Centre-left
- National affiliation: Alliance du Changement (since 2024)
- International affiliation: Socialist International
- Colours: Red
- National Assembly: 35 / 66

Website
- www.labourparty.mu

The Labour Party (French: Parti travailliste, pronounced [paʁti tʁavajist]; Mauritian Creole: Parti Travayis, PTr) is a centre-left social democratic political party in Mauritius. It is one of two main Mauritian political parties, along with the Mauritian Militant Movement (MMM).The party is led by Navin Ramgoolam. It tends to be more popular amongst Indo-Mauritians, especially in more rural areas.

Founded in 1936, the Labour Party is the oldest major political party in the Republic and has remained in power from 1948 to 1982, from 1995 to 2000 and from 2005 to 2014. From 1983 to 1990, it was part of a coalition government as a minority partner. As a member of the Labour Party-MMM alliance, it elected four members of parliament in the general election of 2014.

== History ==
The Mauritius Labour Party was founded in 1936. Its founding principles mirrored those of the British Labour Party: to protect workers' rights and freedoms and support a higher wage rate with paid leave. The movement was encouraged by 55 conferences held by the party leaders throughout the country. Among other goals were resolutions to obtain suffrage for working class representation in the Legislative Council, establish a Department of Labour, prohibit capitalist exploitation of sugar plantations and implement socialist values among Mauritian government agencies.

The party founders were Maurice Curé, Jean Prosper, Mamode Assenjee, Hassenjee Jeetoo, Barthelemy Ohsan, Samuel Barbe, Emmanuel Anquetil, Godefroy Moutia and Pandit Sahadeo. Cure served as President of the Party until he was forced to resign in 1941, at which point Anquetil took over. Anquetil died in December 1946, and Guy Rozemont served as leader until his death in 1956 at age 41.

The arrival of Seewoosagur Ramgoolam in 1958 marked an important step. He was in favor of an independent Mauritius within the Commonwealth of Nations. Following the victory of the Independence Party in the general election of 1967, a constitutional agreement was made in Parliament following conferences in Lancaster and London. The coalition government, including the Labour Party, and the IFB and CAM sealed the pact for Independence. The Labour Party, led by Ramgoolam, along with Veerasamy Ringadoo, Satcam Boolell and Harold Walter, in coalition with the CAM led by Abdool Razack Mohamed and the IFB led by Sookdeo Bissoondoyal, pushed a motion in the Legislative Council to provide for an independent country to be declared on 12 March 1968.

The Labour Party joined forces with PMSD of Gaetan Duval in 1969 to form a coalition government. In December 1976, Labour won only 28 seats out of 70, as opposed to 34 for the Bérenger's MMM Boodhoo's PSM, but remained in power by forming another alliance with the PMSD. In 1982, however, the MMM won outright, and Ramgoolam even lost his parliamentary seat. Anerood Jugnauth of the MSM became Prime Minister. From 1983 through 1995, the Labour Party attracted little electoral support; and in 1984, Satcam Boolell, who had replaced Ramgoolam as party leader, agreed to an electoral alliance with the Militant Socialist Movement, which had broken away from the MMM.

In 1995 Labour returned to power with MMM's support. Navin Ramgoolam, who had taken over the party leadership in 1991, became Prime Minister of Mauritius for the first time. It lost the subsequent legislative election in 2000, however: its coalition with the Mauritian Party of Xavier-Luc Duval secured only 36.6% of the popular vote and eight of seventy seats.

Labour returned to power in the 2005 elections as part of the Alliance Sociale, which won 42 of the 70 seats. In the general election of 2010, the party formed the majority of L'Alliance de L'Avenir, which regrouped the Mauritius Labour Party, the MSM and the PMSD. The Alliance de L'Avenir won the 2010 general election with forty-one seats against eighteen seats for the MMM-led L'Alliance du Coeur, with one seat taken by the FSM. However, on 6 August 2011 the Alliance broke down, leaving only the Mauritius Labour Party, the PMSD and the Republican Movement (MR) in the government. The 2014 general elections saw the victory of a MSM-PMSD-ML coalition (known as "L'alliance Lepep"). Labour Party lost and voters rejected government plans to expand presidential powers. In the November 2019 elections, Mauritius’ ruling Militant Socialist Movement (MSM) won more than half of the seats and Labour Party lost again, securing incumbent Prime Minister Pravind Kumar Jugnauth a new five-year term.

In the 2024 general elections, the Alliance of Change, led by the Labour Party won with a clear score of 60-0.

== Past leaders ==
- 1936-1941 Maurice Curé
- 1941-1946 Emmanuel Anquetil
- 1946-1956 Guy Rozemont
- 1956-1959 Renganaden Seeneevassen
- 1959-1984 Seewoosagur Ramgoolam
- 1984-1991 Satcam Boolell
- 1991–present Navin Ramgoolam

== Election results ==
=== Legislative elections ===
Election	Leader	Coalition			Cand.	Seats	+/–	Position	Status
Election	Leader	Parties	Votes	%	Cand.	Seats	+/–	Position	Status
1959	Seewoosagur; Ramgoolam	—N/a				24 / 40	▲11	1st	Coalition
1963	Seewoosagur; Ramgoolam	—N/a				19 / 40	▼5	1st	Coalition
1967	Seewoosagur; Ramgoolam	PTr–IFB–CAM	444,737	54.66		24 / 70	▲24	1st	Coalition
1976	Seewoosagur; Ramgoolam	PTr–CAM	461,949	38.08		28 / 70	▲4	▼2nd	Opposition
1982	Seewoosagur; Ramgoolam	PTr–RPL–GF	357,385	24.84		2 / 66	▼26	2nd	Opposition
1983	Satcam Boolell	PTr–MSM–PMSD	575,996	24.84	15	9 / 70	▲7	▼3rd	Opposition
1987	Satcam Boolell	PTr–MSM–PMSD	675,757	40.50	19	9 / 70	Steady	3rd	Coalition
1991	Navin Ramgoolam	PTr–PMSD	670,631	39.30		6 / 66	▼3	3rd	Opposition
1995	Navin Ramgoolam	PTr–MMM	1,084,236	65.17	35	35 / 66	▲32	▲1st	Coalition
2000	Navin Ramgoolam	PTr–PMXD–MMMSM–RPR	672,336	36.27	47	8 / 70	▼27	▼3rd	Opposition
2005	Navin Ramgoolam	PTr–PMXD–MSD–VF–MR–MMSM	948,756	48.38	41	32 / 70	▲24	▲1st	Coalition
2010	Navin Ramgoolam	PTr–MSM–PMSD	1,001,903	49.69	35	28 / 69	▼4	1st	Coalition
2014	Navin Ramgoolam	PTr–MMM	785,645	38.51	30	4 / 69	▼24	▼5th	Opposition
2019	Navin Ramgoolam	PTr–PMSD–MJCB	699,807	32.76	46	12 / 70	▲8	▲2nd	Opposition
2024	Navin Ramgoolam	PTr–MMM–ND–ReA	1,438,333	61.38	35	35 / 66	▲23	▲1st	Coalition

== See also ==
- Official website (in French)
