= List of heads of state of Mauritius =

This is a list of heads of state of Mauritius since the independence of Mauritius in 1968.

From 1968 to 1992 the head of state under the Mauritius Independence Act 1968 was the queen of Mauritius, Elizabeth II, who was also the monarch of the United Kingdom and the other Commonwealth realms. The queen was represented in Mauritius by a governor-general. Mauritius became a republic under the Constitution of 1992 and the monarch and governor-general were replaced by a ceremonial president.

In 1992, Mauritius became a republic within the Commonwealth of Nations. Queen Elizabeth II ceased to be head of state, Queen of Mauritius; the last governor-general, Sir Veerasamy Ringadoo, was appointed the first president of Mauritius. The president is elected by the National Assembly for a five-year term. In the event of a vacancy the vice-president of Mauritius serves as acting head of state.

== Monarchy (1968–1992) ==
The succession to the throne was the same as the succession to the British throne.

No.	Portrait	Name (Birth–Death)	Reign			Royal House	Prime minister
No.	Portrait	Name (Birth–Death)	Reign start	Reign end	Duration	Royal House	Prime minister
1		Queen Elizabeth II (1926–2022)	12 March 1968	12 March 1992	24 years	Windsor	Sir Seewoosagur Ramgoolam; Sir Anerood Jugnauth

=== Governors-general (1968–1992) ===
The governor-general was the representative of the monarch in Mauritius and exercised most of the powers of the monarch. The governor-general was appointed for an indefinite term, serving at the pleasure of the monarch. After the passage of the Statute of Westminster 1931, the governor-general was appointed solely on the advice of the Cabinet of Mauritius without the involvement of the British government. In the event of a vacancy the chief justice served as Officer Administering the Government.

== Republic (1992–present) ==
Under the 1992 constitution, the constitution of the Republic of Mauritius, the president replaced the monarch as ceremonial head of state. The president was elected by the National Assembly for a five-year term. In the event of a vacancy the vice president served as acting president.

Political parties

Labour Party (PTr)
Mauritian Militant Movement (MMM)
Militant Socialist Movement (MSM)

Other factions

Independent

Status

Denotes acting president

No.	Portrait	Name (Birth–Death)	Elected	Term of office			Political party	Prime minister
No.	Portrait	Name (Birth–Death)	Elected	Took office	Left office	Time in office	Political party	Prime minister
1		Sir Veerasamy Ringadoo (1920–2000)	1992	12 March 1992	30 June 1992	110 days	PTr	A. Jugnauth
2		Cassam Uteem (born 1941)	1992; 1997	30 June 1992	15 February 2002	9 years, 230 days	MMM	A. Jugnauth
2		Cassam Uteem (born 1941)	1992; 1997	30 June 1992	15 February 2002	9 years, 230 days	MMM	N. Ramgoolam
2		Cassam Uteem (born 1941)	1992; 1997	30 June 1992	15 February 2002	9 years, 230 days	MMM	A. Jugnauth
—		Angidi Chettiar (1928–2010)	—	15 February 2002	18 February 2002	3 days	PTr	A. Jugnauth
—		Ariranga Pillay (1945–2023)	—	18 February 2002	25 February 2002	7 days	Non-partisan^{1}	A. Jugnauth
3		Karl Offmann (1940–2022)	2002	25 February 2002	1 October 2003	1 year, 218 days	MSM	A. Jugnauth
—		Raouf Bundhun (born 1937)	—	1 October 2003	7 October 2003	6 days	MMM	Bérenger
4		Sir Anerood Jugnauth (1930–2021)	2003; 2008	7 October 2003	31 March 2012	8 years, 176 days	MSM	Bérenger
4		Sir Anerood Jugnauth (1930–2021)	2003; 2008	7 October 2003	31 March 2012	8 years, 176 days	MSM	N. Ramgoolam
—		Monique Ohsan Bellepeau (born 1942)	—	31 March 2012	21 July 2012	112 days	PTr	N. Ramgoolam
5		Kailash Purryag (1947–2025)	2012	21 July 2012	29 May 2015	2 years, 312 days	PTr	N. Ramgoolam
5		Kailash Purryag (1947–2025)	2012	21 July 2012	29 May 2015	2 years, 312 days	PTr	A. Jugnauth
—		Monique Ohsan Bellepeau (born 1942)	—	29 May 2015	5 June 2015	7 days	PTr	A. Jugnauth
6		Ameenah Gurib-Fakim (born 1959)	2015	5 June 2015	23 March 2018	2 years, 291 days	Independent	A. Jugnauth
6		Ameenah Gurib-Fakim (born 1959)	2015	5 June 2015	23 March 2018	2 years, 291 days	Independent	P. Jugnauth
—		Barlen Vyapoory (born 1945/46)	—	23 March 2018	26 November 2019	1 year, 248 days	MSM	P. Jugnauth
—		Eddy Balancy (born 1953)	—	26 November 2019	2 December 2019	6 days	Non-partisan^{1}	P. Jugnauth
7		Prithvirajsing Roopun (born 1959)	2019	2 December 2019	6 December 2024	5 years, 4 days	MSM	P. Jugnauth
7		Prithvirajsing Roopun (born 1959)	2019	2 December 2019	6 December 2024	5 years, 4 days	MSM	N. Ramgoolam
8		Dharam Gokhool (born 1949)	2024	6 December 2024	Incumbent	1 year, 319 days	PTr	N. Ramgoolam

=== Notes ===
1. Served as Chief Justice of Mauritius.

=== Rank by time in office ===
Rank	President	Took office	Left office	Time in office
1	Cassam Uteem	30 June 1992	15 February 2002	9 years, 230 days
2	Sir Anerood Jugnauth	7 October 2003	31 March 2012	8 years, 176 days
3	Prithvirajsing Roopun	2 December 2019	6 December 2024	5 years, 4 days
4	Rajkeswur Purryag	21 July 2012	29 May 2015	2 years, 312 days
5	Ameenah Gurib-Fakim	5 June 2025	23 March 2018	2 years, 291 days
6	Karl Offmann	25 February 2002	1 October 2003	1 year, 218 days
7	Dharam Gokhool	6 December 2024	Incumbent	1 year, 319 days
8	Veerasamy Ringadoo	12 March 1992	30 June 1992	110 days

== See also ==
- List of prime ministers of Mauritius
- Prime Minister of Mauritius
- Spouse of the prime minister of Mauritius
- President of Mauritius
