= State House, Mauritius =

Official residence of the President of Mauritius

Coordinates: 20.229°S 57.487°E

The State House
- Le Chateau de Réduit
- Interactive map of the The State House area

General information
- Architectural style: Old Palace; Old Mansion
- Location: Réduit, Moka, Mauritius
- Construction started: July 1748

Technical details
- Size: 97 ha (240 acres)
- Floor area: 5,100 m^{2} (55,000 sq ft)

Design and construction
- Architect: Pierre Félix Barthelemy David

The State House (French: Le Château de Réduit) is the official residence of the President of Mauritius. Originally Le Réduit, it was built as a fortress for defence by Pierre Félix Barthelemy David in 1749. The mansion is in Réduit, Moka, near the University of Mauritius, close to the Plaines Wilhems District. Its incumbent is Dharam Gokhool. It used to serve as residence for Governors of Mauritius. It is built on 97 hectares (240 acres) of land. The Château has a garden where a multitude of flowers grow, as well as exotic and native trees. The château is open to the public two days a year, in October and March. The house was destroyed by a cyclone, rebuilt, and has been renovated since.

== History ==
=== Construction and French rule ===
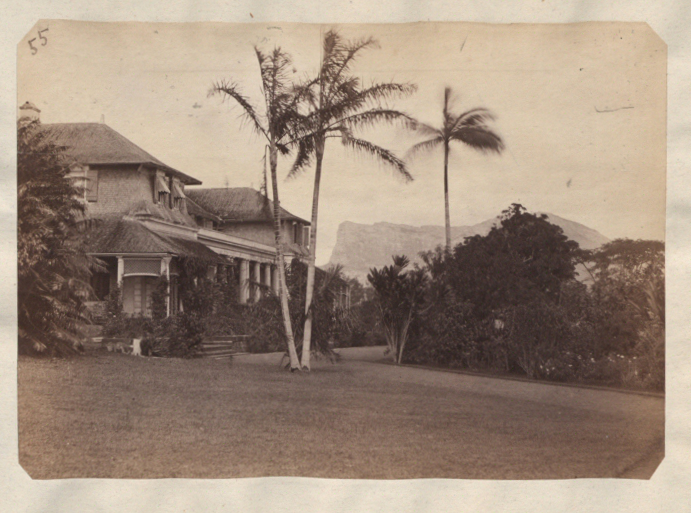
Le Réduit, circa 1880s-1890s

Pierre Félix Barthelemy David, successor of Bertrand Mahé de Labourdonnais, took office as Governor of the Isle de France on 8 October 1746 during a time of Anglo-French rivalry for colonial possessions in the Indian Ocean. His main goal was to take measures to fortify the island against an enemy attack. In a letter dated 28 March 1748, addressed to the management of the "Compagnie des Indes", he expressed his fears and anxiety to find a place in the interior of the island where access would be difficult and where a fortress could be built. This would protect women and valuables.

The Governor went into action before even receiving a reply from the authorities as he considered it necessary for the fortress to be completed quickly. David settled on an ideal site – a spur in the Moka Range, triangular in shape between steep gorges of the rivers Profonde and Cascade. However, in July 1748, Edward Boscawen, an English vice-admiral commanding an English fleet, approached Mauritius with intentions to take possession of it. He retreated because of French cannons situated at Petite Rivière. The French Company finally authorised David's project, aware of the attack. Under the direction of David, his "Le Réduit", a small fortress with battlements and a drawbridge, was completed in 1749. In 1754, one of the directors of the "Compagnie des Indes", Mr. Godeheu d'Igoville had doubted that Le Réduit would be able to withstand sustained attacks, although he admired David's work.

Under the administration of his successor, Jean Baptiste Charles de Lozier-Bouvet, botanist Jean-Baptiste Christophe Fusée-Aublet created the French garden of Le Réduit and later introduced many rare plants from America, Asia and Europe. Pepper plants and cinnamon trees were added by Antoine Marie Desforges-Boucher, last governor of the "Compagnie des Indes".

The Island became the property of France in 1764 and Le Réduit became the official residence of the governors, the first of whom was Jean Daniel Dumas. Despite many modifications made during the period 1764–1778 the Château was in ruins in 1778 due to white ants. Antoine de Guiran La Brillane, then governor, started reconstruction which was completed that year. A year later, on 28 April 1779, La Brillane died in Le Réduit. An inscription dated 1778 on the main door commemorates the reconstruction.

Successive governors followed La Brillane until 1810, when the English took possession of the island. The last French governor was Charles Mathieu Isidore Decaen. The First English Governor was Sir Robert Townsend Farquhar. Under the rule of Sir Robert, two botanists, Boyer and Helsenberg, explored Madagascar and the African coasts in search of rare plants for the gardens.

=== British rule ===
Under the British rule, many modifications were brought to the Château. It needed extensive repairs after damage caused to it by cyclones in 1868 and 1892. The Château was saved from complete destruction during the cyclone in 1892 by the efforts of Governor Sir Henry Jerningham and his assistants. Sir Hesketh Bell was known to have taken an interest in the gardens of Le Réduit. He created an islet in the middle of the lake, linked by a bridge. He also installed a fountain on the north side of the Château. He also introduced many plants from Kew Gardens, London, and other plants from Ceylon.

In 1921, he constructed a memorial named "Le Temple de l'Amour" in Pierre Félix Barthelemy David's memory. This is situated near the ornamental lake at the end of the garden called "Bout du Monde" – from where one can see below the confluence of the rivers Profonde and Cascade. There is a marble inscription on the floor of the memorial which reads:

"TO M. BARTHELEMY DAVID / Gouverneur de l'Isle de France 1746 / the creator of Le Réduit / his Grateful Successors"

=== Independence ===
On 12 March 1968 Mauritius achieved independence and Sir John Shaw Rennie became the first Governor-General. In September 1968, Sir Arthur Leonard Williams succeeded Sir John. Sir Arthur died on 27 December 1972 and was buried in the cemetery of St. John, situated in the proximity of the Château. In 1972 Her Majesty Queen Elizabeth II appointed Sir Raman Osman as the first Mauritian Governor-General. Sir Raman retired on 31 October 1977. Since this date, the office of Governor-General was held in an acting capacity by Sir Henry Garrioch, Sir Dayendranath Burrenchobay, Sir Seewoosagur Ramgoolam, and Sir Veerasamy Ringadoo in January 1986.

== List of occupants ==
Occupant	From
Sir Veerasamy Ringadoo	12 March – 30 June 1992
Cassam Uteem	30 June 1992 – 15 February 2002
Angidi Chettiar (acting)	15 February 2002 – 18 February 2002
Ariranga Pillay (acting)	18 February 2002 – 25 February 2002
Karl Offmann	25 February 2002 – 1 October 2003
Sir Anerood Jugnauth	7 October 2003 – March 2012
Kailash Purryag	21 July 2012 – 29 May 2015
Dr. Ameenah Gurib	5 June 2015 – 23 March 2018
Prithvirajsing Roopun	2 December 2019 – 2 December 2024
Prithvirajsing Roopun (acting)	2 December 2024 — 6 December 2024
Dharambeer Gokhool	6 December 2024 — Present

== See also ==
- List of governors of Isle de France (Mauritius), 1735-1810
- List of governors of British Mauritius, 1810-1968
- Governor-General of Mauritius (has a section with a list)
- List of presidents of Mauritius
