= Kailash Purryag =

President of Mauritius from 2012 to 2015 (1947–2025)

The Honourable Kailash Purryag GCSK
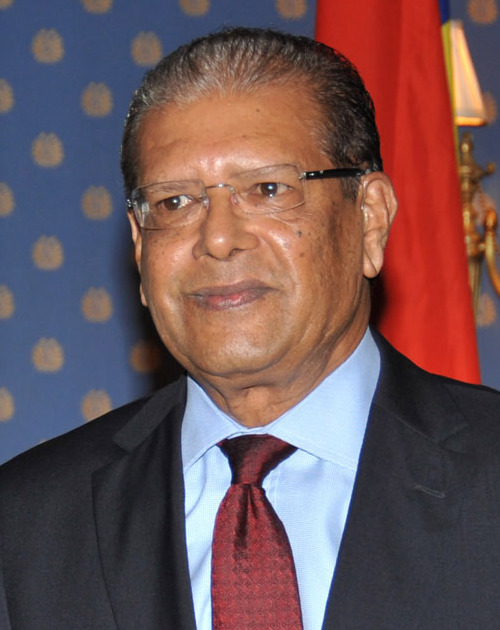
- Purryag in 2013

President of Mauritius
- In office 21 July 2012 – 29 May 2015
- Prime Minister: Navin Ramgoolam; Anerood Jugnauth
- Vice President: Monique Ohsan Bellepeau
- Preceded by: Monique Ohsan Bellepeau (acting)
- Succeeded by: Monique Ohsan Bellepeau (acting)

Speaker of the National Assembly
- In office 12 July 2005 – 23 July 2012
- Deputy: Jean-François Chaumière; Étienne Sinatambou; Prithvirajsing Roopun; Pradeep Peetumber
- Preceded by: Dev Ramnah
- Succeeded by: Razack Peeroo

Deputy Prime Minister of Mauritius
- In office 2 July 1997 – 17 September 2000
- Prime Minister: Navin Ramgoolam
- Preceded by: Paul Bérenger
- Succeeded by: Paul Bérenger
Parliamentary offices
Member of Parliament; for La Cavèrne and Phoenix
In office 20 December 1995 – 11 August 2000
Preceded by	Showkutally Soodhun
Succeeded by	Showkutally Soodhun
In office 26 December 1976 – 17 December 1981
Preceded by	Mohun Persad Kisnah
Succeeded by	Uttam Jawaheer
Member of Parliament; for Curepipe and Midlands
In office 6 September 1983 – 3 July 1987
Preceded by	Karl Offmann
Succeeded by	Hervé Duval

Personal details
- Born: Rajkeswur Purryag; 12 December 1947 Camp Fouquereaux, British Mauritius
- Died: 21 June 2025 (aged 77)
- Party: Labour Party (1973–2025)
- Spouse: Aneetah Purryag (1973–2025)
- Children: 1
- Occupation: Politician
- Profession: Law attorney

Rajkeswur Purryag, GCSK (12 December 1947 – 21 June 2025), also known as Kailash Purryag, was a Mauritian politician who served as the fifth president of Mauritius from July 2012 to May 2015. He was elected president of Mauritius by the National Assembly and took office on 21 July 2012. He succeeded Sir Anerood Jugnauth, who spent nine years as president from 2003 until resigning in March 2012. Kailash Purryag previously served as Member of Parliament, Minister and Speaker of the National Assembly; he made his debut in the political arena at an early age in 1976.

== Early life and background ==
Rajkeswur Purryag, better known as Kailash, was born on 12 December 1947 in Camp Fouquereaux, Phoenix, Mauritius. He was a Bihari Mauritian and his ancestors originated from the Indian state of Bihar. His ancestry is traced from a Nonia caste family of Bihar. He attended the Shree Shamboonath Government School and later the Mauritius College. He was sworn in as attorney-at-law in 1973. The same year, he joined the Mauritian Labour Party. He became general secretary of the party in 1984 and president in 1995.

== Political career ==
Kailash Purryag became a member of the Labour Party in 1973. He was a member of the Municipal Commission of the Municipal Council of Vacoas-Phoenix from 1974 to 1976. Purryag was elected member of the Legislative Assembly for the first time at the 1976 elections held on 20 December 1976 as one of the three members for Constituency No. 15 (La Caverne & Phoenix) of the Independence Party (coalition of Labour & CAM). Purryag became Minister of Social Security from January 1980 to June 1982. In 1981, he was appointed Leader of Delegation by the Government to negotiate adequate compensation for the Ilois Community in 1981 from the British Government.

At the 1982 elections, Purryag was not elected when he stood as candidate of the Parti de l'Alliance Nationale (Labour-CAM-PMSD) at Constituency No.15 (La Caverne-Phoenix). He was defeated by the MMM-PSM candidates Peerthum, Juwaheer and Maudarbocus.

As a candidate of PMSD in Constituency No.17 (Curepipe-Midlands) at the 1983 elections, he was elected Member of the Legislative Assembly. As the PMSD joined forces with the victorious MSM-Labour coalition after the 1983 elections, Purryag became Minister of Health from January 1984 to January 1986.

Purryag was not a candidate at the 1987 elections and at the 1991 elections he was not elected when he stood as PMSD-Labour candidate in Constituency No.6. He served as Secretary General of the Labour Party from 1987 to 1991 and became President of the Party from March 1991 to March 1996.

Purryag was elected Member of the National Assembly at the 1995 general elections as a candidate of the Labour-MMM coalition. He became Minister of Economic Planning, Information & Telecommunications from December 1995 to July 1997. He was appointed Deputy Prime Minister and Minister of Foreign Affairs & International Trade from July 1997 to September 2000.

At the 2000 general election, Kailash Purryag (Labour-PMXD) was defeated at Constituency No. 11 Vieux Grand Port and Rose Belle by Pravind Jugnauth and Rajesh Bhowon of the MSM-MMM coalition.

Although he did not take an active part in the 2005 and 2010 general elections Purryag was nominated in July 2005 and in May 2010 as Speaker of the National Assembly. He remained there until 2012. On Friday 20 July 2012, the Clerk of the National Assembly of Mauritius informed the House that, immediately following his election as President of the Republic at to-day's sitting, the Honourable Rajkeswur Purryag, GCSK, GOSK, has submitted his resignation as Speaker of the National Assembly.

== President ==
As stated on the Section 28 (2) (a) of the Constitution of Mauritius, the President shall be elected by the Assembly on a motion made by the Prime Minister and supported by the votes of a majority of all the Members of the Assembly. On 20 July 2012, the National Assembly elected Rajkeswur Purryag as President of Mauritius. The motion was presented by Prime Minister Navin Ramgoolam and seconded by Rashid Beebeejaun. Kailash Purryag became the fifth President of Mauritius and took office on 21 July 2012. His first official visit was at the Sir Seewoosagur Ramgoolam Botanical Garden, where he meditated at the monument of Sir Seewoosagur Ramgoolam, the father of the nation.

Following the victory of the MSM/PSMD/ML alliance led by Sir Anerood Jugnauth in December 2014, he was expected to resign to make way for the alliance's candidate, Ameenah Gurib-Fakim, to assume the Presidency instead. In an official communique from the State House, he confirmed that he made an agreement with Jugnauth to remain as President up to May 2015 to ensure the hand over of power from the Ramgoolam administration to the new government in a climate of stability. He eventually resigned on 29 May 2015. Before the 2024 Mauritian general election, he was supposed to be President of Mauritius but sided with Pravind Jugnauth and as Pravind lost the elections, another president, Dharam Gokhool, was elected.

Presidential styles of Kailash Purryag 2012 to 2015
- Reference style: His Excellency, Mr. Kailash Purryag, President of the Republic of Mauritius
- Spoken style: President Purryag
- Alternative style: Mr. President

== Personal life and death ==
Kailash Purryag was living at Camp Fouquereaux, Curepipe before he became president. He was the eldest of a family with nine children. He married Aneetah Purryag on 8 December 1973 and he had a daughter and two grandchildren. During a state visit to India in January 2013, Purryag visited the village of his forefathers in Bajeetpore, Patna. His great grandfather Purryag 338493 sailed to Mauritius in 1869 to work as indentured labourer or Coolie.

Purryag died on 21 June 2025, at the age of 77.

== Honours ==
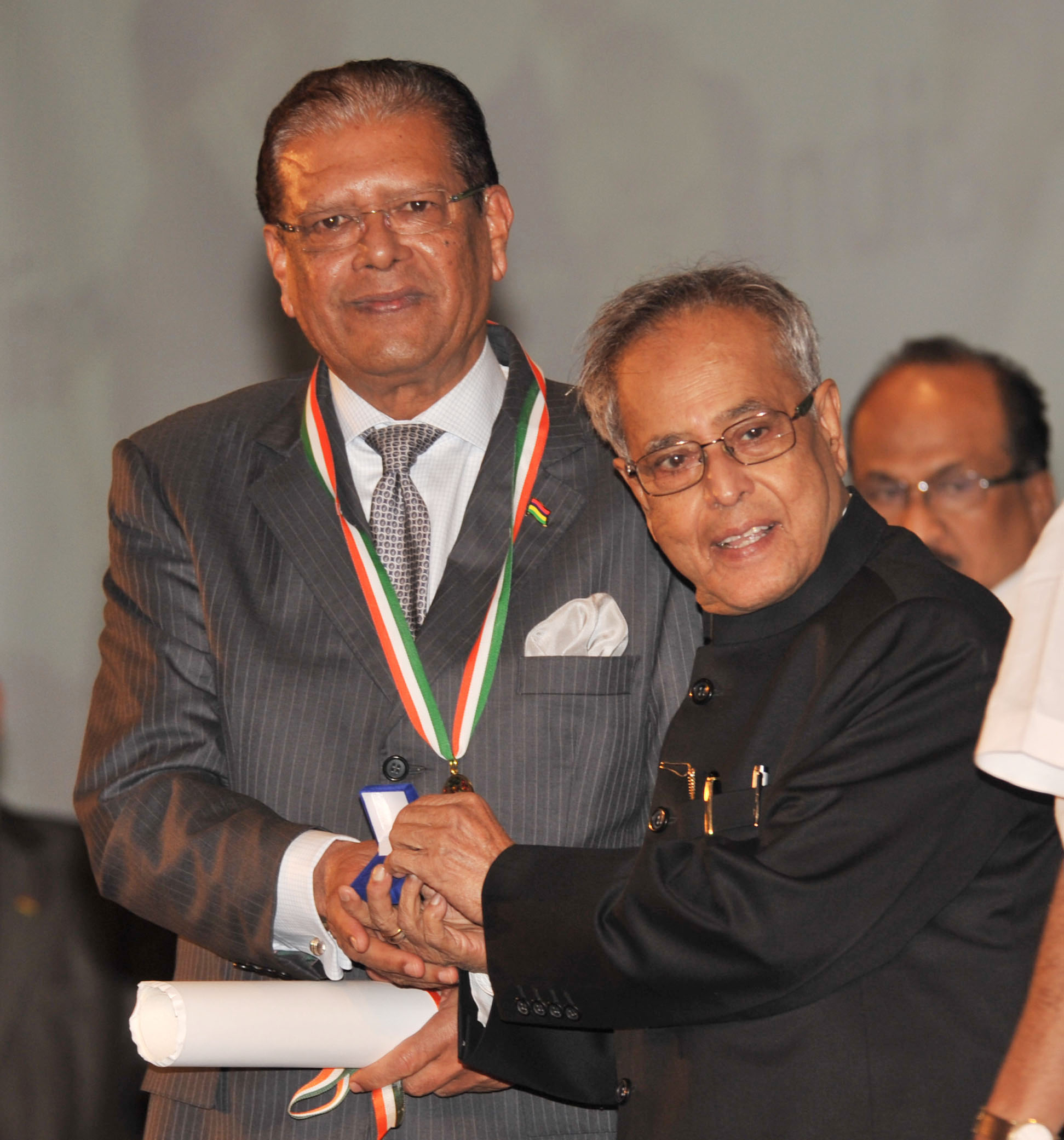
Purryag receives Pravasi Bharatiya Samman from the President of India Pranab Mukherjee in 2013

=== National honours ===
- Order of the Star and Key of the Indian Ocean, Grand Cross
- Order of the Star and Key of the Indian Ocean, Grand Commander

=== Foreign honours ===
  (India)
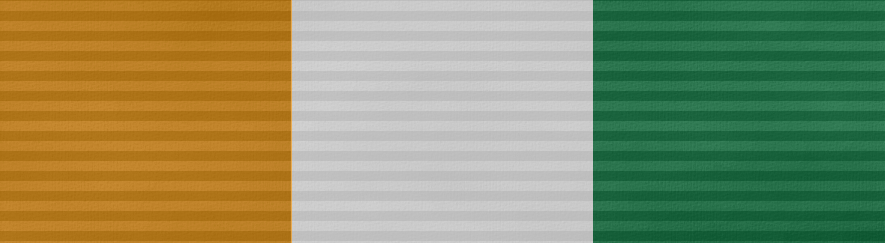
  - Pravasi Bharatiya Samman

Purryag was recipient of both highest order merits in Mauritius. He was elevated as Grand Officer of the Order of the Star and Key of the Indian Ocean (GOSK) on 12 March 1998 and Grand Commander of the Order of the Star and Key of the Indian Ocean (GCSK) on 12 March 2009. He received the Conferment of Honorary Freedom of the City of Port Louis on 23 August 2007. On 9 January 2013, Purryag received the Pravasi Bharatiya Samman, the highest honour conferred to overseas Indians at the 13th Pravasi Bharatiya Divas.

== See also ==
- List of presidents of Mauritius
- First Lady of Mauritius
- Vice-President of Mauritius
- Prime Minister of Mauritius

Political offices
Preceded by Prem Nababsing	Deputy Prime Minister of Mauritius; 1997–2000	Succeeded by Paul Berenger
Preceded by Prem Ramnah	Speaker of the National Assembly; 2005–2012	Succeeded by Razack Peeroo
Preceded by Monique Ohsan Bellepeau; Acting	President of Mauritius; 2012–2015	Succeeded by Monique Ohsan Bellepeau; Acting
