= Eddy Balancy =

Acting President of Mauritius in 2019

Acting President of Mauritius
- In office 26 November 2019 – 2 December 2019
- Prime Minister: Pravind Jugnauth
- Preceded by: Barlen Vyapoory (acting)
- Succeeded by: Prithvirajsing Roopun

Chief Justice of Mauritius
- In office 26 March 2019 – 5 May 2020
- Preceded by: Kheshoe Parsad Matadeen
- Succeeded by: Ashraf Caunhye

Personal details
- Born: Marc France Edouard Balancy; 6 May 1953 (age 73) Mauritius Island, Mauritius
- Party: Independent
- Education: King's College London; Brunel University of London
- Occupation: Politician; attorney general

Marc France Edouard "Eddy" Balancy (born 6 May 1953) is the former Chief Justice of Mauritius. In this function he served as acting president of Mauritius between 26 November and 2 December 2019 as per the Constitution of Mauritius.

He was educated at Royal College Port Louis, King's College London (LLB, 1976) and Brunel University of London (MA sociology and law, 1978).

Barlen Vyapoory, who had been carrying out this duty in acting capacity and had been the vice president since 2016, assumed the duty temporarily on 23 March 2018 after the resignation of the then-president Ameenah Gurib-Fakim, but with the statement he made on 26 November 2019, he announced his resignation. Balancy, who served as the Chief Justice after this development, was temporarily appointed to this office until the new president was elected. Balancy held this post until 2 December, when the National Assembly appointed Prithvirajsing Roopun to the Presidency.
