= Coat of arms of Mauritius =

National coat of arms of the Republic of Mauritius

Coat of Arms of the Republic of Mauritius

Versions
- Greater coat of arms
- Armiger: Republic of Mauritius (middle); Dharam Gokhool, President of Mauritius (greater)
- Adopted: 1906
- Shield: Quarterly azure and or: (1) A lymphad or; (2) 3 palm trees vert; (3) A key in pale the wards downwards gules; (4) From the base a pile, and in chief a mullet argent
- Supporters: On the dexter side, a dodo per bend sinister embattled gules and argent and on the sinister side, a sambur deer per bend embattled argent and gules, each supporting a sugar cane erect proper
- Motto: Stella Clavisque Maris Indici "Star and Key of the Indian Ocean"
- Earlier version(s): British Mauritius
- Use: 1869–1906

The current coat of arms of Mauritius was officially granted on 25th of August, 1906 by a royal warrant from King Edward VII to the British Crown colony of Mauritius. It was designed to represent key aspects of the island's identity, including its maritime position, agricultural economy, and biodiversity. The arms remained unchanged after Mauritius attained independence from the United Kingdom on the 12th of March, 1968, and were later reaffirmed when the country became a republic on the 12th of March, 1992. and according to the Mauritius Laws 1990, Vol. 2, Schedule (Section 2), the coat of arms remains the official national emblem, with its heraldic description and color specifications formally codified and standardized in legislation.

== Heraldic Description (Blazon) ==
=== Shield (Escutcheon) ===
The shield is divided quarterly per pale azure (blue) and or (gold), with each quarter bearing a distinct symbol that represents a significant aspect of Mauritius's historical, geographical, or economic identity:

==== First Quarter (top left) ====
Depicts a lymphad (a single-masted medieval galley) in gold (or) set against a blue (azure) background. This ship symbolizes Mauritius's maritime history, referencing the succession of European colonial powers of Portugal, the Netherlands, France, and Great Britain that navigated the Indian Ocean and established settlements on the island.

==== Second Quarter (top right) ====
Features three palm trees in green (vert) positioned upright on a gold (or) field. These palms represent the island's tropical vegetation, a defining feature of its ecology, as well as its three main outer dependencies: Rodrigues, Agaléga Islands, and the Cargados Carajos Shoals (also known as the Saint Brandon islands).

==== Third Quarter (bottom left) ====
Displays a red key (gules) with its wards pointing downward on a gold (or) background. The key is a direct symbol of strategic control over maritime access in the southwest Indian Ocean, identifying Mauritius as the literal and symbolic “key to the Indian Ocean,” a phrase later reflected in the national motto.

==== Fourth Quarter (bottom right) ====
Shows a silver pile (argent) issuing upward from the base of a blue (azure) field, topped with a silver mullet (a five-pointed star). This composition represents Mauritius's guiding role as a navigational and geographic beacon, frequently referred to as the “Star of the Indian Ocean” due to its prominent location along historic sea routes.

=== Supporters ===
==== Dexter (left side of the shield) ====
A dodo (Raphus cucullatus) depicted per bend sinister embattled in gules (red) and argent (silver). This bird, once endemic to Mauritius and extinct since the late 17th century, symbolizes the fragility of unique island species and the importance of conservation effort.

==== Sinister (right side of the shield) ====
A sambar deer (Rusa unicolor), shown per bend embattled in argent and gules, represents the extant wildlife of Mauritius. As an introduced species, it acknowledges the island's ecological evolution and biodiversity which is distinct from its original fauna.

Both supporters each hold a sugar cane stalk proper, reflecting the historical and economic significance of sugar cultivation in Mauritius.

=== Motto ===
The national motto of Mauritius appears on a scroll below the shield and supporters:

"Stella Clavisque Maris Indici", a Latin phrase that translates to "Star and Key of the Indian Ocean."

The motto reinforces the visual symbolism found in the fourth and third quarters of the shield, the mullet (star) and the key and underscores Mauritius's geopolitical importance as a historical hub in Indian Ocean trade routes.

This phrase has also influenced the naming of the Order of the Star and Key of the Indian Ocean (GCSK), Mauritius's highest civilian honor, instituted in 1992.

== Color code ==
- Azure – Royal Blue (Pantone Reflex Blue)
- Or – Gold (Metallic Gold)
- Vert – Emerald Green (Pantone Green)
- Gules – Warm Red (Pantone 2X)
- Argent – Silver (Metallic Silver)

== Usage ==
- The national coat of arms appears on Mauritian banknotes and coins, typically in the lower-left corner, for example, the Rs 25–200 notes from the Bank of Mauritius feature the emblem as a security and identity feature.
- It is also prominently featured on official documents, national buildings such as the State House, and seals of government ministries.
- During British rule, the emblem was also displayed on colonial flags, such as the British Blue Ensign, between 1906 and 1968. The 1923 update saw removal of a white roundel from the ensign.
