= 2024 Mauritian presidential election =

| ← 2019 | 6 December 2024 | 2029 → |
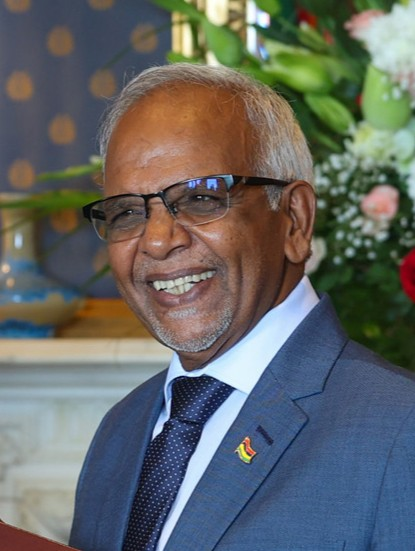
| Nominee | Dharam Gokhool |
| Party | Labour Party |
| Electoral vote | Unanimous |
President before election
Prithvirajsing Roopun
Independent
Elected President
Dharam Gokhool
Labour Party

A presidential election was held in Mauritius on 7 December 2024 to elect the next president.

Former minister of education and professor at the University of Mauritius, Dharam Gokhool was uninamously elected without contest to serve a five-year term. During the same session, Robert Hungley was elected vice-president.

== Electoral process ==
The president of Mauritius is elected indirectly by the state's parliament, the National Assembly.
