= Ameenah Gurib-Fakim =

Scientist and president of Mauritius

Ameenah Gurib-Fakim GCSK
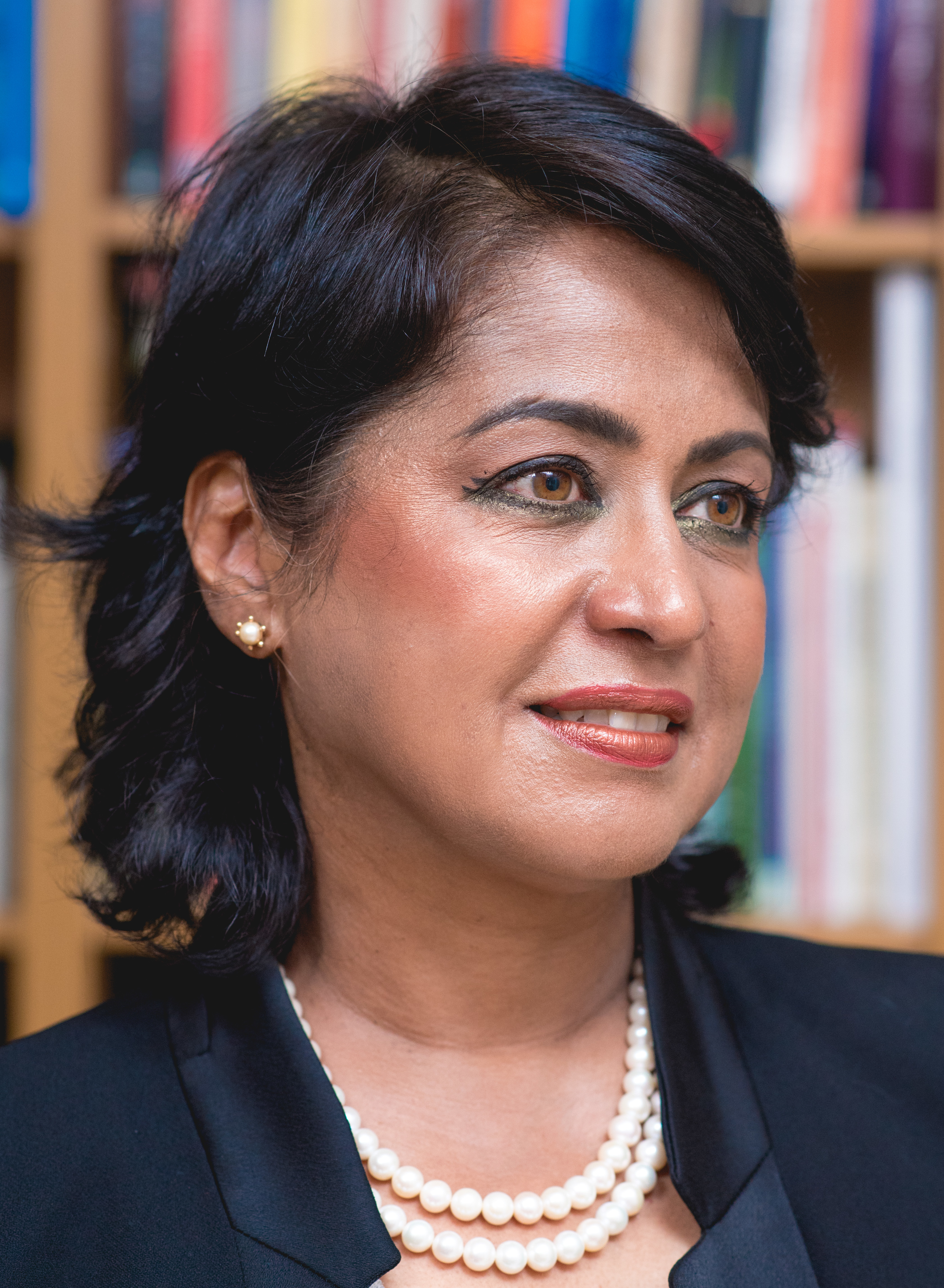
- Gurib-Fakim in 2018

President of Mauritius
- In office 5 June 2015 – 23 March 2018
- Prime Minister: Anerood Jugnauth; Pravind Jugnauth
- Vice President: Monique Ohsan Bellepeau; Barlen Vyapoory
- Preceded by: Monique Ohsan Bellepeau (acting)
- Succeeded by: Barlen Vyapoory (acting)

Personal details
- Born: 17 October 1959 (age 67) Surinam, British Mauritius
- Party: Independent
- Spouse: Anwar Fakim (m. 1988)
- Children: 2
- Parent(s): Hassenjee Gurib; Firdaus Durgauhee
- Education: University of Surrey; University of Exeter
- Profession: Politician; biodiversity scientist

Dr. Bibi Ameenah Firdaus Gurib-Fakim (Mauritian Creole pronunciation: [bibi amina fiːədos ɡəʁib fakim]) GCSK (born 17 October 1959) is a Mauritian politician and biodiversity scientist who served as the sixth president of Mauritius from 2015 to 2018. In December 2014, she was selected to be the presidential candidate of the Alliance Lepep. After Kailash Purryag resigned on 29 May 2015, both Prime Minister Sir Anerood Jugnauth and Leader of the Opposition Paul Berenger positively welcomed her nomination, which was unanimously approved in a vote in the National Assembly.

Gurib-Fakim is the first woman elected as president of the country and is the third woman to have served as Head of State following Queen Elizabeth II and Monique Ohsan Bellepeau, who preceded her in this office and was her first Vice President. She served as a 2019 keynote speaker of Cambridge University's conference "Africa Together: Which Way Forward?" hosted by the African Society of Cambridge University.

Since March 2026, she has served as Chair of the Supervisory Board of the Global Center on Adaptation.

== Early life and education ==
Bibi Ameenah Firdaus Gurib-Fakim was born in the village of Surinam on 17 October 1959, to parents Hassenjee Gurib and Firdaus Durgauhee. She grew up in Plaine Magnien and completed her studies at the primary school in Saint-Patrice. She then moved to Mahébourg Loreto Convent, finishing her Higher School Certificate at Loreto Convent Quatre Bornes before flying to England for her undergraduate degree in chemistry. She graduated from the University of Surrey in 1983 with a BSc degree in chemistry. After obtaining her PhD degree in organic chemistry at Exeter University, she returned home in 1987 to take employment at the University of Mauritius.

== Career ==
=== Academic and scientific career ===
Gurib-Fakim worked at the Mauritius Research Council as Manager for Research from 1995 to 1997. She later became Professor of Organic Chemistry at the University of Mauritius, where she served successively as Dean of the Faculty of Science and Pro-Vice-Chancellor (2004–2010). She also served as Chairperson of the International Council for Scientific Union – Regional Office for Africa from 2011 to 2014.

Before her presidency, she was Managing Director of CIDP Research & Innovation (formerly Cephyr, Centre for Phytotherapy Research).

In December 2013, Gurib-Fakim made a complaint to the Mauritian Equal Opportunities Commission (EOC), alleging religious discrimination in the consideration of her application for Vice-Chancellor of the University of Mauritius. The EOC investigation found that this was not the case, but noted shortcomings in the selection process, including the lack of clear criteria and mark sheets for evaluating candidates.

=== Presidency of Mauritius ===
In 2015, her nomination for the presidency of Mauritius, put forward by then prime minister and fellow Militant Socialist Movement member Anerood Jugnauth, was unanimously approved by the Mauritian National Assembly. She resigned in 2018 amid a financial scandal during the prime ministership of Pravind Jugnauth. The office of president remained vacant until December 2019, when Prithvirajsing Roopun took office. In the meantime, Vice-President Barlen Vyapoory served as acting president.

=== Post-presidency ===
In March 2026, Gurib-Fakim was appointed Chair of the Supervisory Board of the Global Center on Adaptation, succeeding Macky Sall after he stepped down following the submission of his candidacy for Secretary-General of the United Nations. The organization also announced that Rindra Rabarinirinarison would become its new chief executive officer, while founding chair Ban Ki-moon would conclude his tenure and assume the role of GCA Chair Emeritus.

== Personal life ==
In 1988, she married Dr. Anwar Fakim who is a surgeon. They have two children; a son (Adam, born in 1992 and studied at the University of Kent) and a daughter (Imaan, who studied Computer Science).

== Controversies ==
Soon after her appointment as President the former Prime Minister Navin Ramgoolam raised concerns about the PhD qualifications of Ameenah Gurib-Fakim. Ramgoolam reiterated his earlier concerns when the Platinum Card Scandal came to light.

Ameenah Gurib-Fakim officially resigned from the position of President of Mauritius on 23 March 2018 after the 50th anniversary of independence celebrations when L'Express newspapers leaked her bank details, although she had refunded the expenditures one year before the leak. This resignation was mainly due to conflicts on interest and allegations arising from her involvement as Vice-Chairperson of the Charitable Organisation Planet Earth Institute (PEI), private expenditures on a credit card and business trips financed by PEI and approved by the Govt. of Mauritius, given the involvement of PEI's controversial founder and businessman Álvaro Sobrinho. Ameenah Gurib Fakim also requested that the Financial Services Commission (FSC) issue a banking license to Álvaro Sobrinho, as Chairperson of PEI to host the PASET Funds.

In June 2018 the Government of Mauritius instigated a Commission of Inquiry on violation of the Constitution and other laws by former President Ameenah Gurib-Fakim, led by Judge Asraf Ally Caunhye. Before resigning from office in 2018, and without consulting the Cabinet of Mauritius, Ameenah Gurib-Fakim had nominated Sir Hamid Moollan to preside an ill-fated Commission of Inquiry on Álvaro Sobrinho's activities. Despite numerous hearings over a period of nearly 3 years the inquiry has not been completed.

== Awards and honours ==
=== Honours ===
==== National honours ====
- Mauritius
  - Grand Commander of the Order of the Star and Key of the Indian Ocean (GCSK)
  - Commander of the Order of the Star and Key of the Indian Ocean(CSK)

==== Foreign honours ====
- France
  - Member of the Order of Academic Palms, 3rd Class (national order)
- (Kingdom of the Two Sicilies) Castroan Royal Family of Two Sicilies
  - Knight Grand Cross of the Royal Order of Francis I (dynastic order)

==== Awards and recognition ====
Gurib-Fakim has also been the recipient of various international awards including the L'Oréal-UNESCO Award for Women in Science (2007), Laureate for the National Economic and Social Council (2007), the CTA / NEPAD / AGRA / RUFORUM for ‘African Women in Science’ and the African Union Award for Women in Science. She was also made Commander of the Order of the Star and Key of the Indian Ocean (CSK) by President Anerood Jugnauth in 2008 for her contribution to the education and the scientific sector. She was awarded the Order of the ‘Chevalier de l’Ordre des Palmes Academiques’ by the Government of France in 2009. Upon becoming President, she was automatically elevated to the highest civilian award of Grand Commander of the Star and Key of the Indian Ocean (GSCK). Gurib-Fakim was listed among the 100 Reputable Africans by Reputation Polls International.

==== National awards ====
- Mauritius: Laureate for the National Economic and Social Council

==== Foreign and international awards ====
- African Union: African Union Award for 'Women in Science' (2009)
- African Union: Laureate for the CTA/NEPAD/AGRA/RUFORUM for 'African Women in Science' (2009)
- France: Honorary Degree of the Pierre and Marie Curie University
- Jordan: Fellow of the Jordanian Islamic Academy of Science
- Nigeria: Fellow of the African Institute of Science and Technology
- UNESCO: Laureate of the L'Oréal-UNESCO Award for Women in Science for Africa
- United Kingdom: Elected Fellow of the Linnean Society of London (2007)
- United Kingdom: In 2024, Ameenah Gurib-Fakim won and accepted the International Women of the Year Award at EPG's 16th Annual Political & Public Life Awards at the House of Commons.

== Bibliography ==
=== Academic works ===
- Aumeeruddy-Elalfi, Z.; Gurib-Fakim, A.; Mahomoodally, F. (2015). "Antimicrobial, antibiotic potentiating activity and phytochemical profile of essential oils from exotic and endemic medicinal plants of Mauritius". Industrial Crops and Products. 71: 197–204. doi:10.1016/j.indcrop.2015.03.058.
- Seebaluck, R.; Gurib-Fakim, A.; Mahomoodally, F. (2015). "Medicinal plants from the genus Acalypha (Euphorbiaceae)–A review of their ethnopharmacology and phytochemistry". Journal of Ethnopharmacology. 159: 137–157. doi:10.1016/j.jep.2014.10.040. PMID 25446604.
- Rangasamy, O.; Mahomoodally, F. M.; Gurib-Fakim, A.; Quetin-Leclercq, J. (2014). "Two anti-staphylococcal triterpenoid acids isolated from Psiloxylon mauritianum (Bouton ex Hook.f.) Baillon, an endemic traditional medicinal plant of Mauritius". South African Journal of Botany. 93: 198–203. Bibcode:2014SAJB...93..198R. doi:10.1016/j.sajb.2014.03.017.
- ElSawy, N. A.; Hadda, T. B.; Bakr, E. H.; Header, E.A.M.; Fakim, A. G.; Mabkhot, Y. N.; Aljofan, M. (2014). "Effects of Crude Aqueous Extract of Origanum vulgaris in Developing Ovary of Rabbits Following in Utero, Adolescent and Postpubertal Exposure". Vedic Research International Phytomedicine. 2 (3): 73. doi:10.14259/pm.v2i3.142. S2CID 87230446.
- Gurib-Fakim, A.; Mahomoodally, M. F. (2013). "African Flora as Potential Sources of Medicinal Plants : Towards the Chemotherapy of Major Parasitic and Other Infectious Diseases : A Review". Jordan Journal of Biological Sciences. 6 (2): 77–84. doi:10.12816/0000263.
- Mahomoodally, F. M.; Subratty, A. H.; Gurib-Fakim, A.; Choudhary, M. I. (2012). "Antioxidant, antiglycation and cytotoxicity evaluation of selected medicinal plants of the Mascarene Islands". BMC Complementary and Alternative Medicine. 12 165. doi:10.1186/1472-6882-12-165. PMC 3517752. PMID 23020844.
- Mahomoodally, F.; Mesaik, A.; Choudhary, M. I.; Subratty, A. H.; Gurib-Fakim, A. (2012). "In vitro modulation of oxidative burst via release of reactive oxygen species from immune cells by extracts of selected tropical medicinal herbs and food plants". Asian Pacific Journal of Tropical Medicine. 5 (6): 440–447. doi:10.1016/S1995-7645(12)60075-3. PMID 22575975.
- Mahomoodally, M. F.; Subratty, A. H.; Gurib-Fakim, A.; Choudhary, M. I.; Khan, S. N. (2012). "Traditional Medicinal Herbs and Food Plants Have the Potential to Inhibit Key Carbohydrate Hydrolyzing Enzymes In Vitro and Reduce Postprandial Blood Glucose Peaks In Vivo". The Scientific World Journal. 2012: 1–9. doi:10.1100/2012/285284. PMC 3361172. PMID 22654584.
- MAHOMOODALLY, M.; GURIB FAKIM, A.; SUBRATTY, A. H. (2012). "Inhibitory Effects of a Traditional Antidiabetic Medicinal Fruit Extract on the Transport of Inorganic Phosphate and D-Glucose Across Rat Everted Intestinal Sacs- Possible Relationship with A "crabtree-Effect"". Journal of Food Biochemistry. 36: 107–115. doi:10.1111/j.1745-4514.2010.00504.x.
- Leyssen, P.; Litaudon, M.; Guillemot, J.; Rasoanaivo, P.; Smadja, J.; Gurib-Fakim, A.; Canard, B.; Guéritte, F. (2011). "PHYTOCHIK: Biodiversity As A Source of Selective Inhibitors of CHIKV Replication". Antiviral Research. 90 (2): A36–A37. doi:10.1016/j.antiviral.2011.03.048.
- Mahomoodally, M. F.; Gurib-Fakim, A.; Subratty, A. H. (2010). "Screening for Alternative Antibiotics: An Investigation into the Antimicrobial Activities of Medicinal Food Plants of Mauritius". Journal of Food Science. 75 (3): M173–M177. doi:10.1111/j.1750-3841.2010.01555.x. PMID 20492307.
- Mahomoodally, M. F.; Gurib-Fakim, A.; Subratty, A. H. "Antimicrobial Activities and Phytochemical Profiles of Endemic Medicinal Plants of Mauritius".
- Gurib-Fakim, A.; Gueho, J.; Sewraj-Bissoondoyal, M. (1997). "The Medicinal Plants of Mauritius – Part 1". Pharmaceutical Biology. 35 (4): 237–254. doi:10.1076/phbi.35.4.237.13313.
- Jelager, L.; Gurib-Fakim, A.; Adsersen, A. (1998). "Antibacterial and Antifungal Activity of Medicinal Plants of Mauritius". Pharmaceutical Biology. 36 (3): 153–161. doi:10.1076/phbi.36.3.153.6345.
- Dutta, A.; Sarkar, D.; Gurib-Fakim, A.; Mandal, C.; Chatterjee, M. (2008). "In vitro and in vivo activity of Aloe vera leaf exudate in experimental visceral leishmaniasis". Parasitology Research. 102 (6): 1235–1242. doi:10.1007/s00436-008-0899-2. PMID 18266009. S2CID 22268593.
- Mahomoodally, M. F.; Gurib-Fakim, A.; Subratty, A. H. (2007). "Effect of exogenous ATP on Momordica charantia Linn. (Cucurbitaceae) induced inhibition of D-glucose, L-tyrosine and fluid transport across rat everted intestinal sacs in vitro". Journal of Ethnopharmacology. 110 (2): 257–263. doi:10.1016/j.jep.2006.09.020. PMID 17092672.
- Rangasamy, O.; Raoelison, G.; Rakotoniriana, F. E.; Cheuk, K.; Urverg-Ratsimamanga, S.; Quetin-Leclercq, J.; Gurib-Fakim, A.; Subratty, A. H. (2007). "Screening for anti-infective properties of several medicinal plants of the Mauritians flora". Journal of Ethnopharmacology. 109 (2): 331–337. doi:10.1016/j.jep.2006.08.002. PMID 17011733.
- Marie, D.; Gurib-Fakim, A.; Gray, A.; Waterman, P. (2006). "Constituents of Psiadia terebinthina AJ Scott, an endemic Asteraceae from Mauritius". Natural Product Research. 20 (13): 1169–1175. doi:10.1080/14786410600898847. PMID 17127504. S2CID 20645650.
- Gurib-Fakim, A. (2006). "Medicinal plants: traditions of yesterday and drugs of tomorrow". Molecular Aspects of Medicine. 27 (1): 1–93. doi:10.1016/j.mam.2005.07.008. PMID 16105678.
- Kotowaroo, M. I.; Mahomoodally, M. F.; Gurib-Fakim, A.; Subratty, A. H. (2006). "Screening of traditional antidiabetic medicinal plants of Mauritius for possible alpha-amylase inhibitory effects in vitro". Phytotherapy Research. 20 (3): 228–231. doi:10.1002/ptr.1839. PMID 16521114. S2CID 24533376.
- Mahomoodally, M. F; Gurib Fakim, A.; Subratty, A. H. (2006). "Stimulatory effects of Antidesma madagascariense on D-glucose, L-tyrosine, fluid and electrolyte transport across rat everted intestine, comparable to insulin action in vitro". British Journal of Biomedical Science. 63 (1): 12–7. doi:10.1080/09674845.2006.11732713. PMID 16613135. S2CID 35440564.
- Subratty, A. H.; Gurib-Fakim, A.; Mahomoodally, F. (2005). "Bitter melon: an exotic vegetable with medicinal values". Nutrition & Food Science. 35 (3): 143–147. doi:10.1108/00346650510594886.
- Mahomoodally, M. F.; Gurib-Fakim, A.; Subratty., A. H. (2005). "Experimental evidence for in vitro fluid transport in the presence of a traditional medicinal fruit extract across rat everted intestinal sacs". Fundamental and Clinical Pharmacology. 19 (1): 87–92. doi:10.1111/j.1472-8206.2004.00311.x. PMID 15660964. S2CID 23758447.
- Gurib-Fakim, A.; Subratty, H.; Narod, F.; Govinden-Soulange, J.; Mahomoodally, F. (2005). "Biological activity from indigenous medicinal plants of Mauritius". Pure and Applied Chemistry. 77: 41–51. doi:10.1351/pac200577010041.
- Govinden-Soulange, J.; Magan, N.; Gurib-Fakim, A.; Gauvin, A.; Smadja, J.; Kodja, H. (2004). "Chemical composition and in vitro antimicrobial activities of the essential oils from endemic Psiadia species growing in Mauritius". Biological & Pharmaceutical Bulletin. 27 (11): 1814–1818. doi:10.1248/bpb.27.1814. PMID 15516729.
- Mahomoodally, M. F.; Gurib-Fakim, A.; Subratty, A. H. (2004). "Momordica charantia extracts inhibit uptake of monosaccharide and amino acid across rat everted gut sacs in-vitro". Biological & Pharmaceutical Bulletin. 27 (2): 216–218. doi:10.1248/bpb.27.216. PMID 14758036.
- Besse, P.; DaSilva, D.; Humeau, L.; Govinden-Soulange, J.; Gurib-Fakim, A.; Kodja, H. (2003). "A genetic diversity study of endangered Psiadia species endemic from Mauritius Island using PCR markers". Biochemical Systematics and Ecology. 31 (12): 1427–1445. Bibcode:2003BioSE..31.1427B. doi:10.1016/S0305-1978(03)00131-5.
- Pedersen, O.; Gurib-Fakim, A.; H., Subratty; Adsersen, A.; Figier, J. (1999). "Pharmacological Properties of Seven Medicinal Plants of the Rubiaceae from Mauritius". Pharmaceutical Biology. 37 (3): 202–207. doi:10.1076/phbi.37.3.202.6300.
- Kodja, H.; Robene-Soustrade, I.; L., Humeau; Dulloo, E.; Figier, J.; Govinden-Soulange, J.; Gurib-Fakim, A. (1998). "Micropropagation of Psiadia arguta through cotyledonary axillary bud culture". Plant Growth Regulation. 25 (2): 75–80. doi:10.1023/A:1005913116300. S2CID 36358341.
- Gurib-Fakim, A. (1996). "Volatile Constituents of the Leaf Oil of Artemisia verlotiorum Lamotte and Ambrosia tenuifolia Sprengel (Syn.: Artemisia psilostachya auct. non L.)". Journal of Essential Oil Research. 8 (5): 559–561. doi:10.1080/10412905.1996.9700689.
- Gurib-Fakim, A.; Sewraj, M.; J., Gueho; Dulloo, E. (1996). "Medicinal Plants of Rodrigues". Pharmaceutical Biology. 34: 2–14. doi:10.1076/phbi.34.1.2.13177.
- Gurib-Fakim, A.; Bourrel, C.; H., Kodja; Govinden, J. (1995). "Chemical Composition of the Essential Oils of Psiadia lithospermifolia (Lam.) Cordem. and P. viscosa (Lam.) A. J. Scott of the Asteraceae Family". Journal of Essential Oil Research. 7 (5): 533–535. doi:10.1080/10412905.1995.9698579.
- Gurib-Fakim, A.; Sewraj, M.; F., Narod; Menut, C. (1995). "Aromatic Plants of Mauritius: Volatile Constituents of the Essential Oils of Coleus aromaticus Benth., Triphasia trifolia (Burm.f.) and Eucalyptus kirtoniana F. Muell". Journal of Essential Oil Research. 7 (2): 215–218. doi:10.1080/10412905.1995.9698504.
- Gurib-Fakim, A.; Demarne, F. (1994). "Constituents of the Essential Oil of the Leaves of Pittosporum balfourii Growing in Rodrigues". Planta Medica. 60 (6): 584–585. Bibcode:1994PlMed..60..584G. doi:10.1055/s-2006-959581. PMID 17236088. S2CID 260251041.
- Gurib-Fakim, A.; Demarne, F. (1995). "Aromatic Plants of Mauritius: Volatile Constituents of the Leaf Oils of Citrus aurantium L., Citrus paradisi Macfad and Citrus sinensis (L.) Osbeck". Journal of Essential Oil Research. 7: 105–109. doi:10.1080/10412905.1995.9698477.
- Gurib-Fakim, A.; Demarne, F. (1994). "Volatile Constituents of Dracaena reflexa Lam. var. angustifolia Baker". Planta Medica. 6 (6): 651–652. doi:10.1080/10412905.1994.9699363.
- Gurib-Fakim (1994). "Constituents of the Essential Oils from Piper sylvestre Growing in Mauritius" (PDF). Planta Medica. 60 (4): 376–377. Bibcode:1994PlMed..60..376G. doi:10.1055/s-2006-959506. PMID 17236059. S2CID 45172174.
- Gurib-Fakim, A.; Demarne, F. (1994). "Essential Oil of Terminalia bentzoë (L.) L. f. subsp. rodriguesensis Wickens". Journal of Essential Oil Research. 6 (5): 533–534. doi:10.1080/10412905.1994.9698443.
- Gurib-Fakim, A.; Sewraj, M.; Gueho, J.; Dulloo, E. (1993). "Studies on the Antisickling Properties of Extracts of Sideroxylon puberulum, Faujasiopsis flexuosa, Cardiospermum halicacabum, and Pelargonium graveolens". Journal of Ethnopharmacology. 39 (3): 175–185. doi:10.1016/0378-8741(93)90034-3. PMID 8258975.
- Gurib-Fakim, A.; Sewraj, M. (1992). "Studies on the Antisickling Properties of Extracts of Sideroxylon puberulum, Faujasiopsis flexuosa, Cardiospermum halicacabum, and Pelargonium graveolens". Planta Medica. 58: 648–649. Bibcode:1992PlMed..58S.648G. doi:10.1055/s-2006-961657. S2CID 260250962.

=== Popular publications ===
- Plantes médicinales de l'Île Rodrigues (1994)
- Plantes médicinales de Maurice (1995)
- Natural toxins and poisonous plants of Mauritius (1999)
- Maurice par les plantes médicinales (2002)
- Mauritius through its medicinal plants (2002)
- Molecular and therapeutic aspects of redox biochemistry (2004)
- An illustrated guide to the flora of Mauritius and the Indian Ocean Islands (2003)
- Medicinal Plants of the Indian Ocean Islands (2004)
- Guide illustré de la flore de Maurice et des îles de l'Océan Indien (2004)
- Biodiversity towards drugs development (2005)
- Booklet on 'Medicinal Plants at the state House, Le Réduit' (2005)
- Lesser-known and under-utilised plant resources (2005)
- Ressources végétales méconnues et sous-utilisées (2005)
- Guide illustré de la flore de Maurice et des îles de l’Océan Indien (2006)
- Medicinal Plants of Mauritius and of the World (2007, 2011)
- Plantes médicinales de Maurice et d’ailleurs (2007, 2011)
- Plantes d’hier et médicaments d’aujourd’hui (2008)
- Mieux connaître les arbres et arbrisseaux de Maurice et des îles de l'Océan Indien(2008)
- Towards a better understanding of Trees and Shrubs of Mauritius and the Indian Ocean Islands (2009)
- African Herbal Pharmacopoeia (2010)
- Guide des plantes tropicales de l'Île Maurice et de La Réunion (2011)
- Trees of the World (2013)

== See also ==
- President of Mauritius
- List of presidents of Mauritius

Political offices
Preceded by Monique Ohsan Bellepeau; Acting	President of Mauritius; 2015–2018	Succeeded by Barlen Vyapoory; Acting
