= Robert Hungley =

Sixth vice president of Mauritius

His Excellency Robert Hungley GOSK
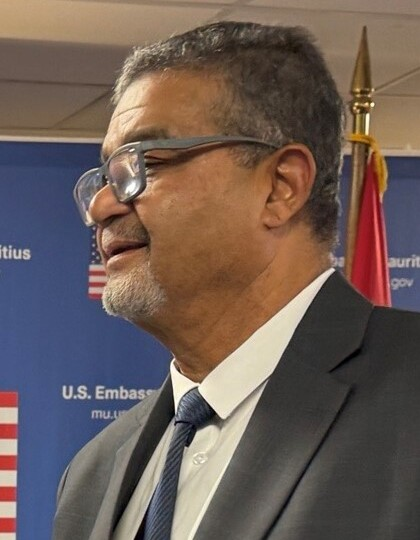
- Hungley in 2025

Vice-President of Mauritius
- Incumbent
- Assumed office 7 December 2024
- President: Dharam Gokhool
- Prime Minister: Navinchandra Ramgoolam
- Preceded by: Eddy Boissézon

Personal details
- Born: Jean Robert Yvan Hungley; 15 February 1957 (age 69) Rose Hill, British Mauritius
- Party: Mauritian Militant Movement
- Spouse: Marie Noëlle

Jean Robert Yvan Hungley (born 15 February 1957) is a Mauritian politician who has been the 7th Vice-President of Mauritius under President Dharam Gokhool since 2024. A member of the Mauritian Militant Movement since 1975, Hungley is a member of the MMM's central committee and politburo. In Beau Bassin-Rose Hill he was a member of the municipal council from 1995 to 2005, and mayor from 2004 to 2005.

== Early life ==
Jean Yvan Robert Hungley was born in Rose Hill, British Mauritius, on 15 February 1957. He was the second eldest of eight children. His father was a dockyard worker and his mother was an activist. He was educated at the primary and secondary schools in Rose Hill. He participated in the 1975 Mauritian student protests seeking free education. Hungley worked in the freight forwarder industry.

== Career ==
Hungley joined the Mauritian Militant Movement (MMM) in 1975. He became a member of the MMM's politburo in 2015, and is a member of its central committee. He was Deputy Secretary General of the MMM.

Hungley served on the Beau Bassin-Rose Hill municipal council from 1995 to 2005, and as mayor from 2004 to 2005. Hungley unsuccessfully ran for a seat in the National Assembly from the 18th constituency in the 2010 election and in the 4th constituency in the 2019 election.

Prime Minister Navin Ramgoolam nominated Hungley for Vice-President of Mauritius on 6 December 2024, and Hungley's nomination was approved by the National Assembly without opposition. He took the oath of office on 7 December.

== Personal life ==
Hungley married Marie Noëlle.

== Awards and decorations ==
- Grand Officer of the Order of the Star and Key of the Indian Ocean

== Works cited ==
=== News ===
- "Comité central du MMM: Bhagwan remplace Ganoo à la présidence". L'Express. 25 April 2015. Archived from the original on 8 July 2025.
- Lebrasse, Christelle (6 December 2024). "Robert Hungley : portrait du nouveau vice-président de la République". Mauritius Broadcasting Corporation. Archived from the original on 8 July 2025.

=== Web ===
- "Bio Data". Vice-President of Mauritius. Archived from the original on 8 July 2025.
- "Eighth National Assembly Parliamentary Debates" (PDF). National Assembly. 6 December 2024. Archived (PDF) from the original on 27 June 2025.
- "Press Release" (PDF). President of Mauritius. Archived (PDF) from the original on 11 December 2024.
