= Monique Ohsan Bellepeau =

Former vice president of Mauritius

Monique Ohsan Bellepeau GOSK
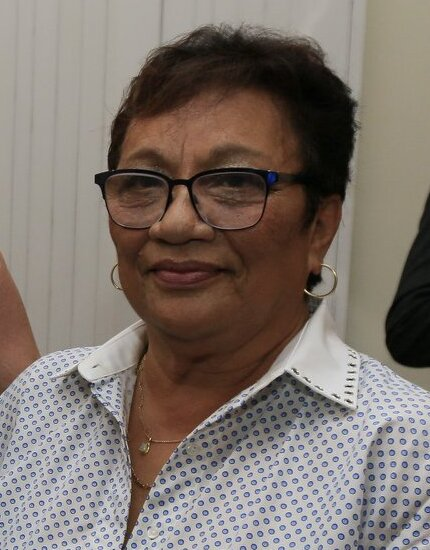
- Ohsan Bellepeau in 2018

Acting President of Mauritius
- In office 29 May 2015 – 5 June 2015
- Prime Minister: Anerood Jugnauth
- Preceded by: Kailash Purryag
- Succeeded by: Ameenah Gurib-Fakim
- In office 31 March 2012 – 21 July 2012
- Prime Minister: Navin Ramgoolam
- Preceded by: Anerood Jugnauth
- Succeeded by: Kailash Purryag

Vice-President of Mauritius
- In office 13 November 2010 – 3 April 2016
- President: Anerood Jugnauth; Herself (acting); Kailash Purryag; Herself (acting); Ameenah Gurib-Fakim
- Preceded by: Angidi Chettiar
- Succeeded by: Barlen Vyapoory

Personal details
- Born: 1942 (age 83–84)
- Party: Labour Party
- Spouse: Yves Joseph Bellepeau

Agnès Monique Ohsan Bellepeau GOSK (born 1942) is a Mauritian politician and was the fourth vice president of Mauritius from November 2010 to April 2016. She was acting president of Mauritius from 31 March 2012 to 21 July 2012 when Sir Anerood Jugnauth resigned up to the inauguration of Kailash Purryag to the office. She was again acting president from 29 May 2015 to 5 June 2015 when Kailash Purryag resigned up to the inauguration of Ameenah Gurib to the office.

== Career ==
Monique Ohsan Bellepeau was a journalist and a news announcer on the national TV channel, the Mauritius Broadcasting Corporation.

She won the parliamentary elections and was appointed vice president on 12 November 2010 following the death of Vice President Angidi Chettiar. She was elected unanimously by all members of the National Assembly to become the first female Vice President of Mauritius. Ohsan Bellepeau was a member of the Mauritian Labor Party and later became the President of the Party. She is the daughter of Bartholomée Ohsan, who was a founding member of the party.

On 30 March 2012, Mauritius president Anerood Jugnauth resigned after a feud with the country's prime minister, leaving the presidential chair to vice-president Ohsan Bellepeau. She was succeeded as president by Kailash Purryag on 21 July 2012.

On 29 May 2015, President Kailash Purryag resigned, leaving the presidential chair again to vice-president Ohsan Bellepeau. She was succeeded as president by Ameenah Gurib on 5 June 2015.

== Private life ==
She was married to Yves Joseph Bellepeau, who was a businessman. He died on 16 November 2010, three days after she was sworn in as vice president.

== Honours and decorations ==
- Mauritius:
  - Grand Commander of the Order of the Star and Key of the Indian Ocean (2010)

Political offices
Preceded by Angidi Chettiar	Vice President of Mauritius; 2010–2016	Succeeded by Barlen Vyapoory
Preceded by Anerood Jugnauth	President of Mauritius; Acting; 2012	Succeeded by Kailash Purryag
Preceded by Kailash Purryag	President of Mauritius; Acting; 2015	Succeeded by Ameenah Gurib
