= Jagdish Koonjul =

Mauritian politician (born 1952)

His Excellency Jagdish Dharmachand Koonjul GCSK, GOSK
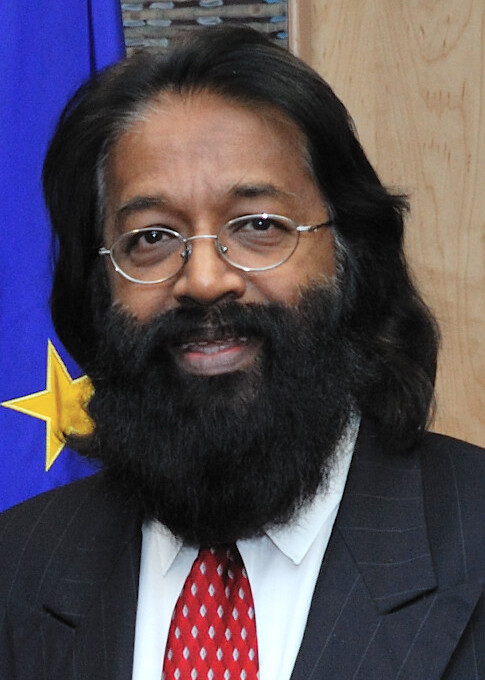

Permanent Representative of Mauritius to the United Nations
- Incumbent
- Assumed office 2015
- In office 2001–2006

Personal details
- Born: 14 April 1952 (age 73)

Jagdish Dharamchand Koonjul, GCSK, GOSK, is the Permanent Representative of Mauritius to the United Nations, and was President of the United Nations Security Council in January 2002.

== Career ==
Koonjul was Mauritian chief representative to the United Nations Security Council from 2001 to 2002, and President of the United Nations Security Council in January 2002. He was Permanent Representative of Mauritius to the United Nations from 2001 to 2006.

He served as Vice-President of the United Nations Economic and Social Council from 2003 to 2004. From 2003 to 2006 he served as Chairman of the Alliance of Small Island States, and from 2006 to 2011 as Ambassador/Head of Bilateral Directorate for Asia and the Middle East.

Koonjul was Mauritian Ambassador to Belgium and Permanent Representative to the European Union from 2011 to 2015.

Since July 2015 Koonjul served as Secretary for Foreign Affairs of Mauritius.

In November 2015, Koonjul was appointed Permanent Representative of Mauritius to the United Nations for a second time.

In 2016, Koonjul was awarded Grand Officer of the Order of the Star and Key of the Indian Ocean (G.O.S.K) and later in 2022, the Grand Commander of the Order of the Star and Key of the Indian Ocean (G.C.S.K) for "valuable contribution in the field of diplomacy, particularly, for the effective completion of the decolonisation process of Mauritius."

=== 2022 Mauritian expedition to Chagos Archipelago ===
In February 2022, Koonjul as Permanent Representative of Mauritius to the United Nations led a fifteen day Mauritian expedition to the islands of the Chagos Archipelago, which recent decisions by the International Court of Justice, United Nations General Assembly and the International Tribunal for the Law of the Sea had supported Mauritius' claim to the islands, rather than the United Kingdom's British Indian Ocean Territory claim. Exiled islanders made their first unsupervised visit to an island in the Chagos Archipelago. Prime Minister of Mauritius, Pravind Jugnauth, said this was not to embarrass the UK, but "merely an exercise of our sovereignty over part of our territory and that is in accordance with international law."

Koonjul raised the Mauritian flag on Peros Banhos. The main purpose of the expedition was to survey the unclaimed Blenheim Reef, to discover if it is exposed at high tide so is claimable.

== Awards and decorations ==
- Mauritius:
  - Grand Officer of the Order of the Star and Key of the Indian Ocean (2016)
  - Grand Commander of the Order of the Star and Key of the Indian Ocean (2021)

== Personal life ==
Koonjul is married and has four children.

== See also ==
- Foreign relations of Mauritius
- List of diplomatic missions of Mauritius
- Politics of Mauritius
