= Veerasamy Ringadoo =

1st President of the Republic of Mauritius

The Right Honourable Sir Veerasamy Ringadoo GCMG GCSK QC
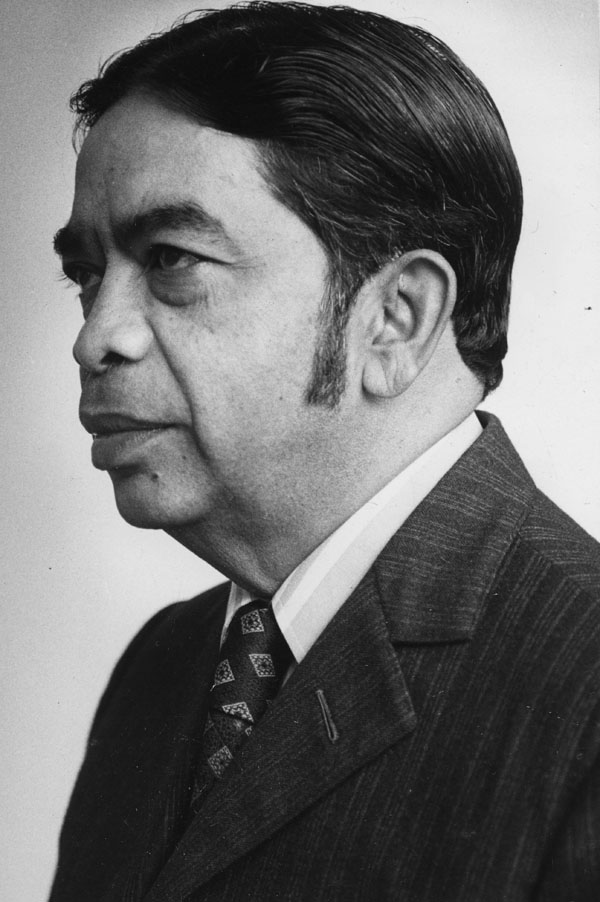

President of Mauritius
- In office 12 March 1992 – 30 June 1992
- Prime Minister: Anerood Jugnauth
- Vice President: Vacant
- Preceded by: Elizabeth II as Queen of Mauritius
- Succeeded by: Cassam Uteem

Governor-General of Mauritius
- In office 17 January 1986 – 12 March 1992
- Monarch: Elizabeth II
- Prime Minister: Sir Anerood Jugnauth
- Preceded by: Sir Cassam Moollan (acting)
- Succeeded by: Position abolished

Personal details
- Born: Veerasamy Ringadoo; 20 October 1920 Port Louis, British Mauritius
- Died: 9 September 2000 (aged 79)
- Education: London School of Economics (LSE)

Sir Veerasamy Ringadoo, GCMG, GCSK, QC, (20 October 1920 – 9 September 2000) was a Mauritian politician, minister, the sixth and last governor-general of Mauritius from 1986 to 1992, and then the first president of Mauritius from March to June 1992.

== Early life ==
Born in 1920 in an Indian Tamil family, Ringadoo was educated at Port Louis Grammar School and completed his LLB at the London School of Economics in 1948. He was also the founder of the League of Tamils in 1937.

== Political career ==
At the 1953 general elections he was elected for the first time to the Legislative Council in Moka-Flacq, representing Labour Party alongside Ackbar Gujadhur and Satcam Boolell. At the 1959 and 1963 elections he was elected to the Legislative Council at No. 17 Quartier Militaire after standing as candidate of Labour Party.

In 1967, he was elected to Legislative Council at Constituency No. 8 (Quartier Militaire-Moka) as candidate of the Independence Party coalition alongside Mahess Teeluck and Abdool Razack Mohamed.

In 1976, he was re-elected at No. 8, alongside Mahess Teeluck. He held the portfolio of finance minister of Mauritius during most of these terms. But at the 1982 general elections he was not elected following the landslide victory of MMM-PSM against PTr-PMSD.

He served as governor-general of Mauritius from 17 January 1986 to 12 March 1992, when it became a republic. Ringadoo then served as interim president until later in 1992, when he was replaced by the second president, Cassam Uteem.

== Awards and honours ==
- Mauritius
  - Knight Bachelor
  - Knight Grand Cross of the Order of St Michael and St George
  - Grand Commander of the Order of the Star and Key of the Indian Ocean

Ringadoo was knighted in the 1975 New Year Honours, and following his appointment as Governor-General, appointed a Knight Grand Cross of the Order of St. Michael and St. George in June 1986.

Government offices
Preceded by Cassam Moollan; Acting	Governor-General of Mauritius; 1986–1992	Succeeded by Position abolished
Political offices
Preceded by Elizabeth II as Queen of Mauritius	President of Mauritius; 1992	Succeeded by Cassam Uteem
