= Rivaltz Quenette =

Mauritian civil servant and Clerk of the National Assembly

Louis Rivaltz Quenette OBE, GOSK (17 September 1928 – 12 July 2015), was a Mauritian senior civil servant, Clerk of the National Assembly, and writer.

== Early life ==
Rivaltz Quenette was born in Port Louis in British Mauritius. He attended primary schools Immaculée Conception and Champ de Lort and then received his secondary education at Bhujoharry College. For most of his life he was a resident of Ward 4 of Port Louis, and was a close acquaintance of politician Satcam Boolell and poet Édouard Maunick.

== Career ==
In 1949, he joined the Civil Service. From 1984 to 1991, he was the Clerk of the National Assembly by the time of his retirement. He then worked from 1991 to 1996 as a consultant to the government.

Rivaltz Quenette was the founder of several masonic lodges, including the Loge Louis Léchelle. From 1978 to 1980 he was the Grand Master of the Loge La Triple Espérance, and in 1985 he was the Grand Master of the Loge Louis Léchelle.

Rivaltz Quenette also authored several historical books on a number of subjects including Reverend Jean Lebrun, the Municipality of Port Louis and Mauritian freemasonry.

== Recognition ==
In 1965 he was awarded the Jean Lebrun Prize. Rivaltz Quenette was awarded the title of Officer of the British Empire in 1980 and on 12 March 2013 he was also given the title of GOSK.

== Works ==
- L’œuvre du Révérend Jean Le Brun à Maurice
- Un arrondissement de l’Ouest port-louisien, le Ward IV
- La franc-maçonnerie à l'île Maurice
