= Prithvirajsing Roopun =

Mauritian politician

His Excellency Prithvirajsing Roopun GCSK
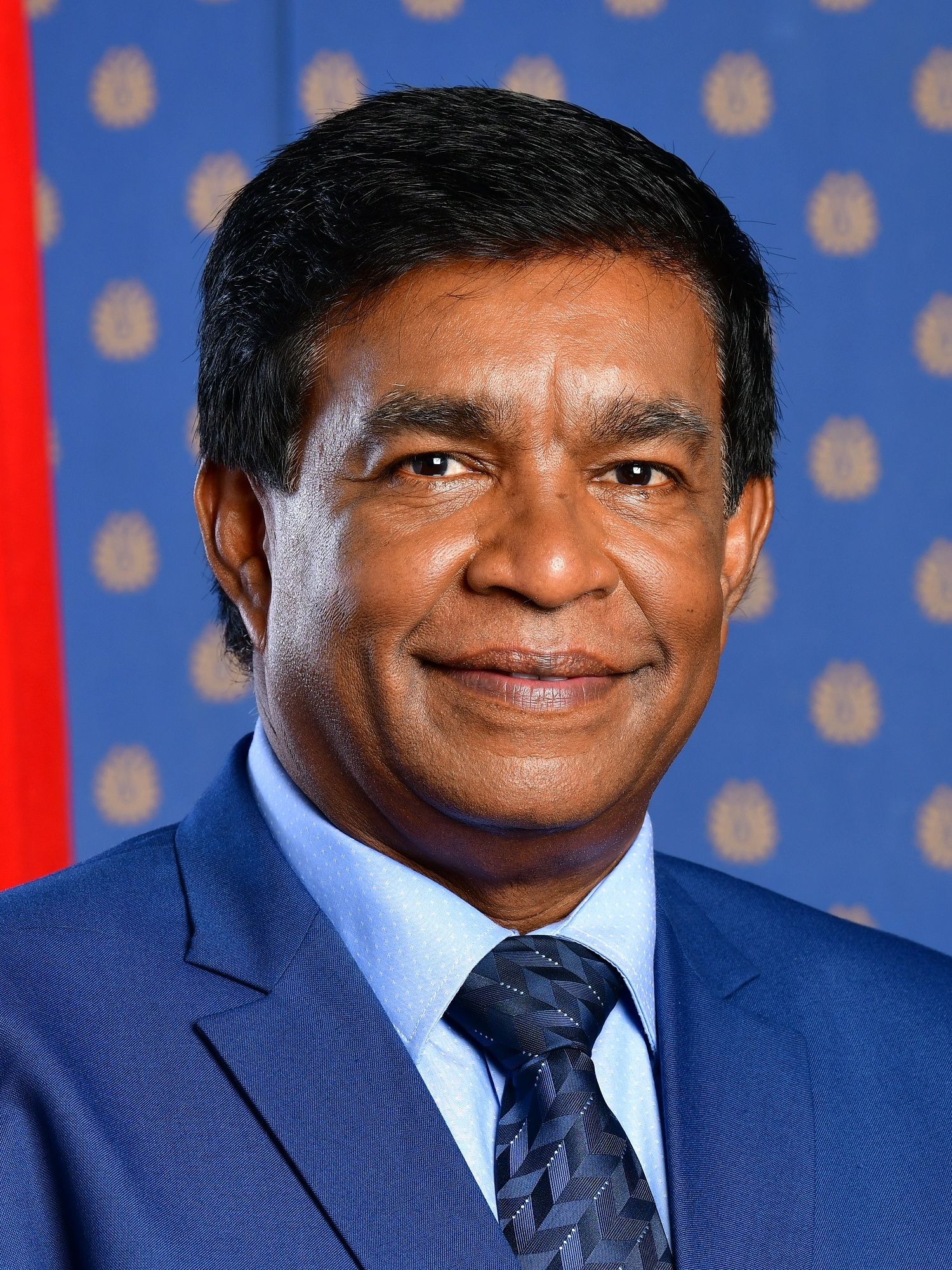
- Official portrait, 2020

President of Mauritius
- In office 2 December 2019 – 6 December 2024
- Prime Minister: Pravind Jugnauth; Navin Ramgoolam
- Vice President: Eddy Boissézon
- Preceded by: Eddy Balancy (acting)
- Succeeded by: Dharam Gokhool

Minister of Arts and Culture
- In office 21 December 2016 – 12 November 2019
- Prime Minister: Anerood Jugnauth; Pravind Jugnauth
- Preceded by: Dan Babboo
- Succeeded by: Avinash Teeluck

Minister of Social Integration and Economic Empowerment
- In office 15 December 2014 – 24 January 2017
- Prime Minister: Anerood Jugnauth; Pravind Jugnauth
- Preceded by: Surendra Dayal
- Succeeded by: Alain Wong

Member of Parliament for Flacq and Bon Accueil
- In office 5 May 2010 – 7 November 2019
- Preceded by: Dharam Gokhool
- Succeeded by: Vikram Hurdoyal

Personal details
- Born: 24 May 1959 (age 67) Quatre Bornes, British Mauritius
- Party: Militant Socialist Movement (1983–2019)
- Spouse: Sayukta Roopun
- Children: 4
- Profession: Attorney

Prithvirajsing (Pradeep) Roopun GCSK (Mauritian Creole pronunciation: [pʁitviʁad͡ʒsiŋ ʁupʌn]; born 24 May 1959) is a Mauritian politician who served as the seventh president of Mauritius from 2019 to 2024.

== Early life, education, career and family life ==
Prithvirajsing Roopun was born in an Indian Hindu family and grew up in Morcellement St. Jean, a suburb of Quatre Bornes. He attended secondary school at New Eton College in Rose Hill and worked as a mathematics teacher at Eden College. He has been qualified and admitted to practice as an attorney at law since 1986. Roopun is a holder of a master's degree in international business law (LLM) from the University of Central Lancashire.

Since 1989 and for over fifteen years, Roopun has been a member of the board of examiner of the Council of Legal Education. He also lectured at the Faculty of Law of the University of Mauritius.

He is married to Sayukta Roopun. Their daughters are Divya, Jyotsna, Adishta and Vedisha.

== Political career ==
Roopun entered politics in 1983 and stood as candidate for the first time in 1995. He was elected in constituency No. 14, Savanne and Black River in the 2000 general election to serve the Legislative Assembly as deputy chief government whip until 2004. In 2005, he was appointed as minister of local government and solid waste management.

Roopun was elected in constituency No. 9, Flacq and Bon Accueil, in the 2010 general election. He was the deputy speaker of the National Assembly of Mauritius between 2010 and 2012.

He also represented Mauritius as a member of the Pan African Parliament from 2010 to 2014, where he was deputy chair of the Committee of Transport, Industry, Communications, Energy, Science, and Technology.

From December 2014 to January 2017, Roopun served as minister of social integration and economic empowerment, having as a major responsibility the eradication of extreme poverty and the empowerment of the vulnerable groups. During his tenure, a Marshall Plan Against Poverty was elaborated with the support of the UNDP and a scheme providing for a subsistence allowance for families living in extreme poverty was introduced.

From January 2017 to November 2019, he served as minister of arts and culture. During his tenure, he chaired the UNESCO 13th Session of the Intergovernmental Committee for the Safeguarding of the Intangible Cultural Heritage during which reggae music of Jamaica was inscribed on the representative list.

== Nomination as president of Mauritius ==
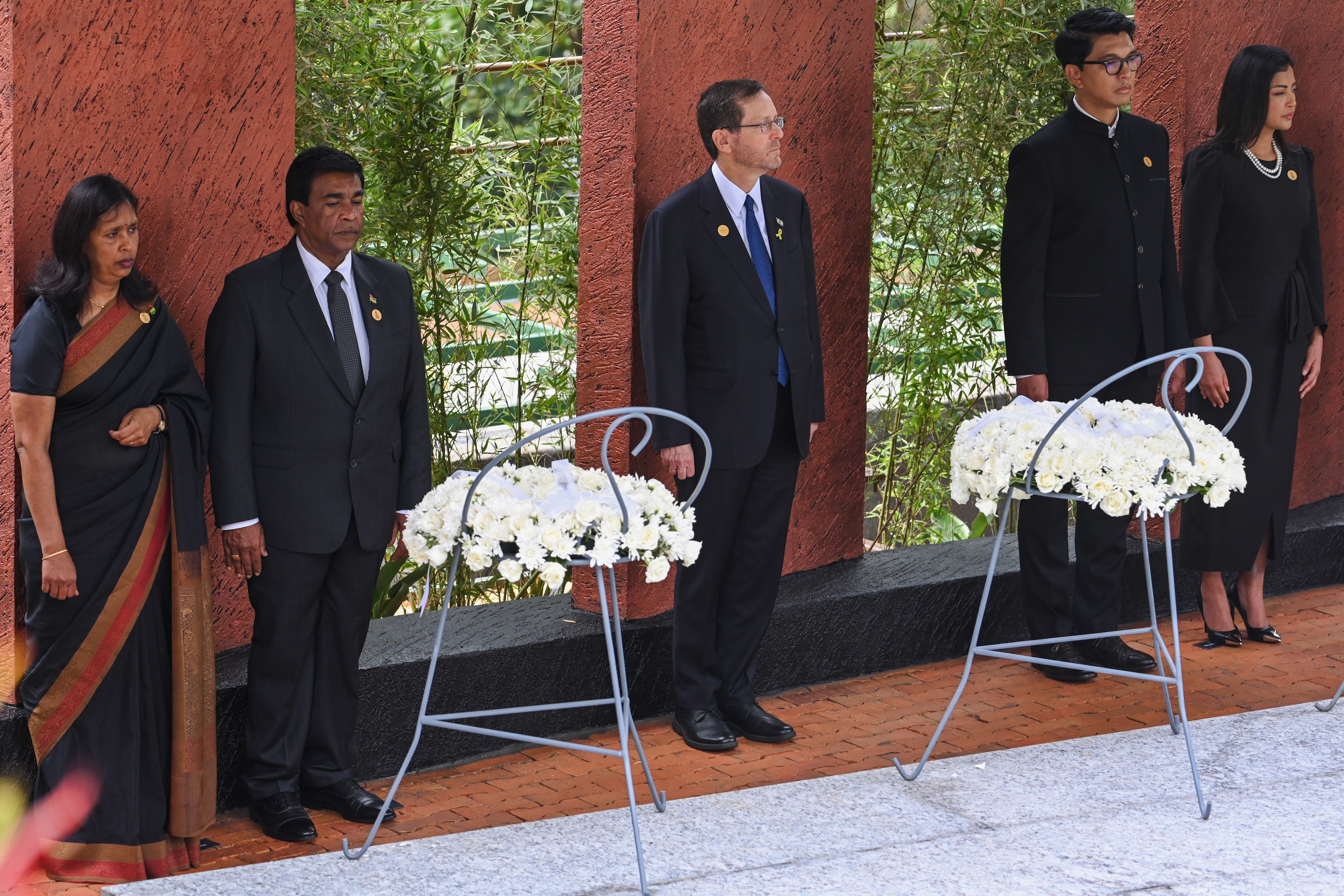
Roopun, Israeli President Isaac Herzog and Madagascar's President Andry Rajoelina at the Kigali Genocide Memorial in Rwanda, 7 April 2024

Although he was not a candidate at the 2019 general election, soon after he was nominated as the seventh president of Mauritius by the National Assembly on 2 December 2019 and was sworn in on the same day. On his assumption as President of the Republic of Mauritius, he received the award of Grand Commander of the Order of the Star and Key of the Indian Ocean by virtue of the National Awards Act 1993 Section (6) 1

== Controversies ==
On 11 February 2020 one of the motorcycle policemen, who generally accompany the president's limousine and ensure its clear passage through congested traffic, was seriously hurt when he came off his motorcycle at high speed and in wet weather at Trianon. This prompted a debate about the unnecessary risks that police have to bear in order for politicians to travel on Mauritian roads.

At the end of February 2020 the Indian press reported that Roopun and his family were stopped for carrying excess baggage in Varanasi, India when he was on a private trip. Roopun was asked to pay the extra charges by the Air India staff at the Lal Bahadur Shastri Airport before proceeding with his visit. However following the intervention of two affluent figures the Air India staff had to waive the extra charges.

His brother Dharmaveersing Roopun (also known as Soudesh Roopun) is a notary who has been involved in a number of fictitious land sales whereby the plots of land do not legally belong to the seller, but Roopun has pocketed the money for the various transactions. He is part of a group which includes brokers and land surveyors. For example in 2000 Louis Gaetan L'Eveille successfully sued Roopun and others for the fraudulent sale of land and demanded the reimbursement of the Rs 0.3 Million which he had paid to Roopun. Despite a favourable ruling by the magistrate, followed by another favourable ruling by a judge of the Supreme Court, including and advice to the Chambre des Notaires and the Attorney General to take further action against Roopun, the latter has been operating freely, defrauding further victims. In 2018 Roopun did not reimburse Rs 1.4 million to Jamil J. following the fake sale of land at Midlands. In 2019 Nawosah and Quirin spent Rs 2.4 millions after being misled by Roopun's group and lodged a formal complaint with the Land Fraud Squad but no action has been taken.

== Awards and honours ==
- Mauritius:
  - Grand Commander of the Order of the Star and Key of the Indian Ocean (GCSK) (2019)
- Portugal:
  - Grand Collar of the Order of Prince Henry (2024)
