= Cassam Uteem =

Former President of Mauritius (born 1941)

The Honourable Cassam Uteem GCSK
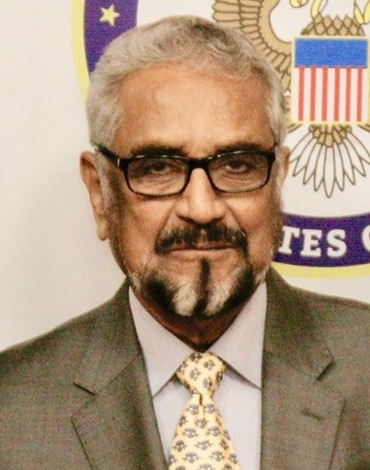
- Uteem in 2021

President of Mauritius
- In office 30 June 1992 – 15 February 2002
- Prime Minister: Anerood Jugnauth; Navin Ramgoolam
- Vice President: Rabindranath Ghurburrun; Angidi Chettiar
- Preceded by: Veerasamy Ringadoo
- Succeeded by: Angidi Chettiar (acting)

Minister of Employment, Social Security and National Solidarity
- In office 15 June 1982 – 22 March 1983
- Prime Minister: Anerood Jugnauth
- Succeeded by: Diwakur Bundhun

Member of Parliament; for Port Louis Maritime and Port Louis East
- In office 26 December 1976 – June 1992
- Preceded by: Elias Oozeerally
- Succeeded by: Amanullah Essoof

Personal details
- Born: 22 March 1941 (age 85) Port Louis, British Mauritius
- Party: Mauritian Militant Movement
- Spouse: Zohra Jahangeer Uteem
- Children: Reza Uteem; Dilshaad Uteem; Oomar Uteem

Cassam Uteem GCSK (Urdu: کاسم یوٹیم; born 22 March 1941) is a Mauritian political figure who served as the second president of Mauritius from 30 June 1992 to 15 February 2002. He is the longest serving president of Mauritius.

== Early life and education ==
Cassam Uteem attended the secondary school Royal College Port Louis. Then he travelled to France and studied at Paris VII University and graduated with a bachelor's degree in Art and a master's degree in Psychology. He also holds a Certificate in Social Work from the University of Mauritius and a "Diplôme d’État Français d’Assistant des services sociaux".

== Ancestry and family life ==
In the 1800s Cassam Uteem's ancestors migrated from the historic city of Azamgarh's Village Dubawan, Uttar Pradesh in India.

He married Zohra Jahangeer and they have 3 children: Reza Uteem, Dilshaad Uteem and Oomar Uteem. However, Oomar Uteem died in 2007. They also have 10 grandchildren.

== Political career ==
In the 1960s, Cassam Uteem was a youth leader and social worker who was actively involved in the local community during colonial times that preceded the 1968 Independence of Mauritius. He became a leading member of leftist political party the Mauritian Militant Movement (MMM). In 1969 he was elected Councillor of the City of Port Louis at the Municipal Elections, a position in which he remained for several years before becoming city's Lord Mayor in 1986.

Cassam Uteem was elected a member of the Mauritian Legislative Assembly in 1976. He was re-elected as a member of Parliament in 1982, 1983, 1987 and 1991. In 1982 and 1983, he held the portfolio of Minister of Employment, Social Security and National Solidarity. In 1990, he became Deputy Prime Minister and Minister of Industry and Industrial Technology. When he formed part of the Opposition in Parliament he was "Opposition Whip" and Chairman of the "Public Accounts Committee."

Following the establishment of a republic on 12 March 1992, the last Governor-General, Sir Veerasamy Ringadoo, became the first President. However, this was under an interim arrangement, and Cassam Uteem was nominated to serve as President for a five-year term with effect from 30 June of that year.

On 15 February 2002, he resigned from office, after refusing to sign a controversial anti-terrorism bill, namely PoTA, into the constitution. His term would have ended in June 2002. He was replaced as president by Angidi Chettiar.

On 10 November 2014, Mr. Uteem was appointed United Nations Secretary-General's Special Envoy and Head of the United Nations Electoral Observation Mission in Burundi.

In November 2014, Uteem was elected President of International Movement ATD Fourth World.

Uteem was a candidate for the position of Chairperson of the African Union Commission in early 2008, but withdrew prior to the vote.

Cassam Uteem is a Member of the Global Leadership Foundation, an organization that works to support democratic leadership, prevent and resolve conflict through mediation, and promote good governance. It focuses on democratic institutions, open markets, human rights, and the rule of law. GLF does so by making available, discreetly and in confidence, the experience of former leaders to today's national leaders. It is a not-for-profit organization composed of former heads of government, senior governmental and international organization officials who work closely with Heads of Government on governance-related issues of concern to them.

Uteem appeared in the John Pilger documentary Stealing a Nation, which is about the Chagos Archipelago sovereignty dispute.

== Awards and decorations ==
- Mauritius:
  - Grand Commander of the Order of the Star and Key of the Indian Ocean (1993)

Political offices
Preceded by Sir Veerasamy Ringadoo	President of Mauritius; 1992 – 2002	Succeeded by Angidi Chettiar; Acting
