= Raouf Bundhun =

Mauritian politician (born 1937)

Raouf Bundhun ابو طالب کسنیلی GOSK
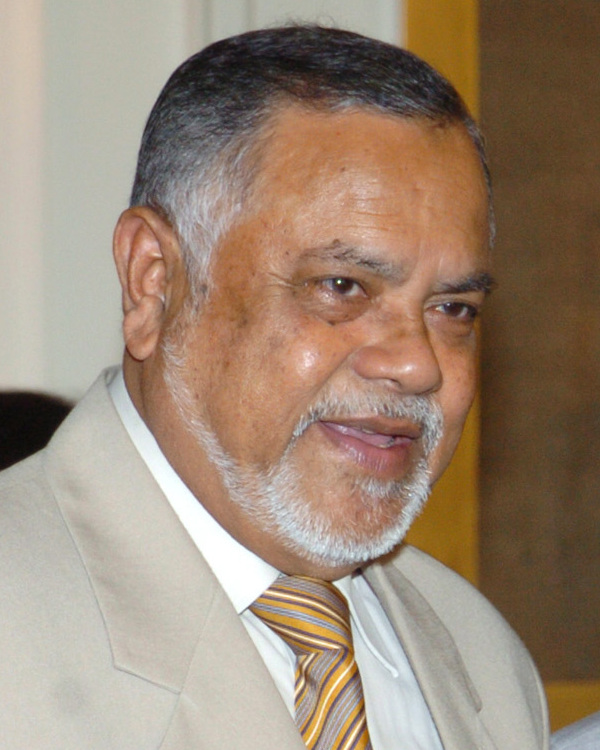
- Bundhun in 2006

3rd Vice President of Mauritius
- In office 25 February 2002 – 24 August 2007
- President: Karl Offmann; Anerood Jugnauth
- Preceded by: Angidi Chettiar
- Succeeded by: Angidi Chettiar

Personal details
- Born: 14 January 1937 (age 89) Amaury, Rivière du Rempart, Mauritius

Abdool Raouf Bundhun (Urdu: ابو طالب کسنیلی; born 14 January 1937) who served as the third vice president of Mauritius from 2002 to 2007. He was elected by National Assembly of Mauritius on 25 February 2002 for a term of five years. Prior to assuming office he had been Mauritius' ambassador to France. He has also been the member of National Assembly of Mauritius for two terms; from 1967 to 1976 and 1995 to 2000. From 1969 to 1975 he had been the Minister for youth and sports and appointed parliamentary secretary by Seewoosagur Ramgoolam in 1969. In 1976 he became the minister of energy of Mauritius. He has chaired the Development Works Corporation.

== Family ==
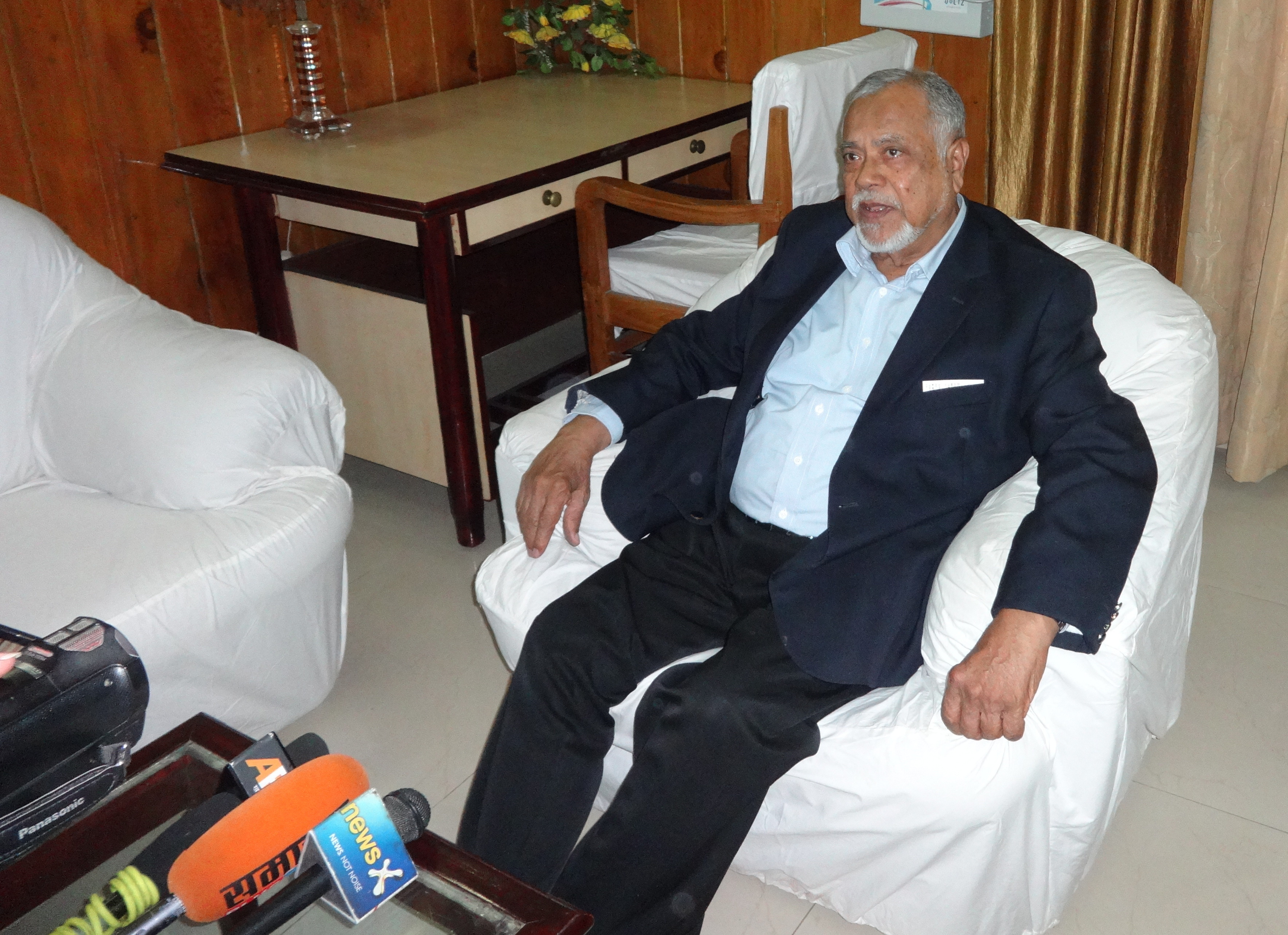
Bundhun addressing media on his visit to Nauli, Ghazipur from where his great grandfather migrated

In 1866 his grandfather Bundhun and grandmother Rajbasiya came to Mauritius from Nauli Village, District Ghazipur, India and settled there. During March 2018, He went to Nauli to see the village of his great grandfather.

== Career ==
His first profession was that of a civil servant but he resigned to join politics. Bundhun had served as a public assistant officer in 1976. He received his education in Paris, London and Mauritius. He had been the municipal councilor of Port-Louis in 1969 and mayor of Quatre-Bornes, served Assembly of French-Speaking Parliamentarians as the member of its executive committee from 1971 to 1976. He headed the Mauritian delegation which participated in Commonwealth Parliamentary Association General Assembly of India in 1975 and member of the delegation which participated in Summit of the Organisation of Africa Unity in 1976. In 2010 his biography On the Wings of Destiny: A. Raouf Bundhun, written by Bhisma Dev Seebaluck was published.

== Awards ==
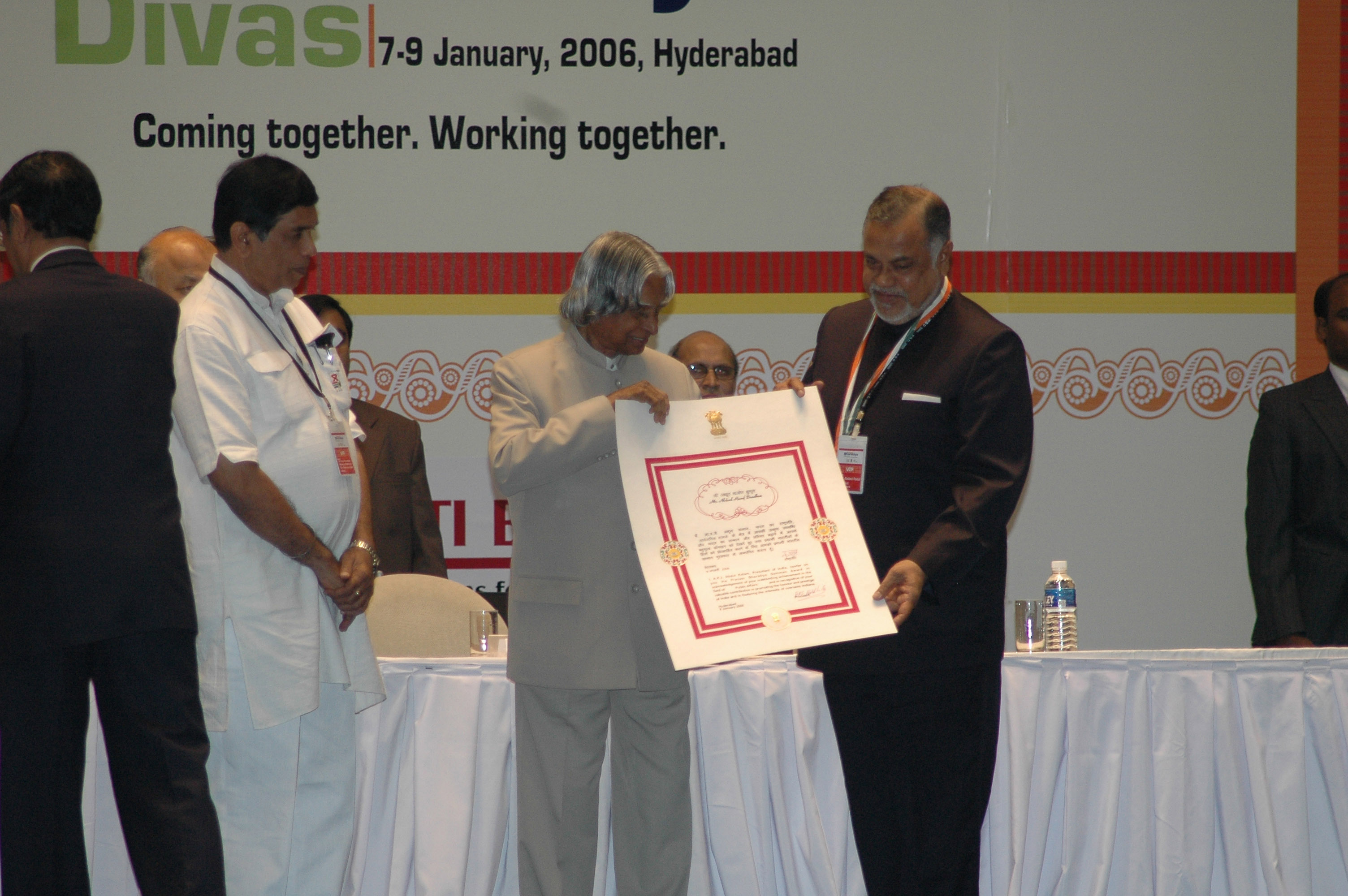
Bundhun receives Pravasi Bharatiya Samman from President of India

The French government decorated him with the Officier de l’Ordre du Mérite and Officier de l’Ordre de la Francophonie. The Indian government honoured him with the Pravasi Bharatiya Samman Award in 2006.

== Bibliography ==
- Bhisma Dev Seebaluck (2010). On the Wings of Destiny: A. Raouf Bundhun. Océan Indien. ISBN 978-99903-0-621-7.

Political offices
Preceded by Angidi Chettiar	Vice President of Mauritius; 2002–2007	Succeeded by Angidi Chettiar
