= Angidi Chettiar =

Mauritian politician (1928–2010)

Angidi Chettiar GOSK CBE
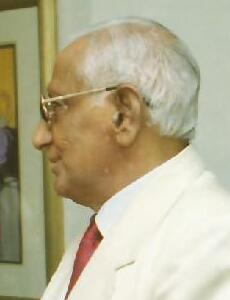
- Chettiar in 2001.

2nd Vice President of Mauritius
- In office 24 August 2007 – 15 September 2010
- President: Anerood Jugnauth
- Preceded by: Raouf Bundhun
- Succeeded by: Monique Ohsan Bellepeau
- In office 1 July 1997 – 17 February 2002
- President: Cassam Uteem
- Preceded by: Rabindranath Ghurburrun
- Succeeded by: Raouf Bundhun

Acting President of Mauritius
- In office 15 February 2002 – 18 February 2002
- Prime Minister: Anerood Jugnauth
- Preceded by: Cassam Uteem
- Succeeded by: Ariranga Pillay (acting)

Personal details
- Born: 29 April 1928 Aruppukottai, Madurai, British India (now India)
- Died: 15 September 2010 (aged 82)
- Party: Mauritian Labor Party
- Spouse: Mrs Chettiar
- Profession: Barrister

Angidi Verriah Chettiar CBE (29 April 1928 – 15 September 2010) was a Mauritian politician who served twice as the second vice president of Mauritius until his death in September 2010.

== Early life ==
Angidi Chettiar was born in Aruppukkottai in Virudhunagar district in the Indian state of Tamil Nadu. He came to Mauritius at the age of 10. His family were traders.

== Political career ==
Angidi Chettiar throughout his political career was a staunch member of the Mauritius Labour Party. He served the party for more than 50 years and held the position of treasurer of the party for a few decades. Before being appointed vice-president of Mauritius, Angidi Chettiar was a member of the Legislative Assembly for many years, serving as Government Chief Whip and eventually Minister in the Government of Prime Minister Sir Seewoosagur Ramgoolam from 1980 to 1982.

He served a first term as vice president from 1997 to 2002, and he briefly became acting president in 2002 when Cassam Uteem resigned. However, Chettiar also resigned within days after refusing to sign a controversial anti-terrorism bill, saying that the bill was discriminatory against Muslims. The line of succession then bestowed the presidential powers and duties onto Supreme Court Justice Ariranga Pillay.

After the come-back of Navin Ramgoolam, current leader of Mauritius Labour Party, to power, Chettiar was reappointed vice-president of Mauritius for a second term by the president of Mauritius, Anerood Jugnauth, in 2007.

He died while serving as vice president on 15 September 2010. He suffered from health problems for a few months before his death. He is survived by four sons and one daughter. Another son has already died.

== Honours ==
- Mauritius:
  - Grand Officer of the Most Distinguished Order of the Star and Key of the Indian Ocean (GOSK)
- United Kingdom:
  - Commander of the Most Excellent Order of the British Empire (CBE)

Political offices
Preceded by Rabindranath Ghurburrun	Vice President of Mauritius; 1997–2002	Succeeded by Raouf Bundhun
Preceded by Cassam Uteem	President of Mauritius; Acting; 2002	Succeeded by Ariranga Pillay; Acting
Preceded by Raouf Bundhun	Vice President of Mauritius; 2007–2010	Succeeded by Monique Ohsan Bellepeau
