= Queen of Mauritius =

Elizabeth II's reign in Mauritius from 1968 to 1992

- Coat of arms of Mauritius

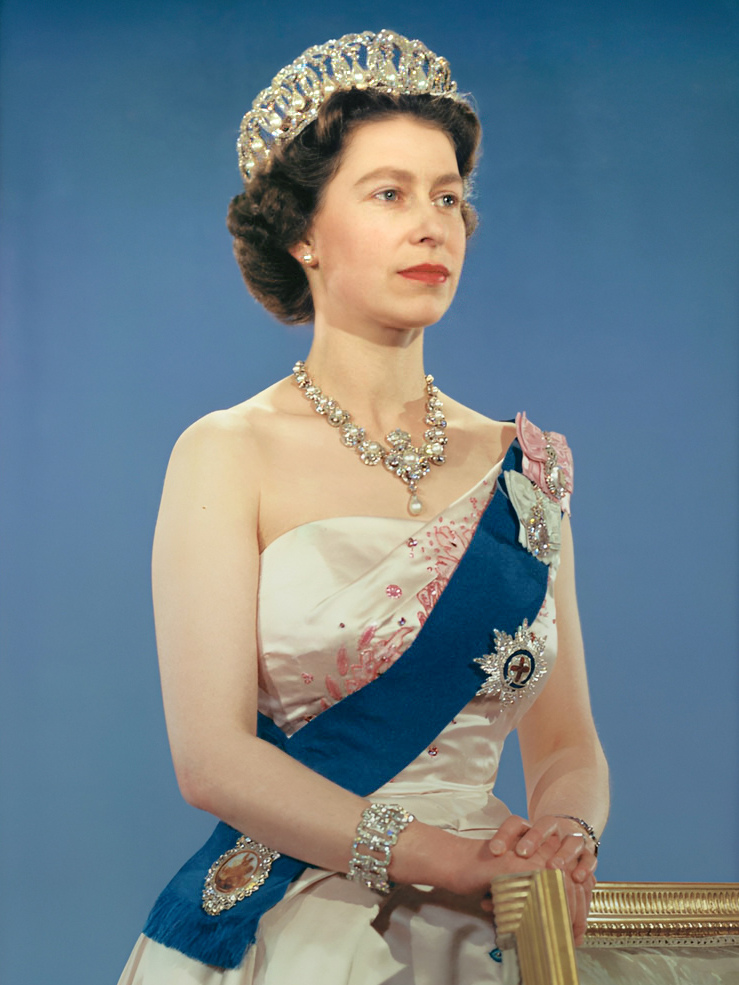
- Elizabeth II

Details
- Style: Her Majesty
- Formed: 12 March 1968
- Abolished: 12 March 1992

Elizabeth II was Queen of Mauritius as well as its head of state from 1968 to 1992 when Mauritius was an independent sovereign state and a constitutional monarchy within the Commonwealth of Nations. She was also the monarch of other Commonwealth realms, including the United Kingdom. Her constitutional roles in Mauritius were delegated to a governor-general. Mauritius became a republic in 1992.

== History ==
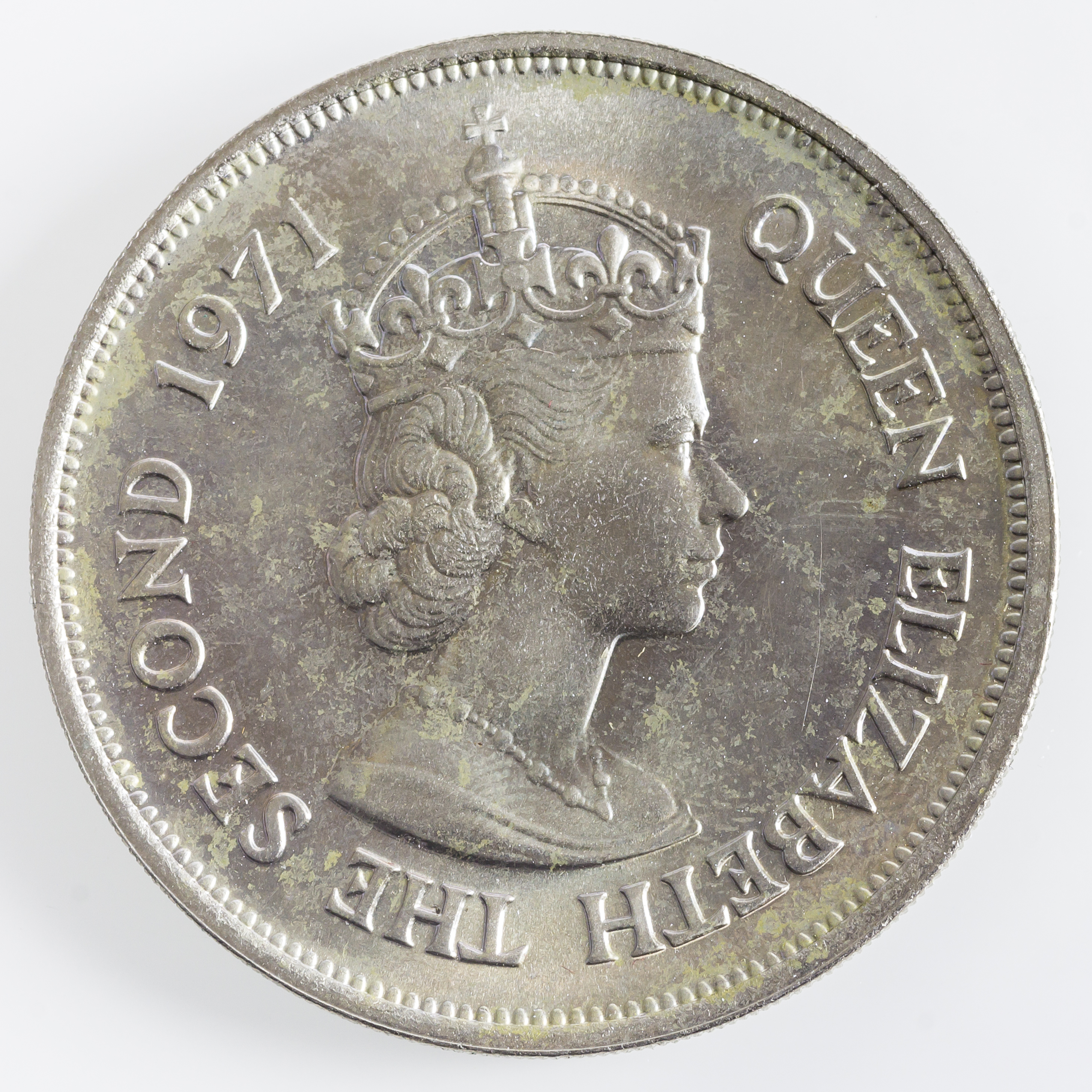
Queen Elizabeth II on a Mauritian 10 rupee coin, 1971

The Parliament of the United Kingdom's Mauritius Independence Act 1968 transformed the British Crown Colony of Mauritius into an independent sovereign state. Unusually, no member of the British royal family attended the independence ceremony on the island because of security concerns. Princess Alexandra was due to attend but after communal violence the British minister of state for the Commonwealth, Lord Shepherd, advised that her visit be cancelled.

Queen Elizabeth and her husband, Prince Philip, visited Mauritius for three days (24–26 March) in 1972, as part of a tour of Asia and Africa. They arrived in Port Louis on the royal yacht Britannia after visiting the Seychelles. They were met by a crowd of nearly a quarter of a million people, and rode through the city in an open-topped car. During the visit, the Queen opened the sixth session of the third Mauritius Parliament. The royal couple left Mauritius for Nairobi by air. It was the first ever visit to the island by a reigning monarch.

Mauritius became a republic within the Commonwealth in 1992 with the president of Mauritius replacing Elizabeth as head of state.

== Queen's Personal Flag for Mauritius ==
Queen Elizabeth II had a personal flag for use in Mauritius. It was used when she visited the nation on 24–26 March 1972, when she first opened the Mauritian Parliament in Port Louis in person. The flag consisted of the coat of arms of Mauritius in banner form: quarterly azure and or, in the first quarter a lymphad of the last in the second, 3 palm trees eradicated vert, in the third, a key in pale the wards downwards gules, and in the issuant, from the base a pile, and in chief a mullet argent. A blue disc of the letter "E" crowned surrounded by a garland of gold roses defaces the flag, which is taken from the Queen's Personal Flag.

The Queen's Personal Flag for Mauritius

== Royal style and titles ==
The proclamation of the Queen's style and titles published in the Mauritius Government Gazette

Elizabeth II had the following style and titles in her role as the monarch of Mauritius:

- 12 March 1968 – 25 April 1968: Elizabeth the Second, by the Grace of God, of the United Kingdom of Great Britain and Northern Ireland and of Her other Realms and Territories Queen, Head of the Commonwealth, Defender of the Faith
- 25 April 1968 – 12 March 1992: Elizabeth the Second, Queen of Mauritius and of Her other Realms and Territories, Head of the Commonwealth
