= Dharam Gokhool =

President of Mauritius since 2024

His Excellency Dharam Gokhool GCSK
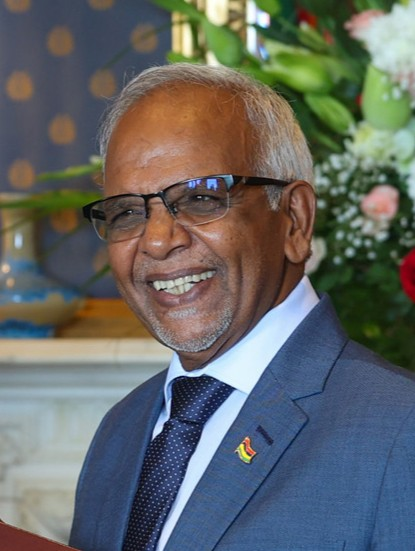
- Gokhool in 2025

President of Mauritius
- Incumbent
- Assumed office 6 December 2024
- Prime Minister: Navin Ramgoolam
- Vice President: Robert Hungley
- Preceded by: Prithvirajsing Roopun

Minister of Industry, Science and Research
- In office 13 September 2008 – 11 May 2010
- Prime Minister: Navin Ramgoolam
- Preceded by: Rajesh Jeetah (Industry)
- Succeeded by: Showkutally Soodhun (Industry); Rajesh Jeetah (Science and Research)

Minister of Education and Human Resources
- In office 7 July 2005 – 13 September 2008
- Prime Minister: Navin Ramgoolam
- Preceded by: Louis Steven Obeegadoo
- Succeeded by: Vasant Bunwaree

Personal details
- Born: 25 October 1949 (age 77) Plaine des Roches, Mauritius
- Party: MMM (1980–c. 1994); Labour Party (since c. 1994)
- Spouse: Brinda Gokhool
- Education: (MBA) Faculty of Management Studies – University of Delhi; Delhi University
- Profession: Academic · politician

Dharambeer Gokhool (born 25 October 1949) is a Mauritian politician who has been serving as the president of Mauritius since 6 December 2024. He won the 2024 presidential election with the backing of the Labour Party.

== Early life and education ==
Gokhool was born on 25 October 1949 in the village of Plaine des Roches, Mauritius to a Hindu Ravived (local terminology for Chamars) family. His father, Manilall Gokhool, worked as a laborer, while his mother, Koshila Gokhool, was a homemaker. He grew up in a rural, working-class household and was encouraged by his family to pursue his studies.

He attended Roches Noires Government School, where he was considered an exceptional student, and then Mapou Government School. In 1975 he graduated from the University of Delhi in India before returning to Mauritius. He became a member of the teaching staff at the University of Mauritius, serving several positions including lecturer, associate professor and dean of the law and management faculty.

As a seasoned academic, Mr Gokhool was made an officier dans l’Ordre des Palmes académiques by the French government.

His journey from a humble village upbringing to academic excellence abroad shaped his lifelong commitment to education, equality, and social upliftment, which later became central themes in both his academic and political careers.

== Career ==
Gokhool began his political career in 1976. In 1980, he joined the Mauritian Militant Movement (MMM) party. In 1982, he won election to the National Assembly as part of the MMM/Mauritius Socialist Party (PSM) alliance which won a landslide victory that year. After the MMM and PSM split, Gokhool stayed with the MMM and ran for re-election in 1983, but lost his bid for the Piton-Rivière-du-Rempart seat. In 1991, he returned to the legislature by winning a seat under the MMM/Militant Socialist Movement (MSM) alliance. However, during his term he defected to the Labour Party.

Gokhool also served as the mayor of the town Vacoas-Phoenix from 1991 to 1993. He was a parliamentary private secretary from 1993 to 1994 and after joining the Labour Party, served as the party's administrative secretary in 2003, then was the secretary general from 2004 to 2005. During the administration of Navin Ramgoolam, Gokhool served as Minister of Education from 2005 to 2008. Following that, he became the Minister of Industry, Science and Research and held that role from 2008 to 2010. After the 2014 elections, he was a candidate for vice president, although he was not chosen for the position.

== Nomination as president of Mauritius ==
Gokhool was officially nominated for the presidency of Mauritius on 6 December 2024, following the completion of Prithvirajsing Roopun’s term. His nomination came after consensus-building among the main parliamentary forces, with the National Assembly unanimously electing him as the 8th President of the Republic of Mauritius. The decision reflected both his long service as an academic and politician and his image as a unifying figure acceptable across party lines.

== Presidency ==
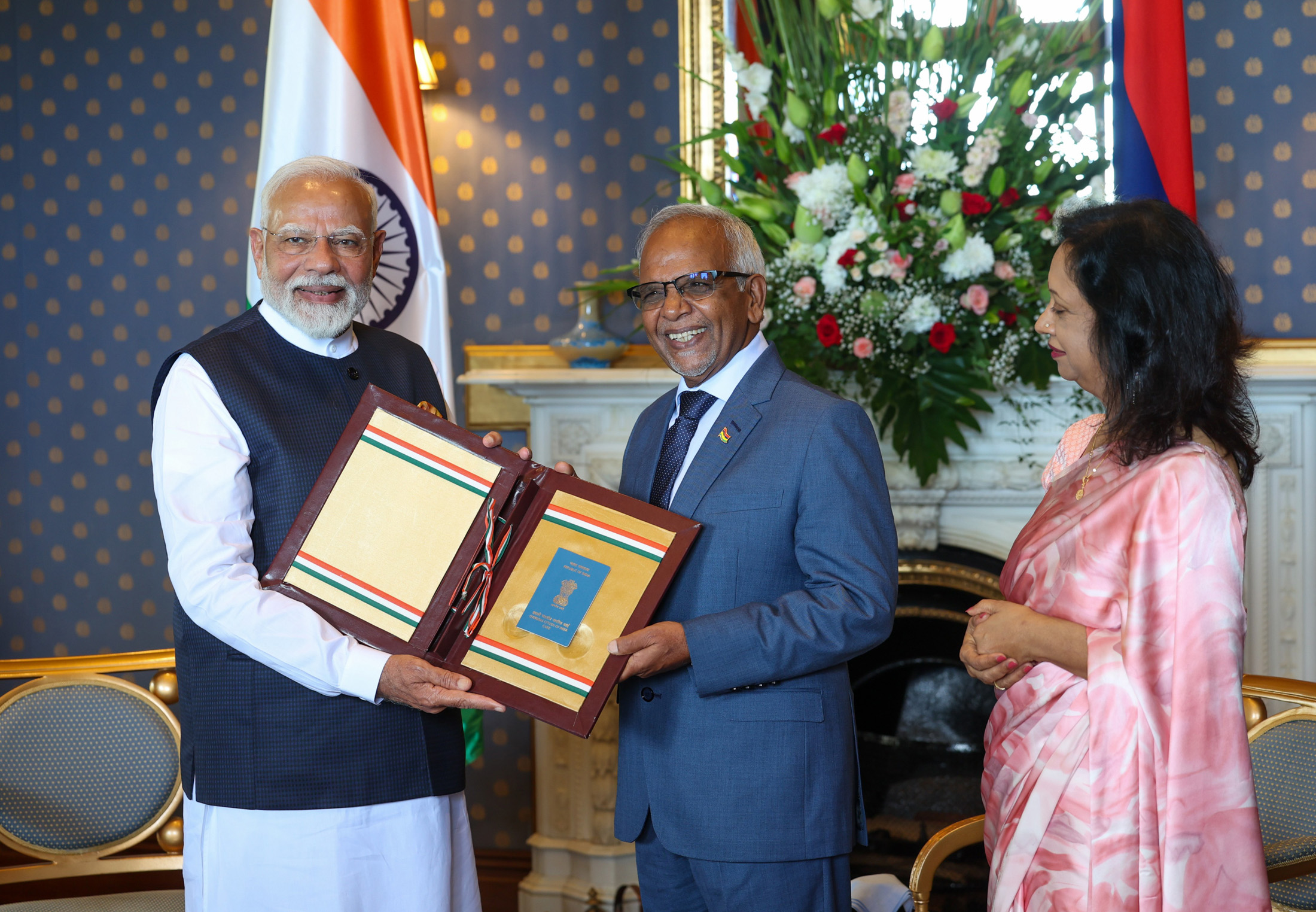
Modi hands over Gokhool an OCI card.

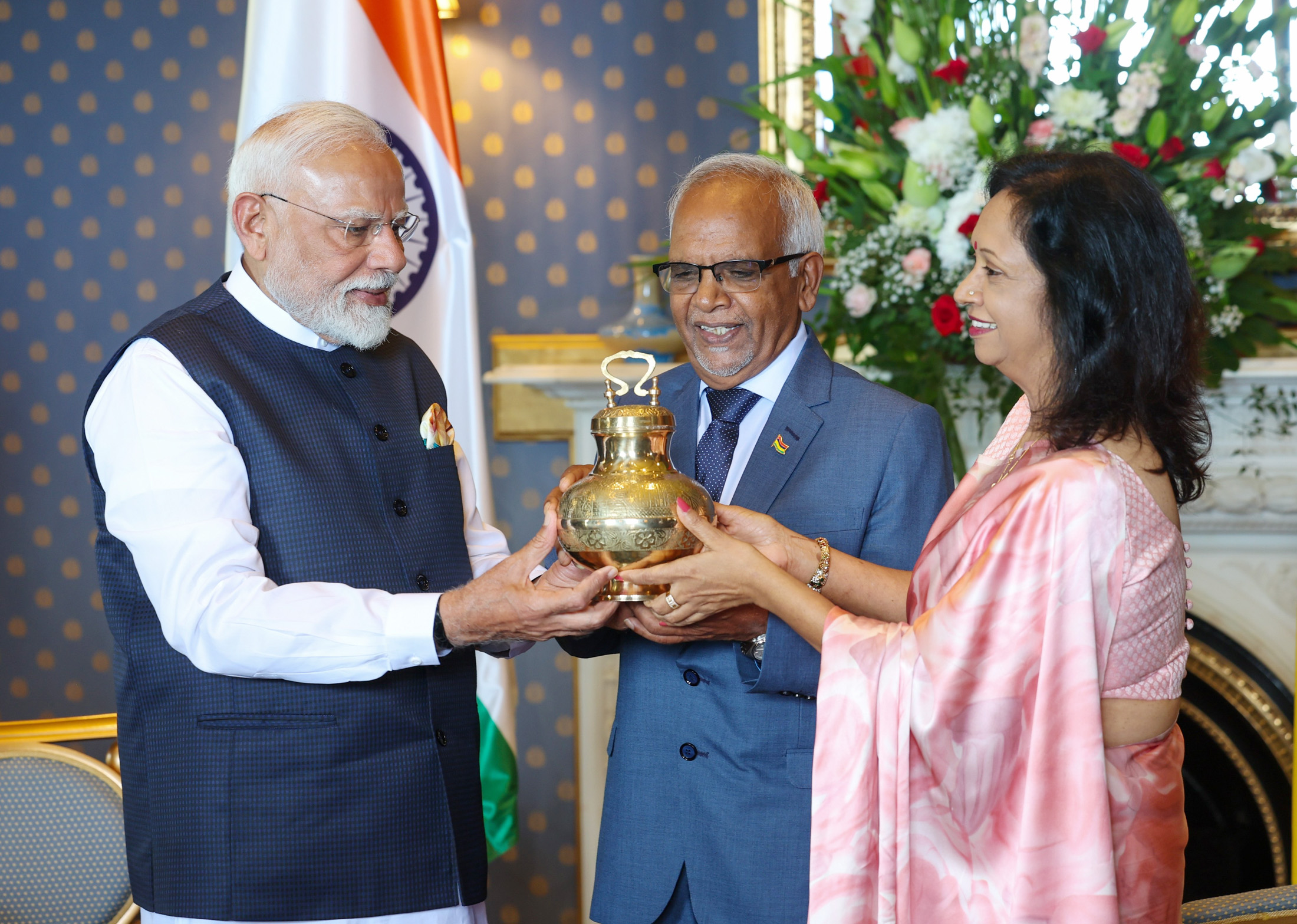
Modi hands over Gokhool gangajal.

As President, his role is largely ceremonial and constitutional, since executive power in Mauritius rests with the Prime Minister and Cabinet. Gokhool has emphasised themes of education, unity, and equality, pledging to serve as a guardian of the Constitution and a unifying presence for all Mauritians. He officially took the oath of office on 7 December 2024 at the State House, Reduit, in a ceremony attended by the Prime Minister, Cabinet members, opposition leaders, and representatives of various socio-cultural organisations and awarded as the Grand Commander of the Order of the Star and Key of the Indian Ocean. In the same session, Robert Hungley was elected as his vice president.

On 11 March 2025, Indian PM Narendra Modi met Mauritian President Dharam Gokhool during an official state visit to Mauritius, a meeting that underscored the historic, cultural, and strategic partnership between the two nations. At a ceremonial event in Port Louis, President Gokhool conferred on Modi the Grand Commander of the Order of the Star and Key of the Indian Ocean (GCSK), Mauritius’s highest civilian honor, in recognition of his role in strengthening bilateral ties. The meeting symbolised the shared heritage of India and Mauritius, rooted in the large Indian-origin community on the island, while also reaffirming commitments to cooperation in trade, education, maritime security, and cultural exchange. For President Gokhool, presiding over the ceremony was also significant, as it reflected Mauritius’s continuing role as a bridge between Africa and India, while for Modi, the honor marked a deepening of India’s influence in the Indian Ocean region.During his visit, Modi also visited the State House and gifted Gokhool gangajal from the 2025 Prayag Maha Kumbh Mela, makhana, and an OCI card. Dharam Gokhool also showed Narendra Modi the Ayurvedic garden at the State House. PM Navin Ramgoolam also attended the State House.

== Awards and decorations ==
- Mauritius:
  - Grand Commander of the Order of the Star and Key of the Indian Ocean
- France:
  - Grand Officer of the Legion of Honour (22 November 2025)

== See also ==
- Chamar
- Ravived
- Ravidassia
- Guru Ravidass
- Sant Haralayya
- Madara Chennaiah

Political offices
Preceded by Louis Steven Obeegadoo	Minister of Education and Human Resources; 2005–2008	Succeeded by Vasant Bunwaree
Preceded by Rajesh Jeetah as Minister of Industry	Minister of Industry, Science and Research; 2008–2010	Succeeded by Showkutally Soodhun as Minister of Industry
Preceded by Rajesh Jeetah as Minister of Industry	Minister of Industry, Science and Research; 2008–2010	Succeeded by Rajesh Jeetah as Minister of Science and Research
Preceded by Prithvirajsing Roopun	President of Mauritius; 2024–present	Incumbent
