= President of Mauritius =

Head of state

President of the Republic of Mauritius
- Président de la République de Maurice
- Presidential coat of arms

- Presidential standard of Mauritius

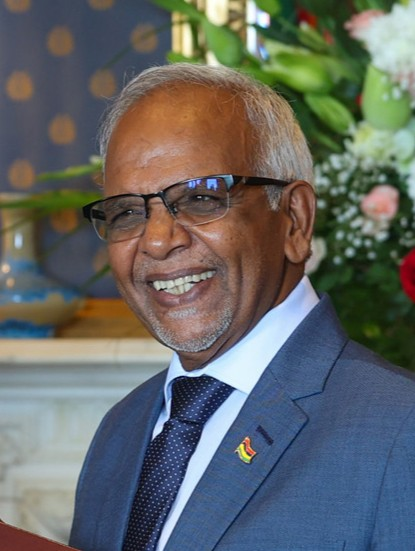
- Incumbent; Dharam Gokhool since 6 December 2024
- Style: His Excellency
- Residence: State House (Official)
- Nominator: Elected by members of the National Assembly on a motion made by the Prime Minister
- Term length: Five years, renewable once
- Constituting instrument: Constitution of Mauritius (1968)
- Inaugural holder: Sir Veerasamy Ringadoo
- Formation: 12 March 1992; 34 years ago
- Deputy: Vice-President of Mauritius
- Salary: ₨ 3,740,000
- Website: Official website

The president of the Republic of Mauritius (French: Président de la République de Maurice) is the head of state of the Republic of Mauritius. Mauritius is a parliamentary republic, and the president functions as a ceremonial figurehead, elected by the National Assembly as set out by the Constitution of Mauritius. The current office-holder is Dharam Gokhool. He was elected by the National Assembly on 6 December 2024. The president's official residence is the State House.

== Overview ==
Mauritius is a parliamentary republic. The prime minister is the head of government, while the president is the head of state and commander-in-chief. The president is required to uphold and defend the Constitution of Mauritius and ensure that the institutions of democracy and rule of law are protected, the fundamental rights of all are respected and the unity of the diverse Mauritian nation is maintained and strengthened. Whilst in office, the president should not hold any other office of emolument, whether under the Constitution or otherwise and exercise any profession or calling or engage in any trade or business.

The president is obliged to suspend his (or her) membership in any political party for the term in office. Upon assuming office, the authority and duties of the president in all other elected or appointed offices terminate automatically. These measures should theoretically help the president to function in a more independent and impartial manner.

The power of Parliament to make laws shall be exercisable by bills passed by the Assembly and assented to by the president. When a bill is submitted to the president for assent by the Constitution, he shall signify that he assents or that he withholds assent. In the exercise of his functions, the president shall act by the advice of the Cabinet or of a minister acting under the general authority of the Cabinet except in cases where he is required by the Constitution to act by the advice of, or after consultation with, any person or authority other than the Cabinet or in his deliberate judgment.

According to Chapter VI, section 58 of the constitution executive authority of Mauritius is vested in the president, and that authority may be exercised by the president either directly or through officers subordinate to him.

The prime minister shall keep the President fully informed concerning the general conduct of the government of Mauritius and shall furnish the president with such information as he may request concerning any particular matter relating to the government of Mauritius.

The president serves as chancellor of the Order of the Star and Key of the Indian Ocean, the highest distinct order of merit of Mauritius. The president, on the recommendation of the prime minister, announces the list of honorees and personally decorates them. The ceremony is held on 12 March each year.

The office of the president has the mission to assist the president of the Republic in his duties to preserve, protect and defend the Constitution and promote national unity.

The president makes a number of important public speeches and statements each year. The most notable of these are the annual New Year’s Speech on 1 January, and the speech at the opening of each annual session of Parliament.

== Historical background ==
The office of president was created on 12 March 1992 after Mauritius became a republic, 24 years to the day after it had gained independence. It replaced the office of governor general which was representative of the Queen of Mauritius, Elizabeth II. The office of governor-general was occupied by Sir Dayandranath Burrenchobay, Sir Seewoosagur Ramgoolam and Sir Veerasamy Ringadoo was governor-general from 1986 to 11 March 1992, he became the first president of the republic on 12 March 1992 and left office on 30 June 1992. Cassam Uteem was elected as the president in 1992 and 1997, he held office from 30 June 1992 and resigned on 15 February 2002 in protest at a controversial anti-terrorism bill which the government wanted signed into law. Angidi Chettiar who was the vice president of Mauritius held the office as acting president on 15 February 2002, he resigned after two days. Ariranga Pillay became acting president from 18 February 2002 to 25 February 2002. Karl Offmann was elected in 2002, he held office from 25 February 2002 and resigned on 1 October 2003. Raouf Bundhun became acting president from 1 October 2003 to 7 October 2003.

Sir Anerood Jugnauth was elected in 2003. Taking office on 7 October 2003, he was re-elected in 2008. In March 2012, Sir Anerood criticised the government, saying that the economy had entered a vicious circle of economic loss and the population was suffering. The prime minister Navin Ramgoolam said that the presidency was an apolitical office and invited him to join the political arena. SAJ resigned on 31 March 2012 and made his comeback in politics, he took the lead of his former party Militant Socialist Movement (MSM) which just break it alliance with the Labour party and left the government because of corruption accusation, the Medpoint Scandal. After the return of Sir Anerood, the MSM concluded an alliance with the opposition party Mauritian Militant Movement.

Monique Ohsan Bellepeau The then–vice president acted as president from 31 March 2012 to 21 July 2012. Kailash Purryag was elected as the fifth president of Mauritius by members of the National Assembly on Friday 20 July.

Monique Ohsan Bellepeau again acted as president from 1 June 2015 to 5 June 2015 prior to the inauguration of Ameenah Gurib-Fakim. She is the first woman to ever hold the title of president of Mauritius. Her ascendancy to the presidency was facilitated by a constitutional conundrum that had gripped Mauritius since Alliance L’Avenir came to power in 2010. In 2014, the Alliance L’Avenir entered into an agreement with the Alliance L’Avenir on the basis of constitutional reform which would have seen Mauritius turning into a semi-presidential state where the president would be conferred the power of dissolution, having a direct role in shaping foreign policy and, chairing government meetings. In December 2014, voters rejected the proposals to give the president greater powers.

== Selection process ==
=== Eligibility ===
The President must have been at least 40 years old and have resided in Mauritius for at least 5 years immediately preceding the election.

=== Election ===
According to Chapter IV Section 28 of the Constitution of Mauritius, the president shall be elected by the National Assembly on a motion made by the prime minister and supported by the votes of a majority of all the members Assembly. The term of office is 5 years. The motion shall not be the subject matter of any debate in the Assembly. The office of the president shall become vacant after the expiry of his term of office, where he dies or resigns his office by writing addressed to the Assembly and delivered to the speaker or where he is removed or suspended from office under section 30 of the Constitution. After the expiry of his term, the president shall continue to hold office until another person assumes office as president. When the office of president is vacant, or the president is absent from Mauritius or is for any other reason unable to perform the functions of his office, those functions shall be performed by the vice president, if there is no vice president, one should be elected and allowed to perform the functions of the president by the chief justice.

As of 2021, there is a two-term limit for the president in the Constitution of Mauritius. The first president for whom the term limits applied was Cassam Uteem in 2002.

=== Oath of office ===
A person elected to the office of president shall, before assuming his functions, take and subscribe to the appropriate oath as set out in the Third Schedule of the Constitution of Mauritius. The oath shall be administered by the chief justice.

I, ...................................., do swear (or solemnly affirm) that I will faithfully execute the office of President (or Vice President or Acting President) and will, to the best of my ability without favour or prejudice, defend the Constitution, and the institutions of democracy and the rule of law, ensure that the fundamental rights are protected and the unity of the diverse Mauritian nation maintained and strengthened

== Succession ==
In the event of a vacancy the vice president serves as acting president, and in case of vacancy in the vice presidency, the chief justice of Mauritius will serve as acting president.

== See also ==
- List of heads of state of Mauritius
- First Lady of Mauritius
- Vice President of Mauritius
- Governor-General of Mauritius
- Prime Minister of Mauritius
- Government of Mauritius
