= Vice-President of Mauritius =

Second-highest office of the Republic of Mauritius

- Vice-Président de Maurice
- Coat of arms of Mauritius

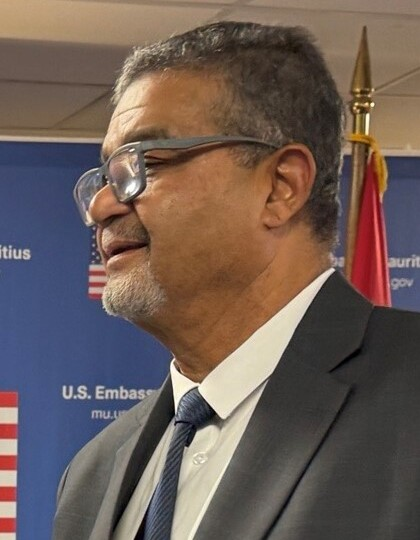
- Incumbent; Robert Hungley since 7 December 2024
- Style: His Excellency
- Nominator: Prime Minister
- Appointer: National Assembly
- Term length: 5 years, renewable indefinitely
- Formation: 1992
- Salary: ₨ 2,500,000
- Website: Vice-President of Mauritius

The vice-president of the Republic of Mauritius (French: Vice-Président de la République de Maurice) is the second-highest office of the Republic of Mauritius, after the president. Because Mauritius is a parliamentary republic, the vice-president functions as a ceremonial figurehead, elected by the National Assembly, as set out by the Constitution of Mauritius.

== Overview ==
In the event of the death, resignation or removal of the president, the vice-president becomes acting president. The vice-president nevertheless cannot succeed to the presidency in case of dismissal, resignation or death of the head of state but he can be nominated by the parliament to succeed to the president and if elected, the term will start for a full mandate of five years.

== List of vice-presidents ==
A list of vice-presidents, since Mauritius became a republic on 12 March 1992.

No.	Portrait	Name (birth–death)	Election	Tenure			Political party
No.	Portrait	Name (birth–death)	Election	Took office	Left office	Time in office	Political party
1		Rabindrah Ghurburrun (1928–2008)	1992	1 July 1992	30 June 1997	4 years, 364 days	MSM
2		Angidi Chettiar (1928–2010)	1997	1 July 1997	17 February 2002	4 years, 231 days	PTr
3		Raouf Bundhun (born 1937)	2002	8 March 2002	24 August 2007	5 years, 169 days	MMM
(2)		Angidi Chettiar (1928–2010)	2007	25 August 2007	15 September 2010^{[†]}	3 years, 21 days	PTr
4		Monique Ohsan Bellepeau (born 1942)	2010	13 November 2010	3 April 2016	5 years, 142 days	PTr
5		Barlen Vyapoory (born 1945)	2016	4 April 2016	25 November 2019	3 years, 235 days	MSM
6		Eddy Boissézon (1952–2025)	2019	2 December 2019	7 December 2024	5 years, 5 days	ML
7		Robert Hungley (born 1957)	2024	7 December 2024	Incumbent	1 year, 318 days	MMM

^{†} Died in office

== See also ==
- President of Mauritius
- Prime Minister of Mauritius
- Deputy Prime Minister of Mauritius
- Vice-Prime Minister of Mauritius
- Government of Mauritius
- Governor of Mauritius
