= Order of the Star and Key of the Indian Ocean =

Order of merit in Mauritius

- Type: Order of merit
- Country: Mauritius
- Motto: Stella Clavisque Maris Indici (translated: Star and key of the Indian Ocean)
- Awarded for: At the President's pleasure
- Status: Currently constituted
- Chancellor: President of the Republic of Mauritius
- Grades: Grand Commander (GCSK); Grand Officer (GOSK); Commander (CSK); Officer (OSK); Member (MSK)

Precedence
- Next (higher): None
- Next (lower): President's Distinguished Service Medal
- Ribbon bar of GCSK, GOSK, CSK Ribbon bar of OSK, MSK

The Most Distinguished Order of the Star and Key of the Indian Ocean is the highest distinct order of merit in the honours system of Mauritius established under the National Awards Act 1993. It was founded in 1992 to decorate people who have made a contribution to social progress in the nations of the Indian Ocean. It may be awarded to non-Mauritian citizens.

== Chancellor ==
The chancellor of the order is the President of the Republic of Mauritius. Each year on Independence day (12 March) the president of the republic appoints new members on the recommendation of the prime minister.

Labour Day has a special significance to the order as it relates to the hardship of people working for their country. On Labour Day 2007 the Malagasy President Marc Ravalomanana was appointed to the rank of Grand Commander, the highest rank of the order.

== Privileges ==
Recipients of the rank of Grand Officer or above are automatically entitled to prefix The Hon, Hons or The Honourable to their name. Commanders and Officers may request permission from the president to use this prefix.

Recipients of the order who are not Mauritian citizens may not use the prefix or post-nominals unless granted permission by the president.

== Composition ==
The Order comprises five classes, in descending order of seniority:

- Grand Commander of the Order of the Star and Key of the Indian Ocean (GCSK)
- Grand Officer of the Order of the Star and Key of the Indian Ocean (GOSK)
- Commander of the Order of the Star and Key of the Indian Ocean (CSK)
- Officer of the Order of the Star and Key of the Indian Ocean (OSK)
- Member of the Order of the Star and Key of the Indian Ocean (MSK)

== Composition of the medal ==
GRAND OFFICER OF THE ORDER OF THE STAR AND KEY OF THE INDIAN OCEAN

The decoration shall be 3 mm thick in the form of a cross and made up of a circular central part and three sets of leaves: outer, middle, inner.

The outer leaves shall be of gold. The length from tip to tip of the outer leaves shall be 71mm.

The middle leaves shall be made of violet blue enamel (Group 98 Col of the Royal Horticultural Society colour chart), have pointed ends capped by beads, and be lined externally with gold 2mm thick. The length from head to bead (external) shall be 76 mm.

The inner leaves shall be in the shape of a cross with equal arms of blue enamel (Group 100D of the same colour chart) lined externally with gold 1mm thick. The length from tip to tip of the inner leaves shall be 65 mm.

The central part shall depict a ring of gold with outer diameter 26mm and inner diameter 20mm.

ON THE OBVERSE, to fit inside the ring, shall be embossed a Trochetia boutoniana flower in gold and on the ring the words GRAND OFFICER OF THE STAR & KEY.

ON THE REVERSE inside the ring, shall be embossed the coat of arms of the Republic of Mauritius and on the ring the words REPUBLIC OF MAURITIUS.

The clasp shall be of gold.

The decoration shall be worn around the neck by a ribbon of old gold colour (yellow group 11 C of the same colour chart) 70 mm wide with the colours of the flag of Mauritius running vertically in the middle in segments each 4 mm wide.

The colours of the flag (from left to right) shall be as per the following British Standard Colour Code:

Red - 0.005
Blue - 7.086
Yellow - 0.001
Green - 0.010

== Recipients ==
Grand Commanders of the Order of the Star and Key of the Indian Ocean (GCSK)

Name	Post-Nominals	Year Appointed	Nationality
Cassam Uteem	GCSK	1993	Mauritius
Karl Offmann	GCSK	2002	Mauritius
Sir Anerood Jugnauth	KCMG, GCSK, QC, PC	2003	Mauritius
Paul Bérenger	GCSK	2003	Mauritius
Louis Serge Clair	GCSK	2003	Mauritius
Premnath Ramnah	GCSK	2004	Mauritius
Rameswurlall Basant Roi	GCSK	2004	Mauritius
Jaya Krishna Cuttaree	GCSK	2005	Mauritius
Sir Satcam Boolell (posthumous)	GCSK, Kt	2006	Mauritius
Rashid Beebeejaun	GCSK, GOSK	2007	Mauritius
Sir Ramesh Jeewoolall	GCSK, Kt	2007	Mauritius
Marc Ravalomanana	GCSK	2008	Madagascar
Navin Ramgoolam	GCSK	2008	Mauritius
Xavier-Luc Duval	GCSK	2009	Mauritius
Kailash Purryag	GCSK	2009	Mauritius
Rama Sithanen	GCSK	2009	Mauritius
James Burty David (posthumous)	GCSK	2010	Mauritius
Mohamed Nasheed	GCSK	2011	Maldives
James Michel	GCSK	2012	Seychelles
Roshi Bhadain	GCSK	2016	Mauritius
The Most Reverend Ian Ernest	GCSK	2019	Mauritius
Philippe Sands	GCSK	2021	United Kingdom
Jagdish Koonjul	GCSK	2021	Mauritius
Sooroojdev Phokeer	GSCK	2021	Mauritius
Vaco Baissac	GSCK	2023	Mauritius
Dharam Gokhool	GCSK	2024	Mauritius
Harvesh Kumar Seegolam	GCSK	2024	Mauritius
Narendra Modi	GCSK	2025	India
Emmanuel Macron	GCSK	2025	France

Grand Officers of the Order of the Star and Key of the Indian Ocean (GOSK)

Name	Post-Nominals	Year Appointed
Sooroojdev Phokeer	GOSK	2016
Jagdish Koonjul	GOSK	2016
The Hon Mookhesswur Choonee	GOSK	2014
The Hon Satya Veyash Faugoo	GOSK	2014
Mr Bahim Jeetoo	GOSK	2014
Mrs Soonita Kistamah	GOSK	2014
Mrs Marie Madeleine Lee	GOSK	2014
Mr Dharam Dev Manraj	GOSK	2014
Mr Marie Joseph Raymond Marrier d’Unienville, Q.C.	GOSK	2014
Dr Sulleman Moreea	GOSK	2014
Mr Marie Jacques Laval Panglose	GOSK	2014
Dr Keyvoobalam Pauvaday	GOSK	2014
Mr Geerja Shankar Ramdaursingh	GOSK	2014
Mr Rohit Ramnawaz	GOSK	2014
Mr Georges André Robert	GOSK	2014
Dr Georges Tsang Kwong Hong	GOSK	2014
Mrs Lalita Balgobin	GOSK	2013
Ahmud Ally Beebeejaun	GOSK	2013
Ved Prakash Bundhun	GOSK	2013
Mahmood Cheeroo	GOSK	2013
Piero Augusto Colonna	GOSK	2013
Rohit Narainsing Guttee	GOSK	2013
Dr Rihun Raj Hawoldar	GOSK	2013
Marc Raymond Hein	GOSK	2013
Ashok Kumar Jai Krishen Kalachand	GOSK	2013
Philippe Li Wan Po	GOSK	2013
Mrs Sooryakanti Nirsimloo-Gayan	GOSK	2013
Rivaltz Quenette	GOSK	2013
Kaleshwarao Saccaram	GOSK	2013
Dr Sattianathan Sangeelee	GOSK	2013
Soopramanien Sooprayen	GOSK	2013
Eddy Boissézon	GOSK	2019
Anil Kumarsing Dip	GOSK	2024
Robert Hungley	GOSK	2024
Jean-Raymond Boulle	GOSK	2026
