= Ministry of Energy and Public Utilities =

Government ministry of Mauritius

- Ministère de l’Énergie et des Services publics

Agency overview
- Formed: 1974
- Jurisdiction: Government of Mauritius
- Headquarters: Air Mauritius Centre, John Kennedy Street, Port Louis
- Minister responsible: Patrick Assirvaden, Minister
- Website: publicutilities.govmu.org

The Ministry of Energy and Public Utilities is a ministry in the government of Mauritius responsible for the area of energy, water and wastewater sectors, radiation safety and nuclear security and formulation of policies and strategies within those areas.

The current minister responsible is Patrick Assirvaden, who has served since November 2024 under the current government of Navin Ramgoolam.

== History ==
The ministry was first formed in 1974 as the Ministry of Power, Fuel and Energy. From 1982 until 1996, the ministry was mainly known with the portfolio title of Energy. Afterwards, it was renamed to the Ministry of Public Utilities until 2006, when the ministry's name was modified to Renewable Energy and Public Utilities. Since 2010, the name was modified to Energy and Public Utilities to which the ministry is now known as.

== Organisation ==
=== Departments ===
The ministry is divided between the following departments:

- Energy Efficiency Management Office (EEMO) - responsible for promoting energy efficiency
- Radiation Safety and Nuclear Security Authority (RSNSA) - responsible for regulating ionising radiation and nuclear security
- Water Resources Unit (WRU) - responsible for mobilising and developing water resources

=== Parastatal bodies ===
Under the ministry, it is responsible for overseeing the following parastatal bodies:

- Central Electricity Board (CEB)
- Central Water Authority (CWA)
- Wastewater Management Authority (WMA)
- Mauritius Renewable Energy Agency (MARENA)
- Utility Regulatory Authority (URA)

== List of ministers ==
Portrait	Name	Term of office			Portfolio name	Party	Prime minister	Ref.
Portrait	Name	Took office	Left office	Time in office	Portfolio name	Party	Prime minister	Ref.
	Raymond Devienne	2 February 1974	June; 1976	2 years, 118 days	Power, Fuel and Energy	PTr	S. Ramgoolam	
	Raouf Bundhun	June; 1976	27 December 1976	209 days	Power, Fuel and Energy	CAM	S. Ramgoolam	
	Kanchandraseeh Busawon	27 December 1976	15 June 1982	5 years, 170 days	Power, Fuel and Energy	PTr	S. Ramgoolam	
	Swalay Kasenally	15 June 1982	22 March 1983	280 days	Energy and Communications	MMM	A. Jugnauth	
	Mahen Utchanah	28 March 1983	24 September 1990	11 years, 215 days	Energy and Communications	MMM	A. Jugnauth	
	Mahen Utchanah	28 March 1983	24 September 1990	11 years, 215 days	Energy and Communications	MSM	A. Jugnauth	
	Mahen Utchanah	24 September 1990	29 October 1994	11 years, 215 days	Energy, Water Resources and Postal Services	MSM	A. Jugnauth	
	Swalay Kasenally	15 November 1994	22 December 1995	1 year, 37 days	Energy, Water Resources and Postal Services	RMM	A. Jugnauth	
	Deva Virahsawmy	30 December 1995	30 November 1996	2 years, 299 days	Energy and Water Resources	PTr	N. Ramgoolam	
	Deva Virahsawmy	30 November 1996	2 July 1997	2 years, 299 days	Local Government and Public Utilities	PTr	N. Ramgoolam	
	Deva Virahsawmy	2 July 1997	25 October 1998	2 years, 299 days	Public Utilities	PTr	N. Ramgoolam	
	Rashid Beebeejaun	25 October 1998	15 September 2000	1 year, 326 days	Public Utilities	PTr	N. Ramgoolam	
	Alan Ganoo	18 September 2000	5 July 2005	4 years, 290 days	Public Utilities	MMM	A. Jugnauth	
	Alan Ganoo	18 September 2000	5 July 2005	4 years, 290 days	Public Utilities	MMM	Bérenger	
	Abu Kasenally	7 July 2005	19 September 2008	3 years, 74 days	Public Utilities	PTr	N. Ramgoolam	
	Rashid Beebeejaun	19 September 2008	11 May 2010	6 years, 85 days	Renewable Energy and Public Utilities	PTr	N. Ramgoolam	
	Rashid Beebeejaun	11 May 2010	13 December 2014	6 years, 85 days	Energy and Public Utilities	PTr	N. Ramgoolam	
	Ivan Collendavelloo	15 December 2014	25 June 2020	5 years, 193 days	Energy and Public Utilities	ML	A. Jugnauth	
	Ivan Collendavelloo	15 December 2014	25 June 2020	5 years, 193 days	Energy and Public Utilities	ML	P. Jugnauth	
	Joe Lesjongard	25 June 2020	12 November 2024	4 years, 140 days	Energy and Public Utilities	MSM	P. Jugnauth	
	Patrick Assirvaden	22 November 2024	Incumbent	1 year, 259 days	Energy and Public Utilities	PTr	N. Ramgoolam	
