= Deputy Prime Minister of Mauritius =

Senior member of the Cabinet of Mauritius

- Premier Ministre adjoint de Maurice
- Coat of arms of Mauritius

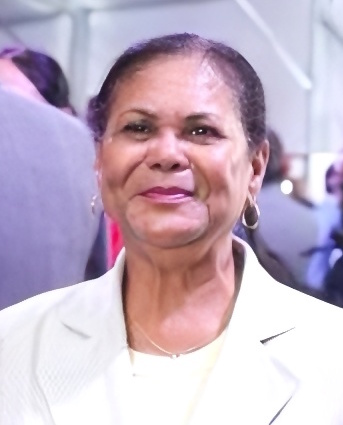
- Incumbent; Arianne Navarre-Marie since 4 May 2026
- Style: The Honourable
- Nominator: Prime Minister of Mauritius
- Appointer: President of Mauritius
- Term length: At the president's pleasure
- Inaugural holder: Harish Boodhoo
- Formation: 2 July 1982; 44 years ago
- Salary: ₨ 2,376,000 per year

The deputy prime minister of Mauritius (French: Premier ministre adjoint) is a senior member of the Cabinet of Mauritius. The deputy prime minister is the first in line to succeed the prime minister on a temporary basis in case the latter is out of the country, sick, resigns or dies suddenly. The office has existed before on an informal basis until its formal establishment under an amendment to the constitution in 1982. Harish Boodhoo became the first person to hold the office in July 1982.

The office is currently held by Arianne Navarre-Marie, who was appointed on 4 May 2026 and became the first female deputy prime minister.

== Constitutional position and duties ==
Under the Constitution of Mauritius, it provides for the establishment of the offices of prime minister and deputy prime minister, who are to be appointed by the president on the advice of the prime minister.

The deputy prime minister is the first person to hold the office of prime minister and head of government in case the latter is absent from Mauritius or is by reason of illness or of section 60(5) unable to perform the functions conferred on him by the Constitution. The president, by directions in writing, authorize the deputy prime minister or, in his absence, some other minister to perform those functions and that minister may perform those functions (acting prime minister) until his authority is revoked by the president. Before the establishment of the office in 1982, the constitution dictated that any minister appointed by the Governor-General is authorised to exercise the functions of the office of prime minister until the Governor-General revokes such authority.

Under convention, the deputy prime minister is always chosen from the second-most senior member of the government, typically the leader of second largest party under a coalition government. Although in the late 1980s, it became common for the prime minister to appoint honorary deputy prime ministers in addition to the existing holder of the constitutional deputy prime minister and holders of the office were usually senior members of the cabinet or another junior member party of the coalition government.

=== Title ===
Constitutionally, the office is referred to as Deputy Prime Minister under the 1982 amendment that established the office. No formal legislation acknowledges or recognises an official French-translation for the office since English is the official language of law in Mauritius.

However, it was common to refer to the deputy prime minister in French-speaking media as vice-Premiére ministre and in English-speaking media as Vice Prime Minister or Deputy Prime Minister until the establishment of the separate office of Vice-Prime Minister in 2008. Hence, the deputy prime minister is referred nowadays in French-speaking media as Premiére ministre adjoint or simply referring to its English title whilst maintaining the French translation used before for the office of deputy prime minister instead to the Vice-Prime Minister.

== Oath ==
According to section 67 of the Constitution of Mauritius, ministers are required to subscribe to the oath of allegiance and an oath of office before assuming their respective offices. The current text as outlined in the third schedule of the Constitution takes in the following form:

I, [name], being appointed Deputy Prime Minister, do swear (or solemnly affirm) that I will to the best of my judgment, at all times when so required, freely give my counsel and advice to the President (or any other person for the time being lawfully performing the functions of that office) for the good management of the public affairs of Mauritius, and I do further swear (or solemnly affirm) that I will not on any account, at any time whatsoever, disclose the counsel, advice, opinion or vote of any particular Minister, Senior Minister or Junior Minister and that I will not, except with the authority of the Cabinet and to such extent as may be required for the good management of the affairs of Mauritius, directly or indirectly reveal the business or proceedings of the Deputy Prime Minister or any matter coming to my knowledge in my capacity as such and that in all things I will be a true and faithful Deputy Prime Minister. (So help me God.)

== List of deputy prime ministers ==
=== Deputy prime ministers (constitutional) ===
Portrait	Name	Term of office			Concurrent portfolio(s)	Party	Prime minister	Ref.
Portrait	Name	Took office	Left office	Time in office	Concurrent portfolio(s)	Party	Prime minister	Ref.
	Harish Boodhoo (born 1946)	2 July 1982	21 August 1983	1 year, 50 days	Information and Cooperatives	PSM	A. Jugnauth	
	Sir Gaëtan Duval (1930–1996)	21 August 1983	4 September 1987	4 years, 357 days	Attorney-General; Justice (1983–1986); Employment and Tourism (1986–1987)	PMSD	A. Jugnauth	
	Sir Gaëtan Duval (1930–1996)	4 September 1987	12 August 1988	4 years, 357 days	Employment and Tourism	PMSD	A. Jugnauth	
	Sir Satcam Boolell (1920–2006)	15 August 1988	18 August 1990	2 years, 3 days	External Affairs and Emigration; Attorney-General and Justice	PTr	A. Jugnauth	
	Prem Nababsing (1940–2017)	25 September 1990	27 September 1991	5 years, 88 days	Health	MMM	A. Jugnauth	
	Prem Nababsing (1940–2017)	27 September 1991	22 December 1995	5 years, 88 days	Health (1990–1993)	MMM	A. Jugnauth	
	Prem Nababsing (1940–2017)	27 September 1991	22 December 1995	5 years, 88 days	Economic Planning and Development (1993–1995); Internal and External Communications (1994–1995); Information (1994–1995)	RMM	A. Jugnauth	
	Paul Bérenger (born 1945)	30 December 1995	20 June 1997	1 year, 172 days	Foreign Affairs, International and Regional Co-operation	MMM	N. Ramgoolam	
	Kailash Purryag (1947–2025)	2 July 1997	16 September 2000	3 years, 76 days	Foreign Affairs and International Trade	PTr	N. Ramgoolam	
	Paul Bérenger (born 1945)	17 September 2000	30 September 2003	3 years, 13 days	Finance	MMM	A. Jugnauth	
	Pravind Jugnauth (born 1961)	30 September 2003	5 July 2005	1 year, 278 days	Finance and Economic Development; Agriculture, Food Technology and Natural Resources (2000–2003)	MSM	Bérenger	
	Rashid Beebeejaun (born 1934)	7 July 2005	10 May 2010	9 years, 159 days	Public Infrastructure, Land Transport and Shipping (2005–2008); Renewable Energy and Public Utilities (2008–2010)	PTr	N. Ramgoolam	
	Rashid Beebeejaun (born 1934)	10 May 2010	13 December 2014	9 years, 159 days	Energy and Public Utilities	PTr	N. Ramgoolam	
	Xavier-Luc Duval (born 1958)	15 December 2014	19 December 2016	2 years, 4 days	Tourism and External Communications	PMSD	A. Jugnauth	
	Ivan Collendavelloo (born 1950)	20 December 2016	23 January 2017	3 years, 188 days	Energy and Public Utilities; Tourism	ML	A. Jugnauth	
	Ivan Collendavelloo (born 1950)	23 January 2017	12 November 2019	3 years, 188 days	Energy and Public Utilities	ML	P. Jugnauth	
	Ivan Collendavelloo (born 1950)	12 November 2019	25 June 2020	3 years, 188 days	Energy and Public Utilities	ML	P. Jugnauth	
	Steven Obeegadoo (born 1961)	25 June 2020	12 November 2024	4 years, 140 days	Housing and Land Use Planning; Tourism	PM	P. Jugnauth	
	Paul Bérenger (born 1945)	22 November 2024	20 March 2026	1 year, 118 days	Minister without portfolio	MMM	N. Ramgoolam	
	Arianne Navarre-Marie (born 1961)	4 May 2026	Incumbent	170 days	Gender Equality and Family Welfare	MMM	N. Ramgoolam	

=== Deputy prime ministers (honorary) ===
Portrait	Name	Term of office			Concurrent portfolio(s)	Party	Prime minister	Ref.
Portrait	Name	Took office	Left office	Time in office	Concurrent portfolio(s)	Party	Prime minister	Ref.
	Sir Abdool Razack Mohamed (1906–1978)	12 March 1968	20 December 1976	8 years, 283 days	Housing, Lands and Town and Country Planning	CAM	S. Ramgoolam	
	Sir Satcam Boolell (1920–2006)	8 August 1986	15 August 1988	2 years, 7 days	External Affairs and Emigration; Attorney-General and Justice	PTr	A. Jugnauth	
	Vishnu Lutchmeenaraidoo (born 1944)	30 September 1986	4 September 1987	3 years, 322 days	Finance	MSM	A. Jugnauth	
	Vishnu Lutchmeenaraidoo (born 1944)	4 September 1987	18 August 1990	3 years, 322 days	Finance	MSM	A. Jugnauth	
	Beergoonath Ghurburrun (1928–2013)	15 August 1988	5 August 1991	2 years, 355 days	Planning and Economic Development (from 1984)	PTr	A. Jugnauth	
	Cassam Uteem (born 1941)	25 September 1990	27 September 1991	1 year, 2 days	Economic Planning and Development; Industry and Industrial Technology	MMM	A. Jugnauth	
	Xavier-Luc Duval (born 1958)	7 July 2005	20 September 2008	3 years, 75 days	Tourism, Leisure and External Communications	PMSD	N. Ramgoolam	
	Rama Sithanen (born 1954)	7 July 2005	20 September 2008	3 years, 75 days	Finance and Economic Development	PTr	N. Ramgoolam	

== See also ==
- President of Mauritius
- Prime Minister of Mauritius
- Vice-Prime Minister of Mauritius
- Leader of the Opposition (Mauritius)
- Government of Mauritius
