= 1995 Mauritian general election =

- 20 December 1995

All 62 directly elected seats in the National Assembly (and up to 8 BLS seats)
- Turnout: 79.40% (▼6.01 pp)
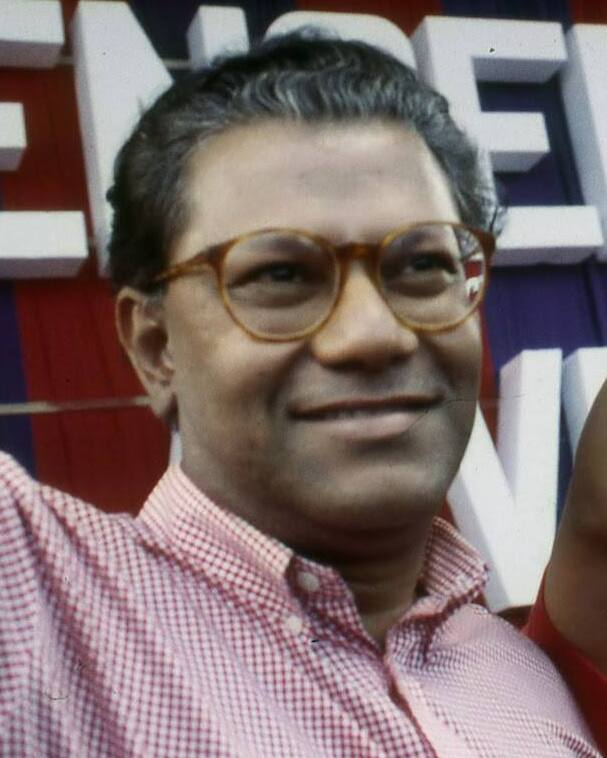

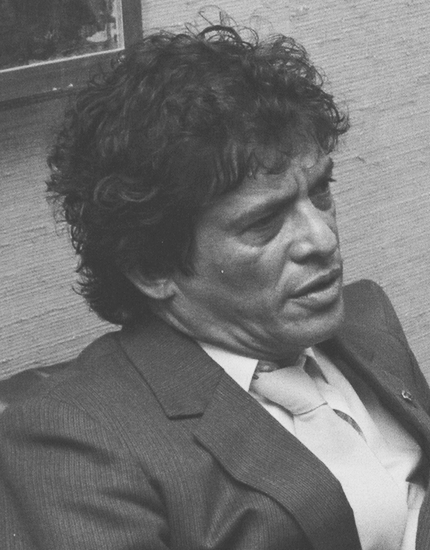
	First party	Second party
Leader	Navin Ramgoolam	Gaëtan Duval
Party	Labour	PGD
Alliance	PTr–MMM	–
Seats won	35	1
Seat change	▲29	New
Popular vote	652,167	105,282
Percentage	39.20%	6.33%
Alliance seats	60
Popular vote	1,084,236
Alliance %	65.17%
- Alliance result by constituency. The colour shade shows the percentage of the elected candidate with the highest number of votes
Prime Minister before election
Sir Anerood Jugnauth
MSM
Subsequent Prime Minister
Navin Ramgoolam
Labour

General elections were held in Mauritius on 20 December 1995. The result was a landslide victory for the Labour Party-Mauritian Militant Movement alliance led by Navin Ramgoolam, which won all 60 constituency seats on Mauritius. Along with 1982, it was one of three elections in which a party won every seat. The Militant Socialist Movement (MSM) led by Anerood Jugnauth lost power after 13 years, with Jugnauth resigning two days after the results were announced. Navin Ramgoolam became Prime Minister and appointed Paul Berenger as Deputy Prime Minister.

== Electoral system ==
The voting system involved twenty constituencies on Mauritius, which each elected three members. Two seats were elected by residents of Rodrigues, and up to eight seats could be filled by the "best losers", although only four were filled at this election. Voter turnout was 79.9%.

== Results ==
Of the 60 seats won by the Labour–MMM alliance, the Labour Party won 35 and the MMM 25.

Party or alliance		Votes	%	Seats			
Party or alliance		Votes	%	Cons	BL	Total	+/–
PTr–MMM	Labour Party	652,167	39.20	35	0	35	+29
PTr–MMM	Mauritian Militant Movement	432,069	25.97	25	0	25	0
PTr–MMM	Total	1,084,236	65.17	60	0	60	New
MSM–RMM	Militant Socialist Movement	330,219	19.85	0	0	0	–30
MSM–RMM	Mauritian Militant Renewal	330,219	19.85	0	0	0	New
MSM–RMM	Democratic Labour Movement	330,219	19.85	0	0	0	–2
MSM–RMM	Total	330,219	19.85	0	0	0	New
Parti Gaëtan Duval		105,282	6.33	0	1	1	New
MMP–HP	MMP–Hizbullah	28,749	1.73	0	1	1	New
MMP–HP	Mouvement Mauricien Pour La Paix	1,630	0.10	0	0	0	New
MMP–HP	Hizbullah	1,375	0.08	0	0	0	0
MMP–HP	Total	31,754	1.91	0	1	1	New
Mauritian Militant Socialist Movement		25,472	1.53	0	0	0	New
Rodrigues People's Organisation		16,631	1.00	2	0	2	0
Rodrigues Movement		9,529	0.57	0	2	2	New
Front Populaire Musulman		8,233	0.49	0	0	0	New
Mouvement des Democrates Liberaux		6,848	0.41	0	0	0	New
Parti de la loi Naturelle		4,074	0.24	0	0	0	New
Parti Action Liberal		3,332	0.20	0	0	0	0
Parti du Peuple Mauricien		2,505	0.15	0	0	0	0
Mouvement pour la Justice		1,149	0.07	0	0	0	New
Mouvement Democratique Mauricien		859	0.05	0	0	0	New
Mouvement Socialiste du Sud		342	0.02	0	0	0	0
Hindu Etka Andolan Dul		307	0.02	0	0	0	New
Republican Movement		281	0.02	0	0	0	–
Démocratie Mauricienne		259	0.02	0	0	0	New
Mouvement Travailleurs Mauricien		212	0.01	0	0	0	New
Mauritius United Party		185	0.01	0	0	0	0
Mauritius Party Rights		100	0.01	0	0	0	0
Independents		32,007	1.92	0	0	0	0
Total		1,663,816	100.00	62	4	66	0
Valid votes		559,005	98.44				
Invalid/blank votes		8,832	1.56				
Total votes		567,837	100.00				
Registered voters/turnout		715,179	79.40				
Source: OEC, OEC, African Elections Database, EISA, Nohlen et al.

=== By constituency ===
Constituency		MP	Party	Notes
1	Grand River North West– Port Louis West	James Burty David	PTr	Elected
1	Grand River North West– Port Louis West	Jean Claude Barbier	MMM	Elected
1	Grand River North West– Port Louis West	Arianne Navarre-Marie	MMM	Elected
2	Port Louis South– Port Louis Central	Rashid Beebeejaun	PTr	Elected
2	Port Louis South– Port Louis Central	Joseph Tsang Mang Kin	PTr	Elected
2	Port Louis South– Port Louis Central	Ahmad Jeewah	MMM	Reelected
3	Port Louis Maritime– Port Louis East	Samioullah Lauthan	MMM	Elected
3	Port Louis Maritime– Port Louis East	Iqbal Mallam-Hassam	PTr	Elected
3	Port Louis Maritime– Port Louis East	Mohammad Nanhuck	MMM	Elected
3	Port Louis Maritime– Port Louis East	Mustapha Beeharry	MMP	Best Loser
4	Port Louis North– Montagne Longue	Indira Thacoor	PTr	Elected
4	Port Louis North– Montagne Longue	Jean-François Chaumière	PTr	Elected
4	Port Louis North– Montagne Longue	José Arunasalom	MMM	Reelected
5	Pamplemousses–Triolet	Navin Ramgoolam	PTr	Reelected
5	Pamplemousses–Triolet	Dev Ramnah	MMM	Elected
5	Pamplemousses–Triolet	Navin Soonarane	PTr	Elected
6	Grand Baie–Poudre D'Or	Dhaneshwar Beeharry	PTr	Elected
6	Grand Baie–Poudre D'Or	Pradeep Jeeha	MMM	Elected
6	Grand Baie–Poudre D'Or	Siven Poonoosamy	PTr	Elected
7	Piton–Riviere du Rempart	Jai Prakash Meenowa	MMM	Elected
7	Piton–Riviere du Rempart	Dev Virahsawmy	PTr	Elected
7	Piton–Riviere du Rempart	Rajman Rampersad	PTr	Elected
8	Quartier Militaire–Moka	Lormus Bundhoo	PTr	Elected
8	Quartier Militaire–Moka	Suren Dayal	PTr	Elected
8	Quartier Militaire–Moka	Veda Baloomoody	MMM	Elected
9	Flacq–Bon Accueil	Vinod Bojeenauth	PTr	Elected
9	Flacq–Bon Accueil	Ajay Gunness	MMM	Elected
9	Flacq–Bon Accueil	Dhurma Nath	MMM	Elected
10	Montagne Blanche– Grand River South East	Manou Bheenick	PTr	Elected
10	Montagne Blanche– Grand River South East	Vishnu Bundhun	PTr	Elected
10	Montagne Blanche– Grand River South East	Zeel Peerun	MMM	Reelected
11	Vieux Grand Port–Rose Belle	Arvin Boolell	PTr	Reelected
11	Vieux Grand Port–Rose Belle	Jagdish Haton	MMM	Elected
11	Vieux Grand Port–Rose Belle	Yesdev Jeelall	PTr	Elected
12	Mahebourg–Plaine Magnien	Vasant Bunwaree	PTr	Reelected
12	Mahebourg–Plaine Magnien	Eddy Boissézon	MMM	Elected
12	Mahebourg–Plaine Magnien	Anand Soburrun	PTr	Elected
13	Riviere des Anguilles–Souillac	Kishore Deerpalsing	PTr	Elected
13	Riviere des Anguilles–Souillac	Moorthy Sunassee	PTr	Elected
13	Riviere des Anguilles–Souillac	Raouf Bundhun	MMM	Elected
14	Savanne–Black River	Alan Ganoo	MMM	Elected
14	Savanne–Black River	Hervé Aimée	PTr	Elected
14	Savanne–Black River	Seewoosunkur Jhuboo	PTr	Elected
15	La Caverne–Phoenix	Razack Peeroo	PTr	Reelected
15	La Caverne–Phoenix	Steven Obeegadoo	MMM	Reelected
15	La Caverne–Phoenix	Kailash Purryag	PTr	Elected
16	Vacoas–Floreal	Sarat Lallah	PTr	Elected
16	Vacoas–Floreal	Siram Sakaram	MMM	Elected
16	Vacoas–Floreal	Marie-Claude Arouff-Parfait	PTr	Elected
17	Curepipe–Midlands	Clarel Malherbe	PTr	Reelected
17	Curepipe–Midlands	Jacques Chasteau de Balyon	PTr	Elected
17	Curepipe–Midlands	Motee Ramdass	MMM	Elected
17	Curepipe–Midlands	Gaëtan Duval	PGD	Best Loser; Reelected
18	Belle Rose–Quatre Bornes	Dan Bhima	PTr	Elected
18	Belle Rose–Quatre Bornes	Kadress Pillay	PTr	Elected
18	Belle Rose–Quatre Bornes	Danielle Perrier	MMM	Elected
19	Stanley–Rose Hill	Paul Bérenger	MMM	Reelected
19	Stanley–Rose Hill	Siddick Chady	PTr	Reelected
19	Stanley–Rose Hill	Jayen Cuttaree	MMM	Reelected
20	Beau Bassin–Petite Riviere	Joceline Minèrve	MMM	Reelected
20	Beau Bassin–Petite Riviere	Rajesh Bhagwan	MMM	Reelected
20	Beau Bassin–Petite Riviere	Monique Ohsan-Bellepeau	PTr	Elected
21	Rodrigues	Benoît Jolicoeur	OPR	Reelected
21	Rodrigues	Serge Clair	OPR	Reelected
21	Rodrigues	Nicolas Von Mally	MR	Best Loser
21	Rodrigues	Alex Nancy	MR	Best Loser
Source: OEC, OEC
