= Prime Minister of Mauritius =

Head of government

- Premier ministre de Maurice (French)
- Coat of arms of Mauritius

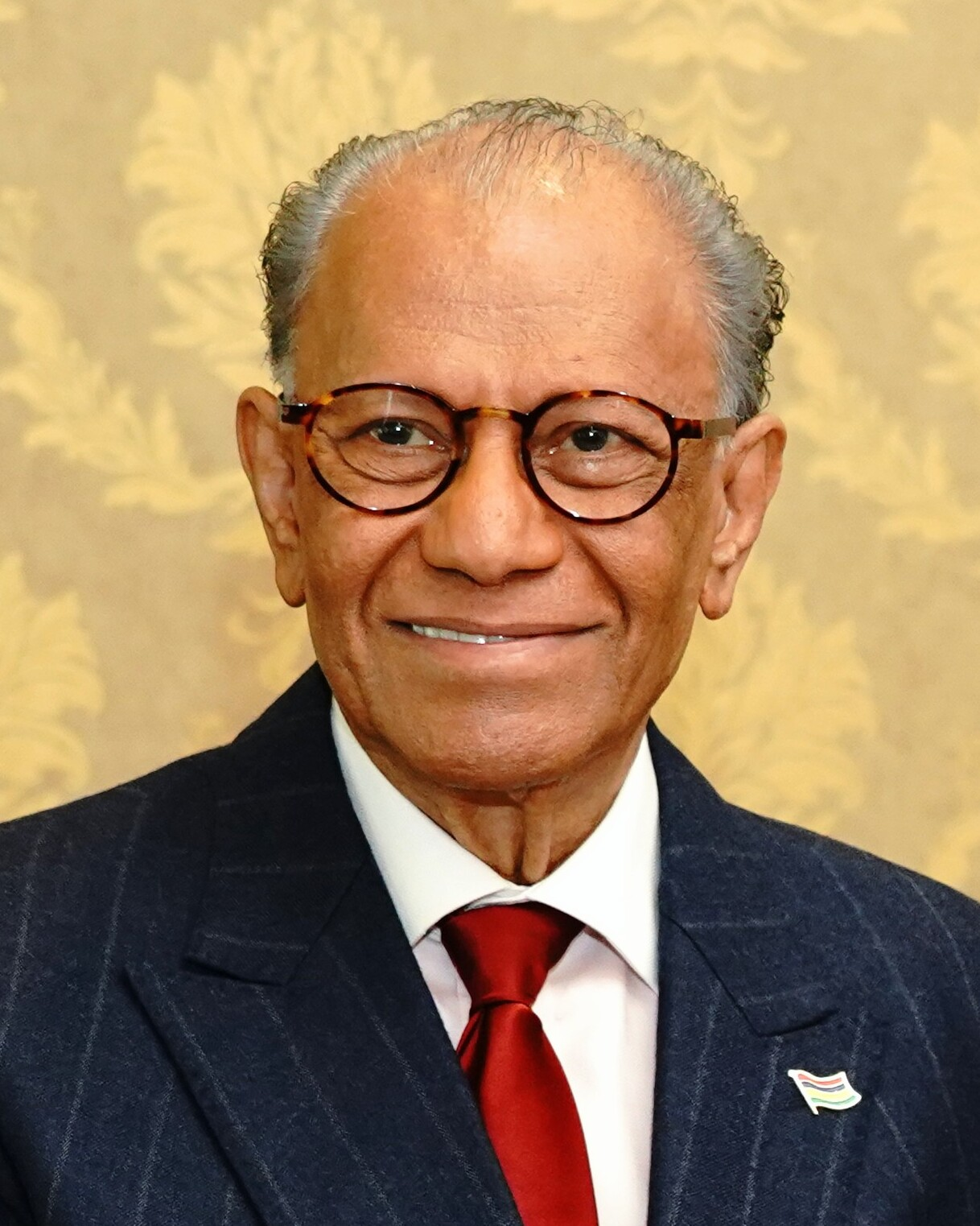
- Incumbent; Navin Ramgoolam since 12 November 2024
- Style: The Honourable
- Seat: New Treasury Building, Intendance Street, Port Louis
- Appointer: President of Mauritius
- Term length: At the president's pleasure (as long as the holder commands a majority in the National Assembly)
- Formation: 18 December 1967; 58 years ago
- First holder: Sir Seewoosagur Ramgoolam
- Deputy: Deputy Prime Minister
- Salary: 500,000 Mauritian rupee
- Website: Prime Minister's Office

The prime minister of Mauritius (French: Premier Ministre de Maurice) is the head of government of Mauritius. He presides over the Cabinet of Ministers, which advises the president of the country and is collectively responsible to the National Assembly for any advice given and for all action done by or under the authority of any minister in the execution of his office.

The position is the most powerful constitutional office in the country. This is mainly because the office is amalgamated with other functions whereby conventions, the office holder is also the minister of defense and home affairs (which makes the office holder responsible for law and order, internal security, defense, the armed forces and intelligence services), the leader of the National Assembly (which makes the office holder responsible for setting the agenda for parliament) and minister for Rodrigues and dependencies (which makes the office holder responsible for occupancy, administration of local dependencies and their defense). It is also inter-alia the head of government and presides over the cabinet of ministers. It is second in the order of precedence just after the president and enjoys relative importance in the public as the officeholder is usually the leader of the party/alliance that wins an election.

The current prime minister of Mauritius is Navin Ramgoolam, leader of the Labour Party; he was appointed by president Prithvirajsing Roopun on 12 November 2024, following the resignation of prime minister Pravind Jugnauth. The official residence of the prime minister during his term in office is the Clarisse House, the Prime Minister's Office is located in Port Louis. The longest serving prime minister is Anerood Jugnauth, who held the office of prime minister for about 19 years; if Navin Ramgoolam stays in office for a complete term, he will overtake Anerood Jugnauth.

== Overview ==
The current prime minister's portfolio includes inter-alia, the following:

- Law and Order
- Civil Status, Citizenship
- Electoral Commissions and Electoral Affairs
- Government Information Services
- Meteorological Services
- Civil Aviation
- Mauritius Oceanography Institute
- Human Rights
- Strategic Policy
- Outer Islands of Mauritius
- Ministry of Defence
- Home Affairs
- External Communications
- Rodrigues
- Territorial Integrity

The prime minister is appointed by the president. The prime minister holds the second most senior position in the country, second only to the president. The prime minister is usually the leader of the largest party in the ruling coalition. The position of prime minister along with the office of deputy prime minister is specified under Chapter VI, Section 59, Part 1 of the Constitution of Mauritius.

After the country became a republic on 12 March 1992, the president became the head of state. The president holds prerogative powers which includes summoning, prorogation and dissolution of parliament including appointment of the prime minister and Cabinet. The prime minister has the constitutional duty to advise him/her when to exercise these prerogatives.

== History ==
=== Pre-Independence ===
During the British Mauritius period, it was the chief minister who was the head of government, executive powers was vested by the governor, representative of the monarch. The only chief minister that the country had known was Sir Seewoosagur Ramgoolam, from 26 September 1961 to 12 March 1968.

=== Independence ===
The office of Prime Minister of Mauritius was created on 12 March 1968 when Mauritius became an independent state. Queen Elizabeth II remained as head of state as Queen of Mauritius, with her executive powers in Mauritius delegated to the governor-general.

After the 1967 general election, Sir Seewoosagur Ramgoolam (SSR) became the first prime minister of Mauritius, he was re-elected in the 1976 general election and remained in office. In the 1982 general election, Sir Anerood Jugnauth (SAJ) coalition was elected, and he became prime minister. However, his alliance broke up in 1983 and the 1983 general election was held, SAJ formed another alliance, and he was elected again and remained in office. In the 1987 general election, another coalition concluded by SAJ won again, and he remained in office. SAJ also won the 1991 general election and remained the prime minister of Mauritius. The new leader of the Labour Party, Navin Ramgoolam, became the leader of the opposition.

=== Republic ===
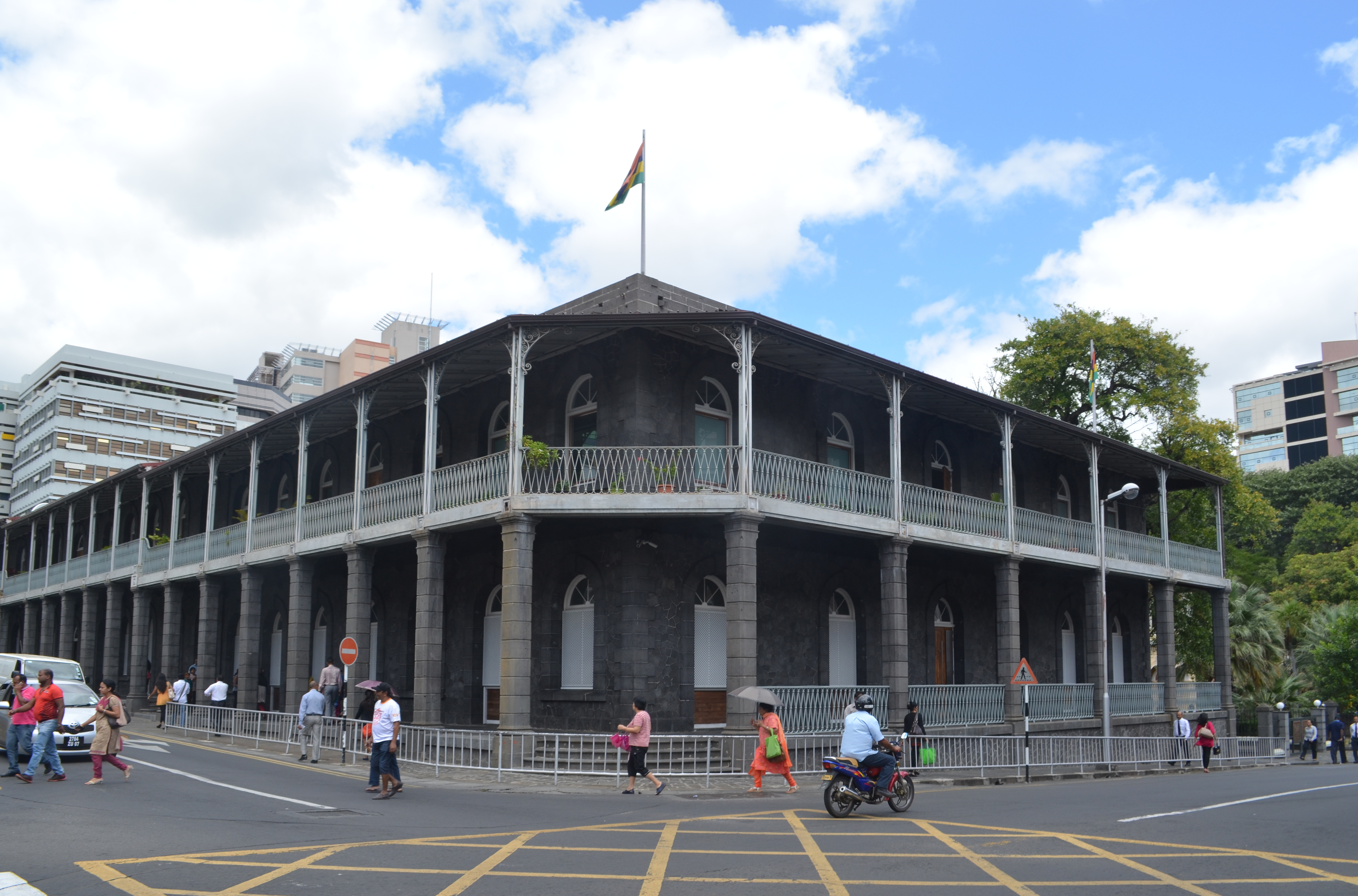
The prime minister's office is located in Port Louis.

After the country became a republic on 12 March 1992, the president became the head of state. The president holds prerogative powers which includes summoning, prorogation and dissolution of parliament including appointment of the prime minister and Cabinet. The prime minister has the constitutional duty to advise him/her when to exercise these prerogatives.

On 12 March 1992, Mauritius became a republic, with a new constitution in 1992, the terms of the general elections were regulated to five years. Since then, every five years, elections have taken place and a new prime minister is elected. After the 1995 general election, Dr Navin Ramgoolam became Prime Minister of Mauritius for the first time. However, he lost the 2000 general election. In 2000, the prime minister's office was shared between two leaders: Sir Anerood Jugnauth spent three years as prime minister and Paul Bérenger spent two years. After the 2005 general election, Dr. Navin Ramgoolam became the prime minister again. In the 2010 general election, he was re-elected and remained in office. The 2014 general election returned Anerood Jugnauth to the prime minister's office. Pravind Jugnauth was appointed as prime minister by President Ameenah Gurib-Fakim on 23 January 2017, following the resignation of his father and coalition leader Anerood Jugnauth. Pravind won the 2019 general election, which kept the MSM in power.

== Oaths ==
According to the third schedule of the Constitution of Mauritius, an oath under this section shall be administered by the Prime Minister.

I, [name], being appointed Prime Minister, do swear (or solemnly affirm) that I will to the best of my judgment, at all times when so required, freely give my counsel and advice to the President (or any other person for the time being lawfully performing the functions of that office) for the good management of the public affairs of Mauritius, and I do further swear (or solemnly affirm) that I will not on any account, at any time whatsoever, disclose the counsel, advice, opinion or vote of any particular Minister, Senior Minister or Junior Minister and that I will not, except with the authority of the Cabinet and to such extent as may be required for the good management of the affairs of Mauritius, directly or indirectly reveal the business or proceedings of the Prime Minister or any matter coming to my knowledge in my capacity as such and that in all things I will be a true and faithful Prime Minister. (So help me God.)

== See also ==
- Spouse of the prime minister of Mauritius
- List of prime ministers of Mauritius
- President of Mauritius
- Deputy Prime Minister of Mauritius
- Vice Prime Minister of Mauritius
- Leader of the Opposition (Mauritius)
- Government of Mauritius
