= Vice-Prime Minister of Mauritius =

- Vice-Premier Ministre de Maurice
- Coat of arms of Mauritius
- Incumbent; Vacant since 22 November 2024
- Style: The Honourable
- Nominator: Prime Minister of Mauritius
- Appointer: President of Mauritius
- Term length: 5 years or earlier, renewable
- Inaugural holder: Xavier-Luc Duval; Rama Sithanen
- Formation: 20 September 2008; 17 years ago

Vice-Prime Minister of Mauritius (French: Vice-Premier ministre) is an honorary title usually carried by up to two incumbent ministers of the Government of Mauritius, that does not exist separately under the Constitution of Mauritius.

The office is currently vacant, with incumbent Prime Minister Navin Ramgoolam declining to appoint any. Leela Dookun-Luchoomun and Anwar Husnoo were the previous holders of the office and both held it since being appointed on 12 November 2019.

== Constitutional position ==
Under the constitution, the only positions in the cabinet that are explicitly mentioned are the offices of Prime Minister, Deputy Prime Minister, Attorney-General and other ministers, not exceeding the total of 24 members as required in the constitution. Article 59(2) also states that any other ministerial offices may be prescribed by the National Assembly or by the President, acting in accordance of the law and the advice of the prime minister.

The creation of the position of Vice-Prime Minister under the Offices of Minister Act (2008) provided two positions under that title. The only requirement as explicitly stated under the act for the holder to have is to be a member of the National Assembly. No other powers are vested upon the position and is thus merely honorific, allowing the elevation of important members of the government and giving them a higher precedence or recognition in the cabinet.

Therefore, in case of absence, illness or sudden death of the prime minister, it is only the Deputy Prime Minister who takes on the role and responsibilities of acting prime minister until the prime minister resumes office or another is appointed.

== History ==
Following the 2005 general election, prime minister Navin Ramgoolam appointed three ministers to the post of Deputy Prime Minister: Labour's Rashid Beebeejaun and Rama Sithanen and Parti Mauricien Social Démocrate's Xavier-Luc Duval. Ramgoolam had clarified that Beebeejaun would become the constitutional Deputy Prime Minister whilst Sithanen and Duval were to be both honorary Deputy Prime Ministers. All three ministers were sworn in to the office when the cabinet was formed. In the previous years, under Anerood Jugnauth's governments, the practice of having a constitutional and honorary Deputy Prime Ministers were common.

However, following a legal challenge to the appointments to the office, the Supreme Court of Mauritius ruled on 21 August 2008 that the constitution only provides for the appointment of a singular deputy prime minister. In response, the government proposed a bill at the National Assembly to create offices for two Vice-Prime Ministers on 15 September. The bill was passed and subsequently adopted on 19 September. Sithanen and Duval were eventually sworn in once again on 20 September under the virtue of the newly established office.

Since its creation, the office has been continuously used until 2024, when Ramgoolam himself declined to appoint any person to the office, citing that the constitution explicitly only mentions one prime minister and one deputy prime minister.

== List of vice-prime ministers ==
Portrait	Name (Birth–Death)	Election	Tenure		Concurrent portfolio(s)	Party	Ref.
Portrait	Name (Birth–Death)	Election	Took office	Left office	Concurrent portfolio(s)	Party	Ref.
	Xavier-Luc Duval (born 1958)	2005	20 September 2008	5 May 2010	Tourism, Leisure and External Communications	PMSD	
	Xavier-Luc Duval (born 1958)	2010	5 May 2010	6 June 2014	Social Integration and Economic Empowerment (2010–11); Finance and Economic Development (2011–14)	PMSD	
	Rama Sithanen (born 1954)	2005	20 September 2008	5 May 2010	Finance and Economic Empowerment	PTr	
	Pravind Jugnauth (born 1961)	2010	11 May 2010	26 July 2011	Finance and Economic Development	MSM	
	Anil Bachoo (born 1953)	2010	7 August 2011	13 December 2014	Public Infrastructure, National Development Unit, Land Transport and Shipping	PTr	
	Ivan Collendavelloo (born 1950)	2014	15 December 2014	20 December 2016	Energy and Public Utilities	ML	
	Showkutally Soodhun (born 1951)	2014	15 December 2014	16 November 2017	Housing and Lands	MSM	
	Fazila Jeewa-Daureeawoo (born 1959)	2014	16 November 2017	12 November 2019	Local Government and Outer Islands; Gender Equality, Child Development and Family Welfare (2018–19)	MSM	
	Leela Dookun-Luchoomun (born 1961)	2019	12 November 2019	12 November 2024	Education, Tertiary Education, Science and Technology	MSM	
	Anwar Husnoo (born 1951)	2019	12 November 2019	12 November 2024	Local Government, Disaster and Risk Management	MSM	

== See also ==
- President of Mauritius
- Prime Minister of Mauritius
- Deputy Prime Minister of Mauritius
- Leader of the Opposition (Mauritius)
- Government of Mauritius
