= Abu Kasenally =

Mauritian physician and politician (1941–2026)

Dr. Abu Twalib Kasenally ابو طالب کسنیلی
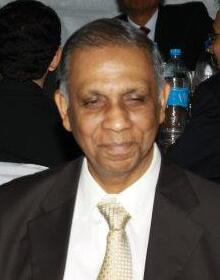

Minister of Housing & lands
- In office 13 September 2008 – 20 November 2014
- President: Sir Anerood Jugnauth
- Prime Minister: Navin Ramgoolam
- Succeeded by: Showkatally Soodhun

Minister of Public Utilities
- In office 12 July 2005 – 13 September 2008
- President: Sir Anerood Jugnauth
- Prime Minister: Navin Ramgoolam
- Succeeded by: Rashid Beebeejaun

2nd Member of Parliament for No.13 RDA-Souillac
- In office 11 May 2010 – 10 November 2014
- President: Sir Anerood Jugnauth
- Prime Minister: Paul Berenger
- Preceded by: Ram Mardemootoo

1st Member of Parliament for No.15 LC-Phoenix
- In office 5 July 2005 – 11 May 2010
- President: Sir Anerood Jugnauth
- Prime Minister: Navin Ramgoolam
- Preceded by: Leela Devi Dookun
- Succeeded by: Patrick Assirvaden

Personal details
- Born: 10 August 1941 Rivière du Rempart, British Mauritius
- Died: 27 April 2026 (aged 84)
- Party: Mauritian Labour Party
- Occupation: Physician

Abu Twalib Kasenally (Urdu: ابو طالب کسنیلی; 10 August 1941 – 27 April 2026) was a Mauritian physician and politician.

== Life and career ==
Kasenally practised surgery from 1974 and became Regional Health Director and Principal Medical Officer (PMO) at the Ministry of Health. In 2000 he resigned from the Civil Service to enter politics. At the 11 September 2000 National Assembly Elections he was candidate of Labour-PMXD coalition in Constituency No.3 Port Louis Maritime and Port Louis East but failed to be elected with only 5744 votes.

At the 3 July 2005 elections, he was elected in Constituency No.15 (La Caverne-Phoenix) after campaigning for Alliance Social (PTR-PMXD-VF-MR-MMSM). He was appointed Minister of Public Utilities in 2005 before being appointed Minister of Housing in 2008.

At the 5 May 2010 elections, Kasenally was elected in Constituency No.13 (Rivière des Anguilles-Souillac) as candidate for the PTR-PMSD-MSM coalition. He was Minister of Housing & Lands until the December 2014 elections. He did not participate in the 2014 elections and 2019 elections.

Kasenally died on 27 April 2026, at the age of 84.
