= Illovo Deal =

Illovo Deal refers to the 2001 sale of large areas of agricultural land in Mauritius, with involvement of the State. In the local Mauritian press it s sometimes also known as the Ilovo Deal or Deal Ilovo.

== History ==
The origins of the Illovo Deal date back to 1998 when multi-national corporation Lonrho sold its sugar estates and its 3 sugar factories in Mauritius to Illovo, the South African sugar conglomerate. A few years later in 2001 the Illovo group sold off these assets through the Illovo deal to private companies and para-statal bodies.

== 2001 Illovo Deal ==
The Illovo Deal was conceived and implemented soon after the MMM-MSM coalition (headed by Anerood Jugnauth and Paul Bérenger) came to power in September 2000. Then Finance Minister Pravind Jugnauth explained that the Illovo Deal would provide enough finance for the construction of the Cyber City in Ebène, renovation of the old Plaisance Airport and of the ageing University of Mauritius, as well as construction of the new Bagatelle Dam and a new stadium. Pravind Jugnauth also explained that by 2004 the Illovo Deal had enabled 43 000 small planters and employees of the ailing sugar industry to buy 7,000 arpents at Rs 125 000 per arpent via the Sugar Investment Trust (SIT). These small planters also own 24.5% of Mon-Trésor-Mon-Désert (MTMD). Furthermore, the SIT and the National Pension Fund (NPF) benefit as shareholders of MTMD.

== Criticism ==
Various criticism has been raised about the true beneficiaries of the 2001 Illovo Deal. Some believe that the small planters and tax payers have not received a fair share of the windfall resulting from the sale of the agricultural land, especially after the original deal was modified at the last minute by members of the ruling MSM-MMM government.
