= Renganaden Padayachy =

Mauritian politician

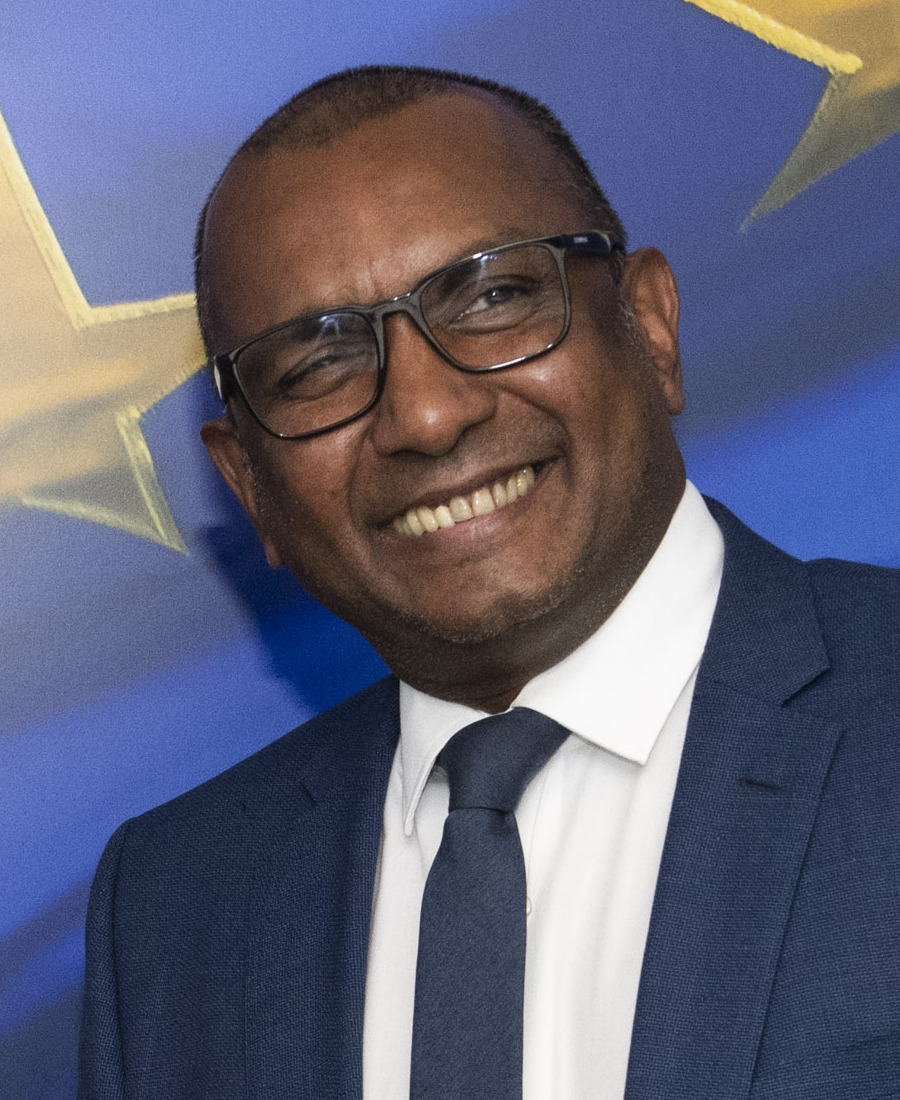

Minister of Finance, Economic Planning and Development
- In office 12 November 2019 – 12 November 2024
- Prime Minister: Pravind Jugnauth
- Preceded by: Pravind Jugnauth (Finance and Economic Development)
- Succeeded by: Navin Ramgoolam (Finance)

Personal details
- Born: 7 February 1971 (age 55) Bel Air Rivière Sèche
- Party: Militant Socialist Movement
- Education: Paris 1 Panthéon-Sorbonne University

Renganaden Padayachy (born 7 February 1971) is a Mauritian politician.

== Early life, education & career ==
Padayachy grew up in Bel Air and completed his secondary education at John Kennedy College. He studied in France and holds a master's degree in Public Economics (University of Paris I Panthéon-Sorbonne), a master's degree in Industrial Economics (University of Franche-Comté) as well as a Ph.D. in economics from the University of Paris I Panthéon-Sorbonne.

He worked as chief economist at the Mauritius Chamber of Commerce and Industry (MCCI) before he was appointed in January 2018 as first deputy governor of the Bank of Mauritius (BoM) and chairman of the Financial Services Commission (FSC).

== Political career ==
At the 2019 Mauritian general election Renganaden Padayachy stood as candidate of the MSM within the L'Alliance Morisien. He was elected as Second Member for Constituency No.13 Rivière des Anguilles-Souillac in the National Assembly. On 12 November 2019 he was appointed Minister of Finance, Economic Planning and Development. On 7 January 2025, Mauritian authorities issued an arrest warrant against Renganaden Padayachy, for alleged embezzlement involving the payment of Rs. 45 million (US$1 million) from the Mauritius Investment Corporation to a company. He was later arrested on 9 April 2025 for the embezzlement case but was released on bail a few days later.
