= Ministry of Finance (Mauritius) =

Government ministry of Mauritius

- Ministère des Finances

Agency overview
- Formed: 1968
- Jurisdiction: Government of Mauritius
- Headquarters: Port Louis, Mauritius
- Ministers responsible: Dr. Navinchandra Ramgoolam, Prime Minister and Minister of Finance; Dhaneshwar Damry, Junior Minister
- Agency executive: Mr Anandsing Acharuz - Financial Secretary
- Website: http://mof.govmu.org

The Ministry of Finance of Mauritius is a ministerial department found in the Cabinet of the Government of the Republic. It is considered as the most executive and important ministry in the cabinet after the Prime Minister's Office. The minister of finance is the most desirable position in the cabinet of the country except of the prime minister. Most of the time being the Deputy Prime Minister or any other senior member of the cabinet. It was created along with the cabinet on 7 July 1968, and since then it has been in the cabinet.

There are other departments falling under the aegis of the office such as economic development or empowerment. The department is not to be confused with the minister of economic planning as the minister of finance is the sole person in charge of the yearly budget for governmental and parliamentary works. The incumbent minister is Navin Ramgoolam who is also the Prime Minister, took office as from 22 November 2024.

The Accounting Officer of the Ministry of Finance is the Financial Secretary.

== Cabinet importance ==
The ministry of finance in the country is a very important department. It controls all the economic activities of the country as well as determines major price index of all the staples and all other commodities subsidies and taxes. It also determines the price of petrol and gas.

The Central Bank of Mauritius falls under the department and is accountable to the minister. Often considered as the post of the most eligible future prime minister, the minister of finance plays a rather important role in a government as it may decide if the economics policies brought forward by the political party in power are good or rather futile. This may result in a change in people's vote which may oust a government to a new party for a better economic management.

== History ==
Many Finance ministers have shaped the economy and brought about significant economic changes and benefits to the country working under the lead and guidance of their prime ministers. Vishnu Lutchmeenaraidoo was one of these Finance ministers from 1983 to 1991 in the cabinet of Anerood Jugnauth where he introduced ideas and policies developed by Jugnauth.

In some other cases like in 2000 to 2003, then finance minister Paul Bérenger who was also deputy prime minister, brought some of his own economic ideas and development which resulted in a constructive economic sector known as the BPO. Berenger became prime minister in 2003 and appointed Pravind Jugnauth as the head of finance and his deputy. Pravind Jugnauth also held the office with his own ideas and initiatives without the need to constantly seek the lead of Bérenger. This led to conflict between them and the eventual dissolution of their coalition after they lost the 2005 general election to Navin Ramgoolam.

In 2005 when Navin Ramgoolam came to power, he formed a new cabinet and appointed Rama Sithanen as namesake minister. Sithanen introduced a series of economic policies and implementations such as free public transport to students and senior citizen and also the removal of Subsidies on O level and A level examinations in High School.

In 2010, after retaining power for the second successive mandate Navin Ramgoolam formed a new government in alliance with the Militant Socialist Movement. The leader of the MSM, Pravind Jugnauth was re-appointed as Vice Prime Minister and Minister of Finance. He also implemented his own policies and economic changes as per his party's program within the coalition. This led to tension, compounded by the Medpoint scandal that led to the split of their alliance.

In December 2014, Ramgoolam lost the general election. Anerood Jugnauth, who defeated him, formed a coalition government and brought back Vishnu Lutchmeenaraidoo in the hope of creating a Second Economic Miracle.

== Salary ==
The salary of the minister of finance is the same as a cabinet member unless, the office holder is also appointed as deputy prime minister or vice prime minister. The salary is as follows

Office	Salary Yearly
Deputy Prime Minister; Minister of Finance	Rs 1,800,000; US $60,000
Vice Prime Minister; Minister of Finance	Rs 1,740,000; US $58, 000
Cabinet Minister	Rs 1,740,000; US $58, 000

== List of finance ministers ==
Portrait	Name	Term of office			Portfolio name	Party	Prime minister	Ref.
Portrait	Name	Took office	Left office	Time in office	Portfolio name	Party	Prime minister	Ref.
	Sir Seewoosagur Ramgoolam	26 September 1961	15 August 1967	5 years, 323 days	Finance	PTr	S. Ramgoolam	
	Guy Forget	15 August 1967	12 March 1968	210 days	Finance	PTr	S. Ramgoolam	
	Sir Veerasamy Ringadoo	12 March 1968	15 June 1982	14 years, 95 days	Finance	PTr	S. Ramgoolam	
	Paul Bérenger	15 June 1982	22 March 1983	280 days	Finance	MMM	A. Jugnauth	
	Anerood Jugnauth	28 March 1983	30 March 1983	2 days	Finance	MMM	A. Jugnauth	
	Anerood Jugnauth	28 March 1983	30 March 1983	2 days	Finance	MSM	A. Jugnauth	
	Vishnu Lutchmeenaraidoo	30 March 1983	18 August 1990	7 years, 141 days	Finance	MSM	A. Jugnauth	
	Sir Anerood Jugnauth	18 August 1990	15 September 1991	1 year, 28 days	Finance	MSM	A. Jugnauth	
	Rama Sithanen	15 September 1991	27 December 1995	4 years, 103 days	Finance	MSM	A. Jugnauth	
	Rundheersing Bheenick	30 December 1995	6 August 1996	220 days	Finance	PTr	N. Ramgoolam	
	Vasant Bunwaree	27 November 1996	17 September 2000	3 years, 295 days	Finance	PTr	N. Ramgoolam	
	Paul Bérenger	17 September 2000	30 September 2003	3 years, 13 days	Finance	MMM	A. Jugnauth	
	Pravind Jugnauth	30 September 2003	23 December 2003	1 year, 278 days	Finance	MSM	Bérenger	
	Pravind Jugnauth	23 December 2003	5 July 2005	1 year, 278 days	Finance and Economic Development	MSM	Bérenger	
	Rama Sithanen	7 July 2005	13 September 2008	4 years, 308 days	Finance and Economic Development	PTr	N. Ramgoolam	
	Rama Sithanen	13 September 2008	11 May 2010	4 years, 308 days	Finance and Economic Empowerment	PTr	N. Ramgoolam	
	Pravind Jugnauth	11 May 2010	26 July 2011	1 year, 76 days	Finance and Economic Development	MSM	N. Ramgoolam	
	Vasant Bunwaree; Acting	26 July 2011	7 August 2011	12 days	Finance and Economic Development	PTr	N. Ramgoolam	
	Xavier-Luc Duval	7 August 2011	6 June 2014	2 years, 315 days	Finance and Economic Development	PMSD	N. Ramgoolam	
	Navin Ramgoolam	6 June 2014	13 December 2014	190 days	Finance and Economic Development	PTr	N. Ramgoolam	
	Vishnu Lutchmeenaraidoo	15 December 2014	14 March 2016	1 year, 90 days	Finance and Economic Development	MSM	A. Jugnauth	
	Sir Anerood Jugnauth	14 March 2016	24 May 2016	71 days	Finance and Economic Development	MSM	A. Jugnauth	
	Pravind Jugnauth	25 May 2016	12 November 2019	3 years, 171 days	Finance and Economic Development	MSM	A. Jugnauth	
	Pravind Jugnauth	25 May 2016	12 November 2019	3 years, 171 days	Finance and Economic Development	MSM	P. Jugnauth	
	Renganaden Padayachy	12 November 2019	12 November 2024	5 years	Finance, Economic Planning and Development	MSM	P. Jugnauth	
	Navin Ramgoolam	22 November 2024	Incumbent	1 year, 259 days	Finance	PTr	N. Ramgoolam	

== See also ==
- List of company registers
