= Sanedhip Bhimjee =

- Born: 17 March 1970; Tulear, Madagascar
- Died: 24 June 2014 (aged 44); Mauritius
- Occupations: Kathak Dancer, Choreographer

Sanedhip Bhimjee was a famous Kathak Dancer and Choreographer in Mauritius. He was born on 17 March 1970 in Madagascar and he started his career with modeling. He started learning Kathak since the age of 18 in Indira Gandhi Institute. He first appeared in the stage with Pramila Virahsawmy at Plaza Theatre in Rose Hill for the occasion of Gujarati festival in Mauritius. When Sanedhip saw Anna Patten dancing for the first time he was mesmerized and knew that a new dimension of kathak would flourish from both talents known as Mauritian Kathak. Sanedhip was a very famous Kathak Dancer and Choreographer in Mauritius. His company, Art Academy Ltd, in Mauritius was previously run by himself and his partner Anna Patten.

== Career ==
Below is a list of Shows that Sanedhip has choreographed and also participated as a Dancer:

- Shakti Yug (2005)
- Festival International Kreol (2007) (as part of the Ministry of Tourism)
- Nayika au Plaza (2003)
- Katha’zz (2010)
- Sutra of the Lotus
