= List of constitutional offices of Mauritius =

The List of Constitutional offices of Mauritius are the offices that are regulated by the constitution of the republic as being legal public offices that have been occupied since 1968. These are known as the key positions in the political jargon. As Mauritius follows the British constitutional system, some offices are not regulated by its constitution but by precedent and conventions. Examples include the position of Vice Prime Minister which was maintained from 1983 to 1990 and from 2005 up to now. Governments from 1990 to 2005 did not nominate any Vice Prime Ministers as they were not constitutionally required to do so.

Historically, other positions apart from political offices are also considered as constitutional offices. Examples are the Commissioner of Police, the Chief Justice, the Ombudsperson among others. Below this article follows a list of constitutional offices and non-constitutional offices having been provided with much administrative and governmental power. All the offices listed are positions currently constituted and that have been created through the 1968 constitutional with some others created under the constitutional amendment of 1992 following the proclamation of the Republic.

== Constitutional offices by the order of Precedence ==
=== Office of the President ===
The office of the President is the highest ranking constitutional office of the Republic. The office holder is the head of state of the country and the office provides for immediate staff of the President, as well as multiple levels of support staff reporting to the incumbent and former living presidents.

The staff includes the security to the President and former living Presidents, the administrative office for executive duties as imposed by the constitution, the Aide-de-Camp to the President, the staff for the administration of the official residence namely the Chateau of Reduit and the assistant secretary.

The office of the Vice President falls under the aegis of the office of President despite having its own entity as it provides for the support of the President in case the latter is incapable to perform duties as prescribed by the constitution.

=== Office of the Prime Minister ===
The office of the Prime Minister is the most powerful constitutional office of the Republic. The office holder is the head of government and provides the constitutional duty to advise the president when to use the executive prerogatives including opening, summoning and dissolving of the national assembly, announcement of elections whether being councils, municipals or general and providing assents to bill passed through parliament among others.

The office of the Prime Minister provides for being the most powerful and respected institution of the country. The office of currently comprises about 100 members working under the entity of the PMO (Prime Minister's office).

The office constitute the biggest office as established by the constitutions with various agencies under its aegis including the police department, civil aviation, national television, electoral commission, the cabinet and the secretary to the cabinet.
