= Vishnu Lutchmeenaraidoo =

Mauritian politician

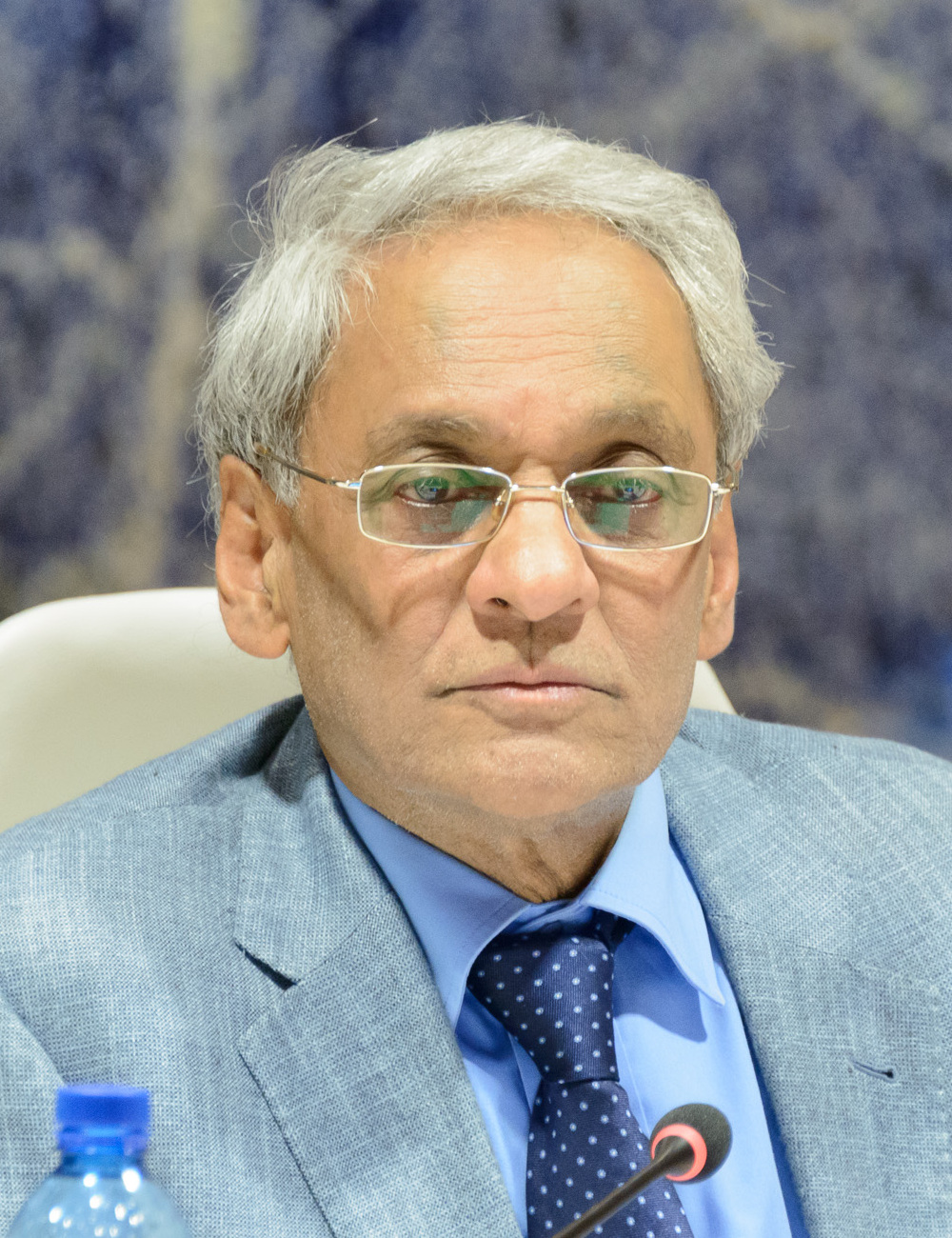

Minister of Foreign Affairs, Regional Integration and International Trade
- In office 14 March 2016 – 21 March 2019
- Prime Minister: Pravind Jugnauth
- Preceded by: Étienne Sinatambou
- Succeeded by: Nando Bodha

Minister of Finance and Economic Development Finance (1983–1990)
- In office 15 December 2014 – 14 March 2016
- Prime Minister: Anerood Jugnauth
- Preceded by: Navin Ramgoolam
- Succeeded by: Anerood Jugnauth
- In office 30 March 1983 – 18 August 1990
- Prime Minister: Anerood Jugnauth
- Preceded by: Anerood Jugnauth
- Succeeded by: Anerood Jugnauth

Member of Parliament for Piton and Rivière du Rempart
- In office 10 December 2014 – 21 March 2019
- Preceded by: Balkissoon Hookoom
- Succeeded by: Rajanah Ravi Dhaliah

Member of Parliament for Riviere des Anguilles and Souillac
- In office 11 June 1982 – 6 August 1991
- Preceded by: Suresh Chandra Poonith
- Succeeded by: Swalay Kasenally

Personal details
- Born: 24 May 1944 (age 82) Mauritius
- Party: Militant Socialist Movement
- Children: 3
- Education: Aix-Marseilles University
- Occupation: Economist

Seetanah Lutchmeenaraidoo, most commonly known as Vishnu Lutchmeenaraidoo (born 24 May 1944) is a former finance and foreign minister of Mauritius.

== Background and education ==
Vishnu Lutchmeenaraidoo completed his secondary education at New Eton College and College St-Joseph. He then studied in France, obtaining a Master in Business Administration at Aix-Marseilles University and a post graduate qualifications in Export Marketing at the Ecole Superieure de Commerce-Marseilles.

== Political career ==
Lutchmeenaraidoo was minister of finance from 1983 to 1990, with an additional title of honorary deputy prime minister granted to him in 1986. He was also a member of parliament from 2014, Minister of Finance and Economic Development from 15 December 2014 to 14 March 2016. From 14 March 2016 to 21 March 2019 he held the portfolio of Minister of Foreign Affairs, Regional Integration and International Trade before his resignation.
