= Nita Deerpalsing =

Mauritian politician

Nita Deerpalsing नीता दीरपालसिंग

Member of Parliament for Belle Rose & Quatre Bornes
- In office 5 May 2005 – 15 October 2014
- Preceded by: Sushil Kushiram
- Succeeded by: Roshi Bhadain
- Majority: 16,122 (2.623%)

Personal details
- Born: 25 January 1965 (age 61) Beau-Bassin, Mauritius
- Party: Labour Party (Mauritius)
- Occupation: Consultant

Kumaree Rajeshree Deerpalsing (born नीता दीरपालसिंग on 25 January 1965), also known as Nita Deerpalsing, is a Mauritian politician.

== Political career ==
Nita Deerpalsing was a Member of Parliament from 2005 to 2014. She was elected in Constituency No. 18 (Belle Rose & Quatre Bornes) at the 2005 and 2010 general elections. At the 2014 general elections she was not elected when she was Labour Party (Mauritius) candidate of the PTR-MMM coalition.

She was also Deputy Chairman of Committees in parliament and the Director of Communications of the Mauritius Labour Party as well as the Chairman of the Committee of the Economic Democratization of the Prime Minister's office.

Her involvement in active politics started in 2003 after her return to Mauritius after having been an Actuarial Consultant in Canada.

== Controversies ==
In 2001, her intervention against dislodging a street vendor caused a controversy

Paul Bérenger publicly insulted Nita Deerpalsing in the National Assembly in August 2008. She had expressed support for then Attorney General Rama Valayden, when Bérenger as Opposition Leader retorted with sexist comments rod enn mari pou li marie do! (meaning "go find her a husband so she can finally get married"), given that Nita Deepalsing was single. Rajesh Bhagwan, Paul Bérenger's supporter, tried to justify Bérenger's insults on the basis that he could not control his anger.

Nita Deerpalsing made news headlines soon after a public meeting of the Labour-MSM-PMSD ALLIANCE Alliance de l’Avenir held on 1 May 2010 in Quatre Bornes. The Labour Party leader Navin Ramgoolam became so angry about a defective microphone that he lost his temper and was caught on record to utter disrespectful words towards Nita Deerpalsing who also held the position of Director of Communication of the Labour Party (Mauritius). Ramgoolam's words were broadcast live by other radio stations and was reproduced several times on social media as an example of Navin Ramgoolam's lack of respect for those of the female gender.
