= Xavier-Luc Duval =

Mauritian politician (born 1958)

Xavier-Luc Duval GCSK FCA
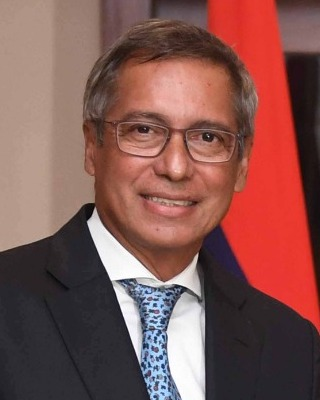
- Duval in 2024

Deputy Prime Minister of Mauritius
- In office 17 December 2014 – 19 December 2016
- President: Ameenah Gurib-Fakim
- Prime Minister: Anerood Jugnauth
- Preceded by: Rashid Beebeejaun
- Succeeded by: Ivan Collendavelloo

Leader of the Opposition
- In office 4 March 2021 – 15 April 2024
- President: Prithvirajsing Roopun
- Prime Minister: Pravind Jugnauth
- Preceded by: Arvin Boolell
- Succeeded by: Shakeel Mohamed
- In office 20 December 2016 – 14 November 2019
- President: Ameenah Gurib-Fakim
- Prime Minister: Anerood Jugnauth; Pravind Jugnauth
- Preceded by: Paul Bérenger
- Succeeded by: Arvin Boolell
Ministerial offices 2005–2016
Vice Prime Minister of Mauritius
In office 5 July 2005 – 6 June 2014
President	Anerood Jugnauth; Kailash Purryag
Prime Minister	Navin Ramgoolam
Preceded by	Position established
Succeeded by	Showkutally Soodhun
Minister of Tourism
In office 17 December 2014 – 20 December 2016
Prime Minister	Anerood Jugnauth
Preceded by	Michael Sik Yuen
Succeeded by	Ivan Collendavelloo
In office 5 July 2005 – 11 May 2010
Prime Minister	Navin Ramgoolam
Preceded by	Nando Bodha
Succeeded by	Nando Bodha
Minister of Finance and Economic Development
In office 7 August 2011 – 6 June 2014
Prime Minister	Navin Ramgoolam
Preceded by	Pravind Jugnauth
Succeeded by	Navin Ramgoolam

Personal details
- Born: 28 January 1958 (age 68)
- Party: Militant Socialist Movement (1987); Mauritian Party of Xavier-Luc Duval (1995–2009); Mauritian Social Democrat Party (2009–present)
- Spouse: Marie Jennifer Duval
- Relations: Richard Duval (brother)
- Children: Adrien; Stephanie; Alexandre
- Parent: Gaëtan Duval (father)
- Occupation: Accountant
- Website: The Minister

Charles Gaëtan Xavier-Luc Duval (born 28 January 1958) is a Mauritian politician who served as the ninth deputy prime minister of Mauritius from 2014 to 2016 in the cabinet of Anerood Jugnauth. Duval was also Minister of Tourism & External Communications and serves as 1st Member of Parliament elected from Constituency No 18, Belle Rose & Quatres Bornes. He is the leader of the Mauritian Social Democrat Party (PMSD). His party has 4 MPs at parliament and he succeeded Arvin Boolell as Leader of Opposition on 4 March 2021.

He served as Vice Prime Minister in the cabinet of Navin Ramgoolam from 2005 to June 2014. He was previously Minister of Tourism from 2005 to 2010, Minister of Social Integration from 2010 to 2011 and Minister of Finance and Economic Development from 2011 to 2014.

His first candidacy was in 1987 where he was elected to serve as Member of Parliament for Constituency No 4, Port Louis North & Montagne Longue. He was candidate of the MSM, part of the MSM/Labour Party alliance led by Jugnauth.

He later joined the Mauritian Social Democrat Party and stood as candidate for the 1991 elections where he was not elected under the Labour Party/Mauritian Social Democrat Party alliance. He later stood as candidate in 1995 under the 'Parti Geatan Duval' in constituency no 17, Curepipe and Midlands.

On 10 September 1997 Xavier Luc Duval was expelled from the PMSD by his uncle and leader of the PMSD, Hervé Duval with the support of other members of the bureau politique of the PMSD, namely Maurice Allet, Germain Comarmond, Clifford Empeigne, Mamade Khodabaccus and Vyolet Mootia. This expulsion prompted Xavier Duval to create his own party PMXD in 1999. The PMXD was dissolved in 2009 to merge with the Mauritian Social Democrat Party. He was then elected leader of the party. His party was in alliance with the Labour Party in 2005 and 2010. Due to the alliance between the Labour Party and MMM in 2014 elections, he resigned as minister on 6 June 2014 and aligned with the MSM to form the coalition of MSM–PMSD–ML, also known as Alliance Lepep, which then won a landslide victory. He held the title of Deputy Prime Minister from December 2014 to December 2016 under Prime Minister Anerood Jugnauth.

== Early life and family life ==
Xavier Luc Duval is the son of Sir Gaetan Duval, former leader of the opposition, later Deputy Prime Minister, leader of the PMSD and also founder of defunct Parti Gaëtan Duval.

Xavier Duval is married to Marie Jennifer Duval and is father of three children; Stephanie Duval, Alexandre Duval and Adrien Charles Duval.

== Education and professional career ==
Xavier Luc Duval holds a B.A (Hons) in Economics from the University of Leeds in England and is a Fellow of the Institute of Chartered Accountants in England and Wales, F.C.A. During his professional career, he was a founding partner of Coopers & Lybrand and Director Abacus Financial Services. He was previously a partner at Haskins and Sells Mauritius and a founder and managing director of The Financial Training Company Mauritius Limited and Halifax Management Limited.

In October 2000, he became senior partner at Nexia, Baker & Arenson, the Mauritian representative firm of Nexia International, a worldwide network of accountants and consultants employing some 12,000 professionals in 76 countries worldwide. He held this position at Nexia Mauritius until 2006.

== Political career ==
Firstly elected as member of parliament in 1987, he was minister in 1995 in the government of Sir Anerood Jugnauth as Minister of Industry and Tourism, then became Minister of Industry, Commerce, Corporate Affairs & Financial Services in the Government led by the Mauritius Labour Party, between 1999 and 2000. He was then Minister of Tourism, Leisure and External Communications from 2005 to 2010, in the coalition again with the MLP and Minister of Social Integration from 2010 to 2011. He serves as Member of Parliament for constituency No 18, Belle Rose and Quatre Bornes since 2005.

== Minister of Tourism (2005-2010) ==
As Minister of Tourism and External Communication, Xavier-Luc Duval contributed to boost the image de marque of the destination culminating in a record in growth of tourist arrivals and revenues in 2008. During his time in office he also introduced a New Tourism Act enhanced regulations and improving the business climate to boost the tourism sector.

In 2006 with the creation of the Festival International Kreol, Xavier-Luc Duval aimed at promoting creole culture through poetry, dance and music. The festival has become a yearly event, with participation of international creole artists such as Compagnie Creole, Zouk Machine, Images, and Shaggy as well as Mauritian groups such as Sanedhip Bhimjee.

During his mandate at the Ministry of Tourism, tremendous work was done to upgrade a large number of sites, including touristic sites and residential areas, especially some places like Roche-Bois for a better integration on the train of development.

== Minister of Social Integration (2010-2011) ==
Xavier-Luc Duval was given the responsibility to launch the Ministry of Social Integration Economic Empowerment after the general elections of 2010. He created a new policy for social housing, launched a new program for the integration of the young children at grass root level, encouraged the empowerment of women and identifying new talents in vulnerable groups (through sports and arts), as economic empowerment gained a new impetus under his leadership.

== Minister of Finance and Economic Development (2011-2014) ==
As finance minister, Duval's budget focused on vulnerable groups, especially in the fields of housing and education. Special schemes include the construction of concrete cum CIS houses in poor areas or abolition of fees for the purchase of land. Financial support is given to the needy children who attend school, day care centres are created in specific areas. Generally, all students of Form 4 and Form 5 are now entitled to own a tablet.

Hon. Duval has also been very active in promoting youth employment and measures. He launched a Youth Employment Programme in 2013 which has already employed more than 5,000 youth.

In his successive Budgets Hon. Duval has emphasised on the importance of technology. Various measures have been introduced to increase internet penetration and the use of technology at school, in enterprises, at home and in various public services. E-payment is now a reality at the Mauritius Revenue Authority, tablets and wifi have been introduced at school.

Duval launched the African Centre of Excellence in 2012 which provides information, encourages networking, and facilitates projects in Africa. As Minister of Finance, Duval has twice been voted as African Finance Minister of the Year by Africa Investor – 2012 and 2013 as well as African Finance Minister of the Year by African Leadership Magazine in 2012.

In 2013 he was chosen as chairman Global Advisory Board by African Leadership Network. He also received the Distinguished Foreign Business Leadership Award by the Villanova Business School of the University of Villanova in Philadelphia, USA in 2012. In October 2013, he has been elevated to the rank of Commandeur de l'Ordre National de l'Etoile Equatoriale by President Ali Bongo Ondimba of Gabon. Africans are also encouraged to take advantage of what Mauritius has to offer with specific schemes for training. Above all, visa requirements have been waived for 50 out of 54 African countries which is a testimony of Mauritius' intention to play a major role as the perfect meeting point in Africa.

== Controversies ==
=== 2000 Transfer of state funds to Swiss Bank ===
On 22 March 2000, when he was part of the Labour-PMSD coalition, Xavier-Luc Duval's advisor Éric Stauffer made revelations about the transfer of large amounts of state funds belonging to Mauritius to a Swiss bank account. In preparation for the 1999 General Elections campaign Éric Stauffer also bought and shipped 3 fire-arms from Geneva to Mauritius. Although the fire-arms were illegal Duval managed to organise their clearance by Mauritian customs. Éric Stauffer also revealed that then Minister of Commerce Xavier-Luc Duval spent public taxpayers' funds to pay for international tourist trips during which Duval and his mistress Carole Hardy traveled to the Alps. Carole Hardy, the daughter of Miki Hardy, leader of religious sect Église Chrétienne, was also employed by Xavier-Luc Duval as his Communications Adviser. Mauritian authorities suspected Église Chrétienne to be also involved in child kidnappings. As a result Éric Stauffer could not return to Mauritius as he feared that Duval's partner Navin Ramgoolam would organise his arrest.

=== 2009 more concerns about Église Chrétienne ===
In 2009 Opposition Leader Paul Bérenger raised his concerns in the press about the dangerous links between Xavier-Luc Duval's PMSD, the Tourism Authority, Events Mauritius and Église Chrétienne. Concerns had been raised about the role of a branch of Église Chrétienne called ASPA, as well as Church Team Ministries International (CTMI) as Carole Hardy's proximity to Xavier-Luc Duval made government bodies vulnerable to an infiltration risk.

=== 2021 importation of Molnupiravir via MERCK ===
During the Private Notice Question (PNQ) session held on 9 November 2021 in the National Assembly the Minister of Health Kailesh Jagutpal revealed that private firm MERCK was the sole importer of anti-COVID drugs Molnupiravir and Ronapreve on the island of Mauritius. Kailesh Jagutpal further revealed that Xavier-Luc Duval is one of the major shareholders of that firm, given that he owns 43,200 shares of MERCK.

== Honours and awards ==
Duval was appointed as Grand Commander of The Star & Key of the Indian Ocean on the labour day of 2008 by the President Sir Anerood Jugnauth and thus uses the Prefix Hon. and post nominal GCSK.

- Grand Commander of the Star and Key of the Indian Ocean(G.C.S.K.), Republic of Mauritius – 2009
- Commandeur de l'Ordre National de l'Etoile Equatoriale de la République Gabonaise – 2013
- Distinguished Foreign Business Leadership Award by the Villanova Business School of the University of Villanova in Philadelphia, USA −2012
- African Finance Minister of the Year by African Leadership Magazine −2012
- African Finance Minister of the Year by Africa Investor −2012
- African Finance Minister of the Year by Africa Investor −2013
- Southern African Economic Development Champion Award by African Leadership Magazine – 2014
- Special Commendation from the Georgia Legislative Black Caucus, USA – 2014
- Chairman Global Advisory Board – African Leadership Network (since 2013)
- Chairman of Public Accounts Committee (PAC), (2000–2005)
