= Mauritian Militant Renewal =

Political party in Mauritius (1994–1996)

Mauritian Militant Renewal Renouveau Militant Mauricien
- Founded: 26 June 1994
- Dissolved: 1996
- Split from: Mauritian Militant Movement
- Merged into: Militant Socialist Movement
- Ideology: Socialism
- Colours: Mulberry
- Slogan: La force de l'avenir

The Mauritian Militant Renewal (French: Renouveau Militant Mauricien, RMM) was a political party in Mauritius. It was formed in June 1994 following an internal split within the Mauritian Militant Movement (MMM) between the two factions led by Prem Nababsing, who was the leader of the MMM before the split and deputy prime minister, and Paul Bérenger, then-general secretary and former leader of the MMM, respectively. The faction led by Nababsing remained in government following Bérenger's dismissal from the government in August 1993. After the Supreme Court ruled the inability of the Nababsing faction to use the colours and symbols of the MMM, the RMM was formed.

In the general election held in 1995, the Mauritian Militant Renewal formed an electoral alliance with the Militant Socialist Movement (MSM) and the Democratic Labour Movement (MTD) and contested the election. However, the electoral coalition was defeated in a landslide, having none of the candidates elected or chosen as best losers. Following the defeat, the party dissolved and merged with the MSM in 1996.

== Election results ==
=== Legislative elections ===
Election	Leader	Coalition			Seats	+/–	Position	Status
Election	Leader	Parties	Votes	%	Seats	+/–	Position	Status
1995	Prem Nababsing	RMM–MSM–MTD	330,219	19.85	0 / 66	New	8th	No seats
