= Rama Sithanen =

Politician from Mauritius (born 1954)

Rama Sithanen GCSK
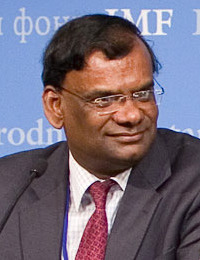
- Sithanen in 2007

Governor of the Bank of Mauritius
- In office 16 November 2024 – 29 September 2025
- Deputy: Rajeev Hasnah; Gérard Sanspeur
- Preceded by: Harvesh Seegoolam
- Succeeded by: Priscilla Muthoora Thakoor

Vice-Prime Minister of Mauritius
- In office 20 September 2008 – 11 May 2010
- Prime Minister: Navin Ramgoolam
- Preceded by: Office established
- Succeeded by: Pravind Jugnauth

Minister of Finance and Economic Empowerment Finance and Economic Development (2005–2008) Finance (1991–1995)
- In office 7 July 2005 – 11 May 2010
- Prime Minister: Navin Ramgoolam
- Preceded by: Pravind Jugnauth
- Succeeded by: Pravind Jugnauth (Finance and Economic Development)
- In office 7 September 1991 – 5 December 1995
- Prime Minister: Anerood Jugnauth
- Preceded by: Anerood Jugnauth
- Succeeded by: Rundheersing Bheenick
Parliamentary offices
Member of Parliament; for Belle Rose and Quatre Bornes
In office 5 July 2005 – 31 March 2010
Preceded by	Sushil Khushiram
Succeeded by	Kavy Ramano
In office 16 September 1991 – 16 November 1995
Preceded by	Balkrishn Gokulsing
Succeeded by	Kadress Pillay

Personal details
- Born: 21 April 1954 (age 72) Mauritius
- Party: Militant Socialist Movement; Mauritian Labour Party
- Spouse: Mrs Sithanen
- Children: 3
- Education: London School of Economics and Political Science
- Occupation: Economist

Rama Krishna Sithanen GCSK (born 21 April 1954) is a Mauritian politician and economist. He served as vice-prime minister of Mauritius from 2008 until 2010. Sithanen also served as finance minister between 1991 and 1995 when Sir Anerood Jugnauth was Prime Minister and from 2005 to 2010 under Navin Ramgoolam's cabinet. Afterwards, he was appointed as governor of the Bank of Mauritius in November 2024 until his resignation on 30 September 2025 after he was embroiled in the Menlo Park-MIC-BOM scandal.

In 2011, Sithanen worked as Director of Strategy at the African Development Bank. In the same year he took up the role of Chairman and Director of International Financial Services ("IFS"), a large management company in Mauritius. In 2016, he became the Chairman of Sanne Group PLC's Mauritius branch, following its acquisition of IFS. Between 2013 and 2017, he chaired the Rwanda Development Board. In 2022, Apex Group, a global financial solution provider, acquired Sanne Group PLC and in 2023 Dr Sithanen has become Independent Director and Chairperson of Apex Group's Mauritius group of companies.

== Background and education ==
Dr Sithanen comes from a modest background, due to poverty he was forced to abandon school to work at an early age. However, later on, young Rama took back his studies and went to London School of Economics to read economics and completed a Bsc (Econ) First Class Honours and a Msc (Econ) with distinction. Later on, during his mandate as Finance minister he obtained a PhD in Politics at the age of 51, while his thesis was 'An examination of alternative electoral systems for Mauritius' from Brunel University.

== Honours ==
He was honored by the President and was promoted to the highest rank in the Order of the Star and Key of the Indian Ocean and received the grade of Grand Commander and therefore use the prefix Hon. and post nominal GCSK.
