= Patrick Assirvaden =

Minister of Public Energy & Public Utilities

The Honorable Patrick Assirvaden MP
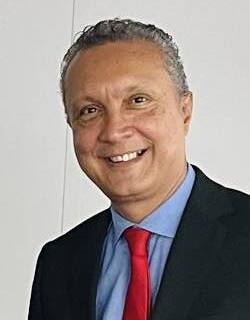
- Assirvaden in 2025
- In office 2024–ongoing
- President: Dharam Gokhool
- Prime Minister: Navinchandra Ramgoolam
- Vice President: Eddy Boissezon

Member of Parliament for constituency No.15

Personal details
- Born: Mauritius
- Party: Labour Party
- Occupation: Politician

Patrick Gervais Assirvaden is a Mauritian politician who is the current president of the Labour Party (Mauritius), and former president of the Central Electricity Board of Mauritius, serving as member of parliament.

He has been elected in constituency no. 15 La Caverne and Phoenix, during the Mauritian general elections of 2019, under the Labour Party (Mauritius).
