= Pravind Jugnauth =

Prime Minister of Mauritius from 2017 to 2024

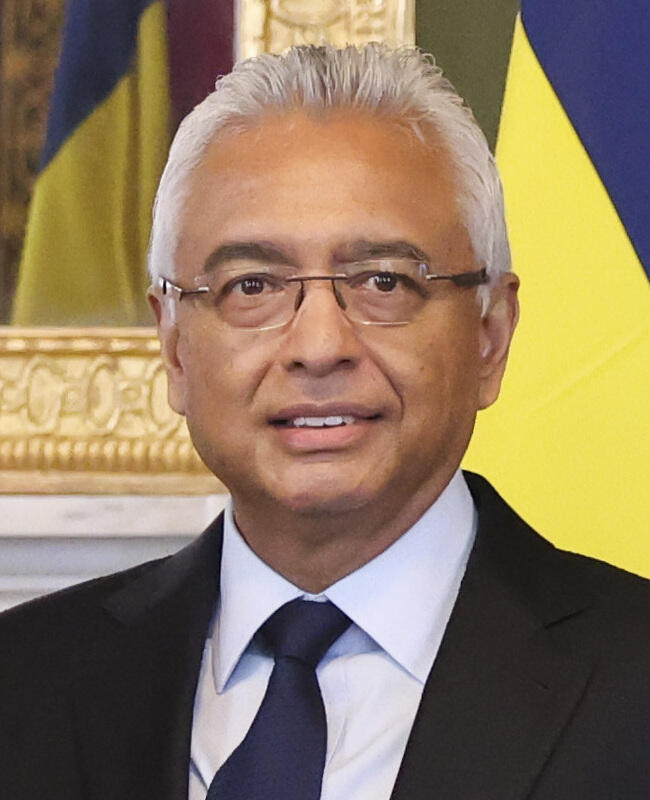
- Jugnauth in 2024

Prime Minister of Mauritius
- In office 23 January 2017 – 12 November 2024
- President: Ameenah Gurib-Fakim; Barlen Vyapoory (acting); Eddy Balancy (acting); Prithvirajsing Roopun
- Deputy: Ivan Collendavelloo; Steven Obeegadoo
- Preceded by: Anerood Jugnauth
- Succeeded by: Navin Ramgoolam

Deputy Prime Minister of Mauritius
- In office 30 September 2003 – 5 July 2005
- Prime Minister: Paul Bérenger
- Preceded by: Paul Bérenger
- Succeeded by: Rashid Beebeejaun

Vice-Prime Minister of Mauritius
- In office 11 May 2010 – 26 July 2011 Serving with Xavier-Luc Duval
- Prime Minister: Navin Ramgoolam
- Preceded by: Rama Sithanen
- Succeeded by: Anil Bachoo

Leader of Opposition
- In office 15 September 2014 – 14 December 2014
- Prime Minister: Navin Ramgoolam
- Preceded by: Paul Bérenger
- Succeeded by: Paul Bérenger

Leader of the Militant Socialist Movement
- Incumbent
- Assumed office 30 October 2003
- Preceded by: Anerood Jugnauth
Ministerial offices
Minister of Finance and Economic Development Finance (2003)
In office 25 May 2016 – 12 November 2019
Prime Minister	Anerood Jugnauth; Himself
Preceded by	Anerood Jugnauth
Succeeded by	Renganaden Padayachy (Finance, Economic Planning and Development)
In office 11 May 2009 – 26 July 2011
Prime Minister	Navin Ramgoolam
Preceded by	Rama Sithanen
Succeeded by	Xavier-Luc Duval
In office 7 October 2003 – 5 July 2005
Prime Minister	Paul Bérenger
Preceded by	Paul Bérenger
Succeeded by	Rama Sithanen
Minister of Technology, Communication and Innovation
In office 14 December 2014 – 1 July 2015
Prime Minister	Anerood Jugnauth
Preceded by	Chedumbrum Pillay
Succeeded by	Étienne Sinatambou
Parliamentary offices
Member of Parliament; for Quartier Militaire and Moka
In office 1 March 2009 – 6 October 2024
Preceded by	Ashok Jugnauth
Succeeded by	Dhaneshwar Damry
Member of Parliament; for Vieux Grand Port and Rose Belle
In office 12 September 2000 – 23 April 2005
Preceded by	Jagdish Haton
Succeeded by	Rajesh Jeetah

Personal details
- Born: Pravind Kumar Jugnauth; 25 December 1961 (age 64) La Caverne, British Mauritius
- Party: Militant Socialist Movement
- Spouse: Kobita Ramdanee
- Children: 3
- Parents: Anerood Jugnauth (father); Sarojini Ballah (mother)
- Education: University of Buckingham; Inns of Court School of Law; Aix-Marseille University
- Website: www.pravindjugnauth.mu

Pravind Kumar Jugnauth (born 25 December 1961) is a Mauritian politician and former Prime Minister, succeeding, Aneerood Jugnauth, his father, who retired as leader of the majority in 2017. Following the victory of his, Alliance Morisien, coalition in the 2019 Mauritian General Elections, he remained in office, eventually losing the 2024 Mauritian general election. Jugnauth is the leader of the Militant Socialist Movement (MSM) party. He has held a number of ministerial portfolios and also been Leader of the Opposition.

== Early life and education ==
Born on 25 December 1961 in La Caverne, a suburb area in Vacoas-Phoenix, Mauritius, Jugnauth was born into a Ahir(Yadav), Hindu family. He was born to Anerood Jugnauth, former President and prime minister of Mauritius, and Sarojini Ballah, a schoolteacher. He has an elder sister, Shalini Jugnauth-Malhotra.

After primary schooling at Aryan Vedic, he studied at Royal College Curepipe. He then went on to study law at the University of Buckingham, thus joining the Lincoln's Inn, and became a barrister. He then joined Aix-Marseille University in France where he graduated with a "diploma in civil law."

== Family life ==
Pravind Jugnauth married Kobita Ramdanee in 1992 and is the father of three daughters: Sonika, Sonali and Sara.

== Political career ==
Pravind Jugnauth entered the political arena in 1987 and officially joined the MSM in 1990.

=== 2000–2005 ===
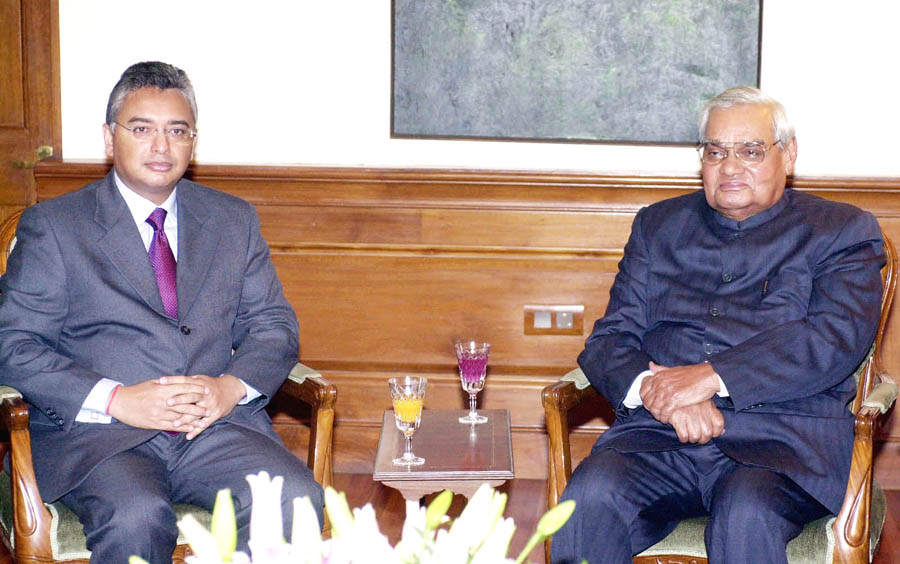
Jugnauth with Prime Minister of India Atal Bihari Vajpayee in 2004

As Minister of Agriculture from 7 September 2000 to 7 October 2003 (under MSM-MMM government), Jugnauth reformed the sugar sector by diversification with the production of ethanol, agricultural rhum, special sugars, electricity generation from bagasse and other high value-added products. Besides production costs were significantly reduced in response to a drop in the protected sugar price under the Sugar Protocol with the European Union. He also negotiated a package for workers under the Voluntary Retirement Scheme which enabled around 8000 workers to retire with cash compensation exceeding 2.5 billion rupees and around 825 arpents of land worth 3 billion rupees.

Jugnauth also encouraged hydroponics and other modern methods of agricultural production as well as agricultural biotechnology research. He created a National Agricultural Biotechnology Institute and Food Technology Laboratory in Mauritius and later launched the Small Planters Welfare Fund. The fund caters to the welfare of planters and their families and provides crop insurance schemes designed to financially support planters whose crops are affected by unfavourable weather conditions.

As Finance Minister from 7 October 2003 to 5 July 2005, Jugnauth reduced taxes on thousands of commodities. He increased subsidies on basic commodities and gave salary compensations well above inflation rates in two successive years. He launched a project to make Mauritius a Duty Free Island.

=== 2005–2009 ===
In June 2005 PM Paul Bérenger dissolved the Parliament in preparation for the 2005 General Elections. The Labour-led Alliance Sociale won a total seat of 38 against the MSM-MMM alliance which obtained only 24 seats. Pravind Jugnauth was defeated in his constituency, received 48% of vote and was not elected. Paul Berenger became Leader of the Opposition made up of MSM (14 seats) and MMM (10 seats).

In 2006 MP Ashok Jugnauth left the MSM party and formed a new party following a dispute with Pravind Jugnauth regarding the leadership of the party. At that time Pravind was not an elected member of Parliament but still held leadership of the MSM. Nando Bodha the general secretary of the MSM became Leader of the Opposition after the MSM-MMM alliance split up due to Pravind Jugnauth's disapproval of Paul Berenger's request to make Rajesh Bhagwan the Opposition Chief Whip. In 2007 two members of MSM (Joe Lesongard the party's president and Sekar Naidu) left the MSM and swore allegiance to Berenger who became Leader of the Opposition.

=== 2009–2017 ===
Ashok Jugnauth (half-brother of Sir Anerood Jugnauth and uncle of Pravind) had been elected as MSM member of parliament in Constituency No.8 Quartier Militaire and Moka. But he had to resign in November 2008 as the Queen's Privy Council upheld the guilty verdict that the Supreme Court of Mauritius had issued in 2007 following charges of electoral bribery during the campaign leading to the 2005 General Elections. Thus by-elections had to be held in 2009. Ashok Jugnauth stood as a candidate with the support of MMM. The Labour Party supported Pravind Jugnauth who then announced his candidacy in the 8th constituency. On 2 March 2009, Pravind Jugnauth won the by-elections. His victory paved the way for the next alliance (Labour Party-MSM) during the 2010 general elections.

In 2009, MSM formed a coalition known as Alliance de L'Avenir or Ptr-MSM-PMSD by joining forces with the Mauritian Labour Party and Mauritian Social Democrat Party. The coalition won the May 2010 elections. On Navin Ramgoolam's advice, President Sir Anerood Jugnauth then appointed Jugnauth Vice Prime Minister & Minister of Finance as of 11 May 2010. On 26 July 2011 Jugnauth and all other MSM ministers resigned due to the scandal known as the MedPoint Affair.

In 2014, following the resignation of Paul Berenger as Leader of the Opposition, President Kailash Purryag appointed Jugnauth to the office. Jugnauth served as Leader of the Opposition from September to December 2014.

He was appointed Minister of Information Technology following the Alliance Lepep's victory.

== Premiership (2017–2024) ==
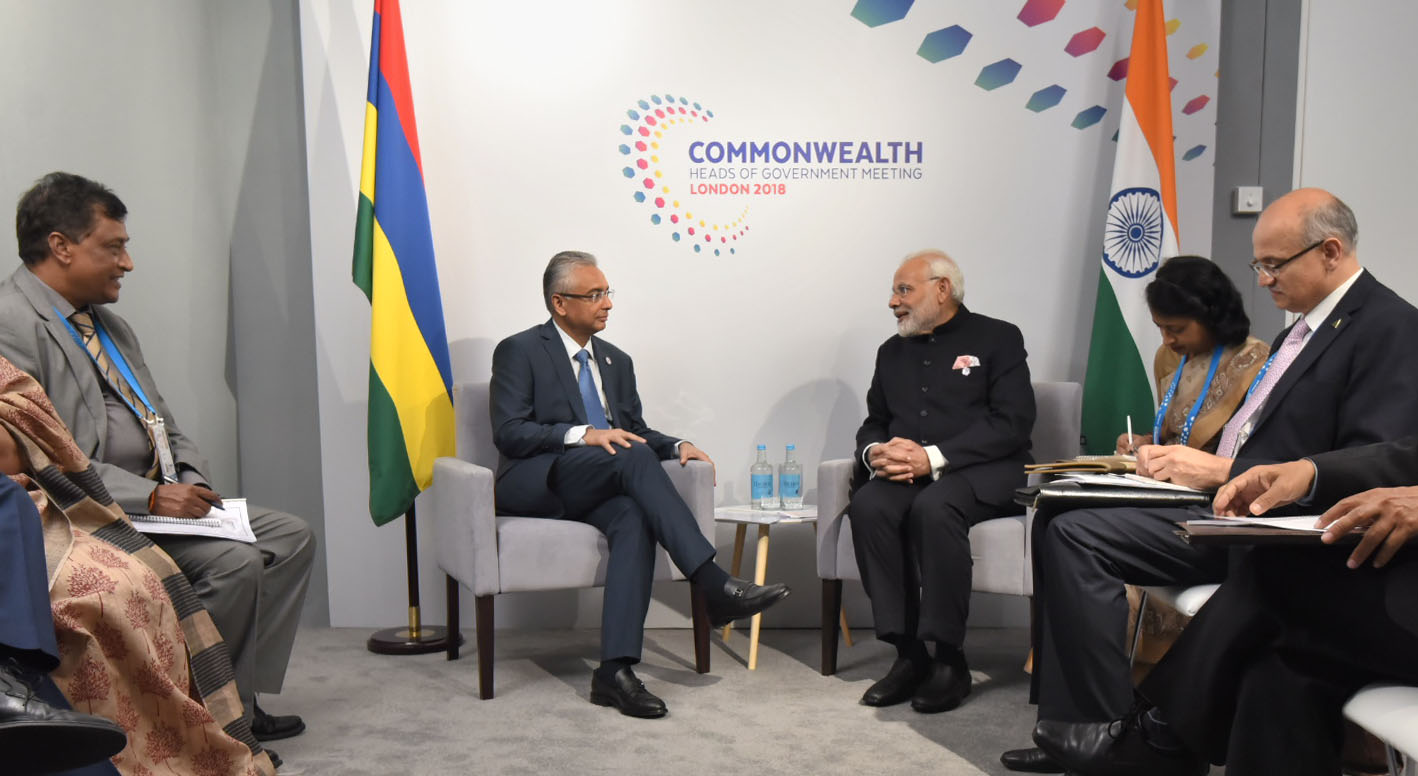
Jugnauth with Indian PM Narendra Modi, 19 April 2018

On 23 January 2017, he was chosen by his party MSM to lead the National Assembly. This triggered the ruling coalition partner Parti Mauricien Social Démocrate to leave the government and join the Opposition. Pravind Jugnauth served as PM of Mauritius during the second half of the Alliance Lepep's mandate which concluded with general elections in November 2019.

Following the victory of the Alliance Morisien (a coalition of MSM-ML-MAG parties) at the 2019 General Elections Pravind Jugnauth was elected as PM for a five-year mandate.

Until 2024, the sovereignty of the Chagos Archipelago in the Indian Ocean was disputed between the United Kingdom and Mauritius. In February 2019, the International Court of Justice in The Hague ruled that the United Kingdom must transfer the islands to Mauritius as they were illegally separated from the latter in 1965. At first, the UK did not recognise Mauritius' sovereignty claim over the Chagos Archipelago. In October 2020, Jugnauth described the British and American governments as "hypocrites" and "champions of double talk" over their response to the dispute. In a joint declaration by Jugnauth and British prime minister Keir Starmer issued on 3 October 2024, it was announced that an agreement had been reached between the UK and Mauritius about the return of the archipelago to Mauritian sovereignty. Under the agreement, most of the territory constituting the archipelago will be given to Mauritius, while the island of Diego Garcia will remain under the jurisdiction of the UK and USA for at least 99 years, pending the ratification of a treaty between the UK and Mauritius.

Jugnauth conceded his government losing in the 2024 Mauritian general election.

== Controversies ==
=== Before 2020 ===
==== Medpoint Gate ====
In 2010, the PTR-MSM-PMSD government acknowledged the need to create a specialized centre for geriatric care. Thus the cabinet of Ministers approved the purchase of the existing MedPoint Private Clinic which was owned by Dr. Krishnan Malhotra and Mrs Shalini Devi Jugnauth-Malhotra. The latter is the sister of then Minister of Finance Pravind Jugnauth and daughter of then President Sir Anerood Jugnauth. The objective was to convert the hospital into a specialised centre.

On 22 July 2011 following an investigation by the Independent Commission Against Corruption (ICAC), then Minister of Health Maya Hanoomanjee was arrested by the ICAC Police and the government chief valuer was suspended from his duties. Pravind Jugnauth was also arrested on charges of "conflict of interest". This became known as the MedPoint Affair. On 30 June 2015 Jugnauth was found guilty under Article 13 of the Prevention Of Corruption Act 2002 (PoCA). He was sentenced by the Intermediate court of Mauritius for 1 year of imprisonment. However, he appealed to the Supreme Court of Mauritius and won his appeal. The prosecution appealed to the UK Privy Council which is constitutionally Mauritius' Highest Appeal Court, but the prosecution appeal was ultimately unsuccessful.

==== Case of Sedition ====
On 26 December 2012 Pravind Jugnauth was arrested and interrogated by Central CID on charges of sedition. This followed a complaint lodged by former minister Sheila Bappoo of the Labour Party after Pravind Jugnauth's revelations about the abuse of power and financial scandals involving Navin Ramgoolam's girlfriend Nandanee Soornack. Pravind Jugnauth's arrest was decried as being arbitrary and a form of harassment by Navin Ramgoolam, as the previous application of the anti-sedition law dated back to 1972. Lawyer Roshi Bhadain assisted Pravind Jugnauth in his legal defence. This coincided with Jugnauth's public comments about minister Bappoo's silence and lack of action regarding the paedophilia scandal at the MITD involving instructor Chedumbrum and a 14 year-old student.

=== 2020 and onwards ===
==== Wakashio Disaster ====
The wrecking of the MV Wakashio was not only an environmental catastrophe but also raised questions about the government's handling of the crisis. When the ship grounded on 25 July 2020, no immediate action was taken, even though the potential risk of an oil spill was evident. The delay in mobilizing resources and seeking international assistance has been criticized as a failure of leadership under Jugnauth's administration. Despite warnings from experts and environmental activists, the government took nearly two weeks to declare a state of environmental emergency on August 7, after the oil spill had already begun on August 6. This delay allowed the situation to worsen significantly. The government’s decision-making process, including its choice to tow part of the wreck into the ocean and sink it, was seen as opaque. Many experts and environmentalists argued that the wreckage could have been better utilized to negotiate compensation from the ship’s owner or insurers. The handling of the crisis led to widespread protests in Mauritius, with thousands demanding accountability and accusing the government of incompetence and corruption. There were also allegations that the government ignored early offers of international assistance, which could have mitigated the disaster. Critics argue that the government failed to leverage international maritime laws effectively to secure adequate compensation, particularly given the limitations of the 2001 Bunker Oil Convention, which caps liability based on the ship's gross tonnage. These points contributed to a perception that the government, and by extension Jugnauth, mishandled the crisis, prioritizing political and economic interests over environmental and public welfare.

==== Death of Soopramanien Kistnen ====
Soopraanien Kistnen, an MSM party agent, went missing in October 2020. His charred body was found in a sugarcane field. The authorities initially claimed that Soopramanien Kistnen's death was a suicide. These were the Mauritius Police Force, particularly investigators from the Major Crime Investigation Team (MCIT). They attributed his death to personal and financial issues. However, this conclusion was heavily criticized due to inconsistencies in their findings and alleged lack of thorough investigation. The narrative of suicide was challenged following irregularities such as the condition of the body, rapid removal of crime scene, evidence after independent forensic analyses, a judicial inquiry, and public outcry. These revealed evidence of foul play and pointed to potential whistleblowing against corruption and political connections.

A magistrate's inquiry labeled it a murder and criticized police inefficiency. Key motives included potential exposure of corruption, election fraud, and illegal contract allocations. Kistnen had ties with the party members, and was reportedly preparing to expose misuse of funds related to public contracts and corruption involving political figures. One of them being Yogida Sawmynaden, a former minister. Accusations of police and political interference to obscure facts, such as protecting individuals implicated in the corruption schemes. Vimla Kistnen, his wife, also revealed that her husband met with Jugnauth himself in the PMO the day before he disappeared.

The case attracted extensive media attention, with journalists and activists questioning the legitimacy of the investigators themselves. Public protests highlighted the growing distrust in State institutions.

==== Pack & Blister Scandal ====
The "Pack & Blister" scandal in Mauritius during July 2020 revolved around the purchase of malfunctioning ventilators during the COVID-19 pandemic. The government ordered these ventilators, reportedly at inflated prices, through Pack & Blister, a company with no track record in medical equipment. The scandal highlighted poor procurement procedures and a lack of accountability. Jugnauth's role became contentious when it was revealed that key information regarding the deal was either ignored or dismissed at the highest levels. While he eventually acknowledged the issue, critics argued that he should have been more proactive in overseeing the procurement process, ensuring transparency, and addressing potential corruption earlier. The failure to act swiftly and decisively led to public outcry, with many questioning the government's commitment to accountability. This scandal is part of a broader pattern of questionable contracts and procurement processes during the pandemic, casting a shadow over Jugnauth's leadership in safeguarding public funds and maintaining oversight of critical decisions.

==== Molnupiravir Scandal ====
The core issue in the Molnupiravir scandal around December 2021 was the alleged overpricing of medicine. The Ministry of Health awarded a Rs80 million contract to CPN Distributors, a company with no significant pharmaceutical experience, eight times higher than the price that Mauritius Pharmacy had offered for the procurement of the medicine as another contractor. This has raised concerns about transparency and potential misuse of public funds. This massive markup sparked outrage, with critics accusing the government of financial mismanagement and possible corruption. Allegations also included political favoritism, as some claimed the procurement process was manipulated to benefit connected individuals. These revelations led to investigations by the Independent Commission Against Corruption (ICAC), though the process faced criticism for being selective and ineffective.

==== Sniffing Scandal at Baie du Jacotet ====
The sniffing scandal revolves around the controversial actions of an Indian technical team that, in April 2022, was allowed by the PMO to access the sensitive Baie-du-Jacotet landing station, which connects to the SAFE submarine cable network. Allegations arose that the team, under the guise of a survey, was involved in the unauthorized interception of internet data—a practice known as "sniffing." CEO of Mauritius Telecom (MT) who resigned following this, Sherry Singh, claimed that the operation was not just a survey but a covert data-capturing mission, with the involvement of a mysterious figure referred to as "Missier Moustass" (the "moustache man") who was the head of the team. When initially questioned, Jugnauth was irritated and showed signs of frustration to the journalists. Jugnauth made another press appearance later and denied these allegations, insisting the Indian team's visit was part of a legitimate survey.

However the scandal intensified with Sherry Singh appearances in news outlets like Defimedia.info and L'Express.mu with camera footage displayed, with record number of viewers online(~100k). This also lead to the arrest of journalist Nawaaz Noorbux who was questioned by the Police and eventually released. Even the Minister of Information and Communications Technology, Deepak Balgobin intervened in a press conference. However, Balgobin's claim that a laptop involved in such activity would have exploded drew public ridicule.

Mauritius Telecom's Chief Technical Officer (CTO), Girish Guddoy, who had accompanied the Indian team, also resigned after claiming that he had been coerced into signing misleading reports that downplayed the true nature of the operation. The scandal has had profound political and diplomatic repercussions. Opposition leaders accused Jugnauth of violating national sovereignty and engaging in treasonous acts by facilitating the intrusion into Mauritius' critical internet infrastructure without proper oversight or transparency and also accused of doing delaying tactics to evade from the scandal. In November 2024 however, with the Moustass Leaks, recordings began to emerge with conversations between top officials, including Jugnauth's close associates, allegedly pressuring technical staff to alter statements regarding the activities at the station, all of which, were ongoing in the Judicial Court.

==== Missie Moustass Leaks Scandal ====
Missie Moustass (Mr Moustache) leaks was the phone tapping scandal that started around mid-October 2024. It has proven to be the most controversial scandal revealed during the 2019-24 mandate under Jugnauth's government. The scandal first emerged on Facebook where recordings of phone conversations between various Mauritian personalities were released upon videos posted by the account of Missie Moustass. During that first time, phone conversations between politicians like Navinchandra Ramgoolam, Paul Raymond Berenger, Patrick Assirvaden and Shakeel Mohamed those of journalists being Nawaaz Noorbux, Al-khizr Ramdin and Murvind Beetun and also some diplomats. Additionally, the said politicians and journalists affirmed that it was indeed their voices and that the recordings were true. Mauritian authorities quickly responded by alerting Facebook Africa, and the account was eventually banned. Yet, it did not end there and the unknown figure, Missie Moustass, made another account on TikTok. Of the releases there, had the voices of the Speaker of the National Assembly, Sooroojdev Phokeer and Pravind Jugnauth, the PM were heard where he was asked by Phokeer whether he was fine with the Private Notice Question related to the sniffing scandal from the then Leader of the Opposition, Xavier-Luc Duval or whether part of the question could be removed.

Mauritian authorities again intervened with bringing justifications to the TikTok platform and the account was eventually banned. When questioned by journalists, Jugnauth initially declared that the recordings were AI based and spread falsehoods, however with public and media pressure, the AI thesis was eventually proven to be very weak.

A third account of 'Missie Moustass' was then made on YouTube. Other very shocking revelations were made and heard that included:

- The Commissioner of Police, Anil Kumar Dip directing the Chief Police Medical Inspector, Sp Gungadin for a coverup to declare the death of Jacquelin Juliette as natural cause in contrary to the autopsy that confirmed he actually died due to groin injury linked to police brutality.
- Anil Kumar Dip uttering offensive words during one of his conversations, against the Virgin Mary. These such words took a massive escalation among members public requesting his resignation or dismissal. He instead put the blame on AI manipulation and no actions were taken nevertheless.
- Jugnauth himself saying out foul languages during his conversation with Finance Minister Renganaden Padayachy, as apparently, an officer of the Ministry was not 'cooperating' with him to terminate the contact of the Mauritius Turf Club to give the horse racing monopoly to his MSM's protected People's Turf Club.
- PMO advisors Zooberr Joomaye and Sanjiv Ramdenee exchanging words where Joomaye said he called then-Mauritius Telecom CEO Sherry Singh following the riots of 22 April 2022, urging him to slow internet countrywide. The latter refused saying it was an impossible task.
- Jugnauth himself being directed by his wife Kobita Ramdanee in carrying out political nominations, based on political affiliations.
- Rs 250 Million being transferred directly into Jugnauth's bank account from his conversation with Showkutally Soodun, Mauritius' Ambassador in Saudi Arabia and the UAE from unknown third parties.
- Xavier-Luc Duval, the Leader of Opposition leaking his Private Notice Questions, the day before sessions of the National Assembly, to Rakesh Gooljaury, a close associate of Pravind who passed them onto him, the Prime Minister at the time.
- Words of Paying bouncers for Killing and throwing away with no other choice left shared between Jugnauth's wife, Kobita Ramdanee and Showkutally Soodun.
- The Indian High Commissioner in Mauritius was heavily criticised in a conversation between Ramdanee and Sarah Currimjee. Ramdanee described her as a very ugly woman and a prostitute.

Following these postings, authorities namely the Special Striking Team under the Mauritius Police Force arrested five suspects including Sherry Singh who were brought to the Bail and Remand Court. after Pravind's close affiliate, Rakesh Gooljaury lodged a case against them to the Central Criminal Investigation Department, accusing them of Cyber Terrorism The suspects were eventually released following a court order due to no probable cause. This scandal has further raised concerns about the principles of meritocracy, democratic governance and independence of Public Institutions. The true identity of Missie Moustass remains unknown to this day.

==== Social Media Blockage Following Moustass Leaks ====
On 1 November 2024, following the Moustass Leaks Scandal, the Prime Minister's Office under Jugnauth, took the decision to block social media nationwide and ordered the Information and Communications Technology Authority (ICTA) to give directives to all Telecommunication Operators such as My.t and Emtel, to suspend access to social media platforms until 11 November 2024 under the thesis of potential impact to National Security and Public Safety due to supposedly illegal postings from Missie Moustass. With however no valid proof as such, this sparked massive public outrage nationwide who condemned it as a dictatorial move from Jugnauth. The Mauritians managed to outrun the suspension by using VPN apps that acted as a barrier from the blockage, allowing for greater privacy and autonomy. The decision was eventually urgently reviewed by the PMO and a back-pedal was made the next day where the suspension ended. This suspension proved to be one of the fatal moves by Jugnauth's Government that contributed to his coalition's sweeping 60-0 loss in the 2024 General Elections.

==== Money Laundering Charges ====
On 16 February 2025, Pravind Jugnauth was arrested on charges related to money laundering but was released later that day after posting bail.

Josian Delawon, a close associate of Jugnauth’s brother-in-law, was known to attend his "White Parties" at the Maradiva hotel and to have had meals with the Prime Minister. Despite Jugnauth’s claim that he did not know Delawon, photographs have surfaced showing the two together.

Following his interrogation at the Financial Crimes Commission, Josian Delawon revealed that he had been asked by Pravind Jugnauth to safeguard certain suitcases, which were allegedly given to him by the deputy mayor of Vacoas-Phoenix, known by the nickname "Marchand Culotte" (translated as "Panty Seller"). The nickname refers to the deputy mayor's previous business of selling underwear at the Vacoas market. It is reported that this business was highly profitable, with “Madame Culotte” owning two luxury sedans.

In a development soon after Delawon’s release on bail in connection with the suitcases, “Madame Culotte” was appointed mayor of Vacoas-Phoenix, replacing the incumbent, who was overseas.

The suitcases in question reportedly left Prime Minister Jugnauth’s residence without his knowledge or consent and were handed to Delawon by the deputy mayor. The suitcases contained luxury watches, foreign currencies totaling Rs 114 million, and documents belonging to the Jugnauth family. One of the suitcases was said to be equipped with a tracker, which allowed the individual who placed it to monitor its whereabouts.

It is suggested that the suitcases, stored at a location in Pointe aux Canonniers, were part of a broader strategy to evade detection during police searches. Sources indicate that several similar suitcases have been used in the past to remove cash or potentially illicit items in anticipation of police action.

There have been claims that following the elections, numerous suitcases were transported out of Mauritius, with some associates of the ruling party allegedly acting as couriers. These individuals are thought to have benefited from connections at Air Mauritius, which may have facilitated their movements.

Critics argue that this situation mirrors a similar scandal that occurred a decade ago, when suitcases linked to "Lady Cotomili" reportedly left the country after the elections. The current allegations suggest that the pattern of using suitcases to move assets may have continued, raising questions about the use of tracking devices and the individuals controlling their movement.

== Awards and honours ==
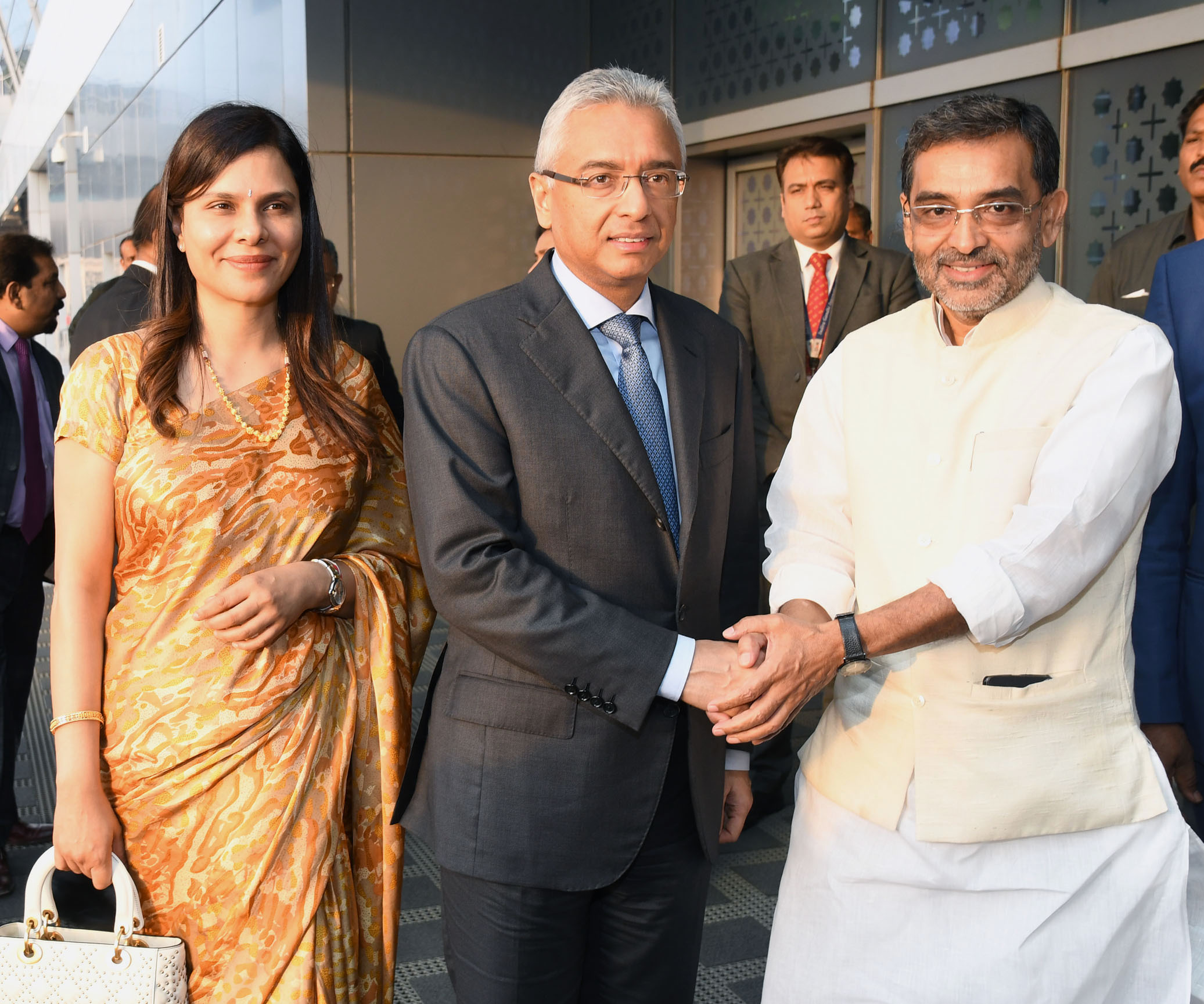
Pravind Kumar Jugnauth and Mrs. Kobita Ramdanee-Jugnauth being received by the Minister of State for Human Resource Development, Shri Upendra Kushwaha, on their arrival at IGI Airport, in New Delhi.

  (India)
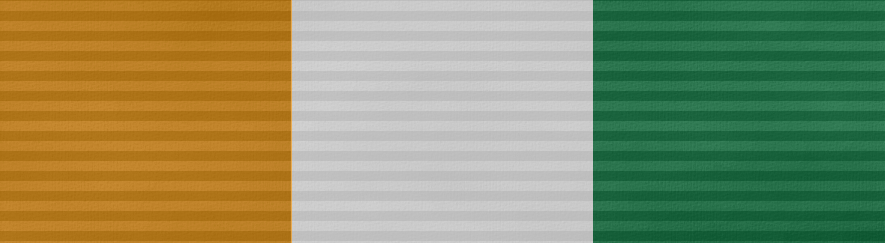
  - Pravasi Bharatiya Samman

Pravind Jugnauth was honoured Doctor from the University of Buckingham with an Honoris Causa in 2005. In 2017 he has awarded the Pravasi Bharatiya Samman by the President of India.

Political offices
Preceded by Anerood Jugnauth	Prime Minister of Mauritius; 2017–2024	Succeeded by Navin Ramgoolam
