= Paul Bérenger =

Prime Minister of Mauritius from 2003 to 2005

The Honourable Paul Bérenger GCSK
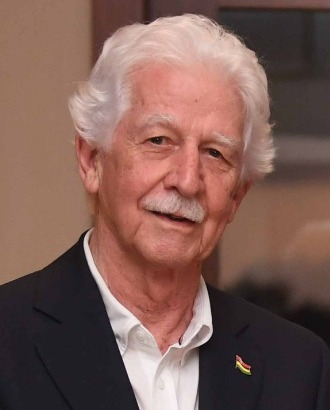
- Bérenger in 2024

Prime Minister of Mauritius
- In office 30 September 2003 – 5 July 2005
- President: Karl Offmann; Anerood Jugnauth
- Deputy: Pravind Jugnauth
- Preceded by: Anerood Jugnauth
- Succeeded by: Navin Ramgoolam

Deputy Prime Minister of Mauritius
- In office 22 November 2024 – 20 March 2026
- President: Prithvirajsing Roopun; Dharam Gokhool
- Prime Minister: Navin Ramgoolam
- Preceded by: Steven Obeegadoo
- Succeeded by: Arianne Navarre-Marie
- In office 17 September 2000 – 30 September 2003
- President: Cassam Uteem; Karl Offmann
- Prime Minister: Anerood Jugnauth
- Preceded by: Kailash Purryag
- Succeeded by: Pravind Jugnauth
- In office 30 December 1995 – 20 June 1997
- President: Cassam Uteem
- Prime Minister: Navin Ramgoolam
- Preceded by: Kailash Purryag
- Succeeded by: Kailash Purryag
Ministerial offices
Minister of Finance
In office 17 September 2000 – 30 September 2003
Prime Minister	Anerood Jugnauth
Preceded by	Vasant Bunwaree
Succeeded by	Pravind Jugnauth
In office 15 June 1982 – 22 March 1983
Prime Minister	Anerood Jugnauth
Preceded by	Veerasamy Ringadoo
Succeeded by	Anerood Jugnauth
Minister of Foreign Affairs, International Trade and Regional Cooperation
In office 30 December 1995 – 20 June 1997
Prime Minister	Navin Ramgoolam
Preceded by	Ramduthsing Jaddoo
Succeeded by	Navin Ramgoolam
Minister of External Affairs
In office 27 September 1991 – 18 August 1993
Prime Minister	Anerood Jugnauth
Preceded by	Jean-Claude de l'Estrac
Succeeded by	Swalay Kasenally
Opposition offices
Leader of the Opposition
In office 17 December 2014 – 20 December 2016
President	Kailash Purryag; Ameenah Gurib
Prime Minister	Anerood Jugnauth
Preceded by	Pravind Jugnauth
Succeeded by	Xavier-Luc Duval
In office 1 October 2013 – 15 September 2014
President	Kailash Purryag
Prime Minister	Navin Ramgoolam
Preceded by	Alan Ganoo
Succeeded by	Pravind Jugnauth
In office 27 September 2007 – 23 January 2013
President	Anerood Jugnauth; Kailash Purryag
Prime Minister	Navin Ramgoolam
Preceded by	Nando Bodha
Succeeded by	Alan Ganoo
In office 5 July 2005 – 5 July 2006
President	Anerood Jugnauth
Prime Minister	Navin Ramgoolam
Preceded by	Navin Ramgoolam
Succeeded by	Nando Bodha
In office 5 July 1997 – 11 September 2000
President	Cassam Uteem
Prime Minister	Anerood Jugnauth
Preceded by	Navin Ramgoolam
Succeeded by	Nicolas Von Mally
In office 21 August 1983 – 30 August 1987
Monarch	Elizabeth II
Governors General	Seewoosagur Ramgoolam; Veerasamy Ringadoo
Prime Minister	Anerood Jugnauth
Preceded by	Gaëtan Duval
Succeeded by	Prem Nababsing
Parliamentary offices
Member of Parliament; for Stanley and Rose Hill
Incumbent
Assumed office 28 January 1995
Preceded by	Himself
In office 15 September 1991 – 29 November 1994
Preceded by	Shirin Aumeeruddy-Cziffra
Succeeded by	Himself
Member of Parliament; for Belle Rose and Quatre Bornes
In office 20 December 1976 – 3 July 1987
Preceded by	Maurice Lesage
Succeeded by	None

Leader of the Mauritian Militant Movement
- In office 19 October 2013 – 13 April 2026
- Preceded by: Alan Ganoo
- Succeeded by: Vacant

Personal details
- Born: 26 March 1945 (age 81) Curepipe, British Mauritius
- Party: Fron Militan Progresis (since 2026)
- Other political affiliations: Mauritian Militant Movement (1969–2026)
- Spouse: Arline Perrier (m. 1971)
- Children: Julie; Paul-Emmanuel; Joanna
- Education: Bangor University

Paul Raymond Bérenger (born 26 March 1945) is a Mauritian politician who served as the fourth prime minister of Mauritius from 2003 to 2005. Bérenger previously served as deputy prime minister three times: from 1995 to 1997, 2000 to 2003 and 2024 to 2026.

He has served as foreign minister and finance minister, twice, in the governments of Anerood Jugnauth and Navin Ramgoolam. Bérenger, a Catholic, is the only Christian and Franco-Mauritian who has served as Prime Minister of the country.

He has been Leader of the Opposition on several occasions – from 1983 to 1987, 1997 to 2000, 2005 to 2006 and 2007 to 2016, with brief hiatuses. Bérenger holds the longest-serving record in this constitutional position.

== Early life, education and family ==
Bérenger was born to Mauritian parents whose ancestors arrived in Mauritius from France in the 1700s. Geneviève Bérenger, his mother, was the daughter of Auguste Esnouf, an engineer and author who used pen name Savinien Mérédac to write novels and newspaper articles. He completed his secondary schooling at the Collège du Saint-Esprit in Quatre Bornes. He travelled to the UK to study Philosophy and French, attended the Sorbonne in Paris and graduated from the Bangor University with a BA Hons in philosophy and French. He later worked as a Trade Unionist from 1970 to 1982 and was elected to the Legislative Assembly for the first time in December 1976.

== Political career ==
Bérenger founded the Mauritian Militant Movement in 1969 along with Dev Virahsawmy and the Jeerooburkhan brothers. This party has always received more than 40% of direct votes in general elections.

=== Azor Adelaide murder ===
In 1971 Bérenger narrowly escaped a murder attempt, whilst his assistant Azor Adelaide died soon after being shot by rival political activists on Chasteauneuf Street in Curepipe.

=== Member of Parliament ===
Bérenger was first elected in Constituency No. 18 (Belle Rose and Quatre Bornes) at the December 1976 elections. The remaining 2 seats were secured by Independence Party (Labour-CAM) candidates James Burty David and Heeralall Bhugaloo. The general elections of 1976 turned out to be a three-way contest between the Independence Party (Labour-CAM coalition), the Parti Mauricien Social Démocrate (PMSD), and the MMM. There was a hung parliament, with 34 of the 70 seats in the National Assembly going to the MMM, 28 seats to the Labour Party, and 8 seats to the PMSD. Ramgoolam remained in office, however, by forging a coalition with the PMSD for a bare majority. Anerood Jugnauth was appointed Leader of the Opposition.

=== In government and split (1982–1983) ===
At the June 1982 general election, Bérenger was elected in Constituency No. 18 (Belle Rose and Quatre Bornes) at the top of the list as a candidate of the MMM-PSM coalition. His running mates Kailash Ruhee and Devanand Routho secured the remaining seats in that constituency. The alliance won all 60 directly elected seats in the Legislative Assembly (except for two seats allocated to Rodrigues Island). Jugnauth became prime minister and Harish Boodhoo was appointed deputy prime minister. Bérenger subsequently became the minister of finance.

In February 1983, fearing a coup d'état by Bérenger, Jugnauth sought for help from the Indian prime minister Indira Gandhi in case such an event materialises. The military operation was codenamed Operation Lal Dora and Indian troops were to be deployed secretly to Mauritius. While Jugnauth was on a trip to India during a Non-Aligned Movement summit, Bérenger arranged for the Mauritian national anthem to be played on Independence Day in Creole and referred to it as the national language, rather than English.

Afterwards, Bérenger proposed a constitutional amendment removing the executive powers of the prime minister and entrusting them to the cabinet collectively. In this, he was supported by Harish Boodhoo, but Jugnauth strongly objected. Bérenger then sought a parliamentary motion of no confidence to have Jugnauth replaced as prime minister by Prem Nababsing. Before the Legislative Assembly could vote on the matter, however, Jugnauth dissolved Parliament without any notice and called for new elections in August 1983. Jugnauth formed a new political party, the Militant Socialist Movement, after the members of the MMM split in the aftermath of the falling out.

=== Wilderness (1983–1990) ===
In the 1983 general election, Bérenger stood as candidate of the MMM in Constituency No. 18 (Belle Rose and Quatre Bornes). But this time he was not elected whilst his rivals Michael Glover, Anil Gayan and Raj Virahsawmy of the MSM-Labour coalition were elected in that constituency. However, Bérenger was narrowly returned as a member after the allocation of additional seats to the Assembly, which was mandated by the constitution.

In 1987, he was not re-elected for his seat, nor was he allocated a seat under the best-loser system. His rivals of the MSM-Labour coalition (Michael Glover, Balkrishn Gokulsing and Raj Virahsawmy) were elected to the Legislative Assembly.

=== Second alliance with Jugnauth (1990–1993) ===
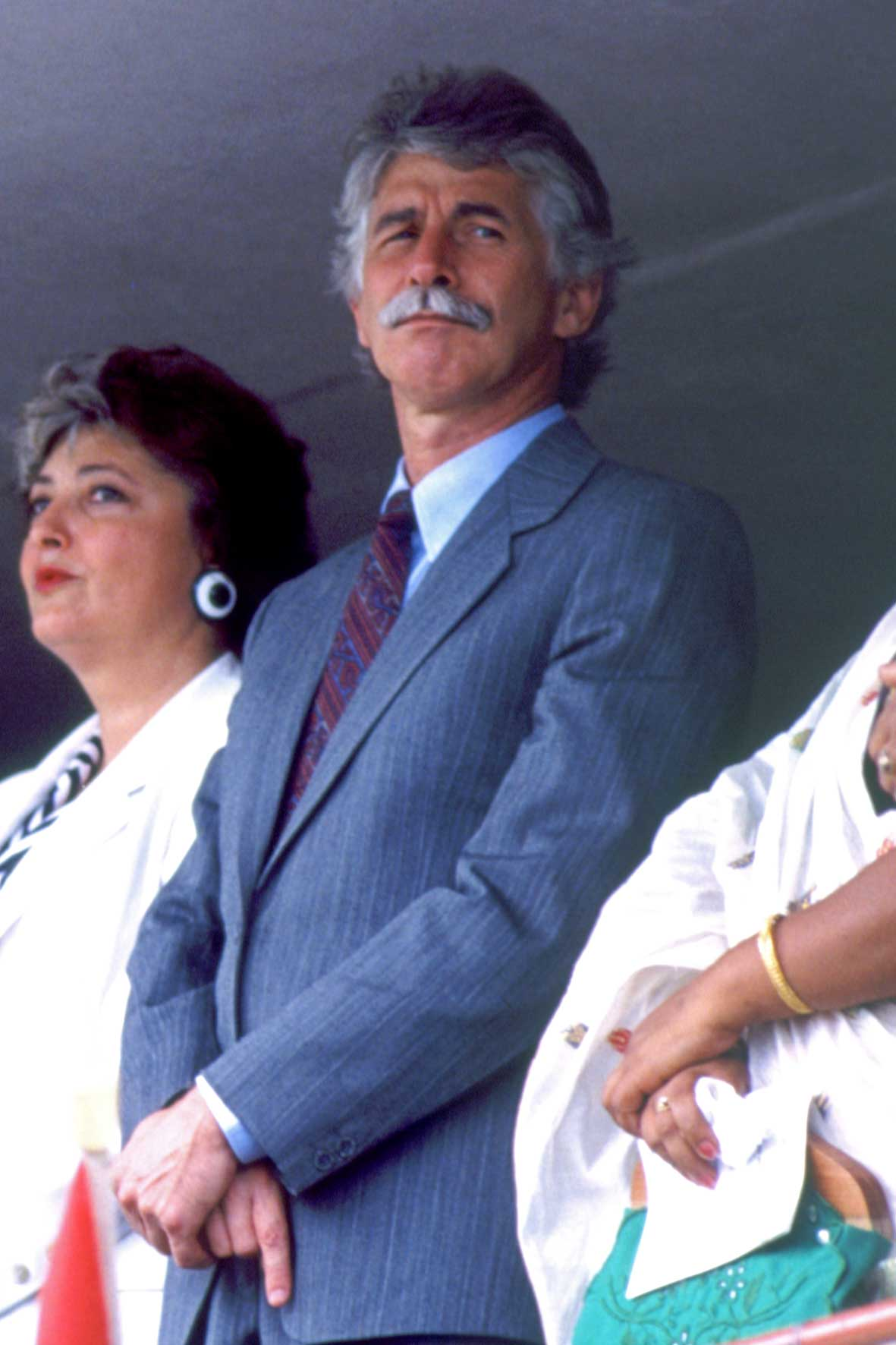
Berenger and his wife Arriane on Republic Day 1992

At the August 1991 general elections Bérenger was elected to the Legislative Assembly under the MSM-MMM coalition in Constituency No. 19 (Stanley and Rose Hill) behind his running mates Jayen Cuttaree and Jean Claude de L'Estrac.

On 18 August 1993, Jugnauth dismissed Bérenger and all Members of the MMM from the government and formed a new majority with the other parties.

=== Opposition and alliance with Ramgoolam (1994–1997) ===
In January 1995 Bérenger and Jean Claude de L'Estrac resigned from parliament, triggering by-elections in Constituency No.19. Bérenger was elected under the banner of the Labour-MMM coalition.

As a candidate of the Labour-MMM coalition Bérenger was elected in Constituency No. 19 (Stanley and Rose Hill) at the December 1995 elections, ahead of his running mates Siddick Chady and Jayen Cuttaree. This alliance won the 1995 elections with a 60-nil sweep of mainland Mauritian constituencies. Ramgoolam became prime minister with Bérenger as his deputy. On 20 June 1997, however, Ramgoolam dismissed Bérenger and formed a new government without the MMM.

=== Renewed alliance and premiership (1994–2005) ===
In 1999, the national opinion polls showed that Prime Minister Navin Ramgoolam's Labour Party was the favorite to win the elections due in 2000. In an hour-long meeting organized by Bodhoo, Berenger made up his quarrel with Jugnauth and agreed to an electoral alliance and a power-sharing deal, should they win the election. The MSM and the MMM would each contest 30 of the 60 mainland seats. If successful, Jugnauth would serve as prime minister for three years; he would then resign, assume the (largely, but not entirely, ceremonial) office of President of Mauritius and make way for Bérenger to succeed him as prime minister, with Jugnauth's son Pravind Jugnauth as his deputy.

The MSM/MMM alliance won 54 of the 60 seats. Jugnauth became prime minister again, appointing a 25-member Cabinet with Bérenger as deputy prime minister.

The power-sharing agreement was briefly in doubt when, in 2001, Bérenger faced a charge of aiding and abetting a murder suspect to escape arrest. Swaleha Joomun, a widow, was suing the deputy premier for facilitating the escape of Bissessur who was wanted in connection with a triple murder which occurred on 26 October 1996 in Port Louis. Joomun's husband was a victim of the murder. Bérenger defended himself by saying that the reason he had helped Bissessur was because the latter wanted to reveal what he knew on the escadron de la mort (death squad). A second private prosecution was lodged against Bérenger by Raju Mohit (a member of the Movement Republicain) but in both cases, the Director of Public Prosecutions of Mauritius gave a Nolle Prosequi.

In 2003, Bérenger duly succeeded Jugnauth, who assumed the presidency, as agreed.

In 2003, Berenger took office as prime minister following the resignation of then Prime Minister Jugnauth after serving as his deputy for three years. He led the MSM/MMM coalition government for a period of one year and nine months before his alliance lost the elections to the Labour Party in 2005. He was the first and only non-Hindu prime minister.

Paul Berenger remained Deputy Prime Minister of Mauritius for three years and following the agreement, Anerood Jugnauth resigned in September 2003 after serving for three years.

=== Leader of the Opposition (2005–2016) ===
Berenger subsequently tried to run on his own but lost the 2005 elections to Ramgoolam's Labour Party.

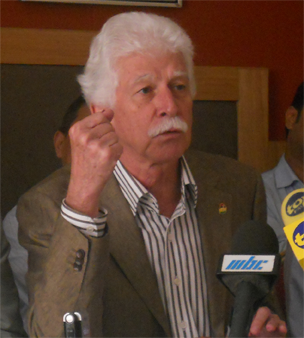
Berenger in 2011

Paul Berenger has been the leader of the opposition since 2007 after the MMM lost the general elections in 2005 to the Alliance Sociale coalition led by Dr Navin Ramgoolam. The MMM also lost the subsequent elections in 2010.

In January 2013, Berenger announced that he had tonsil cancer in a press conference, and let the population know of his plans for treatment in France and that Alan Ganoo was to lead the MMM during his absence. Overall he appeared in good spirits and was confident of a return to mainstream politics. Different sources relayed by the lexpress.mu website also announced the entry into politics of his son, Emmanuel Bérenger. Following his successful treatment for cancer, he returned to his position as Leader of the Opposition on 1 October 2013.

After his party ended its coalition with the Militant Socialist Movement (MSM), Bérenger negotiated an alliance with the Labour Party on a power-sharing deal whereby each party would nominate 30 candidates and, if successful in the election, would provide an equal number of Cabinet Ministers. Navin Ramgoolam would remain prime minister until a new constitution could be adopted to enhance the powers of the President, before resigning to make place for Bérenger to succeed him. This alliance lost the December 2014 elections, however, and Sir Aneerood Jugnauth, who had come out of retirement to lead Alliance Lepep (Alliance of the People) was sworn in prime minister again, at the age of 84.

In October 2019 Berenger went into the general elections with MMM not contracting any alliance with anyone. The MSM of Pravind Jugnauth won an overwhelming victory, although short of a three-quarter majority. Arvind Boolell of the Labour Party was appointed leader of the opposition, as Navin Ramgoolam lost in his constituency. MMM managed to elect only nine MPs. Several petitions were lodged in the Supreme Court challenging the validity of the election results.

=== Deputy Prime Minister (2024–2026) ===
After forging another alliance with the Labour Party and several other parties under the banner of Alliance du Changement, Bérenger became the deputy prime minister for the third time following the landslide victory of the alliance in the 2024 general election. He was offered the post of foreign minister under the new government, however, due to his advanced age, Bérenger declined taking up the post and instead holds the additional role of minister without portfolio in the cabinet. As from 20 March 2026, Paul Bérenger submitted his resignation as Deputy Prime Minister, due to his divergences with the Mauritius Labour Party. On 13 April 2026, he resigned from the MMM along with Joanna Bérenger and Chetan Baboolall created the Fron Militan Progresis.

== Controversies ==
=== Sheik Hossen affair ===
Following the building fire at the head office of newspaper Le Mauricien on 11 June 1978, the MMM's propaganda paper Le Militant published a front-page article in which MMM activist Jean-Paul Sheik Hossen accused several members of the local intelligence police (Special Branch) to have planned the arson attack. Sheik Hossen made allegations against Special Branch's director Fulena, his deputy Sénèque, officers Jean-Paul Venkatachellum and Jean Ramiah. Security guard Yves Bedos supported Sheik Hossen's allegations. The Labour-PMSD-CAM government was alleged to be concerned by Le Mauricien's adoption of the new offset printing technology which would strengthen Bérenger's MMM. Under cover of parliamentary immunity Bérenger further reiterated the accusations against the intelligence police, which led to a lengthy investigation and court appearances. Bérenger eventually has to publicly apologise for having blindly believed in Sheik Hossen's allegations.

=== Microphone snatching incident ===
In 1982, although Anerood Jugnauth was his superior in the hierarchy of the MMM and short-term government, Paul Bérenger snatched the microphone off Jugnauth at a public appearance. This incident infuriated the witnesses from within the party as it confirmed Bérenger's lack of respect for others as well as his unpredictable nature.

=== Illovo Deal for Franco-Mauritian companies ===
The 2001 Illovo Deal, which Bérenger labelled as mari deal (literally meaning "amazing deal") has been criticized to have favoured a small number of elite Franco-Mauritian capitalists, to the detriment of the rest of the Mauritian population, especially the small planters. Bérenger formed part of the government at the time of the Illovo Deal, and his adviser and broker Jean-Mée Desvaux negotiated with Anerood Jugnauth at the latter's office in order for the elite Franco-Mauritian conglomerate to pocket Rs 6 Billion whilst the State would only receive Rs 3 Billion of the deal involving the sale of more than 10,000 arpents of agricultural land. Prior to the Desvaux-Jugnauth meeting the Rs 6 Billion worth of land would have been acquired by the State (to be on sold and distributed to interested small planters).

=== Sexist insults towards women ===
As Leader of the Opposition Paul Bérenger showed disrespect towards women when he publicly insulted Nita Deerpalsing during a session of the National Assembly in August 2008. In response to MP Nita Deerpalsing's expression of support for then Attorney General Rama Valayden Bérenger commented rode ene mari pou li marié do! (meaning "go find her a husband so she can finally get married"). Paul Bérenger's loyal acolyte Rajesh Bhagwan defended Bérenger's insults on the basis that he had been upset by so much support for his opponent Rama Valayden.

=== Insults within the parliament ===
During debates about the need for electoral reforms and the financing of political parties in the National Assembly, Prime Minister Pravind Jugnauth highlighted Bérenger's and the MMM's lack of experience in governing the country and their inability to make legal reforms. Bérenger's acolyte Rajesh Bhagwan also joined in the exchange of verbal insults and Paul Bérenger's old nickname Requin moustache or Rekin Moustass (literally meaning "shark with a moustache") made headlines in the local press.

=== St Louis Gate bribery ===
Following an investigation by financier African Development Bank (ADB), Paul Bérenger was named as one of the recipients of bribes via local company PAD & Co. Ltd. on behalf of Danish firm Burmeister & Wain Scandinavian Contractor (BWSC), which won the contract for the major upgrade of ailing St Louis diesel power station. The scandal became known as St Louis gate.

== Awards and decorations ==
- Mauritius:
  - Grand Commander of the Order of the Star and Key of the Indian Ocean (2003)
