= Rashid Beebeejaun =

Mauritian politician

Ahmed Rashid Beebeejaun GCSK
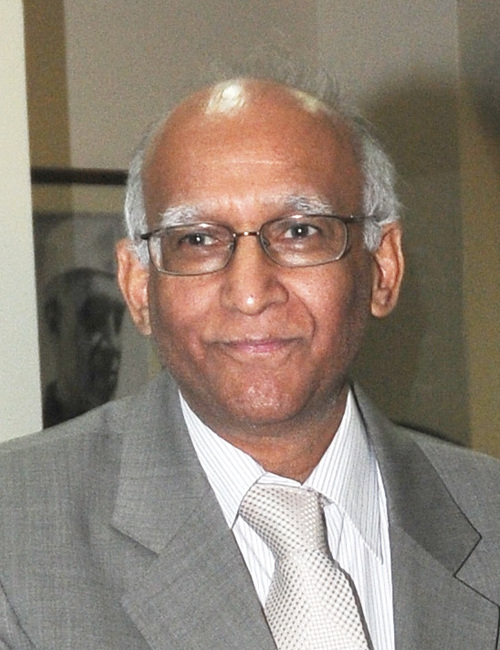
- Beebeejaun in 2010

Deputy Prime Minister of Mauritius
- In office 7 July 2005 – 17 December 2014
- President: Anerood Jugnauth
- Prime Minister: Navin Ramgoolam
- Preceded by: Pravind Jugnauth
- Succeeded by: Xavier-Luc Duval

Minister of Energy and Public Utilities
- In office 3 October 2008 – 17 December 2014
- Prime Minister: Navin Ramgoolam
- Preceded by: Abu Kasenally
- Succeeded by: Ivan Collendavelloo

Personal details
- Born: 22 December 1934 (age 91) Rivière du Rempart, British Mauritius
- Party: Mauritian Labor Party
- Spouse: (Bibi) Khatijan Rawat
- Children: 3, including Saleem
- Profession: Child Health Consultant (1971–1993)

Ahmed Rashid Beebeejaun, GCSK (born 22 December 1934) is a former deputy prime minister and Minister of Energy and Public Utilities of Mauritius. He was the deputy leader of the Mauritian Labor Party and was the first person to hold office of Prime Minister in the Mauritius line of Succession during Navin Ramgoolam's tenure as prime minister.

Navin Ramgoolam appointed Beebeejaun on 7 July 2005 as deputy prime minister after winning the 2005 general elections. He was born in Riviere du Rempart and was a doctor and practitioner in Mauritius before entering politics. In 2007 he was elevated to the rank of Grand Commander of the Star And Key of Indian Ocean by the then President of the country Sir Anerood Jugnauth.

Ahmed Rashid Beebeejaun graduated with a degree in medicine from the University of Birmingham and is a fellow of the Royal College of Physicians.

Beebeejaun was awarded an honorary DUniv by Birmingham University in 2011.
