= Cabinet of Mauritius =

Advisors to the President

The Cabinet of Ministers of the Republic of Mauritius is the official council which advises the President of the Republic in the making of major decisions. It is led by the Prime Minister and a total of 23 ministers and the Attorney General, who is considered to be a cabinet member. The constitution of the Republic provides a cabinet under the leadership of the Prime Minister that must be appointed by the President after each general elections.

A cabinet minister must be a member of parliament whether directly or indirectly elected, with the exception of the Attorney General. The Attorney General, who is part of the cabinet, is appointed at the discretion of the President and on the advice of the Prime Minister.

Every Cabinet Minister taking office must take the oath of swearing allegiance to the President at The State House in front of the President, the first lady, Vice President, Prime Minister and other parliamentarians. Therefore, using the section 59 part 3 of the constitution, the President of the Republic of Mauritius, acting on the advice of the Prime Minister, appoints the person to take office of Minister, taking effect from the swearing of the oath and the signature of the appointment letter.

The last swearing-in ceremony was held on 22 November 2024, where the President appointed a new cabinet composed of the Prime Minister and 24 ministers, including the Attorney General.

== History ==
According to the Constitution of Mauritius, there shall be a Cabinet for Mauritius consisting of the Prime Minister and the other ministers. The functions of the Cabinet shall be to advise the President in the governing of Mauritius and the Cabinet shall be collectively responsible to the National Assembly for any advice given to the President by or under the general authority of the Cabinet and for all things done by or under the authority of any Minister in execution of his office.

Subsection (2) shall not apply in relation to the appointment and removal from office of Ministers and Junior Ministers, the assigning of responsibility to any Minister under section 62, or the authorisation of another Minister to perform the functions of the Prime Minister during absence or illness, the dissolution of Parliament.

There shall be, in addition to the offices of Prime Minister, Deputy Prime Minister and Attorney-General, such other offices of Minister of the Government as may be prescribed by Parliament or, subject to any law, established by the President, acting in accordance with the advice of the Prime Minister.

Provided that the number of offices of Minister, other than the Prime Minister, shall not be more than 24, the President, acting in his own deliberate judgment, shall appoint as Prime Minister the member of the Assembly who appears to him best able to command the support of the majority of the members of the Assembly, and shall, acting in accordance with the advice of the Prime Minister, appoint the Deputy Prime Minister, the Attorney-General and the other Ministers from among the members of the Assembly:

Provided that where occasion arises for making an appointment while Parliament is dissolved, a person who was a member of the Assembly immediately before the dissolution may be appointed; and a person may be appointed Attorney-General, notwithstanding that he is not (or, as the case may be, was not) a member of the Assembly.

== Tenure of office of Ministers ==
Where a resolution of no confidence in the Government is passed by the Assembly and the Prime Minister does not within three days resign from his office, the President shall remove the Prime Minister from office unless, in pursuance of section 57(1), Parliament has been or is to be dissolved in consequence of such resolution.

Where at any time between the holding of a general election and the first sitting of the Assembly thereafter the President, acting in his own deliberate judgment, considers that, in consequence of changes in the membership of the Assembly resulting from that general election, the Prime Minister will not be able to command the support of a majority of the members of the Assembly, the President may remove the Prime Minister from office:

Provided that the President shall not remove the Prime Minister from office within the period of 10 days immediately following the date prescribed for polling at that general election unless he is satisfied that a party or party alliance in opposition to the Government and registered for the purposes of that general election under paragraph 2 of the First Schedule has at that general election gained a majority of all seats in the Assembly.

The office of Prime Minister or any other Minister shall become vacant where he ceases to be a member of the Assembly otherwise than by reason of a dissolution of Parliament or where, at the first sitting of the Assembly after any general election, he is not a member of the Assembly. Provided that it shall not apply to the office of Attorney-General where the holder thereof was not a member of the Assembly on the preceding dissolution of Parliament. The office of a Minister (other than the Prime Minister) shall become vacant where the President, acting in accordance with the advice of the Prime Minister, so directs, where the Prime Minister resigns from office within 3 days after the passage by the Assembly of a resolution of no confidence in the Government or is removed from office under subsection (1) or (2) or upon the appointment of any person to the office of Prime Minister. Where for any period the Prime Minister or any other Minister is unable by reason of section 36(1) to perform his functions as a member of the Assembly, he shall not during that period perform any of his functions as Prime Minister or Minister, as the case may be.

== Cabinet functions ==
Where the Prime Minister is absent from Mauritius or is by reason of illness or of section 60(5) unable to perform the functions conferred on him by this Constitution, the President may, by directions in writing, authorise the Deputy Prime Minister or, in his absence, some other Minister to perform those functions (other than the functions conferred by this section) and that Minister may perform those functions until his authority is revoked by the President. The powers of the President under this section shall be exercised by him in accordance with the advice of the Prime Minister

Provided that where the President, acting in his own deliberate judgment, considers that it is impracticable to obtain the advice of the Prime Minister owing to the Prime Minister's absence or illness, or where the Prime Minister is unable to tender advice by reason of section 60(5), the President may exercise those powers without that advice and in his own deliberate judgment.

== Junior Ministers ==
The President, acting in accordance with the advice of the Prime Minister, may appoint Junior Ministers from among the members of the Assembly to assist Ministers in the performance of their duties. The number of Junior Ministers shall not exceed 10. Where occasion arises for making appointments while the Assembly is dissolved, a person who was a member of the Assembly immediately before the dissolution may be appointed as a Junior Minister. The office of a Junior Minister shall become vacant where the President, acting in accordance with the advice of the Prime Minister, so directs;where the Prime Minister resigns from office within 3 days after the passage by the Assembly of a resolution of no confidence in the Government or is removed from office upon the appointment of a person to the office of Prime Minister. Where for any period a Junior Minister is unable by reason of section 36(1) to perform his functions as a Member of the Assembly, he shall not during that period perform any of his functions as a Junior Minister.

== Swearing allegiance ==
Each Minister, whether Cabinet or Junior Minister, must take the oath and swear their allegiance to the President in according to the section 53(9) of the constitution.

I, (name of the Minister), do solemnly affirm that I will be faithful and bear true allegiance to Mauritius according to law. I, (name of the Minister), being appointed Minister do solemnly affirm that I will do to the best of my judgment at all time when so required freely give my counsel and advice to the President for the good Management of the Public affairs of Mauritius and I do further solemnly affirm that I will not on any account at any time whatsoever disclose the counsel, advice, opinion or vote of any particular minister and that I will not except with the authority of the cabinet and to such extent as may be required for the good management of the Affairs of Mauritius directly or indirectly reveal the business or proceedings of the Minister or any matter coming to my knowledge in my capacity as such and that in all things, I will be a true and faithful minister.

== Allowances and line of succession ==
The cabinet must be composed of 25 sitting members and is led by the Prime Minister. There are two different posts similar to each other are the Deputy Prime Minister and Vice Prime Minister. They are both ministers but the Deputy Prime Minister is the first person to hold office in case of incapacity of the PM and the office of Vice Prime Ministers are also provided but they are given less allowances and benefits.

Office	Annual Allowances	Monthly Allowances	Yearly Expenditures
Prime Minister	Rs 2,520,000; US$58,600	Rs 210,000; US$ 4880	Rs 1,308,000; US $30,400
Deputy Prime Minister	Rs 1,800,000; US $41,800	Rs 150,000; US$3,480	Rs 1,308,000; US $30,400
Vice Prime Minister	Rs 1,740,000; US $40, 400	Rs 145,000; US $3,372	Rs 1,308,000; US $30,400
Minister	Rs 1,740,000; US $40, 400	Rs 145,000; US $3,372	Rs 1,308,000; US $30,400
Junior Minister	Rs 1,200,000; US $27,900	Rs 100,000; US $2,325	
Parliamentary Private Secretary	Rs 1,200,000; US $27,900	Rs 100,000; US $2,325	

== Incumbent cabinet ==
Following the 2024 general election, the new cabinet was sworn in on 22 November 2024 in front of President Prithvirajsing Roopun on the recommendation of the prime minister. The cabinet is composed of 14 ministers of the Parti Travailliste, 8 of the MMM, 1 of the Nouveaux Démocrates (ND), and 1 of Rezistans ek Alternativ (ReA). The nominated Attorney General, Gavin Glover, was appointed on 27 November and took office on 29 November.

=== Ministers ===
Party key	Labour Party
Party key	Mauritian Militant Movement
Party key	New Democrats
Party key	Rezistans ek Alternativ

Portfolio	Portrait	Minister	Term
Prime Minister
Prime Minister		Navin Ramgoolam	12 November 2024 – present
Deputy Prime Minister
Deputy Prime Minister		Arianne Navarre-Marie	4 May 2026 – present
Ministers
Minister of Defence, Home Affairs and External Communications		Navin Ramgoolam	22 November 2024 – present
Minister of Finance		Navin Ramgoolam	22 November 2024 – present
Minister for Rodrigues and Outer Islands		Navin Ramgoolam	22 November 2024 – present
Minister of Housing and Lands		Shakeel Mohamed	22 November 2024 – present
Minister of Environment, Solid Waste Management and Climate Change		Rajesh Bhagwan	22 November 2024 – present
Minister of Agro-Industry, Food Security, Blue Economy and Fisheries		Arvin Boolell	22 November 2024 – present
Minister of National Infrastructure		Ajay Gunness	22 November 2024 – present
Minister of Health and Wellness		Anil Bachoo	22 November 2024 – present
Minister of Tourism		Richard Duval	22 November 2024 – present
Minister of Social Integration, Social Security and National Solidarity		Ashok Subron	22 November 2024 – present
Attorney-General		Gavin Glover	27 November 2024 – present
Minister of Financial Services and Economic Planning		Jyoti Jeetun	22 November 2024 – present
Minister of Energy and Public Utilities		Patrick Assirvaden	22 November 2024 – present
Minister of Foreign Affairs, Regional Integration and International Trade		Ritish Ramful	22 November 2024 – present
Minister of Youth and Sports		Deven Nagalingum	22 November 2024 – present
Minister of Labour and Industrial Relations		Reza Uteem	22 November 2024 – present
Minister of Land Transport		Osman Mahomed	22 November 2024 – present
Minister of Gender Equality and Family Welfare		Arianne Navarre-Marie	22 November 2024 – present
Minister of Commerce and Consumer Protection		Michael Sik Yuen	22 November 2024 – present
Minister of Tertiary Education, Science and Research		Kaviraj Sukon	22 November 2024 – present
Minister of Industry, SMEs and Cooperatives		Aadil Ameer Meea	22 November 2024 – present
Minister of Education and Human Resource		Mahend Gungapersad	22 November 2024 – present
Minister of Information Technology, Communication and Innovation		Avinash Ramtohul	22 November 2024 – present
Minister of Public Service and Administrative Reforms		Raj Pentiah	22 November 2024 – present
Minister of Local Government		Ranjiv Woochit	22 November 2024 – present
Minister of Arts and Culture		Mahendra Gondeea	22 November 2024 – present

=== Junior ministers ===
Party key	Labour Party
Party key	Mauritian Militant Movement
Party key	New Democrats
Party key	Rezistans ek Alternativ

Ministry	Portrait	Junior minister	Term
Finance		Dhaneshwar Damry	22 November 2024 – present
Agro-Industry, Food Security, Blue Economy and Fisheries		Fabrice David	22 November 2024 – present
Youth and Sports		Karen Foo Kune	22 November 2024 – present
Tourism		Sydney Pierre	22 November 2024 – 1 August 2026
Local Government		Fawzi Allymun	22 November 2024 – present
Health and Wellness		Anishta Babooram	7 August 2025 – present
Foreign Affairs, Regional Integration and International Trade		Rajen Narsinghen	22 November 2024 – present
Social Integration, Social Security and National Solidarity		Kugan Parapen	22 November 2024 – present
Arts and Culture		Véronique Leu-Govind	22 November 2024 – present
