= Fourth Navin Ramgoolam cabinet =

Current cabinet of Mauritius

- 17th Cabinet of Mauritius

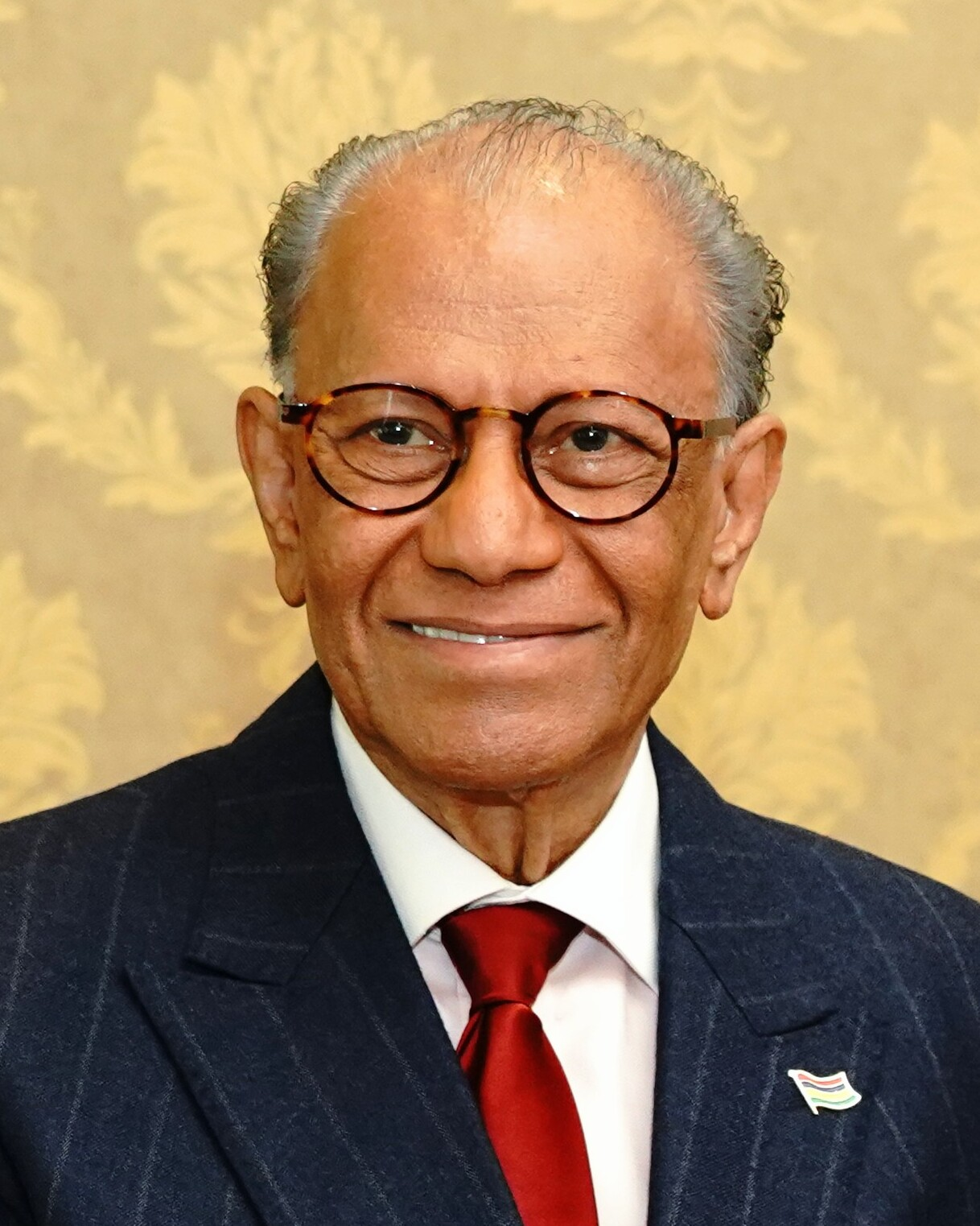
- Date established: 12 November 2024

Leadership and composition
- President: Prithvirajsing Roopun; Dharam Gokhool
- Prime Minister: Navin Ramgoolam
- Deputy: Paul Bérenger (2024–26); Arianne Navarre-Marie (2026–)
- Member party: PTr; MMM; ND; ReA; OPR; AL
- Status in legislature: Supermajority coalition
- Opposition party: MSM; PMSD
- Opposition leader: Joe Lesjongard (2024–26); Chetan Baboolall (2026–)

Formation and history
- Election: 2024
- Legislature term: 8th National Assembly
- Predecessor: P. Jugnauth II

The Fourth Navin Ramgoolam cabinet is the incumbent cabinet of Mauritius, headed by Prime Minister Navin Ramgoolam. It was formed in November 2024 after the 2024 Mauritian general election.

Ramgoolam's electoral alliance of Alliance du Changement, composed of the Labour Party, Mauritian Militant Movement, New Democrats and Rezistans ek Alternativ, won the election by a landslide, taking all the elected seats in the National Assembly. He was appointed as prime minister on 12 November and sworn in on 13 November 2024 by President Prithvirajsing Roopun. His cabinet was fully sworn in and appointed on 22 November 2024.

Both parties representing Rodrigues, Rodrigues People's Organisation and Alliance Liberation, declared their support for the government and joined the majority bloc in the National Assembly. However, both parties are not represented with any ministers or junior ministers.

== History ==
=== Formation ===
Following Ramgoolam's victory in the 2024 election, incumbent prime minister Pravind Jugnauth submitted his resignation to the President, Prithvirajsing Roopun, at 18:15, 12 November 2024. Afterwards, Roopun appointed Ramgoolam as prime minister on the same day and was sworn in the following day at the State House.

The division of portfolios were divided by each party under the winning alliance. Out of the 24 ministers appointed, the Labour Party had 14, the Mauritian Militant Movement with 8 and both New Democrats and Rezistans ek Alternativ with 1. In addition, Gavin Glover, having been recommended by the Labour Party, became the new Attorney-General, effectively giving Labour 15 ministers in total. 14 of the ministers are new and 10 of them having previous ministerial experience. Only two ministers are female: Arianne Navarre-Marie, who became Minister of Gender Equality and Family Welfare, and Jyoti Jeetun, as Minister of Financial Services and Economic Planning. Both ministers are from the Mauritian Militant Movement.

Ramgoolam maintained for himself the ministerial posts falling under the prime minister's office whilst also keeping the role of finance minister. Paul Bérenger received the post of Deputy Prime Minister, with the post of Vice-Prime Minister being discontinued under the new government. He, however, did not take up any of the ministerial portfolios available and instead took the additional title of minister without portfolio. Shakeel Mohamed was designated as the third-highest-ranking member of the cabinet, becoming housing minister, whilst Rajesh Bhagwan becomes the fourth-ranking member, taking over the environment ministry.

In addition to the new cabinet was the reintroduction of the role of Junior Ministers, replacing the role of Parliamentary Private Secretaries under the previous government. Ramgoolam had previously used this office before in his previous premierships. A maximum of 10 junior ministers were appointed, with Labour having 5, the MMM with 3 and ND and ReA with 1 each.

The two Rodriguan parties represented in the National Assembly, Rodrigues People's Organisation and Alliance Liberation, declared their support to the incoming government and intended to join the majority. The latter party declared their support for the government on 14 November. Chief Commissioner of Rodrigues Franceau Grandcourt asked Ramgoolam to join the government, given the fact that it would facilitate and allow consistency in terms of coordination between the regional government in Rodrigues and the National Assembly. Francisco François, leader of the OPR, wished to cooperate and integrate its programme along with the priorities of the Alliance du Changement. Eventually, both parties became part of the government and sits with the majority in the Assembly. This left only two opposition MPs, one each from the Militant Socialist Movement and Parti Mauricien Social Démocrate. It is the lowest representation of opposition MPs in Mauritian history.

The new government was fully sworn in on 22 November 2024 at the State House, with the exception of Gavin Glover, who was appointed on 27 November and eventually sworn in on 29 November due to prior commitments. Shakeel Mohamed was appointed as Attorney-General for the time being by the President on 26 November.

== Supporting parties ==
Name		Leader	Ministers		Junior ministers	
Name		Leader	2024	2026	2024	2026
Government parties
PTr	Labour Party; Parti Travailliste	Navin Ramgoolam	15 / 25	15 / 24	5 / 10	4 / 8
MMM	Mauritian Militant Movement; Mouvement Militant Mauricien	Vacant	8 / 25	7 / 24	3 / 10	2 / 8
ND	New Democrats; Nouveaux Démocrates	Khushal Lobine	1 / 25	1 / 24	1 / 10	1 / 8
ReA	Rezistans ek Alternativ	Ashok Subron	1 / 25	1 / 24	1 / 10	1 / 8
OPR	Rodrigues People's Organisation; Organisation du Peuple Rodriguais	Francisco François	Unrepresented			
AL	Alliance Liberation	Dianette Henriette-Manan	Unrepresented			

== Ministers ==
Party key	Labour Party
Party key	Mauritian Militant Movement
Party key	New Democrats
Party key	Rezistans ek Alternativ

Portfolio	Portrait	Minister	Term
Prime Minister
Prime Minister		Navin Ramgoolam	12 November 2024 – present
Deputy Prime Minister
Deputy Prime Minister		Paul Bérenger	22 November 2024 – 20 March 2026
Deputy Prime Minister		Arianne Navarre-Marie	4 May 2026 – present
Ministers
Minister of Defence, Home Affairs and External Communications		Navin Ramgoolam	22 November 2024 – present
Minister of Finance		Navin Ramgoolam	22 November 2024 – present
Minister for Rodrigues and Outer Islands		Navin Ramgoolam	22 November 2024 – present
Minister without portfolio		Paul Bérenger	22 November 2024 – 20 March 2026
Minister of Gender Equality and Family Welfare		Arianne Navarre-Marie	22 November 2024 – present
Minister of Housing and Lands		Shakeel Mohamed	22 November 2024 – present
Minister of Environment, Solid Waste Management and Climate Change		Rajesh Bhagwan	22 November 2024 – present
Minister of Agro-Industry, Food Security, Blue Economy and Fisheries		Arvin Boolell	22 November 2024 – present
Minister of National Infrastructure		Ajay Gunness	22 November 2024 – present
Minister of Health and Wellness		Anil Bachoo	22 November 2024 – present
Minister of Tourism		Richard Duval	22 November 2024 – present
Minister of Social Integration, Social Security and National Solidarity		Ashok Subron	22 November 2024 – present
Attorney-General		Shakeel Mohamed	26 November 2024 – 27 November 2024
Attorney-General		Gavin Glover	27 November 2024 – present
Minister of Financial Services and Economic Planning		Jyoti Jeetun	22 November 2024 – present
Minister of Energy and Public Utilities		Patrick Assirvaden	22 November 2024 – present
Minister of Foreign Affairs, Regional Integration and International Trade		Ritish Ramful	22 November 2024 – present
Minister of Youth and Sports		Deven Nagalingum	22 November 2024 – present
Minister of Labour and Industrial Relations		Reza Uteem	22 November 2024 – present
Minister of Land Transport		Osman Mahomed	22 November 2024 – present
Minister of Commerce and Consumer Protection		Michael Sik Yuen	22 November 2024 – present
Minister of Tertiary Education, Science and Research		Kaviraj Sukon	22 November 2024 – present
Minister of Industry, SMEs and Cooperatives		Aadil Ameer Meea	22 November 2024 – present
Minister of Education and Human Resource		Mahend Gungapersad	22 November 2024 – present
Minister of Information Technology, Communication and Innovation		Avinash Ramtohul	22 November 2024 – present
Minister of Public Service and Administrative Reforms		Raj Pentiah	22 November 2024 – present
Minister of Local Government		Ranjiv Woochit	22 November 2024 – present
Minister of Arts and Culture		Mahendra Gondeea	22 November 2024 – present

=== Changes ===
- 20 March 2026 – Paul Bérenger resigned from his post as deputy prime minister, following his discontent with the progress of the government's agenda and insistence for a full-time finance minister.
- 4 May 2026 – Arianne Navarre-Marie was appointed as deputy prime minister to replace Paul Bérenger, with immediate effect.

== Junior ministers ==
Party key	Labour Party
Party key	Mauritian Militant Movement
Party key	New Democrats
Party key	Rezistans ek Alternativ

Ministry	Portrait	Junior minister	Term
Finance		Dhaneshwar Damry	22 November 2024 – present
Environment, Solid Waste Management and Climate Change		Joanna Bérenger	22 November 2024 – 23 March 2026
Agro-Industry, Food Security, Blue Economy and Fisheries		Fabrice David	22 November 2024 – present
Youth and Sports		Karen Foo Kune	22 November 2024 – present
Tourism		Sydney Pierre	22 November 2024 – 31 July 2026
Local Government		Fawzi Allymun	22 November 2024 – present
Gender Equality and Family Welfare		Anishta Babooram	22 November 2024 – 7 August 2025
Health and Wellness		Anishta Babooram	7 August 2025 – present
Foreign Affairs, Regional Integration and International Trade		Rajen Narsinghen	22 November 2024 – present
Social Integration, Social Security and National Solidarity		Kugan Parapen	22 November 2024 – present
Arts and Culture		Véronique Leu-Govind	22 November 2024 – present

=== Changes ===
- 7 August 2025 – Anishta Babooram was transferred as junior minister from the Ministry of Gender Equality and Family Welfare to the Ministry of Health and Wellness, following conflicts with the senior minister Arianne Navarre-Marie.
- 23 March 2026 – Joanna Bérenger resigned as Junior Minister from the Minister of Environment, Solid Waste Management and Climate Change following her father's and Chetan Baboolall's decision to leave the government.
- 31 July 2026 - Sydney Pierre was dismissed as Junior Minister from the Ministry of Tourism after he voted against during the committee stage amendments to the National Pensions Act under the Finance Bill of 2026. Pierre was the only member of the governing majority to vote against the amendment.
