= Ministry of Tourism (Mauritius) =

Government ministry of Mauritius

- Ministère de Tourisme

Agency overview
- Formed: 1968
- Jurisdiction: Government of Mauritius
- Headquarters: Air Mauritius Centre, John Kennedy Street, Port Louis
- Ministers responsible: Richard Duval, Minister; Sydney Pierre, Junior Minister
- Agency executive: Indira Rugjee, Permanent Secretary
- Website: tourism.govmu.org

The Ministry of Tourism is a ministry in the government of Mauritius responsible for planning and adopting policies and legislation in relation to tourism within Mauritius. The ministry, which oversees an integral part of the Mauritian economy, also ensures and implements standards within the tourism sector with focus on sustainable development.

The tourism portfolio has existed since 1968 under the foreign ministry as External Affairs, Tourism and Emigration. However, it was not until 1991 that the tourism portfolio was given its own separate ministry, independent from others, which continues to this day. Richard Duval is the incumbent minister of tourism, having been appointed on 22 November 2024. The junior minister, Sydney Pierre, was also appointed on the same day with responsibility to assist the minister.

== Organization ==
The political head of the Ministry is the Minister for Tourism. Senior staff include the Permanent Secretary and other members of the Administration Section. The work of the Ministry is divided between the Technical Unit, which covers policy and planning, and the Leisure Unit, which promotes leisure activities for citizens and tourists.

Other public bodies also operate under the aegis of the Ministry: the Tourism Authority, which regulates the tourist industry, the Mauritius Tourism Promotion Authority, which promotes Mauritius as a tourist destination, and the Tourism Employees Welfare Fund.

== Policy ==
According to the Ministry, "[T]he National Tourism Policy emphasizes low impact, high spending tourism", and sees Mauritius as a high-end tourist destination. The government's National Long-Term Perspective Study, published in 1997, noted the growth in tourist arrivals and proposed a "green ceiling" on the number of tourists to prevent overdevelopment of the island's environment, with increased revenue coming from higher spending per tourist. Tourist arrivals have grown from 422,463 in 1995 to a forecasted 1,030,000 for 2014. The continued growth in tourist arrivals has been criticized by We Love Mauritius, an environmental non-governmental organization.

In 1997, there were 87 hotels with a total capacity of 6,800 rooms and 14,100 bedplaces. Average room occupancy rates were 72% for all hotels and 78% for large hotels (defined as established beach hotels with more than 80 rooms). Figures for bed occupancy rates were 64% and 70% respectively. Several beachside resort hotels are owned and/or operated by large groups such as Sun International and Beachcomber Hotels. It is estimated that around 25% of visitors stay in non-hotel accommodation, such as boarding houses, self-catering bungalows and with friends and relatives.

The Ministry's Strategic Direction for 2013 to 2015 states that it seeks continued growth of at least 5% annually in the tourism sector, and addresses declining demand from traditional markets such as Europe by seeking customers from other regions such as China, India, and Russia. Mauritius also participates with other island nations in the Indian Ocean in the Vanilla Islands scheme to promote themselves collectively as a tourist destination.

== List of ministers ==
Portrait	Name	Term of office			Portfolio name	Party	Prime minister	Ref.
Portrait	Name	Took office	Left office	Time in office	Portfolio name	Party	Prime minister	Ref.
Portfolio previously combined under the Ministry of External Affairs, Tourism and Emigration
	Sir Gaëtan Duval	14 January 1986	12 August 1988	2 years, 211 days	Employment and Tourism	PMSD	A. Jugnauth	
	Michael Glover	15 August 1988	27 September 1991	3 years, 43 days	Youth, Sports and Tourism	MSM	A. Jugnauth	
	Noël Lee Cheong Lem	27 September 1991	13 February 1995	3 years, 139 days	Tourism	MMM	A. Jugnauth	
	Noël Lee Cheong Lem	27 September 1991	13 February 1995	3 years, 139 days	Tourism	RMM	A. Jugnauth	
	Xavier-Luc Duval	13 February 1995	10 November 1995	270 days	Tourism	PMSD	A. Jugnauth	
	José Arunasalom	30 December 1995	21 June 1997	1 year, 173 days	Tourism	MMM	N. Ramgoolam	
	Jacques Chasteau de Balyon	2 July 1997	15 September 2000	3 years, 75 days	Tourism and Leisure	PTr	N. Ramgoolam	
	Nando Bodha	17 September 2000	23 December 2003	3 years, 97 days	Tourism and Leisure	MSM	A. Jugnauth	
	Nando Bodha	17 September 2000	23 December 2003	3 years, 97 days	Tourism and Leisure	MSM	Bérenger	
	Anil Gayan	23 December 2003	5 July 2005	1 year, 194 days	Tourism and Leisure	MSM	Bérenger	
	Xavier-Luc Duval	7 July 2005	11 May 2010	4 years, 308 days	Tourism, Leisure and External Communications	PMSD	N. Ramgoolam	
	Nando Bodha	11 May 2010	26 July 2011	1 year, 76 days	Tourism and Leisure	MSM	N. Ramgoolam	
	Arvin Boolell; Acting	26 July 2011	7 August 2011	12 days	Tourism and Leisure	PTr	N. Ramgoolam	
	Michael Sik Yuen	7 August 2011	13 December 2014	2 years, 128 days	Tourism and Leisure	PTr	N. Ramgoolam	
	Xavier-Luc Duval	15 December 2014	19 December 2016	2 years, 4 days	Tourism and External Communications	PMSD	A. Jugnauth	
	Ivan Collendavelloo	20 December 2016	23 January 2017	34 days	Tourism	ML	A. Jugnauth	
	Anil Gayan	23 January 2017	12 November 2019	2 years, 304 days	Tourism	ML	P. Jugnauth	
	Joe Lesjongard	12 November 2019	25 June 2020	226 days	Tourism	MSM	P. Jugnauth	
	Steven Obeegadoo	25 June 2020	12 November 2024	4 years, 140 days	Tourism	PM	P. Jugnauth	
	Richard Duval	22 November 2024	Incumbent	1 year, 260 days	Tourism	ND	N. Ramgoolam	

== See also ==
- Tourism in Mauritius
