= Government of Mauritius =

National government

The Government of Mauritius (French: Gouvernement de Maurice) is the main authority of the executive power in the Republic of Mauritius. The head of the Government is the Prime Minister of Mauritius, who manages the main agenda of the Government and direct the ministers.

The 2023 Ibrahim Index of African Governance ranked Mauritius second in good governance. According to the 2023 Democracy Index compiled by the Economist Intelligence Unit that measures the state of democracy in 167 countries, Mauritius ranks 20th worldwide followed by Uruguay and United States and is the only African country with "Full Democracy".

== Familial Involvement ==
Since the first democratic elections in 1948, the field of politics in Mauritius has been marked by a handful of families who have controlled the four major political parties which exist to this day. They are often referred to as the "modern dynasties" of Mauritian politics, such as the Duval, Bérenger, Gunowa (Gungah), Curé, Uteem, Mohamed, Boolell, Ramgoolam and Jugnauth families.

== Legislature ==
The National Assembly is the legislative branch of the government of Mauritius. The Assembly is made up of 70 Members elected in 21 constituencies, of which Rodrigues Island is one.

== Cabinet ==
Portfolio	Minister	Political party	Term
1. Prime Minister; Minister of Defence, Home Affairs and External Communications; Minister of Finance; Minister for Rodrigues, Outer Islands and Territorial Integrity	Navin Ramgoolam	Ptr	2024-
2. Deputy Prime Minister	Paul Bérenger	MMM	2024-
3. Minister of Housing and Lands	Shakeel Mohamed	Ptr	2024-
4. Minister of Environment, Solid Waste Management and Climate Change	Rajesh Bhagwan	MMM	2024-
5. Minister of Agro-Industry, Food Security, Blue Economy and Fisheries	Arvin Boolell	Ptr	2024-
6. Minister of National Infrastructure	Ajay Gunness	MMM	2024-
7. Minister of Health and Wellness	Anil Bachoo	Ptr	2024-
8. Minister of Tourism	Richard Duval	ND	2024-
9. Minister of Social Integration, Social Security and National Solidarity	Ashok Subron	ReA	2024-
10. Attorney General	Gavin Glover		2024-
11. Minister of Financial Services and Economic Planning	Jyoti Jeetun	MMM	2024-
12. Minister of Energy and Public Utilities	Patrick Assirvaden	Ptr	2024-
13. Minister of Foreign Affairs, Regional Integration and International Trade	Ritish Ramful	Ptr	2024-
14. Minister of Youth and Sports	Deven Nagalingum	MMM	2024-
15. Minister of Labour and Industrial Relations	Reza Uteem	MMM	2024-
16. Minister of Land Transport	Osman Mahomed	Ptr	2024-
17. Minister of Gender Equality and Family Welfare	Arianne Navarre-Marie	MMM	2024-
18. Minister of Commerce and Consumer Protection	Michael Sik Yuen	Ptr	2024-
19. Minister of Tertiary Education, Science and Research	Kaviraj Sukon	Ptr	2024-
20. Minister of Industry, SME and Cooperatives	Aadil Ameer Meea	MMM	2024-
21. Minister of Education and Human Resource	Mahend Gungapersad	Ptr	2024-
22. Minister of Information Technology, Communication and Innovation	Avinash Ramtohul	Ptr	2024-
23. Minister of Public Service and Administrative Reforms	Raj Pentiah	Ptr	2024-
24. Minister of Local Government	Ranjiv Woochit	Ptr	2024-
25. Minister of Arts and Culture	Mahendra Gondeea	Ptr	2024-

== Judiciary branch ==
Mauritius' Courts include the Supreme Court, the Court of Rodrigues, the Intermediate Court, the Industrial Court, the District Courts, the Bail and Remand Court, the Criminal and Mediation Court and the Commercial Court and the Children's Court. The Chief Justice is head of the judiciary.

== Local governments ==
Each city, town, village and district of Mauritius are administered, for the purposes of local government, by the local authorities; the municipal city councils, municipal councils, the district councils and the village councils.

== See also ==
- Politics of Mauritius
- Government Portal of Mauritius
