= Véronique Leu-Govind =

Mauritian politician

Junior Minister of Arts and Culture
- In office 22 November 2024 – 3 August 2026

Personal details
- Party: New Democrats

Marie Véronique Leu-Govind is a Mauritian politician from the New Democrats (ND). She served as Junior Minister of Arts and Culture in the fourth Navin Ramgoolam cabinet from November 2024 until her resignation in August 2026, following a drug-trafficking scandal during which her husband was arrested.

== Political career ==
In December 2014, with the support of councillor Emmanuel Reine de Carthage, 30-year-old social worker Véronique Leu-Govind was elected as President of the Black River District Council as a member of the PMSD. She replaced Noel Chetty and was grateful to Hervé Aimée and Maya Hanoomanjee for this appointment. She was again voted back into the same office at the December 2016 elections but in October 2017 she was replaced by Steeve Magdaleine after a vote of no confidence authored by Kemraj Ortoo of the MMM.

On 1 May 2018, soon after being voted out of the Black River District Council, she was nominated as President of the PMSD by the party's leader Xavier-Luc Duval.

On 5 June 2020 she was elected back as President of the Black River District Council after defeating her opponent Veenabye Jeewajee.

In April 2024 Véronique Leu-Govind followed Khushal Lobine and Richard Duval as they resigned from the PMSD to join the PTr-MMM coalition. On 13 September 2024, she was appointed President of the New Democrats.

== Reunion Island drug trafficking scandal ==
On 31 July 2026 Yogajee Govind, also known as Gulshan Govind, the 42-year old husband of Véronique Leu-Govind, was arrested by the Anti Drug and Smuggling Unit (ADSU) of the Western Division of the Mauritius Police Force for his involvement, with suspect Ravindra Chimajee, in a drug trafficking network after 155.7 kilograms of cannabis (worth Rs 233.55 million) were seized by law enforcement authorities of Reunion Island. When the couple's house at Case Noyale was searched by police, they discovered 4 marijuana plants growing on the roof, as well as an amount of synthetic opioid drug methadone. They also seized the couple's SUV, a GWM Tank worth Rs 2.8 million. Gulshan Govind's history in drug trafficking was also brought to light, given that he was convicted and jailed for 1 year in 2008 for trafficking marijuana. The scandal also cast light over Benjamin Leu, Véronique Leu-Govind's brother, who spent 2.5 years in jail in Reunion Island after being found guilty of cannabis drug trafficking in 2023. The Financial Crimes Commission (FCC) also started to investigate the family's involvement in money laundering. On 4 August 2026 in the National Assembly Joe Lesjongard, the Leader of the Opposition, questioned Prime Minister Navin Ramgoolam about the unusually high number of trips made by Véronique Leu-Govind with her drug trafficker husband to Reunion Island since 2025, and their access to the airport's VIP Lounge. However, Navin Ramgoolam replied that the couple's access to the VIP Lounge as "absolutely normal".
