= Jyoti Jeetun =

Mauritian politician

The Honourable Jyoti Jeetun
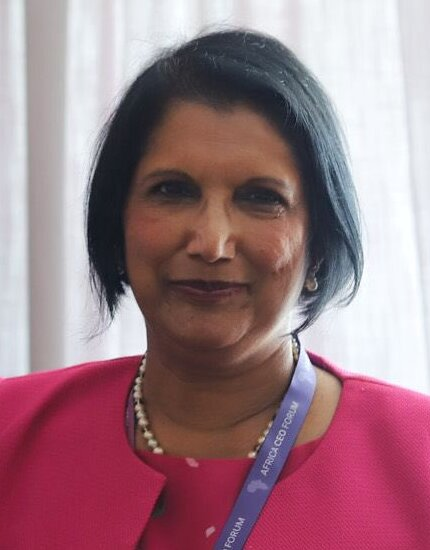

Minister of Financial Services and Economic Planning
- Incumbent
- Assumed office 22 November 2024
- Prime Minister: Navin Ramgoolam
- Preceded by: Sunil Bholah

Member of Parliament; for Vacoas and Floréal
- Incumbent
- Assumed office 12 November 2024
- Preceded by: Nando Bodha

Personal details
- Born: 1958 (age 67–68) Triolet, Mauritius
- Party: Mauritian Militant Movement
- Education: University of Warwick

Jyoti Jeetun (born 1958) is a Mauritian businesswoman and politician. A member of the Mauritian Militant Movement, Jeetun currently serves as Minister of Financial Services and Economic Planning since November 2024 under Navin Ramgoolam's government. She was first elected to the National Assembly of Mauritius after the 2024 general election.

== Early life, education and career ==
Jyoti Jeetun was born in a Bhojpuri-speaking Hindu family of nine children in the village of Triolet, Mauritius which is located in the Pamplemousses District in the north of Mauritius. Jeetun's father was a bus driver and her mother (born in 1933) worked as a labourer. For her secondary education she attended Bhujoharry College, located at Rue St Georges in Port Louis. She started her career as Clerical Officer at the Civil Status Office and in 1982 she married school teacher Daya Jeetun who lived in the village of Laventure, after which she gave birth to two children Pooja and Rahul.

In 1992 Lindsay Rivière, journalist and head of publishing house Southern Cross who had returned from a decade spent in Australia, recruited her as financial journalist for Business Magazine. Her work on the Business Year Book and Top 100 Companies changed here view of the business world that she wrote to Financial Times of London to ask for an internship. Her request was successful and she worked there for three months.

On 21 November 1994 she was recruited as Company Secretary of the Sugar Investment Trust (SIT) and was promoted to the position of chief executive officer (CEO) on 27 July 2000. From 2000 to 2005 she oversaw the growth of the number of shareholders in SIT from a handful to around 55,000, mainly consisting of small planters and employees of the sugar industry. Over the same time period she was founding chairman of the New Cooperative Bank which later became the Mauritius Post & Cooperative Bank, and subsequently Maubank. However, on 19 August 2005 she was sacked without reason and without notice, soon after the Navin Ramgoolam was elected on 5 July 2005 as Prime Minister of the new Alliance Sociale government made up of 5 different parties (Labour-PMXD–VF–MR–MMSM). Jeetun only received 3 months of salary in lieu of notice. Leading to this event the board of the SIT had been under repeated pressure by the new government to sack Jeetun without any due cause via Krishnawtee Beegun, a senior government official from the Ministry of Agro-Industry who also represented the ministry on the board of directors. On 27 September 2005 she sued the SIT in the Industrial Court to claim a severance allowance. On 30 May 2007 the presiding magistrate rejected her claim and after appealing the verdict in the Supreme Court, the SIT was ordered to pay Rs 8 Millions and costs to Jeetun. On 21 April 2010 the chief judge allowed the SIT to appeal in front of a Judicial Committee. Eventually Jyoti Jeetun won her case at the Privy Council (United Kingdom).

In January 2006 Jeetun's husband resigned from Curepipe College and the whole family left Mauritius to settle in London. She worked at BNP Parisbas, Barclays Capital, Bank of America Merrill Lynch. Later she lectured at Warwick Business School, Oxford Brookes University Business School, Birmingham Business School and Essex. Jeetun also founded Arte Fine Arts, a start-up to promote artforms from Mauritius and the Indian Ocean.

In a published interview a few months before the 10 December 2014 General Elections Jeetun spoke about her exile in England after being forced out of the SIT by the government led by Navin Ramgoolam and revealed that she had intentions to return to her native Mauritius. But it was on 1 April 2016 that Jeetun returned to Mauritius, after being offered a managerial position by Vincent Rogers to work for Groupe Mont Choisy. Her main goal as the new CEO was to develop 1500 arpents of agricultural land into a clubhouse, IRS villas, an international golf course, smart city and other infrastructure. In August 2024 Vincent Hardy was nominated as her successor as group chief executive officer (CEO) of Groupe Mont Choisy after Jeetun's resignation in July 2024 to join the MMM's campaign for the 2024 General Elections.

== Political career ==
At the 10 November 2024 general elections, Jeetun received the investiture of Alliance du Changement in Constituency No.16 - Vacoas and Floreal. She was elected in second place after Joanna Bérenger with about 67.1% of votes. Her main rivals from Alliance Lepep were Dinish Deenoo, Asant Govind and Alexandre Le Blanc, but they only secured 24.8%, 21.1% and 20.6% of the votes respectively. Jeetun took an oath as Minister of Financial Services and Economic Planning at the State House on 22 November 2024.
