= Govindachandra =

Govindachandra may refer to:

- Govindachandra (Chandra dynasty), Indian king
- Govindachandra (Gahadavala dynasty), Indian king
- Govinda Chandra Dev, Bangladeshi academic
- Govind Chandra Pande, Indian historian
- Gobinda Chandra Naskar, Indian politician
- Govind Chandra Munda, Indian politician

== See also ==
- Govinda (disambiguation)
- Chandra (disambiguation)
