= Avinash =

Avinash may refer to:

== Arts and entertainment ==
- Avinash (film), a 1986 Indian Hindi-language film
- Tiger (YRF Spy Universe) (Avinash Singh Rathore), fictional agent in the Tiger franchise of the YRF Spy Universe

== People ==
- Avinash Ramtohul, Mauritian politician
- Avinash Sachdev (born 1986), Indian actor
- Avinash Singh (born 1989), Trinidad and Tobago politician
- Avinash Tiwary (born 1991), Indian actor
- Avinash Yelandur (born 1959), Indian actor
