= Ministry of Rodrigues and Outer Islands =

Government ministry of Mauritius

- Ministère de Rodrigues et des Îles éparses

Agency overview
- Formed: 1976
- Jurisdiction: Government of Mauritius
- Headquarters: New Government Centre, Port Louis
- Minister responsible: Navin Ramgoolam, Minister for Rodrigues and Outer Islands
- Website: mroiti.govmu.org

The Ministry of Rodrigues and Outer Islands is a ministry in the government of Mauritius responsible for the affairs of Rodrigues, an autonomous part of Mauritius, and the Outer Islands. The administration of maritime zones and territorial integrity is also under the purview of the ministry.

Traditionally held by the prime minister since Rodrigues gained autonomy, the current minister responsible is incumbent prime minister Navin Ramgoolam, who has served since November 2024 under his fourth government.

== History ==
The ministry of Rodrigues was established in 1976 under Sir Seewoosagur Ramgoolam's government. Nicol François, an MP from the Parti Mauricien Social Démocrate and who also represented the constituency of Rodrigues, became the first minister under the new portfolio.

The Outer Islands division of the ministry was established under Sir Anerood Jugnauth's government in the 1980s and since then, both the Rodrigues and Outer Islands divisions have been either combined or separated in the succeeding governments.

== Organisation ==
=== Departments ===
The ministry is divided between the following departments:

- Rodrigues
- Department for Continental Shelf, Maritime Zones Administration and Exploration
- Forensic Science Laboratory
- Prisons and Correctional Institutions
- Rehabilitation Youth Centre
- Probation and Aftercare Service
- High Level Committee for the Elimination of Gender Based Violence
- High Level Drugs and HIV Council

=== Statutory boards ===
Two statutory boards are under the responsibility of the ministry:

- Outer Islands Development Corporation
- Chagossian Welfare Fund

== List of ministers ==
=== Ministers for Rodrigues ===
Portrait	Name	Term of office		Portfolio name	Party	Prime minister	Ref.
Portrait	Name	Took office	Left office	Portfolio name	Party	Prime minister	Ref.
	Nicol François	27 December 1976	February; 1981	Rodrigues	PMSD	S. Ramgoolam	
	Angidi Chettiar	February; 1981	15 June 1982	Rodrigues	PTr	S. Ramgoolam	
	Serge Clair	15 June 1982	27 August 1983	Rodrigues and the Outer Islands	OPR	A. Jugnauth	
	France Félicité	27 August 1983	4 September 1987	Rodrigues and the Outer Islands	OPR	A. Jugnauth	
	France Félicité	13 January 1986	4 September 1987	Rodrigues	OPR	A. Jugnauth	
	Serge Clair	4 September 1987	14 November 1995	Rodrigues	OPR	A. Jugnauth	
	Navin Ramgoolam	30 December 1995	30 November 1996	Civil Service Affairs and for Rodrigues and the Outer Islands	PTr	N. Ramgoolam	
	Navin Ramgoolam	30 November 1996	2 July 1997	Rodrigues and the Outer Islands	PTr	N. Ramgoolam	
	BenoÎt Jolicoeur	2 July 1997	15 September 2000	Rodrigues	OPR	N. Ramgoolam	
	Joe Lesjongard	18 September 2000	23 December 2003	Local Government, Rodrigues and Urban and Rural Development	MSM	A. Jugnauth	
	Joe Lesjongard	18 September 2000	23 December 2003	Local Government and Rodrigues	MSM	A. Jugnauth	
	Joe Lesjongard	18 September 2000	23 December 2003	Local Government and Rodrigues	MSM	Bérenger	
	Prithviraj Putten	23 December 2003	30 April 2004	Local Government and Rodrigues	MSM	Bérenger	
	Prithviraj Putten	30 April 2004	5 July 2005	Shipping, Rodrigues and Outer Islands	MSM	Bérenger	
	Navin Ramgoolam	7 July 2005	13 September 2008	Rodrigues and the Outer Islands	PTr	N. Ramgoolam	
	James Burty David	13 September 2008	13 December 2009	Local Government, Rodrigues and Outer Islands	PTr	N. Ramgoolam	
	Hervé Aimée	21 January 2008	11 May 2010	Local Government, Rodrigues and Outer Islands	PTr	N. Ramgoolam	
	Nicolas Von Mally	11 May 2010	10 February 2012	Fisheries and Rodrigues	MR	N. Ramgoolam	
	Navin Ramgoolam	10 February 2012	13 December 2014	Rodrigues	PTr	N. Ramgoolam	
	Sir Anerood Jugnauth	15 December 2014	23 January 2017	Rodrigues and National Development Unit	MSM	A. Jugnauth	
	Sir Anerood Jugnauth	23 January 2017	12 November 2019	Rodrigues	MSM	P. Jugnauth	
	Pravind Jugnauth	12 November 2019	12 November 2024	Rodrigues, Outer Islands and Territorial Integrity	MSM	P. Jugnauth	
	Navin Ramgoolam	22 November 2024	Incumbent	Rodrigues and Outer Islands	PTr	N. Ramgoolam	
