= Govind =

Govind may refer to:

- An alternate spelling of Govinda, which is a name in Hinduism given to the god Krishna. It means "cowherd."
- The name Govind is commonly used in Sikhism to refer to God. It is derived from "Gobinda" which means Preserver of the World in Panjābi. The name is used many times in the Guru Granth Sahib; for example: "Every day, hour and moment, I continually sing and speak of Govind, Govind, the Lord of the Universe."
- Govind, more often written Gobind, is a name sometimes used for the Tenth Sikh Guru, Guru Gobind Singh. The Dasam Granth, which is the second Sikh Scripture written by the Tenth Guru, mentions the name twice:
  - On page 643, line 3: "O Lord! I have forsaken all other doors and have caught hold of only Thy door. O Lord! Thou has caught hold of my arm; I, Govind, am Thy slave, kindly take (care of me and) protect my honour. 864."
  - On page 728, line 4: "All the gods, taking permission of Krishna, bowed their heads and went back to their abodes; in their delight, they have named Krishna as 'Govind'."

== People ==
- Thorrun Govind, British pharmacist and solicitor
- Véronique Leu-Govind, Mauritian politician

== See also ==
- Govinda (disambiguation)
- Govindam (disambiguation)
