= Govindrao =

Govindrao or Govind Rao is a Marathi given name that may refer to

- Govindrao Adik (1939–2015), Indian politician
- Govindrao Patwardhan (1925–1996), Indian harmonium and organ player
- Govindrao Tembe (1881–1955), Indian harmonium player, stage actor and music composer
- Govind Rao Gaekwad (died 1800), Indian Maharaja
- Baburao Govindrao Shirke (1918–2010), Indian businessman
- Pratap Govindrao Pawar, Indian industrialist
- Prataprao Govindrao Chikhalikar (born 1960), Indian politician

== See also ==
- Govind
