= Government Portal of Mauritius =

Official Mauritian Government's Website

Mauritius Government Portal
- Website type: Web portal
- Available in: English, French
- Editor: Government Online Center
- Website: www.govmu.org
- Commercial: No
- Registration: online
- Current status: Online
- Written in: Microsoft SharePoint and Microsoft SQL

The Government Portal of Mauritius is the official web portal of the Government of Mauritius. It presents information resources and online services from government sources, accessible from a single point. The portal provides access to websites of ministries and their departments, websites of state bodies and e-Services. It also provides various information such as weather, calendar of events, news articles, videos and polls among others.

On 30 November 2014, the Government Portal, Websites of Ministries and Departments, e-services and email address of Government officials was completely migrated to www.govmu.org from the previous domain www.gov.mu. The .mu domain is owned by Internet Direct Ltd, not the government of Mauritius, who is engaged in a legal dispute with the company over alleged non-payment for the use of the domain name since 2000.

== History ==
A new version of the portal was launched on 22 February 2013. The site was done by the firm FRCI LTD and its partner LinkDev and cost Rs 50 Million, a cost that raised eyebrows. In 2016, a United Nations e-Government Survey gave the portal a ranking based on information from an nonexistent portal.

== Overview ==
The portal has a number of features to make it easier to find government information and services:

=== e-Services ===
It provides citizens and residents in Mauritius with a one-stop access to all government e-Service. There are two types of e-service, one requires registration as a member and the second provides forms in PDF format that a user can fill and submit online. Several services also accept credit card payment. According to a 2014 National Audit Office report, the usage of most of the e-Services has remained quite low, two years after the setting up of the new portal, while 42% of them have not been used at all. Further, except for four e-Services, the remaining e-Services were minimally used and therefore, the public was still making applications/payments manually.

=== Citizens ===
The Citizens section provides quick links to information about Life Events, Health Sports and Leisure, Education, Employment and Career, Taxes and Registration, Housing, Social Services, Transport, Crime and Justice, Citizen Rights and Safety and Security.

=== Non-Citizens ===
The Non-Citizens section provides quick links to information about visiting Mauritius, Relocating/Immigrating to Mauritius, Weddings in Mauritius, Working and Living in Mauritius, Studying in Mauritius, Doing Business in Mauritius and Permit and Licences.

=== Government ===
The Government section provides quick links to information about the Government, Government Directory, Govt. Who's Who, Info. and Policies, Vacancies, Embassies and Consulates, Resources for Civil Servants, Green Mauritius, Publications and Research, Local Government and Rodrigues and Outer Islands.

=== Business ===
The Business section provides quick links to information about Starting a Business, Invest in Mauritius, Small and Medium Enterprises, Permit and Licences, Finance and Grants, Taxes, Import and Export, Employment and Training, Health and Safety, Business Statistics, Green Mauritius and other links.
