= Rajen Narsinghen =

Mauritian politician

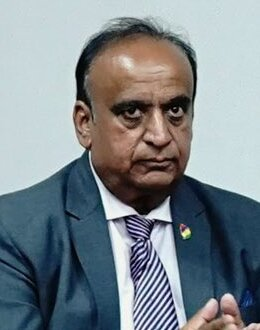
- Rajen Narsinghen in 2025

Junior Minister of Foreign Affairs, Regional Integration and International Trade
- Incumbent
- Assumed office 22 November 2024

Personal details
- Party: Labour Party

Rajen Narsinghen is a Mauritian politician from the Labour Party (PTr). He has served as Junior Minister of Foreign Affairs, Regional Integration and International Trade in the fourth Navin Ramgoolam cabinet since 2024. Narsinghen was previously a Senior Lecturer and Dean of Faculty at the University of Mauritius.
