= Maneesh Gobin =

Mauritian politician

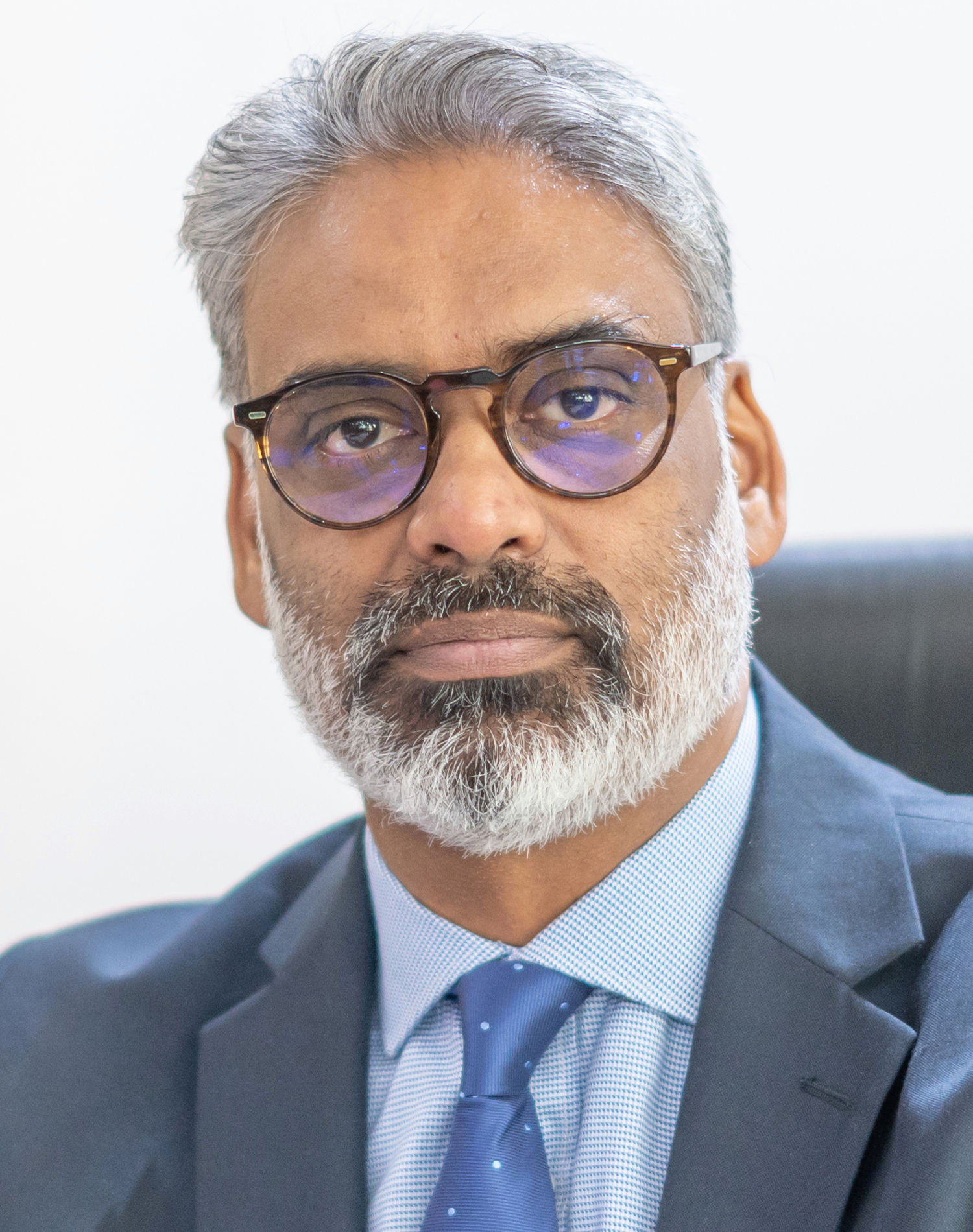

Attorney-General of Mauritius Minister of Justice, Human Rights and Institutional Reforms
- In office 14 September 2017 – 12 November 2024
- Prime Minister: Pravind Jugnauth
- Preceded by: Ravi Yerrigadoo
- Succeeded by: Gavin Glover

Minister of Foreign Affairs, Regional Integration and International Cooperation
- In office 30 August 2023 – 12 November 2024
- Prime Minister: Pravind Jugnauth
- Preceded by: Alan Ganoo
- Succeeded by: Ritish Ramful

Minister of Agro-Industry and Food Security
- In office 12 November 2019 – 30 August 2023
- Prime Minister: Pravind Jugnauth
- Preceded by: Mahen Seeruttun
- Succeeded by: Vikram Hurdoyal

Member of Parliament; for No.7 Piton and Rivière du Rempart
- In office 8 November 2019 – 4 October 2024
- Preceded by: Sir Anerood Jugnauth
- Succeeded by: Sandeep Prayag

Member of Parliament; for No.13 Rivière des Anguilles and Souillac
- In office 11 December 2014 – 6 October 2019
- Preceded by: Pradeep Peetumber
- Succeeded by: Kailesh Jagutpal

Personal details
- Party: Militant Socialist Movement
- Profession: Barrister at law

Maneesh Gobin is a Mauritian barrister at law, former magistrate and former minister.

== Career before politics ==
Maneesh Gobin started his legal career in 1999 and worked in a variety of legal positions within the civil service, namely as Senior District Magistrate, Senior State Counsel, and representative of the DPP and State Law Office. He was Chief Legal Adviser of the ICAC until 6 June 2008. Gobin also worked as Returning Officer for various elections held in Mauritius. He also practised as a freelance lawyer, such as Top FM's defence lawyer in December 2012 in a defamation case raised by Sheila Bappoo who felt hurt by the term Missié Macarena, as well as representing Raj Dayal in February 2016 in a defamation case against Anil Bachoo.

== Political career ==
Gobin was elected to the National Assembly for the first time at the 2014 General Elections at the top of the list in Constituency No.13 Rivière des Anguilles and Souillac as a member for the MSM, running under the Alliance Lepep coalition. In the same constituency, his running mate Bashir Jahangeer was also elected but Menon Murday was not. He presided over the parliamentary committee of ICAC in 2016. In January 2017 he became Chief Whip, succeeding Mahen Jhugroo.

On 14 September 2017 he was nominated as Attorney-General of Mauritius after Ravi Yerrigadoo's resignation due to the Yerrigadoogate money laundering scandal.

At the 2019 General Elections, Gobin was a candidate of the MSM within Alliance Morisien at Constituency No.7 Piton and Rivière du Rempart and was elected in first position, followed by his running mates of the Alliance Morisien, Ravi Dhaliah and Kalpana Koonjoo-Shah. He was again given the portfolio of Ministry of Justice and Attorney General. From 2019 to 2023 he also held the portfolio of Minister of Agro-Industry and Food Security. From 31 August 2023 to the general elections of November 2024, Gobin held the position of Attorney General as well as Minister of Foreign Affairs, Regional Integration and International Cooperation.

Despite being highly visible at press conferences leading up to the 2024 General Elections, Maneesh Gobin did not receive the investiture of any party, mainly because of the Cerf Gate scandal, drug kingpin Franklin's extradition, as well as his low rating in Constituency No.7.
