= Govinda Govinda =

Govinda Govinda may refer to:

- Govinda Govinda (1994 film), an Indian Telugu-language supernatural thriller film
- Govinda Govinda (2021 film), an Indian Kannada-language comedy thriller film

== See also ==
- Govinda (disambiguation)
