= Govinda (disambiguation) =

Govinda is a name of the Hindu deity Krishna.

Govinda may also refer to:

== People ==
- Govinda II (reign 774–780 CE), King of Rashtrakuta dynasty of India after Krishna I
- Govinda III (reign 793–814 CE), Indian ruler of Rashtrakuta dynasty and a successor of Dhruva Dharavarsha
- Govinda IV (reign 930–935 CE), King of Rashtrakuta dynasty of India after Amoghavarsha II
- Govinda Bhagavatpada, Guru of the Advaita philosopher, Adi Shankara
- Gour Govinda (reign 1260–1303), last King of Gour
- Anagarika Govinda (1898–1985), expositor of Tibetan Buddhism
- Govinda (actor) (born 1963), Bollywood actor and politician
- Govinda Julian Saputra (born 1996), Indonesian basketball player

== Other uses ==
- Govinda (Dahi Handi), a participant in the Indian festival Dahi Handi
- "Govinda" (Kula Shaker song), a 1996 song by the British band Kula Shaker
- "Govinda" (Radha Krishna Temple song), a 1970 single by the Radha Krsna Temple
- Govinda, a character in Hermann Hesse's Siddhartha
- Govinda's, a chain of vegetarian restaurants run by the International Society for Krishna Consciousness
- Milvus migrans govinda, a bird of prey, subspecies of Black kite

== See also ==
- Govind (disambiguation) (commonly used in Sikhism)
- Govindam (disambiguation)
- Govinda Govinda (disambiguation)
