= Sydney Pierre =

Mauritian politician

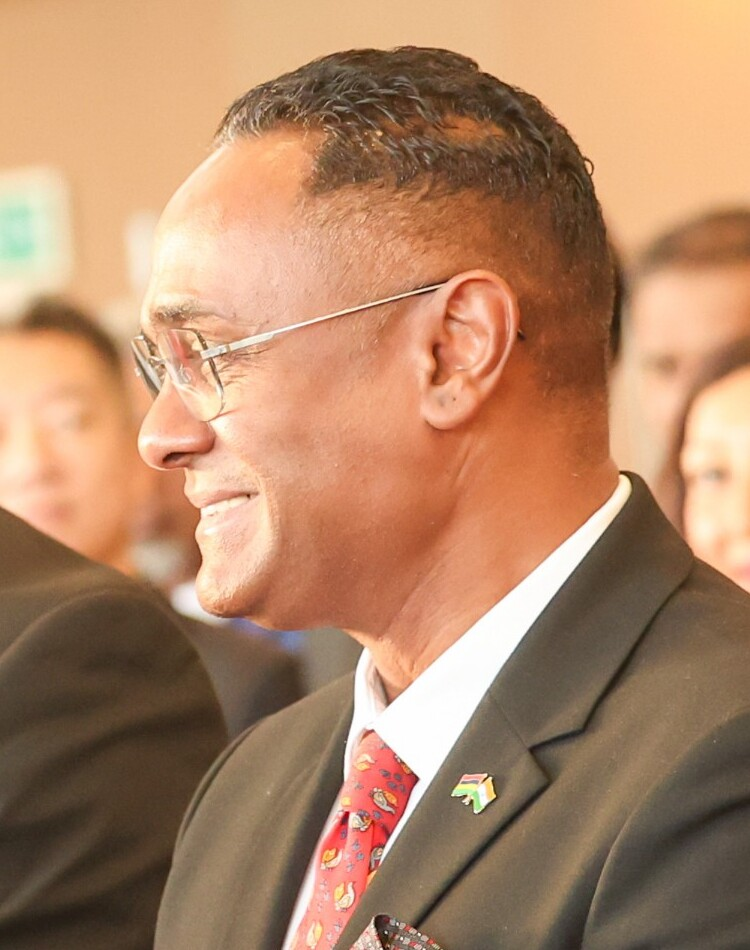
- Sydney Pierre in 2025

Junior Minister
- In office 22 November 2024 – 31 July 2026
- Prime Minister: Navin Ramgoolam
- Minister: Richard Duval
- Ministry: Tourism

Member of Parliament; for Stanley and Rose Hill
- Incumbent
- Assumed office 12 November 2024
- Preceded by: Ivan Collendavelloo

Personal details
- Party: Fron Militan Progresis (since 2026)
- Other political affiliations: Labour Party (until 2026)

Jean Sydney Pierre is a Mauritian politician from the Fron Militan Progresis (FMP) party. He was appointed as Junior Minister of Tourism in the fourth cabinet of Prime Minister Navin Ramgoolam in 2024.

Pierre was dismissed as junior minister on 31 July 2026, after voting against the government's reforms to the pension system. He was the only MP from the governing Alliance du Changement coalition to oppose the amendments, Prime Minister Ramgoolam said his decision was "unacceptable". In response, Pierre said he did not intend to disappoint the prime minister and that he would remain a Labour Party member. Pierre, however, left the party on 16 October, stating his beliefs were no longer in alignment with them or the government as a whole. While initially intending to sit as an independent, days later he joined the opposition Fron Militan Progresis party.
