= Khushal Lobine =

Mauritian politician

The Honourable Khushal Lobine MP

Leader of the New Democrats
- Incumbent
- Assumed office December 2024
- Preceded by: Richard Duval

Member of the Mauritian Parliament
- Incumbent
- Assumed office November 2019
- Constituency: La Caverne–Phoenix

Personal details
- Born: 15 June 1977 (age 49) Mauritius
- Party: New Democrats
- Education: University of Wolverhampton

Khushal Lobine, more commonly known as Kushal Lobine (born c. 1977) is a Mauritian politician.

== Education & legal career ==
He grew up in Mauritius, studied law at University of Wolverhampton and at Cardiff Law School in England before returning to Mauritius to practise as a barrister.

== Political career ==
Lobine was a member of the Labour Party in 2014. At the 2019 general election Lobine stood as candidate of the Parti Mauricien Social Démocrate (PMSD) within the L'Alliance Nationale. He was elected as First Member for Constituency No.15 La Caverne Phoenix in the National Assembly. Patrick Assirvaden and Gilbert Bablee were elected as second and third members respectively in the same constituency.

In April 2024 Lobine formed part of a splinter group of politicians who left the PMSD to form a new party called the New Democrats. By October 2024 the latter became part of a coalition known as Alliance du Changement and Lobine received its investiture at Constituency No.15 La Caverne Phoenix during the 2024 Mauritian general election. He was elected, along with Patrick Assirvaden (PTr) and Fawzi Allymun (MMM), the other two members of the Alliance du Changement in this constituency.
