= Ministry of Financial Services and Economic Planning =

Government ministry of Mauritius

- Ministère des Services financiers et de la Planification économique

Agency overview
- Formed: 15 December 2014
- Jurisdiction: Government of Mauritius
- Headquarters: Ébène, Mauritius
- Minister responsible: Jyoti Jeetun, Minister of Financial Services and Economic Planning
- Agency executive: Devi Gujadhur-Nowbuth, Permanent Secretary
- Website: financialservices.govmu.org

The Ministry of Financial Services and Economic Planning (French: Ministère des Services financiers et de la Planification économique) is a ministry in the government of Mauritius responsible for the financial services sector of the country and as well as upholding good governance.

Jyoti Jeetun of the Mauritian Militant Movement is the incumbent minister since November 2024, having been appointed by prime minister Navin Ramgoolam under his fourth government.

== History ==
The ministry was established in 2014 as the ministry of Financial Services, Good Governance and Institutional Reforms under Sir Anerood Jugnauth's government. It is the newest ministry to be established with financial services and good governance becoming its focus albeit with the merger of the institutional reforms portfolio. Roshi Bhadain became the first minister appointed to the portfolio.

In September 2017, the ministry's portfolio would be modified to remove the Institutional Reforms unit as it was transferred to the justice ministry. Under Pravind Jugnauth's governments, three ministers would oversee the ministry: Sudhir Sesungkur, Mahen Seeruttun and Sunil Bholah.

Following Navin Ramgoolam's victory in the general election of 2024, Jyoti Jeetun of the Mauritian Militant Movement was appointed as minister but with a modified ministerial portfolio title of Financial Services and Economic Planning. The good governance unit remained however the economic planning department from the finance ministry was merged with the ministry.

== Responsibilities ==
With the financial sector playing an important role in Mauritius' economy, the ministry's main responsibility includes the promotion and development of the sector. Regulation and development of the financial sector as well as promoting the position of Mauritius as an international hub for investment are some of the key responsibilities under the financial sector unit.

In addition, the coordination and effectiveness of anti-money laundering measures and counter-financing of terrorism are also under the responsibility of the ministry, with the aim of strengthening the financial system of the country.

Good governance and accountability, which remains an integral part of its responsibilities, continue to be promoted across the public and private sectors. The ministry gives guidance, training and tools in facilitating the best practices of governance within Mauritius.

After the inclusion of the economic planning unit from the finance ministry, the ministry also now includes the responsibility for economic planning via the implementation of Vision 2050 and a 10-year National Development Plan. The coordination between the alignment of national and sectoral policies are also within its purview.

== Organisation ==
=== Departments ===
The ministry is divided between the following departments:

- Financial Services Unit
- Economic Planning
- Promotion of Good Governance

=== Institutions ===
The following institutions are under the responsibility of the ministry:

==== Statutory boards ====
- Financial Services Commission (FSC)
- Financial Intelligent Unit (FIU)
- Insurance Industry Compensation Fund (IICF)
- Integrity Reporting Services Agency (IRSA)
- Financial Reporting Council (FRC)
- National Committee on Corporate Governance (NCCG)

==== Departments ====
- Office of Public Sector Governance (OPSG)

==== State-owned companies ====
- State Insurance Company of Mauritius Ltd (SICOM)
- National Insurance Company Ltd (NIC)
- National Property Fund Ltd (NPLF)
- Financial Services Institute Company Ltd (FSI)

==== Private-owned companies ====
- Stock Exchanged of Mauritius Ltd (SEM)

== List of ministers ==
Portrait	Name	Term of office		Portfolio name	Party	Prime minister	Ref.
Portrait	Name	Took office	Left office	Portfolio name	Party	Prime minister	Ref.
	Roshi Bhadain	15 December 2014	23 January 2017	Financial Services, Good Governance and Institutional Reforms	MSM	A. Jugnauth	
	Sudhir Sesungkur	23 January 2017	14 September 2017	Financial Services, Good Governance and Institutional Reforms	MSM	P. Jugnauth	
	Sudhir Sesungkur	14 September 2017	12 November 2019	Financial Services and Good Governance	MSM	P. Jugnauth	
	Mahen Seeruttun	12 November 2019	11 February 2024	Financial Services and Good Governance	MSM	P. Jugnauth	
	Sunil Bholah	11 February 2024	12 November 2024	Financial Services and Good Governance	MSM	P. Jugnauth	
	Jyoti Jeetun	22 November 2024	Incumbent	Financial Services and Economic Planning	MMM	N. Ramgoolam	
