= Anishta Babooram =

Mauritian politician

The Honourable Anishta Babooram MP
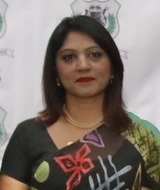
- Babooram in 2025

Junior Minister
- Incumbent
- Assumed office 7 August 2024
- Prime Minister: Navin Ramgoolam
- Minister: Anil Bachoo
- Ministry: Health and Wellness
- In office 22 November 2024 – 7 August 2024
- Prime Minister: Navin Ramgoolam
- Minister: Arianne Navarre-Marie
- Ministry: Gender Equality and Family Welfare

Member of Parliament; for Vieux Grand Port and Rose Belle
- Incumbent
- Assumed office 8 November 2019
- Preceded by: Mahen Seeruttun

Personal details
- Born: 1985 (age 40–41) L'Escalier, Grand Port District, Mauritius
- Party: Labour Party
- Education: University of Mauritius

Anishta Babooram (born in 1985) is a Mauritian activist and politician.

== Education & activism ==
Anishta Babooram's father died when she was 10 years old and her mother brought up Anishta and her brother in the village of L'Escalier. She studied at Loretto Convent of Mahébourg before starting an internship in a local weekly newspaper. Later she studied law at the University of Mauritius. Babooram then went to England to study international law whilst working part-time at the Mauritian Embassy located in London. She founded non-profit organisation The Rising.

In 2012 she married Aditya Seeruttun, thus changing her name to Anishta Babooram-Seeruttun and she also relocated to Triolet. In 2014 she was nominated as member of the National Preventive Mechanism Division (NPMD) of the Human Rights Commission by the president of Mauritius. Hervé Lassemillante headed this small team of 3 people. Babooram signed a work contract of 4 years, but on 6 June 2017 it was rescinded without notice. She soon revealed that it could be due to her interview in November 2016 on private radio station Radio Plus when she spoke about the suspicious death-in-custody of police constable Arvind Hurreechurn after his arrest at the airport with 2 kg of heroin. A few days later, on 30 October 2016, the resident of Rivière-Du-Rempart was found dead in his jail-cell at the Moka detention centre, after apparently hanging himself from a hand-basin.

== Political career ==
When she was 17 years old Babooram joined the youth league of the Labour Party. At the 10 November 2024 general elections, Babooram was a candidate of Alliance du Changement in Constituency No.11 - Vieux Grand Port and Rose Belle. She was elected in first place with 57.6% of votes. She took an oath as Junior Minister of Gender Equality at the State House on 22 November 2024. On 7 August 2025, following tensions with Minister of Gender Equality Arianne Navarre-Marie, she was transferred to the Ministry of Health and Wellness under Anil Bachoo as announced by the Office of the President.
