= Joanna Bérenger =

Mauritian politician

The Honourable Joanna Bérenger
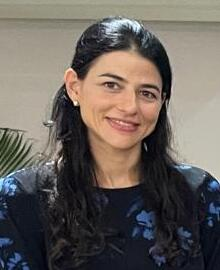
- Bérenger in 2025

Junior Minister
- In office 22 November 2024 – 23 March 2026
- Prime Minister: Navin Ramgoolam
- Minister: Rajesh Bhagwan
- Ministry: Environment, Solid Waste Management and Climate Change

Member of Parliament; for Vacoas and Floréal
- Incumbent
- Assumed office 12 November 2019
- Preceded by: Santaram Baboo

Personal details
- Born: 28 April 1989 (age 37) Vacoas
- Party: Fron Militan Progresis (since 2026)
- Other political affiliations: Mauritian Militant Movement (2010–2026)
- Education: Panthéon-Sorbonne University; University of Lancashire

Joanna Marie Bérenger (born 28 April 1989) is a Mauritian politician. She is a member of the Fron Militan Progresis (FMP) party.

== Early life and career ==
Joanna Bérenger is the daughter of Paul Bérenger and Arline Perrier. She has worked as a Project Manager of private enterprise Omnicane Limited, on the Mon-Trésor Smart City Project.

== Political career ==
Joanna claims to have been involved in political activities in Vacoas since 2010. At the 7 November 2019 general elections she was elected to the National Assembly as a candidate of the MMM at Constituency No.16 Vacoas-Floréal.

On 13 April 2026, she resigned from the MMM along with Paul Bérenger and Chetan Baboolall to sit as independents. Bérenger later joined the FMP, which her father established shortly after their departure from the MMM.

=== 2019 L'Express article ===
During the campaign leading up to the 2019 general election, Joanna Bérenger was the subject of a news article titled Zak dans tante (literally meaning "Jackfruit in the basket" and casting doubt about the legitimacy of the unborn child), about her pregnancy and imminent entry into Parliament as a pregnant woman. Journalist Hansa Nancoo later clarified that she had not meant to hurt Joanna Bérenger, and that the title was only meant to act as "click-bait". Newspaper publisher L'Express later apologised.
