= Osman Mahomed =

Mauritian politician (born 1968)

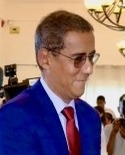
- Osman Mahomed in 2024

Minister of Land Transport
- Incumbent
- Assumed office 22 November 2024

Elected member in Constituency No.2
- In office November 2019 – October 2024

Elected member in Constituency No.2
- In office December 2014 – October 2019

Personal details
- Born: 15 March 1968 (age 58) Mauritius
- Party: Labour Party
- Spouse: Amidah Mahomed
- Children: 2

Mahomed Osman Cassam Mahomed (born 15 March 1968) is a Mauritian politician from the Labour Party (PTr). He has served as Minister of Land Transport in the fourth Navin Ramgoolam cabinet since 2024.

== Entry in politics ==
Osman Mahomed was elected at the General Elections of 2014 in Constituency No.2 (Port Louis South - Port Louis Central) which includes Ward 4 (Vallée Pitot, Tranquebar and part of Plaine Verte) and was a member of the Opposition. In November 2019 he was again elected in Constituency No.2, again serving until 2024 in Opposition.

== Education and profession before politics ==
In 1993 he graduated in Civil Engineering at the age of 25 from the National University of Singapore and at the Nanyang University of Technology of Singapore. Twelve years later he graduated with an MBA from the University of Mauritius in 2005. Prior to becoming a politician, Osman Mahomed worked as a Civil Engineer in Singapore for 6 years before returning to Mauritius. He joined the Civil Service in 2001 and progressed to become the Executive Director of Commission Maurice Ile durable (MID) at the Prime Minister's Office until 2014.

== Manslaughter of cyclist Siddick Tagaully ==
In October 2017 near the junction of Ollier Avenue and Berthaud Avenue in Rose Hill, 60-year-old cyclist Siddick Tagaully was involved in a collision with a car driven by Amidah Mahomed, Osman Mahomed's 44-year-old wife. Tagaully died of skull fracture at the Victoria Hospital in Candos a few hours later.
