= Integrated Resort Scheme =

Mauritius public policy

The Integrated Resort Scheme (IRS) is an initiative of the Government of Mauritius in collaboration with the Board of Investment of Mauritius. This program is designed to facilitate the acquisition of resort and residential property by non-citizens on the island.

Until recent changes to legislation foreigners were not permitted to purchase property in Mauritius. In 2002 the Mauritian Government took the decision to open the market to foreign buyers on a restricted basis through this project named as IRS, which permits the construction and sale of luxury villas to foreigners in particular locations. To date eight projects have been successfully completed prior to the International Financial Crisis in 2008; Tamarina, Anahita, Villa Valriche, ClubMed Albion and Belle Rive. Three developments were since completed in 2013; La Balise, Matala and Azuri. The programme has however been plagued by a catalogue of false starts and a large number of fictional projects that were never delivered to their potential owners (Corniche Bay, River Club, Beau Sejour etc.). This legacy of failure appears to have been overcome and the current crop of developers have successfully negotiated the complexities inherent in the failures of these earlier developments. As a result of these failures the most recent projects to complete have taken a more innovative approach to the uses found within the IRS estates and innovated to establish market position.

Through the IRS, international buyers can become Mauritian residents once they acquire a luxury property on the island. The villa owner and his family are able to reside in Mauritius as long as he holds the property.

The IRS are often accompanied by extensive and high-class leisure and recreational facilities such as golf courses, marinas or wellness centres.

== Minimum investment requirement ==
Under the scheme, outsiders are permitted to buy property with a minimum investment of $500,000 (about £350,000) plus a fixed land registration duty of $70,000. To date the average cost of an IRS residence in Mauritius has been in excess of US$1.6 million.

== The luxury villas ==
Villas sold under the scheme form part of a complex of luxury villas of international standard and high-class facilities and amenities.

By law, the extent of land for each villa shall not exceed 1.25 arpents (0.5276 hectares). The villa can be acquired on the basis of a plan or during the construction phase.

== Residence permit under IRS ==
The acquisition of a villa under the Scheme grants resident status to the investor, his spouse and dependents. A residence permit granted under the IRS remains valid until such time as the non-citizen holds immovable property in Mauritius under the scheme. Application for Residence Permit shall be made at the time of purchasing a villa in an IRS.

== Those who can apply ==
Any one of the following can apply under the Scheme:

- A non-citizen of Mauritius (including his spouse and dependants);
- A foreign company under the Companies Act (of Mauritius) 2001;
- A citizen of Mauritius;
- A company incorporated under the Companies Act 2001.
