= Chetan Baboolall =

Mauritian politician

- Baboolall in 2024

MP for Montagne Blanche–Grand River South East
- Incumbent
- Assumed office 29 November 2024

Personal details
- Party: Fron Militan Progresis (since 2026)
- Other political affiliations: Mauritian Militant Movement (2010–2026)

Chetan Anand Baboolall is a Mauritian politician from the Mauritian Militant Movement (MMM). He was elected a member of the National Assembly of Mauritius in 2024.

On 13 April 2026, he resigned from the MMM along with Paul Bérenger and Joanna Bérenger to sit as an independent. Baboolall joined the Fron Militan Progresis party shortly after, which was formed by Paul Bérenger. On 6 August, Baboollal was appointed as leader of the opposition, replacing Joe Lesjongard.
