= Govindam =

Govindam may refer to:

- Bhaja Govindam, a Hindu poem
- Geeta Govindam, an Indian soap opera
- Geetha Govindam, a 2018 Indian film
