= Michael Sik Yuen =

Mauritian politician

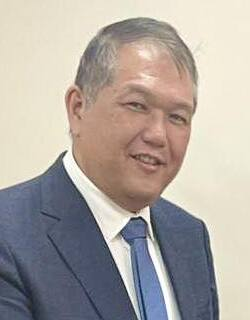
- Michael Sik Yuen in 2025

Minister of Commerce and Consumer Protection
- Incumbent
- Assumed office 22 November 2024

Personal details
- Party: Labour Party
- Website: michaelsikyuen.com

John Michaël Tzoun Sao Yeung Sik Yuen is a Sino-Mauritian politician from the Labour Party (PTr). He has served as Minister of Commerce and Consumer Protection in the fourth Navin Ramgoolam cabinet since 2024.
