= Avinash Ramtohul =

Mauritian politician

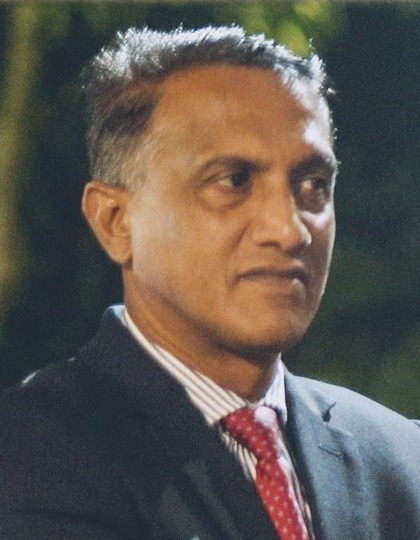
- Avinash Ramtohul in 2025

Minister of Information Technology, Communication and Innovation
- Incumbent
- Assumed office 22 November 2024

Personal details
- Party: Labour Party

Avinash Ramtohul is a Mauritian politician from the Labour Party (PTr). He has served as Minister of Information Technology, Communication and Innovation in the fourth Navin Ramgoolam cabinet since 2024.
