= Arianne Navarre-Marie =

Mauritian politician (born 1961)

The Honourable Arianne Navarre-Marie
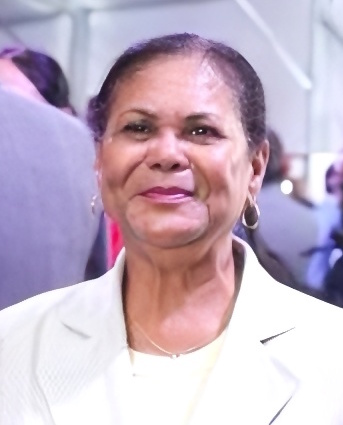
- Navarre-Marie in 2026

Deputy Prime Minister of Mauritius
- Incumbent
- Assumed office 4 May 2026
- President: Dharam Gokhool
- Prime Minister: Navin Ramgoolam
- Preceded by: Paul Bérenger

Minister of Gender Equality and Family Welfare Women's Rights, Child Development and Family Welfare (2000–2005)
- Incumbent
- Assumed office 22 November 2024
- Prime Minister: Navin Ramgoolam
- Preceded by: Kalpana Koonjoo-Shah
- In office 17 September 2000 – 5 July 2005
- Prime Minister: Anerood Jugnauth; Paul Bérenger
- Preceded by: Indira Thacoor-Sidaya
- Succeeded by: Indranee Seebun

Junior Minister
- In office 6 April 1996 – 21 June 1997
- Prime Minister: Navin Ramgoolam
- Minister: Paul Bérenger
- Ministry: Foreign Affairs, International Trade and Regional Cooperation

Member of Parliament; for Grand River North West and Port Louis West
- Incumbent
- Assumed office 8 November 2019
- Preceded by: Alain Wong
- In office 21 December 1995 – 6 October 2014
- Preceded by: Alain Laridon
- Succeeded by: Patrice Armance

Member of Parliament; for Savanne and Black River
- In office 12 June 1982 – 17 June 1983
- Preceded by: Jean-Claude Augustave
- Succeeded by: Gaëtan Gungurum

Personal details
- Born: 3 March 1961 (age 65) Plaine Verte, Port-Louis, Mauritius
- Party: Mauritian Militant Movement
- Spouse: Yvon Marie (m. 1983)

Marie Arianne Navarre-Marie (born 3 March 1961) is a Mauritian politician and current Deputy Prime Minister of Mauritius, the first woman and first Chagossian to hold the post. She is also serving as Minister of Gender Equality and Family Welfare since November 2024, previously holding the same ministry from 2000 to 2005 under a modified portfolio as minister of Women's Rights, Child Development and Family Welfare.

A member of the Mauritian Militant Movement, Navarre-Marie was first elected to the Legislative Assembly in 1982 at the age of 21, becoming the then youngest elected member. She has subsequently been a candidate in every general election since 1995 and became a member of Parliament again between 1995 and 2014 and again from 2019.

Navarre-Marie and Paul Bérenger are the only two members of parliament elected in 1982, 1995 and 2024, when a single alliance won all of the 60 directly elected mainland seats.

== Early life and education ==
Navarre-Marie was born on 3 March 1961 at Plaine Verte, located in Port Louis. A daughter of Chagossian parents, her father, Lewis Derville-Louis Permal, was from Six Îles in Chagos and her mother, Marie Aimée, was born in Diego Garcia. Her father died in 2014 at the age of 89 whilst her mother continues to live in the United Kingdom. Navarre-Marie has six other siblings, all of whom now live in the United Kingdom and she is the only member of her family remaining in Mauritius.

She attended Baie-du-Tombeau Government School and eventually went to Bhujoharry College for her secondary education. Between her secondary education and tertiary education, she became a teacher and a sales and administrative executive. Navarre-Marie continue her studies and pursued a degree in economics and management, followed by a diploma in administrative management.

== Political career ==
Navarre-Marie started her political career in 1982 after she ran as a candidate for the Mauritian Militant Movement under the MMM-PSM alliance in the constituency of Savanne and Black River. Alan Ganoo became one of her running mates for the constituency. She was elected successfully as third member for the constituency, with all of the other coalition candidates winning all of their contested seats because of the 60–0 victory that the coalition received. At the age of 21, she became the youngest elected member of the Legislative Assembly at that time.

She remained as a backbencher and when the MMM split up due to political and personal differences between party leader and prime minister, Anerood Jugnauth, and finance minister and general secretary, Paul Bérenger, Navarre-Marie remained with Bérenger's faction. After the early dissolution of the assembly and calling of general elections, she ran for reelection in the same constituency in 1983 alongside Alan Ganoo, who had remained with the MMM after the split, and Bidianand Jhurry. However, the trio did not get elected and Navarre-Marie was relegated to sixth place instead.

Navarre-Marie was elected as a municipal councillor in Port Louis and served from 1985 until 1988. She would not contest the two following general elections in 1987 and 1991 and would run again only in 1995, under the constituency of Grand River North West and Port Louis West. Her party, the MMM, had forged an alliance between the Labour Party (PTr) headed by Navin Ramgoolam and she would go on to be elected as third member for the constituency. This would be the second time that she was elected under a 60–0 victory.

In the aftermath of the election, Navarre-Marie was appointed as junior minister under the ministry of Foreign Affairs, International Trade and Regional Cooperation. Paul Bérenger served as the senior minister for the portfolio. She would remain in office until the MMM left following the dismissal of Bérenger as foreign minister in June 1997.

At the 2000 general election, where the MMM partnered with Jugnauth's Militant Socialist Movement (MSM) under the MSM/MMM alliance, she was reelected as member for the same constituency. Navarre-Marie received her first ministerial appointment under the new government and was appointed as minister of Women's Rights, Child Development and Family Welfare. She would continue to serve her portfolio after Paul Bérenger became prime minister following the rotation agreement between Jugnauth and Bérenger.

Navarre-Marie would go on to be reelected in 2005 for Grand River North West and Port Louis West and was returned as first member for the constituency, the first time she achieved that feat since running for the first time in 1995. However, Bérenger lost his parliamentary majority in the aftermath of the election and the MMM returned to opposition. Navarre-Marie would also be reelected in 2010 but would go on to lose the 2014 general election. She ran as a candidate for the constituency of Port Louis North and Montagne Longue, having to give way for a Labour candidate in her constituency of Grand River North West and Port Louis West. In 2019, she ran once again and this time in her old constituency of Grand River North West and Port Louis West and was elected on the basis of the Best Loser System. This was the first time she was elected via that provision.

In 2024, Navarre-Marie ran for reelection under the banner of Alliance du Changement, a coalition of Ramgoolam's PTr and Bérenger's MMM, for the same constituency and was elected as the second member for the constituency. This was to be the third 60–0 victory that she experienced during her political career. She and Paul Bérenger became the only people to have been elected under the three 60-0 victories in Mauritian political history. In addition, the duo are the only remaining MPs who were elected from 1982. Navarre-Marie became a member of the government as minister of gender equality and family welfare, a post she previously held from 2000 to 2005. She was sworn in along with other members of the government on 22 November 2024.

== Personal life ==
Navarre-Marie is married to Yvon Marie, whom she married in April 1983. The couple have two children: Magalie, who lives in the United Kingdom and is a housing officer at the West Sussex Council, and Jean-David, a credit manager for a private company.
