= Shakeel Mohamed =

Mauritian barrister and politician (born 1968)

The Honourable Shakeel Mohamed GCSK
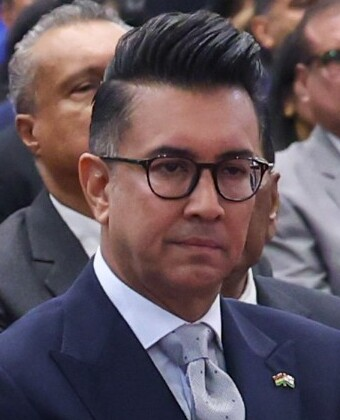
- Mohamed in 2025

Minister of Housing and Lands
- Incumbent
- Assumed office 22 November 2024
- Prime Minister: Navin Ramgoolam
- Preceded by: Steven Obeegadoo

Leader of the Opposition
- In office 15 April 2024 – 3 June 2024
- President: Prithvirajsing Roopun
- Prime Minister: Pravind Jugnauth
- Preceded by: Xavier-Luc Duval
- Succeeded by: Arvin Boolell

Minister of Labour, Industrial Relations and Employment
- In office 18 May 2010 – 6 October 2014
- Prime Minister: Navin Ramgoolam
- Preceded by: Jean-François Chaumière
- Succeeded by: Soodesh Callichurn
Senior political offices
Leader of the Labour Party Parliamentary Group
In office 20 December 2014 – 10 October 2019
Leader	Navin Ramgoolam
Parliamentary offices
Member of Parliament; for Port Louis Maritime and Port Louis East
Incumbent
Assumed office 6 May 2010
Preceded by	Anwar Husnoo
Member of Parliament; for Rivière des Anguilles and Souillac
In office 12 July 2005 – 31 March 2010
Preceded by	Veda Balamoody
Succeeded by	Cousiga Chedumbrum

Personal details
- Born: 25 August 1968 (age 58) Port-Louis, Mauritius
- Party: Labour Party (2000–present); MSM (1993–2000); Comité d'Action Mauricien (2000)
- Spouse: Hacinna Mohamed
- Children: Aydiin Mohamed; Raheel Mohamed; Mika’il; Aylan
- Parent(s): Yousuf Mohamed & Zeinah Mohamed
- Education: University of Lille; University of Buckingham
- Occupation: Politician; Barrister
- Website: http://mclawoffices.net/staff/shakeel-mohamed/

Shakeel Ahmed Yousuf Abdul Razack Mohamed (Gujarati: શકીલ મોહમ્મદ; born on 25 August 1968) is a Mauritian barrister and politician.

== Early life, family and education ==
Shakeel Mohamed is the son of Yousuf Mohamed, former MP and Minister who is himself the son of Indian born-Mauritian Minister Abdool Razack Mohamed with his second wife, Ghislaine Ducasse.

Shakeel Mohamed is an alumnus of the Collège du Saint-Esprit where he was also head of the Debate Club.

Shakeel Mohamed is an alumnus of the University of Buckingham, where he studied law. He was called to the Bar of England and Wales in 1990 by the Middle Temple Inns of Court.

== Political career ==
Mohamed started his political career as a member of the Militant Socialist Movement (MSM) and was a candidate of the MSM-RMM alliance at the December 1995 National Assembly elections in Constituency No.2 (Port Louis South and Port Louis Central) but he was not elected with 14.8% of votes. He was a member of the MSM of Anerood Jugnauth but later disagreed with him on policy issues.

At the September 2000 National Assembly elections Shakeel Mohamed was candidate in Constituency No.3 (Port Louis Maritime and Port Louis East) of the party called Comité d'Action Mauricien, which was different from the original Comité d'Action Musulman (CAM). However he was again not elected and received 11.2% of votes. He then resigned from MSM and joined the Labour Party in 2000.

At the July 2005 National Assembly elections Shakeel Mohamed was candidate of Alliance Sociale (Labour-PMXD-VF-MR-MMSM) in Constituency No.13 (Rivière des Anguilles and Souillac) and was elected for the first time with 49.3% of votes.

At the May 2010 National Assembly elections he was candidate of the Labour-PMSD-MSM coalition in Constituency No.3 (Port Louis Maritime and Port Louis East) and was elected for the second time with 40.2% of votes. He was appointed as Minister in the cabinet of Navin Ramgoolam from 2010 to 2014.

At the December 2014 National Assembly elections he was candidate of the Labour-MMM coalition in Constituency No.3 (Port Louis Maritime and Port Louis East) and was elected for the third time with 44.6% of votes. Shakeel was a member of the Opposition from 2014 to 2019. He became the Leader of the Labour Party Parliamentary Group when party leader Navin Ramgoolam was not elected to parliament in 2014.

In 2019 Shakeel Mohamed was candidate of Alliance Nationale (Labour-PMSD) at the November 2019 National Assembly elections in Constituency No.3 (Port Louis Maritime and Port Louis East) and was elected for the fourth time with 52.0% of votes. He joined the Opposition again from 2019 onwards. He also became Opposition Whip and member of the Standing Orders Committee.

== Controversies ==
=== Muslim Personal Law and polygamy ===
Shakeel Mohamed has been a proponent of the controversial Muslim Personal Law (MPL) which allows polygamy. He expressed the view that is if a man's religion allows polygamy, then he should be allowed to have more than one wife. But he replied « Heavens no ! » when asked if he would marry a second wife if the Laws would allow it. He also added that polygamy under Muslim Law is almost impossible as : «The conditions imposed by Islam are very difficult, if not impossible to meet. ». He also stressed that « There is no law in Mauritius that makes a Muslim do anything that is not Islamic. There are no laws that force us to violate our Islamic principles.».

=== Arms trafficking network defamation case ===
According to L'Express and Mauritius Justice, Shakeel Mohamed, his father and brother were falsely accused of arms trafficking.

The defamation began in 2012 when the Consumers Advocacy Platform (CAP) reported the existence of a network for the trafficking of weapons in Africa which involved Russians in partnership with Shakeel Mohamed's family, namely his brother Zakir Mohamed (CEO of company Island Air System Limited, incorporated on 13 April 2011), and whose legal advisor was their father Yousuf Mohamed. Kathi Lynn Austin, the American executive director of CAP, wrote about the formation of a new aircraft chartering company in Mauritius to enable activities of Viktor Bout, an international arms trafficker.

However in early 2019 the Supreme Court of Mauritius ordered Austin to pay Rs 1.2 Million to the Mohamed in damages, although Austin failed to appear in the Mauritian courts.

=== Gorah Issac triple murders accusation and charges drop ===
On 23 November 2015 Shakeel Mohamed was arrested for suspected conspiracy to commit murder, giving instructions to commit murder and procurement of revolver which resulted in the murders of 3 political activists Zulfikhar Bheeky, Babal Joomun and Yousouf Moorad by gunfire at Gorah Issac Road in Plaine Verte, Port Louis on 26 October 1996 during the campaign for municipal elections. Since 1996 these political assassinations became known as Affaire Gorah Issac. At these 1996 elections Shakeel Mohamed was the candidate for the MSM in the ward of Vallée-Pitot. At the start of the scandal and on 27 October 1996 Paul Bérenger, whose party MMM was in alliance with Navin Ramgoolam's Labour Party, openly accused Shakeel Mohamed for his involvement in the triple murders.

On 9 November 2015, accompanied by her lawyer Vikash Teeluckdharry, Babal Joomun's widow Swaleha Joomun went to the Central CID within Line Barracks to make a new statement to the police against 7 individuals, where she also supplied newspaper cuttings, and a USB drive to the investigators. Swaleha Joomun, who left Mauritius in 2003 with her 3 daughters to resettle in England, thus triggered a third round of investigations 19 years after the incident. In 2000 the "star witness" Khadafi Oozeer alleged that one week prior to the shootings Shakeel Mohamed had a confrontation with Babal Joomun regarding their rival parties' propaganda posters. Oozeer also alleged that, as a result of the confrontation, Shakeel Mohamed had given instructions on using a van during the fatal shootings.

However in December 2015 the Director of Public Prosecutions dropped the charges against Mohamed.

=== Protest against official visit of Yogi Adityanath ===
As a senior representative of the Labour Party in Parliament in October 2017, Shakeel Mohamed vehemently protested in writing to the Prime Minister's Office (PMO) to deny entry to Yogi Adityanath, the BJP Chief Minister of Uttar Pradesh who was chosen by the Government of India to be official guest of the Government of Mauritius at the 183rd anniversary commemoration of the Indian Arrival Day. Shakeel Mohamed criticized Yogi Adityanath's affiliation, claiming that the official guest founded the Hindu Yuva Vahini and would disturb Mauritians' way of life. However, the official visit went ahead.

=== Kidnap and murder of Jean Desveaux Augustin suspicion and disculpation ===
In early March 2023 Shakeel Mohamed was interrogated by Major Crime Investigation Team (MCIT) of the police in connection with the June 2021 assault and murder of ex-footballer, police informer and welder Jean Desveaux Augustin at Karo Kalyptis. A month before his murder, Augustin stole and sold a shipment of drugs which belonged to druglords. 5 main suspects (including Mohammade Yassar Auliar, Shayne Gary Wong Ken, and Jean Eric Baptiste Rasta) were arrested, Wong Ken revealing that the druglords offered Rs 300,000.00 to assault Augustin. Wong Ken contracted Shakeel Mohamed as his defence lawyer, but the MCIT found out that during a meeting at a petrol station in Pamplemousses involving Mohamed, Wong Ken and others, Mohamed had advised his client Wong Ken to modify his version of events by denying any involvement in Augustin's murder. As a result Wong Ken changed his statement by denying any involvement, and by stating that he's making the changes to comply with his lawyer's suggestions. However, Shakeel Mohamed denied that he had given such advice, instead blamed the police and said that he was sitting in the National Assembly at the time when the meeting occurred at the Pamplemousses petrol station.

=== Offensive video during 2024 electoral campaign ===
In October 2024, a few days after the announcement of the November 2024 General Elections Shakeel Mohamed apologised for posting a video on his Facebook social media page, depicting Hindu goddess Durga, alongside bottles of whisky and a pig's head. He declared the video was an attempt to mock members (including a minister) of the ruling MSM government, that made a barbecue at a rave party near a Hindu temple.
