= Fawzi Allymun =

Mauritian politician

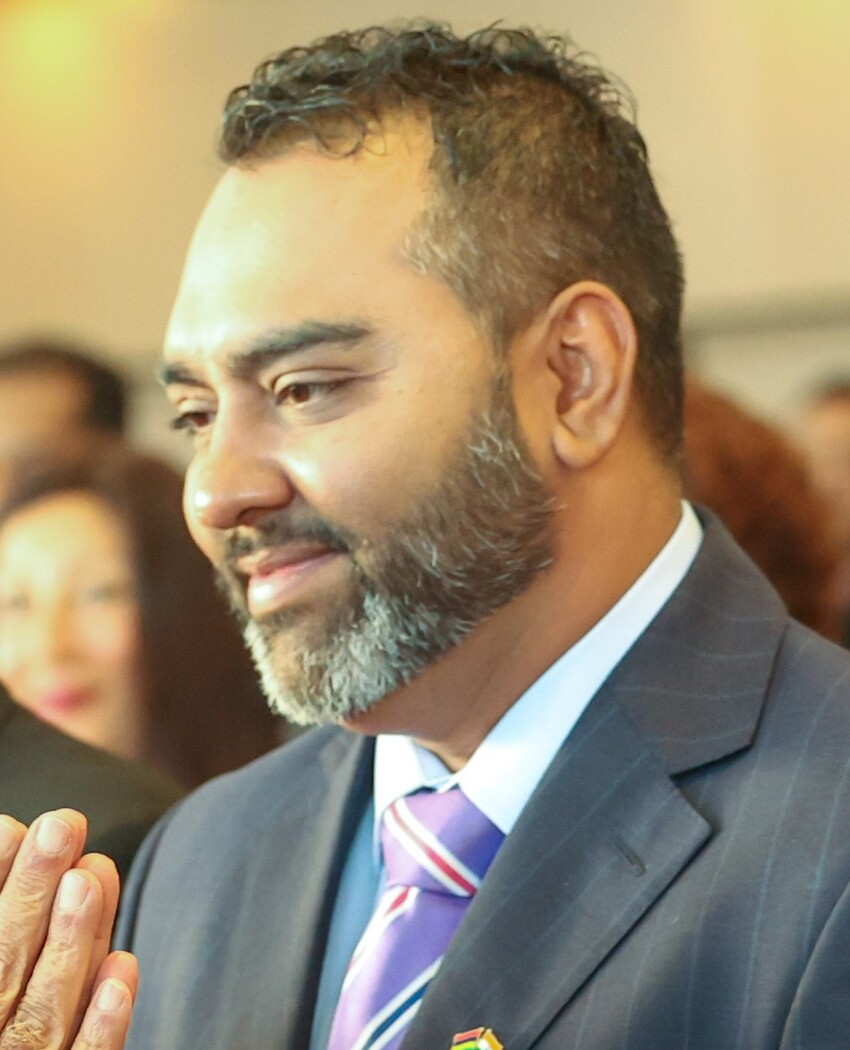
- Fawzi Allymun in 2025

Junior Minister of Local Government
- Incumbent
- Assumed office 22 November 2024

Personal details
- Party: Mauritian Militant Movement

Mohammad Fawzi Allymun is a Mauritian politician from the Mauritian Militant Movement (MMM). He has served as Junior Minister of Local Government in the fourth Navin Ramgoolam cabinet since 2024.
