= Ritish Ramful =

Mauritian politician

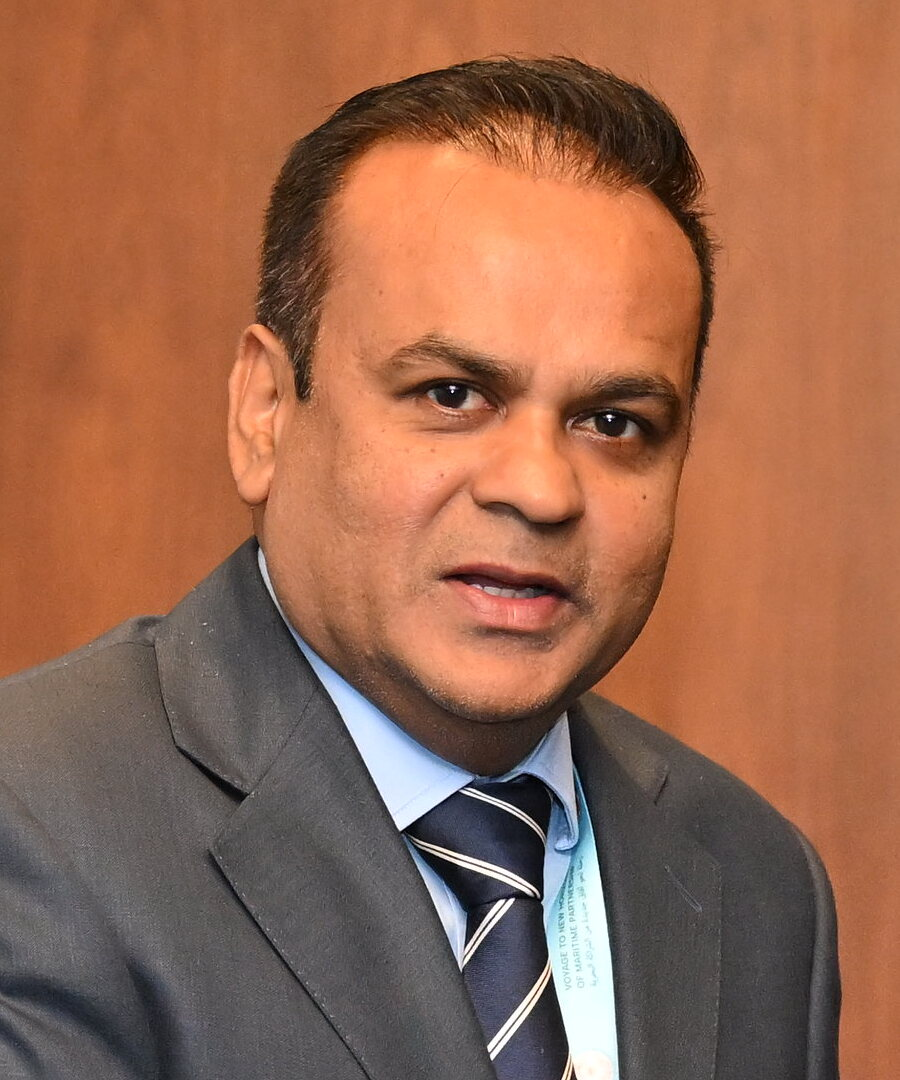
- Ritish Ramful in 2025

Minister of Foreign Affairs, Regional Integration and International Cooperation
- Incumbent
- Assumed office 22 November 2024
- Prime Minister: Navin Ramgoolam
- Preceded by: Maneesh Gobin

Personal details
- Party: Labour Party

Dhananjay (Ritish) Ramful is a Mauritian politician from the Labour Party (PTr). He has served as Minister of Foreign Affairs, Regional Integration and International Cooperation since 2024.
