= Minister of Foreign Affairs (Mauritius) =

Foreign relations cabinet minister of Mauritius

The Minister of Foreign Affairs, Regional Integration and International Trade (French: Ministre des Affaires étrangères, Intégration régionale et Commerce extérieur) is a cabinet minister responsible for conducting foreign relations of Mauritius. The office was established in 1968 after the country gained independence from the United Kingdom, with Prime Minister Sir Seewoosagur Ramgoolam becoming the first Minister responsible for conducting foreign relations.

Holders of the office have been senior figures of parties in the government, yet several ministers have been fired or resigned from the office due to conflicts with the Prime Minister. Arvin Boolell is the only foreign minister to have held the office throughout a complete parliamentary term, from 2010 to 2014.

The office has undergone several name and portfolio changes over time, with the present iteration having additional responsibilities for regional cooperation and international trade. Until the 1990s, the portfolio was referred to in English as Minister of External Affairs.

Since the installation of the new government after the 2024 general election, Ritish Ramful of the Labour Party has held the office after being appointed on 22 November 2024.

== List of foreign ministers ==
The following is a list of foreign ministers of Mauritius since its founding in 1968:

Portrait	Name	Term of office			Portfolio name	Party	Prime minister	Ref.
Portrait	Name	Took office	Left office	Time in office	Portfolio name	Party	Prime minister	Ref.
	Sir Seewoosagur Ramgoolam (1900–1985)	12 March 1968	1 December 1969	1 year, 264 days	External Affairs, Tourism and Emigration	PTr	S. Ramgoolam	
	Gaëtan Duval (1930–1996)	1 December 1969	17 December 1973	4 years, 16 days	External Affairs, Tourism and Emigration	PMSD	S. Ramgoolam	
	Sir Seewoosagur Ramgoolam (1900–1985)	17 December 1973	June; 1976	2 years, 167 days	External Affairs, Tourism and Emigration	PTr	S. Ramgoolam	
	Sir Harold Walter (1920–1992)	June; 1976	15 June 1982	6 years, 14 days	External Affairs, Tourism and Emigration	PTr	S. Ramgoolam	
	Jean-Claude de l'Estrac (born 1948)	15 June 1982	22 March 1983	280 days	External Affairs, Tourism and Emigration	MMM	A. Jugnauth	
	Anil Gayan (born 1948)	28 March 1983	14 January 1986	2 years, 292 days	External Affairs, Tourism and Emigration	MSM	A. Jugnauth	
	Madan Dulloo (born 1949)	14 January 1986	8 August 1986	206 days	External Affairs and Emigration	MSM	A. Jugnauth	
	Sir Satcam Boolell (1920–2006)	8 August 1986	18 August 1990	4 years, 10 days	External Affairs and Emigration	PTr	A. Jugnauth	
	Madan Dulloo (born 1949)	18 August 1990	25 September 1990	38 days	External Affairs and Emigration	MSM	A. Jugnauth	
	Jean-Claude de l'Estrac (born 1948)	25 September 1990	27 September 1991	1 year, 2 days	External Affairs and Emigration	MMM	A. Jugnauth	
	Paul Bérenger (born 1945)	27 September 1991	18 August 1993	1 year, 325 days	External Affairs	MMM	A. Jugnauth	
	Swalay Kasenally (born 1937)	28 August 1993	26 August 1994	363 days	External Affairs	MMM	A. Jugnauth	
	Ramduth Jaddoo (1937–2025)	26 August 1994	22 December 1995	1 year, 118 days	External Affairs	MSM	A. Jugnauth	
	Paul Bérenger (born 1945)	30 December 1995	20 June 1997	1 year, 172 days	Foreign Affairs, International Trade and Regional Cooperation	MMM	N. Ramgoolam	
	Navin Ramgoolam (born 1947)	20 June 1997	2 July 1997	12 days	Foreign Affairs, International Trade and Regional Cooperation	PTr	N. Ramgoolam	
	Kailash Purryag (1947–2025)	2 July 1997	17 September 2000	3 years, 77 days	Foreign Affairs and International Trade	PTr	N. Ramgoolam	
	Anil Gayan (born 1948)	17 September 2000	30 September 2003	3 years, 13 days	Foreign Affairs and Regional Cooperation	MSM	A. Jugnauth	
	Jayen Cuttaree (born 1941)	30 September 2003	5 July 2005	1 year, 278 days	Foreign Affairs, International Trade and Regional Cooperation	MMM	Bérenger	
	Madan Dulloo (born 1949)	7 July 2005	17 March 2008	2 years, 254 days	Foreign Affairs, International Trade and Cooperation	MMSM	N. Ramgoolam	
	Navin Ramgoolam (born 1947); Acting	17 March 2008	13 September 2008	180 days	Foreign Affairs, International Trade and Cooperation	PTr	N. Ramgoolam	
	Arvin Boolell (born 1953)	13 September 2008	13 December 2014	6 years, 91 days	Foreign Affairs, Regional Integration and International Trade	PTr	N. Ramgoolam	
	Étienne Sinatambou (born 1963)	15 December 2014	14 March 2016	1 year, 92 days	Foreign Affairs, Regional Integration and International Trade	MSM	A. Jugnauth	
	Vishnu Lutchmeenaraidoo (born 1944)	14 March 2016	21 March 2019	3 years, 7 days	Foreign Affairs, Regional Integration and International Trade	MSM	A. Jugnauth	
	Vishnu Lutchmeenaraidoo (born 1944)	14 March 2016	21 March 2019	3 years, 7 days	Foreign Affairs, Regional Integration and International Trade	MSM	P. Jugnauth	
	Nando Bodha (born 1954)	22 March 2019	6 February 2021	1 year, 321 days	Foreign Affairs, Regional Integration and International Trade	MSM	P. Jugnauth	
	Alan Ganoo (born 1954)	6 February 2021	30 August 2023	2 years, 205 days	Foreign Affairs, Regional Integration and International Trade	MPM	P. Jugnauth	
	Maneesh Gobin (born 1975)	30 August 2023	12 November 2024	1 year, 74 days	Foreign Affairs, Regional Integration and International Trade	MSM	P. Jugnauth	
	Ritish Ramful	22 November 2024	Incumbent	1 year, 343 days	Foreign Affairs, Regional Integration and International Trade	PTr	N. Ramgoolam	
