= Anil Gayan =

Mauritian politician

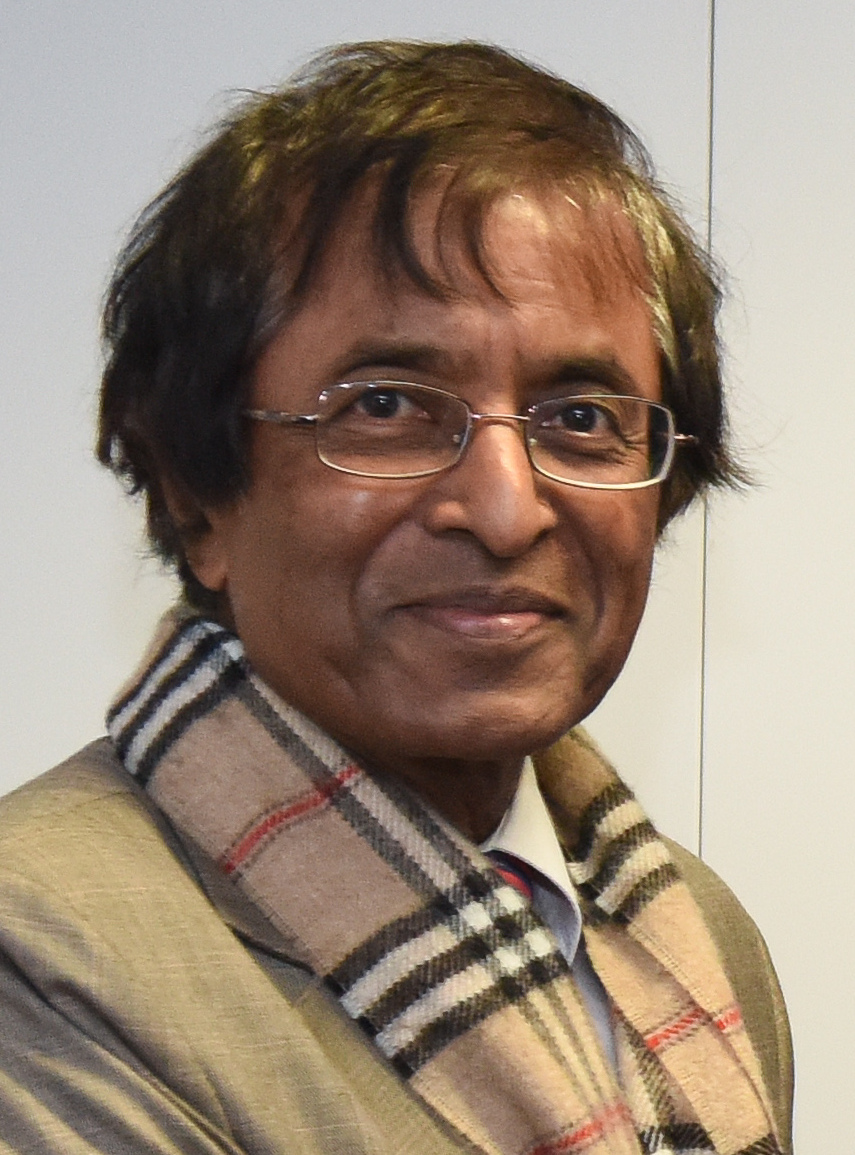
Gayan in 2015

Anil Kumarsingh Gayan (born 22 October 1948 in Triolet, Mauritius) is a Mauritian politician and lawyer.

== Early life, education and marriage ==
Anil Gayan's ancestors migrated from India when the island was a British colony. He is the son of Socile Boolell (Sir Satcam Boolell's sister) and bus driver Deokaran Gayan. Gayan completed his secondary education at Royal College Port Louis and was awarded a scholarship in 1968 to study in England as a "laureate". He studied law at the London School of Economics and University of London until 1974.

Gayan married Sooryakanti Nirsimloo, an academic of the MGI, whose younger sister is writer Ananda Devi Nirsimloo-Anenden.

== Political career ==
He was the foreign minister of Mauritius from 1983 until 1986 and from September 2000 until a cabinet reshuffle in December 2003.

In 2009, he formed a new group called FNM (Front National Mauricien) in preparation for the by-elections during which he challenged rival cousins Pravind Jugnauth and Ashock Jugnauth. FNM had activist Atma Doolooa as deputy leader, barrister Ashley Hurrunghee as president, and comedian Hassen Rojoa as general secretary. However, Gayan was defeated at the Constituency No.8 by-elections when the FNM participated in such events.

Gayan later joined the Muvman Liberater (a splinter group of the MMM) and was elected in the 2014 general elections in Constituency No. 20 (Beau Bassin-Petite Rivière). He was part of Cabinet as Minister of Health (2014-2017) and then as Minister of Tourism (2017-2019).

== Legal career ==
In 1974, Gayan joined the Attorney General’s Chambers as Crown Counsel. Since 1995 Gayan has been a Senior Counsel.

In 2008, he was part of United Nations mediation in Guinea-Bissau. Gayan led a 20-member African Union group of observers during the 2010 Rwanda elections.

== Controversies ==
=== Vijaya Sumputh scandal ===
In 2004 Gayan's mistress and political activist Vijaya Sumputh was nominated as director of the Tourism Authority when Anil Gayan was Minister of Tourism. In 2012, Gayan and Sumputh jointly registered Southall Company Limited to offer management consultancy services. In 2013, Gayan and Sumputh created Lex Advoc Associates Company Limited to offer real estate consultancy services. When Gayan became Minister of Health under the MSM government, his former Campaign Manager Vijaya Sumputh was appointed as head of the Cardiac Center or Trust Fund for Specialised Medical Care in 2015 without going through a recruitment process, and boosted her monthly salary by an extra Rs 100,000 to Rs 323,000 as revealed in the National Assembly in 2017 by Anwar Husnoo, Gayan's successor. This led to Vijaya Sumputh's resignation by 31 March 2017. A Fact-Finding committee, headed by former ICAC director Luchmeeparsad Aujayeb, was instigated but Paul Bérenger reported in November 2017 that the committee's report has been forgotten.

=== Disclosure of salaries of La Sentinelle employees ===
In May 2016 Gayan sent a "Freedom of Information" email to La Sentinelle, publisher of the daily L'Express to request the newspaper to provide information about the salary of its staff, after L'Express reported on the hearing in front of the Equal Opportunities Tribunal of Vijaya Sumputh's controversial appointment at the Cardiac Centre without going through a fair recruitment process and her unusually high salary increase. Nad Sivaramen of La Sentinelle replied by reminding Gayan that the newspaper is a private entity, and is thus not obliged to reveal any such information. Sivaramen disclosed his own salary and reminded Gayan that the government was failing to deliver on its electoral promises that it would be transparent.

=== Rise of synthetic drugs ===
In June 2016 several Non-Governmental Organizations were concerned about the increase in usage of synthetic drugs in Mauritius while Gayan belittled their concerns, stating that the situation was not alarming at a hearing of the Commission of Enquiry on Drug Trafficking presided by former judge Paul Lam Shang Leen. Gayan further opined that cannabis is so much more dangerous and addictive than alcohol that it should never be legalised.
