= Rajesh Bhagwan =

Minister of the Environment 2024

The Honourable Rajesh Bhagwan GCSK
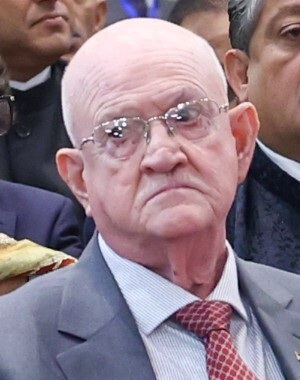
- Bhagwan in 2025

Minister of Environment, Solid Waste Management and Climate Change Environment and NDU (2003–2005) Environment (1996–1997; 2000–2003)
- Incumbent
- Assumed office 22 November 2024
- Prime Minister: Navin Ramgoolam
- Preceded by: Kavy Ramano
- In office 17 September 2000 – 5 July 2005
- Prime Minister: Anerood Jugnauth; Paul Bérenger
- Preceded by: James Burty David
- Succeeded by: Anil Bachoo
- In office 30 November 1996 – 21 June 1997
- Prime Minister: Navin Ramgoolam
- Succeeded by: James Burty David

Minister of Local Government
- In office 30 December 1995 – 30 November 1996
- Prime Minister: Navin Ramgoolam
- Preceded by: Mathieu Laclé
- Succeeded by: Deva Virahsawmy (Local Government and Public Utilities)

Member of Parliament; for Beau Bassin and Petite Rivière
- Incumbent
- Assumed office 21 August 1983
- Preceded by: Finlay Salesse

Personal details
- Born: British Mauritius
- Party: Mauritian Militant Movement
- Spouse: Asha Bhagwan
- Children: 3
- Occupation: Meter reader

Rajesh Anand Bhagwan is a Mauritian politician. He currently serves as Minister of Environment, Solid Waste Management and Climate Change since November 2024 under Navin Ramgoolam's fourth government. Bhagwan has previously held the same ministry between 1996 to 1997 and 2000 to 2005 albeit under modified portfolio titles.

Serving as a member of the National Assembly of Mauritius for the Mauritian Militant Movement, Bhagwan holds the current record for having been elected to the assembly continuously since 1983 and is the second longest-serving MP after his former party leader, Paul Bérenger. An MP for the constituency of Beau Bassin and Petite Rivière, he has not lost reelection for the same constituency since contesting it for the first time in 1983.

Well-known for his outspokenness and one-liners, Bhagwan is also known as the "Bulldozer" and many of his remarks in the National Assembly have resulted in his suspension or expulsion from the chamber on several occasions.

== Early life and career ==
Bhagwan was born to parents who originated from Gujarat in India. His father was a jeweler whilst his mother was a homemaker. He is also related to Sir Harilal Vaghjee, the first Mauritian speaker of parliament, being his uncle.

He completed his secondary education in Beau Bassin-Rose Hill and afterwards, Bhagwan joined the Central Electricity Board (CEB) as a meter reader. Later on, he moved into administrative roles.

== Political career ==
Bhagwan's first political experience was in the municipal elections held in 1982, where he was a candidate for the Mauritian Militant Movement (MMM) and was duly elected. Less than a year later, he ran as a candidate for the constituency of Beau Bassin and Petite Rivière for the general election held in August 1983. Bhagwan has since been reelected at every general election held thereafter, becoming the second-longest sitting member of the National Assembly after MMM leader Paul Bérenger.

In 1995, Bhagwan was appointed as minister for the first time under Navin Ramgoolam's government. He became Minister of Local Government which he held until November 1996. After a reshuffle, Bhagwan took over the environment ministry. Following the departure of the MMM from Ramgoolam's government, he and the remaining ministers from the MMM resigned in June 1997.

After the victory of the MSM/MMM alliance in 2000, Bhagwan became environment minister once again under Anerood Jugnauth's government. He was given additional responsibility for the National Development Unit when Paul Bérenger became prime minister in 2003. He remained in his post until the alliance lost the general election in 2005.

In 2019, he ran for reelection once more under the same constituency. As secretary general of the MMM, Bhagwan emphasised that the party would run alone in the election even though members of the MMM were leaving in numbers before election day. Being known for his outspoken remarks, Bhagwan commented that those who opposed the decision of the party to go alone in the election should 'drink Lysol'. On election day, Bhagwan was reelected for the ninth consecutive time along with two other MMM MPs, Karen Foo Kune and Franco Quirin. The party had taken all three seats of Beau Bassin and Petite Rivière.

After the victory of Alliance du Changement in the 2024 general election, Bhagwan was reelected for the tenth consecutive time, along with MMM incumbent MPs Karen Foo Kune and Franco Quirin, in the same constituency. He returned to government and was sworn in as Minister of Environment, Solid Waste Management and Climate Change as part of the government led by Navin Ramgoolam and Paul Bérenger.

Bhagwan is currently the secretary general of the Mauritian Militant Movement.

== Personal life ==
Bhagwan is married to Asha Bhagwan and has three daughters, one namely Bhavna Bhagwan, who is presently a Senior State Counsel.

Due to stress, Bhagwan has developed vitiligo, a skin condition that causes loss of skin colour. In August 2021, he was mocked by the speaker of the National Assembly, Sooroojdev Phokeer, for his appearance by remarking "Look at your face". Phokeer denied making the remark towards his skin condition.
