= Arvin Boolell =

Minister of Agro-Industry 2024

The Honourable Arvin Boolell GOSK MP
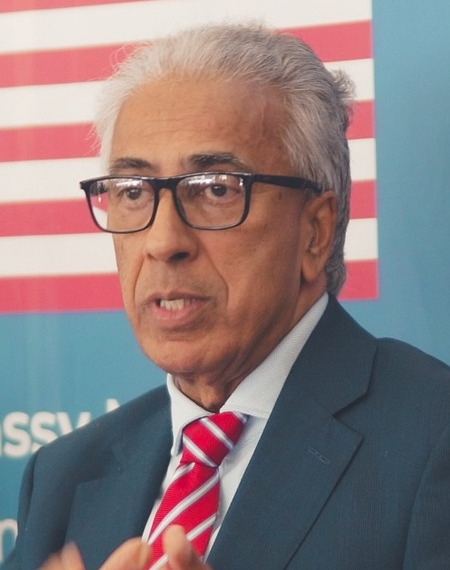
- Boolell in 2025

Minister of Agro-Industry, Food Security, Blue Economy and Fisheries
- Incumbent
- Assumed office 22 November 2024
- Prime Minister: Navin Ramgoolam
- Preceded by: Mahen Seeruttun

Leader of Opposition
- In office 28 May 2024 – 12 November 2024
- President: Prithvirajsing Roopun
- Prime Minister: Pravind Jugnauth
- Preceded by: Shakeel Mohamed
- Succeeded by: Joe Lesjongard
- In office 14 November 2019 – 1 March 2021
- President: Barlen Vyapoory (acting); Eddy Balancy (acting); Prithvirajsing Roopun
- Prime Minister: Pravind Jugnauth
- Preceded by: Xavier-Luc Duval
- Succeeded by: Xavier-Luc Duval

Minister of Foreign Affairs, Regional Integration and International Trade
- In office 8 September 2008 – 12 December 2014
- Prime Minister: Navin Ramgoolam
- Preceded by: Madan Dulloo
- Succeeded by: Étienne Sinatambou

Member of Parliament for Belle Rose and Quatre-Bornes
- Incumbent
- Assumed office 17 December 2017
- Preceded by: Roshi Bhadain
- Majority: 7990 (35%)

Member of Parliament for Vieux Grand Port and Rose Belle
- In office 30 August 1987 – 10 December 2014
- Preceded by: Anandisswar Choolun
- Succeeded by: Mahen Seerutun

Personal details
- Born: 26 May 1953 (age 72) Port Louis, British Mauritius
- Party: Labour Party
- Occupation: Physician

Arvin Boolell (Bhojpuri : आर्विन बूलेल; May 26, 1953) is a Mauritian doctor and politician currently serving as Minister of Agro-Industry, Food Security, Blue Economy and Fisheries. Boolell formerly served as the Leader of the Opposition from 2019 to 2021 and again briefly in 2024.

== Early life ==
Boolell, who was born in an Arya Samajist Indo Mauritian family in Port Louis, is the son of former leader of the Labour Party and former Deputy Prime Minister, Sir Satcam Boolell. His younger brother Satyajit Boolell (also known as Ajit Boolell) became the Director of Public Prosecutions in 2009. He is also former minister Anil Gayan's cousin. Writer, active politician and retired forensics doctor Satish Boolell who was elected Member of Parliament is also his cousin.

He attended secondary school St Mary's College in Rose Hill and then studied medicine in England and Wales. After graduating and becoming a medical practitioner, he graduated with an LLM from the National University of Ireland. He then practiced for sometimes in Wales before coming back to the country.

== Political life ==
He was elected to the Legislative Assembly for the first time in 1987 in Constituency No 11, Vieux Grand Port and Rose Belle. He has been elected at Constituency No. 11 at all general elections (1987, 1991, 1995, 2000, 2005, 2010) until 2014. Arvin Boolell was Opposition Whip from 2000 to 2005.

Boolell has served as Minister of Agriculture (later known as Minister of Agro-Industry) from 2005 to 2008. He was involved in negotiations with the European Union over economic issues. Following the cabinet reshuffling of 2008, he became Minister of Foreign Affairs where he remained until 2014.

Following a Labour Party executive committee meeting on 12 May 2015 Arvin Boolell resigned as Labour Party Spokesperson after being verbally abused by backers of Navin Ramgoolam who refused to step down as leader of the party despite having lost the 2014 general elections.

At the 2017 by-elections in Constituency No. 18 (Belle Rose and Quatre Bornes) Arvin Boolell was elected and became member of the national assembly. At the 2019 General Elections he was again elected in Constituency no. 18. Since the Labour Party leader Navin Ramgoolam was not elected as member of parliament, the party chose Arvin Boolell to be its parliamentary leader and being the opposition party with most seats, he became the Leader of the Opposition. He is also the Vice Chairman of Mauritius Labour Party.

== Recognition ==
In 2011 Arvin Boolell was elevated to the rank of Grand Officer of the Order of the Star and Key of Indian Ocean (G.O.S.K.).

== Controversies ==
During his term in office as Minister of Foreign Affairs there were international press reports that in 2012 Arvin Boolell sold the island of Agaléga to India as part of a deal to prevent the cancellation of the 1983 Double Taxation Avoidance Agreement (Treaty) which is an essential part of the island's Offshore Banking sector. The sale of Agaléga would also enable India to build a military base on the island, which is now evidenced in the heavy build-up of military infrastructure in Agaléga. Details of the deal have not been revealed to the public, although the subsea surveys of the waters of Agalega have confirmed the presence of gigantic oil and gas reserves.
