= Joe Lesjongard =

Mauritian politician

The Honourable Joe Lesjongard
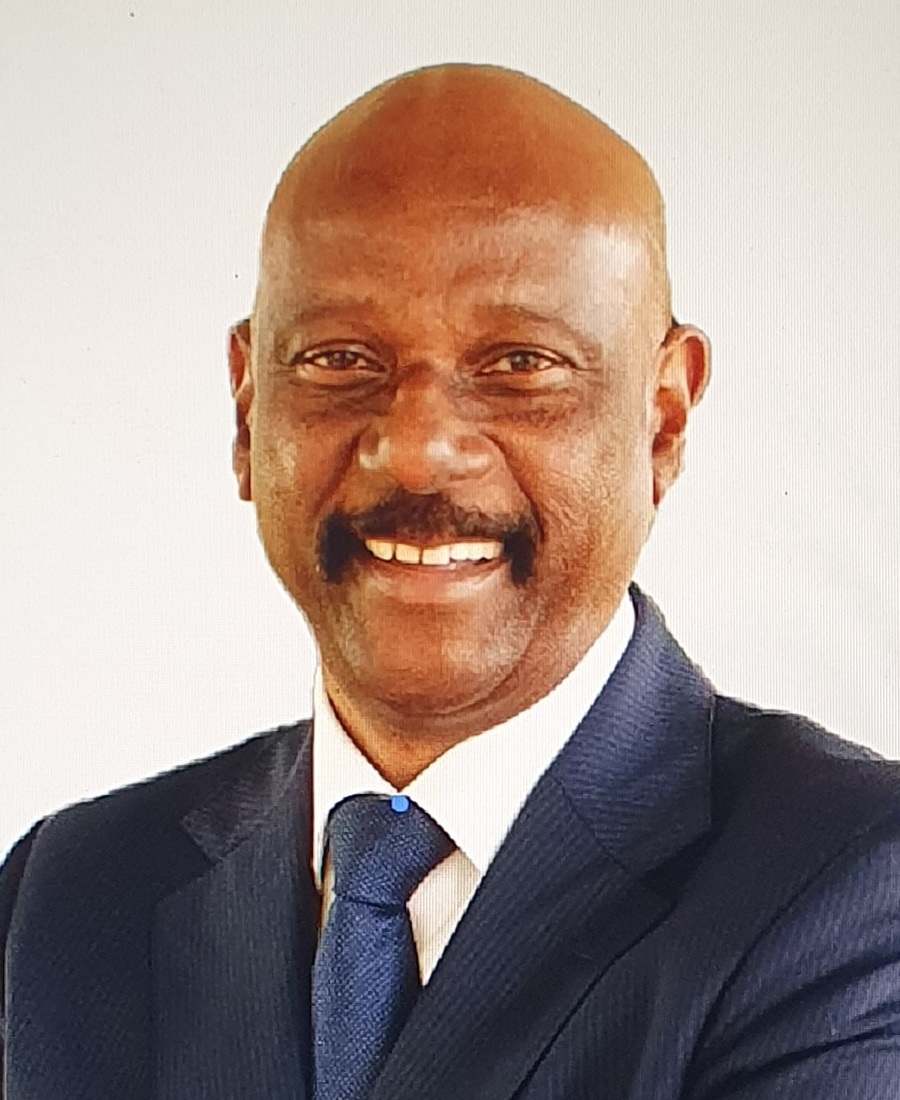

Nominated MP; for No.4 Port Louis North and Montagne Longue Best Loser
- Incumbent
- Assumed office 15 November 2024
- Prime Minister: Navin Ramgoolam

Leader of the Opposition
- In office 15 November 2024 – 6 August 2026
- Prime Minister: Navin Ramgoolam
- Preceded by: Arvin Boolell
- Succeeded by: Chetan Baboolall

President of the Militant Socialist Movement
- Incumbent
- Assumed office September 2020

Minister of Energy and Public Utilities
- In office 25 June 2020 – 4 October 2024

Minister of Energy and Public Utilities
- In office 12 November 2019 – 24 June 2020
- Succeeded by: Steven Obeegadoo

Member of Parliament MMM & M.Pa; for Constituency No.14 Savanne Riviere Noire
- In office 2014–2019

Member of Parliament MMM; for Constituency No.4 Port Louis North Montage Longue
- In office 2010–2014

Member of Parliament MSM MMM; for Constituency No.4 Port Louis North Montage Longue
- In office 2005–2010

Member of Parliament MSM; for Constituency No.4 Port Louis North Montage Longue
- In office 2000–2005

Personal details
- Born: 29 December 1958 (age 67) British Mauritius
- Party: MSM 1989-2009, 2017-now MMM 2010-2015; M. Patriotique 2015-2016
- Occupation: Engineer

Georges Pierre Lesjongard (born 29 December 1958), also known as Joe Lesjongard is a Mauritian engineer, politician, and currently holding one of Best Loser seats in the National Assembly. He served as leader of the opposition from 2024 until he was replaced by Chetan Baboolall in August 2026.

== Political career ==
In 1989 Joe Lesjongard joined the MSM under the leadership of Sir Anerood Jugnauth. He was very active in 1996 and 1997 in Constituency No.12 Mahebourg Plaine Magnien. But it is in Constituency No.4 Port Louis North Montage Longue that he received the MSM's investiture to be a candidate of MSM-MMM coalition at the 2000 General Elections. He was elected in third position. By 2003 he was made Minister of Local Government. He also held the title of Minister of Housing and Land, as well as Minister of Small to Medium Enterprises until 2005. At the 2005 General Elections he was again a candidate of the MSM in Constituency No.4, and was elected in second position. He was also nominated as the President of the MSM.

From 2005 onwards as the MSM was contemplating an alliance with the Labour Party, Lesjongard started to distance himself from the MSM. In 2009 he left the MSM and did not celebrate Pravind Jugnauth's victory at the by-elections in Constituency No.8 Moka Quartier Militaire. He sat in the National Assembly as an independent back-bencher before joining the MMM as Paul Bérenger praised his performance as minister between 2003 and 2005. But despite Lesjongard's frequent clashes with another MMM Constituency No.4 politician, Pradeep Jeeha, he was still able to secure Paul Bérenger's support, thus receiving the MMM's investiture at the 2010 General Elections. Lesjongard was elected as a candidate of the MMM-UN-MMSD coalition, where as Jeeha was defeated.

By 2014 Paul Bérenger had to intervene again to diffuse tensions between Jeeha and Lesjongard, and this time he transferred Lesjongard's investiture to Constituency No.14 Savanne Riviere Noire, while Jeeha's investiture was moved to Constituency No.16. Lesjongard was elected under the banner of the Labour-MMM coalition in second position. However, less than a year later in 2015, Lesjongard resigned from the MMM to form a new party Mouvement Patriotique (MP) with other dissidents. In June 2016 he stepped down from this position as Secretary General of the MP without quitting the party. He returned to the MSM in 2017, and was nominated Deputy Speaker in 2018.

At the 2019 General Elections he was elected at the top of the list in his favourite Constituency No.4. He held the portfolio of Minister of Public Utilities until the 2024 General Elections. He was nominated as one the four Best Losers at the 2024 elections, thereby becoming the only member of the MSM to secure a seat in the National Assembly from December 2024 onwards.
