= Richard Duval =

Mauritian politician (born 1968)

The Honourable Christian Harold Richard Duval
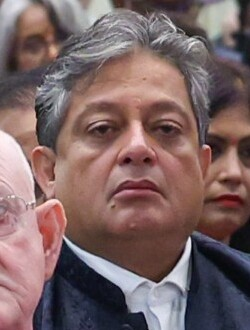
- Duval in 2025

Minister of Tourism
- Incumbent
- Assumed office 29 November 2024
- President: Prithvirajsing Roopun; Dharam Gokhool
- Prime Minister: Navin Ramgoolam

Member of Parliament for Mahebourg & Plaine Magnien
- In office 7 November 2019 – 10 November 2024
- President: Prithvirajsing Roopun
- Prime Minister: Pravind Jugnauth

Member of Parliament for Mahebourg & Plaine Magnien & PPS
- In office 5 July 2005 – 5 May 2010
- President: Sir Anerood Jugnauth
- Prime Minister: Navin Ramgoolam

Personal details
- Born: 4 March 1968 (age 58) Souillac, Mauritius
- Party: New Democrats (Mauritius) PMSD; PMXD
- Relations: Hervé Duval (uncle); Xavier-Luc Duval (cousin and adoptive brother); Adrien Duval (nephew)
- Parents: Jacqueline Dalais (mother); Gaëtan Duval (adoptive father); Guy Duval (biological father)
- Occupation: Horse Trainer

Christian Harold Richard Duval (born 04 March 1968) is a Mauritian politician and former Private Parliamentary Secretary (PPS).

== Early life, education and career ==
Richard Duval grew up with his mother Jacqueline Dalais in southern Mauritius. Following the death of his biological father Guy Duval, Richard was adopted by his uncle and politician Sir Gaëtan Duval.

Following his secondary education at St. Joseph's College in Curepipe he travelled to France where he learned how to train horses under Robert Collet's guidance. Given his familiarity with the Mauritius Turf Club he opened a new stable called Écurie Richard Duval in July 1994 soon after his return to Mauritius. However the stable closed down within a few years.

== Political career ==
Following his resignation as a member of the ailing PMSD to join his step-brother's new party PMXD, Richard Duval's political career started in July 2005 when he was elected to the National Assembly in Constituency No. 12 (Mahébourg-Plaine-Magnien) as a candidate of Alliance Sociale (coalition of Labour PTr–PMXD–VF–MR–MMSM). His running mates Yatin Varma and Vasant Bunwaree were also elected in the same constituency during these elections. Richard Duval served as Private Parliamentary Secretary (PPS) until 2010.

For the 2010 General Elections Richard Duval did not receive the support of any major political party due to his involvement in the 2008 Subutex scandal during which Duval's associate Cindy Legallant was caught at SSR International Airport for illegal importation and trafficking of Rs 23 Millions' worth of Subutex tablets from Paris.

Moreover, he had dim prospects of securing a party's investiture for the 2014 General Elections due to the 2011 Casse Bribery scandal, and 2013 Pailles drink driving scandal which made news headlines in the Mauritian press.

At the November 2019 elections Richard Duval was a candidate of L'Alliance Nationale, a coalition of PMSD and Labour Party (PTr) in Constituency No. 12 where he was not elected. However he secured a seat as Best Loser in the National Assembly.

In 2024, Richard Duval left the PMSD along with other 2 members to form a new political party, Nouveaux Démocrats (ND). His newly formed party thus joined the Alliance du Changement for the elections of the same year.

== Scandals ==
=== 2008 Legallant and illegal importation of Subutex ===
In July 2008 Cindy Legallant was arrested on arriving in Mauritius with Rs 21 million worth of the drug Subutex (buprenorphine) in her suitcase, hidden amongst baby products. She and Duval had travelled in the same airplane. Then-PMSD parliamentary private secretary (PPS) Richard Duval had requested the Prime Minister's Office on 29 April 2008 to provide special access to nutritionist Cindy Legallant to La Terrasse, an exclusive VIP lounge at the island's airport. Duval refused to resign from Parliament despite the public requests of PMSD's president Maurice Allet. In 2013, Cindy Legallant was arrested and prosecuted for money laundering associated with the illegal trade of Subutex.

=== 2011 bribery case (Casse family and Tourism Authority) ===
In 2011 the ICAC initiated a bribery investigation against Richard Duval after a businessman reported PMSD activist Francis Casse, his sister Anne Casse and Richard Duval for promising a Tourism Authority permit to operate pleasure boats in exchange for a bribe of Rs 100,000.00. ICAC investigators found out that Duval, Francis Casse and Anne Casse had developed a scheme through which they acted as "facilitators" for the prized permits. Richard Duval's half-brother Xavier-Luc Duval had been minister of tourism and the Tourism Authority fell under his jurisdiction for a number of years.

=== 2013 Pailles road accident and drink driving ===
Richard Duval refused to undergo a breath-test, blood test and urine test after being involved in a road accident on 21 July 2013 during which he lost control of his BMW on his way to Moka when going around a bend near Mauvilac's yard at Pailles. He was thus charged with 2 offences, namely driving without due care and attention as well as failing to provide a specimen of the breath for a breath test. Instead Richard Duval chose to blame a white Subaru WRX, his childhood asthma, and consumption of cough syrup Benylin as causes of his accident and for his refusal to comply with policemen's request for testing. In February 2014 Richard Duval, then president of the State Property Development Company failed to appear in Court for the scheduled hearing, as he had instead chosen to fly to South Africa. In August 2014 an internal audit revealed that Richard Duval's case file had mysteriously disappeared.

=== 2015 Forbach hit-and-run fatal accident ===
On 19 September 2015 Arvind and Manisha Shamloll were killed when travelling from their home in Laventure to their workplace in Grand Baie, when their blue motorcycle was impacted by a black Kia SUV belonging to Richard Duval. Eye witnesses described that Duval's black SUV and another blue car were speeding and overtaking other vehicles just before the fatal crash, and that after the impact with Duval's Kia SUV, Arvind and Manisha Shamloll became airborne before being hit a second time by the blue car. Duval's vehicle was later found in a sugar cane field near the location of the deadly crash.
