= New Democrats (Mauritius) =

Political party in Mauritius

New Democrats Nouveaux Démocrates Nouvo Demokrat
- Abbreviation: ND
- Leader: Khushal Lobine
- President: Ayushi Adarshini Balluck - Interim President
- General Secretary: Zapheer Futloo
- Spokesperson: Julien Permal
- Founded: 18 April 2024
- Split from: PMSD
- Headquarters: Bonne Terre, Vacoas
- Ideology: Ecological politics Big tent
- Political position: Centre
- National affiliation: Alliance du Changement (since 2024)
- Colours: Blue; Red; White
- National Assembly: 3 / 66

Website
- nouveauxdemocrates.com

The New Democrats (ND; French: Nouveaux Démocrates; Morisyen: Nouvo Demokrat) is a political party in Mauritius founded on 18 April 2024 as a splinter group from the established PMSD.

== L'alliance du changement coalition ==
For the 2024 Mauritius General Elections, the party has aligned with the Alliance du Changement coalition, which also includes the Labour Party (Mauritius), the Mauritian Militant Movement, and the Rezistans ek Alternativ.

== Election results ==
=== Legislative elections ===
Election	Leader	Coalition	Votes	%	Seats	+/–	Position	Status
2024	Khushal Lobine	ND–PTR–MMM–ReA	84,960	3.63	3 / 60	New	▲3rd	Coalition
