= List of political parties in Mauritius =

This article lists Mauritius political parties in alphabetical order. Mauritius has a multi-party system with numerous political parties, in which no single party usually has a chance of gaining power alone, and parties must work with each other to form coalition governments.

== Active parties ==
=== Parties represented in the National Assembly of Mauritius (since 2024) ===
Alliance	Party		Leader	Political position	Ideology	Seats
AdC	PTr	Labour Party; Parti travailliste	Navin Ramgoolam	Centre-left	Social democracy	35 / 66
AdC	MMM	Mauritian Militant Movement; Mouvement Militant Mauricien	Vacant	Left-wing	Democratic socialism	15 / 66
AdC	ND	New Democrats; Nouveaux Démocrates	Khushal Lobine	Centre	Ecological politics	3 / 66
AdC	ReA	Resistance and Alternatives; Rezistans ek Alternativ	Ashok Subron	Left-wing	Eco-socialism	3 / 66
—N/a	OPR	Rodrigues People's Organisation; Organisation du Peuple Rodriguais	Francisco François	Left-wing	Autonomism	2 / 66
—N/a	AL	Alliance Liberation	Dianette Manan-Henriette	Left-wing	Rodrigues interests	2 / 66
Lepep	MSM	Militant Socialist Movement; Mouvement Socialiste Militant	Pravind Jugnauth	Centre-left	Social democracy	1 / 66
Lepep	PMSD	Mauritian Social Democratic Party; Parti Mauricien Social Démocrate	Xavier-Luc Duval	Centre-right to right-wing	Conservatism; Francophilia	1 / 66
—N/a	Independent					4 / 66

=== Parties represented in the National Assembly of Mauritius (until 2024) ===
Alliance	Name	Abbr.	Leader	Political position	Ideology	MPs	
Mauritian; Alliance	Militant Socialist Movement; Mouvement Socialiste Militant	MSM	Pravind Jugnauth	Centre-left	Social democracy	36 / 70	42 / 70
Mauritian; Alliance	Muvman Liberater	ML	Ivan Collendavelloo	Left-wing	Democratic socialism	3 / 70	42 / 70
Mauritian; Alliance	Muvman Patriot Morisien	MPM	Alan Ganoo			2 / 70	42 / 70
Mauritian; Alliance	Militant Platform; Plateforme Militante	PM	Steven Obeegadoo	Centre-left	Participatory democracy Social democracy	1 / 70	42 / 70
National; Alliance	Labour Party; Parti Travailliste	PTr	Navin Ramgoolam	Centre-left	Social democracy	12 / 70	16 / 70
National; Alliance	Mauritian Social Democratic Party; Parti Mauricien Social Démocrate	PMSD	Xavier-Luc Duval	Centre-right to right-wing	Conservatism; Francophilia	4 / 70	16 / 70
None	Mauritian Militant Movement; Mouvement Militant Mauricien	MMM	Paul Bérenger	Left-wing	Democratic socialism	9 / 70	
None	Rodrigues People's Organisation; Organisation du Peuple Rodriguais	OPR	Serge Clair	Left-wing	Autonomism	2 / 70	

=== Parties without representation ===
Name	Abbr.	Leader	Actual alliance
Comité D’Action Musulman Mauricien	CAMM	Jauhan	None
Reform Party	RP	Roshi Bhadain	Linion Reform
Front Solidarité Mauricien	FSM	Cehl Meeah	None
Azir Moris		Jameel Peerally	None
Ensam Nou Kapav		Roshni Mooneeram	None
Lalit			None
Les Verts Fraternels	VF	Sylvio Michel	None
Ralliement citoyen pour la patrie	RCP	Parvez Dookhy	None
The Four Cats		Lallmohammed Ramjan	None
Mauritius New Generation Forces	MNGF	Ahmedally Janoo	None
Mouvement Authentique Mauricien	MAM	Eliézer François	None
Mouvement Mauricien Sociale Démocrate	MMSD	Eric Guimbeau	None
The Liberals		Maharajah Madhewoo	None
Parti Kreol Morisien		Edley Bergue	None
Parti Justice Sociale		Sheila Bunwaree	None
Parti Malin		Danrajsingh Aubeeluck	None
Parti Militan Travayer	PMT	Jack Bizlall	None
Rezistans ek Alternativ	REA	Ashok Subron	alliance du changement

== Defunct and merged parties ==
Name	Abbr.	Leader	Founded	Dissolved
Action Libérale (Liberal Democratic Party)	AL	Eugène Laurent, Anatole de Boucherville, Edouard Nairac	1907	
All Mauritius Hindu Congress (Hindu Congress)	AMHC	Ramlochun Nath Varma	1965	
Comité d'Action Musulman	CAM	Abdool Razack Mohamed	1959	
Comité d'Action Mauricien	CAM II	Shakeel Mohamed	2000	
Democrat Party	DP	Onésipho Beaugard, Célicourt Antelme	1885	
English Party	EP	Group of Protestants sponsored by Dalton Clifford Lloyd to oppose J.P. Hennessy	1885	
Front National Mauricien	FNM	Anil Gayan, Atma Doolooa, Hassen Rojoa, Prakash Bheeroo, Ashley Hurrunghee, Vassen Kuppaymootoo	2009	
Front des Travailleurs Socialiste	FTS	Sylvio Michel	1985	
Groupement Curepipiens (Anti-PMSD)	GC	Edley Bergue	1982	
Independent Forward Bloc	IFB	Sookdeo Bissoondoyal	1958	
Jan Andolan	JA	Basdeo Bissoondoyal	1939	
L'Entente Mauricienne	LEM	Jerôme Tranquille	1931	
Mouvement Militant Mauricien Socialiste Progressiste	MMMSP	Dev Virahsawmy	1973	
Mouvement Militant Socialiste Mauricien	MMSM	Madan Dulloo	1995	
Mouvement Patriotique Mauricien	MPM	Satcam Boolell	1982	
Mouvement Républicain	MR	Rama Valayden	1996	
Mouvement Socialiste Démocrate	MSD	Anil Bachoo	2005	
Mouvement Travailliste Démocrate	MTD	Anil Bachoo	1987	
Mouvement Travailleur Mauricien	MTM	Atma Doolooa	2006	
National Socialist Workers Party	NSWP	Dr. Maurice Curé	August 1967	
Parti Action Liberal	PAL	Lutchmeeparsadsing Ramsahok	1991	
Parti de l'Ordre (Oligarchy Party)	PDO	Henri Leclézio	1890	
Parti Gaëtan Duval	PGD	Gaëtan Duval	1998	
Parti Islamique Mauricien	PIM	Yousuf Abdul Razack Mohamed	1982	
Parti Mauricien Xavier-Luc Duval	PMXD	Xavier-Luc Duval	1998	2009
Parti du Peuple Mauricien	PPM	Anirood Gajadhur	1982	
Parti Socialiste	PS	Anil Gayan	1990	
Parti Socialiste Mauricien	PSM	Harish Boodhoo	1979	1983
Parti Socialiste Progressiste	PSP	Oumashunker Hawoldar	1976	
Reformist Party	RP	William Newton	1885	
Ralliement Mauricien	RM	Jules Koenig	1953	1965
Renouveau Militant Mauricien	RMM	Prem Nababsing, Jean Claude de l'Estrac	1994	
Retrocessionist Party	RP	Edouard Laurent	1911	
Rassemblement Pour la Réforme	RPR	Sheila Bappoo, Rama Sithanen, Alain Laridon	1996	
Rassemblement des Travaillistes Mauricien	RTM	Beergoonath Ghurburrun	1984	
Union Démocratique Mauricienne	UDM	Maurice Lesage, Guy Ollivry	1969	
Union Mauricienne	UM	Jean-Michel de Senneville	1998	
Union Nationale	UN	Ashok Jugnauth		2014

=== Former alliances ===
Name	Leader	Parties	Elections participated	Founded	Dissolved	Colours	Emblem
Independence Party	Sir Seewoosagur Ramgoolam	PTR/IFB/CAM	1976 general election, 1967 general election				
Parti de l'Alliance Nationale	Sir Seewoosagur Ramgoolam	PTR/CAM/PMSD	1982 general election				
Alliance MMM/PSM	Sir Anerood Jugnauth	MMM/MSP	1982 general election				
MSM/Travailliste	Sir Anerood Jugnauth	MSM/PTR	1983 general election				
L'Union MMM/MTD/FFS	Prem Nababsing	MMM/MTD/FFS	1987 general election				
Alliance MSM - Mauritius Labour Party	Sir Anerood Jugnauth	MSM/PTR	1987 general election, By-Election 1989				
Alliance Parti Travailliste-PMSD	Navin Ramgoolam	PTR/PMSD	1991 general election				
Alliance MSM-MMM	Sir Anerood Jugnauth	MSM/MMM	1991 general election, By-Election 1992				
Alliance PTr-MMM	Navin Ramgoolam	PTR/MMM	By-Election 1995, 1995 general election				
Alliance MSM-RMM	Sir Anerood Jugnauth	MSM/	By-Election 1995, 1995 general election				
Federation MSM-MMM		MSM/MMM	By-Election 1999				
Alliance Parti Travailliste-PMXD	Navin Ramgoolam	PTR/PMXD	By-Election 1999, 2000 general election				
Alliance MSM-MMM	Paul Berenger	MSM/MMM	2000 general election, By-Election 2003				
Alliance Sociale	Navin Ramgoolam	PTR/PMXD/VF/MR/MMSM	2005 general election			Red	
Alliance MSM/MMM	Paul Berenger	MSM/MMM	2005 general election				
Alliance MMM/UN/PMSD	Paul Berenger	MSM/UN/PMSD	By-Election 2009				
Alliance de L'Avenir	Navin Ramgoolam	PTR/PMSD/MSM	2010 general election	2010	6 June 2014	Blue, White and Red	
Alliance du Coeur	Paul Berenger	MMM/UN/MMSD	2010 general election			Purple	
Remake 2000	Sir Anerood Jugnauth	MMM/MSM	None		24 April 2014	Purple and Orange	
Alliance de l'unité et de la modernité	Navin Ramgoolam	PTR/MMM	2014 general election	2014	2014	Red and Purple	
Alliance Lepep	Sir Anerood Jugnauth/Pravind Jughnauth	MSM/PMSD/ML	2014 general election	2014	2024	Orange, White and Blue	
Alliance du Changement	Navin Ramgoolam	PTR/MMM/ND/REA	2024 general election	2024		Red, Purple, Blue and Yellow	

== Parties in Rodrigues ==
Political parties in Rodrigues island.

Name	Abbr.	Leader	Actual alliance
Front Patriotique Rodrigues	FPR	Johnson Roussety	None
Mouvement Rodriguais	MR	Gaëtan Jabeemissar	None
Organisation du Peuple Rodriguais	OPR	Serge Clair	None

== See also ==
- Politics of Mauritius
- List of political parties by country
- List of prime ministers of Mauritius
