= List of prime ministers of Mauritius =

Five people have served as prime minister of Mauritius since the office was established in 1967, by virtue of the Mauritius Constitution (Amendment No.3) Order. Additionally, one person has served as chief minister and premier of Mauritius, the preceding offices which existed from 1961 to 1964 and from 1964 to 1967 respectively, while Mauritius was still a British crown colony.

== List of officeholders ==
Political parties

Labour Party (Parti Travailliste) (PTr)
Mauritian Militant Movement (MMM)
Militant Socialist Movement (MSM)

=== Chief Minister of Mauritius ===
No.	Portrait	Name (Birth–Death)	Election	Term of office			Political party	Ref.
No.	Portrait	Name (Birth–Death)	Election	Took office	Left office	Time in office	Political party	Ref.
1		Seewoosagur Ramgoolam (1900–1985)	1959	26 September 1961	21 October 1963	2 years, 168 days	PTr	
1		Seewoosagur Ramgoolam (1900–1985)	1963	21 October 1963	12 March 1964	2 years, 168 days	PTr	

=== Premier of Mauritius ===
No.	Portrait	Name (Birth–Death)	Election	Term of office			Political party	Ref.
No.	Portrait	Name (Birth–Death)	Election	Took office	Left office	Time in office	Political party	Ref.
1		Sir Seewoosagur Ramgoolam (1900–1985)	—	12 March 1964	7 August 1967	3 years, 281 days	PTr	
1		Sir Seewoosagur Ramgoolam (1900–1985)	1967	7 August 1967	18 December 1967	3 years, 281 days	PTr	

=== Prime Ministers of Mauritius ===
No.	Portrait	Name (Birth–Death)	Election	Term of office			Political party	Government	Ref.
No.	Portrait	Name (Birth–Death)	Election	Took office	Left office	Time in office	Political party	Government	Ref.
1		Sir Seewoosagur Ramgoolam (1900–1985)	—	18 December 1967	28 December 1976	14 years, 179 days	PTr	S. Ramgoolam V	
1		Sir Seewoosagur Ramgoolam (1900–1985)	1976	28 December 1976	15 June 1982	14 years, 179 days	PTr	S. Ramgoolam VI	
2		Sir Anerood Jugnauth (1930–2021)	1982	15 June 1982	27 August 1983	13 years, 190 days	MMM	A. Jugnauth I	
2		Sir Anerood Jugnauth (1930–2021)	1982	15 June 1982	27 August 1983	13 years, 190 days	MSM	A. Jugnauth I	
2		Sir Anerood Jugnauth (1930–2021)	1983	27 August 1983	4 September 1987	13 years, 190 days	MSM	A. Jugnauth II	
2		Sir Anerood Jugnauth (1930–2021)	1987	4 September 1987	27 September 1991	13 years, 190 days	MSM	A. Jugnauth III	
2		Sir Anerood Jugnauth (1930–2021)	1991	27 September 1991	22 December 1995	13 years, 190 days	MSM	A. Jugnauth IV	
3		Navin Ramgoolam (born 1947)	1995	27 December 1995	16 September 2000	4 years, 264 days	PTr	N. Ramgoolam I	
(2)		Sir Anerood Jugnauth (1930–2021)	2000	16 September 2000	30 September 2003	3 years, 14 days	MSM	A. Jugnauth V	
4		Paul Bérenger (born 1945)	2000	30 September 2003	5 July 2005	1 year, 278 days	MMM	Bérenger	
(3)		Navin Ramgoolam (born 1947)	2005	5 July 2005	11 May 2010	9 years, 161 days	PTr	N. Ramgoolam II	
(3)		Navin Ramgoolam (born 1947)	2010	11 May 2010	13 December 2014	9 years, 161 days	PTr	N. Ramgoolam III	
(2)		Sir Anerood Jugnauth (1930–2021)	2014	13 December 2014	23 January 2017	2 years, 41 days	MSM	A. Jugnauth VI	
5		Pravind Jugnauth (born 1961)	2014	23 January 2017	12 November 2019	7 years, 294 days	MSM	P. Jugnauth I	
5		Pravind Jugnauth (born 1961)	2019	12 November 2019	12 November 2024	7 years, 294 days	MSM	P. Jugnauth II	
(3)		Navin Ramgoolam (born 1947)	2024	12 November 2024	Incumbent	1 year, 343 days	PTr	N. Ramgoolam IV	

== Rank by time in office ==
This list also includes holders of the post of Chief Minister and Premier of Mauritius.

Rank	Head of government	Tenure length	Tenures	Party	Start	End	Reason for exit
1	Seewoosagur Ramgoolam	20 years, 262 days	4	PTr	26 September 1961	15 June 1982	Defeat in election
2	Anerood Jugnauth	18 years, 245 days	6	MMM	15 June 1982	22 December 1995	Defeat in election
2	Anerood Jugnauth	18 years, 245 days	6	MSM	15 June 1982	22 December 1995	Defeat in election
2	Anerood Jugnauth	18 years, 245 days	6	MSM	16 September 2000	30 September 2003	Resigned
2	Anerood Jugnauth	18 years, 245 days	6	MSM	13 December 2014	23 January 2017	Resigned
3	Navin Ramgoolam	16 years, 43 days	4	PTr	27 December 1995	16 September 2000	Defeat in election
3	Navin Ramgoolam	16 years, 43 days	4	PTr	5 July 2005	13 December 2014	Defeat in election
3	Navin Ramgoolam	16 years, 43 days	4	PTr	12 November 2024	Incumbent	
4	Pravind Jugnauth	7 years, 294 days	2	MSM	23 January 2017	12 November 2024	Defeat in election
5	Paul Bérenger	1 year, 278 days	1	MMM	30 September 2003	5 July 2005	Defeat in election

== See also ==
- Prime Minister of Mauritius
- Spouse of the prime minister of Mauritius
- List of heads of state of Mauritius
- President of Mauritius
- Governor of Mauritius
- List of political parties in Mauritius
