= 2000 Mauritian general election =

- 11 September 2000

All 62 directly elected seats in the National Assembly (and up to 8 BLS seats)
- Turnout: 80.86% (▲1.17pp)
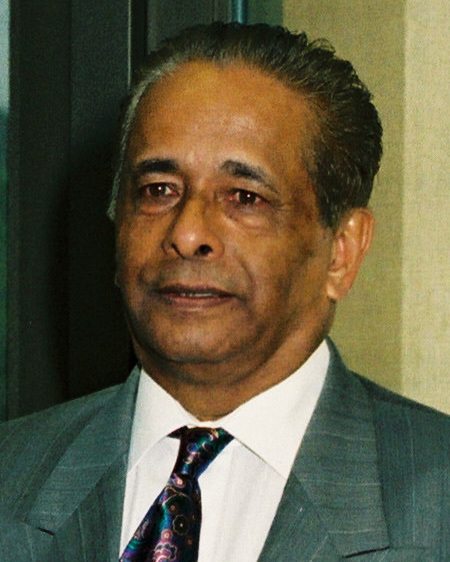

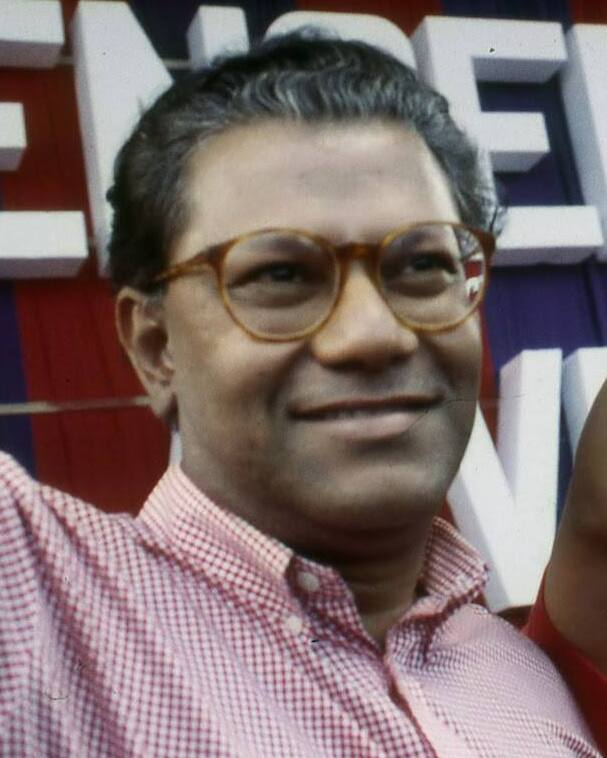
	First party	Second party
Leader	Anerood Jugnauth	Navin Ramgoolam
Party	MSM	Labour
Alliance	MSM/MMM	Ptr–PMXD
Seats won	58	8
Popular vote	951,643	672,336
Percentage	51.34%	36.27%
- Result by constituency. The colour shade shows the percentage of the elected candidate with the highest number of votes
Prime Minister before election
Navin Ramgoolam
Labour
Subsequent Prime Minister
Anerood Jugnauth
MSM

General elections were held in Mauritius on 11 September 2000 to elect the members of the National Assembly.

The opposition Mauritian Militant Movement (MMM) party decisively won the elections in coalition with the Militant Socialist Movement (MSM), defeating the governing Mauritian Labour Party (MLP) led coalition. They formed together the MSM/MMM As a result, in a pre-election deal Anerood Jugnauth of the Militant Socialist Movement became Prime Minister of Mauritius before handing over to Paul Bérenger of the Mauritian Militant Movement in 2003.

== Background ==
The Labour Party led by Navin Ramgoolam had governed Mauritius since winning the 1995 election. A new election had to be held by December 2000 and Ramgoolam dissolved parliament to call the election on 11 August 2000. He expected to be able to win the election in a three-way contest with the Mauritian Militant Movement and Militant Socialist Movement parties splitting the opposition vote between them. However ten days after the election was called the two main opposition parties agreed a deal.

The MSM led by Anerood Jugnauth and MMM led by Paul Bérenger agreed that if they won the election Jugnauth would become prime minister. They agreed that after three years he would step down as prime minister to become the president of Mauritius with enhanced powers, and that Bérenger would become prime minister, the first non-Hindu to do so.

== Electoral system ==
The election was conducted under the first past the post system with three Members of parliament being elected from each of 20 mainland constituencies. A further two MPs were elected from the island of Rodrigues. Each voter was required to vote for three candidates with the possibility of panachage. Once these 62 MPs were decided the Supervisory Electoral Commission chose the eight 'best losers' to prevent any ethnic community or political party from being underrepresented. The Commission chose four MPs to balance the ethnic groups (Hindus, Muslims, Chinese and general population) and another four to balance the political parties. The 'best losers' could only come from candidates who came fourth in the 20 mainland constituencies.

== Campaign ==
There were 43 parties putting forth 535 candidates but the main contest was between the two main coalitions that campaigned on similar platforms with the economy being the dominant election issue. The governing Mauritian Labour Party promised to raise civil servants' wages and reduce the prices of drinks while the main opposition attacked corruption. Both the government and opposition parties pledged to create 70,000 jobs.

The campaign was peaceful and election day was quiet with the sale or serving of alcohol banned for two days during the election to prevent trouble. Observers from the Southern African Development Community praised the election for its efficient and fair conduct and the high turnout. The opposition Mauritian Militant Movement and Militant Socialist Movement parties won a decisive victory almost wiping out the governing party and the Prime Minister Navin Ramgoolam admitted defeat the day after the election. Gender activists were disappointed with the results which saw only four seats won by women, a decline on the previous election in 1995.

== Results ==
Party or alliance	Votes	%	Seats		
Party or alliance	Votes	%	Cons	BL	Total
MSM-MMM	951,643	51.34	54	4	58
Labour Party–PMXD	672,336	36.27	6	2	8
Hizbullah	59,232	3.20	0	0	0
National Democratic Movement Raj Dayal	54,960	2.97	0	0	0
Rodrigues People's Organisation	17,317	0.93	2	0	2
Rodrigues Movement	15,801	0.85	0	2	2
Lalit	14,960	0.81	0	0	0
Mauritian People's Party	6,478	0.35	0	0	0
Nouvo Lizour	5,152	0.28	0	0	0
Tamil Council	3,787	0.20	0	0	0
Liberal Action Party	3,444	0.19	0	0	0
Mauritian Authentic Movement	3,225	0.17	0	0	0
Mauritian Action Committee	2,668	0.14	0	0	0
Mauritian Democratic Movement	2,211	0.12	0	0	0
Mauritian Union	1,672	0.09	0	0	0
Mauritian National Movement	1,485	0.08	0	0	0
Agricultural Planter Movement	665	0.04	0	0	0
Mauritian Democracy	490	0.03	0	0	0
Mauritian Party of Xavier-Luc Duval	449	0.02	0	0	0
Socialist Labour Party	120	0.01	0	0	0
Mauritius Party Rights	107	0.01	0	0	0
Independents	35,263	1.90	0	0	0
Total	1,853,465	100.00	62	8	70
Valid votes	623,463	98.92			
Invalid/blank votes	6,829	1.08			
Total votes	630,292	100.00			
Registered voters/turnout	779,431	80.87			
Source: Electoral Commission, African Elections Database

=== By constituency ===
Constituency		MP	Party	Notes
1	Grand River North West– Port Louis West	Jean-Claude Barbier	MMM	Reelected
1	Grand River North West– Port Louis West	Arianne Navarre-Marie	MMM	Reelected
1	Grand River North West– Port Louis West	Jean-Claude Armance	VF	Elected
1	Grand River North West– Port Louis West	James Burty David	PTr	Best Loser; Reelected
2	Port Louis South– Port Louis Central	Emmanuel Leung Shing	MSM	Elected
2	Port Louis South– Port Louis Central	Rashid Beebeejaun	PTr	Reelected
2	Port Louis South– Port Louis Central	Sahid Maudarbocus	MMM	Elected
2	Port Louis South– Port Louis Central	Ahmad Jeewah	MMM	Best Loser; Reelected
3	Port Louis Maritime– Port Louis East	Sam Lauthan	MMM	Reelected
3	Port Louis Maritime– Port Louis East	Siddick Chady	PTr	Reelected
3	Port Louis Maritime– Port Louis East	Mohammad Nanchuck	MMM	Reelected
3	Port Louis Maritime– Port Louis East	Anwar Oomar	MSM	Best Loser
4	Port Louis North– Montagne Longue	Meckduth Chumroo	MSM	Elected
4	Port Louis North– Montagne Longue	Gérard Grivon	MMM	Elected
4	Port Louis North– Montagne Longue	Joe Lesjongard	MSM	Elected
5	Pamplemousses–Triolet	Navin Ramgoolam	PTr	Reelected
5	Pamplemousses–Triolet	Jyaneshwur Jhurry	MSM	Elected
5	Pamplemousses–Triolet	Devendranath Hurnam	MMM	Elected
6	Grand Baie–Poudre D'Or	Pradeep Jeeha	MMM	Reelected
6	Grand Baie–Poudre D'Or	Ashit Gungah	MSM	Elected
6	Grand Baie–Poudre D'Or	Madan Dulloo	MMSM	Elected
7	Piton–Riviere du Rempart	Anerood Jugnauth	MSM	Elected
7	Piton–Riviere du Rempart	Balkissoon Hookoom	PTr	Elected
7	Piton–Riviere du Rempart	Jai Prakash Meenowa	MMM	Reelected
7	Piton–Riviere du Rempart	Ravi Yerrigadoo	MSM	Best Loser
8	Quartier Militaire–Moka	Parmessur Ramloll	MSM	Elected
8	Quartier Militaire–Moka	Ashok Jugnauth	MSM	Elected
8	Quartier Militaire–Moka	Deven Nagalingum	MMM	Elected
9	Flacq–Bon Accueil	Anil Bachoo	MSM	Elected
9	Flacq–Bon Accueil	Sangeet Fowdar	MMM	Elected
9	Flacq–Bon Accueil	Prem Koonjoo	MSM	Elected
10	Montagne Blanche– Grand River South East	Mookhesswur Choonee	MSM	Elected
10	Montagne Blanche– Grand River South East	Ajay Gunness	MMM	Elected
10	Montagne Blanche– Grand River South East	Rashad Daureeawoo	MSM	Elected
11	Vieux Grand Port–Rose Belle	Pravind Jugnauth	MSM	Elected
11	Vieux Grand Port–Rose Belle	Arvin Boolell	PTr	Reelected
11	Vieux Grand Port–Rose Belle	Rajesh Bhowon	MSM	Elected
11	Vieux Grand Port–Rose Belle	Motee Ramdass	MMM	Best Loser
12	Mahebourg–Plaine Magnien	Anil Gayan	MSM	Elected
12	Mahebourg–Plaine Magnien	Soudesh Roopun	MMM	Elected
12	Mahebourg–Plaine Magnien	Ivan Collendavelloo	MMM	Elected
13	Riviere des Anguilles–Souillac	Hurreeprem Aumeer	MSM	Elected
13	Riviere des Anguilles–Souillac	Abdool Nasser Issimdar	MMM	Elected
13	Riviere des Anguilles–Souillac	Veda Baloomoody	MMM	Reelected
14	Savanne–Black River	Alan Ganoo	MMM	Reelected
14	Savanne–Black River	José Arunasalom	MMM	Reelected
14	Savanne–Black River	Prithvirajsing Roopun	MSM	Elected
15	La Caverne–Phoenix	Leela Dookun-Luchoomun	MSM	Elected
15	La Caverne–Phoenix	Steven Obeegadoo	MMM	Reelected
15	La Caverne–Phoenix	Showkutally Soodhun	MSM	Elected
16	Vacoas–Floreal	Nando Bodha	MSM	Elected
16	Vacoas–Floreal	Sewram Sakaram	MMM	Reelected
16	Vacoas–Floreal	Sylvio Michel	VF	Elected
17	Curepipe–Midlands	Éric Guimbeau	MMM	Elected
17	Curepipe–Midlands	Gérard Paya	MSM	Elected
17	Curepipe–Midlands	Sunil Dowarkasing	MR	Elected
17	Curepipe–Midlands	Xavier-Luc Duval	PMXD	Best Loser
18	Belle Rose–Quatre Bornes	Sushil Khushiram	MMM	Elected
18	Belle Rose–Quatre Bornes	Prithviraj Putten	MSM	Elected
18	Belle Rose–Quatre Bornes	Danielle Perrier	MMM	Reelected
19	Stanley–Rose Hill	Paul Bérenger	MMM	Reelected
19	Stanley–Rose Hill	Jayen Cuttaree	MMM	Reelected
19	Stanley–Rose Hill	Feroz Abdoola	MSM	Elected
20	Beau Bassin–Petite Riviere	Rajesh Bhagwan	MMM	Reelected
20	Beau Bassin–Petite Riviere	Françoise Labelle	MMM	Elected
20	Beau Bassin–Petite Riviere	Maurice Allet	PMSD	Elected
21	Rodrigues	Alex Nancy	OPR	Reelected
21	Rodrigues	Serge Clair	OPR	Reelected
21	Rodrigues	Nicolas Von Mally	MR	Best Loser; Reelected
21	Rodrigues	Christian Leopold	MR	Best Loser
Source: Government of Mauritius
