= 2010 Mauritian general election =

- 5 May 2010

All 62 directly elected seats in the National Assembly (and up to 8 BLS seats)
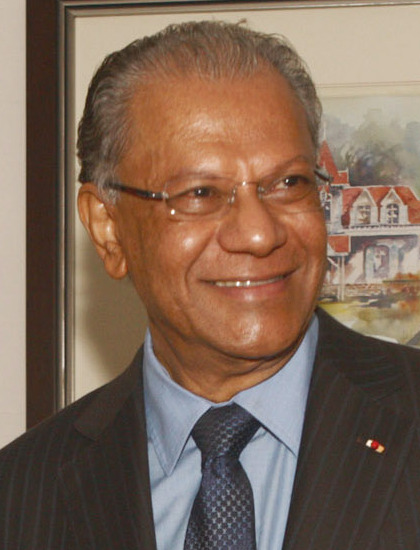

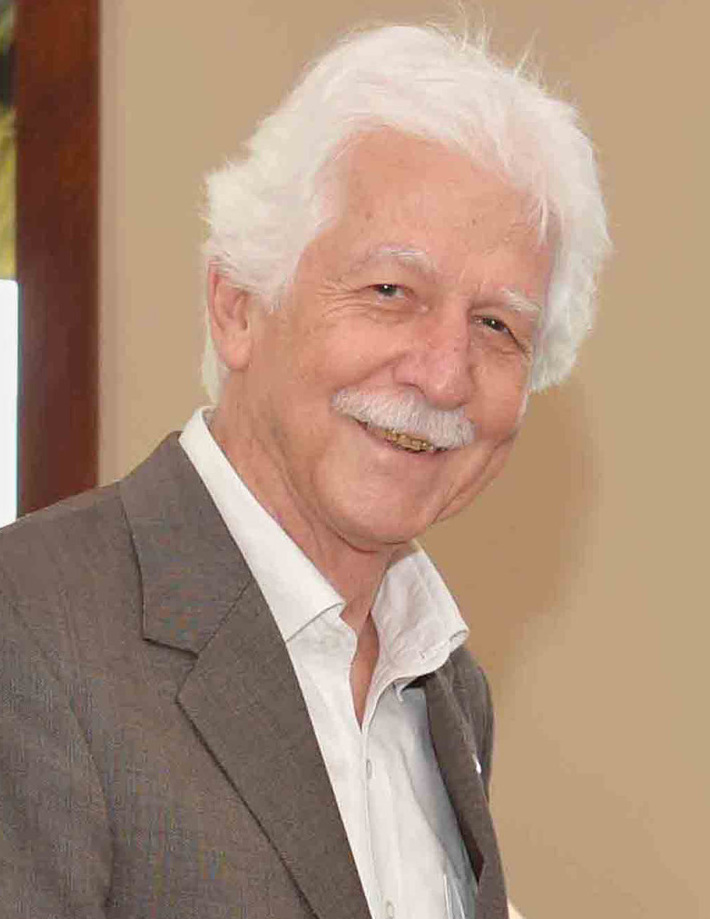
	First party	Second party
Leader	Navin Ramgoolam	Paul Berenger
Party	Labour	MMM
Alliance	PTR–PMSD–MSM	MMM–UN–MMSD
Seats won	41	19
Popular vote	1,001,903	847,095
Percentage	49.69%	42.01%
- Result by constituency. The colour shade shows the percentage of the elected candidate with the highest number of votes
Prime Minister before election
Navin Ramgoolam
Labour
Subsequent Prime Minister
Navin Ramgoolam
Labour

General elections were held in Mauritius on 5 May 2010. The coalition comprising Mauritius Labour Party under Navin Ramgoolam, the Militant Socialist Movement under Pravind Jugnauth and the Mauritian Social Democrat Party under Xavier-Luc Duval won a majority with 41 seats in the parliament. The Mauritian Militant Movement-led coalition under Paul Berenger finished second with 18 seats. The Mauritian Solidarity Front won one seat and the Rodrigues Movement won the two remaining seats. The elections were the ninth to be held since independence from the United Kingdom in 1968.

The Mauritius Labour Party, Mauritian Social Democrat Party (PMSD) and Militant Socialist Movement (MSM) formed an electoral coalition called Alliance de L'Avenir (English: Alliance of the Future) for this election. Ramgoolam, the alliance leader, allotted 35 seats to his own party to compete for the 60 seats on the island, whereas the MSM was given 18 and the PMSD 7. Before the election, it appeared that Berenger might gain back the PM's post that he held from 2003 to 2005; he was the first prime minister since independence that was not of South Asian origin. Berenger led his own alliance of parties, known as the Alliance du Coeur (English: Alliance of the Heart), a reference to the official logo of the Mauritian Militant Movement, by far the biggest party in that alliance. Parties based in Rodrigues compete for the two remaining seats, with the Rodrigues People's Organisation and the Rodrigues Movement being the main parties there.

During the election, 62 seats in the National Assembly of Mauritius were contested with a further eight seats to be designated by the electoral commission under a complex formula designed to keep a balance of ethnic groups in the parliament. The candidates must declare which ethnic group (Hindu, Muslim, Chinese or "general population") they belong to in order to run for a seat. In 2010, 104 of the candidates refused to do so, resulting in them being disqualified, leaving 529 candidates for the seats. Around 130 foreign observers, including some from the African Union and the Southern African Development Community, were present to monitor the voting process.

Around 900,000 people were eligible to vote in the election. The main issues debated were economic and constitutional reform, fraud, corruption, drug trafficking and ethnicity. Paul Berenger accused the incumbent government of abusing the state-owned television station, the Mauritius Broadcasting Corporation, to influence voters. He also accused his political opponents of using communalism and of negatively drawing attention to his minority Franco-Mauritian ancestry to swing voters against him.

The Alliance de l'Avenir received 49% of the vote and won 41 seats, while the Alliance du Coeur received 42% of the vote and won 18 seats. The remaining parties and independent candidates received 8% of the vote. From the 62 seats, only ten women were elected.

After the Alliance de L'Avenir was declared winner of the elections, its leader, Navin Ramgoolam, mentioned that he would govern in the interest of every Mauritian so that no one would be left behind. He added that the priorities of his government were the improvement of road infrastructures, the security of the people, education, health and youth development. Paul Berenger, who conceded defeat after the election, said that members of his party would continue their fight for a better Mauritius. He claimed that this election had not been free and fair, attributing the defeat of his alliance to numerous factors including biased coverage of the election by the state-owned television station, more financial resources by his political opponents, communalism and the electoral system. However, he would be prepared to work with the government for electoral reform, especially because his alliance had obtained only 18 of the 62 seats despite seizing 43% of popular votes.

On 7 May 2010, the Electoral Supervisory Commission made their decision on the non-elected candidates to occupy the eight best loser seats in the National Assembly based on the religious and ethnic declarations of the candidates not elected, a system referred to as the 'Best Loser System'. Exceptionally, instead of 8, only 7 candidates were designated. Per the normal procedure, 4 best loser seats are allotted to candidates not elected but having obtained the highest percentage of votes as a member of a political party. However, they had to be of an appropriate religion or ethnic to maintain a balance in the parliament. 4 other seats are to be allotted so as not to change the result of the election. The Alliance de L'Avenir was allotted 4 additional seats whereas the Alliance du Coeur obtained 2 additional seats. Whereas the Electoral Supervisory Commission had no problem in attributing one seat to one candidate of the Rodrigues People's Organisation, they had difficulty in choosing a candidate for the 8th seat, which normally has to be a Sino-Mauritian of one of the two other successful parties in this election. But given neither the Mauritian Solidarity Front nor the Rodrigues Movement had candidates of this community during this election, no candidate was named for the 8th additional seat.

Observers from the African Union for this election declared that the Best Loser system is problematic for the national unity of the country though it can reinforce social cohesion. They also considered the 2010 Mauritian general elections to have been 'free and transparent'.

== Results ==
Party	Votes	%	Seats		
Party	Votes	%	Cons	BL	Total
Alliance de L'Avenir (PTR–PMSD–MSM)	1,001,903	49.69	41	4	45
Alliance du Coeur (MMM–UN–MMSD)	847,095	42.01	18	2	20
Mauritian Solidarity Front	51,161	2.54	1	0	1
Rodrigues Movement	20,933	1.04	2	0	2
Rodrigues People's Organisation	18,815	0.93	0	1	1
Mouvement Democratique National	13,957	0.69	0	0	0
Parti Malin	6,874	0.34	0	0	0
Forum des Citoyens Libres	4,167	0.21	0	0	0
Les Verts Fraternels	2,722	0.13	0	0	0
Parti Action Liberal	2,704	0.13	0	0	0
Mouvement Authentique Mauricien	2,369	0.12	0	0	0
Parti du Peuple Mauricien	2,072	0.10	0	0	0
Mouvement Travailleurs Mauricien	1,862	0.09	0	0	0
Mouvement Democratique Mauricien	1,703	0.08	0	0	0
Parti Tireurs Disables	1,549	0.08	0	0	0
Mouvement Citoyen Mauricien	1,290	0.06	0	0	0
Union Démocratique de Rodrigues	1,059	0.05	0	0	0
Front Socialiste	840	0.04	0	0	0
Union Patriots Ilois Mauricien	752	0.04	0	0	0
Parti Liberateur Mauricien	559	0.03	0	0	0
Unir pour Batir	355	0.02	0	0	0
Democratie Mauricienne	290	0.01	0	0	0
Socialist Labour Party	271	0.01	0	0	0
Rassemblement Socialiste Mauricien	267	0.01	0	0	0
MSTMRA	259	0.01	0	0	0
Parti Socialiste Mauricien	185	0.01	0	0	0
Groupe de Cinq	172	0.01	0	0	0
Front Progressiste du Peuple Rodriguais	168	0.01	0	0	0
Parti Rodriguais Travailleur Democrate	129	0.01	0	0	0
Regional Autonomy Movement	124	0.01	0	0	0
Regroupment Jeunes Socialiste Democrate	111	0.01	0	0	0
Party Socialiste Plus	94	0.00	0	0	0
Mouvement Travailliste Socialiste	64	0.00	0	0	0
Mauritius Party Rights	61	0.00	0	0	0
Independents	29,491	1.46	0	0	0
Total	2,016,427	100.00	62	7	69
Valid votes	678,992	99.16			
Invalid/blank votes	5,777	0.84			
Total votes	684,769	100.00			
Registered voters/turnout	879,897	77.82			
Source: Electoral Commission, IPU

=== By constituency ===
Constituency		MP	Party	Notes
1	Grand River North West– Port Louis West	Arianne Navarre-Marie	MMM	Reelected
1	Grand River North West– Port Louis West	Jean Claude Barbier	MMM	Reelected
1	Grand River North West– Port Louis West	Veda Baloomoody	MMM	Reelected
2	Port Louis South– Port Louis Central	Rashid Beebeejaun	PTr	Reelected
2	Port Louis South– Port Louis Central	Reza Uteem	MMM	Elected
2	Port Louis South– Port Louis Central	Abdullah Hossen	PTr	Elected
3	Port Louis Maritime– Port Louis East	Aadil Ameer Meea	MMM	Elected
3	Port Louis Maritime– Port Louis East	Shakeel Mohamed	PTr	Reelected
3	Port Louis Maritime– Port Louis East	Cehl Meeah	FSM	Elected
4	Port Louis North– Montagne Longue	Mireille Martin	MSM	Reelected
4	Port Louis North– Montagne Longue	Joe Lesjongard	MMM	Reelected
4	Port Louis North– Montagne Longue	Kalyanee Juggoo	PTr	Elected
4	Port Louis North– Montagne Longue	Aurore Perraud	PMSD	Best Loser
5	Pamplemousses–Triolet	Navin Ramgoolam	PTr	Reelected
5	Pamplemousses–Triolet	Devanand Ritoo	PTr	Reelected
5	Pamplemousses–Triolet	Satish Faugoo	PTr	Reelected
6	Grand Baie–Poudre d'Or	Ashit Gungah	MSM	Elected
6	Grand Baie–Poudre d'Or	Lormus Bundhoo	PTr	Reelected
6	Grand Baie–Poudre d'Or	Mookhesswur Choonee	PTr	Elected
7	Piton–Rivière du Rempart	Pratibha Bholah	MSM	Elected
7	Piton–Rivière du Rempart	Balkissoon Hookoom	PTr	Reelected
7	Piton–Rivière du Rempart	Deva Virahsawmy	PTr	Elected
8	Quartier Militaire–Moka	Pravind Jugnauth	MSM	Elected
8	Quartier Militaire–Moka	Leela Dookun-Luchoomun	MSM	Reelected
8	Quartier Militaire–Moka	Suren Dayal	PTr	Reelected
9	Flacq–Bon Accueil	Anil Bachoo	PTr	Reelected
9	Flacq–Bon Accueil	Dhiraj Khamajeet	PTr	Elected
9	Flacq–Bon Accueil	Prithvirajsing Roopun	MSM	Elected
10	Montagne Blanche– Grand River South East	Rajesh Jeetah	PTr	Reelected
10	Montagne Blanche– Grand River South East	Jim Seetaram	MSM	Elected
10	Montagne Blanche– Grand River South East	Cader Sayed-Hossen	PTr	Reelected
11	Vieux Grand Port–Rose Belle	Arvin Boolell	PTr	Reelected
11	Vieux Grand Port–Rose Belle	Mahen Seeruttun	MSM	Elected
11	Vieux Grand Port–Rose Belle	Sutyadeo Moutia	PTr	Reelected
12	Mahébourg–Plaine Magnien	Mahen Jhugroo	MSM	Reelected
12	Mahébourg–Plaine Magnien	Vasant Bunwaree	PTr	Reelected
12	Mahébourg–Plaine Magnien	Thierry Henry	PMSD	Elected
13	Rivière des Anguilles–Souillac	Pradeep Peetumber	PTr	Reelected
13	Rivière des Anguilles–Souillac	Abu Kasenally	PTr	Reelected
13	Rivière des Anguilles–Souillac	Tassarajen Pillay	MSM	Elected
14	Savanne–Black River	Alan Ganoo	MMM	Reelected
14	Savanne–Black River	Maya Hanoomanjee	MSM	Reelected
14	Savanne–Black River	Hervé Aimée	PTr	Elected
14	Savanne–Black River	Josique Radegonde	MMM	Best Loser
15	La Cavèrne–Phoenix	Patrick Assirvaden	PTr	Elected
15	La Cavèrne–Phoenix	Showkutally Soodhun	MSM	Reelected
15	La Cavèrne–Phoenix	Rihun Hawoldar	PTr	Reelected
15	La Cavèrne–Phoenix	Raffick Sorefan	MMM	Best Loser
16	Vacoas–Floréal	Nando Bodha	MSM	Reelected
16	Vacoas–Floréal	Sheila Bappoo	PTr	Reelected
16	Vacoas–Floréal	Françoise Labelle	MMM	Reelected
16	Vacoas–Floréal	Stéphanie Anquetil	PTr	Best Loser
17	Curepipe–Midlands	Éric Guimbeau	MMSD	Reelected
17	Curepipe–Midlands	Satish Boolell	MMM	Elected
17	Curepipe–Midlands	Steven Obeegadoo	MMM	Elected
17	Curepipe–Midlands	Michael Sik Yuen	PMSD	Best Loser
18	Belle Rose–Quatre Bornes	Xavier-Luc Duval	PMSD	Reelected
18	Belle Rose–Quatre Bornes	Kavy Ramano	MMM	Elected
18	Belle Rose–Quatre Bornes	Nita Deerpalsing	PTr	Reelected
19	Stanley–Rose Hill	Paul Bérenger	MMM	Reelected
19	Stanley–Rose Hill	Deven Nagalingum	MMM	Elected
19	Stanley–Rose Hill	Nicole Ribot	MMM	Elected
19	Stanley–Rose Hill	Reza Issack	PTr	Best Loser; Reelected
20	Beau Bassin–Petite Rivière	Rajesh Bhagwan	MMM	Reelected
20	Beau Bassin–Petite Rivière	Kee Li Kwong Wing	MMM	Elected
20	Beau Bassin–Petite Rivière	Franco Quirin	MMM	Elected
21	Rodrigues	Christian Leopold	MR	Reelected
21	Rodrigues	Nicolas Von Mally	MR	Reelected
21	Rodrigues	Francisco François	OPR	Best Loser
Source: OEC, OEC
