= Leela Dookun-Luchoomun =

Mauritian politician (born 1961)

Leela Devi Dookun-Luchoomun GCSK
- ळीला डेवि डूखुन ळुचूमुन
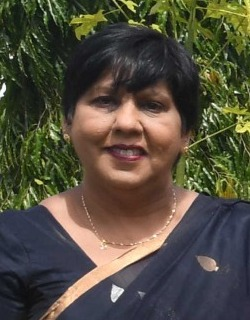

Minister of Social Security
- In office 11 May 2010 – 26 July 2011
- President: Sir Anerood Jugnauth
- Prime Minister: Navin Ramgoolam
- Preceded by: Sheila Bappoo
- Succeeded by: Office Vacant

Minister of Arts & Culture
- In office 16 December 2004 – 5 July 2005
- President: Anerood Jugnauth
- Prime Minister: Paul Berenger
- Preceded by: Mookheshwur Choonee
- Succeeded by: Vasant Bunwaree

Parliamentary Private Secretary
- In office 10 October 2000 – 16 December 2004
- President: Cassam Uteem; Karl Offmann; Sir Anerood Jugnauth
- Prime Minister: Sir Anerood Jugnauth; Paul Berenger

2nd Member of Parliament For Moka & Quartier Militaire
- Incumbent
- Assumed office 5 May 2010
- President: Sir Anerood Jugnauth; Kailash Purryag; Ameenah Gurib
- Prime Minister: Navin Ramgoolam; Anerood Jugnauth; Pravind Jugnauth
- Preceded by: Suren Dayal

1st Member of Parliament for La Caverne & Phoenix
- In office 11 September 2000 – 5 May 2010
- President: Cassam Uteem; Karl Offmann; Sir Anerood Jugnauth
- Prime Minister: Anerood Jugnauth; Paul Berenger; Navin Ramgoolam

Personal details
- Born: 16 April 1961 (age 65) Bonne Terre, Vacoas-Phoenix, Mauritius
- Party: Militant Socialist Movement
- Occupation: Educator

Leela Devi Dookun Luchoomun MP GCSK (born ळीला डेवि डूखुन ळुचूमुन on 16 April 1961) is the former Minister of Social Security of Mauritius serving in the cabinet of Navin Ramgoolam having been appointed on 11 May 2010 by President Anerood Jugnauth. She is Member of Parliament representing Constituency No 8, Moka & Quartier Militaire. She is a former Minister of Arts & Culture serving in the cabinet of Paul Berenger for a short period of 6 months.

She was appointed as Parliamentary Private Secretary in September 2000 after the MSM/MMM coalition won the elections. She firstly served in the cabinet of Sir Anerood Jugnauth. She is a member of the Militant Socialist Movement and is the Vice President of the Party. She is also President of the Women Wing of the same political party. She is along with Nando Bodha and Showkatally Soodhun to form the front bench of the MSM in the Ptr-MSM-PMSD coalition government.

She is a farmer by profession. She is well known for being a highly renowned Primary Teacher in the country. Leela Devi Dookun Luchoomun has a rich political career. In 1996, she joined the Militant Socialist Movement and took part in the municipal elections of Vacoas-Phoenix, then stood as candidate in Constituency No 15, La Caverne & Phoenix in 2000. She was elected and served as 1st Member of parliament for the constituency. In 2005, the MSM/MMM coalition lost to Social Alliance and she was elected 3rd MP for the same constituency but serving in the opposition. She was member of the opposition from 2005 to 2010 before the general elections in 2010.

She holds a BSc Hons from the University of Delhi and completed her Postgraduate Certificate in Education at the MIE and her Postgraduate Diploma in Education (PGDip) from the University of Brighton. She is also a Part-time lecturer at the Mauritius Institute of Education. She is married and is the mother of two children.

On 12 March 2020, Mrs Dookun Luchoomun was elevated to the status of Grand Commander of The Order of the Star and Key of the Indian Ocean (GCSK) the highest decoration of the country by the President of the Republic of Mauritius His Excellency Mr Prithvirajsing Roopun for distinguished service in politics and education.

== Awards and decorations ==
- Mauritius:
  - Grand Commander of the Order of the Star and Key of the Indian Ocean (2020)

Best minister of Education of year in Africa 2020/21
