= Nando Bodha =

Mauritian politician

The Honorable Nandcoomar Bodha नन्दकुमार बोधा The MP
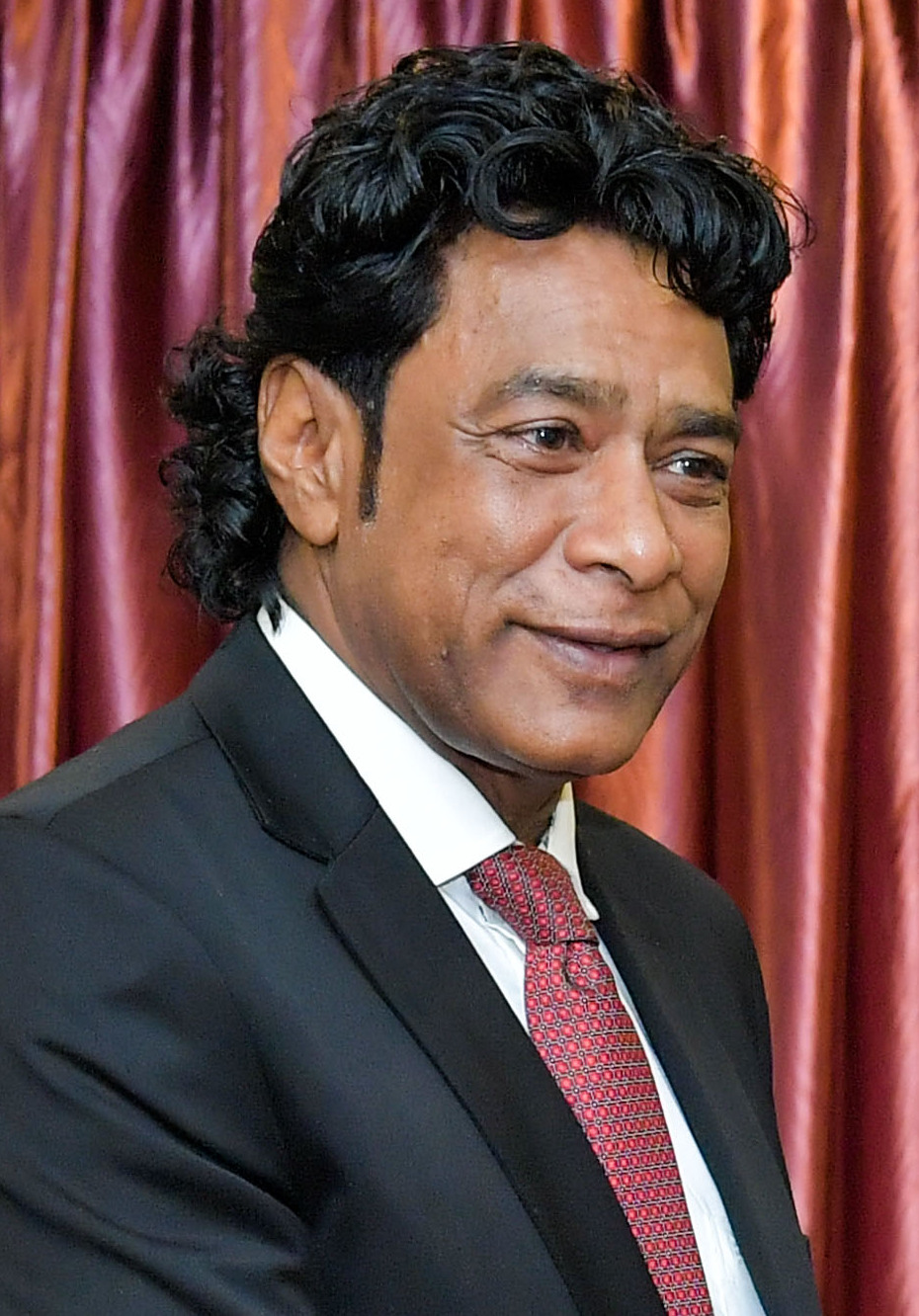
- Bodha in 2019

Minister of Foreign Affairs, Regional Integration and International Trade
- In office 12 November 2019 – 6 February 2021
- President: Barlen Vyapoory; Prithvirajsing Roopun
- Prime Minister: Pravind Jugnauth
- Preceded by: Lutchmeenaraidoo Seetanah

Minister of Tourism & Leisure
- In office 11 May 2010 – 26 July 2011
- President: Sir Anerood Jugnauth
- Prime Minister: Navin Ramgoolam
- Preceded by: Xavier-Luc Duval
- Succeeded by: Michael Sik Yuen
- In office 16 September 2000 – 7 October 2003
- President: Cassam Uteem; Karl Offmann
- Prime Minister: Anerood Jugnauth
- Preceded by: Marie Joseph Jacques Chateau De Balyon
- Succeeded by: Xavier-Luc Duval

9th Leader of the Opposition
- In office 5 April 2006 – 25 September 2007
- President: Sir Anerood Jugnauth
- Prime Minister: Navin Ramgoolam
- Preceded by: Paul Bérenger
- Succeeded by: Paul Bérenger

Minister of Agriculture
- In office 7 October 2003 – 5 July 2005
- President: Sir Anerood Jugnauth
- Prime Minister: Paul Berenger
- Preceded by: Pravind Jugnauth
- Succeeded by: Nhlanhla Nene

1st Member of Parliament for Vacoas & Floreal
- Incumbent
- Assumed office 11 September 2000
- President: Cassam Uteem; Karl Offmann; Sir Anerood Jugnauth
- Prime Minister: Anerood Jugnauth; Paul Berenger; Navin Ramgoolam

Director General of MBC
- In office 15 September 1991 – 20 December 1995
- Prime Minister: Sir Anerood Jugnauth

Personal details
- Born: 3 February 1954 (age 72) Terre Rouge, Pamplemousses District, British Mauritius
- Party: Militant Socialist Movement
- Spouse: Chaya Bodha
- Children: 3 children
- Occupation: Journalist, Barrister
- Awards: Grand Commander of the Order of the Star and Key of the Indian Ocean (2016)

Nandcoomar Bodha (born नन्दकुमार बोधा on 3 February 1954), commonly known as Nando Bodha, is a Mauritian barrister, TV news presenter, politician and former government minister.

== Early life and education ==
Nandcoomar Bodha was born to a Bihari Mauritian family in the village of Terre Rouge located in the Pamplemousses District. He studied at the Royal College Port Louis from 1966 to 1973. He then enrolled at the Centre universitaire de l’île de La Réunion where he obtained a DEUG in Human Science from 1974 to 1976. Bodha then studied geography and territorial planning from 1977 to 1981. In 1985 he gradudated with a diploma in communications from UNRTNA, then in 1986 he obtained another similar diploma from IAAP Paris. In 1991 he graduated from the Cranfield School of Management. Bodha also obtained an LLB in 1997 and admitted to the Bar Council of Mauritius in 1999.

== Career before politics ==
Bodha worked in Rennes, France as a technician in urban planning from 1977 to 1981. He returned to Mauritius where he taught at Lycée La Bourdonnais. Bodha was a journalist and TV presenter at the Mauritius Broadcasting Corporation from 1982 to 1985.

== Political career ==
Bodha's involvement in politics started in 1982 with the MMM, led by Anerood Jugnauth. He nearly received the investiture of the MMM at Constituency No.5 Pamplemousses Triolet before the 1983 General Elections. Bodha's political career eventually started in 1986 when Anerood Jugnauth appointed him as press officer at the Prime Minister's Office. Jugnauth then made him the deputy director general of the MBC in 1990, and he was promoted to the position of director general in 1991, where he remained until 1995 as Navin Ramgoolam replaced him by Bijaye Madhoo, a Labour Party activist and prominent spokesperson of socio-cultural movement Human Service Trust.

At the 20 December 1995 General Elections in Constituency No.6 Grand Baie Poudre D'Or, Nando Bodha received the investiture of the MSM-RMM alliance. But he came out in 5th place behind Dann Beeharry (PTr-MMM), Pradeep Jeeha (PTr-MMM), Siven Poinoosawmy (PTr-MMM), and Madan Dulloo (MMSM) (Labour-MMM).

In 2000 the MSM/MMM coalition won the elections and Bodha was elected as 1st Member serving for Constituency No 16, Vacoas Floreal. He was appointed as Minister of Tourism & Leisure in the Cabinet of Anerood Jugnauth. Pravind Jugnauth was appointed as Minister of Agriculture. In 2003, Anerood Jugnauth's planned resignation (to become President) and Paul Berenger's appointment as Prime Minister resulted in changes to the cabinet. Pravind Jugnauth became the Deputy Prime Minister and Bodha became the new Minister of Agriculture from 2003 to 2005. During the same period all key decisions within the MSM were made by the triumvirate consisting of Pravind Jugnauth, Nando Bodha, and Showkutally Soodhun.

In July 2005, the MSM/MMM coalition lost the general elections to Alliance Sociale (PTR–PMXD–VF–MR–MMSM). Pravind Jugnauth, leader of the MSM, was not elected and Paul Bérenger thus became Leader of Opposition. In 2006 the MSM-MMM coalition collapsed, making the MSM the second-largest party in the parliament. Thus the leader of the opposition was to be a sitting MP of the MSM. Jugnauth announced that Bodha would hold the office until two MSM MPs left the alliance and regrouped with the Mauritian Labour Party. The MMM became the second-largest party and thus Berenger is once again appointed as Leader of the Opposition.

In 2010, the Ptr-MSM-PMSD alliance won the general elections, and Bodha was appointed as Minister of Tourism but resigned from his position as all other cabinet members of the MSM did. After being elected in the 2014 general elections, he was appointed Minister of Public Infrastructure and Land Transport as from 15 December 2014 to 12 November 2019. He was again elected in the 2019 general elections and was this time appointed as Minister for Foreign Affairs and Regional Integration until 5 February 2021.

On 6 February 2021 Bodha resigned as Minister of Foreign Affairs and as secretary general of the MSM, but remained in the National Assembly as a member of the opposition until October 2024. Bodha explained that he was no longer at ease within the MSM, especially after the final resignation of Anerood Jugnauth in 2017, and after being sidelined by Pravind Jugnauth in favour of Yogida Sawmynaden. In April 2021 Nando Bodha joined forces with Paul Bérenger (MMM), Xavier-Luc Duval (PMSD) and Roshi Bhadain (Reform Party) to form L’Alliance de l’Espoir. But within a month this caused various politicians to leave the PMSD, for example Salim Abbas Mamode. Then on 23 July 2021 Bodha launched his own political party called Rassemblement mauricien at Caudan Arts Centre.

At the 10 November 2024 general elections Nando Bodha was a candidate of Linion Reform, a coalition of 10 different parties (GREA, 100% Citoyens, Mouvement Patriotique, Rassemblement Mauricien, Les Verts Fraternels, Ralliement Citoyen Pour la Patrie, En Avant Moris, Parti Justice Sociale, Parti Justice et vérité, and Reform Party). He was the candidate for the post of prime minister for the first two and a half years to be followed by Roshi Badhain. His running mates at Constituency No.16 Vacoas Floréal were Patrick Philogene and singer Siven Chinien but they were not elected.
