= Atma Doolooa =

Mauritian politician (1952–2013)

Bhawanand Doolooa

Director of State Trading Corporation Director of Development Works Corporation
- In office 1995–2000
- Prime Minister: Navin Ramgoolam

Advisor at Ministry of Commerce and Cooperatives
- In office 2000–2005
- Prime Minister: Anerood Jugnauth

Personal details
- Born: 1952 Flacq, British Mauritius
- Died: 5 August 2013 (aged 61) Mauritius
- Party: MMM; Mouvement Travailleur Mauricien (MTM); Front National Mauricien (FNM)
- Education: Indore University, India

Bhawanand Doolooa, commonly known as Atma Doolooa (1952–2013) was a Mauritian politician and author.

== Early life ==
Atma Doolooa was born in a Hindu Ravived (synonymous of caste Chamar) family in Flacq, British Mauritius. His father Bissoon Doolooa was a Sirdar, that is, a supervisor of labourers, and who was the grandchild of Shree Doolooa who landed in Mauritius from Bihar, India in 1856 as a coolie or indentured labourer who later worked as a tanner at the Constance Manes sugar estate in Flacq. After leaving secondary school he worked in a tavern owned by his father before travelling to India for tertiary studies in Indore in Hotel Management.

== Beginning of activism ==
When he returned to his home country from India in 1980, Doolooa formed Mouvement des Gradués Chômeurs (Unemployed Graduates Organisation) to protest against the high rate of unemployment in Mauritius. He formed part of a group of unemployed university graduates who held a hunger strike for 13 days. A few years later, Doolooa formed part of a delegation to Africa which managed to find 300 jobs for unemployed Mauritian graduates in Zimbabwe.

== Political career ==
During the June 1982 General Elections, he supported the MMM although he was not a candidate.

For the first time in his political career, he stood as candidate of the MMM at the August 1983 elections in Constituency No. 9 - Flacq and Bon Accueil following the breakdown of the MMM-PSM coalition. However, he was not elected as he came out fourth after Dev Kimcurrun, Ajay Daby and Iswurdeo Seetaram in that constituency.

At the 30 August 1987 General Elections, he was once again candidate of the MMM within the L'Union MMM/MTD/FTS but came out fifth, having been defeated by Vinod Bojeenauth, Rajnarain Guttee and Iswurdeo Seetaram of the MSM-Labour coalition.

He subsequently benefitted from various political appointments when the MSM or MMM formed part of the government. These appointments included director of Development Works Corporation (DWC), and head of the State Trading Corporation (STC). Doolooa was part of the Local Government Service Commission (LGSC) before being appointed as advisor for the Minister of Commerce and Cooperatives. On the eve of the 2005 general elections Doolooa resigned from the ministry following disagreement with influential politicians.

On 4 August 2006 he formed a new political party called Mouvement Travailleur Mauricien (MTM). He also founded the Ambedkar Memorial Research Action Trust to assist Indo-Mauritians who were facing poverty.

On 28 January 2009 Atma Doolooa formed another new political party called Front National Mauricien (FNM) with the help of Hassen Rojoa (radio jockey), Prakash Bheeroo (lawyer), Ashley Hurrunghee (lawyer), Vassen Kuppaymootoo (oceanographer), and Anil Gayan (lawyer and former minister).

As he retired from political life Doolooa started a fast-food business in Flacq and started writing books.

== Literary works ==
Doolooa wrote the book Castes in Mauritius, the future of Indians and Hinduism which was published in 2007. It documents the practice of a divisive form of Hindu casteism by Mauritian politicians which differs markedly from the casteism practiced in India. For instance, "Scheduled Castes" in India like the Cahars, Lohars, Tellis, Nonias, Bhuiyas, Bangalis, Doms, Musahars, Junglees and others have all merged into the caste of Vaishyas in Mauritius for political ends.

In 2012 he was planning to publish his second book about the caste system, entitled The dirty indian but this did not eventuate.
