= 1991 Mauritian general election =

← 1987	15 September 1991	1995 →

All 62 directly elected seats in the Legislative Assembly (and up to 8 BLS seats)
- Turnout: 85.41% (▼3.34 pp)
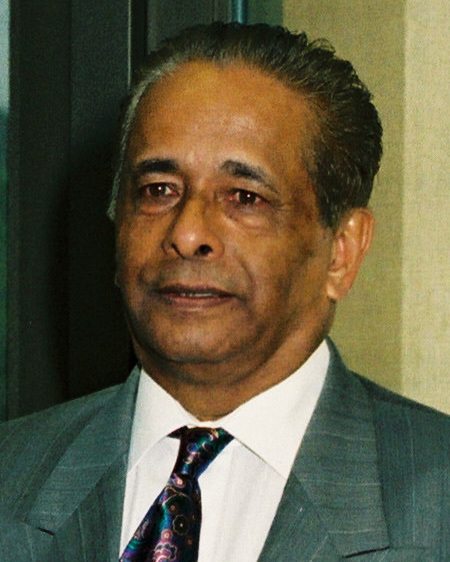

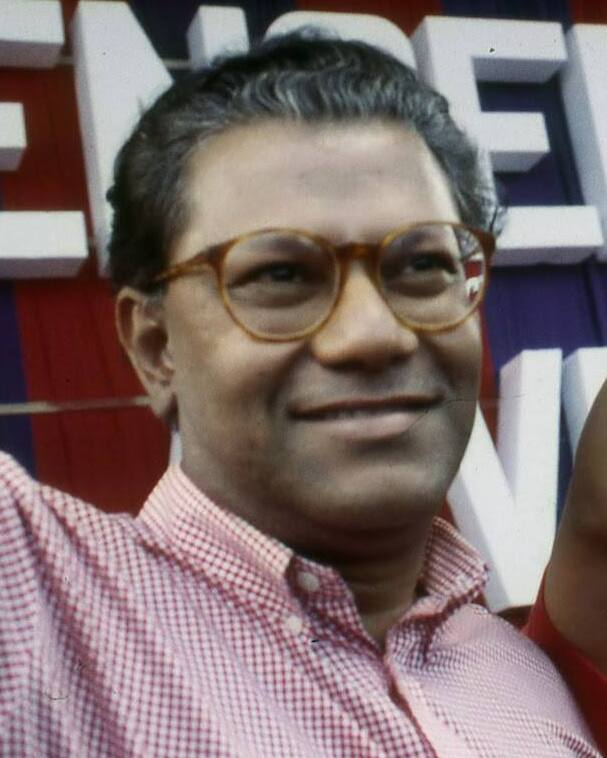
	First party	Second party
Leader	Anerood Jugnauth	Navin Ramgoolam
Party	MSM	PTr
Alliance	MSM/MMM	PTr–PMSD
Alliance seats	57	7
Popular vote	944,521	670,631
Alliance %	55.36%	39.30%
- Alliance result by constituency
Prime Minister before election
Anerood Jugnauth
MSM
Subsequent Prime Minister
Anerood Jugnauth
MSM

General elections were held in Mauritius on 15 September 1991. Three main parties gained seats in this election: the Militant Socialist Movement, Mauritian Militant Movement and the Labour Party. The MSM formed an alliance with the MMM and the Labour Party formed an alliance with the Mauritian Social Democrat Party (PMSD). On 17 September 1991, results showed that MSM-MMM won 57 out of 66 seats. This gave 95% of seats to MSM-MMM leader Anerood Jugnauth and 5% to Labour Party-PMSD leader Navin Ramgoolam.

== Campaign ==
The main political parties taking part in the elections were the Militant Socialist Movement and Labour Party which were the current government, and the Mauritian Militant Movement which was the current opposition party. Earlier that year, Navin Ramgoolam became the leader of the Labour Party. As a result, the MSM-Labour Party coalition broke down in February 1991 because Ramgoolam demanded that the deal between the parties should be reviewed and that the MSM leader, Anerood Jugnauth, should hold the office of Prime Minister for half of the term (two and a half years), with Ramgoolam serving out the remainder of the term. However, Jugnauth did not want to step aside in favour of Ramgoolam. Ramgoolam then announced that his party would contest the elections due September on its own.

Jugnauth proposed an electoral pact with the Mauritian Militant Movement (MMM), the party which Jugnauth himself had formerly led between 1976 and 1983, before the formation of the MSM. The two parties agreed that Anerood Jugnauth would remain Prime Minister for the full term of 5 years and that MMM leader Paul Bérenger would serve in his Cabinet. Bérenger later became Minister of External Affairs.

During the term, Rama Sithanen, Sheila Bappoo and Dharam Gokhool defected from the MSM to the Mauritian Labour Party. The defections put the MSM under increasing strain, and Jugnauth came under pressure to hold general elections in 1995 rather than 1996, as constitutionally scheduled.

== Results ==
Party or alliance		Votes	%	Seats			
Party or alliance		Votes	%	Cons	BL	Total	+/–
MSM–MMM–MTD	Militant Socialist Movement	944,521	55.75	29	0	29	–2
MSM–MMM–MTD	Mauritian Militant Movement	944,521	55.75	26	0	26	+2
MSM–MMM–MTD	Democratic Labour Movement	944,521	55.75	2	0	2	+2
MSM–MMM–MTD	Total	944,521	55.75	57	0	57	+2
PTR–PMSD	Labour Party	670,631	39.59	3	3	6	–3
PTR–PMSD	Mauritian Social Democratic Party	670,631	39.59	0	1	1	–3
PTR–PMSD	Total	670,631	39.59	3	4	7	–6
Rodrigues People's Organisation		16,080	0.95	2	0	2	0
Rodrigues People's Grouping		11,646	0.69	0	0	0	0
Liberal Action Party		6,053	0.36	0	0	0	New
Mauritian People's Party		5,696	0.34	0	0	0	0
Hizbullah		5,550	0.33	0	0	0	New
Militant Workers Party		2,137	0.13	0	0	0	New
Socialist Movement of the South		686	0.04	0	0	0	0
Communist Party of Mauritius		358	0.02	0	0	0	New
Mauritius Party Rights		243	0.01	0	0	0	New
Tamil Fraternity of Mauritius		191	0.01	0	0	0	0
Mauritius United Party		160	0.01	0	0	0	0
People's Democratic Party		121	0.01	0	0	0	New
Independents		30,005	1.77	0	0	0	0
Total		1,694,078	100.00	62	4	66	–4
Valid votes		573,419	98.62				
Invalid/blank votes		8,051	1.38				
Total votes		581,470	100.00				
Registered voters/turnout		680,836	85.41				
Source: Electoral Commission, Nohlen et al., African Elections Database

=== By constituency ===
Constituency		Elected MPs	Party
1	Grand River North West– Port Louis West	Mathieu Laclé	MMM
1	Grand River North West– Port Louis West	Jérôme Boulle	MMM
1	Grand River North West– Port Louis West	Alain Laridon	MSM
2	Port Louis South– Port Louis Central	Ahmad Jeewah	MMM
2	Port Louis South– Port Louis Central	Azize Asgarally	MSM
2	Port Louis South– Port Louis Central	Noël Lee Cheong Lem	MMM
3	Port Louis Maritime– Port Louis East	Cassam Uteem	MMM
3	Port Louis Maritime– Port Louis East	Osman Gendoo	MMM
3	Port Louis Maritime– Port Louis East	Bashir Khodabux	MMM
4	Port Louis North– Montagne Longue	Parmanand Brizmohun	MSM
4	Port Louis North– Montagne Longue	José Arunasalom	MMM
4	Port Louis North– Montagne Longue	Claude Genevieve	MSM
5	Pamplemousses–Triolet	Navin Ramgoolam	PTr
5	Pamplemousses–Triolet	Jyaneshwur Jhurry	MSM
5	Pamplemousses–Triolet	Premdut Koonjoo	MMM
6	Grand Baie–Poudre D'Or	Dharmanand Fokeer	MMM
6	Grand Baie–Poudre D'Or	Madan Dulloo	MSM
6	Grand Baie–Poudre D'Or	Armoogum Parsooraman	MSM
6	Grand Baie–Poudre D'Or	Gaëtan Duval (best loser)	PMSD
7	Piton–Riviere du Rempart	Anerood Jugnauth	MSM
7	Piton–Riviere du Rempart	Dwarkanath Gungah	MSM
7	Piton–Riviere du Rempart	Mahyendrah Utchanah	MSM
8	Quartier Militaire–Moka	Ashok Jugnauth	MSM
8	Quartier Militaire–Moka	Sutyadeo Moutia	MSM
8	Quartier Militaire–Moka	Retnon Pyneeandee	MSM
9	Flacq–Bon Accueil	Anil Bachoo	MTD
9	Flacq–Bon Accueil	Rajnarain Guttee	MSM
9	Flacq–Bon Accueil	Roodrashen Neewoor	MSM
10	Montagne Blanche– Grand River South East	Ramduthsing Jaddoo	MSM
10	Montagne Blanche– Grand River South East	Jagdishwar Goburdhun	MSM
10	Montagne Blanche– Grand River South East	Zeel Peerun	MMM
11	Vieux Grand Port–Rose Belle	Arvin Boolell	PTr
11	Vieux Grand Port–Rose Belle	Satish Dayal	MSM
11	Vieux Grand Port–Rose Belle	Subhas Chandra Lallah	MMM
12	Mahebourg–Plaine Magnien	Vasant Bunwaree	PTr
12	Mahebourg–Plaine Magnien	Ivan Collendavelloo	MMM
12	Mahebourg–Plaine Magnien	Mookhesswur Choonee	MSM
13	Riviere des Anguilles–Souillac	Hurreeprem Aumeer	MSM
13	Riviere des Anguilles–Souillac	Prem Nababsing	MMM
13	Riviere des Anguilles–Souillac	Swalay Kasenally	MMM
14	Savanne–Black River	Alan Ganoo	MMM
14	Savanne–Black River	Germain Comarmond	MSM
14	Savanne–Black River	Sooroojdev Phokeer	MSM
15	La Caverne–Phoenix	Steven Obeegadoo	MMM
15	La Caverne–Phoenix	Iswardeo Seetaram	MSM
15	La Caverne–Phoenix	Showkutally Soodhun	MSM
15	La Caverne–Phoenix	Razack Peeroo (best loser)	PTr
16	Vacoas–Floreal	Sheilabai Bappoo	MSM
16	Vacoas–Floreal	Dharam Gokhool	MMM
16	Vacoas–Floreal	Karl Offmann	MSM
17	Curepipe–Midlands	Amédée Darga	MMM
17	Curepipe–Midlands	Maxime Sauzier	MSM
17	Curepipe–Midlands	Sanjit Teelock	MTD
17	Curepipe–Midlands	Clarel Malherbe (best loser)	PTr
18	Belle Rose–Quatre Bornes	Kailash Ruhee	MMM
18	Belle Rose–Quatre Bornes	Rama Sithanen	MSM
18	Belle Rose–Quatre Bornes	Michael Glover	MSM
19	Stanley–Rose Hill	Jayen Cuttaree	MMM
19	Stanley–Rose Hill	Jean-Claude de l'Estrac	MMM
19	Stanley–Rose Hill	Paul Bérenger	MMM
19	Stanley–Rose Hill	Siddick Chady (best loser)	PTr
20	Beau Bassin–Petite Riviere	Rajesh Bhagwan	MMM
20	Beau Bassin–Petite Riviere	Joceline Minerve	MMM
20	Beau Bassin–Petite Riviere	Régis Finette	MSM
21	Rodrigues	Serge Clair	OPR
21	Rodrigues	Joseph Jolicoeur	OPR
Source: Government of Mauritius
