= MSM/MMM =

Political party in Mauritius

- Founders: Anerood Jugnauth; Paul Bérenger
- Founded: 1991 (MSM/MMM); 1997 (Fédération); 2000 (MSM/MMM); 2012 (Remake 2000)
- Dissolved: 1993 (MSM/MMM); 1998 (Fédération); 2005 (MSM/MMM); 2012 (Remake 2000)
- Ideology: Social democracy
- Political position: Centre-left
- Coalition members: Militant Socialist Movement; Mauritian Militant Movement
- Colours: Orange; White; Purple

The MSM/MMM was a political alliance formed by the Militant Socialist Movement and the Mauritian Militant Movement, which governed Mauritius from 1991 to 1993 and again from 2000 to 2005. The alliance contested under three general elections during its existence: 1991, 2000 and 2005. The MSM/MMM alliance has dissolved and reformed several times since its first inception in 1991, contesting in municipal and local council elections since then.

The second coalition was known as the "Medpoint Deal" and was formed by former Prime Minister and President Sir Anerood Jugnauth on 14 August 2000. It was the most famous political alliance that Mauritian Politics ever had. It was the first time that the country was experiencing a social change, Paul Berenger would become prime minister out of this deal and would be the first-non Hindu to hold such powerful post.

The deal was to join the two leaders of the two parties. The MSM leader Sir Anerood Jugnauth & MMM leader Paul Berenger. As a misconception and with a battle for the leadership of the MSM after Sir Anerood retired, Pravind Jugnauth and Ashok Jugnauth both fought to become the party's next leader. At the end Ashock moved out and formed his own party namely National Union (UN) and went forward with Paul Berenger and formed the new alliance MMM/UN. In July 2005, the MSM/MMM coalition went together for general elections and became the opposition party, but in 2006 they ended the deal and MSM became alone party while MMM took hands with UN.

== Participating parties ==
Party		General			Municipal		
Party		1991	2000	2005	2001	2005	2012
Party		MSM/MMM			MSM/MMM		
MSM	Militant Socialist Movement	Yes	Yes	Yes	Yes	Yes	Yes
MMM	Mauritian Militant Movement	Yes	Yes	Yes	Yes	Yes	Yes
MTD	Democratic Labour Movement	Yes	No	No	No	No	No
PMSD	Parti Mauricien Social Démocrate	No	Yes	Yes	Yes	Yes	No
VF	Les Verts Fraternels	No	Yes	No	Yes	No	No
MR	Republican Movement	No	Yes	No	No	No	No

== First alliance (1991) ==
=== Candidates (1991) ===
Candidate names highlighted in green indicate elected candidates, yellow indicates that the candidate was elected via the best loser provisions and red unsuccessful candidates neither elected nor chosen for the best loser seats.

Constituency		Candidate 1		Candidate 2		Candidate 3	
1	GRNO–Port-Louis Ouest	Mathieu Laclé	MMM	Jerôme Boulle	MMM	Alain Laridon	MSM
2	Port-Louis Sud–Port-Louis Centre	Ahmad Jeewah	MMM	Azize Asgarally	MSM	Noël Lee Cheong Lem	MMM
3	Port-Louis Maritime–Port-Louis Est	Cassam Uteem	MMM	Osman Gendoo	MMM	Bashir Khodabux	MMM
4	Port-Louis Nord–Montagne Longue	Parmanand Brizmohun	MSM	José Arunasalom	MMM	Claude Genevieve	MSM
5	Pamplemousses–Triolet	Jyaneshwur Jhurry	MSM	Prem Koonjoo	MMM	Vishwanath Sajadah	MSM
6	Grand Baie–Poudre d'Or	Dharmanand Fokeer	MMM	Madan Dulloo	MSM	Armoogum Parsuramen	MSM
7	Piton–Rivière du Rempart	Anerood Jugnauth	MSM	Dwarkanath Gungah	MSM	Mahen Utchanah	MSM
8	Quartier Militaire–Moka	Ashock Jugnauth	MSM	Sutyadeo Moutia	MSM	Retnon Pyneeadnee	MSM
9	Flacq–Bon Accueil	Anil Bachoo	MTD	Rajnarain Guttee	MSM	Roodrashen Neewoor	MSM
10	Montagne Blanche–GRSE	Ramduth Jaddoo	MSM	Jagdishwar Goburdhun	MSM	Zeel Peerun	MMM
11	Vieux Grand Port–Rose Belle	Satish Dayal	MSM	Subhas Lallah	MMM	Anandisswar Choolun	MSM
12	Mahébourg–Plaine Magnien	Ivan Collendavelloo	MMM	Rajesh Choonee	MSM	Madhusudan Conhyedoss	MSM
13	Rivière des Anguilles–Souillac	Hurreeprem Aumeer	MSM	Prem Nababsing	MMM	Swalay Kasenally	MMM
14	Savanne–Rivière Noire	Alan Ganoo	MMM	Germain Comarmond	MSM	Sooroojdev Phokeer	MSM
15	La Caverne–Phœnix	Steven Obeegadoo	MMM	Iswardeo Seetaram	MSM	Showkutally Soodhun	MSM
16	Vacoas–Floréal	Sheila Bappoo	MSM	Dharam Gokhool	MMM	Karl Offmann	MSM
17	Curepipe–Midlands	Amédée Darga	MMM	Maxime Sauzier	MSM	Sanjit Teelock	MTD
18	Belle Rose–Quatre Bornes	Kailash Ruhee	MMM	Rama Sithanen	MSM	Michael Glover	MSM
19	Stanley–Rose Hill	Jayen Cuttaree	MMM	Jean-Claude de l'Estrac	MMM	Paul Bérenger	MMM
20	Beau Bassin–Petite Rivière	Rajesh Bhagwan	MMM	Joceline Minerve	MMM	Régis Finette	MSM

== Second alliance (2000–2005) ==
=== MedPoint deal ===
Sir Anerood Jugnauth who was prime minister from 1982 to 1995 initiated the deal in early 2000. In 1995 the 60-0 victory of the MMM-MLP was outstanding as Sir Jugnauth lost his parliament seat. He had no choice to give more to the MMM so as to secure his party. Mauritian Labor Party and Mauritian Militant Movement began an alliance in 1995 and ousted the MSM out of the game.

Under the transition Navin Ramgoolam, leader of MLP, became prime minister for the five years and MMM leader Paul Berenger remained as Deputy Prime Minister for the five-year term. Sir Anerood offered Berenger more so as to attract him to form the coalition.

He therefore offered Berenger two years of being prime minister, a higher price than being Deputy for five years. He accepted and both signed the deal in August 2000.

The Medpoint Deal was based on equal power shared by both parties and the office of the Prime Minister being head of government was in the ratio 3:2. MSM would have the office for three years and MMM for the two remaining.

Sir Anerood had announced that he will be retiring as prime minister and that his last mandate would be the 2000 elections. He also initiated the idea that his son Pravind Jugnauth would become Leader of the MSM and he would stood down so as to make way for his son for the office of the Prime Minister.

Paul Berenger agreed that he would be appointed as Deputy Prime Minister and Minister of Finance for 3 years, and after that he would succeed to Sir Anerood who was to be dismissing from office during the same period.

There were four main persons concerned out the deal made in 2000. Sir Anerood Jugnauth, Paul Berenger, Pravind Jugnauth and Karl Offmann.

Then President of the Republic, Cassam Uteem was at his last mandate as Head of State and was due to leave office in 2002. Karl Offmann who was a former Minister and Member of the MSM agreed to succeed to Uteem and it was on one condition, that he would work as president only when Sir Anerood Jugnauth would be prime minister. Therefore, the leaders were both aware that Offmann would not have five years mandate as president but less.

The deal also mentioned that as from September 2003, Pravind Jugnauth was to be appointed as Deputy Prime Minister and Finance . All those four people were playing the political prepared game and everyone was trained like a soldier on battlefield so as to snatch the government of the hands of Navin Ramgoolam who was then prime minister.

=== General election and victory ===
On 11 September 2000, the MSM/MMM team won over the general elections with a bigger majority that they had themselves expected. They had won 56 seats out of 60 seats in the parliament.

Sir Anerood Jugnauth was elected 1st Member of Piton & Riviere du Rempart and Paul Berenger elected 1st Member of Upper Rose Hill. They both began their deal and set up the new government with based equal power to both Parties.

The new government elected Sir Jugnauth as prime minister as mentioned in the deal.

=== Rotation (2003) ===
As expected, the two parties were friends with each other and also shared same power. In September 2003, Sir Jugnauth announced his departure and resignation as prime minister and Leader of the MSM in order to let Pravind become Leader.

He accepted to step down in favor of Paul Berenger. Cassam Uteem resigned 6 months before his mandate ended and the entire deal was taking a new turn.

Nevertheless, Karl Offmann took office earlier that year and as mentioned accepted to only work with Sir Jugnauth. Berenger on his part announced that he entering the Clarisse House (House of the Prime Minister) would be meaning political democracy and freedom as to allow a non-Hindu to hold the office of prime minister.

Sir Anerood Jugnauth made another deal within the MSM/MMM deal in 2003. He did not need to resign from office but for the sake of his son he accepted his departure.

This deal was made upon the leadership of Jugnauth and Offmann who were both Head of State and Head of government. Karl Offmann agreed to step down as president in favor that Sir Anerood became his successor. In order to become prime minister, Paul Berenger had to announce the nomination of Jugnauth for president to the Parliament as well as elect his son Pravind as Deputy Prime Minister.

The deal was settled and SAJ announced in early September that he will be resigning as prime minister, but that the population would not have to worry for the upcoming years as he would become president after some time.

He resigned in September 2003 and Berenger took office of prime minister and nominated Jugnauth as president. After one week, in the start of October, Sir Anerood Jugnauth became president and also head of state.

== Third alliance (2012) ==
The coalition has been reformed in April 2012 after an electoral agreement between the Militant Socialist Movement (MSM) and Mauritian Militant Movement (MMM) was made with Sir Anerood Jugnauth as leader. The agreements remain the same, 30 seats for the MMM and 30 seats for the MSM. It has also been conveyed that SAJ would be prime minister for 3 years and Paul Berenger would take over for the rest of the parliamentary term if the coalition wins the next general elections. It has also been agreed that Pravind Jugnauth who is leader of the MSM will not be in the Front Bench of the coalition in an eventual government of the MSM/MMM. This is because he has been provisionally charged with using office for gratification by the Independent Commission Against Corruption. He will therefore seat as a back-bencher until he is dismissed from all accusations.

The MMM/MSM coalition won the local council elections held on 9 December 2012. They obtained a total of 53 councilors against 36 for the government party Mauritian Labour Party and one for the Mauritian Movement Social Democrats. They will therefore administer the cities namely Port-Louis, Quatre Bornes and Rose Hill while the only city administered by the government will be Vacoas-Phoenix. The city of Curepipe is under a deadlock with 7 councillors elected from the MMM/MSM coalition, 7 councillors elected under the banner of the Labour Party and 1 elected under the Mauritian Movement Social Democrats. The deadlock will therefore be handled as soon as negotiations are made and an agreement is obtained.
