= Karl Offmann =

3rd President of Mauritius from 2002 to 2003

The Honourable Karl Offmann GCSK
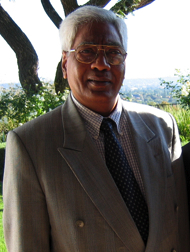
- Offmann in 2005

President of Mauritius
- In office 25 February 2002 – 7 October 2003
- Prime Minister: Anerood Jugnauth; Paul Bérenger
- Vice President: Raouf Bundhun
- Preceded by: Ariranga Pillay (acting)
- Succeeded by: Anerood Jugnauth

Personal details
- Born: 25 November 1940 Port Louis, British Mauritius
- Died: 12 March 2022 (aged 81)
- Party: Militant Socialist Movement
- Spouse: Marie Moutou
- Children: Gilles Bernard; Hans Eric

Karl Auguste Offmann (25 November 1940 – 12 March 2022) was a Mauritian politician who briefly served as the president of Mauritius from 2002 to 2003.

After two of his successive predecessors had resigned over their refusal to sign a controversial anti-terrorism bill, the parliament elected Offmann to serve as the third president on 25 February 2002. He served in the post until Paul Bérenger became his prime minister and nominated a new president on 1 October 2003.

== Educational and professional background ==
Because secondary education was not free, his family could not afford to meet the costs of education for seven children. Thus, when he completed primary school education, he chose to compete for a scholarship in order to pursue his studies further. He won the government-awarded mechanical Engineering Apprenticeship Scholarship in 1956 and secured a seat at the prestigious Royal College School and the Technical College of Floreal. To acquire practical knowledge and experience, he was trained at the Mauritius Railways Department where he stayed up to 1963. In that same year, he was approached by the team of the Daily Express to work as a technician in the composition sector. He worked for the paper until 1979 when he was offered the post of Director of Father Laval's Printing, a company owned by the Roman Catholic Diocese of Port-Louis and for which he worked until 1983. From 1983 to 1986 he was Director of the Daily Socialist, a publication which belonged to a political party. In 1975, he obtained the Diploma of Political and Social Sciences at Claver House, London.

== Social work ==
Offman joined the Joint Ocean Commission Initiative in 1957, where he became deeply involved in the overall strategy of the movement with regard to its information campaign and training programme. The programme was in favour of the working youth of the Indian Ocean Islands and on the African Continent as well on the international scene.

In 1964, he was selected by the Mauritian Branch of the JOCI to participate in the first International Training Course. It committed him to fight illiteracy, poverty other social evils on the international plane.

On his return from this training course in 1965, he was appointed Member of the Commission of African Studies. From 1966 to 1968, he was responsible for coordinating JOCI activities within the Indian Ocean Islands and from 1966 to 1969, he was a Member of the African Team and of the executive committee. It was only during the period 1966 to 1969, while he was the coordinator of activities within the Indian Ocean Islands that he took two years’ leave from in order to devote himself fully to social and voluntary work. One of the highlights of this period was the Meeting of the JOCI Indian Ocean Islands in 1967 which was attended by, among others, a South African delegate during the days of apartheid. Another significant event was the first Meet of the African Continent in Yaoundé, Cameroon in 1968, which was organised exclusively by the African Team of the JOCI, composed of African delegates including himself. The others were France Tévi Sedalo, Mathias Dossoumon and Frédéric Jean Njougla. For its preparation, he put in his personal efforts for three-and-a-half months, working in situ.

After his marriage in 1969, he left the JOCI and the Bishop of Port-Louis entrusted to him the Presidency of the Commission of Lay Apostolate in Mauritius. While working in the Daily Express, he promoted the diocese. His position, though very favourable professionally and financially, did not fit his aspirations and his JOCI experience.

== Political career ==
Offmann was a full-time politician from 1976 to 2002. At the 1976 General Elections he was a candidate of Guy Ollivry's party, the Union Démocratique Mauricienne (UDM), in Constituency No. 1 Grand River North West and Port Louis West but he was defeated by his rivals of the MMM (Jack Bizlall, Jerome Boulle and Rajnee Dyalah). He left the UDM and stood as candidate of Harish Boodhoo's party Parti Socialiste Mauricien (PSM) in 1978. At the June 1982 General Elections he was a candidate of the MMM-PSM coalition in Constituency No. 17 Curepipe Midlands where he was elected for the first time as a member of the Legislative Assembly. At the August 1983 General Elections he was elected as a member of the MSM-Labour Party coalition in Constituency No.16 Vacoas Floréal. At the 1987 General Elections he was not elected after standing as candidate of the MSM-Labour coalition in Constituency No.16, but was deemed to be one of the 8 Best Losers. In September 1991 he was elected in Constituency No.16 as candidate of MSM-MMM coalition, defeating his rivals Sir Gaetan Duval, Marie-France Roussety and Motteepath Fowdur. But as a candidate of the MSM-RMM Coalition at the 1995 General Elections he was defeated in the same Constituency by his rivals Lallah, Sakaram, and Arouff-Parfait of the Labour-MMM coalition.

He served successively as Minister of Economic Planning and Development (August 1983), Minister of Local Government and Cooperatives (1984 – 1986), Minister of Social Security, National Solidarity and Reform Institutions (January 1988 – 1991) and as Government Chief Whip (1988 – 1991). From 1987 to 1991, he was General Secretary of the MSM which he helped to set up, and from 1996 to February 2000, he served as party leader.

One of his first missions in Washington (as Minister of Economic Planning and Development) was to convince the World Bank and the International Monetary Fund to not press for drastic reductions in the Civil Service Staff and not do away with free education and free health services. Today, 44% of the overall wealth produced goes back to the people in the form of free education and Health Services, Social Security and other social services like Youth and Sports, Women's Rights, Co-operatives, Housing, Arts and Culture etc.

=== President ===
In February 2002, he was elected president by the National Assembly which he held until October 2003.

== Awards and decorations ==
- Mauritius:
  - Grand Commander of the Order of the Star and Key of the Indian Ocean (2002)

== Personal life and death ==
Offmann was married to Marie Rose Danielle Moutou and they had two sons, Gilles Bernard and Hans Erick. Both are married. He was grandfather of Paul Alexandre, Mark Philip, Victoria, Adriana and Chloe.

Offmann died on 12 March 2022, at the age of 81.

Political offices
Preceded by Ariranga Pillay; Acting	President of Mauritius; 2002 – 2003	Succeeded by Anerood Jugnauth
