= Jack Bizlall =

Mauritian politician

Member of Parliament (MP)
- In office 20 December 1976 – 11 June 1982

Personal details
- Born: 23 July 1946 (age 79) Médine, Mauritius
- Party: MMM, Parti Militan Travayer (PMT)
- Occupation: Teacher and Trade Unionist

Jack Bizlall (born 23 July 1946) is a trade unionist, teacher and former elected member of parliament (MP) of Mauritius. He is also known as Jacques Brizlall.

== Early life and career ==
Jack Bizlall grew up in Médine. His first name was given to him in honour of his father's friend who was killed in action as a soldier during World War II. Although he wanted to become a priest he trained to become a primary school teacher. He taught at St. François school (Baie-du-Cap) and Notre Dame de la Paix school. He left the teaching profession in 1976 as he was frustrated by the poor objectives of the educational system.

His wife encouraged him to take up trade unionism after the birth of their daughter Véronique. From 1972 to 1976 he was an active member of the Federation of Civil Service Union (FCSU). From 1976 to 1980 he was a prominent activist within the General Workers’ Federation (GWF). Since 1980 he has been a member of the Federation of Progressive Unions (FPU). He was also involved in the creation of other trade unions such as the Women’s League for Alternative Feminist Action. He is also member of the National Minimum Wage Consultative Council.

== Political career ==
At the 1976 general elections, as a candidate of Mouvement Militant Mauricien (MMM), Jack Bizlall was elected at the top of the list to the Legislative Assembly in Constituency No. 1 (Grand River North West and Port Louis West). His running mates of the MMM who were also elected in the same constituency were Jerome Boulle and Rajnee Dyalah. However Bizlall started to distance himself from the MMM by 1981 as the party started to adopt a different ideology.

At the 1991 general elections he stood as candidate of Parti Militan Travayer (PMT) in Constituency No. 1 (Grand River North West and Port Louis West) but he was not elected, as candidates Boulle, Laclé and Laridon of the MSM-MMM coalition were victorious. At the October 1992 by-elections in Constituency No. 3 (Port Louis Maritime and Port Louis East) he was defeated by Essoof of the MSM-MMM coalition. Bizlall also took part in the 1995 by-elections as candidate of Lalit-PMT but was defeated by Paul Bérenger. At the 2014 general elections Bizlall was candidate of the EDP in Constituency No.20 (Beau Bassin and Petite Rivière) but was not elected. At the December 2017 by-elections in Constituency No. 18 (Belle Rose and Quatre Bornes) Bizlall was candidate but was defeated by Arvin Boolell.

== Trade unionism and whistle blower ==
In 2001 Bizlall was the whistle blower who brought to light the Caisse Noire Affair as Robert Rivalland, former director of Rogers Aviation, accused Bizlall of defamation. In response Bizlall revealed all details of the politico-financial scandal.
