= Veda Baloomoody =

Mauritian politician and barrister

The Honourable Veda Baloomoody
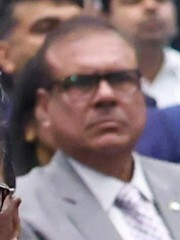

Deputy Speaker of the National Assembly
- Incumbent
- Assumed office 29 November 2024

Deputy Mayor of Curepipe
- In office 1988–1989

Municipal Councillor of Curepipe
- In office 1985–1991

Chairperson of the Public Accounts Committee
- In office March 2016 – December 2017

Personal details
- Party: Mauritian Militant Movement
- Education: University of Birmingham (BA Hons Economics) Middle Temple (Barrister-at-Law)
- Profession: Barrister

Vedasingam Vasudevachariar Baloomoody (also known as Veda Baloomoody or Veda Balamoody) is a Mauritian politician and barrister from the Mauritian Militant Movement (MMM). Since November 2024, he has served as Deputy Speaker of the National Assembly. He represents constituency No. 18 (Belle Rose and Quatre Bornes) in the National Assembly.

== Early life and education ==
Baloomoody obtained a Bachelor of Arts with Honours in Economics from the University of Birmingham in the United Kingdom. He subsequently qualified as a Barrister-at-Law at the Middle Temple, one of the four Inns of Court in London.

== Legal career ==
Baloomoody was called to the Mauritian Bar in August 1984 and has practised continuously as a barrister for over 40 years. Throughout his legal career, he has served as legal advisor to various trade unions and has represented workers on a pro bono basis in numerous cases. He has also served as Pupil Master to several barristers, some of whom have gone on to hold positions at the Director of Public Prosecutions' Office, the Attorney General's Office, and the Judiciary.

== Political career ==
=== Local government ===
Baloomoody began his political career in local government, serving as a Municipal Councillor for Curepipe from 1985 to 1991. He served as Deputy Mayor of Curepipe for the year 1988 to 1989.

=== National Assembly ===
Baloomoody has been elected to the National Assembly on five occasions: in 1995, 2000, 2010, 2014, and 2024. In the 2024 general election, he stood as a candidate for the Alliance Du Changement in constituency No. 18 (Belle Rose and Quatre Bornes) and was elected with 28,796 votes.

=== Deputy Speaker ===
On 29 November 2024, Baloomoody was elected Deputy Speaker of the National Assembly. Upon his election, he pledged to work impartially and to uphold the dignity of Parliament. In this role, he also serves as Chairman of House when the Speaker is not presiding.

In April 2025, Baloomoody represented Mauritius at the launch of the Parlement Régional des Jeunes de l'Indianocéanie (PRJIO) in Seychelles. In his address, he emphasised the strategic importance of involving youth in political processes.

=== Chairperson of the Public Accounts Committee ===
From March 2016 to December 2017, Baloomoody served as Chairperson of the Public Accounts Committee, the principal parliamentary body responsible for examining government expenditure and ensuring fiscal accountability.

== International and regional parliamentary activities ==
Baloomoody has been active in regional and international parliamentary affairs, particularly in Southern Africa and the Indian Ocean. He has held the following positions:

- Member of the Commonwealth Parliamentary Association (Africa Region).
- Member of the SADC Parliamentary Forum (SADCPF), serving as its Treasurer for two years.
- Member of the African Parliamentarians Network Against Corruption (AFROPAC) in 2016.
- He has served as an international election observer in several African countries, including:South Africa, Botswana, Comoros, Malawi, Mozambique and other SADC member states.

Baloomoody has also attended numerous international conferences on democracy, human rights and good governance.

Preceded by Position established	Deputy Speaker of the National Assembly; 29 November 2024 – present	Incumbent
