= Parti Mauricien Social Démocrate =

Political party in Mauritius

Mauritian Social Democratic Party Parti Mauricien Social Démocrate Parti Sosial Demokratik Morisien
- Abbreviation: PMSD
- Leader: Xavier-Luc Duval MP
- President: Maurice Allet
- Founder: Jules Koenig
- Founded: 6 April 1955
- Ideology: Conservatism; Liberal conservatism Nationalism; Right-wing populism Francophilia; Franco-Mauritian interests Creole interests Historical: Civic nationalism Social democracy British unionism
- Political position: Centre-right to right-wing Historical: Centre-left
- National affiliation: Alliance Lepep
- International affiliation: Centrist Democrat International
- Colours: Blue and White
- National Assembly: 1 / 66

Website
- lepmsd.com

The Mauritian Social Democratic Party (PMSD, French: Parti Mauricien Social Démocrate; Morisyen: Parti Sosial Demokratik Morisien), also known as the Mauritian Conservative Party (French: Parti Conservateur Mauricien; Morisyen: Parti Konservater Morisien), is a political party in Mauritius. Conservative and Francophilic, the PMSD is the fourth biggest political party in the National Assembly and currently forms part of the opposition.

Founded under the name Parti Mauricien by Jules Koenig in 1955/ The PMSD is one of the oldest political parties in the country still active. Anti-independence and advocating a form of departmentalization on the model of La Réunion in the 1960s, it emerged from the Mauritius Rally founded by Koenig in 1953, whose rhetoric castigated the potential "Hindu hegemony" which would result from independence and replace "the dominant Western, Christian and liberal model on the economic level, and establish an Indian Hindu-socialist society .

A party traditionally associated with the white and Creole minorities in the context of Mauritian consociational democracy, it has experienced a major decline since the 1970s and the emergence of the Mauritian Militant Movement (MMM) of Paul Bérenger, obtaining only 7 elected representatives during the elections of December 21, 1976 against 30 for the MMM. Several times in power within alliances necessary due to the Westminster system inherited from the British, he was defeated in the 2019 legislative elections within the National Alliance (PTr/PMSD/Jean-Claude Barbier Movement)

Socially conservative — even if the party is known for having historically led the fight against the death penalty —, favorable to economic liberalism — but officially social-democracy and francophile obedience, the PMSD is associated with the Duval family.

The current leader is Xavier-Luc Duval, former Minister of Finance and former Leader of the Parliamentary Opposition. Following the resignation of Arvin Boolell, Xavier-Luc Duval returned to the position of leader of the parliamentary opposition on March 4, 2021.

== History ==
The origins of the PMSD date back to the conservative Parti de L'Ordre. Several decades later Jules Koenig resurrected the party in the form of Union Mauricienne from 1946 to 1953 before being re-branded to Ralliement Mauricien prior to the 1953 Legislative Council Elections. Koenig changed the party's name to Parti Mauricien after its defeat at the 1953 elections. Gaëtan Duval further modified the party's name to Parti Mauricien Social Démocrate (PMSD) after he succeeded to Jules Koenig as the party's leader. With its origins dating back to 1946 it is one of the oldest surviving parties in the country. Sir Gaetan Duval led the party from 1967 to 1995. The PMSD is known as the only significant political party which violently opposed the independence from Great Britain by hosting a deadly campaign of anti-Hindu propaganda in the 1960s which led to the 1965 Mauritius race riots, 1967 Port Louis riots, and 1968 Mauritian riots. Its traditional following comes from the minority communities (Creoles, Chinese and Whites) and some Muslims.

== Popularity and new leadership ==
However, with the advent of the newly formed Mauritian Militant Movement (MMM) in the 1970s, PMSD started to lose popularity. It won 23 seats in the pre-Independence 1967 general elections; at the 1976 elections, it retained only 7 (plus an eighth indirectly elected member). Despite this apparent shrinkage in its base the PMSD managed to form part of ruling government from 1976 to 1982 after contracting an alliance with the Labour Party after the 1976 elections.

Soon after the 1968 Independence there was disagreement within the PMSD, which formed part of most of the Opposition in Parliament, regarding the growing rapprochement between the PMSD leader Sir Gaëtan Duval and the Labour leader Sir Seewoosagur Ramgoolam. As a result, in 1969 a splinter group was formed within PMSD and it was led by Maurice Lesage and Guy Ollivry who had been prominent figures of the PMSD. As a result, Maurice Lesage, Guy Ollivry, Raymond Rivet, Cyril Leckning, Clément Roussety and others left PMSD and created their own party, the Union Démocratique Mauricienne (UDM) which remained active for a number of years thereafter.

In the 1990s Gaëtan Duval left PMSD and formed his own splinter party called Parti Gaëtan Duval. In 1999 Xavier-Luc Duval also left PMSD to form his new party Parti Mauricien Xavier Duval.

In 2000 the PMSD formed part of the historical MSM/MMM alliance as a minority party. It joined the Labour Party-led Social Alliance, which included other allies.

In 2009 the PMSD merged with the Parti Mauricien Xavier Duval (PMXD) and retained its old name "PMSD". However Xavier-Luc Duval became leader and Maurice Allet became president of the party. The PMSD renewed its focus on the Mauritian Creole community and remained a close ally of the Mauritian Labour Party.

In the lead up to elections of 2014, however, the PMSD joined the Alliance Lepep, a coalition comprising the Militant Socialist Movement, the Muvman Liberater, and itself. It won 11 seats.

Leading to the November 2019 elections the PMSD joined forces with its historical ally Labour Party and Mouvement Jean Claude Barbier (a splinter group from Alan Ganoo's Mouvement Patriotique) to form an alliance called "Alliance Nationale". This alliance secured 14 seats in the Parliament.

At the 2024 elections the PMSD joined the MSM, the Muvman Liberater, Muvman Patriot Morisien and Plateforme Militante in the Alliance Lepep but was defeated. Only one of its candidates, Adrien Duval, secured a seat in the Mauritius National Assembly after being nominated as best loser.

== Election results ==
=== Legislative elections ===
Election	Leader	Coalition			Seats	+/–	Position	Status
Election	Leader	Parties	Votes	%	Seats	+/–	Position	Status
1959	Jules Koenig	—N/a			3 / 40	▲3	▲4th	Opposition
1963	Jules Koenig	—N/a			8 / 40	▲5	▲2nd	Opposition
1967	Gaëtan Duval	—N/a	354,193	43.53	27 / 70	▲19	2nd	Coalition (1967–1973)
1967	Gaëtan Duval	—N/a	354,193	43.53	27 / 70	▲19	2nd	Opposition (1973–1976)
1976	Gaëtan Duval	—N/a	200,559	16.53	8 / 70	▲19	▼3rd	Coalition
1982	Gaëtan Duval	—N/a	120,214	8.36	2 / 66	▼6	▼4th	Opposition
1983	Gaëtan Duval	PMSD–MSM–PTr	140,864	10.20	5 / 70	▲3	4th	Coalition
1987	Gaëtan Duval	PMSD–MSM–PTr	141,878	8.50	4 / 70	▼1	4th	Coalition (1987–1988)
1987	Gaëtan Duval	PMSD–MSM–PTr	141,878	8.50	4 / 70	▼1	4th	Opposition (1988–1991)
1991	Gaëtan Duval	PMSD–PTr	670,631	39.30	1 / 66	▼3	▼5th	Opposition (1991–1995)
1991	Gaëtan Duval	PMSD–PTr	670,631	39.30	1 / 66	▼3	▼5th	Coalition (1995)
1991	Gaëtan Duval	PMSD–PTr	670,631	39.30	1 / 66	▼3	▼5th	Opposition (1995)
1995	Xavier-Luc Duval	Did not contest						No seats
2000	Hervé Duval and Maurice Allet	PMSD–MSM–MMM	15,948	0.86	1 / 70	▲1	▲9th	Coalition
2005	Hervé Duval and Maurice Allet	PMSD–MSM–MMM	15,769	0.80	1 / 70	Steady	9th	Opposition
2010	Xavier-Luc Duval	PMSD–PTR–MSM	97,239	4.82	4 / 69	▲4	▲4th	Coalition
2014	Xavier-Luc Duval	PMSD–MSM–ML	181,305	8.89	10 / 69	▲6	▼5th	Coalition (2014–2016)
2014	Xavier-Luc Duval	PMSD–MSM–ML	181,305	8.89	10 / 69	▲6	▼5th	Opposition (2016–2019)
2019	Xavier-Luc Duval	PMSD–PTr–MJCB	136,144	6.37	5 / 70	▼5	▲4th	Opposition
2024	Xavier-Luc Duval	PMSD–MSM–MPM–ML–PM	75,243	3.21	1 / 66	▼4	▼8th	Opposition
