= Alliance de l'Avenir =

Political coalition in Mauritius

- Founder: Anerood Jugnauth (as Alliance); Navin Ramgoolam (as Alliance de l'Avenir)
- Founded: 1983 (as Alliance); 2010 (as Alliance de l'Avenir)
- Dissolved: 1990 (as Alliance); 2011 (as Alliance de l'Avenir)
- Ideology: Social democracy Progressivism
- Political position: Centre-left
- Coalition members: Labour Party; Militant Socialist Movement; Parti Mauricien Social Démocrate
- Colours: Blue; White; Red
- Slogan: Lavenir ensam (English: "Future Together")

Website
- bleublancrouge.mu (archived)

The Alliance de l'Avenir (French: Alliance of the Future), also referred to as the Blue-White-Red alliance, was a political alliance in Mauritius which was formed in 2010 for the next parliamentary elections which were held on 5 May 2010. It is an alliance of the Labour Party, Mouvement Socialiste Militant and Parti Mauricien Social Démocrate. It was formed by the prime minister Dr. Navin Ramgoolam and is led by three other people, namely Rashid Beebeejaun, Xavier-Luc Duval and Pravind Jugnauth.

The party alliance won the general elections held on 5 May 2010 and is the majority alliance and forms the government of Mauritius, where the largest party is the Labour Party, with 27 MPs in all and headed by Prime Minister Navin Ramgoolam and is followed by the Militant Socialist Movement with 14 MPs and is headed by Pravind Jugnauth who became Vice Prime Minister following the alliance.

The Mauritian Social Democrat Party has 4 MPs and the leader Xavier-Luc Duval is also Vice Prime Minister. The party has been kept for ethnic representation as alone the labour and MSM have absolute majority by 41 seats on 69. The Labour Party is an aristocratic movement headed by mostly Hindus and the MSM is a Vaish-dominant party which competes for the Hindu vote. Having two parties with Hindu majority was not perceived as representing the whole population and ethnic minorities. The Social Democrats, which is a Christian majority party, has therefore paved its way to form part of the government.

== Participating parties ==
Party		1983	1987	2010
Party		Alliance	Alliance	Alliance de l'Avenir
PTr	Labour Party	Yes	Yes	Yes
MSM	Militant Socialist Movement	Yes	Yes	Yes
PMSD	Parti Mauricien Social Démocrate	Yes	Yes	Yes

== History ==
=== First alliance ===
The First alliance between the Labour Party, MSM and PMSD was made in 1983 by then Prime Minister Anerood Jugnauth. The main party in parliament was the MMM and it had defected the Labour Party with the 1982 elections with no labour candidate was elected to parliament.

After having conflicts with Paul Berenger, Jugnauth resigned as Prime Minister but however dissolved the National Assembly on the same just hours before announcing his resignation. He formed the new party, namely MSM with the help of the Socialist Mauritian Party of Harish Boodhoo and some other members of the MMM who approved of his policies.

Seewoosagur Ramgoolam, leader of the Labour Party had reached his 83rd birthday and could not stand as prime minister candidate for Labour. Instead they contracted an alliance with the MSM of Jugnauth obtaining 35 ticket allocation and the Labour 15 tickets. They made an electoral pact with the PMSD and agreed to not put any Labour-MSM candidate for the resting of 60 seats. PMSD eventually got the 12 resting tickets.

The results was of MSM having 29 MPs, the Labour having 9 MPs and the PSMD left with 3 MPs. They formed the government with 45 MPs in all with Sir Anerood Jugnauth as Prime Minister, Sir Seewoosagur Ramgoolam as Governor General, Gaetan Duval as Deputy Prime Minister and new leader of the Labour, Sir Satcam Boolell became Minister of Foreign Affairs.
