= Éric Guimbeau =

Mauritian politician (1960–2024)

Éric Joseph Raoul Guimbeau GOSK
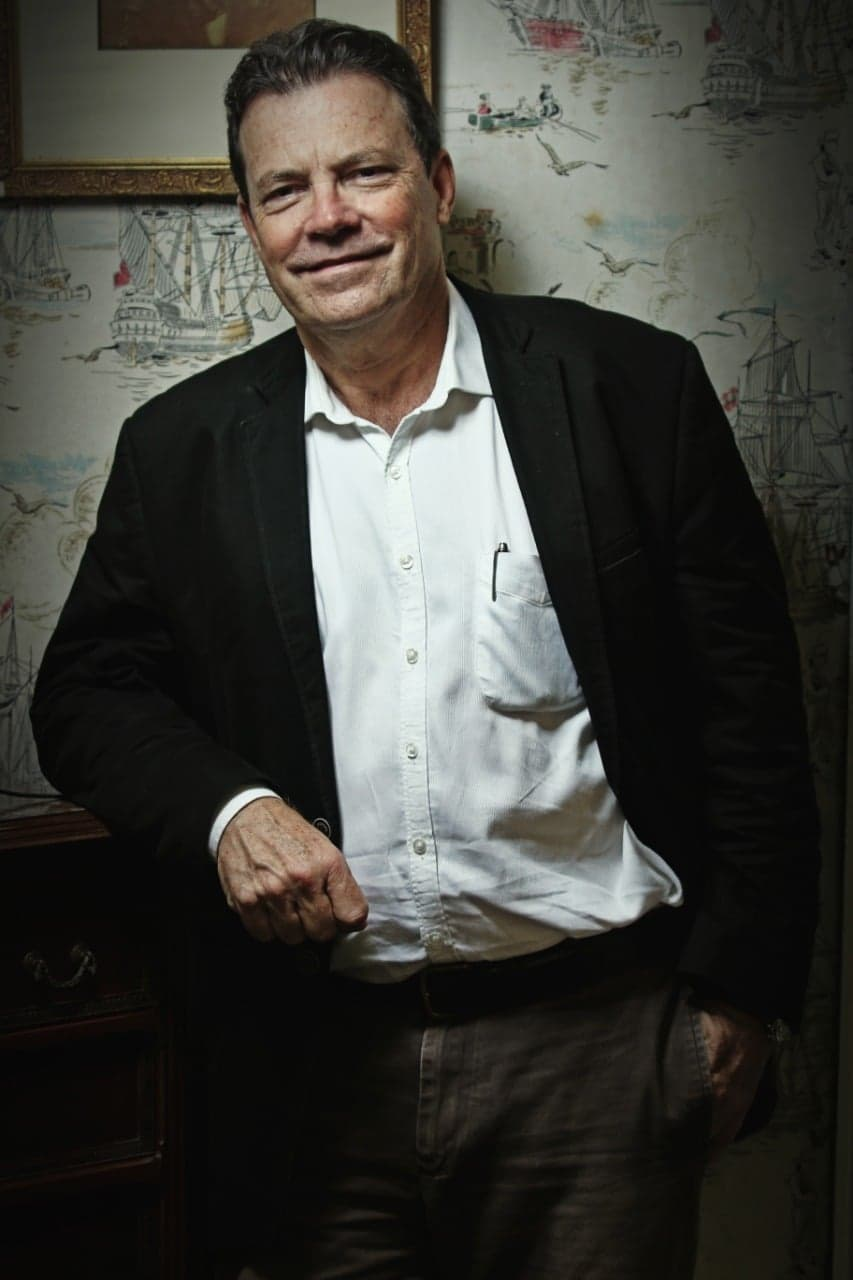

Chief Executive Officer CEO of St Aubin Ltd.
- In office 2008–2024

Member of National Assembly
- In office 2000–2005
- Prime Minister: Anerood Jugnauth, Paul Bérenger

Member of National Assembly
- In office 2005–2010
- Prime Minister: Navin Ramgoolam

Member of National Assembly
- In office 2010–2014
- Prime Minister: Navin Ramgoolam

Personal details
- Born: 23 October 1960 Curepipe, British Mauritius
- Died: 5 March 2024 (aged 63) Mauritius
- Party: Parti Travailliste; MMM; PMSD; MMSD
- Education: Louisiana State University

Éric Joseph Raoul Guimbeau, commonly known as Éric Guimbeau (23 October 1960 – 5 March 2024) was a Mauritian businessman and politician.

== Early life ==
Éric Guimbeau was born in a Franco-Mauritian family in Curepipe, British Mauritius. His ancestor, Gustave Guimbeau, was a mariner from France who settled in Mauritius in the 1800s. Éric's uncle Cyril Guimbeau, a member of the PMSD, was a member of the Legislative Assembly from 1976 to 1981, representing the dependency of Rodrigues.

== Political career ==
Éric Guimbeau's first attempt at local politics was as a candidate in the municipal elections in the 1990s. During the 1996 General Elections, he was a candidate of the Labour Party but was not elected, after which he distanced himself from that party.

At the 2000 General Elections he was a candidate of the MMM within the MSM-MMM coalition in Constituency No. 17. He was elected with the highest number of votes for that constituency. He formed part of the government led by Anerood Jugnauth and Paul Berenger. His father, Maxime Guimbeau, died on 19 March 2004 at Clinique Darné, prompting Eric Guimbeau to ask the Minister of Health Ashock Jugnauth to investigate the unexpected death and the clinic was prosecuted until February 2024.

Eric Guimbeau was elected at the July 2005 General Elections within the opposition MSM-MMM coalition, as the Labour-PMXD formed the new government–VF–MR–MMSM coalition. As he became dissatisfied with his position within the MMM, he contemplated joining the ailing PMSD. Still, the factional disputes within the PMSD motivated him to launch his party, the Mouvement Mauricien Social Démocrate (MMSD), in 2009, which he intended to be a fusion of the MMM and PMSD.

At the 2010 General Elections, his newly formed party, MMSD, allied with the MMM and UN, and Éric Guimbeau was elected in Constituency No. 17 with the highest number of votes in that constituency. Thus, Guimbeau formed part of the opposition, while his rivals of the Labour–PMSD–MSM coalition formed the government. However, at the 2014 and 2019 general elections, he did not form any coalition with other parties, and he was not elected.

== Business career ==
Éric Guimbeau's was the CEO of Saint Aubin Ltée, a family-owned enterprise which was originally involved in sugar production before expanding into tourism and rum making. After his death he was given the post humous title of Grand Officer of the Order of the Star and Key of the Indian Ocean (GOSK) for his contribution to the economic development of Mauritius. However, since 2016 Guimbeau's Saint Aubin Ltée has made news headlines after being placed under receivership for being insolvent, resulting in layoffs and court battles with the MCB.

- Mauritius:
  - Grand Officer of the Order of the Star and Key of the Indian Ocean (2024)

== Death ==
On 3 March 2024, Eric Guimbeau was riding his Harley Davidson motorcycle as part of a group of 8 motorbikes, travelling from Souillac and heading to Saint Aubin, when a car suddenly stopped in front of him along Royal Road, Union Ducray, forcing him to apply his brakes in an emergency. This caused Eric Guimbeau to lose control of the motorcycle, and he landed on the bitumen before an oncoming Sport Utility Vehicle (SUV) impacted his head. An ambulance of Service d’Aide Médicale d’Urgence (SAMU) was called, and Eric Guimbeau was rushed to Jawaharlall Nehru Hospital in Rose Belle. He was then transferred to the private clinic Welkin, where he died on 5 March 2024. On 8 March 2024, Eric Guimbeau was buried at Mahebourg Cemetery.

== Links ==
Éric Guimbeau's party MMSD videos
