= 1987 Mauritian general election =

| ← 1983 | 30 August 1987 | 1991 → |

All 62 directly elected seats in the Legislative Assembly (and up to 8 BLS seats)
- Turnout: 88.75% (▲3.56 pp)
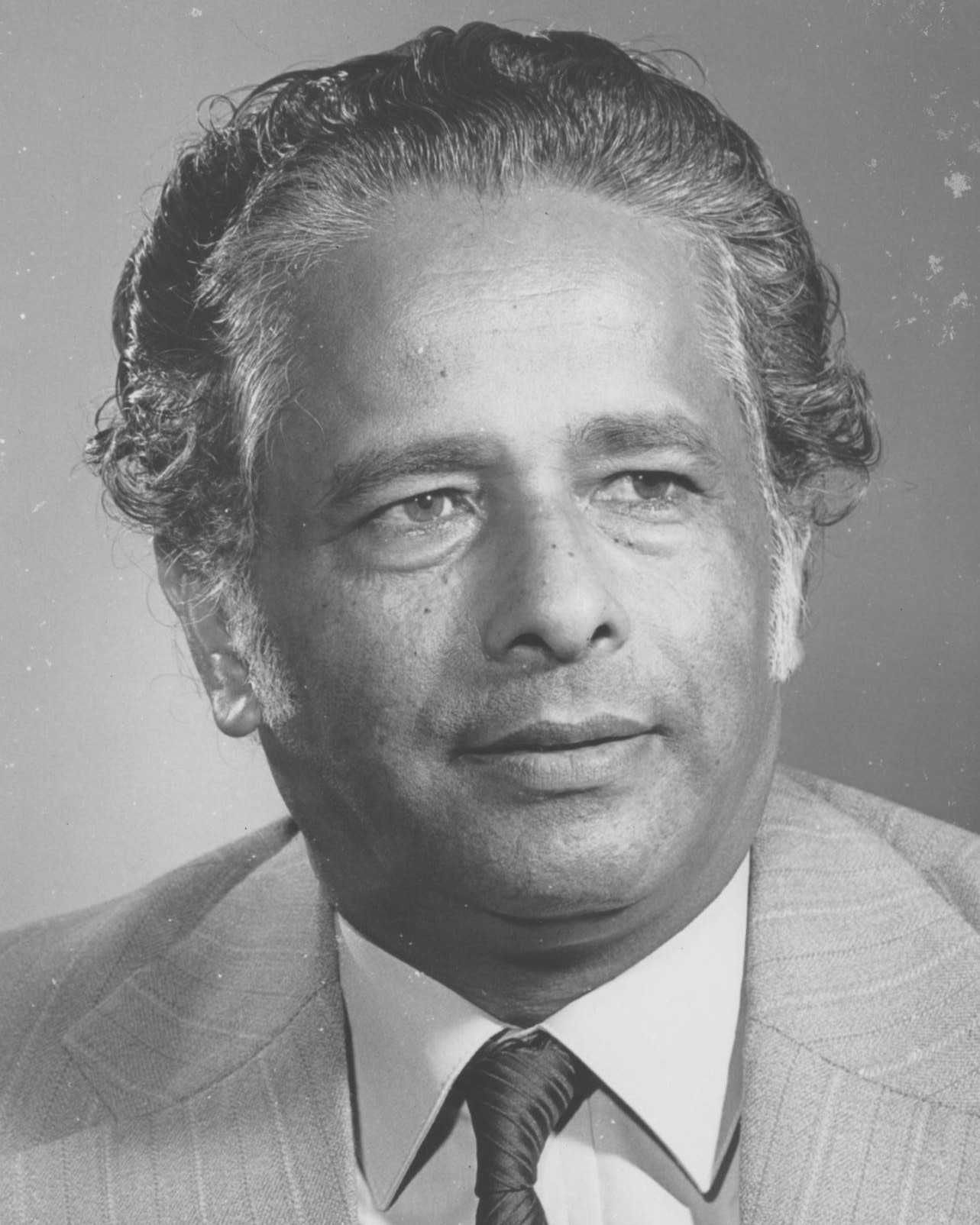

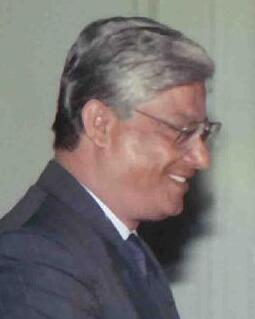
| | First party | Second party |
|---|---|---|
| Leader | Anerood Jugnauth | Prem Nababsing |
| Party | MSM | MMM |
| Alliance | Alliance | Union |
| Alliance seats | 44 | 24 |
| Popular vote | 817,635 | 789,268 |
| Alliance % | 49.00% | 47.30% |
- Result by constituency. The colour shade shows the percentage of the elected candidate with the highest number of votes
Prime Minister before election
Anerood Jugnauth
MSM
Subsequent Prime Minister
Anerood Jugnauth
MSM

General elections were held in Mauritius on 30 August 1987. The result was a victory for the Alliance, composed of the Labour Party, the Mauritian Socialist Movement and the Mauritian Social Democrat Party, which won 44 of the 70 seats.

The voting system involved twenty constituencies on Mauritius, which each elected three members. Two seats were elected by residents of Rodrigues, and up to eight seats were filled by the "best losers". Voter turnout was 85%.

== Results ==
All 24 seats won by the Union were taken by the MMM. Of the 40 seats won by the MSM–Labour Party alliance, 31 were won by the MSM (26 constituency, five best loser) and nine by the Labour Party (all constituency seats).

| Party | Votes | % | Seats | | | |
| Party | Votes | % | Cons | BL | Total | +/– |
|---|---|---|---|---|---|---|
| Union (MMM–DLM–SWF) | 789,268 | 47.30 | 21 | 3 | 24 | +2 |
| Alliance (MSM–Labour Party) | 675,757 | 40.50 | 35 | 5 | 40 | –1 |
| Mauritian Social Democrat Party | 141,878 | 8.50 | 4 | 0 | 4 | –1 |
| Rodrigues People's Organisation | 17,044 | 1.02 | 2 | 0 | 2 | 0 |
| Rodrigues People's Grouping | 11,826 | 0.71 | 0 | 0 | 0 | New |
| Lalit | 8,723 | 0.52 | 0 | 0 | 0 | 0 |
| Mauritian People's Party | 3,794 | 0.23 | 0 | 0 | 0 | 0 |
| MTS | 2,077 | 0.12 | 0 | 0 | 0 | New |
| OMT-FNAS | 1,529 | 0.09 | 0 | 0 | 0 | New |
| MEM/PE | 678 | 0.04 | 0 | 0 | 0 | New |
| Mauritian Future | 676 | 0.04 | 0 | 0 | 0 | New |
| National Mauritius Muslim Rights | 606 | 0.04 | 0 | 0 | 0 | New |
| Progressive Socialist Movement | 590 | 0.04 | 0 | 0 | 0 | New |
| Mauritian Planters Movement | 524 | 0.03 | 0 | 0 | 0 | New |
| Rally for the Economy and Development | 512 | 0.03 | 0 | 0 | 0 | New |
| Socialist Movement of the South | 459 | 0.03 | 0 | 0 | 0 | New |
| Mario Fabien Grouping | 362 | 0.02 | 0 | 0 | 0 | New |
| Tamil Fraternity of Mauritius | 240 | 0.01 | 0 | 0 | 0 | New |
| People's Democratic Movement | 117 | 0.01 | 0 | 0 | 0 | New |
| Mauritian National Party | 57 | 0.00 | 0 | 0 | 0 | New |
| Mauritius United Party | 54 | 0.00 | 0 | 0 | 0 | New |
| Mauritian Unity Organisation | 41 | 0.00 | 0 | 0 | 0 | New |
| Independents | 11,927 | 0.71 | 0 | 0 | 0 | 0 |
| Total | 1,668,739 | 100.00 | 62 | 8 | 70 | 0 |
| Valid votes | 561,058 | 98.87 | | | | |
| Invalid/blank votes | 6,423 | 1.13 | | | | |
| Total votes | 567,481 | 100.00 | | | | |
| Registered voters/turnout | 639,434 | 88.75 | | | | |
Source: Electoral Commission, Nohlen et al., African Elections Database
