= Militant Socialist Movement =

Political party in Mauritius

Militant Socialist Movement Mouvement Socialiste Militant Mouvman Sosialis Militan
- Abbreviation: MSM
- Leader: Pravind Jugnauth
- Secretary-General: Maneesh Gobin
- President: Joe Lesjongard
- Vice President: Leela Devi Dookun
- Founder: Anerood Jugnauth
- Founded: 8 April 1983
- Split from: Mauritian Militant Movement
- Headquarters: Sun Trust Building - 1er Etage, 31, rue Edith Cavell, Port-Louis
- Ideology: Social democracy
- Political position: Centre-left to left-wing
- National affiliation: Alliance Lepep
- Colours: Orange
- National Assembly: 1 / 66
- City and Town Councils: 0 / 120

Website
- www.msmparty.com

The Militant Socialist Movement (French: Mouvement Socialiste Militant; Morisyen: Mouvman Sosialis Militan, MSM) is a centre-left to left-wing political party in Mauritius. It was the single largest political party in the National Assembly of Mauritius, having won 42 of the 69 seats in the 2019 general elections; however, following the 2024 election, it only possesses one seat. It also holds the largest number of seats in all city/town councils through the country with 60 councillors out of 120. The party tends to be more popular amongst Indo-Mauritians.

The MSM is one of the 4 main political parties in the country; the others being the Labour Party or Parti Travailliste (PTr), Mouvement Militant Mauricien (MMM) and Parti Mauricien Social Démocrate (PMSD). The MSM is the only political party in the history of Mauritius to be formed when its office holders were in government, in sharp contrast to all other parties which were either founded in opposition or before acceding to power.

== Party history ==
The Militant Socialist Movement emerged in 1983 out of the split between the leaders of the two main parties comprising the coalition government: the MMM founder Paul Bérenger and the Parti Socialiste Mauricien (PSM) leader, Harish Boodhoo. Soon after the 1982 elections tensions and disagreement mounted within the MMM-PSM government. For example Paul Bérenger was white-anting PM Anerood Jugnauth in many ways, such as the unauthorised replacement of the national anthem Motherland by a Creole version on 12 March 1983, harassment by MMM thugs in Quatre Bornes, MMM's proposed constitutional amendment to transfer the Prime Minister's executive powers to the Cabinet as a collective body. Prime Minister Jugnauth, a member of the MMM, rejected Bérenger's proposal and was supported by PSM's Boodhoo. The MMM finally split, with Jugnauth and his supporters merging with Boodhoo's PSM to form the MSM. Thus despite Berenger's numerous attempts at undermining him, Jugnauth remained the Prime Minister and he started to prepare for imminent general elections and Boodhoo headed the MSM's first electoral campaign. Influential members of the MMMSP such as Dev Virahsawmy, as well as Peter Craig and Dan Callikan of the FTU also assisted the new MSM. Dev Virahsawmy designed the MSM's symbol of a golden sun on a white background. In the new party Jugnauth's principal allies were Kader Bhayat, Vishnu Lutchmeenaraidoo, Dineshwar Ramjuttun and Ajay Daby. The new MSM set up a politburo, appointed representatives of its regional sub-committees and on Friday 8 April 1983 officially launched the party at a large public rally held at La Caverne marketplace. Bérenger sought a parliamentary vote of no confidence to replace Jugnauth with Prem Nababsing, but Jugnauth abruptly dissolved the National Assembly before it had a chance to vote. On 18 June 1983 Jugnauth dissolved the Assembly. The MSM, in coalition with the Labour Party and the PMSD, went on to win the ensuing 1983 elections and Jugnauth remained in office. In December 1985, the MSM faced a new crisis as four of its members (Thomas, Nawoor, Kim Currun, and Pelladoah who all had earlier defected from the Labour Party) were arrested at Schiphol Airport, Amsterdam in the Netherlands after 20 kg of heroin were found in Pelladoah's suitcase. The MSM won the 1987 election with the same partners, and the 1991 election in a coalition with the MMM.

The coalition with the MMM turned out to be only a temporary rapprochement. In the leadup to the election expected to be held in 1996, the MMM left the government and formed an alliance with the Labour Party. Several MSM Members of Parliament also defected to the opposition, putting the Jugnauth administration under increasing strain. The elections ended up being brought forward to 1995. The opposition Labour-MMM coalition won all 60 seats, leaving the MSM without parliamentary representation. Navin Ramgoolam of the Labour Party became prime minister.

The Labour-MMM coalition subsequently broke up, and for the 2000 election, the MMM agreed to a pact with the MSM, providing that Jugnauth would serve as prime minister for three years. He would then resign and assume the presidency, handing the office of prime minister over to Paul Bérenger, the MMM leader. The MSM/MMM alliance won 54 of the 60 seats, and, as per the agreement, Jugnauth became prime minister and was succeeded by Bérenger in 2003. Bérenger led this coalition, which now included the PMSD, to defeat in the 2005 elections, however, and Ramgoolam became prime minister again. In 2010, the MSM joined the Labour-led Alliance de L'Avenir, which won the election, and Ramgoolam remained prime minister, with Pravind Jugnauth of the MSM as his Deputy. However, the party left the government in 2011 to join the opposition.

In 2014, The MSM opposed the Labor Party, which now aligned forces with the MMM instead. The MSM contested that year's election as part of the Alliance Lepep, which also included the PMSD and the Muvman Liberater; the alliance won 47 of the 60 directly elected mainland seats. Jugnauth, now 84, became prime minister again, even though his son Pravind Jugnauth was officially the party leader. In January 2017, Prime Minister Anerood Jugnauth stepped down to hand power to his son, Pravind. In November 2019, Mauritius’ ruling Militant Socialist Movement (MSM) won more than half of the seats in the 2019 elections, securing incumbent Prime Minister Pravind Kumar Jugnauth a new five-year term.

== Alliance LEPEP (2014–2016) ==
The MSM allied itself with two parties, the Parti Mauricien Social Démocrate (PMSD) and the Muvman Liberater (ML) which won another 18 seats, giving the MSM-led Alliance Lepep a clear majority of 51 seats in the 70-member parliament . It also hold 17 of the 25 positions in the Cabinet. The alliance was broken when the PMSD left the government.

== Alliance LEPEP (2024) ==
The MSM allied itself once again with the Parti Mauricien Social Démocrate (PMSD) and the Muvman Liberater (ML) where it has lost the 2024 general election with a score of 60-0 in favour of its adversary Alliance du changement led by the Labour Party. It also hold 1 seat in the 2024 National Assembly with Joe Lesjongard as the leader of the opposition. The alliance was broken a few days after the elections.

== Election results ==
=== Legislative elections ===
The MSM has won, either alone or as part of a coalition, six of the twelve general elections in Mauritius since independence (in 1983, 1987, 1991, 2000, 2014 and 2019). It draws most of its support from the country's Hindu majority.

Election	Leader	Coalition			Cand.	Seats	+/–	Position	Status
Election	Leader	Parties	Votes	%	Cand.	Seats	+/–	Position	Status
1983	Anerood Jugnauth	MSM–PTr–PMSD	575,996	41.10	35	32 / 70	New	▲1st	Coalition
1987	Anerood Jugnauth	MSM–PTr–PMSD	675,757	40.50	31	31 / 70	▼1	1st	Coalition
1991	Anerood Jugnauth	MSM–MMM–MTD	944,521	56.29	33	29 / 66	▼2	1st	Coalition
1995	Anerood Jugnauth	MSM–RMM	330,219	19.85	40	0 / 66	▼29	▼6th	No seats
2000	Anerood Jugnauth	MSM–MMM–PMSD–VF–MR	951,643	51.34	27	28 / 70	▲28	▲1st	Coalition
2005	Pravind Jugnauth	MSM–MMM–PMSD	831,738	42.41	29	14 / 70	▼14	▼2nd	Opposition
2010	Pravind Jugnauth	MSM–PTr–PMSD	1,001,903	49.69	18	13 / 69	▼1	▼3rd	Coalition (2010–2011)
2010	Pravind Jugnauth	MSM–PTr–PMSD	1,001,903	49.69	18	13 / 69	▼1	▼3rd	Opposition (2011–2014)
2014	Pravind Jugnauth	MSM–PMSD–ML	1,016,551	49.83	38	35 / 69	▲20	▲1st	Coalition
2019	Pravind Jugnauth	MSM–ML–MAG–PM	805,036	37.68	47	36 / 70	▲4	1st	Coalition
2024	Pravind Jugnauth	MSM–PMSD–MPM–ML–PM	639,372	27.29	40	1 / 66	▼36	▼7th	Opposition

== See also ==
- Category:Militant Socialist Movement politicians
