= Prem Nababsing =

Mauritian politician

Dr Prem Nababsing
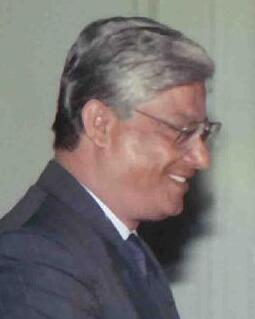

Deputy Prime Minister of Mauritius
- In office 25 February 1990 – 20 December 1995
- Monarch: Elizabeth II
- President: Cassam Uteem
- Governor General: Veerasamy Ringadoo
- Prime Minister: Aneerood Jugnauth
- Succeeded by: Paul Bérenger

Leader of the Opposition
- In office 15 September 1987 – 25 February 1990
- Prime Minister: Aneerood Jugnauth

Minister of Health
- In office 1991–1993
- Prime Minister: Aneerood Jugnauth

Ambassador of Mauritius in France
- In office 1982–1983
- Prime Minister: Aneerood Jugnauth

Personal details
- Born: Paramhamsa Nababsing; 24 November 1940 Camp Diable, British Mauritius
- Died: 21 October 2017 (aged 76) Quatre Bornes, Mauritius
- Party: Mauritian Militant Movement; Renouveau Militant Mauricien (RMM)
- Spouse: Vidula Seegobin-Nababsing
- Children: Nitisha, Aruna, Diya
- Education: University of Exeter, England
- Occupation: Industrial chemist

Paramhamsa Nababsing, more commonly known as Prem Nababsing (24 November 1940 – 21 October 2017), was a Mauritian politician and MMM minister.

== Early life ==
Nababsing was born in Camp Diable, in the Savanne district of Mauritius. His father was a primary school teacher. By 1960, he completed his secondary education at Royal College Curepipe and secured a scholarship which enabled him to travel to England to study chemistry at University of Exeter. He graduated with a PhD by 1968 and then returned to Mauritius.

Nababsing worked at Mauritius Chemical Fertilisers and Industries (MCFI) and the Mauritius Sugar Industry Research Institute (MSIRI).

== Political career ==
During the late 1960s and early 1970s Prem Nababsing and his wife, Vidula Seegobin-Nababsing, were actively involved in the newly formed MMM. At the 1976 general elections Vidula was elected to parliament in Constituency No.20. Following the victory of the MMM-PSM coalition at the 1982 elections Prem became Ambassador of Mauritius in France. At the 1983 elections Vidula was MMM candidate in Constituency No. 11 Vieux Grand Port Rose Belle but she was not elected.

Prem Nababsing also returned to Mauritius from France after these 1983 elections. In 1987 Prem Nababsing was elected for the first time to the National Legislative Assembly in Constituency No. 13 Riviere des Angullies Souillac. He held the position of Leader of the Opposition (Mauritius) from 1987 to 1991. At the 1991 elections, Prem was re-elected for a 5-year term to Parliament and was part of the ruling MSM-MMM coalition. He was Minister of Health until 1993, after which he became Deputy Prime Minister of Mauritius until 1995.

In 1994, Nababsing formed a new party called Renouveau Militant Mauricien (RMM). During the 1995 Mauritian general election, his party allied with the MSM suffered a huge defeat with no elected members in the parliament.
