= Mauritian Militant Movement =

Political party in Mauritius

Mauritian Militant Movement Mouvement Militant Mauricien Mouvman Militan Morisien
- Abbreviation: MMM
- Leader: Vacant
- Secretary-General: Rajesh Bhagwan
- Deputy Leader: Ajay Gunness
- Founders: Paul Bérenger, Dev Virahsawmy, etc.
- Founded: 4 September 1969
- Headquarters: Route Poudrière, Port Louis
- Newspaper: Le Militant
- Youth wing: Militant Youth
- Ideology: Democratic socialism
- Political position: Left-wing
- National affiliation: Alliance du Changement (since 2024)
- International affiliation: Progressive Alliance
- Colours: Purple
- National Assembly: 15 / 66

Election symbol

Party flag
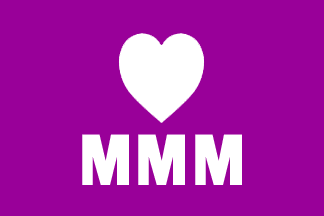

Website
- www.mmm.mu

The Mauritian Militant Movement (MMM; French: Mouvement Militant Mauricien; Morisyen: Mouvman Militan Morisien) is a left-wing democratic socialist political party in Mauritius. The party was founded by a group of students in the late 1960s. The MMM advocates a fairer society, without discrimination on the basis of social class, race, community, caste, religion, gender or sexual orientation.

In the general election of 2024, the MMM became the second largest party in the National Assembly of Mauritius with 19 Members of Parliament, following the departure of four party members, including former leader Paul Bérenger.

== Structure ==
The party is divided into twenty Regionales, one for each of the twenty National Assembly constituencies the main island is divided into. (A twenty-first constituency covers the island of Rodrigues; the MMM, like other mainland parties, typically does not contest elections there, although historically they had a Regionale organized there). The MMM is divided into branches, each of which has a minimum of ten members. Each branch sends two representatives to the local Regionale. Each Regionale has one representative on the party's Central Committee (CC). The CC also includes one male and one female representative of the party's Youth Wing. The CC elects a Political Bureau from among its own members. Ultimate power within the party consists of the Assembly of Delegates, consisting of members of all branches, which can make any decision with a simple majority by secret ballot.

=== Women's Wing ===
Since its inception in 1969, the MMM has emphasized women's rights, and claims to have been the first political party in the country to have done so. A Women's Wing was officially organized in 1974, with the goal of ensuring consistent representation of women in the Central Committee and the Political Bureau. It also seeks to support female candidates for parliamentary elections. Its fourteen-member executive committee is elected at the same time as the party's Central Committee. The party's constitution allocates at least two positions on the Central Committee to women who are not Members of Parliament.

=== Youth Wing ===
The Youth Wing, officially Jeunesse Militante, formed in 1973, is open to all Mauritian citizens aged between fifteen and thirty. A Youth Wing member can be affiliated to a branch or Regionale, or can join the Youth Wing directly. Membership is free of charge.

The Youth Wing is led by eleven executive members. They are chosen, normally for one year, by secret ballot of sixty representatives, three from each of the twenty Regionales.

== History ==
The MMM's origins date back to 1968 when students' movements Club des Étudiants Mauriciens and Quatre-Bornes Students Association were formed by Veenoo Mootien and Robin Punchoo respectively. These two groups merged into Club des Étudiants, which met regularly at Tennyson College, Quatre Bornes. In September 1969 during street protests against Princess Alexandra's visit, 12 of the student-activists (including Heeralall Bhugaloo, Paul Bérenger, and Sushil Khushiram) were arrested by local police. After their release from prison, and with the assistance of PMSD MP Hurry Parsad Sham (also known as Panchoo), the student movement established its first Executive Committee at Heeralall Bhugaloo's Port Louis High School. The committee's first elected members were Heeralall Bhugaloo, Dev Virahsawmy, Jooneed Jeeroobhurkhan, Tirat Ramkissoon, Sushil Khushiram, Ah Ken Wong, Robin Punchoo, and Paul Bérenger. Other notable members of the new party were Zeel Peerun, Fureed Muttur, Chafeekh Jeeroburkhan, Krishen Mati, Kriti Goburdhun, Allen Sew Kwan Kan, Vela Vengaroo, and Amédée Darga. The movement also modified its name to Mouvement Militant Mauricien in September 1969.

=== The early years ===
The MMM won its first parliamentary seat in a by-election in Constituency No. 5 Triolet-Pamplemousses in September 1970, following the death of IFB Attorney-General Lall Jugnauth. Dev Virahsawmy (MMM) defeated Nundlall, the candidate jointly proposed by the governing Labour Party, the Parti Mauricien Social Démocrate (PMSD), and a smaller party (CAM) by over 5000 votes. Showkutally Soodhun assisted Dev Virahsawmy and the MMM during the 1970 by-elections.

The MMM experienced its first schism in 1972, when the party's president Heeralall Bhugaloo left the party due to clashes over language and clothing preferences. Shortly afterwards Dev Virahsawmy left the party in 1973 to found the MMMSP.

=== The path to power: 1976–1982 ===
In 1976, in the first general election since independence, the MMM emerged as the largest single party, with 34 of the 70 National Assembly seats. The Labour Party, led by the incumbent Prime Minister, Sir Seewoosagur Ramgoolam, won 28 seats, and the PMSD, led by Sir Gaëtan Duval won 8. The MMM was only two seats short of a majority, but Ramgoolam remained in office by forming a coalition with the PMSD. The MMM formed a strong parliamentary opposition with Sir Anerood Jugnauth as Leader of the Opposition. Prior to the December 1976 elections Heeralall Bhugaloo defected from the MMM to join the Labour Party. For several years Heeralall Bhugaloo had been President of the MMM. Other members also followed his lead including Ramesh Fulena and Vijay Makhan.

The MMM won power in the municipalities of Port Louis, Beau Bassin/Rose Hill and Vacoas/Phoenix. The first MMM mayors were Kader Bhayat (Port Louis), Jean Claude de l'Estrac (Beau Bassin/Rose Hill) and D. Jhuboolall (Vacoas/Phoenix).

On 13 January 1977 Heeralall Bhugaloo resigned from his position of Minister of Education under the Labour-PMSD government which he had held since the December 1976 elections. This made way for Kher Jagatsingh who took on Bhugaloo's ministerial seat.

=== 1982 victory: first 60-0 sweep of directly elected seats ===
In the following election in 1982, the MMM campaigned on a theme of change. Using the slogan, Enn nouvo simen pou enn nouno lavie, the MMM won 42 of the directly elected seats in its own right, with a further 18 seats going to the PSM and 2 to the Rodrigues People's Organisation, both of which were electorally allied to the MMM. The MMM and its allies had thus made a unanimous sweep of the directly elected seats — an unprecedented feat. Jugnauth became Prime Minister, with Paul Bérenger as Minister of Finance.

=== The 1983 schism and aftermath ===
Disagreements within the MMM led to a schism on 22 March 1983, when Prime Minister Jugnauth rejected Bérenger's demands for the executive powers of the Prime Minister to be transferred to the Cabinet as a collective body. The party sought to replace Jugnauth with Prem Nababsing, but he dissolved Parliament before it had a chance to vote on the No Confidence motion brought by his erstwhile colleagues. Leaving the MMM, he and his remaining parliamentary supporters founded the Militant Socialist Movement (MSM). In the election that ensued, the Jugnauth's MSM and two allied parties held power, with the MMM, now led by Bérenger, winning only 19 of the 60 directly elected seats, despite gaining 46.4 percent of the popular vote. The MMM was to remain in opposition for the rest of the decade; despite winning 47.3 percent of the popular vote in the 1987 election, it secured only 21 of the 60 directly elected seats.

=== 1990s and 2000s: Alternating alliances in and out of power and second 60-0 sweep ===
Mauritian politics for the next three decades was characterized by frequently shifting political alliances involving the MMM, the MSM, the Labour Party, and some smaller parties. The MMM formed an alliance with the MSM for the 1990 elections, campaigning for Mauritius to cut its ties with the British monarchy and become a republic. The coalition subsequently broke down.

In the 1995 elections, the MMM joined forces with the Labour Party. This alliance swept all 60 directly elected seats, with 35 seats going to Labour and 25 to the MMM. The Labour Party leader, Navin Ramgoolam became Prime Minister with Bérenger as his Deputy. In 1997, however, Ramgoolam dismissed all MMM ministers, including Bérenger, and formed a one-party Cabinet.

In the 2000 elections, the MMM again formed an alliance with the MSM, under an agreement that each party would contest an equal number of parliamentary seats; if successful, they would divide the Cabinet posts equally, and that Jugnauth, the MSM leader, would serve as prime minister for three years, after which he would resign, assume the largely ceremonial Presidency, and hand the Prime Minister's office over to Bérenger. Accordingly, Bérenger succeeded Jugnauth as Prime Minister on 30 September 2003. He led the MMM/MSM alliance to defeat in the elections of 2005. The alliance subsequently broke up.

=== 2010s: Electoral decline ===
The MMM contested the May 2010 elections against the PTR as part of the Alliance du Coeur with two smaller parties — the Union National of Ashock Jugnauth and Social Democrat Mauritian Mouvement (MMSD) of Éric Guimbeau. The Alliance du Coeur won only 18 of the 60 directly elected seats, as well as two indirectly elected seats.

By 2014, the deputy leader of the party resigned when the MMM had formed a new alliance with the Labour Party. In the general election held on 10 December that year, this alliance won only 16 of the 69 directly and indirectly elected seats. Of these, 12 were won by the MMM itself. In 2015, the future of the party was questioned after several members resigned from the party. Amidst infighting, the MMM lost all seats during the 2015 municipal elections, which saw Alliance Lepep sweep all five councils. The MMM also failed to win any seats in its stronghold of Beau Bassin-Rose Hill.

After the 2019 general election, the MMM won only 9 seats with 20% of popular vote. This was lowest the MMM obtained at a general election and the party's forth consecutive defeat.

=== 2020s: Broad alliance gains third 60-0 sweep ===
Following the 2019 result, the next strategy for the MMM was to form a strong opposition which would compete for the next general elections. While the idea of an alliance PTR- MMM- PMSD was floating around, it was far from achieved.

After witnessing the poor performances of then leader of opposition; Arvind Boolell, the MMM and PMSD formed an informal alliance, together with the Reform Party and later was joined by Rassemblement Mauricien. The entente L'espoir was formed and Xavier Luc-Duval; leader of the PMSD was made leader of opposition.

The entente gained in momentum and credibility. The PTR joined to lead this entente to the next municipal election after months of discussions and negotiations. Later, the PMSD, the RM and the Reform Party left the entente and an alliance was finalised between the Ptr and the MMM. This alliance was called Alliance du Changement with the PTR and MMM as the main partners and the ND and ReA as the minor partners.

The formation of the Alliance du Changement was announced on 9 October 2024 in preparation for the November 2024 Mauritian general election by Richard Duval, Navin Ramgoolam and Paul Bérenger of the New Democrats (ND), Labour Party (PTr) and Mauritian Militant Movement (MMM) respectively, ahead of the official registration of the coalition which occurred on 11 October 2024. A fourth party, Rezistans ek Alternativ (REA) by Ashok Subron, later joined this coalition.

Alliance du Changement won a landslide victory in the November 2024 Mauritian general election. The MMM won all the 19 seats it was attributed and witnessed a third 60–0 victory, following the Mauritian General Election of 1982 and 1995. It was also the fifth time where the MMM was part of a majority Government.

The MMM obtained 8 ministries and 3 junior ministries:. As of 27 November 2024, third elected member of Constituency No.20 (Beau-Bassin/Petite-Riviere), was expelled from the MMM because of poor work ethics, following his disppointment of his non-nomination of as the Minister of Sports. Thus, leaving the MMM with 18 elected members.

1. Paul Bérenger (MMM) : Deputy Prime Minister

2. Arianne Navarre-Marie (MMM), Minister of Gender Equality

3. Jyoti Jeetun (MMM), Minister of Financial Services and Economic Planning

4. Deven Nagalingum (MMM) : Minister of Sports

5. Reza Uteem (MMM) : Minister of Labour and Industrial Relations

6. Aadil Ameer Meea (MMM) : Minister of Industry SMEs Cooperatives

7. Rajesh Bhagwan (MMM) : Minister of Environment

8. Ajay Gunness (MMM) : Minister of Infrastructure

9. Joanna Bérenger (MMM) : Junior Minister of Environment

10. Karen Foo Kune-Bacha (MMM) : Junior Minister of Sports

11. Fawzi Allymun (MMM) : Junior Minister of Local Government

=== 2025: Paul Berenger resigns ===
Since November 2025, the emblematic leader, Paul Berenger of the MMM, signaled his intention to leave the Government over major disagreements, corruption and for not respecting the electoral engagements proposed by the Alliance du Changement.

He resigned as Deputy Prime Minister of the Government on the 20 March 2026. Later, he was followed by Joanna Berenger, who resigned as Junior Minister, and Chetan Baboolall, who left the Government. The other 15 MMM elected Members of Parliament chose to stay in the Government.

On 13 April 2026, Paul Berenger together with Joanna Berenger and Chetan Baboolall sent their official letter of resignation to the MMM. Paul Berenger, a founding member of the MMM, leaves the party after more than 57 years.

=== Party leaders ===
Leader	Term start	Term end
Paul Bérenger	1983	August 1987
Prem Nababsing	August 1987	24 October 1994
Paul Bérenger	October 1994	25 January 2013
Alan Ganoo; Acting	25 January 2013	1 October 2013
Paul Bérenger	1 October 2013	13 April 2026

== Election results ==
=== Legislative elections ===
Election	Leader	Coalition			Cand.	Seats	+/–	Position	Status
Election	Leader	Parties	Votes	%	Cand.	Seats	+/–	Position	Status
1976	Anerood Jugnauth	—N/a	469,420	38.69	60	34 / 70	New	▲1st	Opposition
1982	Anerood Jugnauth	MMM–PSM	906,800	63.02	42	42 / 66	▲8	1st	Coalition (1982–1983)
1982	Anerood Jugnauth	MMM–PSM	906,800	63.02	42	42 / 66	▲8	1st	Opposition (1983)
1983	Paul Bérenger	—N/a	629,528	45.58	60	22 / 70	▼20	▼2nd	Opposition
1987	Prem Nababsing	MMM–MTD–FTS	789,268	47.30	45	24 / 70	▲2	2nd	Opposition (1987–1990)
1987	Prem Nababsing	MMM–MTD–FTS	789,268	47.30	45	24 / 70	▲2	2nd	Coalition (1990–1991)
1991	Prem Nababsing	MMM–MSM–MTD	944,521	56.29	25	25 / 66	▲1	2nd	Coalition (1991–1993)
1991	Prem Nababsing	MMM–MSM–MTD	944,521	56.29	25	25 / 66	▲1	2nd	Opposition (1993–1995)
1995	Paul Bérenger	MMM–PTr	1,084,236	65.17	25	25 / 66	Steady	2nd	Coalition (1995–1997)
1995	Paul Bérenger	MMM–PTr	1,084,236	65.17	25	25 / 66	Steady	2nd	Opposition (1997–2000)
2000	Paul Bérenger	MMM–MSM–PMSD–VF–MR	951,643	51.34	29	29 / 70	▲4	▲1st	Coalition
2005	Paul Bérenger	MMM–MSM–PMSD	831,738	42.41	30	11 / 70	▼18	▼3rd	Opposition
2010	Paul Bérenger	MMM–UN–MMSD	847,095	42.01	55	19 / 69	▲8	▲2nd	Opposition
2014	Paul Bérenger	MMM–PTr	785,645	38.51	30	12 / 69	▼7	2nd	Opposition
2019	Paul Bérenger	—N/a	439,402	20.57	60	9 / 70	▼3	▼3rd	Opposition
2024	Paul Bérenger	MMM–PTr–ND–ReA	1,438,333	61.38	19	19 / 66	▲10	▲2nd	Coalition

== Affiliations ==
The MMM was a member of the Socialist International, an international grouping of socialist, social-democratic, and labour parties, and is currently a member of the Progressive Alliance.
