= First Pravind Jugnauth cabinet =

Cabinet of Mauritius from 2017 to 2019

- 15th Cabinet of Mauritius

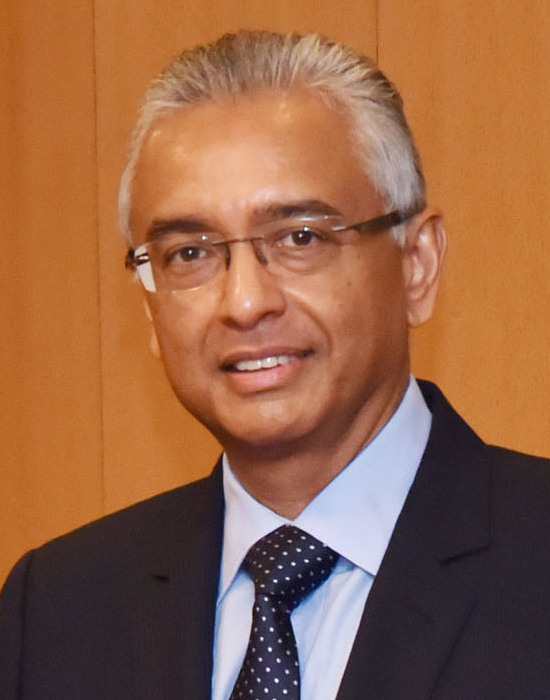
- Date formed: 23 January 2017
- Date dissolved: 12 November 2019

People and organisations
- President: Ameenah Gurib-Fakim; Barlen Vyapoory (acting)
- Prime Minister: Pravind Jugnauth
- Deputy Prime Minister: Ivan Collendavelloo
- Member party: MSM; ML; OPR
- Status in legislature: Majority coalition
- Opposition party: PMSD; MMM; PTr; MP
- Opposition leader: Xavier-Luc Duval

History
- Election: 2014
- Legislature term: 6th National Assembly
- Predecessor: A. Jugnauth VI
- Successor: P. Jugnauth II

The First Pravind Jugnauth cabinet was a former cabinet of Mauritius formed by prime minister Pravind Jugnauth on 23 January 2017, following the resignation of his father and predecessor, Sir Anerood Jugnauth, as prime minister.

The Alliance Lepep, which won the general election in 2014, had its composition and majority in the National Assembly reduced following the decision of one of the parties in the coalition, the Parti Mauricien Social Démocrate, to quit the government in late December 2016. A full cabinet reshuffle had been expected to take place by the end of January 2017 but instead, Sir Anerood Jugnauth announced his resignation unexpectedly and to allow his son Pravind to take his place and form a new government. After the formation of his government, the governing coalition was only left with the Militant Socialist Movement, Muvman Liberater and the Rodrigues People's Organisation forming the new cabinet.

The cabinet was dissolved on 12 November 2019 following the victory of Pravind's Alliance Morisien in the general election held that same month and the formation of his second government.

== History ==
=== Formation ===
After winning the general election held in 2014, Sir Anerood Jugnauth became prime minister of Mauritius for his sixth term in the office after his coalition Alliance Lepep won the election. The elder Jugnauth had announced his intention to resign the premiership on 21 January 2017 after addressing the nation through the state broadcaster Mauritius Broadcasting Corporation. He stated his decision to step down was to allow a "younger and more dynamic leader" to succeed him, naming his son Pravind Jugnauth in particular as having the confidence of the majority of all the members of the National Assembly.

Anerood Jugnauth submitted his resignation two days later on 23 January 2017, to the president, Ameenah Gurib-Fakim, at 09:15 in the morning. Not long after, Pravind Jugnauth met the president and received his letter of appointment as prime minister at 09:35. Afterwards, Pravind and his new set of ministers were sworn in at 15:00 in Sir Harilal Vaghjee Hall at Port Louis, instead of the tradition swearing-in ceremony held at the State House.

=== Changes from the previous cabinet ===
The elder Jugnauth was made Minister Mentor in the new cabinet, an entirely new position created specifically for him. The position was inspired by the Singaporean position of Minister Mentor, held by former Singaporean prime minister Lee Kuan Yew. He became third in terms of seniority in the cabinet. In addition, Anerood retained his portfolios of Defence and Rodrigues which is traditionally held by the prime minister. A motion was filed against the appointment of Anerood as Minister Mentor, Minister of Defence and Rodrigues by Sachidanand Reekhaye and Patrice Armance, an MP, in February 2017 citing that his resignation was tantamount to a resignation from the National Assembly as well and therefore he does not have the right to hold the portfolios. The Supreme Court dismissed the motion in January 2019 and declared the appointments and the creation of the office of Minister Mentor as constitutional.

Roshi Bhadain, who was the outgoing Minister of Financial Services, Good Governance and Institutional Reforms, was expected to be retained in the new cabinet and had been expected to attend the swearing-in ceremony on the same day. However, Bhadain issued a statement that he was not going to continue his role in the new government after discussions with the elder Jugnauth. The statement came as speculation drew on his absence during the ceremony. In the final list of ministers to be sworn in that day, the eleventh spot in the list was left empty and his portfolio was not included in the list. However, Pravind eventually appointed and elevated Sudhir Sesungkur to the ministry and became minister on the following day, 24 January.

The new cabinet saw three other new members elevated to a ministry. Stephan Toussaint was made Minister of Youth and Sports, replacing Yogida Sawmynaden who took the Ministry of Technology, Communication and Innovation from Étienne Sinatambou. Mahen Jhugroo took over the newly amalgamated two ministries of Local Government and Outer Islands, from Anwar Husnoo and Prem Koonjoo respectively. Eddy Boissézon from the Muvman Liberater was given the Ministry of Civil Service and Administrative Reforms, held by Ashit Gungah after the demission of the PMSD from the government. All three new ministers served as Parliamentary Private Secretaries in the elder Jugnauth's cabinet before being appointed.

In addition, Alain Wong, who was a PMSD MP and had quit his portfolios of Civil Service and Administrative Reforms and Environment, Sustainable Development, and Disaster and Beach Management after his party left the government, returned to the front benches after leaving his party and joining the MSM. He was appointed as Minister of Social Integration and Economic Empowerment in his second stint within the government.

== Supporting parties ==
Name		Leader	Ministers	Private Secretaries
Government parties
MSM	Militant Socialist Movement; Mouvement Socialiste Militant	Pravind Jugnauth	21 / 25	8 / 10
ML	Muvman Liberater	Ivan Collendavelloo	4 / 25	1 / 10
OPR	Rodrigues People's Organisation; Organisation du Peuple Rodriguais	Francisco François	0 / 25	1 / 10

== Ministers ==
Party key	Militant Socialist Movement
Party key	Muvman Liberater

Portfolio	Portrait	Minister	Term
Prime Minister
Prime Minister		Pravind Jugnauth	23 January 2017 – 12 November 2019
Deputy Prime Minister, Minister Mentor and Vice-Prime Minister
Deputy Prime Minister		Ivan Collendavelloo	23 January 2017 – 12 November 2019
Minister Mentor		Sir Anerood Jugnauth	23 January 2017 – 12 November 2019
Vice-Prime Minister		Showkutally Soodhun	23 January 2017 – 16 November 2017
Vice-Prime Minister		Fazila Jeewa-Daureeawoo	16 November 2017 – 12 November 2019
Ministers
Minister of Home Affairs, External Communications and National Development Unit		Pravind Jugnauth	23 January 2017 – 12 November 2019
Minister of Finance and Economic Development		Pravind Jugnauth	23 January 2017 – 12 November 2019
Minister of Energy and Public Utilities		Ivan Collendavelloo	23 January 2017 – 12 November 2019
Minister of Defence		Sir Anerood Jugnauth	23 January 2017 – 12 November 2019
Minister for Rodrigues		Sir Anerood Jugnauth	23 January 2017 – 12 November 2019
Minister of Housing and Lands		Showkutally Soodhun	23 January 2017 – 11 November 2017
Minister of Housing and Lands		Mahen Seeruttun	11 November 2017 – 16 November 2017
Minister of Housing and Lands		Mahen Jhugroo	16 November 2017 – 12 November 2019
Minister of Foreign Affairs, Regional Integration and International Trade		Vishnu Lutchmeenaraidoo	23 January 2017 – 21 March 2019
Minister of Foreign Affairs, Regional Integration and International Trade		Nando Bodha	22 March 2019 – 12 November 2019
Minister of Technology, Communication and Innovation		Yogida Sawmynaden	23 January 2017 – 12 November 2019
Minister of Public Infrastructure and Land Transport		Nando Bodha	23 January 2017 – 12 November 2019
Minister of Education and Human Resources, Tertiary Education and Scientific Research		Leela Dookun-Luchoomun	23 January 2017 – 12 November 2019
Minister of Tourism		Anil Gayan	23 January 2017 – 12 November 2019
Minister of Health and Quality of Life		Anwar Husnoo	23 January 2017 – 12 November 2019
Minister of Arts and Culture		Prithvirajsing Roopun	23 January 2017 – 12 November 2019
Minister of Social Security, National Solidarity, and Environment and Sustainable Development		Étienne Sinatambou	23 January 2017 – 12 November 2019
Minister of Agro-Industry and Food Security		Mahen Seeruttun	23 January 2017 – 12 November 2019
Minister of Industry, Commerce and Consumer Protection		Ashit Gungah	23 January 2017 – 12 November 2019
Attorney-General		Ravi Yerrigadoo	23 January 2017 – 13 September 2017
Attorney-General		Maneesh Gobin	14 September 2017 – 12 November 2019
Minister of Justice, Human Rights and Institutional Reforms		Maneesh Gobin	14 September 2017 – 12 November 2019
Minister of Youth and Sports		Stephan Toussaint	23 January 2017 – 12 November 2019
Minister of Business, Enterprise and Cooperatives		Sunil Bholah	23 January 2017 – 12 November 2019
Minister of Social Integration and Economic Empowerment		Alain Wong	23 January 2017 – 12 November 2019
Minister of Gender Equality, Child Development and Family Welfare		Fazila Jeewa-Daureeawoo	23 January 2017 – 16 November 2017
Minister of Gender Equality, Child Development and Family Welfare		Roubina Jadoo-Jaunbocus	16 November 2017 – 27 July 2018
Minister of Gender Equality, Child Development and Family Welfare		Fazila Jeewa-Daureeawoo	27 July 2018 – 12 November 2019
Minister of Ocean Economy, Marine Resources, Fisheries and Shipping		Prem Koonjoo	23 January 2017 – 12 November 2019
Minister of Labour, Industrial Relations, Employment and Training		Soodesh Callichurn	23 January 2017 – 12 November 2019
Minister of Local Government and Outer Islands		Mahen Jhugroo	23 January 2017 – 16 November 2017
Minister of Local Government and Outer Islands		Fazila Jeewa-Daureeawoo	16 November 2017 – 12 November 2019
Minister of Civil Service and Administrative Reforms		Eddy Boissézon	23 January 2017 – 12 November 2019
Minister of Financial Services, Good Governance and Institutional Reforms		Sudhir Sesungkur	23 January 2017 – 14 September 2017
Minister of Financial Services and Good Governance		Sudhir Sesungkur	14 September 2017 – 12 November 2019

=== Changes ===
- 13 September 2017 – Ravi Yerrigadoo resigned as Attorney-General and from the National Assembly following his involvement in a money laundering case. Maneesh Gobin was appointed as his replacement for the office with the additional portfolio of Minister of Justice, Human Rights and Institutional Reforms. Sudhir Sesungkur's portfolio title was modified to Financial Services and Good Governance following the transfer of responsibilities for Institutional Reforms to Gobin.
- 11 November 2017 – Showkutally Soodhun resigned as Minister of Housing and Lands after video and audio tapes surfaced of him making communal remarks. Mahen Seeruttun became his replacement, thus giving Serruttun two concurrent ministerial portfolios.
- 16 November 2017 – Cabinet reshuffle:
  - Fazila Jeewa-Daureeawoo became Vice-Prine Minister, replacing Soodhun
  - Mahen Jhugroo became Minister of Housing and Lands, replacing Mahen Seeruttun
  - Roubina Jadoo-Jaunbocus took over Jeewa-Daureeawoo's portfolio and became Minister of Gender Equality, Child Development and Family Welfare
  - Jeewa-Daureeawoo took over Jhugroo's portfolio and became Minister of Local Government and Outer Islands
- 27 July 2018 – Roubina Jadoo-Jaunbocus resigned as Minister of Gender Equality, Child Development and Family Welfare following. Her predecessor, Fazila Jeewa-Daureeawoo, took over the portfolio, thus giving her two concurrent ministerial portfolios.
- 22 March 2019 – Vishnu Lutchmeenaraidoo resigned as Minister of Foreign Affairs, Regional Integration and International Trade and from the National Assembly. Nando Bodha replaced Lutchmeenaraidoo in the portfolio.

== Parliamentary Private Secretaries ==
Due the departure of the Parti Mauricien Social Démocrate from the government, its two Parliamentary Private Secretaries (PPS), Salim Abbas Mamode and Thierry Henry, resigned from their positions on 19 December 2016. Two other Parliamentary Private Secretaries, one each from the Militant Socialist Movement and Muvman Liberater, were appointed as ministers, namely: Stephan Toussaint and Eddy Boissézon.

Four new Parliamentary Private Secretaries were appointed on 23 January 2017 to replace those who resigned. Marie-Claire Monty, who was elected as a PMSD MP and resigned from the party on 13 January 2017 and defected to the MSM, was made PPS. Kalyan Tarolah, Bobby Hurreeram and Alain Aliphon, all MPs from the MSM, were also appointed as PPS.

Party key	Militant Socialist Movement
Party key	Muvman Liberater
Party key	Rodrigues People's Organisation

Portrait	Private Secretary	Term
1	Sharvanand Ramkaun	24 January 2017 – 6 October 2019
2	Roubina Jadoo-Jaunbocus	24 January 2017 – 15 November 2017
2	Vikash Oree	15 November 2017 – 6 October 2019
3	Raj Rampertab	24 January 2017 – 6 October 2019
4	Sandhya Boygah	24 January 2017 – 6 October 2019
5	Tulsiraj Benydin	24 January 2017 – 6 October 2019
6	Francisco François	24 January 2017 – 6 October 2019
7	Marie-Claire Monty	24 January 2017 – 6 October 2019
8	Bobby Hurreeram	24 January 2017 – 22 October 2017
9	Kalyan Tarolah	24 January 2017 – 23 October 2017
9	Raffick Sorefan	31 October 2017 – 6 October 2019
10	Alain Aliphon	24 January 2017 – 6 October 2019

=== Changes ===
- 15 November 2017 – Roubina Jadoo-Jaunbocus resigned, following her appointed as Minister of Gender Equality, Child Development and Family Welfare, and was replaced by Vikash Oree.
- October 2017 – Bobby Hurreeram resigned on 22 October due to his appointment as Government Chief Whip. On the following day, 23 October, Kalyan Tarolah announced his resignation following a sexting scandal. Raffick Sorefan, who defected from the MMM to MPM and then to the MSM, was appointed as Tarolah's replacement on 31 October.
