= Alliance Lepep =

Political coalition in Mauritius

Alliance of the People Alliance Lepep Alliance du peuple
- Abbreviation: AL / Lepep
- Leader: Pravind Jugnauth
- Founders: Anerood Jugnauth; Xavier-Luc Duval; Ivan Collendavelloo
- Founded: 2014
- Ideology: Social democracy Liberal conservatism Democratic socialism
- Political position: Big tent
- Coalition members: Militant Socialist Movement; Parti Mauricien Social Démocrate; Muvman Patriot Morisien; Muvman Liberater; Plateforme Militante
- Colours: Orange; Blue
- Slogan: Pli For Ansam ('Stronger Together')
- National Assembly: 2 / 66

Website
- alliancelepep.com

Alliance Lepep (English: Alliance of the People; French: Alliance du peuple) is a coalition of parties in the island state of Mauritius.

== Participating parties ==
Party		2014	2019	2024
Party		Alliance Lepep	Alliance Morisien	Alliance Lepep
MSM	Militant Socialist Movement	Yes	Yes	Yes
PMSD	Parti Mauricien Social Démocrate	Yes	No	Yes
ML	Muvman Liberater	Yes	Yes	Yes
PM	Plateforme Militante	No	Yes	Yes
MAG	Mouvement Alan Ganoo	No	Yes	No
MPM	Muvman Patriot Morisien	No	No	Yes

== History ==
The Alliance Lepep was formed in 2014 by former president and prime minister of Mauritius, Sir Anerood Jugnauth in preparation for the 2014 Mauritian general election, which was held on 10 December 2014.

The main political parties which formed part of the coalition were:

- Militant Socialist Movement (MSM) - 40 candidates - led by Anerood Jugnauth
- Parti Mauricien Social Démocrate (PMSD) - 13 candidates - led by Xavier-Luc Duval
- Muvman Liberater (ML) - 7 candidates - led by Ivan Collendavelloo

During the electoral campaign Alliance Lepep nominated scientist Ameenah Gurib-Fakim as the proposed President of Mauritius.

== 2014 general elections ==
A popular slogan of this coalition was Viré Mam, meaning "Friend, it's time to change sides". The alliance won 47 of the 62 elected seats in the National Assembly, allowing it to form government. The Militant Socialist Movement elected 33 candidates whilst the Parti Mauricien Social Démocrate and Muvman Liberater each elected seven candidates. Out of the seven allocated best loser seats, all four allocated to the alliance was taken by the PMSD, bringing the party's total to eleven seats.

=== Candidates ===
Candidate names highlighted in green indicate elected candidates, yellow indicates that the candidate was elected via the best loser provisions and red unsuccessful candidates neither elected nor chosen for the best loser seats.

Constituency		Candidate 1		Candidate 2		Candidate 3	
1	GRNO–Port-Louis Ouest	Patrice Armance	PMSD	Alain Wong	PMSD	Danielle Selvon	MSM
2	Port-Louis Sud–Port-Louis Centre	Roubina Jadoo	MSM	Mahmad Kodabaccus	PMSD	Anwar Abbasakoor	ML
3	Port-Louis Maritime–Port-Louis Est	Raouf Gulbul	MSM	Salim Abbas Mamode	PMSD	Anwar Husnoo	ML
4	Port-Louis Nord–Montagne Longue	Aurore Perraud	PMSD	Vikash Oree	MSM	Marie Claire Monty	PMSD
5	Pamplemousses–Triolet	Soodesh Callichurn	MSM	Sarvanand Ramkaun	MSM	Sanjeev Teeluckdharry	MSM
6	Grand Baie–Poudre d'Or	Ashit Gungah	MSM	Sudesh Rughoobur	MSM	Sangeet Fowdar	ML
7	Piton–Rivière du Rempart	Anerood Jugnauth	MSM	Vishnu Lutchmeenaraidoo	MSM	Ravi Rutnah	ML
8	Quartier Militaire–Moka	Pravind Jugnauth	MSM	Leela Dookun	MSM	Yogida Sawmynaden	MSM
9	Flacq–Bon Accueil	Pradeep Roopun	MSM	Raj Dayal	MSM	Raj Rampertab	MSM
10	Montagne Blanche–GRSE	Sudhir Sesungkur	MSM	Kalyan Tarolah	MSM	Sunil Bholah	MSM
11	Vieux Grand Port–Rose Belle	Mahen Seeruttun	MSM	Prem Koonjoo	MSM	Sandhya Boygah	MSM
12	Mahébourg–Plaine Magnien	Thierry Henry	PMSD	Mahen Jhugroo	MSM	Bobby Hurreeram	MSM
13	Rivière des Anguilles–Souillac	Maneesh Gobin	MSM	Menon Murday	MSM	Bashir Jahangeer	MSM
14	Savanne–Rivière Noire	Maya Hanoomanjee	MSM	Dinesh Babajee	MSM	Mario Gangy	PMSD
15	La Caverne–Phœnix	Showkutally Soodhun	MSM	Tulsiraj Benydin	ML	Eddy Boissézon	ML
16	Vacoas–Floréal	Nando Bodha	MSM	Étienne Sinatambou	MSM	Baboo Sanataram	PMSD
17	Curepipe–Midlands	Adrien Duval	PMSD	Stephan Toussaint	MSM	Malini Sewocksingh	PMSD
18	Belle Rose–Quatre Bornes	Xavier-Luc Duval	PMSD	Roshi Bhadain	MSM	Koomaren Chetty	MSM
19	Stanley–Rose Hill	Ivan Collendavelloo	ML	Ramalingum Maistry	PMSD	Fazila Daureeawoo	MSM
20	Beau Bassin–Petite Rivière	Anil Gayan	ML	Guito Lepoigneur	PMSD	Alain Aliphon	MSM

== 2019 general elections ==
This coalition adopted the name Alliance Morisien and was made up of MSM and ML at the November 2019 general elections. The 60 candidates were:

=== Candidates ===
Candidate names highlighted in green indicate elected candidates, yellow indicates that the candidate was elected via the best loser provisions and red unsuccessful candidates neither elected nor chosen for the best loser seats.

Constituency		Candidate 1		Candidate 2		Candidate 3	
1	GRNO–Port-Louis Ouest	Nilen Vencadasmy	MSM	Dorine Chukowry	MSM	Clive Auffray	MSM
2	Port-Louis Sud–Port-Louis Centre	Abdullah Hossen	ML	Shakila Jahangeer	MSM	Zouberr Joomaye	MSM
3	Port-Louis Maritime–Port-Louis Est	Mahmad Bocus	MSM	Anwar Husnoo	MSM	Parvez Nurwoollah	ML
4	Port-Louis Nord–Montagne Longue	Joe Lesjongard	MSM	RJ Subhasnee	MSM	Joanne Tour	MSM
5	Pamplemousses–Triolet	Soodesh Callichurn	MSM	Jairajsing Luchoo	MSM	Sarvanand Ramkaun	MSM
6	Grand Baie–Poudre d'Or	Ashit Gungah	MSM	Sanjiv Ramdanee	MSM	Avinash Teeluck	MSM
7	Piton–Rivière du Rempart	Rajanah Dhaliah	MSM	Maneesh Gobin	MSM	Kalpana Koonjoo	MSM
8	Quartier Militaire–Moka	Pravind Jugnauth	MSM	Leela Dookun	MSM	Yogida Sawmynaden	MSM
9	Flacq–Bon Accueil	Deepak Balgobin	MSM	Sudheer Maudhoo	MSM	Vikash Nuckcheddy	MSM
10	Montagne Blanche–GRSE	Sunil Bholah	MSM	Vikram Hurdoyal	MSM	Zahid Nazurally	ML
11	Vieux Grand Port–Rose Belle	Teenah Jutton	MSM	Navina Ramyead	MSM	Mahen Seeruttun	MSM
12	Mahébourg–Plaine Magnien	Kavi Doolub	MSM	Bobby Hurreeram	MSM	Stephan Toussaint	MSM
13	Rivière des Anguilles–Souillac	Kailesh Jagutpal	MSM	Renganaden Padayachy	MSM	Ismaël Rawoo	ML
14	Savanne–Rivière Noire	Alan Ganoo	MAG	Sandra Mayotte	MSM	Prakash Ramchurrun	MSM
15	La Caverne–Phœnix	Gilbert Bablee	MSM	Mahmadally Burkutoola	MSM	Mahen Jhugroo	MSM
16	Vacoas–Floréal	Nando Bodha	MSM	Françoise Labelle	PM	Ashley Ittoo	MSM
17	Curepipe–Midlands	Steven Obeegadoo	PM	Kenny Dhunoo	MSM	Eddy Boissézon	ML
18	Belle Rose–Quatre Bornes	Vikash Peerun	MSM	Kavy Ramano	MSM	Tania Diolle	MAG
19	Stanley–Rose Hill	Ivan Collendavelloo	ML	Fazila Daureeawoo	MSM	Seety Naidoo	ML
20	Beau Bassin–Petite Rivière	Tulsiraj Benydin	ML	Ken Fong	ML	Gilles l’Entêté	MSM

== 2024 general election ==
The alliance was reformed once again under the name Alliance Lepep and the presentation of the candidates were revealed on 16 October 2016. A total of 60 candidates were fielded in the election, with 10 female candidates in total. Each party under the alliance were allocated seats: the MSM with 40 candidates, PMSD with 10 candidates, Muvman Liberater with four candidates, Muvman Patriot Morisien with three candidates and Plateforme Militante with two candidates.

In the aftermath of the election, the alliance lost the 42 seats (38 elected and 4 Best Losers) which it held from the 2019 general election, and only secured 2 nominated Best Loser seats in the National assembly. Joe Lesjongard from the Militant Socialist Movement, who eventually became Leader of the Opposition, and Adrien Duval from the PMSD were elected as best losers.

=== Candidates ===
Candidate names highlighted in green indicate elected candidates, yellow indicates that the candidate was elected via the best loser provisions and red unsuccessful candidates neither elected nor chosen for the best loser seats.

Constituency		Candidate 1		Candidate 2		Candidate 3	
1	GRNO–Port-Louis Ouest	Dorine Chukowry	MSM	Joanne Tour	MSM	Patrice Armance	PMSD
2	Port-Louis Sud–Port-Louis Centre	Roubina Jadoo	MSM	Abdallah Goolamallee	PM	Zia Nujuraully	PMSD
3	Port-Louis Maritime–Port-Louis Est	Salim Abbas Mamode	MSM	Mahmad Kodabaccus	PMSD	Abdoullah Etwarooah	ML
4	Port-Louis Nord–Montagne Longue	Adrien Duval	PMSD	Joe Lesjongard	MSM	RJ Subhasnee	MSM
5	Pamplemousses–Triolet	Soodesh Callichurn	MSM	Ravi Rutnah	MSM	Sunil Bholah	MSM
6	Grand Baie–Poudre d'Or	Neeshal Jugnauth	MSM	Avinash Teeluck	MSM	Sanjay Mooroteea	MSM
7	Piton–Rivière du Rempart	Leela Dookun	MSM	Ravi Yerrigadoo	MSM	Mahen Jhugroo	MSM
8	Quartier Militaire–Moka	Pravind Jugnauth	MSM	Deepak Balgobin	MSM	Lovin Lutchmanen	MSM
9	Flacq–Bon Accueil	Sudheer Maudhoo	MSM	Anand Ramchurn	MSM	Rubesh Doomun	MSM
10	Montagne Blanche–GRSE	Vikram Hurdoyal	MSM	Sameer Chitbahal	MSM	Vikesh Sohodeb	MSM
11	Vieux Grand Port–Rose Belle	Kalpana Koonjoo-Shah	MSM	Mahen Seeruttun	MSM	Randhir Mannick	MSM
12	Mahébourg–Plaine Magnien	Bobby Hurreeram	MSM	Kavi Doolub	MSM	Aurore Perraud	PMSD
13	Rivière des Anguilles–Souillac	Kailesh Jagutpal	MSM	Renganaden Padayachy	MSM	Parwez Nurwoollah	ML
14	Savanne–Rivière Noire	Alan Ganoo	MPM	Tania Diolle	MPM	Prakash Ramchurrun	MSM
15	La Caverne–Phœnix	Tulsiraj Benydin	ML	Gilbert Bablee	MSM	Yasin Hamuth	MPM
16	Vacoas–Floréal	Alexandre Leblanc	PMSD	Asant Govind	MSM	Deenoo Parveshsingh	MSM
17	Curepipe–Midlands	Steven Obeegadoo	PM	Malini Sewocksingh	PMSD	Sandra Mayotte	MSM
18	Belle Rose–Quatre Bornes	Xavier-Luc Duval	PMSD	Kavy Ramano	MSM	Sham Khemloliva	MSM
19	Stanley–Rose Hill	Ivan Collendavelloo	ML	Fazila Jeewa-Daureeawoo	MSM	Seety Naidoo	ML
20	Beau Bassin–Petite Rivière	Guito Lepoigneur	PMSD	Maheshwarsing Chackhoor	MSM	Miven Tirvengadum	PMSD

== Election results ==
=== Legislative elections ===
Election	Leader	Votes	%	Seats	+/–	Position	Status
2014	Anerood Jugnauth	1,016,551	49.83	51 / 69	▲34	▲1st	Coalition
2019	Pravind Jugnauth	805,036	37.68	42 / 70	▼9	1st	Coalition
2024	Pravind Jugnauth	639,372	27.29	2 / 66	▼40	▼2nd	Opposition
