= 2019 Mauritian general election =

- 7 November 2019

All 62 directly elected seats in the National Assembly (and up to 8 BLS seats)
- Turnout: 77.01% (▲2.90 pp)
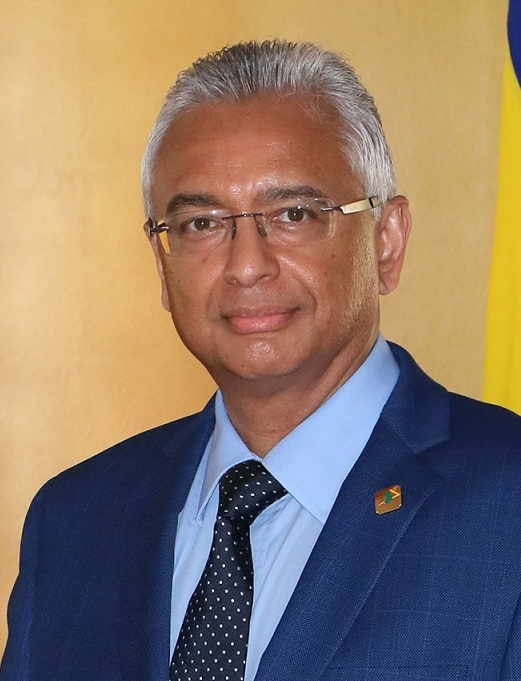

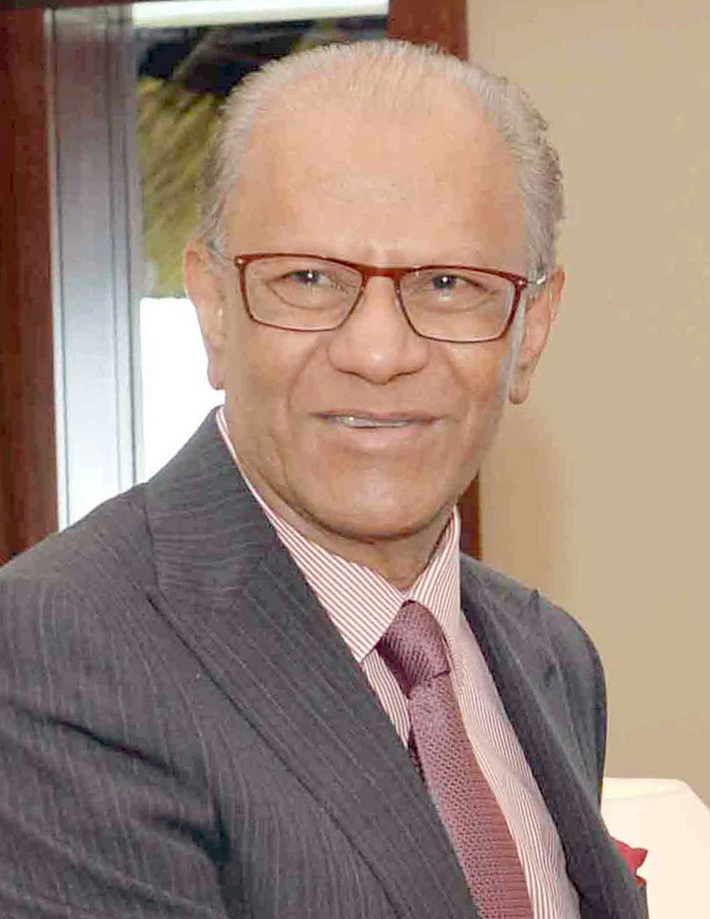

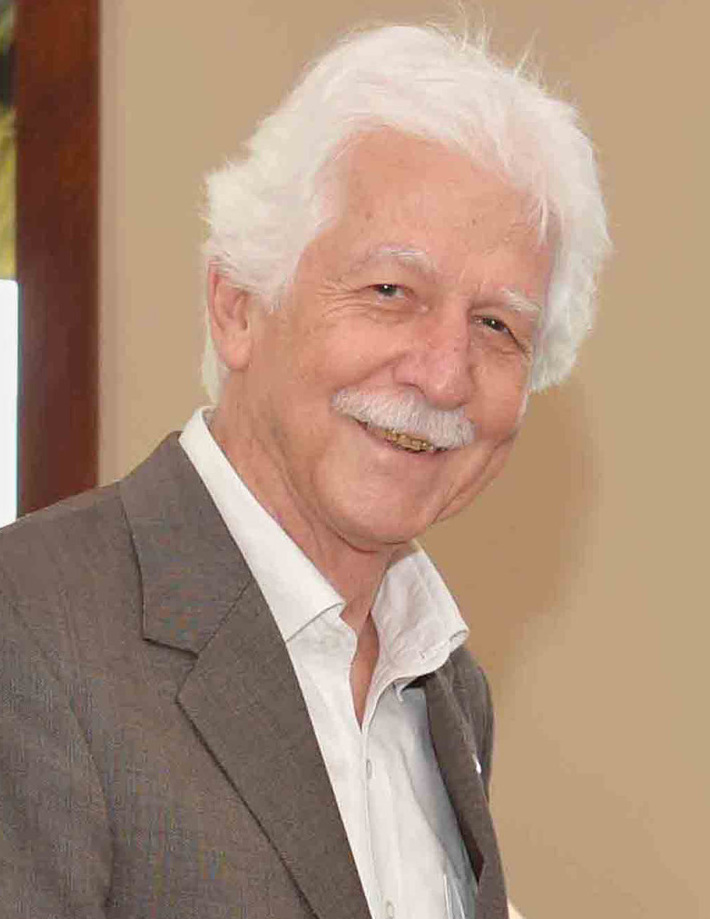
| | First party | Second party | Third party |
|---|---|---|---|
| Leader | Pravind Jugnauth | Navin Ramgoolam | Paul Bérenger |
| Party | MSM | Labour | MMM |
| Alliance | Alliance Morisien | Alliance Nationale | – |
| Seats won | 36 | 12 | 9 |
| Seat change | ▲3 | ▲8 | ▼3 |
| Popular vote | 684,459 | 555,864 | 439,402 |
| Percentage | 32.04% | 26.02% | 20.57% |
| Alliance seats | 42 | 17 |
| Popular vote | 805,036 | 710,782 |
| Alliance % | 37.68% | 33.27% |
- Alliance results by constituency. The colour shade shows the percentage of the elected candidate with the highest number of votes
Prime Minister before election
Pravind Jugnauth
MSM
Subsequent Prime Minister
Pravind Jugnauth
MSM

General elections were held in Mauritius on 7 November 2019. The governing Alliance Morisien, which changed its name from Alliance Lepep before the election, came to power in 2014 after defeating the Labour Party-led government in an upset. Pravind Jugnauth became prime minister in 2017, succeeding his father, Anerood Jugnauth. The opposition denounced the transition, claiming it was nepotism.

The Alliance Morisien bloc comprised Prime Minister Jugnauth's Militant Socialist Movement (MSM), Muvman Liberater (ML), Mouvement Alan Ganoo (MAG) and Plateforme Militante. The main opposition bloc, Alliance Nationale, was led by former Prime Minister Navin Ramgoolam. The alliance was made up of Ramgoolam's Labour Party, Parti Mauricien Social Démocrate (PMSD) and Mouvement Jean Claude Barbier (MJCB). Former Prime Minister Paul Bérenger's Mauritian Militant Movement (MMM), which formed a coalition with the Labour Party in 2014, declined to enter an alliance this election. Alliance Morisien campaigned on its governing record, while Alliance Nationale promised a reform of the system of government. Both coalitions and the MMM had similar economic policies.

A total of 941,719 individuals were enrolled to vote in this election. Votes were counted on 8 November, with voter turnout at 77%, up from 74% in 2014. Alliance Morisien secured re-election, winning 42 seats. Although the bloc won a majority of seats, it received just 37% of the vote. Alliance Nationale obtained 17 seats, the MMM secured nine, and the Rodrigues People's Organisation retained its two seats. Alliance Morisien's victory was largely credited to its economic reforms. Jugnauth's cabinet was inaugurated on 12 November.

The elections were marred by alleged irregularities, with many election staff reportedly inexperienced. Around 6,000 voters could not cast a ballot as their names were missing from the rolls. The organisation of the election faced criticism, with the electoral commission having just 30 days to prepare for the polls. The timing also came under scrutiny, as the elections were held at the same time as secondary school examinations. Alliance Morisien was reported to have heavily utilised state media.

== Background ==
At the 2014 snap election, the opposition Alliance Lepep, which was made up of the MSM, Parti Mauricien Sociale Démocrate (PMSD) and Muvman Liberater (ML), won an upset victory, securing 51 seats. The governing alliance, which comprised Prime Minister Navin Ramgoolam's Labour Party and former Prime Minister Paul Bérenger's Mauritian Militant Movement (MMM), won only 16 seats, despite opinion polls predicting the coalition would secure re-election. Ramgoolam lost his seat of Pamplemousses-Triolet. The Rodrigues People's Organisation won two seats. The Alliance Lepep leader, Anerood Jugnauth, became prime minister for a third time, having previously served from 1982 to 1995 and from 2000 to 2003. Jugnauth also held the largely ceremonial office of president from 2005 until 2012, when he resigned due to his disapproval of the Ramgoolam government's style of governance.

A key issue during the 2014 election was Ramgoolam's proposed amendments to delegate more powers to the presidency and introduce direct elections for the post, which Alliance Lepep opposed. The Labour Party-led government aimed to implement the reforms if it were to win re-election, after which Ramgoolam would run for the presidency. Jugnauth's alliance also campaigned on eliminating corruption. Ramgoolam and his government had been the subject of corruption scandals; he was arrested in February 2015 over charges of conspiracy and money laundering. Ramgoolam denied the allegations, and the charges were dropped in 2016 due to insufficient evidence.

=== Resignation of Anerood Jugnauth ===
In January 2017, Anerood Jugnauth resigned as prime minister, stating that he had accomplished all he had set out to achieve in government and wished to hand power to younger generations. Jugnauth denied allegations by Cabinet Minister Roshi Bhadain that he was forced to step down by an unnamed faction. Jugnauth was succeeded by his son, Finance Minister and MSM Leader Pravind Jugnauth, although he remained in cabinet. Despite attempts from the PMSD to have Deputy Prime Minister Xavier-Luc Duval ascend to the premiership, the elder Jugnauth held the opinion that the PMSD would only be entitled to hold the office of prime minister if it were the largest party in parliament. The PMSD withdrew from the government in December 2016, after Anerood Jugnauth's announcement, citing policy disagreements, depriving Alliance Lepep of its three-quarter majority needed to pass constitutional amendments. Duval subsequently became leader of the opposition, succeeding MMM Leader Paul Bérenger. Pravind Jugnauth's ascendance to the premiership was met with allegations of nepotism by the opposition.

== Electoral system ==
Constituencies used for the 2019 general election

The National Assembly has 62 directly elected members; 60 represent 20 three-seat constituencies, and two are elected from a constituency on the island of Rodrigues. The elections are held using the plurality block vote system, whereby voters have as many votes as seats available. The Electoral Commission divides the electorate into four communities: Hindus, Muslims, Sino-Mauritians and the general population; the latter comprises voters who do not belong to the first three. Mauritius employs the Best Loser System (BLS) to ensure all communities are guaranteed parliamentary representation proportional to their percentage of the population. If a community's share of MPs does not match its population percentage after a general election, the Electoral Supervisory Commission can appoint up to eight of the highest polling unsuccessful candidates from that community. The first four BLS members are selected regardless of their political affiliation. The other four are chosen from the party that has received the highest percentage of votes nationwide, to prevent BLS from changing an election outcome. Unless the president dissolves the National Assembly early, members serve a five-year term. A presidential decree mandated that all candidates declare their community affiliation, despite a law passed in 2014 making this requirement optional. The MMM denounced the decree as a step backwards for democracy, while Ashok Subron of Rezistans ek Alternativ filed a lawsuit to overturn it. The PMSD stated that the decree was warranted as the 2014 law was not a constitutional amendment.

Eligible candidates and voters are required to be at least 18 years old, citizens of the Commonwealth and have resided in Mauritius for at least two years before the nomination date. A total of 941,719 individuals were registered to vote in this election. Public officials stationed in Mauritius but enrolled in constituencies in Rodrigues or Agaléga and vice versa are eligible to apply for proxy voting. Candidates have to be proficient enough in English to participate in parliamentary procedures. They also require the nomination from at least six electors in their constituency and a deposit to be paid, which is refunded if they obtain at least 10% of the vote. Individuals ineligible to be contestants include those who have committed electoral offences, have served a prison sentence exceeding 12 months, have undisclosed government contracts or have undisclosed bankruptcy.

== Parties and candidates ==
The candidate nomination deadline was on 22 October. A total of 71 parties were registered to contest the election. Shortly before registering on 9 October, Prime Minister Jugnauth's Alliance Lepep was renamed Alliance Morisien. The bloc comprised Jugnauth's Militant Socialist Movement, Muvman Liberater, Plateforme Militante, and Mouvement Alan Ganoo. The other major coalition was Alliance Nationale, led by former Prime Minister Navin Ramgoolam, which comprised the Labour Party, Parti Mauricien Social Démocrate and Mouvement Jean Claude Barbier. The Mauritian Militant Movement, led by former Prime Minister Paul Bérenger, declined to enter an alliance this election. A total of 817 candidates contested the election, 249 of whom were independents. Alliance Mauricien, Alliance Nationale and the MMM each fielded 60 candidates.

| Major alliance | Member parties | Alliance leader | Candidates |
|---|---|---|---|
| Alliance Morisien | Militant Socialist Movement | Pravind Jugnauth | 47 |
| Alliance Morisien | Muvman Liberater | Pravind Jugnauth | 9 |
| Alliance Morisien | Mouvement Alan Ganoo | Pravind Jugnauth | 2 |
| Alliance Morisien | Plateforme Militante | Pravind Jugnauth | 2 |
| Alliance Nationale | Labour Party | Navin Ramgoolam | 46 |
| Alliance Nationale | Parti Mauricien Social Démocrate | Navin Ramgoolam | 12 |
| Alliance Nationale | Mouvement Jean Claude Barbier | Navin Ramgoolam | 2 |

== Campaign ==
The campaign period was short, lasting two weeks. The three major blocs, Alliance Morisien, Alliance Nationale, and the MMM, each released a manifesto promising similar economic populist initiatives focusing on pension schemes and youth unemployment and tackling drug trafficking and corruption. Prime Minister Jugnauth campaigned on his government's achievements since ascending to the premiership in 2017, which included the introduction of a minimum wage, tuition-free education at public universities, Labour law reform, an increase in pensions and the commencement of the first phase of the Light Railway Project, spanning from Port Louis to Rose Hill. The opposition further criticised Jugnauth's rise to the premiership as nepotistic. Ramgoolam stated that the election was a choice between a "family clan" and an "alliance for a free society." The former prime minister advocated for a reform of Mauritius' system of government and a review of the Best Loser System. Bérenger pledged to introduce a two-five-year term limit for the premiership if the MMM were to secure a victory. Jugnauth ruled out forming a coalition with the MMM in the event of a hung parliament resulting after the election and said Bérenger was unreliable.

Deepfake content was circulated during the campaign, targeting Alliance Nationale. Rumours spread that Alliance Morisien hired an Israeli team to produce the deepfake content and suppress freedom of expression on social media. Ken Arian, a senior advisor to Jugnauth, denied the allegations and dismissed claims that such an Israeli team was present in Mauritius, stating that Alliance Morisien did not have the time to pull off such an operation. A video titled Navingate was released shortly before the election. The clip claimed Ramgoolam had spent large sums of money on luxury goods during his previous tenure as prime minister and that he transferred funds out of Labour Party accounts to replenish his personal bank account. L'Express reported that the video was illegal as it displayed bank documents, in breach of the Bank of Mauritius Act. The Labour Party rejected the video's claims and held a public demonstration after its release.

== Conduct ==
Acting President Barlen Vyapoory dissolved parliament and issued the election writ on 6 October. Polling stations were open from 7:00 to 18:00. Voting centres in Agaléga and Rodrigues opened at 6:00, closing at 10:00 in Agaléga and 17:00 in Rodrigues. Vote counting began the day after the election. Over 6,000 individuals were unable to vote as their names were missing from the electoral roll, despite many having voted in previous elections and remaining in the same constituencies. Electoral Commissioner Irfan Rahman said the missing names resulted from electoral canvassers, who were confirming enrolments, being unable to reach many homes or track voters before the election. He assured the electoral commission set up an SMS system to mitigate the issue but noted that only around 3,000 voters used it.

Many election staff were allegedly inexperienced and insufficiently trained. One constituency was reportedly around 2,000 staff members short needed to conduct the election efficiently. In the Port Louis North & Montagne Longue constituency, an electoral officer lost a voter's identification card. An elector in the Montagne Blanche and Grande River South East constituency alleged that another individual had voted in her place. Kasenally Roukaya of the University of Mauritius said the less-than-ideal conduct stemmed from the electoral commission only having 30 days to prepare for the snap election. The commission's search for voting venues, often hosted by schools, was complicated by the election occurring around the same time as secondary school examinations.

Observer delegations from the African Union, the Southern African Development Community (SADC) and Organisation internationale de la Francophonie stated that the election was mostly free and fair. The African Union mission recommended the government allow for votes to be counted immediately after polling stations close. The SADC delegation called for the introduction of an ethics code for journalists, noting the lack of impartiality among some state-owned outlets.

== Results ==
Alliance Morisien won re-election, securing 42 seats. Alliance Nationale won 17, and the MMM secured nine. The Rodrigues People's Organisation retained its two seats, winning the Rodrigues constituency. The electoral supervisory commission appointed eight unsuccessful candidates to the National Assembly through the Best Loser System. Four contestants from Alliance Morisien were selected, along with three from Alliance Nationale and one MMM member. Ramgoolam failed to secure a seat for the second time in a row, losing in the constituency of Montagne Blanche-Grand River South East. Due to the electoral system, Alliance Morisien secured a majority of seats despite obtaining only 37% of the vote. The disproportionate seat allocation to votes received, left Mauritius with a Gallagher index measurement of 17.94. Voter turnout was 77%, an increase from 74% in 2014.

| Party or alliance | | Votes | % | Seats | | | |
| Party or alliance | | Votes | % | Cons | BL | Total | +/– |
|---|---|---|---|---|---|---|---|
| Alliance Morisien | Militant Socialist Movement | 684,459 | 32.04 | 33 | 3 | 36 | +3 |
| Alliance Morisien | Muvman Liberater | 68,058 | 3.19 | 3 | 0 | 3 | −4 |
| Alliance Morisien | Mouvement Alan Ganoo | 30,963 | 1.45 | 1 | 1 | 2 | New |
| Alliance Morisien | Plateforme Militante | 21,556 | 1.01 | 1 | 0 | 1 | New |
| Alliance Morisien | Total | 805,036 | 37.68 | 38 | 4 | 42 | New |
| Alliance Nationale | Labour Party | 555,864 | 26.02 | 10 | 2 | 12 | +8 |
| Alliance Nationale | Parti Mauricien Social Démocrate | 136,144 | 6.37 | 4 | 1 | 5 | −6 |
| Alliance Nationale | Mouvement Jean Claude Barbier | 18,774 | 0.88 | 0 | 0 | 0 | New |
| Alliance Nationale | Total | 710,782 | 33.27 | 14 | 3 | 17 | New |
| Mauritian Militant Movement | | 439,402 | 20.57 | 8 | 1 | 9 | −3 |
| Reform Party | | 30,350 | 1.42 | 0 | 0 | 0 | New |
| Rodrigues People's Organisation | | 20,777 | 0.97 | 2 | 0 | 2 | 0 |
| Parti Kreol Morisien | | 19,302 | 0.90 | 0 | 0 | 0 | New |
| 100 Citoyens | | 19,199 | 0.90 | 0 | 0 | 0 | New |
| Mauritian Solidarity Front | | 12,898 | 0.60 | 0 | 0 | 0 | 0 |
| Lalians Lespwar | | 7,104 | 0.33 | 0 | 0 | 0 | New |
| Parti Malin | | 5,291 | 0.25 | 0 | 0 | 0 | 0 |
| Regroupement Socialiste Militant | | 4,849 | 0.23 | 0 | 0 | 0 | New |
| Les Verts Fraternels | | 4,803 | 0.22 | 0 | 0 | 0 | 0 |
| Lalit | | 4,119 | 0.19 | 0 | 0 | 0 | 0 |
| Mouvement Mauricien Social Démocrate | | 3,568 | 0.17 | 0 | 0 | 0 | 0 |
| Forum des Citoyens Libres | | 3,189 | 0.15 | 0 | 0 | 0 | 0 |
| Rodrigues Movement | | 2,462 | 0.12 | 0 | 0 | 0 | 0 |
| Front Patriotique Rodriguais Ecologique | | 1,656 | 0.08 | 0 | 0 | 0 | New |
| Mouvman Zeness Morisien | | 1,409 | 0.07 | 0 | 0 | 0 | New |
| Parti Lumière | | 1,307 | 0.06 | 0 | 0 | 0 | New |
| Muvman Independantis Rodriguais | | 1,231 | 0.06 | 0 | 0 | 0 | 0 |
| Mouvement Ene Sel Direction | | 1,080 | 0.05 | 0 | 0 | 0 | 0 |
| Mouvement Democratique Mauricien | | 588 | 0.03 | 0 | 0 | 0 | New |
| Ralliement Citoyen Pour La Patrie | | 503 | 0.02 | 0 | 0 | 0 | New |
| Republicain En Marche | | 493 | 0.02 | 0 | 0 | 0 | New |
| Front Socialiste | | 443 | 0.02 | 0 | 0 | 0 | 0 |
| Rassemblement Socialiste Mauricien | | 342 | 0.02 | 0 | 0 | 0 | 0 |
| Mouvement Entrepreneurs | | 285 | 0.01 | 0 | 0 | 0 | New |
| Small Planters, Labourers and Farmers Party | | 275 | 0.01 | 0 | 0 | 0 | New |
| Liberte sans Frontiere | | 236 | 0.01 | 0 | 0 | 0 | New |
| La Republique En Marche | | 228 | 0.01 | 0 | 0 | 0 | New |
| Mouvement Authentique Mauricien | | 206 | 0.01 | 0 | 0 | 0 | 0 |
| Party L'histoire Moris Selectif | | 169 | 0.01 | 0 | 0 | 0 | New |
| La Plateforme Sociale Curepipienne | | 78 | 0.00 | 0 | 0 | 0 | New |
| Four Cats Political Party | | 70 | 0.00 | 0 | 0 | 0 | 0 |
| Alliance pour L'Unité Mauricienne | | 61 | 0.00 | 0 | 0 | 0 | New |
| Mauritian National Congress | | 57 | 0.00 | 0 | 0 | 0 | 0 |
| Socialiste Militant Progressiste | | 53 | 0.00 | 0 | 0 | 0 | New |
| Independents | | 32,512 | 1.52 | 0 | 0 | 0 | 0 |
| Total | | 2,136,413 | 100.00 | 62 | 8 | 70 | +1 |
| Valid votes | | 718,398 | 99.06 | | | | |
| Invalid/blank votes | | 6,838 | 0.94 | | | | |
| Total votes | | 725,236 | 100.00 | | | | |
| Registered voters/turnout | | 941,719 | 77.01 | | | | |
Source: OEC, OEC, OEC, OEC

=== By constituency ===
| Constituency | | MP | Party | Notes |
|---|---|---|---|---|
| 1 | Grand River North West– Port Louis West | Fabrice David | PTr | Elected |
| 1 | Grand River North West– Port Louis West | Dorine Chukowry | MSM | Elected |
| 1 | Grand River North West– Port Louis West | Patrice Armance | PMSD | Reelected |
| 1 | Grand River North West– Port Louis West | Arianne Navarre-Marie | MMM | Best Loser |
| 2 | Port Louis South– Port Louis Central | Osman Mahomed | PTr | Reelected |
| 2 | Port Louis South– Port Louis Central | Reza Uteem | MMM | Reelected |
| 2 | Port Louis South– Port Louis Central | Ismaël Aumeer | PTr | Elected |
| 3 | Port Louis Maritime– Port Louis East | Shakeel Mohamed | PTr | Reelected |
| 3 | Port Louis Maritime– Port Louis East | Salim Abbas Mamode | PMSD | Reelected |
| 3 | Port Louis Maritime– Port Louis East | Aadil Ameer Meea | MMM | Reelected |
| 3 | Port Louis Maritime– Port Louis East | Ehsan Juman | PTr | Best Loser |
| 3 | Port Louis Maritime– Port Louis East | Anwar Husnoo | MSM | Best Loser; Reelected |
| 4 | Port Louis North– Montagne Longue | Joe Lesjongard | MSM | Reelected |
| 4 | Port Louis North– Montagne Longue | Subhasnee | MSM | Elected |
| 4 | Port Louis North– Montagne Longue | Joanne Tour | MSM | Elected |
| 5 | Pamplemousses–Triolet | Soodesh Callichurn | MSM | Reelected |
| 5 | Pamplemousses–Triolet | Sharvanand Ramkaun | MSM | Reelected |
| 5 | Pamplemousses–Triolet | Ranjiv Woochit | PTr | Elected |
| 6 | Grand Baie–Poudre D'Or | Sanjiv Ramdanee | MSM | Elected |
| 6 | Grand Baie–Poudre D'Or | Mahend Gungapersad | PTr | Elected |
| 6 | Grand Baie–Poudre D'Or | Avinash Teeluck | MSM | Elected |
| 7 | Piton–Riviere du Rempart | Maneesh Gobin | MSM | Reelected |
| 7 | Piton–Riviere du Rempart | Ravi Dhaliah | MSM | Elected |
| 7 | Piton–Riviere du Rempart | Kalpana Koonjoo-Shah | MSM | Elected |
| 8 | Quartier Militaire–Moka | Pravind Jugnauth | MSM | Reelected |
| 8 | Quartier Militaire–Moka | Leela Dookun-Luchoomun | MSM | Reelected |
| 8 | Quartier Militaire–Moka | Yogida Sawmynaden | MSM | Reelected |
| 9 | Flacq–Bon Accueil | Sudheer Maudhoo | MSM | Elected |
| 9 | Flacq–Bon Accueil | Deepak Balgobin | MSM | Elected |
| 9 | Flacq–Bon Accueil | Vikash Nuckcheddy | MSM | Elected |
| 10 | Montagne Blanche– Grand River South East | Vikram Hurdoyal | MSM | Elected |
| 10 | Montagne Blanche– Grand River South East | Zahid Nazurally | ML | Elected |
| 10 | Montagne Blanche– Grand River South East | Sunil Bholah | MSM | Reelected |
| 11 | Vieux Grand Port–Rose Belle | Mahen Seeruttun | MSM | Reelected |
| 11 | Vieux Grand Port–Rose Belle | Teenah Jutton | MSM | Elected |
| 11 | Vieux Grand Port–Rose Belle | Navina Ramyead | MSM | Elected |
| 12 | Mahebourg–Plaine Magnien | Ritish Ramful | PTr | Reelected |
| 12 | Mahebourg–Plaine Magnien | Bobby Hurreeram | MSM | Reelected |
| 12 | Mahebourg–Plaine Magnien | Kavi Doolub | MSM | Elected |
| 12 | Mahebourg–Plaine Magnien | Richard Duval | PMSD | Best Loser |
| 12 | Mahebourg–Plaine Magnien | Stephan Toussaint | MSM | Best Loser |
| 13 | Riviere des Anguilles–Souillac | Kailesh Jagutpal | MSM | Elected |
| 13 | Riviere des Anguilles–Souillac | Renganaden Padayachy | MSM | Elected |
| 13 | Riviere des Anguilles–Souillac | Ismaël Rawoo | ML | Elected |
| 14 | Savanne–Black River | Alan Ganoo | MAG | Reelected |
| 14 | Savanne–Black River | Sandra Mayotte | MSM | Elected |
| 14 | Savanne–Black River | Prakash Ramchurrun | MSM | Elected |
| 15 | La Caverne–Phoenix | Khushal Lobine | PMSD | Elected |
| 15 | La Caverne–Phoenix | Patrick Assirvaden | PTr | Elected |
| 15 | La Caverne–Phoenix | Gilbert Bablee | MSM | Elected |
| 16 | Vacoas–Floreal | Joanna Bérenger | MMM | Elected |
| 16 | Vacoas–Floreal | Nando Bodha | MSM | Reelected |
| 16 | Vacoas–Floreal | Ashley Ittoo | MSM | Elected |
| 16 | Vacoas–Floreal | Stéphanie Anquetil | PTr | Best Loser |
| 17 | Curepipe–Midlands | Steven Obeegadoo | PM | Elected |
| 17 | Curepipe–Midlands | Michael Sik Yuen | PTr | Elected |
| 17 | Curepipe–Midlands | Kenny Dhunoo | MSM | Elected |
| 18 | Belle Rose–Quatre Bornes | Arvin Boolell | PTr | Elected |
| 18 | Belle Rose–Quatre Bornes | Kavy Ramano | MSM | Reelected |
| 18 | Belle Rose–Quatre Bornes | Xavier-Luc Duval | PMSD | Reelected |
| 18 | Belle Rose–Quatre Bornes | Tania Diolle | MAG | Best Loser |
| 19 | Stanley–Rose Hill | Paul Bérenger | MMM | Reelected |
| 19 | Stanley–Rose Hill | Deven Nagalingum | MMM | Elected |
| 19 | Stanley–Rose Hill | Ivan Collendavelloo | ML | Reelected |
| 19 | Stanley–Rose Hill | Fazila Daureeawoo | MSM | Best Loser; Reelected |
| 20 | Beau Bassin–Petite Riviere | Rajesh Bhagwan | MMM | Reelected |
| 20 | Beau Bassin–Petite Riviere | Karen Foo Kune | MMM | Elected |
| 20 | Beau Bassin–Petite Riviere | Franco Quirin | MMM | Reelected |
| 21 | Rodrigues | Francisco François | OPR | Reelected |
| 21 | Rodrigues | Buisson Léopold | OPR | Reelected |
Source: Electoral Commission

== Aftermath ==
Pravind Jugnauth and his cabinet were sworn in at the State House on 12 November. Anerood Jugnauth stepped down from cabinet, relinquishing his role of mentor minister. Ivan Collendavelloo of the ML remained deputy prime minister. The first session of the Seventh National Assembly commenced on 21 November. That day, parliament elected Sooroojdev Phokeer, a former ambassador to Egypt and the United States, as speaker, succeeding Maya Hanoomanjee. Zahid Nazurally became deputy speaker. Despite leading the Labour Party to two consecutive defeats, the party decided to have Ramgoolam remain leader. The Labour Party selected Arvin Boolell to be the leader of the opposition.

Several marked ballots from the Port Louis North/Montagne Longue constituencies and Port Louis Maritime/Port Louis East were found astray outside counting centres a few days after the election. The police later launched an investigation into the incident. Kasenally attributed Alliance Morisien's victory to its economic policies and infrastructure projects. She also noted the governing coalition's advantage of incumbency and its extensive use of state media. The Electoral Supervisory Commission received complaints alleging the Mauritius Broadcasting Corporation's lack of impartiality during the campaign and favourable treatment of Alliance Morisien.

The opposition, including the Labour Party, the MMM, PMSD and the Reform Party, lodged electoral petitions in the Supreme Court, alleging irregularities such as undue influence and bribery. An activist, Soopramanien Kistnen, was found murdered at a sugar cane plantation in Moka in October 2020. Kisten was rumoured to be on the cusp of disclosing details of how 1,200 Bangladeshi nationals had been taken to vote multiple times in different constituencies and that the MSM had exceeded spending limits. Alliance Nationale's Surendra Dayal, who unsuccessfully contested Prime Minister Jugnauth's constituency of Quartier Militare and Moka, filed a lawsuit seeking to overturn the constituency's result. Dayal claimed that Jugnauth and the other two successful candidates, who were also from Alliance Morisien, had engaged in bribery and undue influence to win their seats. The case was dismissed on appeal in 2023.
