= Adrien Duval =

Mauritian politician (born 1990)

The Honourable Adrien Duval
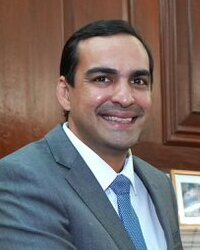
- Duval in 2024

Member of Parliament; for Port Louis North and Montagne Longue Best Loser
- Incumbent
- Assumed office 29 November 2024

Speaker of the National Assembly Nominated
- In office 18 July 2024 – 5 October 2024
- Preceded by: Sooroojdev Phokeer
- Succeeded by: Shirin Aumeeruddy-Cziffra

Deputy Speaker of the National Assembly
- In office 22 December 2014 – 19 December 2016
- Speaker: Maya Hanoomanjee
- Preceded by: Pradeep Peetumber
- Succeeded by: Sanjeev Teeluckdharry

Member of Parliament; for Curepipe and Midlands
- In office 11 December 2014 – 6 October 2019
- Preceded by: Éric Guimbeau
- Succeeded by: Louis Steven Obeegadoo

Personal details
- Born: 21 September 1990 (age 35) Mauritius
- Party: Parti Mauricien Social Démocrate
- Relations: Gaëtan Duval (grandfather); Hervé Duval (granduncle); Richard Duval (uncle)
- Parent: Xavier-Luc Duval (father)
- Occupation: Barrister

Adrien Charles Duval (born 21 September 1990) is a Mauritian politician and barrister who was the Speaker of the National Assembly.

== Early life, education and career ==
Adrien Duval is the son of Xavier-Luc Duval, leader of the PMSD, and Jennifer Duval and grand son of Sir Gaëtan Duval. His father and grandfather are both former deputy prime ministers.

After completing legal studies at the University of Kent and the University of Law in England, Adrien Duval returned to Mauritius and started his pupillage at the Office of the Director of Public Prosecution under Rashid Ahmine's supervision. He then continued his training at the law firms of Marc Hein and Rajesh Bucktowonsing.

== Political career ==
Duval ran for the National Assembly as a candidate of Parti Mauricien Social Démocrate under the Alliance Lepep coalition in the constituency of Curepipe–Midlands in 2014. He was elected as the first member of the constituency and afterwards, Duval was nominated and elected as deputy speaker of the National Assembly on 22 December 2014. At 24, Duval became the youngest MP in the assembly and the youngest incumbent deputy speaker at the time. Following the departure of his party from the government on 19 December 2016, Duval resigned from his office.

Duval ran for re-election in 2019 under the Alliance Nationale banner in the same constituency, however he was not re-elected. In July 2024, as part of a new deal between the PMSD and the ruling government, he was nominated as Speaker of National Assembly of Mauritius following Sooroojdev Phokeer's resignation. He was sworn in on 18 July, just 4 months before the next elections. At 33, he also became the youngest speaker of a national legislature at his election. In anticipation of the upcoming general election, Duval resigned as speaker on 5 October.

At the elections held in November 2024, after standing as a candidate of Alliance Lepep in the constituency of Port Louis North–Montagne Longue, Duval was not elected. But he secured a seat in the National Assembly after being nominated as Best Loser. He was the only other opposition member to secure a seat in the National Assembly, besides Joe Lesjongard of the Militant Socialist Movement.

== Scandals ==
=== 2022 Denial and refusal to undergo blood alcohol testing after serious car accident ===
On 21 September 2022, he was involved in a car accident with another vehicle, resulting in bodily harm for the other driver and is currently being prosecuted for driving under influence and refusal to submit to toxicological tests. On the site of the accident, he notoriously lied to the officers claiming he was a passenger and not driving before later retracting his statement.

=== 2024 Pension for life after being Speaker for 4 months ===
Adrien Duval's nomination as Speaker in July 2024, only 4 months before the next elections and despite not having been elected in 2019, attracted bad publicity and highlighted another inadequacy in Mauritian law, leaving it open to be abused by politicians. Roshi Bhadain commented that his party would cancel such lavish privileges which are very costly to taxpayers, this one resulting in the payment of Rs 375,000 monthly. Journalist Subash Gobine questioned why Jacques Panglose, another non-elected member of the PMSD and much more experienced and recognised legal practitioner than Duval, was not nominated for this short-term lucrative role.
