= 2014 Mauritian general election =

- 10 December 2014

All 62 directly elected seats in the National Assembly (and up to 8 BLS seats)
- Turnout: 74.11% (▼3.71 pp)
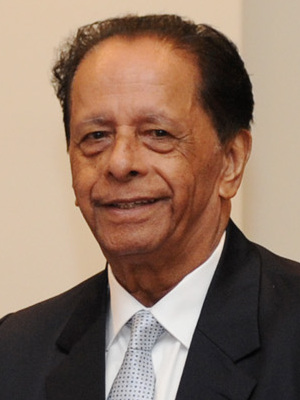

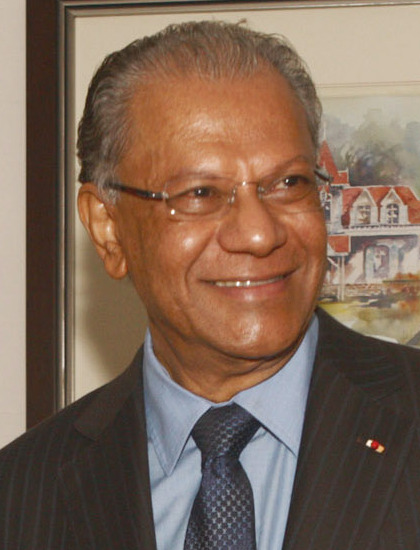
| | First party | Second party |
|---|---|---|
| Leader | Anerood Jugnauth | Navin Ramgoolam |
| Party | MSM | Labour |
| Alliance | Alliance Lepep | Unité et de la Modernité |
| Seats won | 33 | 4 |
| Seat change | ▲20 | ▼24 |
| Popular vote | 691,062 | 390,768 |
| Percentage | 33.88% | 19.16% |
| Alliance seats | 51 | 16 |
| Popular vote | 1,016,551 | 785,645 |
| Alliance % | 49.83% | 38.51% |
- Alliance results by constituency. The colour shade shows the percentage of the elected candidate with the highest number of votes
Prime Minister before election
Navin Ramgoolam
Labour
Subsequent Prime Minister
Anerood Jugnauth
MSM

General elections were held in Mauritius on 10 December 2014. Results gave the opposition coalition of Alliance Lepep an upset victory, securing 47 of the directly elected seats under the leadership of Sir Anerood Jugnauth. The Alliance de l'Unité et de la Modernité, composed of the Labour Party and the Mauritian Militant Movement, led by incumbent prime minister, Navin Ramgoolam, only won a total of 13 directly elected seats.

Ramgoolam had governed the country since 2005 for two consecutive terms and was seeking a third term. The election was seen as a referendum to the current government's proposal to increase the powers of the president and making the position directly electable and introducing a proportional system, changing the current electoral system. Ramgoolam and his alliance with Paul Bérenger was seen as the clear favourite to win the election and would easily be able to adopt the proposed changes. Jugnauth's Alliance Lepep, led by the Militant Socialist Movement with the Parti Mauricien Social Démocrate and the Muvman Liberater, heavily opposed the change.

In the aftermath of the election, Ramgoolam lost his own seat and his own party relegated to a mere total of four seats, with Bérenger's party winning 12 seats out of the 16 that the alliance achieved. He conceded defeat after voters rejected his proposals. Alliance Lepep won a total of 51 seats, with the Parti Mauricien Social Démocrate achieving its best result since the 1970s.

The 84-year old Jugnauth, forming his sixth and final government, was appointed as prime minister on 14 December, effective from 13 December. He and his ministers were fully sworn in on 17 December. Eventually, he would give way in 2017 to his son, Pravind, after two years in the premiership and resign, becoming Minister Mentor under his son's government.

== Background ==
In the aftermath of the general election held in 2010, Navin Ramgoolam was reelected for a second consecutive term as prime minister under the coalition banner of Alliance de l'Avenir, composed of his party, Labour (PTr), and two other natural governing parties in the country, the Militant Socialist Movement (MSM), led by Pravind Jugnauth, and the Parti Mauricien Social Démocrate (PMSD), led by Xavier-Luc Duval.

Under the new government, Ramgoolam remained as premier whilst Jugnauth was appointed as finance minister and Duval as minister of social integration. Both leaders were also appointed as vice-prime minister in addition to their portfolios.

Paul Bérenger's Mauritian Militant Movement (MMM) contested the election along with two other minor parties under the coalition of Alliance du Coeur, which lost. Bérenger became leader of the opposition in the aftermath of the election.

=== MedPoint affair ===
On 22 July 2011, health minister Maya Hanoomanjee, from the MSM, was arrested by the Independent Commission Against Corruption (ICAC) following the government's purchase of the MedPoint clinic in December 2010. Hanoomanjee was accused of having conflict of interest with the purchase, after being dissatisfied with the valuation of the clinic. MedPoint was originally valued at Rs 75 million and Hanoomanjee thereafter requested for a revalution in September 2010, which result with the government purchasing the clinic for Rs 144.7 million.

The clinic was owned by Krishnan Malhotra and Shalini Jugnauth-Malhotra, the former being the brother-in-law and the latter the sister of finance minister Pravind Jugnauth, as well as the daughter of former prime minister and incumbent president Anerood Jugnauth. During the scandal, the clinic was often referred to as the Jugnauth family's clinic. The goal of the purchase was to convert the hospital into a specialised clinic.

Under pressure from the scandal, Hanoomanjee resigned from the government on 26 July, with her fellow colleagues from the MSM also filing their resignations on the same day. Jugnauth, Nando Bodha (minister of tourism), Showkutally Soodhun (minister of industry), Leela Devi Dookun (minister of social security) and Ashit Gungah (minister of public service) all left the government, leaving Ramgoolam's government with 36 seats in the National Assembly against 33 seats of the opposition.

Two months after leaving the government, Jugnauth was also arrested on 22 September over corruption charges and conflicts of interest under the Prevention of Corruption Act.

=== Resignation of Anerood Jugnauth as president ===
Following further conflicts with the government and Ramgoolam, as well as the aftermath of the MedClinic affair, Anerood Jugnauth decided to resign the presidency on 31 March 2012, citing disagreement with the "philosophy of the government" and the direction of the country under Ramgoolam's government, accusing it of leading the country to poverty. This would see the return and comeback of the former premier and statesman into active politics.

The relationship between the premier and the president had erupted following Paul Bérenger's announcement that a new opposition alliance was under works with his party, Mauritian Militant Movement, and Jugnauth's Militant Socialist Movement, a recreation of the MSM/MMM alliance in the early 2000s and dubbed as Remake 2000. Bérenger had several meetings with Jugnauth at the State House in Port Louis and Ramgoolam had asked the latter to confirm or deny the statement made by Bérenger and, if in the case of confirmation, to resign the presidency.

== Electoral system ==
Constituencies used for the 2014 general election

The National Assembly has 62 directly elected members; 60 represent 20 three-seat constituencies, and two are elected from a constituency on the island of Rodrigues. The elections are held using the plurality block vote system with panachage, whereby voters have as many votes as seats available. The Electoral Commission divides the electorate into four communities: Hindus, Muslims, Sino-Mauritians and the general population; the latter comprises voters who do not belong to the first three. Mauritius employs the Best Loser System (BLS) to ensure all communities are guaranteed parliamentary representation proportional to their percentage of the population. If a community's share of MPs does not match its population percentage after a general election, the Electoral Supervisory Commission can appoint up to eight of the highest polling unsuccessful candidates from that community. The first four BLS members are selected regardless of their political affiliation. The other four are chosen from the party that has received the highest percentage of votes nationwide, to prevent BLS from changing an election outcome. Unless the president dissolves the National Assembly early, members serve a five-year term.

Eligible candidates and voters are required to be at least 18 years old, citizens of the Commonwealth and have resided in Mauritius for at least two years before the nomination date. A total of 936,975 individuals were registered to vote in this election. Public officials stationed in Mauritius but enrolled in constituencies in Rodrigues or Agaléga and vice versa are eligible to apply for proxy voting. Since 2014, it has been optional for candidates to declare which community they belong to. Contestants who refuse to affiliate with a community are ineligible for a Best Loser nomination. Candidates have to be proficient enough in English to participate in parliamentary procedures. They also require the nomination from at least six electors in their constituency and a deposit to be paid, which is refunded if they obtain at least 10% of the vote. Individuals ineligible to be contestants include those who have committed electoral offences, have served a prison sentence exceeding 12 months, have undisclosed government contracts or have undisclosed bankruptcy.

== Schedule ==
Prime Minister Ramgoolam advised the president, Kailash Purryag, to dissolve the National Assembly on 6 October 2014. The writ for the election was issued on 7 November, with nomination day being on 24 November. The date for the election was set to 10 December. Two days later, on 12 December, the determination of the best loser seats were made based on the official returns.

| Date | Event |
|---|---|
| 6 October | The 6th National Assembly is dissolved |
| 7 November | The president issues the writ for the election |
| 24 November | Nomination day |
| 10 December | Polling day |
| 12 December | Allocation of best loser seats |

== Parties and candidates ==
In September 2014, the leaders of the Labour Party and the Mauritian Militant Movement, Navin Ramgoolam and Paul Berenger, signed an agreement to enter into an electoral alliance for the next general election. The plan of this agreement vowed to push through constitutional changes giving greater power to the now-ceremonial role of president.

Soon after, the Militant Socialist Movement, the Parti Mauricien Social Démocrate and the Muvman Liberater (a new party formed from a break-up with the MMM due to their coalition with the PTR) formed a coalition to face the PTR–MMM Alliance in the next general election.

The Labour Party and the MMM each proposed 30 candidates, with each party having either one or two candidates in every mainland constituency. Like other mainland parties, however, they did not contest the two seats allocated to the island of Rodrigues.

| Major alliance | Member parties | Alliance leader | Candidates |
|---|---|---|---|
| Alliance de l'Unité et de la Modernité | Labour Party | Navin Ramgoolam | 30 |
| Alliance de l'Unité et de la Modernité | Mauritian Militant Movement | Navin Ramgoolam | 30 |
| Alliance Lepep | Militant Socialist Movement | Anerood Jugnauth | 38 |
| Alliance Lepep | Parti Mauricien Social Démocrate | Anerood Jugnauth | 14 |
| Alliance Lepep | Muvman Liberater | Anerood Jugnauth | 8 |

== Campaign ==
=== Alliance of Unity and Modernity ===
The governmental alliance of the Labour Party and the Mauritian Militant Movement, under the name Alliance de l'Unité et de la Modernité (Alliance of Unity and Modernity), proposed the implementation of a Second Republic under a stronger and powerful presidential system.

The current system is purely based on the Westminster style of government where the head of state (being the President) is a ceremonial figurehead with very few executive powers. Under the PTR–MMM agreement, the new President would be elected through a single-round election across the country. Additional powers would include the prerogative to preside over the cabinet of ministers (currently led by the Prime Minister), dissolve the National Assembly, recommendations in various institutions including the appointment of ministers. The President would also be able to address the National Assembly as and when required, and would be elected for a 7-year term, as opposed to the five-year term served by the National Assembly.

While some political observers define this agreement as innovative (re-balancing the powers which are concentrated in the hands of the Prime Minister) and a unification of the population through votes (as both parties have similar electorates in numbers), other people mention that Ramgoolam had always favored a presidential system of government while Berenger had argued for a Second Republic since 1987.

The agreement concluded that if the coalition wins a three-quarters majority in parliament, a bill would be passed to implement the new republic, with Navin Ramgoolam resigning to present himself as a presidential candidate while Paul Berenger would replace him as Prime Minister.

=== Alliance Lepep ===
The Alliance Lepep (Alliance of the People) is composed of three parties and is led by Anerood Jugnauth. It was formed as a response to the formation of the PTR–MMM alliance. The program of the Alliance was mainly on the following measures that would be taken if the Alliance formed the next government. They are as follows:

- Review the Driver’s license penalty points system:

The alliance maintained that the point system is inappropriate and that it misapplied and penalizes professional drivers. However, it does not say whether the system will be fully or partially abolished or new criteria will apply.

- Identity card "Data Bank" to be destroyed:

As a citizen, Pravind Jugnauth initiated a case concerning the new identity card in the Supreme Court. He believes that giving and storing personal information including fingerprints and 3G scanned passport photos is an invasion of privacy. He promised that the “Data Bank” storing the data would be destroyed.

- Implement a decrease in prices of Gasoline and diesel.
- Introduce private TV:

The MSM–PMSD–ML alliance promised to introduce private television.

- Arrange MBC:

The MBC Act will be reviewed to increase more impartiality in political and national coverage in a view to protect free and fair election campaigns.

- Old age pension scheme at Rs 5000/month:

The old age pension which is currently at Rs 3623 (US$115) per month will be increased to Rs 5000 (US$157) per month.

- Syndicate police
- Minimum Wage:

Introduction of a minimum national wage rate, a policy that was implemented in 2018

== Results ==
Election results were declared the following day after the election. Alliance Lepep won a total of 51 seats against the Alliance de l'Unité et de la Modernité's 16 seats. Amongst the 47 constituency seats won by Alliance Lepep, 33 were won by the MSM; PMSD and ML each received seven seats. The Alliance de l'Unité et de la Modernité won 13 constituency seats, with the MMM receiving nine and Labour with four seats. The remaining two elected seats went to the Organisation du Peuple Rodriguais (OPR).

Under the best loser system, the Electoral Commissioner's Office designated 7 additional seats from the non-elected candidates to occupy the National Assembly based on the religious and ethnic declarations of the candidates not elected. Out of the seven best loser seats that were allocated in this election, the Alliance Lepep received four seats, which were all taken by the PMSD, and the Alliance de l'Unité et de la Modernité received three seats, all allocated to the MMM.

By party breakdown, in total, the Militant Socialist Movement received 33 seats, the Parti Mauricien Social Démocrate with 11 seats and the Muvman Liberater with 7 seats in the Alliance Lepep's 51 seats. On the other hand, the Alliance de l'Unité et de la Modernité's 16 seats were divided between the Mauritian Militant Movement's total of 12 seats whilst the Labour Party's 4 seats.

936,975 individuals were registered to vote in this election and the turnout was 74.11%.

| Party or alliance | | Votes | % | Seats | | | |
| Party or alliance | | Votes | % | Cons | BL | Total | +/– |
|---|---|---|---|---|---|---|---|
| Alliance Lepep | Militant Socialist Movement | 691,062 | 33.88 | 33 | 0 | 33 | +20 |
| Alliance Lepep | Parti Mauricien Social Démocrate | 198,968 | 9.75 | 7 | 4 | 11 | +7 |
| Alliance Lepep | Muvman Liberater | 126,521 | 6.20 | 7 | 0 | 7 | New |
| Alliance Lepep | Total | 1,016,551 | 49.83 | 47 | 4 | 51 | New |
| Alliance de l'Unité et de la Modernité | Mauritian Militant Movement | 394,877 | 19.36 | 9 | 3 | 12 | –7 |
| Alliance de l'Unité et de la Modernité | Labour Party | 390,768 | 19.16 | 4 | 0 | 4 | –24 |
| Alliance de l'Unité et de la Modernité | Total | 785,645 | 38.51 | 13 | 3 | 16 | –31 |
| Mauritian Solidarity Front | | 41,815 | 2.05 | 0 | 0 | 0 | –1 |
| Rezistans ek Alternativ | | 23,117 | 1.13 | 0 | 0 | 0 | New |
| Rodrigues People's Organisation | | 21,874 | 1.07 | 2 | 0 | 2 | +1 |
| Mouvement Mauricien Social Démocrate | | 19,338 | 0.95 | 0 | 0 | 0 | –1 |
| Lalit | | 11,407 | 0.56 | 0 | 0 | 0 | New |
| Rodrigues Movement | | 11,113 | 0.54 | 0 | 0 | 0 | –2 |
| Agreement for Parliamentary Democracy | | 10,548 | 0.52 | 0 | 0 | 0 | New |
| Les Verts Fraternels | | 10,191 | 0.50 | 0 | 0 | 0 | 0 |
| Réveille des Jeunes | | 9,775 | 0.48 | 0 | 0 | 0 | New |
| Parti Justice Sociale | | 8,395 | 0.41 | 0 | 0 | 0 | New |
| Forum des Citoyens Libres | | 8,210 | 0.40 | 0 | 0 | 0 | 0 |
| Rodrigues Militant Movement–Rodrigues Patriotic Front | | 5,787 | 0.28 | 0 | 0 | 0 | New |
| Parti Malin | | 5,214 | 0.26 | 0 | 0 | 0 | 0 |
| Mouvement Authentique Mauricien | | 4,071 | 0.20 | 0 | 0 | 0 | 0 |
| The Liberals | | 3,256 | 0.16 | 0 | 0 | 0 | New |
| Ensam | | 2,363 | 0.12 | 0 | 0 | 0 | New |
| Muvman Travayis Militant | | 2,216 | 0.11 | 0 | 0 | 0 | New |
| Mouvement Ene Sel Direction | | 1,853 | 0.09 | 0 | 0 | 0 | New |
| Parti Action Liberal | | 1,570 | 0.08 | 0 | 0 | 0 | 0 |
| Union Patriots Ilois Mauriciens | | 1,293 | 0.06 | 0 | 0 | 0 | 0 |
| Mouvement Travailleurs Mauricien | | 1,027 | 0.05 | 0 | 0 | 0 | 0 |
| Front Socialiste | | 1,005 | 0.05 | 0 | 0 | 0 | 0 |
| Militant Lepep Movement | | 563 | 0.03 | 0 | 0 | 0 | New |
| Parti du Peuple Mauricien | | 548 | 0.03 | 0 | 0 | 0 | 0 |
| Parti Tireurs de Sable | | 542 | 0.03 | 0 | 0 | 0 | 0 |
| Link to Build | | 448 | 0.02 | 0 | 0 | 0 | New |
| Independent Forward Bloc | | 423 | 0.02 | 0 | 0 | 0 | New |
| Ti Zwazo | | 398 | 0.02 | 0 | 0 | 0 | New |
| Muvman Independantis Rodriguais | | 388 | 0.02 | 0 | 0 | 0 | New |
| Rassemblement Socialiste Mauricien | | 351 | 0.02 | 0 | 0 | 0 | 0 |
| Poor People Party | | 349 | 0.02 | 0 | 0 | 0 | New |
| Parti Democratie Mauricienne | | 320 | 0.02 | 0 | 0 | 0 | New |
| Front Patriotique Mauricien | | 314 | 0.02 | 0 | 0 | 0 | New |
| Front Liberation National | | 271 | 0.01 | 0 | 0 | 0 | New |
| Mouvement pour la Liberation du Peuple | | 171 | 0.01 | 0 | 0 | 0 | New |
| Regional Assembly Man-Animal-Nature | | 156 | 0.01 | 0 | 0 | 0 | New |
| Mauritius New Generation Forces | | 145 | 0.01 | 0 | 0 | 0 | New |
| Mouvement Socialist National | | 121 | 0.01 | 0 | 0 | 0 | New |
| Mauritian National Congress | | 115 | 0.01 | 0 | 0 | 0 | New |
| Four Cats Political Party | | 66 | 0.00 | 0 | 0 | 0 | New |
| Mauritian Action Committee | | 63 | 0.00 | 0 | 0 | 0 | New |
| Mauritius Party Rights | | 33 | 0.00 | 0 | 0 | 0 | 0 |
| Independents | | 26,479 | 1.30 | 0 | 0 | 0 | 0 |
| Total | | 2,039,898 | 100.00 | 62 | 7 | 69 | 0 |
| Valid votes | | 686,517 | 98.87 | | | | |
| Invalid/blank votes | | 7,843 | 1.13 | | | | |
| Total votes | | 694,360 | 100.00 | | | | |
| Registered voters/turnout | | 936,975 | 74.11 | | | | |
Source: OEC, OEC, IPU, Alliance candidate affiliations:

=== By constituency ===
| Constituency | | MP | Party | Notes |
|---|---|---|---|---|
| 1 | Grand River North West– Port Louis West | Patrice Armance | PMSD | Elected |
| 1 | Grand River North West– Port Louis West | Danielle Selvon | MSM | Elected |
| 1 | Grand River North West– Port Louis West | Veda Baloomoody | MMM | Reelected |
| 1 | Grand River North West– Port Louis West | Alain Wong | PMSD | Best Loser |
| 1 | Grand River North West– Port Louis West | Jean Claude Barbier | MMM | Best Loser; Reelected |
| 2 | Port Louis South– Port Louis Central | Reza Uteem | MMM | Reelected |
| 2 | Port Louis South– Port Louis Central | Roubina Jadoo | MSM | Elected |
| 2 | Port Louis South– Port Louis Central | Osman Mahomed | PTr | Elected |
| 3 | Port Louis Maritime– Port Louis East | Shakeel Mohamed | PTr | Reelected |
| 3 | Port Louis Maritime– Port Louis East | Aadil Ameer Meea | MMM | Reelected |
| 3 | Port Louis Maritime– Port Louis East | Anwar Husnoo | ML | Elected |
| 3 | Port Louis Maritime– Port Louis East | Salim Abbas Mamode | PMSD | Best Loser |
| 4 | Port Louis North– Montagne Longue | Aurore Perraud | PMSD | Reelected |
| 4 | Port Louis North– Montagne Longue | Vikash Oree | MSM | Elected |
| 4 | Port Louis North– Montagne Longue | Marie-Claire Monty | PMSD | Elected |
| 5 | Pamplemousses–Triolet | Soodesh Callichurn | MSM | Elected |
| 5 | Pamplemousses–Triolet | Sanjeev Teeluckdharry | MSM | Elected |
| 5 | Pamplemousses–Triolet | Sarvanand Ramkaun | MSM | Elected |
| 6 | Grand Baie–Poudre D'Or | Ashit Gungah | MSM | Reelected |
| 6 | Grand Baie–Poudre D'Or | Sudesh Rughoobur | MSM | Elected |
| 6 | Grand Baie–Poudre D'Or | Sangeet Fowdar | ML | Elected |
| 7 | Piton–Riviere du Rempart | Anerood Jugnauth | MSM | Elected |
| 7 | Piton–Riviere du Rempart | Vishnu Lutchmeenaraidoo | MSM | Elected |
| 7 | Piton–Riviere du Rempart | Ravi Rutnah | ML | Elected |
| 8 | Quartier Militaire–Moka | Leela Dookun | MSM | Reelected |
| 8 | Quartier Militaire–Moka | Pravind Jugnauth | MSM | Reelected |
| 8 | Quartier Militaire–Moka | Yogida Sawmynaden | MSM | Elected |
| 9 | Flacq–Bon Accueil | Raj Dayal | MSM | Elected |
| 9 | Flacq–Bon Accueil | Raj Rampertab | MSM | Elected |
| 9 | Flacq–Bon Accueil | Pradeep Roopun | MSM | Reelected |
| 10 | Montagne Blanche– Grand River South East | Sudhir Sesungkur | MSM | Elected |
| 10 | Montagne Blanche– Grand River South East | Sunil Bholah | MSM | Elected |
| 10 | Montagne Blanche– Grand River South East | Kalyan Tarolah | MSM | Elected |
| 11 | Vieux Grand Port–Rose Belle | Mahen Seeruttun | MSM | Reelected |
| 11 | Vieux Grand Port–Rose Belle | Sandhya Boygah | MSM | Elected |
| 11 | Vieux Grand Port–Rose Belle | Prem Koonjoo | MSM | Elected |
| 12 | Mahebourg–Plaine Magnien | Bobby Hurreeram | MSM | Elected |
| 12 | Mahebourg–Plaine Magnien | Mahen Jhugroo | MSM | Reelected |
| 12 | Mahebourg–Plaine Magnien | Ritish Ramful | PTr | Elected |
| 12 | Mahebourg–Plaine Magnien | Thierry Henry | PMSD | Best Loser; Reelected |
| 13 | Riviere des Anguilles–Souillac | Maneesh Gobin | MSM | Elected |
| 13 | Riviere des Anguilles–Souillac | Zouberr Joomaye | MMM | Elected |
| 13 | Riviere des Anguilles–Souillac | Bashir Jahangeer | MSM | Elected |
| 14 | Savanne–Black River | Alan Ganoo | MMM | Reelected |
| 14 | Savanne–Black River | Joe Lesjongard | MMM | Elected |
| 14 | Savanne–Black River | Ezra Jhuboo | PTr | Elected |
| 15 | La Caverne–Phoenix | Tulsiraj Benydin | ML | Elected |
| 15 | La Caverne–Phoenix | Showkutally Soodhun | MSM | Reelected |
| 15 | La Caverne–Phoenix | Eddy Boissézon | ML | Elected |
| 15 | La Caverne–Phoenix | Raffick Sorefan | MMM | Best Loser; Reelected |
| 16 | Vacoas–Floreal | Nando Bodha | MSM | Reelected |
| 16 | Vacoas–Floreal | Baboo Sanataram | PMSD | Elected |
| 16 | Vacoas–Floreal | Étienne Sinatambou | MSM | Elected |
| 17 | Curepipe–Midlands | Adrien Duval | PMSD | Elected |
| 17 | Curepipe–Midlands | Stephan Toussaint | MSM | Elected |
| 17 | Curepipe–Midlands | Malini Sewocksingh | PMSD | Elected |
| 18 | Belle Rose–Quatre Bornes | Xavier-Luc Duval | PMSD | Reelected |
| 18 | Belle Rose–Quatre Bornes | Roshi Bhadain | MSM | Elected |
| 18 | Belle Rose–Quatre Bornes | Kavy Ramano | MMM | Reelected |
| 19 | Stanley–Rose Hill | Ivan Collendavelloo | ML | Elected |
| 19 | Stanley–Rose Hill | Fazila Daureeawoo | MSM | Elected |
| 19 | Stanley–Rose Hill | Paul Bérenger | MMM | Reelected |
| 20 | Beau Bassin–Petite Riviere | Rajesh Bhagwan | MMM | Reelected |
| 20 | Beau Bassin–Petite Riviere | Anil Gayan | ML | Elected |
| 20 | Beau Bassin–Petite Riviere | Alain Aliphon | MSM | Elected |
| 20 | Beau Bassin–Petite Riviere | Franco Quirin | MMM | Best Loser; Reelected |
| 20 | Beau Bassin–Petite Riviere | Guito Lepoigneur | PMSD | Best Loser |
| 21 | Rodrigues | Francisco François | OPR | Reelected |
| 21 | Rodrigues | Buisson Léopold | OPR | Elected |
Source: OEC, OEC

== Aftermath ==
Following the declaration of results, Alliance Lepep leader, Anerood Jugnauth, announced in a press conference that his administration will start working on the programme they have been elected to and promised to put the country "back on track for another economic miracle."

In a broadcast from the state-owned television station on 12 December 2014, Navin Ramgoolam conceded his defeated and congratulated Jugnauth's alliance, wishing them good luck. He also thanked his constituency after his defeat in his own seat. Thereafter, Ramgoolam submitted his and his cabinet's resignation to the president on 13 December.

Jugnauth was tasked to form a new government by the president, Kailash Purryag, and received his appointment on 14 December, with the appointment being backdated to 13 December. Shortly afterwards, Jugnauth and his cabinet were sworn in at State House in Port Louis on 17 December. At 84 years old, Jugnauth became prime minister for the third time and for a sixth mandate in his own right. Paul Bérenger was reappointed as leader of the opposition on 13 December.

The seventh National Assembly was convened on 22 December and oversaw the swearing-in of all members of the assembly. Defeated incumbent Militant Socialist Movement MP Maya Hanoomanjee, the former health minister who resigned after the MedPoint affair, was elected as speaker, becoming the first female holder of the office. In addition, Adrien Duval of the Parti Mauricien Social Démocrate was elected as deputy speaker, and became the youngest elected member of the assembly at 24.
