= Plateforme Militante (Mauritius) =

Political party in Mauritius

Militant Platform Plateforme Militante
- Abbreviation: PM
- Leader: Steven Obeegadoo
- Founder: Steven Obeegadoo
- Founded: (2018)
- Split from: MMM
- Ideology: Participative democracy Social democracy
- Political position: Centre-left
- National affiliation: Alliance Lepep
- National Assembly: 0 / 66

The Militant Platform (French: Plateforme Militante) is a political party in Mauritius founded in 2018. The party is led by Steven Obeegadoo.

== Coalition of MSM-ML-Plateforme Militante ==
The party formed a coalition with Militant Socialist Movement and the Muvman Liberater for the 2019 general elections of Mauritius where it secured 1 seat in the National Assembly during its first participation.

== 2024 general elections ==
The party remained with the MSM under the Alliance Lepep coalition but lost the elections.

== Election results ==
=== Legislative elections ===
Election	Leader	Coalition	Votes	%	Seats	+/–	Position	Status
2019	Steven Obeegadoo	PM–MSM–MAG–ML	21,556	1.01	1 / 70	New	▲8th	Coalition
2024	Steven Obeegadoo	PM–MSM–PMSD–MPM–ML	12,470	0.53	0 / 66	▼1	▼16th	No seats
