= Subhasnee =

Mauritian politician

The Honorable Subhasnee Luchmun Roy सुभासनी लुचमुन रॉय MP
- In office 2019–2023
- President: Prithvirajsing Roopun
- Prime Minister: Pravind Jugnauth
- Vice President: Eddy Boissezon

Member of Parliament for constituency No.4

Personal details
- Born: Mauritius
- Party: Militant Socialist Movement
- Occupation: Politician, radio personality

Subhasnee Luchmun Roy, popularly known as Rj Subhasnee, is a politician and former radio personality, serving as member of parliament. She has previously worked at the Mauritius Broadcasting Corporation. She was elected in constituency No.4 Port-Louis North-Montagne Longue during the Mauritian general elections of 2019 under the L'Alliance Morisien coalition which comprises political parties such as Militant Socialist Movement, Muvman Liberater and Plateforme Militante (Mauritius).
