= Sanjeev Teeluckdharry =

Mauritian politician and diplomat

Kalidass Teeluckdharry

Leader of Congrès Citoyen Mauricien (CCM)
- Incumbent
- Assumed office 12 November 2025

Avengers (founding member)
- Incumbent
- Assumed office 6 February 2021

Deputy Speaker of the National Assembly
- In office 27 January 2017 – 27 July 2018
- Prime Minister: Pravind Jugnauth
- Speaker: Maya Hanoomanjee

Member of Parliament for No.5 Pamplemousses–Triolet
- In office 15 December 2014 – 7 November 2019

Personal details
- Born: 5 October 1976 (age 49) Mauritius
- Party: Militant Socialist Movement; Congrès Citoyen Mauricien (CCM)
- Spouse: Namrata Gaya Teeluckdharry

Kalidass Teeluckdharry, commonly known as Sanjeev Teeluckdharry, is a Mauritian lawyer and politician.

== Early life and legal career ==
Teeluckdharry was born in the coastal village of Grand Baie. He attended Grand Bay Primary School before attending public secondary schools in Goodlands, Terre Rouge and Port Louis. He then studied Law at the University of Mauritius. He then completed the Bar Vocation Course for Council organised by the Supreme Court. He came out in first place at Criminal Laws Paper and was also awarded the Fernand Boulan Memorial Cup 2000 prize.

He spent 3 months of his pupillage at the office of André Robert Jr before going under Désiré Basset's supervision. He was called to the Bar in November 1999 before taking the oath in 2001. He started a legal practice with Désiré Basset and Nadraj Patten, specialising in Criminal Law, the Constitution and Civil Law. At the start of his career he was the defence lawyer for a minister's son involved in manslaughter while driving. He also defended politician Dev Hurnam in the Grand Bois State Bank hold-up scandal, as well as another case involving Antoine Chetty's allegations against Dev Hurnam. After the Michaela McAreavey's murder in 2011 he represented one of the suspects, Avinash Treebhoowoon, who worked at the Legends hotel, and who was later cleared of Mrs McAreavey's killing by a Supreme Court jury.

When he was 38 years old in 2014, Sanjeev Teeluckdharry married Namrata Gaya, an attorney-at-law in her thirties and niece of Kobita Jugnauth. In 2018 her full-time appointment at the National Preventive Mechanism Division (NPMD) of the Human Rights Commission by the MSM government, to replace Anishta Babooram who was sacked after raising concerns about the death-in-custody of police constable Arvind Hurreechurn, was seen as a consolation, designed to prevent her husband from triggering a by-election, had he resigned from the National Assembly after stepping down as Deputy Speaker. She later represented Mauritius as a beauty pageant for the Mrs. World 2026 contest in Las Vegas in January 2026.

== Political career ==
At the 2014 General Elections he stood as a candidate of the Militant Socialist Movement (MSM) within the Alliance Lepep coalition in Constituency No.5 Pamplemousses–Triolet and was elected in third position behind Soodesh Callichurn and Sarvanand Ramkaun, defeating Navin Ramgoolam in this northern constituency.

In January 2017 he was nominated as Deputy Speaker of the National Assembly. But he had to resign at the end of July 2018 after the publication of former Puisne Judge Paul Lam Shang Leen's report on the Commission of Enquiry on Drug Trafficking. He completed his term as a back-bencher.

In February 2021 he was one of the founding members of a new legal collective called "The Avengers" which would fight against social injustice, corruption, racism and abuse of power.

In November 2025 he launched a new political party called Congrès Citoyen Mauricien (CCM).
