= Eddy Boissézon =

Mauritian politician (1952–2025)

Eddy Boissézon GOSK
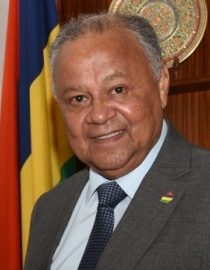
- Boissézon in 2023

Vice-President of Mauritius
- In office 2 December 2019 – 7 December 2024
- President: Prithvirajsing Roopun
- Prime Minister: Pravind Jugnauth; Navin Ramgoolam
- Preceded by: Barlen Vyapoory
- Succeeded by: Robert Hungley

Minister of Civil Service and Administrative Reforms
- In office 23 January 2017 – 12 November 2019
- Prime Minister: Pravind Jugnauth
- Preceded by: Ashit Gungah
- Succeeded by: Vikram Hurdoyal (Public Service, Administrative and Institutional Reforms)
Parliamentary offices
Member of Parliament; for La Cavèrne and Phoenix
In office 11 December 2014 – 6 October 2019
Preceded by	Rihun Hawoldar
Succeeded by	Gilbert Bablee
Member of Parliament; for Mahébourg and Plaine Magnien
In office 21 December 1995 – 11 August 2000
Preceded by	Ivan Collendavelloo
Succeeded by	Soudesh Roopun

Personal details
- Born: 28 March 1952 British Mauritius
- Died: 1 November 2025 (aged 73) Mauritius
- Party: Muvman Liberater (from 2014); Mauritian Militant Movement (until 2014)
- Spouse: Connie Boissézon

Marie Cyril Edouard "Eddy" Boissézon GOSK (28 March 1952 – 1 November 2025) was a Mauritian politician who served as vice-president of Mauritius from 2019 to 2024.

Initially a member of the Mauritian Militant Movement, Boissézon joined Muvman Liberater in 2014. He was elected as a member of the National Assembly from 1995 to 2000, and again from 2014 to 2019. Boissézon was appointed Minister of Civil Service and Administrative Reforms in January 2017 and served until November 2019 under Pravind Jugnauth's first government.

== Early life and career ==
Boissézon was born on 28 March 1952 and attended secondary school at Saint Joseph's College in Curepipe. He would go on to serve the same institution by becoming a teacher in accountancy.

Afterwards, Boissézon worked at Barclays as a bank office and later as a purchasing and supply manager at Scott & Co. Ltd. He was also executive director at ATICS & Co. Ltd.

== Political career ==
Boissézon started his political career by becoming a municipal councillor of Vacoas-Phoenix in 1991 and served as its Deputy Mayor from 1991 to 1993. He contested as a candidate for the National Assembly for the first time in 1995 under the constituency of Mahébourg and Plaine Magnien. Boissézon ran under the banner of PTr–MMM, under the Mauritian Militant Movement.

Boissézon won the election after the alliance won all mainland constituencies of Mauritius, resulting in the second 60–0 victory in the country's electoral history. During his time as an MP, he would represent Mauritius in the ACP–EU Joint Parliamentary Assembly in both years of 1996 and 1997.

In 2014, along with Ivan Collendavelloo and others, he would defect from the Mauritian Militant Movement and join Muvman Liberater (ML). He was elected as secretary-general of the party.

Boissézon became a candidate for ML in the general election held in December 2014. His party had formed an alliance with the Militant Socialist Movement under the Alliance Lepep. Boissézon ran under the constituency of La Caverne and Phoenix and would go on to win the constituency, along with his running mates Tulsiraj Benydin from the ML and Showkutally Soodhun from the Militant Socialist Movement.

Following the alliance's victory in the election, Boissézon was appointed Parliamentary Private Secretary under Anerood Jugnauth's government which he would serve until Jugnauth's resignation in January 2017. He would receive his first ministerial appointment under Pravind Jugnauth's first government in that same month becoming Minister of Civil Service and Administrative Reforms.

He ran for re-election in 2019 under the constituency of Curepipe and Midlands for the Alliance Morisien, however he failed to get elected for the constituency.

Boissézon was proposed as the alliance's candidate for vice-president of Mauritius on 2 December 2014 and was duly elected unopposed to the position along with Prithvirajsing Roopun, who was elected as president of the Republic.

== Personal life and death ==
Boissézon was married to Connie Boissézon and had three children. He was a keen player of football, volleyball and track and field.

After a long illness, Boissézon died on 1 November 2025, at the age of 73.

== Awards and decorations ==
Boissézon received the title Grand Officer of the Order of the Star and Key of the Indian Ocean (GOSK) in March 2019. The Chinatown Foundation awarded him the Visionary Award 2022 for his continual support for cultural initiatives.

- Mauritius
  - Grand Officer of the Order of the Star and Key of the Indian Ocean (2019)
