= Uteem =

Uteem is a surname. Notable people with the surname include:

- Cassam Uteem (born 1941), Mauritian political figure
- Muhammad Uteem (born 1971), Mauritian politician
