= Lalit (Mauritius) =

Mauritian political party

Struggle Lalit
- Founded: 1981
- Split from: Mauritian Militant Movement
- Headquarters: 153 Main Road, Grand River North West
- Ideology: Socialism; Marxism; Environmentalism; Anti-capitalism; Internationalism; Feminism
- Political position: Left-wing

Website
- http://www.lalitmauritius.org/

Lalit (lit. 'Struggle') is a left-wing political party in the Republic of Mauritius. It is opposed to private or any other undemocratic control of government functions. According to its website, the party was created as a "free-expression monthly magazine" named "Lalit de Klas" (English: "Class Struggle") in 1976. "Lalit" means "struggle" in Mauritian Creole. The party, which started as a tendency inside the Mauritian Militant Movement, split from it in 1981, when the MMM announced that it was embarking on a policy of "New Social Consensus", seen by Lalit as a policy of collaboration with the capital.

Lalit desires what it calls "an alternative political economy", and works towards care for the environment, against repression and torture, and towards women's liberation. Lalit strongly opposes communalism and the use of ethnoreligious labels for official purposes. Its candidates in the 2005 National Assembly elections each drew the legally compulsory classification he or she would use from a hat, regardless of candidate's actual supposed "ethnicity" or religion. The party failed to win seats in the Assembly.

The party opposes the presence of Anglo-American forces on the atoll of Diego Garcia which forms part of the Republic of Mauritius.

== Election results ==
=== National Assembly elections ===
Election	Votes	%	Seats	+/–	Position	Status
1983	3,116	0.23	0 / 70	0	5th	Extra-parliamentary
1987	8,723	0.52	0 / 70	0	▼6th	Extra-parliamentary
1991	—					
1995	—					
2000	14,960	0.81	0 / 70	0	▼7th	Extra-parliamentary
2005	13,726	0.70	0 / 70	0	7th	Extra-parliamentary
2010	—					
2014	11,550	0.57	0 / 70	0	7th	Extra-parliamentary
2019	4,119	0.19	0 / 66	0	▼14th	Extra-parliamentary
2024	773	0.03	0 / 66	0	▲12th	Extra-parliamentary
