= Fazila Jeewa-Daureeawoo =

Mauritian politician (born 1959)

Fazila Jeewa-Daureeawoo GCSK
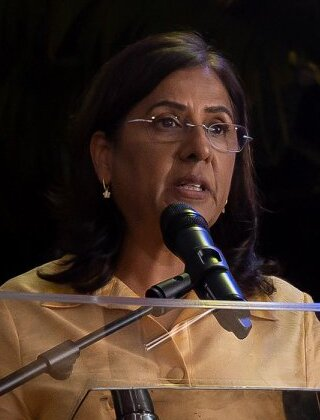
- Jeewa-Daureeawoo in 2019

Vice-Prime Minister of Mauritius
- In office 16 November 2017 – 12 November 2019
- Prime Minister: Pravind Jugnauth
- Preceded by: Showkutally Soodhun
- Succeeded by: Anwar Husnoo
Ministerial offices
Minister of Social Integration, Social Security and National Solidarity Social Security, National Solidarity and Reform Institutions (2014–2016)
In office 12 November 2019 – 12 November 2024
Prime Minister	Pravind Jugnauth
Preceded by	Alain Wong (Social Integration); Étienne Sinatambou (Social Security and National Solidarity)
Succeeded by	Ashok Subron
In office 15 December 2014 – 23 January 2017
Prime Minister	Anerood Jugnauth
Preceded by	Sheila Bappoo
Succeeded by	Étienne Sinatambou (Social Security and National Solidarity)
Minister of Gender Equality, Child Development and Family Welfare
In office 27 July 2018 – 12 November 2019
Preceded by	Roubina Jadoo-Jaunbocus
Succeeded by	Kalpana Koonjoo-Shah
In office 19 December 2016 – 16 November 2017
Prime Minister	Anerood Jugnauth; Pravind Jugnauth
Preceded by	Aurore Perraud
Succeeded by	Roubina Jadoo-Jaunbocus
Minister of Local Government and Outer Islands
In office 16 November 2017 – 12 November 2019
Preceded by	Mahen Jhugroo
Succeeded by	Anwar Husnoo (Local Government); Pravind Jugnauth (Outer Islands)

Member of Parliament; for Stanley and Rose Hill
- In office 12 December 2014 – 6 October 2024
- Preceded by: Nicole Ribot
- Succeeded by: None
- In office 5 July 2005 – 31 March 2010
- Preceded by: Feroz Abdoola
- Succeeded by: Nicole Ribot

Personal details
- Born: 27 January 1959 (age 67)
- Party: Militant Socialist Movement

Fazila Jeewa-Daureeawoo GCSK (born 27 January 1959) is a Mauritian politician who has served in various ministerial positions as a member of the Militant Socialist Movement. She represents Constituency No. 19 in the National Assembly. She is the first woman to hold the position of Vice Prime Minister.

== Legal career ==
Jeewa-Daureeawoo worked as a solicitor and has appeared in the Supreme Court of Mauritius and its Family Division.

== Political career ==
Jeewa-Daureeawoo was first elected to the National Assembly in the 2005 general election, and held her seat until 2010. She was elected again in the 2014 general election, and was appointed Minister of Social Security, National Solidarity and Reform Institutions until January 2017.

She was then appointed Minister of Gender Equality, Child Development and Family Welfare until November 2017. She then held the honorary title of Vice Prime Minister until November 2019, while also serving as Minister of Local Government and Outer Islands. In July 2018, she became Minister of Gender Equality, Child Development and Family Welfare again after an inquiry accused lawyer and incumbent-minister Roubina Jadoo-Jaunbocus of meeting with jailed drug traffickers who were not her clients.

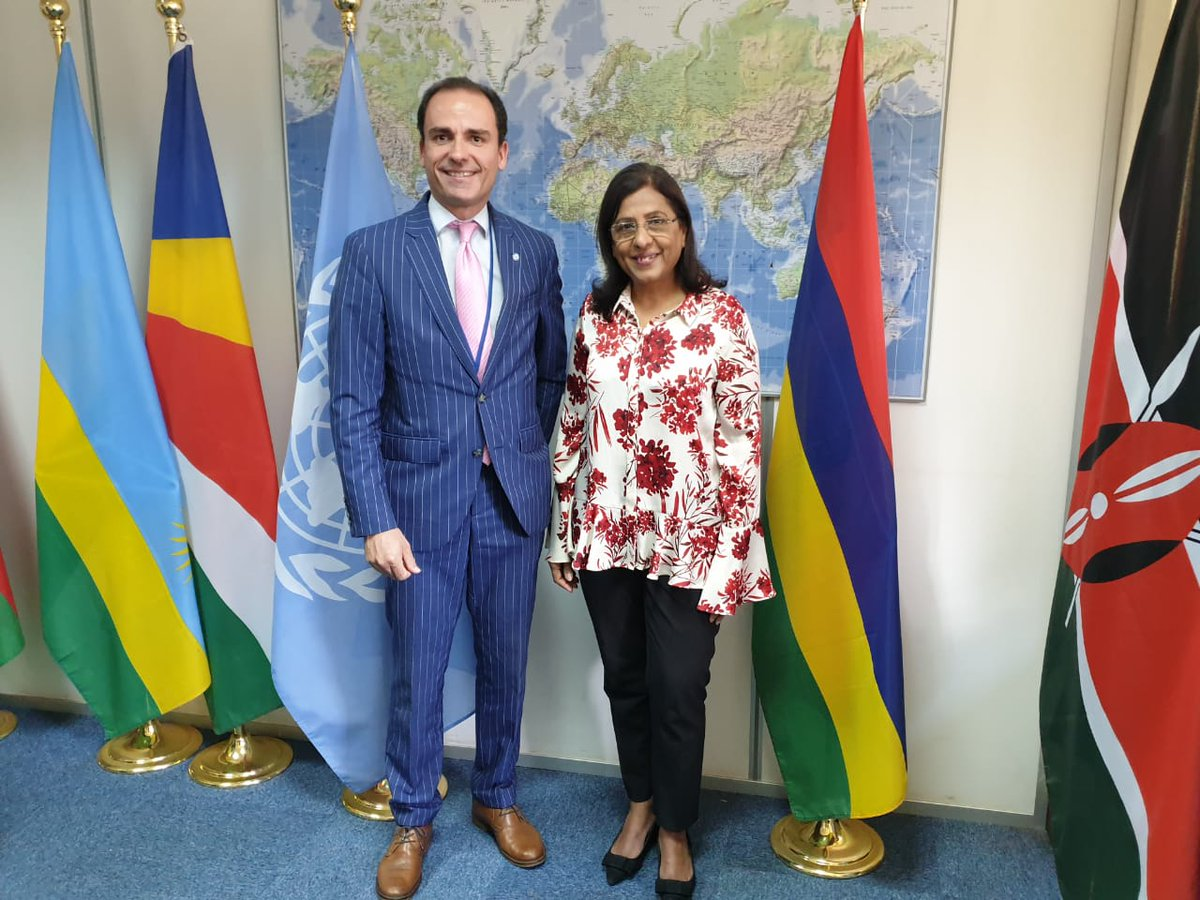
Mrs Fazila Jeewa-Daureeawoo meeting the UNODC Regional Representative for Eastern Africa.

Following the 2019 general election, she was again appointed to the Ministry of Social Security and National Solidarity as the Minister of Social Integration, Social Security and National Solidarity.
