= Minister of Defence and Home Affairs (Mauritius) =

Government minister of Mauritius

Minister of Defence, Home Affairs and External Communications of Mauritius
- Ministre de la Défense, de l'Intérieur et des Communications extérieurs
- Coat of arms of Mauritius

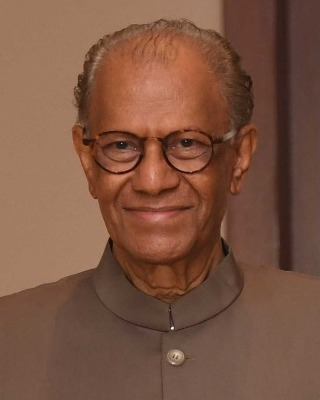
- Incumbent; Navin Ramgoolam since 22 November 2024
- Style: The Honourable
- Nominator: Prime Minister of Mauritius
- Appointer: President of Mauritius
- Term length: At the president's pleasure
- Inaugural holder: Seewoosagur Ramgoolam
- Formation: 12 March 1968; 58 years ago
- Website: dha.govmu.org

The Minister of Defence, Home Affairs and External Communications is a position in the Cabinet of Mauritius which heads the Ministry of Defence, Home Affairs and External Communications. Usually held by the prime minister, all of its holders since its inception have been prime ministers at the same time.

Accordingly, the current holder is the incumbent prime minister, Navin Ramgoolam, having held the office since November 2024.

== History ==
Following the independence of Mauritius in 1968, Sir Seewoosagur Ramgoolam became prime minister, after previously being known as premier. Under his terms, Ramgoolam held the portfolio of defence and internal security. He also invariably at times in his premiership also held other portfolios whilst being prime minister. His successor, Anerood Jugnauth, also kept the two portfolios together albeit with other portfolios combined with it (Reform Institutions and Interior).

The portfolio of Home Affairs did not start to receive its current name until 1996, when it was previously known as Internal Security from its inception in 1968. Following a reshuffle in November 1996, Navin Ramgoolam became minister of Defence and Home Affairs with the title of Internal Security being retired thereafter. Successive premiers after him, the elder Jugnauth and Paul Bérenger, kept the portfolios as it was.

In 2017, following the resignation of Sir Anerood Jugnauth as prime minister, the portfolios of Defence and Home Affairs were separated for the first time in its history. The elder Jugnauth kept his portfolio as defence minister whilst his son and successor, Pravind Jugnauth, took over the portfolio of home affairs whilst combining it with the portfolios of External Communications and the National Development Unit.

After the victory of Pravind's Alliance Morisien in the elections held in 2019, he recombined the portfolios of defence and home affairs whilst also keeping the portfolio of external communications under the same ministry. His successor, Navin Ramgoolam, kept the same portfolios after his election in 2024.

== List of ministers ==
This list only takes into account persons who have held the portfolios of Defence and Home Affairs (previously known under the title of Internal Security).

Portrait	Name	Term of office			Portfolio name	Party	Prime minister	Ref.
Portrait	Name	Took office	Left office	Time in office	Portfolio name	Party	Prime minister	Ref.
	Sir Seewoosagur Ramgoolam	12 March 1968	15 June 1982	14 years, 95 days	Defence and Internal Security	PTr	S. Ramgoolam	
	Sir Anerood Jugnauth	15 June 1982	15 August 1988	13 years, 190 days	Defence and Internal Security	MMM	A. Jugnauth	
	Sir Anerood Jugnauth	15 June 1982	15 August 1988	13 years, 190 days	Defence and Internal Security	MSM	A. Jugnauth	
	Sir Anerood Jugnauth	15 August 1988	24 September 1990	13 years, 190 days	Defence and Internal Security; the Interior	MSM	A. Jugnauth	
	Sir Anerood Jugnauth	January; 1990	22 December 1995	13 years, 190 days		MSM	A. Jugnauth	
	Navin Ramgoolam	30 December 1995	30 November 1996	4 years, 260 days	Defence and Internal Security	PTr	N. Ramgoolam	
	Navin Ramgoolam	30 November 1996	15 September 2000	4 years, 260 days	Defence and Home Affairs	PTr	N. Ramgoolam	
	Sir Anerood Jugnauth	18 September 2000	30 September 2003	3 years, 12 days	Defence and Home Affairs	MSM	A. Jugnauth	
	Paul Bérenger	30 September 2003	5 July 2005	1 year, 278 days	Defence and Home Affairs	MMM	Bérenger	
	Navin Ramgoolam	7 July 2005	11 May 2010	9 years, 159 days	Defence and Home Affairs	PTr	N. Ramgoolam	
	Navin Ramgoolam	11 May 2010	13 December 2014	9 years, 159 days	Defence, Home Affairs and External Communications	PTr	N. Ramgoolam	
	Sir Anerood Jugnauth	15 December 2014	23 January 2017	2 years, 39 days	Defence and Home Affairs	MSM	A. Jugnauth	
	Sir Anerood Jugnauth	23 January 2017	12 November 2019	2 years, 293 days	Defence	MSM	P. Jugnauth	
	Pravind Jugnauth	23 January 2017	12 November 2019	2 years, 293 days	Home Affairs, External Communications and National Development Unit	MSM	P. Jugnauth	
	Pravind Jugnauth	12 November 2019	12 November 2024	5 years	Defence, Home Affairs and External Communications	MSM	P. Jugnauth	
	Navin Ramgoolam	22 November 2024	Incumbent	1 year, 289 days	Defence, Home Affairs and External Communications	PTr	N. Ramgoolam	

== See also ==
- Prime Minister of Mauritius
- Government of Mauritius
