= Sooroojdev Phokeer =

Mauritian politician and ambassador

Sooroojdev Phokeer GCSK
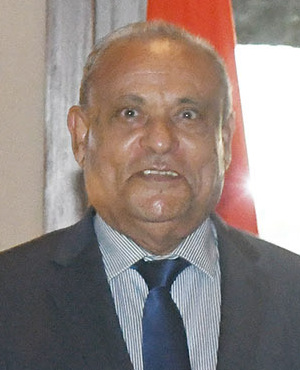
- Phokeer in 2024

Speaker of the National Assembly
- In office 21 November 2019 – 16 July 2024
- Prime Minister: Pravind Jugnauth
- Deputy: Zahid Nazurally
- Preceded by: Maya Hanoomanjee
- Succeeded by: Adrien Duval

Mauritian High Commissioner to Canada
- In office 2014–2019
- Prime Minister: Sir Anerood Jugnauth

Mauritian Ambassador to USA
- In office 2015–2019
- Prime Minister: Sir Anerood Jugnauth

Mauritian Ambassador to Egypt
- In office 2001–2004
- President: Sir Anerood Jugnauth
- Prime Minister: Paul Berenger

Member of Parliament for Constituency No.14 Black River
- In office 1991–1995
- Prime Minister: Sir Anerood Jugnauth

Chairman of Black River District Council
- In office 1991–1992
- Prime Minister: Sir Anerood Jugnauth

Personal details
- Born: 3 January 1951 (age 75) British Mauritius
- Party: Militant Socialist Movement
- Occupation: Schoolteacher

Sooroojdev Phokeer is a politician, former Ambassador, and former schoolteacher from Mauritius, who was also Speaker of the National Assembly of Mauritius. He has served as Ambassador to the United States from 2015 to 2019 and Ambassador to Egypt from 2001 to 2004.

== Early life ==
Phokeer was born in 1951. He grew up in a family of nine children and his father was a civil servant at the Ministry of Works. He received his secondary education at Bhujoharry College in Port Louis, and he later worked at the same school as a teacher of economics. But he was one of the 34 teachers who were sacked from Bhujoharry College for setting up a teachers' union in the mid-1970s.

== Political career ==
In 1983 Phokeer joined the MSM. Eight years later he was elected in Constituency No.14 to the Legislative Assembly in 1991. In 1991 he was also elected as Chairman of the Black River District Council.

When the MSM returned to government as part of the MSM/MMM coalition in 2000 Phokeer was appointed as ambassador in Egypt. After 4 years as ambassador then Prime Minister Paul Bérenger sacked Phokeer over serious misconduct in Egypt. However, Bérenger appointed Phokeer as an adviser within his government soon after Phokeer's repatriation to Mauritius in 2004. At the 2005 general elections the MSM was defeated and this prompted Phokeer to travel to England to study law at the University of Huddersfield. Afterwards Phokeer occasionally assisted Anerood Jugnauth as MSM's Campaign Manager during electroal campaigns.

Soon after its return to government following the 2014 general elections the MSM appointed Phokeer as ambassador of Mauritius in the United States of America.

After the 2019 General Elections Phokeer replaced Maya Hanoomanjee as Speaker of the National Assembly, after actively supporting the MSM's campaign in Constituency No. 8 Moka-Quartier Militaire and Constituency No.10.

He resigned from the Speakership only 4 months before the Nomination Day for the 2024 General Elections was announced, and Adrien Duval, who had not secured a parliamentary seat at the 2019 General Elections, was nominated as Phokeer's caretaker replacement by the MSM-PMSD-ML government in which his father Xavier-Luc Duval wielded a strong influence.

== Controversies ==
=== 2004 Misconduct and recall from Egypt ===
Phokeer was nominated as Ambassador to Egypt by the MSM-MMM government in 2000. However, a diplomatic scandal broke out in Egypt as he was blamed for misconduct, so much so that the new Prime Minister Paul Bérenger had to sack Phokeer and recall him back to Mauritius. The MSM government then appointed him as Special Advisor at the Ministry of Agriculture. The local press reported the lack of transparency about the exact details of Phokeer's misconduct.

=== 2018 USA Dreadlocks scandal ===
After spending 4 years as ambassador in the USA, Phokeer made news headlines in 2018 due to office conflicts arising with Giovanni Merle, another Mauritian employee. Merle was eventually soon fired from the Mauritian Embassy after he refused to follow Phokeer's directives to cut off his deadlocks.

== Awards and decorations ==
Phokeer received the title Grand Officer of the Order of the Star and Key of the Indian Ocean (GOSK) in 2016 for his "contribution to the development of the country". He was elevated to the rank of Grand Commander of the Order of the Star and Key of the Indian Ocean (GCSK) in 2021 for his "contribution in the public service and in the political and social fields".

- Mauritius
  - Grand Officer of the Order of the Star and Key of the Indian Ocean (2016)
  - Grand Commander of the Order of the Star and Key of the Indian Ocean (2021)
