= Sandra Mayotte =

Mauritian politician

The Honorable Sandra Mayotte MP
- In office 2019–2023
- President: Prithvirajsing Roopun
- Prime Minister: Pravind Jugnauth
- Vice President: Eddy Boissezon

Personal details
- Born: Mauritius
- Party: Militant Socialist Movement
- Occupation: Politician, singer, television presenter

Sandra Mayotte is a Mauritian politician in the National Assembly of Mauritius, a former television presenter and a renowned séga artist.

== Biography ==
Sandra Mayotte lives in Quatre Bornes.

In the 1990s she became a presenter for the Mauritius Broadcasting Corporation. A very popular singer in the Indian Ocean region, she often occupies the music scene of Mauritius and elsewhere. She was a Choriste within the group Cassiya in 1998, which is how she made her beginnings as a singer. Winner of the Kora Award in 2001 as best artist of East Africa, she has been pursuing her career for 30 plus years now. In January 2018 she was chosen to present the Mauritian version of the show Who Wants to Be a Millionaire?.

== Song Charts ==
- Kayambo
- Makalapo
- Mo Kontan Twa
- Kot Li Finn Ale
- La Limier Dan Lakaz
- Vinn danse ar moi Doumanawi

== Awards and recognition ==
  - Kora Awards, catégorie Meilleure artiste féminine d'Afrique de l'Est en 2001
  - Disque de l'année pour Kot sa li fine alé en 2008
  - Disque de l'année avec Désiré François pour Voisin Voisine
  - Disque de l'année pour Kayambo

== See also ==
- Mauritian culture
