= Ravi Yerrigadoo =

Mauritian politician

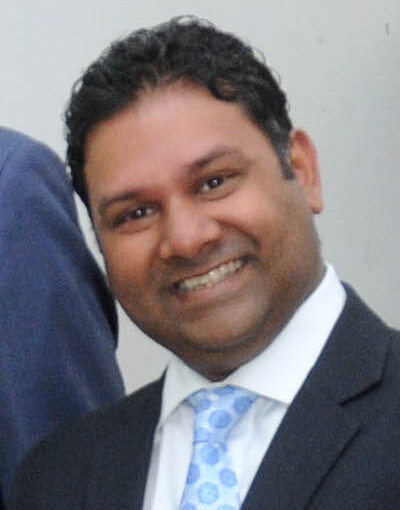
- Yerrigadoo in 2015

Attorney-General of Mauritius
- In office 15 December 2014 – 13 September 2017
- Prime Minister: Anerood Jugnauth; Pravind Jugnauth
- Preceded by: Jim Seetaram
- Succeeded by: Maneesh Gobin

Minister of Youth and Sports
- In office 17 September 2000 – 5 July 2005
- Prime Minister: Anerood Jugnauth; Paul Bérenger
- Preceded by: Marie Claude Arouff-Parfait
- Succeeded by: Sylvio Tang

Personal details
- Born: Ravi Raj Yerrigadoo; 1974 (age 51–52) Mauritius
- Party: Militant Socialist Movement
- Spouse: Hema
- Profession: Lawyer

Ravi Raj Yerrigadoo (born c. 1974) is a Mauritian politician.

Yerrigadoo is of Hindu descent. He was elected to the National Assembly in 2000 via the Best Loser System. Aged 26 at the time, Yerrigadoo was also named minister of Youth and Sports. He ran in the 2005 Mauritian local election.

Yerrigadoo joined the Alliance Lepep coalition prior to the 2014 Mauritian general election, and was appointed to lead the Ministry of Justice in December 2014. Yerrigadoo resigned from the position on 13 September 2017, after allegations of money laundering were made by Husein Abdool Rahim. Rahim later withdrew the allegations against Yerrigadoo.

He is married to Hema.
