= Barlen Vyapoory =

Mauritian politician

His Excellency Barlen Vyapoory GOSK
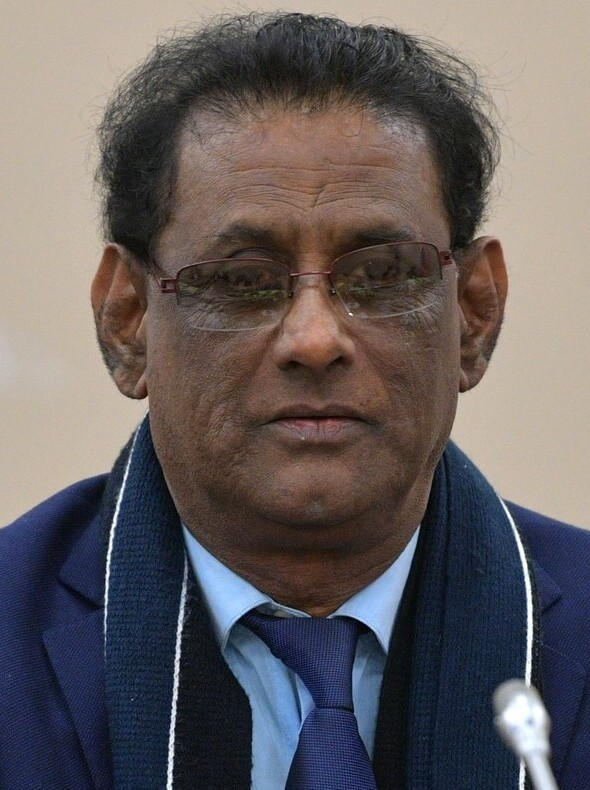
- Paramasivum Vyapoory in 2019

Acting President of Mauritius
- In office 23 March 2018 – 26 November 2019
- Prime Minister: Pravind Jugnauth
- Preceded by: Ameenah Gurib
- Succeeded by: Eddy Balancy (acting)

5th Vice President of Mauritius
- In office 29 March 2016 – 26 November 2019
- President: Ameenah Gurib
- Preceded by: Monique Ohsan Bellepeau
- Succeeded by: Eddy Boissézon

Personal details
- Born: Paramasivum Pillay Vyapoory; 1945 or 1946 (age 80–81) Mauritius Island, Mauritius
- Party: Militant Socialist Movement
- Spouse: Sarojini
- Children: Anjali
- Occupation: Politician; diplomat

Paramasivum Pillay "Barlen" Vyapoory (born 1945/46) is a Mauritian politician and diplomat who served as the fifth vice president of Mauritius from April 2016 to November 2019.

== Early life ==
Barlen Vyapoory previously served as High Commissioner of the Republic of Mauritius to South Africa. Vyapoory has served as president of that organization on several occasions. He is a member of the Militant Socialist Movement.

After Ameenah Gurib stepped down, he served as the acting president of Mauritius until his resignation on 26 November 2019.

== Awards and decorations ==
- Mauritius:
  - Grand Officer of the Most Distinguished Order of the Star and Key of the Indian Ocean
