= Dorine Chukowry =

Mauritian politician

The Honourable Marie Christiane Dorine Chukowry MP

Lord Mayor of Port Louis
- In office 2013–2014

Member of Parliament PPS
- In office 12 November 2019 – 30 August 2023
- President: Pradeep Roopun
- Prime Minister: Pravind Jugnauth

Minister of Commerce and Consumer Protection
- Incumbent
- Assumed office 30 August 2023
- President: Pradeep Roopun
- Prime Minister: Pravind Jugnauth

Personal details
- Born: 1972 Port Louis
- Party: MMM; MSM

Marie Christiane Dorine Chukowry, commonly known as Dorine Chukowry, (born 1972) is a Mauritian politician.

== Early life and career ==
Chukowry was born in Port Louis. She received her primary school education at Loretto Convent of Port Louis, before starting her secondary school education at London College, which she subsequently left in order to complete her secondary school education at St Batholomew College. She graduated with a Higher School Certificate in 1992 from the latter.

She then worked at the same St Batholomew College as a clerk, where she was later promoted to School Principal.

Whilst working Chukowry also studied accounting, graduating with a Bachelor of Education (B.Ed.. She then undertook postgraduate studies in Counselling (Master of Arts in Counselling) and in educational administration and technology (Master of Science), followed by a Doctor of Philosophy (Ph.D.).

== Political career ==
Dorine Chukowry's interest in politics started when her husband joined the MMM in the 1990s. By 2007 she had also joined the MMM via the Women's Wing. In 2009 she was elected by the party members, securing the seat of Treasurer.

She served as Councillor at the Municipality of Port Louis following her election in 2012. Dorine Chukowry then became Deputy Lord Mayor, and on 20 December 2013 she was elected as Lord Mayor of Port Louis as a candidate of the MSM-MMM coalition, thus becoming the first female Lord Mayor of the capital city of Mauritius.

In 2018 Dorine Chukowry resigned from the MMM and joined the MSM after waging lengthy and bitter skirmishes with MMM politicians Veda Baloomoody and Arianne Navarre-Marie.

At the 2019 General Elections she stood as a candidate of the MSM at Constituency No.1 Port Louis West-GRNW and was elected, serving as Parliamentary Private Secretary (PPS) of the MSM-ML coalition government led by Pravind Jugnauth. In August 2023 Dorine Chukowry replaced Soodesh Callichurn as Minister of Commerce and Consumer Protection. Since 2019 Callichurn held this ministry as an interim measure.
