= Muvman Liberater =

Mauritian political party

Liberator Movement Muvman Liberater
- Leader: Ivan Collendavelloo
- Founder: Ivan Collendavelloo
- Founded: April 2014
- Split from: MMM
- Ideology: Democratic socialism
- Political position: Left-wing
- National affiliation: Alliance Lepep
- Colours: Fuchsia
- National Assembly: 0 / 66

The Muvman Liberater (French: Mouvement Libérateur, lit. 'Liberator Movement') is a left-wing political party in Mauritius that was founded in 2014 by Ivan Collendavelloo, a lawyer and career politician. It was created as a breakaway from the Mauritian Militant Movement (MMM) in protest against MMM leader Paul Berenger's alliance with Prime Minister Navin Ramgoolam's Labour Party. It won seven seats in the 2014 General Election, with the elected MPs being Ivan Collendavelloo, Sangeet Fowdar, Anil Gayan, Ravi Rutna, Anwar Husnoo, Eddy Boissezon and Toolsyraj Benydin.

Muvman Liberater (ML) forms part of the Alliance Morisyen which was re-elected into office at the November 2019 general elections. The alliance (Alliance Morisyen) also includes the Mouvement Militant Mauricien (MSM), Mouvement Alan Ganoo (MAG) and Plateforme Militante (PM).

Collendavelloo has stated his intention to reunify the MMM.

== Election results ==
=== Legislative elections ===
Election	Leader	Coalition	Votes	%	Seats	+/–	Position	Status
2014	Ivan Collendavelloo	ML–MSM–PMSD	120,579	5.91	6 / 69	New	▲4th	Coalition
2019	Ivan Collendavelloo	ML–MSM–MAG–PM	68,058	3.19	3 / 70	▼3	▼5th	Coalition
2024	Ivan Collendavelloo	ML–MSM–PMSD–MPM–PM	35,963	1.53	0 / 66	▼2	▼8th	No seats
