= Reza Uteem =

Mauritian politician (born 1971)

Muhammad Reza Cassam Uteem (Urdu: رضا عطیم; born 1 December 1971) is a Mauritian politician who is commonly known as Reza Uteem. He is currently the Minister of Labour and Industrial Relations.

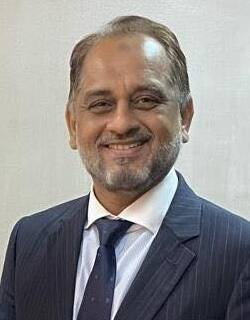
Uteem in 2024

== Early life and education ==
Reza Uteem is the son of past President of Mauritius Cassam Uteem. He was educated at the University of Buckingham (LLB) and King's College London where he graduated with an LLM in International Business Law and was a Chevening Scholar. He was called to the Bar in England and in Mauritius and is the founder and head of Uteem Chambers.

== Political career ==
Reza Uteem started playing an active role in politics after the death of his 38-year-old brother Oomar in 2007. He served as Second Member for Constituency No.2 Port Louis South & Port Louis Central in the National Assembly since 6 May 2010. He was returned as First Member for the same constituency on 11 December 2014. He is the President of Mouvement Militant Mauricien (MMM).
