= Yogida Sawmynaden =

Mauritian politician

The Honourable Yogida Sawmynaden MP
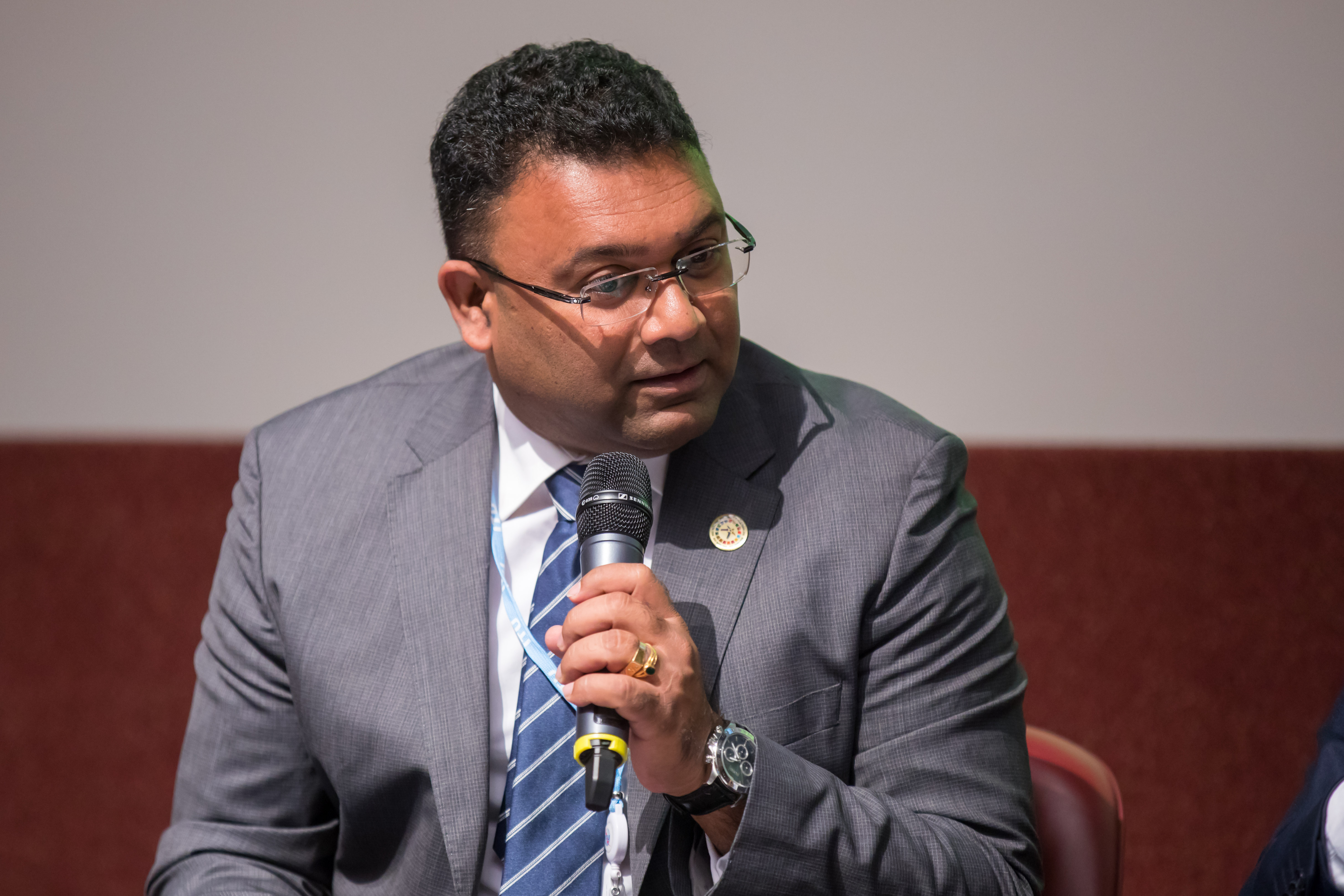

Minister of Commerce
- In office 12 November 2019 – 10 February 2021
- President: Pradeep Roopun
- Prime Minister: Pravind Jugnauth

Minister of Technology
- In office 24 January 2017 – 11 November 2019
- President: Ameenah Fakim
- Prime Minister: Pravind Jugnauth

Minister of Youth and Sports
- In office 15 December 2014 – 23 January 2017
- President: Ameenah Fakim
- Prime Minister: Anerood Jugnauth

Personal details
- Born: 1974 (age 51–52) Belle Rose, Quatre Bornes, Mauritius
- Party: MMM (1999-2005); MSM (2006-now)

Yogida Sawmynaden (born 1974) is a Mauritian politician.

== Early life and education ==
Yogida Sawmynaden was born in a Tamil Hindu family in Mauritius. After attending primary school Beau Séjours in Belle Rose he attended secondary school Collège du St Esprit in Quatre Bornes. He then travelled to England where he studied accounting, law and business administration. He later went to France to complete higher studies in international management.

== Political career ==
Yogida's political career started in 1999 as the vice president of the youth wing of the MMM. In 2001 he became councillor of the Municipality of Beau Bassin-Rose Hill and in 2003 he was appointed Deputy Mayor of the same locality. Following the 2005 electoral defeat of the MSM-MMM alliance (led by Paul Bérenger), Sawmynaden left the MMM and became an activist of Jugnauth's MSM.

In December 2014 he was MSM's candidate within Alliance Lepep coalition in Constituency No.8 Moka-Quartier Militaire. He was elected behind his running mates Leela Dookun and Pravind Jugnauth.

At the 07 November 2019 general elections Yogida Sawmynaden stood as candidate of the MSM within the L'Alliance Morisien. He was elected as 3rd Member for Constituency No.8 Moka Quartier Militaire in the National Assembly, behind Pravind Jugnauth and Leela Dookun. On 12 November 2019 he was appointed Minister of Commerce.

During the afternoon of 10 February 2021 Yogida Sawmynaden announced his resignation from his position as Minister of Commerce after having been interrogated by police regarding the fictitious employment of Simla Kistnen. He was succeeded by his colleague Soodesh Satkam Callichurn.

== Scandals ==
=== 2012 arrest for photographing Prime Minister's mistress Soornack ===
Yogida Sawmynaden was arrested by police for using his mobile phone to take photos of Navin Ramgoolam's mistress Nandanee Soornack on 10 December 2012 within the compounds of Dr. Maurice Curé State College during a political campaign for a by-election in Vacoas-Phoenix. Sawmynaden was there as an active member of the MSM, where as Soornack was a senior "agent" of the Labour Party. The Director of Public Prosecutions dismissed the case within a few months, but his arbitrary arrest figured in the US Department of State annual Country Report on Human Rights Practices.

=== 2014 Bribery scandal Mauritius Sports Council (activist Khudurun) ===
Although he was not the lowest bidder, MSM political activist Nawshad Khudurun was awarded a contract by the Mauritius Sports Council (MSC) to produce a marketing clip to promote the upcoming National Sports Awards Night (January 2016). At that time Yogida Sawmynaden had direct control over the MSC as the Minister of Youth and Sports and Khudurun had campaigned for Yogida Samnynaden in Constituency (No.8) at the 2014 general elections. However Khudurun complained that a senior civil servant from the MSC had requested a bribe of Rs 15,000 in order be able to receive the Rs 176,000 that were owed to him under the terms of the contract. The PRO of the Ministry of Youth & Sports gave him a cheque of Rs 18,000. A voice recording of Yogida Sawmynaden was also presented to ICAC showing that the ex-minister was offering Khudurun an additional Rs 18,000 in cash.

=== 2017 botched contracts for Ramalingum's DCL (school tablets and internet) ===
In February 2017 Yogida Sawmynaden, minister of Technology, awarded a new major contract private firm Data Communications Limited (DCL) to connect 160 schools to the internet, despite the fact that in 2015 the minister of Education (Leela Devi Dookun-Luchoomun) had to cancel DCL's contract for the supply of electronic tablets to primary schools. DCL's director Ganesh Ramalingum had already received a deposit of Rs 21.7 millions, but failed to supply a single tablet to any school. DCL's director Ganesh Ramalingum requested advance payment of Rs 45 Millions via the State Law Office before going into receivership without making any internet connection.

=== 2020 murder of activist Kistnen and fictitious employment ===
Yogida Sawminaden is subject to a prosecution regarding the murder of MSM-activist Soopramanien Kistnen, whose body was found in a sugar cane field on 18 October 2020. Kistnen was a political activist and self-employed contractor within Constituency No.8 Quartier Militaire and Moka and was about to contact the ICAC to reveal corrupt practices in the allocation of government contracts for public works and the supply of goods. Although police investigators of the Major Crimes Investigation Team (MCIT) had received a Judge's Order to obtain a DNA sample from Yogida Sawmynaden, the latter refused to provide it in August 2021. At the same time other suspects who refused to provide their DNA samples included Deepak Bonomally and Vinay Appanah. Deepak Bonomally is the director of Bo Digital Co. Ltd, a firm which had received large government contracts. Vinay Appanah is the director of several companies which had also been granted large contracts from Mauritius Telecom, National Transport Corporation and government departments, and is also the brother-in-law of STC's general manager Jonathan Ramasamy. In February 2021 accountant Ashwin Poonyth revealed how he had injected large amounts of money into new company NeeteeSelec, created by Yogida's girlfriend and air hostess Neeta Nuckched. Soon afterwards Nuckched's firm was awarded large government contracts for decontamination via the State Trading Corporation (STC).

A private prosecution was also lodged in December 2020 against Yogida Sawminaden by the wife of the murdered victim, for falsely declaring that he is employing her as constituency clerk.

=== 2021 Unexplained wealth and cash payment for brand new Porsche ===
Barrister Rama Valayden lodged an official request for ICAC to investigate Yogida Sawmynaden under article 84 of the Prevention of Corruption Act for unexplained wealth after the latter had made cash payment of Rs 3.2 Million for a brand new Porsche Macan in May 2021. Valayden suspects that such a large amount of cash is linked to suspicious transactions which had been revealed at the Moka District Court involving State Trading Corporation's contracts.
