= Steven Obeegadoo =

Mauritian politician

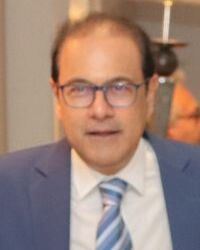

Louis Steven Obeegadoo is a politician from Mauritius who served as Deputy Prime Minister of Mauritius. He also served as Minister of Housing and Land Use Planning, and as Minister of Tourism.

Obeegadoo also served as temporary Chairman of UNESCO during 2006 to 2008, and as Education Minister.

== Personal life ==
Obeegadoo is married. He has a B.Sc. in economics and a M.Sc. in politics from the London School of Economics & Political Science, and a postgraduate diploma in law from The City University, London.
