= Anwar Husnoo =

Mauritian political figure

Mohammad Anwar Husnoo is a politician from Mauritius who is serving as Vice Prime Minister of Mauritius. He also served as Minister of Local Government and Disaster Risk Management.

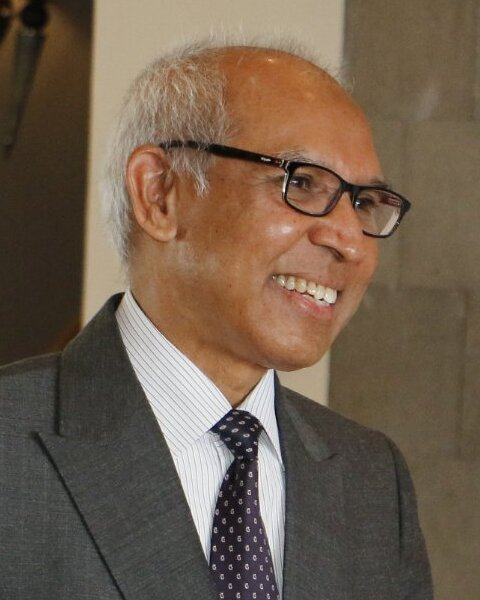
Husnoo in 2022

Husnoo was born on 28 August 1951. He was a member of Labour Party.
