= Showkutally Soodhun =

Mauritian politician (born 1951)

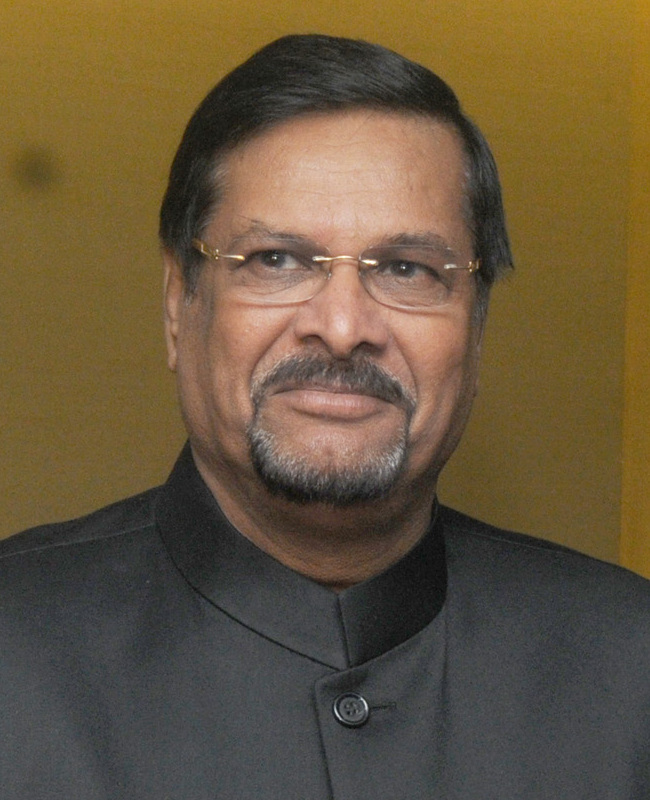
Soodhun in 2015

Showkutally Soodhun (born 1951) is a politician from Mauritius who served as Vice Prime Minister of Mauritius from 17 December 2014 to 16 November 2017 and Minister of Housing and Lands. He was elected as a member of the National Assembly in 2005.
