= Ivan Collendavelloo =

Mauritian politician

Ivan Collendavelloo (born in 1950) is a politician from Mauritius who served as Deputy Prime Minister of Mauritius and Vice Prime Minister of Mauritius. He also served as Minister of Energy & Public Utilities. In July 2020, Prime Minister of Mauritius replaced Collendavelloo from his offices because he was involved in corrupt practices.

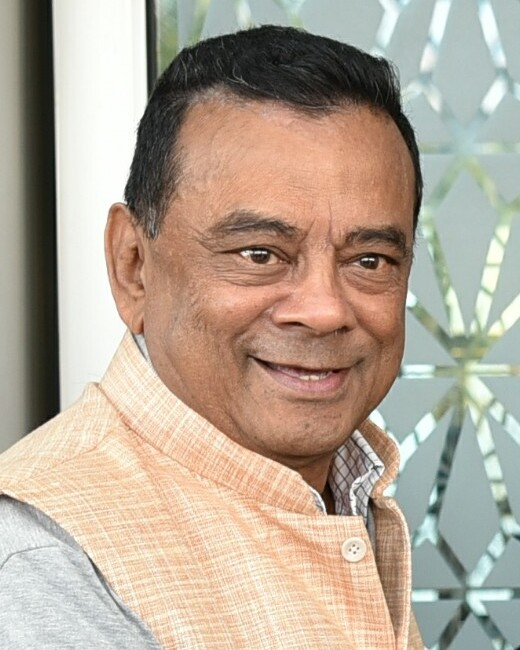
Collendavelloo in 2018
