= 2025 Mauritian municipal elections =

- 4 May 2025

Municipal elections were held in Mauritius on 4 May 2025 to determine the composition of the municipal councils of the city of Port Louis and the towns of Beau Bassin-Rose Hill, Curepipe, Quatre Bornes, and Vacoas-Phoenix. Initially planned for 2021, Prime Minister Pravind Jugnauth's government delayed the elections that year and again in 2022 due to the COVID-19 pandemic. The government postponed the elections for a third time in 2023, sparking criticism from the opposition. The previous elections were held in 2015, which resulted in Alliance Lepep sweeping all councils. The Militant Socialist Movement (MSM) and Parti Mauricien Social Démocrate (PMSD), both part of Alliance Lepep, declined to contest the municipal polls, instead choosing to rebuild support after the alliance's landslide defeat at the 2024 general election.

Prime Minister Navin Ramgoolam's Alliance du Changement, which comprised the Labour Party, the Mauritian Militant Movement (MMM), the New Democrats, and Rezistans ek Alternativ, won the elections in a landslide. The alliance won all seats on the Curepipe and Quatre Bornes councils and won all except one in Port Louis, Beau Bassin-Rose Hill, and Vacoas-Phoenix. The Reform Party, En Avant Moris and an independent each secured one seat. Voter turnout was low at only 26%, down from 35% in 2015.

== Background ==
At the previous municipal elections, held on 14 June 2015, then-Prime Minister Anerood Jugnauth's Alliance Lepep won every single seat on all municipal councils. The alliance comprised the MSM, the PMSD and Muvman Liberater (ML). The elections saw a voter turnout of just 35%, a decrease from 44% in 2012. The municipal polls followed Alliance Lepep's landslide victory in the 2014 parliamentary election, which ousted Prime Minister Navin Ramgoolam's government. The Labour Party, led by Ramgoolam, declined to contest the 2015 elections, which he claimed would not be free and fair. Ramgoolam also alleged that voters were fearful of repercussions for supporting his party. The MMM, then the largest opposition party in the National Assembly, contested the municipal polls but suffered from internal divisions, with some members expressing dissatisfaction with long-serving Party Leader Paul Bérenger's refusal to step down after the MMM's 2014 defeat.

Originally expected to be held in 2021, the MSM-led government postponed the elections that year and again in 2022 due to the COVID-19 pandemic while extending the council term. In 2023, the government delayed the elections for a third time to 2025, with Prime Minister Pravind Jugnauth citing a need for local government reforms. The opposition denounced the postponements as "cowardice". Opposition Parliamentary Whip Patrice Armance questioned the reasoning for the first two postponements, as Rodrigues held elections during the pandemic. MMM MP Deven Nagalingum claimed the MSM's fear of defeat was behind the delay.

== Electoral system ==
Elections for municipal councils are conducted via the plurality bloc voting system and comprise wards that each return four councillors. The Municipal City Council of Port Louis has 32 members representing eight wards. The municipal town councils of Vacoas-Phoenix and Beau Bassin-Rose Hill have 24 members elected from six wards, while the Quatre Bornes and Curepipe councils have 20 members and five wards. The president of Mauritius, on the advice of the prime minister, sets the dates of the municipal elections. Eligible candidates must be at least 18 years old and residents of the municipality they run in. Voters were also required to be at least 18 years old to register. Amendments to the Representation of the People Act allowed individuals who had reached voting age or would turn 18 by the nomination day to enrol through the electoral commission's supplementary register, the Quasi Live Register. A total of 400,887 individuals were registered to vote in the elections; Port Louis had the largest share with 114,354 voters, followed by 88,587 in Vacoas-Phoenix and 77,546 in Beau Bassin-Rose Hill. Quatre Bornes had 64,488 electors, while Curepipe had the least with 59,912. Unlike in previous elections, ballots were counted on polling day immediately after voting ended. Unless the president dissolves the municipal councils early or approves the extension of the council term, councillors serve a six-year term. After the elections, the councils elect a mayor and deputy mayor.

== Groups and candidates ==
Alliances and groups that field more than two candidates are required to ensure that two-thirds of their contestant lineup is not of the same gender. Three Alliance Lepep member parties, the MSM, the PMSD, and Muvman Patriot Morisien, declined to contest the municipal polls. Instead, the parties focused on rebuilding support after the alliance was swept from power at the 2024 general election, which it lost in a landslide to Ramgoolam's Alliance du Changement.

Initially, 407 candidates registered to contest the elections, 65% of whom were men, while women comprised 34%. Three candidates later withdrew; two were independents, and one was a VréML member. The elections saw 22 groups field candidates, including two alliances. Prime Minister Ramgoolam's Alliance du Changement comprised the Labour Party, the MMM, the New Democrats and Rezistans ek Alternativ. The alliance fielded 120 candidates, the most of all contesting blocs. The Labour Party, the MMM, and Rezistants ek Alternativ contested all five councils, while the New Democrats only ran candidates in Curepipe and Vacoas-Phoenix. The Linion Moris Alliance was led into the election by Didier Michel and comprised Les Verts Fraternels, Linion Pep Morisien and Rassemblement Mauricien. The alliance's candidate lineup in Port Louis' Ward 5 and Curepipe's Ward 3 failed to meet the gender quota. As a result, Electoral Commissioner Irfan Abdool Rahman announced that the Linion Moris contestants in these wards would instead run as independents. The Reform Party, led by Roshi Bhadain, fielded 81 candidates and was the only bloc other than Alliance du Changement to compete in all five municipalities.

Alliance	Member groups	Alliance leader
Alliance du Changement	Labour Party	Navin Ramgoolam
Alliance du Changement	Mauritian Militant Movement	Navin Ramgoolam
Alliance du Changement	New Democrats	Navin Ramgoolam
Alliance du Changement	Rezistans ek Alternativ	Navin Ramgoolam
Linion Moris	Les Verts Fraternels	Didier Michel
Linion Moris	Linion Pep Morisien	Didier Michel
Linion Moris	Rassemblement Mauricien	Didier Michel

== Campaign ==
Many blocs reportedly lacked a public presence during the campaign, dampening voter enthusiasm. Although Alliance du Changement organised a rally in Beau Bassin-Rose Hill for Labour Day, many other blocs did not host large-scale gatherings, instead utilising lower-scale campaign methods. Citing a lack of resources to host a rally, Anil Gayan's VréML focused on door-to-door canvassing. The Vacoas-Phoenix-based Castel Scouts group pledged to provide bus shelters for local communities and continue its work on combatting the drug epidemic. En Avant Moris, led by Patrick Belcourt, also campaigned on fighting the drug crisis and only ran candidates in Beau Bassin-Rose Hill. The bloc advocated installing solar panels on all municipal buildings and called for the introduction of programs offering further opportunities to the town's artists and athletes. The Reform Party campaigned on providing an alternative to counter-balance the Alliance du Changement-dominated National Assembly. Concerned with a potential low voter turnout, Prime Minister Ramgoolam urged the electorate to cast a ballot and not take the elections for granted. Political observer Bernard Saminaden believed the polls would witness a low voter turnout, which he suggested was due to many voters perceiving fewer issues at stake than in the 2024 general election.

== Conduct ==
President Dharam Gokhool dissolved the municipal councils on 17 March and issued the writ for the elections two days later. The nomination day for contestants to register their candidacies occurred on 5 April, while candidates had until 8 April to withdraw if they intended to do so. Voter registration commenced on 20 March and concluded on 24 March. On election day, polling stations were open from 7:00 to 17:00. A voter in Beau Bassin-Rose Hill was taken to a police station for questioning after photographing a candidate casting a ballot at a polling station. The voter, who was related to the candidate, wished to use the photo to encourage others to vote. A polling official had declined the voter's request to photograph the candidate and said such an action was prohibited. An investigation into the incident was launched.

== Results ==
Alliance du Changement won landslide victories in all councils, winning 117 out of an overall 120 seats. The alliance secured all seats on the Curepipe and Quatre Bornes councils and only lost one in Beau Bassin-Rose Hill, Port Louis and Vacoas-Phoenix. En Avant Moris and the Reform Party each won a single seat, as did one independent. The elections witnessed an overall low voter turnout at only 26%, a nine point decrease from the 35% in 2015.

=== Port Louis ===
In Port Louis, Alliance du Changement won 31 of the 32 council seats. One independent, Ajay Teerbhoobhan, secured a seat and received the most votes in Ward 8. Despite having the largest electorate, with 114,354 individuals registered to vote, Port Louis recorded the lowest voter turnout of all municipalities at only 21%.

Group or alliance		Votes	%	Seats
Alliance du Changement	Labour Party	25,716	28.94	15
Alliance du Changement	Mauritian Militant Movement	25,687	28.91	14
Alliance du Changement	Rezistans ek Alternativ	3,242	3.65	2
Alliance du Changement	Total	54,645	61.50	31
Reform Party		15,217	17.12	0
Linion Moris	Les Verts Fraternels	1,528	1.72	0
Linion Moris	Rassemblement Mauricien	784	0.88	0
Linion Moris	Linion Pep Morisien	739	0.83	0
Linion Moris	Total	3,051	3.43	0
Muvman Liberater		831	0.94	0
Mauritian Solidarity Front		812	0.91	0
Repiblik Sitwayen Popiler		219	0.25	0
Independents		14,084	15.85	1
Total		88,859	100.00	32
Valid votes		88,859	99.83	
Invalid/blank votes		155	0.17	
Total votes		24,524	–	
Registered voters/turnout		114,354	21.45	
Source: OEC, OEC (turnout)

On 14 May, the Port Louis councillors were sworn in. The council elected Aslam Hosenally of the MMM as lord mayor and the Labour Party's Giovanni Hensley as deputy lord mayor. Hosenally previously served as lord mayor from 2012 to 2013.

=== Beau Bassin-Rose Hill ===
In Beau Bassin-Rose Hill, Alliance du Changement won 23 of the 24 council seats. En Avant Moris secured one seat, which was won by its leader, Patrick Belcourt, who received the most votes in Ward 2. Although only 29.8% of the electorate voted, Beau Bassin-Rose Hill had the highest voter participation rate among all municipalities, which was slightly higher than in Vacoas-Phoenix.

Group or alliance		Votes	%	Seats
Alliance du Changement	Mauritian Militant Movement	26,141	29.35	14
Alliance du Changement	Labour Party	13,283	14.91	7
Alliance du Changement	Rezistans ek Alternativ	3,439	3.86	2
Alliance du Changement	Total	42,863	48.12	23
Reform Party		21,418	24.05	0
En Avant Moris		17,131	19.23	1
Muvman Liberater		2,635	2.96	0
VréML		1,998	2.24	0
Linion Moris	Les Verts Fraternels	1,314	1.48	0
Linion Moris	Linion Pep Morisien	471	0.53	0
Linion Moris	Total	1,785	2.00	0
Independents		1,241	1.39	0
Total		89,071	100.00	24
Valid votes		89,071	99.88	
Invalid/blank votes		106	0.12	
Total votes		23,129	–	
Registered voters/turnout		77,546	29.83	
Source: OEC, OEC (turnout)

On 15 May, the Beau Bassin-Rose Hill councillors were sworn in. The council elected Gabriella Batour of the MMM as mayor and Gina Poonoosamy of Rezistans ek Alternativ as deputy mayor. Batour and Poonoosamy's election marked the first time a municipality in Mauritius simultaneously had a female mayor and deputy mayor.

=== Curepipe ===
In Curepipe, Alliance du Changement won all 20 council seats. Curepipe had the smallest electorate of all municipalities, with 59,912 registered voters. Voter turnout was just 26%, with 15,604 individuals casting a ballot.

Group or alliance		Votes	%	Seats
Alliance du Changement	Mauritian Militant Movement	13,740	23.37	8
Alliance du Changement	Labour Party	13,107	22.29	8
Alliance du Changement	New Democrats	5,260	8.95	3
Alliance du Changement	Rezistans ek Alternativ	1,829	3.11	1
Alliance du Changement	Total	33,936	57.72	20
Reform Party		11,982	20.38	0
Idéal Démocrate		4,643	7.90	0
Independents		8,232	14.00	0
Total		58,793	100.00	20
Valid votes		58,793	99.85	
Invalid/blank votes		87	0.15	
Total votes		15,604	–	
Registered voters/turnout		59,912	26.04	
Source: OEC, OEC (turnout)

On 15 May, the Curepipe councillors were sworn in. The council elected Dhaneshwar Bissonauth of the Labour Party as mayor and Marie Diana Ami of the New Democrats as deputy mayor.

=== Quatre Bornes ===
In Quatre Bornes, Alliance du Changement won all 20 council seats. Voter turnout was only 27%, with 16,335 of the 60,488 registered voters participating in the election.

Group or alliance		Votes	%	Seats
Alliance du Changement	Labour Party	19,266	31.27	11
Alliance du Changement	Mauritian Militant Movement	14,322	23.24	8
Alliance du Changement	Rezistans ek Alternativ	1,575	2.56	1
Alliance du Changement	Total	35,163	57.07	20
Repiblik Sitwayen Popiler		10,619	17.23	0
Reform Party		10,019	16.26	0
Mouvement Mauricien Citoyen Inclusif		1,700	2.76	0
Muvman Liberater		824	1.34	0
Linion Pep Morisien		323	0.52	0
Independents		2,968	4.82	0
Total		61,616	100.00	20
Valid votes		61,616	99.95	
Invalid/blank votes		31	0.05	
Total votes		16,335	–	
Registered voters/turnout		60,488	27.01	
Source: OEC, OEC (turnout)

On 14 May, the Quartre Bornes councillors were sworn in. The council elected Labour Party members Ruddy Bryan Kennoo as mayor and Jameel Foondun as deputy mayor.

=== Vacoas-Phoenix ===
In Vacoas-Phoenix, Alliance du Changement won 23 of the 24 council seats. In Ward 3, former Mayor Ashwin Dookun of the Reform Party was tied with Alliance du Changement's Bhageeruth Mdhin for fourth place, with both candidates receiving 1,930 votes. In accordance with the Local Government Act, a returning officer drew lots to break the tie, which awarded the seat to Dookun, giving the Reform Party its sole victory. Vacoas-Phoenix had the second-highest voter turnout at 29%, slightly lower than in Beau Bassin-Rose Hill.

Group or alliance		Votes	%	Seats
Alliance du Changement	Labour Party	31,596	33.35	13
Alliance du Changement	Mauritian Militant Movement	17,426	18.39	7
Alliance du Changement	New Democrats	4,138	4.37	2
Alliance du Changement	Rezistans ek Alternativ	2,109	2.23	1
Alliance du Changement	Total	55,269	58.33	23
Reform Party		22,873	24.14	1
Muvman Liberater		2,983	3.15	0
Castel Scouts		2,394	2.53	0
Repiblik Sitwayen Popiler		157	0.17	0
Independents		11,075	11.69	0
Total		94,751	100.00	24
Valid votes		94,751	99.87	
Invalid/blank votes		124	0.13	
Total votes		25,723	–	
Registered voters/turnout		88,587	29.04	
Source: OEC, OEC (turnout)

On 15 May, the Vacoas-Phoenix councillors were sworn in. The council elected Sunjeevsing Dindyal of the Labour Party as mayor and the MMM's Sadaseven Sooben as deputy mayor.

After the election, Mdhin submitted an electoral petition to the Supreme Court, requesting a recount and challenging Dookun's election in Ward 3. Mdhin claimed that after the votes were counted and produced a tie, he requested the returning officer conduct an immediate recount, which she refused. The officer then drew lots, which Mdhin said should have only occurred if the recount resulted in another tie. He also alleged the officer mispronounced his name during the count and mistook him for another candidate, which he suggested may have comprised the vote tallying. Dookun maintained that the draw was warranted and dismissed the petition as a "bad faith political manoeuvre".

== Aftermath ==
The elections saw a voter abstention rate of 73%, a drastic change from the 2024 general election, in which 79% of the electorate voted. Many analysts, including political observer Jocelyn Chan Low, characterised the low turnout as a silent protest by the electorate against policies of centralisation that have left local governments with few powers. Low noted that, as a result, many citizens saw little point in voting and called for local government reform. Numerous citizens also reportedly declined to vote, citing dissatisfaction with the Alliance du Changement government. Constitutional expert Parvez Dookhy stated that the withdrawal of the opposition heavyweights MSM and PMSD made the elections uncompetitive, further depressing turnout. Former mayor of Curepipe, Amédée Darga, claimed Alliance du Changement's 2024 victory also led many voters to conclude that the bloc's 2025 win was inevitable.

Prime Minister Ramgoolam hailed the results as a "great victory" for Alliance du Changement despite the turnout. He further stated that the alliance's 2024 parliamentary triumph did not mean that the bloc's municipal landslide win was a foregone conclusion; he mentioned that the MMM-led alliance's 1982 parliamentary landslide did not result in the bloc attaining a clean sweep in the municipal elections that year, which saw a lower turnout. Reform Party leader, Roshi Bhadain, said he was proud of his party's performance and highlighted how the party received over 1,000 votes in most wards. However, he expressed concern about the lack of opposition representation on the councils.
