= Rishon Bhadain =

Mauritian politician

Personal details
- Born: August 17, 1998 (age 27) United Kingdom
- Party: Reform Party (present)
- Height: 6ft 1 I in
- Parent: Roshi Bhadain
- Occupation: Politician
- Website: www.reformparty.mu

Rishon Bhadain (born 17 August 1998) is a British-born Mauritian politician affiliated with the Reform Party (Mauritius). He gained prominence in local politics through his involvement in the 2020 village council elections in Albion.

== Early life ==
Rishon Bhadain was born on 17 August 1998 in United Kingdom. He is the son of Roshi Bhadain, the leader of the Reform Party (Mauritius), a political party in Mauritius. Raised in the town of Albion, Rishon has lived in the area for over two decades, which has greatly influenced his community involvement and political aspirations.

== Political career ==
Rishon Bhadain began his political career at the age of 22, following in the footsteps of his father, Roshi Bhadain. In 2020, he contested the village council elections in Albion under the banner of "Reform Nou Villaz," a local movement aligned with the principles of the Reform Party (Mauritius). His campaign focused on local reform and development, emphasizing community engagement and improving relationships between the village council and residents.

Rishon’s group succeeded in winning three seats on the Albion Village Council during the 2020 elections. This victory allowed him to play a significant role in local governance, contributing to discussions on village leadership and potentially influencing decisions at the district level.
