= MPA =

MPA or mPa may refer to:

== Academia ==
=== Academic degrees ===
- Master of Performing Arts
- Master of Professional Accountancy
- Master of Public Administration
- Master of Public Affairs

=== Schools ===
- Mesa Preparatory Academy
- Morgan Park Academy
- Mounds Park Academy
- Mount Pisgah Academy

== Science and medicine ==
- Megapascal, SI unit of pressure
- Marine protected area
- MeerKAT Precursor Array for the MeerKAT radio telescope in South Africa
- Microscopic polyangiitis, a disease
- Minor physical anomalies
- Movement pattern analysis, for assessing motivations

=== Chemicals ===
- Medroxyprogesterone acetate
- 3-Mercaptopropionic acid
- Methiopropamine, (N-methyl-1-(thiophen-2-yl)propan-2-amine)
- Methylphosphonic acid
- Mycophenolic acid, an immunosuppressant drug
- 4-Nonanoylmorpholine or morpholide pelargonic acid

== Legislation ==
- Marriage Protection Act, 2003–2004 US federal bill

== Organizations and companies ==
- Macedonian Press Agency, Greece
- Maine Principals' Association, governing school sports, Maine, US
- Manipur People's Army, India
- Manufacturing Perfumers' Association, the original name of the Personal Care Products Council from 1894 to 1922
- Max Planck Institute for Astrophysics, near Munich, Germany
- Medical Products Agency (Sweden)
- Metropolitan Police Authority, London, UK (2000–2012)
- Mineral Products Association, UK
- Motion Picture Alliance, US political organization
- Motion Picture Association, US trade association
- Movement for the Autonomies, Sicily, Italy
- MPA – the Association of Magazine Media, US
- Music Publishers Association, US
- Music Publishers Association (UK)

== Transportation ==
- Katima Mulilo Airport, Namibia; IATA airport code
- Maritime patrol aircraft
- Maritime and Port Authority of Singapore
- Maryland and Pennsylvania Railroad, US
- Maryland Port Administration, US
- Mauritius Ports Authority
- Massachusetts Port Authority, US
- Mid Pacific Airlines, a defunct US airline; ICAO airline code
- Mooroopna railway station, Australia
- Mount Pleasant Airport, Falkland Islands
- Myanma Port Authority, Myanmar

== Other uses ==
- Mario Party Advance, a 2005 Game Boy Advance video game
- Member of the Provincial Assembly, Pakistan
- MPA submachine gun

== See also ==
- MPAS (disambiguation)
