= Eddy J. Changkye =

Eddy J. Changkye (2 February 1924 – 31 October 1994) was a Mauritian diplomat, politician, Member of the National Assembly of Mauritius, municipal councillor, mayor, jurist, writer and poet. He was a distinguished member of the Mauritius Labour Party and served as ambassador to Paris. He was an attorney-at-law by profession and he also won recognition for his literary works.

== Political career ==
Eddy Changkye was elected member of the Municipal Council for the city of Port Louis in 1953 and was re-elected at the next municipal election in 1959. He became Deputy Mayor of Port Louis in 1959 and Mayor of the city between 1959 and 1960. He also ran as Labour Party candidate for Constituency No. 3 – Port Louis South in the country's General Election held on 9 March 1959 and was elected member of the Legislative Assembly with a majority of the votes. Consequently, he was appointed the position of Deputy Chief Whip of the Government – under the leadership of Sir Seewoosagur Ramgoolam – that same year until 1963. In 1963, Eddy Changkye resigned from parliament and as municipal councillor to take the post of Town Clerk of Quatre-Bornes. He held the position until July 1982 when his departure was required by the new government of the opposing party MMM.

Thereafter, Eddy Changkye opened his law firm at rue Georges Guibert, Port Louis and returned to politics. He took active part in the General Elections of 1983 and 1987. He was chairman of the board of the Mauritius Housing Company as a political appointee.

On 4 September 1988, Eddy Changkye was elected General Secretary of the Labour Party (Mauritius) succeeding Anil Baichoo. And on 26 December 1989, the then Prime Minister, Anerood Jugnauth confirmed the nomination of Eddy Changkye as ambassador extraordinary and plenipotentiary to Paris – upon recommendation of Satcam Boolell, the then President and Leader of the Labour Party – to replace Mrs. Ghislaine Henry. Eddy Changkye held the position of ambassador to Paris until 1992.

After his return from Paris, Eddy Changkye returned to his legal profession and moved to his office at Chancery House, Port-Louis until his death on 31 October 1994.

== Literary work ==
Eddy Changkye was President of la Société des écrivains mauriciens d'expression francaise. His poem featured in Les Cahiers de la Mer Indienne (1959), with Edouard Maunick, Pierre Renaud et Regis Franchette. In 1983, he started working on a document on le Copyright ou le Droit d'Auteur published in the same year. Although the subject of the book was scholarly, it was made accessible to the layman with the statement of principles underlying copyright law and the review of our laws.

His children's tale, La Princesse, Karapas et le Pieter Both was published in Carambole, a magazine specifically directed towards the Asian diaspora French, distributed mainly in Mauritius but also in Pondicherry, Seychelles, Kenya, Madagascar, and Trinidad and Tobago. Carambole was a huge success with young people in Mauritius who recognised the comic series, stories and games published.

His tale Chamarel ou la terre arc-en-ciel was published in L'Express, 14 March 1993.

== Acclaim ==
Eddy Changkye's tale Le Masque (1978) was selected and broadcast by Radio France Internationale in Paris. In 1979, he was awarded the "Prix Loys Masson" by l'Association des écrivains for L'Homme a la Bequille d'or. In 1980, he won the "Prix de la MBC" for the humoristic tale L'Extravagant Monsieur Jojo, published as part of Les Six meilleures nouvelles (1980). In 1990, he was awarded a Jasmin d’argent (Palmares Francophone) by the notable literary society for his poem Clapotis d’eau.

He is the author the unpublished memoir Sir Seewoosagur Ramgoolam, conseiller municipal which was distributed internally among the Mauritius Labour Party in April 1988.

== Achievements ==
Eddy Changkye brought an immense contribution to the Municipality of Quatre-Bornes Simon de Beauvoir Library project which was a donation of the French government through the Commission Mixte Franco-Mauricienne. As Secretary of the Municipality, he introduced the Committee System for the proper conduct of municipal affairs. In 1968, his involvement in municipal administrative responsibilities helped him compile key changes to Standing Orders of the Municipal Council.

Eddy Changkye was the President of the Fire Brigade Football Club from 1956 to 1966 and President of the Tamil Cadets Football Club Committee (now known as Sunrise Flaq United) from 1976 to 1977. He was the Mauritius representative of Northern Institute of Massage of Blackpool, England and formed part of the medical and para-medical commission during the Jeux des Iles de l'Ocean Indien in 1985 responsible for the team of qualified massage therapists. He was the coach of the Municipality of Quatre-Bornes Football Club throughout his career at the municipality.

Eddy Changkye was the first President of l'Association des Authorités Urbaines (AUA).

== See also ==
- List of mayors of Port Louis
