= MPAS =

The acronym MPAS may refer to:

- Magazine Publisher's Association of Singapore
- Maritime and Port Authority of Singapore
- Master of Physician Assistant Studies
- Ministry of Public Administration and Security (South Korea)
- Model for Prediction Across Scales, a coupled Earth system model consisting of atmospheric, oceanographic, cryospheric, and land surface components
- Mornington Peninsula Astronomical Society
- Methenamine Periodic Acid Schiff Stain, or Jones' stain

== See also ==
- MPA (disambiguation)
