= List of mayors of Port Louis =

The following is a list of Lord mayors of the city of Port Louis on the island of Mauritius. The island was under French rule until 1810, when the British took power. Mauritius became independent in 1968.

- Thomas Enouf, 1790
- François Fressanges, 1791
- Louis Ricard de Bignicourt, 1791
- Louis Etienne Gilbert Grison de Marneville, 1792
- Henri Marie Salaün de Kerbalanec, 1793
- Pierre François Douaud, 1794
- Pierre François Marie Fabre, 1794
- Pierre Couturont (1795-1797)
- Claude Antoine Chauvet, 1798
- Auguste Journel, 1799
- Sylvain Roux (1800-1803)
- Louis Léchelle, 1850-1853
- Sir Gabriel Froppier, 1854-1855
- Louis Léchelle, 1856
- Emile Pipon, 1856
- Hippolyte Lemière, 1857
- Arthur Edwards, 1858
- Pierre Nelsir Charon, 1859, 1865
- G. de Courson, 1860-1862
- Hippolyte Lemière, 1863-1864
- Pierre Nelsir Charon, 1865
- Charles Pitot, 1866-1867
- Eliaçin Francois, 1868-1869
- Emilien Ducray, 1870-1872
- Eliaçin Francois, 1873-1875
- G.F. Poulin, 1875-1876
- L. Hily, 1877
- Emile Lanougarède Bazire, 1878-1881
- Alfred Lavoquer, 1882-1883
- G.E. Thomy Pitot, 1884
- Alfred Lavoquer, 1885-1886
- G.V. K/Vern, 1887-1889
- Edgar Aubert, 1889-1892
- E. Duponsel, 1892
- L. François, 1893-1895
- C.E. Thomy Pitot, 1897-1900
- Eugène Laurent, 1905-1919 (1905, 1907-1909, 1911-1912, 1917-1919)
- Louis Victor Ducasse 1914-1915
- Edgar Laurent 1920
- G. Edouard Nairac 1921-1922
- G. Rozan 1922
- Camile François 1923
- G. Rozan 1923
- Jérôme Tranquille 1924
- Samuel Fouquereaux 1925
- René Maigrot 1926
- Alfred Gellé 1927
- Edgar Laurent 1928-1929
- Arthur Rohan 1930
- Raoul Rochecouste 1931
- Samuel Fouquereaux 1932
- Jérôme Tranquille 1933
- Raoul Rivet 1934 & 1935
- Edgar Laurent 1936
- Samuel Fouquereaux 1937
- G.M.D. Atchia 1938
- Jérôme Tranquille 1939
- Samuel Fouquereaux 1940
- Edgar Laurent 1941
- Samuel Fouquereaux 1942
- Gabriel Martial 1943
- Raoul Rivet 1944
- Samuel Fouquereaux 1945
- G.M.D. Atchia 1946
- Gabriel Martial 1947
- Raymond Hein 1948
- Abdool Razack Mohamed 1949
- Félix Laventure 1950
- Alex Bhujoharry 1951
- Gabriel Martial 1952
- Abdool Razack Mohamed 1953
- Jean Victor Ducasse 1954
- Jules Koenig 1955
- Robert Rey 1955
- Abdool Razack Mohamed 1956
- Edgard Millien 1956
- Edgard Millien 1957
- Seewoosagur Ramgoolam, 1958-1959
- Guy Forget 1959
- Eddy J. Changkye, 1959-1960
- Hosseinbhaye Peerbaye 1961
- Raymond Devienne 1962
- Raymond Hein 1963
- Monaf Fakira 1964
- Alex Rima 1965
- Dorsamy Moorghen 1966
- Marc Fok Seung 1967
- Norbert Poupard 1968-1969
- Gaetan Duval Mayor (1969-1971) and Lord Mayor (1971-1974)
- Vacant 1975-1976
- Kader Bhayat Lord Mayor, 1977
- Mathieu Ange Laclé 1978
- Krishna Baligadoo 1979
- Vacant 1980-1982
- Bashir Khodabux 1983-1984
- Noël Lee Cheong Lem 1985
- Cassam Uteem 1986
- Jérôme Boulle 1986-1988
- Osman Gendoo 1988-1989
- Dinesh Mundil 1989-1990
- José Arunasalom 1990-1991
- Jérôme Boulle 1991-1992
- Ahmad Jeewah 1992-1994
- Jean Claude Barbier 1994-1995
- Moganakaran Veerabadren 1995-1996
- Mohammad Nanhuck 1996-1997
- Luc Désiré Marie 1997-1998
- Gérard Grivon 1998-1999
- Soonildath Gopaul 1999-2000
- Salim Abbas Mamode 2000-2001
- Moganakaran Veerabadren 2001-2002
- Michel Gérard Nina 2002-2003
- Tirat Moossun 2003-2004
- Abdullah Hafeez Hossen 2004-2005
- Reza Goolam Mamode Issack 2005-2007
- Fritz Thomas 2007-2008
- Mahen Goondea 2008-2009
- Sheikh Hossenbocus 2009-2010
- Mahmad Kodabaccus 2010-2012
- Aslam Hosenally 2012-2013
- Dorine Chukowry 2013-2014
- Yusuf Mohangee 2014
- Antonio Seedoo 2015
- Oumar Kholeegan 2015-2017
- Daniel Laurent 2017–2019
- Moussa Cadersaib 2019-2020

== See also ==
- Municipal City Council of Port Louis
- Timeline of Port Louis

== Bibliography ==
- "Municipality of Port Louis: List of mayors and deputy-mayors from 1850". Mauritius Almanac and Colonial Register. 1874.
