= Travellers' Lane =

Tourist site in Port Louis, Mauritius

Travellers' Lane is a site located in the Jardin des Compagnies, an ancient French colonial garden, in Port Louis, Mauritius.

== History ==
It was created in 2010, during the Bicentenary Celebrations of the Battle of Grand Port; the only naval battle won by Napoleon. Port Louis took part in those celebrations. This part of the garden, adjoining the Majestic movie theatre, was to host a planisphere in honour of Al Idrissi, a famous cartographer of Roger II of Sicily and the only one known in the world.

Poet, travel-writer and semiologist Khal Torabully, a native of the capital, was requested to devise a permanent event in this corner of Jardin des Compagnies.

Weeks later, he aligned quotations of travelers such as Ibn Masudi, Marco Polo, Ibn Khodadbeh, Ahmad bin Majid, Joao de Barros and Camoens. More than 20 testimonies were displayed on plaques, along two alleys and a fountain with an original dolphin sculpture, made by Bungshee, who was also commissioned to make the Al Idrissi planisphere.

A stamp celebrating Al Idrissi's contributions was released by the Mauritian Post Office. Travellers' Lane was unveiled during an official ceremony with Navin Ramgoolam, the former Prime Minister, and Mrs. Ameenah Gurib-Fakim, the present Mauritian President.
