= L'hôtel National =

L'hôtel National is a historic former hotel established in 1925 located on the Pope Hennessy Street in Port Louis.

It followed a gradual decline after its main popularity in the 1940s-1960s. Due to its proximity to the Port Louis Theatre and the Champs de Mars Racecourse on the same street, it housed many theatrical troupes, artists and foreign opera singers.

== History ==
Over the decades, the hotel gradually decayed and was eventually abandoned. Although in a state of severe neglect, the building remains a visible symbol of resilience and of Port Louis's 20th cultural heritage and collective memory.

== Cultural significance ==
Malcolm de Chazal, a famous Mauritian painter and poet often stayed at the hotel to write, paint and eat at the famous restaurant.
