= Élysée Aviragnet =

Mauritian teacher

- Born: Jean François Joseph Élysée Aviragnet; 30 July 1828; Port Louis, Mauritius
- Died: 1908 (aged 79–80)
- Occupations: Professor of literature and music
- Known for: Director of the Bucknell School of Music

Jean François Joseph Élysée Aviragnet, born on 30 July 1828 in Port Louis (Mauritius) and died in 1908, was a professor of literature and music. Having emigrated to the United States, he served as the director of the Bucknell School of Music from 1890 until his death.

== Family ==
Aviragnet was the son of a merchant of Bordeaux origin, Pierre Aviragnet, who settled in Mauritius, where he married Lise Chauvot in 1827.

Aviragnet married Lucie Hippolyte Anaïs de Ravel de L'Argentière, from a Dauphinoise family of La Mure established in Mauritius, on 30 May 1853 in Port Louis.

From 1850 to 1864, Aviragnet and his family owned the Château du Grand Clapeau in Blanquefort Caychac (Gironde).

== Biography ==
Aviragnet studied at the Sorbonne. He then taught classical literature and Romance languages in France, Mauritius, and Port of Spain (Trinidad).

Aviragnet later emigrated to the United States, where he became a professor of music. When Bucknell University in Lewisburg, Pennsylvania established a school of music in 1890, he was appointed its director, a position he held until his death. He promoted the development of various musical disciplines and popularized music practice throughout the university.

Aviragnet died in 1908 and was buried in Lewisburg Cemetery.
