= Linion Moris =

Mauritian Political Party

Linion Moris Linion Moris
- Abbreviation: LM
- Founders: Nando Bodha and Rama Valayden
- Founded: 2 September 2023
- Headquarters: Beau Bassin
- Political position: Left
- Colors: Cyan and Burgundy
- National Assembly: 0 / 66

Website
- https://www.linionmoris.com/

Linion Moris is a political party in Mauritius.

== History ==
The party was founded as an alliance between Rassemblement Mauricien (RM) of Nando Bodha, Linion Pep Morisien (LPM) of Rama Valayden, Verts Fraternels of Sylvio Michel and Ralliement Citoyen pour la Patrie (RCP). It was officially launched on 2 September 2023 at Caudan Arts Centre in Port Louis.

Prior to forming the alliance, members of the LPM and RM hosted joint meetings to protest against the Pravind Jugnauth's MSM government. For instance, on Labour Day (1 May 2023) they met at Octave Wiehe auditorium after Nando Bodha had left another short-lived anti-government alliance called Entente de l’Espoir due to disagreements with Paul Bérenger of the MMM. On 16 June 2023 Linion Moris also launched legal action in the Supreme Court to challenge the postponement of municipal elections by the MSM government, and to request a Judicial Review thereof.

== Linion Reform Coalition ==
About 1 year prior to the 2024 General elections, announced that in case of an electoral victory, Bodha would be Prime Minister for the first 3 years, after which Rama Valayden would take over for the remaining 2 years of the term in government. However, in November 2024 a few weeks before the elections, Linon Moris formed a coalition with Roshi Bhadain's Reform Party (Mauritius) called Linion Reform. The coalition presented 60 candidates at the 2024 Mauritian general election but none was elected.
