= Mauritius Ports Authority =

Government agency of Mauritius

Mauritius Ports Authority (MPA)
Agency overview
- Formed: 1988
- Type: Parastatal
- Jurisdiction: Government of Mauritius
- Headquarters: Port Louis, Mauritius
- Agency executives: Ramalingum Maistry, Chairman; Shekur Suntah, Director General
- Website: www.mauport.com

The Mauritius Ports Authority (MPA) is a parastatal organisation in Mauritius, it is the sole regulator and manager of the port and its services.

== Functions ==
Formerly known as the Mauritius Marine Authority (MMA), the MPA is the sole national port authority set up under the Ports Act 1998, to regulate and control the port sectors in Mauritius and Rodrigues. The MPA is a landlord port authority, providing the main port infrastructure and superstructure, together with related facilities. It also provides marine services and navigation aids, while it regulates and controls all port activities and environmental issues within the designated port areas.

As the principal gateway of the country, Port Louis Harbour plays a vital role in the national economy by handling about 99% of the total volume of the external trade. All strategic imports such as food and petroleum products, raw materials for the textile industry, and major exports such as sugar and textile, transit through the harbour.

The strategic objective of the Mauritius Ports Authority (MPA) is to make Port Louis and Port Mathurin Harbours well equipped, professionally managed and constantly upgraded ports in order to maintain high productivity and enhanced service levels at competitive rates. To achieve this objective, MPA will continue to pursue a policy of improvement and opening to the outside world. In the same manner, it will encourage further investment in the ports to respond to the growing needs of the shipping lines and other port stakeholders.

== See also ==
- Port authority
- Port operator
