= Municipal City Council of Port Louis =

Local authority for Port Louis, Mauritius

Coordinates: 20.164386°S 57.504104°E

The Municipal City Council of Port Louis (French: Conseil Municipal de Port Louis), also known as Municipality, is the local authority responsible for the administration of the city of Port Louis, Port Louis District, Mauritius. The Lord Mayor is Daniel Laurent and the Deputy Lord Mayor Marie Désiré Audie Paul Travailleur.

== Municipal elections ==
According to the Local Government Act 2011 PART III Section 11, election of councillors to Municipal Town Council shall be held in 2012 and thereafter every 6 years on such date as the President shall appoint. The council is composed of 24 councillors including the Lord Mayor and Deputy Lord Mayor who are elected for a period of 2 years, while each of the councillors represent wards throughout the city.

In the last elections held on 9 December 2012 the city was divided into 8 wards, the number of registered voters was 111 473. The following councillors were elected during the 2012 Municipal election for the Municipal City Council of Port Louis.

Surnames and other Names	Wards	Groups/Alliances	Vote
ABBAS MAMODE, Mohamad Salim	6	PTR-PMSD	42.02%
ADEBIRO, Olujare Jenny	7	MMM-MSM	55.38%
AUGUSTIN, Daniel Georges Jean	1	MMM-MSM	62.91%
BISSESSUR, Ganeshwarsing	8	PTR-PMSD	49.41%
BISTOQUET, Marie Audrey Martine	4	PTR-PMSD	42.36%
CADAMALLY, Shameem Rassool	5	PTR-PMSD	39.47%
CASERNE, Louis Ludovic Michel	6	MMM-MSM	40.07%
CHIFFONNE, Jean Claude	3	PTR-PMSD	46.75%
CHOOMKA, Zareena Tawheen	5	PTR-PMSD	36.28%
CHUKOWRY, Marie Christiane Dorine	1	MMM-MSM	61.41%
COTRY, Gino Nicolas France	3	MMM-MSM	47.42%
DOBA, Ismaël Yacoob	4	PTR-PMSD	43.87%
GONDEEA, Mahendra	3	PTR-PMSD	46.77%
HOSSENALLY, Aslam Adam	6	MMM-MSM	42.02%
HURREERAM, Mahendranuth Sharma	8	MMM-MSM	45.73%
JADOO, Roubina	4	MMM-MSM	45.05%
KAWROO, Muhammad Eshan Ally	2	MMM-MSM	39.07%
LAURENT, Daniel Eric Clive	7	MMM-MSM	55.64%
MOHANGEE, Yusuf	5	MMM-MSM	33.79%
OZEER, Sheik Ahad Khan	8	PTR-PMSD	46.72%
SEEGOULAM, Ahmad	2	PTR-PMSD	41.66%
SERVANSINGH, Phalraj	1	MMM-MSM	44.06%
TENERMONT, Marie Cristine	7	MMM-MSM	55.57%
UTTEENUM, Aboobakar	2	PTR-PMSD	37.96%

== See also ==
- List of mayors of Port Louis
