= Roshi Bhadain =

Mauritian politician (born 1971)

The Honorable Roshi Sudarshan Bhadain रोशि बादें MP GCSK
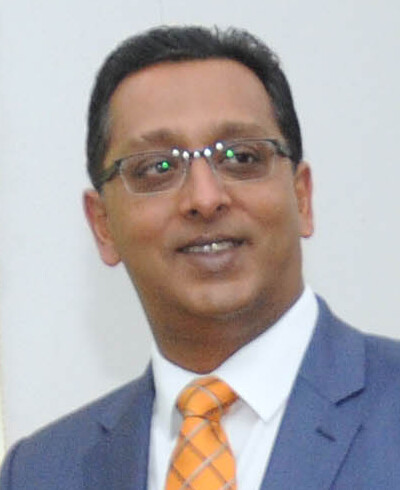

Minister of Financial Services, Good Governance and Institutional Reforms
- In office 22 December 2014 – 23 January 2017
- President: Ameenah Gurib
- Prime Minister: Sir Anerood Jugnauth

Member of Parliament (MP)
- In office 22 December 2014 – 16 June 2017
- President: Ameenah Gurib
- Prime Minister: Sir Anerood Jugnauth; Pravind Jugnauth

Leader of Reform Party
- Incumbent
- Assumed office 23 January 2017

Personal details
- Born: 25 April 1971 (age 55) Mauritius
- Party: Reform Party (present)
- Spouse: Reena Bhadain
- Children: Rishon Bhadain, Rishna Bhadain, Angelina Bhadain
- Education: Fellow of the Association of Chartered Certified Accountant (FCCA) (UK)
- Occupation: Lawyer; Accountant; Fraud Investigator; Politician
- Awards: Grand Commander of the Order of the Star and Key of the Indian Ocean (2016)

(Roshi) Sudarshan Bhadain (GCSK) (born 25 April 1971) is a Mauritian politician.

== Education and Professional career ==
Roshi Bhadain completed his secondary education at Royal College Curepipe before studying law at the University of West England,(also known as UWE Bristol). He also pursued studies in accountancy and worked for KPMG in England. Upon returning to Mauritius, he worked at the Economic Crime Office (ECO), which was later restructured into the Independent Commission Against Corruption (Mauritius). Since 2002, Bhadain has practiced as a Barrister-at-Law in Mauritius and has been a Fellow Chartered Certified Accountant (FCCA), specializing in fraud, financial crime, corruption and money laundering.

== Political career ==
In the National Assembly elections held on 10 December 2014, Roshi Bhadain was elected as a candidate of Alliance Lepep (MSM-PMSD-ML) in Constituency No. 18 (Belle Rose-Quatre Bornes) He served as the Minister of Financial Services, Good Governance, and Institutional Reforms under the Militant Socialist Movement (MSM) government. On 23 January 2017, Bhadain resigned from the MSM-ML government, citing disagreements with the undue influence of vested interests on the government led by Pravind Jugnauth, which followed the unexpected resignation of Prime Minister Sir Anerood Jugnauth.

After the 2014 elections, Roshi Bhadain, while serving as a minister, addressed the Director of Public Prosecutions (DPP) on public media and concurrently defended a prosecution commission bill. Had the prosecution commission bill been enacted into law, it would have granted the administration greater power over the Director of Public Prosecutions (DPP), significantly affecting the democratic framework of Mauritius. To prevent this, the Parti Mauricien Social Démocrate (PMSD) resigned from the government by the end of 2016, which diminished the bill's chances of passing in the National Assembly.

Roshi Bhadain served as a back-bencher in the government for less than six months before resigning from Parliament on 16 June 2017. He stated that his resignation was due to disagreements with the safety and financial aspects of the Metro Express project. Roshi Bhadain's resignation triggered by-elections in Constituency No. 18, held on 17 December 2017.

In these by-elections, Arvin Boolell secured a seat in Parliament. Bhadain finished in third place with 2,913 votes, behind Arvin Boolell, who received 7,990 votes, and Nita Juddoo, who received 4,839 votes. Following Bhadain were trade unionist Jack Bizlall in fourth place, Dhanesh Maraye in fifth, Tania Diolle in sixth, and Kugan Parapen in seventh. Since 2017, Bhadain has been the leader of the Reform Party (Mauritius), which he founded after leaving the Militant Socialist Movement (MSM).

== Controversies ==
=== 2013 India land sale and Labour Party swindler Bangaleea ===
In November 2012, Nitesh Ramdharry, a Triolet resident and activist with the Parti Travailliste, appeared in a local newspaper claiming he had been assaulted by individuals associated with Parti Travailliste agent Hemant Bangaleea, who lived nearby. Ramdharry alleged that he had paid Rs 40 million to Bangaleea, who was imprisoned, to purchase 6 arpents of land in Goa, India, for a hotel resort. However, Ramdharry discovered that Bangaleea had provided a fake contract. Ramdharry sought legal assistance from Roshi Bhadain to recover his funds. Subsequently, Ramdharry accused Bhadain in two affidavits of advising him to inflate the amount paid from Rs 8.7 million to Rs 40 million and to name three former Parti Travailliste ministers—Anil Bachoo, Vasant Bunwaree, and Rajesh Jeetah—in an attempt to create a political scandal. On 17 December 2013, while Navin Ramgoolam was Prime Minister, Bhadain was interrogated by the Central Criminal Investigation Department (CCID) and faced charges of conspiracy and failing to provide a receipt. Bhadain later sued Ramdharry for false and malicious accusations, given that Ramdharry had made the payment to Bangaleea before Bhadain's involvement. In March 2014, all cases against Bhadain were dismissed due to Ramdharry's questionable credibility and past.

=== 2021 L'affaire bois de teck ===
On 17 December 2021, Roshi Bhadain was arrested at his residence in Albion by the Major Crime Investigation Team (MCIT) on provisional charges of conspiracy to commit larceny. The charges were related to an alleged plot to steal valuable teak wood, which was stored at the Development Works Corporation (DWC) warehouse in Pailles. This case, known as L'affaire bois de teck or Scandale lames en teck in the Mauritian press, involved a carpenter named Joseph Kinsley Perrine, who reported to the police that an intermediary named Bijay Greedharry had sought his services to install teak boards at Bhadain's residence in 2011, when Bhadain was a director at the Independent Commission Against Corruption (ICAC). The police suspected that Bhadain had instructed an ICAC inspector in connection with the case. In 2010, there had been a robbery at the DWC warehouse, and it was believed that the stolen hardwood was sent to a carpentry workshop in Roche Bois before being used at Bhadain's home. Greedharry allegedly bribed a DWC security guard with Rs 10,000 to facilitate the theft. In 2011, Perrine was arrested for stealing 300 boards and 70 pieces of timber. Bhadain claimed he had paid Rs 70 per square foot for the teak boards and accused gambling and underworld figure Jean Michel Lee Shim of a political conspiracy, supporting his claims with audio recordings submitted to the Director of Public Prosecutions. By mid-March 2022, one witness had withdrawn his statement, and all charges against Bhadain were dropped.

== Award and Decoration ==
- Mauritius:
  - Grand Commander of the Order of the Star and Key of the Indian Ocean (2016)
