= Port Louis =

Capital city of Mauritius

Port Louis Porlwi (Morisyen) Port-Louis (French)
- Capital city
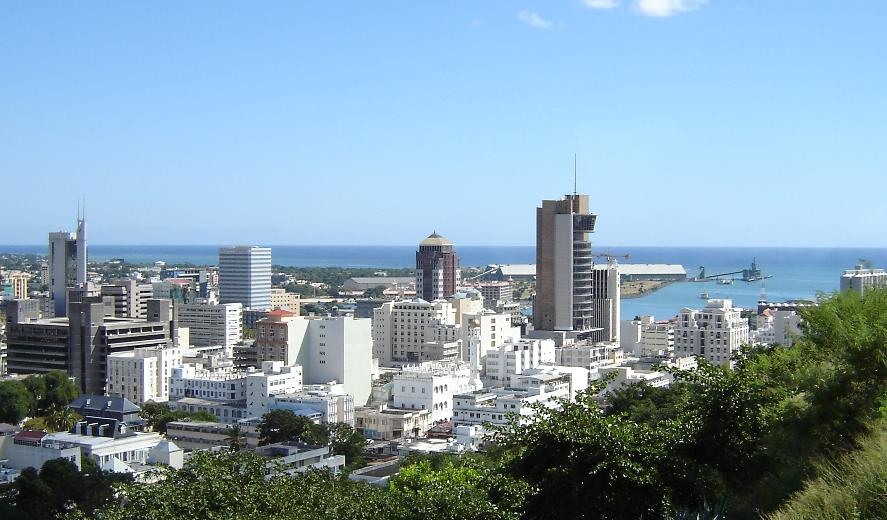
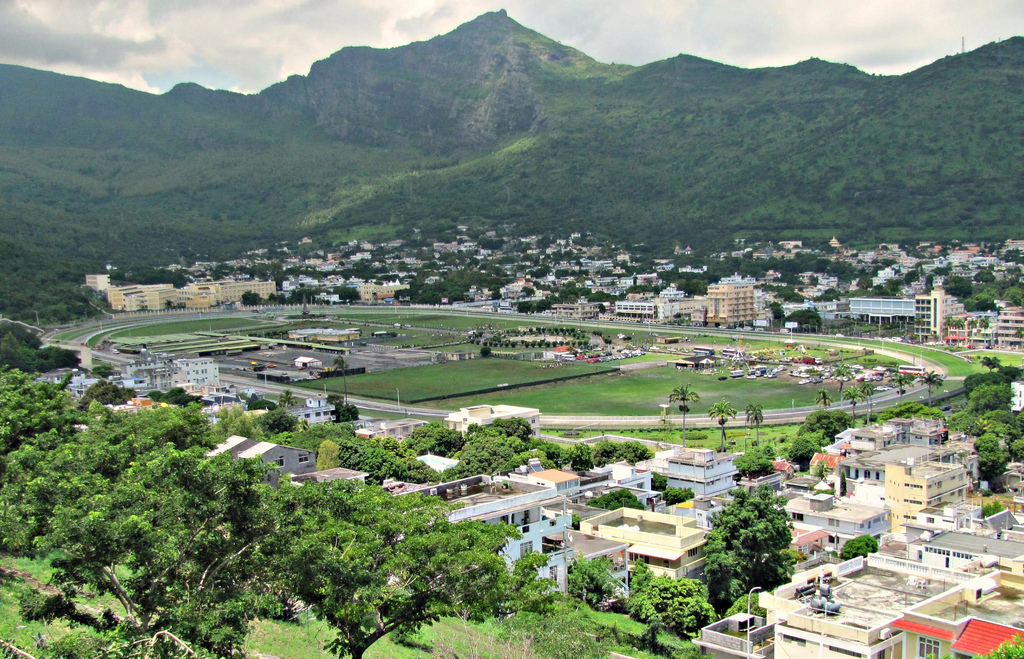
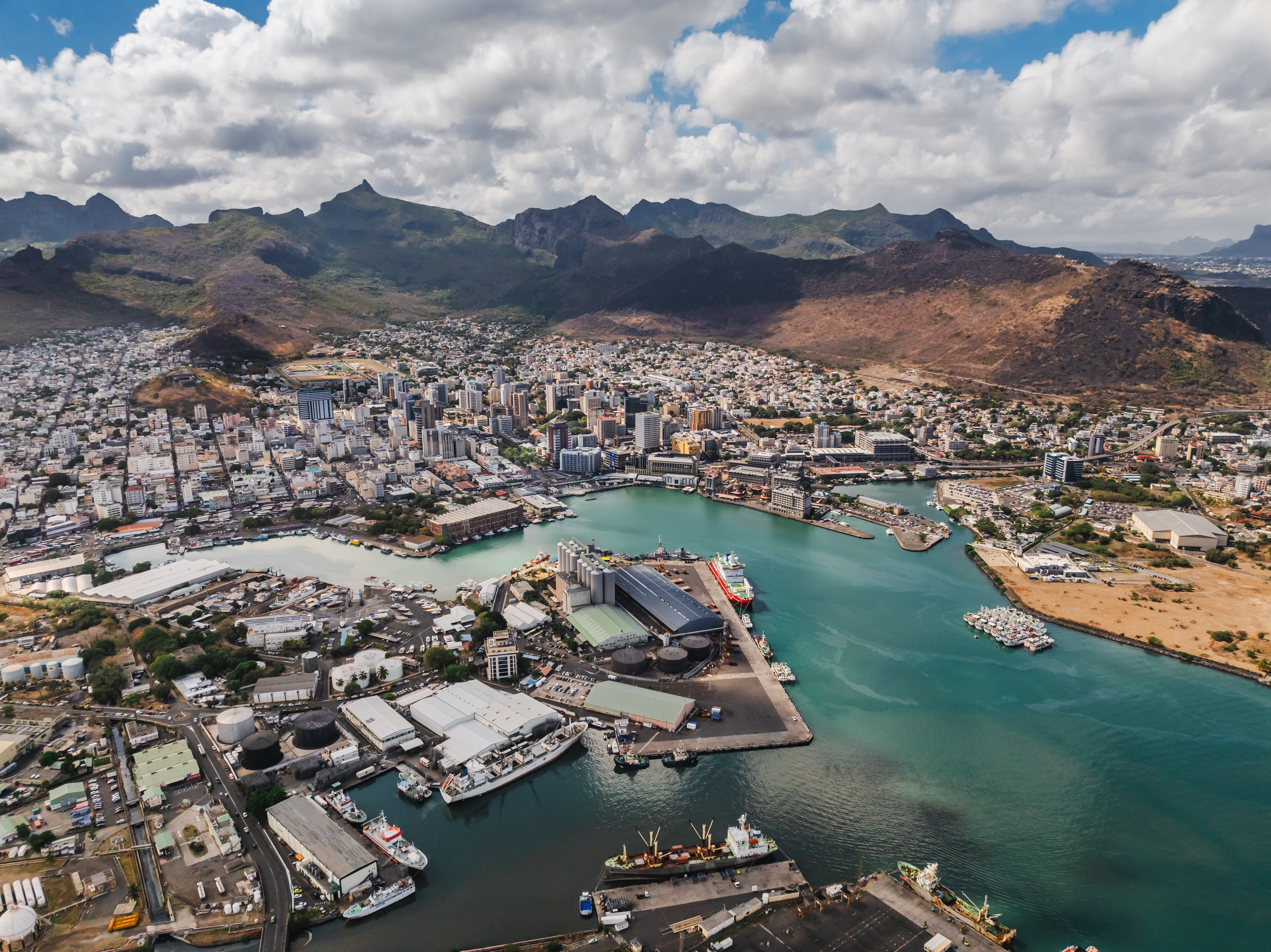
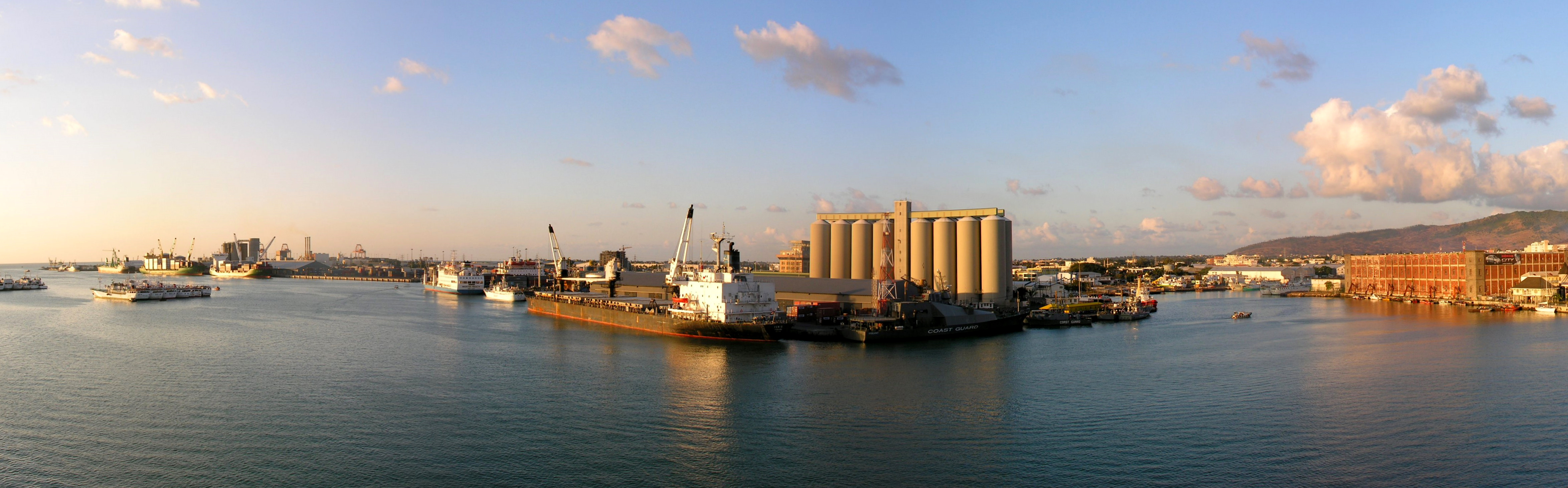
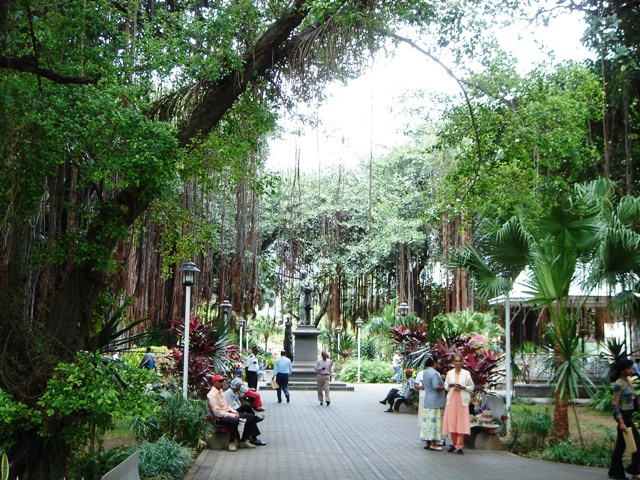
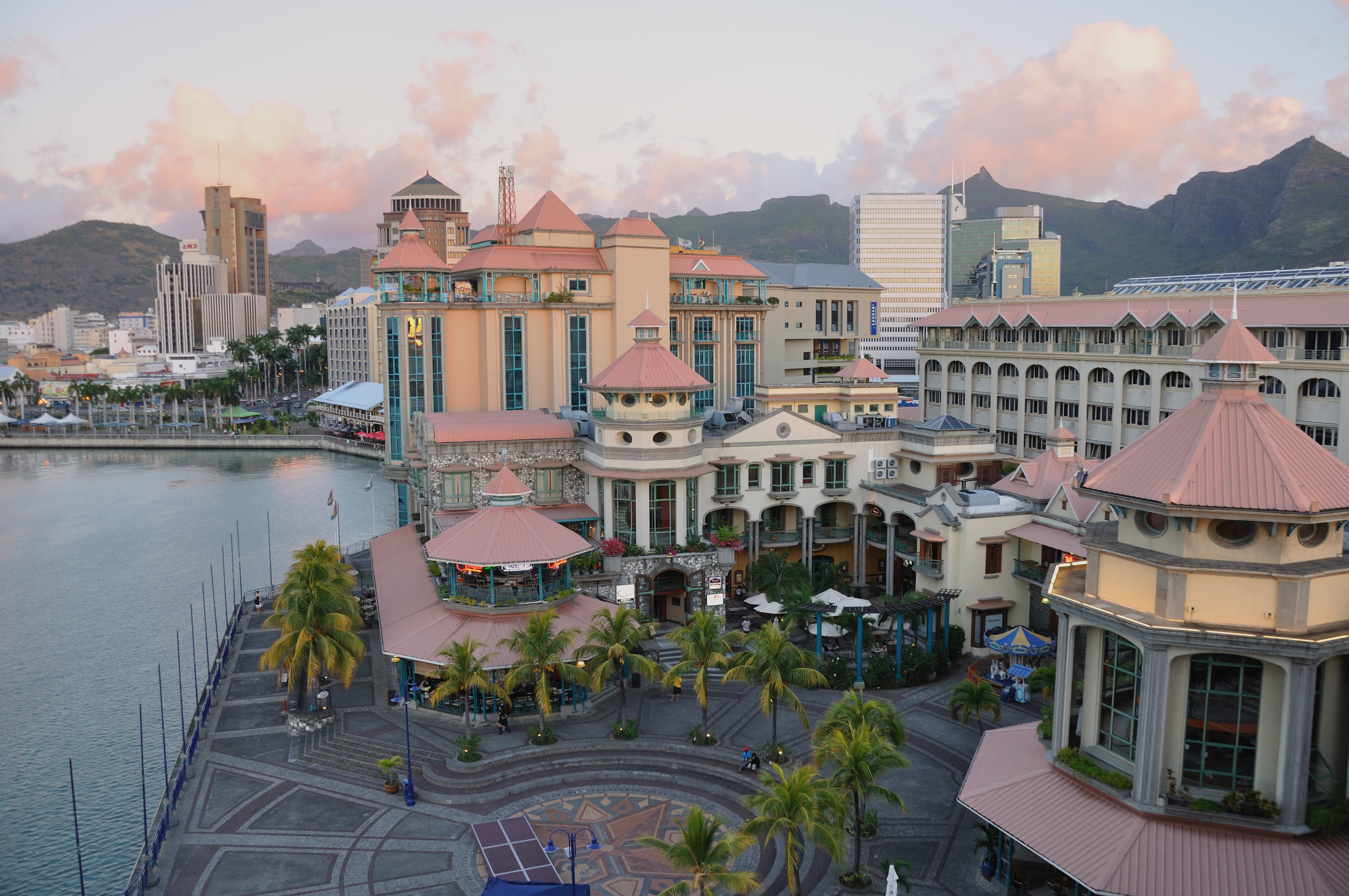
- Port Louis skyline Champ de Mars Aerial view of Port Louis Port Louis Harbour Jardin de la Compagnie The Caudan Waterfront

- Flag Coat of arms
- Motto: "Concordia et Progressio" (Latin for "Harmony and Progress")
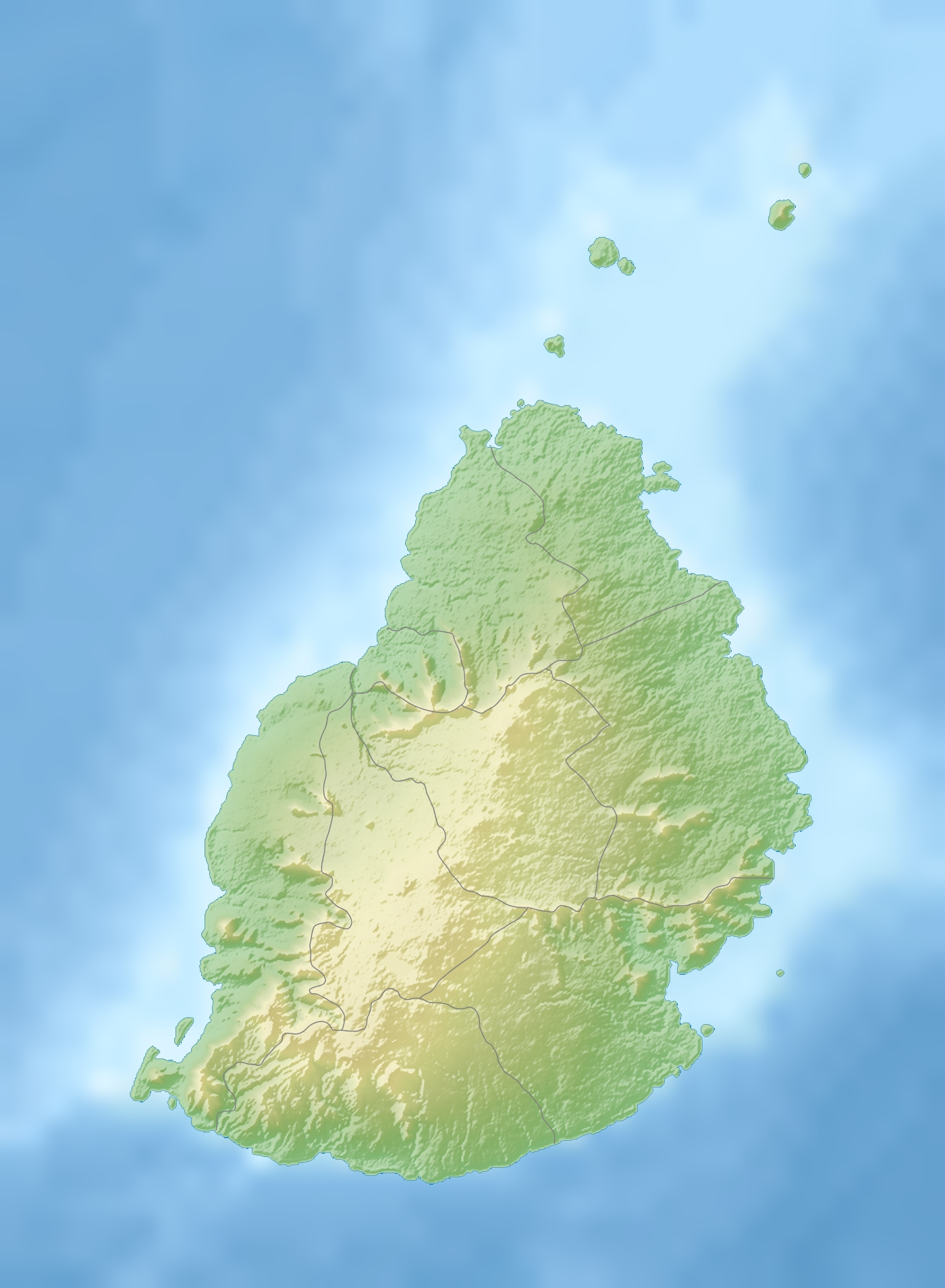
- Location in Mauritius Port Louis (Africa)
- Coordinates: 20°9′52″S 57°30′15″E
- Country: Mauritius
- District: Port Louis District
- Founded: 1638
- Town: 25 August 1966
- City: 12 December 2011

Government
  - Type: Municipality
  - Lord Mayor: Christelle Pondard
  - Deputy Lord Mayor: Mehzabeen Caramtali

Area
  - Capital city: 46.7 km^{2} (18.0 sq mi)

Population (2022)
  - Capital city: 140,403
  - Rank: 1st in Mauritius
  - Density: 3,010/km^{2} (7,790/sq mi)
  - Urban: 300,000
  - Metro: 557,431
- Time zone: UTC+04:00 (MUT)
- Website: Municipal Council

Port Louis (French: Port-Louis, [pɔʁ lwi]; Mauritian Creole: Porlwi, [poːlwi]) is the capital and most populous city of Mauritius, mainly located in the Port Louis District, with a small western part in the Black River District. Port Louis is the country's financial and political centre. It is administered by the Municipal City Council of Port Louis. According to the 2018 census conducted by Statistics Mauritius, the population was 147,066.

== History ==
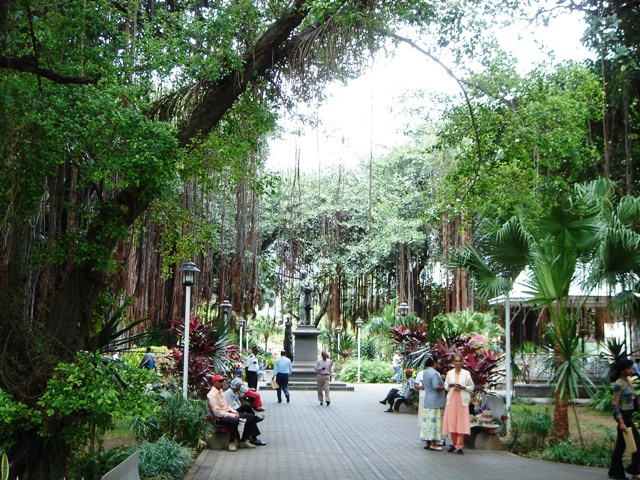
Jardin de la Compagnie (Company Gardens in English). Originally the vegetable patch of the French Indies Company.

Port Louis was used as a harbour by the Dutch settlers from 1606, when they started to refer to the area as Harbour of Tortoises. In 1736, under French government, it became the administrative centre of Mauritius and a major reprovisioning halt for French ships during their passage between Asia and Europe, around the Cape of Good Hope. The port is named in honour of King Louis XV. During this period of French colonization, Mauritius was known as Ile de France. The French governor at that time, Bertrand-François Mahé de La Bourdonnais, contributed to the development of the city. Since Port Louis was relatively well-protected from strong winds during cyclones by the Moka Mountain Range, Port Louis was selected to house both the main harbor and fort for the island. The value of the port continued during the British occupation of the island during the Napoleonic Wars (1800–15), and helped Britain control the Indian Ocean. However, port calls of ships fell drastically following the opening of the Suez Canal in 1869. Activity in the port increased during the seven-year closure of the Suez Canal (starting in 1967). Modernization of the port in the late 1970s has helped it maintain its role as the central point for all imports and exports from Mauritius. While Port Louis continues to be the business and administrative capital of Mauritius, expansion of the tourism industry in the late 1990s led to considerable development in Port Louis, with many shops, hotels, and restaurants being built in the Caudan Waterfront area.

Raouf Oderuth, the Mauritian Artist provides a 1930s scene depicting the waterfront when motorised transportation hardly existed. Place D'Armes is still recognisable despite high-rise buildings, heavy traffic jams, and crowds of pedestrians.

== Government ==
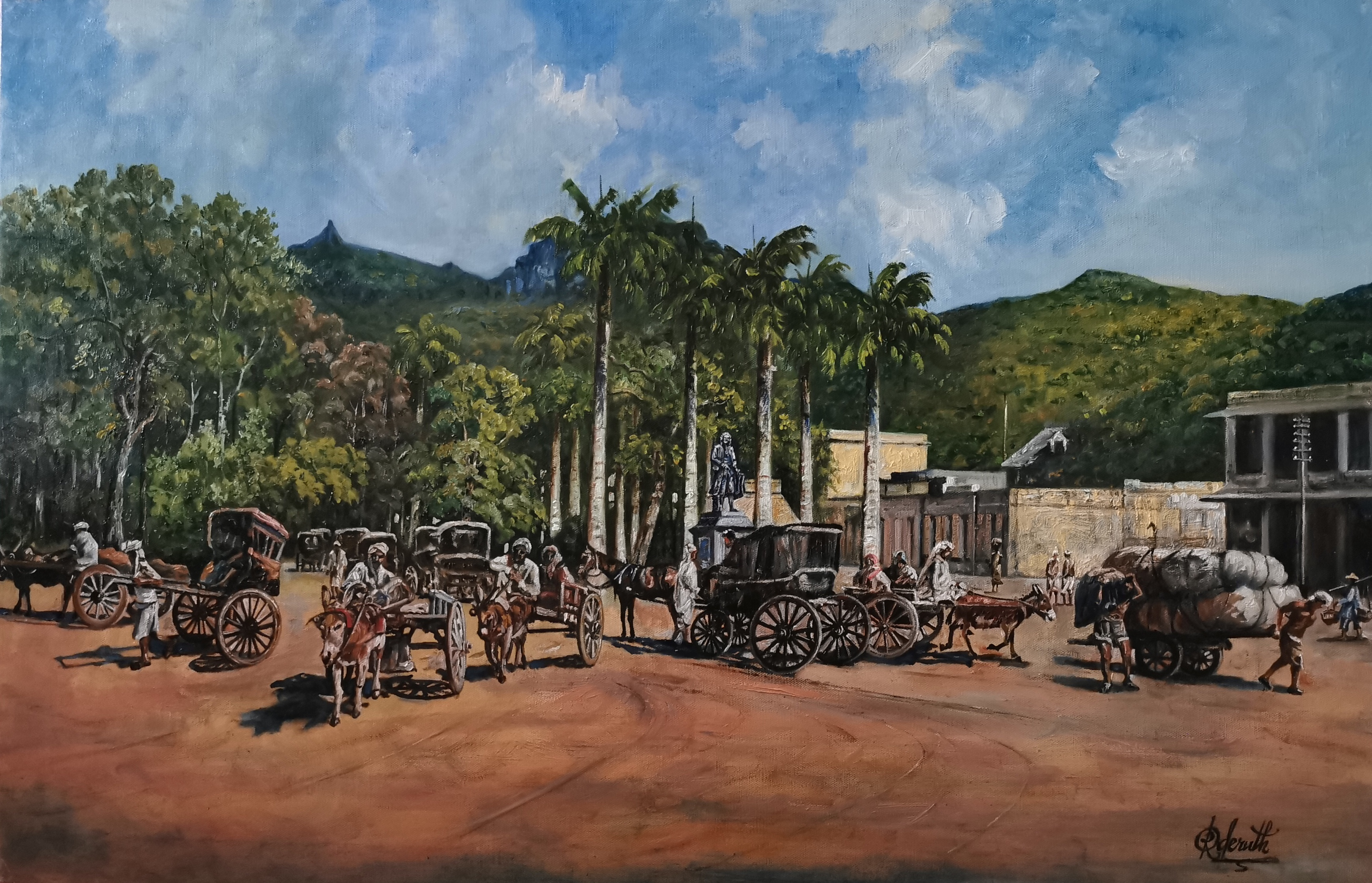
A historical perspective

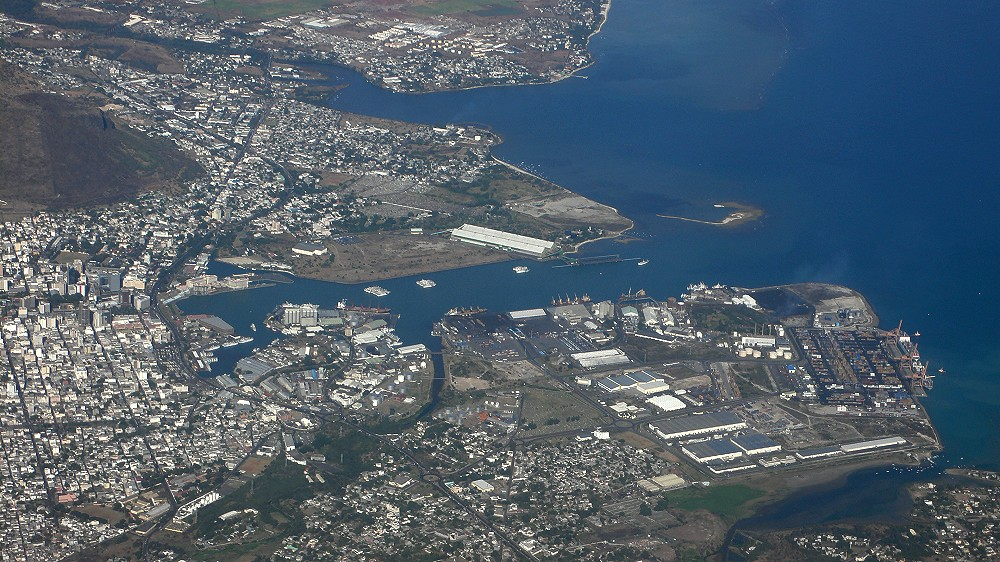
Aerial view of Port Louis

The local governance of Port Louis is overseen by a municipal city council. The City Council of Port Louis was first established in 1830 and is currently one of five municipal councils responsible for the urban areas in Mauritius, as organized under Local Government Act 2011. The municipal city council has 32 members. The city is electorally divided into eight wards that each return four councillors.

Councillors then elect a Lord Mayor and a Deputy Lord Mayor. Functions of the council are performed through Departments of Administration, Finance, Land Use and Planning, Public Infrastructure, Public Health, Welfare, Parks and Gardens, and the City Library. Services delivered by the local government include preschool, kindergarten, and vocational schools, health protection, housing regulation, road services, refuse collection, cemeteries, some environmental and consumer protection services, and economic promotion activities. Other services are provided to the city by the central government. These include police services through the Mauritius Police Force, which maintains two divisions responsible for the Port Louis area (Metropolitan Divisions North and South). There is also a specific Port Police, composed of the Harbour Police and Bulk Sugar Terminal Police. Their roles include providing security to cargo and facilities in the port area and enforcing laws related to harbour regulations, customs, quarantine, immigration, and drug trafficking.

Port Louis is divided into different suburbs, including but not limited to:

- Bell-Village
- Borstal
- Camp Yoloff
- Cassis
- Champ-de-Mars
- Cité La Cure
- Cité Vallijee
- Grande-Rivière-Nord-Ouest
- La Tour Koënig
- Pailles
- Plaine Lauzun
- Plaine-Verte
- Pointe-aux-Sables
- Roche-Bois
- Sainte-Croix
- Tranquebar
- Vallée-des-Prêtres
- Vallée-Pitot

During the 2025 municipal elections, Alliance du Changement won 31 of the 32 council seats, while an independent secured one. On 25 May 2026, the council elected Christelle Pondard of the Labour Party as lord mayor and Mehzabeen Caramtali of the Mauritian Militant Movement as deputy lord mayor.

== Climate ==
Owing to its location in the rain shadow of the southeast trade winds, Port Louis features a tropical savanna climate (Aw) under Köppen's climate classification. Its wettest months are from December through April where on average 80 mm (3.1 in) (or more) of rainfall occurs each month. The remaining months form Port Louis' dry season. The city also shows a noticeable but small range of average temperatures. Port Louis' coolest temperatures are seen mid-year where average high temperatures are around 27 °C or 80.6 °F. During the height of the wet season, the city sees its highest temperatures where average high temperatures are usually around 31 °C or 88 °F.

Climate data for Port Louis
| Month | Jan | Feb | Mar | Apr | May | Jun | Jul | Aug | Sep | Oct | Nov | Dec | Year |
|---|---|---|---|---|---|---|---|---|---|---|---|---|---|
| Mean daily maximum °C (°F) | 31.5 (88.7) | 31.4 (88.5) | 31.5 (88.7) | 30.7 (87.3) | 29.3 (84.7) | 27.6 (81.7) | 26.7 (80.1) | 26.8 (80.2) | 27.7 (81.9) | 28.8 (83.8) | 30.2 (86.4) | 31.1 (88.0) | 29.4 (85.0) |
| Daily mean °C (°F) | 27.8 (82.0) | 27.7 (81.9) | 27.7 (81.9) | 26.9 (80.4) | 25.4 (77.7) | 23.8 (74.8) | 23.0 (73.4) | 23.0 (73.4) | 23.6 (74.5) | 24.6 (76.3) | 26.0 (78.8) | 27.2 (81.0) | 25.6 (78.0) |
| Mean daily minimum °C (°F) | 24.1 (75.4) | 24.0 (75.2) | 23.8 (74.8) | 23.0 (73.4) | 21.5 (70.7) | 19.9 (67.8) | 19.3 (66.7) | 19.1 (66.4) | 19.4 (66.9) | 20.4 (68.7) | 21.8 (71.2) | 23.2 (73.8) | 21.6 (70.9) |
| Average rainfall mm (inches) | 131 (5.2) | 160 (6.3) | 83 (3.3) | 87 (3.4) | 48 (1.9) | 24 (0.9) | 18 (0.7) | 19 (0.7) | 17 (0.7) | 15 (0.6) | 24 (0.9) | 85 (3.3) | 711 (27.9) |
| Average rainy days (≥ 1.0 mm) | 9 | 10 | 8 | 7 | 6 | 4 | 4 | 5 | 3 | 3 | 3 | 6 | 68 |
| Average relative humidity (%) | 81.2 | 82.0 | 81.5 | 80.9 | 77.9 | 74.8 | 75.4 | 74.1 | 74.1 | 74.5 | 75.8 | 77.4 | 77.5 |
| Mean monthly sunshine hours | 248 | 226 | 217 | 240 | 248 | 210 | 217 | 217 | 240 | 279 | 270 | 279 | 2,891 |
Source 1: World Meteorological Organization.
Source 2: BBC Weather, Weather.Directory

== Economy ==
The economy of the city is mostly dominated by its financial centre, port facilities, tourism, and the manufacturing sector which includes textiles, chemicals, plastics and pharmaceuticals. Port Louis is home to the biggest port facility in the Indian Ocean region and one of Africa's major financial centres.

Tourism has grown in Mauritius since the beginning of the 21^{st} century. In 2009, 871,356 tourists arrived in Mauritius, and the number climbed to 934,827 in 2010. By 2018, 1,399,408 tourists arrived in Mauritius, and the number was about the same in 2019 at 1,383,488. Like all parts of the globe, tourism declined significantly both during and after the COVID-19 pandemic. Tourism in Mauritius has nearly recovered to pre-COVID-19 levels: in 2022, it was only at 997,290, but by 2023, 1,295,410 tourists visited.

=== Finance industry ===
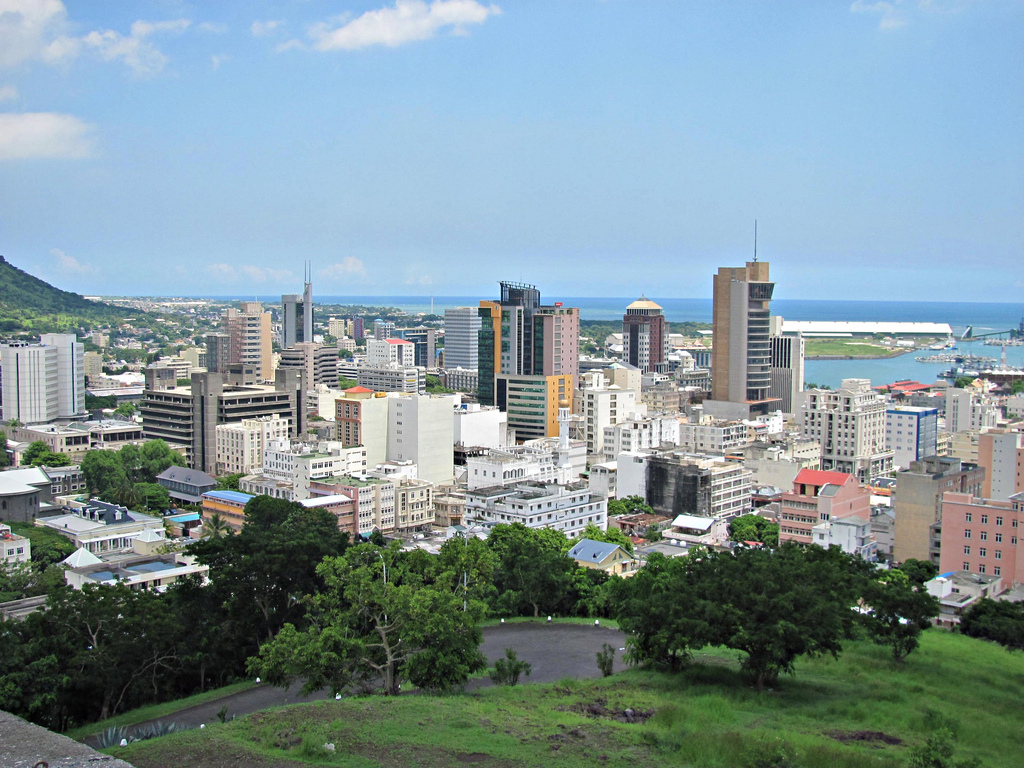
The skyline of Port Louis, dominated by the Bank of Mauritius Tower

Port Louis is the financial centre of Mauritius, which has established itself as safe and trusted location for conducting business due to its strong democracy, political stability, and multilingual population. Located in Port Louis is the Stock Exchange of Mauritius. Also in Port Louis are over ten commercial banks that serve both domestic and offshore clients, insurance companies, pension funds, mutual funds, leasing companies, and foreign exchange dealers. The oldest bank based in Port Louis is the Mauritius Commercial Bank, which was founded in 1838. The Bank of Mauritius is the central bank of the country. Measuring 124 m (407 ft) from ground level to its pinnacle, the Bank of Mauritius Tower is the tallest building in the country.

== Transportation ==
Port Louis is served by two major bus stations. Victoria Station is used by buses to and from the eastern and southern areas and the Plaines Wilhems district. Immigration Square, also known as Gare du Nord, is a terminus for buses coming from the northern districts of Pamplemousses and Rivière du Rempart. A number of inter-city buses carry passengers to and from nearby suburbs such as Plaine Verte, Vallée-des-Prêtres, Pailles, Plaine Lauzun, and Cité Vallijee. Most streets in Port Louis are laid out in rectangular grids, and many are one-way. Although most roads are in good shape, many streets are fairly narrow as would be expected for a historic colonial town. Due to the daily influx of workers to business and government offices in Port Louis, day-time traffic can be quite heavy and finding parking spaces a challenge. To cope with increasing traffic congestion, the government has proposed a light rail transit system. Other suggestions have included moving some of the 24 government ministries currently located in Port Louis to surrounding regions or introducing flexible work schedules.

An effort to move workers from the city centre has already started with the construction of the Ébène office tower complex south of Port Louis. A ring road passing on the east side of Port Louis is also expected to reduce congestion. Phase 1 of that project was completed in 2013, but in February 2014 the road needed to be closed due to the appearance of a major crack, apparently due to faulty design.

Another project initiated to reduce congestion is the construction of a bridge (commonly referred to as the "Dream Bridge") from Les Salines to Roche-Bois, which will span the Port Louis harbour.

=== Light rail transit system ===
In 2012, the government decided to construct an approximately 25 km (16 mi) rail system between Curepipe and Port Louis, which had been under consideration for nearly three decades. The project was initiated by a government-to-government agreement with the Singapore Cooperation Enterprise (SCE), along with private partners Singapore Mass Rapid Transit Corporation (SMRT) and the South African/Australian engineering firm Aurecon Ltd. The goal was to develop a preliminary plan of the system, and then solicit expressions of interest for a design-build-operate-finance scheme.

Construction for the light rail transit transport system began in the fall of 2017, with the government of Mauritius awarding the contract to the Mumbai-based design and construction firm Larsen & Toubro. The first stage of Mauritius Metro Express, from Port Louis to Rose Hill Central, was opened in January 2020, the second stage, an extension to Curepipe, in October 2022.

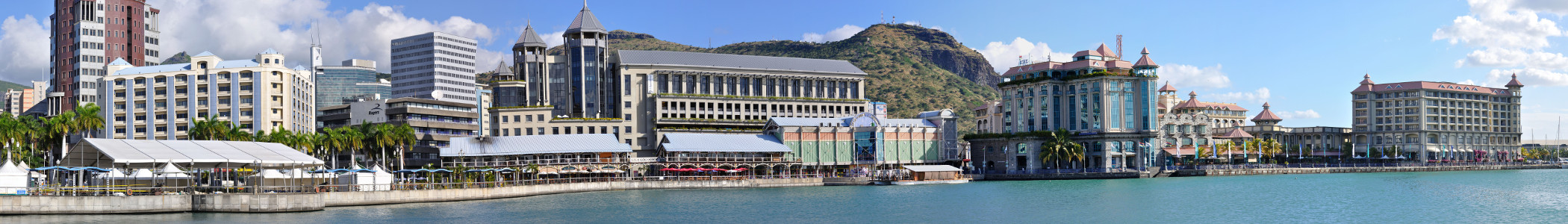
Panoramic view of Port Louis

=== Port ===
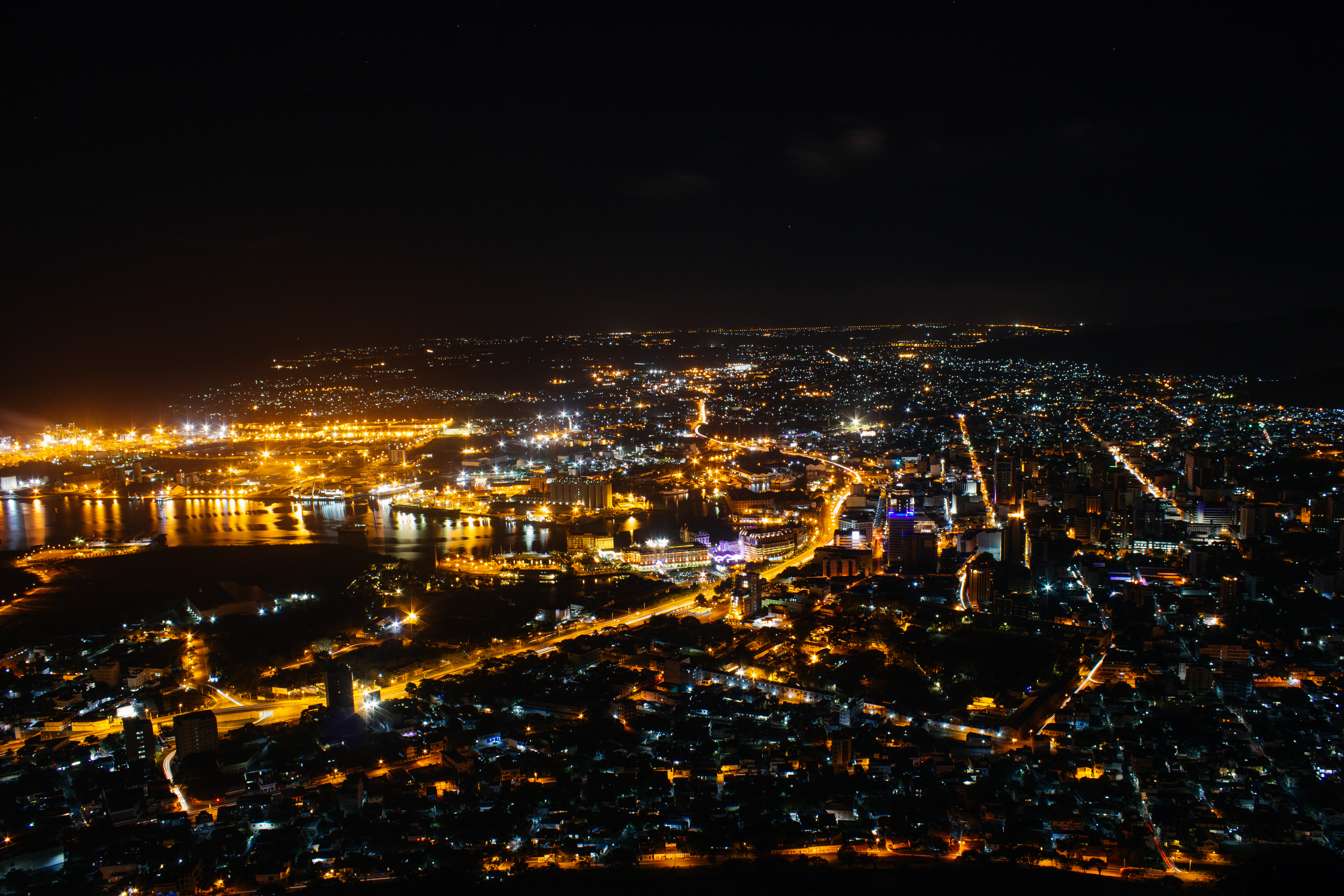
Aerial view of the city at night, featuring the port

Port Louis is home to the nation's main harbour, which is the only official port of entry and exit for sea vessels in Mauritius. Ships must be cleared in the port before visiting any other anchorage on the island-nation.

The Mauritius Ports Authority (MPA), established by law in 1998, is the port authority responsible for Port Louis. The MPA provides port infrastructure, enters into contracts with private providers for port and cargo-handling services, promotes the use and development of the ports, and licenses and regulates port and marine services. The harbour adjoins the main city, with the port currently comprising three terminals. Terminal I contains a total of 1,180 m (3,870 ft) of quay, with six berthing positions for cargo, passengers, and fishing boats. Terminal II contains 986 m (3,235 ft) of quays with six berthing positions and includes specialized facilities for handling and storing sugar, fish, tallow, and caustic soda. In particular, the Bulk Sugar Terminal (operated by the Mauritius Sugar Terminal Corporation) can handle vessels with up to 11 m (36 ft) of draft, can load sugar at a rate of 1450 tons per hour, and can store 175,000 tons of cargo. Also present in Terminal II is a dedicated 124 m (407 ft) cruise ship jetty, with a dredged depth of 10.8 m (35 ft). Terminal III has two 280 m (920 ft) quays with a depth of 14 m (46 ft), and is specialized for handling container ships, having three super-post-Panamax and five post-Panamax gantry cranes. Also present are storage facilities for bulk ethanol and tie-in points for reefer containers. Vessels too large to dock at the quays can anchor at the Outer Anchorage, which is still within the official boundaries of the port.

The number of ships visiting the port numbered over 2,200 annually in 2010. In 2019, cargo container capacity was 1 million TEUs (twenty-foot equivalent units). Overall, the port contributes 2% to the country's GDP.

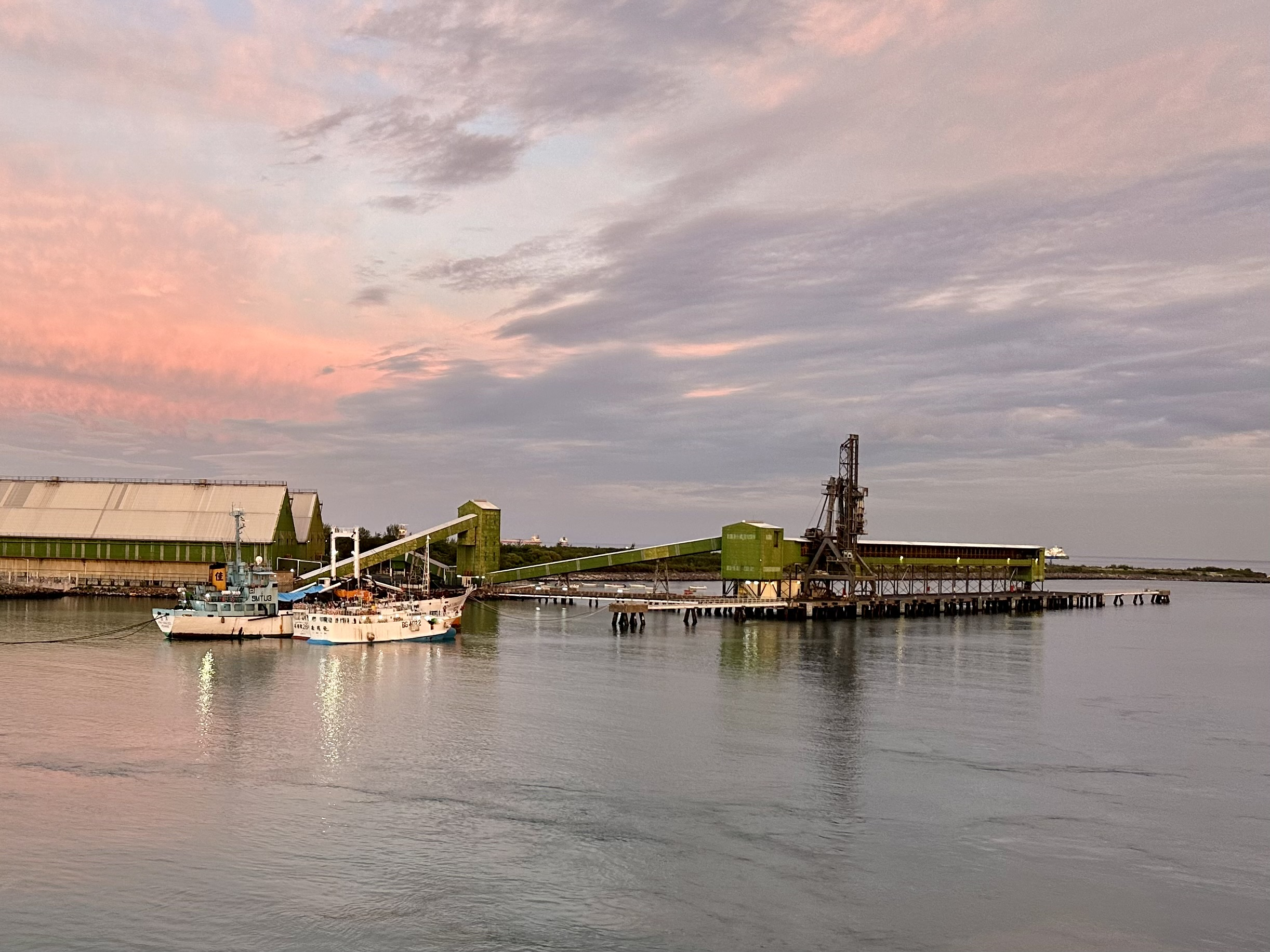
Port Louis, Mauritius, Bulk Sugar Terminal Quay

The cruise ship terminal, opened in 2010 and named after Christian Decotter (past chairman of the Mauritius Tourism Advisory Board), illustrates the increasing role of tourism in the economy of Mauritius. Cruise ships of up to 300 m (980 ft) can be accommodated at the facility, which includes two access bridges for passengers and vehicles. The facility was the first in the Indian Ocean to be capable of handling the largest cruise ships in the world. In 2012, passenger arrivals by sea included 11,510 tourists and 6,450 excursionists who arrived aboard 23 cruise ships.

== Education ==
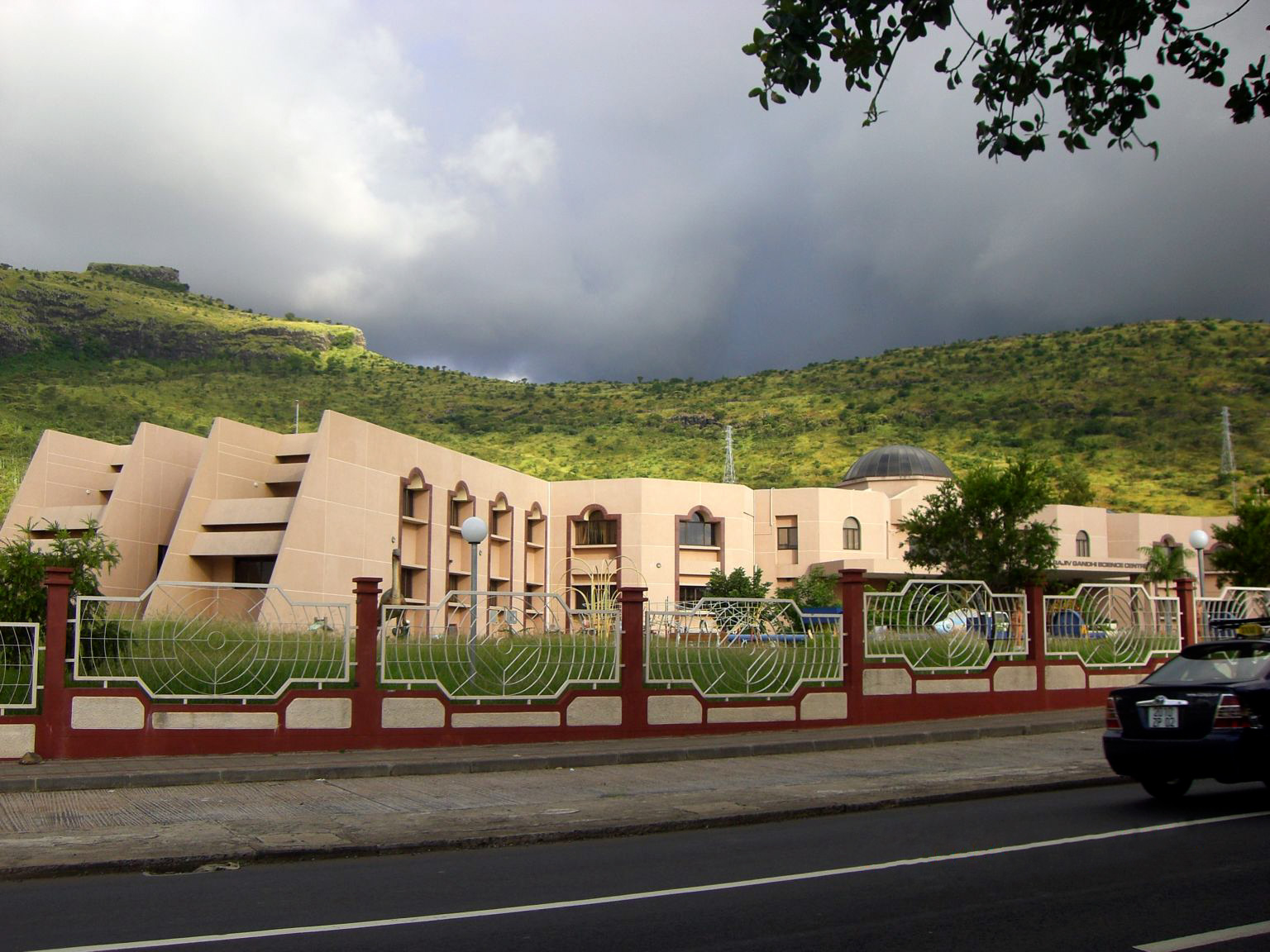
Rajiv Gandhi Science Centre in Port Louis

Port-Louis houses several secondary schools which include Alpha College, Bhujoharry College, Labourdonnais College, Port Louis Academy, Loreto College, Madad Ul Islam Girls College, Muslim Girls College, City College, Full Day School, Institute of Islamic and Secular Studies, London College, Ocep The Open College, and Port Louis High School, MEDCO Trinity Secondary School, MEDCO Trinity Secondary School, Port Louis North SSS, and Sir Abdool Razack Mohammed SSS, Goolam Mohammed Dawjee Atchia State College, MEDCO Cassis Secondary School, Renganaden Seeneevassen SSS, Port Louis SSS and Royal College Port Louis. The state also operates a vocational school for boys, Immaculee Conception SSV.

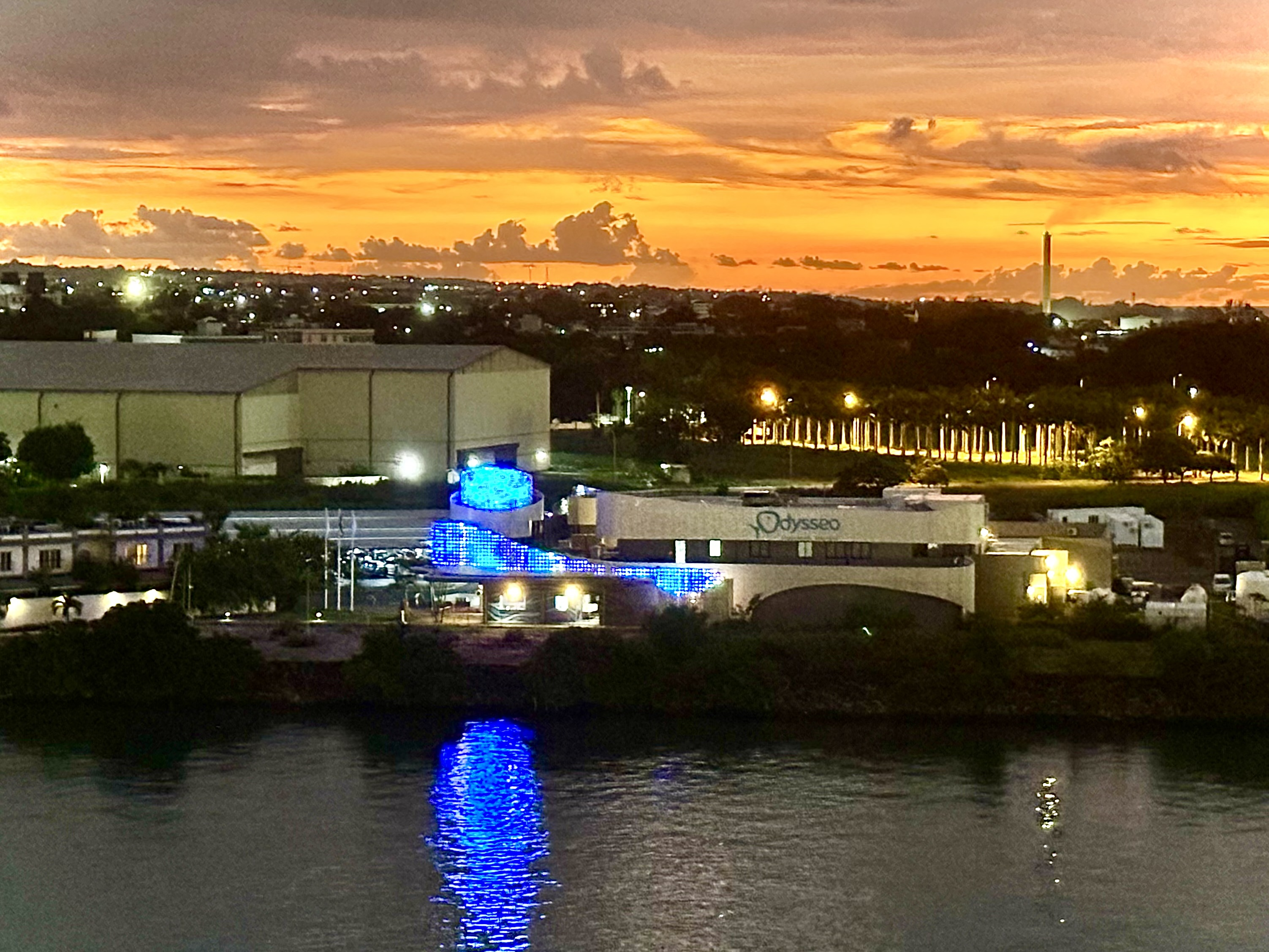
Odyssey Oceanarium Mauritius

The major institute of tertiary education in Port Louis is the University of Technology, Mauritius, a public university with a technology focus. The École de Medecine Louis Pasteur prepares students for medical studies at Université de Lille in France. Several technical schools also have locations in the city, including the Jhurry Rya School which specializes in information technology, Appavoo Business School, Apollo Bramwell Nursing School, BSP School of Accountancy & Management, and the London College of Accountancy.

== Architecture ==
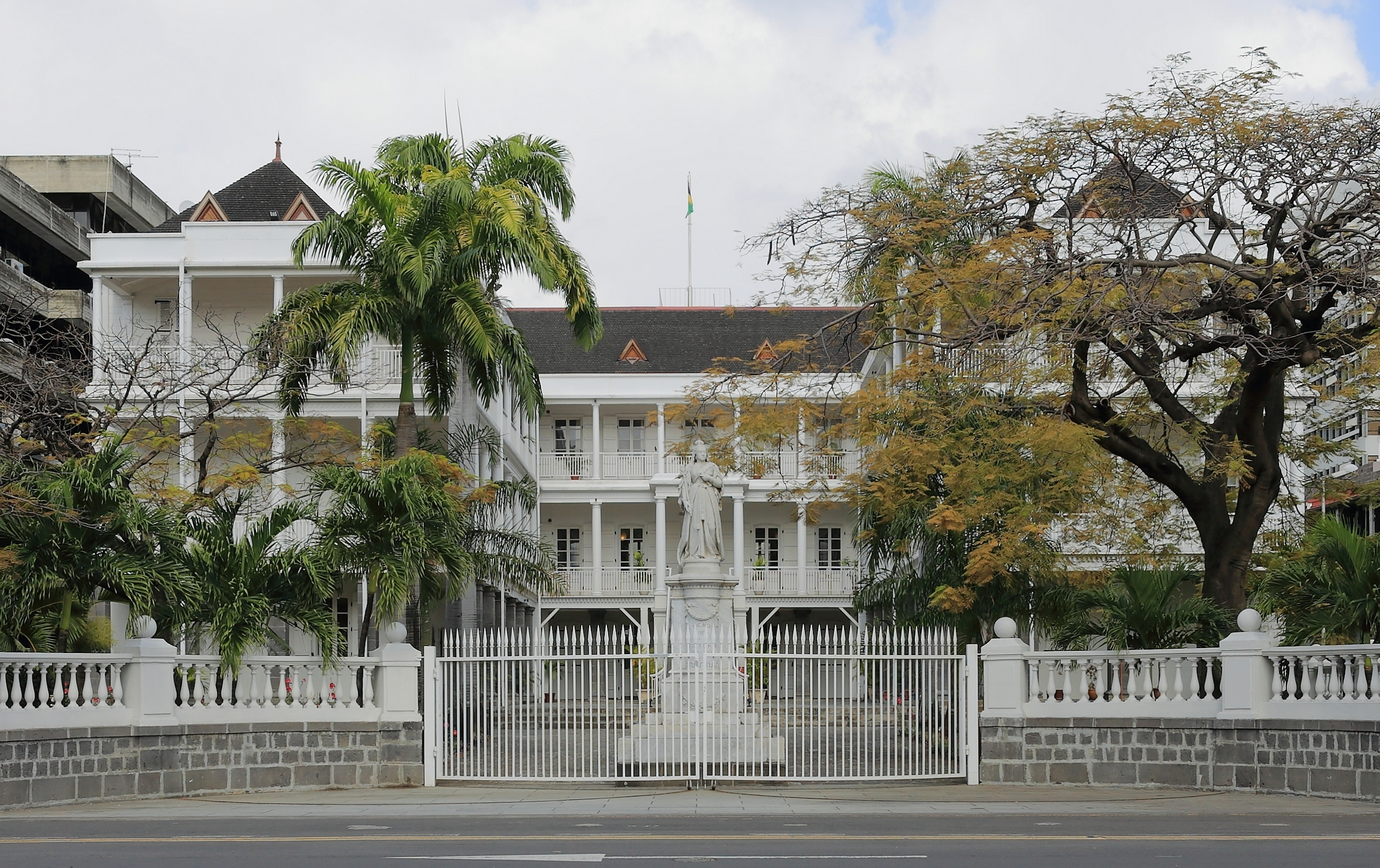
Government House, built in 1738

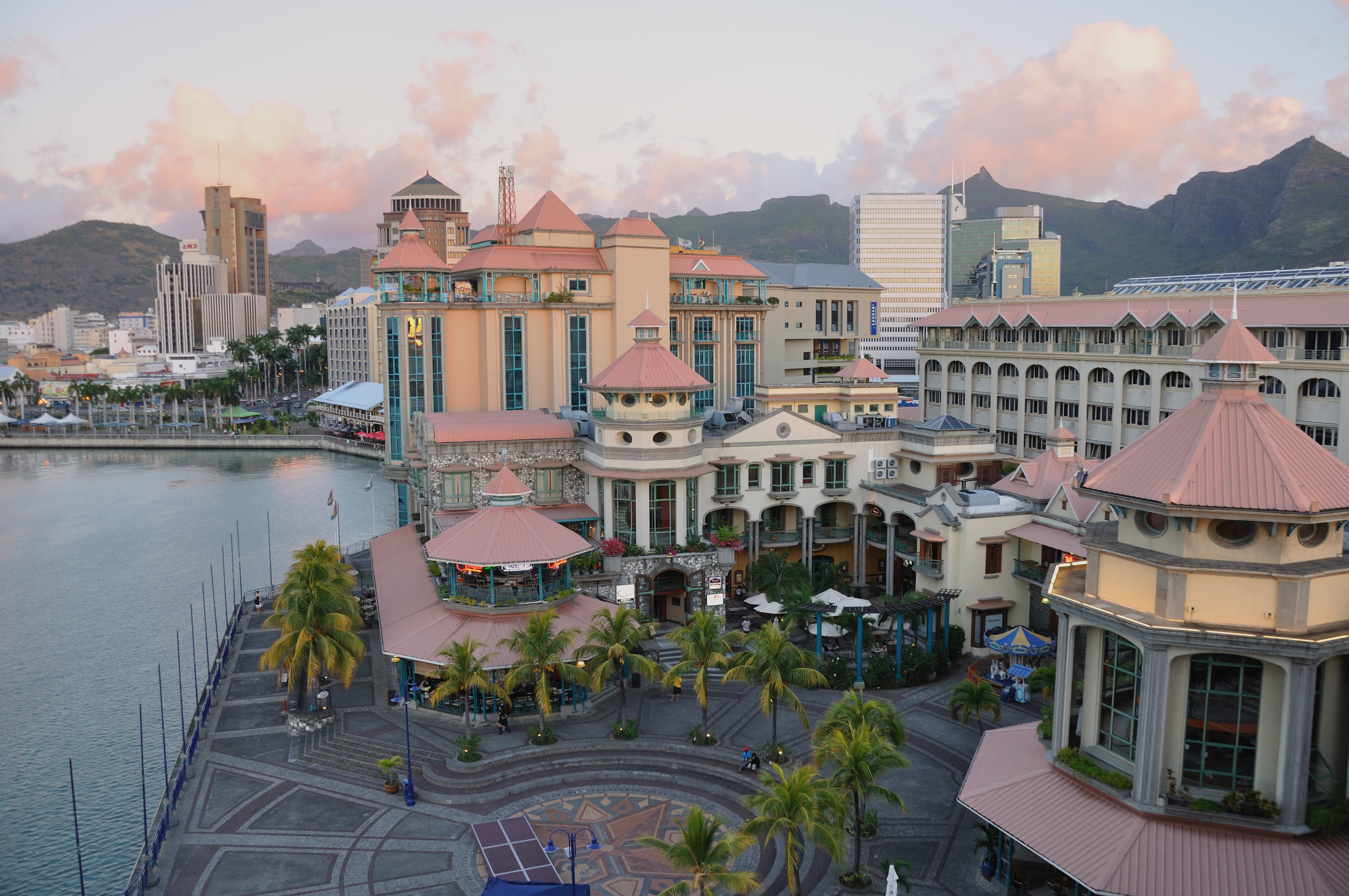
The Caudan Waterfront, commercial development in Port Louis

The city is full of numerous buildings and monuments that reflect its rich and diverse colonial history. Near the city centre, there are several French colonial buildings that date to the 18th century, including the Government House. Other prominent traditional elements include the Jummah Mosque, the majestic English Saint James Cathedral, the Indian Tamil Temple, the elegant five-tier colonial Port Louis Theatre (Théâtre de Port-Louis), the Champ de Mars Racecourse, and the nearby Chinese Pagoda. Also present are some typical houses from past eras, which are mostly wooden structures with shuttered windows and large porches. However, many historic buildings are in a poor state of repair and are being quickly replaced with homes and commercial structures constructed from more durable but less sustainable materials such as concrete, and the city now includes many glass/concrete high-rises.

== Culture ==
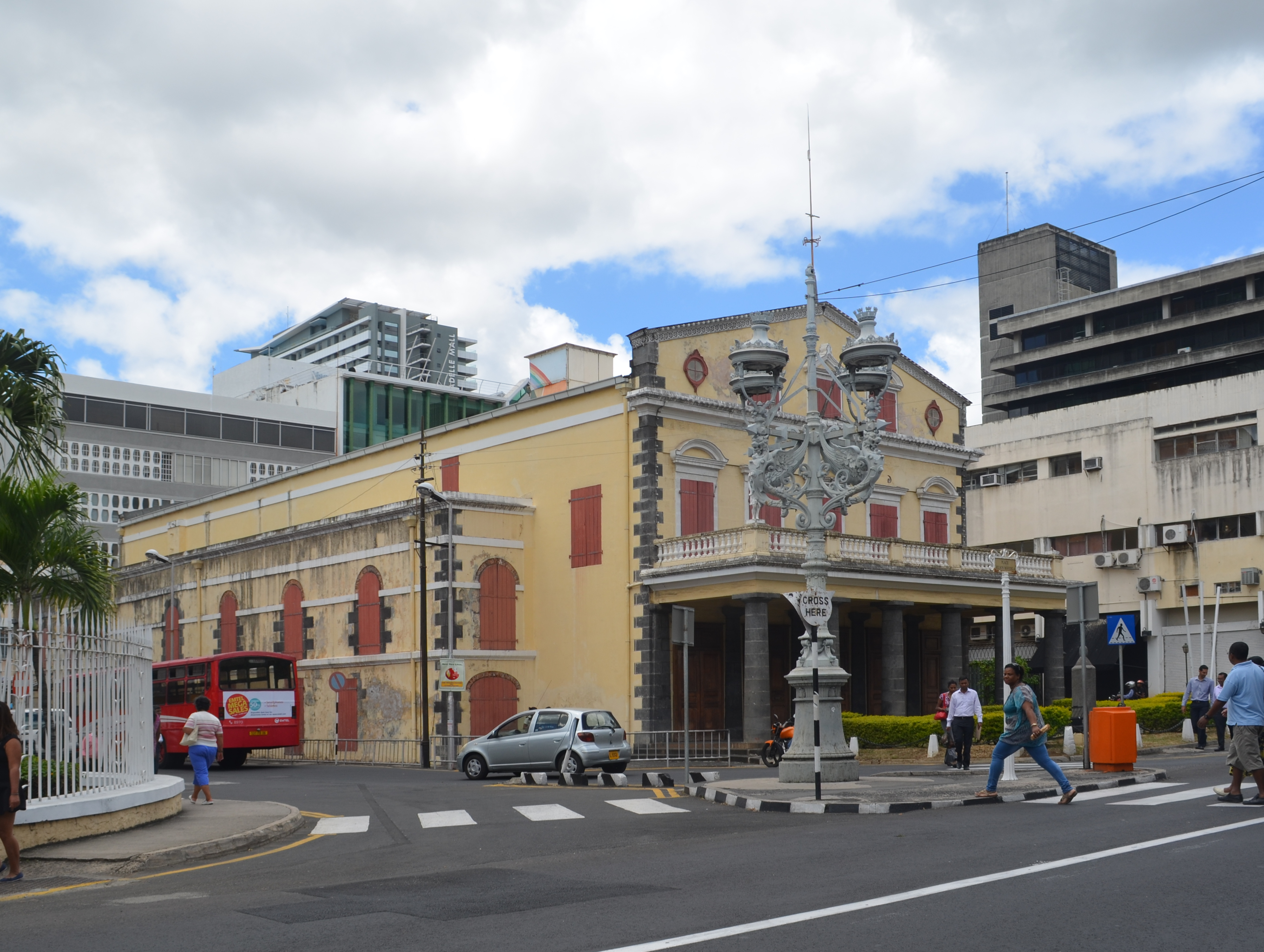
Port Louis Theatre

Port Louis has been a cultural city attracting painters, poets, sculptors, and writers for centuries. Marie-Thérèse Humbert wrote her novel, La Montagne des Signaux, with Port-Louis in mind. Malcolm de Chazal was a Mauritian writer and painter who was often seen in the capital, mostly at the central market, Champ de Mars and l'hôtel National. Robert Edouard-Hart, a poet, found in this city a source of inspiration. Port-Louis-born poet and semiologist Khal Torabully, a poet of indenture and coolitude, recently designed Travellers' Lane at the Jardin de la Compagnie, inaugurated by Navin Ramgoolam, the Mauritian prime minister and the Parcours Culturel with aphorisms of Malcolm de Chazal, just facing the Port Louis Theatre. That theater, still in use and catering mostly to presentations of classical music, jazz, and local drama, has a history that includes the first presentation of opera on the island in the 19th century by travelling European troupes.

More modern entertainment facilities in Port Louis include several cinemas, in which most films are presented in French and English. Recently opened in Paille, a suburb of Port Louis, is the ultra-modern Swami Vivekananda International Convention Centre. It is the first such facility in Mauritius and is used to house conventions, concerts, trade shows, and exhibitions. English is currently the official language of Port Louis and Mauritius.

=== Museums ===
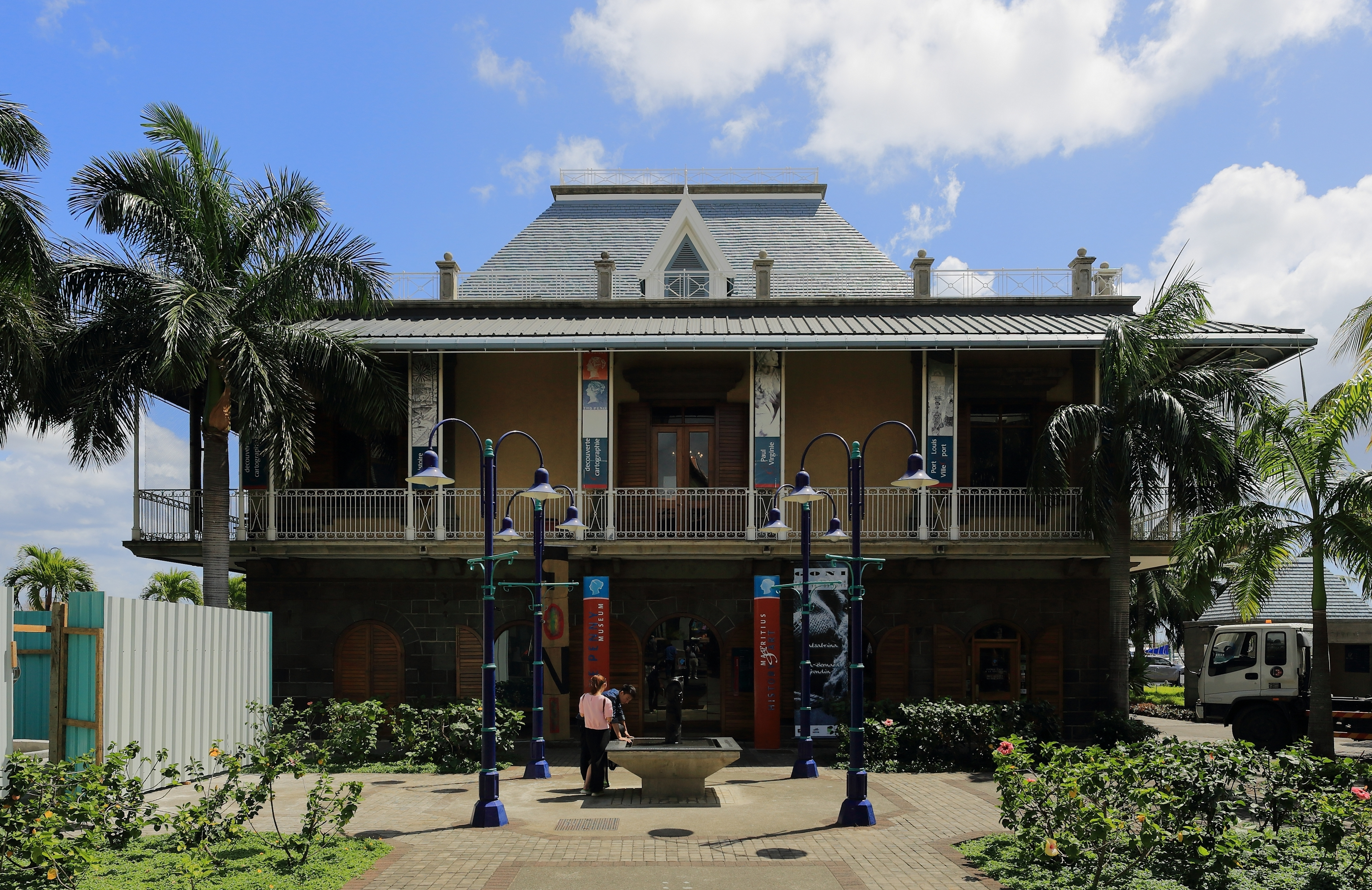
Blue Penny Museum

The Blue Penny Museum is located at the Caudan Waterfront, and is dedicated to the history and art of the island. Its collection includes antique marine maps, paintings, sculptures, engravings, and stamps, including examples of the famous orange-red one penny and deep blue two-pence stamps. The Natural History Museum of Port Louis houses exhibits of the impressive fauna of Mauritius, with a gallery devoted to birds and terrestrial animals, a second focusing on marine species, and a third focused on the dodo, the famous Mauritian bird which became extinct during the Dutch occupation.

The Mauritius Postal Museum is housed in an old stone building that dates to the 18th century, and houses displays of stamps and postal paraphernalia from Mauritius and around the world. The Mauritius Photography Museum, located in a small 18th-century white-washed French colonial building, is a private museum that displays artifacts and documents about Mauritian photography and the early days of cinematography.

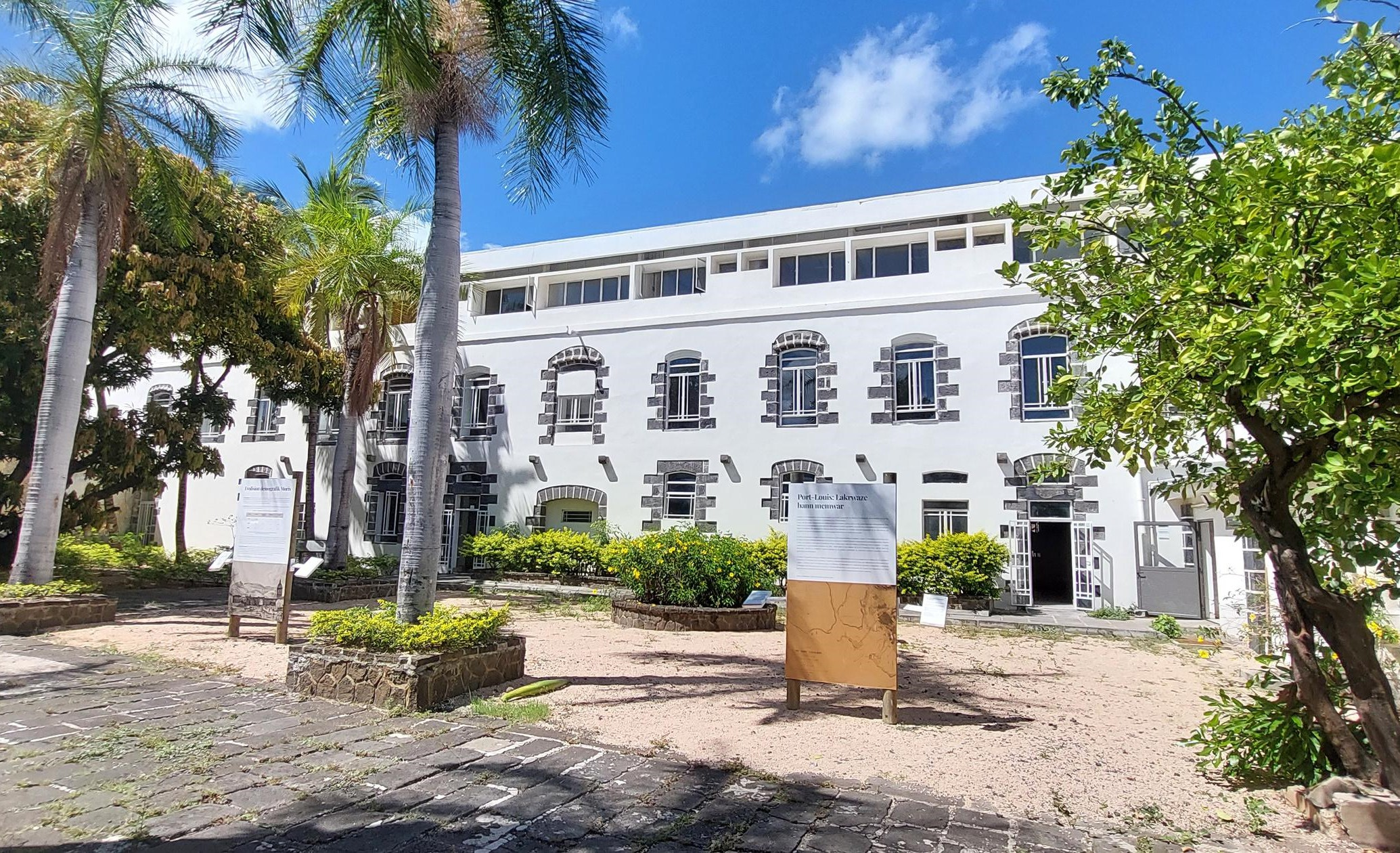
The Intercontinental Slavery Museum

Located in the Ex-Military Hospital, the Intercontinental Slavery Museum deals with the history of the slave trade, slavery and indentured labour. It also houses a documentation centre. The Aapravasi Ghat is the remains of the immigration depot that was built by the British Government to import labourers from India, Eastern Africa, Madagascar, China, and Southeast Asia to work on the island's sugar estates. Although not a museum in a traditional sense, the National Library of Mauritius houses a rich and comprehensive collection of material related to Mauritius history, including manuscripts, books, newspapers, periodicals, music scores, photographs, maps, drawings, and other graphic art forms and audiovisual materials, in addition to providing the traditional services of a library to residents of the city and nation.

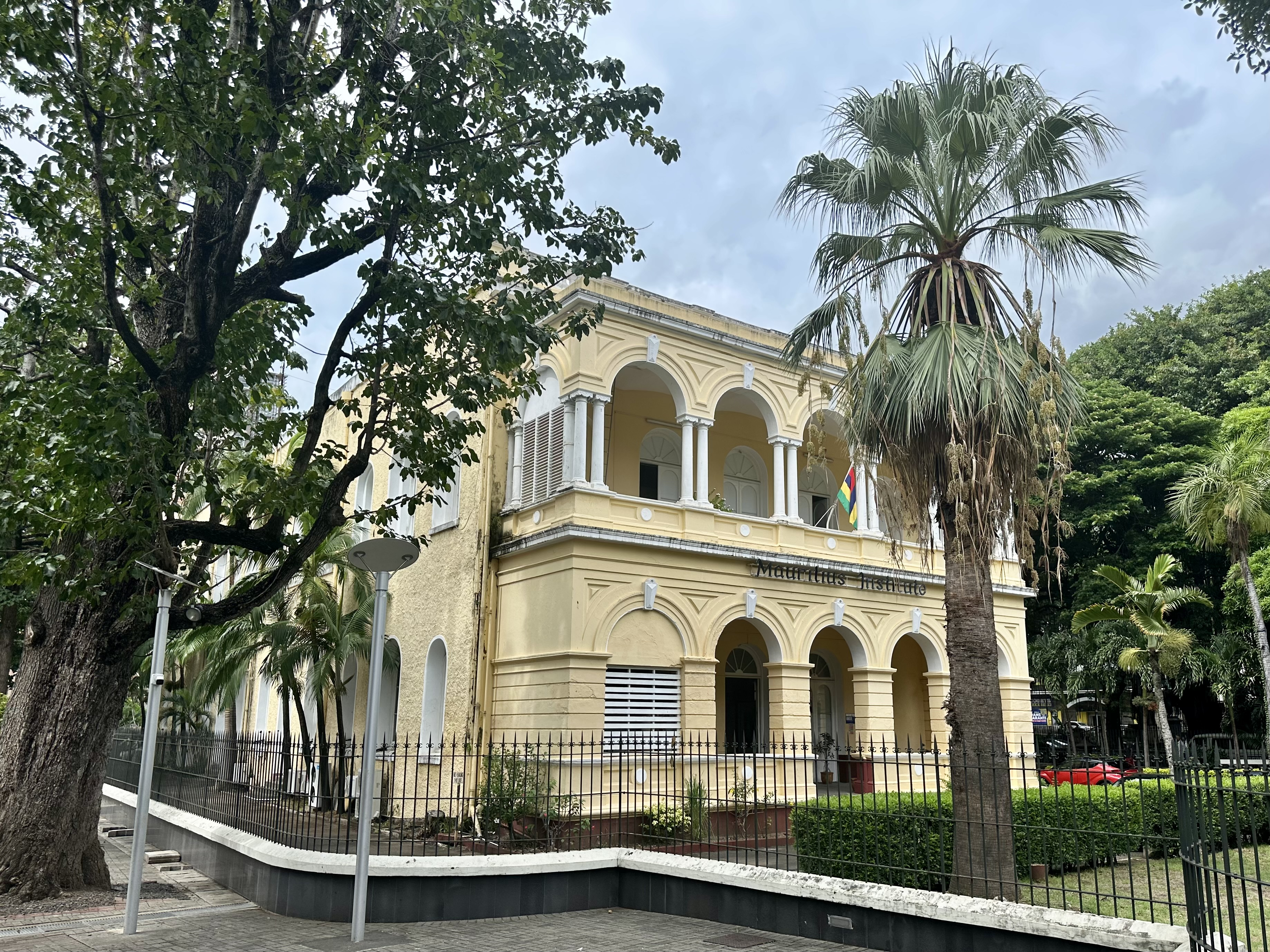
Port Louis, Mauritius, Natural History Museum

== Places of worship ==
The most common places of worship in Mauritius are Hindu temples. There are also Christian churches and temples: Roman Catholic Diocese of Port-Louis (Catholic Church), Church of the Province of the Indian Ocean (Anglican Communion), Diocese of Southern Africa (Russian Orthodox Church), Assemblies of God and Muslim mosques.

== Sports ==
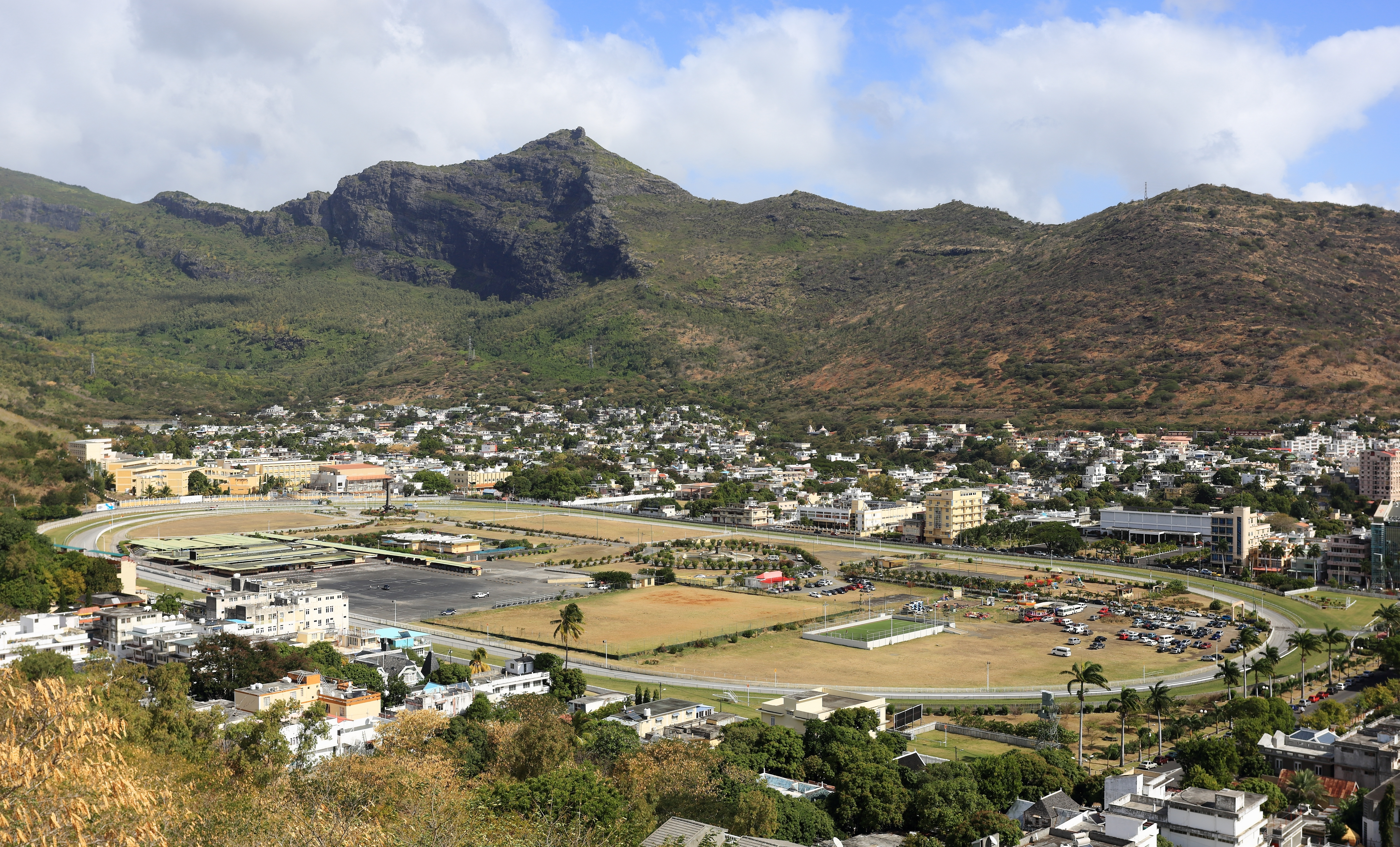
The Champ de Mars Racecourse in Port Louis

Sports are popular among the inhabitants of Port Louis, as in the rest of Mauritius. Over 35 sports federations are organized under the aegis of the Mauritius Sports Council. Popular activities include football, volleyball, a range of martial arts (Karate, Taekwon Do, Wushu), table tennis, badminton, and pétanque, which is a form of boules. The Mauritius National Olympic committee is also based in Port Louis. Public sports facilities in Port Louis include St. François Xavier stadium, which is used for football. There is however a general dearth of public facilities in Port Louis proper, with most being built in the surrounding less-densely inhabited suburbs and districts.

Football clubs are organized nationwide by the Mauritius Football Association, which currently has ten teams in its Premier League. This includes the Port Louis team, named the Association Sportive Port-Louis 2000 (AS Port-Louis 2000), which won the national championship in 2003, 2004, 2005 and 2011.

Another popular sports activity in Port Louis is the Thoroughbred horse races held at the Champ de Mars Racecourse, which is the second oldest horse race track in the world. Gambling on the horse races can be done both with bookies and the tote, available at multiple locations inside the grandstand.

Gambling, in general, is a popular "sport" in Port Louis. Besides the racecourse, within Port Louis gambling can be done in four casinos that offer table games plus gaming, slot, and video poker machines. Port Louis includes the largest casino in the entire country of Mauritius, the Caudan Waterfront Casino at Labourdonnais Waterfront Hotel. Other casinos are the Le Grand Casino du Domaine, L'Amicale Casino, and the Senator Club.

== Twin towns – sister cities ==
Port Louis is twinned with:

- Alexandria, Egypt
- Antsiranana, Madagascar
- Dakar, Senegal
- Doha, Qatar
- Foshan, China
- Karachi, Pakistan
- La Possession, Réunion, France
- Lamentin, Guadeloupe, France
- Maputo, Mozambique
- Port Mathurin, Rodrigues, Mauritius
- Pretoria, South Africa
- Saint-Malo, France

== Notable people ==
- Élysée Aviragnet (1828–1908), professor of literature and music
- Eugénie Poujade (1814–1881), writer and poet

== See also ==
- List of places in Mauritius
- Port Louis District
- World Hindi Secretariat
