= Reform Party (Mauritius) =

Mauritian Political Party

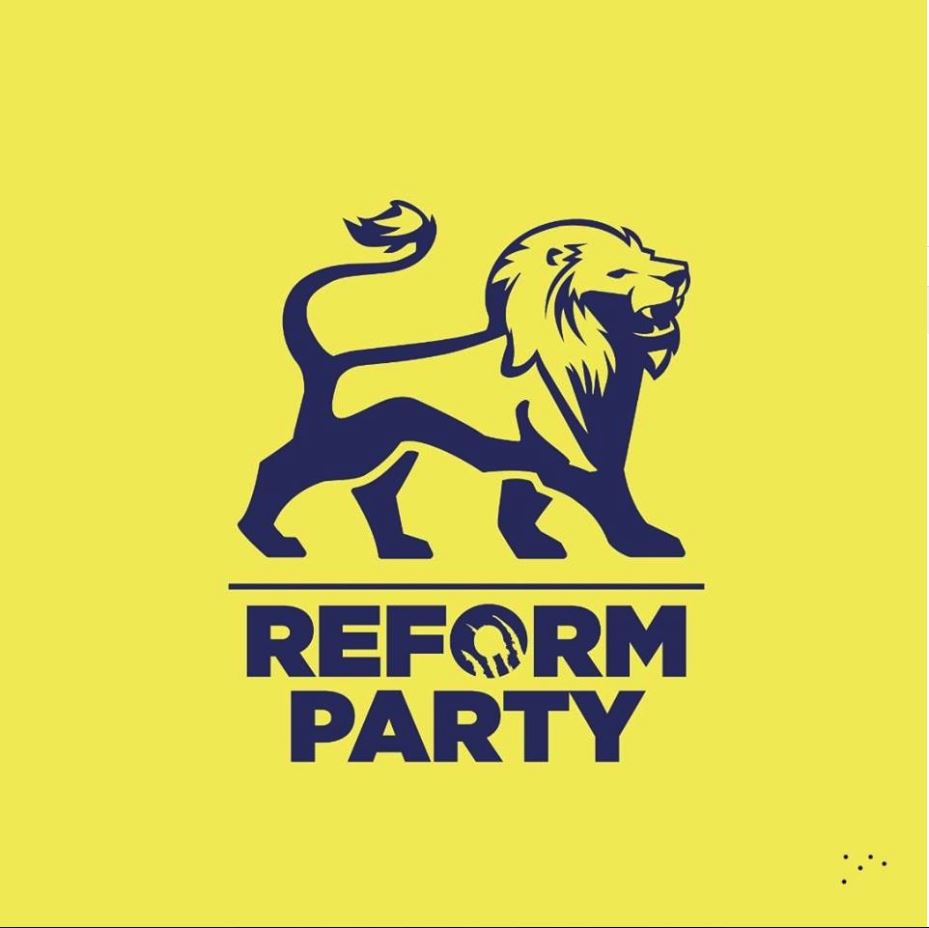
- Reform Party (Mauritius) Official Logo
- Abbreviation: RP
- Leader: Roshi Bhadain
- Founder: Roshi Bhadain
- Founded: 27 January 2017
- Headquarters: Beau Bassin
- Ideology: Reformism
- Political position: Centre-Right
- Colors: Yellow
- National Assembly: 0 / 66

Website
- https://reformparty.tv/

The Reform Party (French: Parti Réformiste) is a political party in Mauritius. The party is led by Roshi Bhadain, who had resigned from the parliament on the 23 June 2017, to bring in a new change in the Mauritian political arena.

== Policies ==
=== 1. Limited and Accountable Government ===
- Impose a fixed, limited mandate for the Prime Minister.
- Reduce the size of government by limiting the number of ministries and ministers.
- Promote transparency, efficiency, and accountability in public service.
- Election of the President of the Republic by the people
- Introduce Midterm elections

=== 2. Free Market and Fiscal Discipline ===
- Champion limited government intervention in the economy.
- Foster a dynamic private sector through deregulation, entrepreneurship support, and pro-business policies.
- Enforce fiscal responsibility: lower taxes, reduced public spending, and a legislated debt ceiling with a 15-year debt reduction plan.

=== 3. Food Security and Self-Reliance ===
- Invest heavily in local agriculture to boost food production.
- Reduce dependence on food imports and aim for national food self-sufficiency.

=== 4. Law, Order, and National Security ===
- Strengthen policing and national security infrastructure.
- Improve and renovate police force
- Maintain law and social order to ensure safety and stability for all citizens.

=== 5. Empowered Citizens ===
- Emphasize individual liberty balanced with social responsibility.
- Promote self-reliance and personal accountability.
- Encourage youth development through alternative career paths (entrepreneurship, sports, music).
- Establish job centers nationwide to match skills with opportunities.

=== 6. Civic Engagement and Environmental Responsibility ===
- Launch national service programs, such as planting 500,000 trees over 5 years and organizing regular cleaning campaigns.
- Promote a culture of civic duty and community participation.

=== 7. Media Freedom and Pluralism ===
- Uphold freedom of the press and expression.
- Encourage the growth of private media (TV, radio, and digital)
- Defund or restructure state media (MBC) to promote independence and reduce government bias.

== Linion Reform Coalition ==
During the Mauritius General elections 2024, The Reform Party (Mauritius) formed the Linion Reform coalition together with the Linion Moris alliance which comprises the following political parties: GREA, 100% Citoyens, Mouvement Patriotique, Rassemblement Mauricien, Les Verts Fraternels, Ralliement Citoyen Pour la Patrie, En Avant Moris, Parti Justice Sociale, Parti Justice et vérité.

Candidates of Linion Reform at the 2024 Mauritian general election were:

Constituency	Candidate 1	Candidate 2	Candidate 3
No. 1 (GRNO/Port-Louis Ouest)	Jean claude Barbier	Dr Didier Michel	Ivor Tan Yan
No. 2 (Port-Louis Sud/Port-Louis Centre)	Bashir Jahangeer	Raouf Khodabaccus	Olivier Maigre
No. 3 (Port-Louis Maritime/Port-Louis Est	Warren Malépa	Ferhat Abass Mamode	Muhammad Husayn Mangalkhan
No. 4 (Port-Louis Nord/Montagne-Longue)	Dr Sylvia Edouard	Christianne Jean-Pierre	Satish Ramruttun
No. 5 (Pamplemousses/Triolet)	Jeeanmotee Tooreea (Asha) Guness	Salonee Devi Seewoobudul	Soondress TEELUCK (Robin)
No. 6 (Grand-Baie/Poudre d'Or)	Yanesh Puryag	Akilesh Mangar	Sylvio Legallant
No. 7 (Piton/Rivière-du-Rempart)	Tevin Nundloll (Vinesh)	Yugeshware Ramdoyal (Ashwan)	Padma Utchanah
No. 8 (Quartier-Militaire/Moka)	Domun Muhammad Sajjid	Paniken Dil Levee (Gemini)	SOBURRUN Prasan Kumar (Vishal)
No. 9 (Flacq/Bon-Accueil)	Dharmanand Chukowa	Mahen Saulick	Khevan Yash Kawal
No. 10 (Montagne-Blanche/GRSE)	Chris Philippe	Ramrajsingh Buskalowa (Deepak)	Rahul Omkar BHASIN
No. 11 (Vieux-Grand-Port/Rose-Belle)	Kailash Satyawan Trilochun	Oomduth (Rajiv) Lallsa	Dr Sita Jeeneea
No. 12 (Mahébourg/Plaine-Magnien)	Cliff Grenade	Roopesh (Kunal) Hoseneea	Awadhkoomarsing Balluck
No. 13 (Rivière-des-Anguilles/Souillac)	Satish Boabul	Preetam Rambaruth	Irshaad Ramjane
No. 14 (Savanne/Rivière-Noire)	Seewajee Coocaram (Luv)	Michele D’Autriche -Dulthummon	Anand Nunkoo
No. 15 (La Caverne/Phœnix)	Kalinka Bologna-Lisis	Thelma Maharaullee	Kamini Lutchmenarraidoo (Surat)
No. 16 (Vacoas/Floréal)	Nando Bodha	Patrick Philogene	Siven Chinien
No. 17 (Curepipe/Midlands)	Dr Sheila Bunwaree	Mirella Chauvin	Louis José Gaëtan Moïrt
No. 18 (Belle-Rose/Quatre-Bornes)	Dr Neena Ramdenee	Kirti Ramdin Kirti Lutchmeeparsad RAMDIN	Vishwadev (Dev) Sunnasy
No. 19 (Stanley/Rose-Hill)	Patrick Belcourt	Rama Valayden	Dr Daniella Police-Michel
No. 20 (Beau-Bassin/Petite-Rivière)	Geraldine Geoffroy	Ryad Subratty	Roshi Bhadain
