= Corruption in Mauritius =

Corruption in Mauritius follows the familiar patterns of state-based corruption, namely government officials abusing their political powers for private gain in the country of Mauritius.

Some Mauritians have taken advantage of the government's corruption. In the local dialect, those who adopt such means are called traceurs or magouilleurs. Familiar methods include falsifying home addresses to get a child into a perceived "star school" or bribing officials to obtain a driver's license.

On 28 May 1979, Member of Parliament Harish Boodhoo called for a general mobilization against corruption in a mass meeting that drew 35,000 people. Cables leaked from the US embassy in 2008 described corruption in Mauritius as "pervasive and ingrained". In May 2020, the European Commission identified Mauritius as a high-risk country, with strategic deficiencies in its anti-money-laundering and counter-terrorism-financing regime. According to a former US ambassador to Mauritius, the Mauritian-based Independent Commission Against Corruption (ICAC) has lost its credibility.

According to Transparency International's 2025 Corruption Perceptions Index, Mauritius scored 48 on a scale from 0 ("highly corrupt") to 100 ("very clean"). When ranked by score, Mauritius ranked 61st among the 182 countries in the Index, where the country ranked first is perceived to have the most honest public sector. For comparison with regional scores, the best score among sub-Saharan African countries (Note: Angola, Benin, Botswana, Burkina Faso, Burundi, Cameroon, Cape Verde, Central African Republic, Chad, Comoros, Côte d'Ivoire, Democratic Republic of the Congo, Djibouti, Equatorial Guinea, Eritrea, Eswatini, Ethiopia, Gabon, Gambia, Ghana, Guinea, Guinea-Bissau, Kenya, Lesotho, Liberia, Madagascar, Malawi, Mali, Mauritania, Mauritius, Mozambique, Namibia, Niger, Nigeria, Republic of the Congo, Rwanda, Sao Tome and Principe, Senegal, Seychelles, Sierra Leone, Somalia, South Africa, South Sudan, Sudan, Tanzania, Togo, Uganda, Zambia, and Zimbabwe.) was 68, the average was 32 and the worst was 9. For comparison with worldwide scores, the best score was 89 (ranked 1), the average was 42, and the worst was 9 (ranked 181, in a two-way tie).

== Nepotism ==
Nepotism is common in Mauritian politics, with many relatives and friends of high-ranking politicians being appointed to high-ranking positions and associated companies being granted government contracts.

Since the first democratic elections in 1948, the field of politics in Mauritius has been marked by a handful of families who have controlled the four major political parties which exist to this day. They are often referred to as the "modern dynasties" of Mauritian politics such as the Duval, Gunowa (Gungah), Bérenger, Curé, Uteem, Mohamed, Boolell, Ramgoolam and Jugnauth families. The Boolell family's involvement in politics started with Satcam Boolell in 1955, paving the way for his son Arvin Boolell, nephews Satish Boolell, Anil Gayan, and Sanjay Bhuckory, and son-in-law Sushil Kushiram to enter politics. The Duval dynasty started with ex-Lord mayor and minister Gaetan Duval, followed by his son Xavier, adopted son Richard as well as grandson Adrien. Lall Jugnauth was the first of his clan to enter politics in the 1950s and was followed by his cousins Aneerood and Ashock as well as his nephew Pravind. Abdool Razack Mohamed, who migrated from India in the 1930s, became Lord Mayor and minister; his son Yousuf and grandson Shakeel were also elected and served as ministers. Roshi Bhadain, who was a minister of the MSM government, is the nephew of former Labour Party minister Vasant Bunwaree. Roshi Bhadain and Akilesh Deerpalsing (Bhadain's advisor and campaign manager, who is also the son of former minister Kishore Deerpalsing), were investigated by ICAC in 2019 for suspicious recruitment practices when he was a minister.

In March 2020 Harry Ganoo, the retired brother of Minister Alan Ganoo, was nominated as the new president du Civil Service College Mauritius a few months after the November 2019 General Elections.

Until mid-2020, construction company PAD & Co. Ltd was awarded a string of major contracts such as constructing the new airport control tower, a new weather radar at Trou aux Cerfs, renovating the Bank of Mauritius, rehabilitating the coastline of Cap Malheureux, renovating the Port Louis waterfront, upgrading roads, constructing the Harbour Cruise Terminal in Port Louis for the Mauritius Port Authority, and upgrading the navigation channels at Port Mathurin, Pointe La Gueule, and Baie aux Huîtres in Rodrigues, among other projects. PAD & Co. Ltd's owner, Alain Hao Thyn Voon, is the son of Philippe Hao Thyn Voon, president of the Olympic Committee, with close ties to the MSM. Following the St Louis gate scandal and the discovery of fake bank guarantees, PAD & Co. Ltd went under voluntary administration.

In June 2020, MP Eshan Juman revealed details of a contract between the Ministry of Land and Housing and a private firm called Smart Clinics Ltd. The firm is partly owned by MSM Parliamentary Private Secretary Ismaël Rawoo and his family. The contract was a lease of 60 years on 2 acres of prime beachfront state-owned land in Grande Rivière Noire, in the exclusive precinct of Tamarin in Black River. As part of the deal, Rawoo's family will acquire the lease for Rs 15.05 million and will sell the lease for Rs 250 million, generating a profit of around Rs 235 million.

In August 2020, V. Gobin, a 75-year-old retired schoolteacher and father of Attorney General Maneesh Gobin, was nominated as Chairman of the Mahatma Gandhi Institute and the Rabindranath Tagore Institute. Maneesh Gobin was elected to Parliament within the ruling MSM government in 2014 and 2019 and his father V. Gobin was elected once in 1987. A week earlier, Rishikesh Hurdoyal, the brother of MSM Minister of Civil Service Vikram Hurdoyal, was nominated as chairman and President of the Mauritius Shipping Corporation Ltd, in addition to being a director of the State Bank of Mauritius. The new nomination will allow Rishikesh Hurdoyal to receive an extra Rs 54,540 per month, as well as an additional Rs 10,125 per month as entertainment allowance, with access to a chauffeured company car with 245 litres of fuel per month.

=== Nepotism under Anerood Jugnauth ===
In May 1992, the Bank of Mauritius issued a Rs 20 note which featured the portrait of Sarojini Jugnauth, wife of Prime Minister Anerood Jugnauth. The portrait was considered to be a birthday gift from Anerood to his wife. This developed into a major controversy, which led to Anerood confirming in parliament that he had approved the issue of the new note. He apologised to the population and stated he would not commit such a mistake in the future.

Despite her defeat in the 2014 general elections, Maya Hanoomanjee became Speaker of the National Assembly, Sarojini Jugnauth's niece. In 2015, Maya's daughter Naila was appointed to the newly created position of CEO of the State Property Development Company. In 2018, she was also appointed as CEO of Landscope Mauritius, another state-owned corporation. Maya's other daughter, Sheila, was involved in a 2017 controversy, when it was revealed that her company was allocated the contract to supply biscuits to various state-owned organisations and municipal councils. The tins had misleading labels that read "Made in UK" when in fact they were produced by a local Mauritian baker.

In December 2015 Rita Venkatasawmy, niece of Sarojini Jugnauth, was nominated as the Ombudsman For Children despite having no qualifications in the judiciary. Her predecessor Vidya Narayen was a retired judge who held the position from 2011. Prior to Judge Vidya Narayen, the position was held from 2003 to 2011 by lawyer Shirin Aumeeruddy-Cziffra.

Soon after the retirement of Satyaved Seebaluck in 2016, Prime Minister Aneerood Jugnauth nominated his close relative Nayen Koomar Ballah as Head of the Civil Service and Secretary to Cabinet. Nayen Ballah is the cousin of Sarojini Jugnauth. In March 2018, Ballah was decorated with the title of Grand Order of the Star and Key of the Indian Ocean.

In 2017, several opposition MPs raised questions in the National Assembly about the business dealings of MSM Minister of Technology Yogida Sawmynaden's wife Wenda. It was revealed that the buyer of controversial clinic Apollo Bramwell had been pressured to use the services of notary public Wenda Sawmynaden, Yogida's wife. The private clinic had been valued at Rs 2 billion but was sold for only Rs 77 million. Despite the conflict of interest, Wenda pocketed fees worth Rs 7 million. In another instance, political pressure was applied for SIT Property Development Ltd to host an emergency meeting for Wenda to be made the preferred notary public regarding the sale of parcels of prime real estate within a new gated community at Côte-d'Or. Wenda's brother Harry Krishna Vydelingum was also appointed as president of the Mauritius Institute of Training and Development following a failed attempt to make him part of the management board of Mauritius Post. Wenda was also allocated various contracts by various state-run corporations, such as NHDC, the Mauritius House Company, SICOM, the Sugar Investment Trust, the Sugar Industry Pension Fund Board, and various banks.

=== Nepotism under Navin Ramgoolam ===
Following the electoral defeat of the Labour Party in 2014, ex-Prime Minister Navin Ramgoolam was arrested on suspicions of money laundering and conspiracy. A police raid of his house exposed several safes containing brand new banknotes to the value of Rs 220 million rupees, exclusive credit cards and prescription medication tablets. His girlfriend Nandanee Oogarah-Soornack, accompanied by their 5-year-old illegitimate daughter Xara, had escaped Mauritius to her castle in Italy a day before the proclamation of election results with an estimated Rs 800 million rupees. Attempts to extradite her back to Mauritius failed. Nandanee's rapid accumulation of wealth with the help of Ramgoolam was closely examined by the press and investigators, and it was revealed how she collected million of rupees through companies set up as monopolies of food outlets at Sir Seewoosagur Ramgoolam International Airport.

After the December 2014 elections, the new government instigated criminal proceedings to recover about 1,000 acres (1,150 arpents) of state-owned land which had been allocated to the activists and allies of Ramgoolam under his Labour government since 2005. The principal recipients of the various lots of Crown land ranged from Labour activists to associates to corporations, and the land was used for varying purposes including resorts, restaurants, and houses. One recipient of the land, Sandranee Ramjoorawon's husband Rajiv Beeharry, was a trusted adviser of Navin Ramgoolam and was appointed as CEO of the state-owned MauBank. Labour Party Treasurer Deva Virahsawmy's company Midas Acropolis was also granted 31 arpents of Crown land at St-Félix after the Labour government cancelled the development permit previously awarded to a businessman from Réunion Island. Prior to the December 2014 elections, the ministry held by Deva Virahsawmy approved the Environment Impact Assessment for land clearing of the 31 arpents in preparation of the development of a new hotel. Within the harbour precinct, state land was granted to Beta Cement, owned by Veekram Bhunjun, a relative of ex-minister Rajesh Jeetah. Bhunjun was also awarded 12.5 arpents at Petite-Rivière-Noire via his company Western Marina.

In 2008, a private company called Pride Bridge Limited was formed by Nandanee Soornack's father and his associates. Pride Bridge Ltd was soon granted 30 arpents of pas géométriques state-owned land at Poste de Flacq in 2008 for a "mixed development project" against a deposit of Rs 5 million. However, the owners of the well-established estate Constance La Gaité objected to the proposed project by questioning its legality and six years later Soonack's and Chundunsing's company gave up the 30 arpents as Navin Ramgoolam was defeated in the 2014 elections, soon after which Nandanee Soornack fled to Italy.

Ramgoolam's sister Sunita Ramgoolam-Joypaul claimed and received more than Rs 3.1 million from the government as per diem for accompanying the then-PM's wife overseas. One of the visits was in September 2007 when she travelled to New York. Another costly visit was when Sunita Ramgoolam-Joypaul travelled to France in 2008. Veena Ramgoolam claimed and received more than Rs 6 million from the government for accompanying her husband overseas.

== Other cases ==
=== Alex Rima larceny ===
Former trade unionist and PMSD minister Jean Alex Rima faced allegations of larceny during his term as minister of employment. Rima became a minister in 1969 after the Ramgoolam government made a deal with the PMSD after being deserted by former ally IFB. Following a private prosecution on a charge of larceny, Alex Rima was convicted and sentenced. The Court of Appeal then upheld his conviction and sentence, forcing Ramgoolam and Duval to revoke Rima from office. Despite his past conviction Alex Rima was later made Consul of Mauritius in Australia.

=== Ministry of Cooperatives and Ministry of Social Security ===
In 1979, two ministers of the ruling Labour Party government (Badry and Dabee) were dismissed following an enquiry led by Judge Victor Glover into alleged corruption claims. The enquiry was ordered by Mauritius' former prime minister, Sir Seewoosagur Ramgoolam, after being urged to look into the matter by a group of his MLAs headed by Harish Boodhoo.

=== Amsterdam Boys, High Commissioner Soo Soobiah and Gambino drugs syndicate ===
On 18 February 1989, the High Commissioner of Mauritius in Great Britain, the Vatican and West Germany, Soo Soobiah, and his wife Muriel were arrested at their residence in Surrey, England, on charges of disposing of drug proceeds—that is, laundering $670,800 of their son Nigel's drug profits. Nigel Sevan Soobiah (now known as Sivan Subiah) had been tracked for months by the FBI as an international heroin dealer. In addition, he was a key contact for the infamous four Amsterdam boys who had been arrested at Schiphol Airport in December 1985 with 20 kilograms (44 lb) of heroin in their suitcase while travelling under the cover of diplomatic passports. The Amsterdam Boys were four elected members of the Mauritius National Legislative Assembly who formed part of the ruling MSM-PTr-PMSD coalition. They were Serge Thomas, Ismaël Nawoor, Dev Kim Currun, and Sattyanand Pelladoah.

In April 2019 Sivan Subiah made newspaper headlines in Mauritius after he contacted a local newspaper to report a flight mishap. He recalled his arrest at Orchard Park, near Buffalo in New York in December 1988 as part of Operation BUSICO, a 3-year-long inquiry by the Federal Bureau of Investigation (FBI) on international drug trafficking. According to The Buffalo News of 2 December 1988, this investigation led to 200 arrests, including that of Nigel Sevan Soobiah (now known as Sivan Subiah) who claimed to be an antique dealer and the son of a Mauritian diplomat. Sergio Maranghi and Soobiah were identified as the key suspects who helped agents make drug connections from Amsterdam to Rio de Janeiro, Brazil.

=== Sol Kerzner's Passport scandal ===
In 1989, hotel and casino magnate Sol Kerzner acknowledged that in 1986 he had bribed the leader of Transkei, South Africa, George Matanzima, to preserve Sun International's monopoly on gambling licenses there. This revelation became a scandal in Mauritius, where Kerzner had recently opened a hotel along the western coast and had even received a Mauritian passport. In response to MP Arvin Boolell's query, Prime Minister Anerood Jugnauth revealed that MP Ivan Collendavelloo had endorsed Kerzner's citizenship and passport application. Collendavelloo's party, the Mauritian Militant Movement (MMM), which officially opposed the Apartheid regime of South Africa, forced him to resign from Parliament. This triggered by-elections in Constituency No. 15 where Collendavelloo lost his bid for re-election to a political newcomer.

=== Turbine Gate (CEB) ===
The Minister of Energy, Mahen Utchanah, was sacked by the prime minister in 1994 following a scandal involving malpractice during the tendering process to purchase a gas turbine by the Central Electricity Board (CEB), a parastatal organisation. The minister had participated in CEB's decision to grant the contract to a firm, which was going to cost Rs 63,000,000 more than a competitor's offer.

=== Albion Gate Macarena Party ===
During the night of 29 March 1997 and the morning of 30 March 1997, police received complaints from local residents about a noisy party held at a Labour Party political activist's bungalow in the village of Albion. It was further revealed that several young women and even an underage girl had been invited to the Macarena Private Party where they had to dance and undress to the tunes of Los Del Rio's song "Macarena". One of the young women refused to dance and managed to escape from the bungalow where former Prime Minister Navin Ramgoolam and his close associates former MP Iqbal Mallam-Hassam, Air Mauritius executive Nash Mallam-Hassam, Yousoof Jokhoo and optician Farouk Hossen were also partying. Ajay Daby, the lawyer who represented the young women, even brandished black underwear at a public meeting, claiming that it belonged to a well-known politician and had been recovered on Albion Beach. The state's radio station MBC was even banned from airing Los Del Rio's song "Macarena" following Navin Ramgoolam's orders. This scandal dubbed Albion Gate and Affaire Macarena by the local press contributed to the June 1997 break-up of the Labour-MMM coalition.

=== Scandal of Blankets (Affaire Molleton) ===
Following allegations made in 1999 and a subsequent investigation by the now-defunct Economic Crime Office (ECO), the former Labour Party minister of Social Security (Vishnu Bundhun) was handed a six-month jail sentence for bribery. Magistrates Pritviraj Feckna and Shameem Hamuth-Laulloo found Bundhun guilty of requesting bribes during the procurement process for 105,000 blankets donated to pensioners by the government. The then-permanent Secretary of Bundhun's ministry (Bawanydeal Doolhur) confessed that the minister had ordered the collection of a commission of Rs.10 per blanket from Satyam Alleck, the supplier who had been awarded the contract by the Central Tender Board (CTB) at a price of Rs.98 per blanket. During the trial magistrates Feckna and Laulloo received death threats as a form of intimidation.

=== Transfer of state funds to Swiss Bank, illegal weapons and Église Chrétienne extremists ===
Xavier-Luc Duval's advisor Éric Stauffer made revelations to the local press on 22 March 2000 about the transfer of large amounts of state funds to a Swiss bank account. Éric Stauffer also described how he also bought and shipped 3 firearms from Geneva to Mauritius in preparation for Xavier-Luc Duval's 1999 General Elections campaign. Stauffer stated that Duval managed to organise clearance of the illegal firearms by Mauritian customs. Éric Stauffer also revealed that then Minister of Commerce Xavier-Luc Duval spent public taxpayers' funds to pay for international tourist trips during which Duval and his mistress Carole Hardy travelled to the Alps. Carole Hardy, the daughter of Miki Hardy, leader of the religious sect Église Chrétienne, was also employed by Xavier-Luc Duval as his Communications Adviser. Mauritian authorities suspected Église Chrétienne to be also involved in child kidnappings. As a result, Éric Stauffer could not return to Mauritius as he feared that Duval's partner Navin Ramgoolam would organise his arrest.

=== Illovo Deal ===
Soon after the sale of Lonhro's and Illovo's sugar estates and factories in Mauritius the original Illovo Deal was conceived in 2001 in order to transfer ownership of these assets with the government's intervention. However, this eventually resulted in the sale of the factories and large parcels of agricultural land to the detriment of Mauritian small planters and taxpayers, whereas a conglomerate of companies headed by a few Franco-Mauritian businessmen received the most lucrative portion of the assets. Members of the ruling MSM-MMM government (headed by Anerood Jugnauth and Paul Bérenger) modified the original deal, which would have allowed a large share of ownership to be transferred to Mauritian small planters and taxpayers, in order to heavily favour the Franco-Mauritian conglomerate.

=== Economic Crime Office (ECO) and Independent Commission Against Corruption (ICAC) ===
In December 2001, the Economic Crime Office (ECO) was dismantled amid investigations of alleged corruption involving ministers and allies of the ruling MSM-MMM (Militant Socialist Movement – Mauritian Militant Movement) government and the past CEO of Air Mauritius, Sir Harry Tirvengadum. The latter had illegally tried to appropriate State Land located next to his property in Floreal in cahoots with then-Minister Jayen Cuttaree. A similar organisation soon replaced the ECO but with reduced power—the Independent Commission Against Corruption (ICAC). In 2015, an arrest warrant issued for the director of public prosecutions sparked a debate about the impartiality of the government's anti-corruption campaign. A board member of the ICAC handed in her resignation, claiming that the institution was in the process of going against the country's democratic principles, apparently implying that the commission was not acting independently. In 2006, ICAC initiated an investigation to dismantle a network of University of Mauritius lecturers moonlighting at other universities.

=== Caisse Noire Affair (Air Mauritius) ===
In 2002, Sir Harry Tirvengadum and other officials of Air Mauritius and Rogers Limited were arrested and prosecuted following revelations of illegal financial practices which came to be known as the Caisse Noire Affair. Gérard Tyack, an Air Mauritius official, revealed the existence of a Swiss bank account in Geneva used for payments to officials of private companies, journalists, politicians, political newspapers, and electoral campaigns. The account was also used to bankroll the purchase of private cars for Sir Harry's wife and their daughters' overseas studies. This started in 1981 when then-prime minister Sir Seewoosagur Ramgoolam needed money to save the Labour party's political newspaper, Advance, from bankruptcy. The investigation (carried out with Air Mauritius) revealed that nearly Rs 85 million had been used as a special commission. Gérard Tyack spent two years in jail; Robert Rivalland of Rogers Limited was acquitted in 2015 after being sentenced to six months in prison in 2008 for complicity. Prosecution against Sir Harry Tirvengadum was halted because of his ill health.

=== MCB-NPF scandal (stolen Rs 886.1 million) ===
On 14 February 2003, when Paul Bérenger was finance minister, L’affaire MCB-NPF was made public after Ameenah Rojoa (principal accounting officer) of the Ministry of Social Security (MSS) reported that Rs 60 million was missing from the bank accounts of the National Pensions Fund (NPF) and the National Savings Fund (NSF) held at the Mauritius Commercial Bank (MCB). Most of the embezzlement of funds occurred when Navin Ramgoolam led various alliances in government. The NPF is where thousands of civil servants and employees deposit savings to prepare for retirement. Soon, investigators established that Rs 886.1 million was missing. Robert Lesage (chief manager of MCB), Pierre Guy Noel (MCB executive), Ameenah Rojoa (NPF MSS accountant), Dev Manraj (NPF secretary), and other executives were arrested on suspicion of their roles in the misappropriation of funds from the MCB and several charges that ranged from money laundering to tampering with clients' accounts between 1991 and 2002.

Attempts to extradite Teeren Appasamy (mastermind and Mauritian swindler living in the UK) failed. Four years later, Appasamy was arrested by British authorities, but still could not be extradited to Mauritius as he held a British passport. Thierry Sauzier, the senior MCB manager, was charged with accepting a Rs 2 million bribe. A large number of techniques, accounts, and structures controlled by Robert Lesage and his network were uncovered. For more than a decade, Lesage was overriding the MCB's system of controls to extract funds from NPF's fixed deposit funds. Investigators at ICAC established that Teeren Appasamy was the main beneficiary of the embezzled funds which ended up in the accounts of 10 companies and five people:Teeren Appasamy, Ravi Ramdewar (Appasamy's solicitor), Dev Manraj (senior civil servant and director of Appasamy's companies), Donald Ha Yeung (economist and Appasamy's trusted associate) as well as Tamby Appasamy (Teeren Appasamy's brother). MCB initiated legal proceedings against 38 defendants who benefited from the swindled Rs 886.1 million in workers' retirement funds. These included: Sea Rock Paradise Ltd (1989 Ha Yeung couple bought shares of Masilamani and Veemlah Veerasamy); Angel Beach Resorts Ltd (1987 Teeren Appasamy and Dev Manraj; Donald Ha Yeung's wife became a shareholder in 1997), Ravi Ramdewar (secretary until May 2002), Teeren Appasamy and Marc Daruty de Grandpré directors since August 2001), Belle Beach Ltd (Teeren Appasamy, sole director), Handsome Investment Ltd (1991 shareholders Donald Ha Yeung & Pit Ho Wong Ching Hwai), Quartet Development Co Ltd (1986 shareholders Alain Richard Voon, Donald Ha Yeung, Prithiniah Geerjanand, and Mrs Hurkissoon Rambaruth). In 1990, Roshi Bhadain (Sudarshan) and Geerjanand Khoosman also became shareholders of Quartet, Magarian Cie Ltd (1988 shareholders Bhardooaz Babeedin and Deochand Nundloll joined by new shareholder Donald Ha Yeung in 1994), Advance Engineering Ltd (1988 shareholders Narainsamy Sadien, Sudesh Dawoodharry and Danesh Sampathlall), Mauri Beach Travel and Tours Ltd (1997 Dev Manraj (director), Ravi Ramdewar (secretary), Donald Ha Yeung and wife (director) shareholders and Renu Manraj (director)).

In 1991, Lesage started illegally endorsing bills and promissory notes which were discounted with other financial institutions. He disguised the source and audit trail of funds by creating complex layers of financial transactions and by separating the siphoned-off and misappropriated funds from the source. Lesage started to make deposits (Rs 51 million) to Handsome Investment, Quartet Development and Magarian CIE Ltd from 1993 onwards. Although Lesage had retired from MCB in May 2001, he fraudulently handled large amounts of funds associated with NPF, NSF and fixed deposits, especially by offering very generous interest rates to state-run NPF and NSF to entice them to keep renewing their fixed deposits with his former employer MCB. The ICAC accused civil servant Ameenah Rojoa (responsible for the monitoring of NPF deposits) of conspiracy with Lesage, and she was arrested in 2003. Commissioned by the Bank of Mauritius, Singaporean audit firm nTan performed an independent audit and reported in early 2015 that MCB executives and employees had indulged in a long list of unlawful banking practices. NTan also highlighted poor auditing by firms BDO et KPMG. In October 2017, the MCB was found guilty of money laundering following prosecution by the ICAC and was fined Rs 1.8 million.

=== Palmargate ===
In 2003, the Housing and Lands minister, Mukeshwar Choonee, was arrested and charged with conspiracy to accept bribes in a scandal called Palmargate. He resigned after he was arrested and charged by the ICAC with accepting bribes amounting to Rs 4.5 million over a sale of state land. When his initial charges were dismissed in August 2003 due to a technicality related to ICAC's existence, ICAC handed over the case to the Central Criminal Investigation Bureau (CCIB), which arrested and provisionally charged Choonee in November 2003; he was later released after paying bail of Rs 150,000.

=== Cyanide poisoning of chief PTr agent Indur ===
On 21 February 2003, an influential political activist for the Labour Party (PTr) in the northern region, Rajeshwar Indur, died of cyanide poisoning soon after drinking heavily with other members of the Labour Party. A few months before his death, agent Indur was gifted a plot of Crown Land by then Prime Minister Navin Ramgoolam, and Indur quickly resold the property to pocket millions of rupees in windfall. Journalist Vel Moonien believed that Harish Chundunsing was involved in the murder, and that Indur's sudden wealth was connected to his murder. However, Indur's murder remains unsolved and his cash profits from the sale of Crown Land have not been recovered. Another political activist, Hemant Bangaleea, was believed to be involved in Indur's murder and the local ICAC started investigating Bangaleea in 2006.

=== 2005 Electoral bribery ===
Following the re-election of Ashock Jugnauth as a member of the opposition in the 2005 general election, his defeated rival, Raj Ringadoo, initiated legal action in court. He alleged that Jugnauth's re-election resulted from electoral bribes: specifically, a promised new Muslim cemetery; and jobs to 101 health care assistants from his Constituency No. 8 (Quartier Militaire/Moka) in exchange for votes in his favour. In April 2007, the Supreme Court found Jugnauth guilty. He appealed to the British Privy Council; in November 2008, the Judicial Committee of the British Privy Council upheld the guilty verdict. As a result, Jugnauth lost his seat in the parliament and by-elections had to be held in 2009.

=== Municipality of Quatre Bornes ===
In 2007, municipal councillor Bimla Ramloll was arrested on charges of influence peddling involving the allocation of vacant stalls at the Quatre Bornes Markets. The Mauritian Police seized Rs 259,500 found on her which allegedly came from fraudulent payments. The arrest was made by the Anti-Drug and Smuggling Unit (ADSU) and the investigation was led by elements of the Central Criminal Investigation Department (CCID) and ICAC.

=== Subutex scandal (Richard Duval and Cindy Legallant) ===
In 2008, the prime minister confirmed in Parliament that the Parti Mauricien Social Démocrate (PMSD) parliamentary private secretary (PPS) Richard Duval had officially lodged a request with the Prime Minister's Office on 29 April 2008 to give special access to nutritionist Cindy Legallant to La Terrasse, an exclusive VIP lounge at the island's only airport. Three months later (on 23 July 2008), Cindy Legallant was arrested on arriving in Mauritius with Rs 21 million worth of the drug Subutex (buprenorphine) in her suitcase, hidden amongst baby products. She and Duval had travelled in the same airplane. Duval refused to resign from Parliament despite the public requests of PMSD's president, Maurice Allet. In 2013, Cindy Legallant was arrested and prosecuted for money laundering associated with the illegal trade of Subutex.

=== Infiltration of state bodies by Hardy's Église Chrétienne sect ===
In 2009, Opposition Leader Paul Bérenger raised his concerns in the press about the dangerous links between Xavier-Luc Duval's PMSD, the Tourism Authority, Events Mauritius and Église Chrétienne. Concerns had been raised about the role of a branch of the sect Église Chrétienne called ASPA, as well as Church Team Ministries International (CTMI), as Carole Hardy's proximity to Xavier-Luc Duval made government bodies vulnerable to an infiltration risk. During his term in government Xavier-Luc Duval employed his mistress Carole Hardy as an advisor, whilst her father Miki, headed the Christian sect suspected of being involved in child kidnappings.

=== Labour Party-Betamax Scandal ===
In May 2009, the Labour-PMSD government led by Navin Ramgoolam awarded a multimillion-dollar contract to a newly formed company called Betamax as the sole-supplier of the island's entire oil supply for 15 years to the state-owned State Trading Corporation (STC) despite the attorney general's warning in April 2009 not to bypass the Central Procurement Board. Betamax had been hurriedly formed by Veekram Bhunjun (Labour Party minister Rajesh Jeetah's brother-in-law) after STC's decision (in January 2009) to award the contract to Bhunjun Group. Bhunjun's ready-mix concrete company, Betonix joint-ventured with Singaporean firm Executive Ship Management Pte Ltd (ESM) to form Betamax, which would own and operate a newly built South Korean tanker (MV Red Eagle). By June 2009, Navin Ramgoolam's government amended the legislation to exempt STC from Public Procurement (PP) laws for such contracts, and by November 2009, STC awarded a lucrative 15-year contract to the newly formed Betamax, which would receive increasing compensation, irrespective of the oil price on the global spot market. Soon after Jugnauth's MSM was elected to office in 2014, the STC took measures to scrap the Betamax contract as the price of oil had collapsed, making the rates being charged by Betamax uncompetitive and detrimental to the state of Mauritius. In December 2017, the critical oil supply to Mauritius was nearly interrupted because of an Indian court ruling on this matter, which could have resulted in a countrywide power blackout and economic strife. Labour minister Anil Bachoo and Veekram Bhunjun faced charges of conspiracy. In 2019, the Supreme Court ruled in favour of the Government of Mauritius, deeming the STC-Betamax contract to be illegal. On 15 May 2015, Betamax filed a notice of arbitration against STC, claiming damages for breach of the contract of affreightment (COA). STC objected on various grounds, including that the COA breached PP laws and was therefore illegal and unenforceable. The arbitrator disagreed with STC and made an award in favour of Betamax on 5 June 2017 (the "Award"), which determined that the COA was not made in breach of the PP laws and Betamax was entitled to US$115.3m in damages. Following the Award, both parties applied to the Supreme Court of Mauritius: Betamax to enforce the Award; STC to set aside the Award for several reasons, including that the Award conflicted with the public policy of Mauritius. The Supreme Court agreed with STC and set aside the Award as it held that the contract was made in breach of the PP Act and hence was illegal. The Supreme Court granted Betamax permission to appeal to the Judicial Committee of the Privy Council (the "Board"). On 14 June 2021, the Board allowed Betamax's appeal and enforced the Award, based on its judgement that the Supreme Court was not entitled to review the decision of the arbitrator on the legality of the COA under the Mauritian PP laws.

=== CEB counterfeit Chinese Light Bulbs (Scandale L'Ampoules) ===
In 2010, the Board of the Central Electricity Board (CEB), headed by prominent Labour (PTr) politician Patrick Assirvaden, approved the award of a major procurement contract to the Chinese company Alternative Power Solution Limited (APS), (represented locally by Mohamed Dookhee), for the supply of 660,000 energy-saving Philips light-emitting diode (LED) light bulbs for over Rs 23.37 million. These Philips bulbs would then be sold on to the public at a discounted and subsidized retail price throughout Mauritius to reduce the island's overall power consumption, and thus reduce its oil imports. As a result, the CEB issued a request to Standard Bank (South Africa) to issue a Letter of Credit to Alternative Power Solution Limited (APS) as a guarantee for the purchase. However, the CEB Board had disregarded warnings issued by the Mauritius Revenue Authority (MRA) and the Maurice Ile Durable Committee against Dookhee's APS. When CEB consulted Holland-based Philips to verify if APS was its accredited supplier, it discovered that Philips did not endorse APS. APS was about to supply 660,000 counterfeit bulbs from China instead of the genuine Philips products, which were specified in the contract. CEB then attempted to stop shipment of the bulbs from Shenzhen in China. Based on allegations made in anonymous letters sent to the Prime Minister's Office (PMO) and ICAC, CEB's general manager, Chavan Dabeedin, resigned in November 2010 but was eventually reinstated following a lengthy investigation. However, the failed project resulted in the waste of well over Rs 30 million of public taxpayers' funds and legal costs, given that Standard Bank and Dookhee's APS sued CEB for over a decade to seek compensation, and no bulb was ever supplied by APS to CEB. In 2015, police investigators from the Central Criminal Investigation Department (CCID) began investigating Mohamed Dookhee (APS) to verify if he had forged the Irrevocable Letter of Credit issued to him by the CEB for Standard Bank to pay him by crediting his Mauritius Commercial Bank (MCB) bank account well before dispatch of the counterfeit bulbs from China. In 2019, the Supreme Court ordered the Central Electricity Board (CEB) to pay approximately $802,000 plus interest (~Rs 30 million) to Standard Bank. There is allegedly a "mandat d'arret" against Mohamed Dookhee, who has fled to the UK since he has received the damages.

=== MedPoint Affair ===
In 2010, to create a specialized centre for geriatric care, the Cabinet of Ministers of the ruling PTR-MSM-PMSD government approved the purchase of the existing MedPoint Private Clinic, which was owned by Dr Krishnan Malhotra and Mrs Shalini Devi Jugnauth-Malhotra. The latter is the sister of the then Minister of Finance Pravind Jugnauth and daughter of the then President Sir Anerood Jugnauth. The objective was to convert the hospital into a specialised centre. On 22 July 2011, following an investigation by the Independent Commission Against Corruption (ICAC), then Minister of Health Maya Hanoomanjee was arrested by the ICAC Police and the government chief valuer was suspended from his duties. Pravind Jugnauth was arrested on charges of "conflict of interest". This became known as the MedPoint Affair or MedPoint Scandal. Paul Bérenger, who was Opposition Leader at the time, protested the arrest. On 30 June 2015, Jugnauth was found guilty under Article 13 of the Prevention of Corruption Act 2002 (PoCA). He was sentenced by the Intermediate Court of Mauritius to one year of imprisonment. However, he appealed to the Supreme Court of Mauritius and won his appeal. The prosecution appealed to the Privy Council of the United Kingdom, but their appeal was unsuccessful. To defend the accused parties, the Director General of ICAC, Navin Beekarry, had travelled from Mauritius to London to be present at the January 2019 hearing of this appeal. This was deemed to be a significant conflict of interest by members of the Opposition and the local press.

=== Affaire Shopping Paradise ===
The Anti-Drug and Smuggling Unit (ADSU) started enquiring into fraudulent practices at the Mauritius Duty Free Paradise (MDFP) on 18 August 2010. The president of the duty-free shop, Joydeep Beeharry (Joy Beeharry), a lawyer and relative of Navin Ramgoolam, and 2 other employees, Udaisingh Ramdonee (warehouse and logistics manager) and Gavin Vèle Govinden (marketing manager), were involved in the theft of company property in the form of bottles of perfume, cosmetics, champagne, whisky, wine and other liquor products. Ramdonee and Govinden confessed that Beeharry had authorised them to take these products home. Ramdhonee was arrested at Plaisance Airport's parking in possession of two champagne bottles and expensive perfume, whereas his colleague Govinden was arrested at his home in Pointe-aux-Sables with various cosmetic products. Beeharry then resigned from his position at the MDFP.

=== Affaire Roches Noires (Rolex, Ramgoolam & Ramdhony) ===
In early July 2011, a break-in was reported at Navin Ramgoolam's bungalow located at Roches Noires. After a lengthy police investigation, and after Ramgoolam had significantly changed his original police statement and lied in Parliament, it was revealed that there had been a late-night party after which Ramgoolam fought with the intruder who later left with his Rolex watch. Ramgoolam had earlier denied being present at the bungalow when the intrusion and theft occurred. At the time of the intrusion, other people at the bungalow included Nandanee Soornack and Doomeshwarsing (Rakesh) Gooljaury and his wife. However, by 31 July 2011, the suspect Anand Kumar Ramdhony was already dead. His lifeless body was found in a sitting position inside the jail cell of the Rivière du Rempart police station, which is a relatively long distance away compared to alternative police cells of Grand-Baie, Plaine-des-Papayes and Terre Rouge. Soon afterwards, witness Jacques Bigaignon, who claimed to have heard Ramdhony being beaten up in the jail cell, also died. Claude Drapcand, the security guard who was on duty on the night of the intrusion, also died. Eventually, Deputy Commissioner of Police (DCP) Dev Jokhoo and DCP Rampersad Sooroojbally were arrested for conspiracy to coerce Gooljaury to make a false police statement regarding the presence of Ramgoolam.

=== Bribery case (Richard Duval, Casse siblings and Tourism Authority) ===
In 2011, former stable hand and PMSD Parliamentary Press Secretary (PPS) Richard Duval became the main subject of a bribery investigation by ICAC. PMSD activist Francis Casse, his sister Anne Casse and Richard Duval had been reported to ICAC by a businessman who was promised a Tourism Authority permit to operate pleasure boats in exchange for a bribe of Rs 100,000.00. According to information gathered by ICAC investigators, Duval, Francis Casse and Anne Casse had developed a scheme through which they acted as "facilitators" for the prized permits. Richard Duval's half-brother, Xavier-Luc Duval, had been minister of tourism and the Tourism Authority fell under his jurisdiction for a number of years.

=== Rodrigues General Workers recruitment scandal ===
In September 2012 Johnson Roussety was sentenced to 3 months in prison for having "exercised pressure by means of threat, upon a Public Official with a view to the performance, by that Public Official, of an act in the execution of his duties". Jean-Claude Pierre-Louis (Island Chief Executive) complained to police that Roussety had threatened and intimidated him at his office in Port Mathurin in November 2009, to influence the recruitment of 250 General Workers, and that if Roussety did not have his way then Roussety would have Pierre-Louis sacked by speaking to the Prime Minister. The case was referred to the ICAC which prosecuted Roussety.

=== Bribery and fake documents for Residency Permits (BOI & PIO) ===
An investigation by the Passport and Immigration Office (PIO) in May 2012 revealed the existence of a racket within the Board of Investment (BOI) and the PIO. Several BOI officers (Avinash Roy, Marian Marday, Dayanand Fowdar, Marday Moonien and others) as well as notary Chindee Kunniah were arrested as they formed part of the illicit network, which was active across Mauritius, Réunion and India. Members of the fraudulent network used fake bank guarantees to support a number of applications for Residency Permits for non-Mauritians, such as those issued to French nationals Jean Taye, Phillippe Tokuard, Nadine Toquard, as well as Indian nationals Dhanjay Goondeeah and Vijay Dedhia. Other members of the network, such as Iqbal Mohabuth and Samad Khodabaccus, identified potential customers at the SSR International Airport before offering them residence permits against payment of a bribe to BOI officers.

=== CEB contract for Seetaram's doomed Sarako Solar Farm project ===
In 2012, the CEB awarded the contract to build and operate a solar farm to Labour Party minister Jim Seetaram's brother Sham's firm, called Sarako PVP Co. Ltd., at the estimated cost of Rs 1.2 billion. Navin Ramgoolam inaugurated the 15 megawatt solar farm in June 2014 despite criticisms by the opposition (namely Paul Bérenger of the MMM) that Seetaram's firm, as well as its joint venture partner, had no track record in delivering such projects. Sarako's offer was also higher than its competitors' submissions, its environmental impact was not thoroughly assessed and mitigated, and the contract was awarded by CEB to Sarako in a record time. In 2013 Black River district council issued a Stop Order against the project after it caused the flooding of houses nearby. By the end of 2021, Sarako was placed under receivership as it had failed to pay its creditors.

=== Bangaleea money laundering, fake contracts and attempted murders ===
Labour Party activist and former van driver Hemant Bangaleea has made headlines since 2006, given his involvement in numerous scandals as well as his unexplained wealth and numerous trips overseas. Bangaleea has been a close associate of Navin Ramgoolam. In 2006, authorities started to investigate Bangaleea's suspected involvement in the 2003 murder of another Labour activist, Rajeshwar Indur, as well as fake Letters of Intent during the purchase of prized plots of state-owned land near the coast of La Cambuse and Bel-Ombre. In 2012, Pravind Jugnauth revealed that Bangaleea held $20 million (Rs 600 million) in an HSBC bank account in Singapore, thus triggering a money-laundering investigation by the DPP. The MRA also began investigating Bangaleea's attempt to repurchase his shares in Silver Beach Hotel in 2012. Bangaleea was also arrested in 2012 for swindling of funds and forgery of sales contracts, as Nitesh Ramdharry, the prospective buyer of Rs 40 million worth of land (6 arpents) in Goa, India, discovered that the sale contract issued by Bangaleea was fake. Ramdharry was then threatened and assaulted by thugs who wanted to steal his cash and contract.

=== 2012 sedition charges and MITD paedophilia scandal ===
During a press conference at the Sun Trust on 22 December 2012 Pravind Jugnauth commented on Navin Ramgoolam's government's lack of action despite a pedophilia scandal at the Mauritius Institute of Training and Development (MITD). In fact, the MITD fitness instructor Narain Chedumbrum (Rishi) was accused of having sexual relationships with a 14 year-old student. Preety Sham Chedumbrum, also reported that her husband Narain wanted her to change her previous affidavits which detailed the sexual relationship. At a public meeting held at Renaissance College in Curepipe on 21 February 2013, Jugnauth revealed that despite providing evidence to police, no arrest was being made as Chedumbrum was receiving political protection from minister of Education Vasant Bunwaree. Soon afterwards minister Sheila Bappoo lodged a complaint leading to sedition charges to be laid against Pravind Jugnauth, he was briefly arrested but the Director of Public Prosecutions dismissed the case in 2014. This was considered as an abuse of power by various parties, including Paul Bérenger and the US Department of State in its annual Country Report on Human Rights Practices.

=== Varmagate and the arrest of the Attorney General & PPS ===
On 4 May 2013, Labour Party campaign manager and attorney general Yatin Varma was involved in a car accident at the junction of Des Rosiers Avenue and Trianon 2 Avenue in Quatre Bornes. Eyewitnesses stated that Yatin Varma got out of his car with his father, Monindra Varma, and they both assaulted Florent Jeannot, the driver of the other car. As a result of the aggression, Yatin Varma's wrist had to be treated with an orthopedic cast. Labour Party thugs harassed the main witness, Ravi Seenundun, at his residence. In an attempt to broker a deal, Maurice Allet (president of the Mauritius Ports Authority (MPA) and PMSD) met with Florent's father, Mario Jeannot, at the MPA, Mauritius Turf Club (MTC), and Montmartre church in Rose Hill. Allet proposed a sum of between Rs 1.5 to 1.7 million rupees for Jeannot to withdraw his lawsuit and thus settle matters. Businessman and Labour supporter Raj Ramrachia would be supplying the funds. When these attempts failed, Labour private parliamentary secretary (PPS) Reza Issack started to be involved and organised a meeting at Jeannot's home in Flic-en-Flac where Yatin Varma offered champagne and a book to Florent's mother. Reza Issack's further attempts to settle the matter failed as Jeannot refused to withdraw his police statement. Following Alan Ganoo's query in Parliament, Yatin Varma and PPS Reza Issack resigned. Yatin Varma was hospitalised as he attempted to commit suicide by drinking a bottle of herbicide. Both Labour PPS Reza Issack and Yatin Varma were also arrested.

=== Gambling Gate (Bribery of Judiciary by Lee Shim & Coercion of Witness) ===
Paul Foo Kune, owner of the gambling network Play on Line Ltd, lodged an official complaint at the CCID against his former business associate Jean-Michel Lee Shim in May 2013, accusing him of having bribed the secretaries of judges Asraf Caunhye and Abdurrafeek Hamuth. Foo Kune alleged Lee Shim's bribes had ensured a favourable outcome regarding a gambling system called Sport Data Feed, which specialised in soccer games. Several civil servants employed in the Judiciary were arrested. Chief Inspector Hector Tuyau was also subjected to a police investigation. As he had left Mauritius hurriedly to live in London, it was two years later that Mauritian police finally interrogated Lee Shim in 2015, after bargaining his immunity against prosecution on humanitarian grounds. Barrister Rama Valayden, who became the legal representative of several gambling dens associated with the Mauritius Turf Club, also faced disbarment following allegations he had coerced the main witness, Ahki Bhikajee to withdraw his statement and to change his testimony against a lawyer and the two secretaries of judges Caunhye and Hamuth. British police also initiated an investigation into Lee Shim's business dealings.

=== Customs import duty fraud (Thierry Lagesse) ===
In August 2013, a senior executive of the Groupe Mon Loisir (GML) and textile firm Palmar Ltd, Thierry Lagesse, was arrested by the CCID at the airport in Plaisance following an investigation into customs fraud on luxury cars imported by returning residents. Investigators had established that Mauritian Ashish Kumar Seeburrun had returned to Mauritius in 2011 after living in England for many years, and was entitled to the benefits of the Returning Resident Scheme (RRS), including the right to import his private vehicle from England whilst only paying 15% of its value as import duty. Officers of the Mauritius Revenue Authority (MRA) learned that Seeburrun's Mercedes-Benz SLS63 AMG (worth £143,500.00 or Rs 7.9 Million) was being used solely by businessman Thierry Lagesse in blatant contravention of the law. Dhaneshwar Toolsee, director of car import firm SS Motor Point, was also arrested. He revealed that Thierry Lagesse had requested an under-evaluation of Seeburrun's Mercedes SLS 63 AMG in December 2010. Seeburrun's Mercedes AMG was confiscated by government authorities and there followed a lengthy prosecution of Lagesse, Seeburrun and Toolsee and court appeals. Lagesse and Seeburrun had contested the 2016 judgement by of the Director of Public Prosecutions (DPP) to appeal their acquittal to the Queen's Privy Council. In 2020, the Council upheld DPP's decision and decided that the two will face a new trial for conspiracy and "possession of goods on which excise duty was not paid" in front of the intermediary court.

=== Lottotech revenge scam ===
In September 2013, journalist Stellio Antonio, who worked as public affairs manager of lottery company Lottotech, was arrested by Mauritian police following allegations made by Teemal Gokool. In January 2021, Antonio was acquitted as Gokool confessed in court that local police inspector Rajaram had coerced him to make false allegations against Antonio as an act of revenge. For several years prior to his arrest, Antonio had published articles which were critical of the Police des Jeux (Gambling Police), some of which led to the punitive transfer of police officer Rajaram. In 2013, Gokool had alleged that Antonio approached him as part of a Rs 28.3 million scam whereby Gokool would claim the prize after pretending to have lost the winning ticket.

=== Fraud Campus, Université Marron, EIILM, UoM and Rajesh Jeetah ===
Since 2007, the tertiary education minister (Labour Party) Rajesh Jeetah's brother Sunil had been the sole owner of the Eastern Institute for Integrated Learning in Management (EIILM)'s campus in Mauritius. It operated as a private fee-paying university for several years. Hundreds of students graduated from the EIILM's campus in Mauritius. However, the University Grants Commission of India does not recognize Indian universities that are located outside Indian territory. A number of universities have denied EIILM's degree programmes and its graduates' entry into postgraduate programmes, as their qualifications were not recognised outside EIILM's realm. In Parliament, Minister Jeetah persistently denied that EIILM's activities had been illegal, defending his brother's institution as being totally independent from the original Sikkim-based EIILM. The former vice-chancellor (VC) of the University of Mauritius (UoM), R. Rughooputh, also revealed that his contract had been unduly terminated for his refusal to support Rajesh Jeetah's ambition to grow the number of foreign universities based in Mauritius. In 2014, Jeetah even promoted the Ugandan branch of the Open University of Mauritius, which he claimed would be quality assured by British education authorities. The scandal became known locally as "Université Marron" (or Fraud Campus). Following official protests by the University Grants Commission (UGC) of India, and after Navin Ramgoolam's Labour (PTr) lost the 2014 general elections to its rival MSM, the Tertiary Education Commission (TEC) of Mauritius withdrew its support for the Mauritian campus of EIILM in December 2015. The uncertain fate of the hundreds of graduates of EIILM (Mauritius) and other illegal campuses remains unresolved.

=== Affaire Boskalis ===
In 2013, Dutch dredging group Boskalis was fined the equivalent of €1000 by a court in Mauritius for making illicit payments to a port official. Witness Jan Cornelis Haak, a representative of Boskalis International Bv, pleaded guilty of giving bribes and kickbacks of Rs 3 million in US Dollars and Euros to ex-minister Siddick Chady and his allies to secure the major contract for dredging the port in 2006. Following the same Boskalis bribery scandal, Prakash Maunthrooa (ex-director of Mauritius Ports Authority (MPA) and political lobbyist for several parties), was found guilty and was sentenced to nine months' jail time in November 2019. Siddick Chady (ex-chairman of MPA and prominent former Labour (PTr) was also sentenced to nine months in jail. Chady and Maunthrooa had received around Rs 3 million in bribes and kick-backs to favour contractor Boskalis in the award of dredging contracts near Canal Anglais and others. Boskalis made some payments to Siddick Chady via Gilbert Philippe, chairman of the MPA. Moreover, Boskalis also paid Siddick Chady six times via Yashraj Films (India) and Maurifilms (La Réunion) for Siddick Chady's private film-importing company, Blockbuster.

=== Affaire Sunkai Ponzi Scheme ===
Former PMXD municipal councilor Bhimla Ramloll (nicknamed Madame Kaba or "handbag lady") was arrested in April 2013 following the collapse of a Ponzi scheme hosted by her company Sunkai Company Limited. Victims of the Sunkai Ponzi scheme had been promised that their investment would double within three months. Several policemen were acting as agents for Bhimla Ramloll's scheme and a number of lawyers were also actively involved in her business. The estimated total cost of Ramloll's fraud is Rs 768 million. In May 2018, she was arrested for her involvement in an armed robbery at a jeweller's shop in Rose Belle. Bhimla and her husband Mohit Ramloll were accused of money laundering having purchased a plot of 365 square meters in Sodnac for Rs 2.6 million to launder money. In May 2021, the court hearing was postponed for the 17th time as her lawyer claimed to be too sick to represent her. Thus, Bhimla Ramloll and her husband Mohit Ramloll were granted bail against payment of Rs 200,000.

=== 2014 missing case file Richard Duval Pailles drink driving ===
In August 2014, an internal audit revealed that Richard Duval's case file had mysteriously disappeared from the records of the Ministry of Justice. In July 2013, Richard Duval (PMSD politician and president of the State Property Development Company) had refused to undergo a breath test, blood test and urine test after he lost control of his BMW near Mauvilac's compound at Pailles. After being charged with driving without due care and attention as well as failing to provide a specimen of the breath for a breath test, Richard Duval then failed to appear in Court for the scheduled hearing in February 2014, instead opting to fly for a few days to South Africa.

=== Crown land allocated to Labour political activists and allies ===
Following the December 2014 elections, the new government investigated activists and allies of the ex-PM Navin Ramgoolam. It initiated criminal proceedings to recover about 1,000 acres (1,150 arpents) of state-owned land allocated to various organisations and allies under the Labour government since 2005. The legal documentation was lodged with the State Law Office (SLO) and CCID was also involved in the inquiry. The principal targets under investigation were:

- Arya Samaj and Labour Party activist Suryadeo Sungkur for beachfront land for his restaurant Ritum Coffee at Trou Aux Biches and
- Lekram Nunlall (Tarisa Resort) and Navin Unoop (Voice of Hindu and Vijay Om Hamara).

The new government also targeted other land deals by businesses and people who were considered close to the former PM and the Labour Party. These included:

- Corporate Hotel Ltd 30 arpents (25.3 ac) since 2009;
- British American Investment (BAI)'s subsidiary Tucson Ltd., founded by Dawood Rawat 20 arpents (17 ac);
- Dhanjay Callikan (Whitewater Consulting Services), 4 arpents (3.3 ac) in Balaclava. Dhanjay is the brother of Dhananjay (Dan Callikan), Navin Ramgoolam's former adviser and former head of Mauritius Broadcasting Corporation (MBC) and National Transport Corporation (NTC);
- Sandranee Ramjoorawon (cousin of Navin Ramgoolam, 7.3 arpents (6 ac) in Palmar for an apartment complex via company Dream Spa & Resorts Limited), and
- Tommy Ah-Teck 19.7 arpents (16.6 ac) at Albion Beach for the construction of a hotel through his company Insignia Leisure Resorts Ltd. Tommy stated their group has never been the subject of a single inquiry or a dispute concerning its behavior or its general management.
- 31 arpents (26.1) granted to Labour Party treasurer Deva Virahsawmy's company Midas Acropolis.
- Granting of 12.5 arpents (10.5) of land to Beta Cement, a subsidiary of Betonix, owned by Veekram Bhunjun, the brother of ex-minister Rajesh Jeetah's wife.
- acres of land granted to Ah-Fat Lan Hin Choy, the ex-treasurer of the Labour Party.
- 30 arpents (25.3 ac) granted to Pride Bridge in Palmar for a doomed eco-tourism project. The company Pride Bridge was created in 2008 by individuals who were close to Navin Ramgoolam and the Labour Party, namely Nandanee Soornack's father Habeemanoo Soornack, Rakesh Gooljaury's ex-wife Natacha Rugoo, Khushal Lobine (ex-president of Waste Water Management Authority, ex-president of State Insurance Company, and lawyer for Soonack and Gooljaury) and ex-journalist Harish Chundunsing.

=== Arson after a disputed land sale involving notary Deelchand ===
In April 2015, notary Vinay Deelchand and his three collaborators, Sandeep Appadoo, Mahendra Choonea and Dharmanand Sambon, were convicted and sentenced for hatching a malicious plot to set Anwar Toorabally's house on fire on 17 August 2000. On that day, a molotov cocktail was thrown on Toorabally's house located at Shakespeare Rd, Port Louis and his all-terrain vehicle caught fire. Prior to that incident, Toorabally had sold 3 arpents of vacant land located at Bois-Pignolet, Terre-Rouge to a resident of Long Mountain for the agreed sum of Rs 3 million. However, Toorabally only received Rs 1 Million and when he tried to recover the remaining Rs 2 million he discovered that notary Deelchand and his associates Appadoo, Chooneea and Sambon had bought out the property. Antoine Chetty, the former bodyguard of notary Vinay Deelchand, revealed that his boss had ordered him to burn down Toorabally's house and throw acid on his face as a form of intimidation. Antoine Chetty had made allegations against several high-profile persons during 2004, including former Commissioner of Police, Raj Dayal. He was in concert with his lawyer, Samad Goolamaully, and several journalists of the mainstream media who were portraying him as a repentant convict. Several allegations proved to be baseless, the last one being against a professional accountant known as Yajnyandra Nath Varma (Yash Varma), who was a Manager working for KPMG Mauritius. The charge against Yash Varma was dropped within one and a half years due to the allegation being saddled with lies and the police not finding a single piece of evidence, although the accountant lost his job in the process, having been a victim of trial by press. Following that case, charges against other persons against whom allegations had been made earlier by Antoine Chetty were dropped. It seemed he was using the allegations as a means of blackmail. His own lawyer had been sentenced to prison at the age of 12 in England. Antoine Chetty himself was a drug dealer who would serve several years in prison.

=== Bramer, BAI and SIC fraud, collusion and money laundering ===
In 2015, former Labour Party MP and former director of State Investment Corporation (SIC) Iqbal Mallam Hassam was arrested and investigated by ICAC for potential collusion. He had purchased two lots of office space in Bramer House (located at Cybercity in Ebene) from Bramer Property Fund (BPF) for Rs 105 million in 2014 after contracting a loan from Bramer Bank (part of BAI) through his newly created private entity Ottoman Capital Ltd (OCL) via Byzantium Trust, following Ashvin Dwarka's advice. Although these offices had been valued at Rs 115 million they were sold to Iqbal Mallam Hassam for only Rs 105 million. In addition, SIC, which Iqbal Hallam Hassam was heading, had invested Rs 155 million in BPF without seeking the approval of the board of directors. This suspicious arrangement generated a monthly profit of Rs 210 000 for Iqbal Mallam Hassam at the expense of the clients of Bramer Asset Management Ltd and Bramer Property Fund. The owner and landlord Bramer Property Fund also oddly became a tenant, as it had to pay Rs 520 000 monthly (for renting the 11th floor) to Iqbal Mallam Hassam's Ottoman Capital Ltd, as well as an additional Rs 335 000 per month to rent out space on the ground floor. The CCID also investigated Iqbal Mallam Hassam for suspected collusion and conflict of interest with the British American Investment (BAI) group. The courts found no wrongdoing and subsequently cleared Iqbal Mallam-Hasham of all charges by striking down the prosecution's case.

=== Sun Tan Hotels, Palmar and Crown Land lease scandal (DPP Boolell) ===
In 2015, ICAC made preparations to arrest Satyajit Boolell on his arrival at the island's only airport. Boolell, director of public prosecutions (DPP) and the brother of senior Labour ex-minister Arvin Boolell, was being investigated following claims he had used his influence to coerce officers of the Ministry of Housing & Land (MoHL) to renew a long-term lease of crown land (Térrain à Bail) by 60 years to private firm Sun Tan Hotels Pty Ltd, of which DPP Boolell is a director. The crown land, located in the prime location of Palmar, had been allocated to Boolell's Sun Tan Hotels Pty Ltd (incorporated on 19 May 1987, and involved in the tourism sector). ICAC is also investigating potential conflict of interest given that Satyajit Boolell had requested and attended a meeting in 2011 with the Ministry of Housing & Land to bargain the amount of rent payable under the crown land lease to Rs 45,000 per year, although he had already been party (along with the solicitor general) to prior consultations with state authorities in 2008 regarding an overall increase from Rs 45 000 to Rs 1.6 million annually, in line with the revised requirements of the Ministry of Finance. Thus, the shortfall for the Mauritian taxpayer over a lease of 60 years would be Rs 93.3 million, in favour of DPP Boolell's firm Sun Tan Hotels. ICAC also found it unusual for DPP Boolell to have requested and attended such a meeting, given that for such matters, Sailesh Beenessreesingh, another director of Sun Tan Hotels Pty Ltd, usually attended.

=== Scandal Mauritius Sports Council & activist Khudurun (No.8) ===
Less than a year after the December 2014 elections, political activist Nawshad Khudurun, who had campaigned actively for the MSM in Constituency No. 8, was awarded a contract by the Mauritius Sports Council (MSC) to produce a marketing clip to promote the upcoming National Sports Awards Night (January 2016), although he was not the lowest bidder. At that time, the MSC was under the direct control of the ex-minister of Youth and Sports, Yogida Sawmynaden, who had been elected in the same Constituency (No. 8) where Khudurun had campaigned for the minister's party (MSM). But Khudurun further revealed that a senior civil servant from the MSC had requested a bribe of Rs 15,000 for Khudurun to receive the Rs 176,000 owed to him under the terms of the contract. The PRO of the Ministry of Youth & Sports gave him a cheque for Rs 18,000. Later, Khudurun produced sound recordings of conversations to report these cases of malpractice to ICAC, as Minister Yogida Sawmynaden offered him an additional Rs 18,000 in cash.

=== DCL, Ramalingum, school tablets and the internet ===
In 2015, the Minister of Education, Leela Devi Dookun-Luchoomun, cancelled the contract of private firm Data Communications Limited (DCL) for the supply of electronic tablets to primary schools. DCL's director, Ganesh Ramalingum, had already received a deposit of Rs 21.7 million without supplying a single tablet to any school. The Dookun-Luchoomun ministry filed a legal claim of Rs 141.2 million, which includes compensation costs. However, in February 2017, then Minister of Technology Yogida Sawmynaden awarded another major contract (to connect 160 schools to the internet) to DCL via the Central Procurement Board (CPB). DCL's Ramalingum requested advance payment of Rs 45 million via the State Law Office. Shortly afterwards, DCL went into receivership without setting up any internet connections.

=== Affaire Bale Couleur ===
In April 2016, the ICAC recommended formal proceedings against the former minister of the Environment, Raj Dayal, with charges of bribery by a public official. The minister was dismissed when details of an audio recording ("bande sonore") were released to the public via the press. The recording suggested he was asking for a bribe of Rs 1 million from businessman Saheed Nawab Soobhany "Patrick" for the purchase of 50 bags of food-grade pigmented powder (colloquially known in French as "Bale Couleur") used during the Hindu festival of Holi, in exchange for an Environmental Impact Assessment permit for a real estate project in Gros-Cailloux. The case has been postponed several times following Dayal's requests to put a stay on the case due to health reasons. In May 2019, Soobhany was declared bankrupt.

=== Euroloan scandal ===
In mid-2015, the MSM minister of finance, Vishnu Lutchmeenaraidoo, on behalf of his SVL Trust, obtained a loan of €1.1 million (approximately Rs 45 million) from the State Bank of Mauritius (SBM), with few details about the purpose of the loan; he provided no assets as security. Despite the list of concerns raised by SBM's Credit Committee, its chairman and president Nayen Koomar Ballah, who is also the brother-in-law of Prime Minister Sir Anerood Jugnauth, not only approved the loan as an "emergency" but also dropped the interest rate from 1.9 percent to 1.5 percent and even increased the loan amount from the requested €1.0 million to €1.1 million. Details of the scandal, a conflict of interest since Ballah's name was proposed by Vishnu Lutchmeenaraidoo for SBM's Credit Committee, eventually came out. When ICAC started its enquiry, Vishnu Lutchmeenaraidoo said that the loan was only for €400,000 and then provided his residence (worth only Rs 33.48 million or €384,584) as security for the loan of Rs 45 million (€516,642). As a result of the scandal, Jugnauth reshuffled his cabinet in March 2016 and Vishnu Lutchmeenaraidoo was transferred from the Ministry of Finance to become the Minister of Foreign Affairs.

=== Seetaram's land deals and unpaid loans ===
Former Speaker of the National Assembly Iswurdeo Seetaram and his wife Rookmeenee Bundhoo-Seetaram were found guilty of breach of contract and were fined for misleading buyers of land located in Henrietta in April 2016. At the time of the land sale in 2004, Seetaram had committed to provide water supply, electricity and access to the buyers before July 2008. However, as the Seetaram couple did not provide any such services, the buyers sued them for damages. In November 2016, another couple sued Seetaram for a similar breach of contract and for making misleading claims.

In October 2016, former Labour Party minister Jim Seetaram was the subject of an affidavit for the repossession of a Porsche Cayenne, which he was leasing from La Prudence Leasing Finance Company Limited. Leading up to the affidavit, the leasing company had requested payment several times, but Seetaram failed to repay. The company then tried to recover the Rs 1.77 million which he owed.

In November 2016, Labour Party member and former Speaker of Parliament Iswurdeo Seetaram, Jim's father, was subject to a prosecution in the Masters’ Court after failing to repay Rs 3.9 million that he had borrowed from the Development Bank of Mauritius (DBM) in order to finance his private firm Bharatee Mixed Farming. As a result, the DBM attempted to recover its funds via the Sale by Levy process, involving two blocks of land at Cité EDC Henrietta, which Seetaram had used as security for the loans.

=== National Computer Board ===
In May 2016, the representative of Techno Women Organization (TWO) Institute and Cisco Systems filed suit against the National Computer Board (NCB) and executives of the Mauritius Qualifications Authority (MQA). It was alleged that a bribe of Rs 200,000 was demanded for a contract worth Rs 2 Million to be used to organize a course (290 hours of lessons) on technology.

=== Grand Baie Rs 48 Million windfall profit for Minister Soodhun's family ===
In 2016, Umeir Soodhun, the son of then Vice Prime Minister Showkutally Soodhun, made a profit of Rs 48 Million by selling his shares in a private company, which only a few months earlier had been granted a 60-year lease on 1931 square metres of State-owned prime real estate (Pas Géométriques) along the beach of Grand Baie. Although the original lease between the Government of Mauritius and Soodhun's company (Société Mohamad Umeeir Ibne Showkut) was not transferable to another party, Umeir Soodhun sold all his shares to transfer ownership of the 60-year lease to four Chinese foreign nationals. Soodhun even managed to overcome legal restrictions which apply to foreign ownership of Mauritian land by obtaining Sir Anerood Jugnauth's special authorisation. Indeed, the Non-Citizens Property Restriction Act prevents foreign nationals from acquiring, holding, alienating or purchasing real estate without a special certificate issued by the Prime Minister's Office. However, by 9 November 2016, Jugnauth had already issued a special certificate which authorised the sale of all of Soodhun's company's shares to Chinese nationals Milao Wang, Jianzhong Zhu, Yu Sun and Liu Senhua. Notary Wenda Sawmynaden, wife of Minister Yogida Sawmynaden, prepared the legal documents for the sale. Originally, on 18 June 2012, Minister Soodhun and his wife had transferred their shares to their son Umeir, and the shares were valued at only Rs 14 million.

=== Eshan Juman's bribery of a public official ===
In November 2016, Labour Party MP and former deputy Lord Mayor Mohamed Eshan Juman was found guilty of "bribery of a public official". As a result, and despite an appeal, Juman was sentenced to 1 month in jail. In 2007, Eshan Juman had attempted to bribe police constable Juwaheer in an attempt to avoid a fine when he was caught using his mobile phone whilst driving, and he had also refused to provide his driver's licence. During his court appearance, Eshan Juman claimed to be a truck driver, although he was the deputy Lord Mayor.

=== Independent Broadcasting Authority(IBA) ===
In 2016, Alentaris selected the candidates for the job of director of the Independent Broadcasting Authority (IBA). The president of the IBA, who was a member of the political party in power, was hired as director. In April 2016, ICAC opened an investigation into the recruitment of the director of the IBA.

In 2017, a newspaper uncovered the questionable practice of the director of IBA to solicit US$15000 from investors for each project, which required the collaboration of a government ministry.

=== Biscuitgate ===
In February 2017, Shakeel Mohamed, a member of Parliament and head of the Labour Party, filed a vote of no confidence against Speaker Maya Hanoomanjee, whose daughter's company, Rum and Sugar Ltd, had been awarded contracts to supply tinned biscuits to state-owned organisations. The product had been removed from shelves following investigations into the company's manufacturing practices. The scandal became known as "biscuitgate".

The tins, which were supplied by a local baker, were misleadingly labeled, 'Made in UK'. There was a 3300% markup on the locally made biscuits, and the packaging address, which was required to be reported per sanitary laws, was fake.

=== Cardiac Centre & Vijaya Sumputh affair ===
In March 2017, Health Minister Husnoo revealed that political activist Vijaya Sumputh and a close associate of his predecessor, Anil Gayan, had received a 200% increase in her salary as director of the Trust Fund for Specialized Medical Care (TFSMC). The case was subjected to a Fact-Finding Committee (FFC), and its findings were sent to ICAC. In October 2018, the prime minister had told the National Assembly that ICAC had already initiated an investigation of the controversy in March 2017, but no arrests were made. In January 2019, the former chairman of the TFSMC, Vishwamitra Ramjee, was summoned for questioning as well. Earlier, Vijaya Sumputh had also been nominated by then-health minister Anil Gayan as head of the Cardiac Centre. Their association made headlines in 2004 after Vijaya Sumputh was nominated as director of the Tourism Authority when Anil Gayan was minister of tourism. In 2012, Gayan and Sumputh jointly registered a new company—Southall Company Limited—to offer management consultancy services. In 2013, Gayan and Sumputh created a second joint company—Lex Advoc Associates Company Limited—to offer real estate consultancy services.

=== NMH takeover scandal ===
In March 2017, accountant Kriti Taukoordass was nominated as Special Investigator by the Financial Services Commission (FSC) in order to investigate the attempt by a group of Franco-Mauritians to undertake a hostile takeover of New Mauritius Hotels Ltd (NMH) in February 2016. Hector Noël (Espitalier-Noël Ltd (ENL) Land Ltd), Louis Rivalland (CEO of Swan), Notary Jean Pierre Montocchio, managers of Rogers, and others were involved in the joint attempt to buy Rs 1.4 Billions' worth of shares of the NMH. As a result, competitive offers from other parties, such as Sunnystars Resorts Holdings, were not involved in the final transaction. By mid 2017 investigator Taukoordass tabled his interim report, which highlighted significant findings and anomalies. However, political nominees of the MSM government (Gérard Sanspeur and Dev Manraj) intervened to prevent the release of Taukoordass' final report, by non-payment of his invoice. Indeed, investigator Taukoordass has been threatened with legal actions by both ENL-Rogers-Swan (Rs 800 million) and NMH (Rs 200 million). As a result, no further investigative action against Noël brothers, Rivalland, Montocchio, Taylor and others has yet been possible.

=== Obstruction of a police officer by Ajay Gunness ===
In April 2017, Ajay Gunness, the secretary general of the MMM and a member of Parliament, intervened at the Flic-en-Flac police station to release his brother-in-law Sanjay, who was under police arrest for drink-driving. During a routine check on Saturday, 15 April 2017, police officers of the Road Safety Unit breath-tested Sanjay, who was driving a car. As he had an alcohol level of 36 milligrams in his blood, which exceeded the legal limit by 11 milligrams, he was arrested and locked up at the Flic-en-Flac police station. However, Ajay Gunness soon arrived there and instructed Sanjay, a resident of Montagne-Blanche, to ignore the police officers' instructions, before leading Sanjay out of the station without authorisation from the police officers on duty. A policeman on duty reported that Ajay Gunness also implored them to drop the case. They both left in Sanjay's car, which was being driven by his wife. Charges of Obstructing Police Officer under section 13G of the Police Act or Molesting Public Officer under section 3 of the Public Officers Protection Act and Outrage against an agent of civil Authority under section 159 of the Criminal Code were contemplated against Gunness. After initial investigations, the latter was reconvened by police for further questioning, and he was placed under arrest. Reference to this incident was made in the National Assembly as a bad example of political intervention to protect one's drunk relative.

=== Credit Card shopping scandal ===
In March 2018, the president of Mauritius, Ameenah Gurib-Fakim, resigned from office following a scandal revealed by the local press, embarrassing the ruling government, which had supported her nomination to the ceremonial office. Receipts from the president's overseas private expenditures—luxury goods such as jewellery and clothing—using a credit card provided by a non-government organisation (NGO) were published. The NGO was founded by an Angolan banker who was keen to obtain a banking licence and other investments in Mauritius. Ameenah Gurib-Fakim had allegedly used the credit card from London-based Planet Earth Institute (PEI) to buy items worth US$26,000, not related to her work for PEI.

=== Trianon Rs 15 million windfall for minister ===
To further the progress of the Metro Express project, the Ministry of Land and Housing bought back 42 blocks of land as part of a compulsory acquisition scheme in 2017–18. One of the beneficiaries of the scheme was Minister of Health Anwar Husnoo, whose 897 square meter plot of land in Sodnac (Trianon) was purchased for Rs 15 million, or Rs 16,833 per square meter, whereas other landowners only received much lower compensation. Other members of the public received between Rs 824 per square meter and Rs 11317 per square meter.

=== 2015-2018 Commission of Enquiry on Drug Trafficking ===
In July 2018, the Commission of Inquiry on Drug Trafficking (chaired by former Puisne Judge Paul Lam Shang Leen) published its report after 3 years of investigation. The report described the methods used by the key players involved in this illegal activity. Within a few days, 3 members of the MSM resigned from office. Lawyer Roubina Jadoo-Jaunbocus, Minister of Gender Equality, had visited numerous inmates at various prisons (for example, 37 visits in 2009), including the most notorious convicted drug trafficker Peroumal Veeren. Roubina Jadoo-Jaunbocus had also performed unsolicited visits to inmates' jail cells, although they were not even her clients. The commission also reported that she had acted as a middleman in money laundering on behalf of jailed drug traffickers. Sanjeev Teeluckdharry, who is the Deputy Speaker of the MSM government, initially attempted not to testify before the commission but failed. He had also performed numerous unsolicited visits and placed many phone calls with jailed drug traffickers, including convict Rudolf Derek Jean Jacques, also known as 'Gro Derek'. Sanjeev Teeluckdharry had also instructed an inmate to make false allegations against a police officer of the Anti-Drug and Smuggling Unit (ADSU). The commission was also very critical of lawyer Abdool Raouf Gulbul, member of the MSM and husband of Chief Justice Rehana Mungly-Gulbul, who was also president of the Gambling Regulatory Authority (GRA). Gulbul was criticised for his use of burner phones, his ability to pervert the course of justice and for profiting from the proceeds of drug trafficking, such as in the case of convicted trafficker Siddick Islam, who paid Rs 25 million to Gulbul using money made from the illicit traffic. Gulbul's electoral campaign in Constituency No.3 had also been financed by drug trafficker Sada Curpen. Gulbul was also known to instruct his junior employees to top up the bank accounts of jailed traffickers. Various lawyers, including Samad Goolamally, Ashley Hurrhangee and Tisha Shamloll, also testified against Raouf Gulbul.

=== Luanda Leaks ===
When the ICIJ released the Luanda Leaks records regarding billionaire Russian-Angolan Isabel dos Santos, and soon after, in which dos Santos' personal wealth manager Nuno Ribeiro da Cunha was found dead, the connection with Mauritian Vincent Ah-Chuen was also brought to light in early 2020. Vincent Ah-Chuen, son of the ABC Group's founder, served as a director of Sun Wukong Services, the "nominee" shareholder for the dos Santos-Dokolo couple in Saguaro. Since 2006, ABC Global Management Services, the ABC Group's offshore arm, has helped dos Santos and Sindika Dokolo administer Saguaro Management. In 2006, Saguaro Management was created in Mauritius as one of the structures and companies designed to fund dos Santos' new beer-manufacturing venture. In 2016, a second Mauritian company, Sun Wukong Services Limited, held shares as a nominee in Saguaro Management for dos Santos and Dokolo. As a result of this arrangement, public documents would not display the dos Santos name, although it allowed the dos Santos-Dokolo couple to fully control the company.

=== St Louis Gate ===
In June 2020, a corruption scandal dubbed St Louis gate came to light and involved government political appointees, board members of the Central Electricity Board (CEB) and Danish firm Burmeister & Wain Scandinavian Contractor (BWSC). In 2014, the CEB issued a tender package, which was cancelled and reissued in 2015 for a major upgrade of an existing diesel power station at St. Louis, on the outskirts of the capital city, Port Louis. BWSC was awarded the contract, but a whistleblower alerted the financier African Development Bank (ADB) about the bribes received by several CEB employees through an intermediary. ADB investigated the claims and thus excluded BWSC from all future work for 21 months. In June 2020, after this was raised in Parliament, the entire management team of CEB was stood down and replaced. By the end of June 2020, Prime Minister Pravind Jugnauth had dismissed the deputy prime minister from the Cabinet. The deputy PM also held the portfolio of Minister of Energy. The dismissal came after the PM received a report, which had been released by ADB, alleging that bribes had been paid to various parties, including Paul Bérenger of the MMM, via an intermediary during the tendering process.

In July 2020, the contracting firm PAD & Company Limited was placed under voluntary administration after revelations of fake bank guarantees for a civil works contract worth Rs 210 million, as well as revelations of the firm's involvement in the BWSC-CEB-ADB St Louis gate scandal. ICAC investigators interrogated Shamshir Mukoon (former director of CEB) and Alain Hao Thyn Voon (former director of contracting firm PAD & CO).

On 5 September 2020, Bertrand Lagesse, consulting engineer for Burmeister & Wain Scandinavian Contractor (BWSC), was arrested in Mauritius for contravening Articles 3 (1) (b), 6 and 8 of the Financial Intelligence and Anti-Money Laundering Act of May 2016. He is suspected of having acquired a property worth €212,948 (Rs 10 Million) as well as for holding Rs 8.17 Million in a bank account using proceeds of this corruption. Bertand Lagesse had erased his telephone and computer records at the time of his arrest.

=== Tamarin $6 Million profit for PPS Rawoo ===
On 12 June 2020, Labour MP Eshan Juman revealed details of a contract between the Ministry of Land and Housing and a private firm called Smart Clinics Ltd. The firm is owned by MSM Parliamentary Private Secretary (PPS) Ismaël Rawoo, as well as his mother and his brother. The company shares are owned by three family members of the PPS: Ismaël Muhammad Rawoo (1,000 shares), An Naas Hamid Muhammad Rawoo (60,600 shares) and Aisha Bee Boodhoo-Rawoo (39,400 shares). On 24 May 2018, Smart Clinics obtained a lease of 60 years on two acres of prime beachfront state-owned land (commonly called Crown Land) in Grande Rivière Noire, in the exclusive precinct of Tamarin, Mauritius, in Black River. The Rawoos have recently signed a Memorandum of Understanding (MOU) with a South African company called Two Futures to develop this land. The existing decrepit hotel—Island Sports Club—which was built on the two acres when the Khedarun family held the lease, will be demolished and replaced by a dental and medical clinic, restaurant and apartments. As part of the deal, PPS Rawoo's family will pay the Khedaruns Rs 15.05 million, while they have agreed to sell the renewed lease to Two Futures for Rs 250 million. Thus, PPS Rawoo's family will generate a profit of around Rs 235 million (US$6 million) from this deal within less than two years.

=== Angus Lane property deal ===
At the end of August 2020, public revelations were made of a land transaction dating back to 2008 during which the two underage daughters of Pravind Jugnauth became the owners of a block of land worth Rs 20 million at Angus Lane in Vacoas, on which the prime minister has recently built his private mansion. Alan Govinden, a middleman, paid Rs 20 million to another party in England to acquire the land. Shortly afterwards, ownership of the same land was transferred into the names of Jugnauth's underage daughters—aged 13 and 15. ICAC began to investigate this transaction in 2011, but no progress has been made to date. The block of land was originally part of Domaine des Rountree, with an area of 7,023 square metres (1.735 acres) and adjoined an existing property owned by Jugnauth. It belonged to the well-established Bel-Air Sugar Estate. A Mauritian film producer and businessman, Loganaden Govinden, also known as Alan, who migrated to the United Kingdom, acted as a middleman. The sale contract, which was written by notary Jérôme Koenig, confirms that the seller received the sum of Rs 20 million. Political leaders Roshi Bhadain and Paul Bérenger demanded that Jugnauth provide full details of the transaction, which appears to be highly unethical.

=== Murder of whistle-blower Kistnen and activist Fakhoo ===
On 18 October 2020, the partially burnt body of MSM activist Soopramanien Kistnen was discovered in a sugar cane field at Telfair, Moka. The field, which belongs to the Mon Desert Alma Sugar Estate, had also been set alight. Before his death, he was about to contact ICAC to reveal fake bidding practices within state-owned corporations under the MSM government. Kistnen's company, Final Cleaning Ltd, was an unsuccessful bidder for a cleaning contract with the State Trading Corporation (STC). Earlier, Kistnen's other company, Rainbow Construction Ltd, also missed out on a contract worth Rs 4.3 million to supply COVID-19 test kits. Both contracts were awarded to Vinay Appanah's company, Techno-World Co Ltd. Vinay Appanah is the brother-in-law of the director of the STC, Jonathan Ramasamy. S. Kistnen's wife, Simla, revealed that Minister Sawmynaden also invented a fictitious position for her as "Constituency Clerk" in the Civil Service, but the Minister has been pocketing that Rs 15,000 per month salary. However, after a lengthy legal process, Yogida Sawmynaden was acquitted in May 2024, as Simla Kistnen was deemed to be lying profusely in Court in her attempts to tarnish Sawmynaden's reputation. This raised further questions about the true authors of this politically motivated mud-slinging campaign, which was fully supported by lawyers calling themselves "Avengers". Kistnen was also about to reveal how 1200 Bangladeshi nationals, who arrived in Mauritius under work permit visas, voted in several constituencies during the 2019 General Elections. He was also about to divulge the widespread practice of fake invoicing by civil works contractors with political connections, such as the fake invoices he had issued regarding the beach fences for the South African owners of Clear Ocean Hotel at Pomponnette. The mobile phone that Yogida Sawmynaden gave to Kistnen to discuss business deals went missing, but photos from that phone appeared in propaganda videos released by MSM in an attempt to discredit Kistnen and his wife Simla. Kistnen's close associate, Preetam Matadin, has been physically assaulted by policemen in an attempt to make him confess to Kistnen's murder. Police also examined his car. MSM political activist and stand-over man Swastee Rao Fakhoo (also known as Manan Fakoo) was shot dead on 20 January 2021 in Beau Bassin, soon after he organised a street demonstration to show support to embattled ex-minister Yogida Sawmynaden during the latter's court appearance regarding Kistnen's murder and allegations of fictitious employment against him.

=== Murder and deaths of civil servants Kanakiah, Vythelingum and Boitieux ===
Pravin Kanakiah, who worked as Procurement Officer at the Ministry of Finance, was found dead on the coastal region called La Roche Qui Pleure in Souillac on 11 December 2020, near Minister of Finance Renganaden Padayachy's mansion. During the night prior to the discovery of Kanakiah's corpse, fishermen witnessed seven men dump the body in the dark. There were signs of an assault all over his body. Both Soopramanien Kistnen and Pravin Kanakiah had been involved in the awarding of contracts to sympathisers of Jugnauth's party, the MSM, associated with the COVID-19 pandemic. His wife Reshmee, confirmed that just before his disappearance, Kanakiah was about to make revelations about significant cases of financial malpractice within his department, and that he was about to be punitively transferred to the Ministry of Health. Sarah Boitieux, a civil servant working at the Prime Minister's Office (PMO), was found dead under suspicious circumstances in what appeared to be a hanging from the handle of a cupboard in Helvetia in December 2020. In mid-January 2021, the Secretary of the State Trading Corporation (STC), Deven Vythelingum, died after facing intense stress levels at work. He had a detailed understanding of all purchasing matters and contracts issued by the STC over several decades; his phone disappeared.

=== Maudhoo & aquaculture permit ===
In January 2021, Sulakshna Runjeet (representing Supam Export Ltd) wrote to Prime Minister Pravind Jugnauth to complain about the non-renewal of her aquaculture permit. Runjeet alleged that in 2020, the Fisheries Minister Sudhir Maudhoo had organised to send his neighbour and friend Kurrumchund (owner of Suchi Technologies) to coerce her company to pay "business protection money", otherwise her license would not be renewed. Under the modified arrangement proposed by Minister Maudhoo, the firm Supam Export Ltd would have to operate under the new firm Suchi Technologies, thereby enabling the latter to collect commission through income earned by Runjeet's firm. She requested further investigation by the ICAC and also called for Maudhoo's resignation.

=== Pandora Papers ===
Sattar Hajee Abdoula, the chairman of SBM Holdings, which owns the State Bank of Mauritius, featured in the Pandora Papers published in October 2021 by the International Consortium of Investigative Journalists (ICIJ). He is listed amongst the "business people". As the CEO of the Mauritian branch of Grant Thornton International, Sattar Hajee Abdoula has also been the administrator of bankrupt airline carrier Air Mauritius. Between 2009 and 2011, Sattar Hajee Abdoula bought shares in Light Rise International (BVI) and Falcon Power Ltd (BVI), two companies incorporated in the British Virgin Islands. Mauritian Yuvraj Thacoor was the original founder of Light Rise International since April 2009. In 2012, Regula Ltd, a structure created by the Deutsche Bank in the BVI, bought all of Thacoor's and Hajee Abdoula's shares in both Light Rise and Falcon Power. Following investigations into money laundering involving Regula Ltd, the Deutsche Bank was eventually fined €15 million.

=== Data Snooping, Sniffing & Snooping on SAFE cable ===
On 30 June 2022 Sherry Singh, the CEO of Mauritius Telecom (MT), publicly announced his resignation as part of a heavily mediatized campaign which was followed a day later by a live interview on social media where he revealed that Prime Minister Pravind Jugnauth had given him firm instructions in October 2021 to allow a "third party" to install monitoring equipment to snoop internet traffic at the landing station of the South Africa Far East (SAFE) submarine cable at Baie Jacotet in Mauritius. Sherry Singh had been a close associate of Pravind Jugnauth and his wife, Kobita Jugnauth. Sherry Singh dubbed the latter Lady Macbeth, a reference to the leading character in Shakespeare's tragedy Macbeth. Kapil Reesaul was appointed as CEO by MT's administrative council to replace Sherry Singh on 19 July 2022. Reesaul returned from Canada to start as MT's new CEO on 1 August 2022. By 19 July 2022, the CTO of Mauritius Telecom, Girish Guddoy, also resigned. But by 4 August 2022, Guddoy had withdrawn his resignation and returned to Mauritius Telecom in the newly created and more lucrative position of Chief Service Officer (CSO). On 20 July 2022, the chairman and several directors of Mauritius Telecom were removed (Nayen Koomar Ballah, Dheerendra Dabee, Dev Manraj, Koosiram Conhye and Ramesh Bheekoo). They represented 59.0% of the government's ownership of Mauritius Telecom as the state owns 33.49%, SBM Holdings Ltd owns 19% and the National Pensions Fund owns 6.55%. Pravind Jugnauth later confirmed that he had himself requested technicians from India to be dispatched for survey and interventions, but the installation of physical equipment would be excluded. Several visits were made at Baie Jacotet by the Indian technical team, and CCTV footage of their presence in April 2022 was revealed by ex-CEO Sherry Singh during an interview broadcast on social media on Friday, 22 July 2022. Concerns were raised that the owners of the SAFE consortium were unaware of such surveys and interventions. On 5 July 2022, when the opposition leader asked Pravind Jugnauth for more details in Parliament, his microphone was switched off.

=== CWA Maunthrooa emergency procurement ===
Despite his involvement in the 2006-2013 Boskalis bribery scandal, Prakash Maunthrooa was nominated as the chief executive of the Central Water Authority (CWA) in August 2022. Within one month of this political nomination, it was suggested that, to avoid the need for calling for competitive tenders, Rs 7 billion of contract would be allocated to an Indian construction firm as Emergency Procurement in order to attempt to deliver the MSM's 2019 electoral promise of an uninterrupted supply of potable water to all parts of Mauritius.

=== Presidential pardon of the Commissioner of Police Dip's embezzler son ===
On 20 December 2022, President Roopun approved a recommendation made by the Commission on the Prerogative of Mercy (Mercy Commission), which enabled the remission of the 12-month prison sentence delivered against Avinash Chandra Prakash Dip by the Intermediate Court into a Rs100,000 fine. Avinash Chandra Prakash Dip is the son of Commissioner of Police Anil Kumar Dip and had been sentenced to 12 months of jail time for his involvement in the embezzlement in June 2008 of Rs 3 million at the detriment of a local firm (Diadeis Maurice Ltée). Chandra Prakash Dip used to work at Barclays Bank before joining accountancy firm De Chazal Du Mée (DCDM). After leaving Barclays Bank Dip contacted an ex-colleague, Avinash Kona Yernkinnowdu, to gather details, which Dip and his accomplices (Chitranjun Hauroo and Mahmad Razik Aumeerally) later used for fraudulent purposes. Dip's accomplices, Chitranjun Hauroo and Mahmad Razik Aumeerally, had also been found guilty and were sentenced to serve jail time in February 2018. In November 2022, Dip had appealed the sentence, but Chief Justice Rehana Mungly-Gulbul had rejected any recourse to the Privy Council. In January 2023, the Director of Public Prosecutions applied for a judicial review of the remission.

In September 2011, Chandra Prakash Dip was identified as the kingpin of a separate embezzlement case involving Rs 80 million of the Bramer Bank. This led to the arrest of his father, Anil Kumar Dip (then Assistant Commissioner of Police), in December 2013, as well as Chandra Prakash Dip's mother, Chandny Dip, in 2011, as the latter's bank account was being used to receive the embezzled funds at the expense of Bramer Bank.

=== MIC Loans scandals ===
In April 2025, former Bank of Mauritius governor Harvesh Seegolam was arrested and subsequently charged with fraud in connection with an alleged embezzlement of 300 million Mauritian rupees (approximately US$6.7 million) from the Mauritius Investment Corporation (MIC), a state fund established to support businesses during the COVID-19 pandemic. Seegolam, who served under the previous administration, denied wrongdoing and was released on bail. The investigation is led by the Financial Crimes Commission.

=== Sithanen-Menlo Park-MIC-BOM-audio leak scandal ===
In September 2025 the Governor of the Bank of Mauritius, Rama Sithanen, was forced to resign following the Prime Minister's request to do so, due to a growing number of ethical matters which were tarnishing the central bank's reputation. He also resigned as President of the Financial Services Commission (FSC). This followed the release on social media of audio recording of threats being made to Aditi Boolell and Stephane Adam of Menlo Park by Rama Sithanen's son Tevin. Journalist Narain Jasodanand was also arrested and released following Sithanen's complaint. On 28 November 2025, Tevin Sithanen was arrested after being questioned by the Anti-Money Laundering Unit du Central Criminal Investigation Department (CCID). He was charged with Breach of ICTA (Information and Communication Technologies Act).

=== Political interference in the Hossenally human trafficking and revenge porn scandal ===
In April 2025, police arrested Al Madani Hossenally, a 43-year-old clerk residing at Morcellement Raffray in Pailles, charged with no less than 8 offences, namely human trafficking, child ill treatment, causing a child to be sexually abused, sodomy, revenge pornography, sequestration, conspiracy and possession of property bearing a mark of the government or a third party. The number of offences is expected to reach 15. At least 4 of Hossenally's wives and ex-wives eventually came forward to reveal how he had organised to have them raped, sodomised, sexually abused and forced to have sexual intercourse with numerous men against their consent. Even his brother Ackbar Hossenally broke his silence by making public revelations in the press. After one of his victims tried to report him to police in 2023, Al Madani Hossenally leaked nude photos and videos of her on social media to discourage her from further complaining. Finally, as more lewd videos were leaked in 2025, the ex-wife reported the crimes to police officer Rajesh Moorghen at the Plaine Verte police station. However, in late May 2025, Officer Moorghen withdrew himself from the Hossenally investigation as several senior police officers exerted their influence on a number of his investigations, mainly due to political interference from Navin Ramgoolam's Alliance du Changement government. Moorghen wrote that the magistrate was concerned about the adverse impact of political interference on such cases, and mentioned that he could no longer investigate these crimes in an impartial manner.

=== Promotion of Ajay Gunness's wife within ECCEA ===
In the National Assembly Adrien Duval questioned the Minister of Education Mahend Gungapersad in October 2025 about the recruitment criteria for the appointment of the Director of Early Childhood Care and Education Authority (ECCEA). This revealed the huge monthly salary of Rs 160,000 allocated to this position. Concerns have been raised within the ECCEA about the proposed candidates for this coveted position as they do not satisfy the minimum recruitment criteria, namely in terms of qualifications and experience. Ajay Gunness then revealed to the press that it's indeed his wife Roshnee Gunness who's been recently appointed as Officer-in-Charge of the ECCEA. He also denied having any influence in her promotion and explained that his wife started as a volunteer at Médine–Camp de Masque pre-school and the Bonne-Mère primary school.

=== Arrest of Junior Minister Véronique Leu-Govind's husband ===
Yogajee Govind, also known as Gulshan Govind, the 42-year old husband of Véronique Leu-Govind, was arrested on 31 July 2026 by the Anti Drug and Smuggling Unit (ADSU) of the Western Division of the Mauritius Police Force for his involvement, with suspect Ravindra Chimajee, in a drug trafficking network after 155.7 kilograms of cannabis (worth Rs 233.55 million) were seized by law enforcement authorities of Reunion Island. When the couple's house at Case Noyale was searched by police, they discovered 4 marijuana plants growing on the roof, as well as an amount of synthetic opioid drug methadone. They also seized the couple's SUV, a GWM Tank worth Rs 2.8 million. Gulshan Govind's history in drug trafficking was also brought to light, given that he was convicted and jailed for 1 year in 2008 for trafficking marijuana. The scandal also cast light over Benjamin Leu, Véronique Leu-Govind's brother, who spent 2.5 years in jail in Reunion Island after being found guilty of cannabis drug trafficking in 2023. The Financial Crimes Commission (FCC) also started to investigate the family's involvement in money laundering. On 4 August 2026 in the National Assembly Joe Lesjongard, the Leader of the Opposition, questioned Prime Minister Navin Ramgoolam about the unusually high number of trips made by Véronique Leu-Govind with her drug trafficker husband to Reunion Island since 2025, and their access to the airport's VIP Lounge. However, Navin Ramgoolam replied that the couple's access to the VIP Lounge as "absolutely normal".

=== Use of public funds to renovate President Dharam Gokhool's private home ===
Activist Raouf Khodabaccus of Linion Moris revealed on 28 July 2026 that a large number of unjustified renovation tasks were being undertaken at President Dharam Gokhool's private residence using public funds. Not only are such use of public funds unusual, but the initial estimated cost of Rs 17.3 millions have blown out to Rs 20.3 millions. To deflect blame and attention from this scandal, Dharam Gokhool blamed the Prime Minister's Office for taking the decision to renovate his private home located in Quatre Bornes. Furthermore, Ajay Gunness, minister of National Infrastructure launched a defamation case against Raouf Khodabaccus, claiming that his reputation is being soiled by the revelations.

== See also ==
- Independent Commission Against Corruption (Mauritius)
- Corruption by country
- Corruption Perceptions Index
- International Anti-Corruption Academy
- Group of States Against Corruption
- International Anti-Corruption Day
- ISO 37001 Anti-bribery management systems
- United Nations Convention against Corruption
- OECD Anti-Bribery Convention
- Transparency International
- Mauritius Leaks
- List of people named in the Pandora Papers
- Pandora Papers
