= Siddick Chady =

Mauritian politician

Dr Siddick Chady MP

Best Loser (Constituency No. 19)
- In office 1991–1995

2nd Member for Constituency No. 19
- In office 1995–2000

2nd Member for Constituency No. 3
- In office 2000 – 2004 (resigned)

Personal details
- Born: 15 May 1951
- Died: 23 June 2024 (aged 73)
- Party: Front Solidarité Mauricien; Parti Travailliste; MMM

Mohummud Siddick Chady (born in 1951), most commonly known as Siddick Chady was a Mauritian physician, politician, and former minister. He served jail time after making news headlines for several years for his involvement in L'Affaire Boskalis, a bribery and political scandal.

== Early life, education & career ==
Chady grew up in Rose Hill and travelled to Europe to study medicine. His family owned a number of businesses including Cinema ABC, and Blockbuster Video Network (BVN).

== Family life ==
Siddick Chady was married to Naserah Bibi Vavra, also known as La Reine de Plaine Verte and Lady Di who has been married four times, her first marriage occurring when she was 14 years of age. In 2006 Vavra married drug trafficker Siddick Islam, also known as Ti Nerf. The latter was convicted and is serving a 30 year sentence at the Beau Bassin prison. In 2021 Naserah Bibi Vavra pleaded guilty to 10 charges of money laundering connected to drug trafficking and she was fined nearly Rs 1 Million by the Financial Crimes Division of the Intermediary Court.

Siddick was also married to Hannah Bibi Chady and she was a director of Blockbuster Video Network.

== Political career ==
Chady's political career started at the 1991 General Elections as a candidate of Alliance Parti Travailliste/PMSD in Constituency No. 19 - Stanley and Rose Hill. He was defeated in that constituency by Jayen Cuttaree, Paul Bérenger, and Jean Claude De L'Estrac of Alliance MSM/MMM. However after the elections he was nominated into the Legislative Assembly as a Best Loser.

At the 1995 General Elections he was elected as a candidate of Alliance Parti Travailliste/MMM in Constituency No. 19, alongside Jayen Cuttaree, and Paul Bérenger. Until 2000 Chady served as Minister Environment, Human Resource Development and Employment.

At the 2000 General Elections Siddick Chady changed constituencies and was candidate of Alliance Parti Travailliste-PMXD in Constituency No. 3 - Port Louis Maritime and Port Louis East. He was elected, along with Samioullah Lauthan (MSM-MMM) and Mohammad Nanhuck (MSM-MMM). Chady's election as a member of the Parti Travailliste in Constituency No. 3 was regarded as unusual as it had been a stronghold of rival party MMM. However, Siddick Chady did not complete his 5-year-term as he resigned from the National Assembly in 2004 in order to resolve problems arising in his private business ventures. Chady's resignation did not trigger by-elections.

At the July 2005 General Elections Chady was a candidate of Alliance Sociale in Constituency No. 3 but was he neither elected nor nominated Best Loser this time. As he was still a friend of Navin Ramgoolam, the latter nominated him as president of the Mauritius Ports Authority (MPA).

In April 2012 Cehl Meeah, leader of the Front Solidarité Mauricienne, introduced Siddick Chady as ancien travailliste and his special guest at FSM's press conference. Chady stated that the FSM could challenge the traditional parties (MSM, MMM, PTr and PMSD), and that the existing political system was in urgent need of reform. He also called for protection of the Best Loser System, and he stated that Mauritians living abroad should be able to vote at Mauritian elections. The following month the FSM confirmed that Siddick Chady had joined them as they planned to form an alliance with L.Ramsahok's Parti Action Libérale et Eliézer François' party Mouvement Authentique Mauricien (MAM).

== Bribery scandal ==
Soon after his political appointment as the head of the MPA, Siddick Chady became embroiled in the bribery scandal known as L’affaire Boskalis. The scandal broke out when in 2008 when a local weekly newspaper published a copy of a facsimile from Boskalis (dated 10 October 2006) showing the transfer of funds to Chady's bank account. He received between Rs 1 Million and Rs 3 Millions in bribes from Dutch firm Boskalis which was awarded the Rs 0.5 Billion Canal Anglais harbour dredging contract in 2006. His then-wife Hannah Bibi Chady, and municipal councillor Bashir Nazeer, both directors of Chady's family business Video Blockbuster Network Ltd (VBN), were charged with money laundering as VBN's bank account was used to receive Boskalis' bribes. Coincidentally Siddick Chady claimed to have lost his passport in India, exactly when ICAC started their investigation. Navin Ramgoolam's advisor Gilbert Philippe was also arrested for receiving a bribe from Boskalis. Eventually Siddick Chady was found guilty of bribery (receiving gift for a corrupt purpose) and was sentenced to 15 months in jail. He served his sentence from 29 July 2023 and was released in May 2024 after serving only 8 months of jail time, as due to good conduct and service he only had to serve two-thirds of this sentence.

A few days after his release from jail Siddick Chady was interviewed by Nawaz Noorbux, and he decried the act of betrayal by his former friend Navin Ramgoolam who misguided and deserted him after the start of the Boslakis scandal. Chady expressed his disappointment about Ramgoolam's ingratitude, especially as Chady's family had been instrumental during the launch of Navin Ramgoolam's political career in the early 1990s. Navin Ramgoolam's immature obsession with seeking payback after Siddick Chady's decision to leave Parti Travailliste and his growing proximity with Cehl Meeah's FSM were also mentioned during the interview.

== Death ==
Siddick Chady died on Sunday 24 June 2024 evening at the age of 73 at the Artémis Clinic in Curepipe, about 40 days after his release from prison. Unlike previous high profile inmates, Chady refused to leave his jail cell to spend time in hospital, despite being ill during his 8 months in jail.
