= St Louis gate =

Scandal in Mauritius

Saint Louis Gate or St Louis Gate or Turbine Gate is a 2020 corruption case involving political appointees of the Government of Mauritius, employees of the Central Electricity Board and Danish firm Burmeister & Wain Scandinavian Contractor (BWSC).

== Background ==
In 2014 a tender package was issued by the CEB for a major upgrade of an existing diesel power station at St. Louis, on the outskirts of capital city Port Louis. Burmeister & Wain Scandinavian Contractor (BWSC) of Denmark was awarded the contract by the Mauritian power-generating entity CEB (CEB). In 2018 a whistleblower alerted the financier African Development Bank (ADB) that the award to BWSC occurred after bribes had been received by several CEB employees through an intermediary of BWSC who owns a Mauritian construction company. ADB investigated the claims and thus excluded BWSC from all future work for 21 months.

== Revelations ==
In early June 2020 Leader of Opposition Arvin Boolell raised this issue in the Parliament. Shortly after the entire Management Team of CEB was stood down on 14 June 2020 by the Prime Minister Pravind Jugnauth who appointed a new Board of Management. As more details surrounding the St Louis Gate scandal became public the Opposition highlighted the need for a detailed enquiry and also requested the dismissal or resignation of the Deputy Prime Minister involved. Observers also questioned the basis for the significant capital expenditures, given the remote risk of a power black-out on the island.

In July 2020 the contracting firm PAD & Company Limited (PAD & Co. Ltd.) was placed under voluntary administration and firm BDO was appointed as administrator after facing liquidity problems following revelations of fake bank guarantees for civil works contract of the order of Rs 210 Millions, as well as earlier revelations of the firm's involvement in the BWSC-CEB-ADB St Louis gate scandal. Shamshir Mukoon former director of CEB and Alain Hao Thyn Voon, former director of contracting firm PAD CO have also been interrogated by ICAC investigators.

On 05 September 2020 Bertrand Lagesse was arrested in Mauritius for contravening Articles 3 (1) (b), 6 and 8 of the Financial Intelligence and Anti-Money Laundering Act since May 2016. Bertrand Lagesse has been the consulting engineer for Burmeister & Wain Scandinavian Contractor (BWSC) which is the principal contractor of the CEB in this scandal. He is suspected of having acquired a property worth 212,948 Euros (Rs 10 Millions) as well as for holding Rs 8.17 Millions in a bank account using proceeds of corruption. However the investigators have discovered that Bertand Lagesse had already erased his telephone and computer records.
