= Caisse Noire Affair =

Corporate scandal at Air Mauritius

The Caisse Noire Affair was a scandal which exposed the illegal practices within the national airline carrier Air Mauritius between 1981 and 2001.

== History ==
The illicit bank account had been set up following Sir Seewoosagur Ramgoolam's request for funds in 1981 to assist Advance which was the ailing propaganda newspaper of the Labour Party.

In October 2001 Gérard Tyack, who was General Manager and Financial Director of Air Mauritius, revealed details of the Swiss bank account in Geneva for the payment to officials of Air Mauritius, journalists and politicians. The funds had also been used to finance political newspapers, electoral campaigns, purchase of private cars for Sir Harry's wife and their daughters' overseas studies. The existence of the illicit Swiss bank account had been earlier revealed by whistle blower employees Vijay Poonoosamy, Mike Seetaramadoo et C. Bastien who were then sacked by the management. Former MP and trade unionist Jack Bizlall assisted them in making the revelations to authorities.

On 22 February 2002 Sir Harry Tirvengadum and other officials of the national airline company and Rogers Limited were arrested and prosecuted. The cash-book produced by Gérard Tyack had been deemed to be genuine by magistrates Benjamin Marie-Joseph, Nicolas Ohsan-Bellepeau and Renuka Devi Dabee. The cash-book revealed details of funds that had been transferred to the names of well known Mauritian politicians and businessmen. In a separate matter whereby Rama Valayden was being prosecuted for defaming Jayen Cuttarree Gérard Tyack revealed that he had paid Jayen Cuttarree from the illicit bank account in order to finance the MMM's propaganda newspaper Le Nouveau Militant. Tyack further detailed that it had become customary for him to frequently pay various political figures sums ranging from Rs 20,000 to Rs 500,000 from the same account.

In December 2007 the prosecution against Sir Harry Tirvengadum was suspended under Navin Ramgoolam's PTr-PMXD-VF-MR-MMSM coalition government as magistrates deemed that his poor health would not give him a fair trial. He was being sued by the management of Air Mauritius for swindling Rs 85 Millions from 1984 to 1996.

In 2010 as Harry Tirvengadum's health had improved the prosecution case was resumed. Although ex-CEO Soobhiraj Bungsraz only headed Air Mauritius for 2 months he managed to convince the Director of Public Prosecutions (DPP) to re-open the case against Tirvengadum. Bungsraz even consulted with Tirvengadum shortly before leaving the company to migrate to Australia.

== Aftermath ==
Gérard Tyack spent 2 years in jail. Although he was sentenced to 6 months in jail in 2008, Robert Rivalland of Rogers Limited was acquitted in 2015, where as the prosecution against Sir Harry Tirvengadum was placed on hold as he complained of ill health.

== See also ==
- Corruption in Mauritius
