= Economic Crime Office =

Economic Crime Office (ECO)
Agency overview
- Formed: February 4, 2000
- Dissolved: December 10, 2001
- Jurisdiction: Government of Mauritius
- Headquarters: Port Louis, Mauritius
- Agency executive: Indira Manrakhan, Director-General

The Economic Crime Office (ECO) was the anti-corruption agency of Mauritius. It was intended to investigate allegations of corruption in the private and public sectors. The ECO was headed by its Director-General.

== History and Establishment ==
ECO was established under the Economic Crime and Anti-Money Laundering Act (2000) to comply with the 1988 United Nations (UN) convention. Under the Act money laundering became a punishable crime and it set out the process for reporting suspicious transactions. ECO came into existence when the Labour Party-MMM was in government, a few months prior to the September 2000 elections after which the MSM-MMM coalition was elected to office. The ECO was headed by Indira Manrakhan.

== Track record ==
A total of 35 cases of fraud and corruption were investigated by ECO between the months of July and December 2000. It had referred 29 of these cases to the Director of Public Prosecution (DPP) for further action. ECO was also investigating two ministers of the previous government.

== Dismantling of ECO ==
After being in existence for less than 2 years the ECO was dismantled by the new MSM-MMM coalition government. In December 2001 ECO's director general was also dismissed. In April 2002 the replacement Prevention of Corruption Act 2002 (PoCA) was enacted to enable the creation of a new body called Independent Commission Against Corruption (Mauritius) which is more commonly known as ICAC.

== See also ==
- Corruption in Mauritius
- Politics of Mauritius
