= Dev Manraj =

Mauritian advisor (1949–2024)

Dharam Dev Manraj (30 March 1949 - 17 June 2024) was a prominent figure of Mauritius. After becoming a fellow of the Association of Chartered Certified Accounts, he obtained a Post-Graduate Diploma at the International Institute for Management Development. He was married and had two children.

Dev Manraj was very active in the edification of the modern framework of Mauritius, the setting up of major independent Authorities and more recently contributed towards the development of Mauritius as a Cyber Island.

Dev Manraj was the mastermind behind most of the major projects of Mauritius, including the Ebene Cybercity, when he served as Chairman of the Business Park of Mauritius Ltd. He contributed inter alia in the setting up of the Financial Services Commission, the Mauritius Leasing Company Ltd. the National Transport Corporation and the State Investment Corporation amongst others. He has also participated in the drafting of the recent Budget Speeches, formulation of Capital and Recurrent budgets, fiscal policies. He was also an advisor to Sir Anerood Jugnauth, former prime minister of Mauritius.
