= Financial Crimes Commission (Mauritius) =

Agency of the Government of Mauritius

Financial Crimes Commission (FCC)
Agency overview
- Formed: 29 March 2024
- Jurisdiction: Government of Mauritius
- Headquarters: Port Louis, Mauritius
- Agency executive: Navin Beekarry, Director-General
- Website: www.icac.mu

The Financial Crimes Commission (FCC) (French: Commission des crimes financiers), previously Independent Commission Against Corruption is the Anti-corruption agency of Mauritius. The FCC is headed by the Director-General.

== History and establishment ==
Financial Crimes Commission

The Financial Crimes Commission (Mauritius) (FCC) in Mauritius was established under the Financial Crimes Commission Act on 29 March 2024. It was created to consolidate and enhance the country's efforts to combat financial crimes by replacing and assuming the functions of three key agencies: the Independent Commission Against Corruption(ICAC), the Asset Recovery Investigation Division (ARID) of the Financial Intelligence Unit, and the Integrity Reporting Services Agency (IRSA).

The formation of the FCC reflects a significant restructuring of Mauritius's approach to handling financial crimes, including corruption, money laundering, and fraud. This new body integrates the responsibilities of the defunct agencies to ensure a more coordinated and effective enforcement of anti-corruption and financial crime laws. It also introduces new powers and techniques for investigating and prosecuting these crimes, such as enhanced surveillance capabilities and the authority to request financial information from institutions under judicial oversight.

The creation of the FCC is part of a broader legislative framework that repeals and replaces older laws, streamlining and strengthening the legal basis for fighting financial crimes in Mauritius. This effort is aimed at ensuring greater accountability, transparency, and effectiveness in the country's financial regulatory environment.

Independent Commission Against Corruption

ICAC was established under the Prevention of Corruption Act 2002 (PoCA). It was created to replace the defunct Economic Crime Office (ECO) which was dismantled by the MSM-MMM government in December 2001. ICAC has 3 main functions;

- Investigation: enforcement of the laws against corruption.
- Prevention: elimination of opportunities for corruption from systems and procedures.
- Education: prevention of corruption through public education and support.

ICAC strategic objectives are to;

- Implement obligations in the SADC Protocol and the UN Convention against corruption as far as they relate to prevention by adapting corruption prevention strategies to suit the Mauritian environment;
- Promote integrity, accountability, sound management of public affairs and responsible behaviour at organisational and individual levels and prompt corruption prevention cultures in the public sector;
- Maintain a high public profile and "mind share" within the community by enhancing public confidence and trust in the public sector; and
- Promote and strengthen the development of mechanisms to prevent and detect corruption in public and private sector.

== Controversies ==
In 2015, an arrest warrant issued for the director of public prosecutions sparked a debate about the impartiality of the government's anti-corruption campaign. A board member of the ICAC, handed in her resignation, claiming that the institution was in the process of going against the country's democratic principles, apparently implying that the commission was not acting independently. In 2006, ICAC initiated an investigation to dismantle a network of University of Mauritius lecturers moonlighting in other universities. A commissioner of the Financial Crimes Commission resigned after it was disclosed that he may have intervened in the investigation of an ex-adviser of the President of Madagascar. The ex-commissioner was subsequently arrested.

== See also ==
- Corruption in Mauritius
- Politics of Mauritius
