= Jayen Cuttaree =

Mauritian politician (1941–2018)

Jaya Krishna Cuttaree GCSK
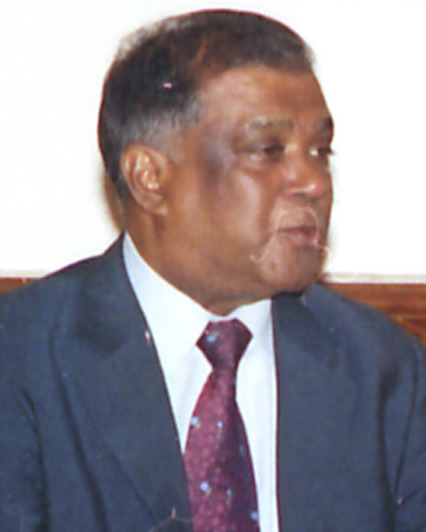

Personal details
- Born: June 22, 1941 Rose Hill, Mauritius
- Died: December 19, 2018 (aged 77)
- Occupation: Politician, Minister, and Member of Constituency No. 19 (Stanley / Rose Hill)

Jaya Krishna Cuttaree, GCSK (June 22, 1941 - December 19, 2018), more commonly known as Jayen Cuttaree, was a Mauritian politician.

== Early life and education ==
Cuttaree was born in Rose Hill, Mauritius, to Indian immigrants who had landed in Mauritius in the 19th century when it was a British colony.

Cuttaree attended Royal College Curepipe until being granted a scholarship in Scotland to attend the University of Edinburgh. There, he earned a BSc in Forestry. Subsequently, he studied Plant Ecology from the University of Uppsala in Sweden, earning a PhD. Later on in life, he completed a law degree.

Cuttaree is the brother-in-law of Dev Virahsawmy, who made history by becoming the first MMM politician to be elected to the Legislative Assembly in 1970. Dev's father, Simadree, was a minister of the Labour Party who later defected to rival party MTD.

== Political career ==
Cuttaree was a member of Constituency No. 19 (Stanley / Rose Hill) from 1982 to 2010. He was appointed Minister for the first time in 1982 following the legislative elections that year. He was appointed Minister of Labour. Cuttaree then served as Minister of Lands and Housing after the victory of the MSM-MMM alliance in the 1991 Legislative Assembly.

Following the 2000 general elections, he was appointed Minister of Industry and Trade. In 2005, Cuttaree was a candidate for the position of Director General of the WTO as a candidate of the African Union.

Cuttaree's book, Behind The Purple Curtain: A Political Autobiography, was premiered in December 2011, at a showing hosted by l'Opposition leader Paul Bérenger.

== Controversies ==
=== 2001 closing down of Economic Crime Office (ECO) to avoid investigation ===
Indira Manrakhan, the former director of ECO, explained how she received information that led her to believe there were reasonable grounds for an investigation on Jayen Cuttaree, who was in the running as future MMM President of the Republic. ECO suspected that Cuttaree had assisted Harry Tirvengadum to illegally annex State Land next to his Floreal property. However, the MSM-MMM government intervened by closing down ECO, which was replaced by the Independent Commission Against Corruption (ICAC). At the time of its closure, ECO was investigating other Mauritian politicians under similar suspicions.

=== 2001 Valayden's claims of unpaid bills at Maritim Hotel ===
Attorney General Rama Valayden also alleged during a press conference that Cuttaree had not paid the Maritim Hotel after his lavish birthday party on June 24, 2001. Cuttaree denied these allegations.

=== 2005 Air Mauritius Caisse Noire scandal ===
In 2005, Gérard Tyack (former financial director of Air Mauritius) revealed that he had given money to Cuttaree from the Air Mauritius secret fund, also known as the scandalous Caisse Noire Affair. The money was meant for the newspaper of the Mauritian Militant Movement (MMM), Le Nouveau Militant. During the cross examination of Tyack, he revealed that he had mentioned this transaction in his statement to the Economic Crime Office (ECO).
