= Ajay Gunness =

Mauritian politician

Govindranath Gunness
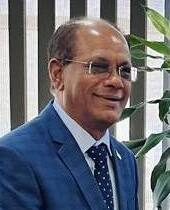
- Ajay Gunness in 2025

Minister of National Infrastructure
- Incumbent
- Assumed office 22 November 2024
- Prime Minister: Navin Ramgoolam

Personal details
- Born: 16 September 1959 (age 66) Médine-Camp-de-Masque, British Mauritius
- Party: Mauritian Militant Movement
- Spouse: Roshnee Gunness
- Children: Diya and Rushil
- Education: Edinburgh Napier University
- Occupation: Schoolteacher

Govindranath Gunness (born 16 September 1959), most commonly known as Ajay Gunness, is a Mauritian politician from the Mauritian Militant Movement (MMM). He has served as Minister of National Infrastructure since 2024.

== Education and career before politics ==
Ajay Gunness grew up in a family of 4 children in Médine-Camp-de-Masque, his father was a labourer at the ministry of Agriculture and his mother reared cows whilst tending to housework. He completed his secondary schooling at Mauritius College in Curepipe. He then worked as Pay Clerk at the Tea Development Authority. Due to his involvement in activism, he was then punitively transferred from Wooton to Bel-Air-Rivière-Sèche where he was ordered to pluck tea leaves, which he refused and resigned from the Civil Service. In 1985 he married Roshnee from St Julien d'Hotman. He eventually obtained a Diploma in Teaching, a PGCE (Business studies) from the Mauritius Institute of Education as well as qualification in Accounting (ACCA). He also graduated with a Bachelor of Arts degree in Economics with Management Studies from Napier University. He worked as a teacher at Quartier Militaire College and College du St Esprit. In 2000 he took unpaid leave from teaching to focus entirely on active politics.

== Scandals ==
=== 2006 DWC renovation scandal and attempt to avoid police arrest ===
In January 2005, Ajay Gunness became minister of Public Infrastructure of the MSM-MMM ruling government after Anil Bachoo's resignation from the MSM. Within 2 weeks of starting in this position, Gunness rushed in a request to renovate his office, kitchen, waiting room, corridor, toilets and his advisors' offices. However, all renovation works were completed by 14 April 2005, just 1 day after the award of contract. After noticing serious anomalies in the way that the contract was awarded by the Development Works Corporation (DWC), and also given that renovation works had already started before the allocation of the contract, a group of aggrieved civil servants lodged a complaint to the ICAC. The General Manager of the DWC, Dhaneshwar Soobrah, was arrested for public official using his position for gratification to benefit contractor Archinter Services Ltd. Despite Paul Bérenger's attempt in the National Assembly to defend Gunness, by 29 November 2005 the DPP authorised a request to have Ajay Gunness arrested. The ICAC requested Commissioner of Police Ramanooj Goopalsingh to execute the warrant for his arrest. Thus police officers of the Major Crimes Investigation Team (MCIT) under Superintendent Prem Raddhoa proceeded to raid the minister's home located in Floreal. But his wife Roshnee, standing from the balcony, refused to give them access as Ajay Gunness and his lawyers frantically made telephone calls to cancel his imminent arrest. As they were scaling the fence, police received orders to retreat.

=== 2017 obstruction of a police officer by Ajay Gunness ===
Ajay Gunness, when he was the secretary general of the MMM and a member of Parliament, intervened at the Flic-en-Flac police station to make an attempt to release his brother-in-law Sanjay, a resident of Montagne-Blanche. The latter was under police arrest for drink-driving. During a routine check on 15 April 2017 police officers of the Road Safety Unit breath-tested Sanjay, who was driving a car. As his blood alcohol level exceeded the legal limit by 11 milligrams, he was arrested and locked up. However, Ajay Gunness soon arrived there and instructed Sanjay, to ignore the police officers' instructions, before leading Sanjay out of the station without authorisation from the police officers on duty. A policeman on duty reported that Ajay Gunness also implored them to drop the case. They both left in Sanjay's car, which was being driven by his wife. Charges of Obstructing Police Officer under section 13G of the Police Act or Molesting Public Officer under section 3 of the Public Officers Protection Act and Outrage against an agent of civil Authority under section 159 of the Criminal Code were contemplated against Gunness. After initial investigations, the latter was reconvened by police for further questioning, and he was placed under arrest. Reference to this incident was made in the National Assembly as a bad example of political intervention to protect one's drunk relative.

=== 2025 Wife's appointment within government body ECCEA ===
In October 2025 Adrien Duval questioned the Minister of Education Mahend Gungapersad in the National Assembly about the recruitment criteria for the appointment of the Director of Early Childhood Care and Education Authority (ECCEA), and the huge monthly salary of Rs 160,000 allocated to the holder of this position. Current employees of the ECCEA are concerned that the proposed candidates for this coveted position do not satisfy any of the minimum recruitment criteria, namely in terms of qualifications and experience. Soon afterwards, Ajay Gunness revealed to the press that it's indeed his wife Roshnee Gunness who's been recently appointed as Officer-in-Charge of the ECCEA. He also denied having any influence in her promotion and explained that his wife started as a volunteer at Médine–Camp de Masque pre-school and the Bonne-Mère primary school.
