= National Transport Corporation =

Government owned bus company serving Mauritius Island

Corporation de Nationale Transport
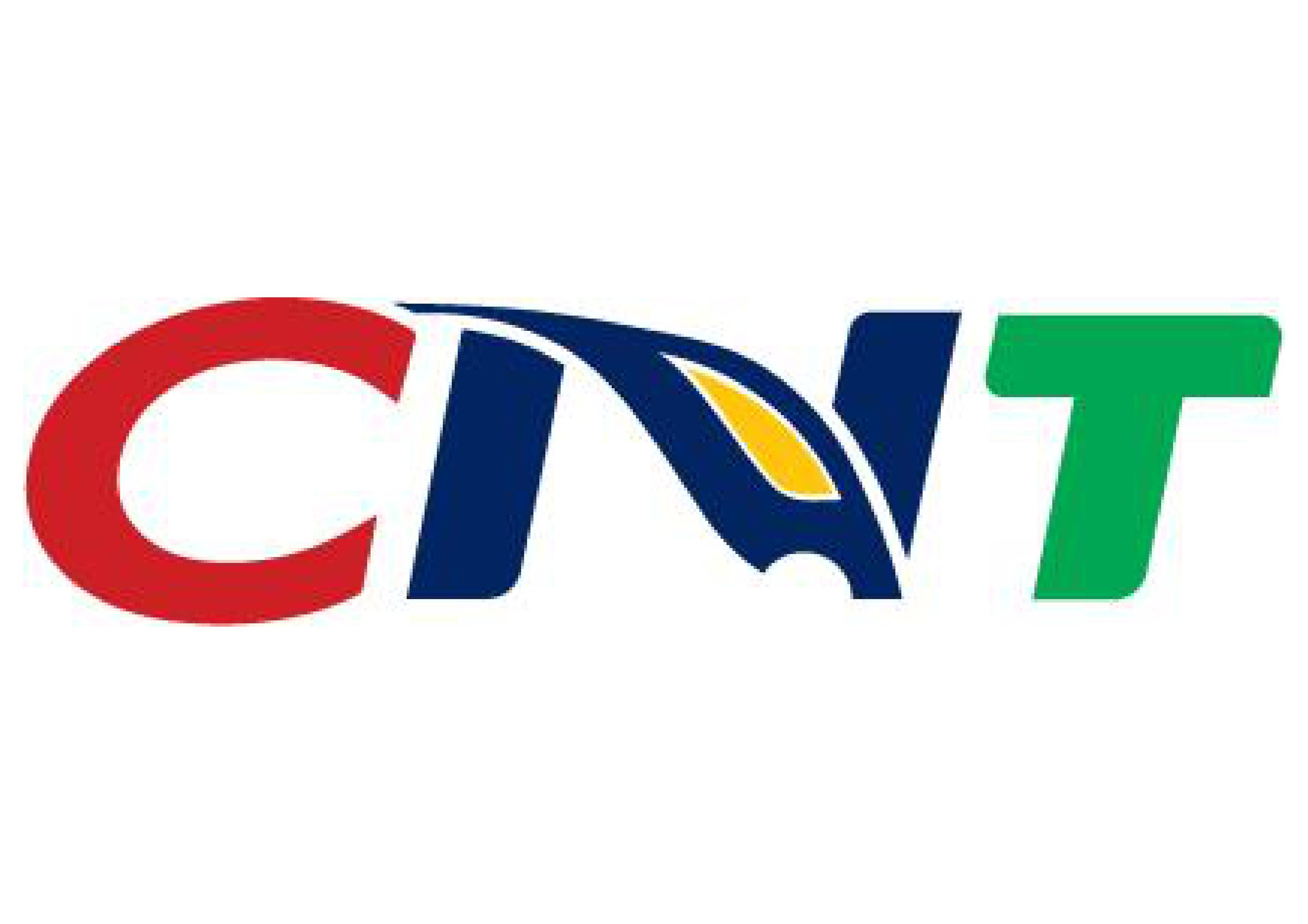

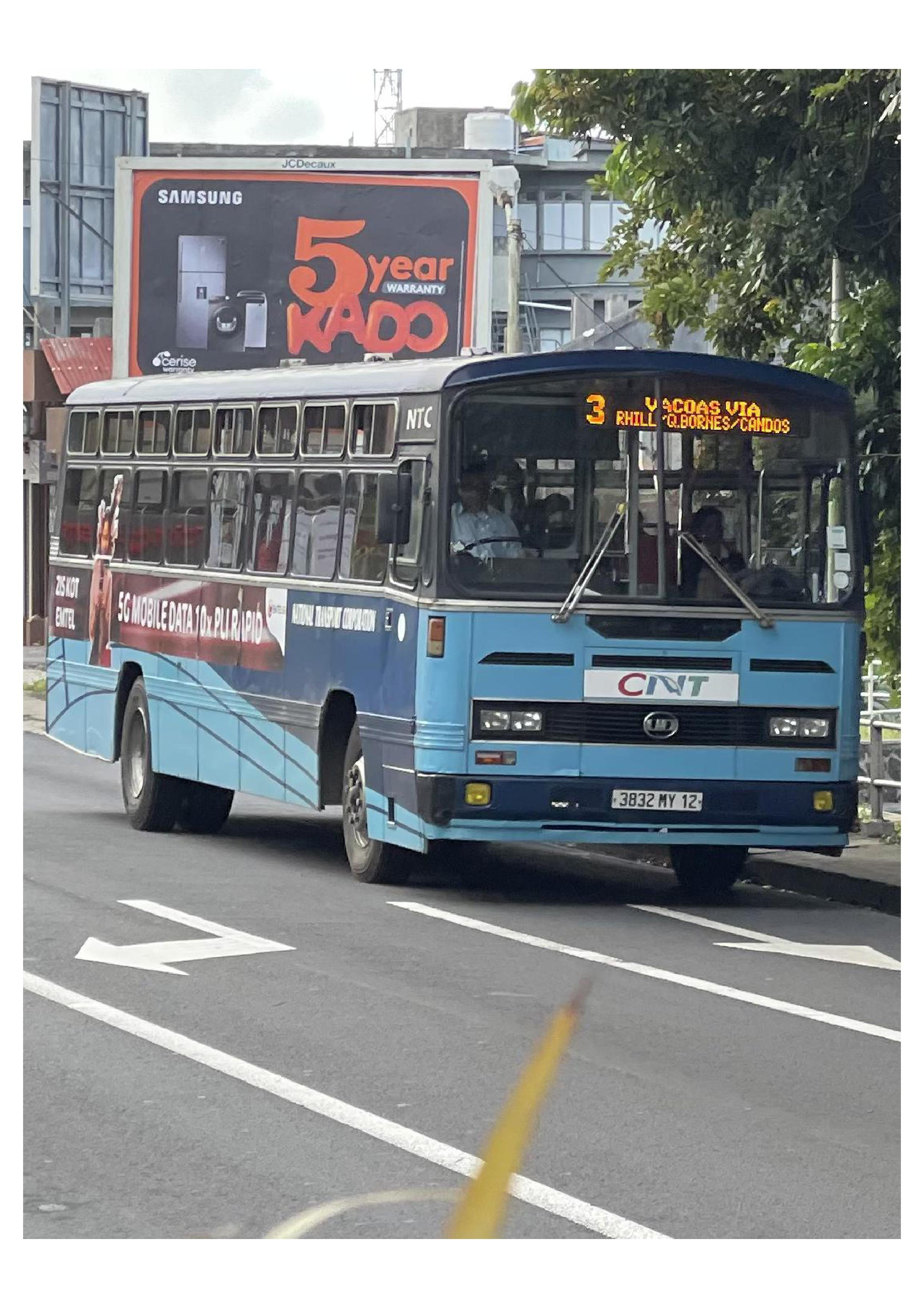
- CNT owned UD Trucks Bus, heading towards Vacoas-Phoenix on Route 3
- Formerly: 1954 as General Transport & Travel Company Ltd ---- 1955 as Vacoas Transport Co Ltd ---- 1980 as National Transport Corporation ---- 2019 as Corporation de Nationale Transport(CNT)
- Company type: Government owned, Parastatal
- Founded: Vacoas-Phoenix, Operations started from (1980)
- Headquarters: B70 Candos-Vacoas Road, Bonne Terre, Vacoas-Phoenix, Mauritius
- Areas served: Port Louis Immigration; Port Louis Victoria; Riviere du Rempart; Flic en Flac; Rose Hill; Quatre Bornes; Vacoas; Curepipe; St Pierre; Souillac; Riviere des Galets
- Key people: General Manager - Rao Ramah; Traffic Manager - Dr Rama Krishna Naidoo
- Number of employees: 2,300 (2022)
- Parent: Vacoas Transport
- Website: www.buscnt.mu

National Transport Corporation or CNT is a parastatal bus operator in Mauritius. The company operates 430 buses. There are 65 bus routes, some of which carry 21,000 passengers daily. The bus fleet consists of Ashok Leyland, Tata, UD Trucks, Yutong and BYD Buses.

== Depots ==
CNT has currently 6 depots in Mauritius

Sr.	Depot name
1	Riviere du Rempart(RRD)
2	La Tour Koenig(LTKD)
3	Remy Ollier(ROD)
4	Bonne Terre(BTD)
5	Forest Side(FSD)
6	Souillac(SOD)

== Bus Routes ==
The following is a list of the bus routes operated by CNT or NTC in Mauritius

Route number	Origin	Destination	Via:
3	Port Louis/Victoria	Vacoas	La Butte, Plaine Lauzun, GRNW, Coromandel, Beau Bassin, Rose Hill, Belle Rose, Quatre Bornes, Candos, Bonne Terre
3A	Port Louis/Victoria	Jumbo/Phoenix	La Butte, Plaine Lauzun, GRNW, Coromandel, Beau Bassin, Rose Hill, Belle Rose, Quatre Bornes, Candos, Bonne Terre, Vacoas, Palmerstone
3B	Port Louis/Victoria	Bord Cascades	La Butte, Plaine Lauzun, GRNW, Coromandel, Beau Bassin, Rose Hill, Belle Rose, Quatre Bornes, Candos, Bonne Terre, Quinze Cantons, Glen Park
3C	Port Louis/Victoria	Bassin	La Butte, Plaine Lauzun, GRNW, Coromandel, Beau Bassin, Rose Hill, Belle Rose, Quatre Bornes
3D	Port Louis/Victoria	La Marie	La Butte, Plaine Lauzun, GRNW, Coromandel, Beau Bassin, Rose Hill, Belle Rose, Quatre Bornes, Candos, Bonne Terre, Quinze Cantons, Glen Park, Morc Pousson
3E	Vacoas	Rose Hill	Bonne Terre, Candos, La Louise, Quatre Bornes, Belle Rose
4	Curepipe/North	Quatre Bornes	Eau Coulee, Castel, Mesnil, St Paul, Clarisse, Vacoas, Bonne Terre, Candos, La Louise
4A	Curepipe/North	Quatre Bornes	Floreal, Mangalkhan, Vacoas, Bonne Terre, Candos, La Louise
6	Curepipe/South	Riviere des Galets	Forest Side, Seizieme Mille, Nouvelle France, Beau Climat, La Flora, Britannia, Tyack, Riviere des Anguilles, Union Ducray, St Aubin, Souillac, Surinam, Chemin Grenier
6A	Curepipe/South	Chamouny	Forest Side, Seizieme Mille, Nouvelle France, Beau Climat, La Flora, Britannia, Tyack, Riviere des Anguilles, Union Ducray, St Aubin, Souillac, Surinam, Chemin Grenier
7	Rose Belle	Riviere des Galets	Balisson, Wireless Road, La Flora, Britannia, Tyack, Riviere des Anguilles, Union Ducray, St Aubin, Souillac, Surinam, Chemin Grenier
8	Souillac	Choisy/Baie du Cap	Surinam, Chemin Grenier, Riviere des Galets, Bel Ombre, St Martin
14	Curepipe/South	Rose Belle	Forest Side, Seizieme Mille, Midlands, Bananes, Cluny, Union Park, Balisson
23	Port Louis/Immigration	Riviere du Rempart	Nicolay, Abercrombie, Ste Croix, Le Hochet, Terre Rouge, Khoyratty, Calebasses, Pamplemousses, The Mount, Piton, Esperance Trebuchet, Poudre d'Or, Pte des Lascars
24	Port Louis/Immigration	Riviere du Rempart	Nicolay, Abercrombie, Ste Croix, Le Hochet, Terre Rouge, Khoyratty, Calebasses, Pamplemousses, Mon Gout, Grande Rosalie, Petite Julie, Barlow, Amaury, Belle Vue Maurel
27	Port Louis/Immigration	Riviere du Rempart	Nicolay, Abercrombie, Ste Croix, Le Hochet, Terre Rouge, Khoyratty, Calebasses, Pamplemousses, Belle Vue Harel, Mapou, Piton, Gokoolah-Amitie, Belle Vue Maurel
34	Curepipe/South	Bois Cheri	Forest Side, Seizieme Mille, Nouvelle France, Beau Climat, La Flora, Grand Bois
35	Vacoas	Hollyrood	La Caverne
37	Curepipe/North	Buckingham/Camp Levieux	Eau Coulee, Castel, Mesnil, St Paul, Clarisse, Vacoas, Bonne Terre, Candos, La Louise, Quatre Bornes, St Patrick, Stanley, Plaisance
37A	Curepipe/North	Buckingham/Camp Levieux	Floreal, Mangalkhan, Vacoas, Bonne Terre, Candos, La Louise, Quatre Bornes, St Patrick, Stanley, Plaisance
52	Port Louis/Immigration	Medine	Victoria, La Butte, Plaine Lauzun, GRNW, Richelieu, Petite Riviere, Canot, Bambous
52A	Port Louis/Immigration	Albion	Victoria, La Butte, Plaine Lauzun, GRNW, Richelieu, Petite Riviere, Belle Vue
52B	Port Louis/Immigration	Geoffroy NHDC	Victoria, La Butte, Plaine Lauzun, GRNW, Richelieu, Petite Riviere, Canot, Bambous
56	Flacq	GRSE	Boulet Rouge, Bramsthan, Ecroignard, Bel Air, Beau Champ
61	Curepipe/South	Camp Diable	Forest Side, Seizieme Mille, Nouvelle France, Beau Climat, La Flora, Riviere Dragon, Riche Bois
61A	Curepipe/South	Camp Diable	Forest Side, Seizieme Mille, Nouvelle France, Beau Climat, La Flora, Britannia, Tyack, Riviere des Anguilles, Batimarais, Benares
63	SSRN Hospital	Roches Noires	Pamplemousses, Mon Gout, Grande Rosalie, Petite Julie, Barlow, Amaury, Belle Vue Maurel, Riviere du Rempart
63A	Port Louis/Immigration	Roches Noires	Nicolay, Abercrombie, Ste Croix, Le Hochet, Terre Rouge, Arsenal, SSRN Hospital, Pamplemousses, Mon Gout, Grande Rosalie, Petite Julie, Barlow, Amaury, Belle Vue Maurel, Riviere du Rempart
66B	Vacoas	Curepipe/South	Cantin, Reunion, Glen Park, Morc Pousson, La Marie, Labrasserie, Forest Side
66C	Vacoas	Grand Bassin	Cantin, Reunion, Glen Park, Morc Pousson, La Marie, Mare aux Vacoas, Plaine Sophie
67	Rose Hill	Riviere des Galets	Ebene, Shoprite, Phoenix, Highlands, Wooton, La Vigie, Nouvelle France, Beau Climat, La Flora, Britannia, Tyack, Riviere des Anguilles, Union Ducray, St Aubin, Souillac, Surinam, Chemin Grenier
68	Curepipe/North	Edward VII/Rose Hill	Eau Coulee, Castel, Mesnil, St Paul, Clarisse, Vacoas, Bonne Terre, Candos, La Louise, Ollier, Berthaud, Boundary, Plaisance
68A	Curepipe/North	Edward VII/Rose Hill	Floreal, Mangalkhan, Vacoas, Bonne Terre, Candos, La Louise, Ollier, Berthaud, Boundary, Plaisance
69	Port Louis/Victoria	Beaux Songes	La Butte, Plaine Lauzun, GRNW, Coromandel, Beau Bassin, Rose Hill, Belle Rose, Quatre Bornes, Palma
79	Rose Belle	Bois Cheri	JN Hospital, Balisson, Wireless Road, Beau Climat, La Flora, Grand Bois
84	Plaine des Roches	SSRN Hospital	Riviere du Rempart, Gokoolah-Amitie, Piton, Mapou, Belle Vue Harel, Pamplemousses, Beau Plan
84A	Port Louis/Immigration	Riviere du Rempart	Nicolay, Abercrombie, Ste Croix, Le Hochet, Terre Rouge, Arsenal, SSRN Hospital, Beau Plan, Pamplemousses, Belle Vue Harel, Mapou, Piton, Gokoolah-Amitie
85	Port Louis/Immigration	Riviere du Rempart	Nicolay, Abercrombie, Ste Croix, Le Hochet, Terre Rouge, Arsenal, SSRN Hospital, Beau Plan, Pamplemousses, Belle Vue Harel, Mapou, Piton, Esperance Trebuchet, Schoenfeld
86	Port Louis/Immigration	Riviere du Rempart	Nicolay, Abercrombie, Ste Croix, Le Hochet, Terre Rouge, Khoyratty, Calebasses, Pamplemousses, The Mount, Piton, Esperance Trebuchet, Poudre d'Or, Pointe des Lascars
102	Port Louis/Victoria	Curepipe/North	La Butte, Plaine Lauzun, GRNW, Coromandel, Beau Bassin, Rose Hill, Belle Rose, Shoprite, Phoenix, St Paul, Clarisse, Mangalkhan, Floreal
119	Port Louis/Immigration	Riviere Noire	Victoria, La Butte, Plaine Lauzun, GRNW, Richelieu, Petite Riviere, Canot, Bambous, Cascavelle Mall, Tamarin, La Preneuse
122	Curepipe/North	Camp Levieux	Floreal, Mangalkhan, Vacoas, Bonne Terre, Candos, La Louise, Quatre Bornes, Boundary, Plaisance, Roches Brunes
122A	Curepipe/North	Camp Levieux	Eau Coulee, Castel, Mesnil, St Paul, Clarisse, Vacoas, Bonne Terre, Candis, La Louise, Quatre Bornes, Boundary, Plaisance, Roches Brunes
123	Port Louis/Immigration	Flic en Flac/Wolmar	Victoria, La Butte, Plaine Lauzun, GRNW, Richelieu, Petite Riviere, Canot, Bambous, Cascavelle Mall, Domaine Anna
125	Curepipe/North	Cite la Caverne	Floreal, Mangalkhan, Vacoas, La Caverne
127	Port Louis/Immigration	Riviere du Rempart(Via New Trunk Road from Immigration to Calebasses)	New Trunk Road, Quay D, Roche Bois, Cocoterie, Riche Terre, Terre Rouge, Calebasses, Pamplemousses, Mon Gout, The Mount, Piton, Gokoolah-Amitie
133	Curepipe/South	Choisy/Baie du Cap	Forest Side, Seizieme Mille, Nouvelle France, Beau Climat, La Flora, Britannia, Tyack, Riviere des Anguilles, Union Ducray, St Aubin, Souillac, Surinam, Chemin Grenier, Riviere des Galets, Bel Ombre, St Martin
134	Curepipe/North	Bord Cascades	Floreal, Mangalkhan, Sadally, Cantin, Glen Park
137	Curepipe/South	Carreau Acacia	Forest Side, Seizieme Mille, Nouvelle France, Union Park, Balisson, Rose Belle, New Grove, Mare d'Albert, Plaine Magnien, Mon Desert
141	Port Louis/Victoria	Bord Cascades	New Trunk Road, Cassis, Pailles, Bagatelle, Reduit, Shoprite, Jumbo, Palmerstone, Vacoas, Cantin, Glen Park
153	Curepipe/North	St Pierre	Floreal, Mangalkhan, Vacoas, Bonne Terre, Candos, La Louise, Quatre Bornes, Ebene, Reduit, MGI, Gentilly
156	Port Louis/Victoria	Ollier	La Butte, Plaine Lauzun, GRNW, Coromandel, Beau Bassin, Rose Hill, Belle Rose, Berthaud
156A	Rose Hill	La Source NHDC	Belle Rose, St Jean, Quatre Bornes, La Louise
163	Port Louis/Victoria	Vacoas(Blueline Express)	New Trunk Road, Cassis, Pailles, Bagatelle, Reduit, St Jean, Quatre Bornes, La Louise, Candos, Bonne Terre
167	Bord Cascades/Henrietta	St Pierre	Glen Park, Reunion, Cantin, Vacoas, Palmerstone, Jumbo, Shoprite, Ebene Cybercity, Reduit, MGI, Moka, Gentilly
168	Curepipe/South	Grand Bassin	Forest Side, Seizieme Mille, Nouvelle France, Beau Climat, La Flora, Grand Bois, Bois Cheri
170	Port Louis/Victoria	Curepipe/North	La Butte, Plaine Lauzun, GRNW, Coromandel, Beau Bassin, Rose Hill, Belle Rose, Quatre Bornes, La Louise, Candos, Bonne Terre, Vacoas, Clarisse, St Paul, Mesnil, Castel, Eau Coulee
170A	Port Louis/Victoria	Curepipe/North	La Butte, Plaine Lauzun, GRNW, Coromandel, Beau Bassin, Rose Hill, Belle Rose, Quatre Bornes, La Louise, Candos, Bonne Terre, Vacoas, Mangalkhan, Floreal
178	Goodlands/Belmont Traffic Centre	Madame Azor	Super U, Goodlands Village, Belin, Mapou Leclezio, Goodlands Village, Jugdambi SSS, St Antoine, Madame Azor Road, Petit Village Junction
179	Curepipe/North	Flic en Flac	Eau Coulee, Castel, Mesnil, St Paul, Clarisse, Vacoas, Bonne Terre, Candos, La Louise, Palma, Beau Songes, Geoffroy, Bambous, Cascavelle Mall, Domaine Anna, Wolmar
179A	Curepipe/North	Flic en Flac	Floreal, Mangalkhan, Vacoas, Bonne Terre, Candos, La Louise, Palma, Beau Songes, Geoffroy, Bambous, Cascavelle Mall, Domaine Anna, Wolmar
188	Port Louis/Victoria	Sodnac	New Trunk Road, Camp Chapelon, Pailles, Soreze, Bagatelle, Reduit, Pellegrin, Shoprite, Cite St Jean
190	Immigration Square	Victoria	New Trunk Road
195	Quatre Bornes	Jumbo Phoenix	Avenue des Glaieuls, Sodnac
197	Port Louis/Victoria	Riviere des Galets	New Trunk Road, Camp Chapelon, Pailles, Soreze, Bagatelle, Reduit, Pellegrin, Shoprite, Pont Fer, Phoenix, Highlands, Camp Fouquereaux, Wooton, La Vigie, Midlands, Nouvelle France, Beau Climat, La Flora, Britannia, Tyack, Riviere des Anguilles, Union Ducray, St Aubin, Souillac, Surinam, Chemin Grenier
203	Port Louis/Immigration	Camp Levieux	Venus, Plaine Lauzun, GRNW, Montee S, Richelieu, Petite Riviere, Gros Cailloux, Canot, St Martin, Roches Brunes
219	Curepipe/North	Quatre Bornes	Sivananda Avenue, Curepipe Road, Floreal, Sadally, Vacoas, Palmerstone, Jumbo Phoenix, Medpoint, Candos, La Louise
