= Central Electricity Board (Mauritius) =

Central Electricity Board (CEB)
Agency overview
- Formed: December 8, 1952
- Jurisdiction: Government of Mauritius
- Headquarters: Ebène Cybercity, Mauritius
- Agency executive: Radhakrishna Chellapermal, Chairman
- Website: ceb.mu

The Central Electricity Board (CEB) is the power generation, power transmission, distribution and sale of electricity agency for Mauritius.

== History and establishment ==
The Board was formally constituted and held its first meeting on 8 December 1952. Prior to the formation of CEB, electricity was generated by a number of private companies which owned and operated the Réduit Station (Mauritius Hydro Electric Company of Atchia brothers), the Cascade Cécile (Darné family), and the Tamarind Falls Power Station (GES Company). The Brazzell Report of 1949 recommended the formation of CEB following a study commissioned by the Colonial Government.
