= Harry Krishnan Tirvengadum =

Sir Harry Tirvengadum Kt

Managing Director Air Mauritius
- In office 1978–1997

Chairman Air Afrique
- In office 1997–1999

Personal details
- Born: Harry Krishnan Tirvengadum; 2 September 1933 (age 93) Stanley, Rose Hill, British Mauritius
- Spouse: Elahe Amin Amin (m. 1970)
- Children: 3

Sir Harry Krishnan Tirvengadum, more commonly known as Harry Tirvengadum or HK Tirvengadum (born 2 September 1933) is a Mauritian who was the Chairman and Managing Director of Air Mauritius.

== Early life and education ==
Harry Krishnan Tirvengadum was born in Stanley, Beau Bassin-Rose Hill in 1933, one of seven children born to Govinden Tirvengadum, a court interpreter and Meenatchee Sangeelee, a housewife. He completed his secondary education at Royal College Curepipe before travelling to the United Kingdom to study business administration at Oxford University.

== Family ==
On 30 October 1970, Tirvengadum married Elahe Amin-Amin, an Iranian national who was living in Japan. Their three daughters are Shirin Kinoshita, Selina Sheila and Melissa Tirvengadum.

== Business career ==
After returning to Mauritius Harry Krishnan Tirvengadum worked at the Ministry of Information and Rogers Group before being employed at Air Mauritius in 1972. He became Managing Director (MD) of Air Mauritius in 1978, a position which had been held by Sir Amédée Maingard since 1967.

Tirvengadum remained MD of the national airline corporation until February 1997 when he was succeeded by Nash Mallam Hassam.

After leaving Air Mauritius, Tirvengadum became Chairman of airline company Air Afrique which is based in Ivory Coast. He led that organisation until 30 January 1999 where he was succeeded by Tijane Sylla.

== Recognition ==
In December 1987, Tirvengadum was knighted as part of the Queen's Birthday Honours.

He travelled to Libya at the end of 2003 to receive a Distinguished Service Award of the African Airlines Association (AAA). For many years he was an active participant in conferences organised by the International Air Transport Association (IATA).

== Controversies ==
In 2001, the illegal practices involved in the Caisse Noire Affair came to light and, on 22 February 2002, Tirvengadum and other officials of the national airline company and Rogers Limited were arrested and prosecuted. Whistleblower Gérard Tyack, who was General Manager of Air Mauritius, revealed the existence of a Swiss bank account in Geneva for the payment to officials of Air Mauritius, journalists and politicians, as well as to finance political newspapers, electoral campaigns, purchase of private cars for Sir Harry's wife and their daughters' overseas studies. The illicit bank account had been set up following Sir Seewoosagur Ramgoolam's request for funds in 1981 to assist Advance which was the ailing propaganda newspaper of the Labour Party.

Gérard Tyack spent 2 years in jail, Robert Rivalland of Rogers Limited was acquitted in 2015, whereas the prosecution against Tirvengadum was placed on hold due to his purported ill health.
