= Mauritian Australians =

Total population
- 60,000 estimate as of 2017 (by birth and ancestry)

Regions with significant populations
- Mauritius-born/ancestry people by state or territory
- Victoria: 32,000
- New South Wales: 12,260
- Western Australia: 11,200

Languages
- Australian English · French · Mauritian Creole · Mauritian Bhojpuri · Hindi · Urdu · Tamil · Telugu · Marathi

Religion
- Christianity mainly Catholicism · Hinduism mainly Sanatan Dharm · Sunni Islam

Related ethnic groups
- African Australians · French Australians · Indian Australians · Chinese Australians · Fijian Australians

Mauritian Australians are Australians of Mauritian origin, including Mauritius-born Australians and Australians of Mauritian ancestry.

In 2021, the Australian census recorded 25,981 Mauritius-born people in Australia, an increase of 6.8 per cent from the 2016 census.

As of 2021, the state with the largest population of Mauritius-born Australians was Victoria with a population of 12,341, followed by New South Wales (5,794) and Western Australia (5,208)

== History ==
Based on the trading relationship between Mauritius and Australia which was established in 1803, the first Mauritian migrants arrived in Australia before the 1901 federation as convicts, fossickers during the gold rush, or sugar men who were skilled sugarcane workers who helped to develop Queensland's sugar industry.

Right after World War II the migration of Mauritians to Australia resumed, but was restricted to the privileged minority of white Franco-Mauritians due to the White Australia policy which prevailed until 1973. Especially in the years leading to the 1968 Independence of Mauritius there was a significant increase in the number of Franco-Mauritians, Mulatto, and Mauritian Creoles who migrated permanently to Australia as a result of the anti-Hindu hegemony fear campaign which was financed by the white Franco-Mauritian owners of sugar estates and implemented by Gaetan Duval's Parti Mauricien Social Démocrate and the local press. Indeed a climate of fear and uncertainty resulted from the fear campaign which resulted in lynching, murders and racial riots which broke out in 1965, 1967, and 1968.

== Cultural background ==
As Mauritius is a country with a multicultural and multiethnic society, Mauritians have different and diverse ethnic backgrounds. In the 2021 Census, most Mauritius-born people living in Australia reported being of Mauritian descent (13,673), followed by those of French (5,674), Indian (3,873), and Chinese descent (2,751).

Based on ethnic lines, Creole Mauritians (Black and mixed-race) represent 50% of the community in Australia, this group were largest numbers leaving Mauritius after independence from colonial rule (Britain, and previously, France) in 1968. Chinese-Mauritians make up 7%, arriving mostly during the 80s and 90s, those of Indian ancestry are 20-25% and Creoles of African ancestry 20-25%. Most of the Afro-Mauritians and Indians have arrived after the 2000s, and are the fastest growing part of the community. Mauritian-Australians have a growing presence in Australian popular culture, including in music, literature, and television. Aisha in The Slap is a notable example, identified in the TV series adaptation as 'Mauritian-Australian'. Havana Brown is a significant Australian musician of Mauritian background.

== Language ==
The main languages spoken by Mauritius-born people in Australia were French (12,545), English (5,665) and Mauritian (2,654). Note that Australia has a large French-speaking Mauritian community in relation to percentage of the overall Mauritian community, they represent 1.4% of the Mauritian community, although numbers would be much higher, but most of the second generation speak English. The French speakers using the language as mother tongue represent the white Franco-Mauritians, Mulattos and gens de couleur (mixed-race Creoles) ethnic groups, making up at least 50% of the Mauritian community in Australia. In comparison, in Mauritius 4.1% of the population speaks French as a first language (mother tongue) with 68.6% using French as a second language making a total of 72.7% French speakers.

== Notable people ==
- Dylan Collard- footballer, Portugal Liga 2, Mauritius International
- Marlee Francois- footballer, ex A-League player
- Tyrese Francois- footballer, Current A-League Player
- Jake Adelson- footballer, ex A-League player
- Nick Sullivan- footballer, ex A-League player
- Nikolai Topor-Stanley- footballer, ex A-League player, former Socceroo
- Jordi Valadon- footballer, Current A-League player
- Miguel Di Pizio- footballer, Current A-League player
- Ludovic Boi- footballer, ex A-League player
- Orwin Castel- footballer, Former Mauritius International
- Jean-Paul De Marigny- footballer, NSL, Football Manager, former Socceroo
- Stephan de Robillard- footballer, Mauritius International
- Marcus Dimanche- footballer, Mauritius International
- Patrick Kisnorbo- footballer, EFL player, Scottish Premier league, NSL, ex A-League player, Football Manager, former Socceroo
- Cooper Legrand- footballer, Mauritius International
- Doug Ithier- footballer, ex NSL player
- Stacey Alleaume- Australian soprano singer
- Ivan Astruc- Australian rules footballer
- Angry Anderson- rock singer-songwriter, television presenter-reporter and actor
- Ralph Babet- Senator
- Shalom Brune-Franklin- actress
- Havana Brown- DJ, singer, recording artist, record producer and dancer.
- Denis Constantin- badminton player
- Edward Duyker- historian, biographer and author
- Drozena Eden- Australian rules footballer
- Laurina Fleure- Model and TV Personality
- Andrew Florent- tennis player
- Oliver Florent- Australian rules footballer - Sydney, Carlton
- Genevieve Gregson- Athlete
- Mahesh Jadu- actor
- Bob Joshua- politician
- Bert La Bonté- actor
- Fabrice Lapierre- long jumper
- Jerome Laxale- politician
- John La Nauze- Australian historian
- Odile Le Clezio- Actress
- Frederick Manton- politician
- Charles Frederick Maynard- Aboriginal Australian activist
- Disco Montego- R&B & Dance group
- Thomas Shadrach Peersahib- herbalist, teacher, activist
- Lloyd Rees- painter
- Aaron Rouge-Serret- Athlete
- Anabelle Smith- Diving
- Arthur Stace- soldier
- Starley- singer and songwriter
- Anne-Marie Schwirtlich- Director-General of the National Library of Australia
- Cooper Trembath- Australian rules footballer - North Melbourne
- Julian Barbara Waugh- Mayor and Politician
- Bernard Zuel- journalist

== See also ==
- Mauritians
