= 1968 Mauritian riots =

Christian–Muslim violent clashes in Port Louis

1968 Mauritian religious and race riots
- Date: 22 January 1968
- Location: Plaine Verte & Cité Martial, Port Louis; 20°09′37″S 57°30′54″E
- Caused by: ethnic tension declaration of independence
- Methods: Race riots, looting, protests, street fights.
- Result: Unconfirmed number of dead Hundreds injured Thousands driven from their homes.

The 1968 Mauritian riots or Bagarre raciale Plaine Verte refers to a number of violent clashes that occurred in the Port Louis neighbourhoods of Cité Martial, Bell Village, Roche Bois, Sainte-Croix, Cité Martial and Plaine Verte as well as in the village of Madame Azor near Goodlands in Mauritius over a period of ten days, six weeks before the country's declaration of independence on 12 March 1968.

The riot manifested as an open communal conflict between Creoles and Indo-Mauritian Muslims, and had its roots in gang rivalry, communal tensions caused by politicians, and uncertainties about the country's future given the imminence of independence from Britain.

== Uncertainty caused by Independence ==
Political tension was high at the time due to uncertainty about the economic and political future of Mauritius after the departure of the British. About half of the population was against independence due to concerns that they might lose out in the new government.

== Involvement of gangs and politicians ==
The authorities viewed the riot as being partially the result of rivalries between the ‘Istanbul’ Muslim gang and their Creole rival gangs ‘Texas’ and Mafia in Port Louis which had been exacerbated by political uncertainty due to the imminent advent of independence. Each gang had connections with affluent politicians of the time, namely those of the PMSD and CAM. At the August 1967 elections eminent members of the Labour-CAM-IFB, such as Abdool Razack Mohamed and Michael Leal had lost their seats to their rivals of the PMSD. The gang clashes led to the deaths of a Muslim and a Christian which sparked a spiral of violence in the communities.

== Escalation of violence ==
The 1968 riots were the worst period of social turmoil in Mauritius since the Uba riots of 1937, 1943 Belle Vue Harel Massacre, 1965 Mauritius race riots and 1967 Port Louis riots. At least 29 people died, 597 houses were looted, 246 homes were set on fire, and 700 families were displaced before British troops and unprepared Mauritian police quelled the fighting. Prior to the riots the neighbourhoods of Cité Martial and Plaine Verte had been ethnically mixed areas for over a hundred years. The riots resulted in the two communities becoming ethnically heterogeneous communities. The true death toll of these riots is believed to be much higher than the official report of 29 deaths as newspapers refrained from providing names and details of the victims to prevent an aggravation of racial tensions. Known victims include Abu Soobratty (Abu Bakar Noorani), Rajack Joghee, Abbas Peerbhoy, Hermann Bangard, Karl Berger, Daniel Sylvio, Renaud Legallant, Cyril Cangy, and Maris Sylvio.

== Restoration of peace ==
Order was restored by a company of the King's Shropshire Light Infantry called in from Singapore after a state of emergency was declared by Governor Sir John Shaw Rennie on 22 January 1968 and lasted for ten days. In their effort to restore order the British deployed three Bell H-13 Sioux helicopters and around 150 troops. Violence was contained to the urban areas of Port Louis and did not spread to the rest of the island.

== See also ==
- 1850 Yamsé Ghoon Riots
- 1906 Pagoda riots
- Uba riots of 1937
- 1943 Belle Vue Harel Massacre
- 1965 Mauritius race riots
- 1967 Port Louis riots
- 1999 Mauritian riots
