= Abdool Razack Mohamed =

Indian-born politician

The Honourable Abdul Razack Mohamed અબ્દુલ રઝાક મોહમ્મદ
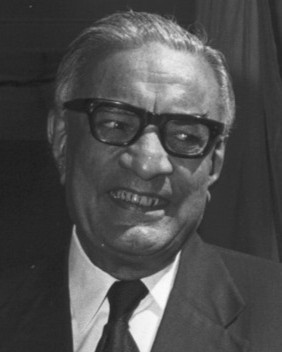

2nd Deputy Prime Minister of Mauritius
- In office 12 March 1968 – 20 December 1976
- Monarch: Elizabeth II
- Governor General: Sir John Shaw Rennie
- Prime Minister: Seewoosagur Ramgoolam
- Succeeded by: Sir Gaetan Duval

Minister of Housing & Lands
- In office 3 March 1967 – 8 April 1976
- Governor General: Henry Garrioch
- Prime Minister: Seewoosagur Ramgoolam
- Preceded by: Office Established
- Succeeded by: Harish Boodhoo

Member of Parliament
- In office 7 October 1966 – 8 April 1976
- Prime Minister: Seewoosagur Ramgoolam

Member of Parliament
- In office 1959–1963
- Prime Minister: Seewoosagur Ramgoolam

Member of Parliament
- In office 1953–1959
- Prime Minister: Seewoosagur Ramgoolam

Lord Mayor Port Louis
- In office 1949–1949

Lord Mayor Port Louis
- In office 1953–1953

Lord Mayor Port Louis
- In office 1956–1956

Personal details
- Born: 1 August 1906 Calcutta, British India
- Died: 8 May 1978 (aged 71)
- Party: Ralliement Mauricien; CAM
- Occupation: Businessman, politician

Sir Abdool Razack Mohamed (Gujarati: અબ્દુલ રઝાક મોહમ્મદ; 1 August 1906 – 8 May 1978) was an Indian-born former senior minister in the pre and post-independence cabinet of Mauritius.

== Early life and family ==
Abdool Razack Mohamed was born in a wealthy mercantile Memon family in Calcutta, British India in 1906. His father Khan Bahadur Hadji Zackariah Mohamed was involved in the import and export trade of sugar. Abdool Razack migrated to Mauritius where he arrived on 16 November 1928 at the age of 22. He returned to Calcutta where he married Mariam before returning to Mauritius. Mariam gave birth to 4 children (Amina, Zackariah who died at the age of 3, Zohra and Salma). In 1932, Abdool Razack married a Creole woman named Ghislaine Ducasse whom he had met at dance lessons. Ghislaine changed her name to Zainab and gave birth to 6 children (Yousuf, Fatma, Abdul Rahim, Aisha, Abdul Rashid and Ismaël). Before his entry into politics he became a well known businessman and trader in Quatre Bornes.

One of his daughters was Aamna who married in Calcutta, Abdool Razack's son Yousuf Mohamed is a lawyer who was elected for one term (1976 to 1979) to the National Assembly where he served as minister. Yousuf was also Ambassador in Egypt. Abdool Razack's grandson Shakeel Mohamed is also a lawyer who has been MP who served as minister from 2010 to 2014. Abdool Razack Mohamed died in Rose Hill on 8 May 1978.

== Political career ==
During a business trip to Colombia Abdool Razack met Maulana Abdul Aleem Siddiqui whom he invited to Mauritius in 1938. By 1939 Maulana Siddiqui had migrated to Mauritius and he advised Abdool Razack to get involved in local politics. His initial entry in politics in 1940 was not successful. But in 1946 Abdool Razack Mohamed was elected as a municipal councillor of Port Louis as an independent. He was then elected as Lord Mayor of Port Louis in 1949, 1953 and 1956.

In the early 1940s he championed the cause of all Indo-Mauritians both Muslims and Hindus as most of them were not allowed to vote until 1948. At the 1945 consultative committee for the revision of the Constitution set up by governor Donald Mackenzie-Kennedy he proposed a new electoral system which would allocate at least 50% of the seats in the Council of Government to the Indo-Mauritians. The Constitution of 1882 was still in force and made it almost impossible for any Indo-Mauritian to be elected by votes. Although he was a candidate at the 1948 elections he was not elected in the electoral district of Port Louis.

However, by the 1950s Abdool Razack switched his allegiance away from the Labour Party and joined the bandwagon of the new Ralliement Mauricien which was formed in 1953 by Jules Koenig. In one of his public meetings he explained that minorities such as Muslims would be better protected from the growing threat of Hindu hegemony especially with the impending constitutional changes. Given that Ralliement Mauricien was claiming to be a national roadblock to prevent minorities from being swamped away, Mohamed devoted himself entirely to Jules Koenig's cause. Using the Ralliement Mauricien's platform Abdool Razack attacked the Labour Party and especially its emerging leader Dr. Seewoosagur Ramgoolam. Mohamed openly accused Ramgoolam of supporting Hindu nationalists. At a 1955 public meeting he warned that Muslims would not be used as a stepping stone to further other politicians' objectives especially on the growing issue of independence from colonial England. The local press reported that Mohamed believed that "Muslims do not want an independence whereby we will all be dominated by Ramgoolam". He was nominated for the first time to the Legislative Council in 1953 as a member of the party "Ralliement Mauricien" of Jules Koenig in the electoral district of Port Louis as fourth member, and where 3 Labour Party candidates (Guy Rozemont, Renganaden Seeneevassen and Edgar Millien) had been elected with the highest number of votes.

However Abdool Razack quickly came to realise that he was not welcome even within Koenig's Union Mauricienne, epitomised by an incident whereby the party endorsed his rival and colleague Alex Bhujoharry's protest for a recount of votes after Mohamed was elected ahead of Bhujoharry by one vote in Port-Louis. This was soon followed by the white lobby to oust him from the executive committee of Koenig's Union Mauricienne as well as the denial of a nomineeship in the Executive Council. The white Franco-Mauritian elite chose Osman instead of Mohamed. Finally Koenig's party rejected Abdool Razack's request for a separate electoral roll and reserved seats for Muslims. In 1953 the Union Mauricienne rebranded itself as Ralliement Mauricien and a few months later it was changed to Parti Mauricien which Gaetan Duval later changed to PMSD. Although Mohamed had already decided to quit politics a series of letters written by groups of Muslims appeared in the press to urge him to return to his past ally the Labour party. But Mohamed refused to do so directly given that he believed that Labour Party members were dishonest and because he refused to work with his arch-rival Edgar Millien whom he had described as an opportunist. Thus in 1959 Abdool Razack Mohamed founded his own party called Comité d'Action Musulman (CAM). Soon afterwards the CAM contracted an alliance with the Labour Party. Seewoosagur Ramgoolam even attended the first meeting of the new CAM which was held in February 1959 at Plaine Verte. Within the Labour Party the alliance was well accepted as Edgar Millien had started to distance himself from the Labour Party. Besides Renganaden Seeneevassen and Guy Rozemont had already died. Earlier in 1956 Seeneevassen had successfully lobbied the government to instigate the Keith-Lucas commission to investigate allegations of fraud during the Mohamed's tenure as Lord Mayor in 1953. Indeed, there had been serious allegations of fraud during the 1953 municipal elections in Port-Louis which resulted in Abdool Razack's election to office. Despite the CAM's alliance with the Labour Party Mohamed persisted with his demand for a separate electoral roll and reserved seats for the Muslims. His approach had been shaped by the All India Muslim League's strategy of the 1950s which successfully weakened the rising Indian nationalism. Mohamed's approach had the unexpected outcome of arousing communal passions within other communities as other politicians decided to adopt Abdool Razack's communal partitioning approach. The 1957 London Agreement split the Indo-Mauritians into 2 distinct communities: Indo-Mauritian Hindus and Indo-Mauritian Muslims. The Indo-Mauritian Muslim community was thus recognised as distinct section of the population. The Trustram Eve's Electoral Boundary Commission (EBC) introduced a new electoral system and a re-zoning of constituencies in 1959. The EBC facilitated the election of Muslims in some constituencies without having to rely on other communities anymore. Trustam Eve thus enabled Mohamed to position himself as the leader of the Muslim community. As a result, during the 1959 general elections 5 Muslims were elected and Abdool Razack received the credit for this achievement. He had earlier made history by becoming the first ever Muslim to be elected to Legislative Council at the 1953 elections. In 1959 he was appointed to his first ministerial position (Minister of Housing).

Following the 1960 visit by Secretary of State Ian Macleod to the island of Mauritius Abdool Razack became aware of the inevitability of independence. Thus changes in the Constitution and electoral system were bound to occur and would once again affect Muslims' representation. The 1965 Constitutional Conference Report outlined the positions of the parties present at Lancaster House and stated that the only 2 parties advocating immediate independence were the Labour Party and Sookdeo Bissoondoyal's Independent Forward Bloc (IFB). The Secretary of State Anthony Greenwood declared that Mauritius had reached the ultimate status for independence and that the 1963 general elections had already been an indicator of the overwhelming support of independence given that when combined the Labour Party and the IFB gathered 61.5% of the votes. The report did not give weight to the indecisiveness of the CAM on the issue of independence. The CAM gathered politician J. Ah Chuen's support to ensure that the Secretary of State developed a formula for safeguarding the interests of minority groups in the Legislative Assembly. This formula became known as the Best Loser System which has now survived for several decades.

The CAM became part of the coalition called Independence Party which held office after the August 1967 elections in preparation for independence from Great Britain in March 1968 despite the deadly January 1968 Mauritian riots and State of Emergency. The Independence Party consisted of the 3 main parties Parti Travailliste (PTr), Independent Forward Bloc (IFB) and the CAM. This coalition campaigned against the PMSD and a few other minor parties which were opposed to the concept of an independent Mauritius.

From 1967 to 1976 Sir Abdool Razack Mohamed served as Deputy Prime Minister and Minister of Social Security.

== Recognition ==
In 1978 a high school located at La Poudrière Street in Port Louis was named after him. One of the main streets of Port Louis has also been named after him. His effigy also appears on the two hundred rupees (Rs 200) banknote of Mauritius. The centenary of his birth was commemorated by the Mauritian Government.
