= Basdeo Bissoondoyal =

Mauritian social worker (1906 - 1991)

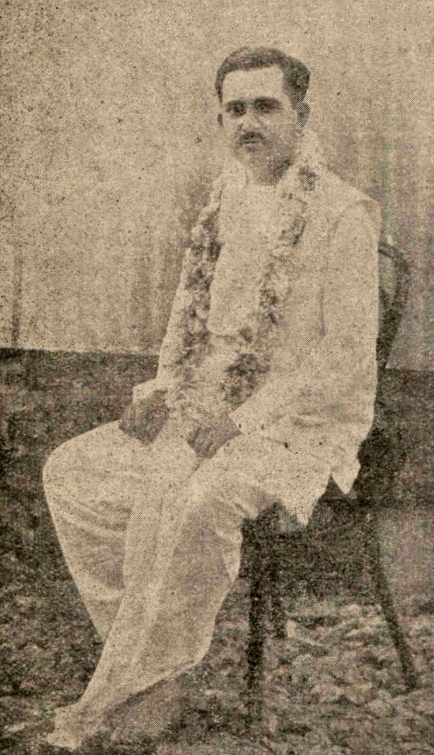

Leader of Jan Andolan
- In office November 1939 – August 1967

Personal details
- Born: 15 April 1906 British Mauritius
- Died: 23 June 1991 (aged 85) Souillac, Mauritius

Basdeo Bissoondoyal (15 April 1906 – 23 June 1991) was a Mauritian social worker, educator and writer who played an important role in the pre-Independence politics and independence movement on the island of Mauritius. He is also sometimes referred to as "Pandit Basdeo Bissoondoyal" or "Professor Basdeo Bissoondoyal".

== Early life ==
Basdeo Bissoondoyal was born in Tyack, Rivière des Anguilles in 1906. He had two brothers Sookdeo and Soogrim. He relocated to Rue Valonville, Tranquebar, Port Louis with his family.

== Education ==
In 1933 he travelled to Lahore and Calcutta in India where he studied philosophy, history, Sanskrit literature, Bhagavad Gita and the Vedas. Six years later Basdeo returned to Mauritius by 1939 after graduating with a Master of Arts degree from University of Calcutta in the same year that his elder brother Soogrim had died at the age of 35.

== Social work ==
Basdeo and his two brothers had been actively involved in the Arya Kumar Sabha branch since 1925, and by 1929 were in charge of the Arya Paropkarani Sabha branch of the Arya Samaj. From 1939 onwards Basdeo drew inspiration from Mahatma Gandhi's struggle for the Independence of India that he witnessed first hand during the six years that he had spent in the subcontinent. Thus he founded the Jan Andolan movement in Mauritius at a time when universal suffrage did not exist. His goal was to build upon the work of other movements such as the Arya Samaj which had been active since 1897 in the promotion of Hindi and progressive Hinduism. Basdeo toured the island to promote the need for education, self-expression and liberation of the mass. Basdeo trained several volunteers and encouraged young people to voice their concern against growing corruption. He spent a significant amount of time in the villages of Lallmatie, Bon Acceuil, Laventure and Brissée Verdière (Flacq) to spread his message.

Following the September 1943 Belle Vue Harel Massacre Basdeo organised the funeral ceremonies of the 4 labourers who had been shot dead by the police following a strike in protest against low wages and poor working conditions. The mass gathering of Jan Andolan at "Marie Reine de la Paix" in Port Louis on 12 December 1943, four years prior to the proclamation of the new 1947 Constitution was an indication of the mass support that he had gathered.

== Political impact ==
Colonial rulers jailed Basdeo Bissoondoyal on four occasions due to the impact of his movement's educational campaign on the working poor. Following Mahatma Gandhi's example he opted to spend time in jail rather than paying the fines. However Basdeo remained an influential character on the political scene and its only after consultation with Basdeo that Guy Rozemont put forward a motion in Legislative Council to make the First of May a Public Holiday. In 1943 Basdeo Bissoondoyal and his Jan Andolan volunteers successfully organised a Maha Yaj festival in Port-Louis despite colonial rulers' cancellation of all public transport. That event was attended by about 60,000 people in the capital city.

Aided by the local press whom they financed the Franco-Mauritian owners of sugar plantations and sugar mills canvassed the Governor (Sir Donald Mackenzie-Kennedy) to reduce the growing influence of Basdeo's movement as they feared social upheaval and a loss of their power and influence. Thus the British colonial government started to plan the deportation of Basdeo Bissoondoyal to Diego Garcia in a similar fashion to the 1938 deportation of trade unionist Emmanuel Anquetil to Rodrigues by Sir Bede Clifford. However after consulting Secretary of State (Arthur Creech Jones) and Emmanuel Anquetil the Governor was convinced that Basdeo had no evil intentions. Thus all plans to deport Basdeo Bissoondoyal to Diego Garcia were aborted. The British also revised the Constitution in 1947 to allow for fairer participation by poorer non-whites in electing representatives in the Legislative Council.

By 1947 Basdeo had also masterminded the boycott of "Les Courses Malbars" which used to be held at Champ de Mars in Port Louis. At the annual festival degrading acts used to be performed by Indo-Mauritians for the amusement of those of other ethnic groups.

One of Jan Andolan's initiatives in the 1940s was to teach villagers how to sign their names in Hindi. In those days only adults who could write their names in English, French or an Oriental language were allowed to vote. At the same time his associates Abdool Wahab Foondun, Permal Soobrayen and Mootoocoomaren Sangeelee promoted the study of Urdu and Tamil. By 1947 Basdeo Bissoondoyal and around 800 Jan Andolan volunteers had engaged in a campaign of mass education. As a result, the number of eligible voters increased from 11,445 to 72,000 in preparation for the 1948 General Elections. This eventually had a massive impact on the results of the 1948 General Elections which was the first ever practice of universal suffrage. A record number of coloured Creoles and Indo-Mauritians were elected to the Council of Government, the equivalent of the modern day Legislative Assembly.

His younger brother Sookdeo, who had become fully involved in politics by 1946 after quitting his 22-year career as a school teacher, was elected to the Legislative Council in the Grand Port-Savanne constituency in the August 1948 elections. He was re-elected in 1953.

By April 1958 the Jan Andolan movement was transformed into the Independent Forward Bloc (IFB), led by Basdeo's younger brother Sookdeo. IFB was an important partner in the coalition of parties that formed part of the Independence Party (Mauritius) which won the 1967 General Elections.

== Publications ==
By 1932 Basdeo published an article in the journal L'Idée Libre in France. He eventually wrote in excess of 275 articles in addition to 20 books in Hindi, 14 in English, 5 in French, and also in Sanskrit over 6 decades. His works have been published in Mauritius, India, Great Britain, France, and the United States. The subject matter of his articles and books were literature, Mauritian, Indian and world history, philosophy, religion, and comparative civilizations.

Notable books written by Basdeo Bissoondoyal were "Life in Greater India: An Autobiography" (1984), "The Truth about Mauritius", "The Essence of the Vedas and Allied Scriptures" (1966), "They Loved Mother India" (1967), and "France Looks at Modern India" (1966).

Another initiative of his movement was the fortnightly newspaper Zamana which was published in Standard Hindi, English and French. Occasionally Zamana also contained articles in Marathi, Tamil and Urdu.

== Legacy ==
In the capital city of Port Louis a statue of Basdeo Bisssondoyal was erected by the municipal council and the Basdeo Bissondoyal Esplanande is also named after him.

Following the 1982 general elections and when Mauritius was not yet a republic Basdeo Bissoondoyal refused Harish Boodhoo's offer to become the first President of a contemplated Republic of Mauritius.

On 8 February 2005 the Basdeo Bissoondoyal Trust Fund Act was passed by the Parliament of Mauritius to help preserve the legacy of Basdeo Bissoondoyal. One of the objectives is to create a Basdeo Bissoondoyal Memorial Library and Documentation Centre at Vallonville Street in Port-Louis where Basdeo lived and planned the activities of his Jan Andolan movement in the 1940s, 1950s and 1960s. It is also expected that the new Act will provide for talks, seminars, conferences, exhibitions, and other activities on the life, work, and writings of Professor Bissoondoyal.
