= Coralie (disambiguation) =

Coralie is a feminine given name. It may also refer to:

- Louis Joseph Coralie (1912–1967), Mauritian politician
- Coralie, Queensland, a locality in the Shire of Croydon, Australia
- Coralie, the French-built second stage of the Europa rocket
- CORALIE, a spectrograph used by the Swiss 1.2-metre Leonhard Euler Telescope
- "Coralie", a song by Slapp Happy from their album, Ça Va

== See also ==
- Coralia
