= Louis Joseph Coralie =

Louis Joseph Coralie (1912–1967) was a Mauritian politician.

== Participation at 1953 and 1959 elections ==
He stood as a candidate in the 1953 Mauritius Legislative Council elections in Grand Port-Savanne but was defeated by Sookdeo Bissoondoyal, Goinsamy Venkatasamy and Louis Philippe Rozemont.

At the 1959 Mauritius Legislative Council elections Louis Joseph Coralie was a candidate at Constituency No.4 Port-Louis Central, at the time when there were 40 constituencies on the island. But only Abdul H.G.M. Issac was elected, defeating rivals Abdool Joomye, Monaff Fakira, Goumade Venchard and Louis Joseph Coralie.

== Newspaper L'Épée ==
In 1954, Louis Joseph Coralie founded the political newspaper L'Epée. The newspaper bought its support to a prolonged anti-Hindu campaign in Mauritius between 1954 and 1962. Joseph Coralie was an ally of the Ralliement Mauricien (now known as PMSD) led by Jules Koenig. L’Épée holds a notable place in the history of the Mauritian press, being regarded as the first newspaper in Mauritius to publish material written in Mauritian Creole. Its pioneering use of the language appeared through the satirical characters Gaby and Soondron, who engaged in conversations written entirely in Creole. Although presented in a humorous and accessible style, their exchanges were not merely entertainment. They were essentially political satire, using the everyday language of the Mauritian people to comment on and criticise the political affairs of the time. In doing so, L’Épée helped establish Mauritian Creole as a language capable of carrying political commentary and social criticism in the written press.

== Controversies ==
On 25 April 1956, Coralie was found guilty of slander and was ordered to pay a considerable fine to Teeluckparsad Callychurn, director of the Mauritius Post Office.

In 1958, Louis Joseph Coralie invented an 'electric' riding crop. Coralie, a member of the Mauritius Turf Club, was suspected of using the electric riding crop in order to win races. Coralie was also charged for conspiracy, but was

never convicted. He was married to Marie Eliane Choyen with whom he had five children. Louis Joseph Coralie died in the United Kingdom in 1967.

During his time in Mauritius, Joseph Coralie resided at Rue Jemmapes, where the offices and printing press of L’Épée were also located. His connection to the newspaper is particularly interesting given his involvement in the printing trade and his business relationship with Joseph Merven, founder of the Merven Lottery. Merven Lottery tickets were printed through Coralie’s printing establishment, reflecting the important commercial connections he had developed in Mauritius. Coralie’s life also extended beyond the island; during the Second World War, he served in the military and fought alongside the British Army in Egypt.
