= Bissoondoyal =

Bissoondoyal is a surname found in Mauritius. Notable people with the surname include:

- Basdeo Bissoondoyal (1906 – 1991), a Mauritian social worker
- Sookdeo Bissoondoyal (1908 – 1977), a Mauritian politician
