= Socio-Cultural Group =

Socio-Cultural Group is a term which is used on the island of Mauritius to refer to private organisations whose primary objectives are to consolidate human and moral values, strengthen the family unit and promote religious and cultural values. These groups are also known as socio-cultural movements or socio-cultural associations.

== History ==
Some of the earliest socio-cultural groups which have survived are the Cutchee Meiman Sunnee Mussulman Society (CMSMS) which was founded in 1852 and the Surtee Sunnee Mussulman Society (SSMS) which dates back to 1890. They set up schools for religious studies. The Indian Cultural Association (ICA) was active in Mauritius in the 1930s and politician Seewoosagur Ramgoolam was ICA's president during his early foray into politics. In the 1940s the Jan Andolan was founded by Basdeo Bissoondoyal when he returned from his higher studies in India. Jan Andolan volunteers contributed to the record participation in the 1948 general elections by teaching eligible adults how to write and sign their name in one of the island's many languages at the Baitkas located in villages and sugar estates.

During the 1960s and 1970s socio-cultural associations contributed to the education of the rural mass which resulted in increased mobility in rural areas of Mauritius. There was a substantial increase in the number of socio-cultural groups following the government's decision in 1962 to subsidise them using state funds. These groups started to play a direct role in politics from the 1963 General Elections.

== Modern trends and features ==
Socio-cultural groups are nowadays heavily involved in local politics and they are generally headed by lobbyists. Some of these lobbyists have even been political nominees on the board of several para-statal bodies and government organisations. There is also an absence of financial audits of these organisations although they receive substantial government funding.

There are a large number of socio-cultural associations which receive direct funding from the government of Mauritius. Each group is associated with a particular religion or ethnic group. Each group's political allegiance changes depending on local conditions and deals that have been made with the main official political parties of Mauritius in exchange for positions as board members in state-run companies, or for promised concessions or change in legislation to favour the group's members.

Critics have suggested that the government should enact fundamental changes in order to remove the involvement of socio-cultural groups in politics and to ensure that they return to their original objectives of promoting religious and cultural values only. One suggestion is to stop all government funding to these groups. Another suggestion is that the socio-cultural groups should be subjected to regular financial audits. The government increased the annual value of grants to religious organisations, which include the socio-cultuyral groups, from Rs 93 Million to Rs 103 Million.

== List of Socio-Cultural Groups ==
The predominant groups include the following:

1. All Muslim Congress (AMC)

2. Arya Ravived Pracharini Sabha (ARPS)

3. Arya Samaj

4. Association Socio Cultural Rastafarian (ASCR)

5. Chinese Cultural Centre (CCC)

6. Chung Hwa Chung Shueh Society

7. Cutchee Meiman Sunnee Mussulman Society (CMSMS)

8. Fédération des Créoles Mauriciens (FCM) (Jocelyn Grégoire)

9. Gahlot Rajput Maha Sabha (GRMS)

10. Groupman Larkansiel Kreol (GLK)

11. Hindu House

12. Hindu Unity Movement (HUM)

13. Hindutva Movement

14. Hua Lien (Castle Bridge Ltd)

15. Human Service Trust (HST)

16. Islamic Circle Quran House (ICQH)

17. Islamic Cultural Centre (ICC)

18. Jinfei

19. Kranti

20. Mauritius Chinese Federation (MCF)

21. Mauritius Marathi Mandali Federation (MMMF)

22. Maratha Mandir Association (MMA)

23. Mauritius Sanatan Dharma Temples Federation (MSDTF)

24. Mauritius Tamil Council (MTC)

25. Mauritius Tamil Temples Federation (MTTF)

26. Mauritius Telugu Maha Sabha (formerly called Mauritius Andhra Maha Sabha)

27. Mission Catholique Chinoise (MCC)

28. Muslim Youth Federation (MYF)

29. Muslim Union

30. Quinze-Cantons Hindu Sewak Sangh

31. Ram Sena

32. Rassemblement des Organisations Créoles (ROC)

33. Seva Shivir

34. Société Islamique de Maurice (SIM)

35. Surtee Sunnee Mussulman Society (SSMS)

36. Swastika Mauritius

37. Tamil League

38. Tamil Union of Mauritius (TUM) also known as Union Tamoule

39. Vaish Mukhti Sangh

40. Veer Ekta

41. Voice of Hindu / Vijayi Om Hamara (VOH)

42. Ohanaeze Ndi Igbo
