= Denise De Chazal =

Mauritian politician

Nominated Member of the Legislative Council
- In office 1948–1953

Personal details
- Born: 25 July 1887
- Died: 27 February 1971 (aged 83)

Thérèse Louise Marie Denise De Chazal MBE (25 July 1887 – 27 February 1971) was a Mauritian politician. In 1948 she became one of the first two female members of the Legislative Council, serving until 1953.

== Biography ==
De Chazal was born Thérèse Louise Marie Denise Baissac, the daughter of Marie Thérèse Louise (née Sauzier) and Louis Edmond Baissac. She married Edmond Marc De Chazal in August 1906 at St Thérèse church in Curepipe, after which she moved to South Africa, where Edmond had been working since 1904. The couple returned to Mauritius in 1908 and had a daughter named Pauline in 1916. She was awarded an MBE in the 1939 New Year Honours for social and charitable services.

Following the 1948 Legislative Council elections, De Chazal was appointed as one of the twelve nominated members, joining Emilienne Rochecouste as one of the two female members of the Legislative Council. She was not reappointed following the 1953 elections.

She was a co-founder of the Maternity and Child Welfare Association, heading it for twenty years. She later became honorary chair of the organisation, a role she held until her death in 1971.
