= 1967 Port Louis riots =

The 1967 Port Louis riots refer to a series of violent clashes and looting in the city of Port Louis, Mauritius.

== August 1967 Elections Riots ==
The 7 August 1967 General Elections were held to determine the nation's support for independence from the British. On the afternoon of the election day, fighting broke out between Muslims against Creoles and Chinese in Constituency No. 3 (Port Louis Maritime and East). Mohamed's Muslim supporters of CAM clashed against Ah Chuen's Chinese and Duval's Creoles of PMSD. CAM supporters destroyed PMSD's cars, blocked roads and rumoured that CAM's Ibrahim Dawood was no longer running for office. Retaliation by PMSD soon followed as they burnt down a house and many civilians were assaulted. The Police Riot Unit (PRU) and Special Mobile Force (SMF) had to intervene and tear gas was used to bring the crowds under control.

== September & October 1967 Riots ==
The government of Mauritius dismissed 10,000 relief workers and soon protesters started to demonstrate in the streets of Port Louis to protest against the loss of their jobs. In the five months leading up to the August 1967 elections, the Labour government had increased the number of relief workers by more than 60% (from 19,290 to 30,887). Many had been waiting at Line Barracks (Police Headquarters) for their pay. The protesters damaged police vehicles, blocked roads and threw rocks at the police. 73 protesters were eventually arrested.

In early October 1967, teenagers assembled at the Employment Exchange in Port Louis to express their interests in finding employment. However, the office was soon ransacked and destroyed by the angry crowd. They blocked roads and armed police had to intervene to restore peace.
