= Independence of Mauritius =

1968 event for the former British colony

Mauritius gained independence from the United Kingdom on 12 March 1968. The independence process was the culmination of a long struggle involving a number of political parties, most notably the Mauritius Labour Party (MLP) and the Parti Mauricien Social Démocrate (PMSD). Independence was agreed in principle at a constitutional conference in London in September 1965, confirmed by a general election and a vote of the Legislative Council in August 1967, and given legal effect by the Mauritius Independence Act 1968. Shortly before independence, the United Kingdom detached the Chagos Archipelago from the colony to form the British Indian Ocean Territory, a step which the International Court of Justice concluded in 2019 meant that the decolonisation of Mauritius had not been lawfully completed.

== Constitutional development (1831–1964) ==
From 1831 the British Governor of Mauritius was assisted by a Council of Government, at first made up of officials and members nominated by the Governor, to which elected members were progressively added. A new constitution in 1947 replaced it with a Legislative Council of 19 elected members, 12 members nominated by the Governor and 3 officials, presided over by the Governor, and a separate Executive Council. At the first election in 1948, the MLP won 12 of the 19 elected seats, and in 1953 it won 14, though it lacked an overall majority because of the nominated members.

Throughout the 1940s and 1950s a movement for independence from the United Kingdom grew, driven by several Mauritian political parties. After the 1953 election, Mauritian representatives pressed for universal suffrage, a ministerial system and more elected members, and by 1959 the MLP-led government had openly adopted the goal of full independence. Constitutional conferences were held in London in July 1955, February 1957 and June 1961. A new constitution followed in 1958, and the post of Chief Minister was created in 1961; Seewoosagur Ramgoolam became Chief Minister in 1962.

In 1960, Harold Macmillan made his "Wind of Change" speech in the Parliament of South Africa in Cape Town, in which, according to a 2014 commentary in L'Express, he acknowledged that the best option for Britain was to give complete independence to its colonies, so that the way to independence had been paved since the late 1950s.

After the 1963 election, Ramgoolam formed an all-party coalition government to negotiate with the British on independence. Under the 1964 Mauritius Constitution Order, he became Premier, with a Council of Ministers appointed by the Governor after consultation with him. In 1964 the United Nations Special Committee on Decolonization reported that the constitution did not allow the representatives of the people to exercise real powers, and that authority remained concentrated in the hands of the British government.

== 1965 constitutional conference ==
=== Background and participants ===
The communiqué of the 1961 constitutional review talks had left open whether Mauritius, once it reached full internal self-government, should become an independent state or enter some form of special association with the United Kingdom or other Commonwealth countries. After a visit to Mauritius by the Colonial Secretary in April 1965, the British government invited the Premier and the leaders of the parties in the legislature, by a despatch of 8 June 1965, to a conference in London. Its main task was to reach agreement on the ultimate status of Mauritius, the timing of the change, and whether it should be preceded by consultation of the people.

The fourth constitutional conference was held at Lancaster House in London from 7 to 24 September 1965. It was chaired by the Colonial Secretary, Anthony Greenwood, assisted by the Parliamentary Under-Secretary, Lord Taylor, with S. A. de Smith as conference adviser. All the parties in the Mauritian legislature attended:

- the Mauritius Labour Party (MLP), led by Seewoosagur Ramgoolam, which had won 19 of the 40 elected seats and 42.3 per cent of the vote at the last election;
- the Parti Mauricien Social Démocrate (PMSD), led by Jules Koenig, with 8 seats and 18.9 per cent;
- the Independent Forward Bloc (IFB), led by Sookdeo Bissoondoyal, with 7 seats and 19.2 per cent; and
- the Muslim Committee of Action (CAM), led by Abdool Razack Mohamed, with 4 seats and 7.1 per cent.

Two independent members of the legislature, J. M. Paturau and J. Ah Chuen, also attended.

=== Debate ===
The main debate was between the advocates of independence and those of continuing association with Britain. According to de Smith, the MLP and the IFB advocated independence, the CAM was not opposed in principle but sought safeguards for Muslim interests, and the PMSD opposed independence, supported free association with Britain and demanded a referendum.

Much of the conference was taken up with whether the change of status should be preceded by "consultation with the people and if so in what form". Supporters of independence argued that the wish of the people had been "amply demonstrated" by the support given in three general elections to parties favouring independence, and that a fresh general election before independence would suffice. They also argued that independence accorded with British policy and that only through independence could Mauritius achieve unity and membership of the Commonwealth and the United Nations. Opponents argued that independence had not been an issue at previous elections, that voters had been influenced by communal considerations, and that the Commonwealth offered precedents for deciding such questions by referendum. They contended that Mauritius was "too small, isolated, and economically vulnerable to be viable as an independent country", pointing to its dependence on sugar exports and its exposure to cyclones. They also argued that, if Britain joined the European Economic Community, Mauritius would obtain better terms as a territory associated with Britain than as an independent state.

=== Agreements and the British decision ===
The delegates agreed, without prejudice to their views on the final status, a framework for a constitution that would apply whichever way that question was decided. They could not agree on an electoral system. Greenwood therefore decided to appoint a commission, guided by principles that included multi-member constituencies, a common electoral roll with no communal rolls, fair representation for the main sections of the population, no encouragement of small parties, no nominated members, and representation for Rodrigues.

Faced with conflicting advice from the parties, the British government made the decision itself. The report noted that the MLP and the IFB, which advocated independence, held 26 of the 40 seats and had won 61.5 per cent of the vote at the last election, and that the CAM would support independence if its conditions on the electoral system were met; but that a significant section of the population was opposed. Greenwood rejected a referendum on the ground that it would prolong uncertainty and "harden and deepen communal divisions". He also rejected the PMSD's proposals for association, on the ground that pressure for independence would continue and the uncertainty would not be removed.

On 24 September 1965, the last day of the conference, Greenwood announced that Mauritius should become independent. After the electoral commission had reported, a general election would be held under the new system. The British government would then fix a date for independence, after six months of full internal self-government, if the new Legislative Assembly passed a resolution asking for it by a simple majority. The government expected that the process could be completed before the end of 1966. The PMSD delegation walked out of the conference before the announcement.

The report also recorded that the first Governor-General of an independent Mauritius would come from outside the island. A defence agreement would be negotiated before independence, providing among other things for consultation in the event of an external threat, for British assistance in internal security, and for the continued use by Britain of its existing facilities at HMS Mauritius and Plaisance airfield. Mauritius would remain eligible for British economic assistance and would continue to benefit from the Commonwealth Sugar Agreement.

=== Electoral commission ===
In January 1966 an electoral commission chaired by Sir Harold Banwell visited Mauritius. Its report, published on 13 June 1966, was accepted by the governing parties and by the PMSD after amendments agreed during a visit by the Parliamentary Under-Secretary, John Stonehouse, from 16 June to 4 July 1966. Under the system adopted, 60 members were to be elected for the island of Mauritius in 20 three-member constituencies and 2 for Rodrigues. Eight further seats went to the unsuccessful candidates who had made the best showing (the Best Loser System), the first four to under-represented communities and the remaining four on the basis of party and community. The constitution, incorporating the proposals of the 1965 conference and the electoral arrangements, was made by the Mauritius Constitution Order 1966 on 21 December 1966.

== Detachment of the Chagos Archipelago ==
During the conference, the United Kingdom held separate private meetings with Mauritian ministers on a proposal, agreed with the United States, to detach the Chagos Archipelago from Mauritius for defence purposes. On 23 September 1965, Ramgoolam and two other ministers agreed in principle to the detachment in return for undertakings that included £3 million in compensation and the return of the islands when no longer needed for defence; the Council of Ministers confirmed the agreement on 5 November, with the PMSD ministers dissenting. The archipelago became part of the new British Indian Ocean Territory on 8 November 1965.

Whether the detachment was linked to independence is disputed. On the morning of 23 September, the Prime Minister, Harold Wilson, told Ramgoolam that he and his colleagues "could return to Mauritius either with Independence or without it", and that Diego Garcia "could either be detached by order in Council or with the agreement of the Premier and his colleagues". According to the political scientist Jean Houbert, the MLP, which was leading the independence negotiations, did not object to the transfer of the archipelago because it feared that doing so might reduce the chances of Britain agreeing to independence. The United Kingdom has argued that independence was announced six weeks before the Council of Ministers agreed to the detachment, and that the move to independence would not have stopped had it refused. In 2019 the ICJ concluded that the detachment "was not based on the free and genuine expression of the will of the people concerned".

== 1967 general election and independence ==
A general election was held on 7 August 1967, and the parties in favour of independence prevailed. The pro-independence coalition won 54% of the vote. Later in August, the new Legislative Assembly passed a resolution asking the British government to implement the decisions taken in London in 1965. The United Kingdom Parliament then passed the Mauritius Independence Act 1968.

Mauritius experienced a period of instability in the weeks before independence: in the 1968 Mauritian riots, six weeks before independence, violence between Creoles and Muslims in Port Louis left at least 25 people dead and hundreds injured, before British troops quelled the fighting. The government declared a state of emergency in response. On 12 March 1968, independence was declared at a ceremony at the Champ de Mars Racecourse, and Ramgoolam became the first Prime Minister. Mauritius was admitted to the United Nations on 26 April 1968. The independence constitution, promulgated by the British government on 4 March 1968, defined Mauritius as the territories that immediately before 12 March 1968 constituted the colony, a definition that did not include the Chagos Archipelago.

== Aftermath ==
Mauritius later claimed sovereignty over the archipelago, and its constitution was amended to list the Chagos Archipelago, including Diego Garcia, as part of the territory of Mauritius. In its 2019 advisory opinion, the ICJ found, by 13 votes to 1, that the decolonisation of Mauritius was not lawfully completed when it acceded to independence in 1968.

== External resources ==
- Independence For Mauritius (1968), British Pathé, Youtube. Newsreel footage of Mauritius' independence ceremony in March 1968.

== Sources ==
- Mauritius Constitutional Conference Report 1965 (PDF). Colonial Office. 24 September 1965. Cmnd. 2797 – via Written Statement of the Republic of Mauritius (ICJ), Vol. III, Annex 64.
- United Nations Secretariat (1967). Working paper on Mauritius, Seychelles and St. Helena (A/6700/Add.8) (PDF) (Report). United Nations – via Written Statement of the Republic of Mauritius (ICJ), Vol. III, Annex 92.
- Toth, Anthony (1995). "Mauritius: Historical Setting". In Metz, Helen Chapin (ed.). Indian Ocean: Five Island Countries. Area Handbook Series (3rd ed.). Washington, D.C.: Federal Research Division, Library of Congress.
- Houbert, Jean (1981). "Mauritius: Independence and Dependence". The Journal of Modern African Studies. 19 (1): 75–105.
- Legal Consequences of the Separation of the Chagos Archipelago from Mauritius in 1965, Advisory Opinion (PDF). I.C.J. Reports 2019. International Court of Justice. 25 February 2019.
- In the Matter of the Chagos Marine Protected Area Arbitration (Mauritius v. United Kingdom): Award (PDF). Permanent Court of Arbitration. 18 March 2015.
- Written Statement of the United Kingdom (PDF). International Court of Justice. 15 February 2018.
