= Yiagadeesen Samy =

Mauritian academic

Born and raised in Mauritius, where he attended the Royal College Curepipe, Yiagadeesen (Teddy) Samy is a Full Professor of International Affairs and the Director at the Norman Paterson School of International Affairs, Carleton University, Ottawa, Canada. He holds a B.A. in Economics and Mathematics from Glendon College, York University, an M.A. in economics from the University of Toronto, and a Ph.D. in economics from the University of Ottawa. His teaching and research interests are in the areas of International Trade, International Finance and Development Economics.
