= Muslim Committee of Action =

Political party in Mauritius

- Founded: 1959
- Ideology: Islam
- National affiliation: CAM

The Muslim Committee of Action, also known as the Comité d'Action Musulman or Comité d'Action Mauricien (CAM) was a political party in Mauritius.

== History ==
The CAM was founded by Sir Abdool Razack Mohamed in February 1959 in preparation for the March 1959 General Elections.

In the early 1950s Abdool Razack Mohamed distanced himself from the Labour Party and became part of the Jules Koenig's Union Mauricienne (UM) which was founded in 1953. Koenig's UM claimed to be the roadblock which would prevent minorities from being swamped away by the Hindu majority. Thus Mohamed explained that minorities such as Muslims would be better protected from Hindu hegemony by Koenig's party, especially with the impending constitutional changes by the British administration. On the UM's platform Mohamed criticised the Labour Party and especially its emerging leader Dr. Seewoosagur Ramgoolam. Mohamed openly accused Ramgoolam of supporting Hindu nationalists. At a 1955 public meeting he warned that Muslims would not be used as a stepping stone to further other politicians' objectives especially on the growing issue of independence from colonial Britain. The local press reported that Mohamed believed that "Muslims do not want an independence whereby we will all be dominated by Ramgoolam". Koenig changed the name of his Union Mauricienne to Ralliement Mauricien shortly before the 1953 elections. In 1953 A.R. Mohamed was nominated for the first time to the Legislative Council as a member of Koenig's new Ralliement Mauricien in Port Louis as fourth member, behind the 3 elected Labour Party candidates. He thus became the first ever Muslim to enter the Legislative Council.

However A.R. Mohamed was not welcome within Koenig's Union Mauricienne. Indeed shortly after the 1953 elections Koenig's party endorsed their defeated candidate's Alex Bhujoharry's protest for a recount of votes after Mohamed was elected ahead of Bhujoharry by 5 votes in Port-Louis. This was soon followed by the white lobby to oust A.R. Mohamed from the Executive Committee of Koenig's Union Mauricienne. The white Franco-Mauritian elite within UM also denied his nomineeship to the Executive Council and chose Osman instead of Mohamed. Finally Koenig's party rejected Abdool Razack's request for a separate electoral roll and reserved seats for Muslims. Groups of Muslims published letters in the press to urge A.R. Mohamed to return to the Labour party. But Mohamed was reluctant to do so due to the presence of his arch-rival Edgar Millien and other factors. Thus in 1959 Abdool Razack Mohamed founded his own party called Comité d'Action Musulman (CAM). Soon afterwards the CAM contracted an alliance with the Labour Party. Seewoosagur Ramgoolam even attended the first meeting of the new CAM which was held in February 1959 at Plaine Verte. Within the Labour Party the alliance was well accepted as Edgar Millien had started to distance himself from the Labour Party. Besides Renganaden Seeneevassen and Guy Rozemont had already died. Earlier in 1956 Seeneevassen had successfully lobbied the government to instigate the Keith-Lucas commission to investigate allegations of fraud during the Mohamed's tenure as Lord Mayor in 1953. Indeed there had been serious allegations of fraud during the 1953 municipal elections in Port-Louis which resulted in Abdool Razack's election to office.

== Splitting of Indo-Mauritian community ==
Despite the CAM's alliance with the Labour Party Mohamed persisted with his demand for a separate electoral roll and reserved seats for the Muslims. His approach had been shaped by the All India Muslim League's strategy of the 1940s which successfully weakened the rising Indian nationalism. Mohamed's approach had the unexpected outcome of arousing communal passions within other communities as other politicians decided to adopt Abdool Razack's communal partitioning approach. The 1957 London Agreement split the Indo-Mauritians into 2 distinct communities: Indo-Mauritian Hindus and Indo-Mauritian Muslims. The Indo-Mauritian Muslim community was thus recognised as distinct section of the population. The Trustram Eve's Electoral Boundary Commission (EBC) introduced a new electoral system and a re-zoning of constituencies in 1959. The EBC facilitated the election of Muslims in some constituencies without having to rely on other communities anymore. Trustam Eve thus enabled Mohamed to position himself as the leader of the Muslim community. As a result during the 1959 general elections 5 Muslims were elected and Abdool Razack received the credit for this achievement. In 1959 he was appointed to his first ministerial position (Minister of Housing).

== Independence Party coalition ==
Following the 1960 visit by Secretary of State Ian Macleod to the island of Mauritius Abdool Razack became aware of the inevitability of independence. Thus changes in the Constitution and electoral system were bound to occur and would once again affect Muslims' representation. The 1965 Constitutional Conference Report outlined the positions of the parties present at Lancaster House and stated that the only 2 parties advocating immediate independence were the Labour Party and Sookdeo Bissoondoyal's Independent Forward Bloc (IFB). The Secretary of State Anthony Greenwood declared that Mauritius had reached the ultimate status for independence and that the 1963 general elections had already been an indicator of the overwhelming support of independence given that when combined the Labour Party and the IFB gathered 61.5% of the votes. The report did not give weight to the indecisiveness of the CAM on the issue of independence. The CAM gathered politician J. Ah Chuen's support to ensure that the Secretary of State developed a formula for safeguarding the interests of minority groups in the Legislative Assembly. This formula became known as the "Best Loser" system which has now survived for several decades.

In 1967 the CAM became part of the coalition called Independence Party which held office after the August 1967 elections in preparation for independence from Great Britain in March 1968 despite the deadly January 1968 Mauritian riots and State of Emergency. The Independence Party consisted of the 3 main parties Parti Travailliste (PTr), Independent Forward Bloc (IFB) and the CAM. This coalition campaigned against the PMSD and a few other minor parties which were opposed to the concept of an independent Mauritius.

In 1976 the CAM suffered electoral defeat in its main constituencies as newer party Mouvement Militant Mauricien (MMM) rose in popularity.
