= Ashvin Dwarka =

Mauritian writer (born 1977)

Ashvin Krishna Dwarka, most commonly known as Ashvin Dwarka (born 1977), is a Mauritian writer and notary.

== Early life ==
Ashvin Dwarka was born in the town of Quatre Bornes on the island of Mauritius. He completed his secondary education at Royal College Curepipe before travelling to France and England where he studied law and taxation. He then worked in France until 2005 before returning to Mauritius in 2006.

== Recognition ==
In 2013 Dwarka was awarded the Jean Fanchette Prize for his novel "Le Neuvième Passage".

== Works ==
- Le Neuvième Passage
- Les Agneaux de Dieu
- The Lawyer’s Confession
