= 1943 Belle Vue Harel Massacre =

- Date: 27 September 1943
- Location: Belle Vue Harel Sugar Estate, Belle Vue Harel, Mauritius
- Caused by: poor labour conditions
- Methods: strikes, riot, clashes with police, rallies
- Result: 4 dead 16 injured Expanded political and economic rights for labourers

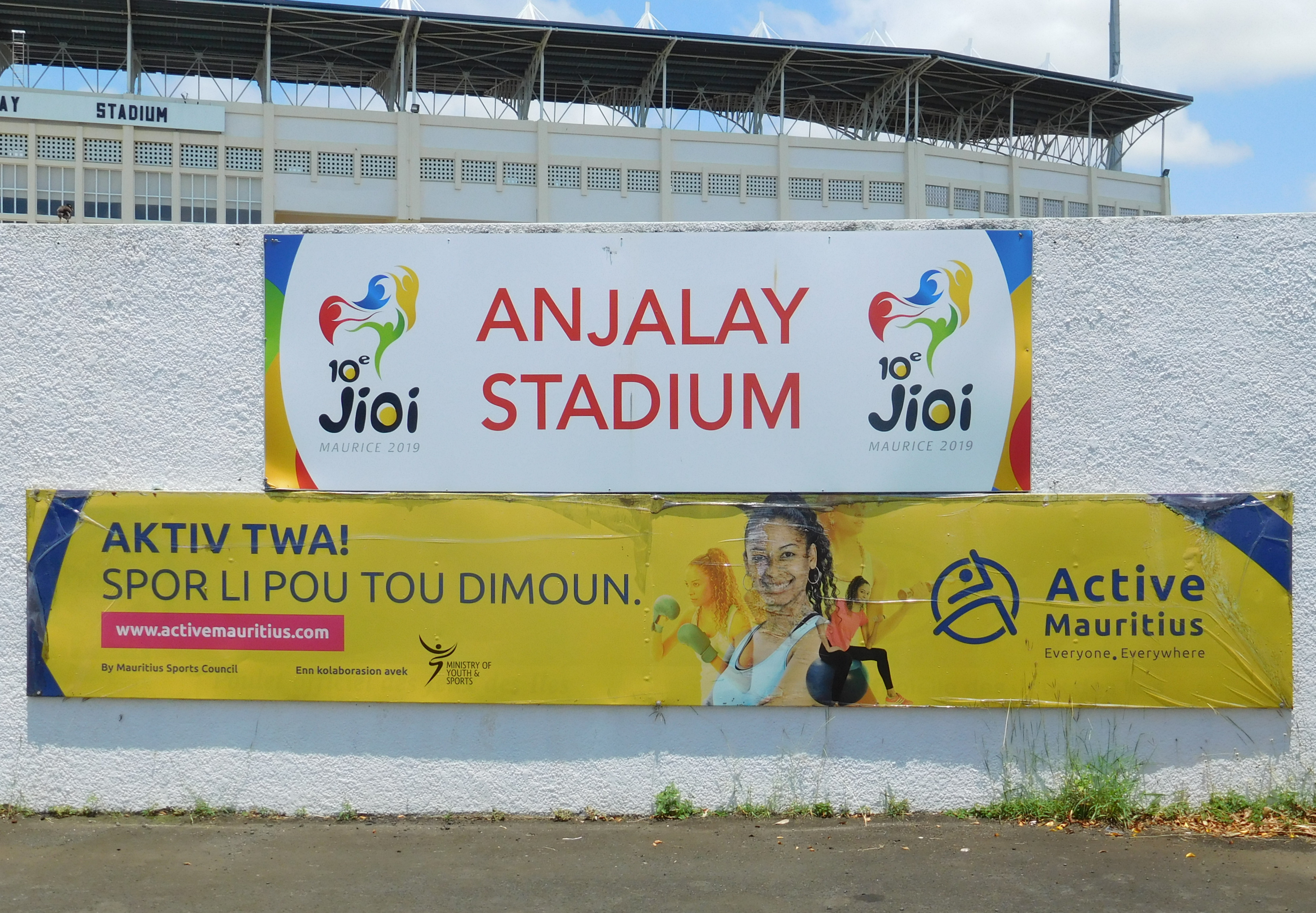

The 1943 Belle Vue Harel Strike refers to a significant strike which escalated into riots amongst labourers working in the fields of the Belle Vue Harel Sugar Estate, near the village of Belle Vue Harel on the island of Mauritius in September 1943. The riots led to the death of 4 people with an additional 16 people being injured.

== Events prior to the massacre ==
=== Letter of demand ===
In December 1942 labourers of Belle Vue Harel Sugar Estate were dissatisfied with the low wages being paid by the estate owners, the Harel and Rousset clans. Four of these workers (Andrée Moonsamy, Hurrynanan Boykount, Sirkisson Seenath and Kistnasamy Mooneesamy) wrote and signed a letter on behalf of all the estate's workers and sent it to the Director of Labour Department to ask for fairer compensation.

=== Strike of 14 days ===
As there was no response to their letter labourers at Belle Vue Harel Sugar Estate started to strike on 13 September 1943 in protest. They nominated Hurryparsad Ramnarain and Sharma Jugdambee to represent their interests on the Conciliation Board. In those days the interests of owners and growers of sugar cane were represented by the Labour Department and it was common practice for such conflicts to be resolved via the Conciliation Board meetings. On 17 September 1943 at a meeting of the Conciliation Board the Labour Department proposed an agreement to the 2 representatives Ramnarain and Jugdambee. Unfortunately these representatives failed to consult with the striking workers. A conflict of interest was also at play given that Ramnarain worked as a propagandist within the Department of Information which was headed by the Acting Director of Labour who also happened to be Chairman of the Conciliation Board. As a result the labourers of Belle Vue Harel rejected the new agreement and refused to resume work. They demanded the appointment of a new Conciliation Board and a fairer agreement.

Seven days later on 24 September 1943 the owners of the sugar estate threatened workers who did not abide by his agreement to leave his sugar estate within 5 days. As the deadline of 29 September approached the owners and Labour Department had made arrangements with the local police to put an end to the strike.

=== Police intervention ===
On 27 September 1943 the workers organised a sit-in within the premises of the sugar estate. Police Constable (PC) Thancanamootoo, of the Criminal Investigation Branch (CIB), disguised as a labourer and was sent to the meeting to check on the striking labourers. However his cover was blown and the workers assaulted him. He fled to the estate manager's office and waited for his boss to arrive. News of P.C. Thancanamootoo's assault reached police quarters located at Line Barracks.

After receiving a telephone call from Line Barracks to go to Belle-Vue, Deputy Commissioner of Police (DCP) Allan M. Bell, who was at Saint-Antoine, headed to Belle-Vue whilst accompanied by 10 policemen under Superintendent Godwin's supervision. At the same time, Assistant Superintendent of Police Albert Jupin de Fondaumière, who was in his thirties, left Port Louis with 25 armed policemen and soon arrived at Belle-Vue. They prepared to arrest PC Thancanamootoo's aggressor, but encountered a crowd of between 200 and 300 men, women, and children armed with sticks and stone. Godwin opined that the crowd was praying where as De Fondaumière thought that they were bluffing and only pretending to be praying. Constable Emraz reported that the crowd was indeed praying. The police officers could not comprehend why they were carrying sticks and stones, and DCP Bell asked Assistant Superintendent (ASP) Ithier to order the workers to surrender these objects. ASP Ithier tried do so, but in vain. He then informed DCP Bell that PC Thancanamootoo's aggressor was in the same crowd, which prompted DCP Bell to order his arrest. Instead the aggressor ran away and was pursued by SP Godwin. At that point the crowd started to assault the policemen. Warning shots were fired to no effect. Confusion ensued, and multiple gun shots were fired. SP Godwin deployed a tear gas grenade, thus enabling the policemen to seek shelter within the sugar mill nearby.

== Deaths and injuries ==
The Moody Commission of Inquiry later heard that 16 shots were fired, resulting in 3 deaths, 5 labourers with bullet wounds and 12 others with slight injuries. Nine days later on 6 October 1943 a fourth labourer (Marday Panapen) died at the Civil Hospital in Port Louis, as a result of his bullet wounds. 2 police officers, including Albert Jupin de Fondaumière, were seriously injured and 14 other policemen suffered light injuries.

The three dead labourers were Soondrum Pavatdan (better known as Anjalay Coopen, a 32 year old pregnant woman), Kistnasamy Mooneesamy (37 year old labourer), and Moonsamy Moonien (14 year old boy). Munien Munusami, who witnessed and survived the 1943 shooting, died in 2006 at the age of 84. Munusami recalled that the shooting outside a baitka had coincided with a religious ceremony and the strike.

== Legacy ==
Basdeo Bissoondoyal, the social worker and founder of the Jan Andolan movement, organised the funeral ceremony of the 4 victims of the police shootings and it was attended by more than 1500 individuals. Hurryparsad Ramnarain fasted for 8 days in a temple in Goodlands. When the fasting was over he convinced the labourers to resume work from 12 October 1943 onwards.

The 1943 Belle Vue Harel Massacre took place 6 years after the Uba riots of 1937 in the same part of the world. Although the root causes are not the same they highlight the struggles and vulnerability of the Indo-Mauritian labourers and planters whose ancestors migrated to Mauritius under the British colonial rule. On 1 October 1943 a Commission of Enquiry was instigated and the Commissioners consisted of S. Moody, Dr. Eugène Laurent, Hon A. M. Osman, Mr the Justice B. Ghanty and His Honour Mr Rampersad Neerunjun. The Moody Commission of Enquiry report (published in 1944) reiterated several findings of the Hooper Commission which had followed the earlier 1937 UBA riots. Moreover they were very critical of the Police and of the Labour Department's failure to resolve this matter peacefully.

The victims of the 1943 massacre at Belle Vue Harel were commemorated by Mauritian singer Siven Chinien in his song L'année 1943 which was released in his 1970s album Ratsitatane, Conscience Noire.

The Government of Mauritius has acknowledged the historical importance of the massacre. Between 1995 and 2007 monuments and statues of Anjalay Coopen have been erected in the capital city Port Louis as well as in the village of Cottage. The Anjalay Stadium was also named after one of the four who died, Anjalay.
