= Royal College Curepipe =

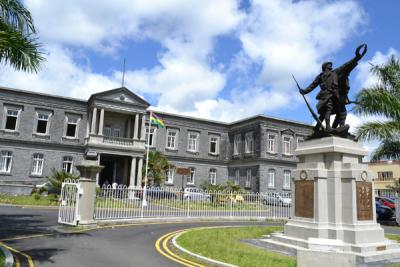
- The current school building completed in 1914

Location
- Royal Road; Curepipe; Mauritius; 20°19′04″S 57°31′25″E

Information
- School type: Public
- Motto: Terrae Quis Fructus Apertae?
- Founded: 1791; 235 years ago
- Rector: Dr Dishain Govind
- Nickname: Grey Kingdom

The Royal College Curepipe (commonly known as RCC) is a secondary school in Mauritius. Founded in 1791, it began producing laureates in the 19th century and has continued to do so over the years.

In the past, it admitted boys based on performance in the Certificate of Primary Education (CPE) exams, according to national rankings. RCC has produced Higher School Certificate (HSC) who have competed for state scholarships for tertiary studies abroad.

Following education system reforms and the introduction of nine year schooling, RCC was converted into an academy in 2021. It became a co-education institution, admitting high-performing male and female students of the National Certificate of Education who have obtained eight aggregates.

== History ==
The Royal College Curepipe is one of the oldest educational institutions of the Republic of Mauritius. Its history dates back to 1791, when the predecessor institution, the Collège National, also known as the Collège Colonial, was founded in Port Louis

It was reserved for the children of the privileged classes of that area, and the college was known as École Centrale in 1800, before renaming to Lycée Colonial from 1803 to 1810 during the final years of the French rule in Mauritius. During this period if was a boarding school and military training was introduced.

For six months after the British conquest in 1810, the Lycée Colonial was used as a military hospital in Port Louis. In 1813 the name of the college was changed by a decree of Governor Sir Robert Farquhar to Royal College.

It relocated from Port-Louis to Curepipe due to the deadly epidemic of 1899 which was more prevalent in the warmer and humid capital city. In 1912 the foundation stone of the present building in Curepipe was laid by Director of Public Works. The design was inspired by the Buckingham Palace of London. The present building was inaugurated in 1914.

== Notable alumni ==
Name	Role
France Antelme	Broker, trader, World War II hero, executed by Germans, Chevalier de la Légion d'Honneur
Roshi Bhadain	Lawyer, accountant and former minister
Charles-Édouard Brown-Séquard	Medical practitioner, physiologist and neurologist, professor at Royal de France
Dayendranath Burrenchobay	Laureate, Electrical Engineer, Knight of British Empire, Permanent Secretary, Governor General
Jayen Cuttaree	Scientist, lawyer, Minister of Labour, Housing and Industry
Maurice Curé	Laureate (1907), Medical practitioner, trade unionist, founder of Mauritius Labour Party, Member of Legislative Council
W. H. Lionel Cox	Laureate (1862), Chief Judge
Ajay Daby	Lawyer and Speaker of Parliament
Gaëtan Duval	Barrister, Lord Mayor (Port Louis), Deputy Prime Minister, Minister of Tourism, Knight of British Empire
Hervé Duval	Senior bureaucrat, Minister of Labour, Minister of Industry
Ashvin Dwarka	Notary, writer
Aqiil Gopee	Laureate (2015), writer
Idrice Goumany	Heroic medical doctor who managed a quarantine center during a smallpox epidemic
Pravind Jugnauth	Former Prime Minister
Gaston Labat	Physician and early pioneer of regional anesthesia
Amédée Maingard	World War II hero, tourism industry pioneer, founder of Air Mauritius and Mauritius Hotels Ltd
Jean Margéot	Bishop and first Mauritian Cardinal
Prem Nababsing	Deputy Prime Minister, Leader of Opposition and Ambassador in France
Raman Osman	Governor-General
Joseph Maurice Paturau	Mechanical engineer, pilot, decorated war hero, business leader and minister
Navin Ramgoolam	Medical practitioner, lawyer, Prime Minister
Seewoosagur Ramgoolam	Medical practitioner, first Prime Minister and Governor-General, Knight of British Empire
Droopnath Ramphul	Judge of Supreme Court
Guy Rozemont	Trade unionist and member of Legislative Council
Yiagadeesen Samy	Professor and school director
Renganaden Seeneevassen	Lawyer and former minister
Harry Tirvengadum	Managing Director of Air Mauritius

== See also ==
- List of secondary schools in Mauritius
- Education in Mauritius
