= Joseph Maurice Paturau =

Mauritian politician

The Right Honourable Maurice Paturau MP

Minister of Commerce, Industry & Tourism
- In office June 1962 – June 1966

Personal details
- Born: 23 April 1916 Saint Pierre, Mauritius
- Died: 26 June 1996 (aged 80)
- Spouse: Irène Claude Lagesse
- Children: Catherine, Françoise and Jean Maurice
- Education: Imperial College London
- Occupation: Mechanical Engineer

Joseph Maurice Paturau, more commonly known as Maurice Paturau (23 April 1916 – 26 June 1996) was a Mauritian engineer, pilot, decorated war hero, cabinet minister, and businessman.

== Early life and education ==
Maurice Paturau was born in Saint Pierre, Mauritius in a colonial family home called Coin de France. His father was Fernand Paturau and his mother was Marthe de Sornay. Maurice Paturau grew up with seven of his siblings.

After completing his secondary education at the Royal College Curepipe, he travelled to England, studied mechanical engineering and aeronautical engineering at the Imperial College London and graduated with first class honours. Then, at the age of 23, he moved to France for further studies and trained to become a pilot.

== Career ==
=== Military ===
When World War II broke out, Paturau, who had both British and French nationalities, served as an officer-in-training based at Bordeaux-Mérignac but was demobilised as a result of the Armistice of 22 June 1940. He then joined de Gaulle's war efforts to liberate France, thus completing 76 military missions and he was awarded many military decorations.

=== Businessman ===
Paturau returned to British Mauritius after World War II and worked for the private firm Forges Tardieu. He encouraged sugar producers to adopt modern technology to remain competitive and by 1946 he became the managing director of Forges Tardieu at the age of 30. He remained at Forges Tardieu until 1962.

After playing an active part in Mauritian politics from 1962 to 1967, Paturau returned to the private sector, namely within the Chamber of Agriculture, at the head of Ireland Fraser, and the Joint Economic Committee (JEC). After 22 years as president of the JEC, he retired in 1994.

=== Politics ===
In early 1962 the exiting Governor of British Mauritius Colville Deverell offered Paturau a seat as a nominated member of the Legislative Council, and by October 1962 the new Governor of British Mauritius John Shaw Rennie appointed Paturau as the Minister of Commerce and Industry. Soon after, he also acquired the portfolio of Minister of Tourism.

Paturau was one of the 28 Mauritian delegates who travelled to London to attend the 5th and last constitutional conference, in preparation for the island's independence from Great Britain. The conference was held at Lancaster House in London from the 7th to the 24th of September 1965.

By 30 June 1966 Paturau left the government and by 20 June 1967, he had finally quit active politics.

== Recognition ==
In 1965 Paturau was awarded the title of "Mauritian of the Year" by local newspaper L’express.

Since 1998 Paturau features on the Rs.50 bank notes of Mauritius.
