= Idrice Goumany =

Dr. Idrice Amir Goumany

Pointe aux Cannoniers Quarantine Centre
- In office 1888–1889

Personal details
- Born: 4 May 1859 Camp des Lascars, Port Louis, Mauritius
- Died: 28 July 1889 (aged 30) Trou-Aux-Biches, Mauritius
- Occupation: Medical Doctor

Idrice Amir Goumany (4 May 1859 – 28 July 1889), also known as Idriss Goomany, was a Mauritian medical practitioner who played an active role in the social welfare on the island of Mauritius.

== Early life, education and family ==
Idrice Goumany was born in Mauritius in 1859. His father was Ameer Goomany, a descendant of a Cochin lascar who owned a business involved in the maritime industry. His mother Rosie Marguerite was a Mauritian Creole of mixed African and French ancestry.

He studied at the original Royal College which was located in the centre of Port Louis before working briefly in his father's business. Idrice then travelled to Scotland where he studied medicine in Glasgow and specialised surgery in Edinburgh.

== Career ==
In 1888 Idrice returned to Mauritius and soon afterwards there was an outbreak of smallpox on the island which rapidly killed thousands of Mauritians. In an attempt to control the epidemic the government opened a quarantine centre at Pointe aux Cannoniers. Beaugeard who was managing the centre also contracted smallpox and died. Despite other doctors' refusal to be involved with the quarantine centre Idrice Goumany came forward and he started to manage the facility. Under his care several patients recovered. However within a year he also contracted smallpox and died at the age of 30 on 29 July 1889.

== Recognition ==
A primary school was named "Dr Idris Goomany Government School" in his honour on Diego Garcia Street, Plaine Verte, Port Louis. His tomb is now located within the compounds of Club Med Hotel in Mauritius. In his memory Assad Bhuglah wrote and published a book in 2017 titled "Dr. Idrice Ameer Goumany: The Forgotten Hero of Mauritius : a Short-lived Blossom of an Emerging Society During Colonial Time".

== See also ==
- List of University of Edinburgh people
