= Emilienne Rochecouste =

Mauritian politician

Member of the Legislative Council
- In office 1948–1953
- Constituency: Plaines Wilhems–Black River

Personal details
- Born: 20 September 1892
- Died: 28 February 1979 (aged 86); Quatre Bornes, Mauritius
- Political party: Independent
- Occupation: School teacher

Marie Louise Emilienne Rochecouste OBE (20 September 1892 – 28 February 1979) was a Mauritian politician. In 1948 she became the first woman elected to the Legislative Council, serving until 1953.

== Biography ==
Born Marie Louise Emilienne Orian in 1892 into a mixed-race Franco-Mauritian family, Rochecouste worked as a primary school teacher and headmistress. She married Raphael Rochecouste in July 1916. During World War II, their son Hervé died while serving in the Royal Air Force.

Rochecouste stood as an independent candidate in the six-seat Plaines Wilhems–Black River constituency in the August 1948 elections. At an executive committee meeting held on 11 July, the Labour Party decided to support her candidacy despite being opposed to the concept of female suffrage. She finished second in the vote, becoming the first woman elected to the Legislative Council. Following the elections, Denise De Chazal was appointed as a second female member. She lost her seat in the 1953 elections, finishing twentieth out of thirty candidates.

Rochecouste was appointed an OBE in the 1958 Birthday Honours. In the 1970s the government school in her hometown of Quatre Bornes was named after her.
