= 1953 Mauritian general election =

General elections were held in Mauritius on 26 and 27 August 1953. The result was a victory for the Labour Party, which won 13 of the 19 elected seats on the Legislative Council. The only other party to win seats was Ralliement Mauricien, which won only two seats. The twelve nominated members were appointed on 11 September. As had happened following the 1948 elections, the Governor Hilary Blood appointed twelve conservatives, largely to ensure the dominance of English and French speakers.

== Results ==
Party	Seats
Labour Party	13
Ralliement Mauricien	2
Independents	4
Appointed members	12
Total	31
Source: Selvon

=== By constituency ===
Constituency	Candidate	Votes	%	Notes
Grand Port-Savanne	Sookdeo Bissoondoyal (Independent)	6,563	17.8	Elected
Grand Port-Savanne	Goinsamy Venkatasamy (Independent)	6,152	16.7	Elected
Grand Port-Savanne	Louis Philippe Rozemont (Labour Party)	5,222	14.2	Elected
Grand Port-Savanne	Marie Léon Alfred Montocchio	5,132	13.9	
Grand Port-Savanne	Jay Narain Roy	4,738	12.9	
Grand Port-Savanne	Juggurnauth Bedaysee	4,262	11.6	
Grand Port-Savanne	Rajmohansing Jomadar	1,535	4.2	
Grand Port-Savanne	Sïmon Rajcoomar Ramjuttun	1,045	2.8	
Grand Port-Savanne	Louis Joseph Coralie	566	1.5	
Grand Port-Savanne	Joseph Robert Marquet	527	1.4	
Grand Port-Savanne	Abdool Ahmed Khan Juhoor	402	1.1	
Grand Port-Savanne	Coonjbeeharry Dwarkasingh	282	0.8	
Grand Port-Savanne	Ramanah Appadoo	205	0.6	
Grand Port-Savanne	Seebarun Keetarut	102	0.3	
Grand Port-Savanne	Rajack Juggessur	71	0.2	
Moka-Flacq	Ackbar Gujadhur (Independent)	6,100	19.2	Elected
Moka-Flacq	Satcam Boolell (Independent)	4,882	15.4	Elected
Moka-Flacq	Veerasamy Ringadoo (Labour Party)	4,709	14.8	Elected
Moka-Flacq	Ramsoumer Balgobin	4,701	14.8	
Moka-Flacq	Satyadeo Salabee	4,550	14.3	
Moka-Flacq	Marie Joseph Jacques Robert Rey	4,284	13.5	
Moka-Flacq	Ashrufaly Bhunnoo	1,176	3.7	
Moka-Flacq	Joseph Renald Laventure	679	2.1	
Moka-Flacq	Appalsamy Jaganah	449	1.4	
Moka-Flacq	Edgar Hector	273	0.9	
Pamplemousses-Rivière du Rempart	Seewoosagur Ramgoolam (Labour Party)	5,031	18.5	Elected
Pamplemousses-Rivière du Rempart	Aunauth Beejadhur (Labour Party)	4,732	17.4	Elected
Pamplemousses-Rivière du Rempart	Harilal Ranchhordas Vaghjee (Labour Party)	4,394	16.2	Elected
Pamplemousses-Rivière du Rempart	Radhamohun Gujadhur	3,884	14.3	
Pamplemousses-Rivière du Rempart	Jean Antoine Henri Latham-koenig	3,770	13.9	
Pamplemousses-Rivière du Rempart	Harryparsad Ramnarain	3,395	12.5	
Pamplemousses-Rivière du Rempart	Pitambar Teeluckdharry	1,115	4.1	
Pamplemousses-Rivière du Rempart	Donald Dieudonné Francis	804	3.0	
Plaines Wilhem-Black River	Jules Koenig (Ralliement Mauricien)	12,496	9.0	Elected
Plaines Wilhem-Black River	Joseph Guy Forget (Labour Party)	10,674	7.7	Elected
Plaines Wilhem-Black River	Roopnarain Bhageerutty (Labour Party)	10,425	7.5	Elected
Plaines Wilhem-Black River	Louis Régis Chaperon (Labour Party)	10,388	7.5	Elected
Plaines Wilhem-Black River	Pierre Gérard Raymond Rault (Labour Party)	10,153	7.3	Elected
Plaines Wilhem-Black River	Françis Soocramanien Chadien (Labour Party)	10,010	7.2	Elected
Plaines Wilhem-Black River	Pierre Louis Gabriel France Rivalland	10,006	7.2	
Plaines Wilhem-Black River	Marie Joseph Clément Dalais	9,951	7.1	
Plaines Wilhem-Black River	Jean Raoul Lamaletie	9,843	7.1	
Plaines Wilhem-Black River	Sylvain Piarroux	8,794	6.3	
Plaines Wilhem-Black River	Henri Gaston Vellin	8,465	6.1	
Plaines Wilhem-Black River	Guy André Labauve D'Arifat	7,571	5.4	
Plaines Wilhem-Black River	Henry Jean Ythier	4,668	3.4	
Plaines Wilhem-Black River	Jean Loïs La Vieux	3,620	2.6	
Plaines Wilhem-Black River	Esaïe David	1,695	1.2	
Plaines Wilhem-Black River	Félix Laventure	1,576	1.1	
Plaines Wilhem-Black River	Moonasur Kooraram	1,299	0.9	
Plaines Wilhem-Black River	Jules Maurice Curé	1,273	0.9	
Plaines Wilhem-Black River	Gunnoo Gangaram	923	0.7	
Plaines Wilhem-Black River	Emilienne Rochecouste	710	0.5	
Plaines Wilhem-Black River	Marie Léon Antoine Pologne	661	0.5	
Plaines Wilhem-Black River	Henri René Stanislas Bouloux	566	0.4	
Plaines Wilhem-Black River	Jacques Clency Dinan	494	0.4	
Plaines Wilhem-Black River	Bernadette Céline	454	0.3	
Plaines Wilhem-Black River	Sujjun Rivermatabudul	419	0.3	
Plaines Wilhem-Black River	Dunputh Luckeenarain	415	0.3	
Plaines Wilhem-Black River	B. Narain Lallah	411	0.3	
Plaines Wilhem-Black River	Juggarnath Goburdhun	376	0.3	
Plaines Wilhem-Black River	Stephen Manicum Aroomanayagum	323	0.2	
Plaines Wilhem-Black River	Marie Isis Coelio Moutia	260	0.2	
Plaines Wilhem-Black River	Malcane Bhookhun	237	0.2	
Plaines Wilhem-Black River	Joseph Lewis Hugon	115	0.1	
Port Louis	Guy Rozemont (Labour Party)	7,878	13.6	Elected
Port Louis	Renganaden Seeneevassen (Labour Party)	7,203	12.5	Elected
Port Louis	Charles Edgar Millien (Labour Party)	7,034	12.2	Elected
Port Louis	Abdool Razack Mohamed (Ralliement Mauricien)	6,880	11.9	Elected
Port Louis	Julius Alexandre Alfred Bhujoharry	6,875	11.9	
Port Louis	Issop Moussa Badat	6,515	11.3	
Port Louis	Jules Henri Constantin	5,841	10.1	
Port Louis	Jean Victor Ducasse	5,516	9.6	
Port Louis	Joseph Marcel Mason	1,327	2.3	
Port Louis	Samuel Benjamin Emile	1,238	2.1	
Port Louis	William Raymond Dupré	788	1.4	
Port Louis	Maswood Phul	413	0.7	
Port Louis	Pierre Jules L'Aiguille	224	0.4	
Total		292,735	100	
Source: Office of the Electoral Commissioner
