= 1937 Uba riots at Union Flacq =

Outbreak of riots and civil disturbances

Uba riots of 1937
- Date: 13 August 1937
- Location: Union Flacq Estate, Mauritius; 20°12′46″S 57°41′33″E
- Caused by: Poor labour conditions unexpected reduction in the price of Uba sugarcane
- Methods: strikes, rioting, clashes with the police, looting, protests, rallies, arson
- Result: Deaths: 1. Sookdeo Gobin; 2. Dawood Lallmahomed; 3. Anadoh Gowree; Injured: 1. Mamode Aniff Ramjan; 2. Arjoon Narain; 3. Abdool Azize Jeanath; 4. Brizlall Beeharry; 5. Sookdeo Koonjbeeharry; 6. Pyandee Veerin; 7. Lutchmun Sungkur; Expanded political and economic rights for labourers

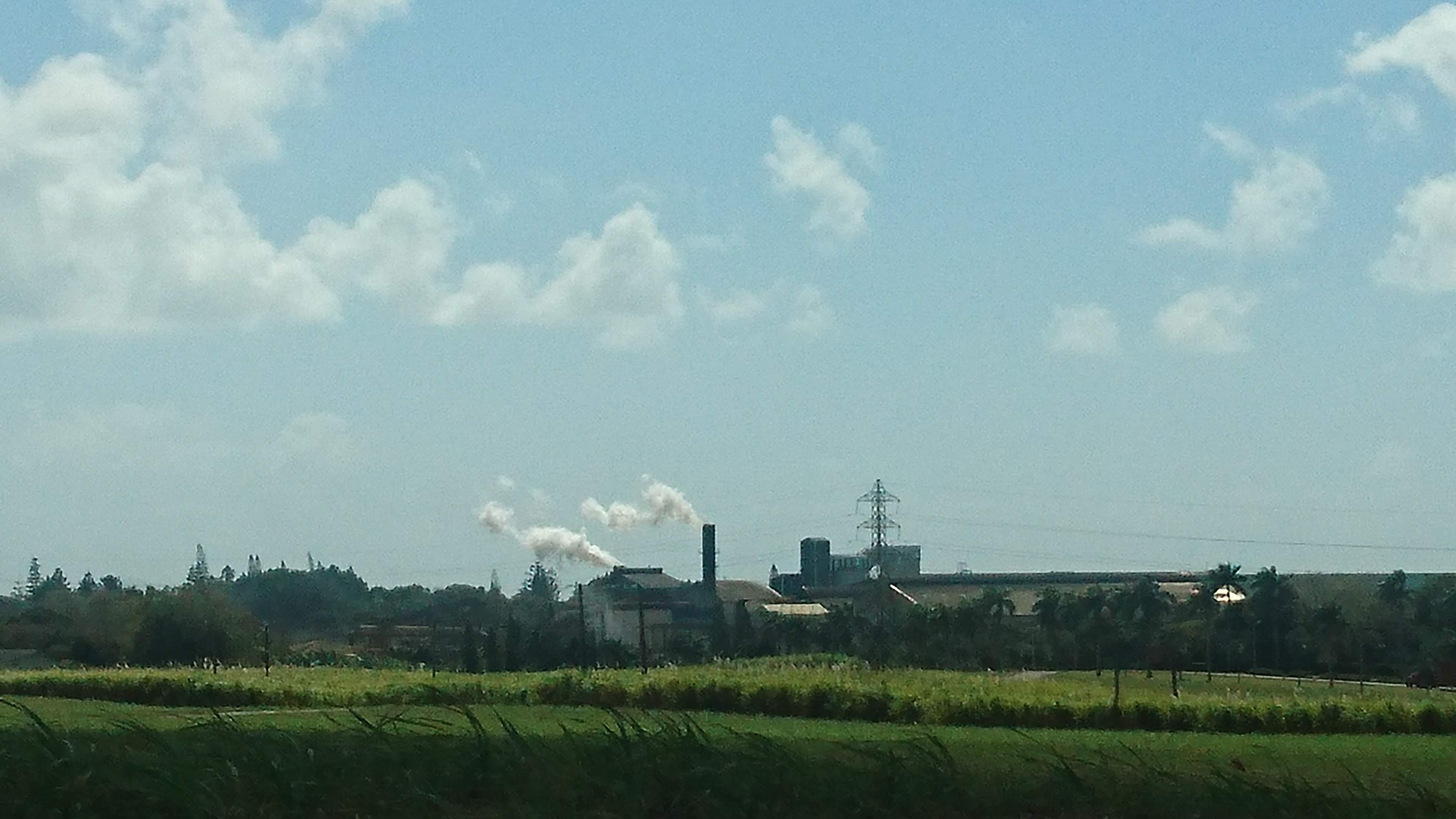
The Union Flacq Estate sugar refinery where the 1937 riot started.

The Uba riots of 1937 or simply the Mauritian riots of 1937 refers to an outbreak of riots and civil disturbances that broke out amongst small scale sugar cane growers on the island of Mauritius in August 1937. The riots led to the death of 4 people with an additional 6 people being injured.

Uba refers to a variety of Saccharum sinense sugarcane commonly cultivated by small hold owning cane growers and labourers at the time who initiated the riots due to an unexpected reduction in the price sugar mills were prepared to pay for the cane.

== Background ==
=== Labour conditions ===
Large sugar estates sold off less productive land to better-off Indian Mauritians from the 1870s onward forming a class of small land owners who came to be known as Sirdars. The Sirdars used family labour to make their sugar plots profitable. The Sirdars also acted as middlemen between sharecropping rural workers and the Franco-Mauritian elite that owned the large Sugar Cane estates. This created a distance between labourers and the land owning elite who ran the Sugar Mills resulting in a lack of any mechanism for the cane labourers to raise grievances with their employers. The owners of the large sugar plantations held a very strong political position within the local government of Mauritius. Both due to their economic power and because the British colonial government was concerned about aggravating pro-French sentiment amongst Franco-Mauritians during the 1800s. Fearing that they would agitate either for independence or to become a French colony again as advocated by the Retrocessionist Movement or Retrocession Movement which was active at that time. This further prevented labour reform on the island and aggravated the difficult working conditions of the sugar cane labourers.

To help address this issue and improve overall working conditions for rural labourers the Mauritian Labour Party (MLP) was founded on the 23 February 1936 by Dr Maurice Curé and Emmanuel ‘Jacques’ Anquetil.

=== Uba price ===
Many small scale farmers planted the hardier but less productive Uba variety of sugarcane. Although Uba produced more cane by weight it also had a lower sucrose content than traditional varieties of sugarcane meaning that the mills would produce less refined sugar from it. Since the growers of sugarcane were paid by weight the sugar refineries experienced lower profits whilst the growers were paid more per harvest. In July 1937, at the beginning of that year's sugarcane harvest, the sugar refineries announced that they would only accept Uba cane for fifteen percent less than regular sugarcane. This combined with the depressed state of the sugar market internationally put great economic strain on growers.

Following the announcement of the fifteen percent reduction in the Uba cane price labourers on the Rich Fund estate asked the Sirdars or managers to intervene to raise the price. After getting no satisfaction the labourers went on strike and caused a number of minor disturbances. Due to similar strikes in Trinidad at the time the British government in Mauritius initially sought a conciliatory approach whilst the Labour Party held rallies calling for political and economic reform. By mid-August the strikes had spread to other sugar estates across the island. The government sought to negotiate with the sugar refineries to increase the price of Uba cane but a few estates refused. One of the estates that refused to increase the price, the Union-Flacq estate owned by Rajcoomar Gujadhur, became the target of arson attacks and property damage. This along with a suggestion by the police to deal with their own security lead to the stockpiling of weapons on the estate.

== Riots ==
On the 13 August 1937 around 200 small planters and labourers marched towards the refinery at Union-Flacq. On their way they had overturned trucks, cut telephone wires and set fire to sugarcane fields at L’Unité. At Bel Etang they overturned tramways. Armed staff at the refinery met the demonstrators who then attempted to storm the facility where Deoranarain Gujadhur and Ramnarain Gujadhur were on duty. Fearing for their personal safety the Gujadhurs fired on the demonstrators, killing 3 labourers and wounding at least 7 more. Sookdeo Gobin, Dawood Lallmahomed and Anadoh Gowree died at the scene after being shot at the sacrum and legs. Seriously wounded labourers included Mamode Aniff Ramjan, Arjoon Narain, Abdool Azize Jeanath, Brizlall Beeharry, Sookdeo Koonjbeeharry, Pyandee Veerin and Lutchmun Sungkur. The protesters dispersed whilst setting fire to surrounding sugar cane fields. Word spread and protests lasted for an additional two weeks across the island.

== Impact on workers' rights ==
Following the 1937 Uba riots the Hooper Commission of Enquiry was immediately instigated by the Government of Mauritius. During the commission's hearing Rajcoomar Gujadhur, as well as Ramnarain Gujadhur and Deonarain Gujadhur, left Mauritius on board the British India ship SS Quiloa for Colombo and Calcutta on 24 December 1937. When the Hooper Commission published its findings the local British government repealed the ban on labour unions in 1938, created a framework for collective bargaining, and setup the Mauritian Department of Labour whilst also creating institutions to help arbitrate grievances between employers and labourers. The legalising of labour unions in addition to the other reforms also greatly enhanced labour conditions. The incident also led to the democratisation of agricultural extension and research services to small scale sugarcane farmers. Thereby increasing their access to technology and improving their long-term economic standing.

About a year after the 1937 Union Flacq massacre dockers in Port Louis also went on strike in September 1938, thus crippling the island's only port and its economy. The Moody Commission of Enquiry of 1943 which was instigated following the Belle Vue Harel Massacre also highlighted the inadequate remuneration and conditions of those working in the Mauritian sugar industry.

== Impact on politics ==
The deadly 1937 protest had a significant impact on the Labour Party (Mauritius) which had been formed a year earlier. The dockers' strike of September 1938 in Port Louis prompted Governor Sir Bede Clifford to declare a state of emergency. Labour Party leaders Sahadeo, Curé and Anquetil also became targets of the British colonial administration. Dr Curé was placed under house arrest, Anquetil was deported to Rodrigues and Pandit Sahadeo was placed under house arrest for almost 2 weeks. Despite Anquetil's exile and the house arrest of Sahadeo and Curé the profile of the Labour Party was greatly enhanced helping to create the conditions for it to join forces with the IFB and CAM to form the first governing alliance (Independence Party (Mauritius) of an independent Mauritius 30 years later in August 1967.

== Commemoration ==
Those that died in the event were commemorated by Mauritian singer Siven Chinien in his song 1937 L'année Memorable which was released in his 1970s album Ratsitatane, Conscience Noire.
