= 1906 Pagoda riots =

Violent clashes in Mauritius between 1900–1906

- Date: 1900 to 1906
- Location: Port Louis, Mauritius
- Caused by: Ethnic tensions between Hakka, Cantonese and Fukienese clans in Mauritius; Political rivalries
- Methods: rioting, assault, destruction of property

The 1906 Pagoda riots refer to violent clashes which erupted in Port Louis on the island of Mauritius between 1900 and 1906.

== Events prior to the 1906 riots ==
The Cantonese and the Fukienese were the only two clans of Chinese people which held political and cultural power which their leader Hayme firmly established in Mauritius. The mixed-blood clan of Hakkas or Macayah had a much lesser influence in society as they arrived on the island after the Cantonese and the Fukienese. Hayme was succeeded by Afan Tank Wen who was the ethnic leader until his death in June 1900. The town had been a relatively peaceful settlement, as the previous serious civil disorder dated back to more than 50 years earlier in the form of the 1850 Yamsé Ghoon Riots.

== Clash of rival clans ==
Afan Tank Wen's death enabled the Hakkas to question the Cantonese clans' stronghold on political and cultural matters in Port Louis where most people of Chinese origins resided. Soon the three clans started to aggressively fight for leadership over Cohan Tai Biou Pagoda which was regarded as the religious and political headquarters of the Chinese community living in Mauritius. As a result, there were frequent violent clashes between members of the rival clans. The pagoda, which is located at Les Salines in Port Louis, is also known as Kwan Tee Pagoda and was built in 1842, thus making it the oldest such institution in the Southern Hemisphere.

== Supreme Court ruling ==
Eventually the Supreme Court of Mauritius intervened by issuing a decree on 21 June 1906 to resolve the conflict. The court stipulated that the Cohan Tai Biou pagoda would be managed by a committee of 15 members from all 3 rival clans. Furthermore, the pagoda's presidency would have a tenure of 1 year to be held by a member of each of the 3 different Chinese ethnic groups in rotation.

== Aftermath of Supreme Court ruling ==
The novel requirement to share power among the 3 rival clans broke the tradition of vesting absolute authority in a single elected leader. It affected the long-held mechanism of maintaining unity within the community. Besides it reduced the leader's prestige when negotiating with the colonial government, thus eroding Chinese community's influence in Mauritius.
