= Commonwealth Sugar Agreement =

International trade agreement

The Commonwealth Sugar Agreement ("CSA") between the United Kingdom and the Commonwealth exporting territories was signed in December 1951. It provided for export quotas totalling 2,375,000 tons of raw sugar. Australia, in accordance with the agreement reached in the 1949 sugar negotiations, received a quota of 600,000 tons. Out of the total quotas of 2,375,000 tons, 1,640,000 tons would be purchased by the United Kingdom Ministry of Food at a price to be negotiated annually, which would be calculated to provide a reasonably remunerative return to efficient producers.

The Commonwealth Sugar Agreement terminated in 1974.
