= Emmanuel Anquetil =

Mauritian politician

- Born: Emmanuel Jean Baptiste Caromi Anquetil; 18 August 1885; Bassin Estate, Plaine Wilhems
- Died: December 1, 1946 (aged 61)
- Known for: Co-founder of the Mauritius Labour Party

Emmanuel Anquetil (1885-1946) was a Mauritian trade unionist, and the second leader of the Mauritius Labour Party.

== Early life ==
Emmanuel (Jean Baptiste Caromi) Anquetil was born on 18 August 1885 at the Bassin Estate, Plaine Wilhems, to Jean Volmy and Marie Angela Anquetil. Anquetil left Mauritius as a 16 year old ship's apprentice, spending 11 years working on coasters in the Australian seas.

Anquetil left Australia for England in 1912, arriving in Liverpool docks in 1913. After being unable to enlist in the Royal Navy, he would spend the World War I years as a Petty Officer in the Merchant Navy, in Admiralty Transport on Atlantic convoys carrying goods and passengers between England and America.

After the war, Anquetil worked mainly on coastal ships from Liverpool, picking up minerals from local mines on the west coast of Wales. Post-war continued to be difficult times for the working classes including seamen in Great Britain - 'through the 1920s, Britain's economy was already struggling to pay for the effects of World War I'. Work continued to be hard and low-paid, with workmen at loggerheads with factory and mine owners culminating in strikes and lock-outs such as the Miners Strike of 1926. The Trades Union Congress called a General Strike in 1926 in support of the mine workers which lasted 9 days from 3 – 12 May. Seamen like Anquetil, docking into Port Talbot, were not immune to these hardships, signing up to each voyage and becoming aware of the activities of workmen and trade unionists in ports and industrial towns like Aberafan, across Great Britain.

Anquetil met Sinah Lane, the daughter of a local miner and herself a Labour Party activist, at a local socialist rally. They married in 1922 and had a son David John. Both Emmanuel and Sinah were active in the Independent Labour Party, working towards the successful election of the local Member of Parliament. Emmanuel and Sinah attended meetings and rallies by trade unionists and Labour Party members such as James Griffiths, Aneurin Bevan, Willie Cove and Ramsay MacDonald Aberavon Member of Parliament the 1st Labour Party Prime Minister in 1924. Anquetil was known locally for his passionate speeches at meetings and rallies in Welsh. The tough times continued with high unemployment and low wages as a result of the worldwide Great Depression from 1929 until the start of World War II. Particularly hardest hit by economic problems were the industrial and mining areas in the north of England, Scotland, Northern Ireland and Wales. Unemployment reached 70% in some areas at the start of the 1930s (with more than 3 million out of work nationally) and many families depended entirely on payments from local government known as the dole’. Ramsay MacDonald won the parliamentary seat of Aberafan from the Liberal Party in 1922 and the Labour Party has held it ever since. And so he did his best to support his family.

== Labour Party ==
When he returned to Mauritius, he helped found the Labour Party with Dr. Maurice Curé, and fought for the rights of labourers and workers. He saw much injustice and was of opinion that "the workers on the sugar estates were better off when they were slaves". Following the Uba riots of 1937 Anquetil was deported to Rodrigues by the British colonial government for organising strikes in defence of dockers' rights in 1938. He spent much time touring the island campaigning for a more liberal form of government, and took part in debates on the revision of the constitution.

== Death ==
His long tours around the island affected his health, and he died in 1946 of pneumonia before the new constitution came into being. He was succeeded by Guy Rozemont as leader of the Labour Party.
