= 1965 Mauritius race riots =

Christian–Hindu/Muslim clashes in southern Mauritius

The 1965 Mauritius race riots in Trois Boutiques refers to a number of violent clashes that started in the village of Trois Boutiques, Souillac on 10 May 1965 and progressed to the historic village of Mahébourg. The unrest eventually led to the declaration of a nationwide State of Emergency on what was then a British colony. This was well before the subsequent 1966 riots and 1968 riots associated with the 1967 elections which preceded the country's independence on 12 March 1968. The first two victims of the riots were Police Constable Jacques Pierre Clément Beesoo and civilian Robert Brousse de Laborde (28 years old) in Trois Boutiques. News of the Trois Boutiques murders spread to surrounding areas. In the coastal historic village of Mahébourg a Creole gang assaulted the Hindu and Muslim spectators who were watching a Hindustani movie at Cinéma Odéon. Mahébourg police recorded nearly 100 complaints of assaults on Indo-Mauritians.

== Events prior to the 1965 Riots ==
British forces had mostly withdrawn their troops from the island of Mauritius by 1960. The King's African Rifles (KAR) regiment had been present there until 1960 for more than 150 years. At the time of the 1965 riots the local police force was in a state of transition as the Special Mobile Force had been created in 1960 as a successor to the departed KAR regiment.

Earlier in 1965 there had been a political assassination in the suburb of Belle-Rose in the town of Quatre Bornes. Rampersad Surath who was a Labour Party supporter was beaten to death by violent thugs from rival party PMSD during a street rally. Coupled with the May 1965 riots, there was a sense of fear and local forces were unprepared to deal with such violence. As a result a State of Emergency was declared by the Governor Sir John Shaw Rennie in May 1965 which lasted for the rest of that year.

== Intervention by British troops from Yemen ==
Operation Fishplate was initiated by Great Britain and this involved the mobilisation of Coldstream Guards from Aden, Yemen to the island of Mauritius. The Coldstream Guards eventually left Mauritius in July 1965.

== Consequences of 1965 riots ==
Following the arrest of several suspects, there were lengthy trials which ended with the jailing of at least a dozen of the aggressors. Furthermore, there were improvements in the size and training of anti-riot intervention police.
