= 1951 La Citadelle murders =

Two murders in Port Louis, Mauritius

1951 La Citadelle murders or L'affaire Pic Pac refer to the two murders which took place at Fort Adelaide or "La Citadelle" in the capital city Port Louis, on the island of Mauritius in 1951.

== Background ==
On 3 October 1951 two school children who were walking home after school were lured and kidnapped. Rabia Mokadam (five years old) and her brother Jaimuddin Mokadam (eight years old) were taken to the abandoned military complex of Fort Adelaide (or La Citadelle) where they were raped and drowned in old water tanks.

== Investigation and trials ==
During the investigation more than 300 persons were interrogated by police which led to 15 arrests. In 1952 three habitual criminals, Noël Jérôme Juillet (Pic Pac), France Cangy (Le Roi) and Paul Célestin (Le Fou), were found guilty of the abduction, rape and murder (by drowning) of the two children before being sentenced to death. Pic Pac claimed his innocence just before hanging.
