= Guy Rozemont =

Mauritian trade unionist

The Honorable Marie Joseph Guy Rozemont
- Born: November 15, 1915; Souillac Street, Port Louis
- Died: March 22, 1956 (aged 40); Victoria Hospital, Quatre Bornes, Mauritius
- Monuments: Guy Rozemont Square
- Education: Royal College of Curepipe; St Joseph's College, Curepipe
- Occupation: Trade Unionist
- Political party: Mauritius Labour Party
- Spouse: Elsie Commins
- Children: Guito Rozemont

Guy Rozemont (1915–1956) was a Mauritian trade unionist and the third leader of the Mauritius Labour Party. He fought for workers' rights and voiced against the injustice done against them. He played a crucial role in shaping the government, political culture and foreign policy of modern Mauritius.

== Early life ==
Marie Joseph Guy Rozemont was born on 15 November 1915, the son of Joseph Alexis Anatole Rozemont and Josephine Marthe Danré. His father was an employee of the shipping company Ireland Fraser Ltd. At the age of four, he moved with his parents and younger siblings from Port Louis to Beau Bassin. He went to primary school in Rose Hill (École des Sœurs, then École du Saint-Enfant Jesus) and later studied at the Royal College of Curepipe and St. Joseph's College, Curepipe. When his father died in January 1931, he was forced to leave school at the age of 16 to work as a labourer in a sugar mill and as assistant on lorries. He went on to become a sailor on a fishing boat, just as Emmanuel Anquetil, his mentor, did before becoming the leader of the Mauritius Labour Party. He had also served as an attendant at the military hospital Floreal.

== Public life ==
Rozemont became active in public life at the age of 23. He spoke for the first time at a meeting of the Labour Party at the theater in Port Louis on August 23, 1942. His fellow-trade unionist and mentor, Emmanuel Anquetil was then the chairman of the Labour Party, having succeeded Dr Maurice Curé, the party's founder.

Rozemont was an orator in the Mauritian Creole language. In 1947, he held public meetings denouncing what he said were the evils of capitalism and condemned what he saw as the indifference of official and unofficial representatives of the people in the Legislative Council. Rozemont fought for workers' rights and called for the nationalisation of certain industries, a housing plan and a pension for all workers, and retirees, health care for all, unemployment benefits, and compulsory education. He also advocated the establishment of cooperatives.

== First popular elections ==
In the 1940s, the Labour Party campaigned for the proclamation of a holiday for workers (Labour Day) and for the extension of the franchise. Rozemont called for the abolition of the poll tax, which would give workers the opportunity to elect representatives to the Legislative Council. The colonial government accepted the idea of constitutional reform and on October 29, 1946, the British governor Donald Mackenzie-Kennedy submitted to the council the Government's proposal for a new constitution. Because it kept the census voting and other elements that were understood to be detrimental to the working class, the proposal was completely rejected by the Labour Party during a public meeting in St Pierre on 1 December 1946. On the platform were: Emmanuel Anquetil, S. Salabee, Renganaden Seeneevassen, Guy Rozemont, Edgard Millien and Seewoosagur Ramgoolam.

When Emmanuel Anquetil suddenly died on December 25, 1946, Guy Rozemont, then secretary-general, was promoted to president of the party, becoming its third leader. Thus Guy Rozemont served as president of Mauritius Labour Party from 1947 until his untimely death in 1956. Two days after his appointment, Rozemont demanded the replacement of the Governor Kennedy by the British Labour Party, which was currently in power in the United Kingdom. The struggle for constitutional reform continued and the colonial government ultimately approved a new constitution that increased the number of voters seven-fold.

"Under the old constitution of 1885 the number of electors stood at 11,844 in 1946. Immediately after the approval of the new constitution the registration of electors was completed in 1948 and their number rose to 71,569."

The following table shows the number of electors in each electoral district.

Electoral district	Number of electors
Port Louis	13.389
Pamplemousses & Riviere du Rempart	10,007
Moka & Flacq	10,204
Grand Port Savanne	12,641
Plaines Wilhems & Black River	22.567

The first general elections under the new constitution were held on 9 and 10 August 1948. Guy Rozemont was elected in first place in Port Louis. The 19 elected members of the 1948 Legislative Council also included Aunauth Beejadhur, Jaynarain Roy, Emilienne Rochecouste (born Orian), Edgard Millien, Raymond Rault, Guy Forget, Sookdeo Bissoondoyal, Sookdeo Balgobin, Ramsoomer Balgobin, Seewoosagur Ramgoolam, Harilall Vaghjee, Raoul Rivet and Jules Koenig. They proceeded to legislate constitutional reforms to expand the electoral base significantly. Guy Rozemont also introduced a motion on April 29, 1949, to make Labour Day a public holiday in Mauritius. Though Labour Day had first been celebrated on May 1, 1938, in Champ de Mars, it was not until 1 May 1950 that it was officially celebrated, after being decreed a public holiday by the Legislative Council.

== The first constitutional conference in London ==
Calls for reform by the Labour Party in London are reviewed by the Constitutional in 1955. Representatives of the Labour Party were Guy Rozemont, Dr. Seewoosagur Ramgoolam, Renganaden Seeneevassen and Guy Forget. The deliberations known on the new Constitution of Mauritius were held in London from 12 to 20 July 1955. The Labour Party's demands for reform were torpedoed by the Conservatives and the Secretary of State by adding proportional representation among the proposals of the reform. "The demands of the Labour Party will be taken into consideration at the first Constitutional Conference in London (1955) ... However, the main demands of the Labour Party concerning universal adult suffrage and a responsible Government will be torpedoed, the British Secretary of State has accepted at the request of the Conservatives, the voting system in the form of proportional representation. The Labour Party resolutely opposed the proportional Representation - this method of voting is likely to lead ideological divisions and anarchy - will be called to fight this proposal in the 2nd Constitutional Conference in London (1957). " From this it was clear that Guy Rozemont and the Labour Party were dead against communalism.

The President of the Labour Party, Guy Rozemont, did not have the privilege to take part in the second constitutional conference in London. He died March 22, 1956.

== Personal life ==
Guy Rozemont married Elsie Commins (born 1910, daughter of Walter Hugh Commins and Valentine Béchard) in St Ignace's Chapel, Rose Hill, in September 1946. They adopted Guy's brother's son, Guito Rozemont. In September 1954, his wife died of a thrombosis aged forty-four, after which he lived alone with his son, but turned increasingly to alcohol in his bereavement. On 22 March 1956, Guy Rozemont died in Victoria Hospital, Quatre Bornes having been visited by his contemporaries, Seewoosagur Ramgoolam and Renganaden Seeneevassen. A requiem Mass was held at the Sacré-Cœur church in Beau Bassin, attended by the British governor, the French consul and the mayor of Port Louis, with 45,000 people gathered outside according to Le Mauricien (23 March 1956).

== Memorial ==
In memory of Guy Rozemont, a monument was erected in Port Louis and the place where the monument stands has been named Guy Rozemont Square. The headquarters of the Mauritius Labour Party is found there. In addition, several streets in Mauritius, a primary government school in Port Louis and a stadium in Quatre Bornes, among others, have been named after this eminent personality.

== See also ==
- Sir Seewoosagur Ramgoolam
- History of Mauritius
- Emmanuel Anquetil
