= Maurice Curé =

Dr. Jules Maurice Curé

Member of Council of Government
- In office 1934–1935

Founder & Leader of Parti Travailliste
- In office 1936–1941
- Succeeded by: Guy Rozemont

Nominated member of Council of Government
- In office 1948–1950

Nominated member of Council of Government
- In office 1964–1967

Personal details
- Born: Jules Maurice Curé; 3 September 1886 Long Mountain, British Mauritius
- Died: 2 March 1977 (aged 90) Curepipe
- Citizenship: British Mauritius
- Party: Action Libérale Retrocessionist Party Labour Party National Socialist Workers Party

Maurice Curé (1886–1977) was one of the founders of the Labour Party in Mauritius in 1936.

== Early life ==
Jules Maurice Curé was born on 3 September 1886. He completed his secondary education at Royal College Curepipe where he was a "Laureate" in 1906, along with his peers Fernand Maingard and E. Osmond Barnard. He travelled to England at the age of 20 to study medicine under scholarship.

== Political career before launching the Labour Party ==
Soon after returning to Mauritius in 1913 Curé joined Dr Eugène Laurent's party Action Libérale and as a result he was appointed as Medical Doctor of the Municipality of Port Louis. He also joined the Retrocessionist Party which advocated that Mauritius should be turned into a colony of France rather than England. This made him an enemy of the Franco-Mauritian oligarchy which favoured England over France as the parent state. Curé was even prosecuted as an enemy of the state for his standpoint.

Curé was defeated in the 1924 municipal elections of Port Louis by his former comrades of the Retrocessionist Party (Edgar Laurent et Raoul Rivet). From 1934 to 1936 he was a councillor at the Municipal Council of Port Louis. He was only elected once to the Council of Government (equivalent to the modern day Parliament or Government House) in the 1934 by-elections when he defeated Oligarchy's candidate Amédée Hugnin. He was defeated in the general elections held in 1921, 1926, 1931 and 1936.

== Founder of the Labour Party (Mauritius) ==
Following his defeat at the General Elections of January 1936 in the district of Plaines Wilhems Dr Maurice Curé decided to form a new political organisation which could best defend the cause of the workers. Thus on 23 February 1936, and with the assistance of Jean Prosper, Mamode Assenjee, Hassenjee Jeetoo, Barthelemy Ohsan, Samuel Barbe, Emmanuel Anquetil, Godefroy Moutia and Dajee Rama (also known as Arya Samaj's Pandit Sahadeo), Dr Maurice Curé registered and launched the Labour party which advocated the improvement of working conditions of the labourers and artisans. Soon the team's countrywide campaign increased the awareness of the Indo-Mauritian labourers about the need for fairer representation and compensation. As the leader of the Labour party Dr Maurice Curé toured the island to hold public meetings and to claim major reforms.

== 1937 UBA riots and 1938 Dockers' Strike ==
Dr Curé's new approach surprised the establishment which was led by aristocratic Governor Sir Bede Clifford. British colonial policy in Mauritius was to maintain unquestionable loyalty of Indo-Mauritians to British rule. Prior to the Labour Party's new campaign Eugène Laurent's Action Libérale had urged Indians to register as voters, but only to raise the Secretary of State Lord Crewe's concerns about the threat of arousing Indo-Mauritians' interest in politics. A year later the Uba riots of 1937 at Union Flacq Sugar Estate (owned by the Gujadhur family), which resulted in 6 dead and more wounded labourers, left no option for Governor Sir Bede Clifford other than to instigate the Hooper Commission of Inquiry to prevent a worsening of the situation.

In September 1938 the dockers' strike in Port Louis crippled the national economy as 3000 dockers refused to load and unload ships at the island's only harbour. A violent crackdown by the establishment followed which resulted in Curé being placed under house arrest in Curepipe for 12 days. His colleague and trade unionist Emmanuel Anquetil was arrested at his home in Rose-Hill, jailed at Line Barracks (Casernes Centrales) in Port Louis, before being deported for 2.5 months to Rodrigues with his son onboard British warship MV Bontekoe. The remaining leaders of the Labour Party were also targeted as Pandit Sahadeo was placed under house arrest, Assenjee (party treasurer), Marc Abel (chief party agent), and Emile Pitchen (party agent) were subjected to strict police surveillance. Furthermore 287 striking dockers were arrested and jailed by the colonial police. Newspapers Le Mauricien and Le Cernéen adopted a neutral stance by neither supporting the strike action, nor criticising the government's crack-down.

== Persecution by sugar oligarchy and colonial government ==
The establishment led by Franco-Mauritian sugar oligarchs (with Governor Sir Bede Clifford's support) continued to persecute the leadership of the Labour party and Dr Maurice Curé's medical practice was no longer profitable. As a result of the harassment and due to mounting competition within the Labour Party's leadership, Curé resigned from the Labour Party in 1941. He was bankrupt and had to close down his newspaper Le Peuple Mauricien. On the day of its closure Curé had no choice other than to beg to afford his bus ticket to return to his home in Curepipe. Curé was succeeded by Guy Rozemont as leader of the Labour Party.

== Nomination to Council of Government ==
In 1948 Governor Mackenzie Kennedy nominated Dr Maurice Curé to the Council of Government. This was followed by another nomination to the Executive Council, along with the nomination of Seewoosagur Ramgoolam, André Nairac and A.M. Osman. Between 1950 and 1963 Dr Maurice Curé stood as an Independent against Labour Party candidates in a number of constituencies at both general and municipal elections; but he had limited success. In October 1964 he was finally nominated to the Council of Government.

== Pre-Independence 1967 General Elections & new party NSWP ==
At the August 1967 general elections he was an independent candidate of his newly formed party National Socialist Workers Party at new Constituency No.16 (Vacoas Floréal). But he was defeated as he collected only 158 votes (1.07%), well behind the 3 defeated anti-independence candidates of PMSD (Bussier, Narrainen & Maingard) and the 3 elected pro-independence IFB-PTr-CAM candidates (Chettiar, Awootar & Mason).

== Legacy ==
Dr Maurice Curé was the first activist to advocate the need to observe the First of May as Labour Day in Mauritius. On 1 May 1938 he organised a rally at the Champ de Mars which was attended by 35,000 workers. He reiterated the need for employers and authorities to implement recommendations of the Hooper Commission of Enquiry on the Gujadhur massacre (UBA riots), namely a reduction in working hours, increased salaries and the need to update the Constitution to allow all workers to vote in the country's elections. The size of the crowd confirmed Curé's growing influence and was a reminder of similar crowds which his predecessor and Creole leader Dr Eugène Laurent used to muster with and his party Action Libérale a few decades earlier. In May 1939 Curé attracted a similar crowd whom he addressed in Creole, reiterating the need to make the First of May a public holiday. But Sir Bede Clifford refused. After the landmark August 1948 elections Curé's successor Guy Rozemont, along with Sookdeo Bissoondoyal and Governor Sir Hilary Blood, finally succeeded at making changes that would make 1 May 1950 the first ever Labour Day public holiday in Mauritius.

== See also ==
- Dr. Maurice Curé State College
