= Coralia =

Coralia is a feminine given name. Notable people with the name include:

- Coralia Cartis, Romanian mathematician
- Coralia López (1910–1993), Cuban pianist, bandleader and composer
- Coralia Monterroso (born 1991), Guatemalan footballer
- Maruxa and Coralia Fandiño Ricart, Spanish sisters, popular figures in Santiago
