= 1948 Mauritian general election =

General elections were held in Mauritius in August 1948. They were the first elections under a new constitution, which established a Legislative Council with 19 elected members, 12 appointed members and 3 ex officio members, and expanded the franchise to all adults who could write their name in one of the island's languages. They were won by the Labour Party led by Guy Rozemont, with eleven of the 19 elected seats won by Hindus. However, the Governor Donald Mackenzie-Kennedy appointed twelve conservatives to the Council on 23 August, largely to ensure the dominance of English and French speakers.

The elections were also the first in which women stood as candidates. Emilienne Rochecouste, who ran as an independent, was elected in Plaines Wilhems–Black River, becoming the first Mauritian woman elected to the Legislative Council. Following the elections, Denise De Chazal was appointed as one of the twelve nominated members.

== Results ==
The elections were held over two days, with Port Louis and Plaines Wilhems-Rivière Noire voting on 9 August and the remainder voting on 10 August.

Constituency	Candidate	Votes	%	Notes
Port Louis	Guy Rozemont	7,257	16.4	Elected
Port Louis	Charles Edgard Millien	7,169	16.2	Elected
Port Louis	Renganaden Seeneevassen	5,257	11.9	Elected
Port Louis	Samuel Benjamin Emile	4,782	10.8	Elected
Port Louis	François Gabriel Martial	4,350	9.9	
Port Louis	Abdool Razack Mohamed	4,331	9.8	
Port Louis	Alphonse Gontrand Zamudio	3,275	7.4	
Port Louis	Cassam Mamode Nazroo	2,498	5.7	
Port Louis	Louis François Raynald Moutia	2,269	5.1	
Port Louis	Ajum Dahal	1,992	4.5	
Port Louis	Joseph Marcel Mason	516	1.2	
Port Louis	Louis Frank Noël Nellan	457	1.0	
Plaines Wilhems-Black River	Jules Marie Joseph Louis Maurice Jean Koenig	10,129	11.4	Elected
Plaines Wilhems-Black River	Louise Marie Emilienne Rochecouste	9,329	10.5	Elected
Plaines Wilhems-Black River	Peter Gérard Raymond Rault	8,195	9.3	Elected
Plaines Wilhems-Black River	Dunputh Luckeenarain	7,988	9.0	Elected
Plaines Wilhems-Black River	Joseph Guy Forget	7,436	8.4	Elected
Plaines Wilhems-Black River	Louis Raoul Rivet	7119	8.0	Elected
Plaines Wilhems-Black River	Paul Maurice Laurence Nairac	6,147	6.9	
Plaines Wilhems-Black River	Moonasur Kooraram	6,099	6.9	
Plaines Wilhems-Black River	Félix Conrad Laventure	5,681	6.4	
Plaines Wilhems-Black River	Jean Raoul Lamalétie	5,354	6.1	
Plaines Wilhems-Black River	Amédée Poupard	5,290	6.0	
Plaines Wilhems-Black River	Jacques Sizefroi Esaïe David	5,069	5.7	
Plaines Wilhems-Black River	Rechad Ben Noorooya	4,250	4.8	
Plaines Wilhems-Black River	Marie Eugène Grégoire	397	0.4	
Grand Port-Savanne	Sookdeo Bissoondoyal	5,612	18.7	Elected
Grand Port-Savanne	Jaynarain Roy	5,174	17.3	Elected
Grand Port-Savanne	Juggurnauth Bedaysee	4,707	15.7	Elected
Grand Port-Savanne	Charles Henri Raymond Hein	3,480	11.6	
Grand Port-Savanne	Marie Louis Philippe Rozemont	2,908	9.7	
Grand Port-Savanne	Wilfrid L'etang	2,757	9.2	
Grand Port-Savanne	Mamode Ismael Ghanty	2,629	8.8	
Grand Port-Savanne	Dayanandsing Ramdin	2,183	7.3	
Grand Port-Savanne	Louis Antoine Marcel Marrier D'Unienville	540	1.8	
Pamplemousses-Rivière du Rempart	Seewoosagur Ramgoolam	5,982	23.4	Elected
Pamplemousses-Rivière du Rempart	Harilall Ranchhordas Vaghjee	5,655	22.2	Elected
Pamplemousses-Rivière du Rempart	Aunauth Beejadhur	5,118	20.1	Elected
Pamplemousses-Rivière du Rempart	Jean Philippe Lagesse	2,846	11.2	
Pamplemousses-Rivière du Rempart	Radhamohun Gujadhur	2,082	8.2	
Pamplemousses-Rivière du Rempart	Donald Francis	1,370	5.4	
Pamplemousses-Rivière du Rempart	Ramawad Sewgobind	1,087	4.3	
Pamplemousses-Rivière du Rempart	Ramsoondar Baboolall	577	2.3	
Pamplemousses-Rivière du Rempart	Ramchundur Goburdhun	405	1.6	
Pamplemousses-Rivière du Rempart	Rampartab Allgoo	397	1.6	
Moka-Flacq	Sookdeosing Balgobin	4,737	18.2	Elected
Moka-Flacq	Bhagwan Gujadhur	4,602	17.7	Elected
Moka-Flacq	Ramsoomer Balgobin	4,544	17.5	Elected
Moka-Flacq	Alexis Désire Fernand Leclézio	4,472	17.2	
Moka-Flacq	Ackbar Gujadhur	3,139	12.1	
Moka-Flacq	Ismaël Peeroo	2,600	10.0	
Moka-Flacq	Satyadev Salabee	1,929	7.4	
Total		214,168	100	
Source: Electoral Commission
