= Renganaden Seeneevassen =

Mauritian politician

Renganaden Seeneevassen MP

Nominated member of Legislative Council
- In office 1944–1947

Elected member of Legislative Council
- In office 1948–1953

Minister of Education
- In office 1953–1958

Personal details
- Born: 11 April 1910 Port Louis, British Mauritius
- Died: 18 June 1958 (aged 48) Port Louis, British Mauritius
- Party: Labour Party (Mauritius)
- Education: London School of Economics
- Occupation: Lawyer

Renganaden Seeneevassen (11 April 1910 – 18 June 1958) was a Mauritian politician and government minister.

== Early life ==
Seeneevassen was born in Port Louis, Mauritius at a house located at the corner of Bourbon Street and Léoville L'Homme Street. Both his father and mother had migrated to Mauritius from India. In 1915 he attended the subsidised school L’église de l’Angleterre located at Rue Arsenal. Then he attended the Central Boys government school located at Rue La Paix, and the Sunnee Surtee school at Rémy Ollier Road. In 1921, Seeneevassen started his secondary education at Royal College Curepipe and 8 years later he completed his Higher School Certificate (HSC), coming out as the 4th best student in Mauritius in 1929.

Seeneevassen studied law at the London School of Economics (LSE). During his studies his instructor P.R. Larski introduced Seeneevassen to famous figures such as Mahatma Gandhi and Jawaharlal Nehru in 1935.

On 17 April 1940, he was called to the bar at the Middle Temple after graduating with a law degree. He soon returned to Mauritius where he practised law. He then worked as Liaison Officer at the Ministry of Health.

== Family life ==
Renganaden Seeneevassen was married to a native of Rodrigues Island and they raised their children in Port Louis. Their daughter Sarojini Seeneevassen is a marine biologist who joined the MMM and was Mauritian ambassador in Berlin until 2014.

== Political career ==
In the 1940s Seeneevassen joined the Labour Party. He was elected as councillor of Municipality of Port Louis, a role which he held until his death in 1958. In 1944 he was nominated as member of the Legislative Council by governor general Sir Donald Mackenzie Kennedy.

At the 1948 general elections Seeneevassen was elected to the Legislative Council. He was elected again at the 1953 general elections. In 1953 Guy Sauzier selected Seeneevassen to represent Mauritius at the coronation ceremony of Queen Elizabeth in England.

In 1957 he was appointed as Minister of Education. In 1958 he travelled to Burma to negotiate the price of bulk orders of rice on behalf of the Government of Mauritius. He died soon after his return to Mauritius at Labourdonnais Street and was cremated at Vallée des Prêtres.

== Recognition ==
The secondary school Renganaden Seeneevassen SSS is named after him. In the capital city of Port Louis a street which connects Abattoir Road to Royal Road also bears his name. There is also a building which is named after Seeneevassen at the corner of Pope Hennessy and Mallard streets in Port Louis. The 100 rupee note bears his name and picture in his honor.
