= Jan Andolan =

Political movement in British Mauritius

- Founded: 1939
- Ideology: Hindutva
- Political position: Centre-left to left-wing
- Colours: Orange

Election symbol
- Wheel

The Jan Andolan was a political movement in British Mauritius. It was the predecessor of the Independent Forward Bloc (IFB).

== History ==
In 1939 the Jan Andolan was founded by activist Basdeo Bissoondoyal soon after his return from tertiary studies in India, at the start of World War II. The term Jan Andolan literally means movement of the people. By forming the Jan Andolan, Bissoondoyal intended to uplift the mass of Indo-Mauritian population who lacked political and cultural leadership on the British colony of Mauritius.

== Legacy ==
The Maha Yaj, which was organised by Jan Andolan and took place in at Rue du Pouce in Port-Louis, was attended by 60,000 individuals of several ethnic origins and religions. Basdeo Bissoondoyal later observed that this event was a landmark in the history of the revival of Hinduism in Mauritius.

The Jan Andolan also organised celebrations in Port Louis to mark the independence of India and Pakistan in August 1947.

Ahead of the August 1948 General Elections the Jan Andolan also led a nationwide literacy campaign to enable the mass of mainly illiterate Indo-Mauritians to cast their votes for the first time in island's history. Bissondoyal's movement achieved this as volunteers educated Indo-Mauritians how to sign their names in Hindi, in order to pass a simple literacy test to qualify as a voter according to the revised Constitution of 1947. In the years leading up to the new Constitution there had been several discussions in the Consultative Committee in 1945 on the proposals for a new constitution, especially about the mandatory literacy test to qualify as electors. After serving a 3rd term of imprisonment, Basdeo Bissoondoyal launched an appeal in Camp Fouquereaux on 14 January 1946, calling for the immediate opening of 300 Hindi evening schools under trees and under the verandas of shops, acting as baitkas. He also enlisted the help of volunteers to teach basic reading and writing skills to Indo-Mauritians who resided mostly in villages.

Jan Andolan published a newspaper called Zamana to propagate the movement's message in Mauritius. Contributors included Malcolm de Chazal who also regularly discussed philosophy, metaphysics and literature with Basdeo Bissoondoyal.
