= 1850 Yamsé Ghoon Riots =

Violent clashes in Mauritius between 1800–1900

- Date: November 1850
- Location: Port Louis, Mauritius
- Caused by: Ethnic tensions between Muslims and Creoles in Mauritius; Political rivalries
- Methods: rioting, assault, destruction of property

The 1850 Yamsé Ghoon Riots refer to violent clashes which erupted in Port Louis, the capital of British Mauritius in November 1850.

== Clash of ethnic groups ==
Muslims of Indian ancestry were commemorating the Mourning of Muharram in the form of an annual procession in the suburb of Port Louis which was known as Camp Des Malabars (or Plaine Verte nowadays). The event was also known as Yamsé or Ghoon. However they were attacked by former slaves of Creole origins, also known as ex-apprentices. The Muslims were forced to abandon their Ghoon structures or tazias as they were chased around the streets in broad daylight by the Creole assailants.

== Aftermath of riots ==
Several fatalities were reported. However the inaction of the Chief of Police Charles Anderson was criticised.
