= Ralliement Mauricien =

Political party in Mauritius

- Founded: 1953
- Succeeded by: PMSD
- Ideology: Capitalism

The Ralliement Mauricien was a political party in Mauritius.

== History ==
The Ralliement Mauricien(RM) party was founded by Jules Koenig in 1953 ahead of the 1953 General Elections for the Legislative Council.

It had previously been known as Union Mauricienne which had participated in previous elections.

After the 1953 elections Jules Koenig changed the name of his party from Ralliement Mauricien to Parti Mauricien. Soon after Gaëtan Duval's succession to Jules Koenig in 1965 he re-branded the same party to Parti Mauricien Social Démocrate (PMSD).
