= Mauritian Creoles =

Ethnic classification of Mauritians with African descent

Regions with significant populations
- Mauritius, Australia, France, United Kingdom

Languages
- Mauritian Creole, French

Religion
- Christianity, Rastafari, African Folk Religion, Irreligion

Mauritian Creoles are the people on the islands of Mauritius, Rodrigues, Agaléga and the Chagos Archipelago and in the wider overseas Mauritian diaspora who trace their roots to continental Africans who were brought to Mauritius under slavery from the seventeenth to the nineteenth century. The majority of these enslaved people came from the region in and around modern day Mozambique and Madagascar (with significant minorities from other parts of Africa and even some from Asia). Creole peoples (a grouping which Mauritian Creoles are a part of) can be found on other islands in the Mascarene Islands (including Reunion island and the Seychelles) and these groups all share cultural and linguistic connections with one another stemming from the common heritage of their African ancestors. It can also refer to and include Christian members of the country's mixed race community. In government records, creoles along with Franco-Mauritians form part of the broader group known as Population Générale.

== Origins ==
The African ancestors of this community were captured by slave traders and brought in as part of the original failed attempts of the Dutch to colonise Mauritius, Agaléga, Rodrigues and the Chagos Islands. Later slaves were brought in by the French to work on plantations. They were Bantus mostly brought from East Africa (notably Mozambique) and Madagascar. The Creole population also encompasses those who are a product of the admixture of African and non-African communities and who retained or adopted Christianity. Genetic analysis has confirmed significant Austronesian ancestry via the Malagasy roots

Nowadays, a significant proportion of Mauritian Creoles have African ancestry with varying amounts of French and Indian ancestry. Rodriguais, Agaléans and Chagossians are usually incorporated within this ethnic group.

Mauritian Creoles make up around 27% of the population of Mauritius. There is also significant representation of Mauritian Creoles within the overseas Mauritian diaspora.

== Definition of "Mauritian Creole" ==
Although the Mauritian Creole community is a well recognised community of Mauritius at the societal level, the definition of 'Creole' (both in the Mauritian context and more generally) is not fixed or universally agreed. Individual identification as a 'Mauritian Creole' is generally based on person's choice to identify and belong to the community or recognition of their origins as being 'creole'. Family origins and traditions are also important aspects of the Mauritian Creole identity (so Creole identifying people also tend to identify their families or a part of their family as being Creole in origins).

== Cultural contributions ==
Mauritian Creoles have retained elements of Afro-Malagasy cultural practices in areas such as music, dress, cuisine, spirituality and religion which point to their roots among those peoples. These practises have been incorporated into the general diversity of Mauritian culture along with other influences.

One key example of such a cultural contribution is the development of the islands iconic Sega dance and music genre. Sega dance and music are cultural artifacts shared within the broader community of 'Creoles' in the Mascarene islands. The instruments used in the performance of the traditional sega form (called Sega typic) also have African roots. The Maravanne is one example of a Mauritian instrument used in Sega typic which has an equivalent in the African instrument called the Kayamb.

The French based local language known as Mauritian Creole is also the most commonly used local language in Mauritius and is unique to the island, having evolved from its development and use in the creole community of Mauritius at the time of slavery and prior to the arrival of indentured labourers from India. Other communities adopted the use of Mauritian Creole and it is now the lingua franca of Mauritius.

The Mauritian Creole language is very similar to other French Creole or Kreol languages in the Mascarene islands such as Reunion Creole and Seychellois Creole. These creoles languages are mutually intelligible and speakers are able to cross islands and speak with little difficulty.

== Community discrimination ==
Mauritian Creoles have faced racial discrimination on account of their real or perceived African heritage and features. Mauritian Creoles are a minority that is sometimes subject to colour discrimination. Poverty, unequal access to resources and opportunities and issues of lack of representation in the political institutions also have historically affected this community to a greater extent than other communities of Mauritians.

== See also ==
- Dougla people
- Coloureds
- Mulatto
- Mauritian Creole
- Mauritian of Chinese origin
- Franco Mauritians
- Mauritians of Indian origin
