= Abdool Wahab Foondun =

Mauritian politician (1908-1977)

Abdool Wahab Foondun MP

MP
- In office 1959–1963
- Prime Minister: Seewoosagur Ramgoolam

MP
- In office 1963–1967
- Prime Minister: Seewoosagur Ramgoolam

Personal details
- Born: British Mauritius
- Party: Independent Forward Bloc (IFB)
- Children: Ahad Foondun
- Occupation: Teacher

Abdool Wahab Foondun was a Mauritian politician who was active both before and after the Independence of Mauritius.

== Political career ==
Foondun collaborated with Basdeo Bissoondoyal in Jan Andolan's campaign leading to the 1948 elections by promoting the study of Urdu by Mauritian Muslims. This was the first time in Mauritian history that the mass of Indo-Mauritians was allowed to vote for their representatives at the Legislative Council under the revised Constitution, as long as they could write their names in English, French or an oriental language.

At the 1959 general elections the island was divided in 40 constituencies, compared to the 5 districts during the previous 1948 and 1953 elections, and 5 muslim candidates (A.G. Issac, S.Y. Ramjan, A.R. Mohamed, A. Dahal and A.H. Osman) were elected to the Legislative Council. Four years after 1959, at the 1963 general elections Abdool Wahab Foondun, the candidate of Sookdeo Bissoondoyal's Independent Forward Bloc (IFB), was one of five Indo-Mauritian Muslims who were elected, the other 4 Muslims being Haroon Aubdool, Razack Mohamed, Yousouf Ramjan and Osman. Foondun's victory in the Hindu-majority constituency of Bon-Accueil was even more surprising as he defeated Labour Party's candidate Rabindrah Ghurburrun. At the 1965 Constitutional Conference held in London Abdool Wahab Foondun's election in a predominantly Hindu constituency was paramount to prevent the imposition of divisive separate communal electoral rolls in Mauritius.

At the 1967 general elections the number of constituencies was halved to only 20 and Abdool Wahab Foondun, candidate of the IFB within the Independence Party (IFB-Labour-CAM alliance), was one of the 10 Indo-Mauritian Muslims to be elected to the Legislative Council. He came out third behind Satcam Boolell and Kher Jagatsingh in Constituency No. 10 - Montagne Blanche and Grand River South East.

Nine years after his electoral victory Abdool Wahab Foondun of the IFB was defeated at the 1976 general elections by a new generation of activists of the newly formed MMM, he secured only 168 votes (1.087% of votes) and came out in 13th position in Constituency No. 2 - Port Louis South and Port Louis Central. In this constituency Kader Bhayat, Noel Lee Cheong Lem and Rajiv Servansingh were elected to the Legislative Assembly after securing over 42% of votes each. His brother Abdool Raschid Foondun, a candidate of the defunct Mauritius Muslim Democratic League in Constituency No. 3, was also defeated by the MMM and secured only 0.69% of votes.
