= Kher Jagatsingh =

Mauritian politician

Sir Keharsingh Jagatsingh Kt, MP

Minister of Education
- In office 1977–1982

Minister of Planning & Economic Development
- In office 1967–1975

Member of Parliament
- In office 1959–1963

Personal details
- Born: 23 July 1931 Punjab, British India
- Died: 19 July 1985 (aged 53) England
- Party: Mauritian Labour Party
- Occupation: Journalist

Keharsingh Jagatsingh, more commonly known as Sir Kher Jagatsingh (23 July 1931 – 19 July 1985) was a Mauritian politician and Labour Party (Mauritius) minister.

== Early life ==
Keharsingh was born in Punjab, India, the 14th child of a family of 16 children. His family was of Indian origin belonging to the Punjabi Sikh descent who later migrated to Mauritius and his father was a prison warden at Beau Bassin who retired in 1940. Although he did not attend secondary school, Keharsingh joined the Teachers Training College in 1950, but left for the Civil Service where he worked as a clerk in the Ministry of Health before starting a newspaper.

== Political career ==
As a young journalist of Mauritius Times Jagatsingh was mentored by social worker Bikramsingh Ramlallah who was also later elected to parliament in 1959. At the 1959 elections Jagatsingh was elected in Constituency No.40 Petite Rivière. Labourite Guy Forget (Mauritius) encouraged Jagatsingh to join politics. However at the October 1963 general elections Jagatsingh was not elected to Legislative Council as he was defeated by his rival Noutun Parsad Puduruth at Constituency No.40 Petite Rivière. At the General Elections held on 7 August 1967 Kher Jagatsingh was elected to Parliament in Constituency No.10 Montagne Blanche-Grand Rivière Sud Est (GRSE). In 1967 he campaigned under the banner of the Independence Party(coalition of IFB-Labour-CAM) with his running mates Satcam Boolell and Abdool Wahab Foondun within Constituency No.10. He became Minister of Planning & Economic Development until 1976. He was not elected at the 1976 General Elections although his running mate Satcam Boolell and rivals Ramduth Jadoo and Jagdish Goburdhun were elected in Constituency No.10. But in 1977 he became Member of Parliament without any elections following the resignation of Heeralall Bhugaloo, the Minister of Education under the Labour government.

From 1977 to 1982 Jagatsingh was Minister of Education and during his term in office major reforms to the educational sector occurred. Such reforms followed Sir Seewoosagur Ramgoolam's electoral promises in response to the major disturbance caused by the 1975 Mauritian student protests. As a result, school fees were abolished for all secondary schools and the quality of education was improved. However following the electoral defeat at the 1982 General Elections Sir Kher Jagatsingh retired from politics. He died on 19 July 1985 in England.

== Publications ==
In 1954 Kher Jagatsingh was a co-founder of the weekly newspaper Mauritius Times. Jagatsingh wrote a book titled "Petals of dust" which was published in Mauritius in 1981.

== Recognition ==
Kher Jagatsingh was knighted in December 1980. Other Mauritians who received the same title in 1980 were Gaetan Duval and Rabindranath Ghurburrun. In 1967 the Sir Kher Jagatsing Training Centre (SKJTC) was established in the town of Beau Bassin. The technical institution offers training programmes to develop skilled tradesmen for the construction sector such as electricians, plumbers, welders, masons, scaffolders and wood workers.
