= Leader of the Opposition (Mauritius) =

Leader of the Opposition of Mauritius
- Leader de l'opposition
- Coat of arms of Mauritius

- Incumbent; Chetan Baboolall since 6 August 2026
- Style: The Honourable
- Reports to: President of Mauritius
- Appointer: President of Mauritius
- Term length: While leader of the largest political party in the National Assembly that is not in government
- Inaugural holder: Sir Gaëtan Duval
- Formation: 12 March 1968; 58 years ago
- Salary: ₨ 1,900,000

The leader of the opposition (French: Leader de l'opposition) of the Republic of Mauritius is the Member of Parliament who leads the Official Opposition in Mauritius. The leader of the opposition is the leader of the largest political party in the National Assembly that is not in government.

This office is a constitutional one guaranteed by the laws of the country. The incumbent officeholder automatically becomes 7th in the order of precedence. The current leader of the opposition is Chetan Baboolall, who was appointed on 6 August 2026.

== Overview ==
The political party or party alliance which wins the majority of seats in Parliament forms the government and its leader usually becomes the prime minister. The prime minister selects the members of the composition of the Cabinet from elected members of the Assembly, except for the attorney general who may not be an elected member of the Assembly. The political party or alliance which has the second-largest majority forms the Official Opposition and its leader is normally nominated by the president of the Republic as the leader of the opposition.

According to Section 73 of the Constitution of Mauritius, there shall be a leader of the opposition who shall be appointed by the president, where the president has occasion to appoint a leader of the opposition, he shall in his own deliberate judgment appoint –

(a) where there is one opposition party whose numerical strength in the Assembly is greater than the strength of any other opposition party, the member of the Assembly who is the leader in the Assembly of that party; or

(b) where there is no such party, the member of the Assembly whose appointment would, in the judgment of the president, be most acceptable to the leaders in the Assembly of the opposition parties:

Provided that, where occasion arises for making an appointment while Parliament is dissolved, a person who was a member of the Assembly immediately before the dissolution may be appointed leader of the opposition.

== List of leaders of the opposition ==
No.	Portrait	Name (Birth–Death)	Election	Tenure		Party
No.	Portrait	Name (Birth–Death)	Election	Took office	Left office	Party
1		Gaëtan Duval (1930–1996)	1967	7 August 1967	1 December 1969	PMSD
2		Maurice Lesage (1923–1992)	1967	1 December 1969	October; 1973	UDM
3		Sookdeo Bissoondoyal (1907–1977)	1967	23 October 1973	23 December 1976	IFB
4		Anerood Jugnauth (1930–2021)	1976	23 December 1976	11 June 1982	MMM
(1)		Sir Gaëtan Duval (1930–1996)	1982	11 June 1982	21 August 1983	PMSD
5		Paul Bérenger (born 1945)	1983	21 August 1983	15 September 1987	MMM
6		Prem Nababsing (1940–2017)	1987	15 September 1987	18 August 1990	MMM
7		Sir Satcam Boolell (1920–2006)	1987	18 August 1990	15 September 1991	PTr
8		Navin Ramgoolam (born 1947)	1991	15 September 1991	20 December 1995	PTr
(1)		Sir Gaëtan Duval (1930–1996)	1995	20 December 1995	5 May 1996	PMSD
9		Nicolas Von Mally	1995	18 May 1996	5 July 1997	MR
(5)		Paul Bérenger (born 1945)	1995	5 July 1997	11 September 2000	MMM
(8)		Navin Ramgoolam (born 1947)	2000	11 September 2000	5 July 2005	PTr
(5)		Paul Bérenger (born 1945)	2005	5 July 2005	4 April 2006	MMM
10		Nando Bodha (born 1954)	2005	4 April 2006	24 September 2007	MSM
(5)		Paul Bérenger (born 1945)	2010	25 September 2007	28 January 2013	MMM
11		Alan Ganoo (born 1951)	2010	28 January 2013	1 October 2013	MMM
(5)		Paul Bérenger (born 1945)	2010	1 October 2013	15 September 2014	MMM
12		Pravind Jugnauth (born 1961)	2010	15 September 2014	13 December 2014	MSM
(5)		Paul Bérenger (born 1945)	2014	22 December 2014	20 December 2016	MMM
13		Xavier-Luc Duval (born 1958)	2014	20 December 2016	14 November 2019	PMSD
14		Arvin Boolell (born 1953)	2019	14 November 2019	1 March 2021	PTr
(13)		Xavier-Luc Duval (born 1958)	2019	4 March 2021	15 April 2024	PMSD
15		Shakeel Mohamed (born 1968)	2019	15 April 2024	3 June 2024	PTr
(14)		Arvin Boolell (born 1953)	2019	3 June 2024	12 November 2024	PTr
16		Joe Lesjongard	2024	15 November 2024	6 August 2026	MSM
17		Chetan Baboolall	2024	6 August 2026	Incumbent	FMP

== See also ==
- Prime Minister of Mauritius
- Deputy Prime Minister of Mauritius
- Vice-Prime Minister of Mauritius
- Government of Mauritius
