= All Mauritius Hindu Congress =

Political party in Mauritius

- Founded: 1964
- Dissolved: 1967
- Merged into: Mauritian Militant Movement
- Newspaper: Congress
- Ideology: Socialism; Hindu interests

The All Mauritius Hindu Congress (AMHC) was a political party in Mauritius which existed from 1964 to 1967.

== History ==
The All Mauritius Hindu Congress (AMHC) was inspired by the Arya Samaj movement and was created to uplift the lives of Hindus in all fields in defiance of the caste system. As a result orthodox Hindus, who were in favour of casteism, banded in organisations such as the Brahmin Sabha and Kshatriya Sabha, even culminating in a Supreme Court trial over a caste dispute. However the AMHC's focus changed due to the rising anti-Hindu communalism as the British colonisers prepared to leave Mauritius in the 1960s, prompting the PMSD to wage an anti-independence and anti-Hindu propaganda and violence campaign against the Hindus who form the majority ethnic community on the island. Notable members of the AMHC were Hurreelall Padaruth, Anerood Jugnauth, Lall Jugnauth, Rabindrah Ghurburrun, Beergoonath Ghurburrun, Premchand Dabee, and Devendra Varma who joined AMHC in the years prior to the August 1967 elections in preparation for Independence from the United Kingdom. Its electoral symbol was a wheel, inspired by the Ashoka Chakra.

As a prominent member of IFB and of the new AMHC Anerood Jugnauth took part in the London Constitutional Conference on Mauritius, also commonly known as the 1965 Lancaster Conference. Earlier in 1963 Anerood Jugnauth had been elected for the first time to the Legislative Council as an IFB candidate.

== Newspaper ==
The All Mauritius Hindu Congress published a Hindi newspaper called Congress starting from 19 November 1964 to promote not only its political message but also published literary articles. Premchand Dabee was its editor for the English section whilst Pandit Soondar-Parsad Sharma was the editor for the Hindi section. Publication stopped after the 1967 elections.

== 1967 Elections ==
Although it was pro-Independence the AMHC suffered a significant defeat at the August 1967 elections as none of its candidates was elected. AMHC obtained only 0.8% of votes, whilst its rival Independence Party (Mauritius) won the majority (55%) of votes and the PMSD was second best with 44% of votes. Prior to the elections the AMHC was excluded from the coalition of Parti de l'Indépendance (IFB-CAM-Labour) due to its extreme radicalism. Soon afterwards the party was dissolved. A few months before the 1967 elections Anerood Jugnauth had already taken up a position in the civil service as a magistrate and thus he did not participate in these elections.
