= Hervé Duval =

Mauritian politician (1932–2004)

Joseph Hervé Duval GOSK

Leader of the PMSD
- Incumbent
- Assumed office 1996-2004

Minister of Industry
- In office 1987–1988

Minister of Labour and Industrial Relations
- In office 1983–1987

Councillor at Municipality of Beau Bassin - Rose Hill
- In office 1983–1988

Permanent Secretary
- In office 1954–1982

Personal details
- Born: 8 March 1932 Rose Hill, British Mauritius
- Died: 12 October 2004 (aged 72) Mauritius
- Party: PMSD; Parti Gaëtan Duval (PGD)
- Relations: Gaëtan Duval (brother)
- Children: 1 son (Hervé Duval Jr) and 3 daughters
- Education: Royal College of Curepipe

Joseph Hervé Duval (8 March 1932 – 12 October 2004), most commonly known as Hervé Duval or Vévé, was a Mauritian senior civil servant and trade-unionist who later became a politician.

== Early life and education ==
Duval was born in Rose Hill on 8 March 1932 in an upper middle-class Creole family of mixed ancestry. His father Charles was a civil servant and his mother Rosina Henrisson (1902-1989) was a housewife. In 1933, when Hervé was barely 8 months of age, his father died, forcing him, his mother and elder brother Gaëtan into poverty. Despite these hard times, Hervé followed the footsteps of his brother Gaëtan by attending Saint-Enfant-Jésus RCA primary school and then the Royal College of Curepipe. In the early 1950s he worked as a secondary school teacher at Collège du Saint-Esprit where he worked alongside Guy Ollivry, who later studied to become a lawyer and founder of Union Démocratique Mauricienne. Hervé Duval then took up employment in the civil service where he worked for 28 years. During that time he also served as a trade-unionist for the Federation of Civil Service and Other Unions (FCSOU), and also organised the first ever strikes of civil servants.

== Political career ==
Following the electoral victory of the MMM-PSM coalition in 1982, Hervé Duval's employment in the Civil Service as Permanent Secretary in the Ministry of Foreign Affairs and Tourism, was abruptly terminated. The MMM-PSM government led by Harish Boodhoo, Anerood Jugnauth and Paul Bérenger amended Section 113 of the Constitution, making senior civil servants' vulnerable and subservient to the ruling political force. As a result, a witch-hunt ensued during which Hervé Duval, Kanti Banymandhub, D. Purmessur, solicitor-general Edwin Venchard, Jean Delaître (MBC), Pynee Padayachy, and B. Ghoorah were among those who lost their job in the civil service as they were perceived to be too close to the previous regime of Labour-PMSD. Hervé Duval then joined his brother's political party, the PMSD and was elected in May 1983 as a candidate in the municipal by-elections in Beau Bassin-Rose Hill, defeating his main rival Gérard Ahnee of the MMM.

At the Legislative Assembly Elections held on 21 August 1983, Hervé Duval was elected in Constituency No. 20 Beau Bassin-Petite Rivière as a candidate of the MSM-PTr-PMSD coalition, in second position after Jean Régis Finette of the MMM. He became Minister of Labour and Industrial Relations before becoming the Minister of Housing.

Hervé Duval was a candidate of the PMSD at the Legislative Assembly Elections held on 30 August 1987 and was elected in Constituency No.17 Curepipe-Midlands. He became the Minister of Industry but soon resigned in 1988 when the PMSD left the government. Soon afterwards he took on the role of chief editor of the weekly newspaper Le Rassembleur at a critical time when his elder brother Gaëtan went under trial for the 1971 murder of MMM activist Azor Adelaide.

At the Legislative Assembly Elections held on 15 September 1991, Hervé Duval stood as a candidate of the PTr-PMSD coalition in Constituency No. 12 (Mahébourg-Plaine Magnien) but he was not elected.

Hervé Duval was a candidate of the Parti Gaetan Duval in Constituency No. 20 (Beau Bassin and Petite Rivière) at the National Assembly Elections held on 20 December 1995, but he was not elected, defeated by Joceline Minerve, Rajesh Bhagwan and Monique Ohsan-Bellepeau of the PTr-MMM coalition.

At the time of Gaëtan Duval's death in May 1996 the internal strifes within the PMSD continued and had prompted Gaëtan Duval to form the new party Parti Gaëtan Duval. However, soon after Gaëtan's death, Hervé returned to the PMSD and became the party's new leader. On 10 September 1997, the politburo of the PMSD, led by Hervé Duval, gathered at Maurice Allet's home and expelled Xavier-Luc Duval by a majority vote for indiscipline and following his personal attacks against the party's leadership. Xavier Duval was against the new coalition formed by PMSD with its historical rival, the MMM. By the year 2000 he aligned the PMSD toward the MSM-MMM coalition, and became the PMSD's honorary president until his death in October 2004.

== Recognition ==
- Mauritius:
  - Grand Officer of the Order of the Star and Key of the Indian Ocean (2003)
