= Anerood Jugnauth =

Mauritian statesman (1930–2021)

The Right Honourable Sir Anerood Jugnauth GCSK KCMG PC QC
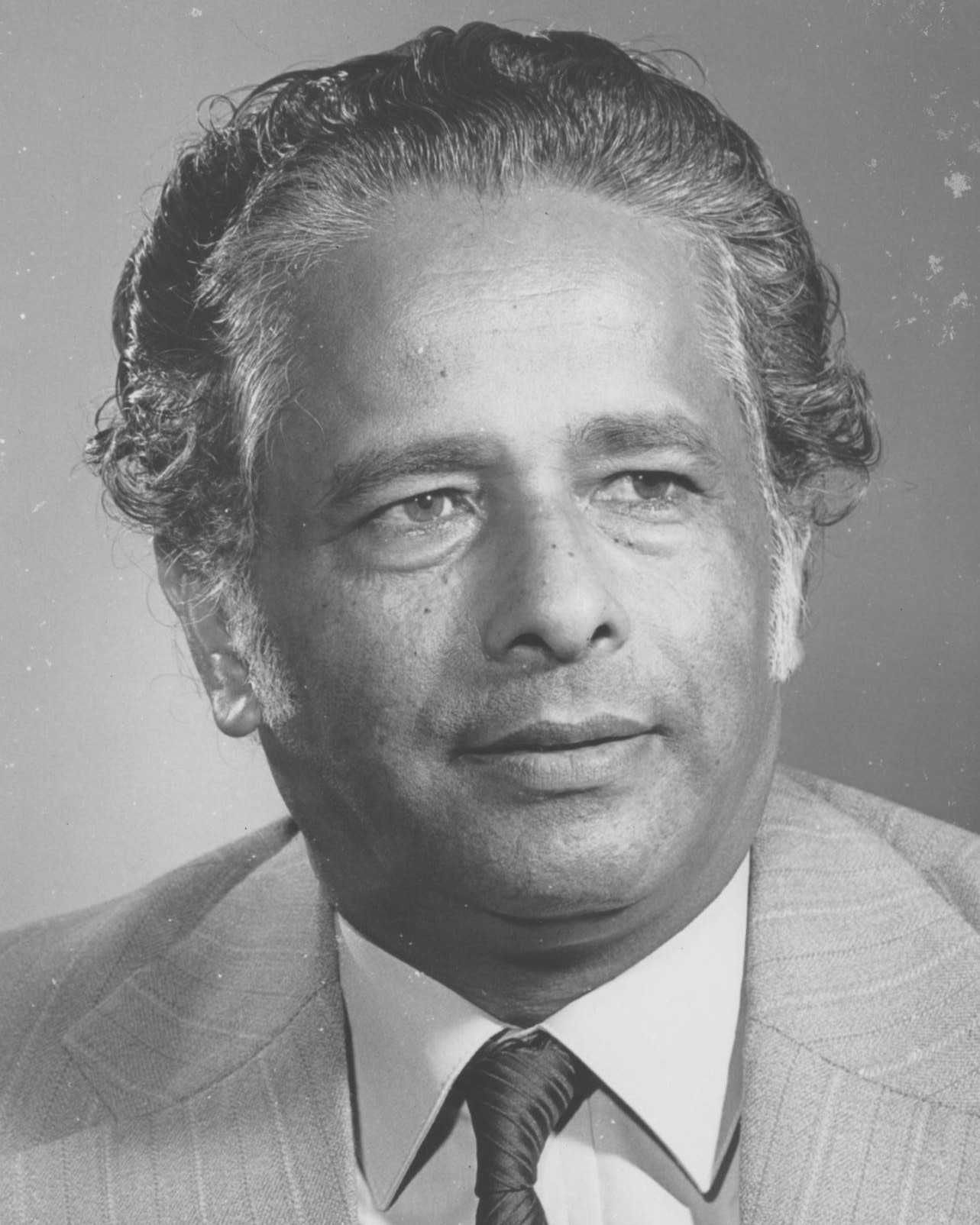
- Jugnauth, c. 1980s

President of Mauritius
- In office 7 October 2003 – 31 March 2012
- Prime Minister: Paul Bérenger; Navin Ramgoolam
- Vice President: Raouf Bundhun; Angidi Chettiar; Monique Ohsan Bellepeau
- Preceded by: Karl Offmann
- Succeeded by: Monique Ohsan Bellepeau (acting)

Prime Minister of Mauritius
- In office 13 December 2014 – 23 January 2017
- President: Kailash Purryag; Ameenah Gurib-Fakim
- Deputy: Xavier-Luc Duval; Ivan Collendavelloo
- Preceded by: Navin Ramgoolam
- Succeeded by: Pravind Jugnauth
- In office 16 September 2000 – 30 September 2003
- President: Cassam Uteem; Angidi Chettiar (acting); Ariranga Pillay (acting); Karl Offmann
- Deputy: Paul Bérenger
- Preceded by: Navin Ramgoolam
- Succeeded by: Paul Bérenger
- In office 15 June 1982 – 27 December 1995
- Monarch: Elizabeth II (1982–1992)
- President: Veerasamy Ringadoo; Cassam Uteem
- Governors General: Dayendranath Burrenchobay; Seewoosagur Ramgoolam; Veerasamy Ringadoo
- Deputy: Harish Boodhoo; Gaëtan Duval; Satcam Boolell; Prem Nababsing
- Preceded by: Seewoosagur Ramgoolam
- Succeeded by: Navin Ramgoolam
Senior political offices
Leader of the Opposition
In office 23 December 1976 – 11 June 1982
Prime Minister	Seewoosagur Ramgoolam
Preceded by	Sookdeo Bissoondoyal
Succeeded by	Gaëtan Duval
Leader of the Militant Socialist Movement
In office 8 April 1983 – 30 October 2003
Preceded by	Position established
Succeeded by	Pravind Jugnauth
Parliamentary offices
Member of Parliament; for Piton and Rivière du Rempart
In office 11 December 2014 – 7 November 2019
Preceded by	Prathiba Bolah
Succeeded by	Maneesh Gobin
In office 11 September 2000 – 7 September 2003
Preceded by	Dev Virahsawmy
Succeeded by	Rajesh Jeetah
In office 20 December 1976 – 20 December 1995
Preceded by	Hurry Ramnarain
Succeeded by	Dev Virahsawmy
In office 21 October 1963 – 7 August 1967
Preceded by	Constituency established
Succeeded by	Hurry Ramnarain

Personal details
- Born: 29 March 1930 Palma, British Mauritius
- Died: 3 June 2021 (aged 91) Floréal, Mauritius
- Party: Independent Forward Bloc (before 1965); All Mauritius Hindu Congress (1965–1967); Mauritian Militant Movement (1969–1982); Militant Socialist Movement (1982–2003; 2012–2021)
- Other political affiliations: Independent (2003–2012; 1967–1969)
- Spouse: Sarojini Ballah (m. 1956)
- Children: 2, including Pravind
- Parents: Ramlochun Jugnauth (father); Soomeetra Ramnath (mother)
- Education: Inns of Court School of Law

Sir Anerood Jugnauth GCSK KCMG PC QC (29 March 1930 – 3 June 2021) was a Mauritian statesman, barrister, and politician. He served six terms as Prime Minister, two terms as President and one term as Leader of Opposition. Often called the father of the Mauritian economic miracle, he led Mauritius through unprecedented economic growth and modernization as both Prime Minister and President.

He diversified the economy beyond sugarcane into tourism, textiles, offshore services, IT, and knowledge sectors, while modernizing infrastructure like airports, ports, and roads.

Under his leadership, Mauritius became a republic on 12 March 1992, improved living standards, expanded social welfare, and secured UNESCO World Heritage Sites. He also championed Mauritius’s sovereignty over the Chagos Archipelago internationally, leaving a legacy of economic prosperity and political stability for the country.

== Early life ==
Jugnauth was born in Palma, Mauritius in a Bhojpuri speaking Hindu Indo-Mauritian family belonging to the Ahir broader Yadav community and was brought up there. His grandfather had migrated to Mauritius from the Ballia District of Indian state of Uttar Pradesh in the 1870s. His father was Ramlochun Jugnauth and his mother was Soomeetra Ramnath. His parents separated when he was a child and he was brought up by his father, step-mother and elder cousin Lall Jugnauth. He had his primary education at Palma Primary School and his secondary education at Regent College. He taught for some time at New Eton College and later worked as a clerk in the Poor Law Department for some time before being transferred to the Judicial Department. In 1951, he left Mauritius for the UK to study law at the Lincoln's Inn, and became a lawyer in 1954.

== Political career ==
=== Early beginnings: 1957–1976 ===
In 1957, Jugnauth was elected President of Palma Village Council. Whilst serving as an IFB member of Legislative Council he was also elected as member of the Municipal Council of Vacoas-Phoenix.

Jugnauth was elected for the first time to the Legislative Council in Constituency No. 14 of Riviere du Rempart at a time when there were 40 Constituencies in the island in October 1963 and was candidate of the Independent Forward Bloc (IFB).

In 1964, he was one of the founders of All Mauritius Hindu Congress but continued to serve in Sir Seewoosagur Ramgoolam's government as State Minister for Development from 1965 to 1966. He was then promoted to Minister of Labour in November 1966. Jugnauth was part of the Mauritian delegation representing the Independent Forward Bloc at the 1965 Lancaster House Conference where the independence of Mauritius was decided.

He resigned from office in April 1967, joined the Civil Service as Magistrate, and did not take part in the August 1967 General Elections.

In 1970 he joined the MMM and became the party's president. and led the party in its first electoral campaign, being presented as its prime minister candidate in 1976.

=== In opposition: 1976–1982 ===
The main contenders of the 1976 elections were the Independence Party (alliance of Mauritian Labor Party and the CAM), PMSD, UDM, IFB and the relatively new MMM led by Paul Bérenger and Jugnauth himself.

Despite receiving most of the votes (38.64%) the MMM only secured 34 seats, two short of an absolute majority. The Independence Party scored 37.90% of votes and 28 seats, whilst the PMSD received 16.20% of the votes and 8 seats.

By re-establishing its former alliance, which it had since 1969 with the PMSD, Ramgoolam managed to stay in power. The Labour-PMSD-CAM alliance occupied 36 seats with a weak majority of only 2 seats, despite CAM's leader Sir Abdool Razack Mohamed's failure to be re-elected. Jugnauth became Leader of the Opposition until 1982 when his alliance won all the seats in the assembly.

=== Premiership: 1982–1995 ===
From 1976 to 1982, the MLP had been weakened by the defection of part of its coalition partner, the PMSD, while the CAM declined to contest the election. The MMM had formed an alliance with Harish Boodhoo's Parti Socialiste Mauricien known as PSM.

The election resulted in a landslide victory for the MMM-PSM alliance (formed by Jugnauth and Berenger in early 1981), which won 64.16% of the vote and all 60 elected seats (42 by the MMM, 18 by the PSM, and two for the allied Organisation du Peuple Rodriguais) (for more detail see 1982 Legislative Assembly election results). Voter turn-out was 87.3%, with 471,196 out of an electorate of 540,000 casting their votes for the 34 parties contesting 62 seats. The LP, which had dominated Mauritian politics since 1948, won no seats and (together with the Muslim Action Committee) only 25.78% of the vote. The PMSD did even worse, receiving only 7.79% of the vote. The LP and the PMSD each did eventually receive two seats in parliament under the best-loser provisions.

Jugnauth became Prime Minister of Mauritius for the first time, Boodhoo Deputy Prime Minister, and Paul Bérenger Minister of Finance. Jugnauth being prime minister announced general elections in 1983 again. This time he was not a candidate for the MMM but he proposed to Boodhoo dissolving the PSM to make a new stronger Party called the MSM (Militant Socialist Movement). He created the MSM and in Alliance with the Mauritian Labour Party went to the general elections together trying to fight against Berenger and his MMM. In March 1983, the government collapsed when the dominant faction within the MMM [Mouvement Militant Mauricien], led by Bérenger, split from Jugnauth's leadership and resigned from the cabinet.

In early April 1983, Jugnauth formed a new party, the Mouvement Socialiste Militant (MSM), which, in May, amalgamated with the PSM led by Harish Boodhoo. However, the new government lacked a majority in the legislative assembly, and Jugnauth dissolved the National assembly in June. New elections were held on 23 August 1983. Jugnauth was re-elected and returned as prime minister of the MSM-PMSD-Labour alliance, defeating the MMM.

The MMM received 209,845 votes (46.4%) – the highest proportion of the vote ever received by a single party in any Mauritian election. The Alliance received 236,146 votes (52.22%); independents and the Rodrigues parties got the remaining 1.38% and two seats. Of the 552,800 registered voters, 452,221 (81.8%) had voted. When seats were distributed, however, the Alliance held a majority – 46 to the 22 received by the MMM. The disproportionate weighting of seats reflects the fact that MMM votes were concentrated in urban constituencies where large numerical majorities won only three seats, whereas the Alliance swept the rural constituencies where Hindus predominated.

Within months of taking office, the Alliance began a process of fragmentation that by 1986 left the government without a working majority in parliament. When in February 1984, the MLP (Mauritius Labour Party) left the government, 11 of its MPs continued to support the government and formed a faction within the MLP called the Rassemblement des Travaillistes Mauriciens (RTM). Upon proroguing parliament in November 1986, Jugnauth agreed that an election was necessary.

Parliament was dissolved on 3 July, and the election date set for 30 August 1987, one year ahead of schedule. Campaigning started on 22 July 1987. Jugnauth's Alliance fought the election with his MSM (Militant Socialist Movement), Duval's MPSD (Parti Mauricien Social Démocrate), and both major factions of the MLP, the one led by Satcam Boolell and the RTM. The MMM allied itself with two small parties, the Mouvement Travailliste Démocrat (RTD) and the Front des Travailleurs Socialiste (FTS). A total of 639,488 voters were registered (approximately 60% of the total population) and of these, 546,623 (85.5%) cast their votes. A total of 359 candidates ran for the 62 elected seats. During the election campaign, the ruling MSM/MLP/PMSD alliance was known as the Sun (Soleil) and the opposing union (composed of MMM/MTD/FTS) as the Heart (Coeur) after their respective emblems.

While overall participation of voters in the polling amounted to 85.5%, it ran up to 93% in some constituencies. The average size of the multimember constituencies was around 30,000. As in previous elections, the MMM and its partners received the highest percentage of votes, 48.12%, of which a small percentage can be attributed to its two small partners (see 1987 Legislative Assembly election results for more detail). It won 21 seats, comprising 19 of the 30 urban seats, and only two of the 30 rural seats. The Alliance (MSM/PMSD/MLP) won a total of 49.86% and 39 seats. After the best-loser seats were allocated, the Alliance held 46 seats to the MMM's 24. The two seats of the Organisation du Peuple Rodriguais helped to raise those of the Alliance to 46.

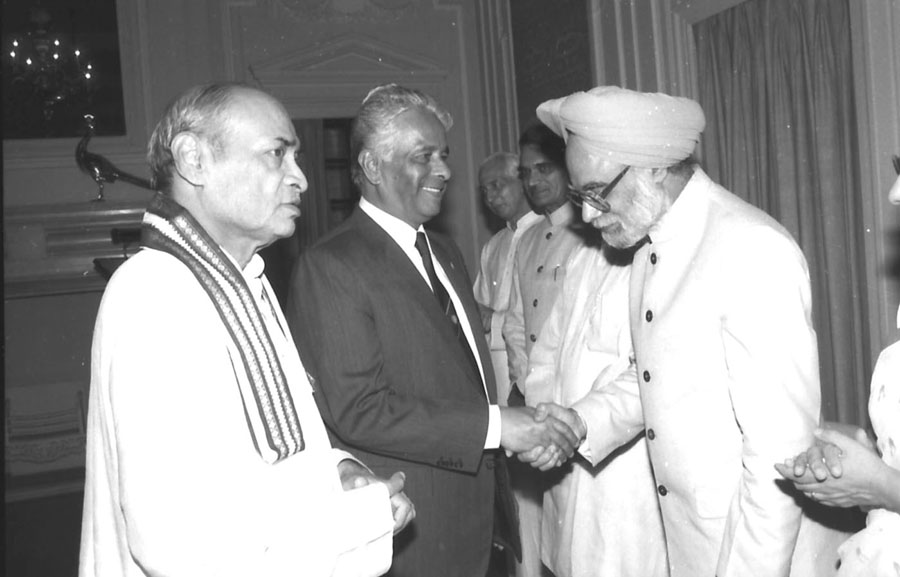
Jugnauth (center) with Indian Prime Minister P. V. Narasimha Rao (left) and Finance Minister Manmohan Singh (right) in New Delhi, 1991

On 6 August 1991, Jugnauth dissolved the national assembly and announced that a general election would be held on 15 September, nearly a year early. Jugnauth led an alliance of his MSM (Militant Socialist Movement) with the MMM (Mauritian Militant Movement) and the RTD (Rassemblement des Travaillistes Mauriciens) against an alliance of the MLP (Mauritius Labour Party) and the PMSD (Parti Mauricien Social Démocrate). The MSM/MMM/RTD alliance was better prepared than the opposition. Before the election date had been announced, it had already drawn up its list of candidates for the 20 constituencies and published its election manifesto. The opposition lost valuable time with lengthy negotiations concerning candidates and manifesto. Some 25 parties and independents and 331 candidates were involved. According to official figures, 682,000 voters (about 63% of the total population of 1,083,000) were entitled to vote, and of these about 576,300 (84.5%) turned out. The government alliance's 56.3% of the vote gave it 57 seats in parliament, while the opposition's 39.9% of the vote gave it only three seats. Only four best-loser seats were allocated. Jugnauth once more ruled in Parliament House for a fourth term, and was once more elected prime minister.

=== Defeat and out from parliament: 1995–2000 ===
When Jugnauth lost a vote of confidence over a language issue that required an amendment to the constitution, he dissolved parliament on 16 November 1995 and called a snap election for 20 December. Candidates had to be nominated by 4 December, and the campaign was officially opened on 5 December. A record 506 candidates entered the fray in which some 42 parties and independents participated. A landslide victory for the opposition ended Jugnauth's rule as prime minister which had lasted since 1982. The Labour Party-Mauritian Militant Movement (MMM) alliance captured all 60 of the directly elected seats on the island of Mauritius with only 63.7% of the poll, representing a mere 51.1% of the total electorate. The two seats on the island of Rodrigues went to l'Organisation du Peuple de Rodrigues (OPR). The MSM-RMM alliance obtained 19.3% of the votes cast or the support of 15.4% of the total electorate, but even under the best-loser system it found itself without a single seat in the National Assembly. (Renouveau Militant Mauricien (RMM) was the name adopted by a substantial part of the MMM led by Dr. Prem Nababsing (after Bérenger had broken away from it in 1993 and retained the right to the name of MMM).

Only four best-loser seats were allocated and went to small parties with little national influence – two to the Mouvement Rodriguais in Rodrigues island and the other two respectively to the Hizbullah Party and the Parti Gaëtan Duval (PGD, formerly the PMSD). Jugnauth stood as a candidate at the by-election held in constituency No. 9 (Flacq/Bon Acceuil) in April 1998 but was defeated. He immediately initiated the idea of an MSM/MMM federation which eventually took shape in January 1999. The Federation was dissolved, however, after the defeat of its candidate at the by-election held on 19 September 1999.

Jugnauth founded the MSM/MMM Alliance with Bérenger, leader of the MMM, on 14 August 2000, based on equal sharing of power. At the general elections held on 11 September 2000, he was elected as first member of constituency No 7 (Piton/Rivière du Rempart) and was appointed prime minister.

=== Return to power: 2000–2003 ===
The outgoing prime minister, Navin Ramgoolam of the Mauritian Labor Party led a coalition with Xavier-Luc Duval, the leader of the Parti Mauricien Xavier Duval (PMXD). Duval was Minister of Finance in the previous government alliance formed in mid-1999. The other alliance was formed (for the fourth time) between Jugnauth (MSM) and Bérenger (MMM).

On 15 August 2000, the leaders of these two parties as well several other leaders from much smaller parties signed what they termed a 'historical electoral accord', which included a proposed sharing of the prime ministerial post between MSM leader Jugnauth and MMM leader Bérenger. Under this arrangement, Jugnauth would hold the post of prime minister for the first three years and Bérenger for the remaining two years. After surrendering the premiership to Paul Bérenger, Jugnauth would be called to assume the function of President of the Republic after reforms to strengthen the presidency, which was largely a symbolic post. The accord also provided for a reform of the electoral system to replace the "best losers system" gradually by proportional representation, and to end the Mauritius Broadcasting Corporation's monopoly over the electronic media.

In addition to sharing the post of prime minister, what made the MSM/MMM electoral accord exceptional was that it would allow, for the first time in the history of the island, a non-Hindu Mauritian to become the prime minister. The elections took place on 11 September 2000 with a total of 80.87% of registered voters casting their ballots. The MSM/MMM alliance won 54 of the directly elected seats.

Jugnauth agreed to step down and become president as from 2003. Former president Karl Offmann was also involved. He was put into the office of the president on the condition that he would remain president only for 19 months. Jugnauth became president under the transition with the so-called "sudden" resignation of President Offmann.

Jugnauth resigned as prime minister on 30 September 2003 at 13:30 and also as member of parliament at 15:00, giving his resignation letter to Speaker of the House on the same day. He announced his departure in a 20-minute speech given to the members of parliament stating that he was leaving the office to make room for a new prime minister.

"Everything said and done about me, I am proud to go down in history as a no-nonsense, honest and dedicated prime minister having done my duty in good faith and without fear or favour. I have understood our political adversaries and, taken at its most, all divergent views and attitudes have been mere manifestations to our democracy at its best", said Jugnauth in the speech before his departure.

He was sworn into the presidency on 7 October 2003 following the resignation of President Karl Offmann.

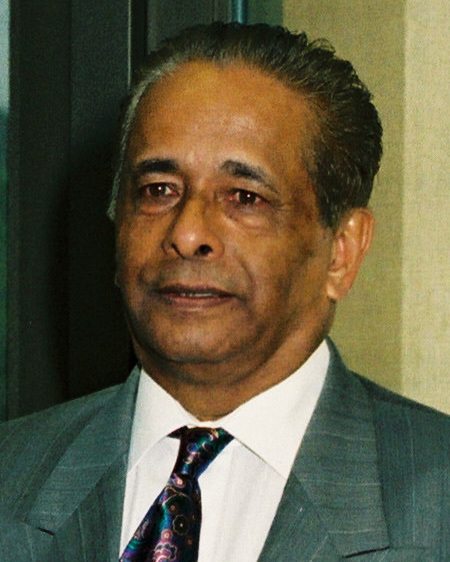
Jugnauth in 1995

=== Presidency: 2003–2012 ===
Jugnauth, along with Lady Jugnauth, took over the keys of the Chateau of Reduit on 7 October 2003. His election to the presidency was largely approved by the entire population as it was considered to be the new era of Mauritian politics, allowing Paul Berenger to become prime minister who was the first person of a non-Hindu religion to become head of government.

In 2003, he handed the leadership of his party to his son Pravind Jugnauth. He announced that he had "reached the end of this road". During his first mandate, due to the constitution, he had to announce general elections, which eventually took place in July 2005.

Due to the end of the mandate of Jugnauth, two persons, Vice President (Angidi Chettiar) and himself were the two persons nominated to the Presidency. He was voted for by both governing members of parliament as well as opposition MPs. Jugnauth was elected to the ceremonial post of President in 2003. After five years in office, he was re-elected by the National Assembly in a unanimous vote on 19 September 2008, supported by both the government and the opposition.

==== Second term: 2008–2014 ====
Parliament voted for Jugnauth to remain as President for a second term in 2008. Shortly after, during the by-election of 2008 in constituency No 8, the Militant Socialist Movement won with the support of the Labour Party and Pravind Jugnauth returned as MP for that constituency.

In 2010, two days after his 80th birthday, the Labour-MSM-PMSD alliance was made and Navin Ramgoolam dissolved the parliament in respect of general elections. The alliance won the election and the MSM returned 13 MPs.

However, in August 2011, the alliance broke and the MSM left the government leaving a very small majority for the prime minister. After having a private meeting with Berenger, the leader of the opposition, Jugnauth made a statement that he might resign as president if the situation got any worse concerning the Medpoint scandal which involved his son, Pravind, and who was summoned and arrested by the Independent Commission Against Corruption on conflict of interest.

Eventually he resigned as president on 30 March 2012. He mentioned that he did not support government policies, many thought his disagreement stemmed from the fact that the government refused to help his son, accused of corruption, escape from the law. He stated that he resigned because of his disagreement with the members of the government.

Soon after his resignation from the Presidency in 2012, Berenger proposed a 'remake' of the MSM/MMM coalition, which was approved by both parties' structures (political bureaus and central committees). Jugnauth became leader of the alliance with the same conditions. He would hold office of prime minister for three years before resigning to make way for Berenger. Following internal crisis between both parties in 2013 and early 2014, Berenger announced two 'cooling off' periods to allow time to resolve these issues. Berenger announced the end of the MSM/MMM in April 2014. He was criticized as he had (on the eve) attended Jugnauth's birthday party and gave a very flattering speech on his political career. After the party, he went in the same night to meet Ramgoolam at a nearby restaurant to discuss a forthcoming alliance. He further announced an alliance between his MMM and Ramgoolam's Labour Party.

=== Final premiership: 2014–2017 ===
In April 2014, Paul Berenger announced the dissolution of the coalition due to major disagreement within both parties. Later Berenger announced a coalition between the Labour Party and the Mauritian Militant Movement. Jugnauth then led a coalition composed of the Militant Socialist Movement, PMSD and the ML which is a break-away group of individuals who resigned from the MMM due to the coalition with the Labour Party. Jugnauth's alliance known as "L'Alliance LEPEP" won the 2014 general elections. When Ramgoolam dissolved parliament in end of November 2014, Jugnauth and the MSM conducted an alliance with the PMSD and Mouvement Liberateur (a dissident MMM party led by its former Deputy Leader, Ivan Collendaveloo). His alliance won 47 out of the 60 seats contested. Jugnauth became prime minister for the sixth time and made history as he led an alliance that won against a Labour Party-MMM alliance, which are considered as the two biggest parties (through their significant electorates) in the country. The MSM which lost much of its rural electorate was since Jugnauth's retirement considered the third national party. It nevertheless got its core electorate (from the 1980s) back following its appeal to vote for Jugnauth for a last time as he announced it would be the last election he would contest due to his advanced age.

On 12 September 2016, Jugnauth announced that he would be resigning as prime minister very soon due to his advanced age. On 23 January 2017 he resigned and made the leader of the largest party of the coalition the prime minister.

=== Minister Mentor: 2017–2019 ===
After resigning as Prime Minister in January 2017, Jugnauth was appointed to the newly created position of Minister Mentor, allowing him to remain actively involved in government affairs, including oversight of road traffic regulation, the police force, and Rodrigues Island matters.

Jugnauth advocating for the Chagos at the UN in 2017

In this role, he played a pivotal leadership role in Mauritius's diplomatic campaign to assert sovereignty regarding the separation of the Chagos Archipelago from Mauritius. Building on decades of advocacy, he guided Mauritius to secure a landmark United Nations General Assembly resolution in 2017, which requested an advisory opinion from the International Court of Justice (ICJ) on the legality of the United Kingdom’s continued control of the islands.

In February 2019, the ICJ issued an historic advisory opinion declaring that the United Kingdom's administration of the Chagos Archipelago was unlawful and that sovereignty should be returned to Mauritius. The court held that the detachment of the archipelago from Mauritius at the time of independence violated international law. This opinion marked a major diplomatic victory, greatly strengthening Mauritius's international standing.

=== Senior Statesman and Political Mentor: 2019–2021 ===
During the 2019 elections, the ruling alliance led by Pravind Jugnauth, his son, campaigned on the government's record of economic reform, social welfare improvements, and infrastructure development. While Sir Anerood Jugnauth was not a public face in the election, his enduring political stature and past leadership continued to lend credibility and support to the coalition's message.

After the 2019 general elections, Sir Anerood Jugnauth played a significant yet indirect role in Mauritian politics. Although he no longer held any ministerial or government portfolio, he remained an influential elder statesman within the political landscape.

He remained engaged with political affairs in a more advisory and ceremonial role until his death on 3 June 2021, maintaining a respected position as a founding father of modern Mauritius.

== Assassination attempts ==
Overall, there have been 4 attempts on Sir Anerood Jugnauth's life. Two of those attempts were whilst he held office.

The first one during his tenure was on 6 November 1988 at an Arya Samaj gathering in the suburb of Trèfles, Rose Hill by Satanand Sembhoo who drew a pistol to Prime Minister Jugnauth's head before being disarmed by bodyguards and onlookers.

This was followed by a second attempt on 3 March 1989 at a temple in Ganga Talao when armed with a razor blade and disguised as a Hindu pilgrim, Iqbal Ghani assaulted Prime Minister Jugnauth.

Both attempts were believed to be the result of drug cartels, against whom Jugnauth was leading a crack-down.

== Personal life ==
Jugnauth was the owner of a building company on Mauritius, located at the Sun Trust Building situated at La Rue Edith Cavell, Port Louis. This building was the subject of controversies and critics as the owner leased its floor space at high prices which were achieved at the peak of the local property market's cycle. The Government's Ministry of Education department was a tenant of the Sun Trust Building until 1995 when newly elected Minister, James Burty-David, refused to use that building. The government then relocated the department into another building. The penalty paid to Jugnauth in terms of breach of contract amounted to Rs 45 million (US$1.5 million).

He was the patriarch of the Jugnauth family of Mauritius. Jugnauth married Sarojini Ballah on 18 December 1956 and he is the father of two children: Pravind and Shalini Jugnauth-Malhotra. Pravind has been Prime Minister of Mauritius since 2017 and was previously Minister of Finance as a Member of Parliament for the Constituency Moka & Quartier Militaire. Pravind is also the leader of the Mouvement Socialiste Militant (MSM).

He was also the only Mauritian who served as an elected member on each level in the country as he first served as village & town Councillor (being elected as a Councillor for Palma village in 1956 and again Councillor for the town of Vacoas-Phoenix in 1964). He then served as a Member of Parliament (elected in 1963), became Minister of State in 1965 which preceded his appointment as Minister of Labour in 1966 by Seewoosagur Ramgoolam. He was the only prime minister to have had a sibling and his son in his own cabinet from 2000 to 2003.

On 3 June 2021, Jugnauth died at Clinique Darné in Floréal, Mauritius, aged 91, due to illness.

== Controversies ==
Jugnauth was subjected to various controversies over his 35 years of being on the front bench of Mauritian politics. In 1983, he was criticized for breaking the MMM-PSM coalition government and ousting the MMM from power. In 1984, he was criticized as head of government in the Amsterdam boys scandal which involved 4 government MPs who were arrested as they were carrying drugs from the Netherlands. He prorogued parliament in an objective to prevent any questions on the investigation. In 1988, he fired Satcam Boolell, then leader of the Labour Party, due to political disagreements.

Jugnauth opening the hearing of the Chagossian dispute territory in the ICJ

In May 1992, a scandal erupted when the Bank of Mauritius issued a new Rs 20 note having the portrait of Sarojini Jugnauth. It was considered to be a birthday gift from Anerood to his wife. This was a major controversy whereby Jugnauth himself had to apologise in parliament to a private notice question from the opposition. He confirmed that he had reluctantly agreed to the proposal of the Bank of Mauritius to issue such a note. He expressed his sincere apologies and assured the population that he shall not commit such a mistake in the future.

In 1995, months before the general elections which Jugnauth would lose, the then government gave a contract to Sun Trust Building (owned by the Jugnauth family) for a period of 10 years. This was controversial as Jugnauth was the owner of the Building and at the same time was prime minister. The newly elected Labour Party-MMM government decided to rescind the contract. Jugnauth sued for damages and received Rs 45 million (US$1.5 million) as compensation. This was criticized in the press and among the Mauritian diaspora.

In 2007, Jugnauth threatened to have Mauritius leave the Commonwealth in protest at the UK's "barbarous" treatment of the people of the Chagos Islands. Jugnauth stated that he might take the United Kingdom to the International Court of Justice over the islanders' plight. The Chagos Islands, a British colony in the Indian Ocean, were leased to the US in the 1960s to build a military base. The residents were forced out, and the government says they cannot return, but have been granted British citizenship and has donated around 40 million pounds to the people who numbered 2,000 at the time. Many of the residents now live in poverty in Mauritius as that state has left them destitute, or as refugees in Britain where they have their housing and costs paid for, and receive financial aid to take the British to court. The American base was built on the large island of Diego Garcia within the Chagos archipelago. Mauritius claims the islands as part of its territory, and Jugnauth claimed his country was forced by the British to accept the Chagossians as a condition of independence.

== Honours ==
- Queen's Counsel (1980)
- Her Majesty's Most Honourable Privy Council (1983)

Jugnauth bore the title Right Honourable for life as a member of the Privy Council. He was also entitled to use the post-nominals MP, having been elected as an MP for more than 35 years, and QC, since he was made as Queen's Counsel in 1980.

=== National honours ===
- Mauritius:
  - Grand Commander of the Order of the Star and Key of the Indian Ocean (2003)
  - Knight Commander of the Order of St Michael and St George (1988)

=== Foreign honours ===
- France:
  - Grand Officer of the Order of Legion of Honour (March 1990)
- India:
  - Padma Vibhushan (26 January 2020)
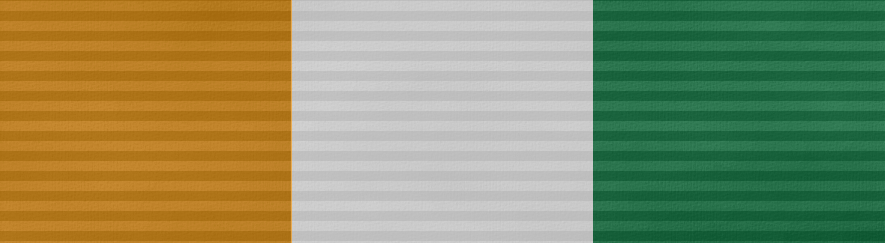
  - Pravasi Bharatiya Samman (9 January 2003)
- Japan:
  - Grand Cordon of the Order of the Rising Sun (January 1988)
- Francophonie:
  - Grand Cross of the Order of La Pléiade (1984)

Jugnauth was one of the only two prime ministers who served under Queen Elizabeth II and the pre-republic regime. There is one primary school in his former constituency, Riviere du Rempart under his name, known as Sir Anerood Jugnauth Government School, situated in the north of the country.

=== Other honours ===
- Honorary Doctorate from Aix-Marseille University (March 1985)
- Doctor of Civil Law (Honoris Causa) from the University of Mauritius (May 1985)
- Honorary Doctorate from Middlesex University (July 2009)

He has also a commemorative golden Mauritian rupee coin issued by the Bank of Mauritius having his portrait on the obverse and a Dodo on the reverse. The inscriptions are "THE Rt HON SIR ANEROOD JUGNAUTH PC, QC, KCMG " and is followed by "MAURITIUS". It originally holds a value of Rs 1,000 but is sold as a collector's piece at US$1,881. On 19 December 2010, he and his wife, Sarojini Ballah went to receive an official opening of a pictorial biography of the President himself showing his path from small age poor child to him being President of Mauritius in 2010 leaving behind him a rich career as one of the leaders of the country. The biography is entitled The Rise of a Common Man. Present at the ceremony were former prime minister Navin Ramgoolam, Vice Prime Minister Pravind Jugnauth and other ministers as well as friends of the latter.

Political offices
Preceded by Sookdeo Bissoundoyal	Leader of the Opposition; 1976–1982	Succeeded by Gaetan Duval
Preceded by Seewoosagur Ramgoolam	Prime Minister of Mauritius; 1982–1995	Succeeded by Navin Ramgoolam
Preceded by Navin Ramgoolam	Prime Minister of Mauritius; 2000–2003	Succeeded by Paul Bérenger
Preceded by Karl Offmann	President of Mauritius; 2003–2012	Succeeded by Monique Ohsan Bellepeau; Acting
Preceded by Navin Ramgoolam	Prime Minister of Mauritius; 2014–2017	Succeeded by Pravind Jugnauth
