= 1976 Mauritian general election =

← 1967	20 December 1976	1982 →

All 62 directly elected seats in the Legislative Assembly (and up to 8 BLS seats)
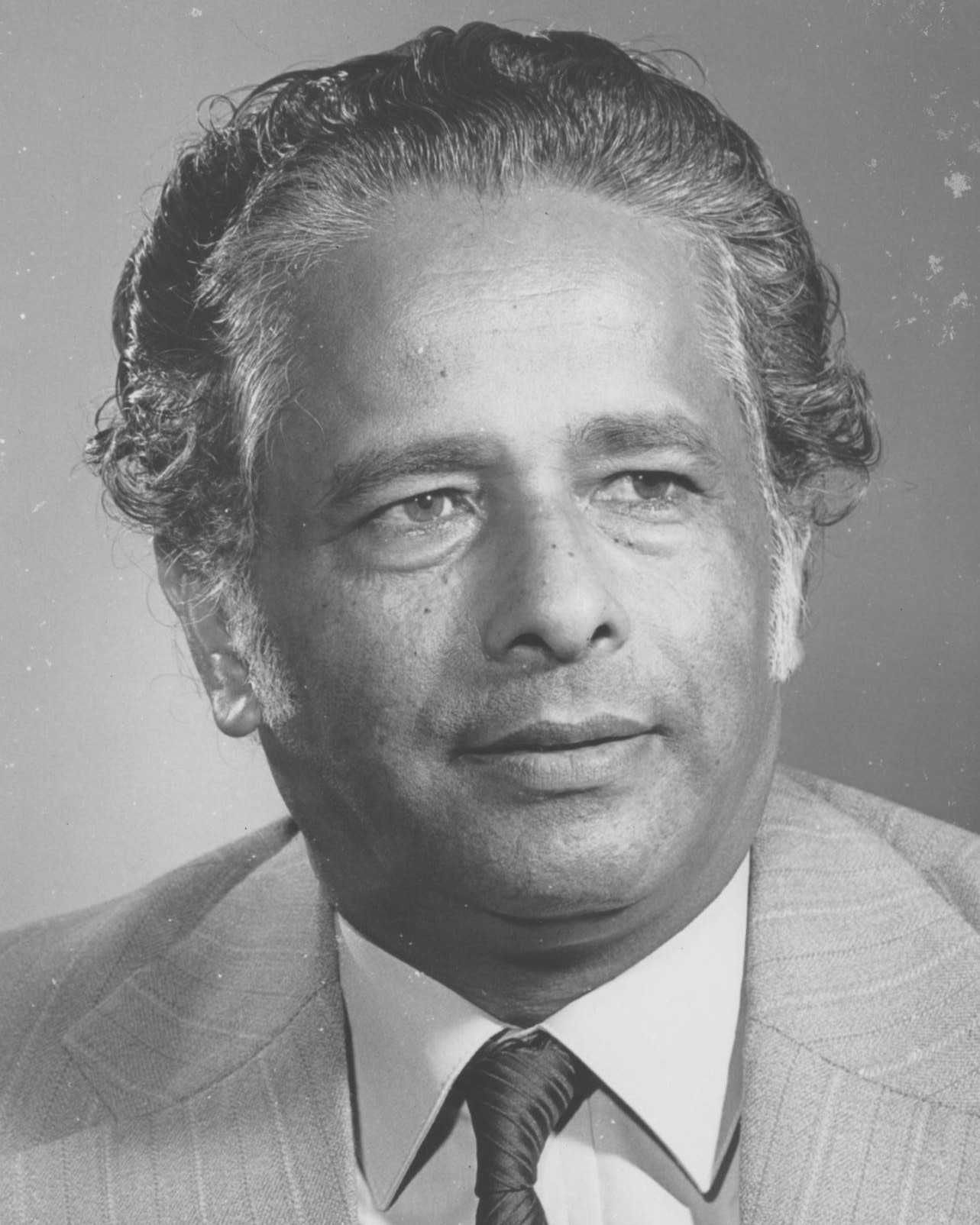

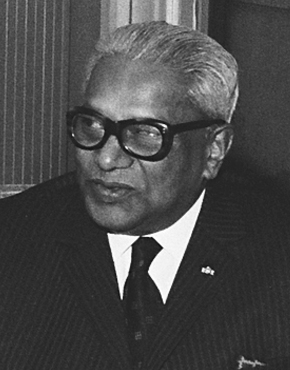

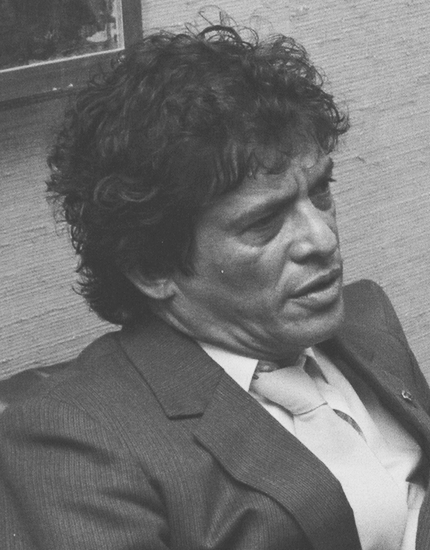
	First party	Second party	Third party
Leader	Anerood Jugnauth	Seewoosagur Ramgoolam	Gaëtan Duval
Party	MMM	Labour	PMSD
Alliance		Independence Party
Last election	New	54.66%, 30 seats	43.53%, 27 seats
Seats won	34	28	8
Seat change	▲34	▼3	▼19
Popular vote	469,420	461,949	200,559
Percentage	38.69%	38.08%	16.53%
- Result by constituency. The colour shade shows the percentage of the elected candidate with the highest number of votes
Prime minister before election
Seewoosagur Ramgoolam
Labour
Subsequent Prime minister
Seewoosagur Ramgoolam
Labour

General elections were held in Mauritius on 20 December 1976. They were the first general elections to be held since independence on 12 March 1968 and came nine years after the previous elections in 1967. Although elections had been scheduled for 1972, they were cancelled by the Labour Party–Parti Mauricien Social Démocrate–Muslim Committee of Action coalition government due to political unrest. The year prior to these elections was marked by the May 1975 Students protest riots.

The Mauritian Militant Movement won the most seats, but a coalition government was formed by the Independence Party (a coalition of the Labour Party, Muslim Committee of Action and Independent Forward Bloc) and the Parti Mauricien Social Démocrate. Around 400 candidates representing thirty-one parties contested the election, but only three parties won seats. Voter turnout was 88%.

== Electoral system ==
The voting system involved twenty constituencies on Mauritius, which each elected three members. Two seats were elected by residents of Rodrigues, and eight seats were filled by the nominated "best losers".

== Results ==
The best losers included Yousuf Mohamed and Harold Walter.

Party or alliance		Votes	%	Seats			
Party or alliance		Votes	%	Cons	BL	Total	+/–
Mauritian Militant Movement		469,420	38.69	30	4	34	New
Independence Party	Labour Party	461,949	38.08	25	3	28	–2
Independence Party	Muslim Committee of Action	461,949	38.08	0	0	0	–5
Independence Party	Total	461,949	38.08	25	3	28	–15
Parti Mauricien Social Démocrate		200,559	16.53	7	1	8	–19
Independent Forward Bloc		26,902	2.22	0	0	0	–12
Mauritian Democratic Union		12,505	1.03	0	0	0	New
Progressive Socialist Party		9,807	0.81	0	0	0	New
Rodrigues People's Organisation		6,376	0.53	0	0	0	New
Mauritian Militant Socialist Movement		5,372	0.44	0	0	0	New
Progressive Party of the South		2,223	0.18	0	0	0	New
Republican Centre Party		1,636	0.13	0	0	0	New
Labour Unity Liberals		800	0.07	0	0	0	New
Mauritius Muslim Democratic League		266	0.02	0	0	0	New
Mauritius People's Progressive Party		249	0.02	0	0	0	New
Communist Party of Mauritius		244	0.02	0	0	0	New
Mauritius Muslim Rights		236	0.02	0	0	0	New
Mauritius United Party		186	0.02	0	0	0	New
Movement and the Mauritian Socialist Youth		174	0.01	0	0	0	New
People's Democratic Party		143	0.01	0	0	0	New
Union of the General Population		92	0.01	0	0	0	New
Independents		14,021	1.16	0	0	0	New
**Total**		**1,213,160**	**100.00**	**62**	**8**	**70**	**0**
Valid votes		407,526	97.97				
Invalid/blank votes		8,423	2.03				
Total votes		**415,949**	**100.00**				
Registered voters/turnout		462,149	90.00				
Source: Electoral Commission, Electoral Commission, Nohlen et al.

=== By constituency ===
Constituency		Elected MPs	Party
1	Grand River North West– Port Louis West	Jack Bizlall	MMM
1	Grand River North West– Port Louis West	Edouard Jérôme Boulle	MMM
1	Grand River North West– Port Louis West	Rajnee Dyalah	MMM
2	Port Louis South– Port Louis Central	Kader Bhayat	MMM
2	Port Louis South– Port Louis Central	Noël Lee Cheong Lem	MMM
2	Port Louis South– Port Louis Central	Rajiv Servansingh	MMM
2	Port Louis South– Port Louis Central	Kamil Ramoly (best loser)	PMSD
3	Port Louis Maritime– Port Louis East	Bashir Khodabux	MMM
3	Port Louis Maritime– Port Louis East	Cassam Uteem	MMM
3	Port Louis Maritime– Port Louis East	Osman Gendoo	MMM
4	Port Louis North– Montagne Longue	Suresh Moorba	MMM
4	Port Louis North– Montagne Longue	Shree Krisna Baligadoo	MMM
4	Port Louis North– Montagne Longue	Sylvio Michel	MMM
5	Pamplemousses–Triolet	**Seewoosagur Ramgoolam**	PTr
5	Pamplemousses–Triolet	Gyandeo Daby	PTr
5	Pamplemousses–Triolet	**Rabindrah Ghurburrun**	PTr
6	Grand Baie–Poudre D'Or	**Mooneeswar Hurry**	PTr
6	Grand Baie–Poudre D'Or	Madan Dulloo	MMM
6	Grand Baie–Poudre D'Or	Dharmanand Goopt Fokeer	MMM
7	Piton–Riviere du Rempart	Rammesh Jeewoolall	PTr
7	Piton–Riviere du Rempart	**Simadree Virahsawmy**	PTr
7	Piton–Riviere du Rempart	Anerood Jugnauth	MMM
8	Quartier Militaire–Moka	**Veerasamy Ringadoo**	PTr
8	Quartier Militaire–Moka	**Mahess Teeluck**	PTr
8	Quartier Militaire–Moka	Krishnalall Coonjan	MMM
8	Quartier Militaire–Moka	**Yousuf Mohamed** (best loser)	PTr
9	Flacq–Bon Accueil	Dwarkanath Gungah	MMM
9	Flacq–Bon Accueil	Kanchandraseeh Bussawon	PTr
9	Flacq–Bon Accueil	Vijay Jandoosing	MMM
10	Montagne Blanche– Grand River South East	Ramduthsingh Jaddoo	MMM
10	Montagne Blanche– Grand River South East	**Satcam Boolell**	PTr
10	Montagne Blanche– Grand River South East	Jagdishwar Goburdhun	MMM
10	Montagne Blanche– Grand River South East	Azize Asgarally (best loser)	MMM
11	Vieux Grand Port–Rose Belle	Radha Gungoosingh	PTr
11	Vieux Grand Port–Rose Belle	**Dayanundlall Basant Rai**	PTr
11	Vieux Grand Port–Rose Belle	Premdut Doongoor	PTr
12	Mahebourg–Plaine Magnien	**Lutchmeeparsad Badry**	PTr
12	Mahebourg–Plaine Magnien	Lutchmeeparsadsing Ramsahok	MMM
12	Mahebourg–Plaine Magnien	Harris Ramphul	MMM
12	Mahebourg–Plaine Magnien	Louis Amedee Darga (best loser)	MMM
12	Mahebourg–Plaine Magnien	**Harold Walter** (best loser)	PTr
13	Riviere des Anguilles–Souillac	Harish Boodhoo	PTr
13	Riviere des Anguilles–Souillac	Suresh Chandra Poonith	MMM
13	Riviere des Anguilles–Souillac	Swalay Kasenally	MMM
14	Savanne–Black River	Hurrydew Ramchurn	PTr
14	Savanne–Black River	Kaleshwarao Saccaram	PTr
14	Savanne–Black River	Jean-Claude Augustave	MMM
15	La Caverne–Phoenix	Kailash Purryag	PTr
15	La Caverne–Phoenix	Iswardeo Seetaram	PTr
15	La Caverne–Phoenix	Razack Peeroo	PTr
16	Vacoas–Floreal	Rohit Beedassy	PTr
16	Vacoas–Floreal	**Emmanuel Bussier**	PTr
16	Vacoas–Floreal	**Angidi Chettiar**	PTr
17	Curepipe–Midlands	Pierre Simonet	PMSD
17	Curepipe–Midlands	Alain Maurice Espitalier-Noël	PMSD
17	Curepipe–Midlands	Marie Ghislaine Henry	PMSD
17	Curepipe–Midlands	Clarel Desiré Malherbe (best loser)	PTr
18	Belle Rose–Quatre Bornes	Paul Bérenger	MMM
18	Belle Rose–Quatre Bornes	James Burty David	PTr
18	Belle Rose–Quatre Bornes	Heeralall Bhugaloo	PTr
19	Stanley–Rose Hill	Jean–Claude de l'Estrac	MMM
19	Stanley–Rose Hill	Shirin Aumeeruddy-Cziffra	MMM
19	Stanley–Rose Hill	Vijayanathan Venkatasamy	MMM
20	Beau Bassin–Petite Riviere	Robert Rey	PMSD
20	Beau Bassin–Petite Riviere	**Eliézer Francois**	PMSD
20	Beau Bassin–Petite Riviere	Vidula Nababasing	MMM
20	Beau Bassin–Petite Riviere	Finlay Salesse (best loser)	MMM
20	Beau Bassin–Petite Riviere	Jean Claude Bibi (best loser)	MMM
21	Rodrigues	Cyril Guimbeau	PMSD
21	Rodrigues	Nicol François	PMSD
Source: Government of Mauritius; **Bold** indicates reelected incumbent MP.
