= Alex Rima =

Mauritian politician (born 1929)

Jean Alex Rima

Minister of Employment
- In office 1969–1972
- Prime Minister: Seewoosagur Ramgoolam

Lord Mayor of Port Louis
- In office 1965–1966

Personal details
- Born: 29 August 1929 Mauritius
- Party: PMSD

Jean Alex Rima (born 29 August 1929, date of death unknown) was a Mauritian politician.

== Political career ==
Alex Rima was a trade unionist who founded the Organisation de l’Unité des Artisans(OUA) to fight for the rights of manual workers. One of his recruits was Rajpalsingh Allgoo who became OUA's negotiator, and later became an influential figure in industrial relations.

In 1965 Alex Rima was elected as Lord Mayor of Port Louis, replacing A. Monaf Fakira. During Rima's 1-year term A. R. Abdool Carrim was the Deputy Lord Mayor. In 1966 Rima was replaced by D. Moorghen and Carrim was replaced by Norbert Poupard.

At the 1967 general elections Alex Rima was a candidate of the Parti Mauricien Social Démocrate(PMSD) in Constituency No. 4 - Port Louis North and Montagne Longue but he was defeated by pro-Independence IFB-CAM-Labour coalition candidates Foogooa, Bundhun and Rault. However he secured one the eight special seats in the Legislative Council as a nominated member, that is, as a Best Loser. In 1969 he became Minister of Employment and Labour soon after the IFB left the government, and when his party's leader Gaëtan Duval entered a coalition with Ramgoolam's Labour Party.

== Larceny charges, conviction, revocation and death ==
Rima made a legal precedent for being the first serving minister to be privately prosecuted on a charge of larceny, after which he was convicted and sentenced. Rima was revoked from office after the Court of Appeal upheld his conviction and sentence. Rima is deceased.

== See also ==
- 1965 Mauritius race riots
- 1967 Port Louis riots
- 1968 Mauritian riots
