= Union Démocratique Mauricienne =

Political party in Mauritius

- Founded: 1969
- Ideology: Conservatism; Francophilia
- Political position: Centre-right to right-wing
- Colours: Orange

Election symbol
- Torch Flambeau

The Union Démocratique Mauricienne (UDM) was a political party in Mauritius.

== History ==
In 1969 the Union Démocratique Mauricienne (UDM) was founded by barrister and politician Guy Ollivry and other members of the Legislative Assembly following their resignation from the Parti Mauricien Social Démocrate (PMSD). Other prominent figures who left the PMSD to join the newly-formed UDM were Raymond Rivet and Maurice Lesage. They refused to support PMSD's leader Gaëtan Duval's decision to move, without elections, from Opposition to the ailing government led by Seewoosagur Ramgoolam who had lost the support of Sookdeo Bissoondoyal's IFB.

== Innovations ==
Before the dissolution of Ollivry's party in 1995 it campaigned for electoral reform, proportional representation, as well as share ownership of workers in each enterprise.

== Electoral success ==
Union Démocratique Mauricienne presented a large number of candidates at the 1976 Legislative Assembly elections, collecting 1.03% of votes but no UDM candidate was elected. At the 1982 General Elections the UDM's candidates collected 0.11% of votes but none of them was elected.

== Controversies ==
In 2005 during investigations by the Independent Commission Against Corruption (ICAC) on the embezzlement of nearly Rs 1 Billion from Mauritius Commercial Bank (MCB) to the detriment of the National Pensions Fund (NPF) by masterminds Teeren Appasamy, Robert Lesage, Dev Manraj, Renu Manraj, Thierry Sauzier and others, donations made to UDM came to light. Teeren Appasamy's associate Donald Ha Yeung revealed to ICAC that Rs 1 Million was used in an attempt to revive Guy Ollivry's defunct party UDM. In addition they also financed the Labour Party's congresses, a short-lived propagandist newspaper L'Indépendant, commemoration of Sir Seewoosagur Ramgoolam's birthday (Rs 0.9 Million), as well as air tickets for Navin Ramgoolam's travels. Appasamy's contact within the Labour Party was Navin Ramgoolam's Finance Minister Vasant Bunwaree.
