= 1967 Mauritian general election =

- 7 August 1967

All 62 directly elected seats in the Legislative Council (and up to 8 BLS seats)
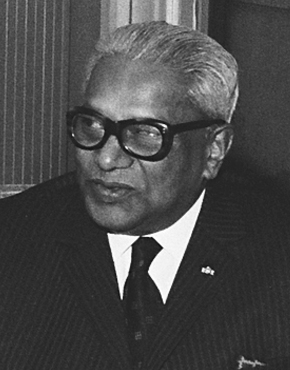

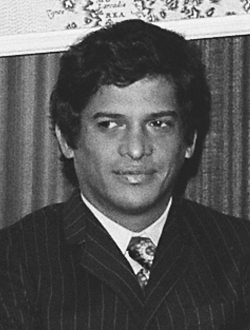
| | First party | Second party |
|---|---|---|
| Leader | Seewoosagur Ramgoolam | Gaëtan Duval |
| Party | Labour | PMSD |
| Alliance | Independence Party |
| Last election | 30 seats | 34 seats |
| Seats won | 43 | 27 |
| Seat change | ▲13 | ▲19 |
| Popular vote | 444,737 | 354,193 |
| Percentage | 54.66% | 43.53% |
- Result by constituency. The colour shade shows the percentage of the elected candidate with the highest number of votes
Chief Minister before election
Seewoosagur Ramgoolam
Labour
Subsequent Chief Minister
Seewoosagur Ramgoolam
Labour

General elections were held in Mauritius on 7 August 1967. Ethnic violence broke out in Port Louis between Muslims, Creoles and Chinese. Anti-riot police used tear gas to restore peace.

The result was a victory for the Independence Party, an alliance of the Labour Party, Independent Forward Bloc and Comité d'Action Musulman, which won 43 of the 70 seats, allowing Labour leader and incumbent Prime Minister Seewoosagur Ramgoolam to form a government. Voter turnout was 89%.

== Electoral system ==
The voting system created twenty constituencies on Mauritius, which each elected three members. Two seats were elected by residents of Rodrigues, and eight seats were filled by a system known as "best losers" whereby the electoral commission would appoint eight unsuccessful candidates to ensure that ethnic minorities were fairly represented.

== Results ==
| Party or alliance | | Votes | % | Seats | | | |
| Party or alliance | | Votes | % | Cons | BL | Total | +/– |
|---|---|---|---|---|---|---|---|
| Independence Party | Labour Party | 444,737 | 54.66 | 23 | 3 | 26 | +7 |
| Independence Party | Independent Forward Bloc | 444,737 | 54.66 | 12 | 0 | 12 | +5 |
| Independence Party | Muslim Committee of Action | 444,737 | 54.66 | 4 | 1 | 5 | +1 |
| Independence Party | Total | 444,737 | 54.66 | 39 | 4 | 43 | New |
| Parti Mauricien Social Démocrate | | 354,193 | 43.53 | 23 | 4 | 27 | +19 |
| All Mauritius Hindu Congress | | 7,056 | 0.87 | 0 | 0 | 0 | New |
| National Socialist Workers Party | | 1,238 | 0.15 | 0 | 0 | 0 | New |
| Mauritius Liberation Front | | 843 | 0.10 | 0 | 0 | 0 | New |
| Mauritius Workers Party | | 501 | 0.06 | 0 | 0 | 0 | New |
| Mauritius Young Communist League | | 452 | 0.06 | 0 | 0 | 0 | New |
| Rodrigues Party | | 232 | 0.03 | 0 | 0 | 0 | New |
| Independents | | 4,425 | 0.54 | 0 | 0 | 0 | New |
| Total | | 813,677 | 100.00 | 62 | 8 | 70 | +30 |
| Valid votes | | 273,579 | 98.21 | | | | |
| Invalid/blank votes | | 4,983 | 1.79 | | | | |
| Total votes | | 278,562 | 100.00 | | | | |
| Registered voters/turnout | | 314,004 | 88.71 | | | | |
Source: Electoral Commission, Electoral Commission, EISA

=== By constituency ===
| Constituency | | MP | Party | Notes |
|---|---|---|---|---|
| 1 | Grand River North West– Port Louis West | Gaëtan Duval | PMSD | |
| 1 | Grand River North West– Port Louis West | Abdool Monaf Fakira | PMSD | |
| 1 | Grand River North West– Port Louis West | Augustin Moignac | PMSD | |
| 2 | Port Louis South– Port Louis Central | Abdool Carrim | PMSD | |
| 2 | Port Louis South– Port Louis Central | Marc Fok Seung | PMSD | |
| 2 | Port Louis South– Port Louis Central | Reynald Olivier | PMSD | |
| 2 | Port Louis South– Port Louis Central | Guy Balancy | PTr | Best Loser |
| 3 | Port Louis Maritime– Port Louis East | Ebrahim Dawood Patel | PMSD | |
| 3 | Port Louis Maritime– Port Louis East | Elias Oozeerally | PMSD | |
| 3 | Port Louis Maritime– Port Louis East | Moilin Jean Ah-Chuen | PMSD | |
| 3 | Port Louis Maritime– Port Louis East | Abdool Razack Mohamed | CAM | Best Loser |
| 4 | Port Louis North– Montagne Longue | Mohabeer Foogooa | IFB | |
| 4 | Port Louis North– Montagne Longue | Raouf Bundhun | CAM | |
| 4 | Port Louis North– Montagne Longue | Raymond Rault | IFB | |
| 4 | Port Louis North– Montagne Longue | Alex Rima | PMSD | Best Loser |
| 5 | Pamplemousses–Triolet | Seewoosagur Ramgoolam | PTr | |
| 5 | Pamplemousses–Triolet | Ramsoondar Modun | PTr | |
| 5 | Pamplemousses–Triolet | Lall Jugnauth | IFB | |
| 6 | Grand Baie–Poudre D'Or | Mooneeswar Hurry | PTr | |
| 6 | Grand Baie–Poudre D'Or | Bikramsingh Ramlallah | PTr | |
| 6 | Grand Baie–Poudre D'Or | Rameshwar Jaypal | IFB | |
| 7 | Piton–Riviere du Rempart | Hurrypersad Ramnarain | PTr | |
| 7 | Piton–Riviere du Rempart | Beergoonath Ghurburrun | PTr | |
| 7 | Piton–Riviere du Rempart | Simadree Virahsawmy | IFB | |
| 8 | Quartier Militaire–Moka | Veerasamy Ringadoo | PTr | |
| 8 | Quartier Militaire–Moka | Mahess Teeluck | PTr | |
| 8 | Quartier Militaire–Moka | Yousuf Mohamed | CAM | |
| 9 | Flacq–Bon Accueil | Ramnath Jeetah | IFB | |
| 9 | Flacq–Bon Accueil | Radhamohun Gujadhur | PTr | |
| 9 | Flacq–Bon Accueil | Gowtam Teelock | PTr | |
| 10 | Montagne Blanche– Grand River South East | Satcam Boolell | PTr | |
| 10 | Montagne Blanche– Grand River South East | Kher Jagatsingh | PTr | |
| 10 | Montagne Blanche– Grand River South East | Abdool Wahab Foondun | IFB | |
| 11 | Vieux Grand Port–Rose Belle | Tarraman Bundhun | PTr | |
| 11 | Vieux Grand Port–Rose Belle | Dayanundlall Basant Rai | IFB | |
| 11 | Vieux Grand Port–Rose Belle | Sookdeo Bissoondoyal | IFB | |
| 12 | Mahebourg–Plaine Magnien | Lutchmeeparsad Badry | PTr | |
| 12 | Mahebourg–Plaine Magnien | Gunnoo Gangaram | IFB | |
| 12 | Mahebourg–Plaine Magnien | Harold Walter | PTr | |
| 13 | Riviere des Anguilles–Souillac | Kistnasamy Sunassee | PTr | |
| 13 | Riviere des Anguilles–Souillac | Sheik Youssouf Ramjan | CAM | |
| 13 | Riviere des Anguilles–Souillac | Dayanand Ramdin | PTr | |
| 14 | Savanne–Black River | Kumar Gokulsing | PTr | |
| 14 | Savanne–Black River | Seewa Bappoo | IFB | |
| 14 | Savanne–Black River | Kistnasamy Tirvengadum | IFB | |
| 15 | La Caverne–Phoenix | Mohun Persad Kisnah | PTr | |
| 15 | La Caverne–Phoenix | Rajmohunsing Jomadar | PTr | |
| 15 | La Caverne–Phoenix | Abdool Hak Mahomed Osman | CAM | |
| 16 | Vacoas–Floreal | Angidi Chettiar | PTr | |
| 16 | Vacoas–Floreal | Preeduth Awootar Mewasing | PTr | |
| 16 | Vacoas–Floreal | Joseph Marcel Mason | PTr | |
| 16 | Vacoas–Floreal | Emmanuel Bussier | PMSD | Best Loser |
| 16 | Vacoas–Floreal | Tangavel Narrainen | PMSD | Best Loser |
| 16 | Vacoas–Floreal | Jocelyn Maingard | PMSD | Best Loser |
| 17 | Curepipe–Midlands | Gaëtan de Chazal | PMSD | |
| 17 | Curepipe–Midlands | Guy Marchand | PMSD | |
| 17 | Curepipe–Midlands | Krishna Ramlagan | PMSD | |
| 18 | Belle Rose–Quatre Bornes | Maurice Lesage | PMSD | |
| 18 | Belle Rose–Quatre Bornes | Yvon St. Guillame | PMSD | |
| 18 | Belle Rose–Quatre Bornes | Ajum Dahal | PMSD | |
| 18 | Belle Rose–Quatre Bornes | Guy Forget | PTr | Best Loser |
| 19 | Stanley–Rose Hill | Da Patten | PMSD | |
| 19 | Stanley–Rose Hill | Cyril Leckning | PMSD | |
| 19 | Stanley–Rose Hill | Henry Ythier | PMSD | |
| 20 | Beau Bassin–Petite Riviere | Raymond Rivet | PMSD | |
| 20 | Beau Bassin–Petite Riviere | Raymond Devienne | PMSD | |
| 20 | Beau Bassin–Petite Riviere | Sham Panchoo | PMSD | |
| 20 | Beau Bassin–Petite Riviere | Eliézer François | PTr | Best Loser |
| 21 | Rodrigues | Guy Ollivry | PMSD | |
| 21 | Rodrigues | Sylvio Roussety | PMSD | |
Source: Government of Mauritius
