= Lall Jugnauth =

Mauritian politician (1918–1970)

Attorney General of Mauritius
- In office August 1967 – August 1970
- Prime Minister: Seewoosagur Ramgoolam

Personal details
- Born: 15 November 1920 British Mauritius
- Died: 1 August 1970 (aged 49) Quatre Bornes, Mauritius

Lall Jugnauth (15 November 1920 – 1 August 1970) was actively involved in pre-colonial and post-colonial Mauritian politics.

== Early life ==
Lall Jugnauth was the cousin of Aneerood Jugnauth who subsequently became Prime Minister and President of Mauritius.

== Education and career ==
Lall Jugnauth travelled abroad to study law. When he returned to Mauritius he joined the Civil Service and became a Magistrate before resigning to become actively involved in politics.

== Political career ==
At the 21 October 1963 Legislative Council elections Lall Jugnauth was a candidate of Independent Forward Bloc (IFB) in Constituency No.18 Montagne Blanche (at the time when there were 40 Constituencies on the island) where he was defeated by rival Satcam Boolell of the Labour Party (Mauritius). At the 7 August 1967 Legislative Council elections Lall Jugnauth was elected as one of the three members for Constituency No.5 Pamplemousses-Triolet under the IFB banner and his running mates were Seewoosagur Ramgoolam and Ramsoondur Modun who were all part of the Independence Party (Mauritius). Lall Jugnauth became Attorney General from 1967 to 1969 when his party IFB (under Sookdeo Bissoondoyal's leadership) broke away from the ruling coalition. On 1 August 1970 Lall Jugnauth died, thus triggering by-elections in Constituency No.5. At these by-elections (held on 21 September 1970) Dev Virahsawmy won the seat previously held by Lall Jugnauth and also became the first ever member of parliament of the newly formed Mouvement Militant Mauricien (MMM).
