= Satyajit Boolell =

Mauritian lawyer

Director of Public Prosecutions
- In office 2009–2022
- Preceded by: Gérard Angoh
- Succeeded by: Rashid Ahmine

Parliamentary Counsel
- In office 2003–2009

Personal details
- Born: 31 December 1957 (age 68) Mauritius
- Spouse: Urmila Boolell
- Children: 3
- Parent: Satcam Boolell (father)
- Relatives: Arvin Boolell (brother)
- Education: University of Essex; King's College London (LL.M)

Satyajit Boolell (born 31 December 1957), also known as Ajit Boolell, is a Mauritian lawyer. He previously served as the Director of Public Prosecutions (2009-2022). Under the Asset Recovery Act, this role is considered the enforcement authority of asset recovery in Mauritius.

== Early life and education ==
Born on 31 December 1957, Boolell is the youngest son of Satcam Boolell. He completed his secondary education at Royal College Port Louis before studying economics at the University of Essex. After completing a Conversion Degree, he passed the Bar exam and was called to the Bar in England and Wales in 1985. He obtained a Master of Laws (LLM) degree from King's College London.

== Career ==
Following his tertiary education in England, Boolell returned to Mauritius, where he worked at his father's legal practice before joining the Civil Service in September 1986. In 1999, he worked on the L'Amicale riots case. He held the position of Parliamentary Counsel from 2003 to 2009 and in 2010 was made Senior Counsel. In February 2009, Boolell was appointed Director of Public Prosecutions (DPP) after the retirement of his predecessor, Gérard Angoh.
