= Kader Bhayat =

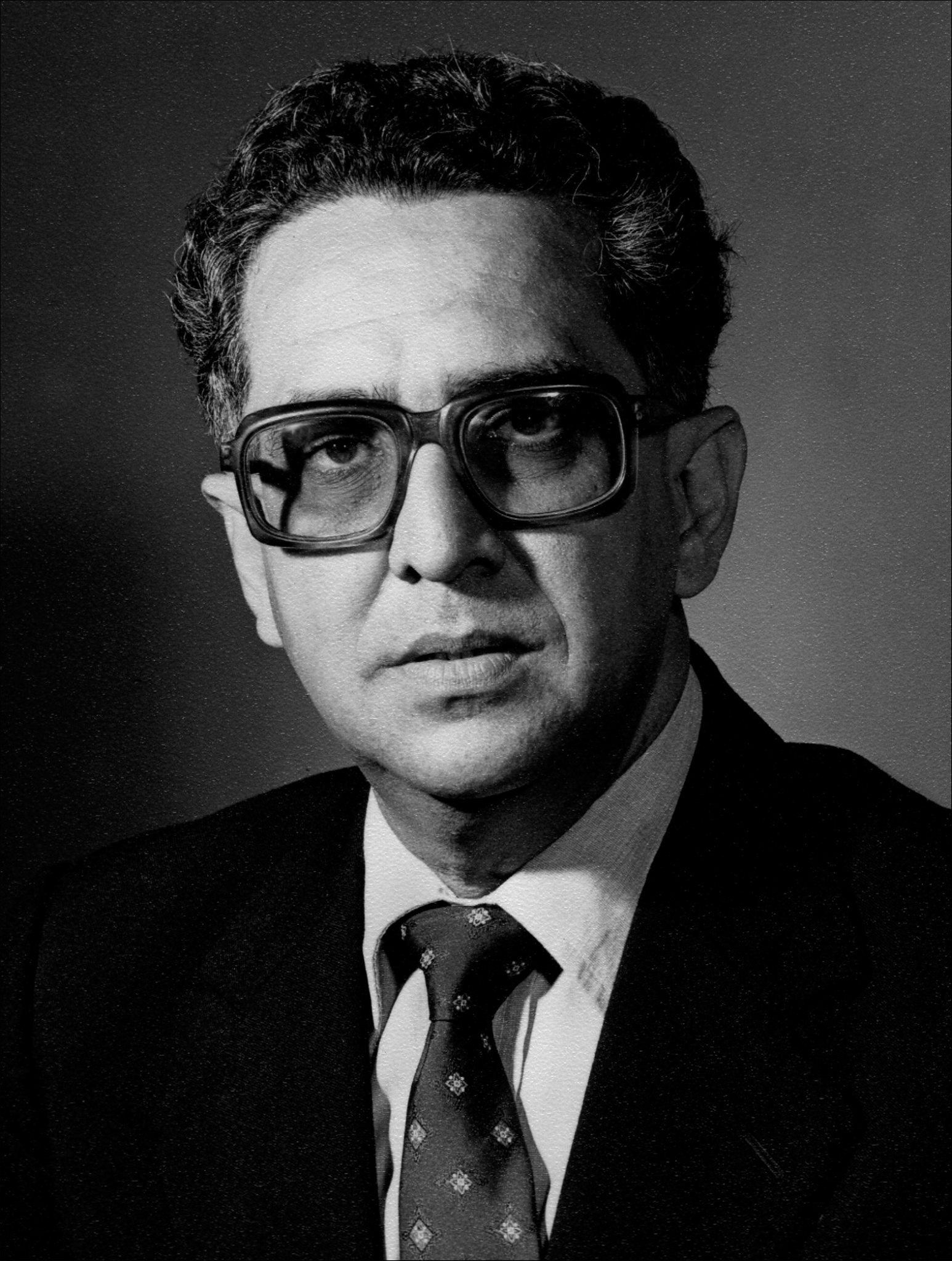

Minister of Commerce & Marine
- In office 1983–1986
- Prime Minister: Anerood Jugnauth

Minister of Commerce
- In office 1982–1983
- Prime Minister: Anerood Jugnauth

Member of Parliament
- In office 1976–1982
- Prime Minister: Seewoosagur Ramgoolam

Lord Mayor Port Louis
- In office 1977–1978

Vice-President MMM
- In office 1972–1983

Personal details
- Born: 15 June 1936 British Mauritius
- Died: 15 November 2012 (aged 76) Quatre Bornes

Abdool Kader Bhayat, commonly known as Kader Bhayat (Gujarati: કાદર ભાયાત; 1936-2012), was a Mauritian lawyer, politician and former minister. He died on 15 November 2012 at the age of 76.

== Early life and career ==
In 1936 Kader Bhayat was born in a wealthy family which originated from Surat in the state of Gujarat, India. He travelled to England where he studied law and was called to the Bar at the Lincoln's Inn.

== Political career ==
He joined the Mauritian Militant Movement (MMM) in 1972 and soon became one of the party's foremost spokespersons, along with Anerood Jugnauth and Paul Bérenger. He is credited for his efforts to keep the party alive when its leadership was thrown in jail by the Labour Party-PMSD regime for close to a year in 1972 following the 1970 Triolet No.5 by-elections and the December 1971 strikes. Kader is the one who maintained communication between the political prisoners and their supporters known as "militants". He was elected to the Legislative Assembly in 1976 in Constituency No.2 Port Louis along with MMM candidates Noël Lee Cheong Lem and Rajiv Servansingh.

In 1977 he became the first Lord Mayor of Port Louis to be elected from within the MMM. At the 1982 general elections he was elected with the highest number of votes in No.2 Port Louis along with Vijay Padaruth and Noël Lee Cheong Lem. He formed part of the Front Bench of the MMM-PSM ruling coalition under Prime Minister Aneerood Jugnauth's leadership and Kader became Minister of Commerce and Industry. Other members of that 1982 Front Bench were Harish Boodhoo and Paul Bérenger. When Jugnauth created his new party MSM in 1983 Kader Bhayat left the MMM and joined the MSM. At the 1983 elections Kader Bhayat was candidate at No.10 along with Sir Satcam Boolell. Although he had been presented as the next Deputy Prime Minister he only secured the position of Minister of Commerce and Maritime Transport as Gaëtan Duval was made Deputy Prime Minister. In January 1986 he resigned from the MSM-Labour government along with Anil Gayan, Kadress Pillay and Kailash Purryag.

== Legal career ==
In 1978 Kader Bhayat was politician Amédée Darga's defence attorney during the Sheik Hossen Scandal. During that same year Kader Bhayat represented MMM parliamentarian Vijay Jandoosing who was being prosecuted for having openly criticised the fine of Rs 500 which had been imposed on his colleague Krishnalall Coonjan by a magistrate in 1977. Jandoosing was sentenced to 6 months' jail by judge Maurice Rault. In 1989 he was the defence lawyer of Sir Gaëtan Duval who had been arrested on charges of having plotted the murder of Azor Adelaide (1971) following statements made by ex-prisoners Paul Sarah and Moorgesh Shummoogum.

In 1991 he was a candidate of the Labour Party against the MMM-MSM alliance. But at the 2000 elections he supported the campaign of the MSM-MMM alliance. From 2007 he formed part of the management board of the Bank of Mauritius where he supported Manou Bheenick during his term in office.

== Legacy ==
Throughout his career Kader Bhayat ensured the welfare of his electorate. In 1977 when he was elected Lord Mayor of Port Louis he nominated a dock-worker called Régis Grivon as his assistant to remain close to the common folk. Later Kader Bhayat donated his private property in Mare Gravier, Beau Bassin to enable construction of a local mosque.
