= Constituencies of Mauritius =

Map of the constituencies of Mauritius for the 2024 general election

Constituencies of Mauritius are the electoral boundaries within the Republic of Mauritius. They are also commonly referred to as Circonscriptions amongst the locals. The country follows the Westminster system and elects 60 members of parliament for a term of 5 years. There are in all 21 Constituencies in the republic, each of them returning 3 members with the exception of Constituency n°21, which returns only 2 members. The Constitution stipulates that there shall be 20 constituencies and one created specially for the Rodrigues island.

Those electoral boundaries are considered to be the main pillars for elections as they allow members of parliament to be elected and thus to form the government. As mentioned in the Constitution, the Electoral Boundaries Commission shall review the boundaries of the constituencies at such times as will enable them to present a report to the Assembly 10 years, as near as may be, after 12 August 1966 and, thereafter, 10 years after presentation of their last report.

Due to the ethnic diversity of Mauritius, the country's political system seeks to ensure that all ethnic groups are fairly represented. The Constitution identifies 4 main ethno-religious groups Hindus, Muslims, Sino-Mauritians and General Population. The latter is made up of anyone not part of the three other communities and mostly includes Mauritian Creoles and Franco-Mauritians.

== History of Constituencies ==
Before 1967, according to the previous (pre-independence) Constitution, Mauritius was divided into 40 constituencies with one Member of Parliament (MP) elected from each constituency. Elected MPs elected a Chief Minister as well as Council Members.

Today, the constituencies still remain more or less the same but, ever since independence, many of the previously smaller 40 constituencies have been reorganised so as to now form a total of 21 constituencies.

== Best Loser System ==
The Best Loser System ensures representation of minority ethno-religious groups in the parliament. In addition to the 62 directly elected members, the Constitution provides for the allocation of up to a maximum of 8 additional seats to the "Best Losers" who are unelected candidates from underrepresented ethno-religious groups. Most Best Losers have been from the General Population category followed by Muslims and Sino-Mauritian. Hindus are not excluded from securing a Best Loser seat as was the case most recently in 2000.

Since 2014, candidates may refuse to declare a communal identification. Those who do so cannot become members of parliament under the Best Loser System.

The Best Loser System was set up to prevent political and social tension however the debate on the abrogation of the Best Loser System is ongoing and was last seriously contemplated in 2012 in the Carcassonne Report.

Ethno-religious categorisations are declaratory and parties opposed to the Best Loser System have been known to show their opposition by making false claims with candidates giving incorrect answers when it comes to their ethno-religious background.

== The Constituencies in 2024 ==
Since the 1967 general elections the list of 21 Constituencies has not changed. The composition, for a total of 1.002,857 registered voters, of each constituency at the 2024 elections is shown in the table below.

Constituency No	Name of the Constituencies	Electoral Population	Ethnic majority
1	Grand River North West and Port Louis West	33,839	Creole/Hindu
2	Port Louis South and Port Louis Central	30,950	Muslim/Sino Mauritian/Creole
3	Port Louis Maritime and Port Louis East	31,325	Muslim
4	Port Louis North and Montagne Longue	59,584	Hindu/Creole
5	Pamplemousses and Triolet	59,580	Hindu
6	Grand Baie and Poudre d'Or	59,103	Hindu
7	Piton and Riviere du Rempart	46,516	Hindu
8	Quartier Militaire and Moka	49,313	Hindu
9	Flacq and Bon Accueil	60,301	Multi Ethnic
10	Montagne Blanche and Grand River South East	56,663	Hindu
11	Vieux Grand Port and Rose Belle	46,167	Hindu
12	Mahebourg and Plaine Magnien	41,732	Hindu
13	Riviere des Anguilles and Souillac	37,142	Muslim/Hindu/Creole
14	Savanne and Black River	51,997	Creole/Hindu
15	La Caverne and Phoenix	61,231	Muslim/Hindu/Creole
16	Vacoas and Floreal	46,651	Hindu/Creole
17	Curepipe and Midlands	47,428	Multi Ethnic
18	Belle Rose and Quatre Bornes	60,795	Multi Ethnic
19	Stanley and Rose Hill	41,956	Multi Ethnic
20	Beau Bassin and Petite Riviere	47,598	Multi Ethnic
21	Rodrigues	32,986	Rodriguan Creole

== Constituency No. 1 ==
The Constituency, namely Grand River North West and Port Louis West is Christian majority. It comprises part of Pailles, Point Aux Sables, La Tour König, GRNW and west part of Port Louis. With 33,839 voters, it is one of the most underdeveloped areas of Port Louis. All of the vicinity fall in the boundaries of the Capital and thus form one of the 4 constituencies of Port Louis city. Since the 1976 elections it has been a bastion of the MMM.

Notable members of parliament from the constituency were James Burty, former Minister of Rodrigues & Outer Islands and Anne Navarre Marie the former Minister of Women Rights. It is noted that the constituency is composed of the GRNW Prison and different rehabilitation centers as well as handicapped centers and various orphanage. It also contains the University of Technology, Mauritius situated at la Tour Koenig. The June 2010 mutiny at GRNW Prison within this constituency drew national attention due to the escape of 34 prisoners.

== Constituency No. 2 ==
Officially Port Louis South and Port Louis Central, this constituency is composed of the central area of the city, including its business centres, and the south part comprising suburban areas like Cassis, The Victoria Bus Terminal, The North Bus terminal, the Port Louis Market, Le Champ de Mars and Mainly Vallée Pitot. It is a Muslim majority area with a significant Sino-Mauritian minority and the smallest constituency in terms of voters with an electorate of only 30,950 voters.

The constituency was mostly a bastion of the MMM from 1976 to 2005 until Rashid Beebeejaun switched his political allegiance from the MMM to the Mauritian Labour Party and the constituency became a bastion of the Labour Party.

== Constituency No. 3 ==
Also known as Port Louis Maritime and Port Louis East, the constituency n°3 has an electorate of 31,325 people. It was originally constructed out of constituency n°2. This constituency was a bastion of the MMM since the 1970s. The governments led by Labour Party and MSM have neglected this constituency as none of their candidates was elected in No.3. That was until Dr M. Siddick Chady(labour party) broke the bastion of the MMM in 2000. Completed the turn around in 2005. The areas in this constituency are Plain Verte, Roche Bois, Terre Rouge, Batterie Cassée, Karo Kalyptis among others. The outer island of Agalega is also part of Constituency No. 3.

== Constituency No. 4 ==
Port Louis North and Montagne Longue constituency is the 4th and last electoral boundary of Port Louis City. The areas are among the most impoverished places in the country. It includes St Croix, Kailason, Creve Coeur ending in Montagne Longue. The constituency was among the constituencies left behind by Anerood Jugnauth led governments in the 80's as he had no MPs elected from there.

This constituency was a bastion of MMM since 1976 but is now disputed between the 3 main political parties, the MSM, MMM and the Mauritian Labour Party. It has recorded a total number of 59,585 voters in the 2024 elections.

== Constituency No. 5 ==
Pamplemousses and Triolet is the fifth constituency and one of the three main Hindu constituencies in the northern part of the country. It starts with the areas covering Pamplemousses, Triolet, Trou aux Biches ending near Mon Choisy. It had 59,580 voters registered for the 2024 general elections. It is a constituency which has an overall majority of Hindus reaching nearly 80% of the voters.

It was the constituency of Seewoosagur Ramgoolam and Navin Ramgoolam.

== Constituency No. 6 ==
Grand Baie and Poudre d'Or is one of the three main Hindu constituency in the north of Mauritius. The others being No 5 and No 7. Known to be a disputed electoral territory of the MSM and the Mauritius Labour Party, this constituency has a total of 59,103 registered electors.

The biggest centers of this Constituency is Grand Baie and Goodlands. Grand Baie, known to be the touristic center of the country has one of the foremost beautiful beaches, hotels and classic touristic boutiques. Goodlands is the most northern main residential and commercial town of this constituency. It is one of the pillars of the electoral area. Madan Dulloo who has been a member of the Labour Party, MSM and MMM was elected as Member of Parliament in 1983, 1987, 1991, 1995, 2000, and 2005 eventually losing for good in 2010.

== Constituency No. 7 ==
Piton and Riviere du Rempart is the seventh constituency and the last one of the three northern electoral boundaries of the Country. The constituency with an overall of Hindu majority has two important pillars which are, the commercial town, Riviere du Rempart and Piton. With 46,516 registered electors, this is a very historic constituency for being a bastion of the MSM since its formation.

The MSM founder Sir Anerood Jugnauth was a member of parliament for this constituency for nearly 50 years since his first election in 1963. Piton and Riviere du Rempart has been a bastion of the MSM since 1983.

== Constituency No. 8 ==
Quartier Militaire and Moka is an inland constituency with a registered number of 49,313 electors. With an absolute Hindu majority, this electoral boundary has important towns including Quartier Militaire, St Pierre and Moka with small adjacent villages including Camp Thorel, Solitude and Camp de Masque.

This constituency has had a member of the Jugnauth family as Member of Parliament since 1987. Ashock Jugnauth has been elected first member serving in 1987, 1991, 2000, and 2005. Pravind Jugnauth has been elected in 2009, 2010, 2014, and 2019.

== Constituency No. 9 ==
Flacq and Bon Accueil is the ninth constituency of the country. It is a coastal electoral boundary and is made up of the main town Flacq with some adjacent towns including Bon Accueil, Belle Mare, and Lallmatie. It has registered number of 60,301 electors.

It was a bastion of politician Anil Bachoo who has been member of parliament serving since 1991. He has been elected in 2000, 2005 and lastly 2010. Other notable politicians previously elected in this constituency include Sangeet Fowdar and Satya Faugoo.

== Constituency No. 10 ==
Montagne Blanche, Medine Camp de Masque, and Grand River South East is the 10th constituency of the country and is a coastal electoral boundary. Composed mostly of Hindus, it has a registered number of 56,663 electors.

For many years it was typically a Labour Party bastion. Former leader of the Labour Party, Sir Satcam Boolell was member of parliament serving more than 30 years in this constituency. It comprises Montagne Blanche, GRSE, Bel Air, Beau Champ and Trou d'Eau Douce.

== Constituency No. 11 ==
Vieux Grand Port and Rose Belle is the eleventh constituency and is a coastal constituency with 46,167 registered electors in 2024.

== Constituency No. 12 ==
Mahébourg and Plaine Magnien is the twelfth constituency. Its 41,732 voters are mostly Hindus.

== Constituency No. 13 ==
Rivière des Anguilles and Souillac is the thirteenth constituency. The electorate consists of 37,142 registered voters who belong to the Hindu, Muslim and Creole communities.

== Constituency No. 14 ==
Savanne and Black River is the fourteenth constituency. There are 51,997 voters in this constituency who are predominantly either Creoles or Hindus.

== Constituency No. 15 ==
La Caverne and Phoenix is the fifteenth constituency which is located inland. The bulk of its 61,231 voters belong to Hindu, Muslim or Creole ethnic groups and it's currently the constituency with the largest number of registered voters.

== Constituency No. 16 ==
Vacoas and Floreal is the sixteenth constituency which is also inland. The predominant ethnic groups are Hindus and Creoles. A total of 46,651 voters are registered in this constituency.

== Constituency No. 17 ==
Curepipe and Midlands is the seventeenth constituency in which there are 47,428 registered voters. They belong to all the ethnic groups.

== Constituency No. 18 ==
The eighteenth constituency of Mauritius is Belle Rose and Quatre Bornes. A total of 60,795 voters are recorded there and they come from all ethnic groups.

== Constituency No. 19 ==
The nineteenth constituency is Stanley and Rose Hill with a total of 41,956 registered voters. All ethnic groups are represented in this constituency.

== Constituency No. 20 ==
Beau Bassin and Petite Rivière is the twentieth constituency. It has 47,598 registered voters who come from all ethnic groups.

== Constituency No. 21 ==
The outer island of Rodrigues is the twenty-first constituency where 31,986 voters are registered. They belong mostly to the Rodriguan Creole community. Gaëtan Duval enabled the inhabitants of Rodrigues to vote for the first time in August 1967 although the principle of universal suffrage was already in practice on mainland Mauritius since 1959. Prior to the 1967 elections Gaëtan Duval's PMSD lodged a civil action in the Supreme Court of Mauritius to contest Rodriguans' inability to vote at general elections. The Supreme Court ruled in Duval's favour. This constituency sends only two MPs to the National Assembly but it has an autonomous local Assembly since 2003. Since the PMSD's decline in Rodrigues, the two national seats are mostly contested by local parties.
