= Quartier-Militaire =

Quartier Militaire
- Flag

- Location within Mauritius
- Coordinates: 20°15′S 57°33′E
- Country: Mauritius

Government
  - President: Sir Anerood Jugnauth
  - MPs: Pravind Jugnauth
  - Leela Devi Dookhun: Suren Dayal

Population (2016)
  - Total: 7,253
- Time zone: UTC+4 (MUT)

Quartier Militaire is a village in the centre of Mauritius, found in the Moka District. It houses the region's District Council. Its quarters and suburbs include Bonne Veine, Esperance, Providence, Vuillemin.

== Environment ==
Quartier Militaire is known for its cold temperature in Mauritius. The coolest temperature ever recorded in Quartier-Militaire was 5 degrees Celsius and also the cloudiest. To the east lies Camp De Masque, where the climate is hotter and also Medine, which has a much milder climate. To the south lies Phoenix, which is the closest town to Quartier Militaire. To the west lies the developing area of Saint Pierre.

Areas neighbouring the town are Curepipe, Hermitage, Belle Rive, Alma, Saint Pierre, Verdun, Highlands, Mont Ida and Melrose.

== Facilities ==
Educational institutes like the Shrimati Indira Gandhi SSS college, Quartier Militaire SSS (Girls) college are found there. The Sir Edward Walter Government School and St Leon RCA are primary school which educates young children. In Providence quarter there is the Lady Lydie Ringadoo Government School. Belle-Rive contains a medical educational institute. Young adults, mainly from India and Mauritius, are promoted to various sections of dental surgeries. Quartier-Militaire is one of many villages in Mauritius to have a private multi-lingual school teaching languages like English, French, Arabic, Spanish, Italian, German and Turkish.

Quartier-Militaire market is a meeting place for buyers and sellers, mainly busy on early Sunday mornings. There is a bus station, which is a two minute walk away from the market, where people can take buses to get to other places all over the country.

== Culture ==
The Quarter Militaire stadium is an attraction for the town's inhabitants. Providence is the major quarter for religious activities, boasting a big Hindu temple and an Islamic cultural centre, which will be the only one in Moka district, is being built there. Many old temples are still standing there.

Royal Plaza is known as Quartier Militaire's town Centre. It is a highly frequented area which comprises one mosque named Ittefaq-ul-muslemine Musjid, one church, the major bus station, police station, post office and several service facilities. There also in Quartier Militaire numerous health centres, youth clubs, football courts, several video clubs and groceries, shopping centers, apartments and also industries.

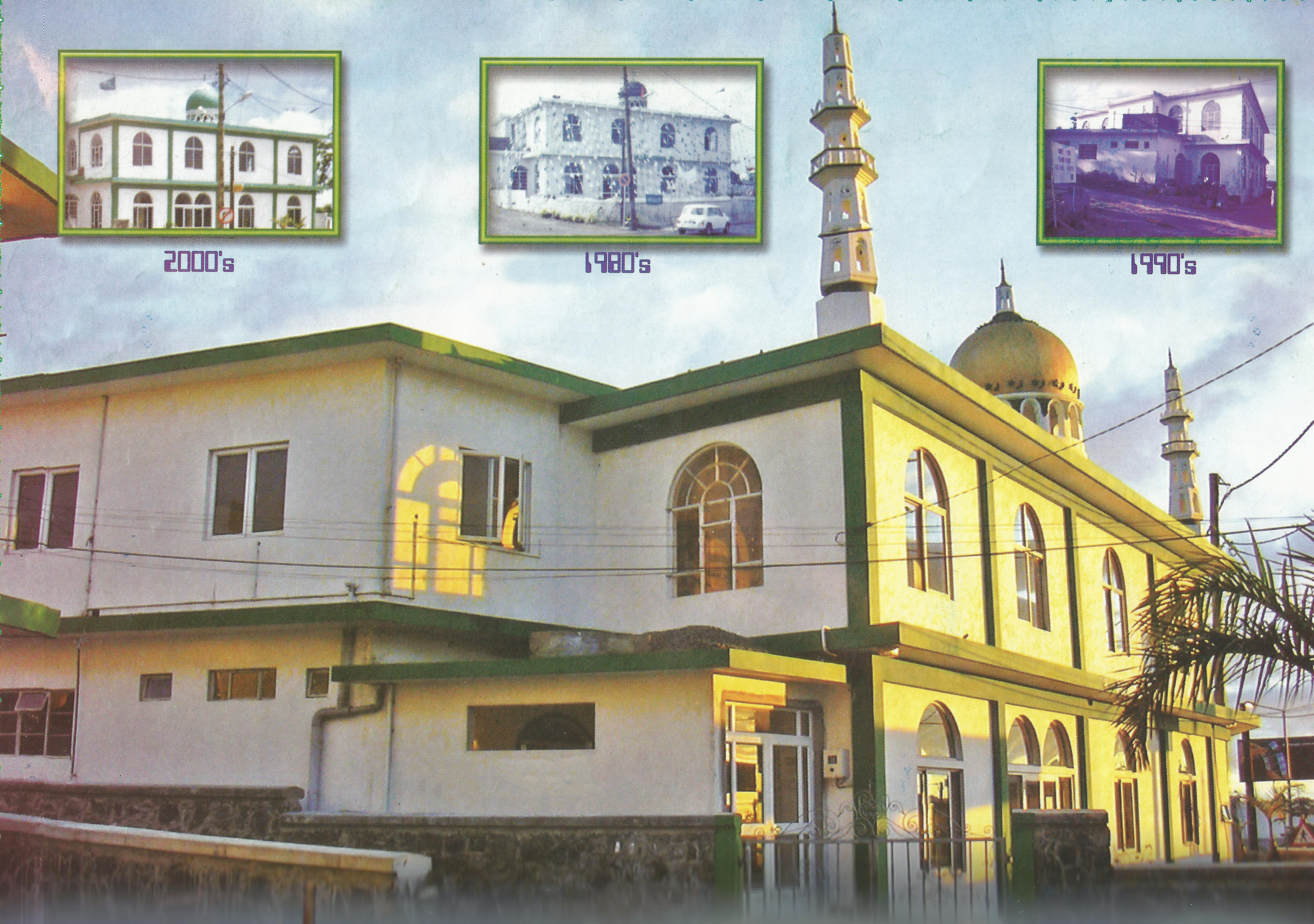
Ittefaq ul Muslemine Musjid

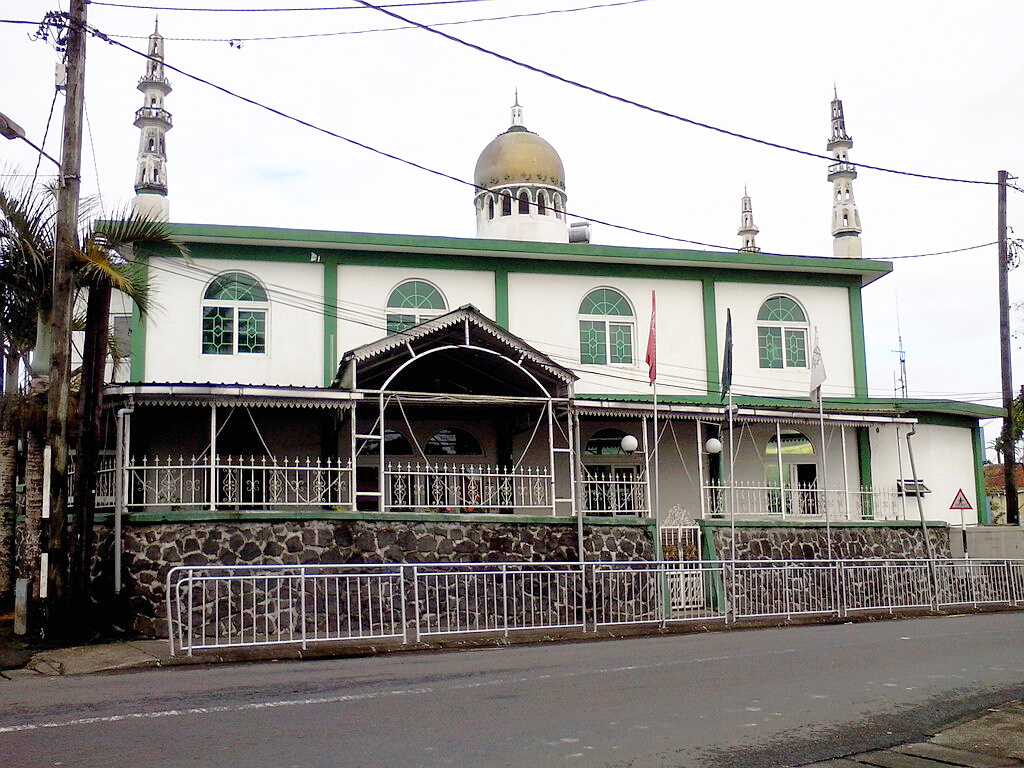
Ittefaq ul Muslemine Musjid

Valetta is known for its small lake which is a local attraction and it has a splendid view. Tourists occasionally wander at Valetta Lake.

== Future Developments ==
1. Providence Islamic Center. (Work in progress)
2. Winners Shopping Center. (Work in progress)
3. Complex Centers and some late night clubs.
4. Private Companies and factories.
5. A boost in houses by the Estate. (Completed)
6. Conventional Center at the junction of Providence Quartier Militaire.
