= Yousuf Mohamed =

Mauritian politician (1933–2022)

Yousuf Abdul Razack Mohamed, also known as Yousuf Mohamed (Gujarati: યુસુફ મોહમ્મદ; 1933-3 April 2022) was a Mauritian Senior Counsel and politician.

== Early life, family and education ==
Mohamed was the son of Indian born-Mauritian Minister Abdool Razack Mohamed with his second wife, Ghislaine Ducasse.

Mohamed studied in Bristol, UK before returning to Mauritius in 1961. He travelled to France in 1963 to study French Law at Faculté de Droit de Paris, returning to Mauritius by 1965 to start his legal career.

== Political career ==
Yousuf Mohamed was elected to the Legislative Council in 1967 in Constituency No.8 (Quartier-Militaire–Moka). He stood as a candidate at the 1976 general elections but was not elected. However he was nominated through the Best Loser System, and was appointed as the Minister of Labour and Industrial Relations until 1979. In 1979 he was appointed as Ambassador in Egypt. At the 1983 general elections he was elected to the Legislative Assembly as a candidate of the MSM-Labour-PMSD coalition and he served as Deputy Speaker until 1987.
