= Gaëtan Duval =

Mauritian politician (1930–1996)

Sir Gaëtan Duval QC
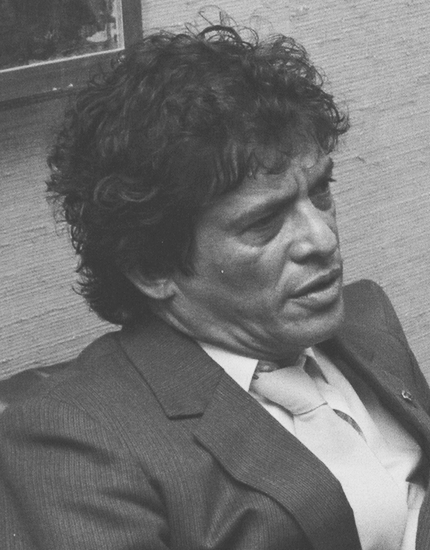
- Duval in 1983

Deputy Prime Minister of Mauritius
- In office 21 August 1983 – 11 December 1988
- Monarch: Elizabeth II
- Prime Minister: Anerood Jugnauth
- Governor General: Seewoosagur Ramgoolam; Veerasamy Ringadoo
- Preceded by: Harish Boodhoo
- Succeeded by: Satcam Boolell

Leader of the Opposition
- In office 11 June 1982 – 21 August 1983
- Monarch: Elizabeth II
- Prime Minister: Seewoosagur Ramgoolam
- Governor General: Dayendranath Burrenchobay
- Preceded by: Anerood Jugnauth
- Succeeded by: Paul Bérenger
- In office 23 December 1973 – 23 December 1976
- Monarch: Elizabeth II
- Prime Minister: Seewoosagur Ramgoolam
- Governor General: Raman Osman
- Preceded by: Sookdeo Bissoondoyal
- Succeeded by: Anerood Jugnauth
- In office 7 August 1967 – 23 December 1969
- Monarch: Elizabeth II
- Prime Minister: Seewoosagur Ramgoolam
- Governor General: John Shaw Rennie; Leonard Williams
- Preceded by: Office established
- Succeeded by: Sookdeo Bissoondoyal

Leader of the PMSD
- In office 1967 – 5 May 1996
- Preceded by: Jules Koenig
- Succeeded by: Maurice Allet

Personal details
- Born: 9 October 1930 Rose Hill, British Mauritius
- Died: 5 May 1996 (aged 65) Grand Gaube, Mauritius
- Party: PMSD; Parti Gaëtan Duval (PGD)
- Relations: Hervé Duval (brother)
- Children: Xavier; Richard
- Education: Lincoln's Inn

Sir Charles Gaëtan Duval QC (9 October 1930 – 5 May 1996) was a Mauritian barrister, statesman, and politician, who was the leader of the Parti Mauricien Social Démocrate (PMSD) political party. He was affectionately referred during his political career as "le roi créole".

== Early life and education ==
Duval was born in Rose Hill on 9 October 1930 in an upper middle-class Creole family of mixed ancestry. His father Charles was a civil servant and his mother Rosina Henrisson (1902-1989) was a housewife. In 1933, when Gaëtan was only 3 years old, his father died and his uncle Raoul raised him up. The young Duval attended Saint-Enfant-Jésus RCA primary school and the Royal College of Curepipe. He then travelled abroad to study law at Lincoln's Inn (UK) and at the Faculty of Law of (Paris). Lastly, he joined the Mauritian Bar to practice as a barrister and became known during high profile cases.

== Political career ==
After studying law in the UK and France, he became actively involved in politics in Mauritius within Jules Koenig's party Ralliement Mauricien, which became known as Parti Mauricien in 1963, and eventually as the "PMSD" in 1965. During the March 1959 General Elections, the Ralliement Mauricien candidate Gaëtan Duval was defeated by Labour candidate Romricky Ramsamy in Constituency No. 29 Curepipe. But after contesting these results in Supreme Court on the basis that Ramsamy had included his nickname Narain in his registration, Chief Judge Francis Herchenroder ruled in favour of Koenig's party and Ramsamy was disqualified. At the January 1960 by-elections, Gaëtan Duval was elected to the Legislative Council. This party advocated a continued association with the United Kingdom, whilst the Independence Party of Ramgoolam-Bissoondoyal-Mohamed demanded unconditional independence of the country. By 1965, Koenig retired from politics and Duval became the leader of the PMSD, which was a conservative movement backed by wealthy white Franco-Mauritian oligarchs as well as most of the creole community of Roman Catholic faith. For a few years in the 1950s, Duval's party even received the support of the Muslims, but this ended when Abdool Razack Mohamed left the PMSD to form the new CAM in 1959.

Minority Tamil groups continued to support the PMSD. Duval's electorate feared Hindu hegemony in an independent Mauritius and an intense violent hate campaign before and after the 1967 general elections led to the 1965 Mauritius race riots, 1967 Mauritius riots, and 1968 Mauritian riots. Duval's and Mohamed's anti-Hindu slogans malbar nous pa oulé (a Creole term meaning "We don't want Hindus") or envelopé nous pa oulé (meaning "We don't want to be wrapped in saris or dhotis like Indians") were heavily criticised. However, his popularity among the creole community led to him becoming known as Le Roi Creole (meaning King of the Creoles in the Creole language).

Prior to the 1967 elections, Gaëtan Duval's PMSD lodged a civil action in the Supreme Court of Mauritius to contest Rodriguans' inability to vote at general elections, especially given that the principle of universal suffrage was already in practice on mainland Mauritius since 1959. The Supreme Court ruled in Duval's favour. This enabled the inhabitants of Rodrigues to vote for the first time in August 1967.

Following his defeat at the 1967 elections, Duval became Leader of the Opposition. However, his PMSD gradually split into rival factions, the main one being the Union Démocratique Mauricienne (UDM) formed by Guy Ollivry & Maurice Lesage within the Opposition in Parliament. By December 1969, Bissoondoyal's IFB left the PTr-IFB-CAM government to join the Opposition. Duval's reduced PMSD replaced the IFB within the ruling government in 1969 and several PMSD parliamentarians served as ministers within Ramgoolam's cabinet. However, Gaetan Duval was dismissed as cabinet minister in 1973 and served as Leader of the Opposition again until 1976. In the 1976 general elections, PMSD won only 7 seats, and Gaetan Duval lost his seat and remained out of the legislative assembly until 1983. His party won only 2 seats in the 1982 elections, so he served from 1982 to 1983 for a last time as Leader of the Opposition.

Although it was a significant political party in Mauritius in the 1970s, Duval's PMSD lost much of its electorate in the 1980s to the radical leftist Mauritian Militant Movement party. Gaëtan Duval nevertheless remained an enigmatic political personality, even though his party had less than 5 MPs for the period between 1982 and 1996.

He made an electoral arrangement with then prime minister Jugnauth in the 1983 general elections and later joined the government, the alliance having been victorious. He became Minister of Tourism and later Deputy Prime Minister of Mauritius until 1988. He was lastly elected MP at the 1995 elections and remained as such until his death.

In the 1990s, Gaetan's disagreement with his son Xavier-Luc Duval became public, especially regarding the leadership and symbol of the PMSD. His son, Xavier-Luc, revealed to the population that he was ashamed of bearing the surname of Duval due to the immoral lifestyle of his father. He nevertheless won his case in the Supreme Court. The factional struggles within PMSD caused a split into 3 parties. Gaëtan created his new party called Parti Gaëtan Duval, whilst Xavier's faction formed a new party called Parti Mauricien Xavier Duval (PMXD). The original PMSD, though reduced, was led by Maurice Allet. Gaëtan was not on good terms with his son at the time of his death. Many years after Gaëtan's death, the PMSD was reunited in 2008, when Xavier and his party agreed to dissolve the PMXD and integrate back into the PMSD.

== Personal life ==
Duval was the father of 2 sons, Xavier-Luc Duval (his biological child) and Richard Duval (whom he adopted at birth). Xavier-Luc trained as an accountant before becoming a politician and serving as minister in various portfolios. Richard worked as a stable hand before starting his career in the Mauritian Parliament. Gaetan's grandson Adrien, who is Xavier's son, also served for one term in the National Assembly.

Gaëtan Duval was also publicly known to be bisexual.

== Controversies ==
In 1989, two ex-prisoners Paul Sarah and Moorgesh Shummoogum alleged in a statement to the police that in 1971, Sir Gaetan Duval had planned and commandeered the murder of Azor Adelaide at his Grand-Gaube bungalow. They made the police statement at the police station located outside then Prime Minister Sir Aneerood Jugnauth's residence at La Caverne, Vacoas. Paul Sarah, Moorgesh Shummoogum, Ignace Bahloo, and André Celestin had already served prison sentences for their involvement in the 1971 murder. During the afternoon of 23 June 1989, Sir Gaetan Duval landed at Plaisance Airport in Mauritius from Madagascar and was questioned by Superintendent of Police Reesaul of the Anti Drug and Smuggling Unit (ADSU). Assistant Commissioner of Police (ACP) Cyril Morvan was also travelling on the same flight. Sir Gaëtan Duval was escorted to Line Barracks in Port Louis where he was arrested on murder charges. He was questioned in the presence of his lawyer Kader Bhayat before being detained at the barracks of Special Mobile Force in Vacoas. The arrest led to various protests by Gaetan Duval's supporters, which sometimes turned violent. However, after a lengthy trial, Sir Gaëtan Duval was acquitted of all murder charges.

== Recognition ==
In recognition of his political and judicial career, France elevated him to the rank of Commandeur de la Légion d'Honneur in 1973. Later, he was knighted by Queen Elizabeth II in the 1981 New Year Honours. In Mauritius, several facilities bear his name, including the hotel school of Ebène and the stadium of the municipality of Rose Hill. He is also the face of the Rs. 1,000 bank note and featured on a postage stamp issued by Mauritius Post.

Several books have been written about Gaëtan Duval including 'Le droit à l’excès' and 'L’incarné du voyage' by Alain Gordon-Gentil. In 2015, the documentary "Gaëtan Duval, Une Vie" was released by La Compagnie Des Autres in Mauritius.

Following Gaëtan Duval's death in 1996, his son Xavier has made it an annual tradition to host an open house at Gaëtan's bungalow located at Melville, Grand Gaube on the coast of Mauritius. This is despite the legal dispute dating back to the 1990s over the ownership of the land, whereby Ashki Persand (of Société Le Grand-Gaube) claims that Gaetan Duval and his two sons had wrongly pretended to own the plots of land where the bungalow is located.
