= Satcam Boolell =

Mauritian politician (1920–2006)

Sir Satcam Boolell GCSK QC
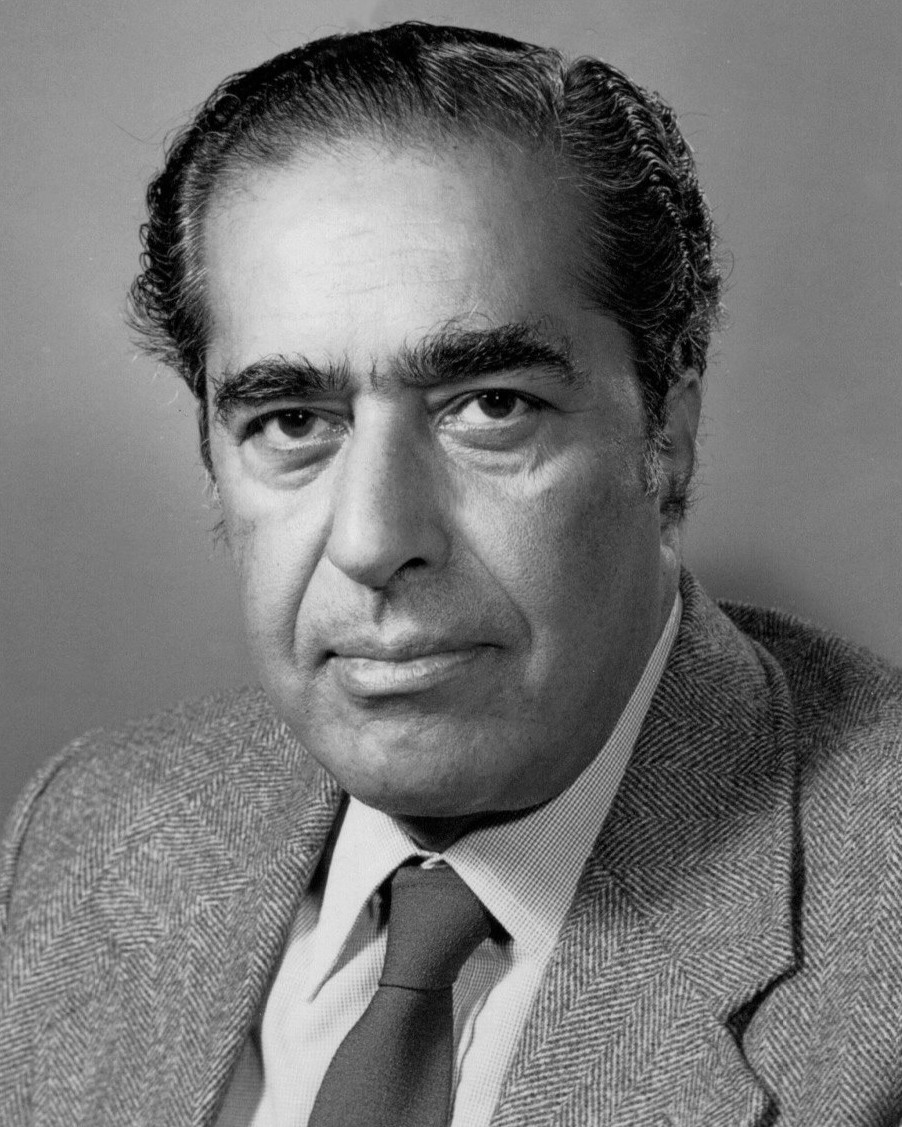
- Boolell in 1979

Deputy Prime Minister of Mauritius
- In office 15 August 1988 – 18 August 1990
- Monarch: Elizabeth II
- Governor General: Veerasamy Ringadoo
- Prime Minister: Anerood Jugnauth
- Preceded by: Gaëtan Duval
- Succeeded by: Prem Nababsing

High Commissioner of Mauritius to the United Kingdom
- In office 12 May 1996 – 2001
- Nominated by: Navin Ramgoolam
- Succeeded by
Ministerial offices
Attorney-General of Mauritius Minister of Justice
In office 4 September 1987 – 18 August 1990
Prime Minister	Anerood Jugnauth
Preceded by	Gaëtan Duval (Attorney-General); Anerood Jugnauth (Justice)
Succeeded by	Jayen Cuttaree
Minister of External Affairs and Emigration
In office 8 August 1986 – 18 August 1990
Prime Minister	Anerood Jugnauth
Preceded by	Madan Dulloo
Succeeded by	Madan Dulloo
Minister of Agriculture, Natural Resources and the Environment (Note: Boolell's portfolio was known as: Agriculture and Natural Resources (1959–1969); Agriculture and Natural Resources and Cooeprative Development (1969–1971); Agriculture and Natural Resources (1971–1974))
In office 12 March 1968 – 15 June 1982
Prime Minister	Seewoosagur Ramgoolam
Preceded by	Veerasamy Ringadoo
Succeeded by	Kishore Deerpalsing (Agriculture, Fisheries and Natural Resources)
In office 1959–1967
Prime Minister	Seewoosagur Ramgoolam
Succeeded by	Veerasamy Ringadoo
Minister of Education and Cultural Affairs
In office 1967 – 12 March 1968
Prime Minister	Seewoosagur Ramgoolam
Succeeded by	Rajmohusing Jomadar
Parliamentary offices
Member of Parliament; for Montagne Blanche and Grand River South East
In office 21 August 1983 – 6 August 1991
Preceded by	Azize Asgarally
Succeeded by	Ramduth Jaddoo
In office August 1967 – 17 December 1981
Preceded by	Constituency established
Succeeded by	Azize Asgarally
Member of Parliament; for Montagne Blanche
In office 9 March 1959 – August 1967
Preceded by	Constituency established
Succeeded by	Constituency abolished
Member of the Legislative Council; for Moka and Flacq
In office August 1953 – March 1959
Preceded by	Bhagwan Gujadhur
Succeeded by	Constituency abolished

Personal details
- Born: 11 September 1920 New Grove, British Mauritius
- Died: 23 March 2006 (aged 85) Curepipe, Mauritius
- Party: Labour Party (from 1955); Independent Forward Bloc (until 1955); Mouvement Patriotique Mauricien (1982)
- Occupation: Lawyer

Sir Satcam Boolell GCSK QC (11 September 1920 – 23 March 2006) was a Mauritian politician who served as member of the Legislative Assembly in Mauritius. He died on 23 March 2006, in Curepipe. He was also known as "Somduth" by his peers and family members.

== Early life and education ==
Born in 1920 on the Gros Billot sugar estate (between New Grove and GrosBois in Grand Port, to Sahadewoo Boolell and Cossilah Choony, Satcam Boolell grew up with five siblings. In the mid-1800s his grandfather had migrated from the village of Singarmau located in Jaunpore, now a district of Uttar Pradesh, India. His father Sahadewoo (born in 1879 and died in 1940 in New Grove, Mauritius) worked as a policeman and supplemented his income as a trader and supervisor at the Dookhee Gungah property where he grew vegetables and traded nursery plants. Sahadewoo Boolell joined the Arya Samaj Socio-Cultural Group where his son Satcam remained active throughout his life.

Boolell completed his primary school education at Rose Belle Government School and completed his secondary school education through private tuitions in Mauritius. In 1938 he started his teaching career as a volunteer before securing a teaching position at Plaine des Papayes Government School. Subsequently he became a teacher at Cassis Government School and later at Aryan Vedic School in Vacoas. From 1943 to 1947 he worked in the Civil Service at the Treasury Department and Department of Agriculture. In 1948 he travelled to England to start his tertiary education at the London School of Economics. After graduating with a law degree he was called to the bar at the Lincoln's Inn in 1952, before returning to Mauritius.

== Family ==
Satcam Boolell married Premila Indurjeet in Port Louis in 1946 and they had three children: Arvin, Satyajit (Ajit) and Mira. Premila Boolell died in 1986 and later Satcam married Myrtha Poblete, a Polish national. Their son Arvin Boolell is an active politician. His son Satyajit Boolell was appointed Director of Public Prosecutions (DPP) in February 2009. His nephews Anil Gayan and Satish Boolell have also been active politicians in Mauritius. Satcam's daughter Mira is married to Sushil Khushiram who has been Minister of Industry and is a bank executive. His nephew Prakash Boolell was a lawyer who was candidate at the 1976 General Elections. Satcam's sister was married to Somdath Bhuckory, a lawyer, writer and former Town Clerk of Port Louis. Satcam's elder brother Boomitre Boolell died in July 2022 at the age of 104.

== Political career ==
During colonial times preceding 1968 he was elected to the Legislative Council of British Mauritius following the 1953 elections as an independent candidate. Satcam Boolell then joined Sookdeo Bissoondoyal's party the Independent Forward Bloc (IFB) which had dissociated itself from the Labour Party (Mauritius) which had been taken over by a group of Hindu intellectuals (led by Seewoosagur Ramgoolam) who collaborated with the British governor of the colonial British Mauritius. After being elected at the 1959 elections he became Minister of Agriculture in the colonial government of Mauritius. At the general elections of 7 August 1967 he became part of the new cabinet of ministers led by Seewoosagur Ramgoolam. From 1967 to 1968 he was Minister of Education.

Following the 12 March 1968 accession of Mauritius to Independence he became Minister of Agriculture from 1968 to 1974. During this period he participated in the negotiations for the Sugar Protocol in Yaoundé and Lomé which were critical for the survival of the sugar industry. At the 1982 elections he was defeated but in 1983 Satcam Boolell was elected to Parliament. Thus in the MSM-PMSD-Labour cabinet led by Anerood Jugnauth he became Minister of Economy and Planning until Friday 10 February 1984 when he was sacked by PM Jugnauth for breaking Cabinet ranks by dealing directly with trade unions without consulting with partners Boodhoo, Duval or Jugnauth. From 1986 to 1990 he served as Deputy Prime Minister. Minister of Foreign Affairs, and Minister of Justice in various governments led by Anerood Jugnauth. In August 1990 Satcam Boolell was one of the three ministers who were dismissed from the ruling government after refusing to support the project to make the island a republic. The other two ministers who were sacked were Vishnu Lutchmeenaraidoo and Dineshwar Ramjuttun.

Following the electoral defeat of 1982 Sir Satcam Boolell was dismissed from the Labour Party, and he thus formed a new party Mouvement Patriotique Mauricien (MPM) before returning to the Labour Party in 1983. He was president of the Labour Party (Mauritius) from 1984 to 1991. Satcam Boolell was a candidate of Labour Party in Constituency No. 10 - Montagne Blanche and Grand River South East at the General Elections held on 15 September 1991. However he was defeated and did not take part in subsequent elections. Before retiring he was High Commissioner of Mauritius in London until 2000.

He is credited for having led innovations at the Agricultural Marketing Board and facilitated agricultural diversification. Satcam Boolell also supported the Young Farmers Club, an initiative of Dr Clovis Vellin in the 1960s and 1970s to encourage small-scale and hobby farming in Mauritius.

== Publications ==
Satcam Boolell published three books "Mauritius Through the Looking Glass: A Collection of Short Stories", "For the love of my country" and "Untold Stories et Reminiscences of travels abroad". He also wrote opinion papers which were published in Mauritian newspapers such as Mauritius Times and L'Express.

In the 1970s Satcam Boolell founded and sponsored the Mauritian newspaper The Nation which was managed by journalists Jugdish Joypaul et Subash Gobine.

== Recognition ==
In December 1976 Satcam Boolell was knighted. Satcam Boolell was elevated to the rank of Grand Officer of the Order of the Star and Key of Indian Ocean (G.O.S.K.) in 1999. Subsequently in 2006 he was post-humously elevated to the rank of Grand Commander of the Order of the Star and Key of Indian Ocean (G.C.S.K.). A statue of Satcam Boolell has been erected at Place d'Armes in Port Louis in recognition of his contribution to the development of agriculture.
