= Sookdeo Bissoondoyal =

Mauritian politician (1908-1977)

Sookdeo Bissoondoyal MP

3rd Leader of the Opposition (Mauritius)
- In office 23 December 1974 – 23 December 1976
- Prime Minister: Seewoosagur Ramgoolam
- Preceded by: Maurice Lesage
- Succeeded by: Aneerood Jugnauth

Member of Legislative Assembly
- In office 7 August 1967 – 20 December 1976
- Prime Minister: Seewoosagur Ramgoolam

Minister of the Local Government and Cooperatives
- In office 21 October 1963 – 7 August 1967
- Prime Minister: Seewoosagur Ramgoolam (Chief Minister)

Member of Legislative Council
- In office 9 March 1959 – 21 October 1963
- Prime Minister: Seewoosagur Ramgoolam (Chief Minister 1961 onwards)

Member of the Legislative Council
- In office 26 August 1953 – 9 March 1959

Member of Legislative Council
- In office 9 August 1948 – 26 August 1953

Personal details
- Born: 25 December 1908 British Mauritius
- Died: 18 August 1977 (aged 68) Souillac, Mauritius
- Party: Independent Forward Bloc (IFB)
- Occupation: Teacher

Sookdeo Bissoondoyal (25 December 1908 – 18 August 1977) was a Mauritian politician and one of the leading figures in the nation's independence movement.

== Early life ==
Sookdeo Bissoondoyal was born in Tyack, Rivière des Anguilles in 1908. He had two brothers Basdeo and Soogrim.

== Education and career ==
At the Young Men's Hindu Aided Primary School (Port Louis) he acquired his primary education. He passed his teacher's examination and worked as primary school teacher from 1923 to 1945.

== Political career ==
In 1946, Sookdeo Bissoondoyal left the teaching profession to join his elder brother Basdeo's movement Jan Andolan. Sookdeo became active in politics and was elected to the Legislative Council in the Grand Port-Savanne constituency in the August 1948 elections. He was re-elected in 1953 within the same constituency.

On 13 April 1958 he founded the Independent Forward Bloc (IFB) political party. He was re-elected in the Rose-Belle Constituency No.21 in the 1959 elections at a time when there were 40 constituencies, which saw the IFB win six seats. Following the elections, Bissoondoyal was appointed Minister of Local Government and Cooperative Movements. He was re-elected for the fourth consecutive time in the same Rose-Belle Constituency No.21 in the 1963 elections, whilst the IFB increased its representation to seven seats.

In 1965 Sookdeo Bissoondoyal attended the Constitutional Conference in London (also known as 1965 Lancaster Conference) in preparation for the independence of Mauritius. The 1967 elections saw the IFB run as part of the Independence Party (Mauritius) (IP) which became a coalition of the Labour Party and the Muslim Committee of Action. The IP alliance won the August 1967 elections, with Bissoondoyal re-elected in the Vieux Grand Port & Rose-Belle Constituency No.11, and subsequently becoming Minister of Cooperatives. The 1967 elections would be the fifth and last time for Sookdeo to be elected to the Legislative Council. He resigned from the Council of Ministers on 21 March 1969 due to a disagreement on some issues, including the postponement of the 1972 general elections by the Prime Minister Seewoosagur Ramgoolam. In 1974 Bissoondoyal became Leader of the Opposition. In 1976, he was candidate at the general elections in Constituency No.11 (Vieux Grand Port and Rose Belle) but was not elected, as he was defeated by rivals Gungoosingh, Basant Rai and Doongoor of Independence Party (Mauritius). In the aftermath of the 1976 defeat Sookdeo died within a year and his party IFB did not participate in any subsequent elections.

== Bibliography ==
Sookdeo Bissoondoyal wrote the book "A Concise History of Mauritius" which was published for the first time in 1965 by Bharativa Vidya Bhavan. The book "Sookdeo Bissoondoyal, Life and Times" was written by R. Jeetah and published in 1989 and subsequent years.

== Legacy ==
In honour of Sookdeo Bissoondoyal the Port Louis municipal council renamed Place d'Armes as Place Sookdeo Bissoondoyal where his statue has been erected. The statue faces that of his brother Basdeo. The secondary state schoolSookdeo Bissoondoyal State College in Rose-Belle is also named after him. On 3 April 1987 the Sookdeo Bissoondoyal Memorial Museum (located on the main road in the village of Tyack, Rivière des Anguilles) was inaugurated. In 1998 the Bank of Mauritius issued new 500 Rupees bank notes featuring a portrait of Sookdeo Bissoondoyal on the obverse face.
