= 1963 Mauritian general election =

General elections were held in Mauritius on 21 October 1963. The result was a victory for the Labour Party, which won 19 of the 40 seats.

== Results ==
Party	Seats	+/–
Labour Party	19	–5
Parti Mauricien Social Démocrate	8	+5
Independent Forward Bloc	7	+1
Muslim Committee of Action	4	–1
Independents	2	0
Total	40	0
Source: Electoral Commission, African Elections Database
