= 1959 Mauritian general election =

General elections were held in Mauritius on 9 March 1959. The result was a victory for the Labour Party, which won 24 of the 40 seats. They were the first elections in Mauritius to be held with universal suffrage.

== Electoral system ==
The Mauritius (Constitution) Order in Council 1958 provided for a Legislative Council with 40 members elected from single-member constituencies. Voters had to be aged 21 or over. A total of 208,684 people were registered to vote, of which 122,310 were non-Muslim Indo-Mauritians, 32,866 were Muslim Indo-Mauritians, 50,381 were general population and 3,127 were Sino-Mauritians.

== Campaign ==
A total of 159 candidates contested the elections, with all 40 constituencies having at least two candidates.

== Results ==
Voter turnout was 91.3%, ranging from 83.6% in the Stanley constituency to 95.6% in Moka.

Party	Votes	%	Seats	+/–
Labour Party			24	+9
Independent Forward Bloc			6	New
Muslim Committee of Action			5	New
Parti Mauricien Social Démocrate			3	New
Independents			2	–2
Total			40	+9
Registered voters/turnout	208,684	–		
Source: Electoral Commission, African Elections Database

== Aftermath ==
Following the elections, petitions were submitted to overturn the results in Curepipe, Piton, Port Louis Maritime, Riviere des Anguilles and Vieux Grant Port constituencies. The petitions for Piton, Port Louis Maritime and Vieux Grant Port were withdrawn, but the Supreme Court annulled the results of the Curepipe and Riviere des Anguilles votes.
