= Independence Party (Mauritius) =

Political party

The Independence Party was the name of a coalition of 3 major political parties on the island of Mauritius in the 1960s and 1970s. It was also commonly known as Parti de L'indépendance.

It was formed in 1966 to unite the Labour Party (Mauritius), Independent Forward Bloc (IFB) and Comité d'Action Musulman (CAM) at the time when the island nation was a colony of Great Britain.

== History ==
The Independence Party was founded soon after a delegation of Mauritian representatives returned to Mauritius following the 1965 Lancaster Conference which was held in England. The main objective of forming an alliance of the 3 political parties (Labour, IFB and CAM) was to represent the voters who supported independence from colonial power Great Britain which had administered the island since 1810. General elections were scheduled to occur in August 1967 to formally determine whether locals wanted a separation from United Kingdom. Since 1960 the British administration had started discussions with local representatives regarding their departure from the colony as it withdrew its military regiment from the island in the same year. The All Mauritius Hindu Congress (AMHC) did not form part of the Independence Party although it had been influential in prior elections such as in 1963. By 1969 the IFB had left the ruling coalition that had made up the original Independence Party. However the reduced alliance of the Labour Party and CAM kept using the name "Independence Party" for several years including the 1976 General Elections.

== Electoral victory ==
The Independence Party won the 1967 General elections after their main rival anti-Independence Parti Mauricien Social Démocrate (PMSD) lost heavily. Indeed the Labour-IFB-CAM alliance secured 54.7% of votes compared to 43.5% of votes for its rival PMSD. It formed a Cabinet under Prime Minister Sir Seewoosagur Ramgoolam after securing 43 seats out of a total of 70. However whilst in office disagreements soon developed among the partners of the coalition and IFB gradually lost its influence. At the 1970 by-elections in Constituency No.5 the coalition lost its seat to a brand new party MMM's candidate. The 1970 by-elections had been triggered by the untimely death of IFB Attorney General Lall Jugnauth. Subsequently the 1972 general elections were cancelled due to political unrest. Then at the 1976 elections the Independence Party was made up of Labour Party and CAM only as IFB had opted out of the coalition.

== Ideology ==
The Independence Party of Mauritius was a centre-left party. It practised a socialist way of government whilst supporting the growth of employment through private enterprise which was then dominated by the sugar industry. It later started to actively promote the growth of the tourism industry. In government the priorities of the Independence Party were education of the masses, control of the high population growth, reduction of unemployment, improvement of healthcare, water and sanitation.

The Independence Party was only partially economically liberal especially given the predominance of private ownership of the mills and plantations of the sugar industry, and advocated limited government intervention in the economy. It supported the creation of a welfare state.

The party attempted to be social liberal on some social issues and practised censorship of mass media.

== Political support ==
During its existence the Independence Party had strong support of the majority of Hindu voters as well as Muslim voters. It was not popular with General Population (mixed ancestry Creole, Chinese and Whites) voters who were predominantly Catholic and Anglican. Gradually the influence of Hindu-centered IFB within the alliance withered during the first term in office. By the end of that term the leader of Labour Party already started to work closely with what used to be his ideological rival Gaëtan Duval at PMSD, so much so that they collaborated to amend the Constitution in 1972 to cancel the planned general elections.

== Organisation ==
The coalition of parties was active during the electoral campaign. Once the 1967 elections were over the constituent parties reverted to their individual structures and original way of operating.

== Leadership ==
The Independence Party alliance was led by Labour leader Sir Seewoosagur Ramgoolam, IFB leader Sookdeo Bissoondoyal and CAM leader Abdool Razack Mohamed.
