= Independent Forward Bloc =

Political party in Mauritius

- Founder: Sookdeo Bissoondoyal
- Founded: 13 April 1958
- Ideology: Socialism; Indo-Mauritian interests Cultural conservatism
- National affiliation: Independence Party

The Independent Forward Bloc (IFB) was a political party in Mauritius.

== History ==
The Independent Forward Bloc (IFB) party was founded by Sookdeo Bissoondoyal on 13 April 1958. In the 1930s, the movement Jan Andolan had been founded by Sookdeo's elder brother Basdeo Bissoondoyal in order to educate the rural mass and was instrumental in the record high participation of working-class people at the 1948 Legislative Council general elections which were ground-breaking for being the first ever application of the principle of universal suffrage in Mauritius. To fully participate in the Jan Andolan's struggle for social justice Sookdeo Bissoondoyal resigned from the Civil Service in 1946 after 22 years of service as a school teacher. With the advent of the new political party IFB officially progressed the Jan Andolan's mission on the political front. IFB was an important partner in the coalition of 3 major parties that formed part of the Independence Party (Mauritius) which won the 1967 General Elections and paved the way to official independence from British colonial rule in 1968.

Unpaid volunteers supported the IFB, in a manner similar to its predecessor the Jan Andolan movement. It also received the support of Dr Charles Edgar Millien, who was also advocating for democracy through his newspaper L'Oeuvre. In 1946 a public meeting held by Guy Rozemont and Sookdeo Bissoondoyal was attended by a massive crowd in Port Louis at the Jardin de la Compagnie. By 1947 the new Constitution had been enacted which led to the first exercise of universal suffrage in 1948. During the electoral campaign of 1948 Sookdeo Bissoondoyal canvassed the Port Louis electorate to vote for Guy Rozemont and Charles Edgar Millien who were voted to the Legislative Council.

== Electoral success ==
Prior to the formation of IFB its founder Sookdeo Bissoondoyal had been elected to Legislative Council in 1948 and 1953. At the 1959 elections the IFB secured 6 out of 40 seats in the Legislative Council. At the 1963 elections the IFB secured 7 out of 40 seats in the Legislative Council. Leading up to the 1967 elections the IFB joined the pro-independence coalition which became known as Independence Party and IFB secured 11 out of 62 seats in the Legislative Council. Although the IFB was part of the ruling 1967 coalition, by 1969 it had become an opposition party, alongside Union Démocratique Mauricienne (UDM) in the Legislative Assembly following disagreements between leaders of Parti Travailliste (PTr), CAM and IFB. The death of IFB member of parliament and former Attorney General Lall Jugnauth in August 1970 triggered the 21 September 1970 by-elections in Constituency No.5 (Pamplemousses-Triolet) which resulted in the election of the first ever MMM parliamentarian Dev Virahsawmy. IFB's leader Sookdeo Bissoondoyal was Opposition Leader from 1971 to 1976. During the campaign leading to the 1976 elections the IFB had opted to stay out of the Independence Party where Labour Party and CAM remained. Soon after the December 1976 elections the PMSD joined the IP coalition to remain in power until 1982, although the MMM had won most of the seats without forming any alliances with rival parties. However no IFB candidate was elected at the 1976 elections.
