= Mauritius (1968–1992) =

Monarchy of Mauritius with Elizabeth II as head of state

Coordinates: 20.2°S 57.5°E

- 1968–1992
- Flag Coat of arms
- Motto: Stella Clavisque Maris Indici (Latin) "Star and Key of the Indian Ocean"
- Anthem: "Motherland"
- Capital: Port Louis
- Common languages: Mauritian Creole; French; English; Rodriguan Creole
- Government: Constitutional monarchy
- Queen
  - 1968–1992: Elizabeth II
- Governor-General
  - 1968 (first): John Shaw Rennie
  - 1986–1992 (last): Veerasamy Ringadoo
- Prime Minister
  - 1968–1982: Seewoosagur Ramgoolam
  - 1982–1992: Anerood Jugnauth
- History
  - Independence: 12 March 1968
  - Republic proclaimed: 12 March 1992
- Currency: Mauritian rupee
- Calling code: +230
- ISO 3166 code: MU
Preceded by	Succeeded by
British Mauritius	Republic of Mauritius
- Today part of: Mauritius

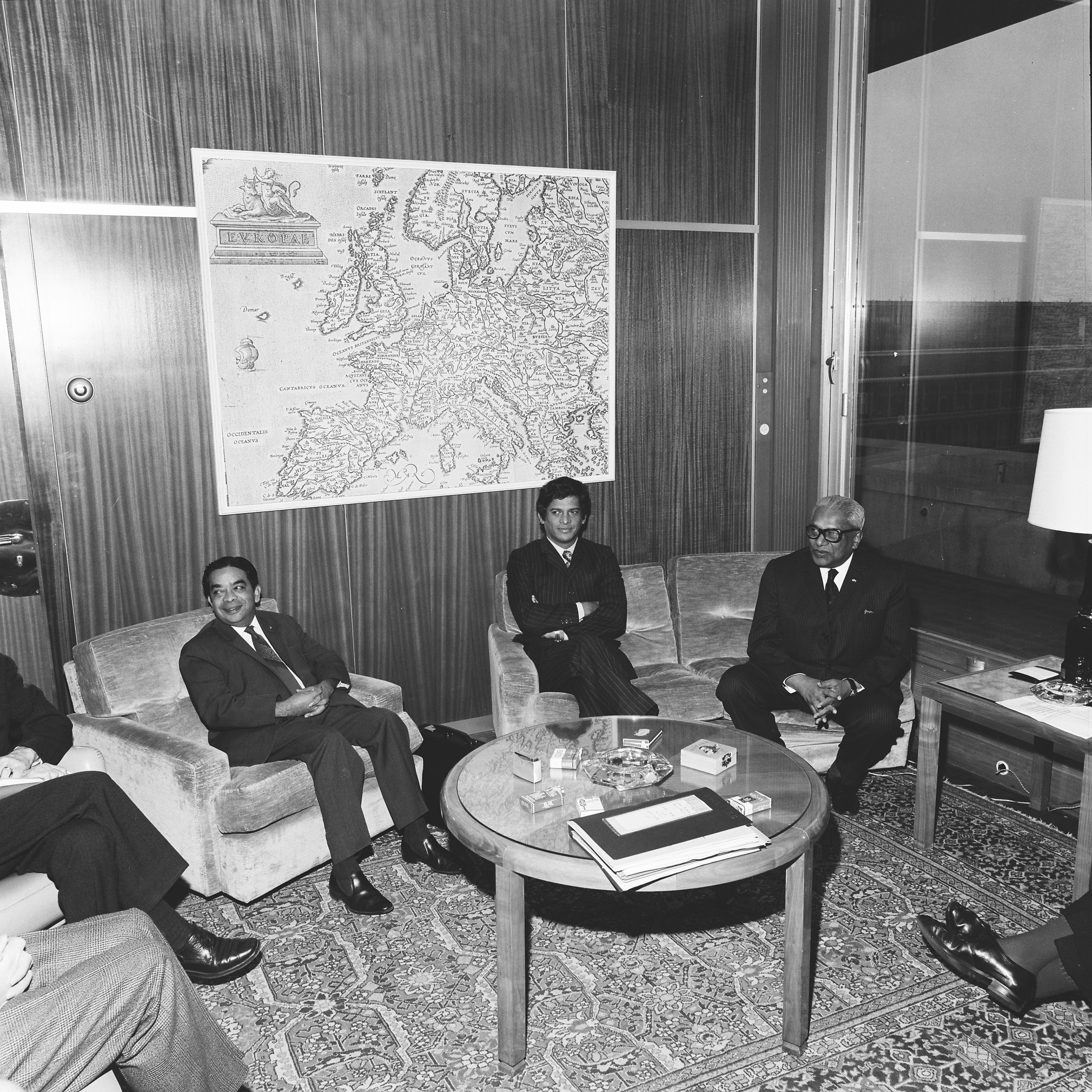
Delegation from Mauritius to the Commission of the European Communities in Brussels, 1970

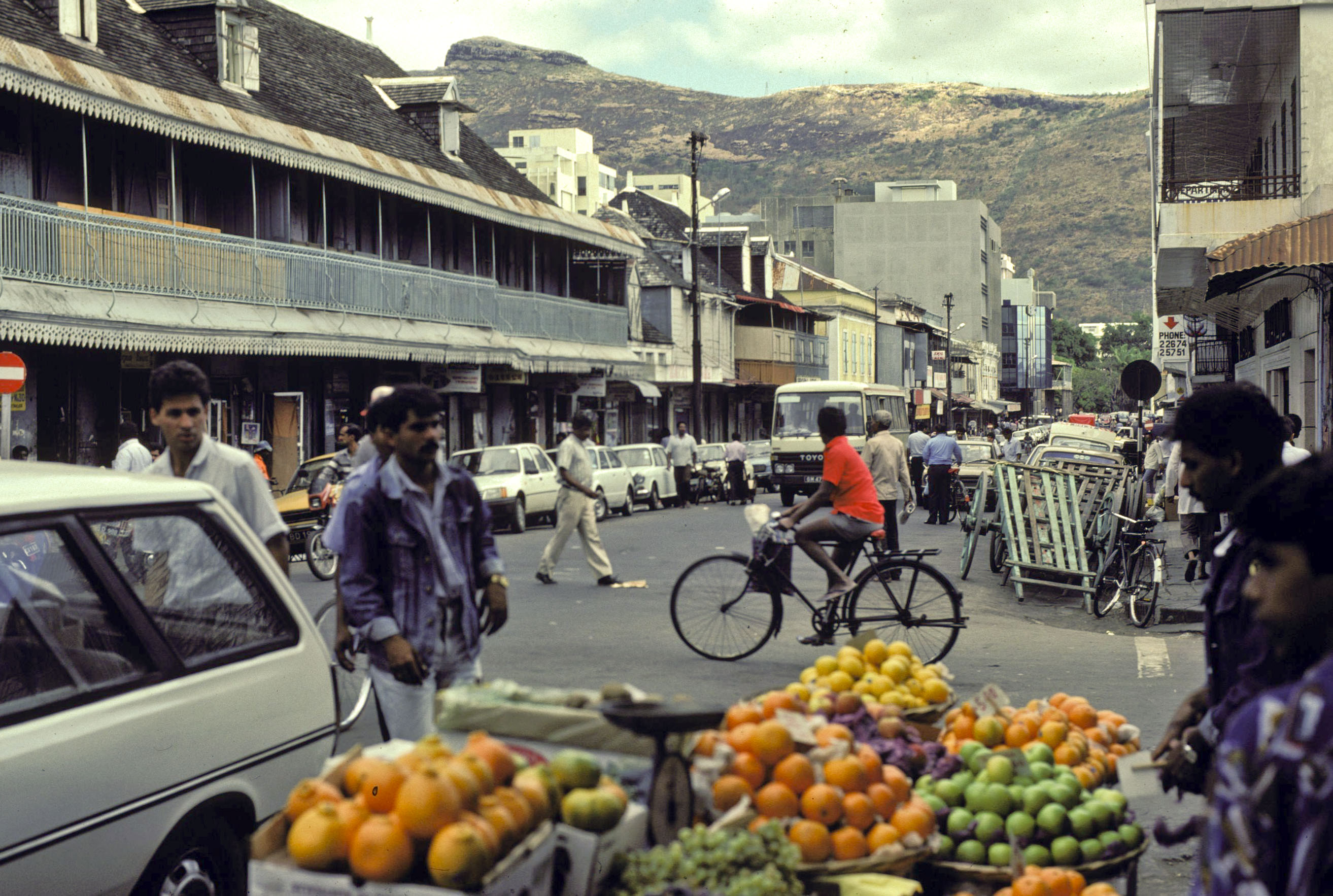
Mauritius street scene, 1989

Between independence in 1968 and becoming a republic in 1992, Mauritius was an independent sovereign state that shared its head of state with the United Kingdom and other states headed by Elizabeth II.

In 1968, the United Kingdom's Mauritius Independence Act 1968 granted independence to the British Crown Colony of Mauritius. The British monarch, Elizabeth II, remained head of state as Queen of Mauritius, as well as being Queen of the United Kingdom and the other Commonwealth realms. The monarch's constitutional roles in Mauritius were mostly delegated to the Governor-General of Mauritius.

Queen's Personal Mauritian Flag

Elizabeth II visited Mauritius 24–26 March 1972.

In 1975, a series of student protests turned violent.

The Republic of Mauritius was proclaimed on 12 March 1992. Following the abolition of the monarchy, the last Governor General of Mauritius, Sir Veerasamy Ringadoo became the first President of Mauritius.

== Governors-General of Mauritius ==
- John Shaw Rennie (12 March – 27 August 1968)
- Michel Rivalland (27 August – 3 September 1968)
- Leonard Williams (3 September 1968 – 27 December 1972)
- Raman Osman (27 December 1972 – 31 October 1977)
- Henry Garrioch (31 October 1977 – 26 April 1979)
- Dayendranath Burrenchobay (26 April 1979 – 28 December 1983)
- Seewoosagur Ramgoolam (28 December 1983 – 15 December 1985)
- Cassam Moollan (15 December 1985 – 17 January 1986) (acting)
- Veerasamy Ringadoo (17 January 1986 – 12 March 1992)

Seewoosagur Ramgoolam and then Sir Anerood Jugnauth held office as Prime Minister of Mauritius.
