= Bikramsingh Ramlallah =

Bikramsingh Ramlallah MP
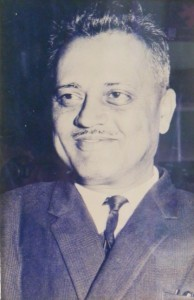

Member of Legislative Council and Legislative Assembly
- In office 1959–1976
- Prime Minister: Seewoosagur Ramgoolam

Personal details
- Born: 1915 Long Mountain, British Mauritius
- Died: 13 September 2000 (aged 85) Mauritius
- Party: Parti Travailliste

Bikramsingh Ramlallah (1915–2000), also known as Beekrumsingh Ramlallah, Beekrum Ramlallah, or Vikram Ramlallah, was a Mauritian school teacher, social worker, activist, journalist, politician and minister.

== Early life ==
In 1915 Bikramsingh Ramlallah was born in the village of Long Mountain, British Mauritius. His grandfather Ramlall and father Seenarain were Mauritian small planters. Bikramsingh Ramlallah's great-grandfather migrated from Ballia, a village located in the United Provinces of British India, to Mauritius as an indentured labourer.

== Activism ==
Ramlallah worked as a teacher and social worker. He joined the Arya Samaj movement and was also chairman of the Port-Louis-based socio-cultural movement Hindu Maha Sabha (HMS). In 1940 Bikramsingh Ramlallah founded youth movement Sewa Samithi to train young members in recreational Lathi khela.

For a number of years Ramlallah also imported books and newspapers in bulk from India, for subsequent retail sale at the Central Market of Port-Louis. Given the popularity of these publications, by 1946 Ramlallah opened Nalanda Bookshop located on Bourbon Street, Port-Louis.

In 1954 Ramlallah, with Kher Jagatsingh's assistance, founded weekly newspaper Mauritius Times.

In the 1960s, Ramlallah noticed the archaeological remains of the Coolie Ghat where indentured labourers, mainly from India, landed after their sea voyages. He successfully campaigned for the protection, preservation and restoration of the Coolie Ghat, now known as Aapravasi Ghat.

As founder-chairman of Mauritius Union of Journalists (MUJ), Ramlallah protested in 1984 along with 43 other journalists, against the government's proposed Newspapers and Periodicals (Amendment) Bill which would force print media owners to provide a security of Rs500,000, thus acting as a deterrent for small printing shops with limited financial means. Riot police arrested the 43 journalists but refused to arrest Ramlallah given his advanced age, thus prompting Ramlallah to walk to Line Barracks to support his arrested colleagues.

== Political career ==
Bikramsingh Ramlallah supported Labour Party politicians Seewoosagur Ramgoolam, Harilall Vaghjee and Aunuth Beejadhur during the legislative elections of 1948 and 1953.

Before the 1959 elections Ramlallah successfully canvassed Seewoosagur Ramgoolam in order to receive Labour Party "tickets" for journalists Kher Jagatsingh, Doojendranath Napal, Premchand Dabee, Ramawad Sewgobind, Somduth Bhuckory and himself. Five of these journalists were elected, except for Somduth Bhuckory. Thus Ramlallah was a member of the Legislative Council and Legislative Assembly from 1959 to 1976, representing Constituency No. 6 Grand Baie-Poudre D'Or and he served in a number of roles including Parliamentary Secretary (PS) and Minister.

On 8 June 1976 his son Prakash Ramlallah was killed in a car accident. Prakash had started working as a journalist at the age of 17, and trained at the International School of Journalism, Thompson Foundation in Cardiff and University of Moscow. 1976 also marked Bikramsingh Ramlallah's exit from active politics, as he did not stand as a candidate at the Legislative Assembly Elections held on 20 December 1976.

== Legacy ==
To commemorate his contribution to education and politics the government of Mauritius changed the name of Mapou State Secondary School (SSS) to Beekrumsing Ramlallah SSS.
