= Governor-General of Mauritius =

Representative of the monarch

- Coat of arms of Mauritius

- Flag of the governor-general
- Style: His Excellency
- Status: Abolished
- Residence: State House
- Appointer: Monarch of Mauritius
- Precursor: Governor of British Mauritius
- Formation: 12 March 1968; 58 years ago
- First holder: Sir John Shaw Rennie
- Final holder: Sir Veerasamy Ringadoo
- Abolished: 12 March 1992; 34 years ago
- Succession: President of Mauritius

The governor-general of Mauritius (French: gouverneur général de Maurice) was the viceregal representative of the Mauritian monarch, Queen Elizabeth II in Mauritius from the country's independence on 12 March 1968 until it became a Commonwealth republic on 12 March 1992.

The governor-general was appointed solely on the advice of the Cabinet of Mauritius, serving at the pleasure of the monarch.

Prior to the Independence of Mauritius this position was known as Governor of Mauritius since December 1810.

== List of governors-general of Mauritius ==
Symbols

^† Died in office.

Denotes acting governors-general

No.	Portrait	Name (Birth–Death)	Term of office			Monarch (Reign)
No.	Portrait	Name (Birth–Death)	Took office	Left office	Time in office	Monarch (Reign)
1		Sir John Rennie (1917–2002)	12 March 1968	3 September 1968	175 days	Elizabeth II (1968–1992)
2		Sir Leonard Williams (1904–1972)	3 September 1968	27 December 1972^{[†]}	4 years, 115 days	Elizabeth II (1968–1992)
–		Raman Osman (1902–1992); Acting	27 December 1972	30 January 1973	34 days	Elizabeth II (1968–1992)
3		Sir Raman Osman (1902–1992)	30 January 1973	31 October 1977	4 years, 274 days	Elizabeth II (1968–1992)
–		Sir Henry Garrioch (1916–2008); Acting	31 October 1977	23 March 1978	143 days	Elizabeth II (1968–1992)
–		Sir Dayendranath Burrenchobay (1919–1999); Acting	23 March 1978	26 April 1979	1 year, 34 days	Elizabeth II (1968–1992)
4		Sir Dayendranath Burrenchobay (1919–1999)	26 April 1979	28 December 1983	4 years, 246 days	Elizabeth II (1968–1992)
5		Sir Seewoosagur Ramgoolam (1900–1985)	28 December 1983	15 December 1985^{[†]}	1 year, 352 days	Elizabeth II (1968–1992)
–		Sir Cassam Moollan (1927–2010); Acting	15 December 1985	17 January 1986	33 days	Elizabeth II (1968–1992)
6		Sir Veerasamy Ringadoo (1920–2000)	17 January 1986	12 March 1992	6 years, 55 days	Elizabeth II (1968–1992)
