= Dayendranath Burrenchobay =

Governor-General of Mauritius (1919 - 1999)

The Honourable Sir Dayendranath Burrenchobay KBE CMG CVO

4th Governor-General of Mauritius
- In office 26 April 1978 – 28 December 1983
- Monarch: Elizabeth II
- Prime Minister: Seewoosagur Ramgoolam; Anerood Jugnauth
- Preceded by: Henry Garrioch (acting)
- Succeeded by: Seewoosagur Ramgoolam

Personal details
- Born: 24 March 1919 Plaine Magnien, British Mauritius
- Died: 29 March 1999 (aged 80)

Sir Dayendranath Burrenchobay, KBE, CMG, CVO, GCSK (24 March 1919 – 29 March 1999) was born in Plaine Magnien, Mauritius and served as the fourth governor-general of Mauritius.

== Early life and education ==
Burrenchobay grew up in Cemetery Road, Plaine Magnien. He travelled to London, England to further his education. Later he graduated from Imperial College, London.

== Career ==
After graduating from Imperial College, London he worked for the British Electricity Authority. On his return to Mauritius he joined the Civil Service as a teacher. He eventually became Permanent Secretary at the Ministry of Education and Cultural Affairs (1964-1967). This was followed by his appointment at Permanent Secretary at the Prime Minister's Office (1967-1976). He also was Chairman of the Central Electricity Board (Mauritius) (CEB) (1968-1976). He became Head of the Civil Service and in 1976 he was knighted. Over the same period he was Secretary of the Mahatma Gandhi Institute (MGI).

== Legacy ==
On 17 May 1984, the Sir Dayendranath Burrenchobay Foundation Act was enacted in Parliament with the objectives of promoting and encouraging research in all fields and to reward and financially assist works of importance to the economic, social and cultural development of Mauritius.

== Appointment as Governor-General ==
Dayendranath Burrenchobay was appointed by Queen Elizabeth II to hold the office of Governor-General after Henry Garrioch's retirement. Thus Burrenchobay became the third Mauritian to hold the position of Governor-General of Mauritius following previous Mauritians Sir Michel Rivalland (1968), Sir Raman Osman (1973-1977) and Sir Henry Garrioch (1977-1978). During his term as Governor General from 1978 to 1983 he oversaw two governments, first under Prime Minister Seewoosagur Ramgoolam and then when Sir Anerood Jugnauth became prime minister. Burrenchobay was succeeded by Seewoosagur Ramgoolam himself.

== Publications ==
In 2000, Burrenchobay's book Let the People Think: A Compilation of the Thoughts of Sir Dayendranath Burrenchobay was published by Editions de l'Ocean Indien.

Government offices
Preceded by Henry Garrioch; Acting	Governor-General of Mauritius; 1979 – 1983	Succeeded by Seewoosagur Ramgoolam
