= Henry Garrioch =

Acting Governor-General of Mauritius from 1977 to 1978

Sir (William) Henry Garrioch

Acting Governor-General of Mauritius
- In office 31 October 1977 – 23 March 1978
- Monarch: Elizabeth II
- Prime Minister: Seewoosagur Ramgoolam
- Preceded by: Sir Raman Osman as Governor-General
- Succeeded by: Sir Dayendranath Burrenchobay as Governor-General

Personal details
- Born: 4 May 1916 Mauritius
- Died: 18 February 2008 (aged 91) London, United Kingdom

Sir (William) Henry Garrioch (4 May 1916 – 18 February 2008) was the acting governor-general of Mauritius from 31 October 1977 until 23 March 1978.

== Legal career ==
Garrioch joined the Colonial Service in 1936 and was subsequently appointed a First Grade Clerk in 1946, when he was picked to be a judge's secretary. He became the secretary of Justice Georges Espitalier-Noël, who was able to persuade Chief Justice Sir Francis Herchenroder that Garrioch should be encouraged to embrace a legal career.

Garrioch took the advice and won the Colonial Scholarship enabling him to complete his studies in law in the United Kingdom. He was called to the Bar at Gray's Inn and to the Mauritian Bar in 1952.

On his return to Mauritius, Garrioch was immediately appointed to the post of Crown counsel, at a time in the 1950s when it was the chief justice who advised the governor on the appointment of Law Officers and District Magistrates. The established practice at that time was that members of the bar who were to join the public service had to first be appointed district magistrates; only those thought to be of the highest caliber were then transferred to the Attorney-general's Office.

Garrioch moved up in the office to become Director of Public Prosecutions, which at the time was higher in the legal hierarchy than solicitor-general. He was made a judge of the Supreme Court in 1967.

== Mauritian constitution and role in independence ==
In 1963, when the colonial secretary dispatched his chief legal adviser, Anthony Rushford Q.C., in order to finalize the draft of what was to become the Mauritian constitution of 1964 (which was to be the basis for their Independence Constitution of 1967), Rushford asked Mauritius to provide the services of its best legislative draftsman to be his counterpart. The Mauritian authorities selected Garrioch, who spent several weeks at Le Réduit to finalize the draft before it went to Her Majesty in Council.

Following Sir Maurice Latour-Adrien's retirement Henry Garrioch was appointed Chief Judge of Mauritius on 20 April 1977 at the age of 61. When Sir Raman Osman retired as Governor-General of Mauritius at the end of October 1977, Garrioch was appointed acting governor general, in line with the tradition of making the chief judge serve as chief administrator of the government.

== Honours ==
Garrioch was knighted on 31 December 1977.

Government offices
| Preceded by Sir Raman Osman as Governor-General | Governor-General of Mauritius; Acting; 1977–1978 | Succeeded by Sir Dayendranath Burrenchobay as Governor-General |
