= Mauritius Times =

Weekly newspaper in Mauritius

- Type: Weekly newspaper
- Editor: Bikramsingh Ramlallah
- Founded: 14 August 1954
- Political alignment: Centre Left
- Headquarters: Port Louis
- Website: mauritiustimes.com

Mauritius Times is a weekly newspaper which is published in Mauritius, primarily in English language.

== History ==
Mauritius Times (MT) was founded on 14 August 1954. Bikramsingh Ramlallah (also known as Beekrumsing or Beekrum) and Sir Kher Jagatsingh teamed up to start the publication, shortly after Jagatsingh had left the Civil Service and before becoming an active politician. Ramlallah was the editor of Mauritius Times from 1954 to 2000.

The Mauritius Times (founded in 1954) should not be confused with an older and defunct daily newspaper which was also called "Mauritius Times". The defunct paper used to be published a century earlier, between the 1840s and the 1930s.

== Contributions ==
News articles in Mauritius Times often analysed events in the context of the country's socio-political history. It became known as an "opinion paper". Its founder-editor Bikramsingh Ramlallah was arrested and jailed in 1984 as he was founder-chairman of the Mauritius Union of Journalists (MUJ). The MUJ had organised a public protest against the proposed restrictive Newspapers and Periodicals (Amendment) Bill. Also arrested were 44 other journalists who had joined the public protest in Port Louis.

== Website ==
Mauritius Times provides the online version of the weekly paper, including the free-to-download PDF version of the newspaper.

== See also ==
- List of newspapers in Mauritius
