= Cassam Moollan =

Governor-General and Chief Justice of Mauritius

Sir Cassam Moollan, QC
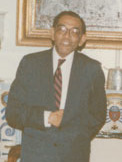

Acting Governor-General of Mauritius
- In office 15 December 1985 – 17 January 1986
- Monarch: Elizabeth II
- Prime Minister: Anerood Jugnauth
- Preceded by: Seewoosagur Ramgoolam
- Succeeded by: Veerasamy Ringadoo

Chief Justice of Mauritius
- In office 1982–1988

Personal details
- Born: Cassam Ismaël Moollan; 26 February 1927 Port Louis, Mauritius
- Died: 15 November 2010 (aged 83)
- Spouse: Lady Rassoul Moollan
- Education: London School of Economics

Sir Cassam Ismaël Moollan, QC (26 February 1927 – 15 November 2010) was the acting governor-general of Mauritius from 15 December 1985 until 17 January 1986. As chief justice of Mauritius at the time, he assumed the position immediately after the death of Sir Seewoosagur Ramgoolam until a successor could be appointed. He was knighted in 1982.

== Early life ==
He was educated at the London School of Economics and Political Science (LSE) and earned his LLB in 1950. He was called to the Bar at Lincoln's Inn the following year. Returning to Mauritius, he practised as a lawyer from 1951 to 1955. He served as a Magistrate (1955–58), Crown Counsel (1958–64), and Senior Crown Counsel (1964–66).

He was appointed the Solicitor General in 1966. In 1969, a year before his appointment as Puisne Judge, the Supreme Court, he was made Queen's Counsel (QC). He became Senior Puisne Judge in 1978, editor of the Mauritius Law Report from 1982 to 1984. He became Chief Justice in 1982, a position he held until his retirement in 1988.

He was knighted by the Queen in the 1982 Birthday Honours and awarded the Chevalier de la Légion d'honneur by France in 1986.

Government offices
Preceded by Sir Seewoosagur Ramgoolam as Governor-General	Governor-General of Mauritius; Acting; 1985–1986	Succeeded by Sir Veerasamy Ringadoo as Governor-General
