= Seewoosagur Ramgoolam =

Prime Minister of Mauritius from 1968 to 1982

The Right Honourable Sir Seewoosagur Ramgoolam GCMG
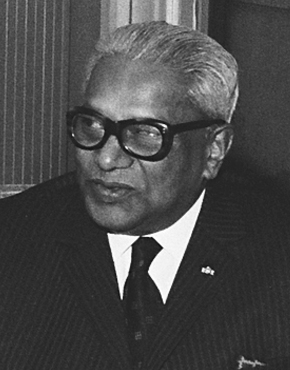
- Ramgoolam in Brussels, February 1970

Governor-General of Mauritius
- In office 28 December 1983 – 15 December 1985
- Monarch: Elizabeth II
- Prime Minister: Anerood Jugnauth
- Preceded by: Dayendranath Burrenchobay
- Succeeded by: Cassam Moollan (acting)

1st Prime Minister of Mauritius
- In office 21 November 1967 (Note: Ramgoolam took the title of Prime Minister on 21 November 1967, after the date of independence had been fixed; Mauritius became independent on 12 March 1968.) – 15 June 1982
- Monarch: Elizabeth II
- Governors General: John Shaw Rennie; Leonard Williams; Raman Osman; Henry Garrioch (acting); Dayendranath Burrenchobay
- Preceded by: Himself (as Premier)
- Succeeded by: Anerood Jugnauth

Premier of Mauritius
- In office 12 March 1964 – 21 November 1967
- Monarch: Elizabeth II
- Governor: John Shaw Rennie
- Preceded by: Himself (as Chief Minister)
- Succeeded by: Himself (as Prime Minister)

Chief Minister of Mauritius
- In office 26 September 1961 – 12 March 1964
- Monarch: Elizabeth II
- Preceded by: Office established
- Succeeded by: Himself (as Premier)

Leader of the Labour Party
- In office 1958 (Note: Sources give different dates for his becoming leader of the party. Dukhira gives 1951, the Mauritius Museums Council 1953, the historian Satyendra Peerthum 1956, after Rozemont's death, and Rivière 1958. Simmons describes him as the party's undisputed leader in the Legislative Council from 1950.)–1983
- Preceded by: Guy Rozemont
- Succeeded by: Satcam Boolell

Mayor of Port Louis
- Incumbent
- Assumed office 1958

Personal details
- Born: 18 September 1900 Belle Rive (now Kewal Nagar), Flacq District, British Mauritius
- Died: 15 December 1985 (aged 85) Le Réduit, Mauritius
- Resting place: Sir Seewoosagur Ramgoolam Botanical Garden, Pamplemousses
- Party: Labour Party
- Other political affiliations: Independence Party (alliance, 1967)
- Spouse: Sushil Ramjoorawon (m. 1941; died 1984)
- Children: 2, including Navin
- Parent: Moheeth Ramgoolam (father)
- Education: Royal College Curepipe
- Alma mater: University College London
- Profession: Physician
- Awards: United Nations Prize in the Field of Human Rights (1973)

Sir Seewoosagur Ramgoolam GCMG (18 September 1900 – 15 December 1985), often known as SSR or Chacha ("uncle"), was a Mauritian physician and statesman who led Mauritius to independence from the United Kingdom. He was the colony's chief minister from 1961 and premier from 1964, the first prime minister of independent Mauritius from 1968 to 1982, and governor-general from 1983 until his death. He is widely known in Mauritius as the "Father of the Nation".

The son of an indentured labourer from Bihar, Ramgoolam was born in a village in eastern Mauritius. He studied medicine in London, where he joined the Fabian Society and Indian nationalist circles and met Mahatma Gandhi. After returning home in 1935 he became a leader of the Indo-Mauritian community, co-founded the newspaper Advance and was nominated to the colony's Council of Government in 1940. Elected to the Legislative Council in 1948, he became the leader of the Labour Party group in the council and, by 1958, of the party itself. He campaigned for universal suffrage and ministerial government, both of which Britain conceded in the late 1950s.

As chief minister and premier, Ramgoolam led the parties that sought independence at the Lancaster House conference of 1965. During the conference, after being told that Britain could separate the islands without Mauritian consent, he agreed to the detachment of the Chagos Archipelago, which Britain made into the British Indian Ocean Territory. The detachment led to the expulsion of the islands' inhabitants between 1967 and 1973, a decision taken by the United Kingdom and the United States, not by Mauritius. Opponents, and some of the displaced Chagossians, long accused Ramgoolam of trading the islands for independence. British records later showed that Britain was prepared to detach them regardless, and in 2019 the International Court of Justice found that the detachment had not been based on the free and genuine will of the people of Mauritius. His Independence Party won the 1967 election, and Mauritius became independent on 12 March 1968.

As prime minister, Ramgoolam governed through coalitions, including one with his former opponents in the Parti Mauricien Social Démocrate. His governments built a welfare state, introduced free secondary education and promoted the export processing zones that began the diversification of the sugar economy. They also ruled under a state of emergency from 1971 to 1976 to contain strikes led by the Mauritian Militant Movement. He signed the Lomé Convention, which guaranteed a European market for Mauritian sugar, and was chairman of the Organisation of African Unity in 1976–1977. After losing his seat in the 1982 election he became governor-general, and he died in office in 1985. The country's main airport and the botanic garden at Pamplemousses are named after him, and his likeness appears on Mauritian coins and banknotes. His son Navin Ramgoolam has served three terms as prime minister.

== Early life ==
=== Family background ===
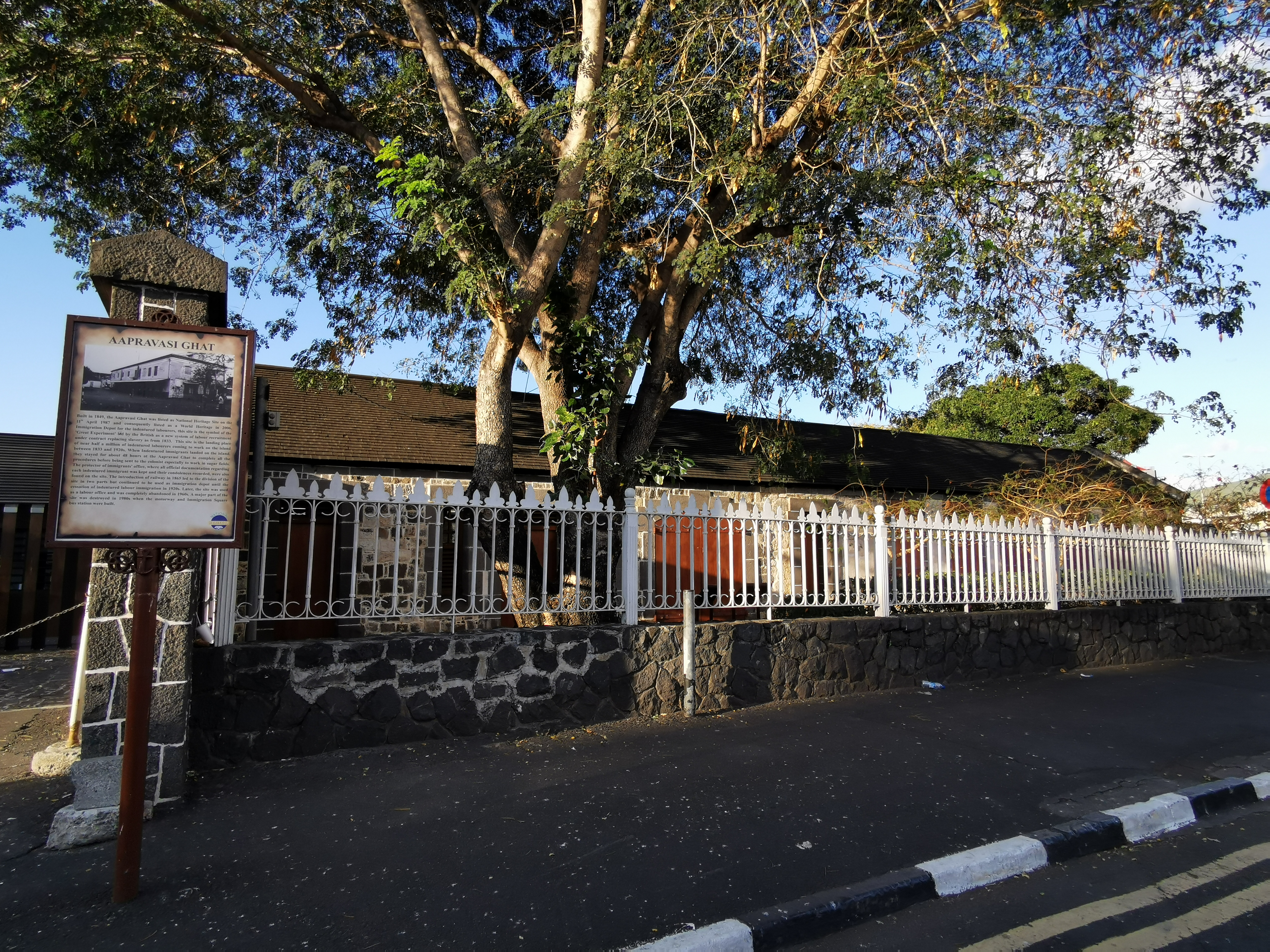
The Aapravasi Ghat in Port Louis, the immigration depot through which indentured labourers from India entered Mauritius

Ramgoolam's father, Moheeth Ramgoolam, was an indentured labourer from Bihar who arrived in Mauritius at the age of eighteen and later became a sirdar, or overseer, on a sugar estate. (Note: Sources differ on the year of his arrival: a University of Edinburgh project on indentured migration gives 1896, while the historian Satyendra Peerthum gives 1871.) The family's ancestral village has been identified as Harigaon, in the Bhojpur district of Bihar, which Ramgoolam's son Navin visited in 2008. According to biographical essays published by the Mauritian government for Ramgoolam's birth centenary, his mother, Basmati Ramchurn, was a young widow with two sons, Nuckchadee Heeramun and Ramlall Ramchurn, when she married Moheeth.

=== Childhood and education ===
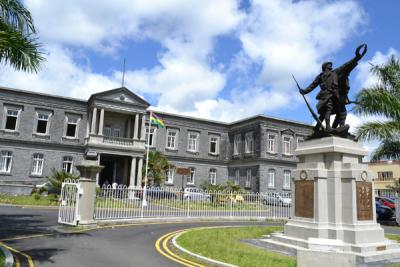
The Royal College Curepipe, where he completed his secondary education

Seewoosagur Ramgoolam was born on 18 September 1900 at Belle Rive, a sugar-estate village in the Flacq district in the east of the island, into a poor Hindu family. He was known in the family as Kewal, and the locality where he was born is now called Kewal Nagar. His father died when he was seven; accounts differ on when his mother died, but by the age of nine he had lost both parents. He was looked after by his mother and his half-brother Ramlall, a fairly prosperous small planter at Belle Rive.

He learnt Hindi and the rudiments of Indian culture at home and at the village baitka, where Hindu children were taught their language and culture, and then attended a Roman Catholic aided school and the Bel Air Government School, travelling by train. He prepared for the scholarship examinations at the Curepipe Boys' Government School while lodging with an uncle, a sworn land surveyor, and went on to the Royal College Curepipe, the colony's leading secondary school. At the age of twelve he lost the sight of his left eye in an accident. (Note: An account of 1966 describes him as "blind in one eye since infancy".) After leaving the Royal College he worked briefly as a clerk in the civil service.

== Years in Britain (1921–1935) ==
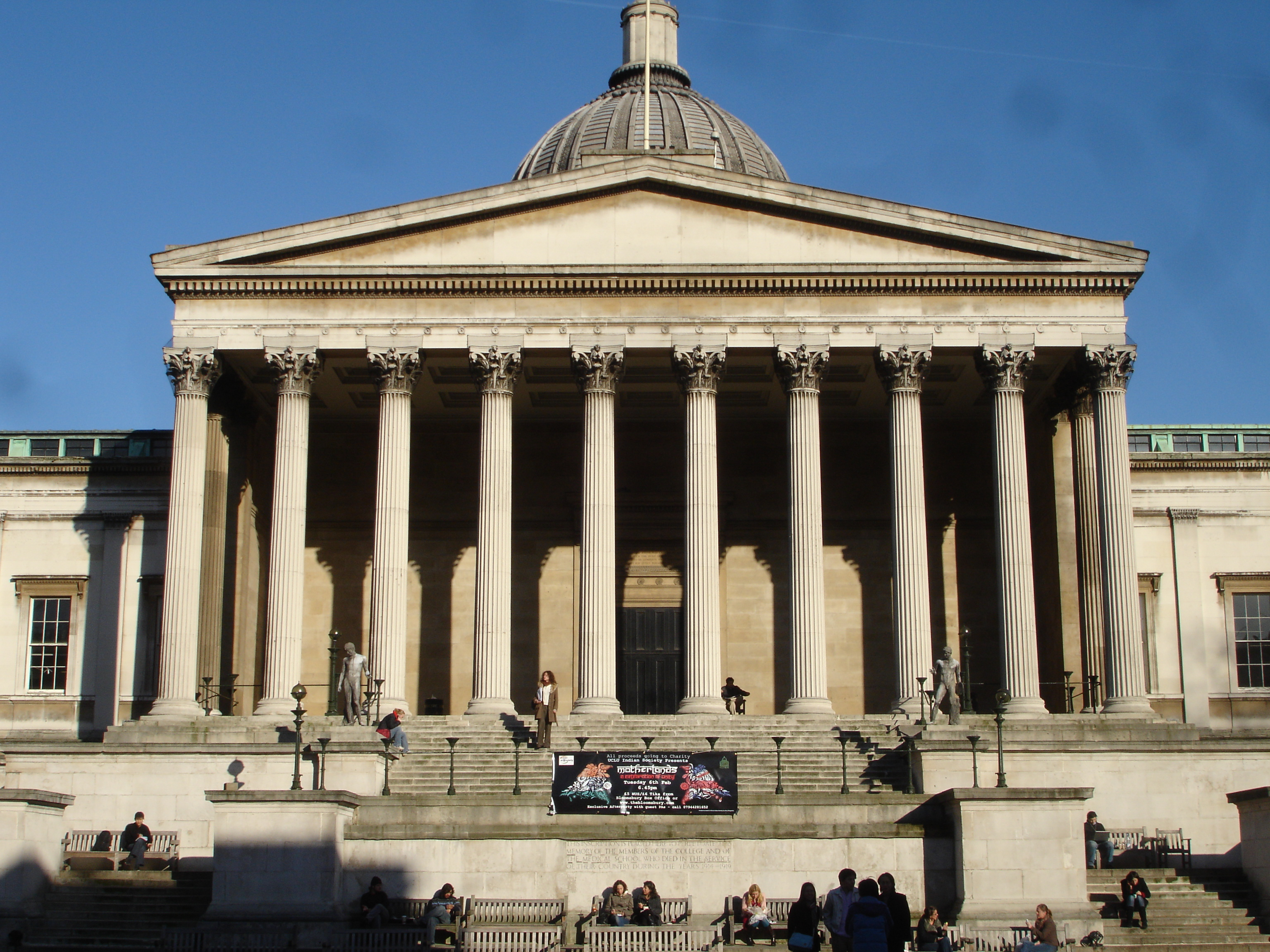
The portico of University College London, where Ramgoolam studied medicine

In 1921 Ramgoolam left for Britain to study medicine, one of the first young Mauritian Hindus to attend a British university. According to Simmons he set off "with only a few pounds in his pocket"; his studies were paid for by his half-brother Ramlall until Ramlall, who had backed Rajcoomar Gujadhur against the powerful Pierre Montocchio in Flacq at the 1926 election, lost his position and land, after which Ramgoolam had to interrupt his studies and depended on occasional help from home, including money raised by the Mauritian politician G. M. D. Atchia in 1932. He studied at University College London and University College Hospital, and qualified with the diplomas of Licentiate of the Royal College of Physicians (LRCP) and Member of the Royal College of Surgeons (MRCS). He later recalled that he had also attended economics lectures at the London School of Economics, whose Fabian ideals shaped his political thought. He spent some twelve to fourteen years in Britain.

London gave him what Addison and Hazareesingh call "a useful political apprenticeship". He read widely in contemporary and socialist literature, poetry and drama; T. S. Eliot became his favourite author. He joined the Fabian Society, attended meetings of the British Labour Party and came to know socialist politicians such as George Lansbury, Fenner Brockway and Arthur Creech Jones, who later became the Labour Party's spokesman on colonial affairs; he was also in touch with intellectuals including Harold Laski and G. D. H. Cole. To earn money he wrote articles and letters for London newspapers, including The Morning Post, the Daily Herald and The Times. He later wrote that Marxism had left "a deep and everlasting impression" on his thinking during these years, before he settled on Fabian socialism.

He was drawn above all into the Indian nationalist movement. For his first six months in London he lived at the Indian Students' Association, and he became organising secretary and a member of the executive committee of the Indian Students' Union, through which he met Jawaharlal Nehru, Vallabhbhai Patel, Muhammad Ali Jinnah and V. K. Krishna Menon. He worked for a time as secretary to the Indian nationalist Vithalbhai Patel, who, he later said, "initiated me into the art and science of politics", and he was active in the London branch of the Indian National Congress, which he chaired in 1924 and served for a time as secretary. He took a leading part in Indian students' agitation in London for Indian home rule, and recalled that Subhas Chandra Bose, whom he admired most among the Indian leaders, sent him the manuscript of The Indian Struggle to proofread. In 1931, when Mahatma Gandhi came to London for the second Round Table Conference, Ramgoolam met him at a tea party; he also met Rabindranath Tagore and Srinivasa Sastri. Through letters from home and Mauritian visitors to London, he kept in touch with events on the island.

He returned to Mauritius in September 1935 (Note: Simmons and Bowman date his return to 1934; Dukhira and Varma give 1935.) and set up his medical practice at 87 Desforges Street in Port Louis, in the wooden house where he lived for the next thirty years.

== Entry into public life (1935–1948) ==
=== Doctor, writer and community leader ===
Back in Mauritius, Ramgoolam soon earned a reputation as a competent physician and began writing literary and social criticism for the newspapers Le Radical and Le Mauricien, and also wrote for Arya Vir. At the invitation of Kissoonsingh Hazareesingh, he joined the committee organising the centenary of the arrival of Indian indentured labourers, and he and the lawyer Rampersad Neerunjun were prominent figures in the celebrations of December 1935. The historian Adele Smith Simmons saw the centenary as the point at which the quiet style of the older Indo-Mauritian leaders gave way to younger, more forceful men.

The main result of the centenary was the Indian Cultural Association, founded early in 1936; Ramgoolam was one of its founders and, according to the political scientist Larry W. Bowman, its most prominent figure. In the first issue of its journal, the Indian Cultural Review, he published an article entitled "Sons of Immigrants", which called for a mass movement in Mauritius and which Hazareesingh later described as his political manifesto. In his speeches of the period Ramgoolam quoted Aristotle, H. G. Wells and the Fabian Society leaders Beatrice and Sidney Webb, but Simmons notes that his challenges were still addressed to intellectuals rather than to the labourers on the sugar estates. Bowman wrote that he showed from the beginning "a marked ability to move easily between elite circles and the Indian agricultural workers", and he spent his Sundays at the anniversary celebrations of village Hindi schools and other social and religious gatherings. It was in these years that he came to be known as chacha, the Hindi word for "uncle", a name that conveyed both warmth and respect.

Ramgoolam did not formally join the Labour Party founded by Maurice Curé in 1936; while he spoke of a future "mass movement", it was Curé who toured the estate camps talking to labourers about wages and trade unions. (Note: Sources differ on when Ramgoolam joined the party. Addison and Hazareesingh list him among the leaders who addressed meetings for the new party in its early years. Dukhira reports that he announced at a Labour Day meeting in May 1947 that he had joined the party, and that he and his associates formally joined it after the 1948 election. Rivière gives the late 1940s and, in another entry, 1948; Simmons and Bowman give 1950. In 1975 Ramgoolam himself told President Gerald Ford that he had led the party "since 1948".)

=== Advance and the Council of Government ===
In 1940 Ramgoolam, Aunauth Beejadhur and other members of the Indian Cultural Association founded Advance, a daily published in English and French. Though at first, in Simmons's words, "a paper for intellectuals", it became the voice of Ramgoolam's politics; writing under the pen name "Thumb Mark II", he told the island's conservatives that "your time is done" and that they should leave "the rising proletariat to clean the Augean stable".

Wishing, as he later put it, "to take up politics seriously" after first gaining experience "at the level of local politics and government", he entered the municipal politics of Port Louis, where he protested at the "dictatorial manner" in which the conservative council elected in 1940 chose the mayor. Elected to the council in 1943 with Raoul Rivet in the group of Edgar Laurent and Samuel Fouquereaux, he was returned in 1946 in the camp of the Union Mauricienne, which defeated the Labour candidates, among them Rozemont. That year he served as deputy to the mayor, G. M. D. Atchia. (Note: Rivière, Lentz and the International Year Book date his election to the council to 1940; Dukhira writes that he was defeated as a Union Mauricienne candidate in 1940 and elected in 1943.)

In 1940 the governor, Sir Bede Clifford, nominated him to the Council of Government in place of the Indian member Seerbookun, who had died in a road accident, to speak for the Indian community, the small planters and the labourers at a time when Hindus, although a majority of the population, had almost no voice in the colony's institutions. Clifford later said that he had "never considered anyone but Dr Ramgoolam for the position", but the Labour newspaper Le Peuple Mauricien criticised the appointment, arguing that Ramgoolam had given no help to the dockers and labourers in the struggle led by Emmanuel Anquetil. In the council, Simmons describes him as the only unofficial member who tested the established interests: he called the 1943 budget "a budget of the upper class, a budget from which anything concerned with the welfare of the working classes had been entirely left out", and demanded that the Industrial Association Ordinance, which governed trade unions, and the old-age pension be revised. After Sir Donald Mackenzie-Kennedy succeeded Clifford as governor in 1942, Ramgoolam found himself increasingly out of sympathy with official policy and moved into opposition so that he could campaign openly for a wider franchise. In his view social and economic reform could only follow constitutional reform, and in July 1944 he called in the council for the replacement of the constitution of 1885.

When the governor set up consultative committees on a new constitution in 1945, Ramgoolam argued for the abolition of property qualifications, plural voting and reserved seats and, as a fall-back, for a franchise based on a simple literacy test, which would let labourers who could write their names in Hindi or other Indian languages vote. The committees brought leaders of all classes and communities together in one room for the first time. In January 1947 he told the second committee: "We are not against female suffrage, if it is extended to all women in the country without distinction of creed or class." His proposal for a literacy franchise was accepted, and many labourers who had learnt to write their names in an Indian language gained the vote. The constitution of 1947 abolished the property qualification and gave the vote to men and women who could pass a simple literacy test, which could be taken in any of eight languages, among them Hindustani, Tamil, Urdu and Creole. The electorate grew about sixfold, from fewer than 12,000 voters to 71,806 registered for the 1948 election.

== Legislative Council and leadership of the Labour Party (1948–1961) ==
=== Elected member and liaison officer ===
In the general election of 9–10 August 1948, the first held under the new constitution, Ramgoolam stood as an independent in the three-member constituency of Pamplemousses–Rivière du Rempart, in the north of the island. He and two other independents, Aunauth Beejadhur and Harilal Vaghjee, won all three seats, defeating the Labour candidates. Hindu candidates won every seat in the rural three-member constituencies. Most of them were professionals like the five doctors and lawyers of the Indian Cultural Association circle whom Ramgoolam had grouped in an informal alliance outside the Labour Party, although many of their new voters had learnt to pass the literacy test in the village schools of the Bissoondoyal brothers.

He was appointed to the Executive Council. When the governor introduced a limited forerunner of ministerial government in April 1951, he became one of three "liaison officers", with responsibility for education, a post he held until September 1956. He had earlier chaired the Hindu Education Authority. In 1953 he told the council that the liaison system "should be done away with and replaced by something which gives more power and responsibility to the people of this country".

Of the members sympathetic to Labour after 1948, Ramgoolam was the only one with previous legislative experience, and newcomers looked to him for advice. Simmons contrasted him with the party's charismatic leader Guy Rozemont: Ramgoolam was "neither flamboyant nor charismatic, but he had a gift for compromise and negotiation", and while Rozemont had built the party from the bottom up, Ramgoolam would build it "from the top down", starting in the Legislative Council. The conservative newspaper Le Cernéen attacked him: its columnist Noël Marrier d'Unienville portrayed him as "the figure of the communist movement in Mauritius" and captioned his photograph as the man of the Kremlin. These attacks drove the Indo-Mauritian and Creole elected members to rally around him. Having shown "cautious interest" in the Labour Party in 1946, he associated his name with it in 1950 and became its undisputed leader in the Legislative Council, while Rozemont remained its president.

After the 1948 election Hazareesingh suggested a non-contributory old-age pension. The Colonial Office asked for an actuarial study first, but Ramgoolam, a member of the council's finance committee, pressed for immediate introduction, and a monthly pension of Rs 10 began to be paid to people over sixty. The general election of August 1953 was fought on a programme of nationalisation of the sugar industry, health insurance, food subsidies, roads, schools and hospitals. The party under Rozemont and Ramgoolam won 13 of the 19 elected seats, (Note: Addison and Hazareesingh give fourteen.) and Ramgoolam was re-elected for Pamplemousses–Rivière du Rempart.

=== Labour leader and the move to universal suffrage ===
In July 1955 Ramgoolam went to London with Rozemont, Renganaden Seeneevassen and Guy Forget as Labour's delegation to constitutional talks, where he asked for universal adult suffrage and a ministerial system. Rozemont died on 22 March 1956. (Note: Varma gives 23 March.) His death, Simmons argues, was the turning point in Labour's change from a class party into a communal alliance between Hindus and Muslims. The party was now led by Indian intellectuals rather than the Creole dockers and artisans who had followed Rozemont. On 25 September 1956 Ramgoolam announced that Labour would take no part in the Legislative Council's election of members to the Executive Council, and the Labour members withdrew from the chamber during the vote. His terms on the Executive Council and as liaison officer ended that month. After Labour won the Port Louis municipal election of September 1956 he again became deputy mayor, and in 1958 he was elected mayor.

The proposals published in 1957 by the Colonial Secretary, Alan Lennox-Boyd, for a majority leader, more elected members and universal adult suffrage were, in Simmons's assessment, "a significant gain for Ramgoolam and his party". After talks in London in February 1957, in which Ramgoolam represented Labour with Forget, Seeneevassen and Raymond Rault, agreement was reached on a ministerial system. On 5 July 1957 Ramgoolam became Ministerial Secretary to the Treasury, one of the colony's first ministers. (Note: Several reference works date this appointment to 1958.) After Seeneevassen, the next in line for the succession, died on 5 June 1958, Ramgoolam took over the leadership of the party; by custom the separate post of party president was held by a Creole.

For the general election of 9 March 1959, the first held under universal adult suffrage, Ramgoolam made an electoral alliance with Abdool Razack Mohamed's Comité d'Action Musulman (CAM), and urged Hindu voters in some constituencies to support CAM candidates. Labour won 23 of the 40 elected seats, and Ramgoolam was elected for Triolet. He remained Ministerial Secretary to the Treasury, a post renamed Minister of Finance on 30 April 1960. At the end of that year, when a new colonial secretary took office, the duties of Leader of the House were transferred to him as the senior elected member. Dukhira dates his appointment as Leader of the House to 4 November 1960. In the debate on the 1961 report of Richard Titmuss on population growth, Ramgoolam, a doctor, urged that the government "should provide all facilities which will enable the population to adopt the methods they like", calling it "a question of life and death". Public funding for family planning, however, came only in the mid-1960s.

== Road to independence (1961–1968) ==
=== Chief Minister and Premier ===
At the constitutional conference held in London in June 1961 under the Colonial Secretary Iain Macleod, the British government agreed to internal self-government in two stages, the first of which made the leader of the majority party chief minister. Simmons judged the outcome a victory for Labour: the Colonial Office appeared to have decided that Ramgoolam was the politician to support, and by refusing the opposition's demand for an immediate election it gave him time to rebuild his party. He returned to Mauritius on 18 September 1961 to a reception of tens of thousands of people at the airport, where Curé, the Labour Party's founder, embraced him. On 26 September 1961, when the Legislative Council resumed its session, he assumed the title of Chief Minister, keeping the post of Minister of Finance. (Note: The instruments giving the office constitutional force came into effect on 1 January 1962, which is why some sources date his appointment to 1962.) His government introduced a family allowance in January 1962, one of the recommendations of the report on population and social policy by Richard Titmuss.

At the general election of 21 October 1963, the first in which a major party, the Parti Mauricien led in the towns by Gaëtan Duval, openly appealed to communal fears, Ramgoolam did not answer with a communal campaign of his own but campaigned on the government's record. Labour won 19 of the 40 seats with 42.3 per cent of the vote, two short of a majority, and Ramgoolam held his seat in Triolet. His new government, sworn in on 12 November 1963, did not include the Parti Mauricien, whose agreement to join broke down at the last moment. After talks at the Colonial Office in February 1964, a new constitution came into force on 12 March 1964; the Legislative Council became the Legislative Assembly and the Executive Council the Council of Ministers, and the governor appointed Ramgoolam Premier, at the head of an all-party government that included the Parti Mauricien, the Independent Forward Bloc (IFB) of Sookdeo Bissoondoyal and the CAM. The coalition was strained by personal feuds, notably between Duval and the Labour minister Harold Walter, and Simmons credits Ramgoolam with keeping it together until November 1965. Communal violence in May 1965 led the governor to declare a state of emergency and call in British troops.

Ramgoolam was appointed a Knight Bachelor in the Queen's Birthday Honours of June 1965, and Queen Elizabeth II dubbed him at Buckingham Palace on 18 September 1965, while the constitutional conference was sitting.

=== 1965 constitutional conference ===
At the constitutional conference held at Lancaster House in London from 7 to 24 September 1965, Ramgoolam led the parties that sought independence, the Labour Party, the IFB and the CAM, against the Parti Mauricien Social Démocrate (PMSD), which argued for continued association with Britain and a referendum. Both he and Duval knew the Colonial Secretary, Anthony Greenwood, and each expected to be favoured. On the electoral system, Labour refused proportional representation, and Ramgoolam proposed multi-member constituencies of no more than three members. On the last day of the conference Greenwood announced that Mauritius would become independent after a general election under a new electoral system, if the new assembly asked for it by a simple majority; the PMSD, which had demanded a referendum, stayed away from the final session.

=== Detachment of the Chagos Archipelago ===
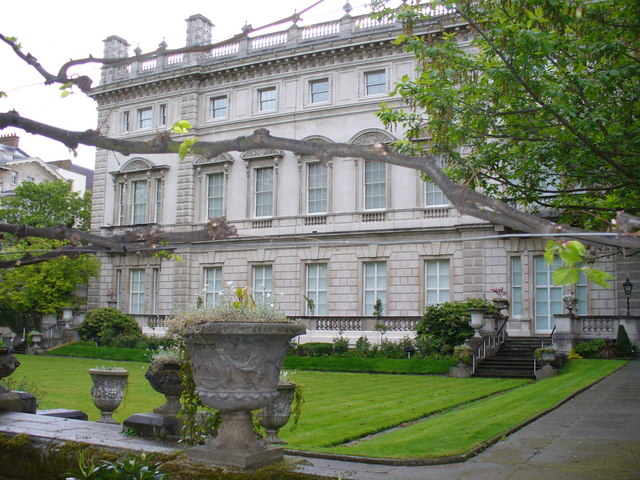
Lancaster House, London, where the constitutional conference of 1965 was held

==== Negotiations of 1965 ====
In 1964 and 1965 the British and United States governments planned a military facility on Diego Garcia, the largest island of the Chagos Archipelago, which was then administered as a dependency of Mauritius. British ministers and officials believed that the United Kingdom could separate the islands from Mauritius by Order in Council without Mauritian consent, but preferred to obtain it. When the Governor put the proposal to the Council of Ministers in July 1965, Ramgoolam and Gaëtan Duval expressed "dislike of detachment". The ministers said that detachment "would be unacceptable to public opinion in Mauritius" and asked instead for a long lease, for example of 99 years. Britain refused a lease, and in August 1965 ministers planned to tell the Mauritian leaders, if they would not agree, that Britain would consider their country's future status "without the Chagos Archipelago".

The question was settled in private meetings during the constitutional conference at Lancaster House in London. On 22 September 1965 the Prime Minister, Harold Wilson, was briefed before meeting Ramgoolam the next morning. His private secretary wrote:

The object is to frighten him with hope: hope that he might get independence; Fright lest he might not unless he is sensible about the detachment of the Chagos Archipelago.

The attached Colonial Office brief stated that "in the last resort, however, detachment could be carried out without Mauritius consent". It suggested that Wilson "may therefore wish to make some oblique reference to the fact that H.M.G. have the legal right to detach Chagos by Order in Council, without Mauritius consent but this would be a grave step". The British record of the meeting at 10 Downing Street on 23 September reads:

The Prime Minister went on to say that, in theory, there were a number of possibilities. The Premier and his colleagues could return to Mauritius either with Independence or without it. On the Defence point, Diego Garcia could either be detached by order in Council or with the agreement of the Premier and his colleagues. The best solution of all might be Independence and detachment by agreement, although he could not of course commit the Colonial Secretary at this point.

Wilson also told Ramgoolam that Diego Garcia "was not all that important" and that "this was a matter between Britain and Mauritius"; the brief had described, as "not for mention", a secret American contribution to the cost. Ramgoolam replied that "the question of Diego Garcia was a matter of detail; there was no difficulty in principle". That afternoon at Lancaster House the Colonial Secretary, Anthony Greenwood, said that he needed a decision at the meeting. He told the Mauritian ministers that other British ministers were aware "that it would be possible for the British Government to detach them from Mauritius by Order in Council", and refused Ramgoolam's renewed request for a lease. Ramgoolam, Sookdeo Bissoondoyal and Abdool Razack Mohamed then agreed in principle to detachment, in return for undertakings that included compensation of £3 million, British help over sugar sales to the United States, the benefit to Mauritius of any minerals or oil, and the return of the islands when they were no longer needed for defence. These became known as the Lancaster House undertakings. The Council of Ministers confirmed the agreement on 5 November 1965, with the PMSD ministers dissenting.

The same day Greenwood urged Wilson to act quickly, because if the matter was raised at the United Nations first "the Mauritius Government will be under considerable pressure to withdraw their agreement"; it was "therefore important that we should be able to present the U.N. with a fait accompli". The British Indian Ocean Territory was created by Order in Council on 8 November 1965. It consisted of the Chagos Archipelago and three islands detached from the colony of Seychelles: Aldabra, Farquhar and Desroches. The three PMSD ministers resigned from the Mauritian government. On 16 December 1965 the UN General Assembly, in Resolution 2066 (XX), invited the United Kingdom "to take no action which would dismember the Territory of Mauritius and violate its territorial integrity". The removal of the islanders was decided by the British and American governments, not by Mauritius. On 30 December 1966 the two governments concluded the Exchange of Notes, under which the territory remained under British sovereignty and was made available for the defence purposes of both countries; Mauritius was not a party to it. A confidential Agreed Minute recorded that the British "administrative measures" referred to in the agreement included "resettling any inhabitants". In 1971 the British commissioner of the territory enacted an Immigration Ordinance that made it unlawful to enter or remain in the islands without a permit and allowed him to order a person's removal. The detachment thus led to the expulsion of the Chagossians: between 1967 and 1973 the United Kingdom removed the entire population of the archipelago, or prevented its members from returning, to make way for the base on Diego Garcia. The islanders were taken to Mauritius and Seychelles. In 2019 the International Court of Justice found that they had been "either prevented from returning or forcibly removed and prevented from returning by the United Kingdom".

Seychelles was compensated more generously. According to a State Department paper of October 1975, Britain had provided it with £6.2 million, in the form of the construction of Mahé airport, for the three islands, against £3 million paid to Mauritius for the whole Chagos Archipelago, and Mauritius might cite this as a precedent. As Seychelles moved towards independence, its leaders asked for the islands back, and in 1975–1976 the British and American governments agreed to return them. The archive records give their reasons:

- there was "no real defence need" for the islands, and a planned airfield on Aldabra had been dropped "for economic and ecological reasons (the threat to the endangered giant tortoise)";
- their return would "virtually assure the peaceful and orderly transition of Seychelles to independence";
- the islands were inhabited, and "after the outcry over the workers removed from the Chagos Archipelago, it would be extremely difficult politically to do the same thing in the ex-Seychelles islands";
- the return might be presented to Mauritius as "an earnest of good intent" that the Chagos Archipelago would also be returned when no longer needed, and might stop Seychelles and Mauritius "making common cause" against the territory at the OAU and the United Nations.

Both governments feared that the return might encourage Mauritius to press for the Chagos Archipelago, but British officials argued that "essentially Mauritius had no leverage over Chagos", whereas Seychelles had leverage in its independence negotiations. When the Ramgoolam government asked in March 1976 to be represented at the talks, Britain refused. It assured Mauritius in writing that the Chagos islands would be returned "when they are no longer needed for defence purposes in the same way as the three ex-Seychelles islands are now being returned to Seychelles". Aldabra, Farquhar and Desroches were returned to Seychelles on its independence on 29 June 1976, on conditions that included denying them to hostile powers.

==== What the British records show ====
The British government's own records of 1964–1967, produced as evidence in the arbitration brought by Mauritius and before the International Court of Justice, show that Britain treated the detachment as settled before the Mauritian ministers were consulted. It was prepared to carry it out without their consent, and it sought their agreement in order to secure what a Colonial Office telegram of July 1965 called "willing and public acquiescence". An interdepartmental paper of 1964 noted that the government had the constitutional power to act without the consent of the Mauritius government, but that doing so would expose it to criticism in Parliament and at the United Nations. Greenwood pressed for the order to be made before the UN could intervene so as to "present the U.N. with a fait accompli", and when Britain announced the new territory in the General Assembly's Fourth Committee on 16 November 1965, its representative described it as "an administrative re-adjustment, freely worked out with the Government and elected representatives of the people concerned". In 1967, when it seemed that the secret American contribution might become public, a draft British ministerial minute warned that the government would be accused of having "deliberately deceived the Mauritius Government in order to secure their agreement to the separation from Mauritius of the Chagos Archipelago at a low level of compensation". It recalled that Wilson had told Ramgoolam the matter was only between Britain and Mauritius, and noted that Mauritius had "only agreed with the utmost reluctance to compensation limited to £3m. when it was thought that Britain was meeting the full amount".

==== Accusations and Ramgoolam's accounts ====
For decades the opposition accused Ramgoolam of having traded, or "sold", the archipelago for independence. Resentment of Mauritian leaders was also felt among the displaced islanders, who blamed them as well as Britain. Their leader Olivier Bancoult told the High Court in London that the Chagos Refugees Group had been founded "as an Ilois group for Ilois, because they felt betrayed by Mauritian politicians and intellectuals". The agreement became, in Bowman's words, "a perennial thorn" in Mauritius's relations with Britain and the United States and a lasting source of friction between Ramgoolam and his opponents. His own accounts varied. In 1974 he told the Legislative Assembly that his government had consented and that "even if we did not want to detach it, I think, from the legal point of view, Great Britain was entitled to make arrangements as she thought fit and proper". In 1979 he said "we had no choice", and in November 1980 he told the Assembly: "We were a colony", and "Great Britain could have excised the Chagos Archipelago". Before the Legislative Assembly's select committee in 1982–83 he explained: "I had to see which was better — to cede out a portion of our territory of which few people knew, and independence. I thought that independence was much more primordial and more important than the excision of the island". According to the committee's report, he said that he had been "put before the choice of either retaining the archipelago or obtaining independence", but he "refused to describe the deal as a blackmail". The committee itself concluded that the "blackmail element" in the negotiations "strongly puts in question the legal validity of the excision". His colleague Satcam Boolell later wrote that Ramgoolam had not simply submitted to British demands but "surrendered after it was clear to him that he could not win".

The United Kingdom rejects this reading. It has called the portrayal of detachment as a condition of independence "a wholly inaccurate portrayal, invented by Mauritius many years after the relevant events". It argues that independence was announced on 24 September 1965, before the Council of Ministers gave its agreement, and that the Mauritian ministers negotiated actively and secured improved terms.

==== Findings of the arbitral tribunal and the International Court of Justice ====
In 2015 an arbitral tribunal constituted under the Law of the Sea Convention decided the case brought by Mauritius over the Chagos Marine Protected Area (Mauritius v. United Kingdom). The majority held that it had no jurisdiction over sovereignty, but found that the Lancaster House undertakings were legally binding on the United Kingdom. In a dissenting and concurring opinion, two of the five arbitrators, Judges James Kateka and Rüdiger Wolfrum, examined the British records and concluded that "Mauritius had no choice", because "the detachment of the Chagos Archipelago was already decided whether Mauritius gave its consent or not". They held that Wilson's statement that Ramgoolam could return home with or without independence "amounts to duress".

At the request of the General Assembly in Resolution 71/292 (2017), the International Court of Justice gave its advisory opinion on the legal consequences of the separation of the Chagos Archipelago on 25 February 2019. The court observed that when the Council of Ministers agreed to the detachment, Mauritius was a colony under British authority, and that "it is not possible to talk of an international agreement, when one of the parties to it, Mauritius, which is said to have ceded the territory to the United Kingdom, was under the authority of the latter". Applying "heightened scrutiny" to the question of consent, it concluded that the detachment "was not based on the free and genuine expression of the will of the people concerned". By 13 votes to 1 it found that the decolonisation of Mauritius had not been lawfully completed when the country became independent in 1968, and that the United Kingdom was under an obligation to end its administration of the archipelago as rapidly as possible. In Resolution 73/295 of 22 May 2019 the General Assembly affirmed that "the Chagos Archipelago forms an integral part of the territory of Mauritius". It demanded that the United Kingdom "withdraw its colonial administration from the Chagos Archipelago unconditionally within a period of no more than six months". On 22 May 2025 the two governments signed the Agreement concerning the Chagos Archipelago including Diego Garcia. Under it the United Kingdom accepts that "Mauritius is sovereign over the Chagos Archipelago in its entirety, including Diego Garcia". In return, Mauritius authorises the United Kingdom to lease Diego Garcia, the site of the joint UK–US military base, for an initial period of 99 years. Ramgoolam's son Navin, who became prime minister in November 2024, renegotiated the financial terms and the conditions for extending the lease before the treaty was signed.

=== The 1967 election and independence ===
The report of the electoral commission chaired by Sir Harold Banwell, published in 1966, was accepted by the PMSD but rejected by Ramgoolam, who called its system of "correctives" "a political rape of democracy"; on 14 June 1966 the Legislative Assembly carried his motion asking the Colonial Secretary to reconsider, by 32 votes to 18. The British minister John Stonehouse negotiated a compromise, announced on 4 July, under which eight "best loser" seats replaced the disputed correctives. The same year, in anticipation of independence, Ramgoolam decided to create a Mauritian diplomatic service. Unemployment was high, and Simmons describes growing disillusion with a government that was accused of patronage; Ramgoolam delayed the election until conditions improved, to the anger of the opposition.

For the election, Ramgoolam brought Labour, the IFB and the CAM together as the Independence Party, although, as Simmons observes, the communal alliance was distasteful to a leader who disliked communal politics. The election of 7 August 1967 was fought on the question of independence, against a PMSD campaign for association with Britain; Commonwealth observers judged it fair and free. The Independence Party won 39 of the 62 constituency seats and, after the allocation of best-loser seats, 43 of the 70 seats in the assembly, against 27 for the PMSD, with about 54 per cent of the vote. Ramgoolam topped the poll in the new constituency of Pamplemousses and Triolet with 8,917 votes. Two days after the poll, the Labour newspaper Advance referred to him for the first time as the "Father of the Nation".

Full internal self-government began on 12 August 1967, with Ramgoolam as Premier. On 22 August, at the first meeting of the new Legislative Assembly, he moved the resolution asking the British government "to give effect, as soon as practicable this year, to the desire of the people of Mauritius to accede to Independence within the Commonwealth of Nations". "We have striven for many years now to create a new sense of unity out of our rich diversity", he told the assembly, warning the opposition that it would "be accountable to History" for its decision. Supporting the motion, Veerasamy Ringadoo said that if anyone deserved to be called the Father of the Nation at independence, it was Ramgoolam. In October 1967 Ramgoolam led a delegation to London that agreed 12 March 1968 as the date of independence, and from 21 November 1967 he took the title of Prime Minister. (Note: Several later sources give 18 December 1967 for the change of title, or date it to independence on 12 March 1968; the official report for 1967 gives 21 November 1967.) During the debate on the Mauritius Independence Bill in the House of Commons in December 1967, members on both sides paid tribute to him; the Labour MP James Johnson called him "possibly the most statesmanlike leader I know of any young society".

Independence was preceded by violence. In January 1968 fighting between Creole and Muslim gangs in Port Louis spread, and after consulting Ramgoolam the governor declared a state of emergency, first in the east of the capital and on 22 January over the whole island; the two men agreed to ask for British troops, the first of whom arrived from Singapore the next day. By 29 January 24 people had been killed. In the House of Lords, ministers and peers praised both Ramgoolam and Duval for their efforts to end the riots. Ramgoolam refused to postpone the celebrations, citing the example of Jamaica, which had become independent with British troops present; Princess Alexandra's visit was cancelled on security advice, and Greenwood represented the British government. At noon on 12 March 1968, at the Champ de Mars in Port Louis, the flag of Mauritius was raised in place of the Union Jack, and Ramgoolam became the first Prime Minister of independent Mauritius. The same day he applied for membership of the United Nations, to which Mauritius was admitted on 24 April 1968. Bowman describes him at this moment as "a sober and cautious" leader whose capacity for negotiation and reconciliation was unmatched: "Because he had always eschewed overt communal appeals, nearly everyone in the society could be comfortable with Ramgoolam in a way that they could never be with Duval."

== Prime Minister (1968–1982) ==
Ramgoolam was 67 when Mauritius became independent and 81 when he left office. Bowman calls the period "the Ramgoolam era", in which the Labour leadership, "generally well-educated Anglophiles", remained committed to Fabian social democracy and to building a welfare state through a partnership of the public and private sectors.

=== Coalition with the PMSD ===
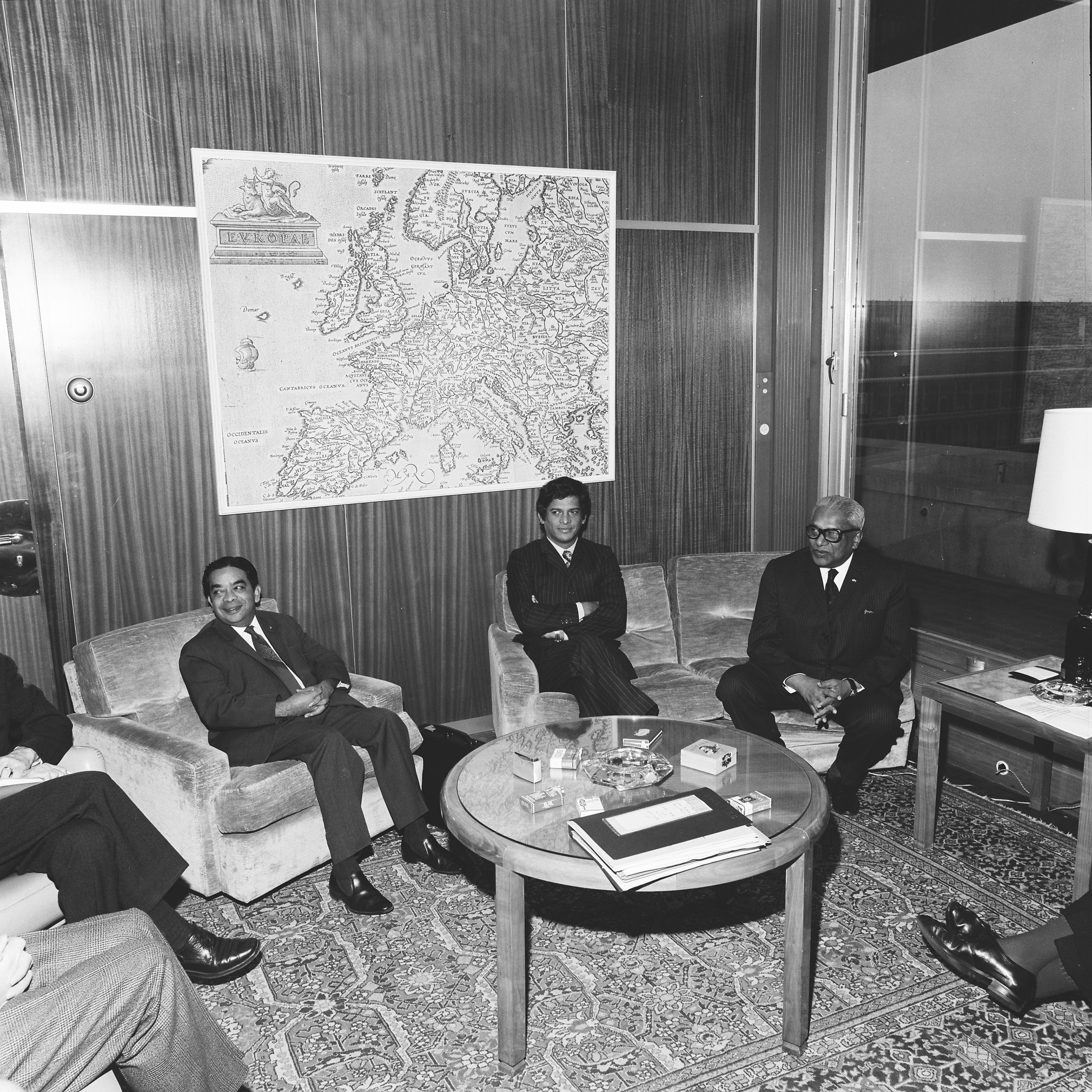
A Mauritian delegation led by Ramgoolam and including Gaëtan Duval at the European Commission in Brussels, 1970

Ramgoolam began independence at the head of an uneasy alliance of Labour, the IFB and the CAM. Early in 1969, after a clash with Sookdeo Bissoondoyal, he dismissed the IFB ministers, several of whose members of parliament then moved to the Labour Party. He then turned to his former opponents. After months of negotiation, in which Duval accompanied him on official visits abroad, Labour and the PMSD formed a coalition on 1 December 1969; the cabinet grew from ten to twenty-one ministers and Duval became Minister of External Affairs. Bowman attributes the coalition to Ramgoolam's view that economic development would be easier with a broadly based government; it brought into office the party that had led the opposition to independence. Its price was the postponement of the general election due in 1972 to 1976, decided by the legislature in 1969.

In style the two leaders were opposites: Ramgoolam "presented a cautious, paternal image", while Duval was flamboyant. With Duval at the foreign ministry, Mauritius pursued what the political scientist Philip M. Allen called a "double diplomatic track": Duval cultivated France, francophone Africa and South Africa, while Ramgoolam worked with the majority in the Organisation of African Unity (OAU), the Commonwealth and the Non-Aligned states and opened relations with the Soviet Union and China. In late 1970 Duval briefly resigned after Ramgoolam signed a four-year trade and fisheries agreement with the Soviet Union that gave Soviet trawlers facilities at Port Louis. In December 1973, after Duval opposed new taxes that Ramgoolam had proposed to pay for subsidies on imported food, and announced without authority that he was seeking a gift of rice from the European Economic Community, Ramgoolam dismissed him and the other PMSD ministers. About a dozen opposition members of parliament crossed the floor to support the government, and early in 1974 Ramgoolam took the foreign affairs portfolio himself.

=== The MMM and the state of emergency ===
The coalition was opposed from a new direction. Younger, well-educated Mauritians, "tired of the stranglehold that Ramgoolam and his supporters had kept on Mauritian politics since the 1950s", formed the Mouvement Militant Mauricien (MMM) under Paul Bérenger in 1969. On 21 September 1970 its candidate Dev Virahsawmy won a by-election in Pamplemousses–Triolet, Ramgoolam's own constituency, caused by the death of the sitting member Lall Jugnauth. Virahsawmy polled 8,464 votes to 3,103 for the Labour candidate, 71.5 per cent of the vote. The MMM went on to win the support of eleven unions, among them the dockers', bus and sugar-industry unions. A later constitutional amendment abolished by-elections, and none was held again until 1989. A Public Order Act gave the government powers to control public meetings, detain people without trial and restrict the press. (Note: Allen dates the act to December 1970. The Library of Congress country study calls it the Public Order Act of 1971, and a University of Central Arkansas chronology records its passage by 48 votes to 10 on 22 December 1971.) In December 1971, after a wave of strikes called by MMM-led unions, the government declared a state of emergency, suspended twelve trade unions, arrested union leaders, banned political meetings and closed the MMM newspaper Le Militant. Before Queen Elizabeth II's visit in March 1972, more than a hundred MMM members were detained; Bérenger, Virahsawmy and others remained in prison for the rest of the year without charge. Allen wrote that Ramgoolam was then "in personal charge of security determinations" and appeared to share the view that Mauritius was on the verge of revolution.

Ramgoolam defended the measures in the Legislative Assembly in 1973: "We cannot permit attempts to destroy democracy in this country and replace it by dictatorship. We cannot permit violence, sabotage, and subversion because these things will destroy the climate of confidence upon which our social development is founded." The state of emergency was renewed every six months until 1976, and the ban on political meetings was lifted on 25 November 1976, a month before the general election. The detained leaders were gradually released, their unions legalised again, and in 1974 the dockworkers returned to full work in exchange for a promised industrial relations law. Simmons notes that the MMM pledged to repeal the legislation Ramgoolam had introduced between 1969 and 1972 to strengthen the government's emergency and detention powers. Ramgoolam rejected proposals for a one-party state as "retrograde".

=== Economy ===
Bowman divides the economy of the Ramgoolam years into four phases: stagnation from 1968 to 1970; optimism and rapid growth from 1971 to 1977; a slowdown in 1978–1979, when the price of sugar fell and the balance of payments deteriorated; and, from late 1979, recession, inflation and rising unemployment, met by a structural adjustment programme agreed with the World Bank and the International Monetary Fund under which the rupee was twice devalued and public spending and wages were cut. In 1971 the World Bank estimated that more than 20 per cent of the labour force was unemployed. The government's Four-Year Plan for 1971–1975 aimed to eliminate unemployment by 1980, and a Development Works Corporation, set up in 1971, employed about 4,000 people in public works by the end of that year. The growth of the 1970s rested on three factors: a manufacturing sector built on export processing zones on terms favourable to foreign investors, a short boom in sugar prices, and foreign aid; 64,000 jobs were created between 1971 and 1977. The Export Processing Zones Act was passed at the end of 1970. The idea had been championed by the economist Edouard Lim Fat, and between 1971 and 1980 the number of firms in the zones rose from 9 to 101 and their workforce from 644 to 21,642.

Ramgoolam also secured access to the European market. Mauritius became the nineteenth associate of the European Economic Community under the Yaoundé Convention by an agreement signed at Port Louis on 12 May 1972, with Ramgoolam leading the negotiations. On 28 February 1975 he signed the Lomé Convention at Lomé, Togo. Its Sugar Protocol allowed Mauritius to export 487,200 tonnes of sugar a year to the Community at the European price, a guaranteed outlet whose value economists have estimated at an average of 5.4 per cent of GDP a year between 1977 and 2000. A cyclone in February 1975 destroyed about a third of the sugar crop.

In the crisis of 1979 Ramgoolam described Labour as "a moderate socialist party ... we have tried to work on a socialist basis, trying to build a welfare state, so that everybody gets a fair share of the distribution of national wealth". Simmons, writing at the end of his premiership, concluded that he had "much to be proud of — an electrification program, pension plans, a declining birthrate, periods of economic growth, and extraordinary educational programs", but that his government would be "hard pressed to provide new jobs, reduce inflation, and return the balance of payments to Mauritius's favor".

=== Welfare state and education ===
Ramgoolam said that in "education, social security, taxation and so on, I later tried to put into concrete form some of the principles and teachings of the Fabians". His governments maintained free and non-contributory health care, extended old-age pensions and social security benefits and subsidised staple foods. The Sir Seewoosagur Ramgoolam National Hospital at Pamplemousses, built with British funds, became the country's main hospital. Queen Elizabeth II inaugurated the University of Mauritius on 24 March 1972, and the Mahatma Gandhi Institute, established with Indian support to promote the study of Indian languages and culture, was opened by the Indian prime minister Indira Gandhi in 1976. Free secondary education, a promise Ramgoolam made at the last minute of the 1976 campaign to match the MMM's platform, was introduced in January 1977; the Labour newspaper Advance called it a "social revolution". Entry to the first year of secondary school rose from 16,000 in 1976 to 21,000 in 1977.

=== Foreign policy ===
Ramgoolam greeted by the Israeli prime minister David Ben-Gurion at Lod airport in the early 1960s

Ramgoolam's foreign policy was non-aligned but, in Bowman's words, "clearly pro-Western". He remained attached to Britain: when the British government closed its radar station in Mauritius in 1975, he said that Mauritius would "always look to Great Britain as a great bastion of democracy which we have always tried to emulate". At the same time Mauritius joined the OAU at independence, and during the visit of the Tanzanian president Julius Nyerere in 1974 Ramgoolam declared: "we belong to Africa, without in any way wrenching ourselves away from India and Europe ... We cannot be free if any of us remains in bondage." The OAU Council of Ministers met in Port Louis from 24 June 1976, followed by the 13th summit of heads of state from 2 to 6 July, which approved the Cultural Charter for Africa. Ramgoolam, as host, became chairman of the organisation until the Libreville summit of July 1977. When Israeli commandos raided Entebbe on 4 July, during the summit, he took the OAU's complaint of an "act of aggression" against Uganda to the UN Security Council. Addressing the OAU foreign ministers before the summit, he called for a unity that would make "the establishment of the United States of Africa" the continent's "great achievement". As chairman he intervened in the dispute between Kenya and Uganda and supported the African boycott of the 1976 Olympic Games over sporting links with South Africa. In October 1973 the General Assembly announced that he would receive the United Nations Prize in the Field of Human Rights for his work "in the protection and defence of an exemplary multiracial society", and in accepting it before the General Assembly he described Mauritius as "a remarkable model of a working multiracial and multicommunal state".

Relations with India were close. Indira Gandhi visited Mauritius in 1970 and 1976, and Ramgoolam made an official visit to India in April 1974. He chaired the first World Hindi Convention at Nagpur, and the second was held at the Mahatma Gandhi Institute in August 1976. He paid an official visit to China from 11 to 15 April 1972, holding talks with Premier Zhou Enlai; a joint communiqué establishing diplomatic relations was issued on the last day of the visit, and China agreed to lend money for a new airport project. He met President Richard Nixon in New York in September 1969, President Gerald Ford in the Oval Office on 30 September 1975, when they discussed the American base on Diego Garcia and the proposal to make the Indian Ocean a "zone of peace", and President Ronald Reagan on 16 October 1981. In London he held talks with Margaret Thatcher in February 1980 and during an official visit in February 1981, covering Diego Garcia, the sugar trade and British aid. He visited Tripoli in 1979.

Mauritius kept trading with South Africa, which supplied food and manufactured goods and sent tourists, while condemning apartheid. "We hate apartheid just like any other African country", Ramgoolam said soon after independence, "but business is, of course, a different matter"; in 1976 he said that he would apply sanctions against South Africa if the United Nations imposed them, as he did against Rhodesia. He withdrew Mauritius from a southern African regional tourism organisation in 1971 over a reported plan for a segregated hotel on the island, and in 1976 broke relations with Israel reluctantly. On Diego Garcia, he raised the expansion of the base at Non-Aligned conferences in Lima and Colombo as part of his campaign for an Indian Ocean zone of peace, but Bowman notes that the issue "was rarely discussed throughout the Ramgoolam years" until the MMM took it up and accused him of laxity. In 1972 his government accepted £650,000 from Britain in full discharge of its undertaking to meet the cost of resettling the displaced islanders. In October 1980, after the OAU had demanded the island's return, he told the UN General Assembly that Britain should "disband the British Indian Ocean Territory and allow Mauritius to come into its natural heritage as before its independence", and that "the United States should make arrangements directly with Mauritius for the continued use of the island for defence purposes".

=== 1976 election and the last government ===
At the general election of 20 December 1976, the first since independence, the MMM won 34 of the 70 seats with 40.1 per cent of the vote, the Independence Party 28 seats (37.2 per cent) and the PMSD 8 seats (16.5 per cent). Ten ministers lost their seats, as did Duval, Mohamed and Bissoondoyal, but Ramgoolam topped the poll in Pamplemousses–Triolet with 12,460 votes. The governor-general ruled that he could form a government, and on 28 December he renewed the coalition with the PMSD, which received four ministries, giving him a majority of two. "The majority of the electorate", he said, "have voted against abrupt and radical change." The Africa Contemporary Record credited "the shrewd political wisdom of its near-octogenarian Prime Minister" with keeping Labour in power.

His last government was weakened by economic crisis and internal dissent. A commission of inquiry headed by Justice V. J. P. Glover, appointed by Ramgoolam to investigate allegations of corruption, reported in May 1979 that there had been ministerial corruption, and two ministers resigned; the Labour dissident Harish Boodhoo, who had attacked the party's "cronyism, corruption, and elitism", was expelled with two colleagues in August 1979 and founded the Parti Socialiste Mauricien (PSM). (Note: The historian Sada Reddi dates the expulsion to July 1979.) In June 1981 Duval took the PMSD out of the government, but a group of PMSD members led by Eliézer François stayed and kept Ramgoolam in office. Simmons faulted Ramgoolam for failing to deal with his succession: "By postponing elections and failing to incorporate young Mauritians into his government, Ramgoolam made a classic management mistake".

For the general election of 11 June 1982 Ramgoolam led the Parti de l'Alliance Nationale, which joined Labour with the François group and a small Creole party, while Duval's PMSD stood separately. The alliance of the MMM and the PSM won all sixty seats on the island of Mauritius. Ramgoolam came fourth in Pamplemousses–Triolet with 10,575 votes (39.0 per cent), behind the three MMM–PSM candidates, ending a parliamentary career that had begun in 1940. "That's life", he said. "One must not complain. One must do what the people tell one to do. I willingly accept the verdict of the people." He announced his government's resignation and denied rumours that he would leave the country, and on 15 June 1982 Anerood Jugnauth was sworn in as prime minister. Bowman called the election "a powerful endorsement of the democratic process", and a 1988 survey of African politics noted that "the founding father, Seewoosagur Ramgoolam, lost gracefully to the opposition party".

== Governor-General and death (1982–1985) ==
Ramgoolam remained leader of the Labour Party for another year and a half after his defeat. Out of office, he gave evidence to the Legislative Assembly's select committee on the excision of the Chagos Archipelago, chaired by the MMM foreign minister Jean-Claude de L'Estrac, whose report appeared in 1983. He defended the choice he had made in 1965: "If I had to choose between independence and the ceding of Diego Garcia, I would have done again the same thing." The committee concluded that he had accepted the excision in principle because he felt he had no legal means of preventing the British government from using its powers under the Colonial Boundaries Act 1895.

When the MMM–PSM government split in 1983, Ramgoolam was among those who reminded Jugnauth that only the prime minister, not a party's politburo, could dismiss ministers. He backed the Militant Socialist Movement (MSM), which Jugnauth founded in April 1983, and for the general election of 21 August 1983 Labour joined the MSM, the PMSD and Boodhoo's PSM in an alliance, which pledged that Ramgoolam would become the first president if Mauritius became a republic. The alliance won 46 of the 70 seats. On 16 December 1983 Jugnauth moved a constitutional amendment to make Mauritius a republic within the Commonwealth, telling the Assembly that it was the wish of the nation that Ramgoolam become its first president. Paul Bérenger replied that the MMM was opposed neither to a republic nor to Ramgoolam personally, but the bill failed to obtain the three-quarters majority it required.

Ramgoolam was instead appointed Governor-General, the Queen's representative, on 28 December 1983, and moved into State House at Le Réduit. He gave up the leadership of the Labour Party, which passed to Satcam Boolell. The office was largely ceremonial, but he remained a close adviser to Jugnauth and a respected figure in national politics. His wife died at Le Réduit a few days after his installation, on 5 January 1984.

=== Death and funeral ===
The main gate of the botanic garden at Pamplemousses, where Ramgoolam was cremated and which was renamed after him in 1988

Ramgoolam had been ill for about a year when he died at Le Réduit on 15 December 1985, aged 85. He was still in office. (Note: The New York Times reported that he died at "his official residence in Port Louis". The Mauritius Museums Council and the Sir Seewoosagur Ramgoolam Botanic Garden Trust give Le Réduit (State House), the governor-general's residence.) The government declared three days of national mourning, and Jugnauth, who had been visiting London, returned home to lead the nation in mourning. Announcing his death, the acting governor-general, Chief Justice Sir Cassam Moollan, called him "one of the most illustrious sons, if not the most illustrious son, this country has produced". Moollan recalled that, when the independence constitution was drafted, Ramgoolam had insisted that civil liberties "should be specifically safeguarded and spelt out". L'Express published a 20-page memorial edition the next day.

On 16 December thousands of mourners filed past his body as it lay in state at Government House in Port Louis. After a state funeral he was cremated according to Hindu rites on 17 December 1985 in the botanical garden at Pamplemousses, which was later renamed after him. (Note: The New York Times reported that his ashes were to be scattered in the Ganges according to Hindu rite. L'Express later described his samadhi as the place where his ashes are kept.) According to the historian Chit Dukhira, India observed two days of national mourning.

The Legislative Assembly met in special session on 24 December 1985 to pay tribute to him. Jugnauth said that Ramgoolam had "never lost faith in the inherent good in man". The MMM, which controlled the municipal council of Port Louis, joined in the homage. Its acting leader, Jayen Cuttaree, listed his achievements in health, education, pensions and social security, and wrote that he had "towered above the politicians of his generation". Moollan acted as governor-general until Sir Veerasamy Ringadoo, Ramgoolam's long-serving finance minister, was appointed on 17 January 1986.

A samadhi, or funerary monument, stands on the spot where he was cremated, near the Château de Mon Plaisir. It was designed by the Mauritian artist and architect Marcel Lagesse. It is a fountain surmounted by a basalt sculpture of a lotus flower, inscribed "In beloved memory of the Father of the Nation". In 2022 the government placed it on the national heritage list, together with the samadhi of Anerood Jugnauth in the same garden.

== Personal life ==
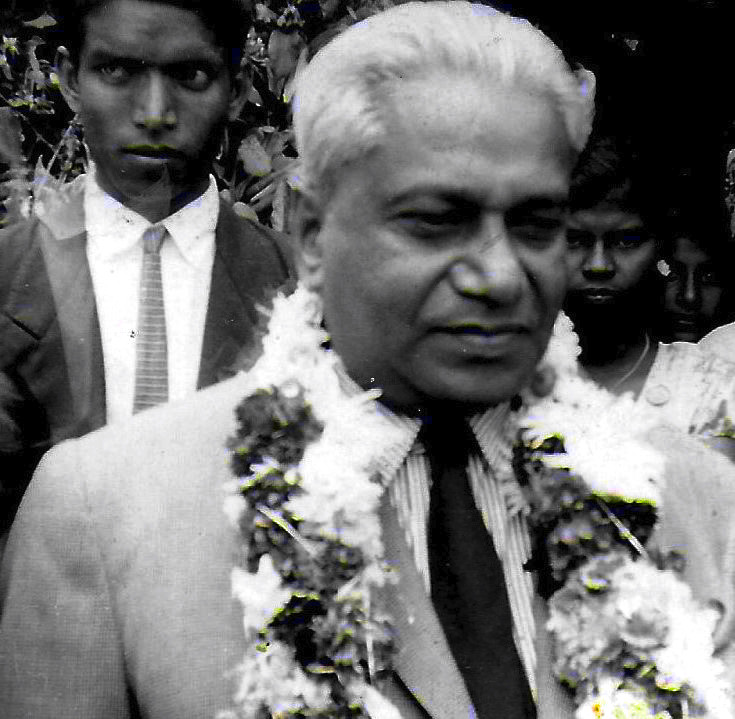
Ramgoolam with Pahlad Ramsurrun at the annual celebration of the Sainte-Croix Arya Samaj society in 1964

In 1941 Ramgoolam married Sushil Ramjoorawon (1922–1984), who came from Saint-Aubin, near Rivière des Anguilles in the south of the island. (Note: Some reference works give her name as Sahoduth.) They had two children: a son, Navinchandra (Navin), and a daughter, Sunita (Soonita Kumari), who married Vijay Joypaul. Sunita later recalled that, however busy her father was with politics, he always found time for his children; after independence both children went to Ireland to study, she in letters and he in medicine. Lady Ramgoolam suffered from heart disease and diabetes, and died at Le Réduit on 5 January 1984. Navin Ramgoolam later served as prime minister from 1995 to 2000 and from 2005 to 2014, and won a third term in 2024.

His house at 87 Desforges Street in Port Louis was full of books, and between 1940 and 1983 politicians of every party, other public figures and foreign visitors called there regularly. He was a Hindu, described by the historian Sada Reddi as deeply religious, and at home he spoke Bhojpuri with his wife and relatives. He was also a Freemason. According to Rivaltz Quenette's history of Mauritian freemasonry, he was initiated on 5 February 1938 in the lodge La Triple Espérance in Port Louis. On 24 November 1975 he affiliated to the Mozart lodge of the Grand Orient de France in Paris, and he later received the 33rd degree of the Ancient and Accepted Scottish Rite as an honour.

He knew by heart long passages of T. S. Eliot's The Waste Land and Four Quartets. His daughter remembered first editions of Eliot in the family library, among French, English and Indian authors. She also recalled his fondness for animals: turkeys given to the family as presents were kept as pets rather than eaten, and he had a dog injured by his chauffeur nursed and adopted by the household.

== Political views and leadership ==
Ramgoolam described Fabianism as the lasting framework of his politics. "Fabian Socialism suited my temperament and I have been a Fabian all my life, in my approach to politics, in my tactics and political philosophy", he wrote towards the end of his premiership, adding that the Fabian principle of "the correct timing", waiting for the right moment, had characterised his career; he also acknowledged that Marxism had left "a deep and everlasting impression" on his thinking as a student. Historians agree on the Fabian influence: Rivière wrote that his stay in Britain won him over to "the philosophy of the moderate socialist Fabian Society, which was later to determine Ramgoolam's governing policies". Allen summarised his programme as "independence first, social change later". As independence approached he moved Labour away from its programme of general nationalisation towards a mixed economy that would reassure the economically powerful minorities and discourage emigration, while encouraging private enterprise.

Contemporaries and historians repeatedly stressed his capacity for compromise. The Africa Contemporary Record in 1969 called him "shrewd, benign, conciliatory", and in 1987 "the conciliator and astute political craftsman". Rivière observed that for twenty years he had "talked almost all of his opponents into joining him in coalition governments", and that, portrayed in the 1960s as a dangerous left-winger, he became "a fatherly figure and a cementing force in the nation". Ringadoo, who sat in every Ramgoolam cabinet from 1959, recalled that he "did not suffer fools gladly", but always gave even obstructive colleagues a hearing and worked towards a consensus. Though his support was rooted in the Hindu majority, he disliked communal politics; Simmons notes that he did not run communal campaigns, and he advised Mauritians abroad "not to be too religious but to work more on a class basis and to co-operate with other communities".

At the same time he championed the cultural claims of Indo-Mauritians. In the Council of Government in 1941 he fought the colonial Director of Education's proposal to end the teaching of Hindi in state schools, arguing that Indians would cease to be Indians if their languages were not taught, and he led a walkout from a public talk by the director; according to the anthropologist Patrick Eisenlohr, he "played a crucial role in the establishment and expansion of Indian languages as regularly taught subjects in state schools". After independence his government greatly expanded the teaching of Hindi and other Indian languages, which Eisenlohr interprets as an attempt to correct the historic marginalisation of the Indo-Mauritian majority, a policy popular with Hindu voters.

== Legacy ==
=== "Father of the Nation" ===
Ramgoolam is widely known in Mauritius as the "Father of the Nation". The Labour newspaper Advance first gave him the title on 9 August 1967, two days after the independence election, and during the independence debate later that month Ringadoo told the Legislative Assembly that Ramgoolam would deserve it. In 1983 Prime Minister Jugnauth, proposing that he become the first president of a Mauritian republic, described him as "commonly known as Father of the Nation". Bowman calls him "the father of independence", and the Africa Contemporary Record described him at his death as "the father of modern Mauritius". The title is now in official use. It is inscribed on his samadhi, the Mauritius Museums Council uses it, and the Bank of Mauritius named a series of platinum coins issued from 2009 the "Father of the Nation" series. The affectionate chacha ("uncle") also remained in use.

=== Historical assessments ===
Historians credit Ramgoolam with leading Mauritius to independence while holding together a divided society. Bowman wrote that "as the prime actor in the emergence of Indo-Mauritians to political prominence, as the father of independence, and as the guiding figure as postindependence patterns and traditions were set, Ramgoolam deserves much praise". He also quoted V. S. Naipaul's judgement that "few colonial leaders have shown such courage and tenacity as Ramgoolam; few, having achieved power, have been so anxious to heal old enmities and rule humanely". His "steady support of the welfare state, a mixed economy, and a nonaligned but clearly pro-Western foreign policy, and his willingness to abide by the results of the democratic process", Bowman concluded, "produced legacies that subsequent leaders have followed". Rivière credited his "moderate, middle-of-the-road, and tolerant policies" with uniting "an otherwise divided country" and maintaining a democratic parliamentary system after independence. The French jurist Louis Favoreu wrote that, skilful and tenacious, he kept his people united and helped a Mauritian nation to emerge, a nation of which he had become the symbol by the end of his life. Simmons observed that "however distasteful Ramgoolam may have been to the Creoles and the Franco-Mauritians, almost all of them knew someone who knew and thought well of him", an interdependence that helped the Franco-Mauritian elite yield its political dominance peacefully. Even his principal opponent of the 1970s, Paul Bérenger, paid tribute to his moderation and pragmatism.

Assessments also record failures. Bowman notes that his moderation "was not without its costs", since in his later years his government "did not easily confront difficult problems". Simmons criticised his neglect of the succession and his postponement of elections. Allen described the security measures of 1970–1971, which led to the detention without charge of opposition leaders and the closure of Le Militant, as "transgressions of the civil process by a frightened regime". The agreement to detach the Chagos Archipelago remains the most contested part of his record. The opposition accused him of trading the islands for independence, and Bowman notes that his government did little for the displaced Chagossians until the issue became an electoral liability in 1982. The British records of 1965, produced as evidence in the later litigation, changed the terms of that debate: they show that Britain was prepared to detach the islands without Mauritian consent. In 2015 two of the arbitrators in Mauritius v. United Kingdom held that Ramgoolam had been subjected to duress, and in 2019 the International Court of Justice found that the detachment had not reflected the free will of the people of Mauritius (see above). Simmons wrote that by 1966 "corruption and patronage were flagrant", and in 1979 a commission he appointed confirmed ministerial corruption. A history essay in Le Mauricien in 2015 went further, calling him "a colonial collaborator and a compromiser on Chagos" whose government had entrenched patronage and floor-crossing in Mauritian politics.

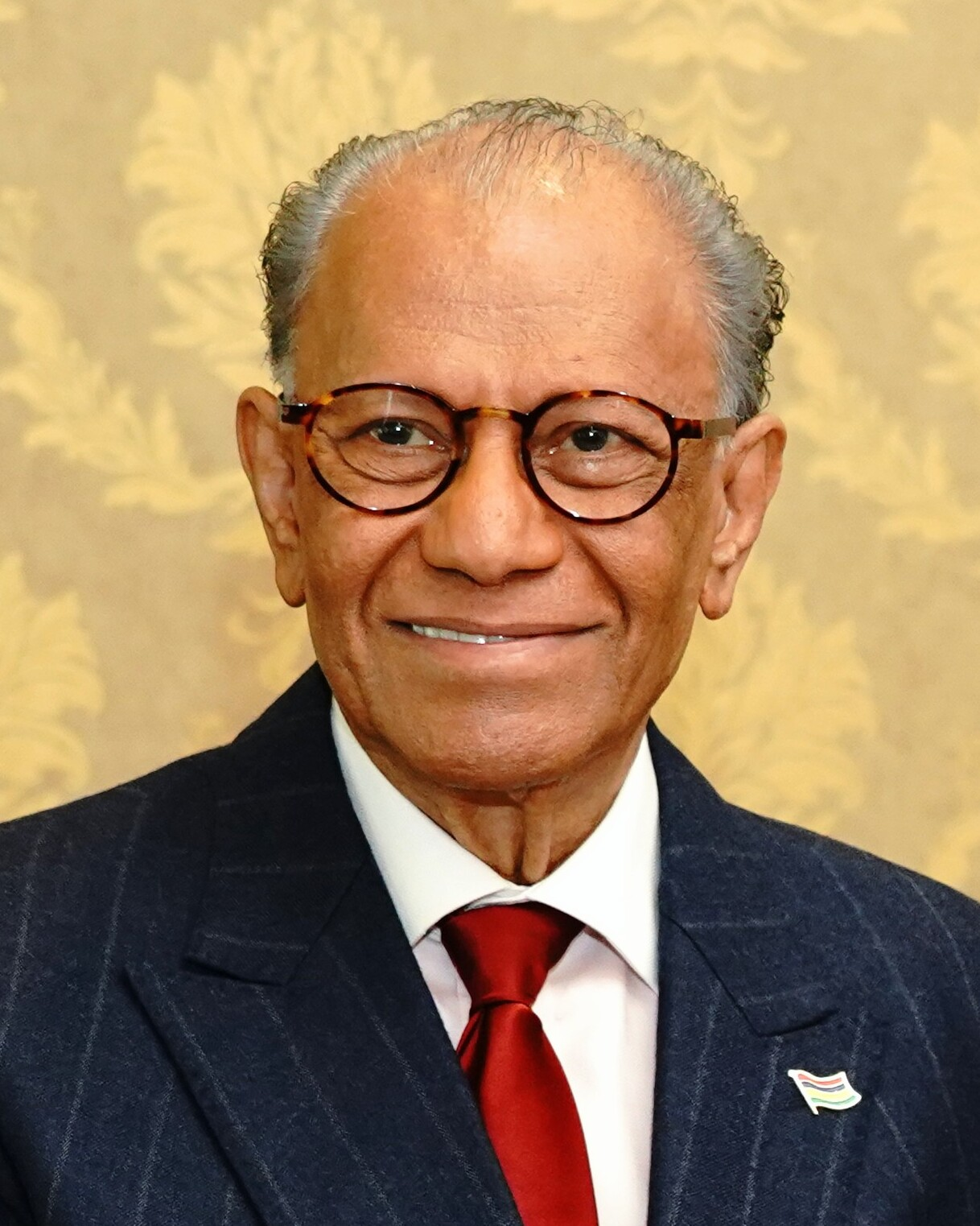
His son Navin Ramgoolam, prime minister in 1995–2000, 2005–2014 and again from 2024

In Mauritius his standing remained high after his death. In a survey published in 1993 he was still ranked the most popular Mauritian politician, ahead of the serving prime minister. In 1999 a poll reported by L'Express named him the Mauritian personality of the century. Ringadoo, his long-time finance minister, said that "even his worst detractors have to accept that the heritage left was more than any other Mauritian had achieved within a period of four decades of political activities". His family has remained at the centre of national politics. His son Navin has been prime minister three times, and commentators note that since independence Mauritius has been led by members of only a few families, above all the Ramgoolams and the Jugnauths.

=== Memorials and commemorations ===
The Sir Seewoosagur Ramgoolam Botanical Garden at Pamplemousses, renamed after him in 1988

Many places and institutions in Mauritius bear Ramgoolam's name. The national hospital at Pamplemousses was named after him while he was prime minister, and it was opened in his presence on 20 August 1969. After his death the government bought his house in Desforges Street. It was declared a national monument on 8 September 1986 and opened as the Sir Seewoosagur Ramgoolam Memorial Centre for Culture on his birthday, 18 September 1987, and the street itself now bears his name. In 1987 the international airport at Plaisance was renamed Sir Seewoosagur Ramgoolam International Airport. On 18 September 1988 the botanic garden at Pamplemousses, where he had been cremated, was renamed the Sir Seewoosagur Ramgoolam Botanic Garden. A statue of him on the Port Louis Waterfront was designated national heritage in 2008, and a memorial park with a bust of him stands at Kewal Nagar, his birthplace. In India, a statue of him stands at the Gandhi Maidan in Patna, the capital of Bihar.

His birthday, 18 September, is marked each year with wreath-laying ceremonies at his samadhi, at the Waterfront statue and at Kewal Nagar, and many people, his children among them, visit the samadhi on the anniversary of his death. Visiting leaders have laid wreaths at the samadhi, among them the Indian presidents K. R. Narayanan in 2001 and Pranab Mukherjee in 2013, Modi in 2025, and the Seychelles president Patrick Herminie, guest of honour at the National Day of 2026. A columnist in Le Mauricien observed in 2026 that Ramgoolam and Anerood Jugnauth are the only political figures commemorated at national level, and that the scale of the celebrations for each depends largely on the government of the day.

His portrait has appeared on Mauritian banknotes, coins and postage stamps:

Ramgoolam on Mauritian currency and stamps
Year	Item	Notes	Ref.
1973	Postage stamp	Fifth anniversary of independence, issued 10 April 1973	
1978	Postage stamp	Tenth anniversary of independence, issued 12 March 1978	
1980	Postage stamp	His 80th birthday and 40 years as a parliamentarian, issued 18 September 1980	
1985	200-rupee banknote	Issued on his 85th birthday, 18 September 1985; the reverse shows the Château de Réduit	
1998	Postage stamp	30th anniversary of independence, issued 12 March 1998	
1998, 1999	2,000-rupee banknote	Issued 30 October 1998 and, in a new issue, 30 June 1999	
2007	20-rupee coin	Bimetallic circulating coin, issued from 7 December 2007	
2008	1,000-rupee gold coin	40th anniversary of independence, issued from 16 September 2008	
2009–2011	"Father of the Nation" platinum coins	Three coins, one a year, from 30 October 2009	
2018	2,000-rupee polymer banknote	Issued from 5 December 2018, with almost the same design as the paper note	
2025	60-rupee postage stamp	125th anniversary of his birth, issued 18 September 2025	

== Honours and awards ==
Honours and awards of Sir Seewoosagur Ramgoolam
Year	Honour or award	Conferred by	Ref.
1965	Knight Bachelor	Elizabeth II (1965 Birthday Honours; dubbed 18 September 1965)	
1969	Honorary Freeman (Citoyen d'honneur) of Port Louis	Municipal Council of Port Louis	
1971	Privy Counsellor (1971 Birthday Honours)	Elizabeth II	
1973	Grand Officer of the Legion of Honour (presented in Paris by the French prime minister, Pierre Messmer, on 17 October 1973)	France	
1973	United Nations Prize in the Field of Human Rights (announced 26 October 1973)	United Nations General Assembly	
1974	Honorary Doctor of Civil Law, the first honorary degree awarded by the university	University of Mauritius	
1978	Knight Grand Cross of the Order of St Michael and St George (GCMG; 1978 Birthday Honours, Mauritius list)	Elizabeth II, on the advice of her Mauritian ministers	
	Grand Cross of the National Order of Madagascar	Madagascar	
	Grand Cross of the National Order of the Lion	Senegal	
	Grand Cross of the Order of Merit	Central African Republic	
	Medal of the French National Assembly	France	
	Honorary Doctor of Laws	University of Delhi	
	Fellow	University College London	

== Works ==
- Ramgoolam, Seewoosagur (1979). Hazareesingh, K. (ed.). Selected Speeches of Sir Seewoosagur Ramgoolam. London: Macmillan. – speeches from 1941 to 1976.
- Ramgoolam, Seewoosagur (1982). Our Struggle: 20th Century Mauritius. Presented by Anand Mulloo. New Delhi: Vision Books. – Ramgoolam's own account of the struggle for independence.
- Ramgoolam, Seewoosagur (1982). Mulloo, Anand (ed.). Our Freedom. New Delhi: Vision Books.

== See also ==
- History of Mauritius
- Independence of Mauritius
- Detachment of the Chagos Archipelago
- Chagos Archipelago sovereignty dispute
- Expulsion of the Chagossians
- Sir Seewoosagur Ramgoolam Botanical Garden
- Sir Seewoosagur Ramgoolam International Airport

== Sources ==
=== Books ===
- Addison, John; Hazareesingh, K. (1984). A New History of Mauritius. London: Macmillan. ISBN 0-333-34026-4.
- Allen, Philip M. (1975). "Mauritius: The Ile de France Returns". In Ostheimer, John M. (ed.). The Politics of the Western Indian Ocean Islands. New York: Praeger. pp. 197–226. ISBN 0-275-28839-0.
- Bennett, Pramila Ramgulam (1992). Mauritius. World Bibliographical Series. Vol. 140. Oxford: Clio Press. ISBN 1-85109-153-X.
- Bowman, Larry W. (1991). Mauritius: Democracy and Development in the Indian Ocean. Boulder, Colorado: Westview Press. ISBN 0-8133-0508-X.
- Cheng, Peter (1986). Chronology of the People's Republic of China, 1970–1979. Metuchen, New Jersey: Scarecrow Press. ISBN 0-8108-1751-9.
- Dukhira, Chit G. (2002). History of Mauritius: Experiments in Democracy. Quatre Bornes: C. Dukhira. ISBN 99903-970-0-7.
- Eisenlohr, Patrick (2006). Little India: Diaspora, Time, and Ethnolinguistic Belonging in Hindu Mauritius. Berkeley: University of California Press. ISBN 0-520-24879-1.
- Mannick, A. R. (1987). Mauritians in London. Mayfield, Sussex: Dodo Books. ISBN 0-9512546-0-X.
- Metz, Helen Chapin, ed. (1995). Indian Ocean: Five Island Countries. Area Handbook Series (3rd ed.). Washington, D.C.: Federal Research Division, Library of Congress.
- Rothchild, Donald; Chazan, Naomi, eds. (1988). The Precarious Balance: State and Society in Africa. Boulder, Colorado: Westview Press. ISBN 0-86531-738-0.
- Simmons, Adele Smith (1982). Modern Mauritius: The Politics of Decolonization. Bloomington: Indiana University Press. ISBN 0-253-38658-6.
- Tinker, Hugh (1977). The Banyan Tree: Overseas Emigrants from India, Pakistan, and Bangladesh. Oxford: Oxford University Press. ISBN 0-19-215946-1.
- Varma, Moonindra Nath (2008). The Making of Mauritius. Vacoas: Éditions Le Printemps. ISBN 978-99903-87-62-9.

=== Reference works and yearbooks ===
- Africa South of the Sahara 1978–79. London: Europa Publications. 1978.
- Debrett's Handbook 1984. London: Debrett's Peerage. 1984. ISBN 0-905649-68-0.
- Legum, Colin; Drysdale, John, eds. (1969). Africa Contemporary Record: Annual Survey and Documents 1968–1969. London: Africa Research Limited.
- Legum, Colin, ed. (1977). Africa Contemporary Record: Annual Survey and Documents, Volume 9: 1976–77. New York: Africana Publishing Company. ISBN 0-8419-0158-9.
- Legum, Colin, ed. (1987). Africa Contemporary Record: Annual Survey and Documents, Volume 18: 1985–1986. New York: Africana Publishing Company.
- The International Year Book and Statesmen's Who's Who 1981. East Grinstead: Kelly's Directories. 1981. ISBN 0-610-00542-1.
- Legum, Colin, ed. (1966). Africa: A Handbook to the Continent. New York: Praeger.
- Lentz, Harris M. (1994). Heads of States and Governments: A Worldwide Encyclopedia of Over 2,300 Leaders, 1945 through 1992. Jefferson, North Carolina: McFarland. ISBN 0-89950-926-6.
- Rivière, Lindsay (1982). Historical Dictionary of Mauritius. African Historical Dictionaries. Vol. 34. Metuchen, New Jersey: Scarecrow Press. ISBN 0-8108-1479-X.

=== Official documents and records ===
- "125th Birth Anniversary of Sir Seewoosagur Ramgoolam (1900–2025)". Mauritius Post. 18 September 2025.
- "66. Mauritius (1968–present)". Dynamic Analysis of Dispute Management Project. University of Central Arkansas. Archived from the original on 5 June 2024.
- "About Sir Seewoosagur Ramgoolam". Sir Seewoosagur Ramgoolam Botanic Garden Trust.
- "About the Garden". Sir Seewoosagur Ramgoolam Botanic Garden Trust.
- Agreement between the Government of the United Kingdom of Great Britain and Northern Ireland and the Government of the Republic of Mauritius concerning the Chagos Archipelago including Diego Garcia (CS Mauritius No.1/2025, CP 1334) (Report). Foreign, Commonwealth and Development Office. 22 May 2025.
- Anglo/US Consultations on the Indian Ocean: November 1975, Agenda Item III, Brief No. 4: Future of Aldabra, Farquhar and Desroches (PDF). Foreign and Commonwealth Office. November 1975 – via MM Annex 75.
- Bank of Mauritius. "Virtual Museum: Bank Notes".
- Bank of Mauritius (6 December 2007). "Issue of a 20 Rupee Bi-metal Coin" (PDF) (Press release).
- Bank of Mauritius (16 September 2008). "Issue of Commemorative Coins: 40th Anniversary of the Independence of Mauritius" (PDF) (Press release).
- Bank of Mauritius (30 October 2009). "Issue of the 'Father of the Nation' Platinum Coin Series" (PDF) (Press release).
- Bank of Mauritius (4 December 2018). "Public Notice: Rs 2000 Denomination Banknotes" (PDF) (Press release) – via Mauritius Chamber of Commerce and Industry.
- British Indian Ocean Territory: The Ex-Seychelles Islands – Memorandum by the Secretary of State for Foreign and Commonwealth Affairs, OPD(75)23 (PDF). Cabinet, Defence and Oversea Policy Committee. 4 July 1975. TNA FCO 40/674 – via MM Annex 72.
- "C04561 (02): Meeting with Prime Minister Ramgoolam of Mauritius, Oval Office, 16 October 1981". White House Photo Collection. Ronald Reagan Presidential Library.
- Chagos Islanders v Attorney General and HM BIOT Commissioner, EWHC (QB) 2222 (High Court 9 October 2003).
- Chagos Islanders v Attorney General and HM BIOT Commissioner, EWCA Civ 997 (Court of Appeal 22 July 2004).
- Colonial Office (1962). Mauritius: Report for the Year 1961. Colonial Reports. London: HMSO.
- Colonial Office (1963). Mauritius: Report for the Year 1962. Colonial Reports. London: HMSO.
- Colonial Office (1965). Mauritius: Report for the Year 1963. Colonial Reports. London: HMSO.
- Colonial Office (1966). Mauritius: Report for the Year 1964. Colonial Reports. London: HMSO.
- Colonial Office (1967). Mauritius: Report for the Year 1965. Colonial Reports. London: HMSO.
- Colonial Office (1968). Mauritius: Report for the Year 1966. Colonial Reports. London: HMSO.
- Colonial Office (1949). Annual Report on Mauritius for the Year 1947. Colonial Reports. London: HMSO.
- Colonial Office (1949). Annual Report on Mauritius for the Year 1948. Colonial Reports. London: HMSO.
- Colonial Office (1954). Report on Mauritius for the Year 1953. Colonial Reports. London: HMSO.
- Colonial Office (1957). Report on Mauritius for the Year 1955. Colonial Reports. London: HMSO.
- Colonial Office (1957). Report on Mauritius for the Year 1956. Colonial Reports. London: HMSO.
- Colonial Office (1959). Report on Mauritius for the Year 1957. Colonial Reports. London: HMSO.
- Colonial Office (1959). Report on Mauritius for the Year 1958. Colonial Reports. London: HMSO.
- Colonial Office (1961). Report on Mauritius for the Year 1959. Colonial Reports. London: HMSO.
- Colonial Office (1961). Report on Mauritius for the Year 1960. Colonial Reports. London: HMSO.
- Colonial Office Telegram No. 198 to Mauritius, No. 219 to Seychelles (PDF). 19 July 1965. TNA FO 371/184526 – via MM Annex 10.
- Commission of the European Communities (27 March 1972). Mauritius: The Latest Yaoundé Associate (PDF) (Report). Information: Development Aid. No. 12/72.
- Commission of the European Communities (1979). Mauritius and the Lomé Convention (PDF) (Report). Europe Information: Development.
- Defence Facilities in the Indian Ocean: Memorandum by the Deputy Secretary of State for Defence and the Parliamentary Under-Secretary of State for Foreign Affairs, OPD(65)124 (PDF). Cabinet, Defence and Oversea Policy Committee. 26 August 1965 – via ICJ Annex 48.
- Disposition of the Seychelles Islands of the BIOT (PDF). Office of International Security Operations, Bureau of Politico-Military Affairs, United States Department of State. 31 October 1975 – via MM Annex 74.
- Exchange of notes constituting an agreement between the Government of the United Kingdom of Great Britain and Northern Ireland and the Government of the United States of America concerning the availability for defence purposes of the British Indian Ocean Territory. London, 30 December 1966 (No. 8737) (PDF). United Nations Treaty Series. Vol. 603. United Nations. 1967. pp. 273–290. Also published as UK Treaty Series No. 15 (1967), Cmnd 3231; 18 UST 28; TIAS 6196.
- Fairclough, A. J. (22 May 1967). Minute from A. J. Fairclough, Colonial Office, to a Minister of State, with a Draft Minute for the Secretary of State for Commonwealth Affairs addressed to the Foreign Secretary (PDF). TNA FCO 16/226 – via MM Annex 49.
- Foreign and Commonwealth Office (1970). Mauritius: Report for the Year 1967. London: HMSO.
- "Fourth Supplement to the London Gazette of 2 June 1978 (Mauritius)". The London Gazette. 3 June 1978. p. 6275.
- "France: Mauritius Prime Minister Made A Grand Officer Of The Legion D'Honneur. 1973". British Pathé (Reuters newsreel). 1973. Archived from the original on 27 November 2018.
- Greenwood, Anthony (5 November 1965). Minute from the Secretary of State for the Colonies to the Prime Minister (PDF). TNA FO 371/184529 – via MM Annex 26.
- Heads of Agreement between the Government of the United Kingdom, the Administration of the British Indian Ocean Territory and the Government of Seychelles concerning the Return of Aldabra, Desroches and Farquhar to Seychelles to be Executed on Independence Day (PDF). 18 March 1976. TNA FCO 40/732 – via MM Annex 79.
- Hunt, John (14 July 1975). British Indian Ocean Territory: The Ex-Seychelles Islands (OPD(75)23): briefing note to the Prime Minister (PDF). TNA PREM 16/2264 – via MM Annex 73.
- In the Matter of the Chagos Marine Protected Area Arbitration (Mauritius v. United Kingdom): Award (PDF). Permanent Court of Arbitration. 18 March 2015.
- Inter-Parliamentary Union. "Mauritius: Date of Elections: December 20, 1976" (PDF). Chronicle of Parliamentary Elections and Developments. Vol. XI. Geneva: Inter-Parliamentary Union. pp. 113–115.
- Inter-Parliamentary Union. "Mauritius: Date of Elections: 11 June 1982" (PDF). Chronicle of Parliamentary Elections and Developments. Vol. XVI. Geneva: Inter-Parliamentary Union. pp. 97–98.
- International Labour Organization (1998). "Chapter 2". Labour and Social Issues Relating to Export Processing Zones (Report). Geneva: International Labour Office.
- Kateka, James; Wolfrum, Rüdiger (18 March 2015). Dissenting and Concurring Opinion of Judge James Kateka and Judge Rüdiger Wolfrum. Permanent Court of Arbitration.
- Legal Consequences of the Separation of the Chagos Archipelago from Mauritius in 1965, Advisory Opinion (PDF). I.C.J. Reports 2019. International Court of Justice. 25 February 2019. p. 95.
- Lublin, David. "Mauritius". Election Passport. American University.
- "Mauritius". Hansard, House of Commons. 30 January 1968.
- "Mauritius". Hansard, House of Commons. 8 March 1968.
- "Mauritius (State of Emergency)". Hansard, House of Commons. 23 January 1968.
- "Mauritius (written answer)". Hansard, House of Commons. 24 October 1967.
- Mauritius Constitutional Conference Report 1965 (PDF). Colonial Office. 24 September 1965. Cmnd. 2797 – via Written Statement of the Republic of Mauritius (ICJ), Vol. III, Annex 64.
- "Mauritius Independence Bill". Hansard, House of Commons. 14 December 1967.
- "Mauritius Independence Bill". Hansard, House of Lords. 13 February 1968.
- Mauritius Legislative Assembly, Reply to PQ No. B/1141 (PDF). 25 November 1980 – via MM Annex 96.
- Mauritius Telegram No. 170 to the Colonial Office (PDF). 23 July 1965. TNA FO 371/184526 – via MM Annex 12.
- Memorandum of Conversation: President Ford, Prime Minister Seewoosagur Ramgoolam of Mauritius (PDF) (Report). National Security Adviser's Memoranda of Conversation Collection, Gerald R. Ford Presidential Library. 30 September 1975.
- Minutes of a Meeting held at 10 Downing Street on Tuesday, 31st August, 1965, OPD(65) 37th Meeting (PDF). Cabinet, Defence and Oversea Policy Committee. 31 August 1965. TNA CAB 148/18 – via ICJ Annex 51.
- Minutes of Anglo-US Talks on the Indian Ocean held on 7 November 1975 (extract) (PDF). British Embassy, Washington. November 1975 – via MM Annex 76.
- "Monuments & Samadhi". Sir Seewoosagur Ramgoolam Botanic Garden Trust.
- "National Heritage Fund (Amendment of Schedule) Regulations 2008" (PDF). Government Gazette of Mauritius. 18 September 2008. Government Notice No. 191 of 2008 – via FAOLEX.
- Note for the Prime Minister's Meeting with Sir Seewoosagur Ramgoolam, Premier of Mauritius, with covering note by the Private Secretary and minute by the Colonial Secretary (PDF). Colonial Office. 22 September 1965. TNA PREM 13/3320 – via MM Annex 17.
- Office of the Electoral Commissioner. "Results of the Legislative Assembly By-Election held on 21st September 1970: Constituency of Pamplemousses and Triolet". Government of Mauritius.
- Office of the Electoral Commissioner. "General Election held on 11 June 1982: Detailed Results". Government of Mauritius.
- Office of the Electoral Commissioner. "By-Elections". Government of Mauritius.
- Organisation of African Unity (July 1976). Resolutions adopted by the Assembly of Heads of State and Government, Thirteenth Ordinary Session, Port Louis, Mauritius, 2–6 July 1976 (PDF) (Report). AHG/Res. 79–83 (XIII).
- "PM lays wreath at Samadhis of Sir Seewoosagur Ramgoolam and Sir Anerood Jugnauth". Prime Minister's Office, Government of India. 11 March 2025.
- "PM's address to the Indian Community in Mauritius". Prime Minister's Office, Government of India. 11 March 2025.
- "PREM19/1310: Mauritius (Visits to UK by Prime Ministers Sir Seewoosagur Ramgoolam and Anerood Jugnauth: meetings with Prime Minister)". Margaret Thatcher Foundation.
- R (Bancoult) v Secretary of State for Foreign and Commonwealth Affairs, EWHC (Admin) 1038 (High Court (Divisional Court) 11 May 2006).
- Record of a Conversation between the Prime Minister and the Premier of Mauritius, Sir Seewoosagur Ramgoolam, at No. 10, Downing Street, at 10 a.m. on Thursday, 23 September 1965 (PDF). 23 September 1965. TNA FO 371/184528 – via MM Annex 18.
- Record of Conversation between the Parliamentary Under-Secretary of State for Foreign and Commonwealth Affairs and the Mauritius High Commissioner, London (PDF). 8 March 1976. TNA FCO 40/731 – via MM Annex 77.
- Report of the Select Committee on the Excision of the Chagos Archipelago (PDF) (Report). Mauritius Legislative Assembly. June 1983 – via MM Annex 97 (extract).
- Rowlands, Ted (15 March 1976). Letter from the Parliamentary Under-Secretary of State, Foreign and Commonwealth Office, to the Mauritius High Commissioner, London (PDF). TNA FCO 40/732 – via MM Annex 78.
- "Stamp Collection". Birth Centenary Celebrations of Sir Seewoosagur Ramgoolam. Ministry of Arts and Culture, Government of Mauritius. Archived from the original on 27 August 2011.
- "Stamp issues related to the 75th anniversary: Mauritius". The Postal History of ICAO. International Civil Aviation Organization. Archived from the original on 12 September 2024.
- "Supplement to the London Gazette, 12 June 1971 (Birthday Honours: Privy Counsellors)". The London Gazette. 12 June 1971. p. 5957.
- "Supplement to the London Gazette, 21 September 1965". The London Gazette. 21 September 1965. p. 8899.
- "Supplement to the London Gazette, 4 June 1965 (Birthday Honours)". The London Gazette. 12 June 1965. p. 5472.
- "The Lomé Convention" (PDF). The Courier. No. 31 (special issue). Commission of the European Communities. March 1975.
- "The President Lays Wreath At Samadhi Of Sir Seewoosagur Ramgoolam". President of India. 12 March 2013.
- "The President of India, Shri K R Narayanan laying the wreath at the Samadhi of Sir Seewoosagur Ramgoolam". Digital Photo Library. Rashtrapati Bhavan. 11 March 2001.
- U.S. Defence Interests in the Indian Ocean: Memorandum by the Foreign Office, the Colonial Office and the Ministry of Defence, D.O.(O)(64)23 (PDF). Cabinet, Defence and Oversea Policy (Official) Committee. 23 April 1964. TNA FCO 31/3437 – via ICJ Annex 26.
- UK Mission to the United Nations, New York, Telegram No. 2972 to the Foreign Office (PDF). 16 November 1965 – via MM Annex 36.
- United Nations (1968). Mauritius: Declaration of acceptance of the obligations contained in the Charter of the United Nations (PDF). United Nations Treaty Series (Report). Vol. 634. p. 218. No. 9064.
- United Nations General Assembly (26 October 1973). Twenty-eighth session, 2157th plenary meeting, 26 October 1973 (Report). A/PV.2157.
- United Nations General Assembly (9 October 1980). Thirty-fifth session, 30th plenary meeting, 9 October 1980 (Report). A/35/PV.30.
- United Nations General Assembly (24 May 2019). Resolution adopted by the General Assembly on 22 May 2019: 73/295. Advisory opinion of the International Court of Justice on the legal consequences of the separation of the Chagos Archipelago from Mauritius in 1965 (A/RES/73/295) (Report). United Nations.
- United Nations General Assembly (22 June 2017). Resolution adopted by the General Assembly on 22 June 2017: 71/292. Request for an advisory opinion of the International Court of Justice on the legal consequences of the separation of the Chagos Archipelago from Mauritius in 1965 (A/RES/71/292) (Report). United Nations.
- United Nations General Assembly (16 December 1965). "2066 (XX). Question of Mauritius". Resolutions adopted by the General Assembly during its twentieth session. Official Records of the General Assembly, Twentieth Session, Supplement No. 14 (A/6014) – via Memorial of Mauritius, Annex 38.
- United Nations Security Council (9 July 1976). 1939th meeting, 9 July 1976 (Report). S/PV.1939.
- University of Mauritius. "Introduction" (PDF). Regulations 2018/2019.
- "Visits By Foreign Leaders of Mauritius". Office of the Historian. United States Department of State.
- World Bank (24 October 1972). Mauritius: 4-Year Development Plan, an Assessment, Volume I (PDF) (Report). Report No. AE-30a.
- World Bank (28 February 1978). Staff Appraisal Report: A Second Education Project in Mauritius (PDF) (Report). Report No. 1825-MAS.
- Written Statement of the United Kingdom (PDF). International Court of Justice. 15 February 2018.

=== Journal articles ===
- Claveyrolas, Mathieu (2015). "The 'Land of the Vaish'? Caste Structure and Ideology in Mauritius". South Asia Multidisciplinary Academic Journal. doi:10.4000/samaj.3886.
- Neveling, Patrick. "Genealogies of a Miracle: A Historical Anthropology of the Mauritian Export Processing Zone" (PDF). Bournemouth University (author's final version).
- Subramanian, Arvind; Roy, Devesh (2001). "Who Can Explain the Mauritian Miracle: Meade, Romer, Sachs, or Rodrik?". IMF Working Papers. International Monetary Fund. WP/01/116.

=== News, web and other sources ===
- "103e anniversaire de la naissance de Lady Sushil Ramgoolam – Sunita Ramgoolam : « Maman serait fière de Navin »" [103rd anniversary of Lady Sushil Ramgoolam's birth – Sunita Ramgoolam: "Mum would be proud of Navin"]. Defimedia (in French). 2 October 2025.
- "125e anniversaire de sa naissance : l'héritage toujours vivant de Sir Seewoosagur Ramgoolam" [125th anniversary of his birth: the living legacy of Sir Seewoosagur Ramgoolam]. Defimedia (in French). 18 September 2025.
- Bhuckory, Sanjay (18 September 2020). "SSR and I". Le Mauricien.
- Bloomberg (11 November 2024). "Dynasties battle to lead Mauritius with democracy out of favour". Daily Maverick.
- Boolell, Shakuntala (18 December 2016). "SSR meurt le 15 décembre – un tour d'horizon" [SSR dies on 15 December: an overview]. Mauritius Times (in French).
- "Commemoration SSR: "Independence was much more important than Diego Garcia"". Le Mauricien. 11 March 2019.
- Dukhira, Chit (19 September 2014). "114th Birth Anniversary of Sir Seewoosagur Ramgoolam". Mauritius Times.
- "Dépôt de gerbes au Samadhi de SSR : « Un homme avec un parcours extraordinaire », dit Navin Ramgoolam" [Wreaths laid at SSR's samadhi: "A man with an extraordinary career", says Navin Ramgoolam]. Defimedia (in French). 18 September 2024.
- Favoreu, Louis. "RAMGOOLAM sir SEEWOOSAGUR (1900-1985)". Encyclopædia Universalis (in French).
- "From 'Coolie' to Prime Minister – the Ramgoolam Story". Coolitude. University of Edinburgh.
- "Funérailles : SAJ voisin de SSR au jardin de Pamplemousses" [Funeral: SAJ next to SSR in the Pamplemousses garden]. L'Express (in French). 5 June 2021.
- "Golden Jubilee: In praise of the SSR National Hospital". L'Express. 7 September 2018.
- "Historical Background". Sir Seewoosagur Ramgoolam Memorial Centre for Culture. Mauritius Museums Council. Archived from the original on 22 January 2021.
- "History: Beekrumsing Ramlallah rings the alarm bells over Diego Garcia in 1964". Le Mauricien. 30 November 2023.
- "History: Independence and post-colonial Mauritius (1968–1982)". Le Mauricien. 30 March 2015.
- "Il y a 36 ans : le premier 60-0 de l'histoire" [36 years ago: the first 60–0 in history]. L'Express (in French). 12 June 2018.
- Mallinder, Lorraine (11 February 2025). "'Tug of war': Chagos Islands deal tearing families apart in Mauritius". Al Jazeera English.
- "Internal Conflict in PMSD Pits Dissidents Against Duval". Le Mauricien (in French). 23 June 1981. pp. 1, 4 – via Joint Publications Research Service, Sub-Saharan Africa Report No. 2461 (JPRS 78694), 6 August 1981.
- "Jardin de Pamplemousses : le samadhi de SAJ classé patrimoine national moins de trois mois après son dévoilement" [Pamplemousses garden: SAJ's samadhi listed as national heritage less than three months after its unveiling]. L'Express (in French). 4 September 2022.
- "Le 105e anniversaire de SSR célébré avec faste" [SSR's 105th anniversary celebrated with pomp]. L'Express (in French). 19 September 2005.
- "Le 12 juin 1982 – 40 ans déjà pour le premier 60-0 !" [12 June 1982: 40 years already since the first 60–0]. Le Mauricien (in French). 12 June 2022.
- "Maçons, frères de l'ombre" [Masons, brothers of the shadows]. L'Express (in French). 7 April 2008.
- McQuiston, John T. (17 December 1985). "Sir Seewoosagur Ramgoolam of Mauritius Is Dead at 85". The New York Times. p. B13.
- Moheeputh, Anand (20 February 2014). "The 'shotgun wedding' between Ramgoolam and Rozemont". L'Express.
- Mulloo, Anand (15 September 1998). "Kewal – The Story of Seewoosagur Ramgoolam". Birth Centenary Celebrations of Sir Seewoosagur Ramgoolam. Government of Mauritius. Archived from the original on 9 September 2013.
- Mulloo, Anand (15 September 1998). "The London Days". Birth Centenary Celebrations of Sir Seewoosagur Ramgoolam. Government of Mauritius. Archived from the original on 22 July 2011.
- Mulloo, Anand (15 September 1998). "Dr Ramgoolam's Promises". Birth Centenary Celebrations of Sir Seewoosagur Ramgoolam. Government of Mauritius. Archived from the original on 22 July 2011.
- "Native Village Welcomes Mauritius Prime Minister". Hindu Press International. Reprinted from NDTV, 20 February 2008. 24 February 2008.
- "Navin Ramgoolam : « Lady Sushil zame line met so nene dan politik »" [Navin Ramgoolam: "Lady Sushil never put her nose into politics"]. Defimedia (in French). 2 October 2022.
- "Opposition secures landslide victory in Mauritius election". Al Jazeera. 12 November 2024.
- Peerthum, Satyendra (16 September 2025). "The Life & Legacy of Sir Seewoosagur Ramgoolam (1900-1985)". Le Mauricien.
- Peerthum, Satyendra (17 September 2026). "À l'occasion du 126e anniversaire de la naissance de SSR" [On the 126th anniversary of SSR's birth]. Le Mauricien (in French).
- Poché, Jean Marc (20 September 2026). "Tour d'horizon : Hommage à SSR" [Overview: Tribute to SSR]. Le Mauricien (in French).
- "Ramgoolam Justifies Siding With Francois". Le Mauricien (in French). 24 April 1982. pp. 1, 17 – via Joint Publications Research Service, Sub-Saharan Africa Report No. 2647 (JPRS 81146), 28 June 1982.
- Ramsurrun, Pahlad (21 September 2018). "SSR's Association with Subhas Chandra Bose (I)". Le Mauricien.
- Reddi, Sada (27 August 2021). "Dissent and Political Parties in Mauritius". Mauritius Times.
- Reddi, Sada (24 September 2026). "SSR: Where East Meets West". Mauritius Times.
- "Republican Access of Mauritius – 1992". Le Mauricien. 11 March 2014.
- Roopun, Beekash (12 March 2026). "Ile Maurice: Dépôt de gerbes au Samadhi de SSR et SAJ au jardin botanique de Pamplemousses" [Mauritius: Wreaths laid at the samadhis of SSR and SAJ in the Pamplemousses botanic garden]. L'Express (in French) – via allAfrica.
- "Satcam Boolell immortalisé" [Satcam Boolell immortalised]. L'Express (in French). 12 September 2008.
- Selvon, Sydney (22 February 2017). "The true nature of the retrocession movement in Mauritius prior to the birth of the Mauritius Labour Party". L'Express. Archived from the original on 3 June 2020.
- "Sir Seewoosagur Ramgoolam : L'héritage d'un visionnaire pour Maurice" [Sir Seewoosagur Ramgoolam: a visionary's legacy for Mauritius]. L'Express (in French). 17 September 2025.
- "Sunita Ramgoolam-Joypaul : « Maman doit être fière de Navin et moi »" [Sunita Ramgoolam-Joypaul: "Mum must be proud of Navin and me"]. Defimedia (in French). 28 May 2012. Archived from the original on 15 December 2014.
- Yadav, J. P. (4 April 2008). "Politics here is spelt with a capital 'C'". The Indian Express. Archived from the original on 29 September 2022.
- "Élections partielles : et de dix pour Maurice !" [By-elections: ten for Mauritius]. Defimedia (in French). 24 June 2017.

Political offices
New office	Chief Minister of Mauritius; 1961–1964	Succeeded by Himself as Premier
Preceded by Himself as Chief Minister	Premier of Mauritius; 1964–1967	Succeeded by Himself as Prime Minister
Preceded by Himself as Premier	Prime Minister of Mauritius; 1967–1982	Succeeded by Anerood Jugnauth
Party political offices
Preceded by Guy Rozemont	Leader of the Labour Party; 1958–1983	Succeeded by Satcam Boolell
Diplomatic posts
Preceded by Idi Amin	Chairman of the Organisation of African Unity; 1976–1977	Succeeded by Omar Bongo
Government offices
Preceded by Dayendranath Burrenchobay	Governor-General of Mauritius; 1983–1985	Succeeded by Cassam Moollan as Acting
