= Raman Osman =

Governor-General of Mauritius (1902–1992)

Sir Raman Osman
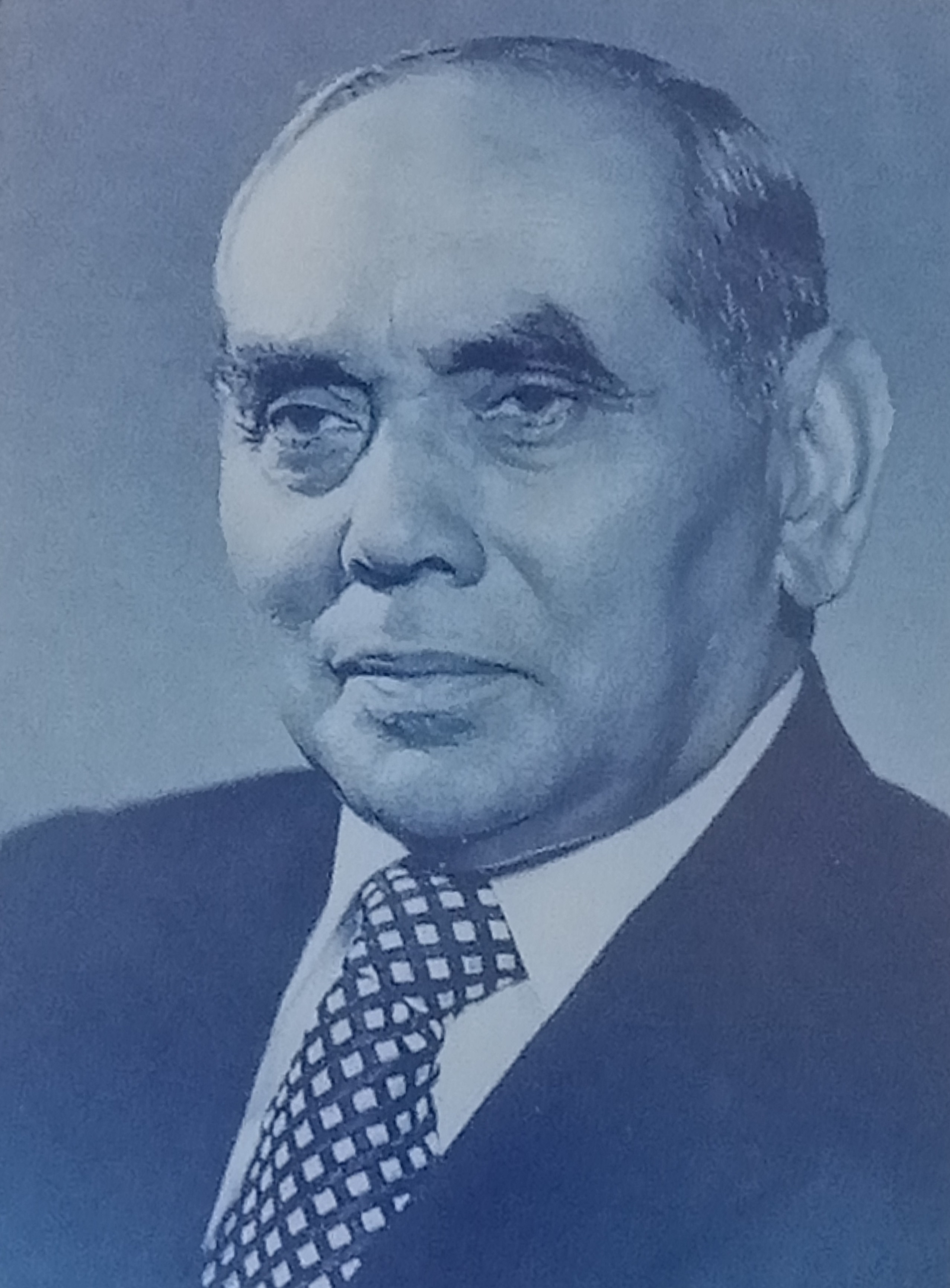

3rd Governor-General of Mauritius
- In office 27 December 1972 – 31 October 1977
- Monarch: Elizabeth II
- Prime Minister: Seewoosagur Ramgoolam
- Preceded by: Leonard Williams
- Succeeded by: Henry Garrioch (acting)

Personal details
- Born: 29 August 1902 Bon Air
- Died: 16 November 1992 (aged 90) Le Goulet, Tombeau Bay

Sir Abdool Raman Mahomed Osman, GCMG, CBE (29 August 1902 – 16 November 1992) was the third governor-general of Mauritius from 27 December 1972 to 31 October 1977. He was knighted in 1973, and was the first non-British Mauritian governor general. The Royal College of Phoenix was renamed Sir Abdool Raman Osman State College, in late 1996.

Government offices
Preceded by Leonard Williams	Governor-General of Mauritius; 1972 – 1977	Succeeded by Henry Garrioch; Acting
