= Fifth Anerood Jugnauth cabinet =

Cabinet of Mauritius from 2000 to 2003

- 10th Cabinet of Mauritius

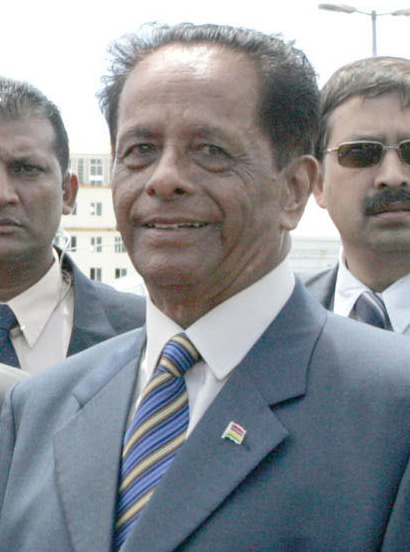
- Date formed: 16 September 2000
- Date dissolved: 30 September 2003

People and organisations
- President: Cassam Uteem; Angidi Chettiar (acting); Ariranga Pillay (acting); Karl Offmann
- Prime Minister: Anerood Jugnauth
- Deputy Prime Minister: Paul Bérenger
- Member party: MSM; MMM; VF; PMSD; MR (until 5 May 2001); OPR
- Status in legislature: Supermajority coalition
- Opposition party: PTr; PMXD; MMSM; MR; MR (from 5 May 2001)
- Opposition leader: Navin Ramgoolam

History
- Election: 2000
- Legislature term: 6th National Assembly
- Predecessor: N. Ramgoolam I
- Successor: Bérenger

The Fifth Anerood Jugnauth cabinet was a former cabinet of Mauritius formed by prime minister Sir Anerood Jugnauth in September 2000 following the victory of his alliance in the 2000 general election.

The MSM/MMM alliance, composed of the Militant Socialist Movement and the Mauritian Militant Movement along with its junior parties of the Parti Mauricien Social Démocrate, Les Verts Fraternels and the Mouvement Républicain, won a decisive victory in the general election and defeated incumbent prime minister Navin Ramgoolam's alliance of Labour Party and the Parti Mauricien Xavier-Luc Duval. The entire government was sworn in on 17 September 2000, allowing Jugnauth to form his fifth government. This was the second time that the two militant parties formed a government together.

Under the MedPoint deal settled before the election, Jugnauth agreed to a rotation government with Paul Bérenger, leader of the MMM, which would see the former serve the first three years of the government and then would eventually resign to become the president of Mauritius, allowing Bérenger to become prime minister and serve the remaining two years. The rotational agreement came into effect when Jugnauth submitted his resignation to the president, Karl Offmann, on 30 September 2003 and Bérenger was sworn in as prime minister along with the rest of his cabinet.

== History ==
=== Formation ===
Following the victory of the MSM/MMM alliance in the general election held in September 2000, Anerood Jugnauth was appointed as prime minister by president Cassam Uteem. As agreed upon under the MedPoint deal, the electoral agreement which became the basis for the power-sharing deal between the two parties, both the allocation of electoral tickets and ministerial positions would be divided equally between the Militant Socialist Movement and the Mauritian Militant Movement. A maximum of 24 ministers can be appointed under the constitution, including the prime minister, giving both the MSM and MMM a total of 12 ministers each. The junior parties of the alliance, namely the Parti Mauricien Social Démocrate, Les Verts Fraternels and the Mouvement Républicain, were allocated positions based on their respective senior parties. The PMSD was under the quota of the MMM whilst the VF and MR were under the MSM's quota.

Paul Bérenger, leader of the MMM, became deputy prime minister and minister of finance , the former which he held only three years previously under Navin Ramgoolam's government and the latter which he held last time under Jugnauth's first government in 1982. Jayen Cuttaree of the MMM became the third in seniority within the government and became industry minister, having held the same ministry under the first alliance in 1991. Pravind Jugnauth, son of the elder Jugnauth, was appointed to his first ministerial position and was made agriculture minister; he became fourth in seniority. The MMM's Sam Lauthan was appointed social security minister and thus fifth in seniority.

Emmanuel Leung Shing of the MSM was appointed as Attorney-General and minister of justice. Sylvio Michel, leader of Les Verts Fraternels, was appointed minister of fisheries and was the only member of any of the junior parties to receive a ministerial position. Michel was previously a minister under Jugnauth's first government in 1982 and broke off from his government in 1984. Ajay Gunness of the MMM became the government chief whip whilst Prithviraj Putten became the deputy speaker of the National Assembly.

=== Withdrawal of Mouvement Republicain ===
Rama Valayden, leader of the Mouvement Républicain, announced on 5 May 2001 that the party was withdrawing from the ruling coalition following a special general assembly of the MR in which Valayden submitted a withdrawal motion and passed unanimously on the same day. Valayden accused the two alliance leaders, Jugnauth and Bérenger, of ignoring the governmental programme for which the ruling alliance was elected. In addition, he cited and deplored the lack of communication between the alliance leaders which had occurred since 15 August of that same year.

The party's only member in the National Assembly and deputy leader of the Mouvement Républicain, Sunil Dowarkasing, was asked to leave the government and join the opposition and challenge the alliance's government policies. If in the case of refusal, the party would remove Dowarkasing from all leadership posts. After returning from a trip, Dowarkasing signalled his intention to remain in the government and subsequently left the party.

The MR would join the opposition and eventually join the Alliance Sociale of Navin Ramgoolam. Dowarkasing would also integrate with the MSM later on. This would be the first instance during the MSM/MMM government that one of the alliance parties left the government.

=== Controversy on the Prevention of Terrorism Act ===
Following the September 11 attacks in the United States, the US government had urged the Mauritian government to pass legislation that aimed to combat terrorism. The proposed bill, called the Prevention of Terrorism Act (POTA), was introduced to the National Assembly and contained provisions which gave power to police officers to arrest individuals without a warrant under the criterion of suspicion. It also gave the Commissioner of Police to determine unilaterally whether an organisation suspected of terrorist motives or activities to be banned.

The latter provision, which proved to be controversial, became a point of consternation between the assembly and the president, Cassam Uteem. Uteem declared that he had reservations with certain clauses of the bill, particularly infringing upon freedom. Under the constitution, the president has the power to withhold his assent to bills with a request that the assembly should reconsider the bill, along with any proposed amendments that the president may have. Having exercised his power, Uteem submitted the bill back for reconsideration along with 10 amendments, including an amendment that the interior minister should consult the president before declaring any person a terrorist. However, the government did not approve any of the proposed amendments and passed the legislation once again on 4 February 2002 without amendments.

Subsequently, under the constitution, Uteem was legally obliged to assent to the bill regardless of whether it was modified or unmodified during its resubmission to the assembly. Having no choice and refusing to give his assent once again, Uteem submitted his resignation to the speaker of the National Assembly as president on 15 February 2002. He then left Mauritius and subsequently left for Saudi Arabia to do Hajj.

Vice-president Angidi Chettiar became acting president following Uteem's resignation. However, his term would be cut short on 18 February 2002 when he himself also resigned from the vice-presidency, and consequently as acting president, after having announced his refusal to grant assent to the bill. Chettiar stated that he preferred to resign rather than grant assent. In addition, as a member of the Labour Party, party leader Navin Ramgoolam had requested Chettiar to refuse his assent to POTA.

Chief Justice Ariranga Pillay succeeded Chettiar as acting president and remained in that capacity until 25 February. Pillay eventually granted assent to the bill and became law.

=== Presidential succession and rotational agreement ===
After the resignation of both Uteem and Chettiar as president and vice-president respectively, a vacancy to the two highest positions in the country occurred and the government had to propose new candidates to fill the vacancies. The MSM had the right of nomination for the presidency whilst the MMM had the right for the vice-presidency.

Karl Offmann, who had previously served as a MSM minister under Jugnauth's previous governments, was nominated for the presidency. On the other hand, complications for the MMM's candidate for the vice-presidency arose. Paul Bérenger had nominated Swaley Kasenally for the post. Kasenally was also a former minister and had been a member of the MMM until the split of the party in 1994 in which he joined other dissenters to form the Mauritian Militant Renewal. Jugnauth raised no objections to the nomination whilst the politburo of the MMM was opposed to the nomination due to the fact that Kasenally had been a dissenter of the party. Bérenger then proposed Ahmad Jeewah, who was also a minister in the government and president of the MMM, for the vice-presidency but the risk of losing to the opposition in a by-election prevented his name from going forward. Instead, Raouf Bundhun, ambassador of Mauritius to France, was proposed by Jayen Cuttaree and subsequently Bundhun agreed to the nomination after a call by Bérenger. Offmann and Bundhun were unanimously elected to their positions on 25 February and 8 March by the National Assembly respectively.

Under the terms of the MedPoint deal agreed by the two main parties of the alliance, a rotation government would take place after three years to which Jugnauth would give way to Bérenger and become prime minister. Jugnauth would then subsequently assume the presidency and retire from politics. Because of the deal, Offmann would resign as president to give way to Jugnauth and would serve the presidency for a year and 7 months.

Pravind Jugnauth, Anerood's son, would also take over the leadership and helm of the Militant Socialist Movement at the same time. He would become deputy prime minister and second in seniority within the government following the rotation.

On 30 September 2003, the elder Jugnauth delivered his final speech to the National Assembly and afterwards, went to see president Karl Offmann and tendered his resignation as prime minister. Thereafter, Bérenger was sworn in as prime minister along with the rest of the cabinet since the constitution states that the resignation of a prime minister constitutes the resignation of the entire government.

This was the first time in Mauritian history that such a deal was agreed upon and materialised. The governmental alliance would remain in office until the expiration of its mandate and loss in the 2005 general election. This would also be the first successful government in which both the MSM and the MMM governed for the entirety of a term as the first alliance in 1990 and subsequent reelection in 1991 resulted in a bitter breakdown of the alliance in 1993.

== Supporting parties ==
Name		Leader	Ministers	Private Secretaries
Government parties
MSM	Militant Socialist Movement; Mouvement Socialiste Militant	Anerood Jugnauth	12 / 25	4 / 9
MMM	Mauritian Militant Movement; Mouvement Militant Mauricien	Paul Bérenger	12 / 25	5 / 9
VF	Les Verts Fraternels	Sylvio Michel	1 / 25	0 / 9
PMSD	Parti Mauricien Social Démocrate	Maurice Allet	0 / 25	0 / 9
MR	Republican Movement; Mouvement Républicain	Rama Valayden	0 / 25	0 / 9
OPR	Rodrigues People's Organisation; Organisation du Peuple Rodriguais	Serge Clair	Unrepresented	

== Ministers ==
A total of 25 ministers were appointed, including the Attorney-General. The division of the number of ministers were equal between the two main parties of the alliance. The MSM and MMM both received 12 ministers, with the MSM also holding the office of Attorney-General. Les Verts Fraternels, counted under the quota of the MSM, received a ministerial post; the only one of all the junior parties of the alliance to do so.

During the entire term of the cabinet, only one minister was dismissed or resigned. Mookhesswur Choonee was arrested and charged by the Independent Commission Against Corruption (ICAC) after being found of accepting bribes totalling to Rs. 4.5 million in relation to the sale of state land. Choonee submitted his resignation on 24 January 2003 and was replaced by Joe Lesjongard as housing and lands minister.

A minor reshuffle and modification of ministerial responsibilities were conducted twice, with the following ministries changing their appellations to the following:

- 2002
  - Industry, Commerce and International Trade → Industry and International Trade
  - Local Government, Rodrigues and Urban and Rural Development → Local Government and Rodrigues
  - Public Infrastructure and Inland Transport → Public Infrastructure, Land Transport and Shipping
  - Cooperatives and Handicraft → Commerce and Cooperatives
- 24 January 2003
  - Tourism → Tourism and Leisure
  - Training, Skills Development and Productivity → Training, Skills Development, Employment and Productivity

Party key	Militant Socialist Movement
Party key	Mauritian Militant Movement
Party key	Les Verts Fraternels

Portfolio	Portrait	Minister	Term
Prime Minister
Prime Minister		Sir Anerood Jugnauth	16 September 2000 – 30 September 2003
Deputy Prime Minister
Deputy Prime Minister		Paul Bérenger	17 September 2000 – 30 September 2003
Ministers
Minister of Defence and Home Affairs		Sir Anerood Jugnauth	17 September 2000 – 30 September 2003
Minister of External Communications		Sir Anerood Jugnauth	17 September 2000 – 30 September 2003
Minister of Finance		Paul Bérenger	17 September 2000 – 30 September 2003
Minister of Industry, Commerce and International Trade later Industry and International Trade		Jayen Cuttaree	17 September 2000 – 30 September 2003
Minister of Agriculture, Food Technology and Natural Resources		Pravind Jugnauth	17 September 2000 – 30 September 2003
Minister of Social Security, National Solidarity and Senior Citizen Welfare and Reform Institutions		Sam Lauthan	17 September 2000 – 30 September 2003
Minister of Local Government, Rodrigues and Urban and Rural Development later Local Government and Rodrigues		Joe Lesjongard	17 September 2000 – 30 September 2003
Minister of Public Utilities		Alan Ganoo	17 September 2000 – 30 September 2003
Minister of Tourism later Tourism and Leisure		Nando Bodha	17 September 2000 – 30 September 2003
Minister of Environment		Rajesh Bhagwan	17 September 2000 – 30 September 2003
Minister of Public Infrastructure and Inland Transport later Public Infrastructure, Land Transport and Shipping		Anil Bachoo	17 September 2000 – 30 September 2003
Minister of Civil Service Affairs and Administrative Reforms		Ahmad Jeewah	17 September 2000 – 30 September 2003
Minister of Labour and Industrial Relations		Showkutally Soodhun	17 September 2000 – 30 September 2003
Minister of Women's Rights, Child Development and Family Welfare		Arianne Navarre-Marie	17 September 2000 – 30 September 2003
Minister of Foreign Affairs and Regional Cooperation		Anil Gayan	17 September 2000 – 30 September 2003
Minister of Education and Scientific Research		Steven Obeegadoo	17 September 2000 – 30 September 2003
Minister of Health and Quality of Life		Ashok Jugnauth	17 September 2000 – 30 September 2003
Minister of Arts and Culture		Motee Ramdass	17 September 2000 – 30 September 2003
Minister of Fisheries		Sylvio Michel	17 September 2000 – 30 September 2003
Minister of Economic Development, Financial Services and Corporate Affairs		Sushil Khushiram	17 September 2000 – 30 September 2003
Minister of Cooperatives and Handicraft later Commerce and Cooperatives		Prem Koonjoo	17 September 2000 – 30 September 2003
Minister of Housing and Lands		Mookhesswur Choonee	17 September 2000 – 24 January 2003
Minister of Housing and Lands		Joe Lesjongard	24 January 2003 – 30 September 2003
Minister of Information Technology and Telecommunications		Pradeep Jeeha	17 September 2000 – 30 September 2003
Attorney-General		Emmanuel Leung Shing	17 September 2000 – 30 September 2003
Minister of Justice and Human Rights		Emmanuel Leung Shing	17 September 2000 – 30 September 2003
Minister of Training, Skills Development and Productivity later Training, Skills Development, Employment and Productivity		Sangeet Fowdar	17 September 2000 – 30 September 2003
Minister of Youth and Sports		Ravi Yerrigadoo	17 September 2000 – 30 September 2003
