= 2005 Mauritian general election =

- 3 July 2005

All 62 directly elected seats in the National Assembly (and up to 8 BLS seats)
- Turnout: 81.52% (▲0.65 pp)
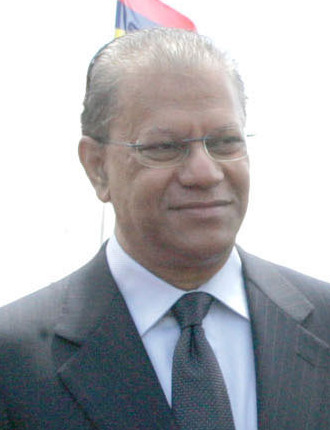

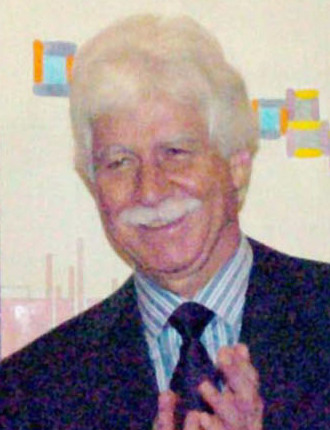
| | First party | Second party |
|---|---|---|
| Leader | Navin Ramgoolam | Paul Bérenger |
| Party | Labour | MMM |
| Alliance | Alliance Sociale | MSM/MMM |
| Alliance seats | 42 | 24 |
| Popular vote | 948,756 | 831,738 |
| Alliance % | 48.38% | 42.41% |
- Result by constituency. The colour shade shows the percentage of the elected candidate with the highest number of votes
Prime Minister before election
Paul Bérenger
MMM
Subsequent Prime Minister
Navin Ramgoolam
Labour

General elections were held in Mauritius on 3 July 2005, with votes counted on 4 July.

The Alliance Sociale, a coalition led by the Mauritian Labour Party (PTr) and including the Mauritian Party of Xavier-Luc Duval (PMXD), the Mauritian Social Democrat Party (MSN), Les Verts (Greens), the Republican Movement, and the Mauritian Militant Socialist Movement (MMSM), won the election with 42 of the 70 seats (38 elected directly, and another 4 nominated under the country's "best loser" system). The PTr leader, Navin Ramgoolam, was subsequently appointed Prime Minister on 5 July, with Rashid Beebeejaun as his deputy. Three other coalition leaders were elected, but the Les Verts leader failed to oust outgoing Prime Minister Paul Bérenger from his constituency.

24 seats were won by Bérenger's coalition, consisting of the Mauritian Militant Movement (MMM) and the Militant Socialist Movement (MSM); of these, 22 were directly elected and two were nominated as "best losers". Pravind Jugnauth, the MSM leader, lost his seat to an Alliance Sociale candidate.

The two seats reserved for the island of Rodrigues were won by the Rodrigues Movement (OPR); another 2 OPR members were appointed as "best losers."

== Electoral system ==
The National Assembly consisted of 60 members elected from three-seat constituencies in mainland Mauritius by multiple non-transferable vote, two members elected from a two-seat constituency (the island of Rodrigues) by the same system, and up to eight "best loser" seats appointed to ensure that ethnic and religious minorities are equitably represented.

== Results ==
The total number of votes is higher than the population because voters could cast up to three votes.

| Party | Votes | % | Seats | | |
| Party | Votes | % | Cons | BL | Total |
|---|---|---|---|---|---|
| Alliance Sociale (PTR–PMXD–LVF–MR–MMSM) | 948,756 | 48.38 | 38 | 4 | 42 |
| MSM/MMM (MMM–MSM–PMSD) | 831,738 | 42.41 | 22 | 2 | 24 |
| Mauritian Solidarity Front | 37,472 | 1.91 | 0 | 0 | 0 |
| Rodrigues People's Organisation | 20,293 | 1.03 | 2 | 0 | 2 |
| Rodrigues Movement | 19,547 | 1.00 | 0 | 2 | 2 |
| National Democratic Movement Raj Dayal | 18,467 | 0.94 | 0 | 0 | 0 |
| Lalit | 13,726 | 0.70 | 0 | 0 | 0 |
| Mauritian People's Party | 7,919 | 0.40 | 0 | 0 | 0 |
| Muslim People's Front | 4,218 | 0.22 | 0 | 0 | 0 |
| Rezistans ek Alternativ | 2,964 | 0.15 | 0 | 0 | 0 |
| Alliance For Justice | 2,548 | 0.13 | 0 | 0 | 0 |
| Tamil Council | 1,980 | 0.10 | 0 | 0 | 0 |
| Group of Five | 1,547 | 0.08 | 0 | 0 | 0 |
| Independent Socialist Movement | 1,337 | 0.07 | 0 | 0 | 0 |
| Independent Forward Bloc | 1,217 | 0.06 | 0 | 0 | 0 |
| Mauritian Union | 1,066 | 0.05 | 0 | 0 | 0 |
| Rally of Social Workers | 1,059 | 0.05 | 0 | 0 | 0 |
| Parti Malin | 959 | 0.05 | 0 | 0 | 0 |
| Majority Party | 875 | 0.04 | 0 | 0 | 0 |
| Popular Place Movement | 733 | 0.04 | 0 | 0 | 0 |
| Union Patriots Ilois Mauricien | 643 | 0.03 | 0 | 0 | 0 |
| Mauritian National Movement | 580 | 0.03 | 0 | 0 | 0 |
| Mauritian Democratic Movement | 572 | 0.03 | 0 | 0 | 0 |
| Mauritian Workers' Movement | 472 | 0.02 | 0 | 0 | 0 |
| Conservative Party | 426 | 0.02 | 0 | 0 | 0 |
| Democratie Union Socialist Mauricien | 267 | 0.01 | 0 | 0 | 0 |
| Ekta Party | 171 | 0.01 | 0 | 0 | 0 |
| Mauritian Muslim Action Committee | 158 | 0.01 | 0 | 0 | 0 |
| Mauritian Democracy | 135 | 0.01 | 0 | 0 | 0 |
| Mauritian Socialist Rally | 133 | 0.01 | 0 | 0 | 0 |
| Patriotic Reformist Organisation | 132 | 0.01 | 0 | 0 | 0 |
| Mauritian Worker Solidarity Movement Rodrigues Agalega | 125 | 0.01 | 0 | 0 | 0 |
| Rallying Responsible Rodriguans | 97 | 0.00 | 0 | 0 | 0 |
| Top Dhamaka Vrai Rouge | 88 | 0.00 | 0 | 0 | 0 |
| Rodriguan People's Progressive Front | 87 | 0.00 | 0 | 0 | 0 |
| Socialist Labour Movement | 71 | 0.00 | 0 | 0 | 0 |
| Mauritius Party Rights | 51 | 0.00 | 0 | 0 | 0 |
| Independents | 38,487 | 1.96 | 0 | 0 | 0 |
| Total | 1,961,116 | 100.00 | 62 | 8 | 70 |
| Valid votes | 660,376 | 99.11 | | | |
| Invalid/blank votes | 5,922 | 0.89 | | | |
| Total votes | 666,298 | 100.00 | | | |
| Registered voters/turnout | 817,305 | 81.52 | | | |
Source: Electoral Commission, African Elections Database

=== By constituency ===
| Constituency | | MP | Party | Notes |
|---|---|---|---|---|
| 1 | Grand River North West– Port Louis West | Arianne Navarre-Marie | MMM | Reelected |
| 1 | Grand River North West– Port Louis West | Jean Claude Barbier | MMM | Reelected |
| 1 | Grand River North West– Port Louis West | Sheila Grenade | MSM | Elected |
| 1 | Grand River North West– Port Louis West | James Burty David | PTr | Best Loser; Reelected |
| 2 | Port Louis South– Port Louis Central | Rashid Beebeejaun | PTr | Reelected |
| 2 | Port Louis South– Port Louis Central | Reza Issack | PTr | Elected |
| 2 | Port Louis South– Port Louis Central | Sylvio Tang | PTr | Elected |
| 3 | Port Louis Maritime– Port Louis East | Asraf Dulull | PTr | Elected |
| 3 | Port Louis Maritime– Port Louis East | Anwar Husnoo | PTr | Elected |
| 3 | Port Louis Maritime– Port Louis East | Sam Lauthan | MMM | Reelected |
| 4 | Port Louis North– Montagne Longue | Kalyanee Juggoo | PTr | Elected |
| 4 | Port Louis North– Montagne Longue | Joe Lesjongard | MSM | Reelected |
| 4 | Port Louis North– Montagne Longue | Mahen Jhugroo | MSM | Elected |
| 5 | Pamplemousses–Triolet | Navin Ramgoolam | PTr | Reelected |
| 5 | Pamplemousses–Triolet | Satish Faugoo | PTr | Elected |
| 5 | Pamplemousses–Triolet | Devanand Ritoo | PTr | Elected |
| 6 | Grand Baie–Poudre D'Or | Madan Dulloo | MMSM | Reelected |
| 6 | Grand Baie–Poudre D'Or | Anand Rucktooa | MSD | Elected |
| 6 | Grand Baie–Poudre D'Or | Rohit Guttee | PTr | Elected |
| 7 | Piton–Riviere du Rempart | Balkissoon Hookoom | PTr | Reelected |
| 7 | Piton–Riviere du Rempart | Dhanraj Boodhoo | PTr | Elected |
| 7 | Piton–Riviere du Rempart | Mahendra Gowressoo | PTr | Elected |
| 8 | Quartier Militaire–Moka | Ashok Jugnauth | MSM | Reelected |
| 8 | Quartier Militaire–Moka | Suren Dayal | PTr | Elected |
| 8 | Quartier Militaire–Moka | Parmessur Ramloll | MSD | Elected |
| 9 | Flacq–Bon Accueil | Anil Bachoo | MSD | Elected |
| 9 | Flacq–Bon Accueil | Rajen Mungur | PTr | Elected |
| 9 | Flacq–Bon Accueil | Dharam Gokhool | PTr | Elected |
| 10 | Montagne Blanche– Grand River South East | Indira Seebun | PTr | Elected |
| 10 | Montagne Blanche– Grand River South East | Lormus Bundhoo | PTr | Elected |
| 10 | Montagne Blanche– Grand River South East | Ajay Gunness | MMM | Reelected |
| 10 | Montagne Blanche– Grand River South East | Cader Sayed-Hossen | PTr | Best Loser |
| 11 | Vieux Grand Port–Rose Belle | Arvin Boolell | PTr | Reelected |
| 11 | Vieux Grand Port–Rose Belle | Rajesh Jeetah | PTr | Elected |
| 11 | Vieux Grand Port–Rose Belle | Sutyadeo Moutia | MMSM | Elected |
| 12 | Mahebourg–Plaine Magnien | Yatin Varma | PTr | Elected |
| 12 | Mahebourg–Plaine Magnien | Richard Duval | PMXD | Elected |
| 12 | Mahebourg–Plaine Magnien | Vasant Bunwaree | PTr | Elected |
| 13 | Riviere des Anguilles–Souillac | Pradeep Peetumber | PTr | Elected |
| 13 | Riviere des Anguilles–Souillac | Ram Mardemootoo | PTr | Elected |
| 13 | Riviere des Anguilles–Souillac | Shakeel Mohamed | PTr | Elected |
| 14 | Savanne–Black River | Alan Ganoo | MMM | Reelected |
| 14 | Savanne–Black River | Maya Hanoomanjee | MSM | Elected |
| 14 | Savanne–Black River | Krishna Babajee | PTr | Elected |
| 14 | Savanne–Black River | Danielle Perrier | MMM | Best Loser; Reelected |
| 15 | La Cavèrne–Phoenix | Abu Kasenally | PTr | Elected |
| 15 | La Cavèrne–Phoenix | Rihun Hawoldar | PTr | Elected |
| 15 | La Cavèrne–Phoenix | Leela Dookun-Luchoomun | MSM | Reelected |
| 15 | La Cavèrne–Phoenix | Jean François Chaumière | PTr | Best Loser |
| 15 | La Cavèrne–Phoenix | Showkutally Soodhun | MSM | Best Loser; Reelected |
| 16 | Vacoas–Floréal | Nando Bodha | MSM | Reelected |
| 16 | Vacoas–Floréal | Sheila Bappoo | PTr | Elected |
| 16 | Vacoas–Floréal | Françoise Labelle | MMM | Reelected |
| 16 | Vacoas–Floréal | Étienne Sinatambou | PTr | Best Loser |
| 17 | Curepipe–Midlands | Éric Guimbeau | MMM | Reelected |
| 17 | Curepipe–Midlands | Mireille Martin | MSM | Elected |
| 17 | Curepipe–Midlands | Sunil Dowarkasing | MSM | Reelected |
| 18 | Belle Rose–Quatre Bornes | Rama Sithanen | PTr | Elected |
| 18 | Belle Rose–Quatre Bornes | Xavier-Luc Duval | PMXD | Reelected |
| 18 | Belle Rose–Quatre Bornes | Nita Deerpalsing | PTr | Elected |
| 19 | Stanley–Rose Hill | Paul Bérenger | MMM | Reelected |
| 19 | Stanley–Rose Hill | Jayen Cuttaree | MMM | Reelected |
| 19 | Stanley–Rose Hill | Fazila Daureeawoo | MSM | Elected |
| 20 | Beau Bassin–Petite Rivière | Rajesh Bhagwan | MMM | Reelected |
| 20 | Beau Bassin–Petite Rivière | Maurice Allet | PMSD | Reelected |
| 20 | Beau Bassin–Petite Rivière | Sekar Naidu | MSM | Elected |
| 21 | Rodrigues | Alex Nancy | OPR | Reelected |
| 21 | Rodrigues | Robert Speville | OPR | Elected |
| 21 | Rodrigues | Christian Leopold | MR | Best Loser; Reelected |
| 21 | Rodrigues | Nicolas Von Mally | MR | Best Loser; Reelected |
Source: Electoral Commission
