= Yatindra Nath Varma =

Mauritian politician (born 1974)

Yatin Varma

Member of National Assembly Constituency No.12
- In office July 2005 – April 2010
- Prime Minister: Navin Ramgoolam

Attorney General
- In office June 2010 – May 2013 (resigned)
- Prime Minister: Navin Ramgoolam

Personal details
- Born: 19 December 1974 (age 51) Quatre Bornes, Mauritius
- Party: Labour Party (Mauritius)
- Education: University of Wolverhampton

Yatindra Nath Varma (born 19 December 1974), most commonly known as Yatin Varma, is a Mauritian politician.

== Early life and education ==
Yatin Varma's father was Moonindra Nathoo Varma (1930–2018), a historian, civil servant and member of the Arya Samaj. His mother, born Ramdin, was a teacher at secondary school Hindu Girls College. He grew up in a family of 4 children.

Varma started his secondary school education at Royal College Curepipe, but then left to attend the Mahatma Gandhi Institute (MGI). He later graduated from the University of Wolverhampton in 1998 with a bachelor of laws degree. He was admitted to the Mauritian Bar in 2001.

== Political career ==
In 1999 he joined the Labour Party and, along with Vasant Bunwaree and Marie Violet Moothia, he was a candidate of the PTr-PMXD coalition at the September 2000 General Elections in Constituency No. 12 (Mahebourg/Plaine Magnien). But they were all defeated by the candidates of the Alliance MSM-MMM, namely Anil Gayan, Soudesh Roopun and Ivan Collendavelloo.

Five years later Varma was elected in Constituency No. 12 (Mahebourg/Plaine Magnien) in the July 2005 Mauritian general election as a candidate of Alliance Sociale, a coalition of 5 parties, namely Mauritian Labour Party, Mauritian Party of Xavier-Luc Duval, The Greens, Republican Movement and the Mauritian Militant Socialist Movement also referred to as PTR–PMXD–VF–MR–MMSM. In Constituency No.12 all 3 seats were won by Alliance Sociale candidates (Varma, Richard Duval and Vasant Bunwaree), defeating their main rivals of the MSM-MMM coalitions (Soudesh Roopun, Eddy Boissézon and Anil Gayan). Although Varma secured the highest number of votes, he missed out on a ministerial post where as Vasant Bunwaree was appointed Minister of Labour, igniting a bitter rivalry between these two politicians. Navin Ramgoolam rewarded Varma for his support during the 2005 elections by appointing him as president of the parliamentary committee of the ICAC, but Varma was forced to resign from this post as ICAC investigated him for influence peddling as Varma actively sought extra remuneration as legal counsel to numerous parastatal bodies, despite already being remunerated as a parliamentarian and lecgal counsel for SLWF, MFDC, ICTA, CEB, Municipality of Quatre Bornes and Municipality of Vacoas Phoenix.

At the May 2010 General Elections, Navin Ramgoolam did not grant Varma any "ticket" or investiture as candidate of the Labour Party as he contended to be campaign manager at Constituency No.5 (Pamplemousses-Triolet). After the victory of the PTr–PMSD–MSM coalition, Ramgoolam rewarded Varma by nominating him as Attorney General and Minister of Justice in 2010. After less than 3 years in office as Attorney General, Yatin Varma was forced to resign by Navin Ramgoolam when the Varmagate road rage scandal broke out in mid 2013. Following a road accident near his residence, Varma and his father assaulted Florent Jeannot a young driver, failed to immediately report the accident to police, tried to bribe his way out, and was charged with conspiracy to pervert the course of justice.

In the aftermath of the 2013-2014 Varmagate scandal Yatin Varma did not secure the investiture of any political party during the 2014 General Elections.

Despite his repeated presence within Constituency No.13 (Rivière-des-Anguilles/Souillac) before the November 2019 General Elections, Varma again missed out on Labour Party's support, as Ramgoolam instead gave investiture to Rubina Daureeawoo, Lormus Bundhoo and Tassarajen Pillay Chedumbrum. Varma also tried to secure a Labour Party "ticket" in Constituency No. 7 Piton Rivière du Rempart but he again missed out, this time to Satish Faugoo. After the defeat of the Labour Party at these elections, Varma publicly criticised Navin Ramgoolam by penning a newspaper article in L'Express to detail Ramgoolam's poor leadership and bad financial mismanagement of Labour Party's funds. With Rama Valayden's support, he asked for Ramgoolam to step down in order to prevent further collapse of the Labour Party. Instead of stepping down Ramgoolam sought the support of the party's executive committee in January 2020 to enforce party discipline by sacking Yatin Varma and 4 other unruly members from the organisation. As a result, Krishna Molaye, Yatin Varma, Balkissoon Hookoom, Raj Pentiah and Prateebah Bholah were expelled from the Labour Party. Ramgoolam also added that Varma's expulsion was a "good riddance" as Varma had also publicly belittled Labour Party candidate Satish Faugoo by referring to the latter as a low caste Hindu.

In preparation for the November 2024 elections, Varma unsuccessfully sought an investiture as a candidate of the MSM. This followed Prime Minister Pravind Jugnauth's observation that many members of the opposition worked as lawyers who defend drug traffickers. Drug trafficker Jean Hubert Celerine (Franklin) had indeed been represented by Varma and Alexandre Leblanc. The latter managed to secure his party's investiture as a candidate of the PMSD. Varma then returned to the Labour Party to assist its candidates, namely in Constituency No.18.

== 2009 altercations with Vasant Bunwaree regarding tax evasion and parastatal bodies' legal counsel ==
On 1 December 2009 during the parliamentary tea-break, Varma nearly had a physical altercation with minister Vasant Bunwaree. Sports minister Sylvio Tang and others intervened on time to prevent an escalation. At the origin of the dispute was a well known case of tax evasion by Yatin Varma, which Vasant Bunwaree alluded to during his response to Varma when he was questioned about the remuneration received by Deepak Tulsidas, a past president of the Human Resource Development Council (HRDC). Vasant Bunwaree responded to Varma: «His fee is Rs 15 000 but he draws only Rs 12 500 after tax deduction. We know it is very important for us to pay taxes, if not, we may be chased by the Mauritius Revenue Authority. I hope the Honourable Member knows what I am saying». Bunwaree also revealed that Yatin Varma had been receiving lucrative additional income as the legal counsel of several parastatal institutions whilst already being paid as a member of the National Assembly, and that Varma regularly issued a letter to elected ministers which read «I would be grateful if you could kindly consider appointing me as legal advisor on a monthly basis to one of your institutions falling under your responsibility». Minister Bunwaree stated that unlike Varma, Deepak Tulsidas had never door-knocked ministers to seek favours.

== 2009 ICAC investigation on Influence Peddling ==
Soon after Bunwaree's revelations, Paul Bérenger, who was Opposition Leader at the time, circulated a copy of Yatin Varma's letter addressed to the Medical Council in which he solicits his own engagement as Legal Counsel. This led to further revelations that Varma had already been receiving money for simultaneously acting as legal counsel for the SILWF, MFDC, ICTA, CEB, Municipality of Quatre Bornes, and Municipality of Vacoas-Phoenix. In 2007 Anil Gayan wrote a letter to the ICAC to complain that Yatin Varma was using his office for gratification. As the ICAC started to investigate Varma for influence peddling, he had to step down from his post as president of the parliamentary committee of the ICAC.

== 2013 Varmagate scandal and police arrest ==
In May 2013, when Yatin Varma held the office of Attorney General, he was driving his BMW car (registration AG1123) along Des Rosiers Avenue, with his 84-year-old father Moonindra Nathoo Varma and two children on board, when it collided with another car driven by 19 year old Flic-en-Flac resident Florent Jeannot at the junction of Trianon 2 Avenue in Quatre Bornes. At least 6 eyewitnesses, including the son of a retired high-ranking police officer, came forward to support victim Jeannot's version of events but Varma denied his involvement. The witnesses reported that Yatin Varma got out of his car with his father Moonindra Varma and they both assaulted Florent Jeannot. Yatin Varma's wrist then had to be treated with an orthopedic cast at the Victoria Hospital of Candos due to a fracture of neck of metacarpal, which Dr Gujjalu (former Police Medical Officer) observed, would typically be sustained after administering a punch. Residents from houses near the crime scene attended to the wounded Jeannot. Labour Party thugs harassed the main witness, Ravi Seenundun, at his residence. Bala Kamatchi, retired police superintendent and former lead of Major Crime Investigation Team (MCIT) got involved in Varma's early attempts to settle matters with the Jeannot family, but Maurice Allet (then president of the Mauritius Ports Authority (MPA) and of the PMSD) advised against Kamatchi's further involvement as Kamatchi wanted his own share of compensation for facilitating a settlement. In further attempts to broker a deal, Allet met with Florent's father Mario Jeannot at the MPA, Mauritius Turf Club (MTC), and Montmartre church in Rose Hill. Allet proposed a sum of between Rs 1.5 to 1.7 Million rupees for Jeannot to withdraw his lawsuit and thus settle matters. Businessman and Labour supporter Raj Ramrachia would be supplying the funds. When these attempts failed, Labour private parliamentary secretary (PPS) Reza Issack started to be involved and organised a meeting at Jeannot's home in Flic-en-Flac where Yatin Varma offered champagne and a book to Florent's mother. Reza Issack's further attempts to settle the matter failed as Jeannot refused to withdraw his police statement. Following Alan Ganoo's query in Parliament, Yatin Varma and PPS Reza Issack resigned. On 18 June 2013 Yatin Varma was hospitalised at Fortis Darné clinic for a few days after he attempted to commit suicide by drinking a bottle of herbicide. He had his stomach pumped to clear out the poison and was then admitted to Bon Pasteur clinic before returning home. Both Labour PPS Reza Issack and Yatin Varma were also arrested.

== 2018 medical negligence ==
Two months after Moonindra Varma's death in January 2018, Yatin Varma went to the Central Criminal Investigation Department (CCID) to lodge complaints of "medical negligence" against two doctors and the Ministry of Health. Yatin alleged that an echocardiogram performed on his father in December 2017 failed to detect two blocked arteries, and that chest pains felt in January 2018 were played down as a gastric issue.

== 2019 and 2023 revelations about Labour Party inner workings ==
After the landslide defeat of the Labour Party at two consecutive elections (2014 and 2019), Varma publicly raised his concerns about the failings of its embattled leader Navin Ramgoolam whose arrogance and lack of foresight are destroying the party's prospects. Varma revealed that by 2010 the MSM rescued the seriously disorganized Labour Party via a new coalition, and that by 2014 it was the MMM which rescued it from oblivion. From 2014 to 2019 due to Navin Ramgoolam's poor leadership there was no annual party conference. Varma also deplored Navin Ramgoolam's financial mismanagement of the party's funds as political donations received at the 1991, 1995, 2000, 2005, 2010, 2014 and 2019 general elections cannot be accounted for. Varma observed that as Labour Party's headquarters laid in ruins at Guy Rozemont Square in Port Louis outside Line Barracks, Ramgoolam was caught with Rs 220 million in cash stashed in a safe at his house. The Young Labour wing, consisting of members aged between 15 and 35, was ironically being headed by pensioner Rajesh Jeetah who is more than 60 years old, after the resignation of Nita Deerpalsing. Varma also wrote about the jobless sycophants surrounding Navin Ramgoolam after the 2014 electoral defeat, and who have hijacked the party's controls from its original headquarters to Le Bout du Monde, an exclusive suburb of Ébène. Another revelation made by Varma was that Navin Ramgoolam denied him a "ticket" for his investiture under the Labour Party just before the 2019 elections simply because Varma had complained about Ramgoolam's poor leadership and had suggested structural reforms within the party. At the start of 2023 Varma stated that although he had been reintegrated within the Comité Central of the Labour Party, he felt that the party was in a worse state than when he was expelled from it in 2020.

== See also ==
1. Corruption in Mauritius
