= Ministry of Health and Wellness (Mauritius) =

Government ministry of Mauritius

- Ministère de la Santé et du Bien-être

Agency overview
- Formed: 1963
- Jurisdiction: Government of Mauritius
- Headquarters: Nexsky Building, Ebene
- Ministers responsible: Anil Bachoo, Minister of Health and Wellness; Anishta Babooram, Junior Minister
- Agency executive: P. Mawah, Acting Chief Executive
- Website: health.govmu.org

The Ministry of Health and Wellness (French: Ministère de la Santé et du Bien-être) is a ministry in the government of Mauritius responsible for health.

Anil Bachoo of the Labour Party is the current minister responsible since November 2024, serving under prime minister Navin Ramgoolam's fourth government. Anishta Babooram serves as the junior minister since August 2025.

== History ==
Following the departure of the Mauritian Militant Movement from Navin Ramgoolam's government, Kishore Deerpalsing was appointed after a reshuffle occurred in July 1997. The ministry was subsequently renamed to the ministry of Health and Quality of Life, with the portfolio of Quality and Life being transferred from the ministry of Environment. Ashok Jugnauth would succeed Deerpalsing as minister and would continue to serve in that capacity under the rotation government of Anerood Jugnauth and Paul Bérenger until 2005.

Under Navin Ramgoolam's second government, Satish Faugoo was appointed as minister until a reshuffle in September 2008, with Rajesh Jeetah succeeding him on the post. After the victory of Ramgoolam's alliance in the general election held in 2010, Maya Hanoomanjee of the MSM was appointed as minister. She would go on to serve a troublesome period as minister due to accusations of corruption towards a contract for a clinic linked to Pravind Jugnauth, leader of the MSM. The public outcry of the MedPoint deal led to the resignation and departure of the MSM from the government in July 2011. Lormus Bundhoo would succeed Hanoomanjee as minister and served in that capcity until 2014.

After the comeback of Anerood Jugnauth in elections held in 2014, Anil Gayan of the Muvman Liberater was appointed as minister. He would continue to hold the post until the elder Jugnauth's resignation as prime minister in favour of the younger Jugnauth in January 2017. Anwar Husnoo, who was a member of the ML until defecting to the MSM in late 2019, was appointed as health minister under Pravind Jugnauth's first government.

Kailesh Jagutpal was appointed as minister in November 2019 under Pravind Jugnauth's second government and subsequently a modification of the ministry's portfolio name occurred, which renamed it to the ministry of Health and Wellness. Anil Bachoo of the Labour Party succeeded Jagutpal and appointed to the Fourth Navin Ramgoolam cabinet in November 2024.

== Responsibilities ==
The ministry has the overall responsibility with the accessibility of equitable and quality health services to Mauritians and with the promotion of healthy lifestyle. As the ministry responsible for health, it advocates for policies aimed to increased efficiency and effectiveness in the health care system whilst balancing customer satisfaction.

In addition, it is also responsible for the control and prevention of diseases within the country and to provide for facilities for treatment of diseases. The rehabilitation of disabled people are also under its responsibility.

Within the profession, the ministry controls the practice of professionals including those in the field of medicine, dentistry, pharmacy and other allied health professionals. The provision of facilities for training of medical and paramedical staff and those working within the ministry are under its duties.

Any reports prepared or published related to health are within the functions of the ministry and as well as the initiation of and conducting of biomedial health studies of important and major diseases in Mauritius.

== Organisation ==
=== Departments ===
The ministry is divided in the following departments:

- HIV/AIDS and Harm Reduction Unit
- Hospital Services
- Office Accommodation Unit
- Planning, Finance and International Cooperation Unit
- Primary Health Care Unit
- Procurement and Supply Unit
- Project Implementation Unit
- Training and Research Unit
- Public Health Unit
- NCD, Health Promotion and Research Unit

== List of ministers ==
Portrait	Name	Term of office			Portfolio name	Party	Prime minister	Ref.
Portrait	Name	Took office	Left office	Time in office	Portfolio name	Party	Prime minister	Ref.
	Kher Jagatsingh	27 December 1969	August; 1971		Health	PTr	S. Ramgoolam	
	Harold Water	August; 1971	27 December 1976		Health	PTr	S. Ramgoolam	
	Mahess Teeluck	27 December 1976	24 November 1979	2 years, 332 days	Health	PTr	S. Ramgoolam	
	Beergoonath Ghurburrun	16 January 1980	15 June 1982	2 years, 150 days	Health	PTr		
	Jocelyn Seenyen	15 June 1982	22 March 1983	280 days	Health	PSM	A. Jugnauth	
	Jagdishwar Goburdhun	28 March 1983	27 August 1983	152 days	Health	PSM	A. Jugnauth	
	Jagdishwar Goburdhun	28 March 1983	27 August 1983	152 days	Health	MSM	A. Jugnauth	
	Kailash Purryag	January; 1984	December; 1985		Health	PTr	A. Jugnauth	
	Jagdishwar Goburdhun	15 August 1988	25 September 1990	2 years, 41 days	Health	MSM	A. Jugnauth	
	Prem Nababsing	25 September 1990	27 August 1993	2 years, 336 days	Health	MMM	A. Jugnauth	
	Régis Finette	27 August 1993	22 December 1995	2 years, 117 days	Health	MMM	A. Jugnauth	
	Régis Finette	27 August 1993	22 December 1995	2 years, 117 days	Health	RMM	A. Jugnauth	
	Kadress Pillay	30 December 1995	2 July 1997	1 year, 184 days	Health	PTr	N. Ramgoolam	
	Kishore Deerpalsing	2 July 1997	15 September 2000	3 years, 75 days	Health and Quality of Life	PTr	N. Ramgoolam	
	Ashok Jugnauth	18 September 2000	5 July 2005	4 years, 290 days	Health and Quality of Life	MSM	A. Jugnauth	
	Ashok Jugnauth	18 September 2000	5 July 2005	4 years, 290 days	Health and Quality of Life	MSM	Bérenger	
	Satish Faugoo	7 July 2005	13 September 2008	3 years, 68 days	Health and Quality of Life	PTr	N. Ramgoolam	
	Rajesh Jeetah	13 September 2008	11 May 2010	1 year, 240 days	Health and Quality of Life	PTr	N. Ramgoolam	
	Maya Hanoomanjee	11 May 2010	26 July 2011	1 year, 76 days	Health and Quality of Life	MSM	N. Ramgoolam	
	Lormus Bundhoo	7 August 2011	13 December 2014	3 years, 139 days	Health and Quality of Life	PTr	N. Ramgoolam	
	Anil Gayan	15 December 2014	23 January 2017	2 years, 39 days	Health and Quality of Life	ML	A. Jugnauth	
	Anwar Husnoo	23 January 2017	12 November 2019	2 years, 293 days	Health and Quality of Life	ML	P. Jugnauth	
	Anwar Husnoo	23 January 2017	12 November 2019	2 years, 293 days	Health and Quality of Life	MSM	P. Jugnauth	
	Kailesh Jagutpal	12 November 2019	12 November 2024	5 years	Health and Wellness	MSM	P. Jugnauth	
	Anil Bachoo	22 November 2024	Incumbent	1 year, 259 days	Health and Wellness	PTr	N. Ramgoolam	
