= Abortion in Mauritius =

In Mauritius, abortion is legal only in the cases of risk to life, risk to physical or mental health, risk of fetal impairment, pregnancy from rape, or pregnancy of a minor. Legal abortions must be approved by three physicians or by a police report, and they must be approved by a parent or guardian if performed on a minor. Illegal abortions are punishable by fines or prison.

During the colonial era, Mauritius inherited France's abortion ban. A complete ban on abortion in the 1838 penal code was in effect until the 21st century. In the 1980s and 1990s, concerns about unsafe abortion were raised by feminists and family planning groups. The idea of legalising abortion remained controversial; legislative debate was rare due to religious opposition to abortion. In 2012, Yatin Varma proposed an amendment legalising abortion in certain cases, which passed with multipartisan support. International organizations and some religious leaders supported the bill, while other religious leaders opposed it. Organizations such as Muvman Liberation Fam and the Mauritius Family Planning and Welfare Association have supported the legalization of abortion.

Abortion is a taboo subject in Mauritius. The abortion rate is about 10,000 to 15,000 per year, few of which are legally recorded. Abortions are frequent among adolescents and unmarried women, and are often motivated by birth control failure. The most common legal abortion method is medical abortion using Cytotec. Illegal abortions commonly use drugs or home remedies. The country has a lower rate of post-abortion care than others in Africa.

== Legislation ==
The Criminal Code of Mauritius includes exceptions permitting abortion if the pregnancy threatens the life or physical or mental health of the mother. It also permits abortion up to a gestational age of fourteen weeks if the pregnancy resulted from rape or from sex with a girl under 16. Abortions must be approved by three specialist physicians, including one OB/GYN, or be backed by a police report in the case of rape. Abortions for people under 18 must be approved by an parent or guardian. Physicians are allowed to object to abortion on conscientious grounds. Facilities must be licensed to provide abortions; the Ministry of Health has authorised five regional hospitals and several private hospitals to provide abortions, as of 2022. The number of convictions for illegal abortions was 0 in 2021 and 3 in 2022.

Section 235 of the Criminal Code sets penalties for illegal abortions. Procuring, receiving, self-inducing, or supplying materials for an illegal abortion is punishable by up to ten years of penal servitude. If an illegal abortion is performed or facilitated by a physician, surgeon, or pharmacist, this person may also be punished with penal servitude. An amendment to Section 235 criminalises false claims of legal grounds for abortion, with a sentence of ten years.

Mauritius is a signatory of the Maputo Protocol on women's rights, but is not bound to Article 14(2), which describes a right to abortion in the cases of rape or incest. The country's law does not meet this article since it requires a police report to permit abortions.

== History ==
=== Abortion ban ===
As a colony of France, Mauritius inherited France's abortion law. In July 1778, the highest court of Mauritius affirmed the French abortion ban, which made the offense punishable by death, "in the interest of laws of religion and of the state." During this era, abortion was common among enslaved women; Malagasy slaves in particular faced accusations of abortion and infanticide.

Mauritius enacted its penal code in 1810, based on the French Penal Code of 1793. In 1838, the penal code added an abortion ban adapted from that of France. Section 235 of the penal code prohibited abortion:

(1) Any person who, by any food, drink, medicine, or by violence, or by any other means, procures the miscarriage of any woman quick with child, or supplies the means of procuring such miscarriage, whether the woman consents or not, shall be punished by penal servitude for a term not exceeding 10 years.
(2) The like punishment shall be pronounced against any woman who procures her own miscarriage, or who consents to make use of the means pointed out or administered to her with that intent, if such miscarriage ensues.

Under this law, abortion was permitted only if the pregnant woman was in a life-threatening condition, and the 1977 Supreme Court case Anath v. Rex ruled that physicians cannot provide legal testimony about patients' conditions without consent. The law also defined that abortion only occurs if done after the beginning of pregnancy. However, by 1983, the country's health providers had not yet received training in procedures to prevent pregnancy before implantation.

Unsafe abortion was one of the leading issues of the 1980s wave of feminism in Mauritius. A 1994 motion to the National Assembly to legalise abortion failed due to opposition by Christian leaders. The same year, the International Planned Parenthood Federation and the Mauritius Family Planning and Welfare Association (MFPWA) led a conference in Mauritius about unsafe abortion in Africa. The 21 national delegations signed the Mauritius Declaration, agreeing to combat unsafe abortion, increase access to family planning, ensure emergency post-abortion treatment, provide post-abortion counseling, and remove laws limiting safe abortion. At the conference, Minister of Health Régis Finette voiced a pro-life stance against abortion, which was protested by women's rights groups. In 2004, the rate of abortions in Mauritius was equal to the rate of live births. By this time, the government was working to make the law more permissive. Mauritius was one of the first ten countries to sign the 2003 Maputo Protocol.

The Ministry of Health reported in 2007, "In Mauritius, abortion for social or personal reasons is illegal as stipulated in the law of 1838 except in cases where the mother's life is in danger. In order for the woman to procure the abortion, it has to be approved by the Supreme Court. The process is so long that there is no reported case where this has ever been accomplished. This law has never been reviewed, but there are reports that abortion is an issue in Mauritius." Under the ban, some Mauritian women traveled to receive legal abortions in Réunion. Abortions in Réunion were safe, but providers charged higher prices for Mauritians, which many could not afford. The 2009 Contraceptive Prevalence Survey found that Mauritius had between 15,000 and 20,000 abortions per year.

The government had never debated the legalisation of abortion, partly due to the prevalence of anti-abortion views by Catholics and by Muslims. Women's rights groups were divided over the issue, with some calling for an amendment to the abortion law. The Common Front on Abortion formed after the 2009 case of Marie-Noelle Derby, a reporter who died from an abortion. The association demanded the suspension of the abortion ban. It included MFPWA, Muvman Liberasyon Fam (MLF), and Women in Networking; it was supported by organizations including SOS Femmes and Genderlinks. After the death of therapeutic abortion patient Marie Sharonne Marla in the same year, the Common Front on Abortion argued that, if the term "quick with child" referred to quickening, which occurs at 20 weeks of pregnancy, the law would permit earlier abortions. This was the first time the quickening argument was brought to the Attorney-General.

=== 2012 amendment ===
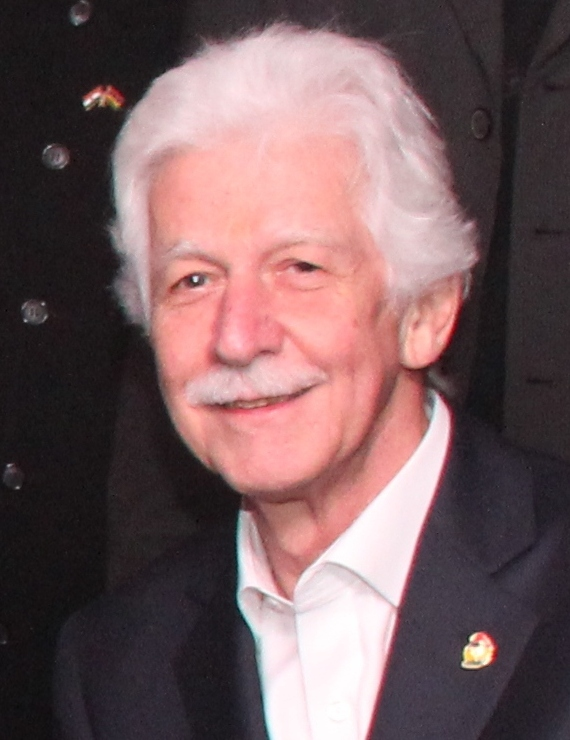
Leader of the Opposition Paul Bérenger supported the 2012 amendment to permit abortion in certain cases.

The Criminal Code amendment was introduced to the National Assembly in 2012 and enacted in October of that year, with 20% of members voting in opposition. This law permitted abortion in cases of rape or incest, pregnancy of a minor, or if the pregnancy posed a risk of physical or mental health problems or fetal abnormalities. The Mauritius Times wrote that this law had been "dormant for nearly two centuries". At the time, it was estimated that the country had thousands of illegal abortions annually. The advocacy of a Mauritian member of the Convention on the Elimination of All Forms of Discrimination against Women Committee influenced the reform.

Attorney General Yatin Varma proposed the Criminal Code (Amendment) Bill, saying he supported freedom of choice. Leader of the Opposition Paul Bérenger supported the bill and called a special session to debate it. On 20 May, 400 anti-abortion protestors assembled in front of the National Assembly, which was debating the bill. Political parties did not take stances on the amendment, and the vote was not split along party lines. The amendment passed 50 to 14.

The Catholic Bishop of Port-Louis, Maurice Piat; the Anglican Bishop of the Indian Ocean, Ian Ernest; and the Vicar of Rodrigues, Alain Harel, wrote to the parliament opposing the legalization of abortion unless the pregnancy risks death. Piat affirmed the Catholic Church's views on abortion and the principle of double effect. The religious coalition Platform for Life, which included Catholic, Anglican, Muslim, Buddhist leaders, was formed to oppose the bill. Some members of the Catholic Church considered a hunger strike to oppose the law. The United Nations and Amnesty International supported the law. The country's Council of Religions wrote in support of abortion access "in certain very specific cases".

When the law was passed, Varma said, "This is a historic day for the country." MLF said, "We've been waiting for this law for years. But the state must completely decriminalise abortion." The anti-abortion group Mouvement d'Aide à la Maternité said, "We will always defend the right to life. It is up the soul and conscience of every member of parliament to vote." Minister of Health Lormus Budhoo announced that five hospitals met the requirements to be abortion providers.

=== Post-2012 ===
In 2018, MP Kavy Ramano said that abortion should be decriminalszed. MLF founder and writer Lindsey Collen and MFPWA president Vidya Charan have argued that the grounds for legal abortion are too restrictive. Collen said in 2019 that attitudes had shifted, saying, "Society does not blame women who have abortions anymore." The group L'Action Familiale has opposed legal abortion.

A case of infanticide 3 January 2022 led to protests against the abortion ban. The same year, gynaecologist Arvind Ramgulam had his licence revoked for performing abortions, prompting debate about the ban. The Ministry of Health developed a sexual and reproductive health plan in 2022, which addressed abortion. In 2023, the ministry began the first study on the causes and effects of illegal abortion in Mauritius. A case of infanticide in Chemin-Grenier in April 2025, as well as another in Rose-Hill in August 2025, sparked further debate about abortion.

== Prevalence ==
In 2013, MLF and MFPWA estimated that the country's abortion rate was between 10,000 and 15,000 per year. This was much higher than the Ministry of Health's official abortion statistics, which comprised 3 cases in 2015, 14 in 2016 and 7 in 2017. The annual incidences of abortion complications were over 400. In 2018, the United Nations reported a "high number of pregnancies among adolescents and non-medical abortions". Most women who receive abortions are aged 16 to 23 and are unmarried. The most common reason is failure of birth control. Abortion is a taboo subject in the country, and it is controversial among women's rights activists. Abortion-rights activists have pushed for increased discussion of the subject.

The most common abortion method prescribed by doctors is Cytotec. Illegal abortions may be induced with drugs or with home remedies that induce vaginal contractions. According to anthropologist Laurence Pourchez, folk healers in Mauritius describe tisanes with ingredients such as red pineapple leaves as abortifacients. Other abortifacient plants were introduced from India, including papaya and peepal, although other medical uses of these plants are more common in Mauritius. Abortions using traditional remedies often result in complications requiring medical care, often among minors. The rate of treatment of post-abortion complications is 3–4 per 1,000 women of reproductive age, lower than many African countries.
