= Rama Valayden =

Mauritian politician

Jayarama Valayden

Attorney General
- In office 2005–2009
- Preceded by: Emmanuel Leung Shing
- Succeeded by: Yatindra Nath Varma

Personal details
- Born: 15 November 1963 Stanley, Rose Hill, British Mauritius
- Party: Mouvement Républicain
- Occupation: Lawyer

Jayarama Valayden, most commonly known as Rama Valayden is a Mauritian lawyer, social worker and politician.

== Early life and education ==
He was born in 1963 in Stanley (Rose Hill) Rama Valayden attended primary school Notre Dame des Victoires RCA. He then attended secondary school St. Andrews School in Rose Hill. In 1976 he formed the Sport and Literary Club of Hugnin Road.

== Family ==
Rama Valayden is married to Taslima Valayden and together they had son, Rama Jr.

== Political career ==
Just before the 1982 General Elections he launched a movement named Groupement Révolutionnaire Mauricien. Rama Valayden launched a new party Mouvement Républicain in 1996 after distancing himself from the PMSD. He was candidate at the September 1999 by-elections in Constituency No. 20 but he was defeated by his rival Xavier Duval.

At the July 2005 General Elections he was candidate of Alliance Sociale in Constituency No. 19 but he was not elected as rival alliance MSM-MMM won all three seats in that constituency. However he was appointed as Attorney General from 2005 to 2009 as his party MR was in alliance with the winning coalition of PTR-PMXD-VF-MR-MMSM.

At the May 2010 General Elections Rama Valayden was candidate of the PTr-PMSD-MSM coalition but he was not elected.

In preparation for the November 2019 General Elections Rama Valayden was expecting the Labour Party to support his candidacy but this did not materialize. In the aftermath of Labour Party's poor performance in 2019 Rama Valayden blamed poor leadership and chaos within the party for its repeated defeat.

== Publications ==
In 2013 Rama Valayden co-published the book Wrongfully Convicted: Amicale case following the 1999 arson and murders at the gambling house known as "L'Amicale" in Port Louis which were also known as 1999 L'Amicale riots.

He has also written a number of newspaper articles on miscarriage of justice (such as the beheading of political prisoner Ratsitatane), and the need to implement the recommendations of the 2011 Truth and Justice Commission (to repair the ever-lasting consequences of slavery and indentured servitude). Rama Valayden also wrote on environmental issues, such as the disappearance of Baobab and Mapou trees in Mauritius.
