= Moilin Jean Ah-Chuen =

Sino-Mauritian politician

Jean Etienne Moilin Ah-Chuen
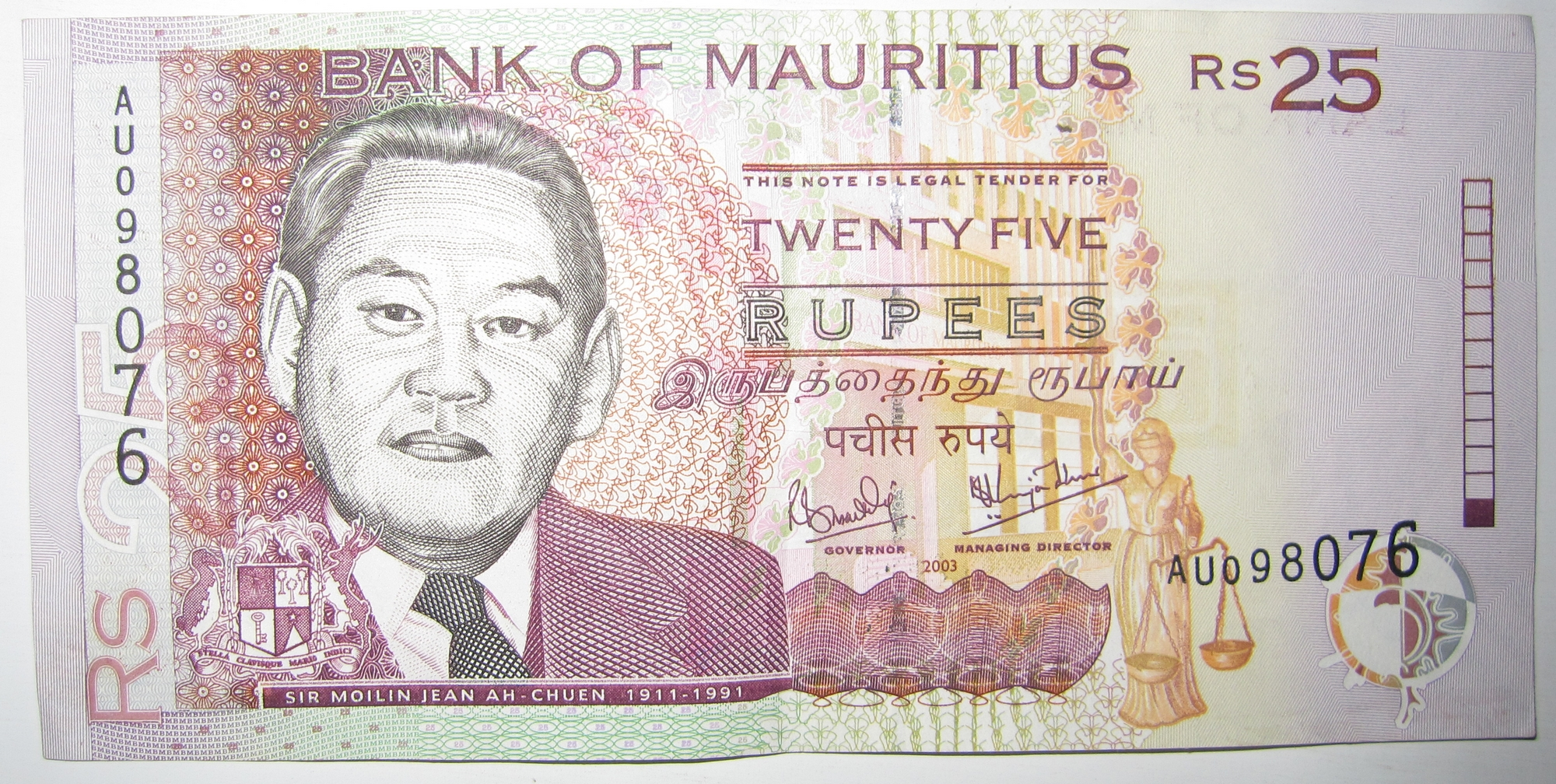
- Moilin Jean Ah-Chuen image on 25 Mauritian rupee

First Chinese Cabinet Minister
- In office 1967–1976
- Monarch: Elizabeth II
- Prime Minister: Seewoosagur Ramgoolam

First Chinese Member, Legislative Council
- Incumbent
- Assumed office 1963

Personal details
- Born: 1911 Meizhou, Guangdong, China
- Died: October 1991 (aged 79–80)
- Party: PMSD
- Children: 11
- Profession: Businessman, politician
- Awards: Knighted by Queen Elizabeth II

Sir Jean Etienne Moilin Ah-Chuen (Chinese: 朱梅麟; 1911–1991) was a Sino-Mauritian politician and businessman from Mauritius. He was First Chinese Cabinet Minister from 1967 to 1976 and First Chinese Member, Legislative Council in 1963. He was decorated by Pope John Paul II and knighted by Queen Elizabeth II. He is also the founder ABC Group, a diversified conglomerate with investments in banking, foods industry, automobile, and shipping in Mauritius.

== Family background and history ==
His father, Chu Wei Chuen, arrived in Mauritius from Meizhou Prefecture, Guangdong, China in 1887. His dad was like many Hakka Chinese who went abroad in search of a better livelihood. He was 14 years old. His dream was simple – start a business, make a fortune and return home. He started a grocery store in the vicinity of one of the sugar cane factories. By the time he died, he was the owner of three shops in the country.

Jean Moilin was the second son of Chu Wei Chuen. He learned how to manage the family's shop from his father.

Jean was an active person, he gave his time to the community and worked with several associations. He was the co-founder of the Chinese Daily News, a Chinese newspaper outlet in Mauritius.

== Career ==
In 1931, at the age of twenty, Jean set up his own convenience shop in Port-Louis at 18 Queen Street. The store was called ABC, which stands for 'Au Bazar Central' (At the Central Market) because it was situated opposite the central market. He was later joined by his sons in the business. He took over the small business and expanded it into a highly diversified company now includes departments dedicated to car imports, banking, financial and insurance services, foods production and distribution, and shipping and freight.

In 2017, ABC Group was named as one of the leading business organizations in Mauritius by Forbes Magazine with his son was named as one of the multi-millionaire businessmen in Mauritius.

Moilin Jean Ah-Chuen became one of the most successful entrepreneurs in Mauritius. He was also one of the founding members of the Mauritius Union Assurance in 1948, a company specialising in insurance, pensions and investments that is listed on the Stock Exchange of Mauritius under the symbol MUA. The group has operations in several countries across East Africa.

== Politics ==
At the age of 31, he became the youngest president of the Chinese Chamber of Commerce. This position marked the start of his political career. Under his charge, the chamber played an important role in providing food to the Chinese community in Mauritius during World War II when Japanese warships and submarines disrupted the food supply to the island nation.

As an influencer in the community, he was asked in 1948 by the British Colonial Government to sit as a member of the Legislative Assembly as a representative of the Chinese community.

At the March 1959 general elections he was defeated by Sheik Y. Ramjan in Constituency No.5 Port Louis Maritime. He was elected at the October 1963 elections in Constituency No.5. At the August 1967 elections he was a candidate of the PMSD in Constituency No.3 Port Louis Maritime & East, and along with Dawood Patel and Oozeerally of the PMSD Ah Cheun was elected to the Legislative Council. However at the December 1976 elections Ah Cheun was not elected when he stood as candidate of the Labour-CAM coalition in Constituency No.1 GRNW and Port Louis West. He served as Minister of Local Government after Mauritius became independent in 1968 when Seewoosagur Ramgoolam was the prime minister.

The Ministry of Local Government is responsible for local government matters in Mauritius and Jean Ah-Chuen played a key role in the industrialisation of the country after independence. He was instrumental in establishing the Mauritius free-trade zone. Through his connections, the first investors from Taiwan and Hong Kong came to Mauritius to set up textiles operations which helped to reduce unemployment in the country.

In 1980, Moilin Jean Ah-Chuen was knighted by Queen Elizabeth II.

== Legacy ==
He died in October 1991, and left a legacy to his 11 children.

Between 2000 and 2002, his daughter Marie Madeleine Lee, served as the first Mauritian ambassador to China. She had previously served in Taiwan's Legislative Yuan from 1981 to 1984. His brother-in-law, Pierre Leung Shing, was appointed to Taiwan's Control Yuan in 1987. A nephew, Emmanuel Leung Shing, led the Ministry of Justice from 2001 to 2005.

In honor of his contribution to the country, Sir Jean Moilin's portrait was printed on the 25-rupee banknotes in Mauritius in 1998.

In 2007, his children decided to transform the family's old residence in Rose-Hill into a museum and Memorial center. The museum opened to the public two years later in 2009.

His biography was written by Lilianne Berthelot, a Mauritian author, and was published in 2008.

In 2011, the Mauritius Post also issued a postage stamp to commemorate his birth centenary.
