= 1999 L'Amicale riots =

Sports riots in Mauritius

1999 L'Amicale Riots
- Date: 23 May 1999 – 26 May 1999
- Location: La Chaussée Street, Port Louis, Mauritius
- Caused by: Angry supporters of Scouts soccer club
- Methods: rioting, looting, property damage, protests
- Result: 7 dead

The 1999 L'Amicale Riots started in the evening of Sunday 23 May 1999 in Port Louis, the capital of Mauritius after angry supporters of Scouts Club vandalised several buildings as their team had lost a match against rival soccer club Fire Brigade. A few hours later a gambling house called L'Amicale caught fire, causing the death of seven individuals who were trapped inside. This example of football hooliganism became known as L'Affaire L' Amicale in the years following the original riots.

== Background ==
The soccer match between Fire Brigade versus Scouts Club ended by 17:00 at Anjalay Stadium in Belle Vue. The club Fire Brigade had won the game with a score of 1–0 after being awarded a controversial penalty. This triggered protests and incidents amongst the supporters of the rival teams who were present at Anjalay Stadium. Sugar cane fields were torched in rural areas. When the supporters returned to the capital city of Port Louis they vandalised a number of buildings including the office of Mauritius Football Association, Emmanuel Anquetil building and the Pope Hennessy Police Station.

By 19:00 a gambling house known as L’Amicale, located along Royal Street, became engulfed in flames with 275 people trapped inside after rioters threw "Cocktail Molotov " and fire bombs through the historic building's windows and cars on fire blocked all exits. Firefighters took hours to suppress the fire. Subsequently, inside the L'Amicale building seven badly burnt bodies were recovered. The victims were Yeh Lin Lai Yau Tim, Jean-Alain Law Wing, Eugénie Lai Yau Tim, Catherine Lai Yau Tim, Jeannette Ramboro, Krishna Luckoo, and Abdoo Hakim Fawzi.

Historically the Scouts Club had been known as Muslim Scouts Club as all players and most of its fans were Muslims. On the hand the Fire Brigade players and fans were mostly of Roman Catholic faith and of Creole ethnicity. Local authorities feared that the Port Louis riots would escalate into larger ethnic riots between Creoles and Muslims. Thus the government imposed an 18-month nationwide ban on all soccer games. Only the national team was allowed to play during this period.

== Aftermath of riots ==
In protest against the deaths and violence thousands of Mauritians marched in the streets. In total 25 arrests were made by local police during the week following the riots.

On 20 November 2000 police charged four supporters of Scouts Club (Sheik Imram Sumodhee, Khaleeloudeen Sumodhee, Abdool Naseeb Keeramuth and Muhammad Shafiq Nawoor). They were subsequently tried and sentenced by judge Paul Lam Shang Leen to 45 years in prison for burning the L'Amicale gaming house, which caused the deaths of seven persons trapped inside.

A group of 12 lawyers consisting of former attorney-general Rama Valayden, barrister Raouf Gulbul, Neelkanth Dulloo, Sanjeev Teeluckdharry, Sameer Hossenbaccus, Ravi Rutnah and 6 others compiled a report entitled Wrongfully Convicted which attempted to highlight flaws in the judgement against the Amicale Four. They released the report on 23 May 2013 in which they suggested that the arson of L'Amicale gaming house seemed to be the work of the Escadron de la mort (Squadron of Death), which was a gang of vigilantes who performed voluntary social work to combat drug traffickers but which had transformed into a radicalized sectarian group.

By 2015 their sentence was commuted to 18 years in prison by the Power Commission of Grace. Their release was scheduled for 17 March 2019 but in January 2018 their lawyers had sent a letter to Prime Minister Pravind Jugnauth to inform him of a “miscalculation of the prison administration.” The authorities thus granted their request. On 23 August 2018 the four convicted men were released from Riche Lieu Prison after spending 19 years there.

Given that several fires started simultaneously it is believed that they had been meticulously planned instead of being random events. As a result, firemen could not attend to all the sites at the same time as there were more than 100 calls asking for help. Rama Valayden has detailed other forms of evidence in his 2014 report Wrongly Convicted. Soon after their acquittal some of the four accused supporters of the Scouts Club received threats in order to discourage them from seeking justice.
