= Pierre Leung Shing =

Pierre Wong Sen Leung Shing CBE (4 March 1916 – 18 January 2004) was a Mauritian politician.

Pierre Wong Sen Leung Shing was born in Mauritius on 4 March 1916. He moved to China as a child, living there until his parents died, then returned to Mauritius. After completing his education, Leung Shing founded a business conglomerate. He married Madeleine Rose Leung Shing, a sister of Moilin Jean Ah-Chuen, in 1943. The couple raised five children: Emmanuel, Georges, Thérèse, Noël, and Louis Pierre. Pierre Leung Shing was appointed to Taiwan's Control Yuan in 1987, as a representative of Overseas Chinese in Africa. He died on 18 January 2004. His wife died in 2014.
