= Kailesh Jagutpal =

Mauritian politician

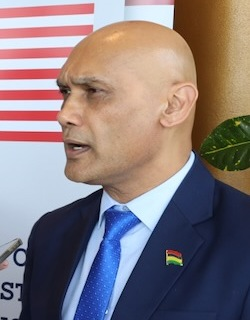
- Jagutpal in 2024

Minister of Health and Wellness
- In office 12 November 2019 – 12 November 2024
- Prime Minister: Pravind Jugnauth
- Preceded by: Anwar Husnoo
- Succeeded by: Anil Bachoo

Personal details
- Born: 1 November 1969 (age 56) Grand Bois, Mauritius
- Party: Militant Socialist Movement
- Education: Banaras Hindu University

Kailesh Kumar Singh Jagutpal (born 1 November 1969) is a Mauritian politician. He served as Minister of Health and Wellness from 2019 until 2024.

== Early life, education & medical career ==
Kailesh Jagutpal grew up in the village of Grand Bois which is located in the district of Savanne District in the south of Mauritius. He attended the Sookdeo Bissoondoyal State Secondary School before completing his secondary education at the Royal College Curepipe. Then he studied medicine at Patna Medical College and Hospital in Bihar, India before returning to Mauritius where he joined the Civil Service as Medical and Health Officer. From 2004 to 2006 he specialised in Psychiatry by studying at the Banaras Hindu University in Varanasi, India before returning to Mauritius. In addition to his role as psychiatrist at the Jawaharlal Nehru Hospital in Rose-Belle he was also elected as Chairman of the Medical Council of Mauritius, a position which he held from 2016 to 2019.

== Political career ==
At the 07 November 2019 general elections Kailesh Jagutpal stood as candidate of the MSM within the L'Alliance Morisien. He was elected as First Member for Constituency No.13 Rivière des Anguilles-Souillac in the National Assembly. On 12 November 2019 he was appointed Minister of Health and Wellness. Within this portfolio he is responsible for medical and public health services, population planning, quality of Life and population wellness, national AIDS secretariat, trust fund for specialised medical care, Mauritius Institute of Health and licensing of private health institutions.
