= List of ambassadors of Mauritius to China =

Ambassador of Mauritius to China
- Incumbent; Marie Roland Alain Wong Yen Cheong since April 14, 2021
- Inaugural holder: Ameen Kasenally
- Formation: May 18, 1973

The Mauritian ambassador in Beijing is the official representative of the Government in Port Louis to the Government of the People's Republic of China.

== List of representatives ==
Diplomatic agrément/Diplomatic accreditation	Ambassador	Observations	Prime Minister of Mauritius	Premier of the People's Republic of China	Term end
April 15, 1972		The governments in Port Louis and Beijing established diplomatic relations.	Seewoosagur Ramgoolam	Zhou Enlai	
May 18, 1973	Ameen Kasenally		Seewoosagur Ramgoolam	Zhou Enlai	1976
April 30, 1976	Ahmed Ould Menneya		Anerood Jugnauth	Hua Guofeng	
1981	Abdool Hak Mohamed Osman		Anerood Jugnauth	Zhao Ziyang	1982
October 11, 1988	Dhurma Gian Nath		Anerood Jugnauth	Li Peng	
August 20, 1996	Rhafic Jahangeer		Anerood Jugnauth	Li Peng	
June 12, 2000	Marie Madeleine Lee	née AH CHUEN 朱志筠	Anerood Jugnauth	Zhu Rongji	
July 8, 2002	Lim Kwat Chow Lam Po Tang	"Setai" LAM PO TANG 林德超 Tang	Anerood Jugnauth	Zhu Rongji	
March 15, 2006	Paul Reynold Lit Fong Chong Leung	Paul CHONG LEUNG 钟律芳	Anerood Jugnauth	Wen Jiabao	
August 19, 2015	Miao Kwong Lee Hon Chong	André LEE 李淼光	Anerood Jugnauth	Li Keqiang	
