= Paul Chong Leung =

Mauritian barrister, politician, and diplomat

Paul Reynold Lit Fong Chong Leung (simplified Chinese: 钟律芳; traditional Chinese: 鍾律芳) is a Mauritian barrister, politician, and diplomat.

Paul Chong Leung has practiced law since 1971, and is a partner of GlobaLexChambers. He was a member of the National Assembly for two decades, and led the Ministry of Justice from 1978 to 1982. Leung was ambassador of Mauritius to China from 2006 to 2015.

He is married to Joan Chong Leung.
