= Marie Madeleine Lee =

Mauritian politician, diplomat and business executive (1932–2026)

- 李朱志筠
- Born: 1932; Mauritius
- Died: 26 February 2026 (aged 93–94)
- Education: National Taiwan University
- Occupations: Politician, Diplomat, Business executive
- Title: Mauritian Ambassador to China (2000–2002)
- Parent: Moilin Jean Ah-Chuen (father)
- Honors: GOSK (2014)

Marie Madeleine Lee (Chinese: 李朱志筠; 1932 – 26 February 2026) was a Mauritian politician, diplomat, and business executive. She was a member of the Legislative Yuan in the Republic of China (Taiwan) from 1981 to 1984, then served as Mauritian ambassador to the People's Republic of China between 2000 and 2002.

== Career ==
Born in 1932, Marie Madeleine Lee was the daughter of Moilin Jean Ah-Chuen. Her grandfather, Chu Wei Chuen, was a native of Guangdong. Lee graduated from National Taiwan University where she studied foreign languages and literature. In Mauritius, Lee led an overseas Chinese association, and the alumni association of the Chung-Hwa Middle School. Lee's Mauritian business interests included a clothing factory, an investment firm, and a transportation company. She served a single term on the Taiwan-based Legislative Yuan from 1981 to 1984, representing overseas Chinese. Lee began serving as the Mauritian ambassador to the People's Republic of China, from 30 March 2000, and formally presented diplomatic credentials to Chinese Communist Party general secretary Jiang Zemin on 12 June 2000. She was succeeded as ambassador by Lim Kwat Chow Lam Po Tang.

In 2014, Lee was made a Grand Officer of the Order of the Star and Key of the Indian Ocean. Madeleine Ah-Chuen met her future husband, Joseph Lee, while a student at National Taiwan University. Lee died on 26 February 2026.
