= Mauritian Militant Socialist Movement =

Political party in Mauritius

- Leader: Madan Dulloo
- Founded: 1995
- Dissolved: 2008
- Merged into: Mauritian Militant Movement
- Ideology: Socialism

The Mauritian Militant Socialist Movement (French: Mouvement Militant Socialiste Mauricien) was a political party in Mauritius headed by Madan Dulloo. At the legislative elections of 3 July 2005, the party was part of the Alliance Sociale that won 42 out of 70 seats, where the MMSM won 2 seats by Madan Dulloo in constituency no. 6 and Sutyadeo Moutia in constituency no. 11. Dr Parmanund Brizmohun, who stood in constituency no. 17 for the party was not elected.

On March 16, 2008, Dulloo said at a public meeting held by his party that the party was unhappy with Ramgoolam and the government's performance. The Prime Minister, Navinchandra Ramgoolam, responded by revoking Dulloo from his position as Foreign Minister on March 2008. The Mauritian Militant Socialist Movement was dissolved a few days later and Dulloo joined the Mauritian Militant Movement, the party where Dulloo started his political career. However, Sutyadeo Moutia remained with the government.
