= Lindsey Collen =

South African-born novelist based in Mauritius (born 1948)

Lindsey Collen (born 1948 in Mqanduli, Umtata, Transkei, South Africa) is a Mauritian novelist, and activist. She won the 1994 and 2005 Commonwealth Writers' Prize, Best Book, Africa.

Her work has appeared in the New Internationalist. She is a member of Lalit de Klas.

She married Ram Seegobin. She lives in Mauritius.

== Works ==
- There is a Tide, Port Louis, Mauritius: Ledikasyon pu Travayer, 1990
- The Rape of Sita. Feminist Press. 1993. ISBN 978-1-55861-393-5.
- Getting Rid of it, London: Granta Books, 1997, ISBN 978-1-86207-079-0.
- Mutiny, London: Bloomsbury, 2001, ISBN 978-0-7475-5265-9.
- Boy, London: Bloomsbury, 2004, ISBN 978-0-7475-6387-7.
- The Malaria Man & her Neighbours, Port Louis, Mauritius: Ledikasyon pu Travayer, 2010, ISBN 978-99903-33-67-1.

=== Chapbooks ===
- Komye fwa mo finn trap enn pikan ursen, Ledikasyon pu travayer, 1997, ISBN 978-99903-33-18-3.
- Natir imin: Mauritian Creole & English versions, Ledikasyon pu travayer, 2000, ISBN 978-99903-33-31-2.

=== Anthologies ===
- Yvonne Vera, ed. (1999). "Enigma". Opening spaces: an anthology of contemporary African women's writing. Heinemann. ISBN 978-0-435-91010-5.
- Chris Brazier, ed. (2008). "Letters from Bambous". Letters from the Edge: 12 Women of the World Write Home. New Internationalist. ISBN 978-1-904456-97-1.
