= Anil Bachoo =

Minister of Health and Wellness

Anil Bachoo GOSK
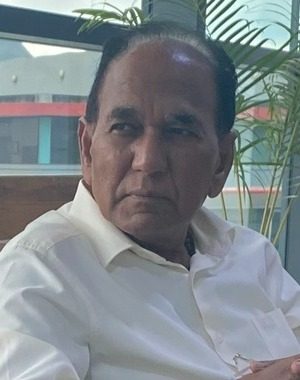
- Bachoo in 2025.

Minister of Health and Wellness
- Incumbent
- Assumed office 22 November 2024
- Prime Minister: Navin Ramgoolam
- Preceded by: Kailesh Jagutpal

Vice-Prime Minister of Mauritius
- In office 7 August 2011 – 13 December 2014
- President: Anerood Jugnauth; Kailash Purryag
- Prime Minister: Navin Ramgoolam
- Preceded by: Pravind Jugnauth
- Succeeded by: Showkutally Soodhun
Ministerial offices 1991–2014
Minister of Public Infrastructure, Land Transport and Shipping Public Infrastructure and Land Transport (2004–2005)
In office 13 September 2008 – 13 December 2014
Prime Minister	Navin Ramgoolam
Preceded by	Rashid Beebeejaun
Succeeded by	Nando Bodha (Public Infrastructure and Land Transport); Prem Koonjoo (Shipping)
In office 17 September 2000 – 3 February 2005
Prime Minister	Anerood Jugnauth; Paul Bérenger
Succeeded by	Rashid Beebeejaun
Minister of National Development Unit
In office 11 May 2010 – 13 December 2014
Prime Minister	Navin Ramgoolam
Preceded by	Lormus Bundhoo (Environment and NDU)
Succeeded by	Anerood Jugnauth (Rodrigues and NDU)
In office 7 July 2005 – 13 September 2008
Preceded by	Rajesh Bhagwan (Environment and NDU)
Succeeded by	Lormus Bundhoo (Environment and NDU)
Minister of Environment
In office 7 July 2005 – 13 September 2008
Prime Minister	Navin Ramgoolam
Preceded by	Rajesh Bhagwan (Environment and NDU)
Succeeded by	Lormus Bundhoo (Environment and NDU)
Minister of Works
In office 1994–1994
Prime Minister	Anerood Jugnauth
Minister of Trade and Shipping
In office 27 September 1991 – 1993
Prime Minister	Anerood Jugnauth
Succeeded by
Senior political offices
General Secretary of Labour Party
In office 1983–1987
Leader of Mouvement Travailliste Démocrate (MTD)
In office 1987–1995
Succeeded by
Parliamentary offices
Member of Parliament; for Flacq and Bon Accueil
Incumbent
Assumed office 11 November 2024
Preceded by	Sudheer Maudhoo
In office 11 September 2000 – 6 October 2014
Preceded by	Vinod Bojeenauth
Succeeded by	Raj Dayal
In office 15 September 1991 – 16 November 1995
Preceded by	Vinod Bojeenauth
Succeeded by	Vinod Bojeenauth

Personal details
- Born: 6 September 1953 (age 72) Rivière du Rempart, British Mauritius
- Party: Labour Party (2010–present)
- Other political affiliations: Mouvement Socialiste Démocrate (2005–2010); Militant Socialist Movement (1995–2005); Mouvement Travailliste Démocrate (1987–1995); Labour Party (1978–1987)
- Spouse: Shanondevi Bachoo
- Profession: Secondary school teacher (Hinduism)

Anil Kumar Bachoo GOSK (born 6 September 1953), also known as Anil Baichoo, is a Mauritian politician who has been Minister of Health and Wellness since November 2024. A member of the Labour Party, Bachoo has previously held the office of vice-prime minister under Navin Ramgoolam's government from 2011 to 2014.

== Teaching career ==
Anil Bachoo obtained a PGCE from the Mauritius College and worked as a secondary school teacher from 1972 to 1978. He obtained a Bachelor of Arts (BA) degree from India and then taught Hinduism at Eastern College located in Flacq. From 1995 to 2000, as a break from active politics, he was the deputy rector of Universal College, a secondary school located in the rural district of Rivière du Rempart.

== Political career ==
Bachoo joined the youth wing of the Labour Party (Jeunes Travaillistes) in 1978. He was a candidate of the Parti de l’Alliance Nationale (Labour Party-PMSD) for the first time in 1982 at Constituency No.7 Piton-Rivière-du-Rempart, but was not elected as he came out in fourth place (24.3% of votes) behind the 3 candidates of Alliance MMM PSM, that is, Anerood Jugnauth (78.33%), Dharam Gokhool (73.41%) and Mahen Utchanah (72.66%).

Bachoo did not receive the investiture of any party for the August 1983 elections, despite being the general secretary of the Labour Party.

On 9 May 1987 he was one of the 20 members who left the Labour Party which was being led by Satcam Boolell. The other defectors included Sanjit Teelock, Simadree Virahsawmy, Yousuf Mohamed, Oomajee Saccaram, Shiva Sidayya, Megduth Chumroo and Claude Desroches and they formed a splinter group and party called Mouvement Travailliste Démocrate (MTD). MTD adopted a lotus as its symbol. The MTD formed a short-lived alliance with the MMM and Sylvio Michel's FTS. At the 30 August 1987 General Elections he was a candidate of L'Union MMM MTD FTS at Constituency No. 9 - Flacq and Bon Accueil but he was again not elected, coming out in 4th place behind Vinod Bojeenauth (MSM-PTr), Rajnarain Guttee (MSM-PTr) and Iswurdeo Seetaram (MSM-PTr).

At the 1991 General Elections, Anil Bachoo was a candidate of the MSM and was elected for the first time in his career to the Legislative Assembly as part of the MMM-MSM coalition. In 1993 Bachoo remained in the MSM government, whilst some of the MMM parliamentarians joined the opposition after the break-up of the ruling MMM-MSM alliance, and the remaining MMM MPs formed a new party called the RMM.

Bachoo was a candidate of the MSM-RMM coalition at the December 1995 General Elections in Constituency No.9 Flacq Bon-Accueil but came out in fourth place with only 34% of votes, heavily defeated by candidates (Vinod Bojeenauth, Ajay Gunness and Gian Nath) of the rival Labour-MMM alliance led by Navin Ramgoolam and Paul Bérenger. After this electoral defeat and a dispute with general secretary Sanjit Teelock over the future of the MTD, Bachoo left the MTD to join the MSM. Bachoo wished to dissolve the MTD into the MSM but Teelock did not agree, and Bachoo went back to secondary school teaching until 2000.

In preparation for the September 2000 General Elections, Bachoo played a key role in forging the MSM/MMM alliance which would eventually enable Paul Bérenger to become the first non-Hindu Prime Minister of Mauritius. At these elections Bachoo ran as candidate of the MSM/MMM alliance in Constituency No. 9 and was elected with 65% of votes at the top of the list, ahead of his running mates Sangeet Fowdar and Prem Koonjoo who defeated Ramesh Sunt, Lormesh Bundhoo and Dan Beeharry of the Alliance PTr-PMXD.

Along with Mukeshwar Choonee and Megduth Chumroo, Bachoo left the MSM in February 2005 and formed a new party that they called Mouvement Socialiste Démocrate (MSD) in preparation for the 3 July 2005 General Elections. The MSD was essentially a remake of the defunct MTD which would continue to undermine the voter base of the Labour Party, as well as jeopardise the number of seats for Labour. However, the MSD allianced with the Labour Party to form Alliance Sociale. Bachoo was a candidate at Constituency No.9 and came out once again at the top of the list with 60.7% of votes, followed by his allies Rajen Mungur and Dharam Gokhool. From 12 July 2005 to 13 September 2008, he was the Minister of Environment and NDU, and then became Minister of Public Infrastructure until the May 2010 elections.

After the 2010 General Elections, Bachoo was elected at the top of the list in Constituency No.9 with 65.9% of votes, followed by the other candidates of Alliance PTR-PMSD-MSM Dhiraj Singh Khamajeet and Prithvirajsing Roopun. Bachoo again held the portfolio of the Ministry of Public Infrastructure. In 2011 he was also made the Vice Prime Minister. He led these ministries until dissolution of parliament before the 2014 General Elections.

As a candidate of the Labour-MMM alliance at Constituency No.9 at the December 2014 General Elections, Bachoo was defeated by rival candidates of MSM-led Alliance Lepep, namely Raj Dayal, Rajcoomar Rampertab and Prithvirajsing Roopun. Bachoo came out in fourth place with 42.29% of votes.

Bachoo was once again defeated at Constituency No.9 at the November 2019 General Elections as a candidate of L'Alliance Nationale led by the Labour Party. He came out in fourth place (42.5% of votes) after the 3 candidates of L'Alliance Morisien, namely Sudheer Maudhoo (50.3%), Deepak Balgobin (49.7%), and Vikash Nuckcheddy (47.2%). This second consecutive defeat at general elections was mainly attributed to Bachoo's diminishing influence on socio-cultural organisations such as the Mauritius Sanathan Dharma Temple’s Federation (MSDTF).

At the 10 November 2024 elections Bachoo came out at the top of the list as a candidate of Alliance du Changement at Constituency No.9 with 58.7% of votes, ahead of R. Beechook and C.Ramkalawon who were also elected. On 22 November 2024 Bachoo took an oath as the new Minister of Health and Wellness, forming part of the new cabinet of 24 ministers and 10 junior ministers, but despite the size of his ministry no junior minister was appointed to assist him.

== Controversies ==
=== 2011 incompetence and registration plates scandal ===
Paul Bérenger described Bachoo as a "clown and incompetent who's a national shame" given the series of unpopular decisions imposed on motorists. After changing the legal requirements for fire extinguishers and speedometers, Bérenger described minister Bachoo's changes to registration plates as confusing and unnecessary.

=== 2013 multiple fatalities after floods due to roadworks in Port Louis ===
Soon after the 30-March-2013 floods in Port Louis which killed 11 people, protesters marched in front of the National Assembly to demand the resignation of Minister Anil Bachoo. Alain Bertrand, spokesperson of the Black Saturday Emergency Committee, deemed Bachoo to be incompetent as he failed to protect citizens as main drains were blocked and public works (for an extra lane from Caudan to Harbour Front) were so badly planned and executed that 11 people died as they became trapped during seasonal floods. Activist Salim Muthy also asked Minister Bachoo to resign in order to enable a fair investigation into this scandal. Salim Muthy also asked for the public disclosure of the wealth and assets accumulated by minister Bachoo, the head of the National Development Unit (NDU) and the head of the Road Development Authority. On 29 April 2013 a monument was erected at Rogers Square as a memorial for the 11 victims, but Anil Bachoo failed to attend the ceremony.

=== 2013 attacks on journalists ===
On 20 June 2013 when he was the No.4 of the government (Vice Prime Minister and Ministry of Public Infrastructure), Anil Bachoo spoke out to the public at Plaine Gersigny, Flacq against journalists who covered the Varmagate Labour Party scandal and he labelled them as "animals", "mentally ill" and as "having no School Certificate", and that all they know is "write a little bit of French". Journalist Dharmanand Dhooharika of Samedi Plus then lodged an official complaint to the police, asking for an independent inquiry into what he considered as a case of sedition or libel against all journalists.

=== 2013 NTC procurement scandal and road fatalities ===
Ashwin Dookun, president of the CNT, revealed in the press that Anil Bachoo could be exerting undue political interference on the Central Procurement Board (CPB) during the bidding process for new buses at the National Transport Corporation (NTC). As a result tenderer Iframac received an unfair advantage over competitors such as ABC Motors. Anerood Jugnauth also demanded Bachoo's resignation as his incompetence and lack of vision had resulted in the maladministration of NTC which was nearly bankrupt. Several fatal accidents (such as at Sorèze highway and the case of a door of an NTC bus which became loose were mentioned as examples of the poor fleet maintenance under Bachoo's watch.
