= Attorney-General of Mauritius =

Government ministry of Mauritius

The Attorney General's Office, Ministry of Justice, Human Rights and Institutional Reforms of Mauritius provides legal and legislative drafting services to the government of Mauritius. The Attorney General's Office interacts with the Legislature (National Assembly), Judiciary (Courts) and the Executive (Government/Ministries) branches, as well as provides assistance to the courts based on the powers vested in the office.

In most instances, the Attorney General simultaneously serves as the Minister of Justice (the titles mainly pronounced in articles and sources issued after 2010). The Attorney General, who should be a barrister, is the principal legal adviser to the government and holds the office of a minister. The Attorney General's Office is also responsible for the vetting of all contracts or agreements of which the government is a party, including international agreements, treaties or conventions.

== List of ministers (Mostly post-1968 upon achieving independence) ==
- Emmanuel Bussier (1975–1976)
- Rabindrah Ghurburrun (1976–1977)
- Paul Chong Leung (1978–1982)
- Shirin Aumeeruddy-Cziffra (1982–1983) [1st female]
- Abdool Kader Ahmed Bhayat (1983)
- Gaetan Duval (1984–1985)
- Anerood Jugnauth (1986–1987)
- Satcam Boolell (1988–1990)
- Jayen Cuttaree (1990–1991)
- Alan Ganoo (1992–1993)
- Anerood Jugnauth (1994–1995)
- Abdool Razack Ameen Peeroo (1996–2000)
- Emmanuel Leung Shing (2001–2005)
- Jayarama Valayden (2005–2009)
- Yatindra Nath Varma (2010–2013)
- Satya Faugoo (2013–2014)
- Ravi Yerrigadoo (2015–2017)
- Maneesh Gobin (2017–2024)
- Gavin Glover (Present)

== See also ==
- Justice ministry
- Politics of Mauritius
