= Les Verts Fraternels =

Political party in Mauritius

The Fraternal Greens Les Verts Fraternels
- Founded: 2002
- Ideology: Green politics
- Regional affiliation: Federation of Green Parties of Africa (Observer)
- International affiliation: Global Greens

The Fraternal Greens (French: Les Verts Fraternels) is a political party in Mauritius. The Fraternal Greens are also part of the Distinguished African Greens whose stated goals are to have a greener Africa, to mainstream green values in government policies, to monitor progress and commitments to the environment, to encourage sustainable natural resource management, and to promote unity and reconciliation among African People. In the legislative elections of 3 July 2005, the party was part of the Alliance Sociale, which won 42 out of 70 seats. Sylvio Michel is the current chairman.
