= Mauritian Party of Xavier-Luc Duval =

Mauritian political party

The Parti Mauricien Xavier-Luc Duval (PMXD) (English: Mauritian Party of Xavier-Luc Duval) was a Mauritian political party which was created in 1998 but was dissolved in 2009.

== History ==
Xavier-Luc Duval was the founder and leader of the party. He formed the PMXD soon after his expulsion from the Parti Mauricien Social Démocrate (PMSD) in September 1997. Senior figures of the PMSD (Hervé Duval Sr, Maurice Allet, Germain Comarmond, Clifford Empeigne, Mamade Khodabaccus and Vyolet Mootia) reprimanded Xavier-Luc Duval for repeated acts of indiscipline and for his open criticism of the PMSD's new alliance with its historical rival, the MMM.

== Electoral performance ==
At the legislative elections of 11 September 2000, the party was part of a coalition with the Mauritian Labour Party that won 36.6% of the vote and 8 out of 70 seats. In the 2005 elections, 3 July 2005, the party was part of the Alliance Sociale that won 42 out of 70 seats.
