= Satish Faugoo =

Mauritian politician

The Honorable Satish Faugoo सत्य फौगू MP
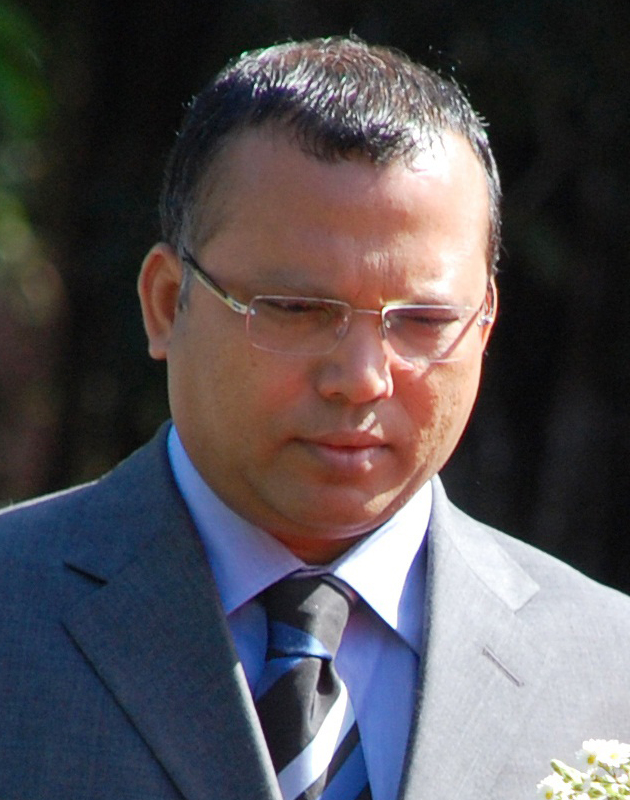
- Faugoo in 2010

Minister of Agro-Industry
- In office 13 September 2008 – 10 December 2014
- President: Sir Anerood Jugnauth
- Prime Minister: Navin Ramgoolam
- Preceded by: Arvin Boolell

Minister of Health
- In office 12 July 2005 – 13 September 2008
- President: Sir Anerood Jugnauth
- Prime Minister: Navin Ramgoolam
- Preceded by: Ashok Jugnauth
- Succeeded by: Rajesh Jeetah

Minister of Labour
- In office 16 November 1999 – 11 August 2000
- President: Cassam Uteem
- Prime Minister: Navin Ramgoolam
- Succeeded by: Showkutally Soodhun

Minister of Housing
- In office 23 September 1998 – 16 November 1999
- President: Cassam Uteem
- Prime Minister: Navin Ramgoolam
- Succeeded by: Mukeshwar Choonee

3rd Member of Parliament for Triolet & Pamplemousses
- In office 5 July 2005 – 10 December 2014
- President: Sir Anerood Jugnauth
- Prime Minister: Navin Ramgoolam
- Preceded by: Dev Hurnam

Personal details
- Born: 1 April 1961 (age 65) Bon Accueil, Mauritius
- Party: Mauritian Labour Party
- Occupation: Barrister

Satya Veyash Faugoo (born सत्य वेयश फौगू, 1 April 1961), more commonly known as Satish Faugoo, is a Mauritian politician.

== Life, Education and legal career ==
Faugoo was born into a Hindu Ravived (synonymous of caste Chamar) family. He was educated at Thames Valley University, London where he obtained his LLB and was called to the bar in 1987, belonging to the Lincoln's Inn of United Kingdom. He started practice in the same year in the State Law Office. He thus worked as barrister, Senior Magistrate in District Court and lastly was promoted to Magistrate of Intermediate Court.

- Called to the Bar of England & Wales (Lincoln’s inn), 1987
- Barrister at law
- State Law Officer
- Senior Magistrate – District Court
- Magistrate Intermediate Court

== Political career ==
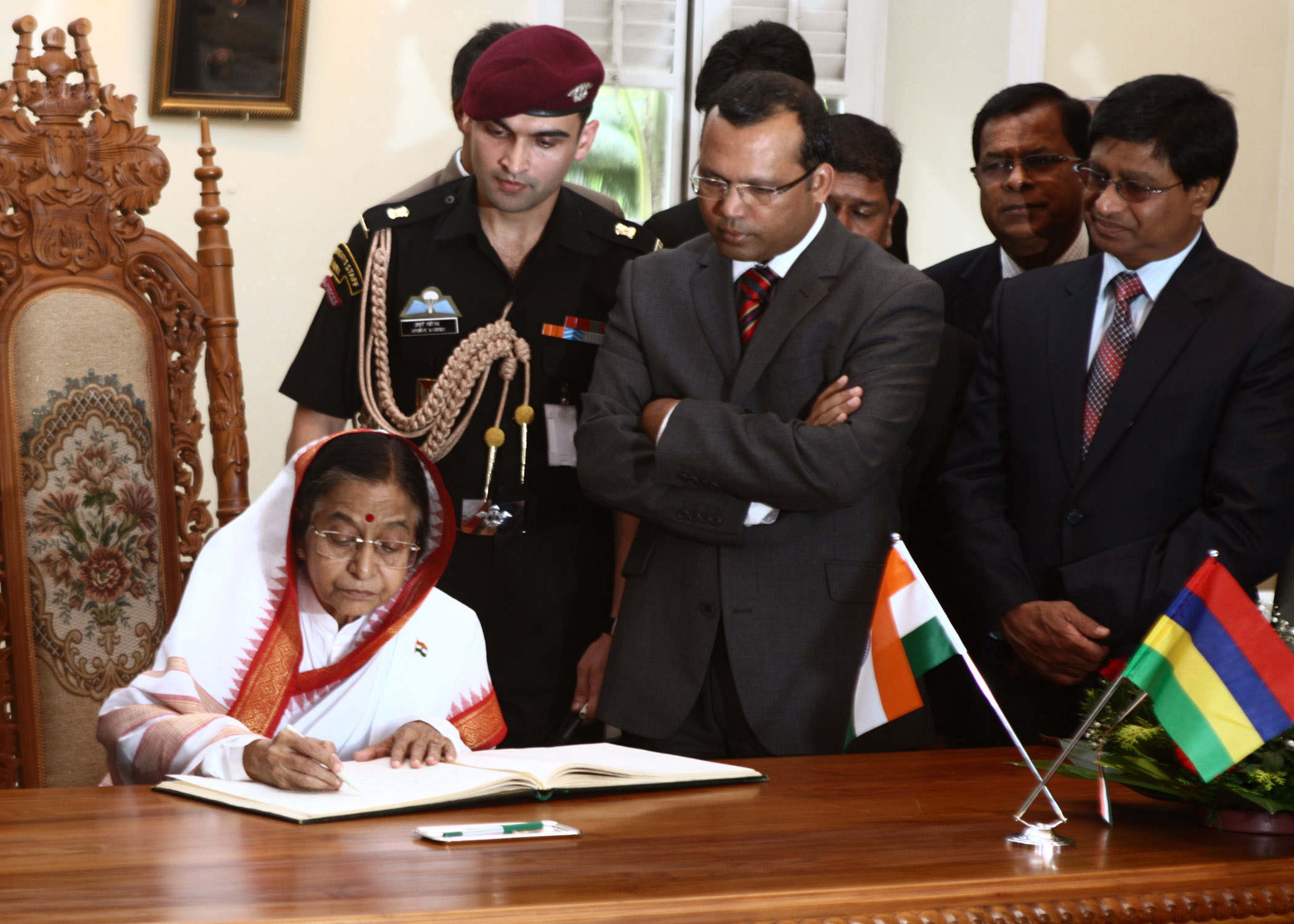
The President, Smt. Pratibha Devisingh Patil signing a visitor book, during her visit to Sir Seewoosagur Ramgoolam Botanic Garden, Mauritius on April 25, 2011. The Minister of Agro Industry & Food Security of Mauritius, Mr. Satya Veyash Faugoo is also seen.

Faugoo is a former Minister of Agro-Industry of Mauritius, serving in the cabinet of Navin Ramgoolam until December 2014. From 2005 to 2014, he was the 3rd Member of Parliament representing Constituency No 5,Triolet & Pamplemousses. He was elected for the first time in 1998, Constituency No 9, Bon Acceuil & Flaq as he defeated Anerood Jugnauth. He became MP and was appointed as Minister of Housing & Lands. In 1999, he was appointed as Minister of Labour.

In 2000 Faugoo was not elected following his defeat by the MSM/MMM coalition. In 2005, he was elected 2nd Member in Constituency No 5 and was appointed as Minister of Health. When the cabinet was reshuffled in 2008 Faugoo was appointed as the Minister of Agro-Industry.

In early 2023 Faugoo faced disciplinary action within the Labour Party after raising concerns about Navin Ramgoolam's one man show, poor leadership, and the party's dysfunctional structure.

- Member of the Labour Party
- Elected 2nd Member of Constituency No 9 on 5 April 1998
- Member of Parliament from April 1998 to Aug 2000
- Minister of Housing and Lands (1998-1999)
- Minister of Labour and Industrial Relations, Employment &
- Human Resources (Nov 1999 - Aug 2000)
- Re-elected 2nd Member of Constituency No 5 on 4 July 2005
- Member of Parliament as from 12 July 2005 to September 2008
- Minister of Health and Quality of Life - July 2005 to 12
- September 2008
- Minister of Agro Industry, Food Production and Security -
- 13 September 2008 to 4 May 2010
- Re-elected 3rd Member of Constituency No. 5 on 6 May 2010
- Member of Parliament as from 18 May 2010 to 6 October 2014
- Minister of Agro Industry and Food Security - As from 18 May 2010 to 18 June 2013
- Minister of Agro Industry and Food Security, Attorney General - as from 18 June 2013 to 28 November 2014
- Minister of Agro Industry and Food Security - as from 18 June 2013 to December 2014
