= Madan Dulloo =

Mauritian politician

The Honourable Madan Dulloo मदन डलूओ
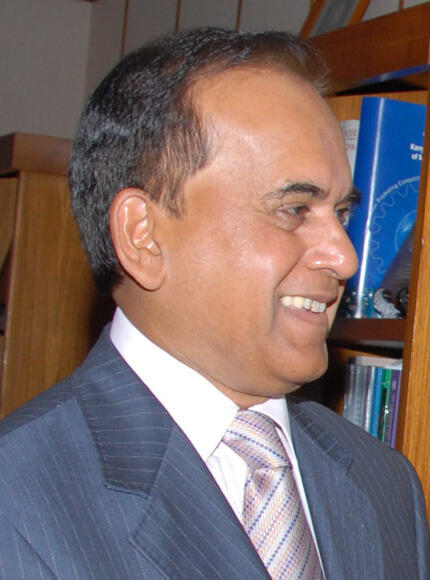

Former Member of parliament

Personal details
- Born: 20 September 1949 (age 77)
- Education: University of London
- Occupation: Politician, Barrister and Diplomat

Madan Murlidhar Dulloo (born 20 September 1949), is a barrister, politician and diplomat from Mauritius.

A law graduate from the University of London, member of the Middle Temple, Madan Dulloo was first elected during the 1976 general elections under the banner of the Mauritian Militant Movement.

Madan Dulloo is one of the longest serving Member of Parliament (29 years). Madan Dulloo has been present in constituency No.6 (Grand Baie/Poudre D’Or) since 1976 (34 years); Elected Member of Parliament for constituency No.6 (Grand Baie/Poudre D’Or) at the following General Elections: 1976, 1982, 1983, 1987, 1991, 2000, 2005.

In 2005, Madan Dulloo was at his tenth (10th) elections. He has always been a candidate for the General Elections in constituency No.6 Grand-Baie/Poudre D’or since 1976.

Madan Dulloo has held the following ministerial portfolios throughout his political career:

- Minister of Foreign Affairs and Emigration
- Minister of Agriculture, Fisheries, and Natural Resources
- Attorney General and Minister of Justice
- Minister of Foreign Affairs, International Trade and Cooperation

Between 1986 and 1994, Madan Dulloo was Minister of Foreign Affairs and Emigration, Minister of Agriculture, Fisheries & Natural Resources and Attorney General & Minister of Justice.

Between 2005 and 2008, Madan Dulloo was Minister of Foreign Affairs, International Trade and Cooperation.
