= Republican Movement (Mauritius) =

Political party in Mauritius

- Founded: 1990s
- Ideology: Socialism
- National affiliation: Alliance Sociale

Website
- mr.nicmu.com (archived)

The Republican Movement (French: Mouvement Républicain) was a political party in Mauritius.

== History ==
The Mouvement Républicain (MR) party was founded by barrister and politician Rama Valayden on 23 August 1996 after he had distanced himself from the Parti Mauricien Social Démocrate (PMSD). Soon after MR made headlines for protesting against the extensive deforestation on the island of Mauritius and demanded swift action from the government to prevent a worsening of the crisis. Subsequently, by October 2009 the main elements of MR had merged with the PMSD.

== Electoral success ==
At the legislative elections of 11 September 2000, the party was part of a coalition of the Militant Socialist Movement and the Mauritian Militant Movement, that won 51.7% and 58 out of 70 seats. In the 2005 elections, 3 July 2005, the party was part of the Alliance Sociale, that won 42 out of 70 seats.
