= Emmanuel Leung Shing =

Emmanuel Jean Leung Shing is a Mauritian lawyer.

Emmanuel Leung Shing's parents, Pierre Wong Sen Leung Shing (1916–2004) and Madeleine Rose Leung Shing (1921–2014), married in 1943. Emmanuel is the eldest of five siblings, including Georges, Thérèse, Noël, and Louis Pierre. His father was appointed to Taiwan's Control Yuan in 1987, as a representative of Overseas Chinese in Africa. Moilin Jean Ah-Chuen was Emmanuel Leung Shing's uncle.

Emmanuel Leung Shing led the Ministry of Justice from 2001 to 2005.
