= Lormus Bundhoo =

Mauritian politician

Lormus Bundhoo is a Mauritian politician. On February 23, 2011 he was elected general secretary of the Labour Party.

He was elected to parliament in 1995, 2005 and 2010. He served as junior minister in the Prime Minister's Office between 1998 and 2000, and as Minister of Environment between September 2008 and May 2010.
