= Elections in Mauritius =

Elections in Mauritius are held for government offices at the national and local levels. Mauritians and other eligible Commonwealth of Nations citizens directly elect 62 members of the National Assembly at the national level. Up to eight unsuccessful parliamentary election candidates may be appointed to legislature through the Best Loser System (BLS), to ensure all four communities classified by the electoral commission are not underrepresented. At the local level, Mauritians residing in urban municipalities vote for municipal councillors; those residing elsewhere on the mainland elect village councillors; and individuals residing in the autonomous region of Rodrigues elect the island's Assembly members. Indirect elections are held for the president, vice president, district councillors and municipal and village mayors.

Mauritius has held elections since 1886, however, until the suffrage was significantly expanded in 1948, voting was limited to propertied classes. Universal suffrage was not introduced until 1959, removing literacy requirements. The country has held free and fair elections since independence in 1968, although the plurality block electoral system has faced scrutiny for producing disproportionate election results. BLS has also been subject to criticism, in part for appointing members of parliament based on an outdated population census. While most parties now support electoral reform, they have been unable to agree on a replacement.

== Voting ==
Mauritius holds elections at the national and local levels. At the national level, Mauritians elect 62 members of the National Assembly, the unicameral chamber of parliament. At the local level, Mauritians residing in urban areas elect municipal councillors, while citizens in rural areas elect members of the village councils. Residents of the autonomous region of Rodrigues select members of the local legislature. The country holds indirect elections for the ceremonial posts of president and vice president, as well as for mayors and district councillors. All direct elections, except for the Rodrigues Assembly, are conducted using the plurality block voting system.

=== Parliamentary elections ===
Current boundaries of the National Assembly constituencies

Mauritians elect 62 members of the National Assembly, who are selected from 21 multi-member constituencies. All electorates have three representatives, except for Rodrigues, which has two. Candidates for the National Assembly are required to be at least 18 years old, citizens of the Commonwealth of Nations, reside in the constituency they contest for at least two years, and be proficient enough in English to participate in parliamentary proceedings. Contestants also require a nomination from at least six electors in their constituency and a deposit to be paid, which is refunded if they receive no less than 10% of the vote. Unless the prime minister advises the president to dissolve the National Assembly early, members serve a five-year term. Casual vacancies for the directly elected seats are filled through by-elections.

==== Best Loser System ====
The electoral commission divides the electorate into four communities for parliamentary elections: Hindus, Muslims, Sino-Mauritians, and the general population. The latter comprises individuals who do not belong to the first three, including Mauritian Creoles and Franco-Mauritians. The country employs the Best Loser System (BLS) to ensure that the four communities are allocated representation that corresponds to their population percentages. Should a community's representation fall below its population proportion after a parliamentary election, the electoral supervisory commission can appoint up to eight unsuccessful candidates from these communities to parliament. Appointees to the first four seats are chosen regardless of affiliation. The other four are allocated to the party that receives the most votes nationwide, to prevent the system from changing an election outcome. Since 2014, it has been optional for candidates to declare which community they belong to. Contestants who refuse to affiliate with a community are ineligible for a Best Loser nomination. BLS members who vacate their seats during a parliamentary term are replaced by the next-highest polling unsuccessful candidate from their community. The BLS calculation is based on outdated figures from the 1972 population census, the last to require respondents to state their ethnic affiliation, drawing widespread scrutiny, including from the Supreme Court and the United Nations Human Rights Committee.

=== Presidential elections ===
Since Mauritius became a republic in 1992, the nation has held indirect elections for the presidency and vice-presidency. Both offices are elected separately by members of the National Assembly, with each officeholder serving a five-year term. Candidates for these posts must secure a majority of votes from legislators to be elected. The president is subject to a limit of two terms, while the vice-president is eligible to seek re-election indefinitely. Eligible candidates for both posts must be Mauritian citizens, at least 40 years old and have resided in the country for at least five years before the election.

=== Local elections ===
Mauritians residing in the five urban municipalities elect members of the municipal councils. Voters in other parts of the country, except Rodrigues, elect members of their respective village councils. Since 2012, groups and alliances fielding more than two candidates in a municipality or village have been required to ensure that two-thirds of their contestant lineup were not of the same gender. If a group does not comply with the gender quota, its candidates, while still allowed to contest the elections, can only run as independents. All local election dates are determined by the president on the advice of the prime minister. Both village and municipal councillors serve a six-year term, unless the president calls snap elections or approves the extension of the council terms.

==== Municipalities ====
Since 2015, there have been a combined total of 120 councillors across the five municipalities. The council in the capital, Port Louis, has 32 members, while two municipalities have 24 members: Beau Bassin-Rose Hill and Vacoas-Phoenix. The Curepipe and Quatre Bornes municipalities, on the other hand, both have 20 members. All council wards return four members. Eligible candidates must be at least 18 years old and residents of the municipality in which they contest. Councillors indirectly elect the municipal mayors and deputy mayors.

==== Villages ====
Mauritius has 130 village councils, each with nine members. There are a total of 1,170 village councillors nationwide. The number of voters varies between the villages, despite all having the same number of council seats. As of 2020, Triolet, the village with the largest electorate, had 18,399 registered voters, while Chamarel had the fewest with only 574 electors. Unlike for the National Assembly and municipal councils, political parties rarely contest village council elections. With many fluid alliances on the councils, numerous ad hoc groups participate in place of parties. Village councillors indirectly elect a chairperson every two years.

==== Districts ====
Members of the seven district councils are indirectly elected by village councils located within their respective districts. District council elections occur within one week of the village council polls. Depending on its electorate size, village councils elect one or two district councillors. Eligible candidates are required to be proficient enough in English and French to participate in council proceedings. Each district council indirectly elects a chairperson every two years.

=== Rodrigues Regional Assembly ===
Rodrigues was granted autonomy in 2001 and held its first regional assembly elections the following year. Elections to the assembly are conducted via the mixed-member proportional electoral system. Since 2017, the assembly has had 17 members; 12 are elected from six two-seat constituencies, known as local regions, through the plurality-bloc system. Five members are elected from an island-wide constituency through proportional representation from the lists of parties that reach the 10% threshold. These seats are allocated to parties based on their share of candidates elected from the local regions. Rodriguan electors are thus allocated three votes. Parties that do not field contestants in local regions are ineligible for an island-wide seat. Eligible candidates must be Mauritian citizens, have resided in Rodrigues for at least six months before the nomination date, and be proficient enough in English and French to participate in assembly proceedings. The president of the republic sets the dates for the regional assembly election, and representatives serve five-year terms. Assembly members indirectly elect a chief commissioner, Rodrigues' executive, from among themselves every five years.

=== Eligibility ===
Universal suffrage was granted in 1959, permitting all Mauritians to vote regardless of ethnicity or class. Eligible voters are required to be citizens of the Commonwealth, at least 18 years old and have resided in Mauritius for a least two years. Public servants enrolled in constituencies in Rodrigues or Agaléga but stationed in Mauritius or vice versa can apply to vote by proxy. Voting is not compulsory.

== History ==
=== Colonial period ===
The first elections held in Mauritius were in 1886 for the Legislative Council under British colonial rule. The polls were organised to cater to the demands of the Franco-Mauritian minority for political representation in the colony. Suffrage was limited to men who possessed ₨300 of immovable property or movable property worth ₨3,000, a monthly salary of ₨50, those paying rent of ₨25 a month or paying a licence duty of at least ₨200 a year. People married to eligible voters, or the oldest son of a qualifying widow, were also entitled to cast a ballot. As such, only around one per cent of the population was eligible to vote, which included most Franco-Mauritians, while less than one per cent of the majority Indo-Mauritian community, mostly business owners, were enfranchised. Although voting remained restricted to propertied classes in the following decades, limited representation on the council was later extended to Creoles, Hindus and Muslims. Voting was extended in 1948 to all individuals who could pass a basic literacy test in any language spoken in Mauritius. Universal suffrage took effect in 1959, removing the literacy requirement.

The British colonial administration held two commissions to determine an electoral system for an independent Mauritius. The first, which occurred in 1958, proposed establishing 40 single-member constituencies using the first-past-the-post voting system. This recommendation was supported by then Chief Minister Seewoosagur Ramgoolam's Labour Party, which primarily had supporters from the Hindu majority by that time. The Labour Party argued that proportional representation (PR) would result in the establishment of ethnically centred parties and increase communal tensions, and also claimed that PR was too complex for the predominantly illiterate population to understand. On the other hand, Parti Mauricien and other parties comprising minority communities believed that PR would foster inter-communal harmony and guarantee minority representation. A constitutional conference in 1965 replaced the single-member constituencies with 20 multi-member ones to prevent a disproportionate representation of Hindu lawmakers. The 1966 commission upheld the changes, with the aim of incentivising parties to appeal to multiple communities. An additional constituency was added for Rodrigues. The electoral boundaries were drawn in proportion to each community's population percentage. As such, 13 constituencies had a majority Hindu electorate; six had voters primarily from the general population, while Muslims formed a majority in only one constituency. These boundaries have been in place ever since.

=== Post-independence (since 1968) ===
Since independence in 1968, Mauritius has held free and fair elections. All parliamentary polls have seen numerous parties secure representation. Electoral alliances between parties have been widely viewed as a crucial feature of securing victory in post-independence parliamentary elections. As such, governments formed since independence have been coalitions, all of which have been established before elections, except in 1976, when an alliance was not determined until after the poll. In part due to the constituency boundaries, a Hindu-dominant party has always won the most seats, aside from in the 1982 election. These parties, however, have frequently relied on smaller non-Hindu parties to secure a majority.

Due to the electoral system, the seat share of parties and alliances has often been disproportionate to the number of votes received. The 1982, 1995, and 2024 parliamentary elections saw an opposition alliance defeat a governing coalition and win all mainland seats. The resulting absence of an opposition presence in the aftermath has sparked concerns of a lack of checks and balances on the successive governments. In the 2019 parliamentary election, the governing Alliance Morisien won re-election, securing 63% of the seats, despite receiving only 37% of the popular vote.

While electoral reform has widespread support, most parties have different preferences on a system to replace the status quo and have been unable to reach a consensus. Since 2002, there have numerous efforts to change the electoral system. In 2014, the Labour-led government of Prime Minister Navin Ramgoolam proposed changes to the electoral system at the national level. The government sought to address disproportionalities resulting from the plurality system in parliamentary elections by replacing BLS with 16 additional proportional list tier members. These seats would be allocated based on the votes received by unsuccessful candidates, while the plurality bloc seats would remain. This proposal was effectively a compromise between the parallel system, which the then opposition Militant Socialist Movement (MSM) supported, and the compensatory method, which the Mauritian Militant Movement (MMM) preferred. The Labour government also sought to transfer executive power to the president and introduce direct elections for the post. During the 2014 snap election, the MSM-led Alliance Lepep, which opposed the reforms, defeated the Labour-MMM coalition in an upset, resulting in the proposal's demise. The Alliance Lepep government sought to introduce a mixed-member proportional system, however, it was voted down by parliament in 2018. Labour and the MMM returned to government in 2024 under Alliance du Changement, and again proposed reforms to the electoral system.

== See also ==
- Politics of Mauritius
- Electoral calendar
- Electoral system
