= Ashok Jugnauth =

Mauritian politician

Ashock Jugnauth आशोक जग्नोथ

Minister of Civil Service
- In office 15 June 1993 – 20 December 1995
- Prime Minister: Anerood Jugnauth

Minister of Health of Mauritius
- In office 7 Sept 2000 – 5 July 2005
- President: Sir Anerood Jugnauth
- Prime Minister: Paul Berenger
- Succeeded by: Rajesh Jeeta

1st Member of Parliament for Moka & Quartier Militaire
- In office 16 September 2000 – 6 May 2009
- Prime Minister: Sir Anerood Jugnauth; Paul Berenger
- Preceded by: Paul Bérenger

Personal details
- Born: 3 January 1951 (age 75) Vacoas, Mauritius
- Party: Militant Socialist Movement, UN
- Spouse: Mrs Ashok Jugnauth
- Occupation: Barrister

Ashock Kumar Jugnauth, also known as Ashok Jugnauth (born 3 January 1951) is a Mauritian politician and former Member of Parliament.

== Early life and career ==
Jugnauth was born at Palma, Quatre Bornes. He is the younger half-brother of Sir Anerood Jugnauth. He studied law and practised as a barrister in Mauritius.

== Political career ==
Ashock became an active member of the Militant Socialist Movement (MSM) and in 1991 he was elected for the first time to the Legislative Assembly as an MSM-MMM politician. He became Minister of Civil Service in 1993. At the 1995 National Assembly elections he was not elected. Ashock was appointed as Minister of Health by Prime Minister Sir Anerood Jugnauth in 2000 following the victory of the MSM-MMM coalition at the 11 September 2000 Elections. Ashock was the Minister of Health of Mauritius from 2000 to 2005. He served in the cabinet of Anerood Jugnauth from 2000 to 2003 and that of Paul Berenger from 2003 to 2005 as Anerood became President of Mauritius.

Following the July 2005 elections he became member of the Opposition (MSM-MMM coalition) after being elected at Constituency No.8 Quartier Militaire-Moka. By 2006 Ashock Jugnauth became the founder of a splinter group which left MSM to form new political party Union National (UN) after newly appointed MSM leader Pravind Jugnauth's decision to end its alliance with the MMM whilst both parties remained in Opposition.

Following the 2008 Court Ruling and successful contestation by defeated rival Raj Ringadoo of Ashock's election 3 years earlier by-elections had to be held in Constituency No.8. At the 2009 by-elections Ashock Jugnauth stood under the banner of his new party Union National which had the support of Berenger's MMM. However his rival Pravind Jugnauth won the seat.

At the May 2010 elections he was a candidate of the Alliance MMM-UN-MMSD coalition in Constituency No.8 but was defeated by his rival and nephew Pravind Jugnauth. At the December 2014 elections Ashock Jugnauth was candidate of Labour-MMM (PTR-MMM) at Constituency No.8 but was again defeated by his nephew Pravind. Ashock Jugnauth was once again defeated at Constituency No.8 at the November 2019 elections as a candidate of the Labour-PMSD (PTr-PMSD) alliance.

== Controversies ==
Soon after the re-election of Ashock Jugnauth at the 2005 General Elections as member of the Opposition his rival Raj Ringadoo lodged legal action in court, accusing Jugnauth of electoral bribery in the form of a promised new Muslim cemetery and by promising jobs to 101 health care assistants from his Constituency in exchange for votes in his favour. In April 2007 the Supreme Court found Ashock Jugnauth to be guilty. He appealed the verdict to the British Privy Council. But in November 2008 the Jucial Committee of the British Privy Council upheld the guilty verdict. As a result, Ashock Jugnauth lost his seat in parliament and by-election had to be held in 2009.
