= Rajesh Jeetah =

Mauritius government minister

Rajeshwar Jeetah (born 5 July 1962), and more commonly known as Rajesh Jeetah, is a Mauritian politician.

== Political career ==
Rajesh Jeetah's political career started in December 2003 when he was elected in Constituency No. 7 Piton and Rivière du Rempart during by-elections, defeating rivals Ramprakash Maunthrooa (Alliance MSM-MMM) and Jayeshwur Raj Dayal of Mouvement Démocratique National Raj Dayal (MDN Raj Dayal). These by-elections were triggered by the resignation of Anerood Jugnauth who took up the position of President of Mauritius.

At the 2005 general elections Rajesh Jeetah was elected to the National Assembly in Constituency No. 11 Vieux Grand Port and Rose Belle as a candidate of Alliance Sociale.

He was elected again at the 2010 general elections as a candidate of Alliance PTR-PMSD-MSM in Constituency No. 10 Montagne Blanche and Grand River South East. Jeetah served as Minister of Tertiary Education, Science, Research and Technology of Mauritius.

Due to numerous scandals which made news headlines, Jeetah did not receive the investiture of any party at the 2014 general elections. At the 2019 general elections Jeetah was a candidate of L'Alliance Nationale in Constituency No. 11 but was not elected as all 3 seats in that constituency were won by candidates of L'Alliance Morisien.

Following the November 2024 General Elections, Jeetah was nominated by the Labour Party-MMM government as High Commissioner of Mauritius in London.

== Scandals ==
=== Fraud campus and Université Marron ===
Rajesh Jeetah's brother Sunil has owned the campus of Eastern Institute for Integrated Learning in Management (EIILM) in Mauritius since 2007. Although hundreds of private fee-paying students graduated from the Mauritian campus of EIILM, the University Grants Commission of India does not recognize Indian universities that are located outside Indian territory. Furthermore, as the Tertiary Education Commission (TEC) of Mauritius withdrew its support for this campus in December 2015, these graduates' qualifications are not recognised. Other similar institutions include D. Y. Patil Medical College (DDPMC). Rajesh Jeetah defended his brother's institution in Parliament. Dharam Gokhool criticized Jeetah's attempts to blame him for allowing some of the troubled organisations to start operations when Gokhool held the ministerial portfolio.

R. Rughooputh, the former vice-chancellor of the University of Mauritius (UoM), revealed that his contract had been unduly terminated after he refused to support Minister Jeetah's ambition to grow the number of foreign universities based in Mauritius. In 2014, Jeetah even promoted the Ugandan branch of the Open University of Mauritius, which he claimed would be quality assured by British education authorities. The scandal became known locally as "Université Marron" (or Fraud Campus).

=== Forced resignation of Vice Chancellor Pr Konrad Morgan ===
In 2012 the Vice Chancellor of the University of Mauritius, Pr Konrad Morgan, was forced to resign following Minister Jeetah's undue interference with university matters. The president of the University of Mauritius Academic and Staff Union (UMASA) Dinesh Hurreeram also reported that the Vice Chancellor was being overpowered by the Registrar, thus making the university dysfunctional.

=== Bel Air Medical School confrontation ===
A major conflict of interest arose soon after Jeetah's election in 2010 in Constituency No.10 (Montagne Blanche and Grand River South East) as he started to promote the idea of starting up a medical school in Bel-Air which also happens to be located within the same Constituency. Rajesh Jeetah wanted the staff of the University of Mauritius to bypass procedures and skip steps in order to allow the Swiss-based medical faculty to start dispensing courses within a short period. When the UoM staff refused to comply with Minister Jeetah's orders, he accused them of being unprofessional, although their refusal was based on the lack of basic amenities in Bel Air, and preferred an alternative location in Pamplemousses which was closer to an existing hospital.

=== Betamax jackpot of Rs 10 Billion ===
The Betamax Saga exposed serious malpractice in the allocation by the Stade Trading Corporation (STC) of a 15-year contract worth Rs 10 Billion without any tender to Rajesh Jeetah's brother-in-law Veekram Bhunjun's firm Betamax for the supply of fuel from India in 2009. As a member of Navin Ramgoolam's L'Alliance Sociale cabinet, Jeetah failed to disclose his conflict of interest when he participated in the ministerial committee which awarded the contract to Bhunjun's Betamax. This also involved bypassing the procurement procedure and amending the Public Procurement Act to allow STC to award the contract to Betamax without seeking prior approval of the Central Procurement Board (CPB). This contravened the advice of the Solicitor General Office and caused substantial monetary loss to the Republic of Mauritius. Furthermore Bhunjun had no prior experience in shipping petroleum products, as Betamax was hastily formed as a joint venture between Bhunjun's concrete-mixing company Betonix and a Singaporean firm. The contract guaranteed a progressive increase of Betamax's cut, regardless of changes in the market price of oil, whilst STC still had to pay for costs such as fees and charges associated with port delay, demurrage and others. Accounting form BDO even came up with a report claiming that Betamax's deal was cheaper than what freight companies Pratibha and ST Shipping had been charging the STC.

== Controversies ==
=== Collision with wild deer in Phoenix ===
A woman residing in Vacoas lodged a statement at the Sodnac police station on 18 October 2011 to report that she witnessed Rajesh Jeetah's silver Mercedes Benz colliding with a wild deer near Phoenix round about. Jeetah's policeman-bodyguard reported that he was surprised when the animal appeared in front of the car. An investigation was initiated to determine why the deer was present at that location as it appeared that it was hiding near the hill of Candos.
