= Alliance Sociale =

Political coalition in Mauritius

Social Alliance Alliance Sociale
- Founder: Navin Ramgoolam
- Founded: 2000
- Dissolved: 2009
- Ideology: Social democracy
- Political position: Centre-left
- Colours: Red; Blue; Yellow; Green
- Slogan: Une Île Maurice pour tous (English: "A Mauritius for all")

Website
- alliance-sociale.biz (archived)

Alliance Sociale was a left-wing political coalition of 5 parties in Mauritius. It consisted of the Mauritian Labour Party, Mauritian Party of Xavier-Luc Duval, The Greens, Republican Movement and the Mauritian Militant Socialist Movement.

The Alliance won 38 of the 70 parliamentary seats in the general election of July 2005, and formed the government with Navin Ramgoolam as Prime Minister. Ramgoolam had previously held the office from 1995 to 2000.

== Participating parties ==
| Party | | 2005 |
|---|---|---|
| PTr | Labour Party | Yes |
| PMXD | Parti Mauricien Xavier-Luc Duval | Yes |
| MSD | Mouvement Socialiste Démocrate | Yes |
| MMSM | Mauritian Militant Socialist Movement | Yes |
| VF | Les Verts Fraternels | Yes |
| MR | Republican Movement | Yes |

== Election results ==
=== Legislative elections ===
| Election | Leader | Votes | % | Seats | +/– | Position | Status |
|---|---|---|---|---|---|---|---|
| 2005 | Navin Ramgoolam | 948,756 | 48.38 | 42 / 70 | ▲33 | ▲1st | Coalition |

== See also ==
1. List of prime ministers of Mauritius
