= Mauritius–United Kingdom relations =

Bilateral relations

- Mauritius: United Kingdom

Diplomatic mission
- High Commission of Mauritius, London: British High Commission, Port Louis

Envoy
- High Commissioner Rajeshwar Jeetah: High Commissioner Paul Brummell

Mauritius–United Kingdom relations are the bilateral relations between the Republic of Mauritius and the United Kingdom of Great Britain and Northern Ireland. Britain captured the French colony of Île de France in 1810, and the capitulation provided that "The inhabitants shall preserve their Religion, Laws and Customs"; by the Treaty of Paris France ceded the colony, renamed Mauritius, to the United Kingdom, which ruled it until independence on 12 March 1968. Both countries are members of the Commonwealth, which Mauritius remained in after becoming a republic in 1992, and they maintain high commissions in each other's capitals. The two governments have described themselves as "close Commonwealth partners" with a "strong and historic relationship", and in 2025 they set up a Strategic Partnership Framework, saying that their countries "enjoy deep historical ties".

British rule left Mauritius with a parliamentary constitution that the Judicial Committee of the Privy Council has described as being "on the familiar Westminster-style model", and with a mixed legal system in which French-derived codes govern much of private law while procedure, evidence and specialist areas such as shipping, finance and banking law derive from England. The Judicial Committee in London remains Mauritius's final court of appeal, and Mauritius is one of the two largest sources of its cases; it has ruled against the Mauritian state or its agencies in several appeals, including the Betamax arbitration case of 2021. English is the official language of the National Assembly, most new barristers qualify by being called to the bar in the United Kingdom, and secondary pupils sit the School Certificate and Higher School Certificate in collaboration with Cambridge. Vehicles drive on the left, and several Premier League clubs have official supporters' clubs on the island.

At the 2021 census 38,862 people born in Mauritius lived in England and Wales, and the Chagossians who moved to Britain after 2002 live mainly in Crawley; Mauritius's 2022 census counted 482 resident British nationals. The United Kingdom has been Mauritius's second-largest source of tourists after France since 2017, apart from 2020; 154,990 British visitors arrived in 2025. Trade in goods and services totalled £2.0 billion in the year to March 2026, and since 2021 has been governed by the Eastern and Southern Africa–UK Economic Partnership Agreement; a double taxation convention has been in force since 1981, and Mauritius's international financial centre serves as a platform for investment into Africa. The two countries cooperate on maritime security, the environment and health; the United Kingdom sent experts after the Wakashio oil spill in 2020 and donated 211,200 doses of COVID-19 vaccine for children in 2022.

The main source of tension has been the sovereignty of the Chagos Archipelago, which the United Kingdom detached from Mauritius in 1965, before independence. On 24 June 2016 the British High Commission and the United States Embassy in Port Louis warned that referring the dispute to the International Court of Justice "would cause lasting damage to Mauritius' bilateral relations with both the UK and the USA"; the Mauritian Prime Minister's Office called the warning "hostile and totally unacceptable". Mauritius obtained an advisory opinion in 2019, and on 22 May 2025 the two governments signed a treaty under which the United Kingdom would recognise Mauritian sovereignty over the archipelago; it had not entered into force by November 2026.

== History ==
=== British Mauritius (1810–1968) ===
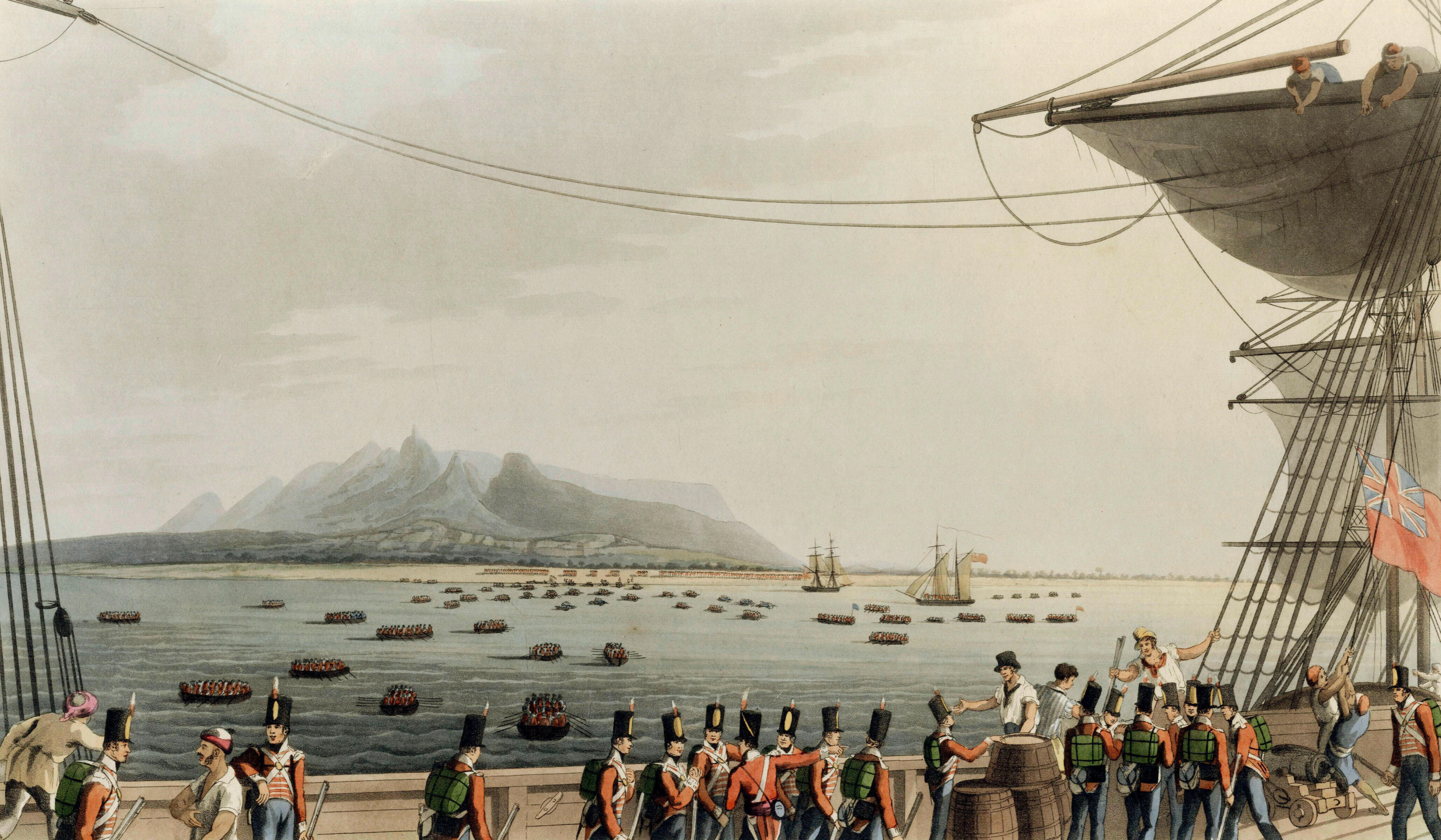
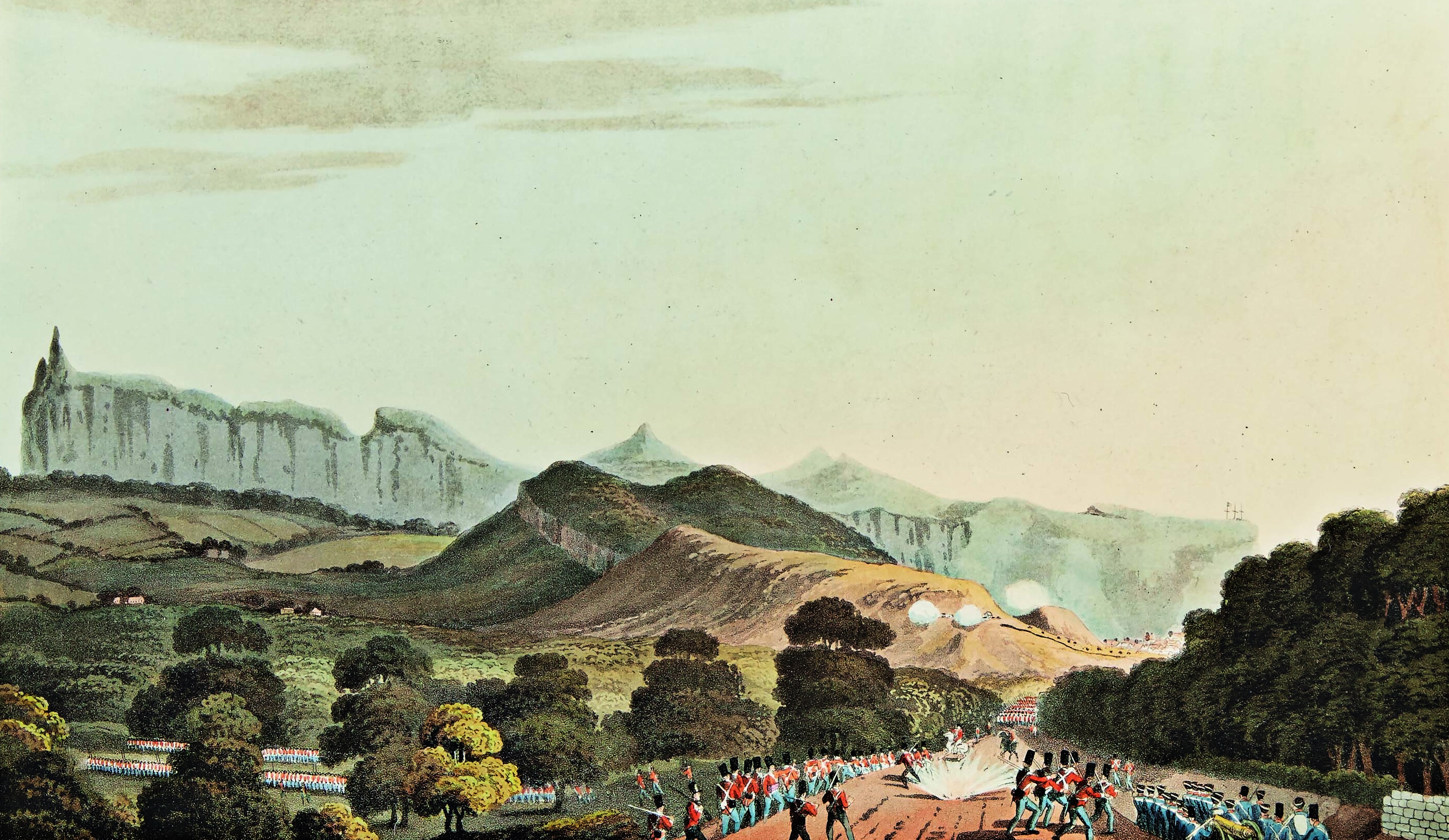
The British army landing on Île de France (left) and part of the army forming before Port Louis (right): two of the Eight Views of the Mauritius, aquatints by John Heaviside Clark after Richard Temple, published in 1813, which show the army's positions from 29 November to 1 December 1810 during the British invasion

A British force of some 10,000 men, carried from India by a fleet of seventy ships, landed on Île de France in 1810, during the Napoleonic Wars, and the French capitulated. The capitulation, signed on 3 December 1810, covered the colony's dependencies and provided that "The inhabitants shall preserve their Religion, Laws and Customs", and by the Treaty of Paris of 30 May 1814 France ceded the colony, renamed Mauritius, and its dependencies to the United Kingdom. The British left the existing legal and administrative structures in place; English became the official language, but French and Creole remained dominant, and few British settlers came to the colony.

Slavery was abolished in 1835. By the mid-nineteenth century Mauritius was Britain's main sugar-producing colony. In 1834 the British government chose it as the first site of what it called "the great experiment", the use of indentured rather than enslaved labour, and between 1834 and 1920 almost half a million indentured labourers arrived from India through the immigration depot in Port Louis, the Aapravasi Ghat, now a World Heritage Site.

From 1831 the governor was assisted by a Council of Government, at first composed of officials and members he nominated, to which elected members were gradually added. Under the constitution of 1886 Governor John Pope Hennessy added ten elected members, chosen on a franchise limited to property owners who made up some 2 per cent of the adult population. The 1947 constitution replaced the council with a Legislative Council of 19 elected members, 12 members nominated by the governor and 3 officials, and a separate Executive Council, and extended the vote to adults able to write their names in any of the island's languages. The 1958 constitution gave the vote to all adults over 21 and created 40 single-member constituencies, first used at the election of 9 March 1959. The post of Chief Minister was created in 1961 and taken by Seewoosagur Ramgoolam in 1962; after the 1963 election he led an all-party coalition and, under the 1964 constitution, became Premier with a Council of Ministers.

At the constitutional conference held at Lancaster House in September 1965, the British government decided that Mauritius should become independent after a general election under a new electoral system. The conference also agreed that a defence agreement would be negotiated before independence and that Mauritius would remain eligible for British economic assistance and continue to benefit from the Commonwealth Sugar Agreement. During the conference the Mauritian ministers agreed to the detachment of the Chagos Archipelago, the origin of the later sovereignty dispute (see below).

=== Independence and after ===
Mauritius became independent on 12 March 1968 as a member of the Commonwealth, and was admitted to the United Nations on 24 April. It kept the British monarch as head of state: moving the second reading of the independence bill in the House of Lords, the Minister of State for Commonwealth Affairs, Lord Shepherd, said that Mauritius "will not be breaking her connection with the Crown, for she has decided to remain a Monarchy". He told the House: "We have had a close relationship with Mauritius since 1810 and I do not believe that independence will in any way cut this long-standing tie." Mauritius became a republic in March 1992 and remained in the Commonwealth.

Personal flag of Elizabeth II as Queen of Mauritius, 1972–1992

On independence day the two governments signed an Agreement on Mutual Defence and Assistance. They undertook to consult on the measures to be taken if either faced an armed attack or threat, and to consult on any Mauritian request for help with internal security; Mauritius granted the United Kingdom "the right in peace and war to station armed forces and associated civilian personnel in Mauritius and to use facilities there". The agreement preserved British use of the naval communications centre, HMS Mauritius, and of Plaisance airfield, and British personnel were seconded to the Special Mobile Force of the Mauritius Police; it was concluded for six years, after which either government could end it on a year's notice. British troops had already been called in to end communal violence in Port Louis six weeks before independence. The British military presence ended after the 1974–1975 defence review: Ramgoolam, who opposed the withdrawal of HMS Mauritius, said during a visit by the British defence minister in 1975 that it "does not mean the end of the interest that Great Britain takes in Mauritius", and in March 1976 the Defence Secretary, Roy Mason, told the House of Commons that the withdrawal from Mauritius had been completed.

In the first years of independence Mauritius relied heavily on British aid. After financial talks in London in October 1967, led by Ramgoolam, the British government agreed that "a considerable additional aid would be provided" to meet the island's budget deficits. According to Mauritius, Ramgoolam returned to London in early 1969 to seek development assistance, and British capital grants and other financing "played a vital role in financing the annual budgets of Mauritius in the late 1960s and early 1970s"; the Overseas Development Administration and the Commonwealth Development Corporation financed projects such as the Northern Plains Irrigation Project, and more than 70 per cent of Mauritian export earnings then came from trade with the United Kingdom. In 1987 gross British bilateral aid to Mauritius amounted to about £8 million.

=== High-level visits ===
HMS Ophir at Port Louis in 1901, during the imperial tour of the Duke and Duchess of Cornwall and York; a plate from Donald Mackenzie Wallace's The Web of Empire (1902)

Queen Elizabeth II paid a royal visit to Mauritius in March 1972. Mauritian prime ministers have met their British counterparts at 10 Downing Street in 1965, 2008 and 2012, and at Commonwealth Heads of Government Meetings and other summits.

Mauritian leaders' visits to the United Kingdom and meetings with British prime ministers (Note: The tables list the visits and meetings for which official records or reliable reports were found, and are not complete. Sources consulted include the Cabinet decisions published by the Mauritian Prime Minister's Office (1999–2025), the British Court Circular (from 1997), Number 10 and Foreign Office readouts on GOV.UK, and Hansard.)
| Date | Mauritian leader | Venue | Purpose or outcome |
|---|---|---|---|
| 23 September 1965 | Seewoosagur Ramgoolam, Premier | 10 Downing Street | Meeting with Harold Wilson during the constitutional conference, at which the detachment of the Chagos Archipelago was raised |
| October 1967 | Seewoosagur Ramgoolam | London | Financial talks; Britain agreed to additional aid |
| 25 October 1997 | Navin Ramgoolam, Prime Minister | CHOGM, Edinburgh | Received by the Queen at the Palace of Holyroodhouse |
| 1–5 March 2000 | Cassam Uteem, President | London | Welcomed on the Queen's behalf at Heathrow; visited the Queen on 2 March |
| 26–27 November 2001 | Deputy Prime Minister and Minister of Finance | London | Talks with the Foreign Secretary, Jack Straw, and the Minister for Africa, Baroness Amos |
| 22–27 November 2005 | Navin Ramgoolam | CHOGM, Malta | Meeting with Tony Blair on the reform of the EU sugar regime, the end of the Multi Fibre Arrangement and the Chagos; Britain then agreed to visits to the archipelago by Chagossians |
| November 2007 | Navin Ramgoolam | CHOGM, Kampala | Meeting with the British prime minister, at which Ramgoolam proposed talks on Mauritian sovereignty over the Chagos before 2016 |
| June 2008 | Navin Ramgoolam | 10 Downing Street | Meeting of Commonwealth leaders on the reform of international financial institutions, chaired by Gordon Brown, during a mission to the United Kingdom and France from 8 to 14 June; bilateral talks on the Chagos |
| 27–29 November 2009 | Navin Ramgoolam | CHOGM, Port of Spain | Meeting with Gordon Brown on sovereignty over the Chagos and the planned marine protected area |
| February 2012 | Navin Ramgoolam | Lancaster House, London | London Conference on Somalia, at David Cameron's invitation; meeting with Cameron on piracy |
| 8 June 2012 | Navin Ramgoolam | 10 Downing Street | Meeting with David Cameron on the Chagos and piracy; signature of a memorandum on the transfer of suspected pirates to Mauritius; attended the Queen's Diamond Jubilee celebrations |
| April 2013 | Navin Ramgoolam | London | Funeral of Margaret Thatcher, at Cameron's invitation; meeting with Cameron |
| April 2018 | Pravind Jugnauth, Prime Minister | CHOGM, London | Summit and meetings on the Chagos; the Queen's dinner for Commonwealth heads of government at Buckingham Palace on 19 April |
| March 2019 | Pravind Jugnauth | United Kingdom | Meeting with Theresa May and David Lidington on the Chagos |
| January 2020 | Pravind Jugnauth | London | UK–Africa Investment Summit; meetings with Boris Johnson and the Trade Secretary, Liz Truss |
| 2 November 2021 | Pravind Jugnauth | COP26, Glasgow | Launch, with the British, Indian and other prime ministers, of the Infrastructure for Resilient Islands initiative |
| June 2022 | Pravind Jugnauth | CHOGM, Kigali | Meeting with Boris Johnson on the Chagos |
| 21 September 2022 | Pravind Jugnauth | United Nations General Assembly, New York | Meeting with Liz Truss, after which the two governments decided to open negotiations on the Chagos |
| 9 September 2023 | Pravind Jugnauth | G20 summit, New Delhi | Meeting with Rishi Sunak on cooperation "as Commonwealth partners" and the negotiations |
| 23 July 2024 | Pravind Jugnauth | United Kingdom | Meetings with Keir Starmer and the Foreign Secretary, David Lammy; agreement to continue the negotiations |
| 26 September 2026 | Navin Ramgoolam | London | Talks on the Chagos with the National Security Adviser, Jonathan Powell, and other officials |
| 4 November 2026 | Navin Ramgoolam | CHOGM, St John's, Antigua and Barbuda | Meeting with Andy Burnham on the Chagos; agreement to work on a shared plan to make further progress by the end of the year |

Starmer and Ramgoolam signed the 2025 Chagos treaty on 22 May 2025 in a virtual ceremony held "at London and Port Louis", not during a visit.

British royal and official visits to Mauritius
| Date | Visitor | Purpose or outcome |
|---|---|---|
| March 1972 | Queen Elizabeth II | Royal visit; the Bank of Mauritius presented her with a commemorative coin |
| 30 September – 2 October 1998 | The Princess Royal | Called on the prime minister and the president, opened a British business exhibition and laid a wreath at the tomb of Seewoosagur Ramgoolam |
| 6–9 November 2003 | The Earl of Wessex | Bicentenary of the stay of Matthew Flinders and Nicolas Baudin; visited Rodrigues and called on the president and the prime minister, Paul Bérenger |
| 11–12 October 2006 | The Earl of Wessex | Duke of Edinburgh's Award events; called on the president and the prime minister |
| 21–25 October 2008 | The Earl of Wessex | International meetings of the Duke of Edinburgh's Award; called on the president and the prime minister |
| 1–4 December 2010 | The Princess Royal | Bicentenary of the 1810 capitulation; unveiled a monument to the landing of British forces near Cap Malheureux in 1810 and called on the president and the prime minister |
| 28 February – 1 March 2016 | Lord Mountevans, Lord Mayor of London | Business delegation promoting financial and professional services |
| 31 January 2022 | Lord Ahmad of Wimbledon, Minister of State | One-day visit; inaugurated the new British High Commission building in Floréal with President Prithvirajsing Roopun and held talks with the foreign minister, Alan Ganoo |
| 17 April 2023 | Andrew Selous, Prime Minister's Trade Envoy | Three-day visit; signature of the UK–Mauritius Strategic Trade Partnership |
| 3 October 2023 | Andrew Selous | African Partnership Conference; courtesy call on the prime minister |
| 25 November 2024 | Jonathan Powell, the British prime minister's envoy for the negotiations (not a minister) | Briefed Ramgoolam on the negotiations; a delegation of British officials followed from 9 to 12 December 2024 |

=== Diplomatic relations ===
At independence in 1968 Leckraz Teelock, who had been the colony's Commissioner in London, became the first Mauritian High Commissioner, and Arthur Wooller the first British High Commissioner in Port Louis (see below). Both countries belong to the Commonwealth, which Mauritius joined at independence, and both are members of the United Nations and founding members of the World Trade Organization, which they joined on 1 January 1995. A British member of parliament serves as trade envoy to Mauritius and South Africa: Andrew Selous held the post as the prime minister's trade envoy in 2023, and in January 2026 the Business and Trade Secretary appointed Calvin Bailey.

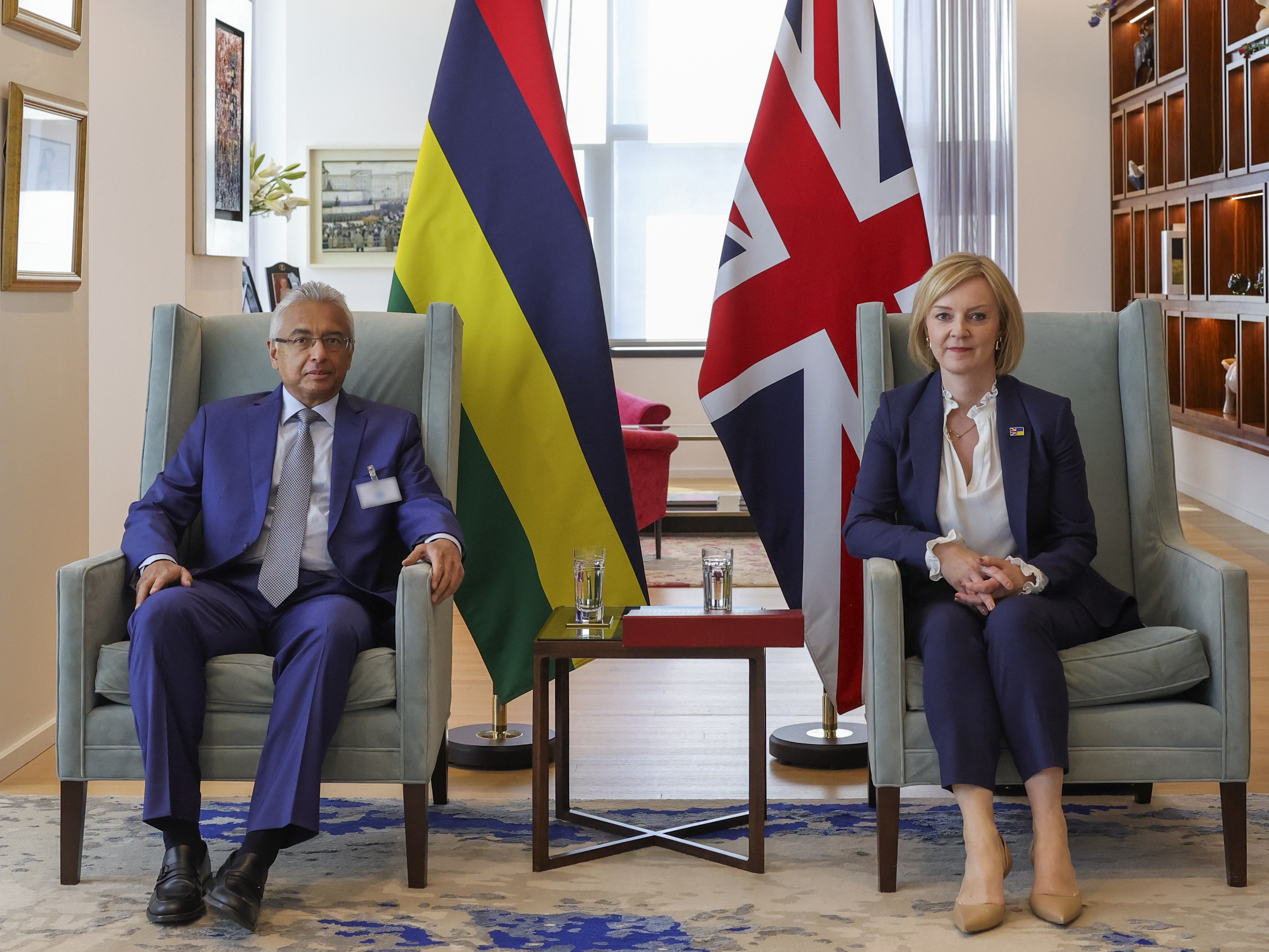
Liz Truss and Pravind Jugnauth at a bilateral meeting during the UN General Assembly in New York, 21 September 2022

Rishi Sunak and Jugnauth at the 2023 G20 New Delhi summit, 9 September 2023

Both governments have described the relationship in warm terms. In February 2023 a Downing Street readout said that the two prime ministers had "reflected on the strong and historic relationship between the UK and Mauritius, as close Commonwealth partners", and the Mauritian Cabinet recorded their commitment "to further strengthen the excellent relations between Mauritius and the UK". In January 2022 the Mauritian foreign minister, Alan Ganoo, spoke of "the good and friendly relation between Mauritius and the UK". In the communiqué establishing a Strategic Partnership Framework in May 2025, the two foreign ministers said that their countries "enjoy deep historical ties", and that relations were entering "a new era" after the Chagos agreement. The British prime minister, Andy Burnham, set out in September 2026 "his intention for the UK and Mauritius to work closely together".

== The Chagos dispute ==
Map of Diego Garcia, in the Chagos Archipelago

The dispute over the Chagos Archipelago has been the main source of tension between the two countries since independence. In September 1965, during the negotiations on Mauritian independence, the Mauritian ministers agreed in principle to its detachment in return for £3 million and a set of undertakings, including its return when it was no longer needed for defence, and on 8 November 1965 the United Kingdom created the British Indian Ocean Territory (BIOT) by Order in Council. Under a 1966 agreement with the United States, the United Kingdom bought the plantations and, between 1967 and 1973, prevented islanders who had left from returning and removed those who remained to Mauritius and Seychelles; Diego Garcia became the site of a joint British and American military base.

Mauritius took up the claim in 1980, when the Organisation of African Unity demanded that Diego Garcia be "unconditionally returned to Mauritius" and Ramgoolam told the United Nations General Assembly that the BIOT should be disbanded. The British position, as stated to the General Assembly in 1999, was that the territory "is British and has been since 1814" and "will be ceded when no longer required for defence purposes". The African Union supported the claim, describing the archipelago in 2010 as detached "by the former colonial power from the territory of Mauritius in violation of" General Assembly resolutions, and in 2017 resolving to support "the completion of the decolonization of the Republic of Mauritius".

The Commonwealth link shaped the legal routes open to Mauritius. Mauritius could not bring a contentious case against the United Kingdom before the International Court of Justice (ICJ) without the United Kingdom's consent. On 25 January 2001 the Mauritian foreign minister asked whether the two governments could agree to take the sovereignty dispute to the ICJ; the United Kingdom did not agree. In 2004 Mauritius indicated that it intended to bring proceedings and was prepared to leave the Commonwealth to found the court's jurisdiction. "In order to prevent this from happening", in the words of the British written statement to the court, the United Kingdom replaced its declaration on 5 July 2004 with one excluding "any dispute with the government of any other country which is or has been a Member of the Commonwealth". The United Kingdom later told the court that from then on Mauritius regarded advisory proceedings as "an alternative route to a contentious case".

The dispute widened after the United Kingdom declared a marine protected area around the archipelago on 1 April 2010; Mauritius protested that it would not recognise it and in December began arbitration proceedings under the United Nations Convention on the Law of the Sea. In its award of 18 March 2015 the tribunal (Mauritius v United Kingdom) found that it had no jurisdiction over sovereignty, but held that the 1965 undertakings were legally binding and that the protected area breached the convention.

In June 2016, after the Prime Minister, Anerood Jugnauth, said that Mauritius would seek an advisory opinion of the ICJ, the British High Commission and the US Embassy in Port Louis warned in a joint press statement that a referral "would cause lasting damage to Mauritius' bilateral relations with both the UK and the USA"; the Prime Minister's Office called the warning "hostile and totally unacceptable".

Mauritius went ahead. Talks requested by the United Kingdom began in Port Louis on 9 November 2016 but did not resolve the dispute, and on 22 June 2017 the General Assembly adopted resolution 71/292, asking the ICJ for an advisory opinion, by 94 votes to 15; the United Kingdom and the United States voted against. In its opinion of 25 February 2019 the court found, by 13 votes to 1, that the decolonisation of Mauritius "was not lawfully completed" and that the United Kingdom "is under an obligation to bring to an end its administration of the Chagos Archipelago as rapidly as possible". The African Union, the only international organisation among the participants, had filed a written statement and taken part in the hearings. In resolution 73/295, adopted on 22 May 2019 by 116 votes to 6, the General Assembly demanded that the United Kingdom withdraw "its colonial administration from the Chagos Archipelago unconditionally within a period of no more than six months". The British government said that the opinion was not legally binding, and the deadline passed on 22 November 2019 without a withdrawal.

On 14 February 2022, during a survey of Blenheim Reef carried out for the case against the Maldives, Mauritian officials accompanied by Chagossians raised the Mauritian flag on Peros Banhos; the Foreign Office said that the United Kingdom did not recognise Mauritius's claim.

Keir Starmer at a press conference at the Permanent Joint Headquarters, Northwood, on 22 May 2025, after signing the agreement on the military base on Diego Garcia

The two governments announced on 3 November 2022 that they would negotiate on the exercise of sovereignty, saying in a joint statement that an agreement would allow them, "as close Commonwealth partners, to work even more closely together". On 3 October 2024 the prime ministers, Keir Starmer and Pravind Jugnauth, announced a political agreement, which they called "a seminal moment in our relationship", promising a future "based on mutual respect and trust as close Commonwealth partners". After Jugnauth's government lost the general election, his successor, Navin Ramgoolam, ordered an independent review of the draft treaty and renegotiated its financial terms. On 22 May 2025 Starmer and Ramgoolam signed the Agreement concerning the Chagos Archipelago including Diego Garcia, under which Mauritius is sovereign over the whole archipelago and authorises the United Kingdom to exercise its sovereign rights over Diego Garcia for an initial 99 years. The African Union welcomed the 2024 agreement and the 2025 treaty. The treaty had not entered into force by November 2026: the British government said in April 2026 that a change in the American president's position made it "impossible to agree at political level" an update to the 1966 UK–US agreement on the base, the implementing bill lapsed at the end of the parliamentary session on 29 April, and on 13 October the government said that "an agreement with Mauritius must protect UK interests and command US support". Burnham and Ramgoolam met during the leaders' retreat at the Commonwealth Heads of Government Meeting in Antigua on 4 November 2026; according to Downing Street they agreed "to work on a shared plan to make further progress by the end of the year", and Ramgoolam's office said that he had stressed the need for a clear roadmap with a first deadline in December 2026. Returning from the summit, Burnham told The Economist that the government was in discussion with the United States "to see how we might recast the arrangement that better meets their concerns", and said of the agreement reached over Greenland: "maybe there is something there we can take from that".

== Diplomatic missions ==
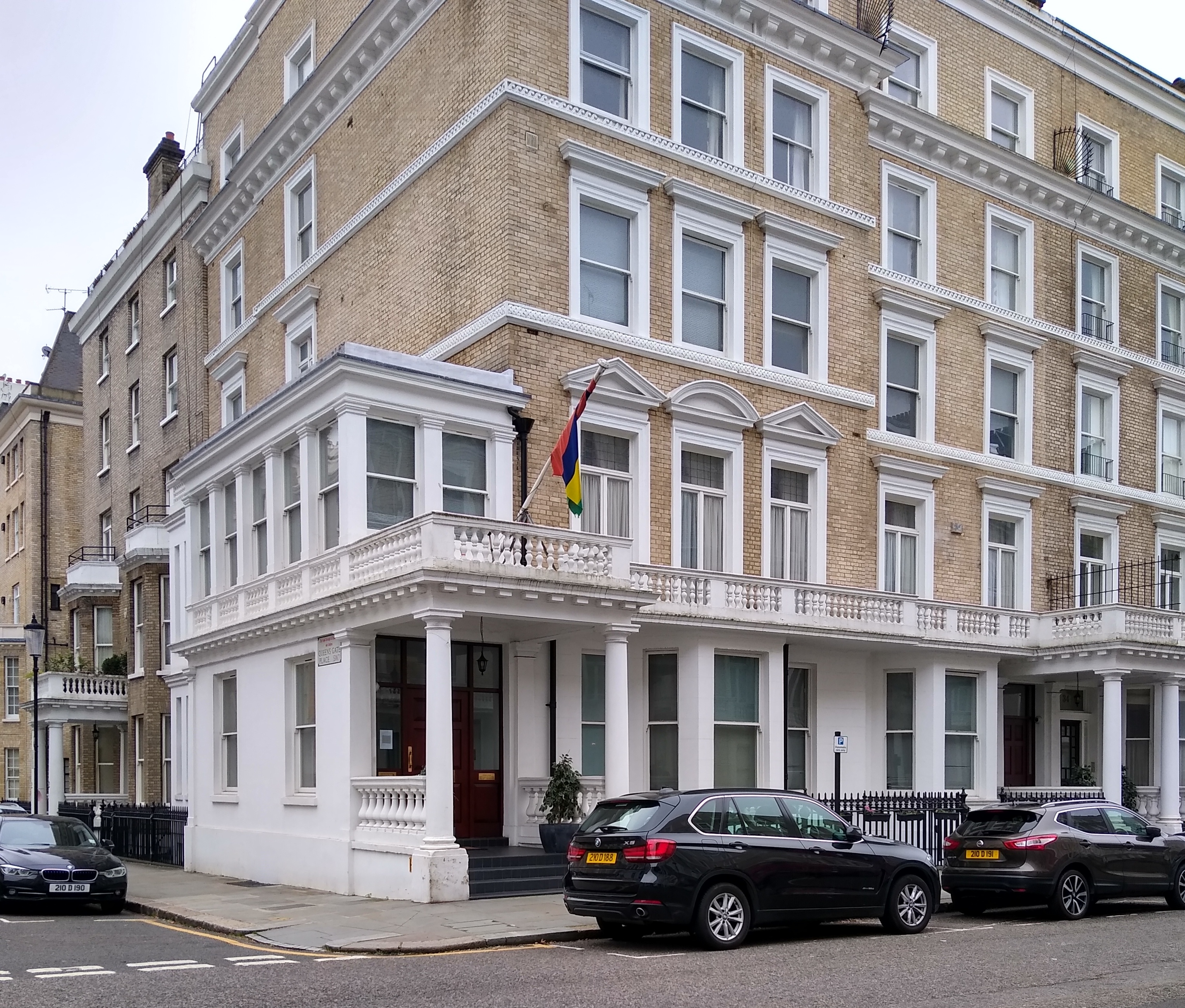
The High Commission of Mauritius in London, 2020

The Mauritius High Commission in London is at 32/33 Elvaston Place, London SW7. The British High Commission, formerly on Edith Cavell Street in Port Louis, moved to new premises in Floréal, inaugurated on 31 January 2022; its postal address is Sir Hesketh Bell Street, Floréal. The staff of the British government's trade department in Mauritius work from the High Commission. As of October 2026 the high commissioners were Rajeshwar Jeetah in London and Paul Brummell in Port Louis.

=== Mauritian high commissioners in London ===
High commissioners of Mauritius to the United Kingdom (Note: The list is compiled from the sources cited and may be incomplete. Acting heads of mission are not listed: Mohamed Iqbal Latona was acting high commissioner from February 2015, and Anandrao Hurree was chargé d'affaires from November 2024. "Accredited" dates are those given in The Statesman's Year-Book; dates of letters of commission are those of the audience with the monarch recorded in the Court Circular.)
| High commissioner | Dates | Notes |
|---|---|---|
| Leckraz Teelock (knighted 1972) | 1968 – May 1982 | Previously Commissioner in London; died in office as doyen of the diplomatic corps |
| L. Claude Obeegadoo | Accredited 9 February 1983 | |
| Dhurma Gian Nath | Accredited 13 December 1983 | |
| Soo Soobiah | Accredited 18 February 1988 | |
| Boodhun Teelock | Accredited 23 February 1989 | |
| Babooram Mahadoo | Listed 1992–1995 | |
| Sir Satcam Boolell | 1996–2001 | Former deputy prime minister |
| Mohunlall Goburdhun | 3 May 2001 – 30 December 2004 | Letters of commission presented 3 May 2001 |
| Jaynarain Meetoo | 16 March – 15 August 2005 | |
| Abhimanu Kundasamy | 5 December 2005 – 2015 | Letters of commission presented 28 February 2006 |
| Girish Nunkoo | 9 August 2015 – November 2024 | Letters of commission presented 4 November 2015; farewell audience 28 November 2024 |
| Rajeshwar Jeetah | 16 June 2025 – | Appointment approved March 2025; letters of commission presented 28 October 2025 |

=== British high commissioners in Mauritius ===
British high commissioners to Mauritius (Note: Where exact dates are not available, the years are those of the high commissioner's first and last despatches from Port Louis recorded in the catalogue of the National Archives. Acting high commissioners are not listed.)
| High commissioner | Dates | Notes |
|---|---|---|
| Arthur Wooller | 1968–1970 | The first British high commissioner |
| Peter Carter | 1971–1973 | |
| Henry Brind | 1974–1977 | |
| Alec Ward | 1977–1981 | |
| James Allan | 1981–1985 | |
| Richard Crowson | 1986–1989 | |
| Michael Howell | 1989–1993 | |
| John Harrison | 1993–1997 | |
| James Daly | In office in 1998 | Received the Princess Royal on 30 September 1998 |
| David Snoxell | 18 September 2000 – November 2004 | |
| Anthony Godson | 29 November 2004 – 2007 | |
| John Murton | May 2007 – 2010 | |
| Nick Leake | September 2010 – 2014 | |
| Jonathan Drew | 19 August 2014 – 2017 | Credentials presented 19 August 2014 |
| Keith Allan | 2017–2021 | |
| Charlotte Pierre | August 2021 – 2025 | |
| Paul Brummell | July 2025 – | |

== British legacy and shared institutions ==
Mauritius was under British rule from 1810 until its independence in 1968. The Judicial Committee of the Privy Council has described Mauritius as having "a hybrid legal system": its private law remained largely French, while "since 1810 many areas of the law, such as company law, insolvency, evidence, and procedure have been influenced by the common law". Its parliamentary institutions, its final court of appeal, the language of its legislature and courts, and the qualifications of many of its lawyers and school-leavers continue to link it to the United Kingdom.

=== Constitution and government ===
Mauritius became independent on 12 March 1968 under a constitution published as the schedule to the Mauritius Independence Order 1968, a British Order in Council, which was complemented in the United Kingdom by the Mauritius Independence Act 1968. The Judicial Committee of the Privy Council has described that constitution as being "on the familiar Westminster-style model", and Mauritius as "a parliamentary democracy on the Westminster model". The constitution is written and declares itself "the supreme law of Mauritius", so that any law inconsistent with it is void to the extent of the inconsistency.

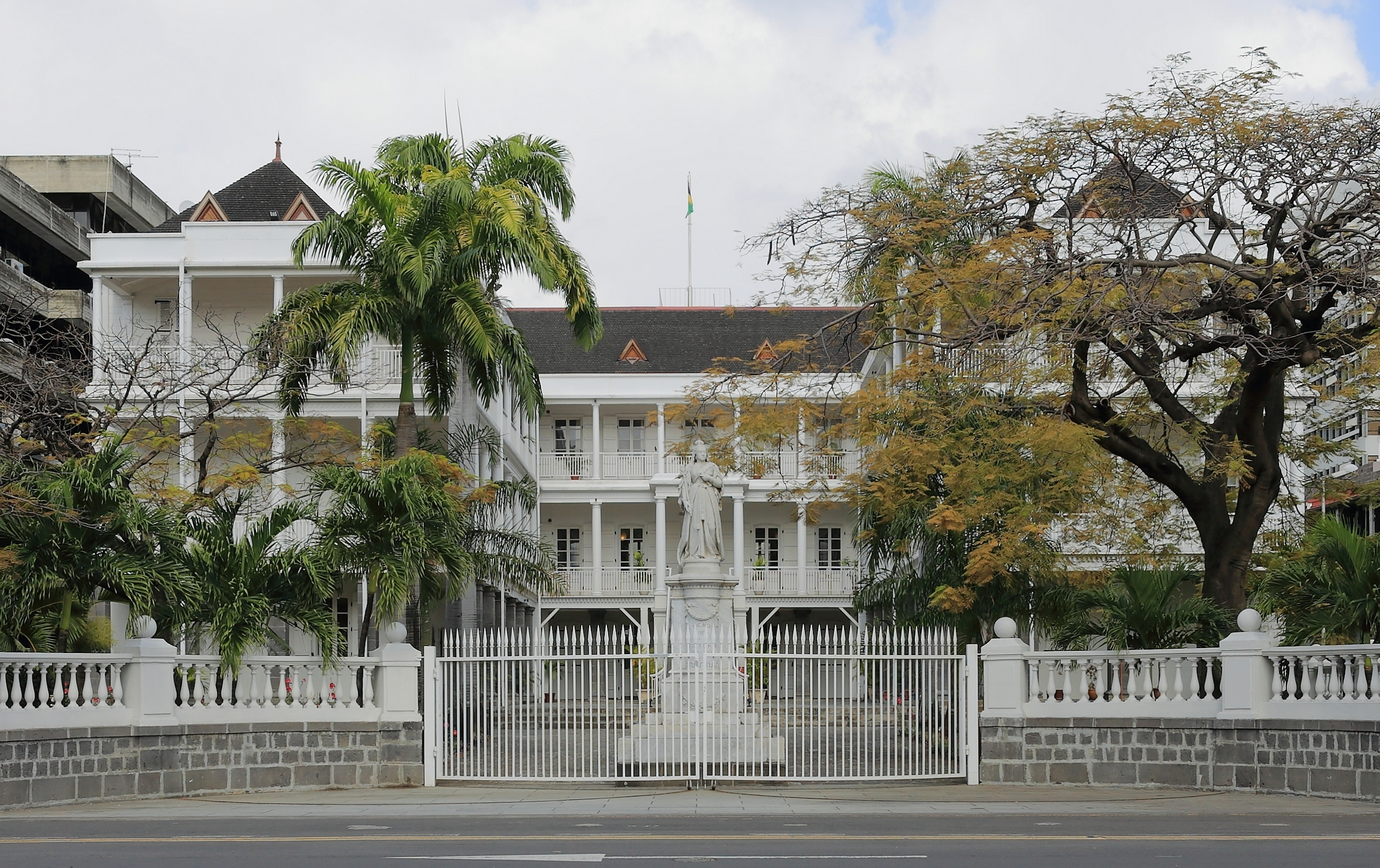
Government House, Port Louis, with the statue of Queen Victoria in front, 2015

Parliament consists of the President and a National Assembly of 70 members. At its first sitting after each general election the Assembly elects a Speaker "from among its members or otherwise". The President appoints as Prime Minister the member of the Assembly "who appears to him best able to command the support of the majority of the members of the Assembly", and the Cabinet is "collectively responsible to the Assembly". The constitution also creates the office of Leader of the Opposition, to which the President appoints the leader of the largest opposition party in the Assembly or, where there is no such party, the member most acceptable to the opposition leaders.

Mauritius was an independent constitutional monarchy until 12 March 1992, when amendments made by the Constitution of Mauritius (Amendment No 3) Act 1991 took effect and the country became a republic. Chapter IV of the constitution, which had dealt with the Governor-General, now provides for a President who is "the Head of State and Commander-in-Chief". The British Parliament passed the Mauritius Republic Act 1992, "an Act to make provision in connection with Mauritius becoming a republic within the Commonwealth". It provided that British law would continue to apply in relation to Mauritius as if it had not become a republic, and allowed the Crown to confer on the Judicial Committee jurisdiction over appeals from Mauritian courts.

=== Legal system ===
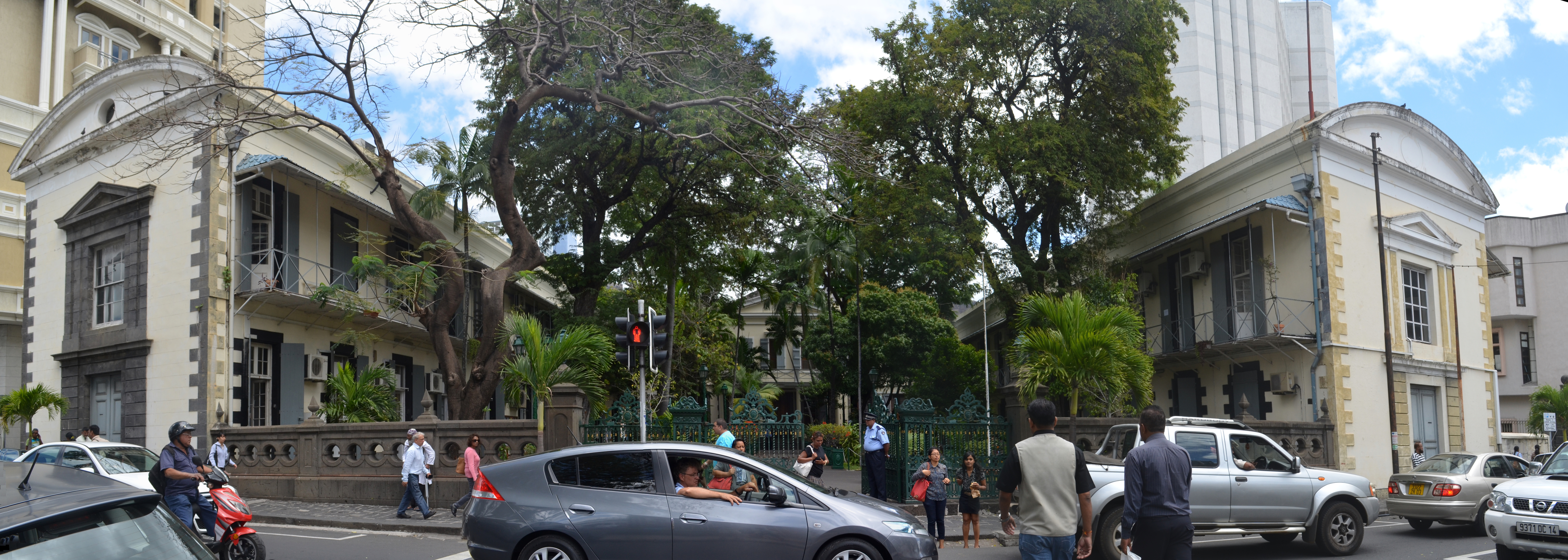
The former Supreme Court of Mauritius building, Port Louis, 2015

Mauritius has a mixed legal system that draws on both French and English law. In the Privy Council's description, the Code Civil Mauricien, "based on the Code Napoleon, has since 1804 governed much of its private law, including the law of contract and the law of delict". The French codes survived the British conquest because article 8 of the act of capitulation of 1810 allowed the colonists to keep their religion, laws and customs. A committee chaired by Lord Phillips of Worth Matravers, which the Mauritian government appointed in 2019 to review the legal profession, summarised the position in 2020: "Its substantive law is essentially derived from the French civil and penal codes, whereas its laws of procedure and evidence are derived from England, as are the specialist areas of shipping, finance and banking law." The committee added that company and insolvency law "are based on the law of New Zealand", and the Privy Council has noted that Mauritian courts draw on New Zealand case law in interpreting the Insolvency Act 2009.

Main sources of Mauritian law, as described by the Privy Council, the Phillips committee and Gunputh
| Area of law | Origin | Examples |
|---|---|---|
| Contract, delict, property, family and succession | French | Code Civil Mauricien, based on the Napoleonic Code |
| Commercial law | French | Code de Commerce |
| Substantive criminal law | French | Penal Code |
| Civil and criminal procedure | English | Courts Act 1945; Criminal Procedure Act 1853 |
| Evidence | English | "the English law of evidence for the time being", applied by section 162 of the Courts Act |
| Constitutional and administrative law | English (Westminster model) | Constitution of 1968; judicial review based on the English Order 53 |
| Shipping, finance and banking | English | |
| Trusts | English | Trusts Act 2001 |
| Company and insolvency law | New Zealand | Companies Act 2001; Insolvency Act 2009 |

Mauritian courts draw on both traditions. According to the Privy Council, they "look to French case-law and doctrine for persuasive guidance in matters borrowed from French law", but they "are not bound to follow French law if there is good reason to do otherwise". Rajendra Parsad Gunputh, dean of the Faculty of Law and Management at the University of Mauritius, wrote in 2022 that the judgments of the Supreme Court "still reflect English legislation, binding precedents, and doctrine, as well as the French Cour de cassation and doctrine, especially in civil matters", and that later statutes have also borrowed from New Zealand, Singapore and Hong Kong. The 1983 Lallah report on legal studies, quoted by the Phillips committee, took the view that Mauritian law had "ceased over the years to be partly English and partly French" and had developed "a philosophy, doctrine and jurisprudence of its own".

=== Judicial Committee of the Privy Council ===
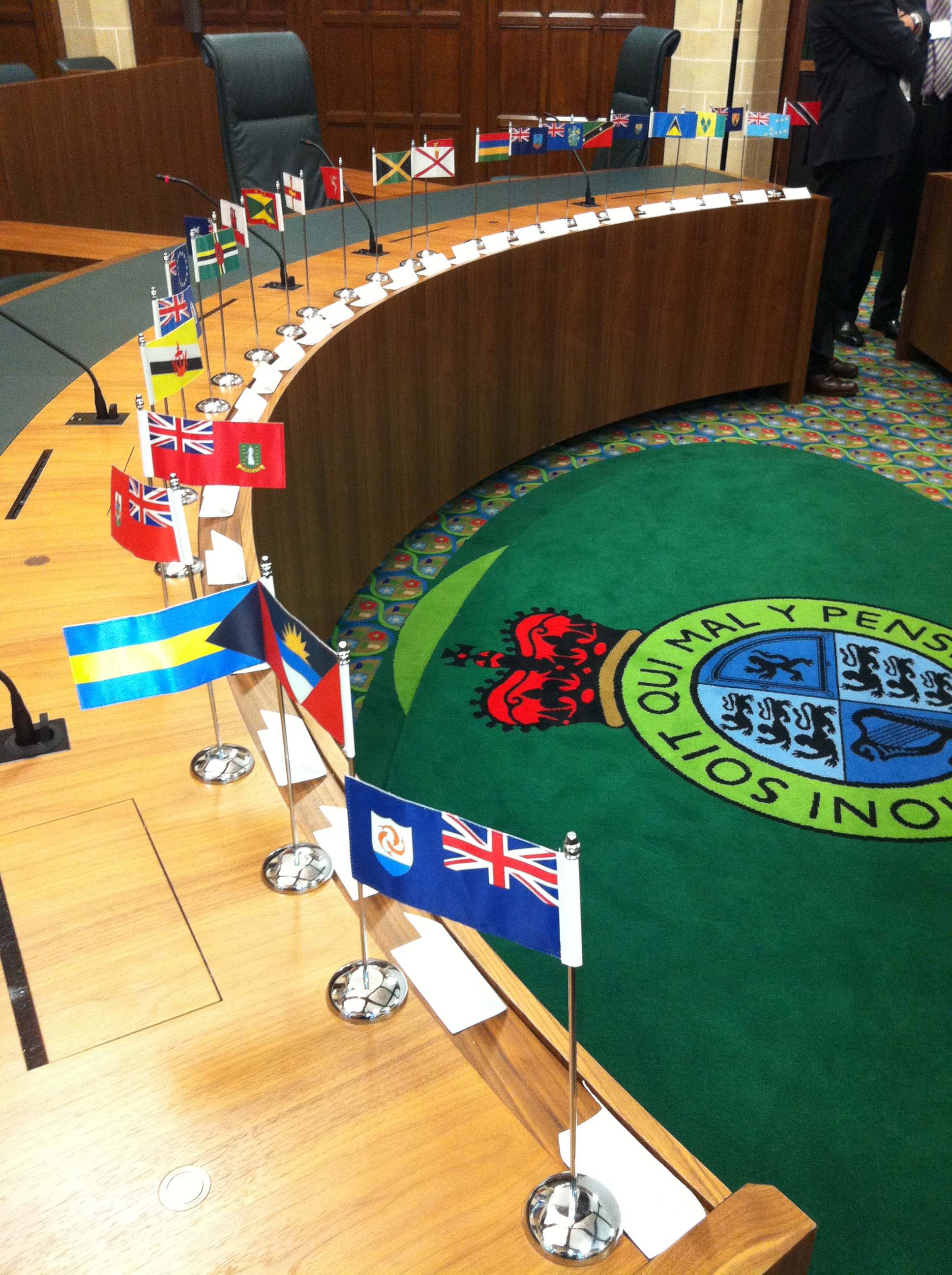
The bench in Court 3 of the Supreme Court of the United Kingdom, Middlesex Guildhall, London, where the Judicial Committee of the Privy Council sits, 2011

The Judicial Committee of the Privy Council in London is Mauritius's final court of appeal. Section 81 of the constitution gives a right of appeal from the Court of Appeal or the Supreme Court to the Judicial Committee in cases that include final decisions on the interpretation of the constitution and civil cases worth 10,000 rupees or more; other civil appeals need the leave of the Mauritian court, which may give it where a question is of "great general or public importance", and the Judicial Committee may itself grant special leave to appeal in any civil or criminal matter. The right of appeal survived the change to a republic in 1992, when the Mauritius Republic Act allowed the Crown to confer the necessary jurisdiction on the Judicial Committee by Order in Council. The Judicial Committee's practice directions list the Mauritius Appeals to Judicial Committee Order 1992 among the instruments governing Mauritian appeals, and count Mauritius among the "independent republics within the Commonwealth" from which "an appeal lies to the Judicial Committee itself", rather than to the monarch in council as from the Commonwealth realms.

The Judicial Committee's annual report for 2025–26 states that it "continues to receive the highest number of cases from Trinidad and Tobago and Mauritius". In that year it received 24 cases from Mauritius, second only to the 36 from Trinidad and Tobago, and gave four judgments in Mauritian appeals; in 2024–25 it had received 13 Mauritian cases and given five judgments in them.

The Judicial Committee has ruled against the Mauritian state or its agencies in several appeals. In Khoyratty (2006) it dismissed the state's appeal against the Supreme Court's ruling that the 1994 constitutional amendment restricting bail was void. In Dhooharika v Director of Public Prosecutions (2014) it quashed the conviction of the editor of the weekly Samedi Plus, whom the Supreme Court had sentenced in 2011 to three months' imprisonment for scandalising the court over articles about the Chief Justice; it held that the offence still existed in Mauritius, but that the editor should have been allowed to give evidence and had not been proved to have acted in bad faith.

In Betamax Ltd v State Trading Corporation (2021) the Judicial Committee restored an arbitral award against a public company. In 2009 the State Trading Corporation (STC), a public company that acts as the Mauritian government's trading arm for imports of essential commodities, had contracted with Betamax, a Mauritian company, to build a tanker and carry its petroleum products from Mangalore to Port Louis for 15 years. After a new government took office in December 2014, the Cabinet announced on 30 January 2015 that the contract would be terminated because of "the unlawful procedure and processes regarding the allocation of the contract"; Betamax ended the contract in April 2015 and began arbitration under the rules of the Singapore International Arbitration Centre. On 5 June 2017 the arbitrator found that the contract was exempt from the Public Procurement Act 2006 and was not illegal, and awarded Betamax US$115.3 million in damages, with interest and costs. On 31 May 2019 the Supreme Court of Mauritius set the award aside as contrary to Mauritian public policy, holding that the contract had been made in flagrant breach of the procurement legislation. On 14 June 2021 the Judicial Committee allowed Betamax's appeal: it held that the Supreme Court had not been entitled to review the arbitrator's findings on legality, that the contract was in any event exempt from the procurement regime, and that the award could be enforced.

Betamax then demanded about Rs 5.7 billion from the STC, including interest and costs. According to the STC's annual report, it paid Betamax damages of Rs 5.5 billion in June 2021 "with the assistance of the Government", and Betamax then lodged further claims for costs. L'Express reported in 2024 that the government had had to pay more than Rs 5.7 billion. The former finance minister Rama Sithanen said that the population was paying for the government's irresponsibility, which he attributed to stubbornness and political revenge. The economist Pierre Dinan told L'Express that the judgment showed potential investors, especially foreign ones, that they could take disputes to judges in London whom he considered free of prejudice because of their distance from Mauritius.

Mauritius has retained the appeal, and the Judicial Committee listed it in 2026 among the jurisdictions for which it is the final court of appeal. The government's programme for 2025–2029, presented in January 2025, announced that "a superior court of appeal, as recommended in Lord Mackay's Report, will be established to hear appeals from the Supreme Court and arbitration tribunals". The proposal, under which retired judges and judges from other Commonwealth countries would sit, led critics to ask whether it might signal a move towards replacing the Privy Council; Mauritius Times's legal columnist "Lex" argued that the new court was unrelated to the Privy Council, which "will remain the final court of appeal" unless the government decided otherwise, and that a foreign final court "provides an additional assurance of the local court's efficiency and independence" to a country dependent on foreign investment.

=== Language ===
An English-language sign of Airports of Mauritius, 2011

The constitution names no official language for the state as a whole. Section 49 provides: "The official language of the Assembly shall be English but any member may address the chair in French." Under the Courts Act 1945, "the official language to be used in the Supreme Court of Mauritius shall be English", and English is also the language of the Intermediate and District Courts, although "any person may address the Court in French". The British government's Permanent Committee on Geographical Names notes that English and French are both used in government and education, while Mauritian Creole is the lingua franca. Both languages are used in legislation: the Phillips committee considered that lawyers must be literate in both because "Mauritius is a bilingual society and both English and French are the languages of enactments".

English is little spoken at home: at the 2022 census 0.6 per cent of residents usually spoke English at home, against 78.6 per cent who spoke Creole.

=== Legal profession ===
The legal profession in Mauritius has three branches: barristers, whose role resembles that of the English barrister or the French avocat; attorneys, whose role broadly reflects that of the English solicitor; and notaries, who handle property transactions and draw up legal documents. In 2020 there were about 900 barristers, 200 attorneys and 60 notaries. Until the 1980s the Mauritian bar was open to "those who had qualified as barristers, as members of one of the Inns of Court in the United Kingdom", while attorneys and notaries trained by apprenticeship. The Lallah committee on legal studies reported in 1983 that training for the English Bar was not a satisfactory route to practice in Mauritius, as it taught much that was useless there, omitted the French codes and specifically Mauritian law, and had become "prohibitively expensive". The Law Practitioners Act 1984 therefore created a local route of a law degree, a vocational course and examinations overseen by a Council of Legal Education, and pupillage; after amendments in 2011 the course was run by the University of Mauritius and the council was renamed the Council for Vocational Legal Education.

=== Education ===
==== Cambridge examinations ====
Royal College Port Louis, 2006

Mauritian pupils have sat the examinations of the University of Cambridge since the 19th century: Cambridge received applications to hold its local examinations in Mauritius in the 1870s, and in 1898 "Cambridge week" on the island had to be postponed because the steamer carrying the papers had been delayed. The Mauritius Examinations Syndicate (MES), "established in 1984", organises the School Certificate/GCE O-level and the Higher School Certificate/GCE A-level "in collaboration with Cambridge Assessment International Education". The syllabuses, examinations and marking of the two certificates are carried out by Cambridge International jointly with the MES.

The Mauritian system followed what Maulloo and Naugah call "the English model of 3+6+5+2" until the Nine-Year Continuous Basic Education reform was introduced in January 2017. In January 2026 the Cabinet decided that Kreol Morisien would be offered as a main subject for the Higher School Certificate; the education minister stressed that it would be marked by the National Examinations Board and not by Cambridge.

==== Language of instruction ====
English has remained the official medium of instruction in Mauritian schools since independence. The Education Ordinance 1957 provided that from Standard IV of primary school "the medium of instruction shall be English", although any suitable language could be used in the lower classes. The Education Act lists among the Minister's responsibilities "the more effective teaching of English and the spread of the English Language in Mauritius". A 2017 study of Mauritian primary education found that English had kept that status "despite the fact that it is used minimally within the broader Mauritian society", that the main examinations, apart from language papers, must be answered in English, that French is compulsory, and that Kreol Morisien has been taught as an optional language since 2012.

==== British universities and qualifications ====
Middlesex University opened a branch campus in Mauritius, which it describes as the first accredited British branch campus there, in 2009 according to the university, or 2010 according to Times Higher Education; it moved to Flic-en-Flac in 2017 and says that it has more than 1,600 students from over 40 countries. In 2022 it was the only international branch campus in Mauritius, and of the 39 institutions whose qualifications were taught by private providers, 14 were listed as from the United Kingdom and one from Scotland. In 2014 the British High Commission estimated that 15,000 students and professionals in Mauritius, "a third of all higher education students", were working towards a British qualification. In 2025 the UK's Quality Assurance Agency signed a memorandum of understanding with Mauritius's Higher Education Commission, intended "to reduce the need for the local accreditation of recognised UK higher education institutions in Mauritius"; it put the number of students in Mauritius registered with British providers at around 3,000.

==== Mauritian students in the United Kingdom ====
The number of Mauritians studying in Britain has fallen since the early 2010s. Mauritius's Higher Education Commission counted 3,058 Mauritian students in the United Kingdom in 2010 and 950 in 2022, when Britain was the fourth most common destination for Mauritians studying abroad, after France (1,589), Canada (1,300) and Australia (1,265). Figures from the UK's Higher Education Statistics Agency (HESA) show a similar decline among Mauritius-domiciled students at British higher education providers:

Mauritius-domiciled students at UK higher education providers (Note: HESA figures are rounded, so the undergraduate and postgraduate figures may not add up to the total.)
| Academic year | Undergraduate | Postgraduate | Total |
|---|---|---|---|
| 2014/15 | 860 | 440 | 1,300 |
| 2015/16 | 815 | 420 | 1,230 |
| 2016/17 | 785 | 365 | 1,150 |
| 2017/18 | 735 | 385 | 1,115 |
| 2018/19 | 700 | 355 | 1,060 |
| 2019/20 | 665 | 365 | 1,025 |
| 2020/21 | 585 | 345 | 930 |
| 2021/22 | 540 | 360 | 900 |

Home Office figures show the same trend: Mauritian main applicants were granted 726 sponsored study visas in 2010, 437 in 2015, 228 in 2020 and 377 in 2025. (Note: Annual totals of the quarterly figures for visas issued to main applicants under the Tier 4 (General) and Student routes, calculated from the Home Office dataset.) The best Higher School Certificate candidates each year, known as laureates, receive state scholarships to study abroad, and there were 49 for the 2025 examinations; L'Express reported in 2026 that some of that year's laureates had chosen British universities and others Australian ones. The link is long-standing: in 1984 Margaret Thatcher told the Mauritian prime minister, Anerood Jugnauth, that Britain would provide another £20,000 for awards to Mauritian students and would try to take one or two more of the country's laureate scholars.

==== Scholarships and alumni ====
Since the Chevening programme began in 1983, 167 Mauritians have held Chevening Scholarships for a year's master's study in the United Kingdom; three were selected for 2025–26, and a Chevening Alumni Association (Mauritius) was launched in August 2025. The minister of labour, Reza Uteem, a Chevening scholar in 1995, said at the 2025 reception that studying in Britain offered "not only academic excellence but also a unique cultural experience". Commonwealth Scholarships for study in Britain are administered in Mauritius by the Ministry of Education, and Mauritians were among the scholars from small island developing states selected by the Commonwealth Scholarship Commission for its 2026–27 master's scholarships. The British High Commission held an engagement evening for Commonwealth scholarship alumni in Mauritius in July 2026.

==== British Council ====
The British Council has worked in Mauritius since 1950. The National Archives records that it was represented there from 1950 to 1980. In August 1984 Margaret Thatcher wrote to Anerood Jugnauth, who had asked for its return, that the withdrawal had been one of several public expenditure economies and that for the time being its programme would continue to be run through the British High Commission. The Council now has an office and language centre in Rose Hill, where it runs IELTS tests, including, since February 2024, IELTS for UK Visas and Immigration; in 2014 it began English classes for children at Grand Baie. It also organises examinations for British professional bodies and universities, and its partners include the Association of Chartered Certified Accountants. With the Ministry of Education it has trained English teachers and, since 2010, held some 80 workshops for more than 200 school rectors, deputy rectors and quality assurance officers; with Ofsted it has worked on a quality assurance framework for Mauritian schools. Its country director said in 2016 that "Mauritians need English more than they ever did in the past", in a world where English was "the prominent language of business and education".

=== Everyday life and culture ===
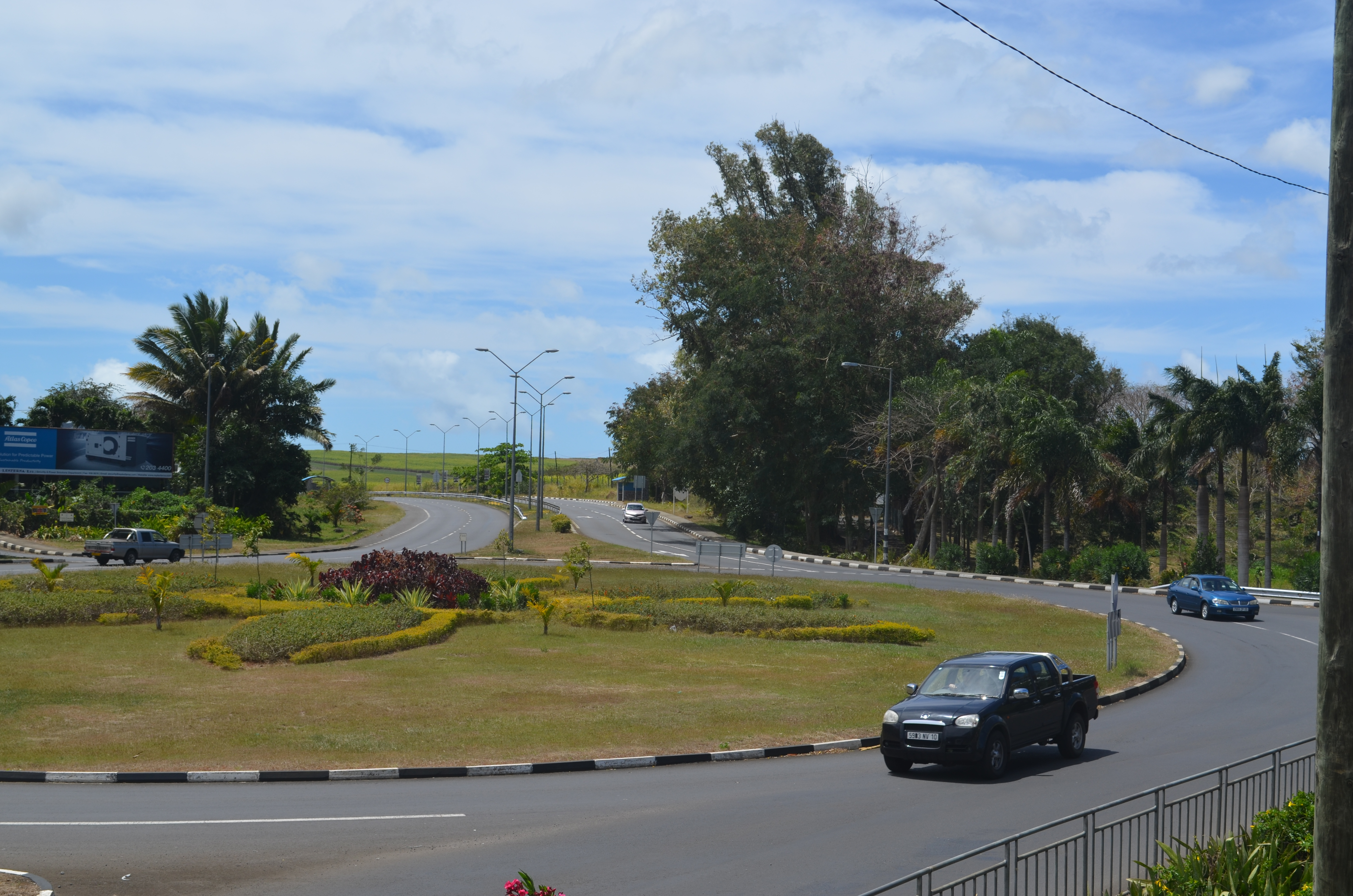
A roundabout on the M2 motorway at Pamplemousses, 2015

Vehicles in Mauritius drive on the left. The British government's travel advice notes that "as in the UK, left-hand traffic is standard across Mauritius", and its guidance for British residents states that "the traffic code and traffic laws are similar to the UK". Mauritian traffic signs are set by the Traffic Signs Regulations 1990, and the government's road safety guide divides them into three classes: "Circles give orders", "Triangles warn" and "Rectangles inform". Electricity is supplied at 230 volts and 50 hertz, as in the United Kingdom, and the International Electrotechnical Commission lists both the British three-pin plug (type G) and the two-pin type C for Mauritius; the Mauritius Tourism Promotion Authority describes the plugs used as "the British three-square pin and two round pin plugs".

Several Premier League clubs have official supporters' clubs in Mauritius: Liverpool F.C. lists one, Manchester United lists three, and Arsenal lists one. Manchester United's Mauritian clubs hold screenings of matches in Rose Hill and Bagatelle, and L'Express described one of them, Mauritius United Army, as the club's "fan club officiel". Liverpool, which says it has "a large, passionate fan base in Mauritius", opened an International Academy there with the Ministry of Youth and Sport in July 2019, and in July 2020 it made the Mauritius Tourism Promotion Authority and the Economic Development Board its official tourism and economic development partner; the partnership, suspended during the COVID-19 pandemic, was revived in 2022. In 2015 Manchester United made the Mauritian telecommunications company Emtel its first official partner in the country and the broadcaster of its MUTV channel there. The public broadcaster, the Mauritius Broadcasting Corporation, shows one live Premier League match every Saturday, 33 a season, on free-to-air television; in April 2025 Prime Minister Navin Ramgoolam told the National Assembly that it had secured the rights until 2028 and was working on an election promise to broadcast every Premier League match. Premier League matches are also carried on pay television by Canal+ and SuperSport. English clubs have visited for decades: Tottenham Hotspur toured Mauritius in 1974, when a crowd of 18,000 watched it beat a Mauritius Select XI 5–0 at Curepipe.

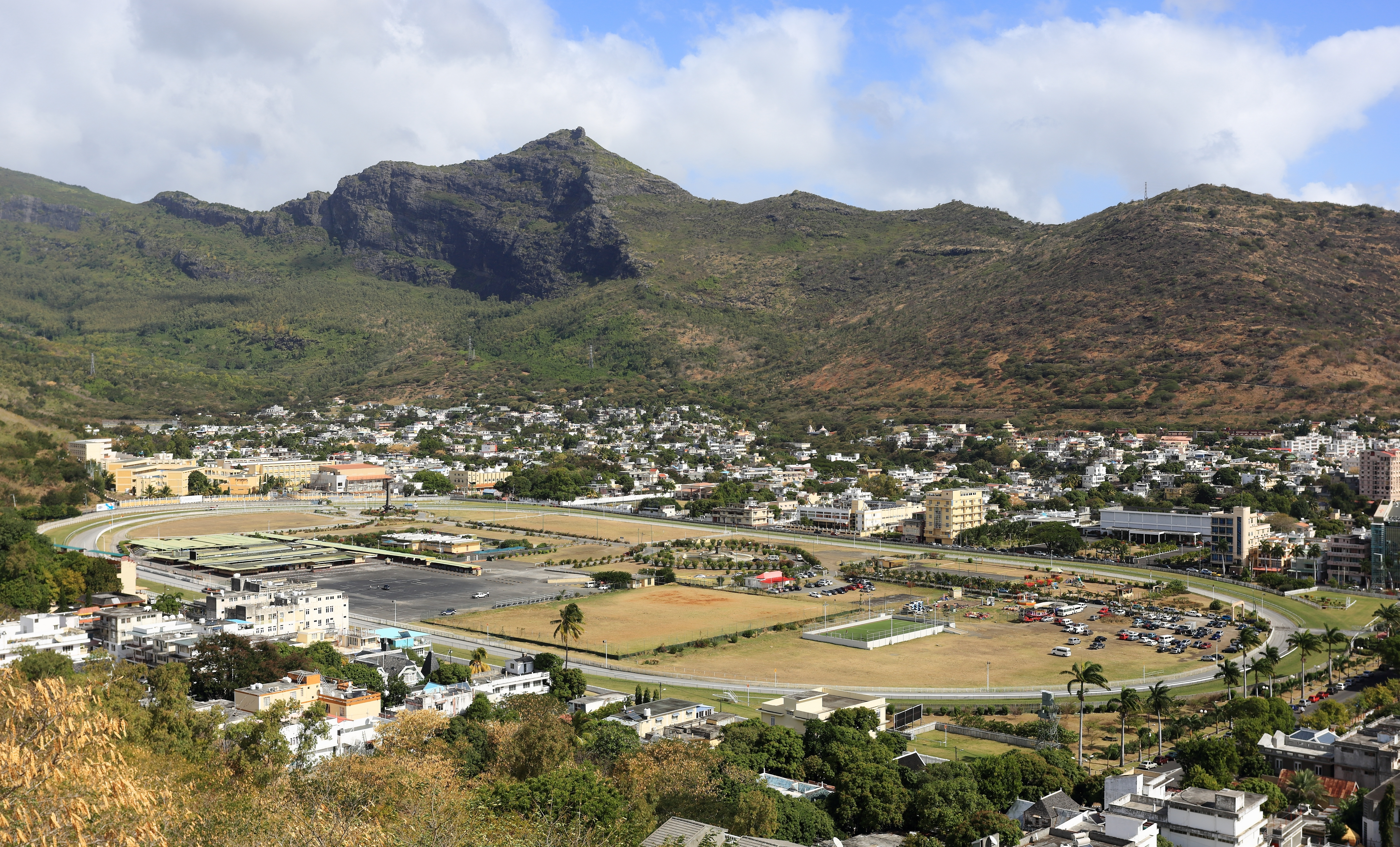
The Champ de Mars Racecourse, Port Louis, 2015

Horse racing at the Champ de Mars in Port Louis dates from the first years of British rule. The first races were held there on 25 June 1812, and the Mauritius Turf Club states that its founders aimed "to reconcile the French settlers with the English administration who had conquered the island in December 1810"; it calls Colonel Draper, who promoted racing there for some twenty years, the "Father" of the club. The Asian Racing Federation describes the club, now the MTC Jockey Club, as "believed to be the oldest horse racing club in the Southern Hemisphere and the third oldest club in the world"; the club calls the Champ de Mars "the oldest racecourse in the southern hemisphere", while the Mauritius Tourism Promotion Authority calls it the second-oldest. According to the tourism authority, the Champ de Mars was also where Mauritius's independence was declared in 1968.

British-era names survive in some institutions. The Royal College Curepipe, whose history goes back to a French college founded in 1791, received the name Royal College under British rule; the school dates the change to a decree of Governor Robert Farquhar in January 1813, while the historian Vina Ballgobin dates it to 1817. The school notes that "the name has remained till this day despite the accession of Mauritius to the status of Republic". The Royal Society of Arts and Sciences of Mauritius, founded in 1829 by Charles Telfair and Julien Desjardins, was granted the title "Royal" by Queen Victoria in 1847. Place names were less affected: in a study of Mauritian toponymy, Nuckiren Pyeneeandee found that despite 158 years of British presence most place names on the island are French.

=== Built and historical heritage ===
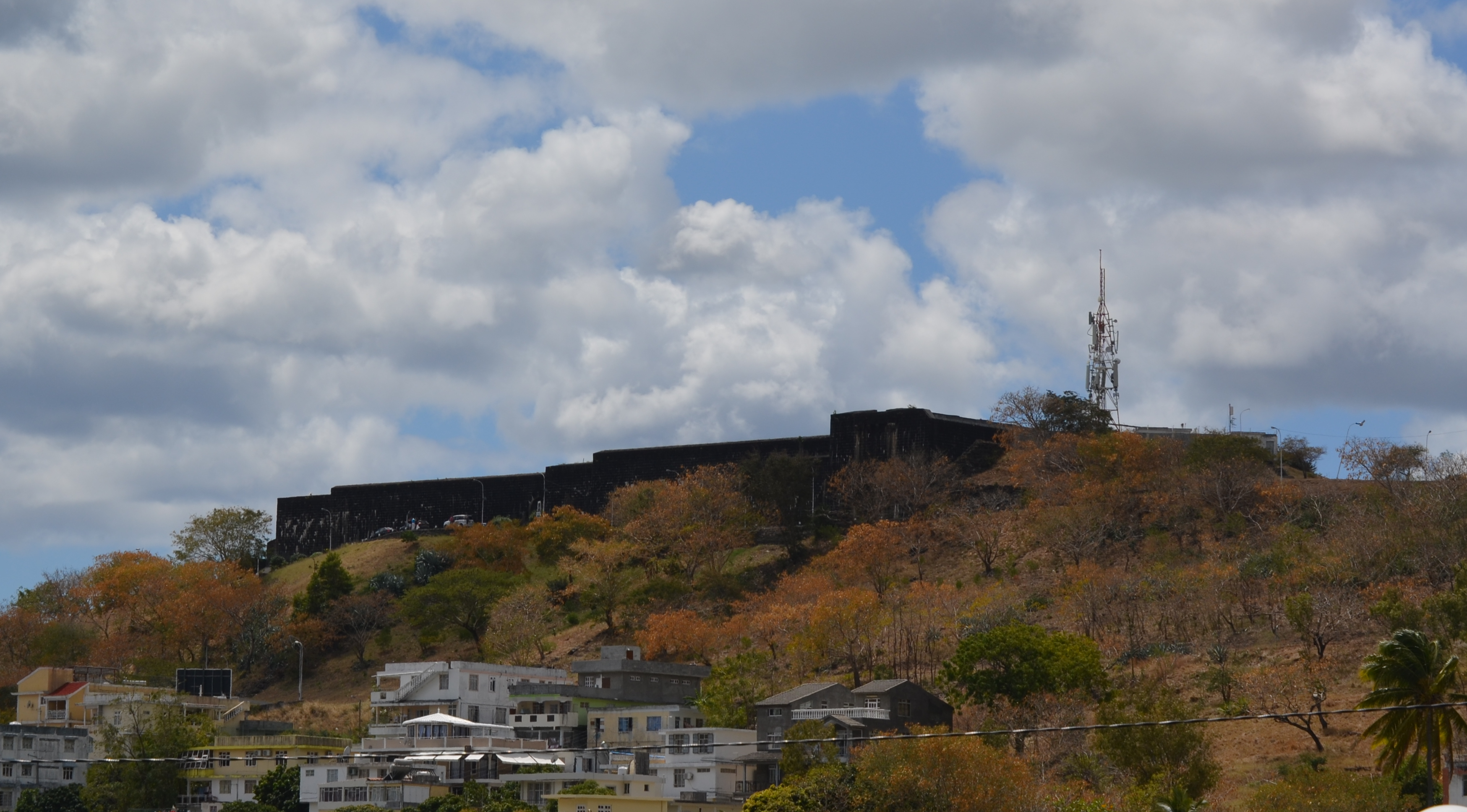
Fort Adelaide, the citadel of Port Louis (left, 2015), and the Martello tower at La Preneuse (right)

The National Heritage Fund's list of national heritage sites includes, among many others, Fort Adelaide (the Citadelle) in Port Louis, statues of Queen Victoria in the grounds of Government House and of Edward VII at the Champ de Mars, St James Cathedral, the Martello tower at La Preneuse and the Royal College in Curepipe. Fort Adelaide was built by the British on a hill overlooking the capital between 1830 and 1840 and named in honour of the wife of King William IV; it now houses shops and is used for shows and cultural events. The National Heritage Fund restored Fort Adelaide in 2017–2018, St James Cathedral in 2018–2019 and the Royal College Curepipe between 2014 and 2020, and the Martello tower at La Preneuse, a declared national monument, is run as a museum by the Friends of the Environment.

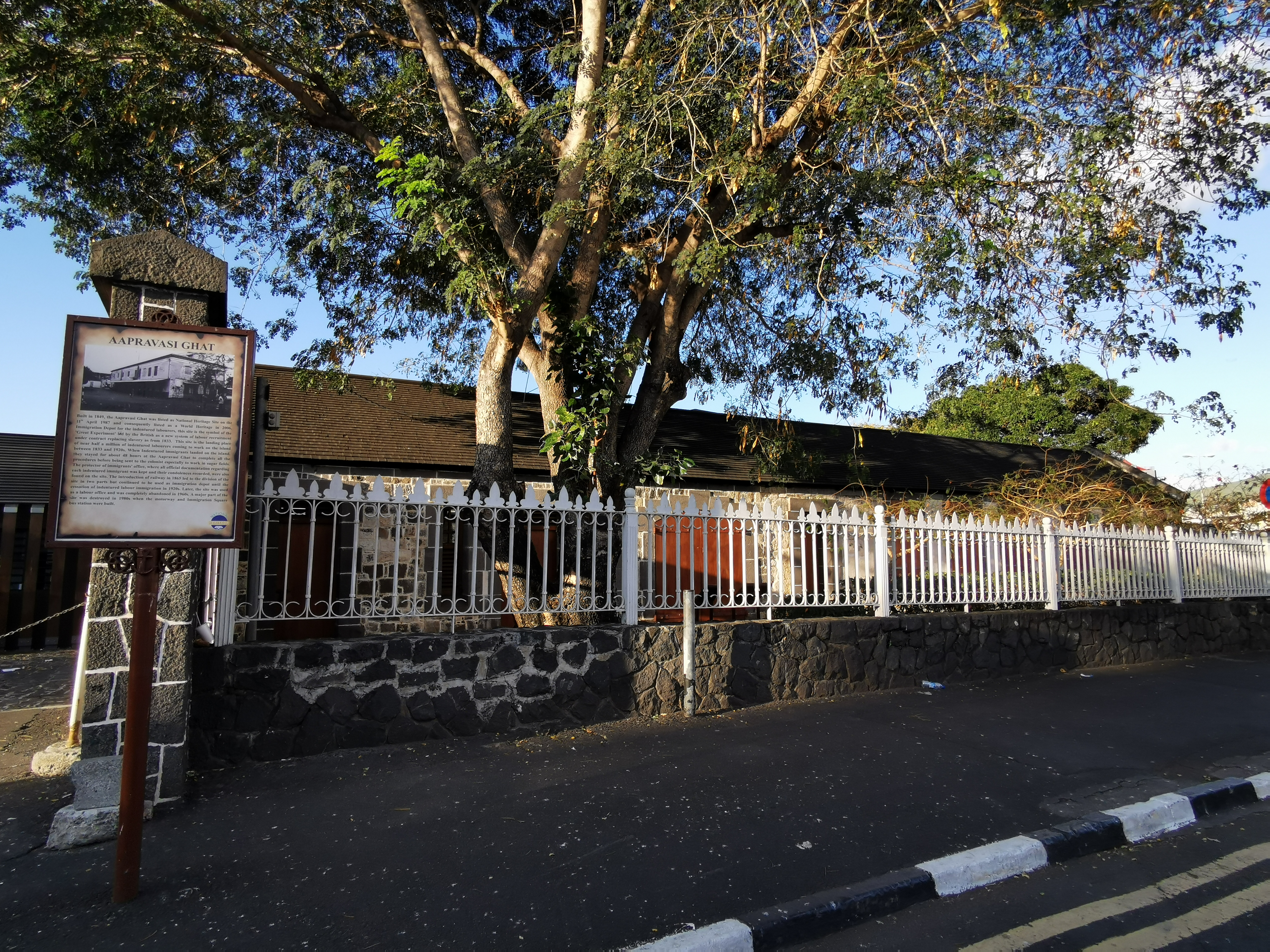
Entrance to the Aapravasi Ghat World Heritage Site, Port Louis, 2019

Two World Heritage Sites in Mauritius relate to the British period. The Aapravasi Ghat in Port Louis, inscribed by UNESCO in 2006, is "the remains of an immigration depot" built in 1849 to receive indentured labourers for the "Great Experiment" in the use of indentured rather than slave labour, which, according to UNESCO, was "initiated by the British Government, after the abolition of slavery in the British Empire"; almost half a million indentured labourers arrived there from India between 1834 and 1920. The Le Morne Cultural Landscape, inscribed in 2008, was a refuge for escaped slaves, and ICOMOS noted that "since the abolition of slavery in 1835" these maroons have "achieved a sort of legendary status".

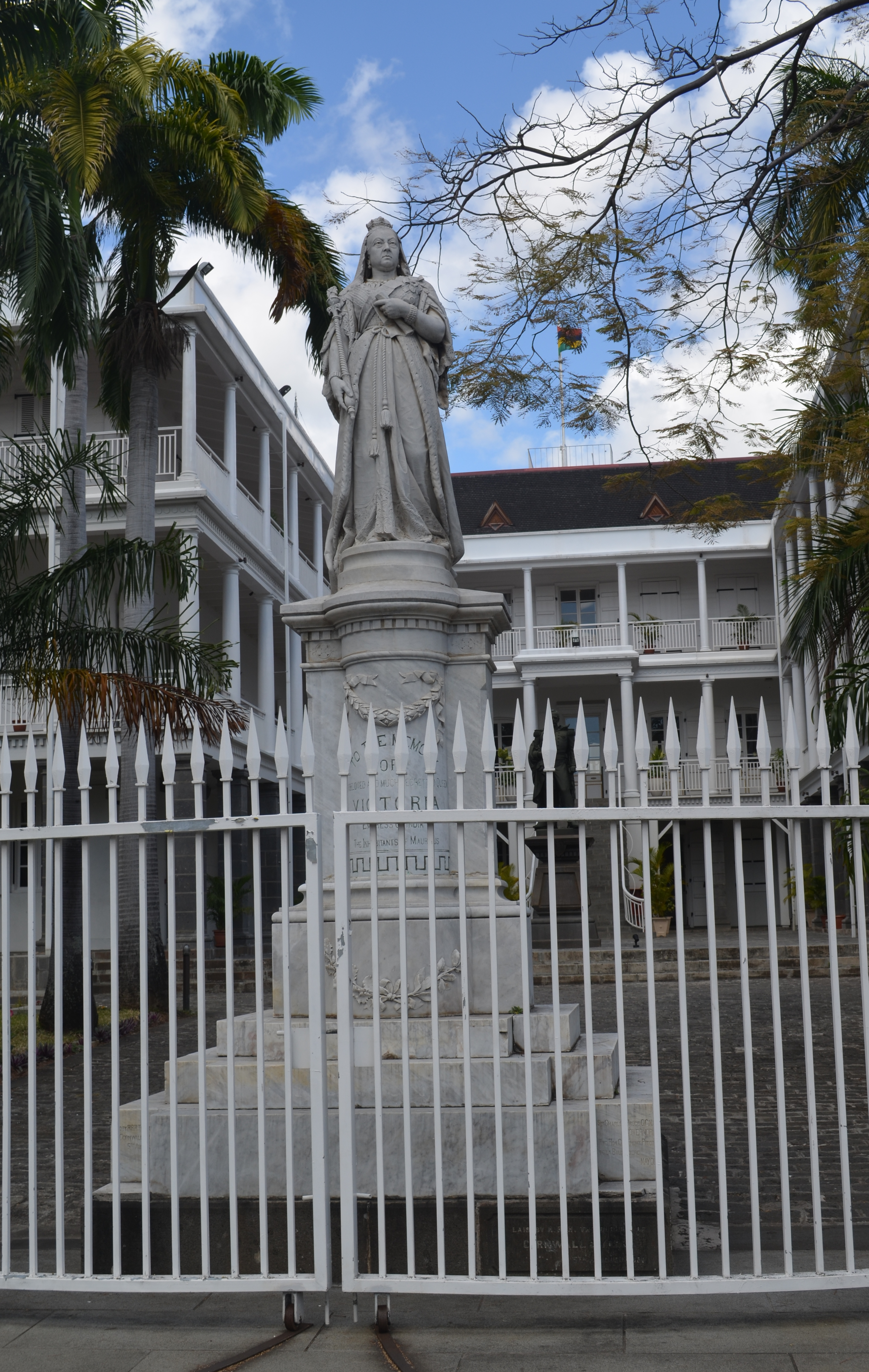
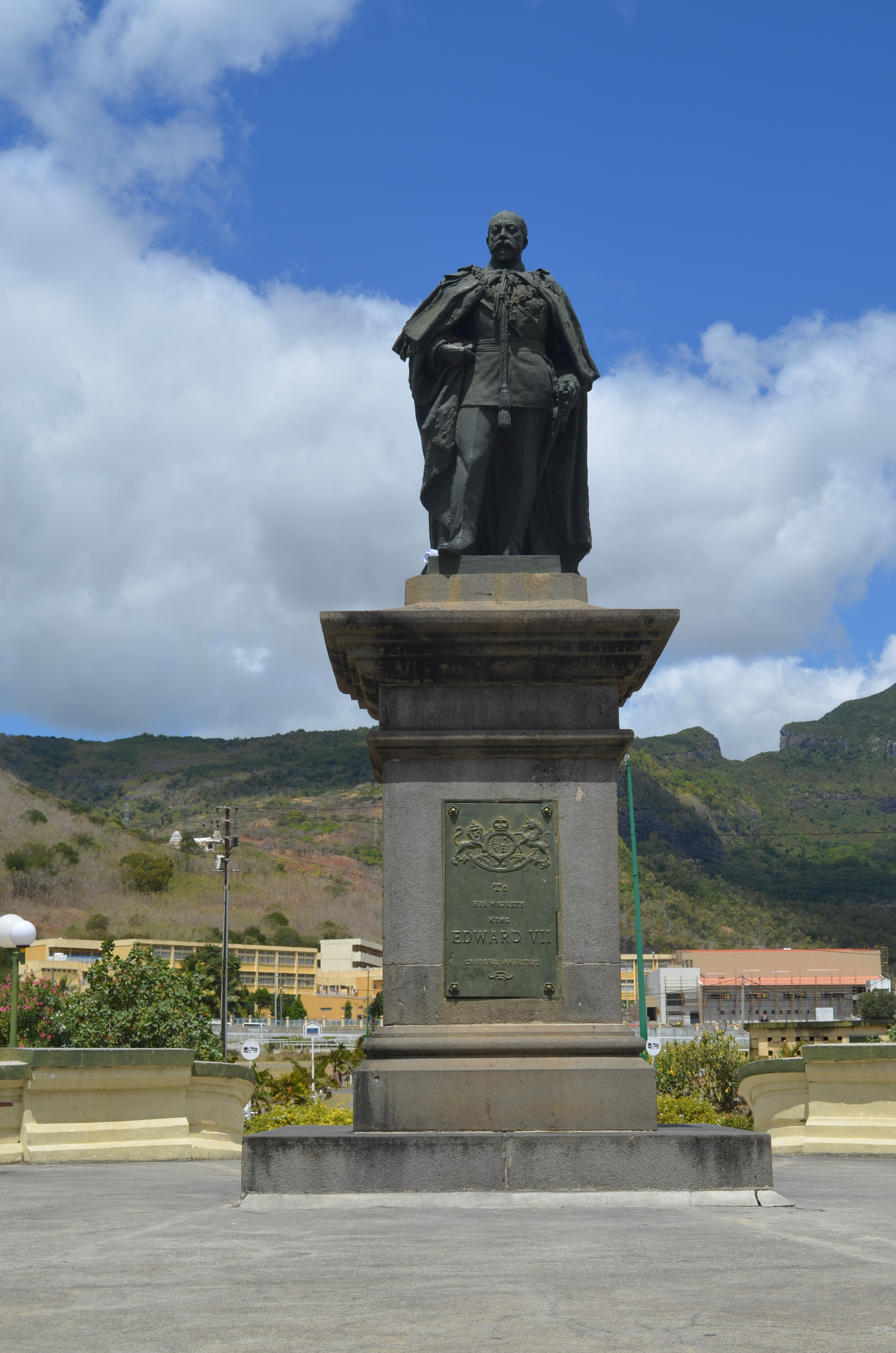
Statues of Queen Victoria (left), in front of Government House, and King Edward VII (right), at the Champ de Mars, Port Louis, 2015

The National History Museum at Mahébourg is housed in a French colonial house of about 1772, in a wing of which the wounded commanders of the English and French squadrons at the Battle of Grand Port in 1810 were treated side by side. According to the Mauritius Museums Council, "thousands of Mauritians served under the British flag during the two World Wars", and 64 died on active service in the First World War; the war memorial in front of the Royal College Curepipe, inaugurated in April 1922 on the initiative of Governor Hesketh Bell, is where the government holds the annual Remembrance Day ceremony.

=== Mauritian specimens and objects in British collections ===
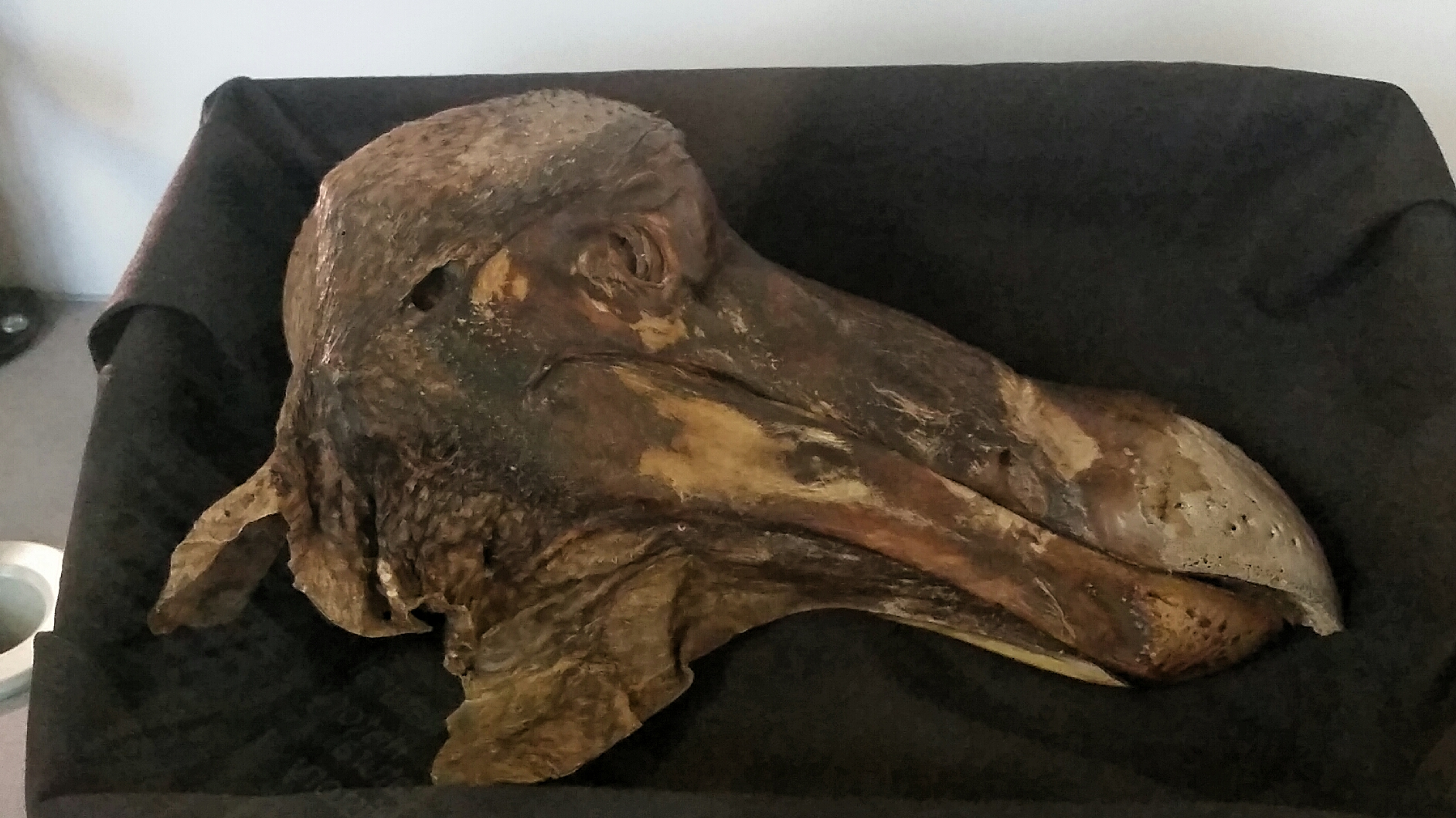
The head of the Oxford Dodo, on display at the Oxford University Museum of Natural History in 2015

The Oxford University Museum of Natural History holds the Oxford Dodo, the skull of a dodo with its skin and some feathers, together with a foot; the museum describes it as "the only example of dodo soft tissue left in the whole world". The bird is recorded in the 1656 catalogue of the Tradescants' collection at South Lambeth, near London, as "Dodar, from the Island Mauritius", and reached Oxford with Elias Ashmole's bequest in 1683; by 1755 it had decayed so far that only the head and legs were saved. It was probably acquired between 1634 and 1656, while Mauritius was in Dutch possession and more than 150 years before the British conquest of 1810. It has often been identified with a live dodo that Sir Hamon L'Estrange saw exhibited in London in about 1638, but X-ray micro-CT scanning at the University of Warwick revealed 115 metal particles in the skull, which the researchers interpreted as lead shot; they concluded that the bird had been shot in the head and that the specimen's provenance was uncertain. The Natural History Museum in London has Roelant Savery's painting of a dodo from the 1620s, which George Edwards gave to the British Museum in 1759. The Oxford museum has a 1651 dodo painting by Jan Savery, presented to the Ashmolean Museum in 1813.

Most dodo skeletons in museums are composites assembled from the bones of several birds found in the Mare aux Songes, a marsh in south-east Mauritius discovered in 1865 that has yielded thousands of dodo bones; the only two almost complete skeletons whose bones all come from a single bird are in the Mauritius Natural History Museum in Port Louis. Most of the bones now in museums came through the efforts of George Clark, a local schoolmaster, who sent enough bones for two fairly complete composite skeletons to England: one consignment went to Richard Owen at the British Museum, and another, sent through Edward Newton to his brother Alfred Newton at Cambridge, was intercepted by Owen and released to Newton only after Owen had studied and published the collection; further sets of bones were auctioned in London on 13 March 1866. The Natural History Museum holds two dodo skeletons, one of which is displayed in its Hintze Hall. The University Museum of Zoology in Cambridge has a mounted skeleton made from the bones of many birds and "an exceptional quantity of bones", sent to Alfred Newton by Edward Newton, a colonial administrator in Mauritius from 1859 to 1877; its skeleton collection is particularly rich in material from the Mascarene Islands, including many rare or extinct forms. The Oxford museum has referred to "the hundreds of bones amassed" in the London and Cambridge museums. The Grant Museum of Zoology at University College London displays two boxes of bones from the Mare aux Songes, the second of which was found in a cupboard in 2011, and bones given by Harry Pasley Higginson reached what is now World Museum in Liverpool in February 1866, part of a wider distribution of bones to museums in York and Leeds. In November 2016 a composite skeleton that a private collector had assembled from bones bought at sales over more than 40 years was sold at auction in Sussex for £346,300; CNN reported that the Mauritian government had since banned all exports of dodo bones.

In January 1879 Alfred Newton told the Zoological Society of London that he had recognised in Edinburgh's Museum of Science and Art a third known skin of the extinct Mauritius blue pigeon, besides those in Paris and Port Louis; it had come to the University of Edinburgh with the Dufresne collection in about 1816. The British Library's Tapling Collection includes an unused 2d deep blue stamp and a 1d orange-red used on cover from the 1847 "Post Office" issue, which the library has described as the "first British Colonial postage stamps"; it noted that only fourteen copies of the 1d and twelve of the 2d were known. The Colonial Office's original correspondence relating to Mauritius from 1778 to 1951, in 960 volumes, is held at The National Archives at Kew as series CO 167.

== People-to-people links ==
=== Mauritians in the United Kingdom ===
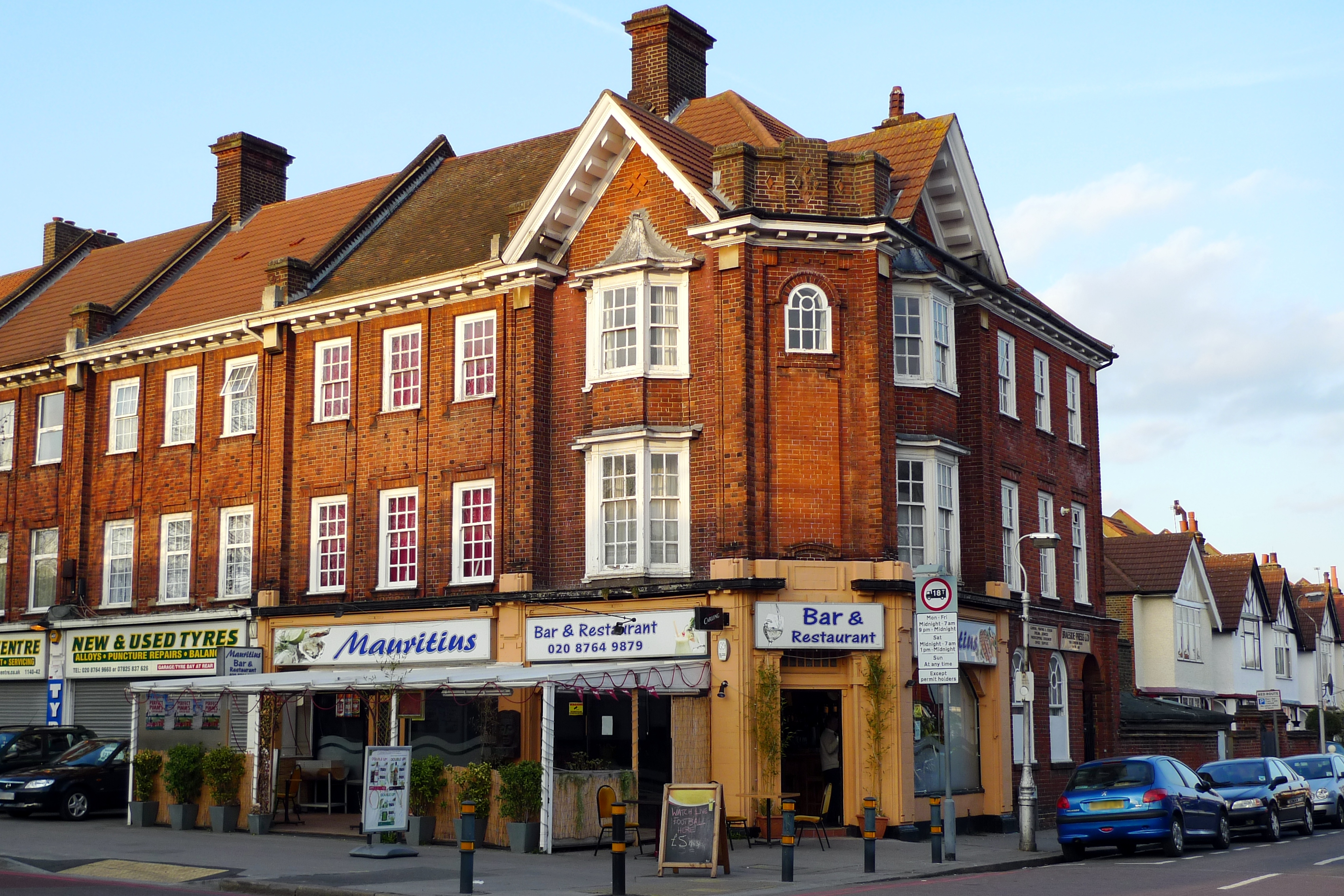
A bar and restaurant serving Mauritian food in Norbury, London, 2009

At the 2021 census, 38,862 usual residents of England and Wales had been born in Mauritius, and the census held in Northern Ireland the same year counted another 90. The Mauritius-born population of the United Kingdom had numbered 27,078 at the 2001 census and 41,978 at the 2011 census, when 41,324 lived in England and Wales, 571 in Scotland and 83 in Northern Ireland. In December 2022 the Foreign Office minister Anne-Marie Trevelyan told a Westminster Hall debate that the government was "proud of the active Mauritian diaspora in the UK, and hundreds of Mauritian students study in our universities every year".

Residents of the United Kingdom born in Mauritius, by census
| Census | Area | Born in Mauritius | Source |
|---|---|---|---|
| 2001 | United Kingdom | 27,078 | |
| 2011 | England and Wales | 41,324 | |
| 2011 | Scotland | 571 | |
| 2011 | Northern Ireland | 83 | |
| 2011 | United Kingdom (total) | 41,978 | (Note: Sum of the figures for England and Wales, Scotland and Northern Ireland.) |
| 2021 | England and Wales | 38,862 | |
| 2021 | Northern Ireland | 90 | |

Just over half of the Mauritius-born residents of England and Wales in 2021 lived in London (20,089), and most of the rest in South East England (7,572) and the East of England (4,222); in 2011 London had 23,779. The local authorities with the largest numbers were the London boroughs of Enfield (2,839) and Croydon (1,857), followed by Crawley in West Sussex (1,542) and the London boroughs of Redbridge (1,439) and Waltham Forest (1,402). The census records the year in which a person born abroad last arrived to live in the United Kingdom: of the Mauritius-born residents in 2021, 5,887 had arrived between 1961 and 1970, 6,365 between 1971 and 1980 and 11,888 between 2001 and 2010, the largest number for any decade. In a classification that counts each person once and gives priority to a British passport, 27,996 of them held a United Kingdom passport, 8,382 held a passport from a southern or eastern African country other than the four (Kenya, Somalia, South Africa and Zimbabwe) that the census lists separately, and 508 held no passport.

The chef Shelina Permalloo, whose parents emigrated from Mauritius in the 1970s "after being invited through the Commonwealth because her dad was a teacher", won the BBC's MasterChef in 2012 with food drawing on her Mauritian heritage; PA Media has described her as "the first woman of colour to win the coveted BBC One MasterChef title".

Community organisations registered with the Charity Commission for England and Wales include associations serving particular religious and linguistic groups among Mauritians, an association named after Père Laval that holds an annual Mass, and charities supporting causes in Mauritius. Among those on the register in October 2026 were:

Selected Mauritian community charities in England and Wales (Register of Charities, October 2026)
| Charity | Registered | Area of operation | Activities, as described to the regulator | Source |
|---|---|---|---|---|
| Mauritius Tamil Maha Sangam (UK) | 1990 | Throughout England | Religious events | |
| Mauritian Muslim Welfare (St Albans) Association | 1992 | Hertfordshire | Relief of poverty, education, meals for the elderly and help with bereavement | |
| Mauritian Telegu Association in the UK | 1993 | Enfield and Waltham Forest | Promoting the culture, religion and language of the Telugu community, relief of poverty and recreation | |
| Voice of Mauritius Europe | 1994 | Throughout London | Social, cultural and educational activities promoting the culture and history of Mauritius | |
| Mauritian Marathi Society | 2000 | Throughout London | Social, religious and cultural activities | |
| Père Laval Association (UK) | 2003 | Throughout London | An annual Mass and fundraising for charities in the United Kingdom and Mauritius | |
| Anglo-Mauritian Disability Link | 2003 | Throughout England; Mauritius | Welfare of disabled children in the United Kingdom and Mauritius | |
| Mauritius Hindu Association | 2007 (Note: Removed from the register in June 2011 as not operating and re-registered in July 2011.) | Throughout England and Wales; France | Social, cultural, educational and religious events | |

Chagossian organisations in Britain have included a Crawley branch of the Chagos Refugees Group and the group Chagossian Voices (see Chagossians § Campaigns and organisations). The government of Mauritius runs a Mauritian Diaspora Scheme, administered by the Economic Development Board (EDB), "to attract members of the Mauritian Diaspora back to Mauritius to participate in the economic development of the country".

The National Day of Mauritius, 12 March, marks both the anniversary of independence and that of the republic. In London the High Commission holds a reception for it: in March 2016 the High Commissioner, Girish Nunkoo, received more than 100 guests at the High Commission for the 48th anniversary of independence, mostly members of the diplomatic corps but including members of the Mauritian community in London, and the national anthems of both countries were played. His reception on 15 March 2018, for the 50th anniversary, brought together about 200 guests, among them the Commonwealth Secretary-General, representatives of British government departments, members of the House of Lords and members of the Mauritian diaspora, with the Marshal of the Diplomatic Corps, Alistair Harrison, as guest of honour and a séga performance. Guests at the reception for the 51st anniversary in 2019 included the Commonwealth Secretary-General, Patricia Scotland, and were entertained by a group of British Mauritian séga dancers. The High Commission has also held a service of prayers for the National Day at Westminster Abbey, attended by invited members of the Mauritian community, with the Mauritian flag flown over the abbey. In Scotland, the honorary consul of Mauritius and the City of Edinburgh Council held a civic reception in Edinburgh on 6 November 2018 to celebrate the 50th anniversary of independence. Diaspora groups hold their own events: on 19 March 2016 a charity evening at a hotel near Heathrow marked the anniversary with a flag-hoisting, the Mauritian national anthem and the Mauritian Achievers Awards (UK).

=== Chagossians in the United Kingdom ===
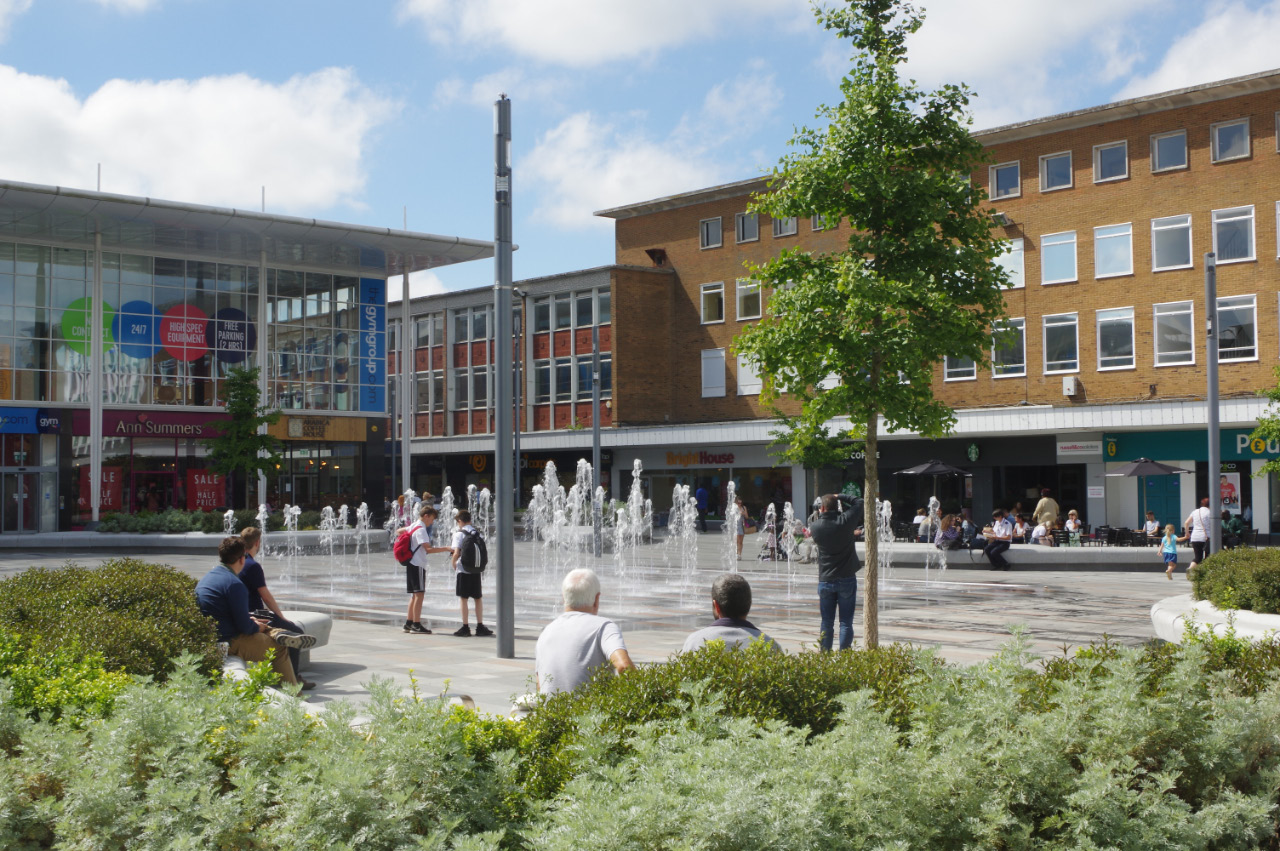
Queens Square, in the centre of Crawley, West Sussex, 2018. In 2022 the British government estimated that some 3,000 of about 10,000 Chagossians lived in the town.

People born in the Chagos Archipelago were citizens of the United Kingdom and Colonies, and most also became Mauritian citizens when Mauritius became independent in 1968. The British Overseas Territories Act 2002 made them British citizens, and many moved to Britain, above all to Crawley in West Sussex, home to an estimated two-thirds of the country's Chagossians. An initial group of 19 landed at Gatwick Airport in 2002. Since 2022 their descendants have been able to register as British citizens under the Nationality and Borders Act 2022, for which applications opened on 23 November 2022. In 2022 the British government estimated that there were about 10,000 Chagossians in the United Kingdom, Mauritius and Seychelles. Crawley Borough Council estimated in 2024 that 3,500 lived in the town alone, and a smaller community lives in Greater Manchester, notably in Wythenshawe. In April 2025, 94 per cent of Chagossians with British nationality also held Mauritian citizenship.

=== British people in Mauritius ===
Mauritius's 2022 Housing and Population Census counted 482 residents of the Republic of Mauritius with British nationality (263 men and 219 women), out of 41,855 residents who were not Mauritian citizens; 3,616 British nationals, including visitors, were present in the country on census night, 3–4 July 2022. The census asked for a country of citizenship only from people who were not Mauritian citizens. Among non-Mauritian residents, British nationals were fewer than French (1,549) and South African (1,039) nationals, and far fewer than Bangladeshi (14,934) and Indian (14,695) nationals.

Since the creation of the Integrated Resort Scheme in 2002, a series of schemes introduced under the Economic Development Board Act or by amending the Non-Citizens (Property Restriction) Act has allowed non-citizens to buy residential property in Mauritius, and an investment of US$375,000 entitles a buyer to a residence permit. In data published in June 2024, the EDB reported that British buyers made up 7 per cent of buyers under these schemes, behind French (42 per cent), South African (22 per cent) and Mauritian (9 per cent) buyers; in the early years, from 2006 to 2012, British and South African buyers favoured buying through companies.

=== Tourism and travel ===
Statistics Mauritius counts the United Kingdom among the main markets for tourism to Mauritius, together with France, which it calls "our top tourist generating country", Réunion, Germany, South Africa, India, Italy and Switzerland. In 2025, 154,990 tourists arrived from the United Kingdom, 2.0 per cent fewer than in 2024, making it the second-largest source of tourists after France (337,502) and accounting for 10.8 per cent of all arrivals.

In 2025, 55.9 per cent of British tourists arrived on direct flights from the United Kingdom.

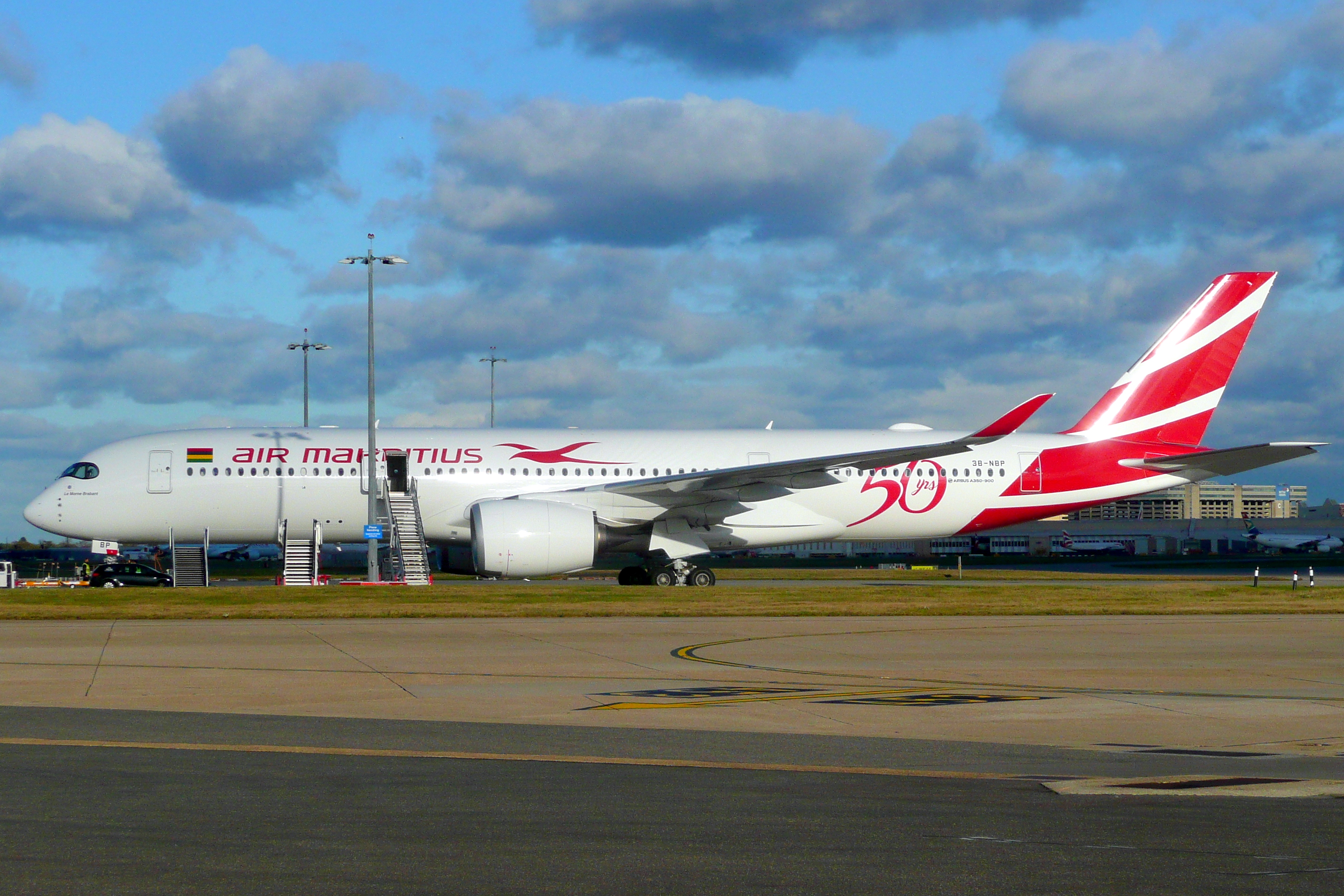
An Air Mauritius Airbus A350 at Heathrow Airport, London, 2017

Air Mauritius, which marked fifty years of operations in the United Kingdom in 2023, moved its London service from Heathrow to Gatwick on 29 October 2023 and began daily flights, described by the director of the Mauritius Tourism Promotion Authority (MTPA) as "the first direct daily flight from the UK". In January 2026 ch-aviation reported that, according to a written answer by the Mauritian prime minister to parliament, the route had lost about MUR920 million between October 2023 and March 2024, and the airline's three pairs of Heathrow slots were leased to Qatar Airways, so that it could not return to Heathrow before April 2027; the airline had cut the Gatwick service from daily to five flights a week from May 2025. The same report noted that the route competed directly with British Airways, which flew three times a week. In October 2026, after discussions with the MTPA, Air Mauritius committed to at least five weekly Gatwick flights all year, with the possibility of a daily service by 2028.

British citizens can visit Mauritius without a visa for up to 60 days and must complete the Mauritius All in One travel form before they arrive, according to British government travel advice of October 2026. Mauritius is not on the United Kingdom's visa national list; instead, its nationals have needed an electronic travel authorisation (ETA) for travel to the United Kingdom on or after 8 January 2025. An ETA allows travel to the United Kingdom for up to six months.

=== Nationality and migration links ===
Mauritius is one of the countries listed in the British Nationality Act 1981 whose citizens are Commonwealth citizens in British law. Under the Representation of the People Act 1983, a "qualifying Commonwealth citizen", one who does not need leave to enter or remain in the United Kingdom or who has such leave, may register to vote in parliamentary and local government elections where they live. British government guidance lists qualifying Commonwealth citizens among those who can vote in general elections, and Commonwealth citizens with permission to enter or stay in the United Kingdom, or who do not need it, among those who can vote in local elections in England and Northern Ireland.

=== Health workers ===
Mauritians were among the overseas nurses recruited to the National Health Service. In a Commons debate on National Health Service pay in May 1974, Willie Hamilton said that the Briggs Committee on nursing had called it "highly unsatisfactory" that Britain should in many cases "take more nurses from Mauritius, Barbados, Jamaica and elsewhere than those countries have in total themselves". Kishore Teelanah, writing in Mauritius Times in 2018, said that Mauritian nursing recruits began arriving in the 1960s and that "the number hugely increased in the 1970s"; most trained in and around London and the home counties, many of them in psychiatric nursing, and "every psychiatric hospital had many Mauritians". In 2015 the Conservative MP Suella Fernandes, later Suella Braverman, told the House of Commons that her mother "was recruited in Mauritius as a girl of 18" and had "just passed her 45th year of service as a nurse".

In June 2025, 1,312 NHS staff in England reported Mauritian nationality, out of 216 nationalities represented in the workforce; nationality in these figures is self-reported. On the register of the Nursing and Midwifery Council, which covers nurses, midwives and nursing associates, 391 people had trained in Mauritius at 31 March 2026, compared with 403 in September 2020; in the six years to March 2026, 69 people trained in Mauritius joined the register and 90 left it. The register records country of training rather than nationality. Mauritius is on neither the red nor the amber list of the code of practice for the international recruitment of health and social care personnel in England, so active recruitment from it is permitted, and it is not among the countries that the code lists as having a government-to-government agreement with the United Kingdom on health and care workforce recruitment.

== Economic relations ==
=== Trade ===
According to Statistics Mauritius, the United Kingdom took 9.7 per cent of Mauritian exports (excluding ship's stores and bunkers) in 2025, the third-largest share after South Africa (12.6 per cent) and the United States (10.5 per cent). The UK is a smaller source of Mauritian imports: in 2025 imports from the UK amounted to Rs 6,391 million out of total imports of Rs 318,962 million, and the UK was not among the six main countries of origin, which were China, the United Arab Emirates, India, South Africa, France and Germany.

The UK government's trade and investment factsheet of 24 September 2026, which also covers trade in services, put total trade in goods and services between the two countries at £2.0 billion in the four quarters to the end of March 2026, 6.4 per cent less than a year earlier; UK exports to Mauritius were £740 million and UK imports from Mauritius £1.2 billion. Mauritius was the UK's 75th-largest trading partner over that period, accounting for 0.1 per cent of UK trade. Services dominate: in the calendar year 2025 they made up £1.8 billion (88.5 per cent) of the £2.0 billion total and goods £236 million; of UK exports of £836 million, £730 million were services, and of UK imports of £1.2 billion, £1.1 billion were services. The UK's share of Mauritian imports in 2025 was 9.6 per cent for goods and services combined, 2.1 per cent for goods and 19.2 per cent for services. Around 1,200 VAT-registered British businesses exported goods to Mauritius in 2025, and around 200 imported goods from it.

In the four quarters to the end of March 2026 the leading British goods exports to Mauritius were cars (£38.4 million), beverages and tobacco (£10.3 million), medicinal and pharmaceutical products (£5.6 million), cereals (£5.5 million) and other consumer manufactures (£4.4 million). The leading goods imports from Mauritius were fish and shellfish (£71.6 million, 51.1 per cent of the total), organic chemicals (£29.4 million), sugar (£15.7 million), clothing (£10.7 million) and textile fabrics (£2.8 million).

The constitutional conference of 1965 recorded that an independent Mauritius would continue to benefit from the Commonwealth Sugar Agreement. Under the later Sugar Protocol, Mauritius had a duty-free quota of 500,000 tons for export to Europe at a guaranteed price three times the world price and became the main supplier among the African, Caribbean and Pacific countries; the protocol ended on 30 September 2009. In 2016 the Mauritian government described the UK as "the number one trading partner of Mauritius", with exports of Rs 10.7 billion in 2015, more than 55 per cent of them textiles and apparel, and said that major British retailers had been sourcing from Mauritius for 40 years.

=== Trade and investment agreements ===
Since 1 January 2021 bilateral trade has been governed by the Eastern and Southern Africa–UK Economic Partnership Agreement, a continuity agreement that replicates the interim agreement between the ESA states and the European Union. It was signed in London on 31 January 2019 by the United Kingdom, Mauritius, Seychelles and Zimbabwe; Mauritius ratified it on 21 February 2019, and it entered into force for Mauritius, Seychelles and Zimbabwe on 1 January 2021. Madagascar signed in November 2021 and Comoros in April 2022. The UK grants immediate duty-free and quota-free access to goods from the ESA states, which liberalise their own tariffs gradually. Mauritian exporters thus kept duty-free and quota-free access for all products, including sugar, tuna and garments. Shortly after the 2016 Brexit referendum, Prime Minister Anerood Jugnauth had told the National Assembly that, unless the UK maintained the existing arrangements, Mauritius would need a bilateral trade agreement with it to safeguard its interests. Talks were held in Mauritius in February 2018. A British government assessment of 2019 estimated that, without an agreement, more than half of the possible increase in annual duties on trade with the region (almost £32 million) would fall on trade with Mauritius.

The two governments announced a Strategic Trade Partnership in 2022, which was signed in Port Louis on 17 April 2023 and covered financial and professional services, waste management, the green economy, education, cyber security, pharmaceuticals, biotechnology and agricultural technology. It was succeeded on 30 July 2026 by an Enhanced Strategic Trade Partnership, focused on the green and blue economy; healthcare and life sciences; education; and financial and professional services and digital transformation, which also established a UK–Mauritius Business Forum.

The agreement for the promotion and protection of investments, signed at Port Louis on 20 May 1986, entered into force on 13 October 1986. It defines investment as "every kind of asset", including investments made before its entry into force. The Mauritian Economic Development Board lists it among the country's investment agreements in force.

Selected bilateral agreements between the United Kingdom and Mauritius
| Agreement | Signed | In force | Subject |
|---|---|---|---|
| Convention for the avoidance of double taxation | London, 11 February 1981 | 19 October 1981 | Taxes on income and capital gains |
| Protocols amending the convention | 23 October 1986; 27 March 2003; 10 January 2011; 28 February 2018 | 2003 protocol: 22 October 2003; 2011: 13 October 2011; 2018: 13 July 2018 | Successive amendments, including exchange of information (2011) and dividends (2018) |
| Agreement for the promotion and protection of investments | Port Louis, 20 May 1986 | 13 October 1986 | Investment protection |
| Air services agreement | Port Louis, 26 February 2009 | 26 February 2009 | Air transport |
| Memorandum of understanding on the transfer of suspected pirates | London, 8 June 2012 | | Prosecution in Mauritius of suspected pirates detained by the Royal Navy |
| Memorandum of understanding between the Financial Services Commission and the Financial Conduct Authority | London, 10 April 2018 | | Supervisory cooperation between regulators |
| ESA–UK Economic Partnership Agreement | London, 31 January 2019 | 1 January 2021 | Trade in goods |
| Memorandum of understanding on pharmaceuticals and biotechnology | Port Louis, 19 January 2023 | | Cooperation between the Mauritius Institute of Biotechnology and the UK Department for International Trade |
| Strategic Trade Partnership | Port Louis, 17 April 2023 | | Trade and investment in priority sectors |
| Agreement concerning the Chagos Archipelago including Diego Garcia | London and Port Louis, 22 May 2025 | Not in force (October 2026) | Sovereignty over the archipelago and the base on Diego Garcia |
| Strategic Partnership Framework | 22 May 2025 | | Growth and trade, rules-based system, maritime security, climate change |
| Enhanced Strategic Trade Partnership memorandum | Port Louis, 30 July 2026 | | Trade and investment in four priority sectors |

=== Double taxation convention ===
The convention for the avoidance of double taxation and the prevention of fiscal evasion with respect to taxes on income and capital gains was signed in London on 11 February 1981. It replaced an arrangement made in 1947, and entered into force on 19 October 1981. It was amended by protocols signed at Port Louis on 23 October 1986, 27 March 2003, 10 January 2011 and 28 February 2018; the 2003 protocol entered into force on 22 October 2003, the 2011 protocol on 13 October 2011 and the 2018 protocol on 13 July 2018.

A person is resident for the purposes of the convention if liable to tax in a state "by reason of his domicile, residence, place of management or any other criterion of a similar nature", with tie-breaker rules for individuals resident in both. Since the 2018 protocol, dividends paid by a company resident in one state to a beneficial owner resident in the other are exempt from tax in the paying company's state, except dividends paid out of income from immovable property by investment vehicles whose income from such property is exempt from tax. Interest may be taxed in both states, but is exempt in the state of source when beneficially owned by the other state's government or by a bank resident there. Tax on royalties in the state of source may not exceed 15 per cent of the gross amount. Gains from the sale of property other than immovable property, the assets of a permanent establishment, and ships and aircraft are taxable only in the seller's state of residence. The 2011 protocol replaced the exchange-of-information article with one requiring the exchange of information "foreseeably relevant" to the taxes of either state, and preventing a state from refusing information "solely because the information is held by a bank".

The convention is also modified by the Multilateral Convention to Implement Tax Treaty Related Measures to Prevent Base Erosion and Profit Shifting, which the UK ratified on 29 June 2018 and Mauritius on 18 October 2019; it entered into force for the two states on 1 October 2018 and 1 February 2020 respectively. Its provisions took effect in Mauritius for taxable periods beginning on or after 1 July 2020 (taxes withheld at source) and 1 August 2020 (other taxes), and in the UK from 1 January 2021 for taxes withheld at source, 1 April 2021 for corporation tax and 6 April 2021 for income tax and capital gains tax. The modified convention adds to its preamble an intention to avoid creating opportunities for non-taxation, including through "treaty-shopping arrangements", denies treaty benefits where obtaining them was one of the principal purposes of an arrangement, and applies mandatory binding arbitration to unresolved disputes.

=== Investment and financial services ===
Pravind Jugnauth, Prime Minister of Mauritius, speaking at the UK–Africa Investment Summit in London, 20 January 2020

At the end of 2024 the stock of British direct investment in Mauritius was £1.5 billion, 55.7 per cent higher than a year earlier, and the stock of Mauritian direct investment in the UK was £779 million, up 31.4 per cent. In July 2026 the Mauritian foreign minister, Dhananjay Ramful, said that the UK had been the largest source of foreign direct investment into Mauritius in 2025, with nearly £308 million or about 40 per cent of total gross inflows. Under the 2025 Strategic Partnership Framework, UK Export Finance committed "at least £5 billion in market risk appetite" for business in Mauritius. British International Investment, the British development finance institution, made a US$50 million commitment in December 2023 to Bank One, a Mauritian bank specialising in trade finance whose shareholders give it reach in more than ten African countries.

A British trade office opened inside the High Commission on 27 January 2015 to help British companies invest in Mauritius and Mauritian companies invest in the UK. In February and March 2016 Lord Mountevans became the first Lord Mayor of London to visit Mauritius, leading a delegation of British financial training and legal firms; he said the two countries had "similar banking, legal and insurance frameworks" and that "we both act as gateways into huge markets – Europe and Africa respectively". In January 2017 the High Commission held a conference with the Financial Services Promotion Agency and the Board of Investment on developing Mauritius as a financial technology hub for sub-Saharan Africa. The Mauritius International Arbitration Centre operated as a joint venture with the London Court of International Arbitration until 2018.

=== Mauritius as an international financial centre ===
The Mauritian international financial centre is built on global business companies, of which there were 12,616 in January 2023, with total assets estimated at US$812 billion in 2021. The British government's business guide describes the country as a "domicile of choice for structuring cross-border investment into Africa and Asia" and notes that most of its financial and legal personnel "trained in the UK". HSBC established one of the first offshore banking units in Mauritius in 1991. The Mauritian regulator, the Financial Services Commission, and the British Financial Conduct Authority signed a memorandum of understanding in London on 10 April 2018 on cooperation, exchange of information and investigative assistance in supervising firms regulated by both.

In February 2020 the Financial Action Task Force (FATF) placed Mauritius under increased monitoring for strategic deficiencies in its anti-money-laundering regime. When the UK adopted its own list of high-risk third countries on 26 March 2021, Mauritius was on it, and was therefore treated as high-risk for the purposes of enhanced customer due diligence by British firms. The FATF removed Mauritius from increased monitoring in October 2021, stating that "Mauritius is therefore no longer subject to the FATF’s increased monitoring process". The UK removed it from its list with effect from 2 November 2021, and the European Union announced its removal from the EU list in January 2022. The British High Commissioner, Charlotte Pierre, said in August 2021 that the UK had provided tangible support for the reforms, and in January 2022 the Mauritian foreign minister, Alan Ganoo, commended the UK for supporting the delisting. The 2025 Strategic Partnership Framework provided for an Economic Security Partnership "to counter corruption and illicit finance", including support for Mauritius's next FATF review, and in August 2025 the High Commissioner, Paul Brummell, reaffirmed British support for the evaluation scheduled for 2027.

The Mauritian government promotes the country as a platform for investment into Africa. According to the Economic Development Board, Mauritius trades duty-free with the other members of the Common Market for Eastern and Southern Africa free trade area and most members of the Southern African Development Community, and has been able to trade under the African Continental Free Trade Area since 1 January 2021; of the 30 investment protection agreements it lists as in force, 11 are with African states. The Financial Services Commission stated in 2019 that investment through Mauritius into Africa stood at US$36.4 billion at the end of June 2018, the largest recipients being South Africa, Nigeria and the Democratic Republic of the Congo, and argued that Mauritius had double taxation agreements with only four of the ten largest recipients. In 2016 the British government described Mauritius as "a platform for investment into India" that had begun to establish itself "as a gateway for investment into Africa". The Economic Development Board argued in 2024 that Mauritius should position itself "as the ideal platform for cross border investments" by British investors, noting that the UK had been the fourth-largest investor in Africa in 2022, and in February 2025 the British Trade Commissioner for Africa, John Humphrey, stressed the importance of Mauritius as a hub in Africa for British investors.

=== British companies in Mauritius ===
In 2023 the acting Mauritian finance minister, Soomilduth Bholah, said that British-owned firms operated in Mauritius in sectors ranging from banking, insurance and information technology to education, renewable energy, manufacturing, hospitality and real estate. A British government guide of 2016 listed HSBC, Standard Chartered, Middlesex University, the University of Central Lancashire, Aberystwyth University, Glasgow Caledonian University, HIVE Energy and Videre Global among the British organisations present.

Selected British organisations with a presence in Mauritius
| Organisation | Sector | Presence in Mauritius | Since | Source |
|---|---|---|---|---|
| HSBC | Banking | Subsidiary, HSBC Bank (Mauritius) Limited, headquartered in Ebène, offering corporate and global banking; a predecessor, the Chartered Mercantile Bank of India, London and China, opened a branch in Port Louis in 1859 and became part of HSBC in 1959 | 1859 | |
| Standard Chartered | Banking | Subsidiary, Standard Chartered Bank (Mauritius) Limited, providing commercial, corporate and institutional banking to "a select number of large multinational corporates and financial institutions" | 2002 | |
| Investec | Banking | Subsidiary, Investec Bank (Mauritius) Limited, wholly owned by Investec Bank Limited; the group has a dual-listed structure with listings in London and Johannesburg | 1997 | |
| Barclays | Banking | Former subsidiary: licensed as Barclays Bank Mauritius Limited in May 2013, renamed Absa Bank (Mauritius) Limited in February 2020 after Barclays reduced its holding in its African group to 14.9 per cent in 2017 | 2013 (until 2020) | |
| British International Investment | Development finance | Investor: US$50 million commitment to Bank One, a Mauritian trade-finance bank | 2023 | |
| Middlesex University | Higher education | Campus, Middlesex University Mauritius, on the west coast, offering courses in accounting, business, computing and law | – | |
| Cambridge International Examinations | Education | Partner of the Mauritian education ministry on curriculum and assessment | – | |
| Objectivity | Information technology | Office of a British-headquartered IT company, aiming to create 300 jobs | 2022 | |
| Crossrail International | Transport consultancy | Public body of the UK Department for Transport advising the Ministry of Land Transport on the Metro Express light rail system, with technical assistance worth about £180,000 | 2025 | |

Mauritian clothing manufacturers have long supplied British retailers; in 2016 the Mauritian government named Harrods, the Arcadia Group, Marks & Spencer, Next and River Island among their customers.

=== Tourism ===
Tourism is one of the most important sectors of the Mauritian economy, and Europe accounts for around half of its tourism and exports. British visitors are an important market: in August 2021, as Mauritius prepared to reopen its borders after the COVID-19 pandemic, the British High Commissioner said that British tourists considered Mauritius a top holiday destination and hoped to see them return. The British government noted in 2020 that the MV Wakashio oil spill could affect a tourism industry already hit by the pandemic.

== Cooperation ==
Since 2025 cooperation has been organised under the Strategic Partnership Framework, agreed by the two foreign ministers on 22 May 2025 alongside the Chagos treaty, which set four priorities: "boosting mutual economic growth and trade, strengthening the international rules-based system, reinforcing maritime security, and tackling climate change". Ministers were to review it in an annual strategic dialogue. A bilateral Security Dialogue had been established in 2022.

=== Maritime security and defence ===
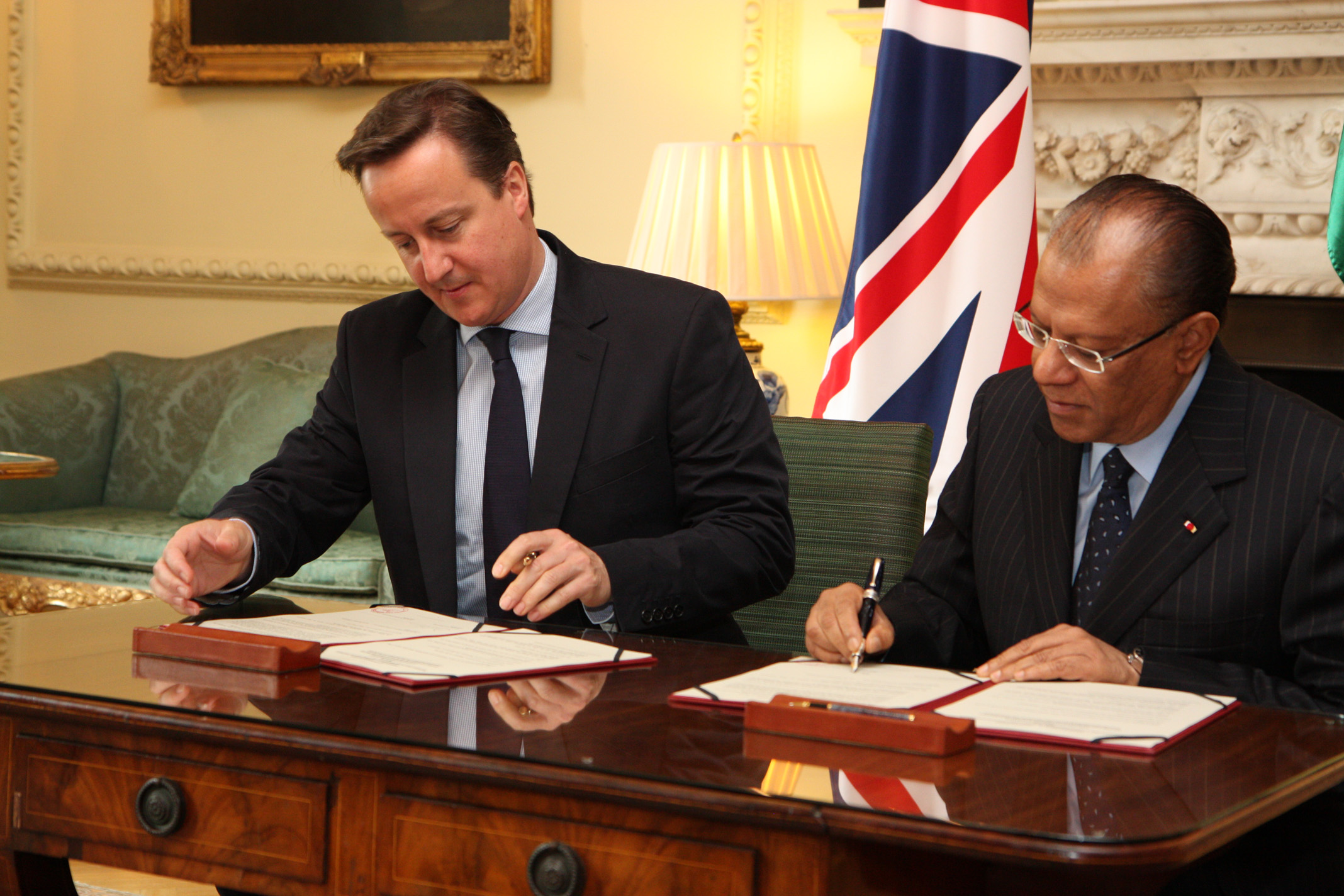
David Cameron with Navin Ramgoolam, Prime Minister of Mauritius, 8 June 2012

The 1965 constitutional conference provided for a defence agreement under which Britain would assist Mauritius with internal security and keep its facilities at HMS Mauritius and Plaisance airfield. HMS Mauritius was a land-based naval establishment; in a Commons debate on the independence bill in December 1967 the Conservative MP Patrick Wall called it "a vitally important communications centre for the Royal Navy and for the Royal Air Force". It was still operating as a signal station in 1974, and in July 1975 another Conservative MP, John Farr, criticised plans in that year's defence review for "Britain withdrawing from Mauritius" and closing the station. On 8 June 2012 Prime Minister Navin Ramgoolam and the Foreign Office minister Henry Bellingham signed in Downing Street a memorandum allowing the Royal Navy to transfer suspected pirates to Mauritius for prosecution, after similar agreements with Seychelles and Tanzania. David Cameron called it "another sign that countries in the Indian Ocean region are stepping up their efforts against piracy". Under a capacity-building package that followed, the UK donated two detection dogs to the Mauritius Police Force and Prison Service in September 2013 through the United Nations Office on Drugs and Crime's maritime crime programme. The High Commission also supplied aviation security equipment for Sir Seewoosagur Ramgoolam International Airport in 2013.

In March 2023 Ganoo thanked the Foreign Secretary, James Cleverly, for British training and capacity building in maritime and cyber security, and Cleverly said that a team would visit Mauritius for the Security Dialogue. The 2025 framework committed the two countries to cooperate against "irregular migration, drugs trafficking, piracy, and illegal, unregulated and unreported fishing", through capacity building to secure Mauritius's exclusive economic zone, consideration of patrols across the Chagos Archipelago, and training for Mauritian maritime security and fisheries protection. A British defence minister said in June 2025 that the UK's contribution would "focus on providing training and building institutional partnerships", which would also "support the future operation of the Base on Diego Garcia". In September 2025 the first Mauritian officer enrolled at the Royal College of Defence Studies in London.

The Chagos treaty of 2025, which had not entered into force by November 2026, gives the UK "full responsibility for the defence and security of Diego Garcia", requires joint decisions on installations between 12 and 24 nautical miles from the island, and commits the parties to cooperate against illegal, unreported and unregulated fishing. The British government described it as including "a strict ban on foreign security forces on the outer islands". Older Commonwealth defence ties persist through veterans: a British aid programme announced in 2018 to support 7,000 Commonwealth veterans of the British armed forces covered Mauritius, among them a Mauritian who had served with the Pioneer Corps in Egypt and Libya.

=== Law enforcement and justice ===
At the invitation of the High Commission, a British deputy chief constable and a police commander visited the Mauritius Police Force in April 2022 to identify support for its strategic plan, including in leadership, command and control, and cyber security. The 2025 framework provided for wider law enforcement cooperation, "in particular cyber training and investigations", and for support for Mauritian judicial reform. In November 2025 the High Commissioner said that the Home Office was helping the police build capacity in cybercrime, investigations and intelligence, and that the UK was working with the Financial Crimes Commission on asset recovery. The National Audit Offices of the two countries signed a technical assistance agreement in October 2024, under which the British office had trained 160 Mauritian officials.

In July 2025 Ramgoolam told the National Assembly that a planned national crime agency would be "modelled on the international best practices, notably in the United Kingdom", which had "indicated its willingness to provide substantial support", including "expert, technical and strategic advice, legislative guidance and organisational expertise". In November 2025 L'Express reported that experts from the British National Crime Agency were in Mauritius advising the Attorney-General's Office, and Brummell said that the UK was supporting the agency's creation. Nine bills to establish it in place of the Financial Crimes Commission were read a first time on 20 October 2026. The main bill requires the director-general to have "outstanding experience at senior level in some part of the Commonwealth", and makes the head of an interim agency, appointed on the Prime Minister's advice, the first holder of the post. In August 2026 Ramgoolam said that he intended to bring in a former senior Scotland Yard official for a limited period to set up the agency and train its staff before handing its leadership to Mauritians. In September L'Express reported that a former Scotland Yard executive had been interviewed and chosen; Le Défi Media quoted the government as saying that no decision had been taken, and Ramgoolam spoke of further interviews in London. The Attorney-General, Gavin Glover, was reported by the Mauritius Times as arguing that a leader from abroad without local political ties would guard against accusations of bias. Paul Bérenger of the opposition Fron Militan Progresis said that Mauritius was going against the trend in Britain, and objected that the interim head, chosen on the Prime Minister's advice, would automatically become the first director-general.

Mauritius is designated a category 2 territory under the Extradition Act 2003, with effect from 1 January 2004. Prisoners can be transferred between the two countries under the Council of Europe Convention on the Transfer of Sentenced Persons, to which Mauritius is a party. In 2015 Prime Minister Anerood Jugnauth told the National Assembly that his government planned a legal framework for arrests modelled on the British Police and Criminal Evidence Act to replace the system of provisional charges, about which the British government had raised concerns. The Judicial Committee of the Privy Council in London remains the final court of appeal for Mauritius.

=== Environment, climate and oceans ===
In 2021 the incoming British High Commissioner said of climate cooperation: "This is really a big part of the bilateral relationship here". Mauritius has taken part since 2023 in the Taskforce on Access to Climate Finance, which the UK established in 2021, and the 2025 framework included a £12 million Access to Climate Finance programme intended "to unlock hundreds of millions of pounds" from private partners and international green funds. The UK provides technical assistance to the new Mauritian Climate Finance Unit, and in July 2025 Brummell said the UK was supporting "the nation’s first Green Taxonomy and a Climate Risk Map". Earlier, in 2014, a British grant of £20,000 helped the Ministry of Environment build a carbon calculator modelled on the UK's 2050 Pathways Calculator.

The British government's Darwin Initiative has funded projects with the Mauritian Wildlife Foundation, including the reintroduction of endemic reptiles (2006–2009, £181,995) and a skills exchange across four Indian Ocean countries (2016–2019, £306,364). The Durrell Wildlife Conservation Trust, founded in Jersey, has worked in Mauritius for around 50 years, and the British High Commissioner attended talks on extending its partnership with the government in October 2026.

When the bulk carrier MV Wakashio ran aground at Pointe d'Esny in July 2020 and began leaking fuel, Prime Minister Pravind Jugnauth declared "a state of environmental emergency" on 7 August and appealed to France for help. A British oil spill expert worked with the United Nations team from the early days of the crisis, and at the Mauritian government's request the UK sent three ecologists from the Centre for Environment, Fisheries and Aquaculture Science and a marine legal expert, who flew out on 19 August 2020 to assess the damage and advise on restoration and the disposal of the wreck. The UK also gave £10,000 to the Mauritian Wildlife Foundation to protect 4,000 endemic plants moved from Île aux Aigrettes. The Africa minister, James Duddridge, said that the UK would work with Mauritius "as a friend and Commonwealth partner". The Mauritian government reported that its scientific institutions were working with experts from the International Maritime Organization, the United Nations Development Programme, the United Kingdom and Japan on long-term monitoring of the spill. In February 2024 the British prime minister, Rishi Sunak, wished Jugnauth well as Mauritius experienced the effects of Cyclone Eleanor.

The Chagos treaty commits the UK to support Mauritius in establishing and managing a marine protected area in the archipelago, on terms to be agreed separately, and the 2025 framework promised "technical expertise" for it. A British minister said in September 2025 that the UK would not make additional direct payments to Mauritius for this purpose. In October 2026 another minister told Parliament that Mauritius's review of its oil spill contingency plan after the Wakashio disaster had been one of the factors considered in negotiations on the archipelago's environmental protection.

=== Development cooperation ===
At the 1965 conference Britain agreed that an independent Mauritius would remain eligible for British economic assistance. In the decade to 2023 British bilateral official development assistance to Mauritius ranged from £193,000 (2016) to £915,000 (2023) a year. It has been delivered mainly through small grants managed by the High Commission, such as an International Programme Fund for projects of up to Rs 850,000 on women and girls, climate, governance, trade and health, and regional programmes such as the Southern Africa Prosperity Fund. Other projects included a 2013 agreement with Remploy on employment for disabled people, a 2019 guide to the rights of migrant workers in six languages, and, since 2022, bursaries for Chagossians to study at Middlesex University Mauritius.

Since August 2025 the Foreign Office has helped Mauritius prepare to implement the digital trade protocol of the African Continental Free Trade Area. Crossrail International has advised on the operation of the Metro Express under the UK's Green Cities, Infrastructure and Energy Programme, and the British Department for Transport has worked with the Mauritian Civil Aviation Authority on safety and security. Under the Chagos treaty, if it enters into force, the UK would also pay a grant of £45 million a year for 25 years for projects promoting the economic development of Mauritius.

=== Health and COVID-19 ===
In April 2012 University College London signed a memorandum with the Ministry of Health on joint research, training and the prevention of diabetes and cardiovascular disease. In September 2024 the ministry signed an agreement with King's College Hospital NHS Foundation Trust for an assessment of the Dr A. G. Jeetoo Hospital in Port Louis, which the British High Commissioner described as the result of months of close collaboration between the two governments. The 2025 framework provided for government-to-government initiatives on health and for partnerships with hospitals. In 2022 the British minister Lord Ahmad said that some 1,300 Mauritians worked in the National Health Service.

During the COVID-19 pandemic Mauritius restricted the entry of foreign passengers from the European Union and the UK from 18 March 2020, and in December 2020, after the detection of a new variant, barred passengers from England, Scotland and Wales until the end of the year. The UK in turn banned entry to travellers from Mauritius, other than British and Irish nationals and residents, from 9 January 2021, because of the variant prevalent in southern Africa, and removed Mauritius from England's "red list" from 19 March 2021. From January 2021 Mauritian samples were sequenced at the Francis Crick Institute in London to track variants. In June 2020 the High Commission opened a fund for local projects addressing the economic and social effects of the pandemic.

The UK donated 211,200 doses of the Pfizer paediatric vaccine, handed over on 11 May 2022, which allowed Mauritius to vaccinate children aged five to eleven. Ganoo thanked the UK for this donation, for earlier supplies of personal protective equipment and for its participation in the COVAX facility, from which Mauritius had benefited. On 27 October 2022 the UK handed over a further 500,000 items of protective equipment, and the health minister, Kailesh Jagutpal, commended the UK's support during the pandemic.

=== Education, science and culture ===
In 2025 the education minister sought British help in reforming the curriculum, including a visit to Cambridge International.

Research partnerships extend beyond health to biotechnology: in January 2023 the Mauritius Institute of Biotechnology and the UK Department for International Trade signed a memorandum on developing pharmaceutical manufacturing, including vaccines. The British Council and the High Commission marked the 400th anniversary of Shakespeare's death with a programme in Mauritius, including performances of Hamlet by Shakespeare's Globe in January 2016, and the British Council has since worked on the circular economy.

=== Multilateral cooperation ===
The 2025 framework committed the two countries to closer collaboration "in international and multilateral fora such as the Commonwealth and regional Indian Ocean organisations".

==== Commonwealth ====
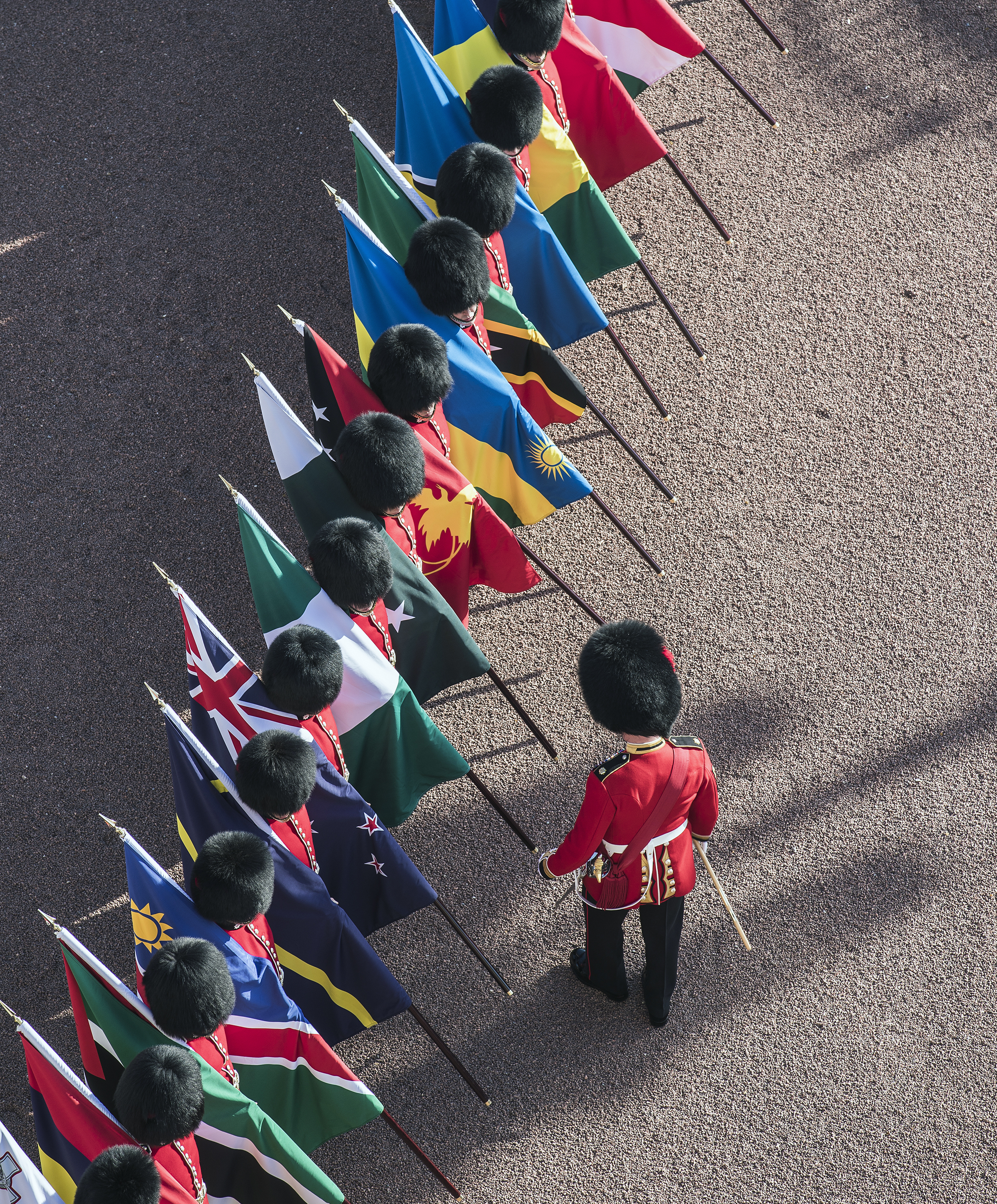
Coldstream Guards flag bearers with the flags of the 53 Commonwealth nations in the forecourt of Buckingham Palace during the 2018 Commonwealth Heads of Government Meeting, 19 April 2018

Mauritius joined the Commonwealth of Nations in 1968, on independence from Britain. British ministers have described it as a "Commonwealth partner". In November 2013 Prime Minister Navin Ramgoolam stayed away from the Commonwealth Heads of Government Meeting in Colombo over Sri Lanka's human rights record. Because convention required the next host's leader to attend, Mauritius rescinded its offer to host the 2015 meeting, and the heads of government chose Malta instead. Ramgoolam's successor, Pravind Jugnauth, attended the meetings in London in April 2018 and in Kigali in June 2022. Mauritius hosts the Commonwealth Climate Finance Access Hub, which Lord Ahmad commended in 2022, and co-champions, with Australia and Belize, the Commonwealth Blue Charter action group on coral reef protection. It also hosted the Commonwealth Law Ministers Meeting in November 2022.

==== United Nations ====
In March 2015 the British High Commissioner signed in Port Louis the UN convention on transparency in investor–state arbitration, thanking Mauritius "for its international leadership in both driving this Convention forward and hosting its signing". In 2021 the two governments said they would work with the Security Council and the wider international community on Afghanistan, and in 2023 Cleverly thanked Mauritius for its principled position at the General Assembly on Russia's invasion of Ukraine. At Mauritius's Universal Periodic Review in the Human Rights Council in January 2024 the UK welcomed "the broad progress Mauritius has made on human rights", while recommending further reforms. The two states have nevertheless been on opposite sides at the UN over the Chagos Archipelago: the UK asked for the 2017 draft resolution seeking an advisory opinion of the International Court of Justice to be withdrawn and voted against resolution 73/295 in 2019. In November 2019 Jugnauth said that the UK's rejection of the advisory opinion left it "an illegal colonial occupier".

== Mauritius as a partner: strategic assets and priorities ==
The Mauritian government and its investment agency, the Economic Development Board (EDB), promote Mauritius to investors for its location, maritime zones, financial centre, education sector and workforce, and British officials have described it in similar terms.

=== Strategic location ===
Mauritius lies in the south-west Indian Ocean, about 2,400 km from the south-east coast of Africa. The EDB says that it is often called the "Star and Key of the Indian Ocean", the "Star" referring to its "strategic location on the network of air and sea routes between Asia, Europe and Africa". Bhavna Mahadew, a law lecturer at the University of Technology, Mauritius, wrote in 2026 of its "strategic location along key maritime routes connecting Africa, Asia, and the Middle East".

Mauritius hosted ministerial conferences on maritime security in the western Indian Ocean in 2018 and 2023, the latter the third in the series, and is one of seven states in a maritime security architecture set up by the Indian Ocean Commission with European Union funding. The commission reported in 2023 that the architecture's centres in Madagascar and Seychelles had carried out joint operations "in close collaboration with various partners such as Operation EUNAVFOR - Atalanta and the British Naval Forces". In October 2024 the two governments called themselves "close Commonwealth partners committed to the security and prosperity of the Indian Ocean Region".

Mauritius joined the Organisation of African Unity, predecessor of the African Union, in 1968, and in 1995 became the first island state in the Southern African Development Community; it is also a member of the Common Market for Eastern and Southern Africa (COMESA). It has belonged to the Indian Ocean Rim Association since 1997 and hosts its secretariat, and it is a member of the Indian Ocean Commission, whose general secretariat has been in Ebène since 2012. The United Kingdom has been a dialogue partner of the Indian Ocean Rim Association since 2000.

=== Exclusive economic zone and ocean economy ===
The EDB describes Mauritius as "surrounded by a vast Exclusive Economic Zone of 2.3 million square kilometers", without saying which islands the figure covers. The Maritime Zones (EEZ Outer Limit Lines) Regulations 2024 define one exclusive economic zone around Mauritius, Rodrigues, Cargados Carajos, Agaléga and Tromelin and another around the Chagos Archipelago. The British government's 2016 export guide put the zone at 1.9 million km², with a continental shelf of around 396,000 km² "co-managed with the Republic of Seychelles". After a joint submission to the Commission on the Limits of the Continental Shelf in 2008, the two countries agreed, by treaties in force since June 2012, to exercise their sovereign rights over the shelf in the Mascarene Plateau region jointly and to manage it together. In 2016 the British High Commissioner to Seychelles called the area "the world's first Joint Management Area".

The Government Programme 2025–2029 says that Mauritius "is positioning itself as a Large Ocean State" and promises to revive the ocean economy strategy of a 2013 roadmap. According to the EDB, blue economy activities other than coastal tourism provide 10.3 per cent of GDP and around 10,000 jobs, and the government aims to raise that share to 20 per cent. The UK's 2026 strategy for small island developing states records British support for pre-feasibility studies for 100 MW of offshore wind in Mauritius.

=== Financial services and investment platform ===
The EDB markets Mauritius as "the ideal business and investment hub for Africa" and says that its international financial centre is "well poised to play a crucial role to attract investment and promoting prosperity for and across Africa". In October 2024 an EDB-led delegation that included the Financial Services Commission promoted the centre to investors in London at the Africa Financial Services Investment Conference. The Mauritius Chamber of Commerce and Industry and the British High Commission agreed in October 2023 to set up a Joint Business Council. In August 2025 the British High Commissioner discussed with the financial services minister the government's new Financial Services Strategy, which "seeks to position Mauritius as a trusted and innovative international financial centre".

The British government's market guide says that Mauritius "has embraced the highest standards of international practice", and the EDB describes "a sophisticated, transparent and well-regulated international financial centre". The Financial Services Commission, the non-bank regulator, signed the multilateral memorandum on information exchange of the International Organization of Securities Commissions in 2012. According to the commission, the OECD's Global Forum on Transparency and Exchange of Information for Tax Purposes upgraded Mauritius in 2017 from "Largely Compliant" to "Compliant" with its standard on the exchange of tax information on request. In 2022 the Eastern and Southern Africa Anti-Money Laundering Group rated Mauritius's technical compliance with the Financial Action Task Force's 40 recommendations as compliant on 26 and largely compliant on the other 14, while keeping it in enhanced follow-up.

=== Education hub ===
In March 2014 the Mauritian Board of Investment held a Mauritius International Knowledge Investment Forum in London to discuss, in the British High Commission's words, "how Mauritius is positioning itself as the education hub of Africa", choosing London because of British universities' interest in setting up campuses there. The Government Programme 2025–2029 says that the government "is determined to position Mauritius as a global education hub in order to attract international students". The EDB says that Mauritius "is positioning itself to become an Education Hub for the Asian, African and Australian region", and the government funds scholarships for students from African Union and African Commonwealth states at Mauritian public institutions.

The Higher Education Commission counted 3,020 international students from about 72 countries in December 2022, against 596 in 2010; 54.6 per cent came from Africa, led by Nigeria, Madagascar and Zimbabwe, and India was the largest single source.

In 2014 the British Africa minister, Mark Simmonds, said that the two countries were "helping students from across Africa to enjoy a world-class British education in Mauritius". The British government's 2023 business guide says that Mauritius "is also establishing itself as a knowledge hub for Africa", and positioning Mauritius "as the regional education hub of Africa" was discussed by the British High Commissioner and the financial services minister in August 2025.

=== Skilled workforce and cultural affinity ===
In 2025 the Mauritian labour force, which excludes foreign workers, numbered 587,200, and 160,900 of the 553,700 people in work held tertiary qualifications. According to the EDB, the "local labour force is bilingual, often trilingual with English and French being the main languages used together with the native creole", and literacy is about 93 per cent. The British government's business guide notes that Mauritius "benefits from a bi-lingual French/ English workforce", and its 2016 export guide counted a "common language and historical ties (multilingual workforce)" among the attractions for British exporters. The EDB calls Mauritius "an established location for global services delivery thanks to its quality, multilingual workforce", with an ICT and business process outsourcing industry employing more than 33,000 people, and cites "a pool of bilingual professionals" for maritime services. Both British guides also report shortages of qualified staff in some sectors, including IT.

The EDB includes British-derived institutions in its pitch to investors, citing a "hybrid legal system" drawing on the Napoleonic Code and British common law, the right of appeal to the Judicial Committee of the Privy Council and a "Westminster-inspired political system". English is the official language of the National Assembly and the courts, and secondary pupils sit Cambridge examinations.

=== A bridge between Africa and the world ===
At the Third India–Africa Forum Summit in 2015 the prime minister, Anerood Jugnauth, announced an Africa strategy of "becoming a natural bridge between Asia and Africa, through our membership to COMESA, SADC and the Indian Ocean Commission". The EDB refers to "a geostrategic location that serves as a bridge linking Asia, Africa and Australia" and calls the country "a global strategic location, bridging the gap between Europe and Africa".

The British government's 2023 business guide says that Mauritius "is positioning itself as a regional hub for investment into Africa". According to the Government Information Service, the High Commissioner, Paul Brummell, described Mauritius in July 2026 as "a dynamic hub for business, finance, innovation, and connectivity" and said that the UK wanted the new trade partnership to position it "as a stable, strategically located partner for British enterprises".

== Significance of the relationship ==
The 2025 communiqué spoke of "deep historical ties and strong partnerships across a full range of shared strategic interests including economic growth, security, and climate change". In 2023 Rishi Sunak and Jugnauth "reflected on the strong and historic relationship between the UK and Mauritius, as close Commonwealth partners", and in September 2026 Andy Burnham noted "the clear benefits the two countries could bring to each other". In July 2025 Ramful said that the two countries spoke with one voice on sovereignty, security, development, climate and prosperity. David Snoxell, British High Commissioner from 2000 to 2004, said that Mauritius had much closer relations with France, "the UK to a slightly lesser extent", India and Australia than with China.

=== Benefits to Mauritius ===
For Mauritius the UK is a leading export market, the destination of 9.7 per cent of its exports in 2025, and its main export to Britain, fish and shellfish, enters free of duty under the economic partnership agreement. Ramful described the UK in 2026 as Mauritius's largest source of foreign direct investment, and presented Mauritius as a trusted gateway connecting international investors with fast-growing markets. Mauritian ministers have credited British help for the removal of Mauritius from the FATF grey list, for vaccines during the COVID-19 pandemic and for climate finance. The finance minister, Renganaden Padayachy, said in 2023 that the UK had been a key partner in establishing new and innovative industries in Mauritius. Mauritians study for British qualifications through scholarships and locally taught programmes, and the British government notes that most Mauritian financial and legal personnel trained in the UK.

=== Benefits to the United Kingdom ===
For the UK the relationship bears on the joint UK–US base on Diego Garcia: under the 2025 treaty Mauritius, as sovereign, would authorise the UK to exercise its rights over Diego Garcia for an initial 99 years. The Defence Secretary, John Healey, told Parliament that Diego Garcia was "one of just four locations in the world to operate ground station antennas for the Global Positioning System", and that "two-thirds of global oil shipments" passed through the Indian Ocean. The Australian analyst David Brewster wrote in 2019 that the base was "the foundation stone of the US presence in the Indian Ocean region". British ministers present maritime security cooperation with Mauritius as supporting the base's future operation.

Economically, Mauritius bought £836 million of British goods and services in 2025, of which £730 million were services, although the UK ran a deficit of £375 million in its trade with Mauritius. British investors held £1.5 billion of direct investment there at the end of 2024. In 2016 Lord Mountevans said that "the UK is the natural trading partner for Mauritius", and British officials have described the island as a hub for British investment in Africa. Education is another export: in 2014 the British government valued the presence of more than 25 British awarding bodies and three satellite campuses in Mauritius at £7 million. Mauritians also contribute to the British workforce, including some 1,300 in the National Health Service according to Lord Ahmad. Diplomatically, the British government has thanked Mauritius for its position at the UN on Russia's invasion of Ukraine, and the 2012 piracy memorandum allowed the Royal Navy to transfer suspected pirates to Mauritius for prosecution. Brummell described Mauritius in 2025 as a big ocean state and a beacon in the region in tackling climate change.

== Gallery ==
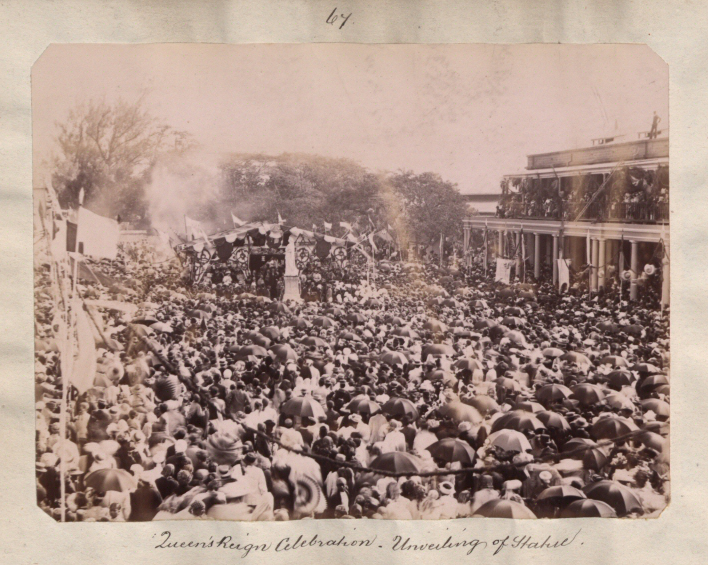
Unveiling of the statue of Queen Victoria in front of the Central Railway Station, Port Louis, during the celebrations of the Queen's reign, 22 June 1897

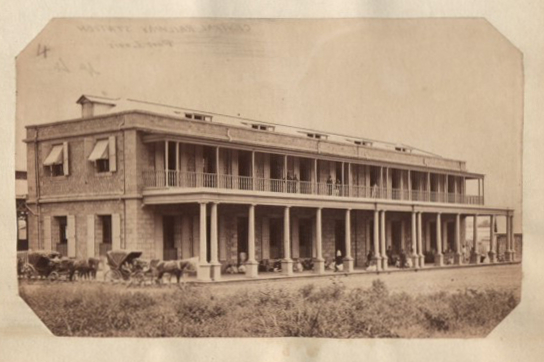
The Central Railway Station, Port Louis, between 1880 and 1899

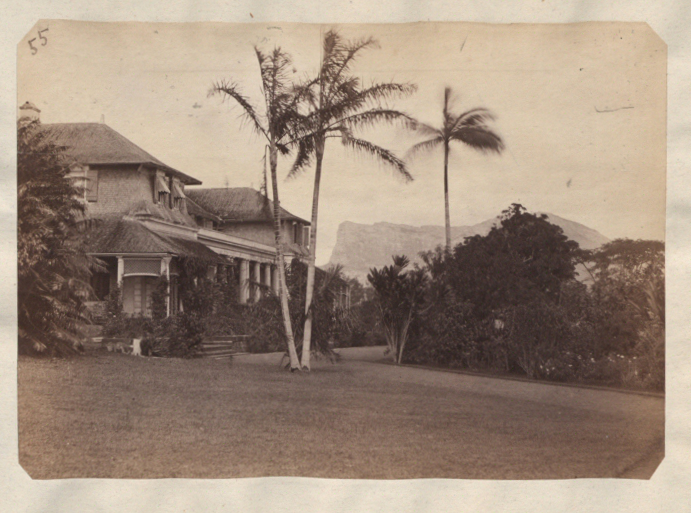
Le Réduit, the Governor's country residence, between 1880 and 1899

Port Louis from the Champ de Mars, an aquatint by John Heaviside Clark after Richard Temple, published in 1813

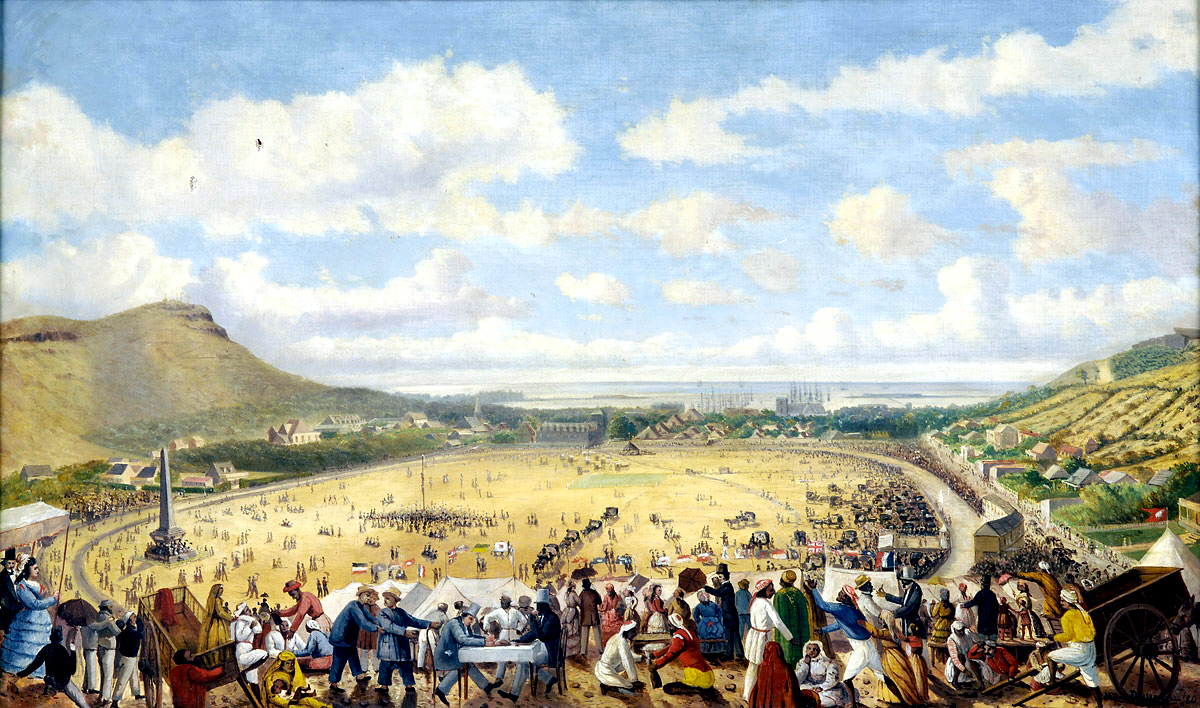
The Champ de Mars, Port Louis, an oil painting by Numa Desjardins, 1880

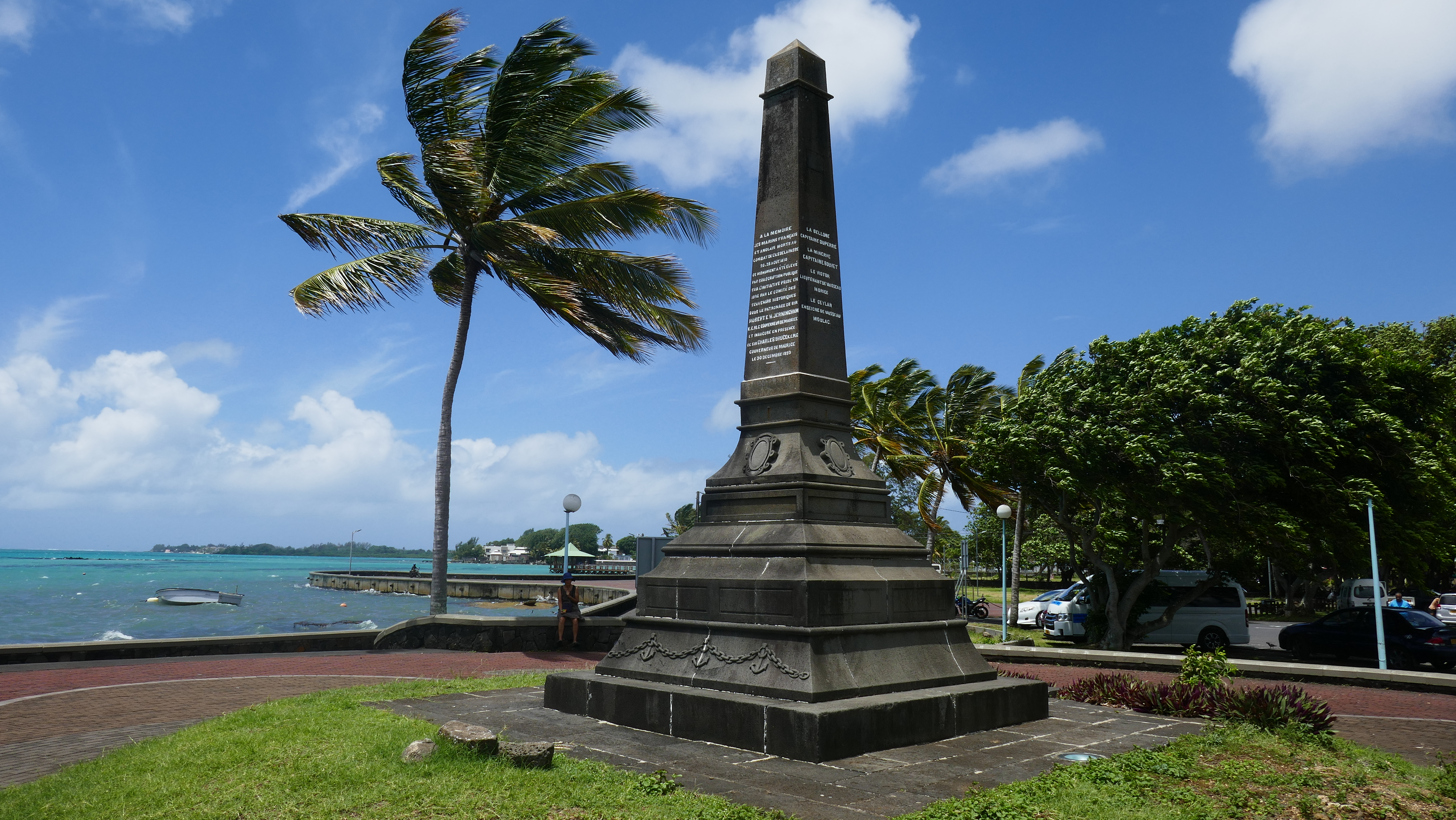
Memorial to the Battle of Grand Port of August 1810, Mahébourg, 2023

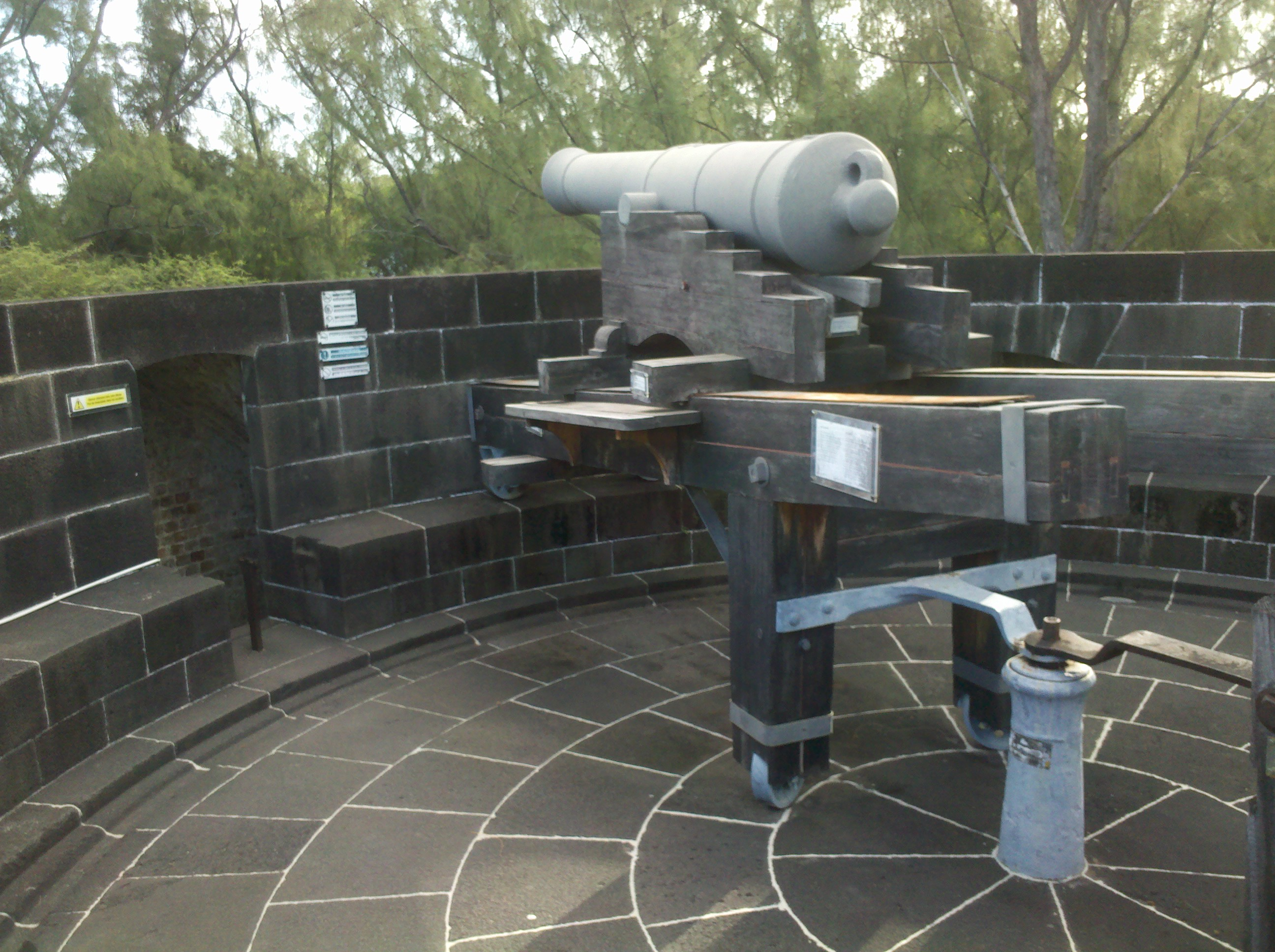
Cannon on top of the Martello tower at La Preneuse, 2014

Interior of St James Cathedral, Port Louis, 2015

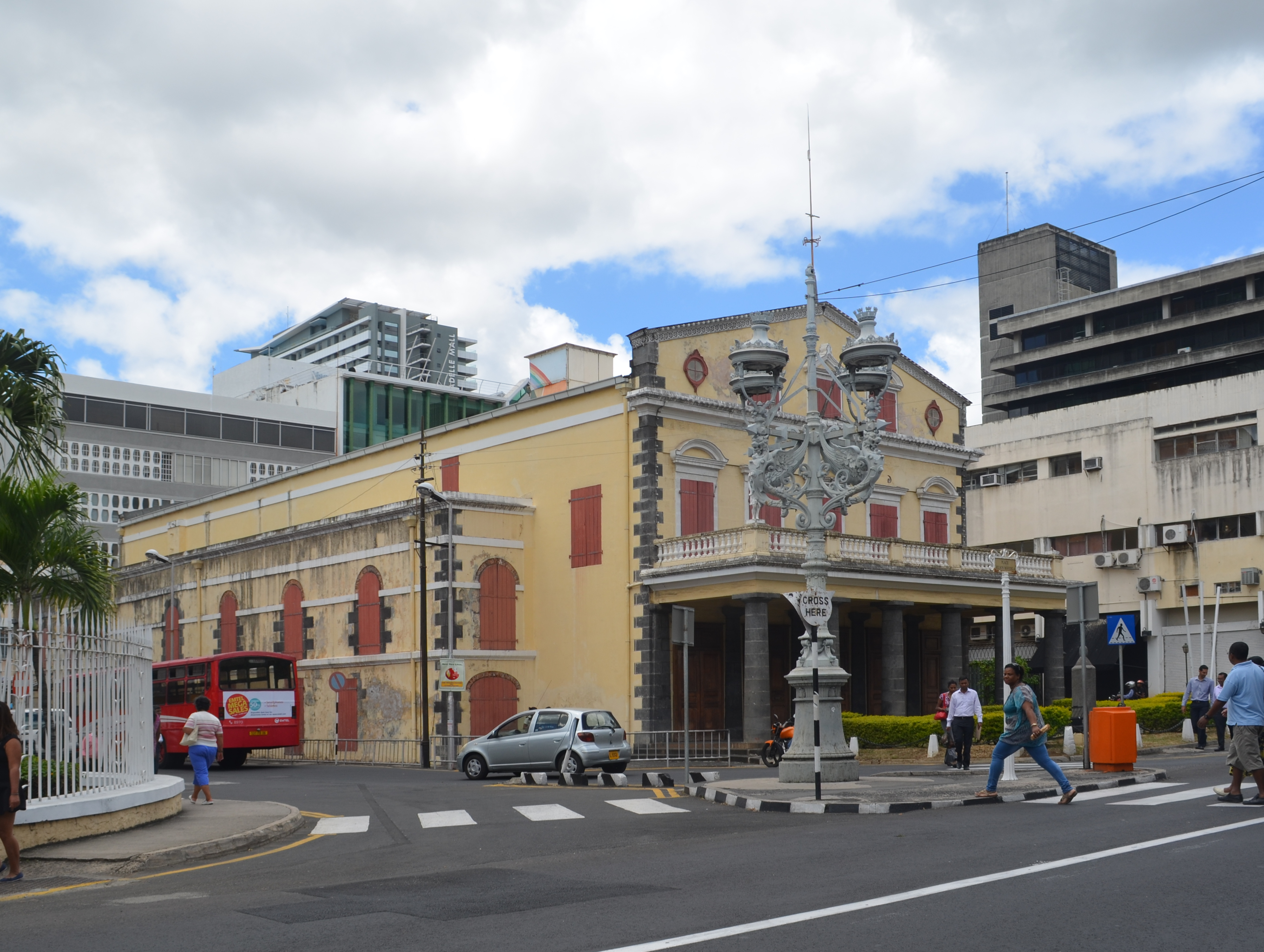
The Port Louis Theatre, 2015

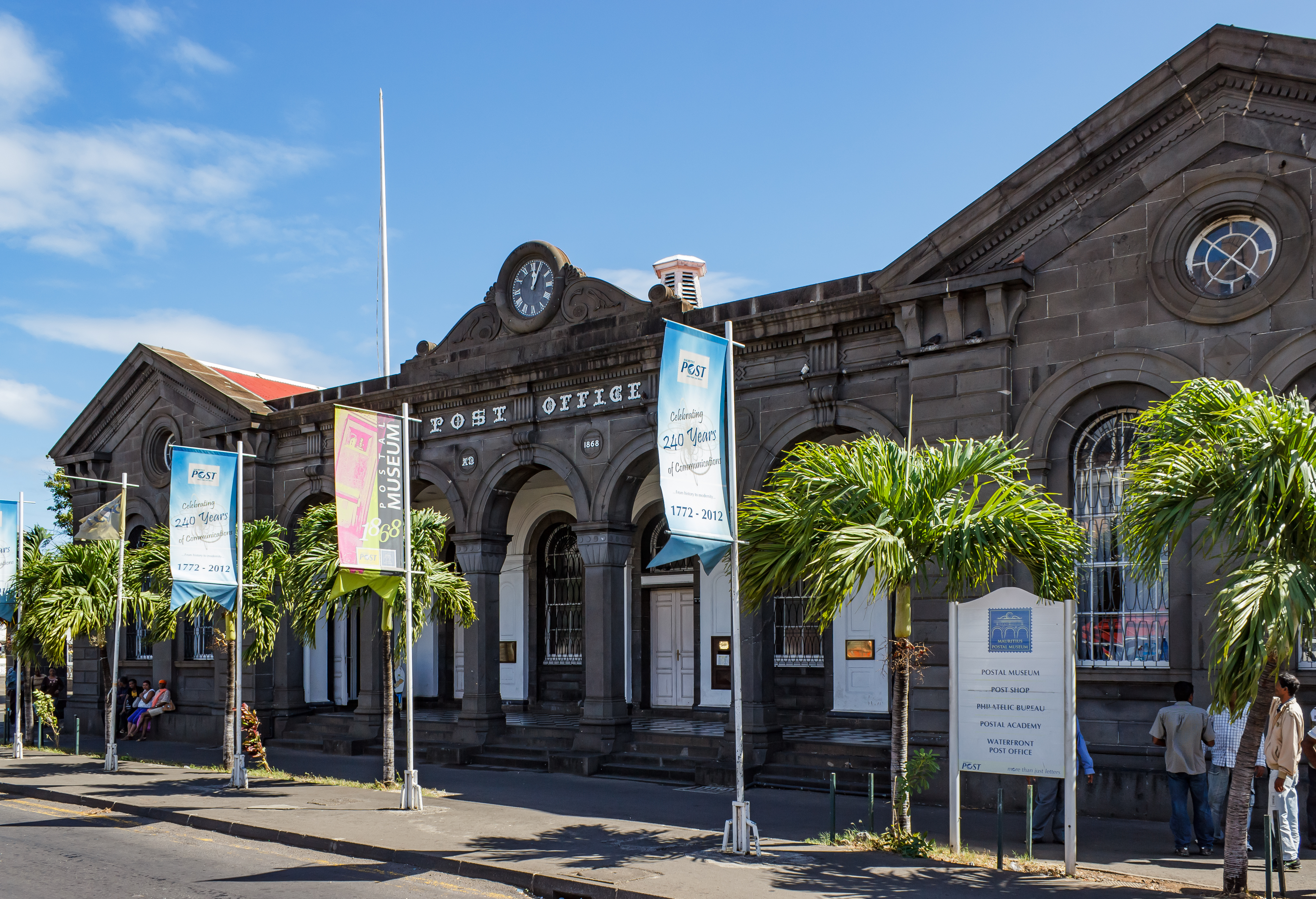
The old post office in Port Louis, now part of the Mauritius Postal Museum, 2013

Historic letter boxes on display in the Mauritius Postal Museum, 2013

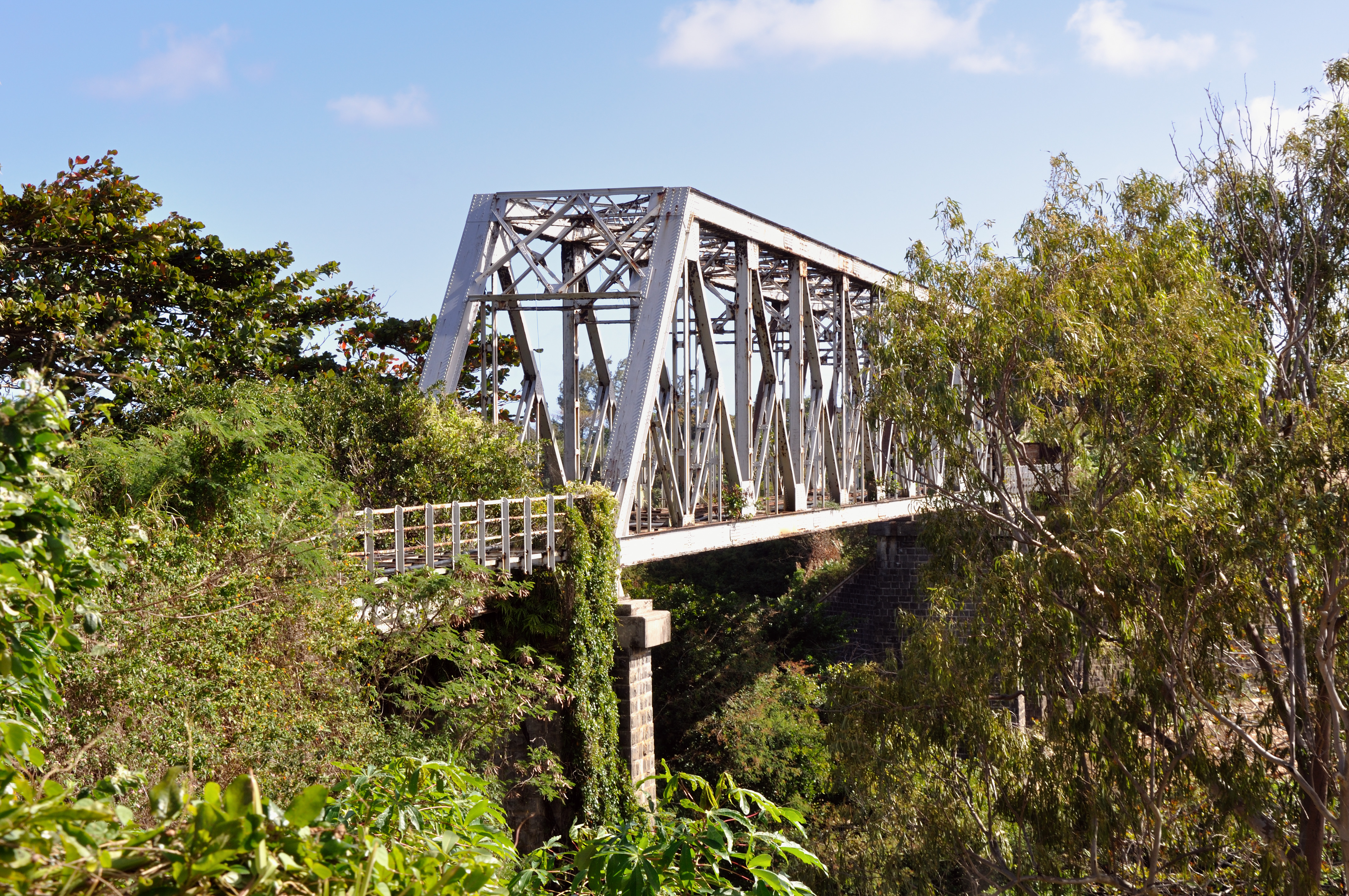
Old railway bridge near L'Escalier, 2009

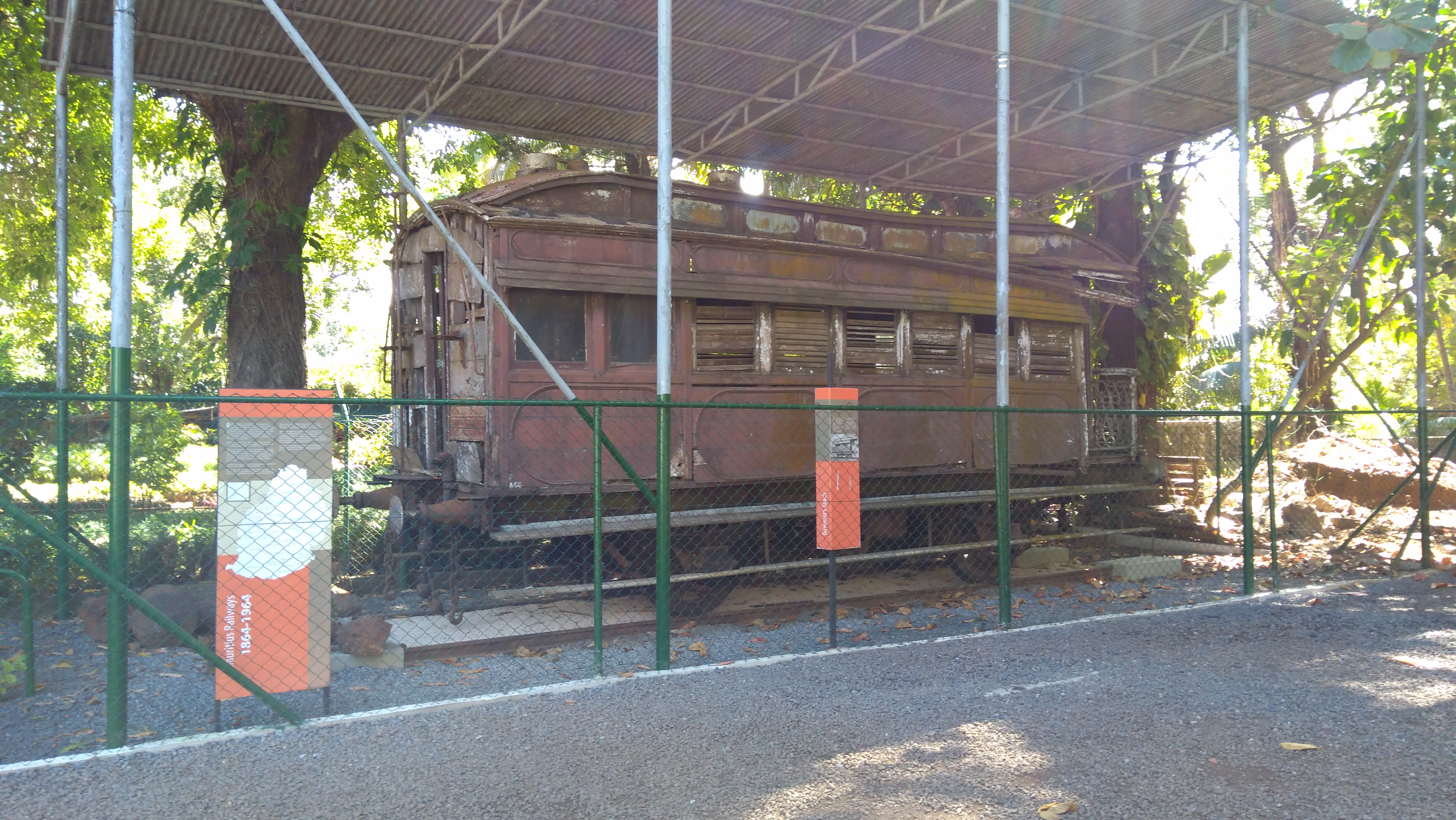
A railway carriage at the National History Museum, Mahébourg, 2018

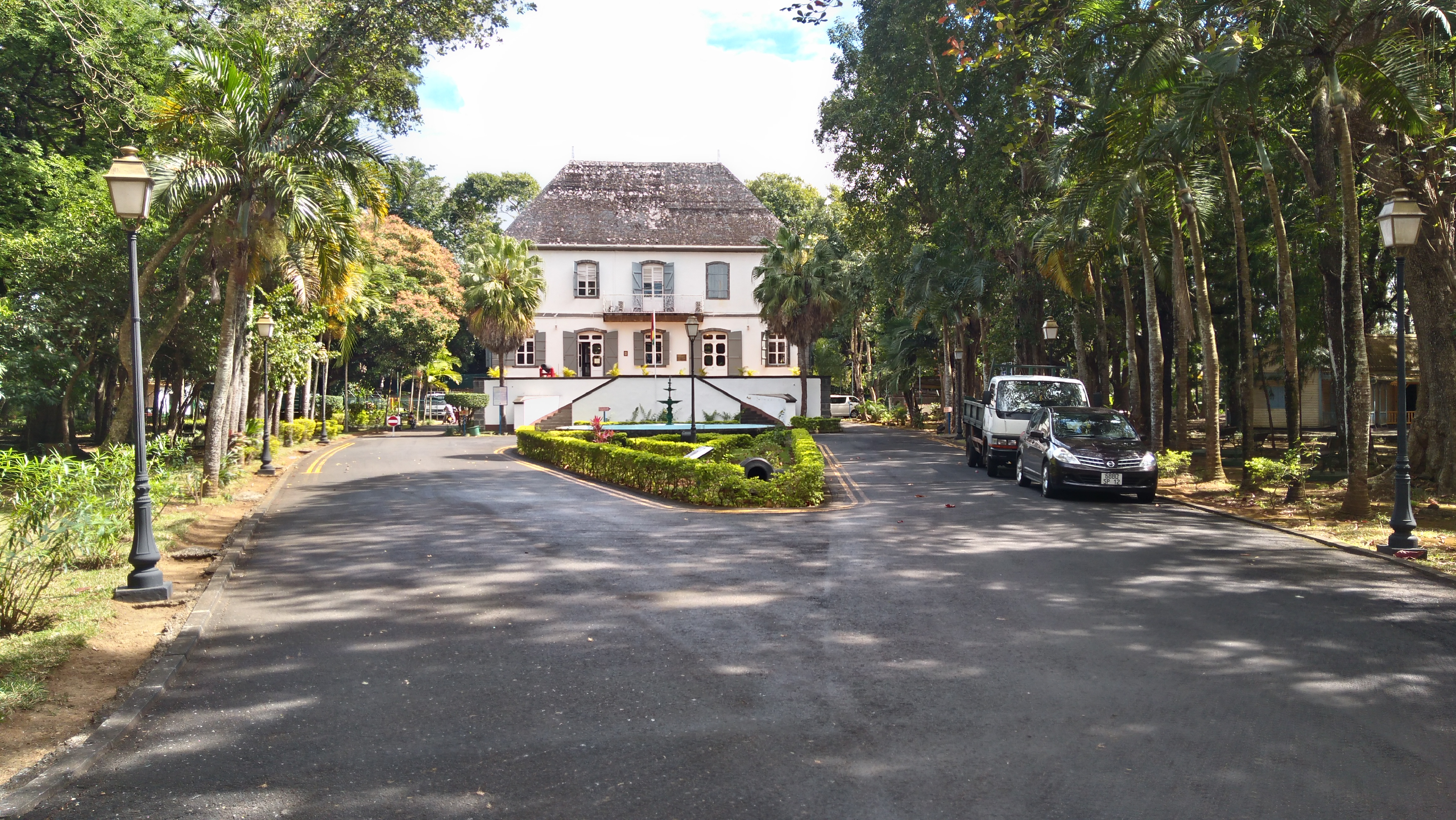
The National History Museum, Mahébourg, 2018

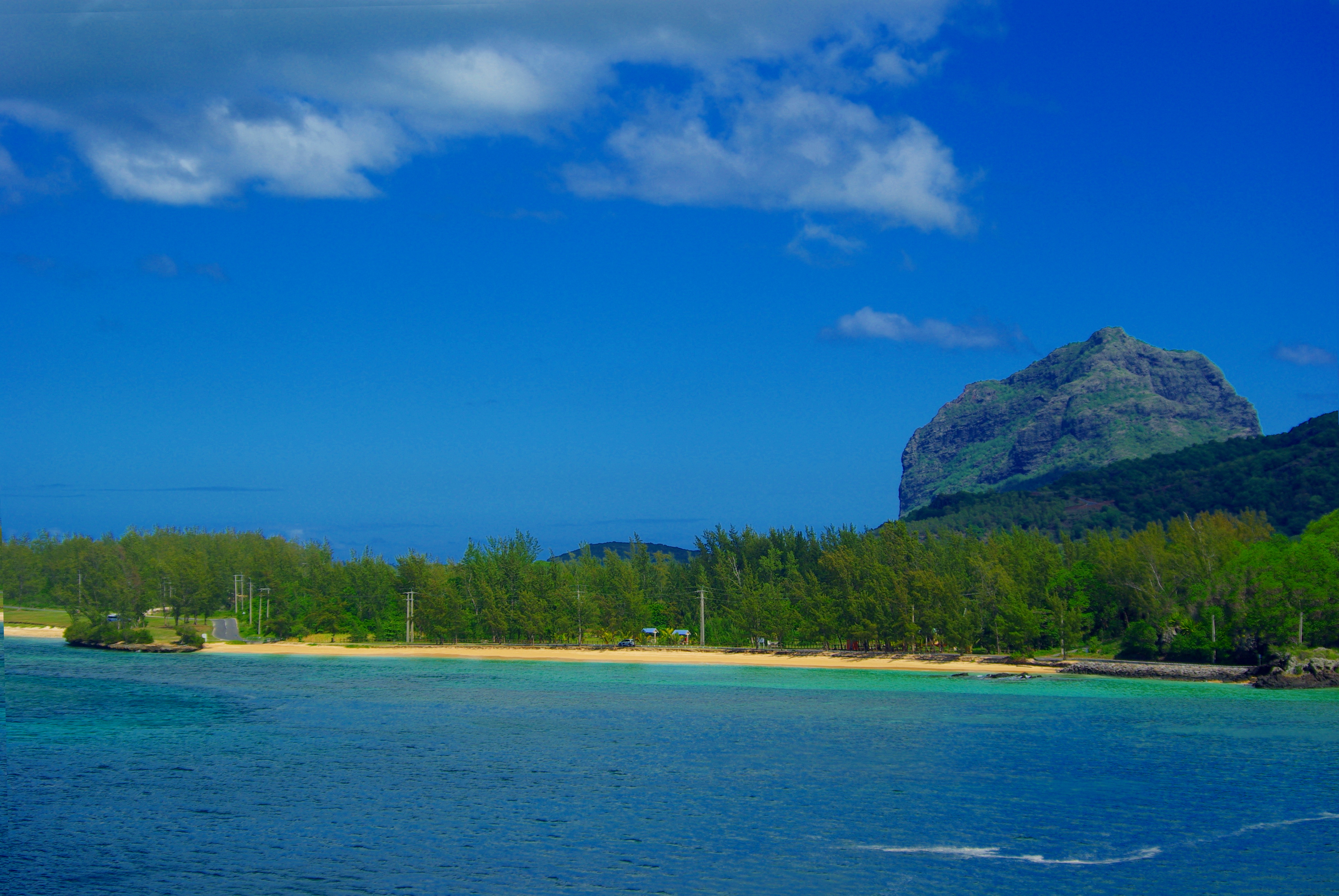
Le Morne Brabant, in the south-west of Mauritius, 2017

An Air Mauritius Boeing 707 at Heathrow Airport, London, 1981

== See also ==
- Foreign relations of Mauritius
- Foreign relations of the United Kingdom
- List of high commissioners of the United Kingdom to Mauritius
- Mauritian diaspora in the United Kingdom
- Agreement concerning the Chagos Archipelago including Diego Garcia
- Chagos Archipelago sovereignty dispute
- Economy of Mauritius

== Sources ==
=== Court and tribunal decisions ===
- Ahnee v Director of Public Prosecutions, UKPC 11 (Judicial Committee of the Privy Council 17 March 1999).
- Betamax Ltd v State Trading Corporation, UKPC 14 (Judicial Committee of the Privy Council 14 June 2021).
- Chagos Islanders v Attorney General and HM BIOT Commissioner, EWHC (QB) 2222 (High Court 9 October 2003).
- Dhooharika v Director of Public Prosecutions, UKPC 11 (Judicial Committee of the Privy Council 16 April 2014).
- Donoghue, Joan (25 February 2019). "Dissenting opinion of Judge Donoghue" (PDF). Legal Consequences of the Separation of the Chagos Archipelago from Mauritius in 1965, Advisory Opinion. I.C.J. Reports 2019. International Court of Justice. p. 261.
- Legal Consequences of the Separation of the Chagos Archipelago from Mauritius in 1965, Advisory Opinion (PDF). I.C.J. Reports 2019. International Court of Justice. 25 February 2019. p. 95.
- Dispute concerning delimitation of the maritime boundary between Mauritius and Maldives in the Indian Ocean (Mauritius/Maldives), Judgment (PDF). International Tribunal for the Law of the Sea. 28 April 2023.
- Katra Holdings Ltd v Standard Chartered Bank (Mauritius) Ltd, UKPC 8 (Judicial Committee of the Privy Council 9 April 2024).
- Written Comments of the Republic of Mauritius (PDF). Vol. I. International Court of Justice. 15 May 2018.
- Written Statement of the Republic of Mauritius (PDF). Vol. I. International Court of Justice. 1 March 2018.
- Mediterranean Shipping Company v Sotramon Ltd, UKPC 23 (Judicial Committee of the Privy Council 17 July 2017).
- In the Matter of the Chagos Marine Protected Area Arbitration (Mauritius v. United Kingdom): Award (PDF). Permanent Court of Arbitration. 18 March 2015.
- R (Pompe) v Secretary of State for Foreign, Commonwealth and Development Affairs; R (Mandarin) v Secretary of State for Foreign, Commonwealth and Development Affairs, EWHC (Admin) 529 (High Court 10 March 2026).
- State v Khoyratty, UKPC 13 (Judicial Committee of the Privy Council 22 March 2006).
- Counter-Memorial of the United Kingdom. Permanent Court of Arbitration. 15 July 2013.
- Written Comments of the United Kingdom (PDF). International Court of Justice. 15 May 2018.
- Written Statement of the United Kingdom (PDF). International Court of Justice. 15 February 2018.

=== United Nations documents ===
- Permanent Mission of the United Kingdom to the United Nations (19 January 2023). Note No. 004/23 to the Secretary-General, with the Written Ministerial Statement of 3 November 2022 (PDF) (Report). United Nations.
- United Nations Secretary-General (18 May 2020). Advisory opinion of the International Court of Justice on the legal consequences of the separation of the Chagos Archipelago from Mauritius in 1965: Report of the Secretary-General (A/74/834) (Report). United Nations.
- "Declarations recognizing as compulsory the jurisdiction of the International Court of Justice under Article 36, paragraph 2, of the Statute of the Court". United Nations Treaty Collection. United Nations.
- United Nations General Assembly (22 June 2017). Official Records, Seventy-first session, 88th plenary meeting, Thursday, 22 June 2017 (A/71/PV.88) (Report). United Nations.
- United Nations General Assembly (22 May 2019). Official Records, Seventy-third session, 83rd plenary meeting, Wednesday, 22 May 2019, 10 a.m. (A/73/PV.83) (Report). United Nations.
- United Nations General Assembly (24 April 1968). Resolution 2371 (XXII). Admission of Mauritius to membership in the United Nations (Report). United Nations.
- United Nations General Assembly (24 May 2019). Resolution adopted by the General Assembly on 22 May 2019: 73/295. Advisory opinion of the International Court of Justice on the legal consequences of the separation of the Chagos Archipelago from Mauritius in 1965 (A/RES/73/295) (Report). United Nations.
- "Joint submission by the Republic of Mauritius and the Republic of Seychelles". Commission on the Limits of the Continental Shelf. United Nations Division for Ocean Affairs and the Law of the Sea.
- "Mauritius". Maritime Space: Maritime Zones and Maritime Delimitation. United Nations Division for Ocean Affairs and the Law of the Sea.

=== Treaties and official documents ===
- "Chairperson of the AUC applauds historic Agreement between Mauritius & the United Kingdom recognising Mauritius sovereignty over Chagos Archipelago, including Diego Garcia" (Press release). African Union Commission. 3 October 2024.
- "Press Statement by H.E. Mahmoud Ali Youssouf, Chairperson of the African Union Commission on the Agreement Between the United Kingdom and the Republic of Mauritius on the Chagos Archipelago and the Establishment of a Strategic Partnership Framework" (Press release). African Union Commission. 23 May 2025.
- Home Office (5 March 2026). "Immigration Rules Appendix ETA National List". GOV.UK.
- Home Office (5 March 2026). "Immigration Rules Appendix Visitor: Visa national list". GOV.UK.
- "Arsenal Supporters' Clubs – Africa". Arsenal F.C..
- "MTC Jockey Club, Mauritius". Members. Asian Racing Federation.
- "Public Notice: Banking Licence" (PDF). Bank of Mauritius. 10 February 2020.
- "High Commissioner hands over aviation security equipment". GOV.UK. British High Commission Port Louis. 3 November 2013.
- "British High Commission in Mauritius launches COVID-19 fund: call for bids". GOV.UK. British High Commission Port Louis. 10 June 2020.
- "British High Commission Port Loius hosts FinTech Conference". GOV.UK. British High Commission Port Louis. 31 January 2017.
- "The High Commission responds to the Mauritius Oil Spill". GOV.UK. British High Commission Port Louis. 21 August 2020.
- "British High Commission hands over sniffer dogs to Mauritius". GOV.UK. British High Commission Port Louis. 24 September 2013.
- "Bank One MRPA". British International Investment.
- "About British Council Mauritius". British Council. Archived from the original on 6 June 2026.
- "IELTS". British Council Mauritius. Archived from the original on 13 July 2026.
- "Our partners". British Council Mauritius. Archived from the original on 6 June 2026.
- "Policy dialogues". British Council Mauritius. Archived from the original on 6 June 2026.
- "Professional and university exams". British Council Mauritius. Archived from the original on 13 July 2026.
- "Professional development". British Council Mauritius. Archived from the original on 6 June 2026.
- "Raising standards of English". British Council Mauritius. Archived from the original on 25 January 2026.
- "Learn English in the North with the British Council" (Press release). British Council. 3 December 2013. Archived from the original on 16 May 2026.
- "British Council launches IELTS for UKVI Academic in Mauritius" (Press release). British Council. 8 February 2024. Archived from the original on 6 June 2026.
- "High Commissioner". British High Commission, Port Louis. Foreign and Commonwealth Office. Archived from the original on 19 September 2006.
- "Our High Commissioner". UK in Mauritius. Foreign and Commonwealth Office. Archived from the original on 12 March 2010.
- "Mauritius 1847 'Post Office' 1d. orange-red, used on cover". Philatelic rarities. British Library. Archived from the original on 9 September 2019.
- "Mauritius 1847 'Post Office' 2d. deep blue, unused". Philatelic rarities. British Library. Archived from the original on 17 July 2016.
- "British Nationality Act 1981 (c. 61), Schedule 3". legislation.gov.uk.
- "British Overseas Territories Act 2002 (c. 8)". legislation.gov.uk.
- Bushell, Jon (12 November 2024). "Dead as a dodo". Royal Society. Royal Society.
- "Le Pack Sport" (in French). Canal+ Maurice. Archived from the original on 15 August 2025.
- "The UK and Mauritius to set up a Carbon Calculator". GOV.UK. British High Commission Port Louis. 27 August 2014.
- "UK announces bursaries for Chagossians to study at Middlesex University Mauritius". GOV.UK. British High Commission Port Louis. 25 November 2022.
- "Change of British High Commissioner to Mauritius". GOV.UK. Foreign and Commonwealth Office. 27 July 2010.
- "Change of British High Commissioner to Mauritius: Keith Allan" (Press release). Foreign and Commonwealth Office. 13 October 2016.
- "Change of British High Commissioner to Mauritius: Charlotte Pierre" (Press release). Foreign, Commonwealth and Development Office. 20 May 2021.
- "Change of British High Commissioner to Mauritius: Paul Brummell" (Press release). Foreign, Commonwealth and Development Office. 9 April 2025.
- "The Mauritian Muslim Welfare (St Albans) Association, registered charity number 1008145". Register of Charities. Charity Commission for England and Wales.
- "The Mauritian Telegu Association in the UK, registered charity number 1021132". Register of Charities. Charity Commission for England and Wales.
- "Voice of Mauritius Europe, registered charity number 1042474". Register of Charities. Charity Commission for England and Wales.
- "Mauritian Marathi Society, registered charity number 1083052". Register of Charities. Charity Commission for England and Wales.
- "Pere Laval Association (UK), registered charity number 1095599". Register of Charities. Charity Commission for England and Wales.
- "Anglo-Mauritian Disability Link, registered charity number 1099350". Register of Charities. Charity Commission for England and Wales.
- "Mauritius Hindu Association, registered charity number 1120485". Register of Charities. Charity Commission for England and Wales.
- "Mauritius Tamil Maha Sangam (UK), registered charity number 328597". Register of Charities. Charity Commission for England and Wales.
- "UK aid to protect 7,000 Commonwealth veterans of the British Armed Forces from extreme poverty" (Press release). Department for International Development. 8 November 2018.
- "Mauritius". Commonwealth Secretariat.
- The Constitution of the Republic of Mauritius (PDF). Mauritius National Assembly. May 2018.
- Mauritius Constitutional Conference Report 1965 (PDF). Colonial Office. 24 September 1965. Cmnd. 2797 – via Written Statement of the Republic of Mauritius (ICJ), Vol. III, Annex 64.
- "Court Circular: search results for "Mauritius", 1997". The Royal Family. The Royal Household. 1997.
- "Court Circular: search results for "Mauritius", 1998". The Royal Family. The Royal Household. 1998.
- "Court Circular: search results for "Mauritius", 2000". The Royal Family. The Royal Household. 2000.
- "Court Circular: search results for "Mauritius", 2001". The Royal Family. The Royal Household. 2001.
- "Court Circular: search results for "Mauritius", 2003". The Royal Family. The Royal Household. 2003.
- "Court Circular: search results for "Mauritius", 2004". The Royal Family. The Royal Household. 2004.
- "Court Circular: search results for "Mauritius", 2005". The Royal Family. The Royal Household. 2005.
- "Court Circular: search results for "Mauritius", 2006". The Royal Family. The Royal Household. 2006.
- "Court Circular: search results for "Mauritius", 2008". The Royal Family. The Royal Household. 2008.
- "Court Circular: search results for "Mauritius", 2010". The Royal Family. The Royal Household. 2010.
- "Court Circular: search results for "Mauritius", 2015". The Royal Family. The Royal Household. 2015.
- "Court Circular: search results for "Mauritius", 2018". The Royal Family. The Royal Household. 2018.
- "Court Circular: search results for "Mauritius", 2024". The Royal Family. The Royal Household. 2024.
- "Court Circular: search results for "Mauritius", 2025". The Royal Family. The Royal Household. 2025.
- "Courts Act (Cap. 168, Act 41 of 1945)" (PDF). Revised Laws of Mauritius. Attorney General's Office, Mauritius.
- "Chagossian arrivals in Crawley" (Press release). Crawley Borough Council. 14 June 2024.
- "The Criminal Code (Amendment) Act 2021 (Act No. 17 of 2021)" (PDF). National Assembly of Mauritius. 29 November 2021. Archived (PDF) from the original on 31 July 2024.
- CSC Alumni Team (10 August 2026). "Commonwealth Alumni Reconnect in Mauritius". Commonwealth Scholarship Commission in the UK.
- "Project Institution: Mauritian Wildlife Foundation". Darwin Initiative.
- Department of Health and Social Care (27 March 2025). "Code of practice for the international recruitment of health and social care personnel in England". GOV.UK.
- "Doing business in Mauritius: Mauritius trade and export guide". GOV.UK. Department for International Trade. 14 July 2016.
- "2011 UK-Mauritius Protocol to the 1981 Double Taxation Convention – in force". GOV.UK. HM Revenue and Customs. 15 November 2021.
- "2018 UK-Mauritius Protocol to the 1981 Double Taxation Convention – in force". GOV.UK. HM Revenue and Customs. 15 November 2021.
- Doughty, Stephen (9 September 2025). "Chagos Islands: Marine Protected Areas (70431)". UK Parliament: Written questions, answers and statements.
- Duncan, Alan (30 April 2019). "British Indian Ocean Territory (HCWS1528)". UK Parliament: Written questions, answers and statements.
- "Bilateral Agreements". Economic Development Board Mauritius.
- Economic Development Board (August 2024). "Mauritian Diaspora Scheme: guidelines" (PDF).
- Economic Development Board (June 2024). Highlights of the Property Market in Mauritius (PDF) (Report). EDB Insights.
- "Market Access". Economic Development Board Mauritius.
- "Mauritius: A Trusted International Financial Centre for UK investments into Africa". Economic Development Board Mauritius. 10 October 2024.
- "Education Act (Act 39 of 1957)" (PDF). UNESCO.
- Continuing the United Kingdom's trade relationship with the Eastern and Southern African region (Report). Department for International Trade. 6 February 2019.
- Status list: Agreement establishing an Economic Partnership Agreement between the Eastern and Southern Africa States, on the one part, and the United Kingdom of Great Britain and Northern Ireland, on the other part (Report). Foreign, Commonwealth and Development Office. 28 March 2024.
- External Trade: 4th Quarter 2025 (PDF) (Report). Economic and Social Indicators No. 1908. Statistics Mauritius. 25 February 2026.
- "The Extradition Act 2003 (Designation of Part 2 Territories) Order 2003 (SI 2003/3334)". legislation.gov.uk. 18 December 2003.
- "Jurisdictions under Increased Monitoring – October 2021". Financial Action Task Force. 21 October 2021.
- Foreign, Commonwealth and Development Office (19 October 2026). "Mauritius travel advice: safety and security". GOV.UK.
- Foreign, Commonwealth and Development Office (19 October 2026). "Mauritius travel advice: entry requirements". GOV.UK.
- Foreign, Commonwealth and Development Office (23 December 2024). "Living in Mauritius". GOV.UK.
- "Repeal of section 76B of the Mauritian Criminal Code by the National Assembly in Mauritius". GOV.UK. Foreign, Commonwealth and Development Office. 30 October 2025.
- "Mauritius: British High Commissioner, Arthur Wooller". Discovery. The National Archives. 1968. FCO 141/12245.
- "'Mauritius: First Impressions', despatch from Peter Carter, British High Commissioner, Port Louis". Discovery. The National Archives. 1971. FCO 160/123/26.
- "'Mauritius – Valedictory Despatch', despatch from Peter Anthony Carter, British High Commissioner, Port Louis". Discovery. The National Archives. 1973. FCO 160/155/2.
- "'Mauritius: First Impressions', despatch from Arthur Henry Brind, British High Commissioner, Port Louis". Discovery. The National Archives. 1974. FCO 160/161/15.
- "'Mauritius – Valedictory', despatch from Arthur Henry Brind, British High Commissioner, Port Louis". Discovery. The National Archives. 1977. FCO 160/189/24.
- "'First Impressions of Mauritius', despatch from William Alec Ward, British High Commissioner, Port Louis". Discovery. The National Archives. 1977. FCO 160/190/40.
- "'Mauritius: annual review for 1980 and Valedictory', despatch from William Alec Ward, British High Commissioner, Port Louis". Discovery. The National Archives. 1981. FCO 160/209/29.
- "'Mauritius: Valedictory', despatch from James Nicholas Allan, British High Commissioner, Port Louis". Discovery. The National Archives. 1985. FCO 160/229/41.
- "'Mauritius: annual review 1985', despatch from Richard Borman Crowson, British High Commissioner, Port Louis". Discovery. The National Archives. 1986. FCO 160/231/43.
- "'Mauritius: Valedictory', despatch from Richard Borman Crowson, British High Commissioner, Port Louis". Discovery. The National Archives. 1989. FCO 160/272/15.
- "'Mauritius: annual review for 1989', despatch from Michael Edward Howell, British High Commissioner, Port Louis". Discovery. The National Archives. 1990. FCO 160/277/13.
- "'Mauritius: annual review 1992', despatch Michael Edward Howell, British High Commissioner, Port Louis". Discovery. The National Archives. 1993. FCO 160/316/11.
- "'Mauritius: annual review 1993', despatch from John Clive Harrison, British High Commissioner, Port Louis". Discovery. The National Archives. 1994. FCO 160/328/6.
- "'Mauritius: annual review 1996', despatch from John Clive Harrison, British High Commissioner, Port Louis". Discovery. The National Archives. 1997. FCO 160/356/12.
- "'Mauritius: Annual Review for 1981', despatch from James Allan, British High Commissioner, Port Louis". Discovery. The National Archives. 1982. FCO 160/84/12.
- "Death of Sir Leckraz Teelock, Mauritian High Commissioner in London and Doyen of the Diplomatic Corps, May 1982". Discovery. The National Archives. 1982. FCO 31/3604.
- "Lunch hosted by Lynda Chalker, Minister of State for Foreign and Commonwealth Affairs, for Soo Soobiah, the new Mauritian High Commissioner, London, February 1988". Discovery. The National Archives. 1988. FCO 31/5560.
- "Valedictory despatch of Her Majesty's first High Commissioner to Mauritius". Discovery. The National Archives. 1970. FCO 31/624.
- "Mauritius – A key driver of quality investments into Africa" (PDF) (Press release). Financial Services Commission. 11 August 2019.
- "Signature of MoU between the Financial Services Commission, Mauritius and the Financial Conduct Authority, UK" (PDF) (Press release). Financial Services Commission. 18 April 2018.
- "Mauritius advances national strategy for AfCFTA Digital Trade with UK support". Government of Mauritius. Government Information Service, Prime Minister's Office. 19 February 2026.
- "National Audit Offices from Mauritius and UK sign Technical Assistance Agreement to improve audit capabilities". Government of Mauritius. Government Information Service, Prime Minister's Office. 21 October 2024.
- "Mauritius cooperates with the UK in the pharmaceuticals and biotechnology fields". Government of Mauritius. Government Information Service, Prime Minister's Office. 19 January 2023.
- "BREXIT: Mauritius will need to have a bilateral trade agreement with the UK, PM says". Government of Mauritius. Government Information Service, Prime Minister's Office. 29 June 2016.
- "New Office of British High Commission inaugurated in Floréal". Government of Mauritius. Government Information Service, Prime Minister's Office. 31 January 2022.
- "Strengthening Mauritius-UK Strategic Partnership Framework". Government of Mauritius. Government Information Service, Prime Minister's Office. 31 July 2025.
- "PM: Mauritius strongly deplores UK's rejection of the ICJ's Advisory Opinion and UNGA Resolution 73/295". Government of Mauritius. Government Information Service, Prime Minister's Office. 22 November 2019.
- "Official reception honouring Mauritian Chevening scholars". Government of Mauritius. Government Information Service, Prime Minister's Office. 27 August 2025.
- "PM Not to Attend Commonwealth Meeting in Sri Lanka". Government of Mauritius. Government Information Service, Prime Minister's Office. 13 November 2013.
- "Le Premier ministre participe à l'ouverture du Sommet du Commonwealth". Government of Mauritius (in French). Government Information Service, Prime Minister's Office. 24 June 2022.
- "Mauritius to host Commonwealth Law Ministers Meeting from 22 to 25 November 2022". Government of Mauritius. Government Information Service, Prime Minister's Office. 18 November 2022.
- "Mauritius and Durrell Wildlife Conservation Trust explore further cooperation on Biodiversity Conservation". Government of Mauritius. Government Information Service, Prime Minister's Office. 5 October 2026.
- "Mauritius and UK reaffirm partnership in education sector". Government of Mauritius. Government Information Service, Prime Minister's Office. 25 September 2025.
- "Mauritius and UK Sign Enhanced Strategic Trade Partnership MoU". Government of Mauritius. Government Information Service, Prime Minister's Office. 30 July 2026.
- "Mauritius and United Kingdom collaborate to advance climate and environmental initiatives". Government of Mauritius. Government Information Service, Prime Minister's Office. 14 August 2025.
- "Financial services sector: Enhancing cooperation between Mauritius and United Kingdom". Government of Mauritius. Government Information Service, Prime Minister's Office. 21 August 2025.
- "Minister Ganoo and Senior UK Minister of State for South Asia discuss key priority areas". Government of Mauritius. Government Information Service, Prime Minister's Office. 31 January 2022.
- "Minister Ganoo discusses maritime security with UK's Foreign Secretary". Government of Mauritius. Government Information Service, Prime Minister's Office. 2 March 2023.
- "Mauritius-UK strengthen partnership based on unity, collaboration and friendship". Government of Mauritius. Government Information Service, Prime Minister's Office. 14 November 2025.
- "Ministry of Health and Wellness and King's College NHS Foundation Trust (UK) sign Facility Assessment Agreement". Government of Mauritius. Government Information Service, Prime Minister's Office. 16 September 2024.
- "British High Commissioner discusses light rail collaboration with Minister of Land Transport". Government of Mauritius. Government Information Service, Prime Minister's Office. 18 August 2025.
- "Metro Express: UK assistance aims to improve sustainability and efficiency". Government of Mauritius. Government Information Service, Prime Minister's Office. 19 January 2026.
- "ICT sector: Objectivity UK starts operations in Mauritius". Government of Mauritius. Government Information Service, Prime Minister's Office. 3 June 2022.
- "PM announces setting up of UK legal framework model to address alleged arbitrary arrests". Government of Mauritius. Government Information Service, Prime Minister's Office. 22 October 2015.
- "Mauritius receives 211,200 doses of Pfizer paediatric vaccines from the United Kingdom". Government of Mauritius. Government Information Service, Prime Minister's Office. 11 May 2022.
- "United Kingdom to support Mauritius in its climate change challenges". Government of Mauritius. Government Information Service, Prime Minister's Office. 19 August 2021.
- "UK's High Commissioner-designate presents Letter of Credence to President Roopun". Government of Mauritius. Government Information Service, Prime Minister's Office. 17 August 2021.
- "British High Commissioner pays farewell call on President Gokhool". Government of Mauritius. Government Information Service, Prime Minister's Office. 20 May 2025.
- "British High Commissioner expresses intent to collaborate on bilateral issues with Mauritius". Government of Mauritius. Government Information Service, Prime Minister's Office. 26 August 2021.
- "COVID-19: UK donates 500 000 Personal Protective Equipment to Mauritius". Government of Mauritius. Government Information Service, Prime Minister's Office. 27 October 2022.
- "Prime Minister receives UK Trade Envoy, Mr Selous". Government of Mauritius. Government Information Service, Prime Minister's Office. 17 April 2023.
- "UK Prime Minister's Trade Envoy to Mauritius pays courtesy call on PM Jugnauth". Government of Mauritius. Government Information Service, Prime Minister's Office. 3 October 2023.
- "Signing of UK-Mauritius Strategic Trade Partnership to boost trade and investment". Government of Mauritius. Government Information Service, Prime Minister's Office. 18 April 2023.
- "Chagos Archipelago sovereignty dispute: Discussions with UK to start on 9 November 2016, says PM". Government of Mauritius. Government Information Service, Prime Minister's Office. 3 November 2016.
- "Positive outcomes for the Buyers-Sellers Meetings organised in the UK". Government of Mauritius. Government Information Service, Prime Minister's Office. 10 June 2016.
- "Mauritian manufacturers showcase high-value added products in the UK". Government of Mauritius. Government Information Service, Prime Minister's Office. 23 May 2016.
- "PM discusses Trade and investment with UK Commissioner". Government of Mauritius. Government Information Service, Prime Minister's Office. 12 February 2025.
- "Mauritius extends travel restrictions to European Union, United Kingdom, Switzerland and Reunion". Government of Mauritius. Government Information Service, Prime Minister's Office. 16 March 2020.
- "MoU on Cooperation in Research, Education and Training between Mauritius and UK". Government of Mauritius. Government Information Service, Prime Minister's Office. 5 April 2012.
- "New strain of Covid-19: Restriction of passengers from UK and South Africa". Government of Mauritius. Government Information Service, Prime Minister's Office. 22 December 2020.
- "Senior UK Police Officers in Mauritius to identify capacity building and cyber expertise opportunities with the MPF". Government of Mauritius. Government Information Service, Prime Minister's Office. 12 April 2022.
- "COVID-19: UK and South Africa variants detected in imported cases, says Health Minister". Government of Mauritius. Government Information Service, Prime Minister's Office. 19 May 2021.
- "MV Wakashio: Environmental monitoring of terrestrial and marine resources". Government of Mauritius. Government Information Service, Prime Minister's Office. 28 August 2020.
- "Types of election, referendums, and who can vote". GOV.UK. 22 October 2024.
- "British High Commission Port Louis". GOV.UK.
- "Charlotte Pierre". GOV.UK.
- "Department for Business and Trade Mauritius". GOV.UK.
- "Jonathan Drew". GOV.UK.
- "Keith Allan". GOV.UK.
- "Nick Leake". GOV.UK.
- Government Programme 2025–2029: A Bridge to the Future (PDF) (Address by the President of the Republic of Mauritius). National Assembly of Mauritius. 24 January 2025.
- "Dodo bones". Grant Museum of Zoology: Top ten specimens. University College London.
- "Mauritius (Defence Agreement)". Hansard, House of Commons (Written Answers). 19 March 1968.
- "National Health Service Pay". Hansard, House of Commons. 23 May 1974.
- "Defence". Hansard, House of Commons. 31 March 1976.
- "Mauritius". Hansard, House of Commons. 24 October 1988.
- "Immigration Bill". Hansard, House of Commons. 13 October 2015.
- "Mauritius Independence Bill". Hansard, House of Lords. 13 February 1968.
- "British Indian Ocean Territory: Sovereignty". Hansard, House of Commons (Westminster Hall). 7 December 2022.
- "Mauritius Independence Bill". Hansard, House of Commons. 14 December 1967.
- "Royal Navy". Hansard, House of Commons. 9 July 1975.
- "Diego Garcia Military Base and British Indian Ocean Territory Bill". Hansard, House of Commons. 13 April 2026.
- "King's Speech". Hansard, House of Lords. 18 May 2026.
- "Diego Garcia Military Base and British Indian Ocean Territory Bill". Hansard, House of Lords. 13 October 2026.
- Harker, Rachael (25 November 2025). NHS staff from overseas: statistics (PDF) (Report). Research Briefing. House of Commons Library.
- Foreign and Commonwealth Office (January 2015). Heads of Mission: Precedence and Spouse List, January 2015 (Report). Archived from the original on 7 April 2015.
- Foreign, Commonwealth and Development Office (November 2024). Heads of Mission List: November 2024 (Report). Archived from the original on 9 December 2024.
- Healey, John (22 May 2025). Defence Secretary oral statement on Diego Garcia (Speech). House of Commons.
- "Table 28 – Non-UK domiciled HE students by HE provider and country of domicile 2014/15 to 2021/22". Higher Education Statistics Agency. January 2023. Archived from the original on 18 April 2024.
- "High Commissioner to Mauritius presents credentials". GOV.UK. British High Commission Port Louis. 19 August 2014.
- Participation in Tertiary Education 2022 (PDF) (Report). Higher Education Commission, Mauritius. Archived from the original (PDF) on 22 April 2024.
- "Get an electronic travel authorisation (ETA) to visit the UK". GOV.UK. 28 May 2025.
- Home Office (27 August 2026). "Entry clearance visa applications and outcomes detailed datasets, year ending June 2026" (XLSX). GOV.UK.
- Home Office (2022). "Nationality and Borders Bill: Chagossian nationality factsheet". GOV.UK.
- "HSBC in Mauritius". HSBC Bank (Mauritius) Limited.
- Le Morne Cultural Landscape (Mauritius), No 1259 (PDF) (Advisory body evaluation). International Council on Monuments and Sites. 11 March 2008.
- "World plugs". International Electrotechnical Commission. Archived from the original on 12 April 2021.
- "About Us". Institute for Judicial and Legal Studies of Mauritius.
- "International Programme Fund – call for bids 2022-23". GOV.UK. British High Commission Port Louis. 19 July 2022.
- "Investec Mauritius". Investec Bank (Mauritius) Limited.
- "Practice Direction 1: The Judicial Committee – general notes". Judicial Committee of the Privy Council.
- "Law Practitioners Act (Act 55 of 1984)" (PDF). Revised Laws of Mauritius. Attorney General's Office, Mauritius.
- "Africa". Official Liverpool Supporters Clubs. Liverpool F.C. 12 February 2025.
- "LFC International Academy launches in Mauritius". Liverpool F.C. 3 July 2019. Archived from the original on 21 July 2020.
- "Liverpool FC launches global partnership with Mauritius". Liverpool F.C. 20 July 2020. Archived from the original on 21 July 2020.
- Foreign and Commonwealth Office (July 2014). London Diplomatic List: July 2014 (PDF) (Report). Archived from the original (PDF) on 29 July 2014.
- Foreign and Commonwealth Office (February 2016). London Diplomatic List: February 2016 (PDF) (Report). Archived from the original (PDF) on 4 March 2016.
- Foreign, Commonwealth and Development Office (October 2026). London Diplomatic List: October 2026 (Report).
- "Birthday Honours: Mauritius". The London Gazette. No. 44605 (Supplement). 8 June 1968. p. 6347.
- "New Year Honours: Mauritius". The London Gazette. No. 45558 (Supplement). 1 January 1972. p. 47.
- "Lord Mayor of the City of London in Mauritius". GOV.UK. British High Commission Port Louis. 24 February 2016.
- Lord Mountevans (24 February 2016). "Message from the Lord Mayor". GOV.UK. British High Commission Port Louis.
- "How can I watch Liverpool v City on TV?". Manchester City F.C. 8 February 2026.
- "Rest of the World". Supporters' clubs. Manchester United F.C..
- High Commission of the Republic of Mauritius, London. "News". Government of Mauritius. Archived from the original on 5 November 2019.
- "National History Museum: Historical background". Mauritius Museums Council.
- "Remembrance Day". Mauritius Museums Council.
- "Mauritius Republic Act 1992 (c. 45)". legislation.gov.uk. The National Archives.
- "Champ de Mars". Mauritius Now. Mauritius Tourism Promotion Authority.
- "La Citadel". Mauritius Now. Mauritius Tourism Promotion Authority.
- "Learn these useful tips to enjoy your Mauritian holiday". Mauritius Now. Mauritius Tourism Promotion Authority. 28 November 2023.
- "Liverpool football club and Mauritius reactivate their groundbreaking global partnership". Mauritius Now. Mauritius Tourism Promotion Authority. 3 August 2022.
- "History". The Mauritius Turf Club. 12 March 2014. Archived from the original on 2 October 2022.
- "Mauritius: tax treaties". GOV.UK. HM Revenue and Customs. 15 November 2021.
- "About Us". Mauritius Examinations Syndicate.
- "About MDX Mauritius". Middlesex University Mauritius.
- "Mauritius International Knowledge Investment Forum 2014 in London". GOV.UK. British High Commission Port Louis. 2 March 2014.
- "Mauritius and the UK to explore new avenues for educational cooperation". Government of Mauritius. Ministry of Education and Human Resource. 14 March 2025.
- "Mauritius High Commission – London, United Kingdom of Great Britain and Northern Ireland". Ministry of Foreign Affairs, Regional Integration and International Trade. Government of Mauritius.
- "2021 UK-Mauritius Synthesised text of the Multilateral Instrument and the 1981 Double Taxation Convention and Protocol – in force". GOV.UK. HM Revenue and Customs. 15 November 2021.
- "The Money Laundering and Terrorist Financing (Amendment) (High-Risk Countries) Regulations 2021 (SI 2021/392)". legislation.gov.uk. 24 March 2021.
- "The Money Laundering and Terrorist Financing (Amendment) (No. 3) (High-Risk Countries) Regulations 2021 (SI 2021/1218)". legislation.gov.uk. 1 November 2021.
- "Air Mauritius moves operations to London Gatwick Airport with daily direct flights from 29 October 2023" (Press release). Mauritius Tourism Promotion Authority. 26 June 2023.
- "Birds". Museum of Zoology, University of Cambridge.
- "Highlights of the Museum of Zoology" (PDF) (Gallery trail). Museum of Zoology, University of Cambridge.
- National Assembly of Mauritius (4 February 2025). Parliamentary Debates (Hansard), Eighth National Assembly, First Session, No. 02 of 2025 (unrevised): Tuesday 4 February 2025 (Report). Archived from the original on 19 March 2025.
- "Hon. Members". National Assembly of Mauritius.
- "Conservation and restoration". National Heritage Fund.
- "List of National Heritage Sites in the Republic of Mauritius" (PDF). National Heritage Fund.
- "The dodo bird: The real facts about this icon of extinction". Natural History Museum. Natural History Museum. 31 July 2025.
- "Fossil bird collection". Natural History Museum. Natural History Museum.
- Northern Ireland Statistics and Research Agency (2013). "Country of birth – full detail: QS206NI". Census 2011. Archived from the original on 4 March 2016.
- Northern Ireland Statistics and Research Agency (31 May 2023). "Census 2021 main statistics: country of birth – full detail (MS-A18)".
- Nursing and Midwifery Council (2026). "The NMC register: data tables, UK, March 2026" (XLSX).
- National Records of Scotland (2013). "Country of birth (detailed): Scotland" (PDF). Scotland's Census 2011. Archived from the original (PDF) on 15 February 2017.
- OECD (2005). "Country-of-birth database". Archived from the original on 25 April 2007. United Kingdom data from the 2001 Census of Population.
- Office for National Statistics (26 March 2013). "QS213EW: Country of birth (expanded)". 2011 Census. Nomis.
- Office for National Statistics (28 March 2023). "Passports held by country of birth (RM108)". Census 2021. Figures for Mauritius are from the dataset customised to the "Country of birth (extended) (190 categories)" classification, by country, region or local authority, and cross-tabulated with "Passports held (52 categories)" or "Year of arrival in the UK".
- Openshaw, Hannah (18 August 2026). "Commonwealth Scholars from Small Island Developing States selected for 2026/27 Master's Scholarships". Commonwealth Scholarship Commission in the UK.
- "The Oxford dodo". Learning more. Oxford University Museum of Natural History.
- "The Oxford Dodo" (Presenting case display, 27 May – 10 August 2015). Oxford University Museum of Natural History.
- "Overseas business risk: Mauritius". GOV.UK. Department for Business and Trade and Foreign, Commonwealth and Development Office. 29 June 2023.
- Toponymic Factfile: Mauritius (PDF) (Report). Permanent Committee on Geographical Names. 2025.
- Final Report of the Committee on the Review of the Legal Framework for Admission to Practise Law in Mauritius (PDF) (Report). Attorney General's Office, Mauritius. 10 March 2020.
- "UK signs agreement with Mauritius to transfer suspected pirates for prosecution" (Press release). Foreign and Commonwealth Office. 8 June 2012.
- "PM call with Prime Minister Jugnauth of Mauritius: 14 February 2023" (Press release). Prime Minister's Office, 10 Downing Street. 14 February 2023.
- "PM call with Mauritius Prime Minister Pravind Jugnauth: 22 February 2024" (Press release). Prime Minister's Office, 10 Downing Street. 22 February 2024.
- "PM call with Prime Minister Ramgoolam of Mauritius: 21 September 2026" (Press release). Prime Minister's Office, 10 Downing Street. 21 September 2026.
- "PM meeting with Prime Minister Pravind Jugnauth: 21 September 2022" (Press release). Prime Minister's Office, 10 Downing Street. 21 September 2022.
- "PM meeting with Prime Minister Jugnauth of Mauritius: 9 September 2023" (Press release). Prime Minister's Office, 10 Downing Street. 9 September 2023.
- "PM meetings with world leaders at CHOGM" (Press release). Prime Minister's Office, 10 Downing Street. 5 November 2026.
- "Cabinet Decisions taken on 7th December 2001". Government of Mauritius. Prime Minister's Office. 7 December 2001.
- "Cabinet Decisions taken on 16 December 2005". Government of Mauritius. Prime Minister's Office. 16 December 2005.
- "Cabinet Decisions taken on 20 January 2006". Government of Mauritius. Prime Minister's Office. 20 January 2006.
- "Cabinet Decisions taken on 06 October 2006". Government of Mauritius. Prime Minister's Office. 6 October 2006.
- "Cabinet Decisions taken on 30 November 2007". Government of Mauritius. Prime Minister's Office. 30 November 2007.
- "Cabinet Decisions taken on 20 June 2008". Government of Mauritius. Prime Minister's Office. 20 June 2008.
- "Cabinet Decisions, 11 December 2009" (PDF). Government of Mauritius. Prime Minister's Office. 11 December 2009.
- "Cabinet Decisions taken on 26 November 2010". Government of Mauritius. Prime Minister's Office. 26 November 2010.
- "Cabinet Decisions 02 March 2012". Government of Mauritius. Prime Minister's Office. 2 March 2012.
- "Cabinet Decisions 15 June 2012". Government of Mauritius. Prime Minister's Office. 15 June 2012.
- "Cabinet Decisions 26 April 2013" (PDF). Government of Mauritius. Prime Minister's Office. 26 April 2013.
- "Cabinet Decisions taken on 27 April 2018" (PDF). Government of Mauritius. Prime Minister's Office. 27 April 2018.
- "Cabinet Decisions taken on 29 March 2019" (PDF). Government of Mauritius. Prime Minister's Office. 29 March 2019.
- "Cabinet Decisions taken on 24 January 2020" (PDF). Government of Mauritius. Prime Minister's Office. 24 January 2020.
- "Highlights of Cabinet Meeting – 12 November 2021" (PDF). Government of Mauritius. Prime Minister's Office. 12 November 2021.
- "Highlights of Cabinet Decisions – 1 July 2022" (PDF). Government of Mauritius. Prime Minister's Office. 1 July 2022.
- "Highlights of Cabinet Decisions – 4 November 2022" (PDF). Government of Mauritius. Prime Minister's Office. 4 November 2022.
- "Highlights of Cabinet Meeting – Friday 17 February 2023" (PDF). Government of Mauritius. Prime Minister's Office. 17 February 2023.
- "Highlights of Cabinet Meeting – 2 August 2024" (PDF). Government of Mauritius. Prime Minister's Office. 2 August 2024.
- "Highlights of Cabinet Meeting – 6 September 2024" (PDF). Government of Mauritius. Prime Minister's Office. 6 September 2024.
- "Highlights of Cabinet Meeting – Friday 28 March 2025" (PDF). Government of Mauritius. Prime Minister's Office. 28 March 2025.
- "Commonwealth Heads of Government Meeting (CHOGM) – Apr 2018". Prime Minister's Office Singapore. April 2018.
- "Communique: Meeting between the Rt Hon Prime Minister and Senior Officials from the UK and the US on Chagos Archipelago" (PDF) (Press release). Prime Minister's Office, Republic of Mauritius. 24 June 2016 – via ION News.
- "QAA signs MoU with Mauritius Higher Education Commission". Quality Assurance Agency for Higher Education. 21 May 2025.
- Record of a Conversation between the Prime Minister and the Premier of Mauritius, Sir Seewoosagur Ramgoolam, at No. 10, Downing Street, at 10 a.m. on Thursday, 23 September 1965 (PDF). 23 September 1965. TNA FO 371/184528 – via Memorial of Mauritius, Annex 18.
- "More countries added to red list to protect UK vaccination programme against variants of concern" (Press release). Department for Transport. 15 March 2021.
- "Remploy and Ministry of Social Security signs MOU". GOV.UK. British High Commission Port Louis. 25 September 2013.
- "Representation of the People Act 1983 (c. 2), section 4". legislation.gov.uk.
- "Understanding our Traffic Signs" (PDF). Road Safety Unit, Government of Mauritius. Archived from the original (PDF) on 1 August 2014.
- "Mauritius proof 10 rupees 1971 commemorating the independence". Royal Collection Trust. RCIN 445247.
- "School History". Royal College Curepipe. Archived from the original on 24 March 2023.
- "Histoire" (in French). Royal Society of Arts & Sciences of Mauritius. 25 November 2025.
- British-Chagossian households in Greater Manchester (PDF) (Report). Salford CVS. 24 March 2025.
- "Shakespeare Lives in Mauritius". GOV.UK. British High Commission Port Louis. 2 December 2015.
- Snoxell, David (19 November 2007). "David Raymond Snoxell" (PDF). British Diplomatic Oral History Programme (Interview). Interviewed by Malcolm McBain. Churchill Archives Centre, University of Cambridge. Archived from the original (PDF) on 31 July 2020.
- "Southern Africa Prosperity Fund: Call for Project Bids for 2016/17". GOV.UK. British High Commission Port Louis. 19 January 2016.
- "About Us". Standard Chartered Bank (Mauritius) Limited.
- Statistics Mauritius (May 2024). 2022 Housing and Population Census, Republic of Mauritius. Volume II: Demographic and Fertility Characteristics (PDF) (Report).
- Statistics Mauritius (27 February 2026). International Travel & Tourism – Year 2025 (PDF) (Report). Economic and Social Indicators.
- Statistics Mauritius (22 May 2026). "Tourism: historical series, 1974–2025" (XLS).
- Annual Report for the Financial Year ended 30 June 2021 (PDF) (Report). State Trading Corporation. 2021.
- Thatcher, Margaret (8 August 1984). "Letter to Anerood Jugnauth" (PDF). Margaret Thatcher Foundation. The National Archives, PREM 19/1310 f12.
- "BW 44: British Council: Registered Files, Mauritius". Discovery. The National Archives.
- "CO 167: Colonial Office and predecessors: Mauritius, Original Correspondence". Discovery. The National Archives.
- "Mauritius backflick". Tottenham Hotspur F.C..
- Trade and investment factsheets: Mauritius (PDF) (Report). Department for Business, Innovation, Science and Trade. 24 September 2026 – via GOV.UK.
- "Trade Envoy programme appointments" (Press release). Department for Business and Trade. 20 January 2026.
- "Trade with Eastern and Southern African (ESA) states". GOV.UK. Department for Business and Trade. 2 August 2024.
- "Travel restrictions update: South Africa ban extended, Israel (and Jerusalem) removed from Travel Corridors list" (Press release). Department for Transport. 7 January 2021.
- "First UK education fair held in Mauritius". GOV.UK. British High Commission Port Louis. 2 March 2014.
- "British experts help Mauritius protect coral reefs from oil spill" (Press release). Department for International Development and Foreign and Commonwealth Office. 20 August 2020.
- "UK secures future of vital Diego Garcia Military Base to protect national security" (Press release). Ministry of Defence and Foreign, Commonwealth and Development Office. 22 May 2025.
- Simon Manley (24 January 2024). 45th Universal Periodic Review of human rights: UK statement on Mauritius (Speech). Geneva.
- The Supreme Court of the United Kingdom and the Judicial Committee of the Privy Council: Annual Report and Accounts 2024–2025 (PDF) (Report). Supreme Court of the United Kingdom. 14 July 2025. HC 1094.
- The Supreme Court of the United Kingdom and the Judicial Committee of the Privy Council: Annual Report and Accounts 2025–2026 (PDF) (Report). Supreme Court of the United Kingdom. 13 July 2026. HC 436.
- "UK Trade & Investment Office opens in Mauritius". GOV.UK. British High Commission Port Louis. 31 January 2015.
- "UK to host African Investment Summit in April 2024" (Press release). Foreign, Commonwealth and Development Office. 9 March 2023.
- "Joint statement on trade between UK and the ESA states" (Press release). Department for International Trade. 12 April 2018.
- Agreement between the Government of the United Kingdom of Great Britain and Northern Ireland and the Government of the Republic of Mauritius concerning the Chagos Archipelago including Diego Garcia (CS Mauritius No.1/2025, CP 1334) (Report). Foreign, Commonwealth and Development Office. 22 May 2025.
- Agreement between the Government of the United Kingdom of Great Britain and Northern Ireland and the Government of the Republic of Mauritius concerning Air Services, Port Louis, 26 February 2009 (PDF) (Report). Treaty Series No. 12 (2009), Cm 7663. The Stationery Office. June 2009.
- "1981 UK-Mauritius Double Taxation Convention, as amended in 2018 – in force". GOV.UK. HM Revenue and Customs. 15 November 2021.
- Agreement between the Government of the United Kingdom of Great Britain and Northern Ireland and the Government of Mauritius for the Promotion and Protection of Investments, Port Louis, 20 May 1986 (PDF) (Report). Treaty Series No. 6 (1987), Cm 65. HMSO. January 1987.
- "Joint Communique: UK-Mauritius Strategic Partnership Framework" (Press release). Foreign, Commonwealth and Development Office. 22 May 2025.
- "UK and Mauritius joint statement, 3 October 2024" (Press release). Foreign, Commonwealth and Development Office. 3 October 2024.
- "Joint Press Statement from the British High Commission and the Embassy of the United States of America" (PDF) (Press release). British High Commission Port Louis; Embassy of the United States of America, Port Louis. 24 June 2016 – via ION News.
- "High Commissioner Jonathan Drew signs UNCITRAL Convention". GOV.UK. British High Commission Port Louis. 19 March 2015.
- "Aapravasi Ghat". World Heritage List. UNESCO World Heritage Centre.
- "Le Morne Cultural Landscape". World Heritage List. UNESCO World Heritage Centre.
- Agreement between the Government of Mauritius and the Government of the United Kingdom of Great Britain and Northern Ireland on mutual defence and assistance (with annex). Signed at Port Louis, on 12 March 1968 (No. 9267) (PDF). United Nations Treaty Series. Vol. 648. United Nations. 1968.
- Doughty, Stephen (12 January 2026). "Chagossians: British Nationality (101360)". UK Parliament: Written questions, answers and statements.
- Richards, Jake (11 March 2026). "Prisoners: Repatriation (117419)". UK Parliament: Written questions, answers and statements.
- Pollard, Luke (9 June 2025). "Mauritius: Security (54653)". UK Parliament: Written questions, answers and statements.
- Doughty, Stephen (9 June 2025). "Mauritius: Climate Change (54747)". UK Parliament: Written questions, answers and statements.
- Falconer, Hamish (11 September 2025). "Mauritius: Development Aid (55082)". UK Parliament: Written questions, answers and statements.
- Winterton, Rosie (6 October 2026). "Mauritius: Marine Protected Areas (HL3697)". UK Parliament: Written questions, answers and statements.
- "Mauritius – Member information". World Trade Organization.
- "The United Kingdom – Member information". World Trade Organization.
- "The National Crime (Interim) Agency Bill (No. XVIII of 2026)" (PDF). National Assembly of Mauritius. 16 October 2026.
- National Assembly of Mauritius (15 July 2025). Parliamentary Debates (Hansard), Eighth National Assembly, First Session, No. 28 of 2025 (unrevised): Tuesday 15 July 2025 (PDF) (Report).
- National Assembly of Mauritius (20 October 2026). Parliamentary Debates (Hansard), Eighth National Assembly, First Session, No. 29 of 2026 (unrevised): Tuesday 20 October 2026 (PDF) (Report).
- "The National Crime Agency Bill (No. XVII of 2026)" (PDF). National Assembly of Mauritius. 16 October 2026.
- "Member States". African Union.
- "Member States". Common Market for Eastern and Southern Africa.
- "Blue Economy". Economic Development Board Mauritius.
- "Education". Economic Development Board Mauritius.
- "Financial Services". Economic Development Board Mauritius.
- "ICT". Economic Development Board Mauritius.
- "Mauritius-Africa Scholarship Scheme 2025 – Call for applications". Economic Development Board Mauritius. 2 October 2024.
- "Why Invest in Mauritius?". Economic Development Board Mauritius.
- Maritime Zones (EEZ Outer Limit Lines) Regulations 2024 (PDF) (Report). Government of Mauritius. 22 March 2024. Government Notice No. 50 of 2024 – via United Nations Division for Ocean Affairs and the Law of the Sea.
- "Exporting from the UK to Mauritius: a market guide". business.gov.uk. Department for Business and Trade.
- "The IOC General Secretariat". Indian Ocean Commission.
- "Ministerial Conference on Maritime Security: new agreements, actions and political commitment for regional Maritime Security" (PDF) (Press release). Indian Ocean Commission. 29 April 2018.
- "3rd Ministerial Conference on Maritime Safety and Security in the Western Indian Ocean: a common will to strengthen, deepen and broaden the Regional Maritime Security Architecture" (PDF) (Press release). Indian Ocean Commission. 20 November 2023.
- Indian Ocean Rim Association (2 November 2018). Charter of the Indian Ocean Rim Association (IORA) (PDF) (Report). IORA Secretariat. Annex II as amended on 25 October 2023.
- Jugnauth, Anerood (29 October 2015). Speech by the Prime Minister, Republic of Mauritius, plenary session of the Third India-Africa Forum Summit (PDF) (Speech). New Delhi – via Defimedia.
- Rohsler, Caron (5 December 2016). Address for Commonwealth Marine Economies Programme Workshop: Indian Ocean (Speech). Victoria, Seychelles: Foreign and Commonwealth Office.
- "Mauritius". Southern African Development Community.
- Statistics Mauritius (19 May 2026). Labour Force, Employment and Unemployment – Year 2025 (PDF) (Report). Economic and Social Indicators.
- UK Small Island Developing States strategy 2026 to 2030 (Report). Foreign, Commonwealth and Development Office. 13 January 2026.
- "FSC Mauritius signs IOSCO Multilateral Memorandum of Understanding on Exchange of Information" (PDF) (Press release). Financial Services Commission. 16 May 2012.
- "Mauritius – An OECD Compliant Jurisdiction" (PDF) (Press release). Financial Services Commission. 22 August 2017.
- Eastern and Southern Africa Anti-Money Laundering Group (September 2022). Anti-money laundering and counter-terrorist financing measures: Mauritius. 5th Enhanced Follow-up Report & Technical Compliance Re-Rating (PDF) (Report). Dar es Salaam: ESAAMLG.

=== Books and journals ===
- Ballgobin, Dehoutee Vina (2011). "Rivalité et consensus à l'île Maurice : établissements scolaires publics du Collège National au Royal College". Revue historique de l'océan Indien (in French) (7): 232–246.
- "Examination expansion overseas – extracts from 'Examining the World'" (Podcast). Cambridge Assessment. 22 November 2020. Archived from the original on 23 January 2026.
- Doorgakant, Yesha Devi Mahadeo (2017). The development of the linguistic repertoire of primary school learners within the Mauritian multilingual educational system (PhD thesis). University of KwaZulu-Natal.
- Fuma, Sudel (2011). "Les enjeux politiques des Britanniques aux îles Mascareignes au XIXe. La version du gouverneur Farquhar". Revue historique de l'océan Indien (in French) (7): 82–88.
- Gunputh, Rajendra Parsad (May–June 2022). "The Mauritian Legal System and Research". GlobaLex. Hauser Global Law School Program, New York University School of Law.
- Jeffery, Laura (2024). "Political and legal debates about Chagossian ethnicity and indigeneity". In Jeffery, Laura; Monaghan, C.; O'Gorman, M. (eds.). Challenges and Prospects for the Chagos Archipelago. Small State Studies. London: Routledge. doi:10.4324/9781003390299-10. Page numbers cited are those of the author's accepted manuscript in the Edinburgh Research Explorer.
- Maulloo, A. K.; Naugah, B. J. (2017). Upper secondary education in Mauritius: a case study (PDF) (Report). Royal Society.
- Monaghan, Nigel T. (2022). "Dodo remains in the National Museum of Ireland – Natural History, Dublin" (PDF). Journal of Natural Science Collections. 10. Natural Sciences Collections Association: 45–59.
- Newton, Alfred (1879). "January 14, 1879. Prof. Newton, M.A., F.R.S., V.P., in the Chair". Proceedings of the Zoological Society of London. 47 (1): 1–5. doi:10.1111/j.1096-3642.1879.tb02621.x. Newton's remarks on the Edinburgh specimen of the Mauritius blue pigeon are at pp. 2–3.
- Pyeneeandee, Nuckiren (2009). "La toponymie à l'île Maurice : le témoin d'un dialogue interculturel". Revue historique de l'océan Indien (in French) (5): 437–450.
- Paxton, John, ed. (1983). The Statesman's Year-Book 1983–84 (120th ed.). London: Macmillan.
- Paxton, John, ed. (1984). The Statesman's Year-Book 1984–85 (121st ed.). London: Macmillan.
- Paxton, John, ed. (1988). The Statesman's Year-Book 1988–89 (125th ed.). London: Macmillan.
- Paxton, John, ed. (1989). The Statesman's Year-Book 1989–90 (126th ed.). London: Macmillan.
- Hunter, Brian, ed. (1992). The Statesman's Year-Book 1992–93 (129th ed.). London: Macmillan.
- Hunter, Brian, ed. (1995). The Statesman's Year-Book 1995–96 (132nd ed.). London: Macmillan.
- Hunter, Brian, ed. (1996). The Statesman's Year-Book 1996–97 (133rd ed.). London: Macmillan.
- Hunter, Brian, ed. (1997). The Statesman's Year-Book 1997–98 (134th ed.). London: Macmillan.
- Toth, Anthony (1995). "Mauritius: Historical Setting". In Metz, Helen Chapin (ed.). Indian Ocean: Five Island Countries. Area Handbook Series (3rd ed.). Washington, D.C.: Federal Research Division, Library of Congress.
- "Maurice : dispositions linguistiques de lois diverses". L'aménagement linguistique dans le monde (in French). CEFAN, Université Laval.
- Warnett, Jason M.; Williams, Mark A.; Wilson, Paul F.; Smith, M. Paul (2021). "The Oxford Dodo. Seeing more than ever before: X-ray micro-CT scanning, specimen acquisition and provenance". Historical Biology. 33 (10): 2247–2255. doi:10.1080/08912963.2020.1782396.

=== News and other sources ===
- Ackbarally, Nasseem (14 October 2009). "Q&A: Small Sugar Farmers Not so Sweet on End of Sugar Protocol". Inter Press Service.
- "Mauritius declares emergency over oil spill, as Japanese shipowner apologises". South China Morning Post. Agence France-Presse and dpa. 8 August 2020.
- Arjanee, Ameerah (2 October 2026). "UK-Mauritius Chagos sovereignty deal stalls amid fears of further delays". Al Jazeera English.
- Brewster, David (11 December 2019). "Australia's stance on Diego Garcia dispute is increasingly untenable". The Interpreter. Lowy Institute.
- "Malta to host 2015 CHOGM after Mauritius pull-out". Daily FT. 18 November 2013.
- "Tris Bartlett, Director of the British Council: "UK universities have scholarships for Mauritian students"". News on Sunday. Le Défi Media Group. 18 November 2016.
- "Reception for Laureates 2018". News on Sunday. Le Défi Media Group. 5 April 2019.
- "MBC : Rs 25 à 30 millions pour la diffusion des événements sportifs locaux et internationaux". Le Défi Media (in French). Le Défi Media Group. 9 April 2025.
- "Mauritians in the UK celebrate Independence Day". News on Sunday. Le Défi Media Group. 25 March 2016.
- "Dossier Chagos : tête-à-tête entre Navin Ramgoolam et son homologue britannique, Andy Burnham" [Chagos file: one-to-one meeting between Navin Ramgoolam and his British counterpart, Andy Burnham]. Le Défi Media (in French). 5 November 2026.
- "Mauritius Independence Day". Embassy Network. 9 April 2019.
- Groëme-Harmon, Aline (24 January 2026). "Kreol Morisien : la langue nationale n'est plus recalée comme matière principale au HSC". L'Express (in French).
- Gulbul-Nathoo, Reshma (11 April 2024). "Arbitrages et dommages : les lourdes factures des décisions gouvernementales". L'Express (in French).
- Hydoo, Azmaal (1 September 2024). "Les Red Devils espèrent le réveil contre Liverpool !". L'Express (in French) – via AllAfrica.
- "Dossier – Award de Rs 5,7 milliards : la STC a jusqu'à mardi pour payer Betamax". L'Express (in French). 16 June 2021.
- "Résultats du HSC : jour J". L'Express (in French). 10 February 2026 – via AllAfrica.
- "Ile Maurice: Navin Ramgoolam et Andy Burnham visent une feuille de route d'ici décembre" [Mauritius: Navin Ramgoolam and Andy Burnham aim for a roadmap by December]. L'Express (in French). 5 November 2026 – via allAfrica.
- "COMMONWEALTH : Maurice n'accueillera pas le CHOGM 2015". Le Mauricien (in French). 16 November 2013.
- "Rama Sithanen : « La population paie cette irresponsabilité outrancière pour Betamax »". Le Mauricien (in French). 27 June 2021.
- "Hommage à Sir Satcam Boolell". Le Mauricien (in French). 11 September 2015.
- Lynch, David (14 February 2022). "UK 'in no doubt' over Chagos Islands after Mauritius plants flag". North Wales Live. PA Media.
- Lynch, David (5 November 2026). "Andy Burnham wants progress on Chagos Islands stalemate 'by the end of the year'". Express & Star. PA Media.
- Mallinder, Lorraine (11 February 2025). "'Tug of war': Chagos Islands deal tearing families apart in Mauritius". Al Jazeera English.
- "Govt's Proposed Court of Appeal: A Step Forward or a Risk to Justice?". Mauritius Times. 4 April 2025.
- "UK-ESA Economic Partnership Agreement comes into force". Mauritius Chamber of Commerce and Industry. 2021.
- Nancoo, Hansa (11 June 2026). "Lauréats 2025 : entre rêves d'ailleurs et attachement au pays". L'Express (in French).
- Nicholson, Paul (6 February 2015). "Man Utd dials in Emtel for content deal". Inside World Football.
- Pequenino, Karla (23 November 2016). "Dodo skeleton, 'icon of extinction,' sold for $431,000". CNN.
- Piper, Elizabeth (21 September 2026). "British PM Andy Burnham seeks resolution to dispute over Diego Garcia base". Reuters.
- Reisz, Matthew (24 May 2016). "Middlesex prepares for new Mauritian campus in 'education hub'". Times Higher Education.
- "Barclays to offload 7% stake in Barclays Africa". Retail Banker International. 4 December 2017.
- Revi, Vinitha (15 June 2024). "What is holding back the UK-Mauritius negotiations?". Observer Research Foundation.
- Riley, Henry (14 February 2025). "Chagossians beg to return to their homeland, as LBC visits their lunch club in Crawley". LBC.
- Salcedo, Dirk Andrei (9 January 2026). "Air Mauritius ruled out of Heathrow return before 2Q27". ch-aviation.
- Stacey, Kiran (5 November 2026). "Burnham wants to 'recast' Chagos Islands deal after US resistance". The Guardian.
- "Thousands of Chagossians would leave Crawley for homeland, says community leader". Sussex Express. 27 April 2016.
- Syal, Rajeev (1 September 2022). "Evicted Chagos Islanders' descendants to get British citizenship". The Guardian.
- Taylor, Lauren (18 March 2026). "Shelina Permalloo: Our world is changing – it's not always the 2.4 family". The Irish News. PA Media.
- Teelanah, Kishore (1 October 2018). "Founding a home in Britain – The Mauritian Experience". Mauritius Times.
- "Air Mauritius commits to extra flights from Europe". Travel Extra. 5 October 2026.
- Wallen, Joe (25 November 2021). "Britain's secret second Windrush scandal". The New European.
- Armoogum, Vilorsha (19 November 2025). "National Crime Agency : Des experts britanniques pour bâtir la future agence à Maurice". L'Express (in French).
- Bissessur, Prithvi (19 September 2026). "La future National Crime Agency évoquée". L'Express (in French) – via AllAfrica.
- "National Crime Agency Bill - Paul Bérenger : «Ramgoolam pe fini tou !»". Le Défi Media (in French). Le Défi Media Group. 20 September 2026.
- Frichot, Nicolas (14 December 2025). "Paul Brummell - «En matière d'intelligence artificielle, il s'agit pour le Royaume-Uni et Maurice d'apprendre ensemble»". L'Express (in French) – via AllAfrica.
- Hilbert, Patrick (17 September 2026). "National Crime Agency : la chasse au profil rare pour le poste de directeur général est lancée". Le Défi Media (in French). Le Défi Media Group.
- "NCA : le meilleur candidat, ou le candidat voulu ?". ION News (in French). 21 September 2026.
- "Un ex-limier de Scotland Yard à la tête de la National Crime Agency". L'Express (in French). 16 September 2026 – via AllAfrica.
- "National Crime Agency Bill : Le PM compare le projet à la création du FBI". Le Mauricien (in French). 30 August 2026.
- "National Crime Agency". Mauritius Times (Editorial). 28 September 2026.
- Bothwell, Ellie (7 February 2018). "Aberystwyth University's Mauritius campus loses £1 million". Times Higher Education.
- MacGregor, Karen (26 April 2014). "HE hub targets universities in France, India and UK". University World News.
- Mahadew, Bhavna (1 May 2026). "Strengthening Maritime Safety and Security in the Indian Ocean: The Case of Mauritius within the IORA Framework" (PDF). IORA-SA.
- "MCCI Hosts UK-Mauritius Business Networking Dinner". Mauritius Chamber of Commerce and Industry. 14 February 2025.
