= Nureyev (disambiguation) =

Rudolf Nureyev (1938–1993) was a ballet dancer and choreographer.

Nureyev may also refer to:

- Nureyev (surname), a surname (including a list of people with the name)
- Nureyev (ballet), a ballet
- Nureyev (crater), a crater on Mercury
- Nureyev (horse) (1977–2001), a Thoroughbred racehorse and champion sire
