= Tir Planitia =

Planitia on Mercury

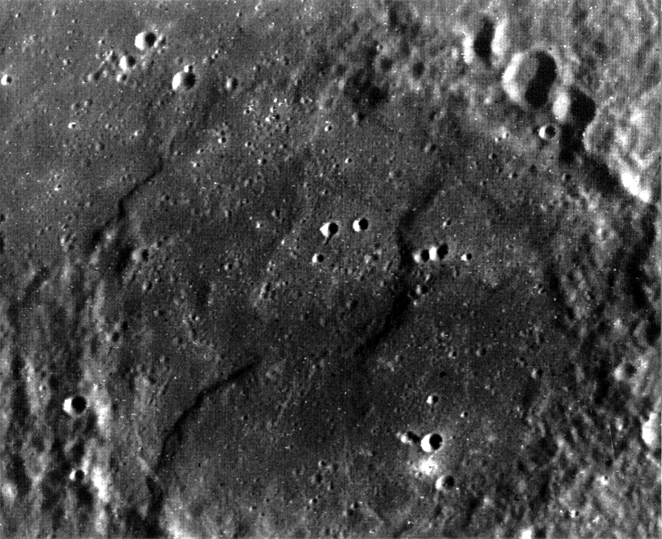
- Mariner 10 image showing scarps in the southeast Tir Planitia region of Mercury. These scarps may be volcanic flow features or compressional faults. The frame is about 130 km across.
- Location: Tolstoj quadrangle, Mercury
- Coordinates: 0.8°N 176.1°W
- Eponym: Persian word for Mercury

Tir Planitia is a large plain on the planet Mercury. The name Tir (تیر) is the Persian word for "Mercury", and the name was approved in 1976. It was first observed in detail by Mariner 10. It lies between the large crater Mozart and the ancient Tolstoj basin.

Tir Planitia is one of four named plains that surround the Caloris basin (with Mearcair Planitia, Stilbon Planitia, and Odin Planitia). All of these plains are classified as smooth, as opposed to intracrater plains which have rougher topography. They also contain areas where kilometer-scale knobs protrude above the plains, and these areas are called the Odin Formation. The Odin Formation is interpreted as a mixture of impact melt and blocky basin ejecta, formed by the Caloris impact event.

The crater Fet is near the center of Tir Planitia. Hovnatanian crater is southwest of Fet. The craters Amru Al-Qays and Nureyev are in northern Tir Planitia.

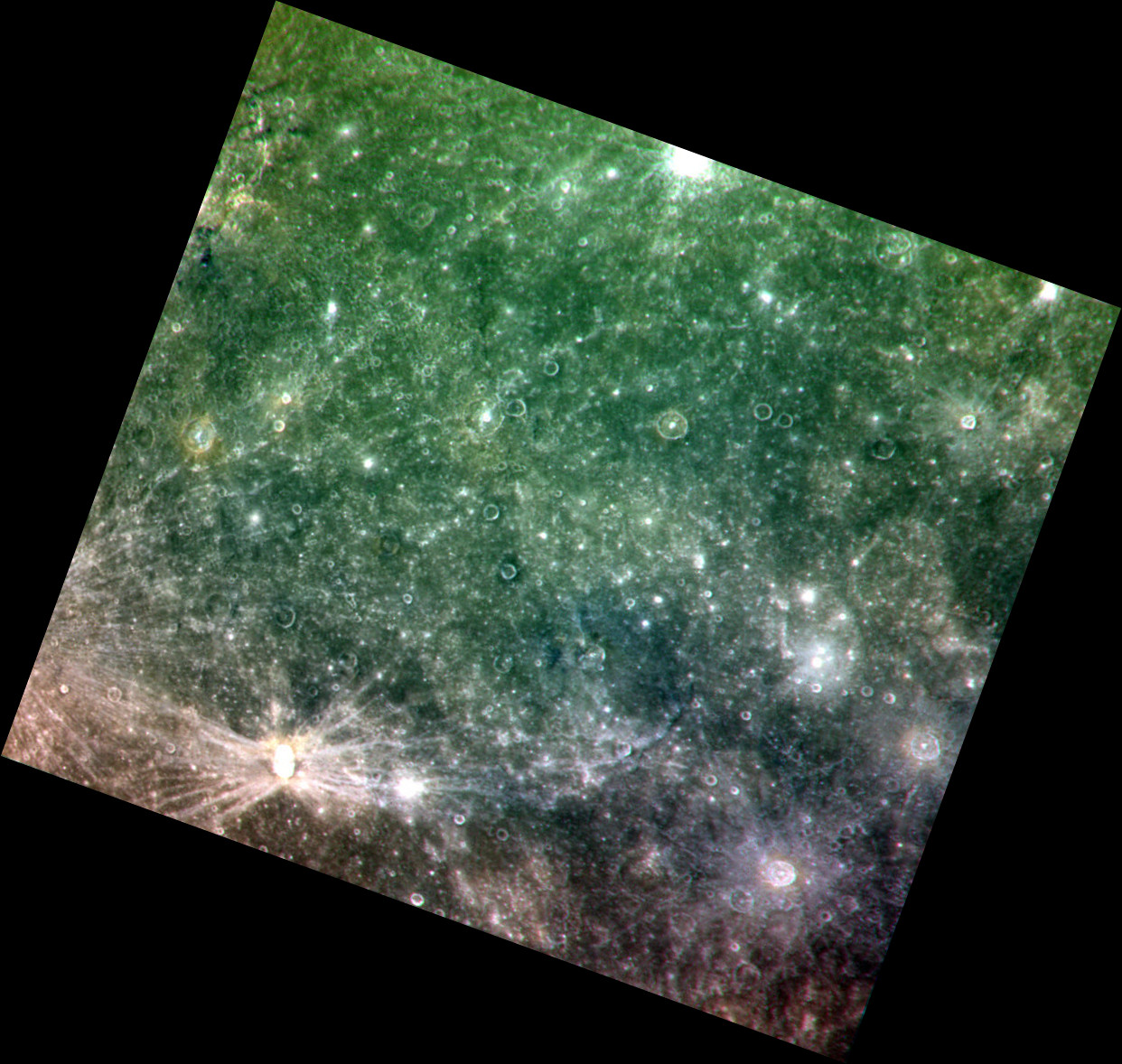
Exaggerated color image of part of Tir Planitia by MESSENGER. Hovnatanian crater is in lower left.

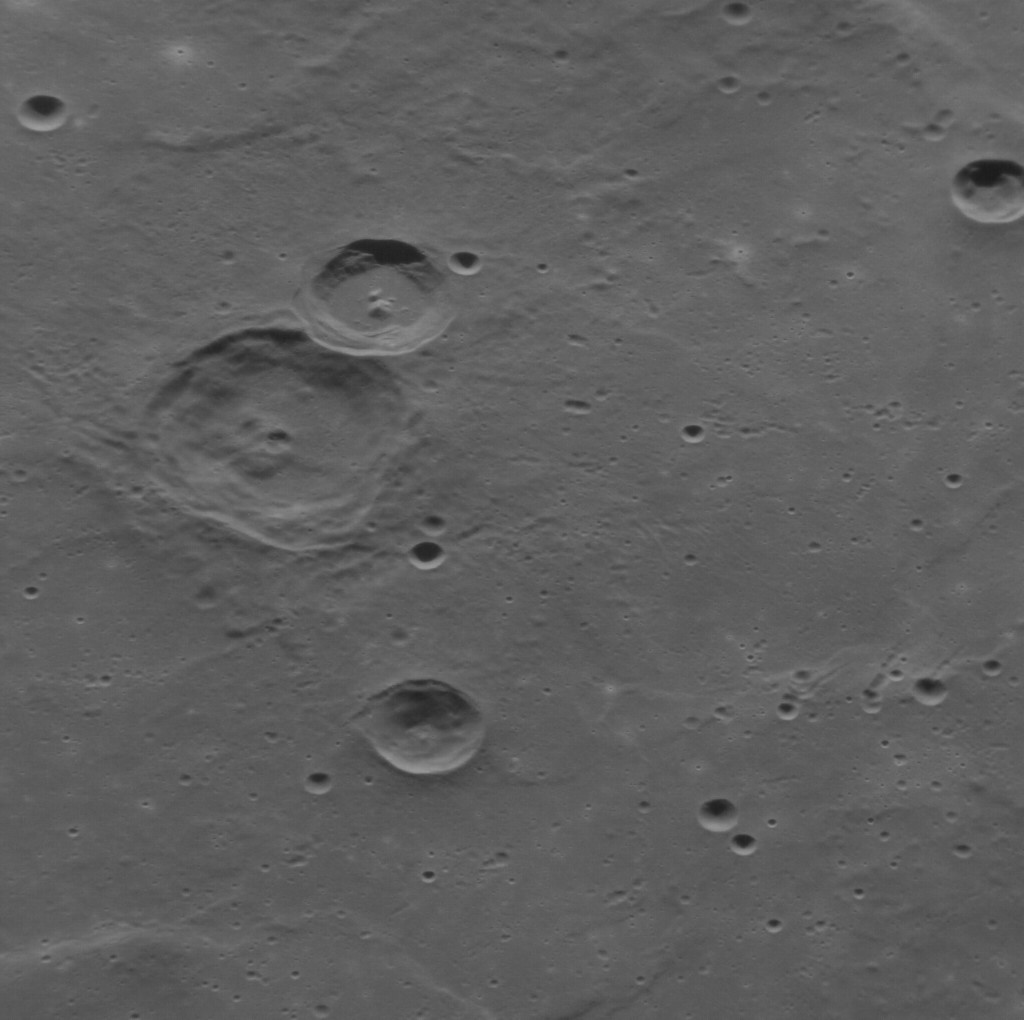
Oblique view of Fet crater (upper left) in Tir Planitia, showing the nature of the smooth plain
