= Stilbon =

Stilbon may refer to:

- Stilbon (mythology), originally meaning "the gleaming" (Στίλβων), was the ancient Greek name for the planet Mercury
  - Stilbon Planitia, plains in the north of the planet Mercury
- Stilpo (c. 360 – c. 280 BCE), Megarian philosopher, teacher of Pyrrho and Zeno of Citium
- Bindahara, alternatively Stilbon, a genus of butterflies in the family Lycaenidae
