= Mearcair Planitia =

Planitia on Mercury

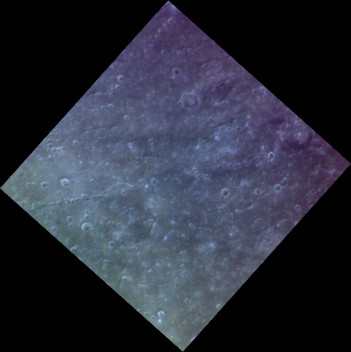
- Exaggerated color image of part of Mearcair Planitia, including Kerouac crater below left of center.
- Feature type: Planitia
- Location: Raditladi quadrangle, Mercury
- Coordinates: 31.4°N 227.9°W
- Eponym: Irish word for Mercury

Mearcair Planitia is a large plain on the planet Mercury. The name Mearcair is the Irish and Scottish Gaelic word for "Mercury", and the name was approved in 2017. It was first observed in detail by MESSENGER. It lies between the large crater Raditladi and the ancient Caloris basin.

Mearcair Planitia is one of four named plains that surround the Caloris basin (with Odin Planitia, Stilbon Planitia, and Tir Planitia). All of these plains are classified as smooth, as opposed to intracrater plains which have rougher topography. They also contain areas where kilometer-scale knobs protrude above the plains, and these areas are called the Odin Formation. The Odin Formation is interpreted as a mixture of impact melt and blocky basin ejecta, formed by the Caloris impact event.

The large crater Kerouac lies near the center of Mearcair Planitia.
