= Hakob Hovnatanyan =

Armenian artist (1806–1881)

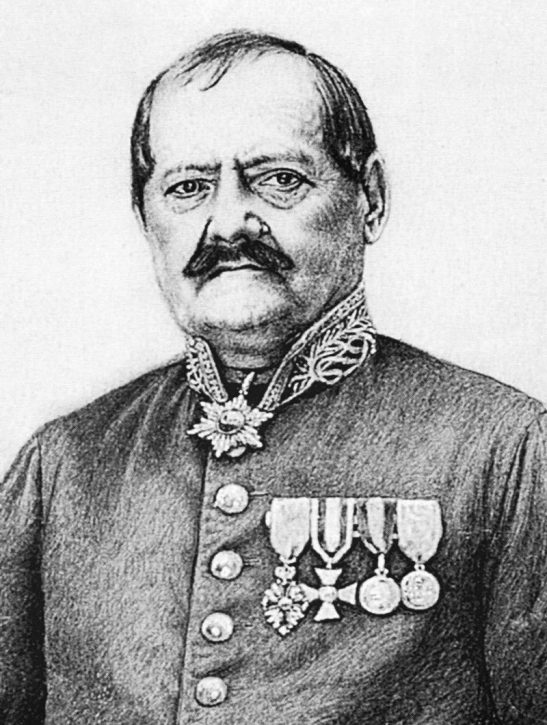
Hakob Hovnatanyan (1806—1881), a representative of the last generation of Hovnatanyans.

Hakob Hovnatanyan (Armenian: Հակոբ Մկրտումի Հովնաթանյան; 1806–1881) was an Armenian artist. He was a member of the Hovnatanyan family, a miniaturists dynasty from the 17th to the 19th centuries. Hacob Hovantanyan who was also called “The Raphael of Tiflis”, was the founder of the modern Armenian painting school and one of the masters in portraiture, illustration and miniature.

== Life ==
Hakob Hovnatanyan was the fifth generation from the Hovnatanian family. He succeeded the patriarch of the family Naghash Hovnatan (1661–1722), a famous poet and painter. Naghash lived in the Caucasus during the Safavid era. Hovnatanyan received his training from Mkrtum Hovnatanyan, his father, and painted the walls of some churches with his father in Armenia and Tiflis in his youth.

His widespread fame began when he was awarded the golden medal from Saint Petersburg Art organization in 1841. After that, he was notably considered by Georgian media. His masterpieces were created from 1840 to 1850. He achieved an accomplished technique as a portraitist in this era and portraits of princes, the clergy and rich people were the main subjects of his works. Georgian-born Armenian film director Sergei Parajanov made a short art film about him in 1967 entitled Hakob Hovnatanyan.

== Moving to Iran ==
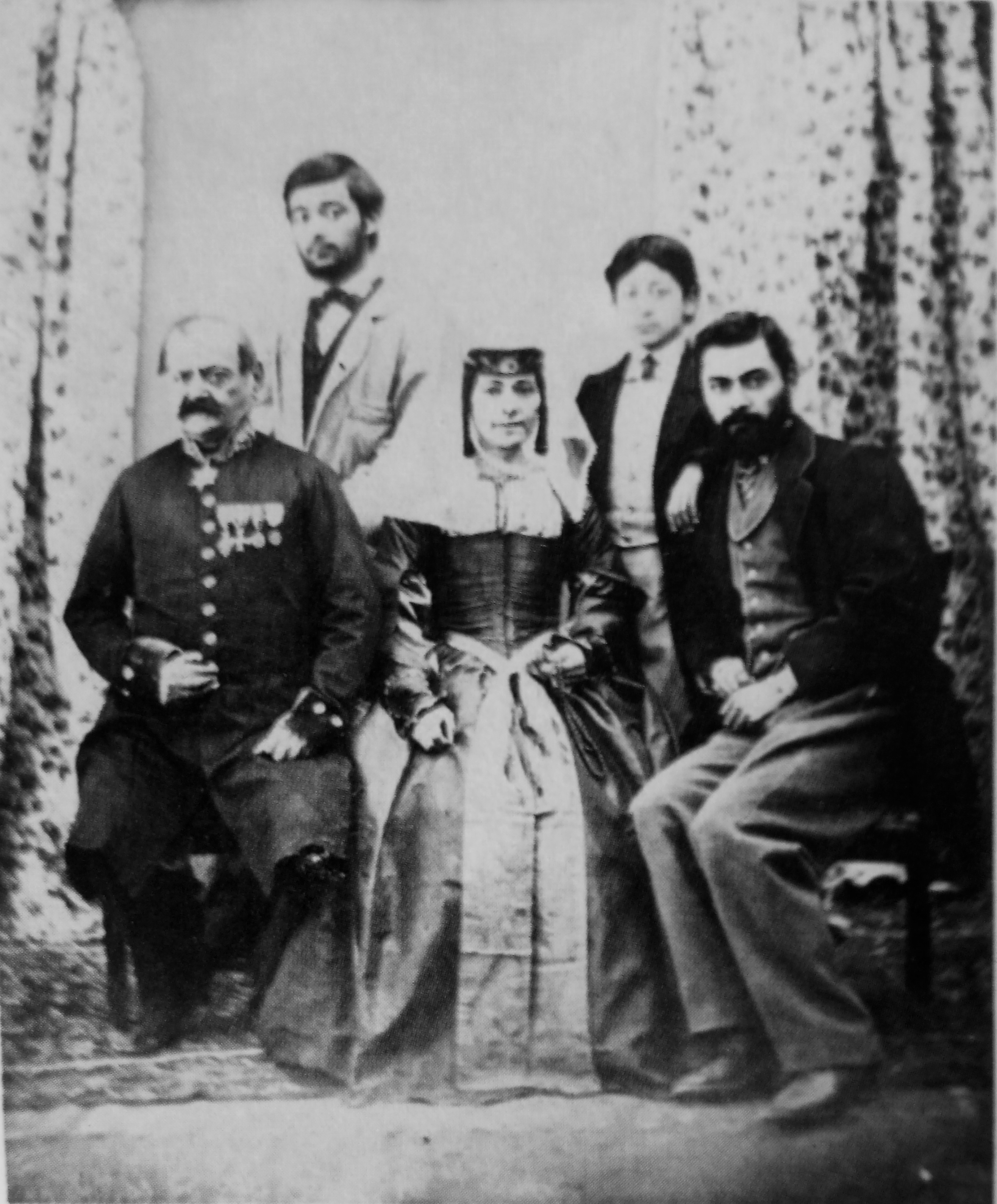
Hakob Hovnatanian with his family, 1860s

He became interested in Persian art, new to him and the people of the Caucasus, later in life. He moved to Iran because of the recession in Tiflis and to acquire new experiences. He went to his daughter's home in Tabriz and after one year moved to Tehran and went to the court of Naser al-Din Shah Qajar. Shortly thereafter, he was awarded a Courtesy title as an honourific scientific sign and also the name of Naghshbashi, which means master of painters. He remained in Iran until his death in 1881 and was buried in Saint George Church of Tehran.

== His masterpieces in Iran ==
Among of his works done in Iran two works are considered remarkable. The portrait of Ali Ibn Abi Talib and the portrait of Naser al-Din Shah Qajar.

== Legacy ==
A crater on the planet Mercury is named after Hakob Hovnatanian.

== Selected portraits ==
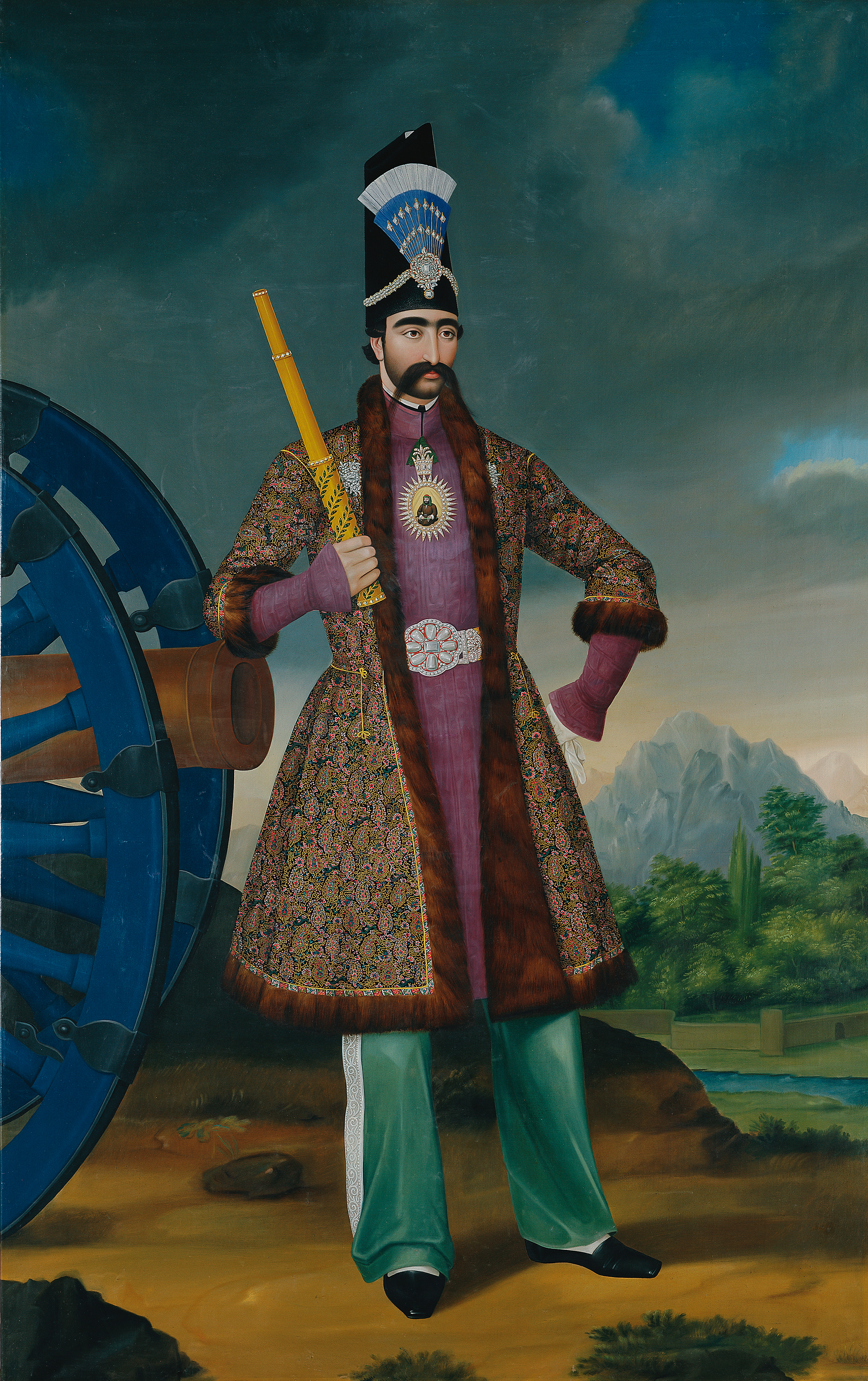
Naser al-Din Shah Qajar

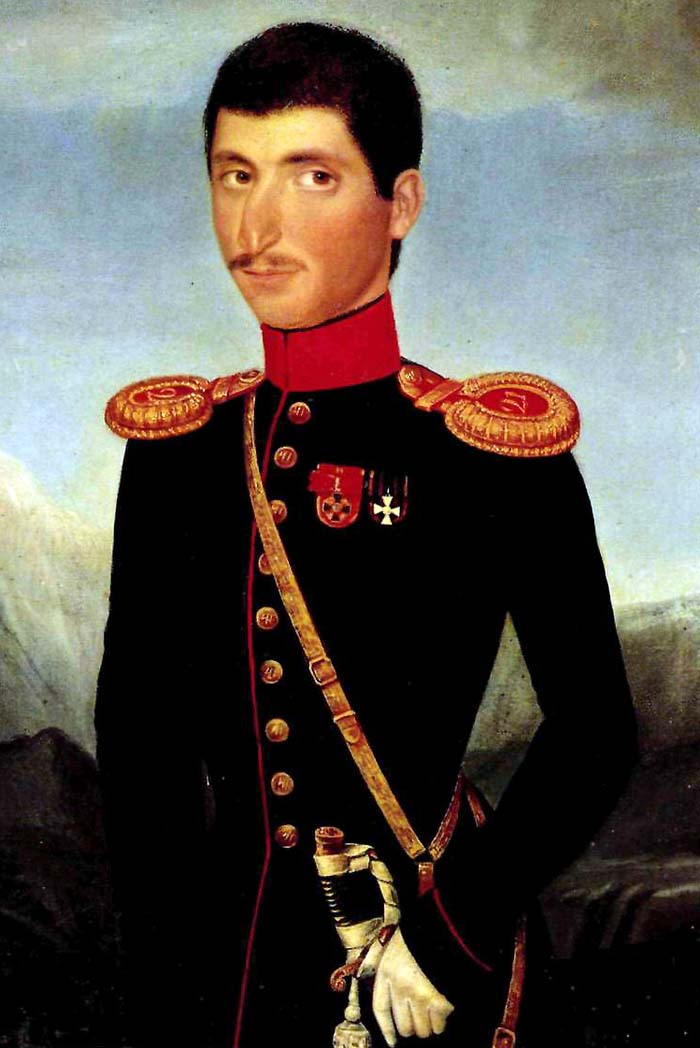
Captain M.B. Buchkiev (1854)

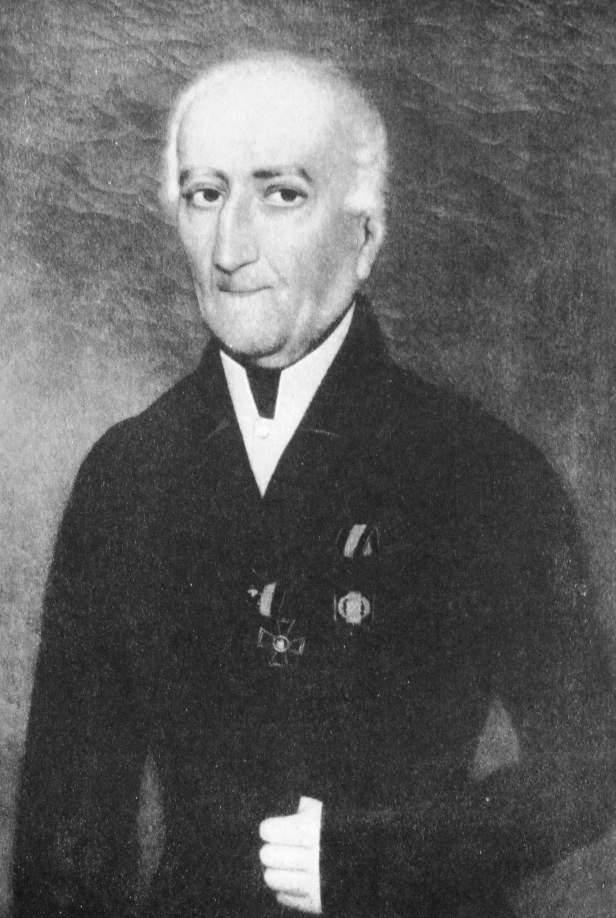
Portrait of a Freemason

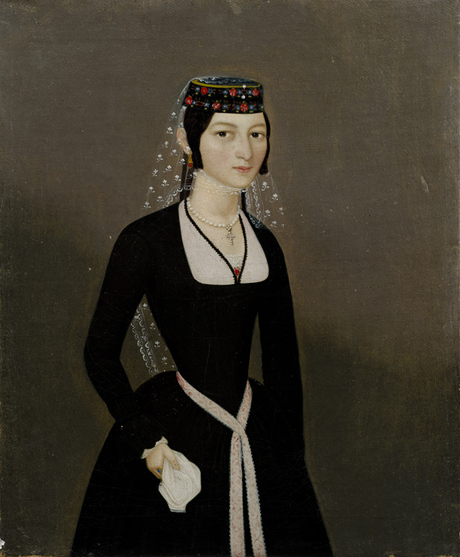
Natali Teumian

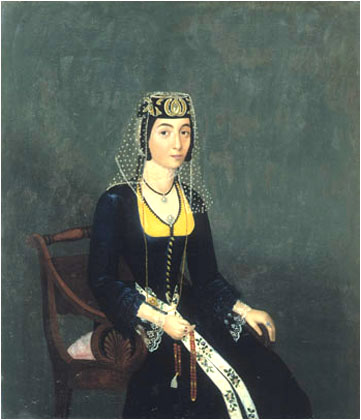
Princess Melikov

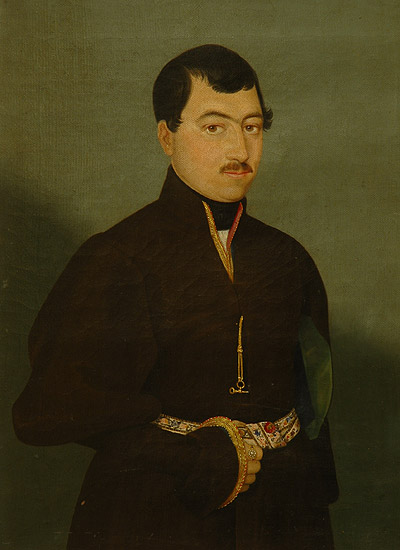
Unidentified (Karagyan family?)

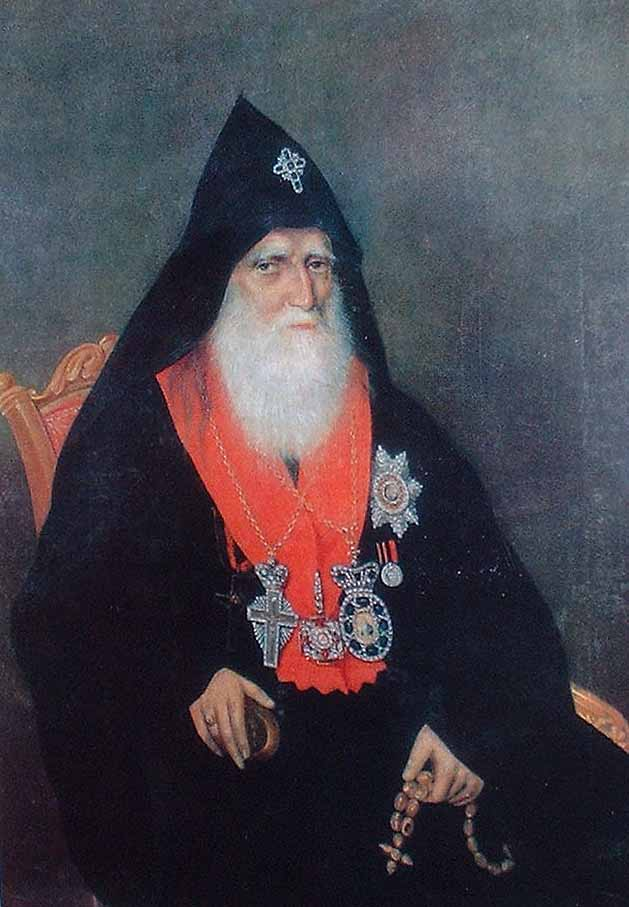
Nerses V

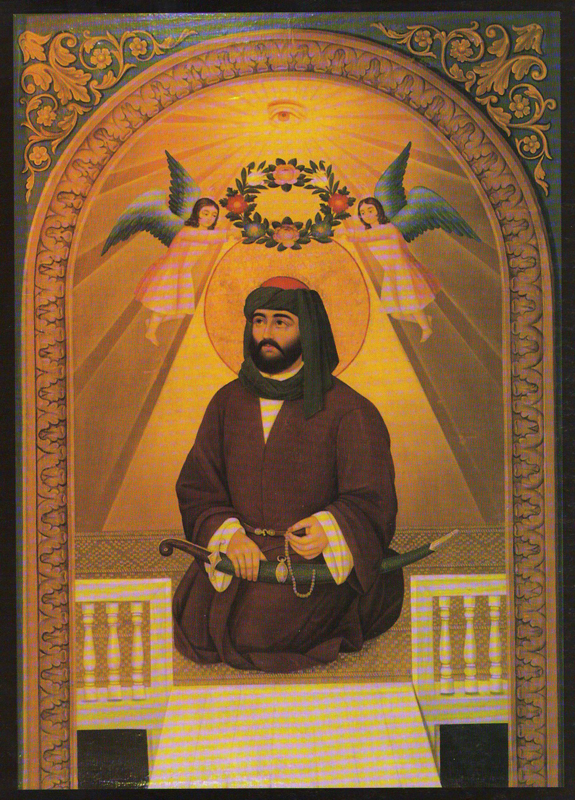
Ali ibn Abi Talib

== Sources ==
- Biography @ Armeniapedia
- http://library.thinkquest.org/C003796/gather/hhovnatanian.html
