= Hovnatanian (crater) =

Crater on Mercury

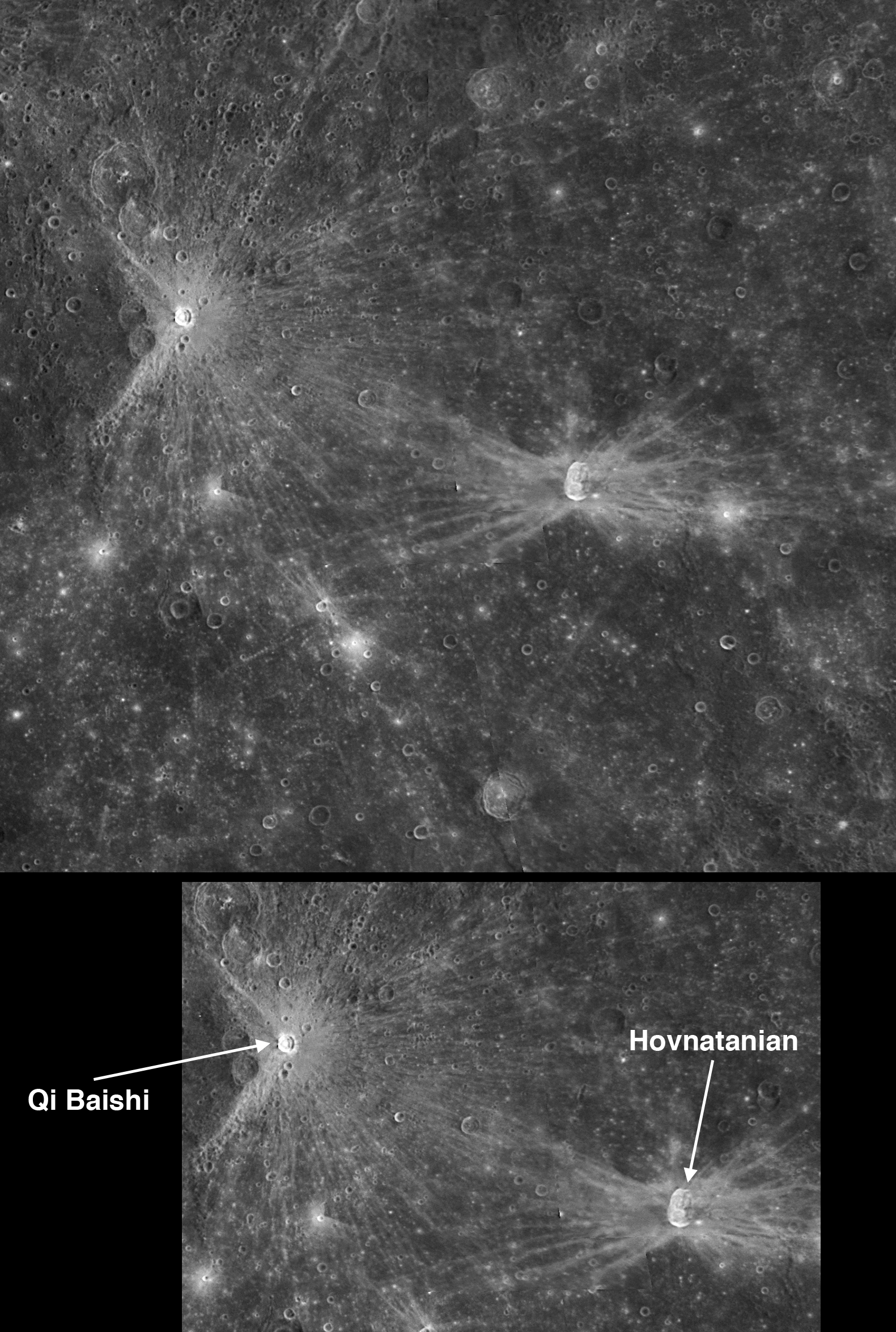
- Feature type: Impact crater
- Location: Tolstoj quadrangle, Mercury
- Coordinates: 7.68°S 187.29°W
- Diameter: 34 km (21 mi)
- Eponym: Hakob Hovnatanyan

Hovnatanian is a crater on Mercury. Its “butterfly” pattern of ejecta rays were created by an impact at an even lower angle than that which formed neighboring Qi Baishi crater. From the "butterfly" pattern of rays (similar to Messier crater on the Moon), the Hovnatanian impactor was travelling either north-to-south or south-to-north prior to hitting Mercury's surface. Hovnatanian lies to the west of Tir Planitia.

The crater was named in 2008 for Hakob Hovnatanyan, a 19th-century Armenian artist.

== Views ==
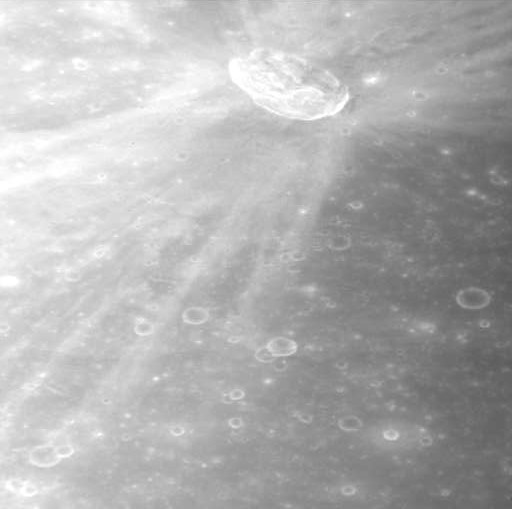
MESSENGER image showing the bright crater floor and some of the extent of the rays

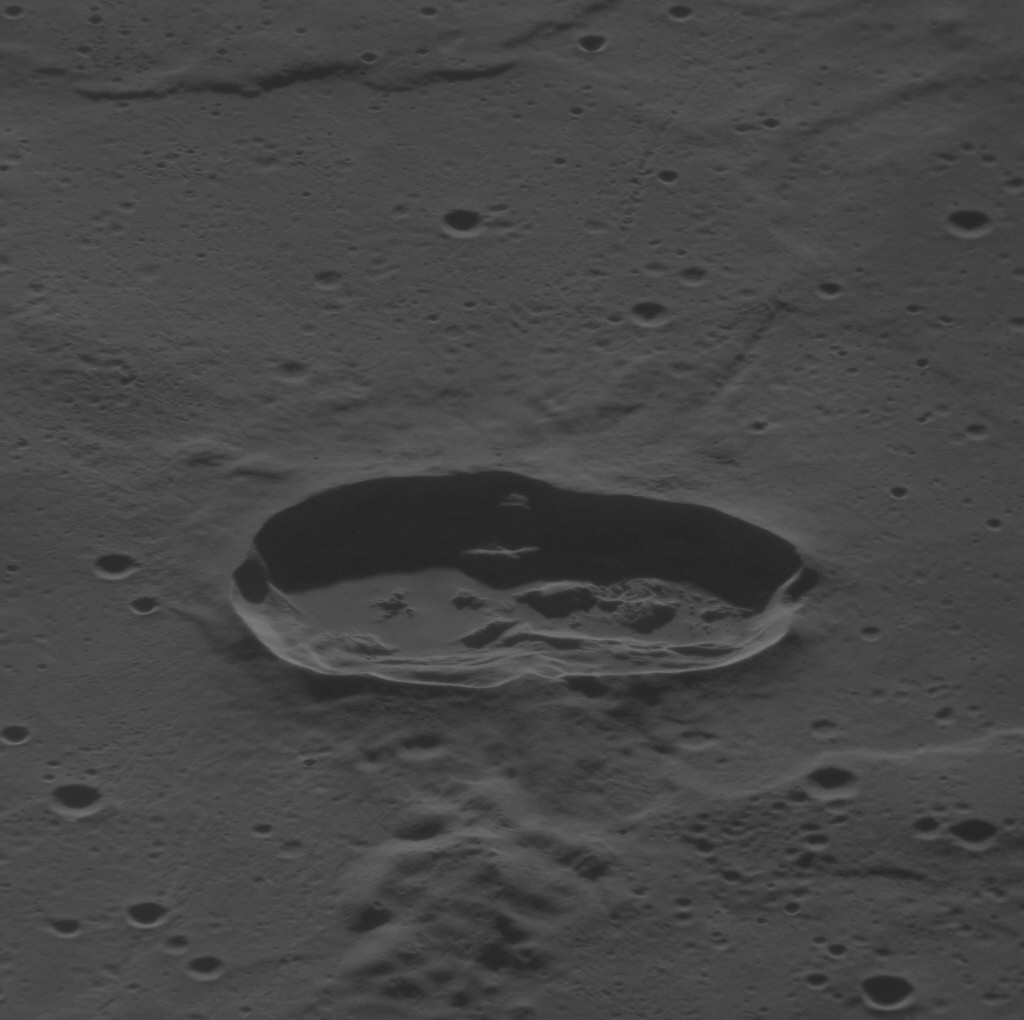
Oblique MESSENGER image at a low sun angle
