= Oskison (crater) =

Crater on Mercury

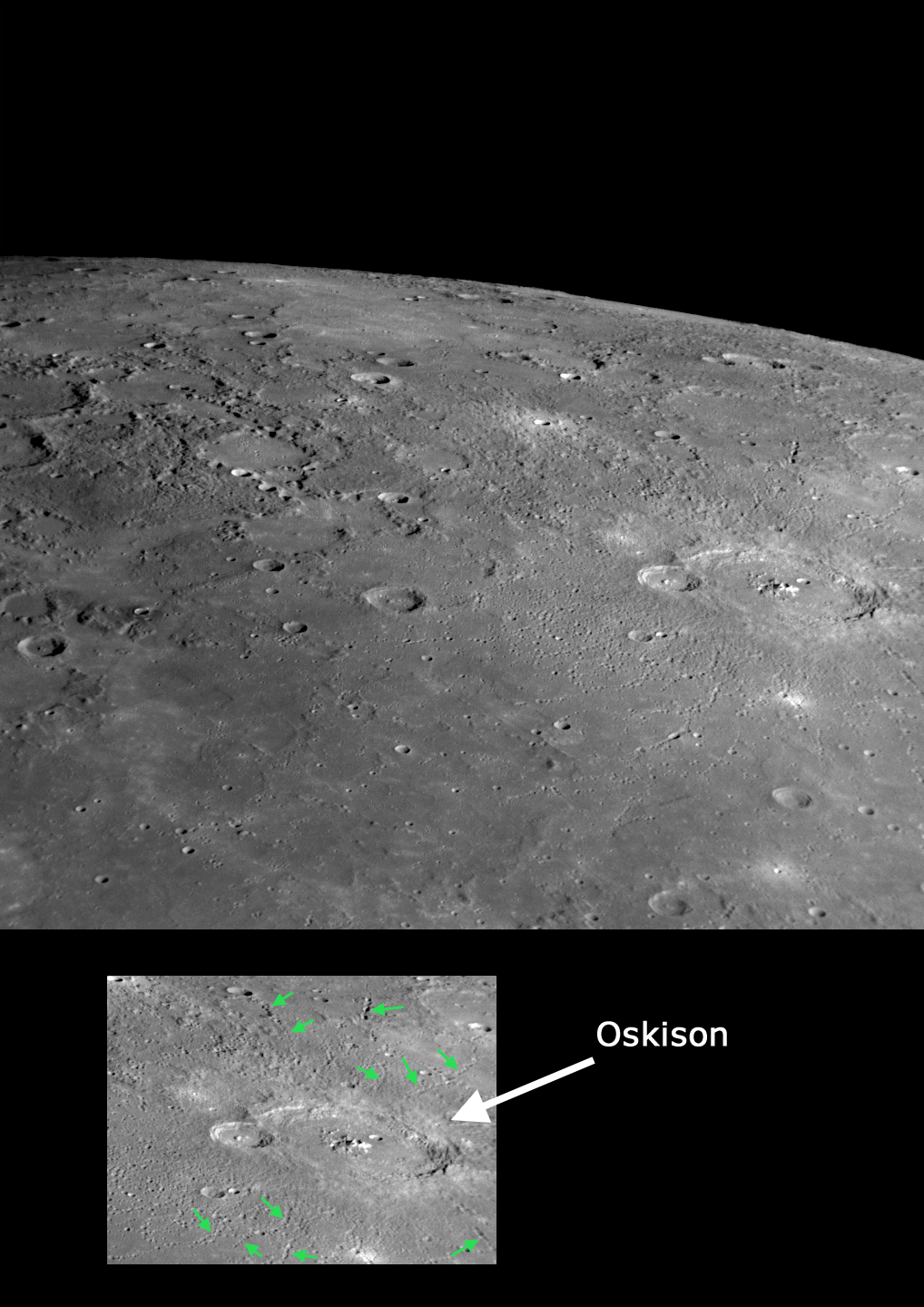
- MESSENGER image of Oskison crater. The lower image highlights some of its secondary crater chains.
- Feature type: Impact crater
- Location: Raditladi quadrangle, Mercury
- Coordinates: 60.36°N 214.76°W
- Diameter: 122 km (76 mi)
- Eponym: John Milton Oskison

The crater Oskison is located in the far northern hemisphere of Mercury, in the plains north of Caloris basin. Oskison is a distinctive crater with a large central peak that exposes material excavated from depth. Many chains of secondary craters are visible radiating from Oskison outward onto the surrounding smooth plains, known as Stilbon Planitia.

Oskison was named after Cherokee author John Milton Oskison in 2008.

The crater Navoi is to the east of Oskison.

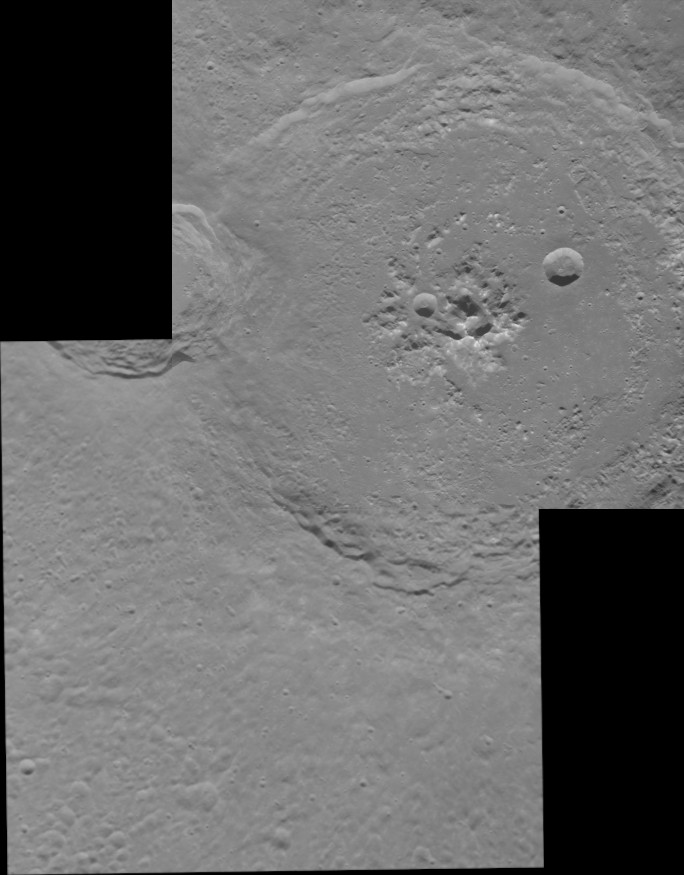
Oskison crater

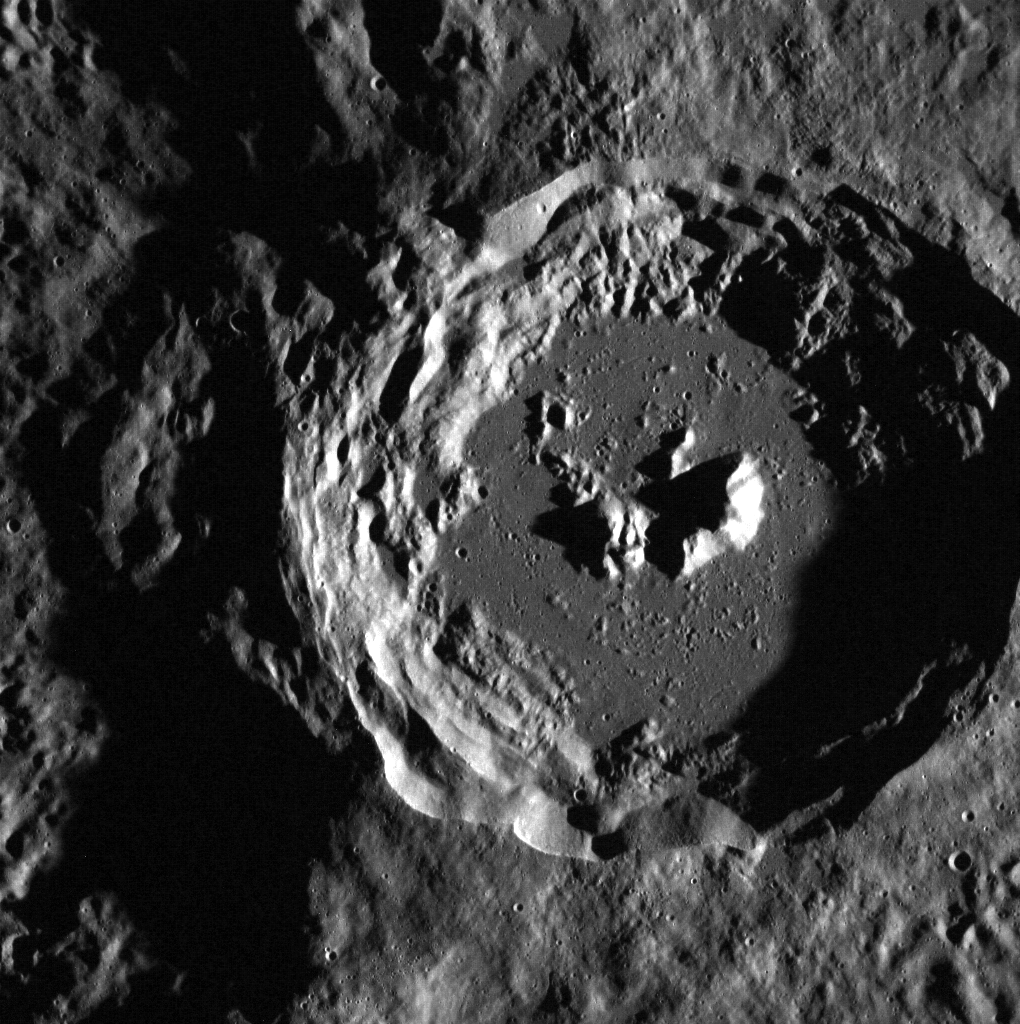
Smaller crater on the west rim of Oskison

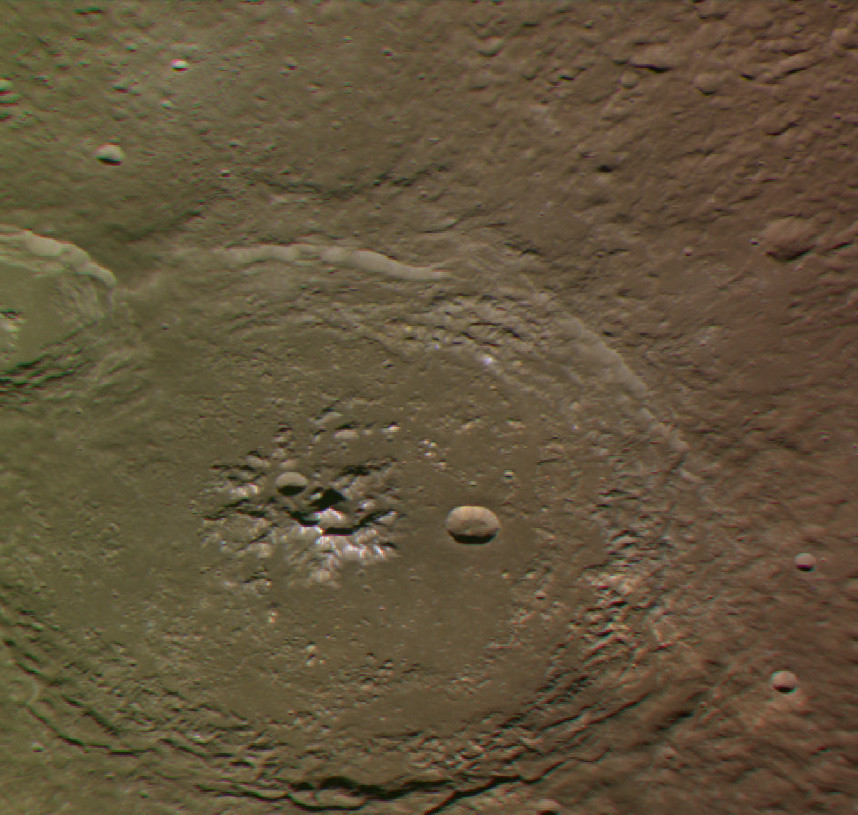
Exaggerated color view of Oskison crater, looking northwest
