= Kerouac (crater) =

Crater on Mercury

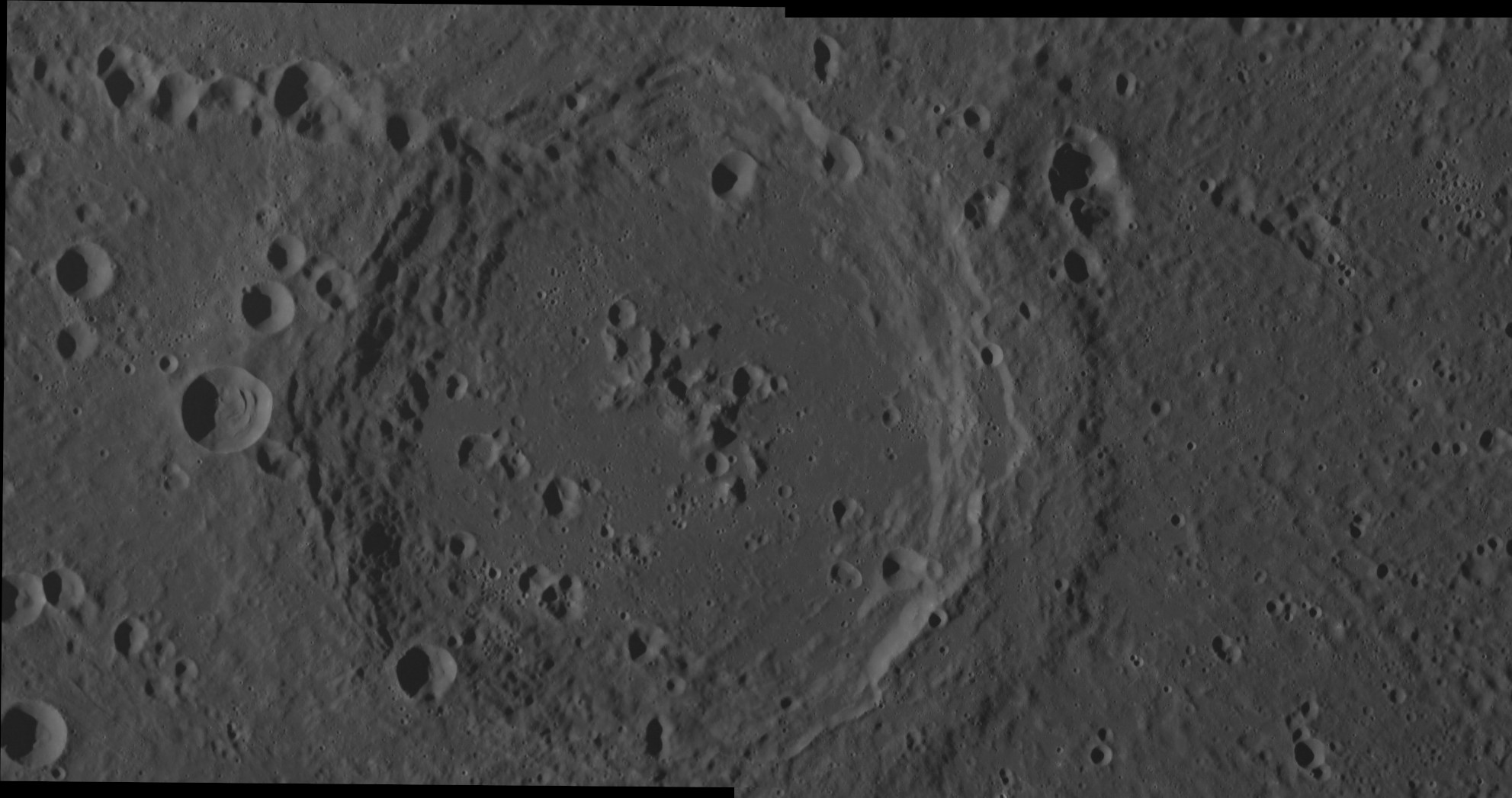
- MESSENGER WAC mosaic
- Planet: Mercury
- Coordinates: 25.21°N 230.9°W
- Quadrangle: Raditladi
- Diameter: 110 km (68 mi)
- Eponym: Jack Kerouac

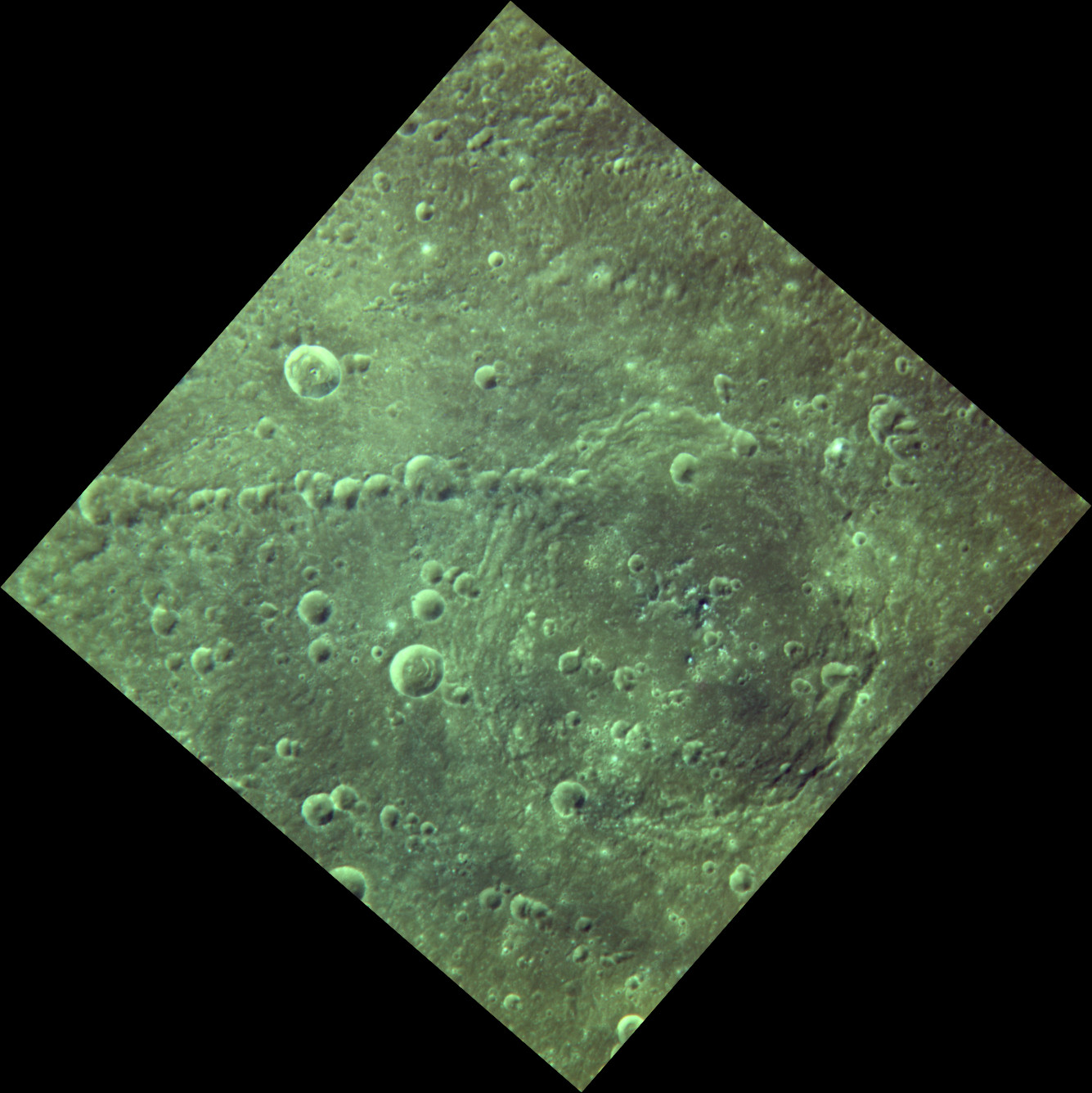
Exaggerated color image of Kerouac at a high sun angle.

Kerouac is a crater on Mercury. Its name was adopted by the International Astronomical Union (IAU) in 2015, after American author and poet Jack Kerouac.

Kerouac is located west of the Caloris Planitia, within Mearcair Planitia. To the west of Kerouac is the peak ring basin Raditladi.
