= Qi Baishi (crater) =

Crater on Mercury

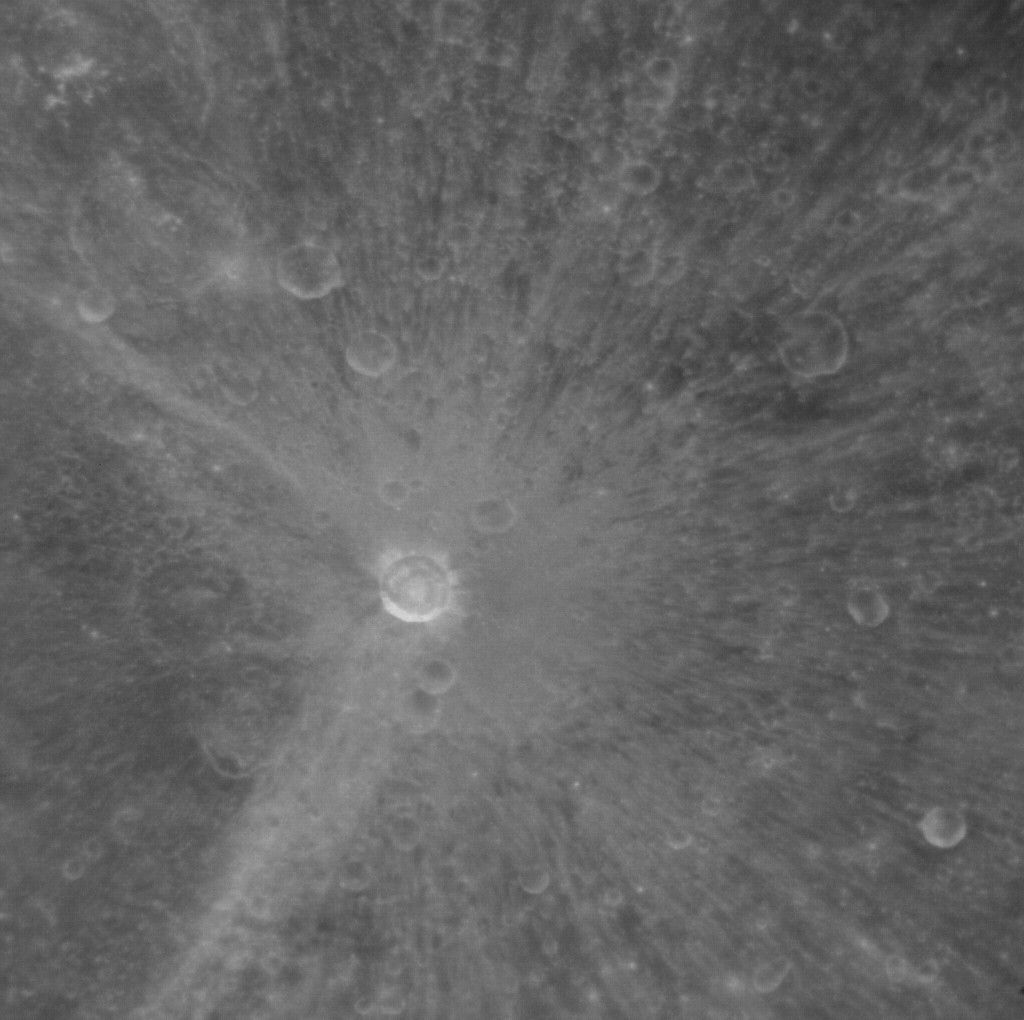
- MESSENGER image showing the rays of Qi Baishi
- Feature type: Impact crater
- Location: Tolstoj quadrangle, Mercury
- Coordinates: 4.2°S 196.0°W
- Diameter: 16 km (9.9 mi)
- Eponym: Qi Baishi

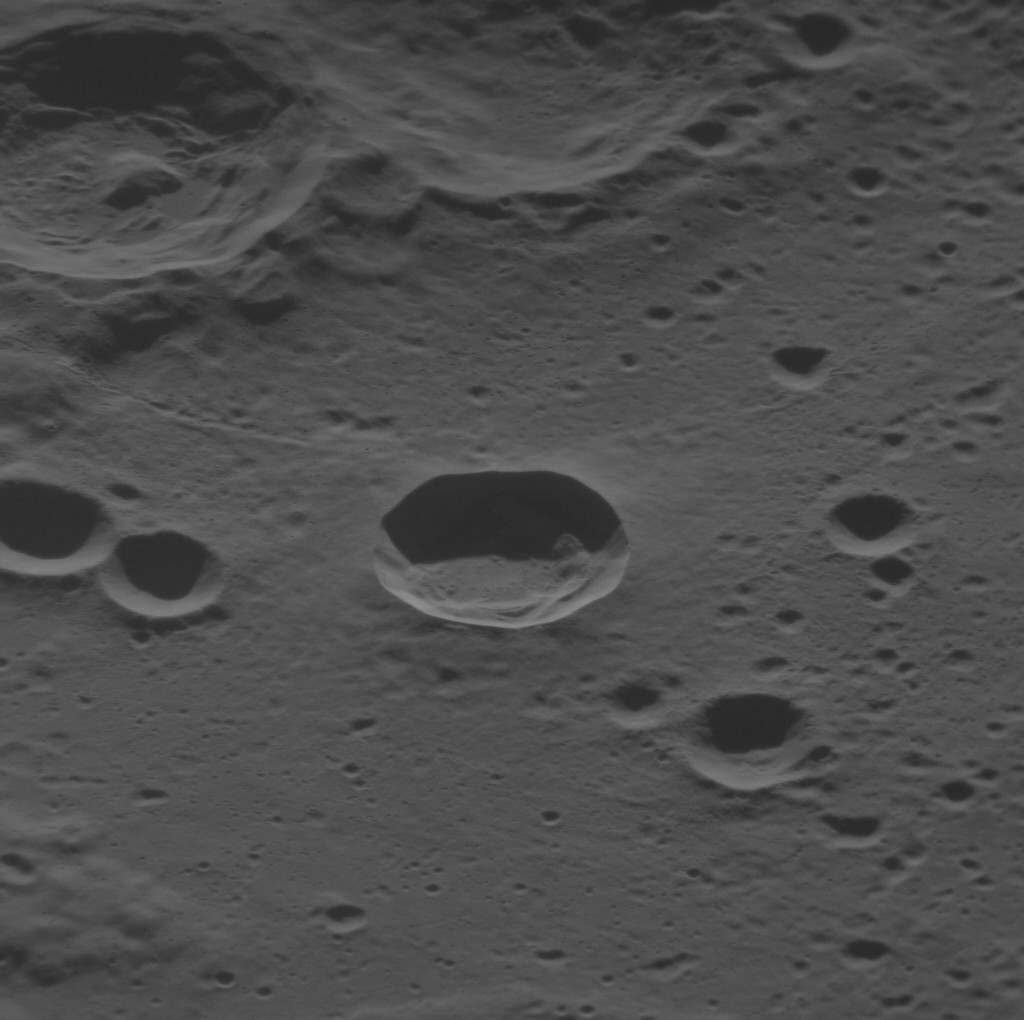
Oblique view at low sun angle showing detail of the crater's interior

Qi Baishi is a crater on Mercury. The crater was named after famed Chinese painter Qi Baishi. The crater has an asymmetric pattern of ejecta rays, which formed by an object traveling to the east or to the west and impacting Mercury's surface at a very low incidence angle. However, Qi Baishi crater is still roughly circular, which is in contrast to the elongated shape of neighboring Hovnatanian crater.

Qi Baishi was named by the IAU on Nov 20, 2008.
