= Amru Al-Qays =

Crater on Mercury

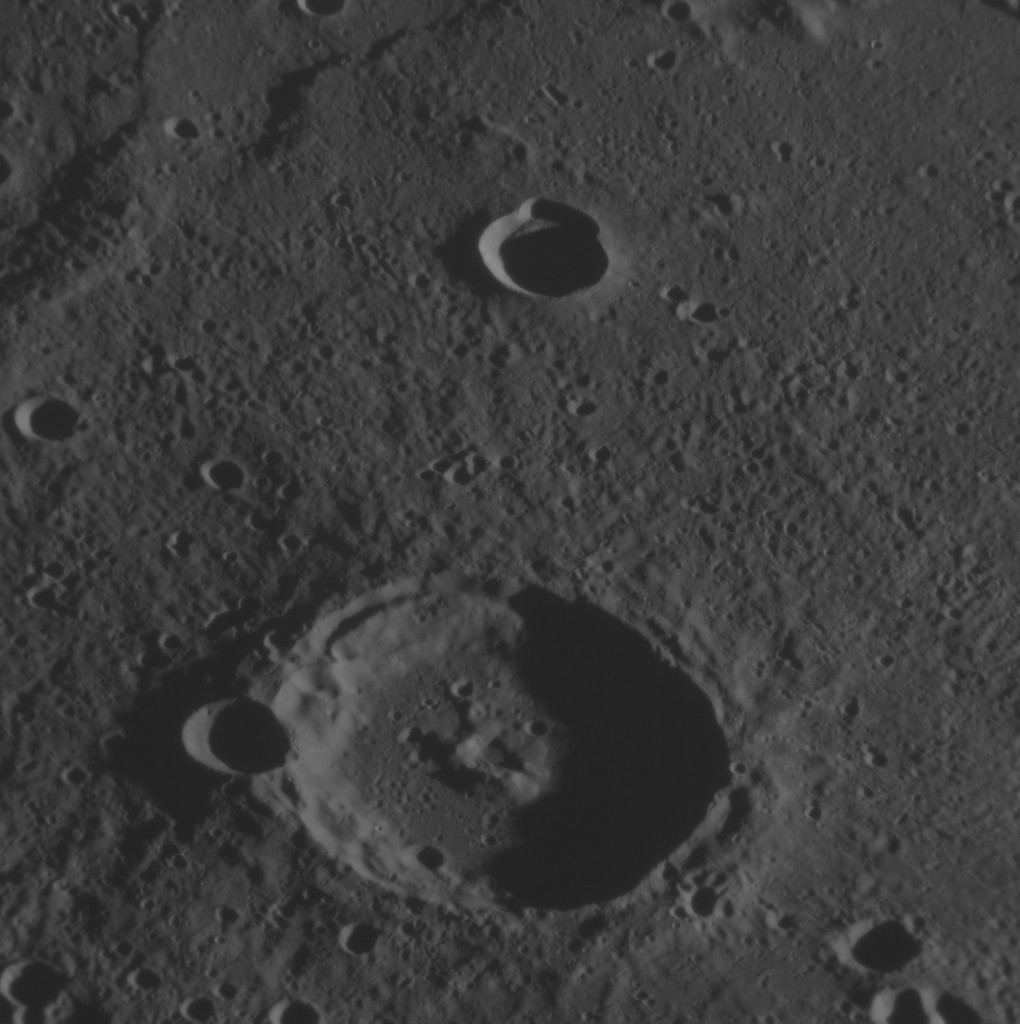
- Oblique MESSENGER NAC image
- Feature type: Impact crater
- Location: Tolstoj quadrangle, Mercury
- Coordinates: 12.43°N 176.11°W
- Diameter: 47 km (29 mi)
- Discoverer: Mariner 10
- Eponym: Imru' al-Qais

Amru Al-Qays is a crater on Mercury. The crater was first imaged by Mariner 10 in 1974. Its name was adopted by the IAU in 1976, after the pre-Islamic Arab poet Imru' al-Qais in honor of his impact on astronomy and the world.

Amru Al-Qays is west of Nureyev crater, and both are located southeast of the Caloris basin in northern Tir Planitia.

== Views ==
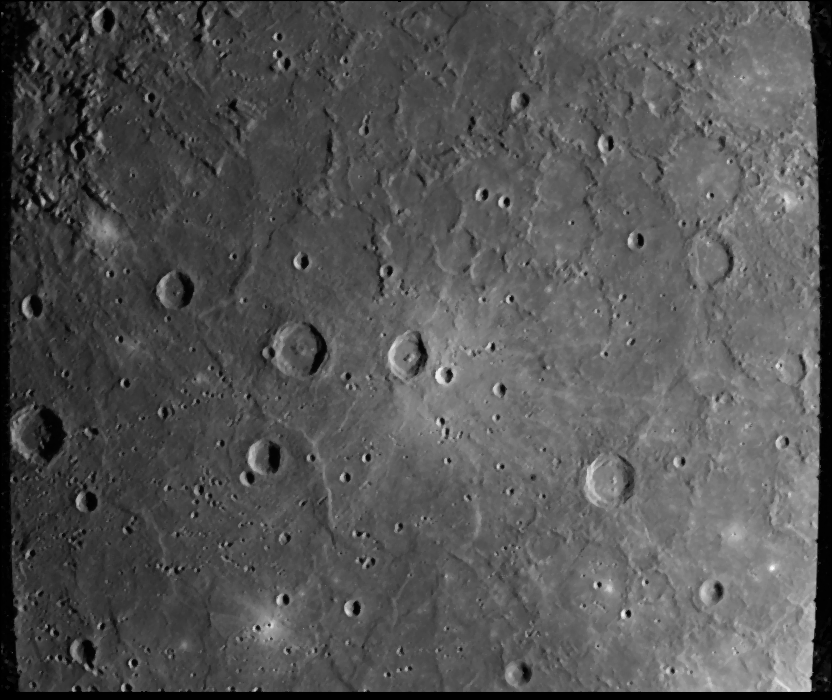
Mariner 10 image with Amru Al-Qays left of center

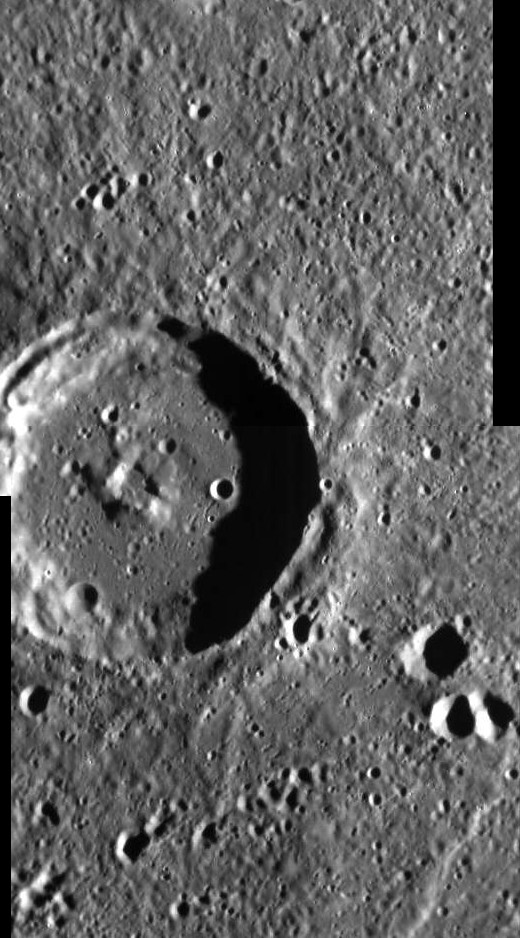
MESSENGER NAC mosaic
