= John Milton Oskison =

- Oklahoma Historical Society photograph
- Born: September 21, 1874 in or near Vinita, Cherokee Nation, Indian Territory
- Died: February 25, 1947 (aged 72); Tulsa, Oklahoma
- Education: Willie Halsell College, Stanford University
- Spouse(s): Florence Ballard Day; Hildegarde Hawthorne
- Children: 2
- Writing career
- Genres: novel, biography
- Subjects: Oklahoma, Texas, Native Americans

John Milton Oskison (1874–1947) was a Native American writer, editor and journalist. His fiction focused on the culture clash that mixed-bloods like himself faced.

== Early life and career ==
Oskison was born the son of John (English) and Rachel Crittendon (Cherokee Nation) Oskison in Cherokee Nation. He attended Willie Halsell College in Vinita, where he met and befriended Will Rogers.

Oskison was an undergraduate at Stanford, where he was president of the Stanford Literary Society. He graduated in 1898, and was Stanford's first Native American graduate. He attended Harvard for graduate school. But after one year, his short story "Only the Master Shall Praise" won a competition held by The Century Magazine, and he became a professional writer.

He became an editorial writer for the New York Evening Post. He married Florence Ballard Day in 1903. In 1904 his short story "The Greater Appeal" won the Black Cat Prize.

== Later life and career ==
Oskison switched to Collier's Weekly in 1907, and became their financial editor in 1910.

Oskison served with the American Expeditionary Force in World War I. In 1920, still in France, he and his wife divorced. On his return to the U. S., Oskison married Hildegarde Hawthorne, a novelist. He did not resume his position with Collier's, but instead became an independent writer.

Oskison wrote four novels, one novelized biography (of Sam Houston), one history with commentary (on Tecumseh), and part of an autobiography. During the Depression, he edited a WPA project on Oklahoma. At the time of his death, his fourth novel and his partial autobiography were in manuscript form only. His daughter donated Oskison's papers to the University of Oklahoma. His papers were rediscovered in 2007, and were subsequently published.

== Publications ==
- Wild Harvest. D. Appleton. 1925.
- Black Jack Davy. D. Appleton. 1926.
- Brothers Three. Macmillan. 1935. hdl:2027/uc1.$b57132.
- A Texan Titan: The Story of Sam Houston. Doubleday. 1935.
- Tecumseh and his Times: The Story of a Great Indian. G. B. Putnam's. 1938. hdl:2027/uc1.$b59303.
- (edited, with Angie Debo) (1941). Oklahoma: A Guide to the Sooner State. University of Oklahoma Press.
- Timothy B. Powell; Melinda Smith Mullikin, eds. (2007). The Singing Bird. University of Oklahoma Press. ISBN 978-0-8061-3818-3.
- Lionel Larré, ed. (2012). Tales of the Old Indian Territory and Essays on the Indian Condition. University of Nebraska Press. ISBN 978-0-8032-3792-6.

== Tributes ==
In 1995, Stanford established the John Milton Oskison Writing Competition, held annually.

In 2008, a crater on Mercury was named after him.
