= Caloris Montes =

Montes on Mercury

- Feature type: Montes
- Location: Mercury
- Coordinates: 39.4°N 187.2°W
- Peak: 3 km (1.9 mi) 9,843 ft (3,000 m)

The Caloris Montes /kəˈlɔːrɪs ˈmɒntiːz/ (Latin for "Heat's Mountains") are a range of mountains on Mercury. They are a system of linear hills and valleys that extend more than 1000 km to the northeast from the mountainous rim of Caloris Basin in the Shakespeare quadrangle (H-3). The range consists of numerous rectilinear massifs 1 to 3 km high and about 10 to 50 km long, mostly elongated radially from the center of the basin and separated by hackly-floored, radial troughs and gouge-like structures.

The surfaces of the massifs are hackly. They are best developed along the inner edge of the basin where steep inward-facing scarps are common, grading outward into smaller massifs and blocks. The range marks the crest of most prominent ring structure around Caloris. The type area is the region near 18°, 184.5° (FDS 229). It is thought to be composed of uplifted prebasin bedrock covered by deep-seated late ejecta from Caloris. The inner boundary is approximately the outer limit of crater excavation.

The Caloris Montes are similar to the so-called Imbrium sculpture on the Moon. It is generally believed that this type of lineated surface feature resulted from excavations by secondary projectiles when the large basins were formed and, possibly, fracturing and faulting of the planet's crust during the basin formation. The Caloris Montes are only the innermost formation of the Caloris Group of formations produced by the Caloris Basin impact.

A gap is present in the Caloris Montes toward the southeast; its origin is unknown, but it is somewhat similar to the gap on the east side of the Imbrium Basin, where the mountain ring cuts the edge of the Serenitatis Basin. On Mercury, however, there is no evidence for the presence of a preexisting basin east of Caloris.
