= Mansur (crater) =

Crater on Mercury

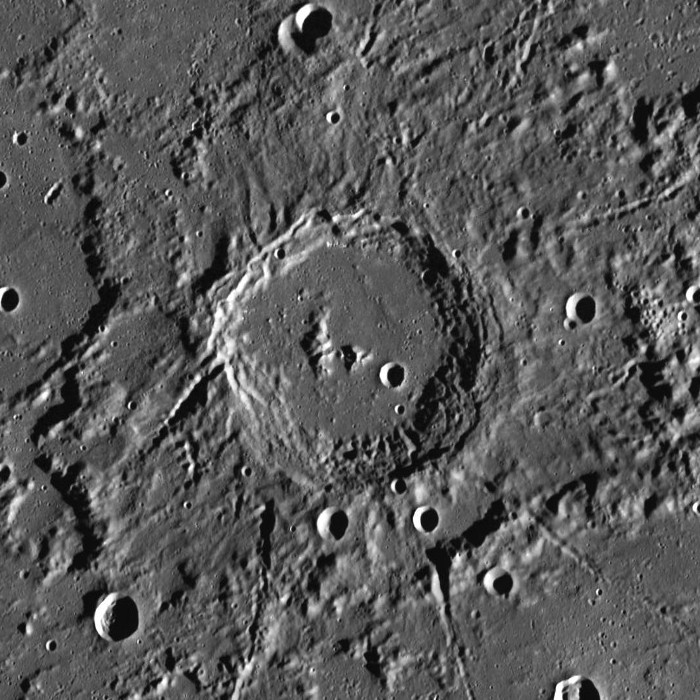
- MESSENGER WAC mosaic of Mansur
- Feature type: Central-peak impact crater
- Location: Shakespeare quadrangle, Mercury
- Coordinates: 47.41°N 163.61°W
- Diameter: 95 km (59 mi)
- Eponym: Ustad Mansur

Mansur is a crater on Mercury. Its name was adopted by the International Astronomical Union in 1979. Mansur is named for the Indian artist Ustad Mansur, who lived in the 17th century CE. The crater was first imaged by Mariner 10 in 1974.

The Mansurian time period on Mercury is named after Mansur crater. The time of its impact does not denote the start of the period, but the crater is an excellent example of a Mansurian crater.

The large crater Van Eyck is to the southeast of Mansur, and the larger Shakespeare is to the northeast.

== Views ==
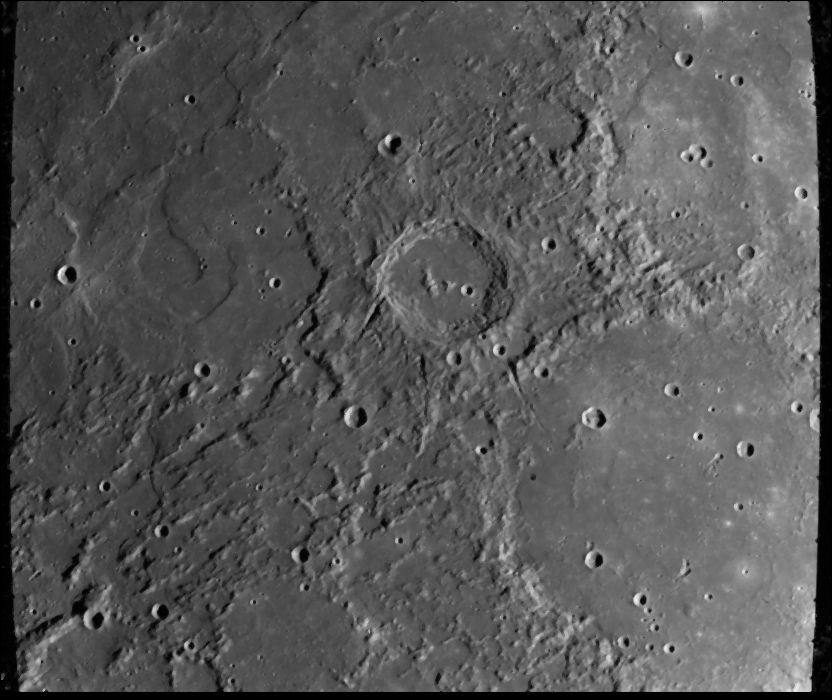
Mariner 10 image with Mansur crater near center

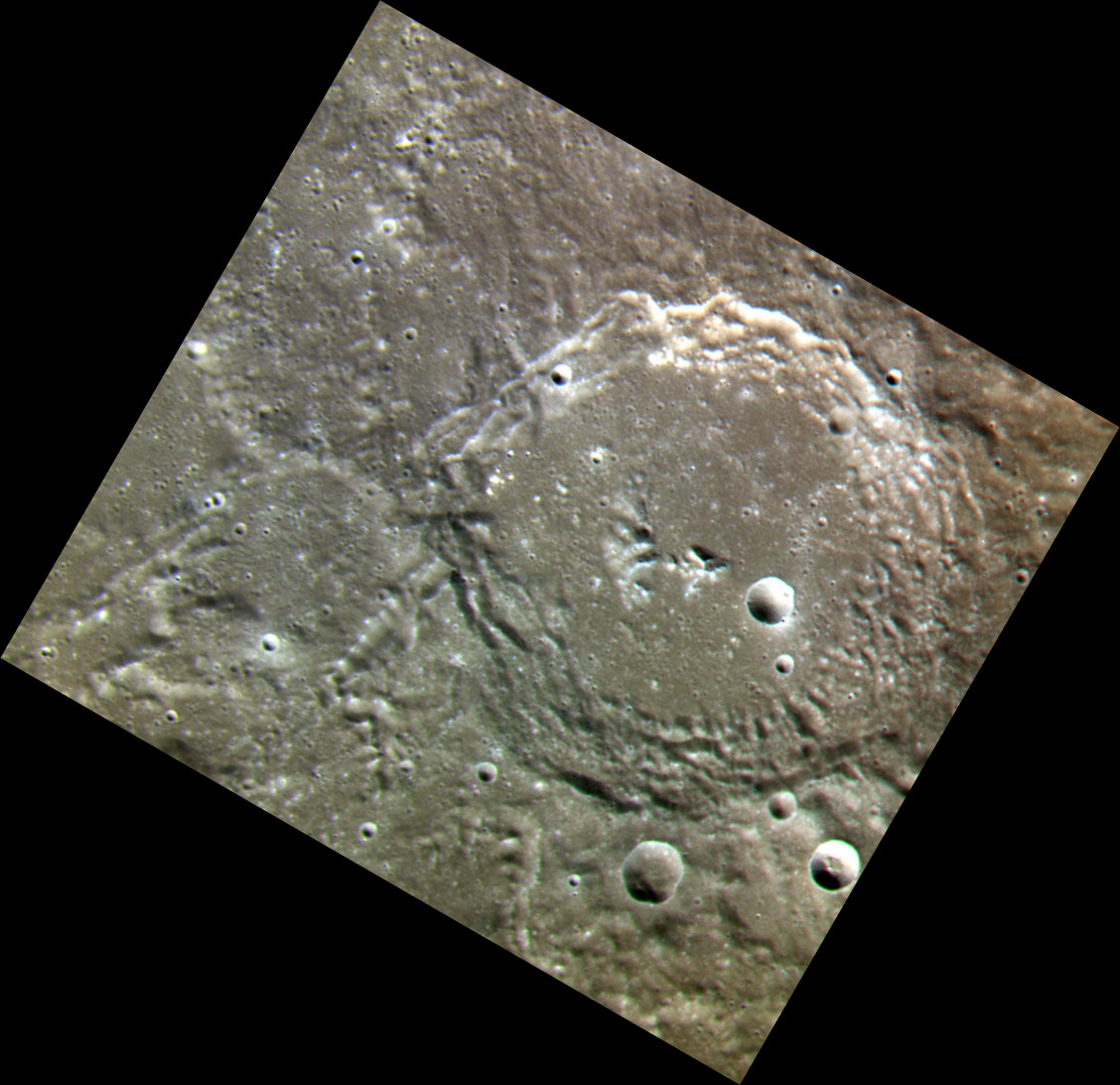
Approximate color image from MESSENGER

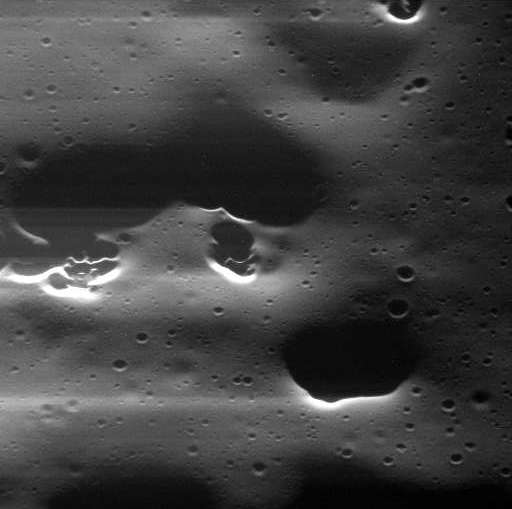
Detail of the hollows near the northern crater rim

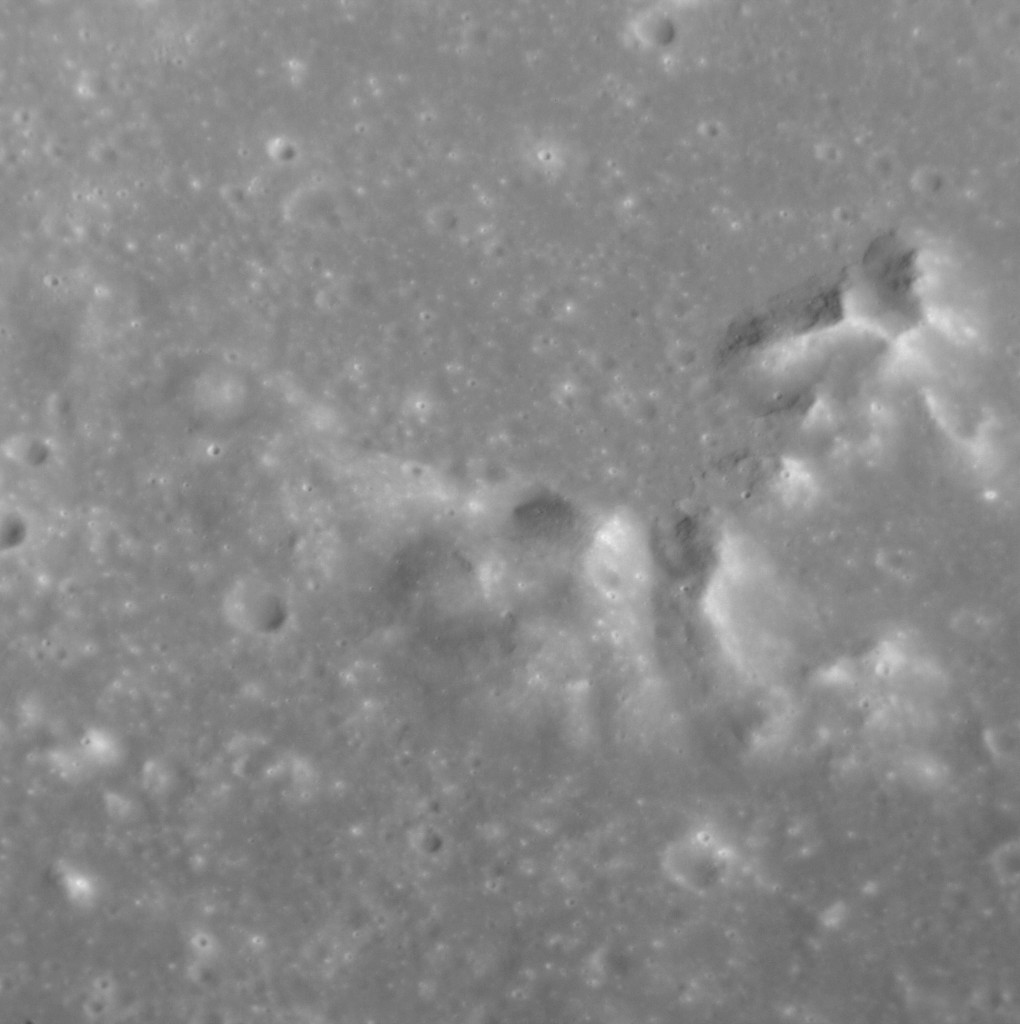
The central peak complex
