= Fet (crater) =

Crater on Mercury

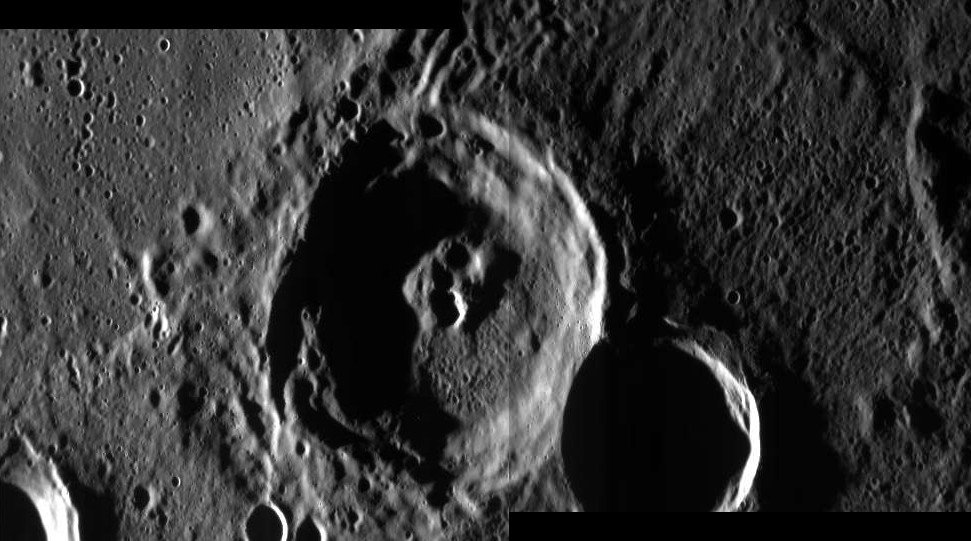
- MESSENGER NAC mosaic
- Feature type: Impact crater
- Location: Tolstoj quadrangle, Mercury
- Coordinates: 4.72°S 180.22°W
- Diameter: 79 km (49 mi)
- Eponym: Afanasy Fet

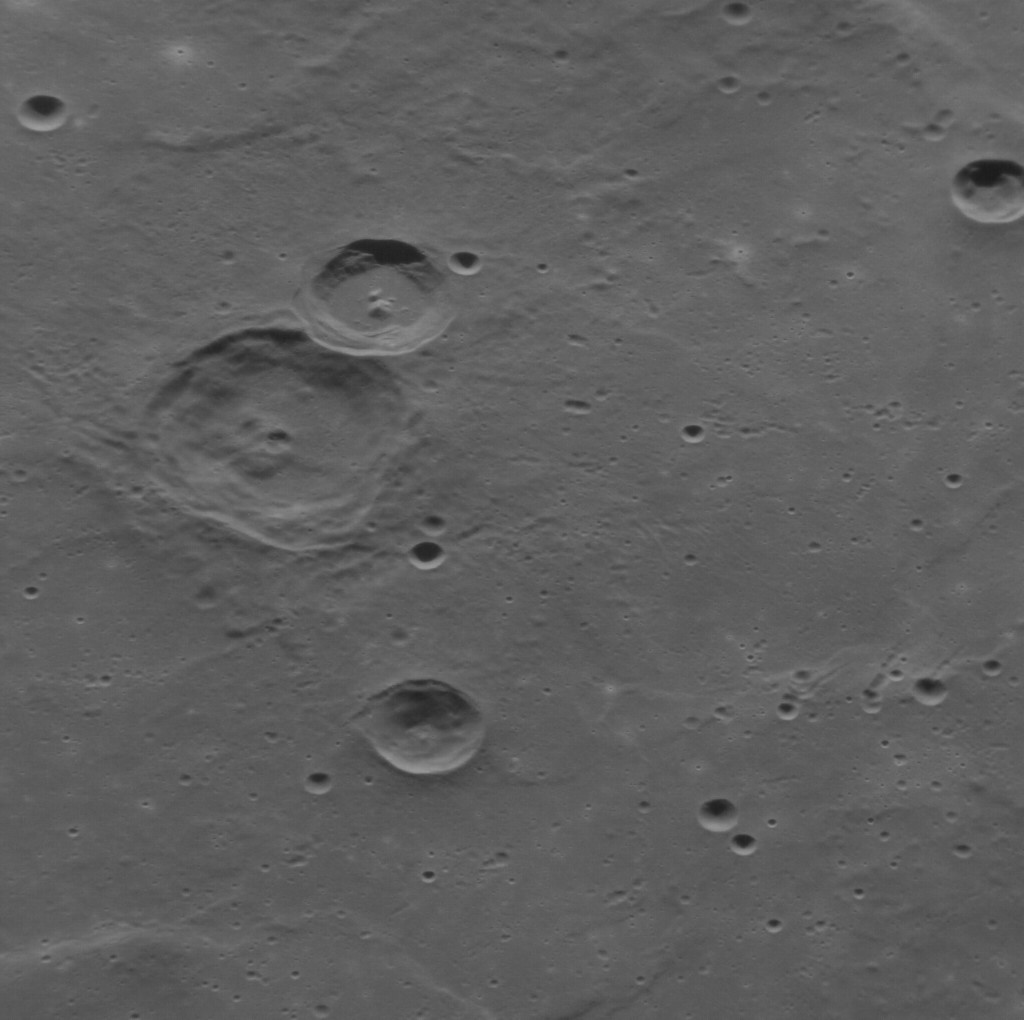
Oblique view of Fet (upper left) in Tir Planitia

Fet is a crater on Mercury that is named for the Russian poet Afanasy Fet, who lived from 1820 to 1892. Its name was adopted by the International Astronomical Union in 1985. The diameter of the crater is 79 kilometers.

Fet lies within Tir Planitia.
