= Van Eyck (crater) =

Crater on Mercury

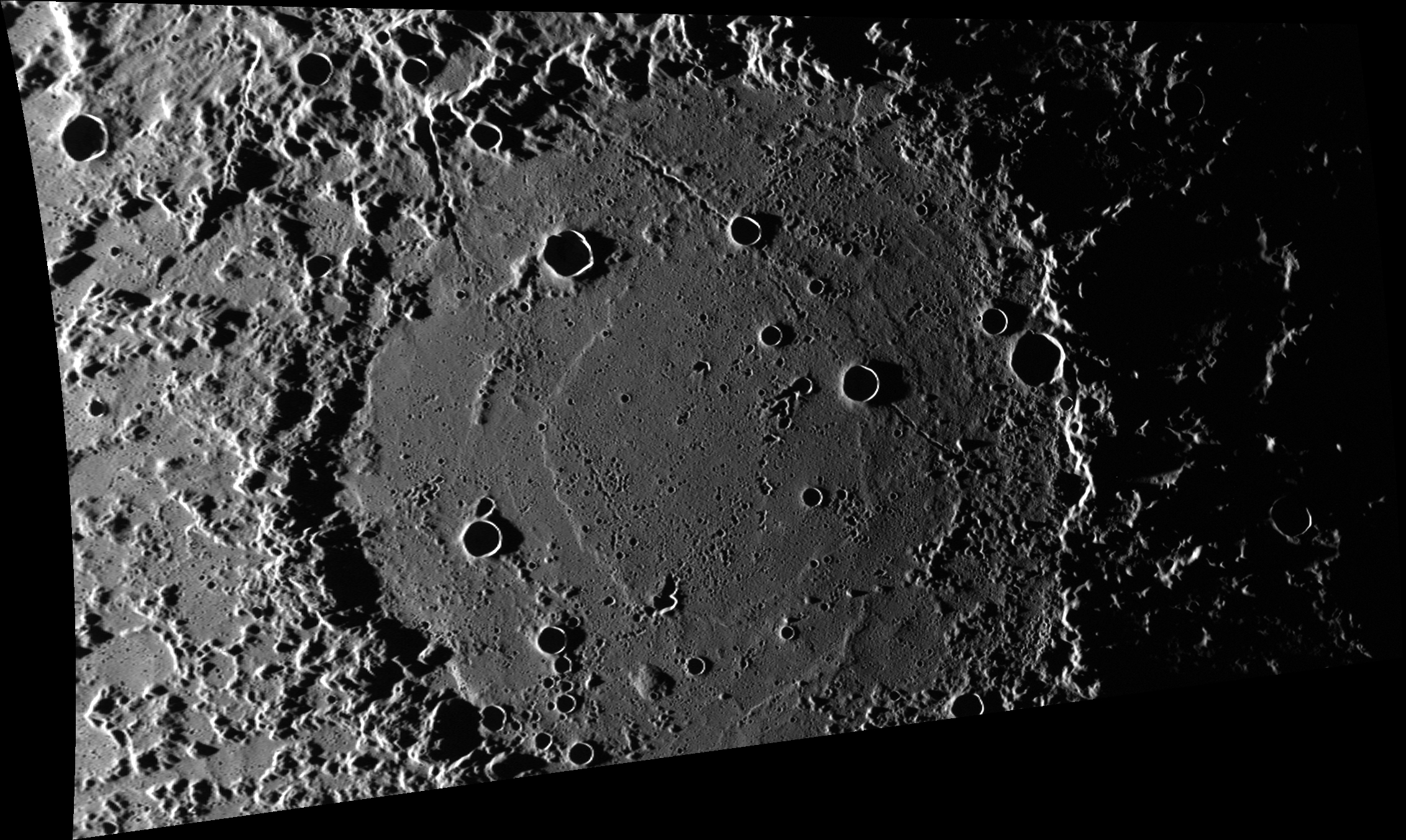
- MESSENGER image
- Planet: Mercury
- Coordinates: 43.22°N 159.43°W
- Quadrangle: Shakespeare
- Diameter: 271 km (168 mi)
- Eponym: Jan van Eyck

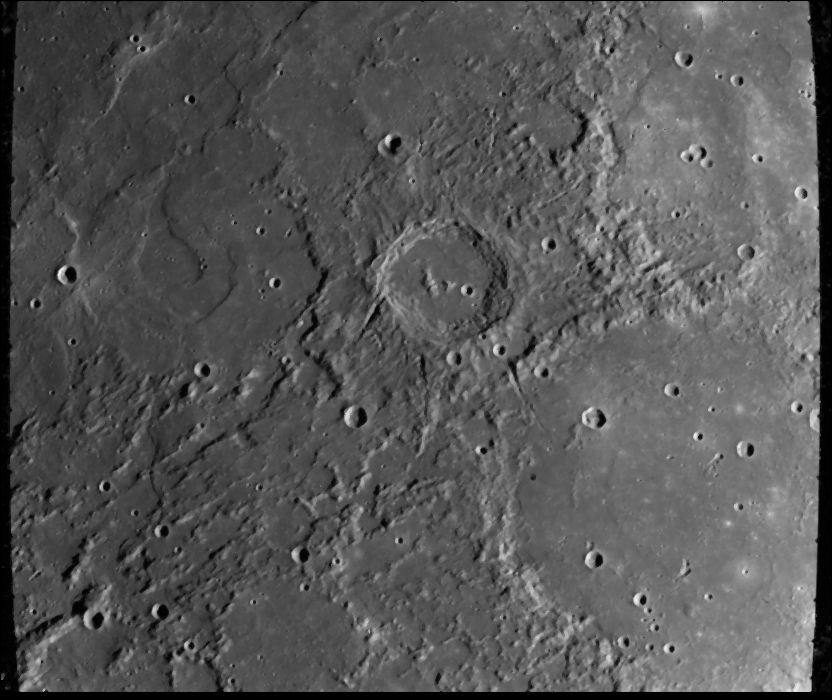
Mariner 10 image showing most of Van Eyck in lower right.

Van Eyck is a 271 km diameter impact basin in the Shakespeare quadrangle of Mercury. It is named after the 15th century Flemish painter Jan van Eyck. Its name was adopted by the International Astronomical Union (IAU) in 1979. The crater was first imaged by Mariner 10 in 1974.

Van Eyck lies on the southwestern margin of the even-larger Shakespeare basin. The younger Mansur crater lies to the northwest of Van Eyck.

The Van Eyck Formation of the Caloris Group is named after this crater.
