= Caloris Group =

Set of geologic units on Mercury

The Caloris group is a set of geologic units on Mercury. McCauley and others have proposed the name “Caloris Group” to include the mappable units created by the impact that formed the Caloris Basin and have formally named four formations within the group, which were first recognized and named informally by Trask and Guest based on imagery from the Mariner 10 spacecraft that flew by Mercury in 1974 and 1975. The extent of the formations within the group have been expanded and refined based on imagery and other data from the MESSENGER spacecraft which orbited Mercury from 2011 to 2015, and imaged parts of the planet that were in shadow at the time of the Mariner 10 encounters.

Like the Imbrium and Orientale Basins on the Moon, Caloris Basin is surrounded by an extensive and well-preserved ejecta blanket As on the Moon, where ejecta from the better preserved basins was used to construct a stratigraphy, the ejecta from the Caloris Basin also can be used as a marker horizon. This ejecta is recognizable to a distance of about one basin diameter in all directions. A stratigraphic and structural comparison between the Orientale and Caloris Basins has been made by McCauley. McCauley and others proposed a formal rock stratigraphy for the Caloris Basin. This stratigraphy is patterned after that used in and around the Orientale Basin on the Moon. Crater degradation chronologies, such as the one modified from Trask, and correlations between plains units on the basis of crater frequency may aid in tying much of the remainder of the surface of Mercury to the Caloris event.

Unlike the Imbrium-related stratigraphy of Shoemaker and Hackman, the stratigraphy devised for Mercury is a rock rather than a time stratigraphy. It recognizes the existence of an orderly, in essence isochronous sequence of mappable units around Caloris that are similar in character to those recognized around the better preserved impact basins of the Moon such as Orientale, Imbrium, and Nectaris.

The four formations are described in order of occurrence from the rim of Caloris Basin outward:

== Caloris Montes Formation ==
The Caloris Montes Formation, which was informally called the Caloris mountains terrain by Trask and Guest, consists of a jumbled array of smooth-appearing but highly segmented mountain massifs that rise 1-2 km above the surrounding terrain. These massifs mark the crestline of the most prominent scarp or ring of the Caloris Basin and grade outward into smaller blocks and lineated terrain. The Caloris Montes Formation is very similar in morphology to and is considered the equivalent of the massif facies of the Montes Rook Formation around the Orientale Basin. The Caloris Montes is interpreted as basin rim deposits consisting of ejecta from deep within Caloris that is mixed with but generally overlies uplifted and highly fractured prebasin bedrock.

A gap is present in the Caloris Montes toward the southeast; its origin is unknown, but it is somewhat similar to the gap on the east side of the Imbrium Basin, where the mountain ring cuts the edge of the Serenitatis Basin. On Mercury, however, we have no evidence for the presence of a preexisting basin east of Caloris.

== Nervo Formation ==
The Nervo Formation consists of rolling to locally hummocky plains that lie in intermassif depressions between the mountains formed by the Caloris Montes Formation. The plains generally lie within the annulus of rugged terrain marked by the Caloris Montes Formation and locally appear to drape and overlie some of the more low-lying massifs. The Nervo bears some resemblance to the Apennine Bench Formation around the Imbrium Basin; its closest counterpart in Orientale is the knobby facies of the Montes Rook Formation. The Nervo Formation was originally designated the intermontane plains by Trask and Guest and has been interpreted by them as fallback ejecta, an interpretation that seems to explain its distribution pattern and relative roughness as well as the fact that it is generally perched above the smooth plains that encompass Caloris.

The Nervo formation is named after Nervo crater.

== Odin Formation ==
The Odin Formation, which was originally called the hummocky plains by Trask and Guest, was described by them as consisting of low, closely spaced to scattered smooth hills about 0.3 to 1 km across and from tens of meters to a few hundred meters high. In some places the hills are aligned concentrically with the rim to the Caloris Basin, and the plains appear corrugated. The area between the hills is similar in appearance to the smooth plains; in some areas the Odin Formation may be partly flooded by smooth plains materials, but for mapping convenience this area has been included in the Odin Formation. The extent of the Odin Formation was expanded by Fassett et al. and Denevi et al.

The distribution pattern of the Odin appears similar to that of the thinner, more distal parts of Alpes Formation of the Imbrium Basin on the Moon. The Odin, like the Alpes, occurs in broad lobes such as those in Odin Planitia beyond the main basin scarp. The Odin also mantles the intercrater plains ancient crater materials out to a distance of 1200 km from the main Caloris scarp. The Odin Formation is interpreted as part of the Caloris ejecta sequence, but its mode of origin is less clear than those of certain other Caloris formations. The unit may consist of late-arriving, blocky, coherent ejecta from deep within the Caloris cavity, later partly buried by smooth plains.

Odin locally mantles intercrater plains, lineated plains, and intermediate plains materials to a distance of 1,100 km from the Caloris Basin scarp. It is named after Odin Planitia, its "type area". It is also mapped in Mearcair Planitia, Stilbon Planitia, and Tir Planitia.

== Van Eyck Formation ==
The Van Eyck Formation, which is the most distinctive of the circum-Caloris stratigraphic units, was called the Caloris lineated terrain by Trask and Guest. It is named after the Van Eyck crater.

The Van Eyck Formation has a lineated facies and a secondary-crater facies. The lineated facies extends from the Caloris Montes as much as about 1,000 km. It consists of long, hilly ridges and grooves that are subradial to the Caloris Basin and are extensively embayed by smooth plains. The inner boundary of the Van Eyck is generally coincident with the weak outer Caloris scarp. The Van Eyck is similar in morphology but somewhat more degraded than the Fra Mauro Formation around the Imbrium Basin on the Moon; secondary cratering and ballistic deposition of ejecta from Caloris undoubtedly played an important role in its emplacement. It is difficult to define individual secondary craters within the Van Eyck, but at a distance of about one basin diameter, numerous clusters and chains of moderately well preserved craters occur that are interpreted as far-flung Caloris secondary craters. These craters have been included in a separate facies of the Van Eyck Formation because of their regional stratigraphic significance. It is noteworthy that this lineated terrain occurs near the foot of the Caloris Montes, whereas similar units of the Imbrium Basin on the Moon occur farther from the basin rim. Such a difference in extent is to be expected because mercurian gravity is two and a half times greater than lunar gravity, and ejecta would fall closer to its source than ejecta from a similar-size basin on the Moon.

Over much of its outcrop, it appears to be veneered by a thin plains unit that has filled hollows in the surface. The plains unit in these areas has generally been infilled with the Van Eyck Formation, although it may, in part, be smooth plains material.
