= Odin Planitia =

Geologic basin on Mercury

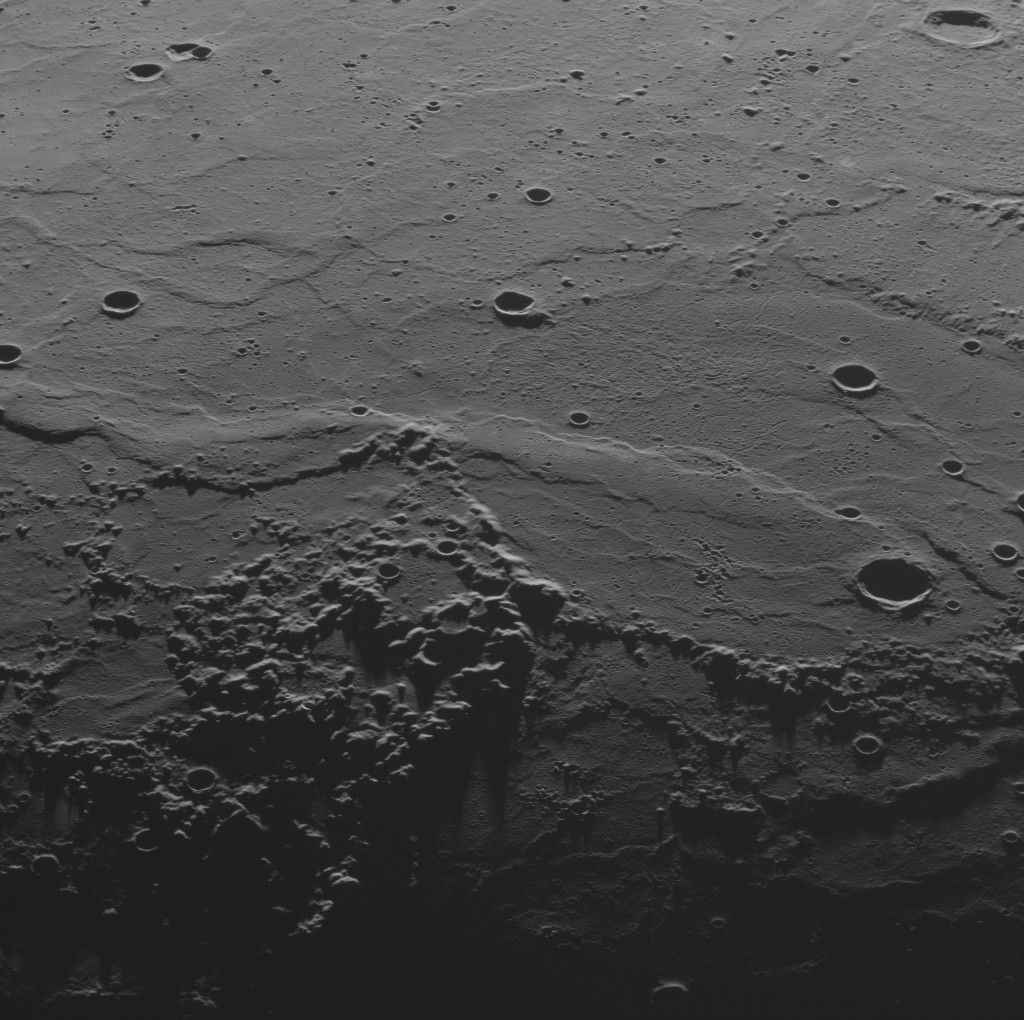
- Oblique view looking west across northern Odin Planitia. MESSENGER WAC.
- Location: Tolstoj quadrangle and Shakespeare quadrangle, Mercury
- Coordinates: 23.3°N 171.6°W
- Eponym: Odin

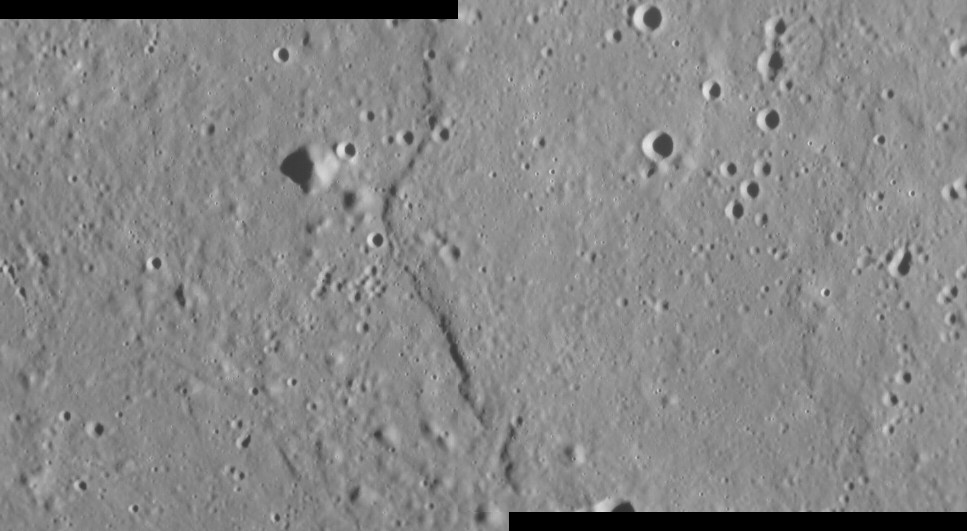
Central Odin Planitia

Odin Planitia is a large basin on Mercury. It was named after the Norse god Odin, who was sometimes considered to be the equivalent of the Roman god Mercury, in 1976 by the IAU. It was first observed in detail by Mariner 10. The plain is approximately 473 kilometers in diameter.

A large volcanic dome 7 km in diameter and 1.4 km high is situated near the center of Odin.

Odin Planitia is located east of the Caloris basin. The southern portion is mapped on the Tolstoj quadrangle, and the northern portion is on the Shakespeare quadrangle.

Odin Planitia is one of four named plains that surround the Caloris basin (with Mearcair Planitia, Stilbon Planitia, and Tir Planitia). All of these plains are classified as smooth, as opposed to intracrater plains which have rougher topography. They also contain areas where kilometer-scale knobs protrude above the plains, and these areas are called the Odin Formation. The Odin Formation is interpreted as a mixture of impact melt and blocky basin ejecta, formed by the Caloris impact event.
