= Nureyev (surname) =

Nureyev, Nureev, Nuriyev, or Nuriev (Russian: Нуреев, Tatar: Нуриев, Bashkir: Нуриев) is a Russianized Muslim masculine family name meaning "light". Its feminine counterpart is Nureyeva, Nureeva, Nuriyeva, or Nurieva. It may refer to:

- Aydar Nuriev (born 1994), Russian racing driver
- Elkhan Nuriyev (born 1969), Azerbaijani political scientist
- Ilgiz Nuriyev (born 1984), Russian ice hockey player
- Marat Nuriyev (born 1966), Russian politician
- Rudolf Nureyev (1938–1993), Soviet dancer of Tatar origin
  - Fonteyn & Nureyev on Broadway
- Rustem Nureev (1950–2023), Russian scientist and economist
- Nureyev (horse) (1977–2001), a Kentucky-bred Thoroughbred racehorse and champion sire
- Nureyev (crater), a crater on Mercury
