= Navoi (crater) =

Crater on Mercury

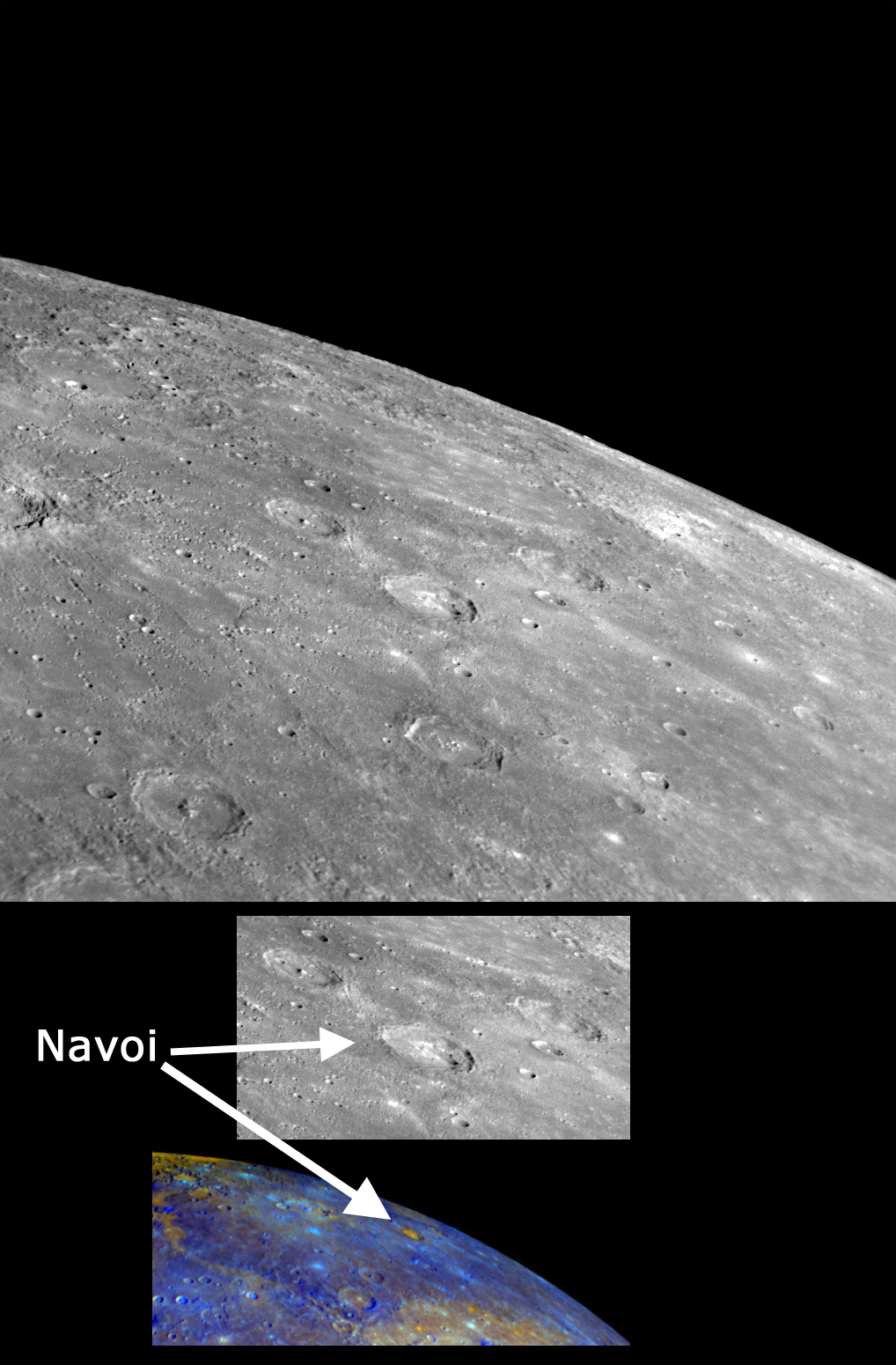
- Navoi crater, with an enhanced colour version highlighting its reddish colouration.
- Feature type: Impact crater
- Location: Raditladi quadrangle, Mercury
- Coordinates: 58.82°N 199.59°W
- Diameter: 69 km (43 mi)
- Eponym: Ali-Shir Nava'i

Navoi is a crater on Mercury. It contains uncommon reddish material that indicates a different rock composition from its surroundings. Navoi also appears to have an irregularly shaped depression in its center. Such depressions have been seen elsewhere on Mercury, including within Praxiteles crater, and may indicate past volcanic activity.

Navoi was named after Uzbek poet Ali-Shir Nava'i in 2008.

The large crater Oskison is west of Navoi.

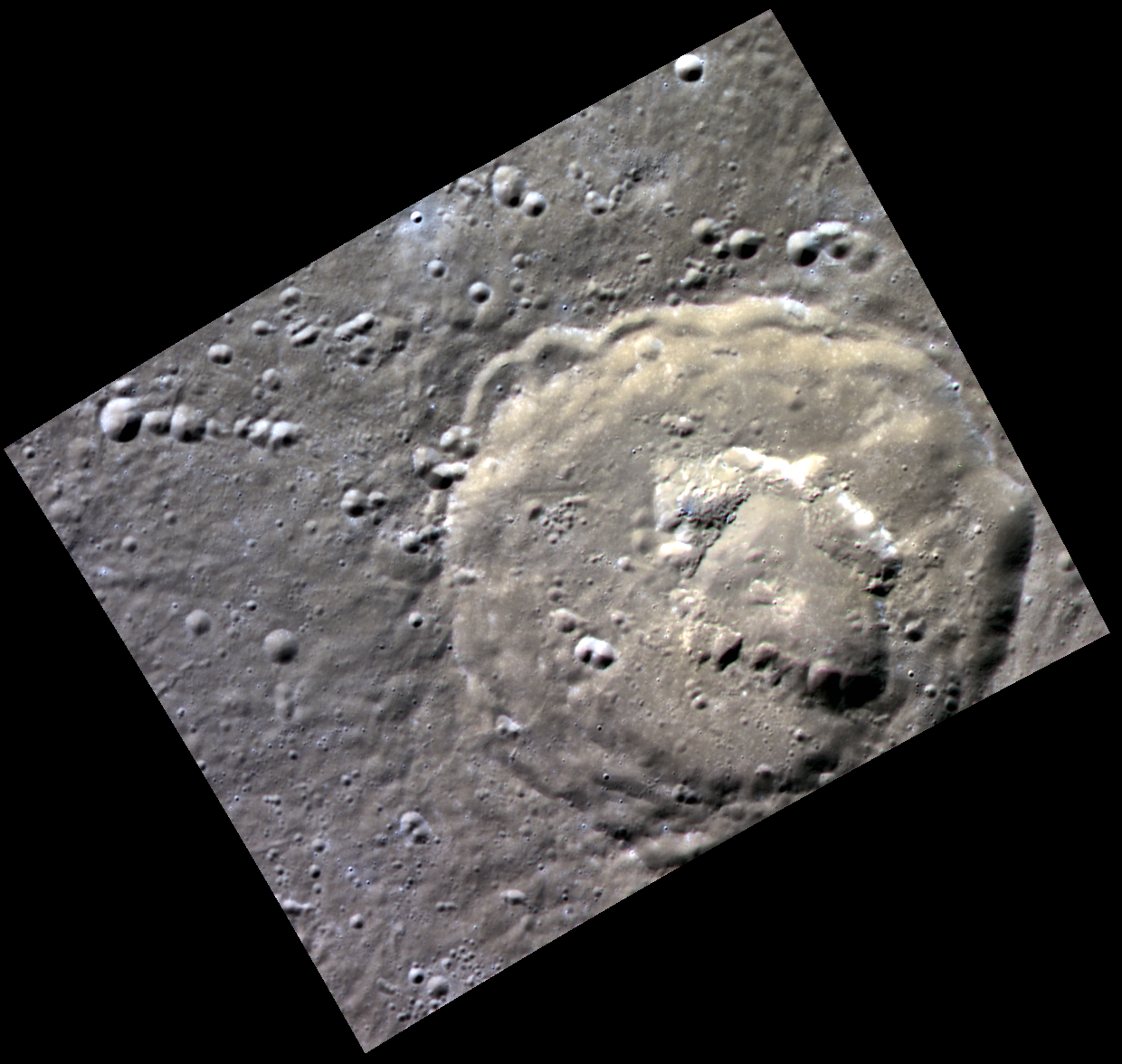
Exaggerated color image by MESSENGER

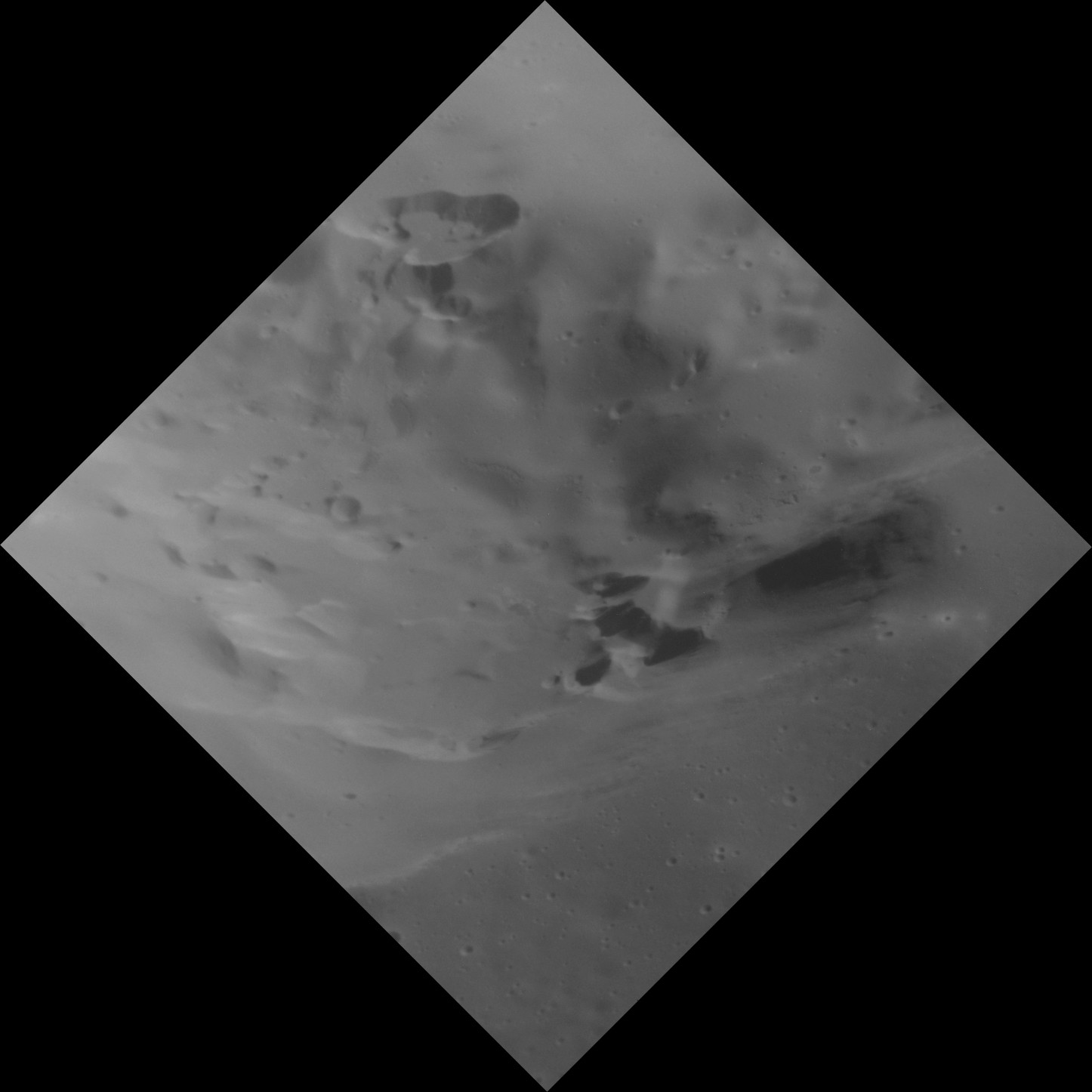
Detail of the northwestern end of the pit within the crater. Image is about 8.8 km wide.

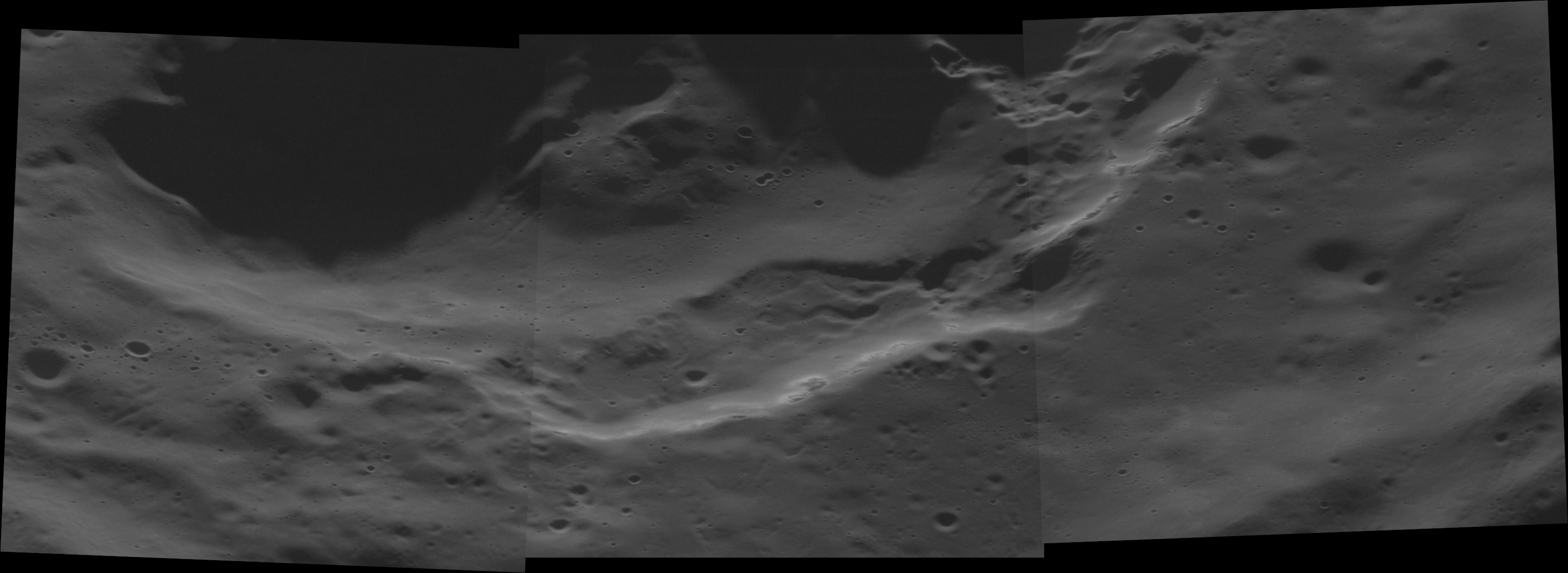
A view of the northeastern part of the pit.
