= Stilbon Planitia =

Planitia on Mercury

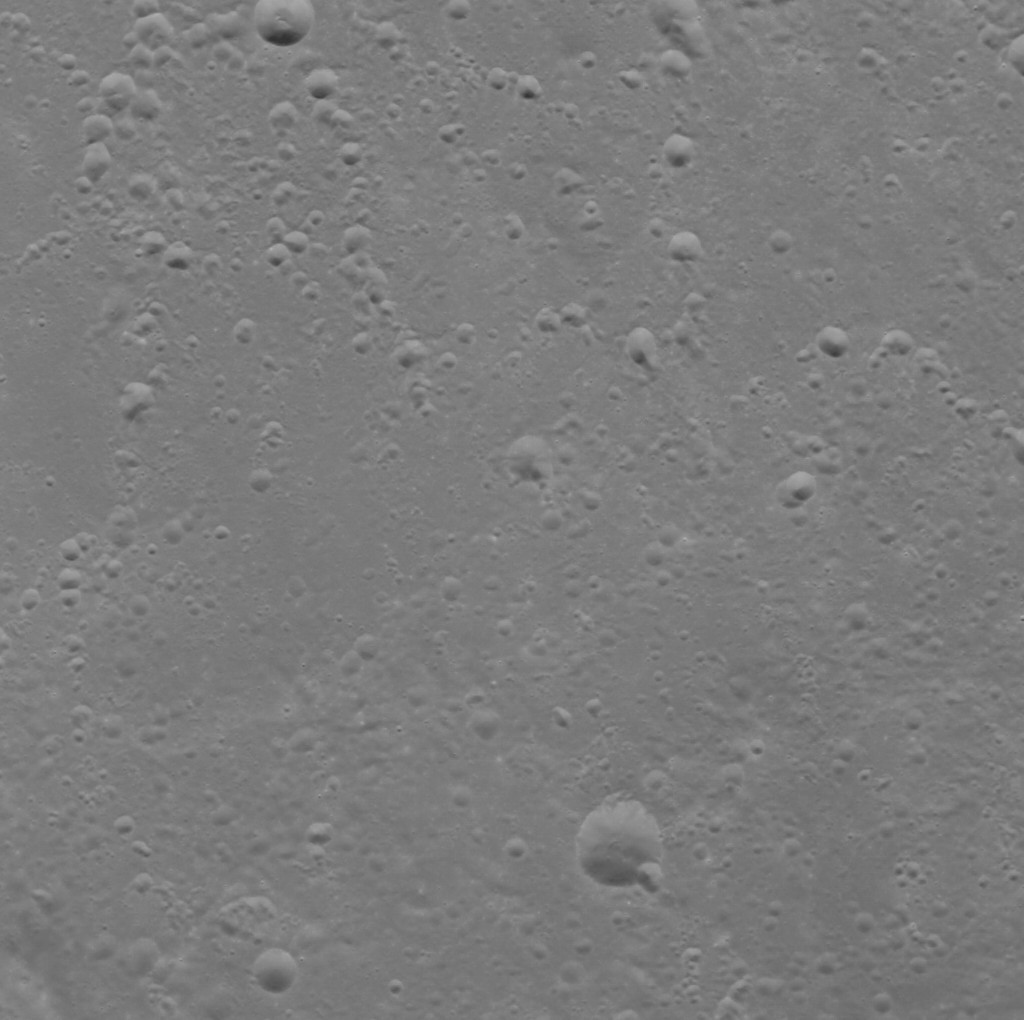
- Typical view of Stilbon Planitia, south of Oskison crater.
- Location: Raditladi quadrangle, Mercury
- Coordinates: 57.54°N 209.61°W
- Eponym: Greek word for Mercury

Stilbon Planitia is a large plain on the planet Mercury. The name Stilbon is ancient Greek word for "Mercury", and the name was approved in 2017. It was first observed in detail by MESSENGER. It lies north of the Caloris basin, and is approximately 1550 kilometers long.

Stilbon Planitia is one of four named plains that surround the Caloris basin (with Mearcair Planitia, Tir Planitia, and Odin Planitia). All of these plains are classified as smooth, as opposed to intracrater plains which have rougher topography. They also contain areas where kilometer-scale knobs protrude above the plains, and these areas are called the Odin Formation. The Odin Formation is interpreted as a mixture of impact melt and blocky basin ejecta, formed by the Caloris impact event.

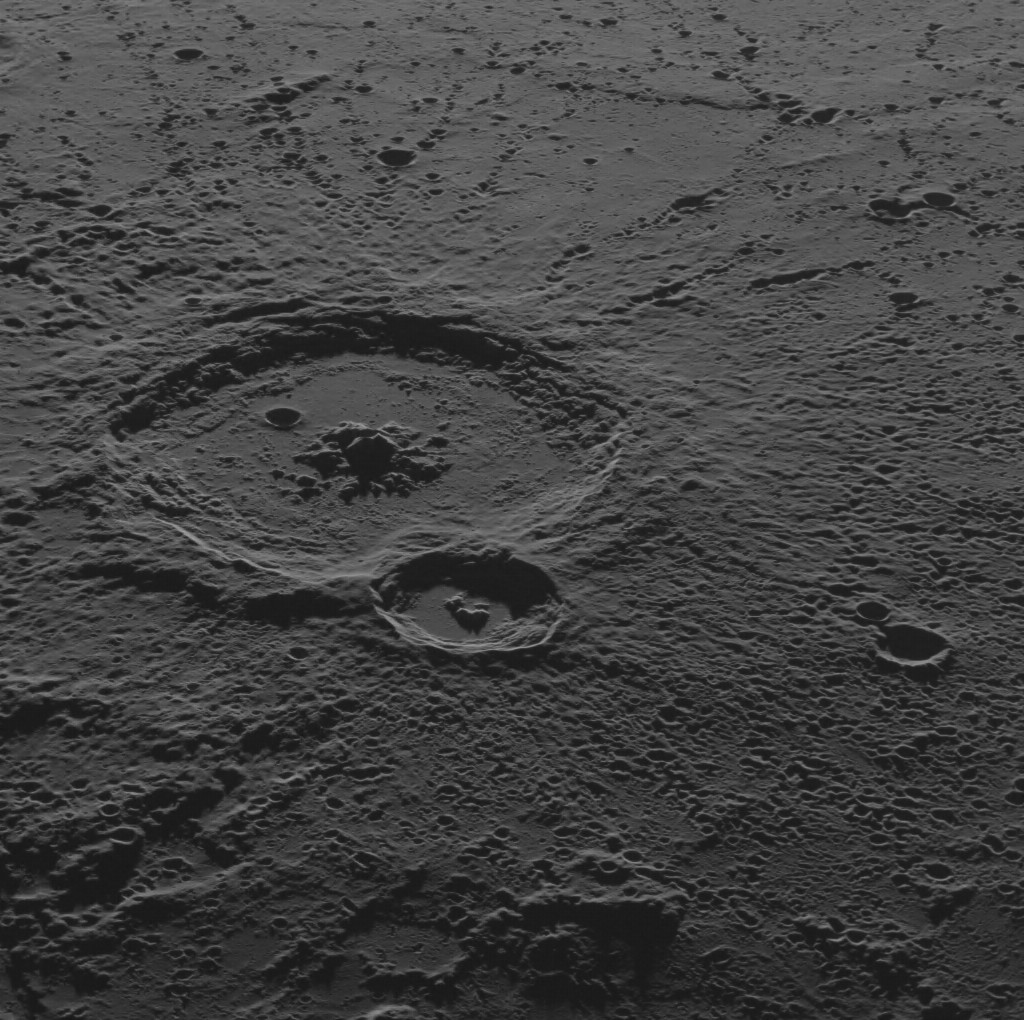
Oskison crater is near center, and Stilbon Planitia is above and to the right of it.
