= Nureyev (crater) =

Crater on Mercury

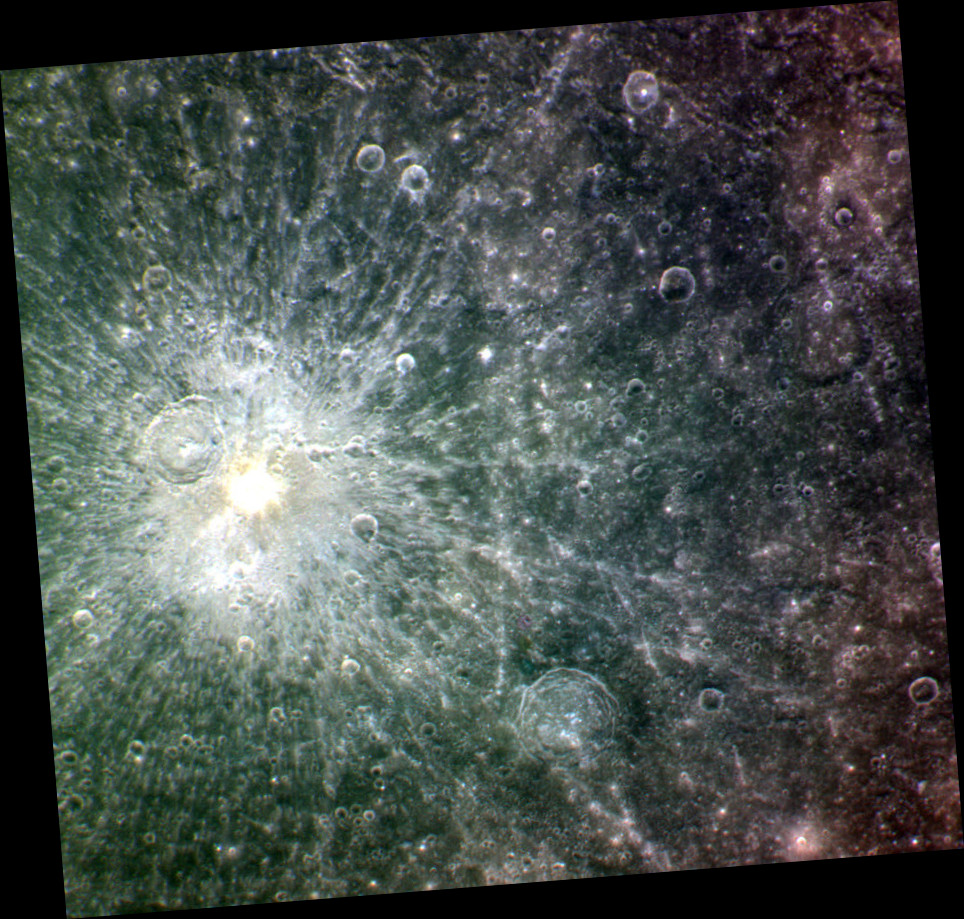
- Approximate color image by MESSENGER showing Nureyev's ray system
- Feature type: Impact crater
- Location: Tolstoj quadrangle, Mercury
- Coordinates: 11.68°N 173.13°W
- Diameter: 16 km (9.9 mi)
- Eponym: Rudolf Nureyev

Nureyev is a crater on Mercury. It has a diameter of 16 kilometers, and has a bright and extensive ray system. The crater was first imaged by Mariner 10 in 1974.

Its name was adopted by the International Astronomical Union (IAU) on April 24, 2012. Nureyev is named for the Soviet and British ballet dancer Rudolf Nureyev.

Nureyev is east of Amru Al-Qays crater, and both are located southeast of the Caloris basin.

== Views ==
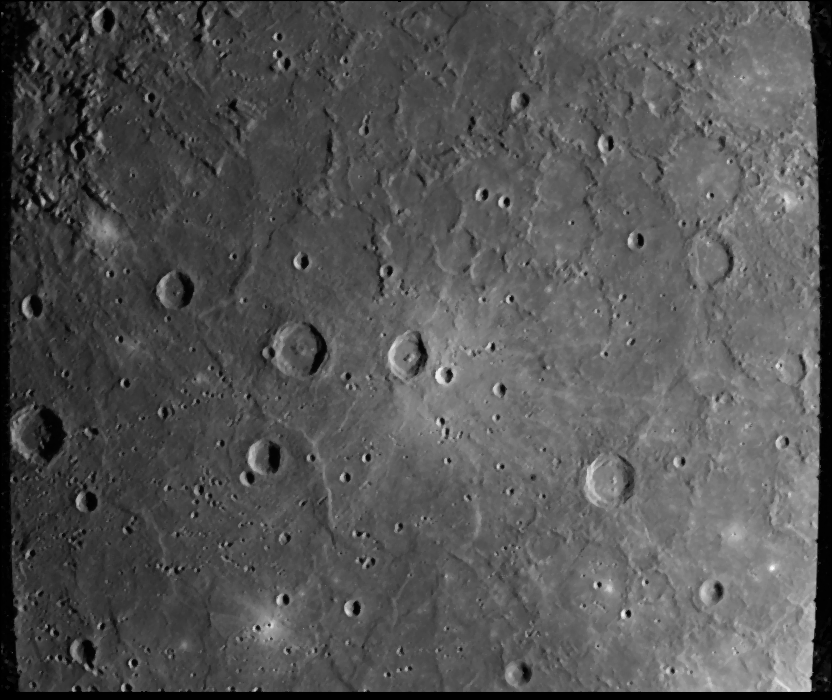
Mariner 10 image with Nureyev at center

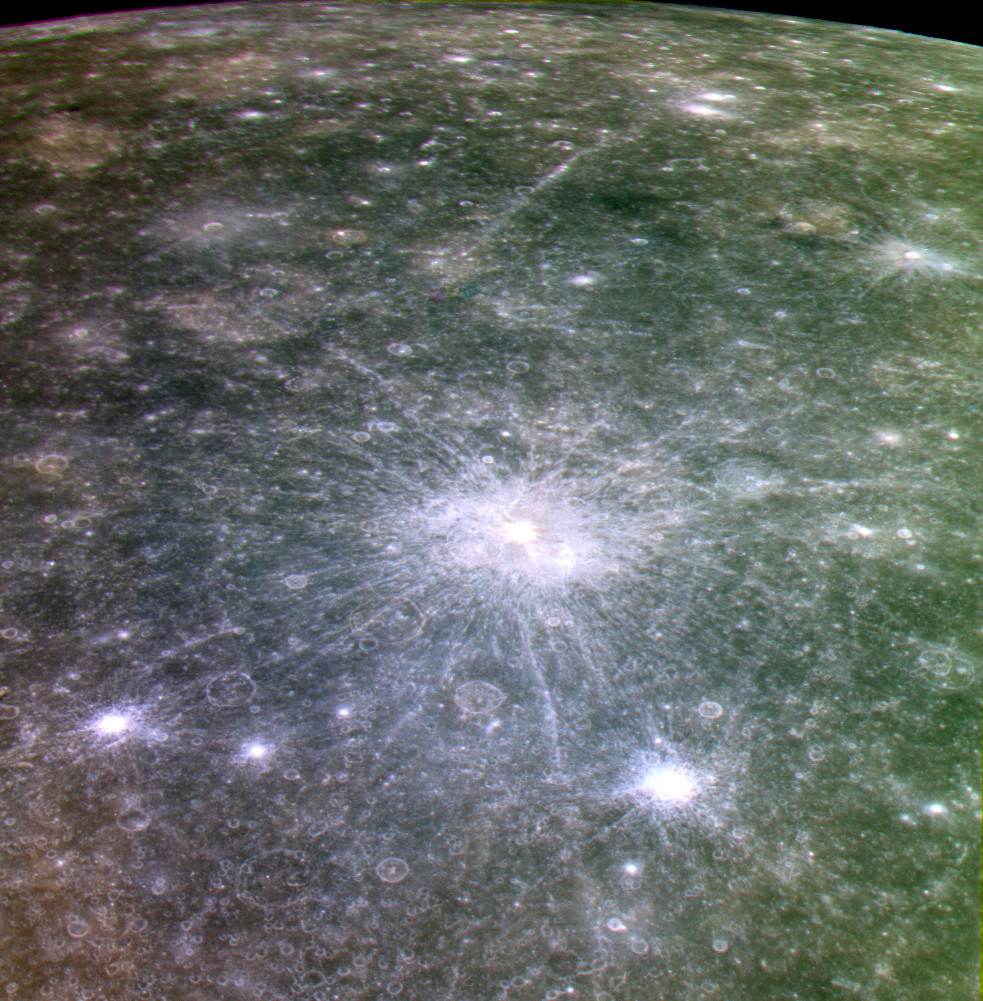
Oblique view by MESSENGER in exaggerated color, with Budh Planitia in the background.

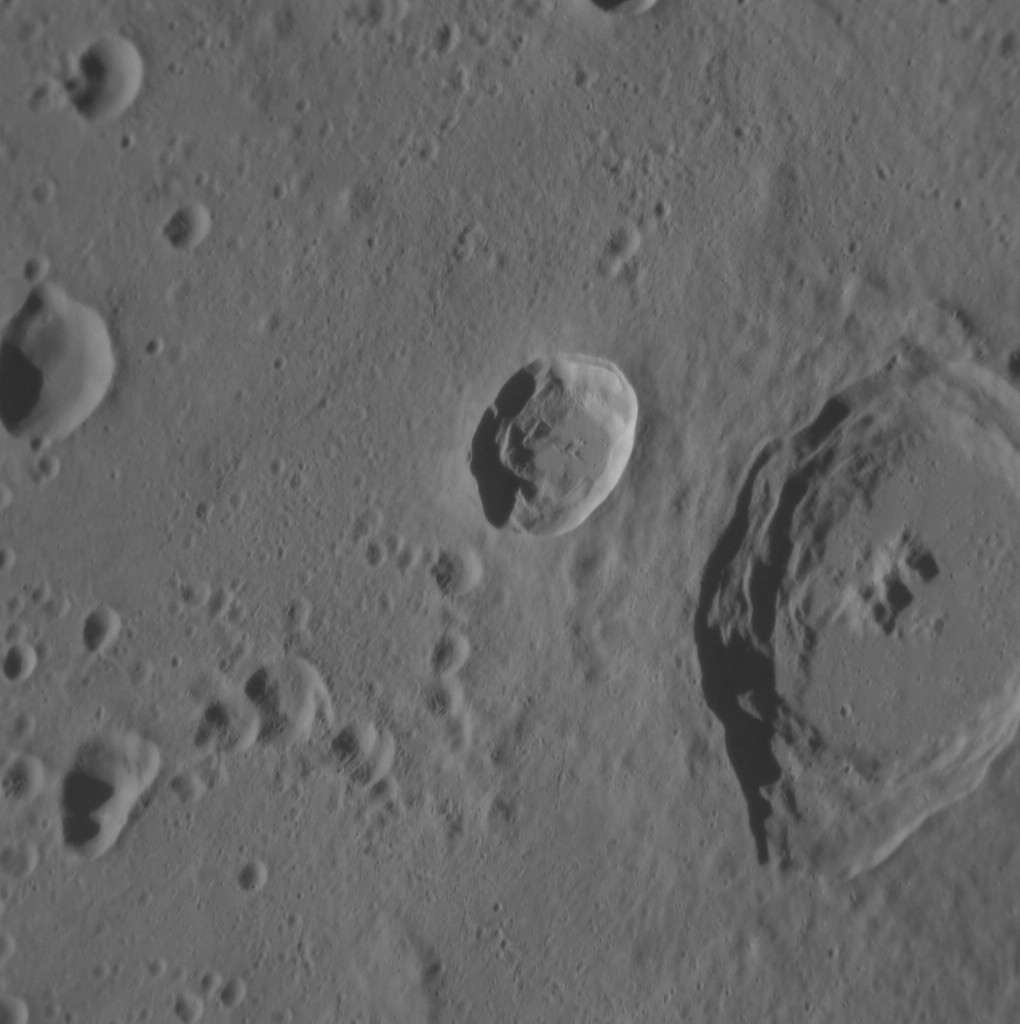
Nureyev crater (center) at a low sun angle
