= Natural History Museum, Port Louis =

Museum in Port Louis, Mauritius

Natural History Museum
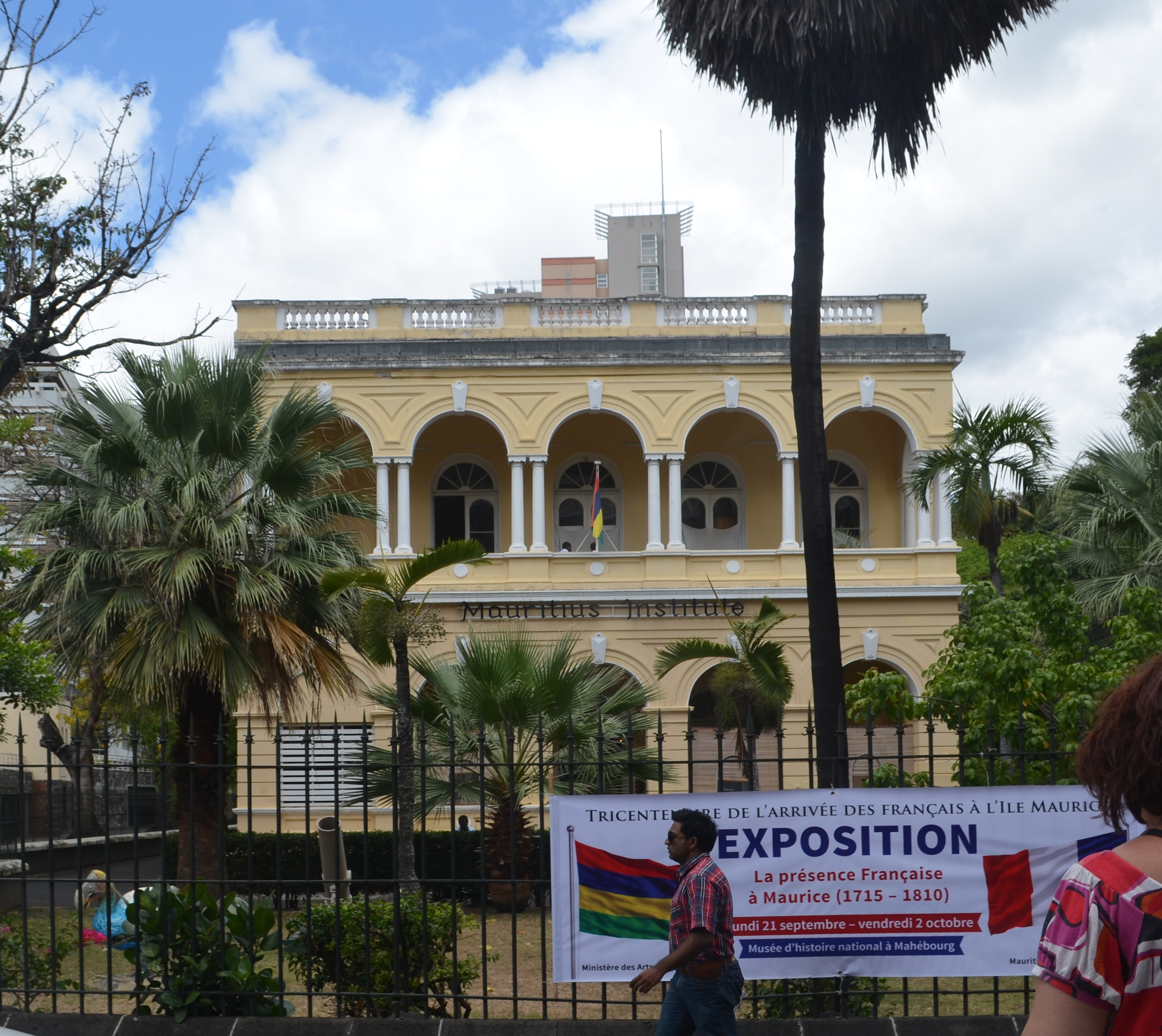
- Location: Port Louis, Mauritius
- Coordinates: 20°09′47.4″S 57°30′08.5″E
- Type: museum

The Natural History Museum is a museum in Port Louis, Mauritius.

== History ==
The museum is the oldest in Mauritius. The museum building was constructed in 1880. On 22 December 2021, Prime Minister Pravind Jugnauth inaugurated the Mauritian Ex-Servicemen's World War I and World War II Tribute Gallery inside the museum.

== Architecture ==
The museum is located at the ground floor of Mauritius Institute building. It consists of Fauna Gallery, Marine Life Gallery, Insects, Meteorology, Giant Tortoise Gallery and The World of the Dodo.

== Exhibitions ==
The museum exhibits various replica of fauna and flora.

== See also ==
- List of museums in Mauritius
