= National History Museum of Mauritius =

National museum in Mauritius

- Musée National d'Histoire
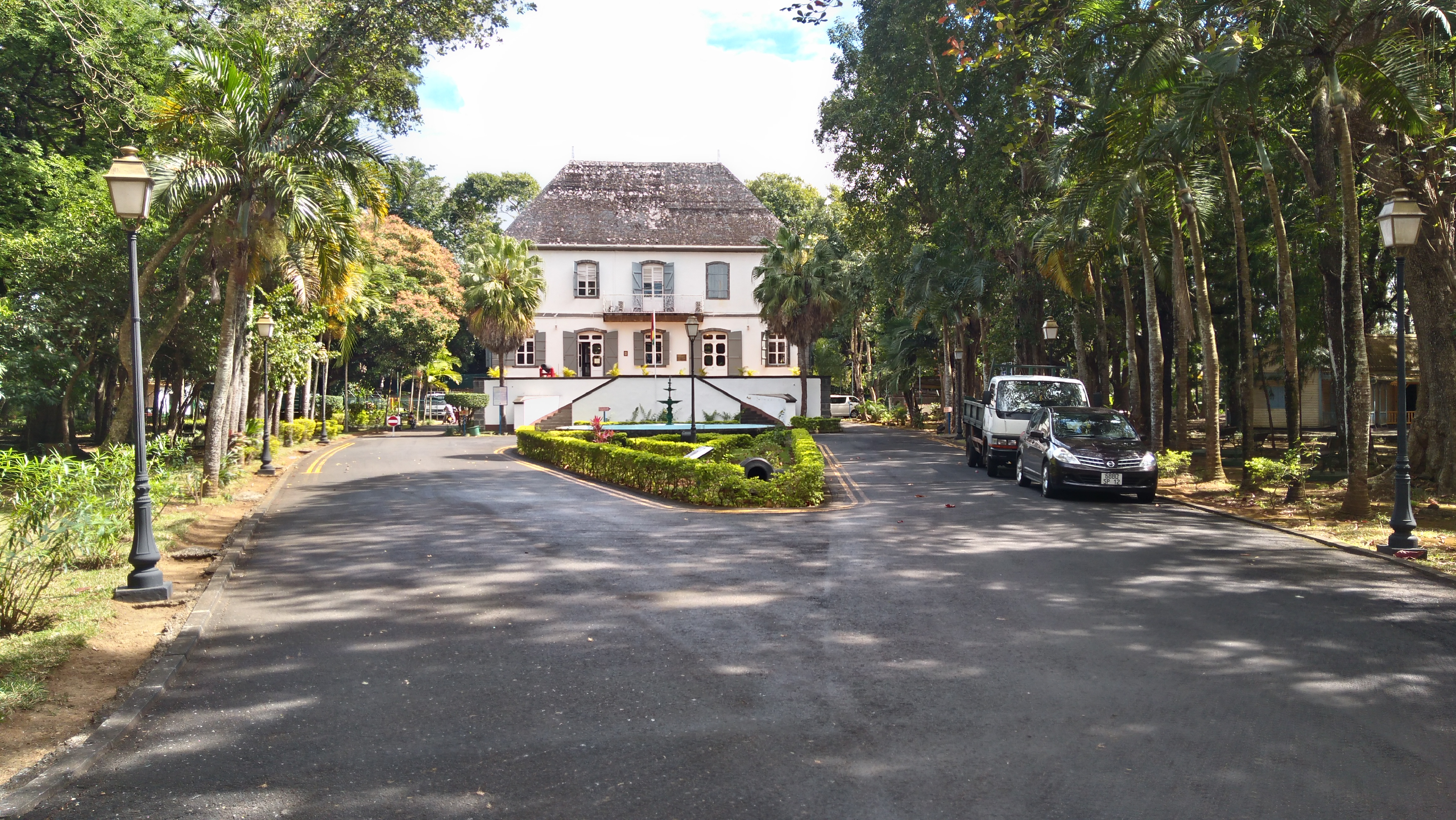
- National History Museum building, 23 August 2018
- Established: 15 September 1950
- Location: Mahebourg, Mauritius
- Coordinates: 20.4163°S 57.7030°E
- Type: History
- Director: Deoraz Ramracheya
- Curator: Mauritius Museums Council

The National History Museum of Mauritius (French: Musée National d'Histoire), also known as the Mahebourg Museum or formerly the Naval and Historical Museum (French: Musée naval de l'île Maurice), is a national museum located in Mahebourg, Mauritius. It is housed in an 18th-century French colonial mansion and focuses on the maritime, colonial, and natural history of Mauritius, including artifacts from shipwrecks, maps, and exhibits related to the extinct dodo and other endemic species.

== History ==
The museum is located at Château Gheude (also known as Maison Robillard), a French colonial country house built around 1772 on the banks of the La Chaux River. During the Battle of Grand Port in 1810, it served as a field hospital for the French and British fleets.

The museum's collections originate with the Naval Relics Museum, established by Mauritius Government Railways in 1934, and the Museum of Historical Souvenirs, established in 1938 by Alice Clifford, wife of Governor Bede Clifford. Both museums were closed during World War II, with their collections housed at Government House, Port Louis.

In 1947, the government of Mauritius acquired Château Gheude and made the property available for the Mauritius Institute to establish a history museum. It was opened to the public on 15 September 1950. It was later expanded with materials from historic shipwrecks. In 2000, it was designated a national museum to reflect its broader scope.

== Collections and exhibits ==
The museum's collections include:

- Early maps of Mauritius and the Indian Ocean region.
- Paintings and photographs from the colonial period.
- Model ships and artifacts from naval battles, such as items salvaged from the wrecks of the French frigate La Magicienne and the St. Géran (which inspired the novel Paul et Virginie).
- A near-complete skeleton of the extinct dodo and remains of the Rodrigues solitaire.
- Coins, furniture, cannons, and other items related to the Dutch, French, and British colonial periods, as well as the slave trade and indenture.
- Artefacts from the slave ship Victoire, wrecked in 1804.

== Gallery ==
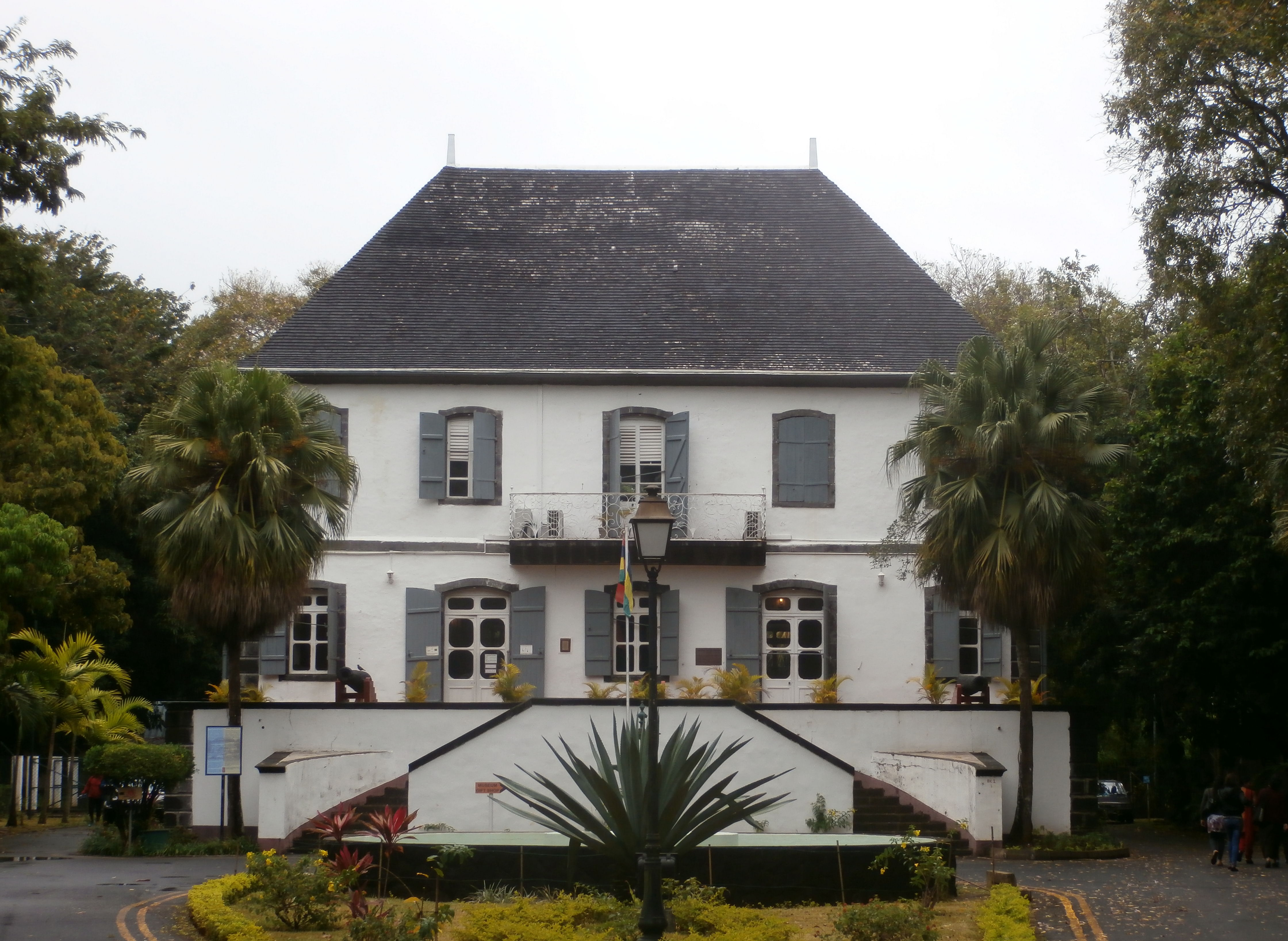
Château Gheude, main museum building in 2013

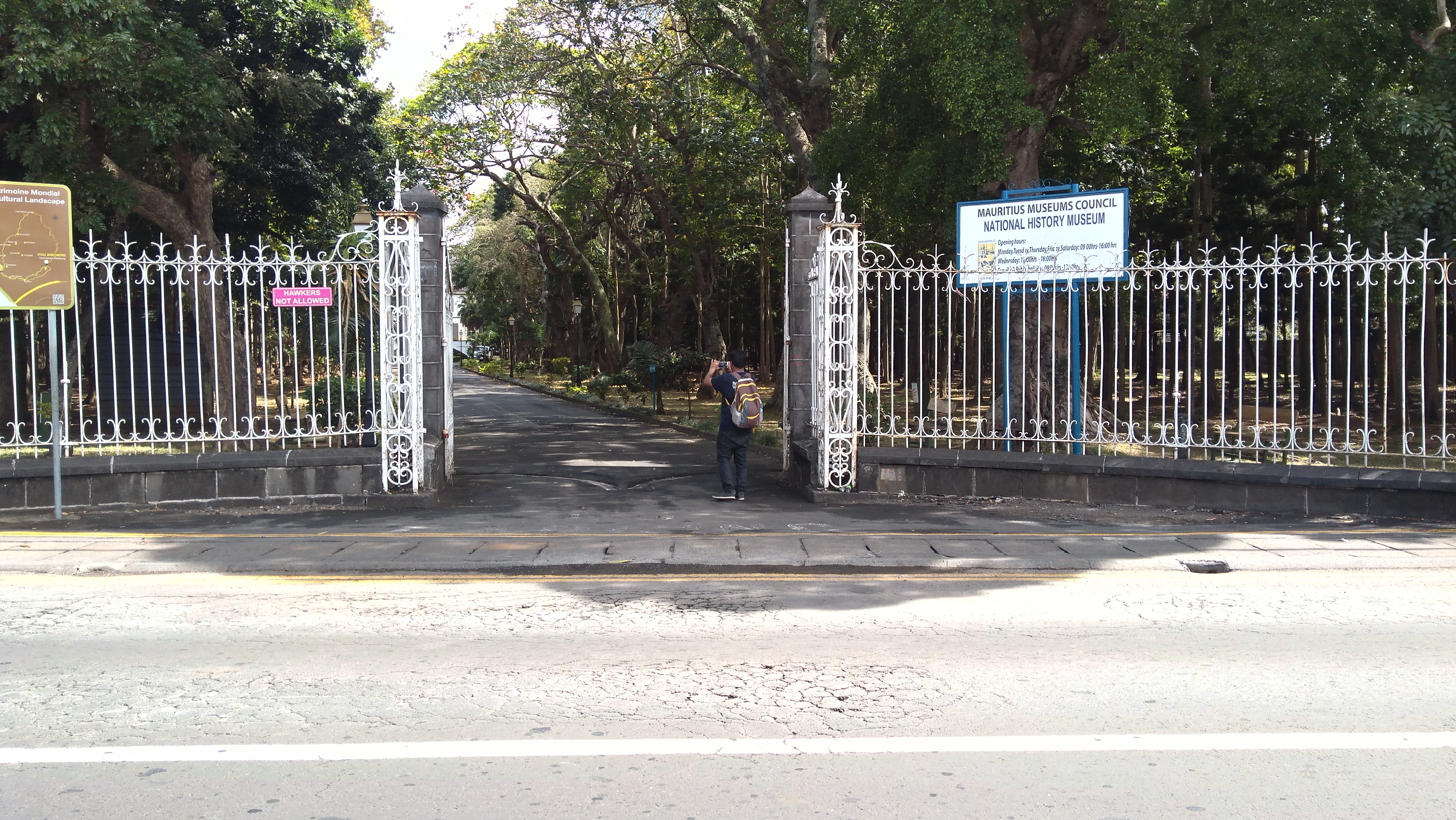
The main gate of the museum

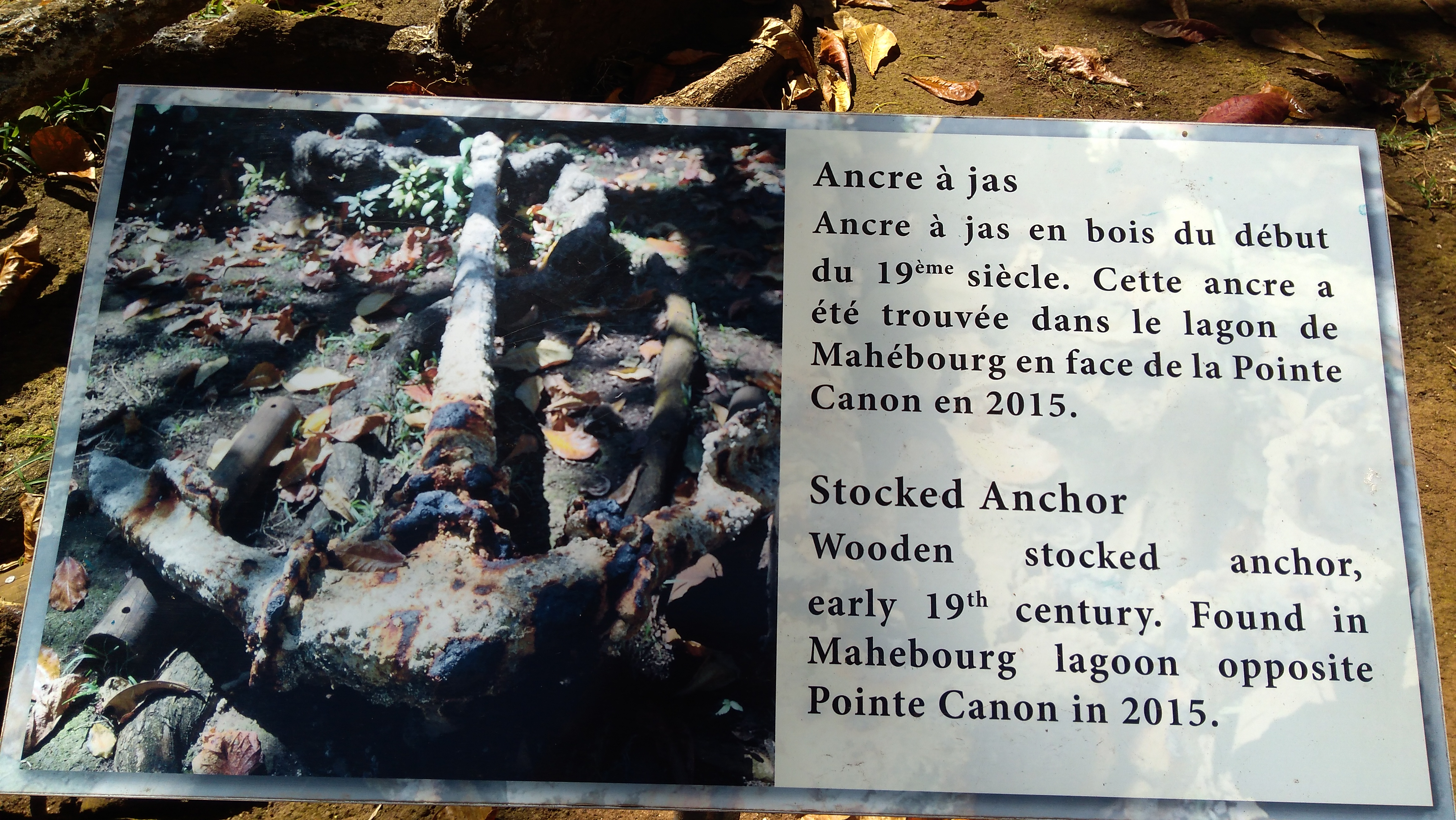
Wooden stocked anchor, early 19th century. Found in Mahebourg lagoon opposite Pointe Canon in 2015

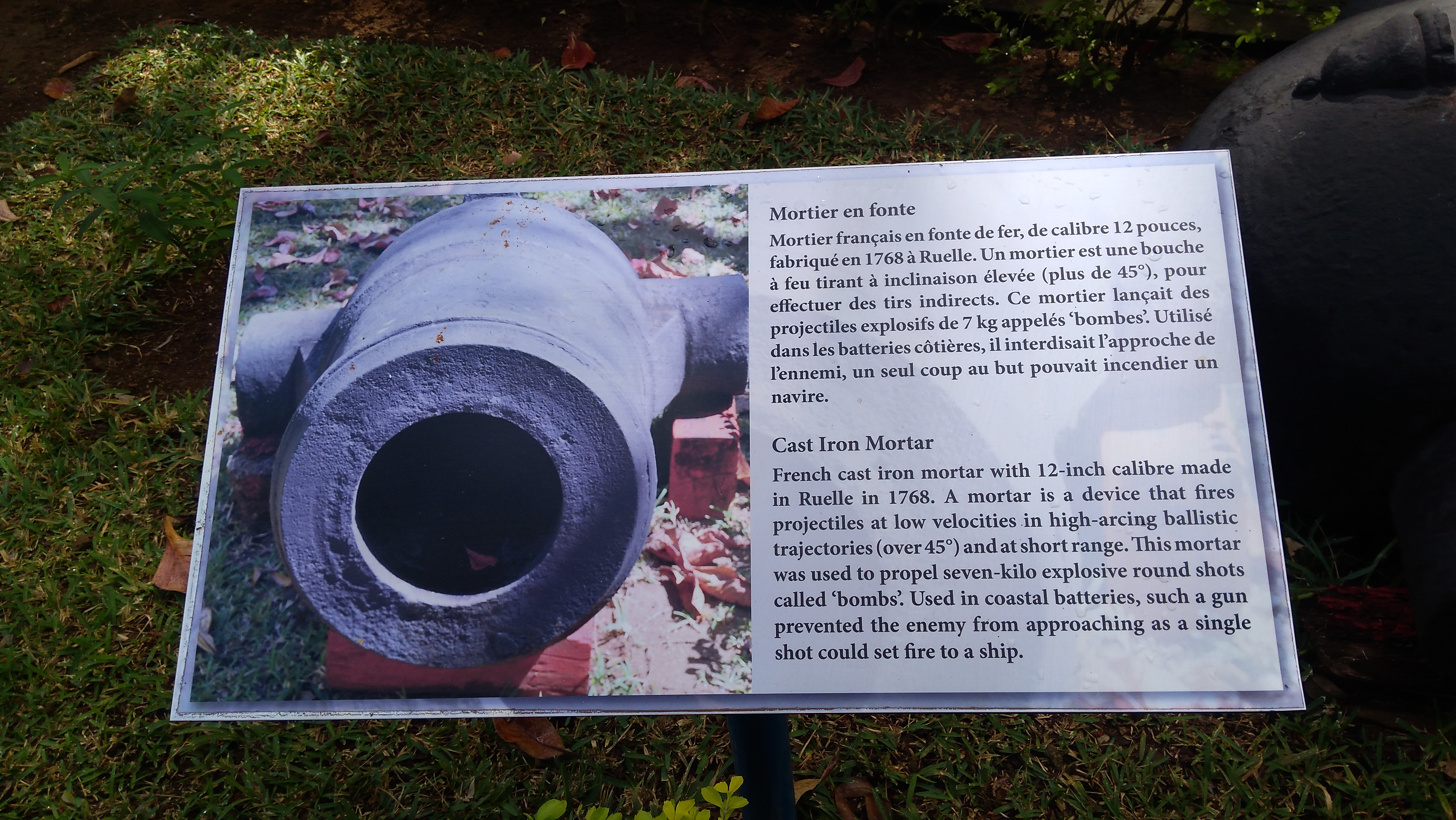
A French cast iron mortar with 12-inch calibre made in Ruelle in 1768.

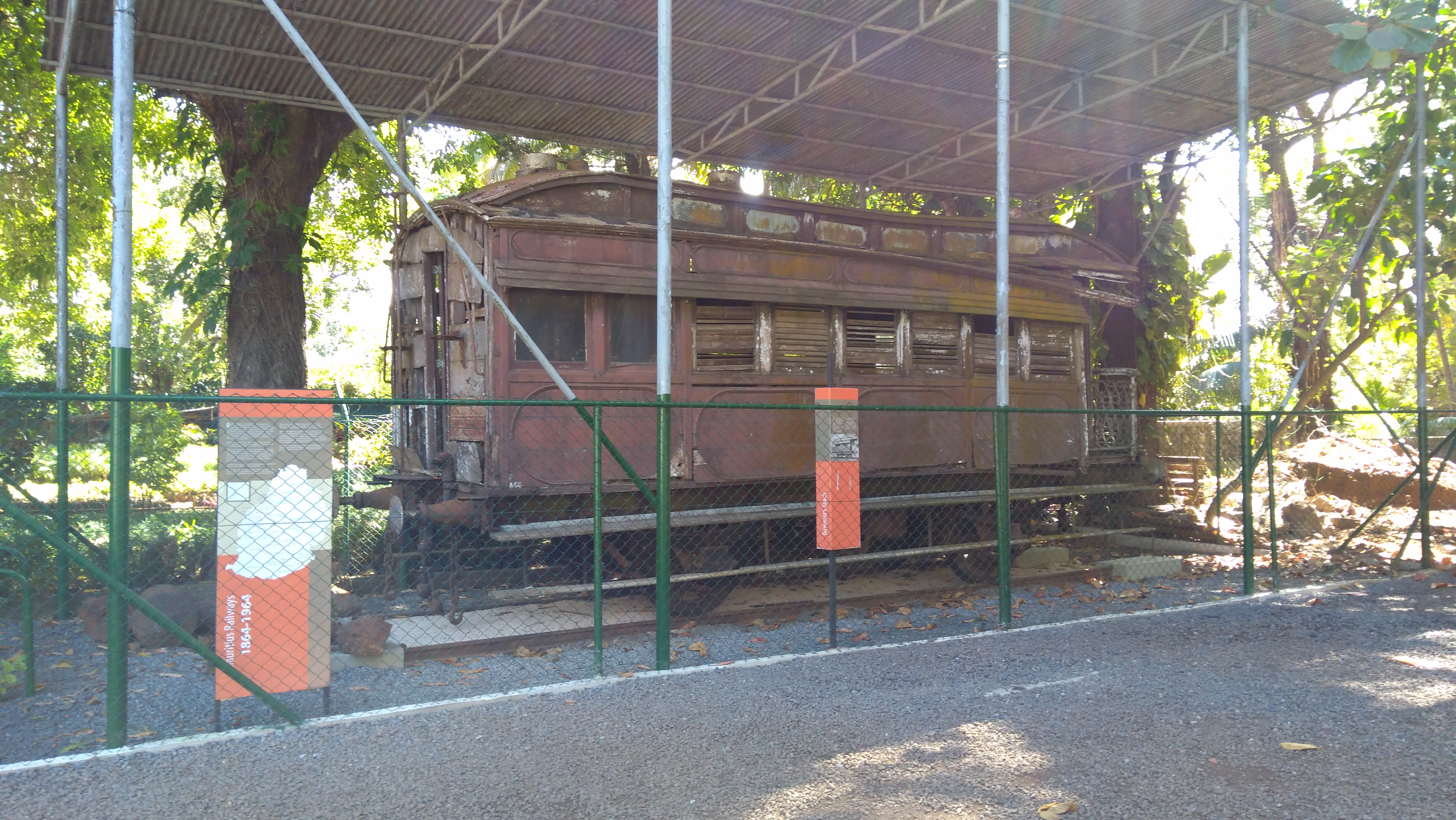
Governor's coach of Mauritius Railway, 1864

== See also ==
- List of museums in Mauritius
