= Eureka House =

Colonial mansion and museum in Mauritius

Coordinates: 20°13′07″S 57°29′51″E

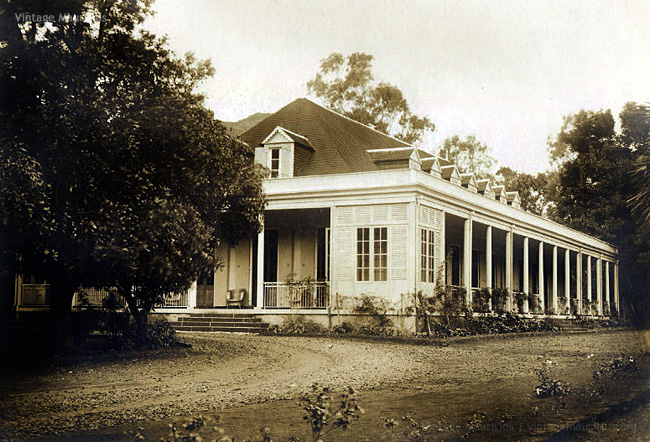
- Eureka House in 1890
- Location: Moka, Moka District, Mauritius

History
- Built: 1830

Site notes
- Architectural style: Creole colonial
- Governing body: Private
- Website: https://www.eureka-house.com/

Eureka House (French: Maison Eureka or La Maison Creole), also known as the House of 109 Doors, is a historic Creole colonial mansion located in Moka, Mauritius. Built in 1830, it is one of the island's best-preserved examples of 19th-century plantation architecture and operates as a museum, guesthouse, and restaurant open to the public.

== History ==
In 1856, the building was purchased from an Englishman by Eugène Le Clézio, an ancestor of Nobel laureate J. M. G. Le Clézio and the first Mauritian President of the Supreme Court. It remained in the family for nearly 120 years. The house was sold only in 1975, before being opened to the public in 1986.

== Architecture ==
The mansion is a wooden Creole-style structure featuring a long veranda, approximately 109 doors and windows, and 40 rooms. Interiors display period furniture, antiques, and artifacts illustrating 19th-century colonial life. The extensive grounds include lush gardens with endemic Mauritian plants (such as mango trees and palms), an English-style garden, and cascading waterfalls along the river.

== Current use ==
Currently, the house functions as a heritage museum offering guided tours. It also includes self-catered guesthouse accommodation, a restaurant serving Mauritian and Creole cuisine.

== See also ==
- Moka District
- List of museums in Mauritius
