= Siberian Crane Memorandum of Understanding =

Memorandum of Understanding Concerning Conservation Measures for the Siberian Crane
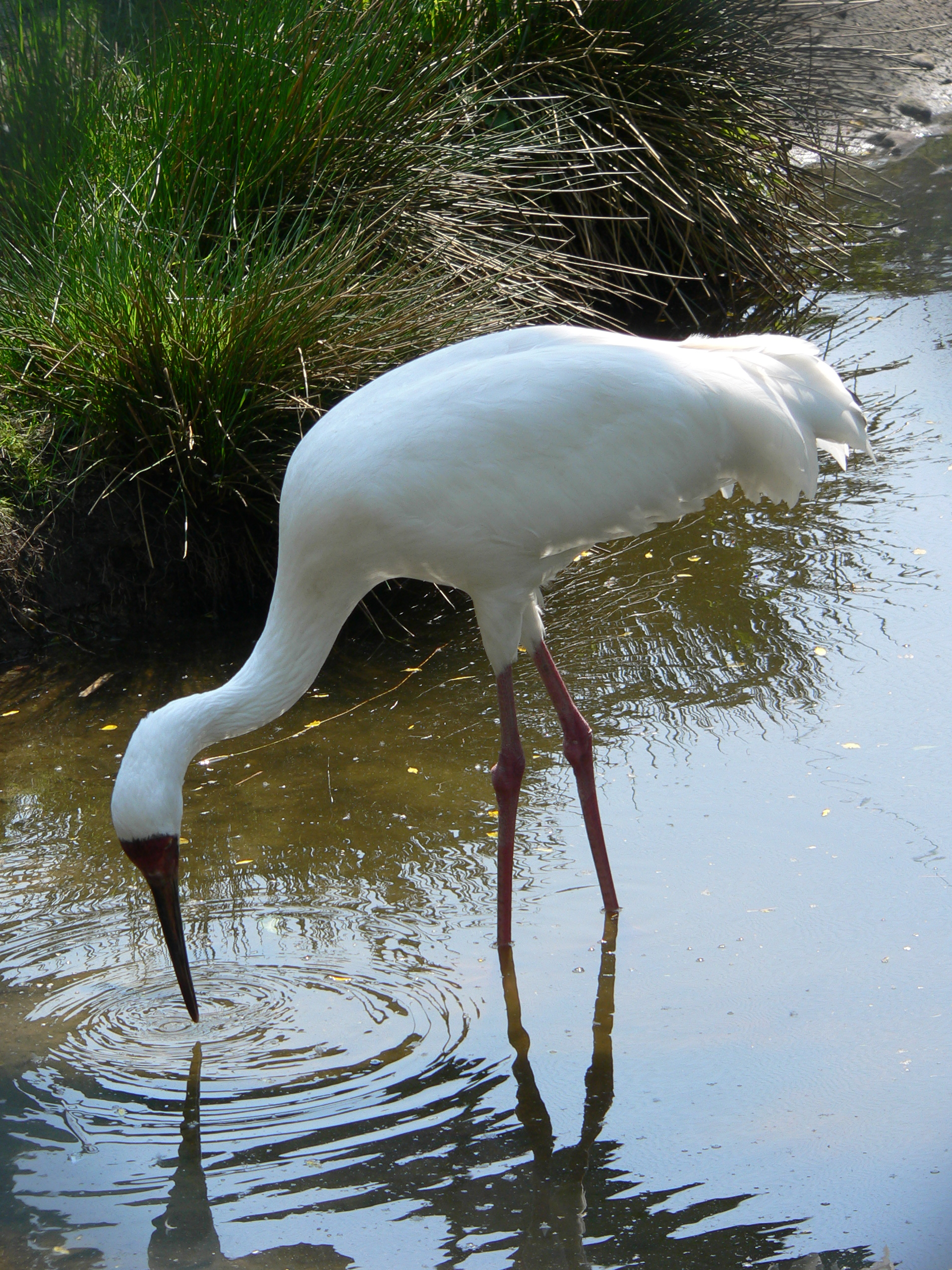
- Context: nature conservation
- Effective: 1 July 1993 (revised version 1 january 1999)
- Signatories: Azerbaijan; India; Iran; Kazakhstan; Pakistan; Turkmenistan; Uzbekistan; China; Russian Federation; Mongolia; Afghanistan
- Languages: English

The Memorandum of Understanding (MoU) Concerning Conservation Measures for the Siberian Crane is a Multilateral Environmental Memorandum of Understanding and came into effect on 1 July 1993 and was amended in January 1999. It was the first MoU to be concluded under the auspices of the Convention on Migratory Species of Wild Animals (CMS), also known as the Bonn Convention, and focuses on conserving the Siberian crane as one of the three rarest crane species. The MoU covers twelve range states (Afghanistan, Azerbaijan, China, India, Islamic Republic of Iran, Japan (vagrant), Kazakhstan, Mongolia, Pakistan, Russian Federation, Turkmenistan and Uzbekistan). As of August 2012, eleven range states have signed the MoU.

== Development of MoU ==
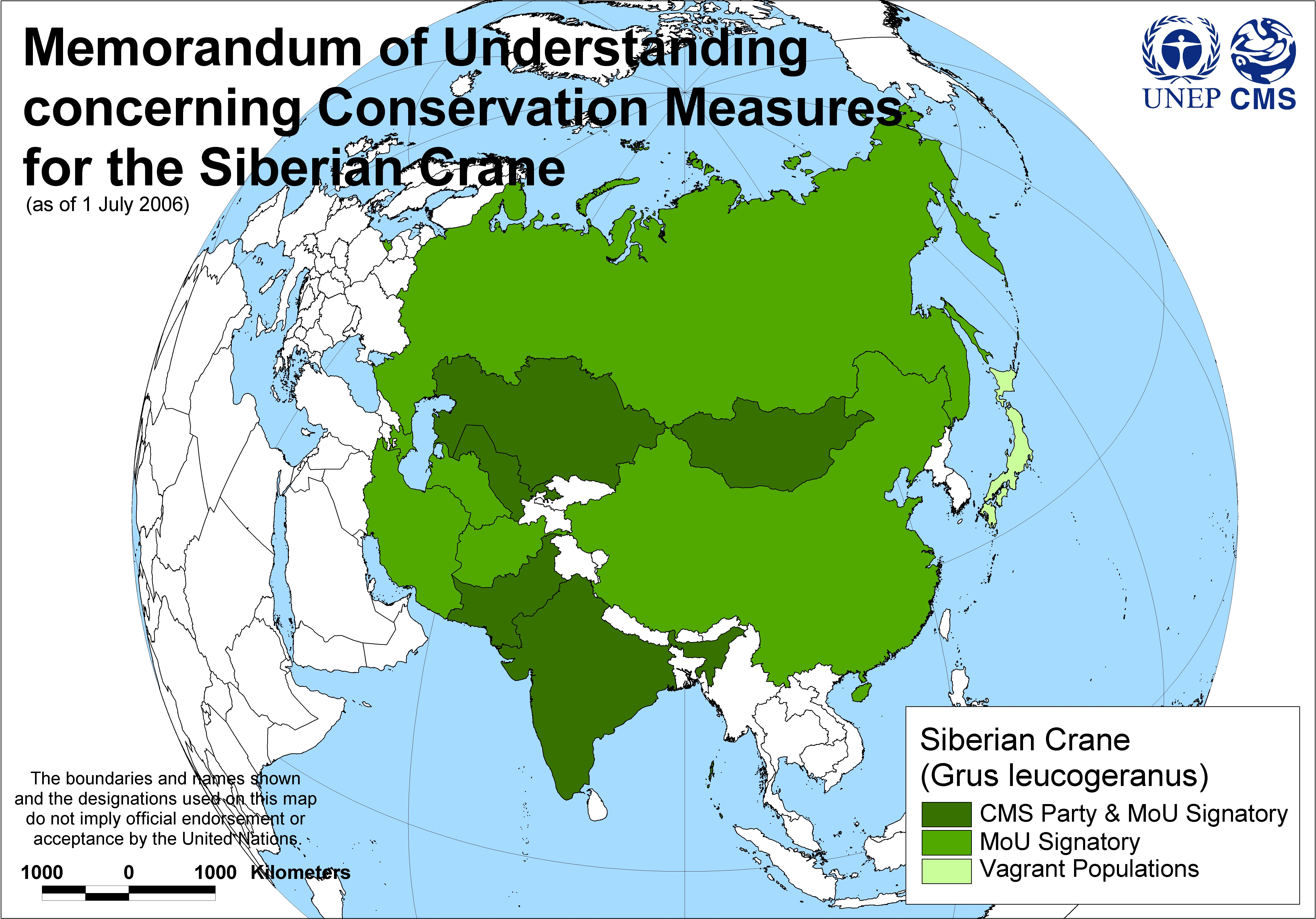
Map of signatories to the Siberian Crane MoU, 1 July 2006

Taking into consideration the unfavorable conservation status of the Siberian crane (Leucogeranus leucogeranus) and the fact that the species has the longest migration route of all crane species ranging from breeding areas in the Arctic regions of Asia to wintering grounds in southern Asia, the range states acknowledged that the species would benefit from international cooperation between the countries. Therefore, as the first one to be conducted under the CMS, an Article IV agreement was concluded and entered into effect on 1 July 1993 and was later revised in January 1999.

Signatories to the Siberian Crane MoU:

- Azerbaijan (13 December 1998)
- India (13 December 1998)
- Islamic Republic of Iran (13 December 1998)
- Kazakhstan (13 December 1998)
- Pakistan (13 December 1998)
- Turkmenistan (13 December 1998)
- Uzbekistan (13 December 1998)
- China (16 April 1999)
- Russian Federation (4 June 2002)
- Mongolia (29 April 2004)
- Afghanistan (22 June 2006)

In addition, the following organizations have signed the MoU:

- CMS Secretariat (13 December 1998)
- International Crane Foundation (13 December 1998)
- Wild Bird Society of Japan (18 May 2000)
- Wetlands International (May 2007)
- Cracid and Crane Breeding and Conservation Centre (May 2007)

== Aim of MoU ==
Siberian crane migration routes

The Siberian crane is facing serious threats with hunting along the migration routes of the western/central population being the most immediate. Although shooting Siberian cranes is prohibited in most of the range states, illegal hunting persists. Another major problem is the habitat deterioration in their staging and wintering areas, especially along the eastern flyway. The MoU aims protecting the species through concerted, coordinated actions in order to prevent disappearance of the remaining populations.

== Species covered by MoU ==
Originally the MoU concentrated on the western and central populations of Siberian cranes, which migrate between breeding grounds in western Siberia and wintering sites in Iran and India. The scope of the MoU was extended in 1998 to cover the larger eastern Asian population which winters around Poyang Lake, China, and accounts for over 95 percent of the birds.

== Fundamental components ==
All signatories, being aware that the western and central populations of the Siberian crane have been reduced to the brink of extinction, and that the status of the eastern population is threatened, agree to work closely together to improve the conservation status of the species throughout its breeding, migrating and wintering range. To that end, they shall:

1. Provide strict protection for Siberian crane and identify and conserve the wetland habitats essential for their survival
2. Implement in their respective countries the provisions of the Conservation Plan, annexed to the MoU as a basis for conserving the species populations
3. Facilitate the expeditious exchange of scientific, technical and legal information needed to coordinate conservation measures and cooperate with recognized scientists of international organizations and other range states in order to facilitate their work conducted in relation to the Conservation Plan
4. Provide the CMS Secretariat a report on implementation of the MoU

The revised MoU took effect on 1 January 1999 and shall remain in effect indefinitely subject to the right of any signatory to terminate its participation by providing one year's written notice to all of the other signatories.

== Meetings ==
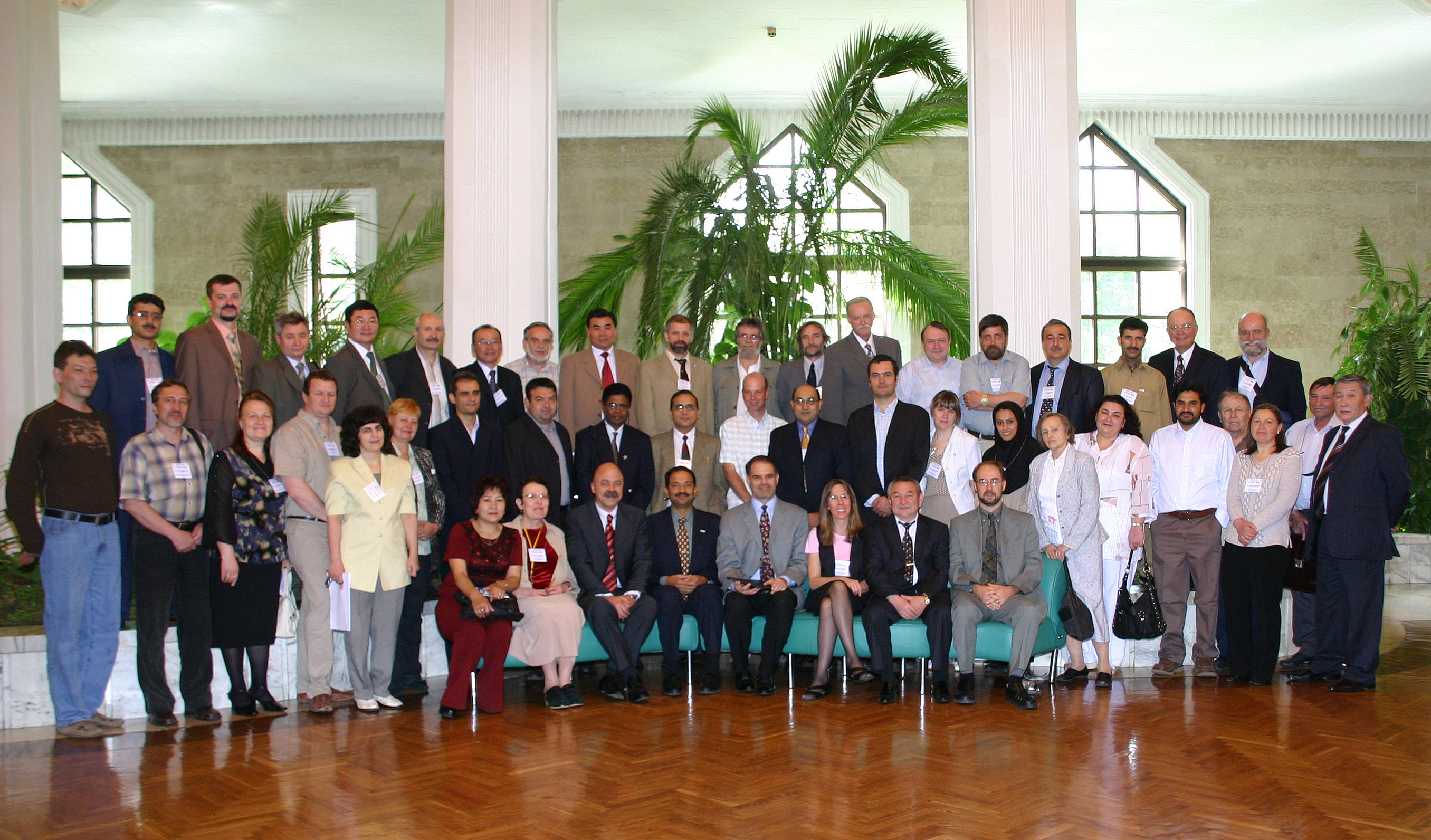
Sixth Meeting of Signatories to the Siberian Crane MoU, Almaty, Kazakhstan, May 2007

Meetings of signatories are organized regularly to review the conservation status and the implementation of the MoU and Conservation Plan. National reports by individual signatories as well as an overview report prepared by the secretariat are also submitted. As of August 2012, seven meetings have been held:

- First Meeting of Signatories, Moscow, Russian Federation, May 1995
- Second Meeting of Signatories, Bharatpur, India, November 1996
- Third Meeting of Signatories, Ramsar, Islamic Republic of Iran, December 1998
- Fourth Meeting of Signatories, Baraboo, Wisconsin, USA, May 2001
- Fifth Meeting of Signatories, Moscow, Russian Federation, April 2004
- Sixth Meeting of Signatories, Almaty, Kazakhstan, May 2007
- Seventh Meeting of Signatories, Bonn, Germany, June 2010

The most recent meeting to date was the Seventh meeting held in Germany, June 2010. This meeting reviewed a conservation status report, discussed progress in the designation of new sites for the Western/Central Asian Critical Network (WCACN), considered the scope for synergies with the Agreement on the conservation of African Eurasian Migratory Waterbirds (AEWA), agreed action priorities for each country, and adopted revised action plans for the three Siberian Crane Flyways. The Eighth meeting is scheduled to take place in 2013.

== Secretariat ==
The CMS Secretariat – located in Bonn, Germany – acts as the secretariat to the MoU. One of the tasks of the secretariat is to organize the regular meetings of signatories and prepare an overview report compiled on the basis of information at its disposal.

== Conservation Plan ==
A Conservation Plan is annexed to the MoU and provides a road map to guide the implementation of conservation action for the Siberian crane in the range states. In May 2001, conservation plans for the western, central and eastern populations have been drawn up and included several programmes and specific activities required to restore the populations. The overall aim of the three plans were to reduce mortality in the remaining populations, to protect and manage their habitats and enhance cooperation among the range states and other concerned agencies. As from 2007 one conservation plan for the three populations was agreed upon. The latest plan was adopted for the period 2010–2012. The main objectives of the plans are:

- Reduce mortality
- Monitor and research
- Increase numbers and genetic diversity
- Protect and manage habitats of importance for the Siberian crane
- Increase public awareness and ecological education
- Enhance national and international cooperation and information exchange among the range states and other partner organizations

== Activities and Successes ==
=== Siberian Crane Wetland Project (SCWP) ===
The Global Environment Facility (GEF) approved a US$10 million, six-year project called “Development of a Wetland Site and Flyway Network for Conservation of the Siberian Crane and Other Migratory Waterbirds in Asia”, also commonly known as the Siberian Crane Wetland Project. The project aims to protect a network of globally important wetlands in Asia for migratory waterbirds and uses the Siberian crane as a flagship species, linking activities at 16 key wetlands along the species’ western and eastern flyways in Russia, Kazakhstan, Iran and China. The main concentration of the project is strengthening national legislation, policy planning and enforcement, cooperation and training. The project started in April 2003 and finished in December 2009. Project outcomes include:

- 5 new Ramsar Sites and one World Heritage Site
- 4 new protected areas
- 3 protected areas expanded by a combined total of over 1 million h
- 3 protected areas upgraded
- Management plans completed for most sites
- Stakeholder committees established for most sites
- Community co-management pilot projects at selected sites, e.g. co-management programmes with local hunters in Iran
- Water management plans linked to river basin plans at 4 sites in NE China and Naurzum in Kazakhstan. Releases of water to restore wetlands at 3 sites
- Immediate threats mitigated including removal of an oil well in West Siberia and re-routing of powerlines in Yakutia
- Ecological research provided information to support environmental impact assessment of development proposals at Poyang Lake
- Waterbird monitoring programmes established, including surveys of Siberian crane breeding grounds, migration sites in Russia, China and Kazakhstan, and wintering areas in Iran and Poyang Lake Basin
- Significant strengthening of Kazakhstan's protected area system, along with a national environmental education programme
- Strengthening of international cooperation for flyway conservation
- Establishment of an innovative new protected area system in western Russia, including the creation of a National Park around the project site
- Annual crane celebrations at more than 120 sites in nine countries in western Asia

The final report “Safe Flyways for the Siberian Crane” was launched at the UNEP General Council Meeting on February 24, 2010. Overall, the SCWP strengthened the network of wetlands along the Siberian crane's flyways through improving site protection and management, e.g. GIS training for project consultants and reserve staff in Kazakhstan, international recognition through site designations under CMS, Ramsar and World Heritage Conventions, securing water supplies to water-stressed wetlands, integrating stakeholders concern and decision making into reserve management and undertaking education and awareness programs at local, national and flyway levels, e.g. crane celebrations.

=== Western/Central Asian Site Network for Siberian Cranes and Other Waterbirds (WCASN) ===
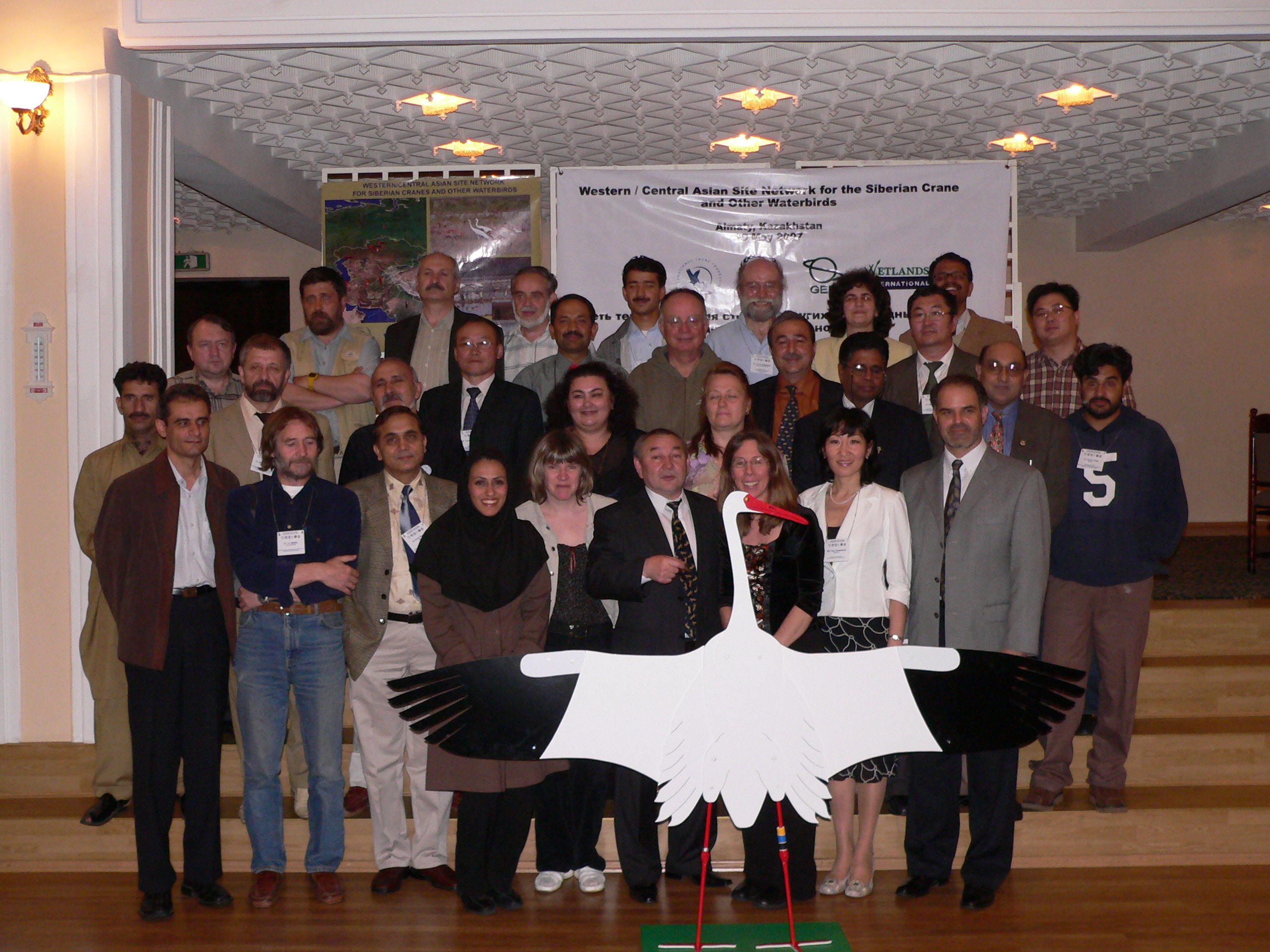
Launch of WCASN during Sixth Meeting of Signatories, Almaty, Kazakhstan, May 2007

The WCASN was formally launched on 18 March 2007 in Kazakhstan, in a special signing ceremony held during the Sixth Meeting of Signatories to the MoU. It is the first step towards developing a more comprehensive site network for migratory waterbirds under a wider framework proposed within the Central Asian Flyway (CAF) Initiative under CMS. WCASN focuses on conservation efforts on sites of international importance for the Siberian crane along its west and central Asian flyways and its goal is to ensure the conservation of the species through recognition an appropriate management of a network of internationally important sites.
