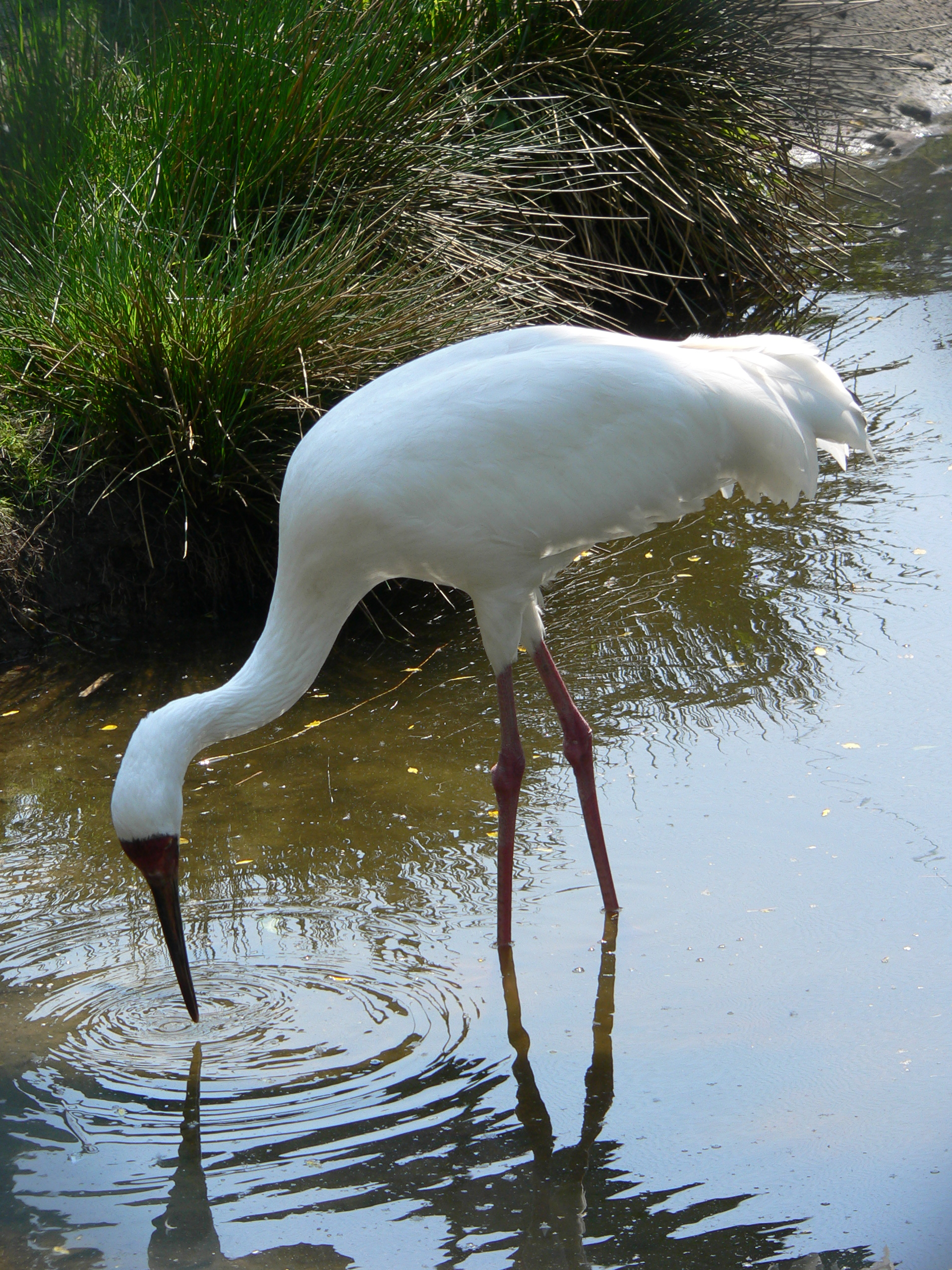
- A captive individual in a zoo

Conservation status
- Critically Endangered (IUCN 3.1)
- CITES Appendix I

Scientific classification
- Kingdom: Animalia
- Phylum: Chordata
- Class: Aves
- Order: Gruiformes
- Family: Gruidae
- Genus: Leucogeranus; Bonaparte, 1855
- Species: L. leucogeranus

Binomial name
- Leucogeranus leucogeranus (Pallas, 1773)
- Migration routes, breeding and wintering sites

Synonyms
- Bugeranus leucogeranus; Sarcogeranus Ieucogeranus; Grus leucogeranus

= Siberian crane =

Species of bird

The Siberian crane (Leucogeranus leucogeranus), also known as the Siberian white crane or the snow crane, is a bird of the family Gruidae, the cranes. They are distinctive among the cranes: adults are nearly all snowy white, except for their black primary feathers that are visible in flight, and with two breeding populations in the Arctic tundra of western and eastern Russia. The eastern populations migrate during winter to China, while the western population winters in Iran and (formerly) in Bharatpur, India.

Among the cranes, they make the longest distance migrations. Their populations, particularly those in the western range, have declined drastically in the 20th century due to hunting along their migration routes and habitat degradation. The world population was estimated in 2010 at about 3,200 birds, mostly belonging to the eastern population with about 93% of them wintering in the Poyang Lake basin in China, a habitat that may be altered by the Three Gorges Dam. The population in 2024 was estimated to have expanded to about 5,500 individuals.

== Taxonomy and systematics ==
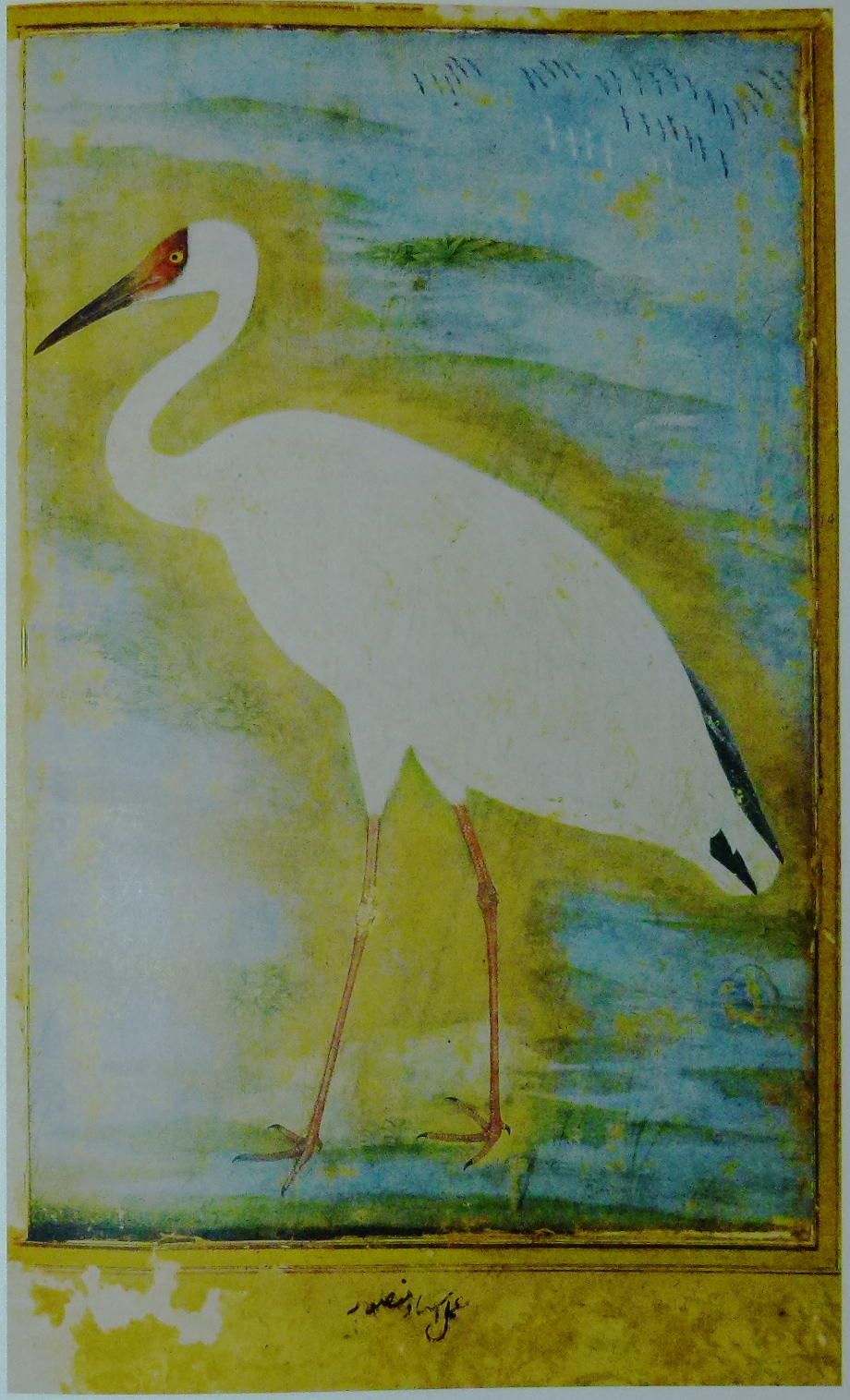
Mughal era painting of a Siberian crane by Ustad Mansur (c. 1625)

The Siberian crane was formally described by Peter Simon Pallas in 1773 and given the binomial name Grus leucogeranus. The specific epithet is derived from the classical Greek words leukos for "white" and geranos for a "crane". Ustad Mansur, a 17th-century court artist and singer of Jahangir, had illustrated a Siberian crane about 100 years earlier. The genus Megalornis was used for the cranes by George Robert Gray and this species was included in it, while Richard Bowdler Sharpe suggested a separation from Grus and used the genus Sarcogeranus. The Siberian crane lacks the complex tracheal coils found in most other cranes but shares this feature with the wattled crane. The unison call differed from that of most cranes and some authors suggested that the Siberian crane belonged in the genus Bugeranus along with the wattled crane. Comparisons of the DNA sequences of cytochrome-b however suggest that the Siberian crane is basal among the Gruinae and the wattled crane is retained as the sole species in the genus Bugeranus and placed as a sister to the Anthropoides cranes.

A molecular phylogenetic study published in 2010 found that the genus Grus, as then defined, was polyphyletic. In the resulting rearrangement to create monophyletic genera, the Siberian crane was moved to the resurrected genus Leucogeranus. The genus Leucogeranus had been introduced by the French biologist Charles Lucien Bonaparte in 1855.

== Description ==
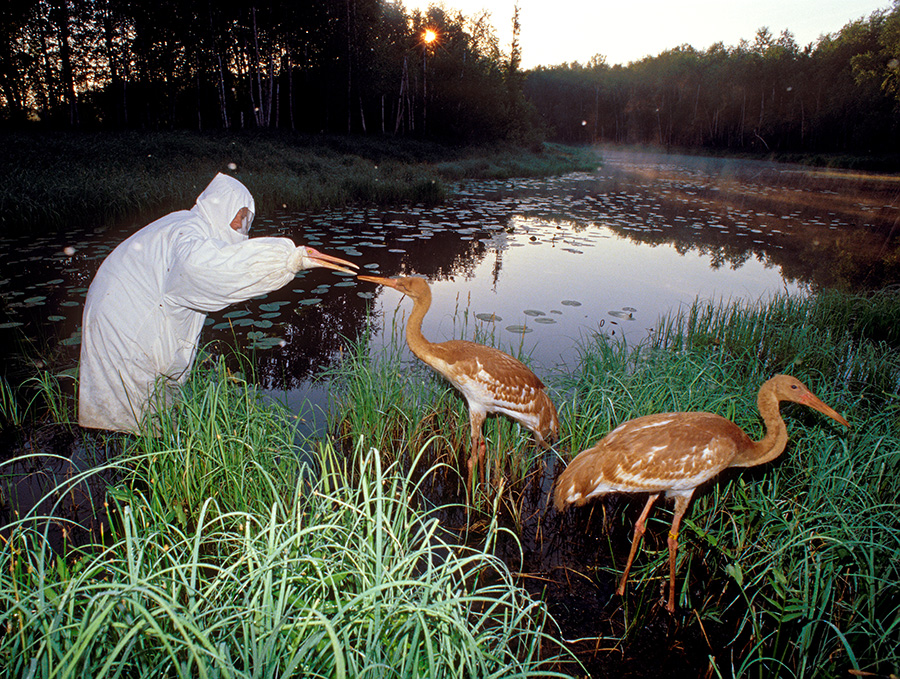
Juveniles at Oka Nature Reserve nursery

Adults of both sexes have a pure white plumage except for the black primaries, alula and primary coverts. The fore-crown, face and side of head is bare and brick red, the bill is dark and the legs are pinkish. The iris is yellowish. Juveniles are feathered on the face and the plumage is dingy brown. There are no elongated tertial feathers as in some other crane species. During breeding season, both the male and female cranes are often seen with mud streaking their feathers; they may intentionally smear mud on their feathers, which has been hypothesized to aid camouflage on the nest. The call is very different from the trumpeting of most cranes and is a goose-like high pitched whistling toyoya. This is a fairly large species of crane, typically weighing 4.9–8.6 kg (11–19 lb) and standing about 140 cm (4 ft 7 in) tall. The wingspan is reportedly from 210 to 260 cm (6 ft 11 in to 8 ft 6 in) and length is 115–127 cm (45–50 in). Males are on average larger than females. (Note: References:) The average weight of adults in one study was 6.81 kg (15.0 lb) while juvenile birds were slightly heavier on average at 7.1 kg (16 lb). There is a single record of an outsized male of this species weighing 15 kg (33 lb). Usually, this crane is usually slightly smaller in weight and height than some other cranes, particularly the sarus crane, wattled crane and red-crowned crane.

== Distribution and habitat ==
The breeding area of the Siberian crane formerly extended between the Urals and Ob River south to the Ishim and Tobol rivers and east to the Kolyma region. The populations declined with changes in landuse, the draining of wetlands for agricultural expansion and hunting on their migration routes. The breeding areas in modern times are restricted to two widely disjunct regions. The western area in the river basins of the Ob, Konda and Sossva and to the east a much larger population in Yakutia between the Yana and the Alazeya rivers. Like most cranes, the Siberian crane inhabits shallow marshlands and wetlands and will often forage in deeper water than other cranes. They show very high site fidelity for both their wintering and breeding areas, making use of the same sites year after year. The western population winters in Iran and some individuals formerly wintered in India south to Nagpur and east to Bihar. The eastern populations winter mainly in the Poyang Lake area in China.

== Behaviour and ecology ==
Siberian cranes are widely dispersed in their breeding areas and are highly territorial. They maintain feeding territories in winter but may form small and loose flocks, and gather closer at their winter roosts. They are very diurnal, feeding almost all throughout the day. When feeding on submerged vegetation, they often immerse their heads entirely underwater. When calling, the birds stretch their neck forward. The contexts of several calls have been identified and several of these vary with sex. Individual variation is very slight and most calls have a dominant frequency of about 1.4 kHz. The unison calls, duets between paired males and female however are more distinctive with marked differences across pairs. The female produces a higher pitched call which is the "loo" in the duetted "doodle-loo" call. Pairs will walk around other pairs to threaten them and drive them away from their territory. In captivity, one individual was recorded to have lived for nearly 62 years while another lived for 83 years.

=== Feeding ===
These cranes are omnivorous with a tendency to plant matter. In the summer grounds they feed on a range of plants including the roots of hellebore (Veratrum misae), seeds of Empetrum nigrum as well as small rodents like lemmings and voles, earthworms, and fish. They were earlier thought to be predominantly fish eating on the basis of the serrated edge of their bill, but later studies suggest that they take animal prey mainly when the vegetation is covered by snow. They also swallow pebbles and grit to aid in crushing food in their crop. In their wintering grounds in China, they have been noted to feed to a large extent on the submerged leaves of Vallisneria spiralis. Specimens wintering in India have been found to have mainly aquatic plants in their stomachs. They are however noted to pick up beetles and bird's eggs in captivity.

=== Breeding ===
Siberian cranes return to the Arctic tundra around the end of April and beginning of May. The nest is usually on the edge of lake in boggy ground and is usually surrounded by water. Most eggs are laid in the first week of June when the tundra is snow free. The usual clutch is two eggs, which are incubated by the female after the second egg is laid, with the male standing guard nearby. The eggs hatch in about 27 to 29 days. The young birds fledge in about 80 days. Usually only a single chick survives due to aggression between young birds. The population increase per year is less than 10%, the lowest recruitment rate among cranes. Their success in breeding may further be hampered by disturbance from reindeer and sometimes dogs that accompany reindeer herders. Captive breeding was achieved by the International Crane Foundation at Baraboo after numerous failed attempts. Males often killed their mates and captive breeding was achieved by artificial insemination and the hatching of eggs by other crane species such as the sandhill and using floodlights to simulate the longer daylengths of the Arctic summer.

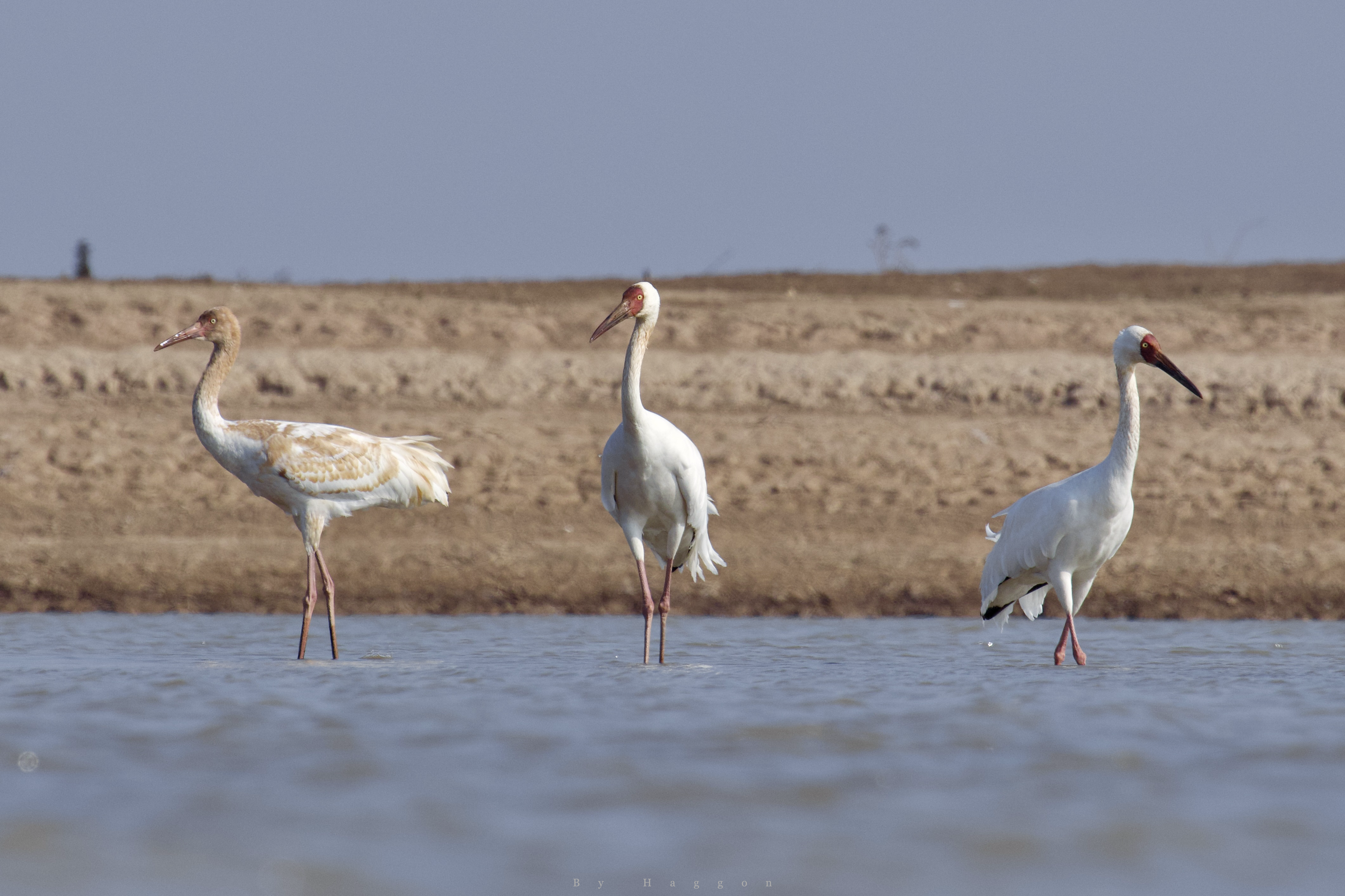
A Siberian crane family at Poyang Lake, Jiangxi, China

=== Migration ===
This species breeds in two disjunct regions in the arctic tundra of Russia; the western population along the Ob, Yakutia, and western Siberia. It is a long distance migrant and among the cranes, makes one of the longest migrations. The eastern population winters on the Yangtze River and Lake Poyang in China, and the western population in Fereydoon Kenar in Iran. The central population, which once wintered in Keoladeo National Park, Bharatpur, is extinct.

== Status and conservation ==
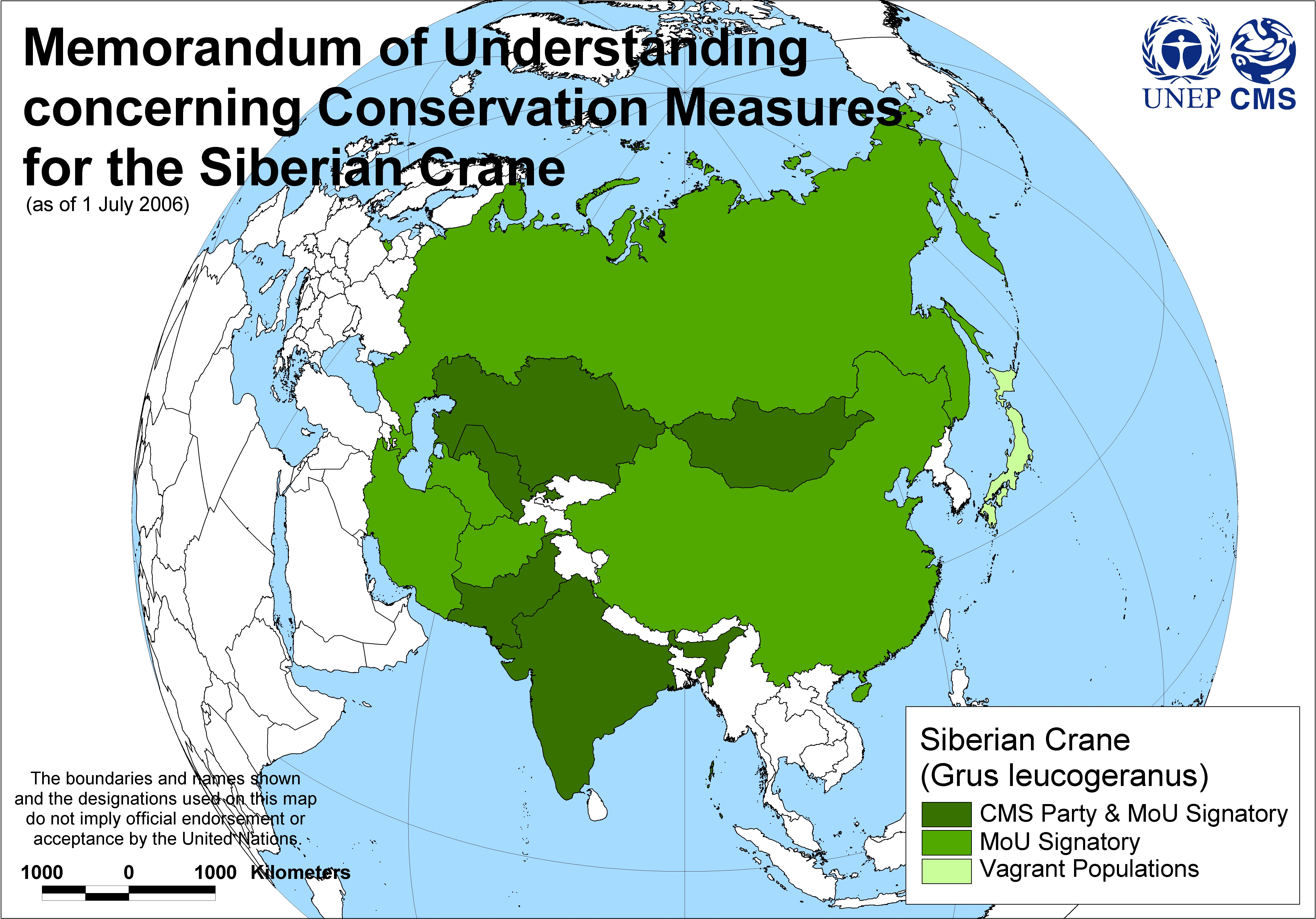
Map Signatories to Siberian Crane memorandum (MoU)

The conservation status of the Siberian crane is very serious. In 2008, the decreasing world population was estimated to be around 3500–4000 individuals, nearly all of them belonging to the eastern breeding population. Of the 15 crane species, this is the only regarded as critically endangered, the highest threatened category by the IUCN. (The whooping crane of North America has a smaller but rising population that is better protected, giving the species a status of endangered.) The western population of the Siberian crane had dwindled to four in 2002 and subsequently it was thought to be extirpated, but a single individual, named "Omid", has wintered in Iran since 2006–2007. In 2022, conservationists in Iran attempted to re-establish a western population by introducing a captive-bred female named Roya to accompany Omid. Roya was born and raised in Belgium as part of an international collaboration and was transferred to Iran to encourage breeding. Despite widespread attention and hope, the project was unsuccessful as Roya failed to adapt to the natural habitat and now lives in captivity. The wintering site at Poyang in China holds an estimated 98% of the population and is threatened by hydrological changes caused by the Three Gorges Dam and other water development projects.

Historical records from India suggest a wider winter distribution in the past including records from Gujarat, near New Delhi and even as far east as Bihar. In the 19th century, larger numbers of birds were noted to visit India. They were sought after by hunters and specimen collectors. In 1974, as many as 75 birds wintered in Bharatpur, but this population declined to a single pair in 1992 and the last bird was seen in 2002. An individual that escaped from a private menagerie was shot in the Outer Hebrides in 1891. The western population may even have wintered as far west as Egypt along the Nile.

Satellite telemetry was used to track the migration of a flock that wintered in Iran. They were noted to rest on the eastern end of the Volga Delta. Satellite telemetry was also used to track the migration of the eastern population in the mid-1990s, leading to the discovery of new resting areas along the species' flyway in eastern Russia and China. The Siberian crane is one of the species to which the Agreement on the Conservation of African-Eurasian Migratory Waterbirds (AEWA) applies and is subject of the Memorandum of Understanding concerning Conservation Measures for the Siberian Crane concluded under the Bonn Convention.

== Significance in human culture ==
For the Yakuts and Yukaghirs, the white crane is a sacred bird associated with sun, spring and kind celestial spirits ajyy. In Yakut epics, Olonkho shamans and shamanesses transform into white cranes.

== Gallery ==
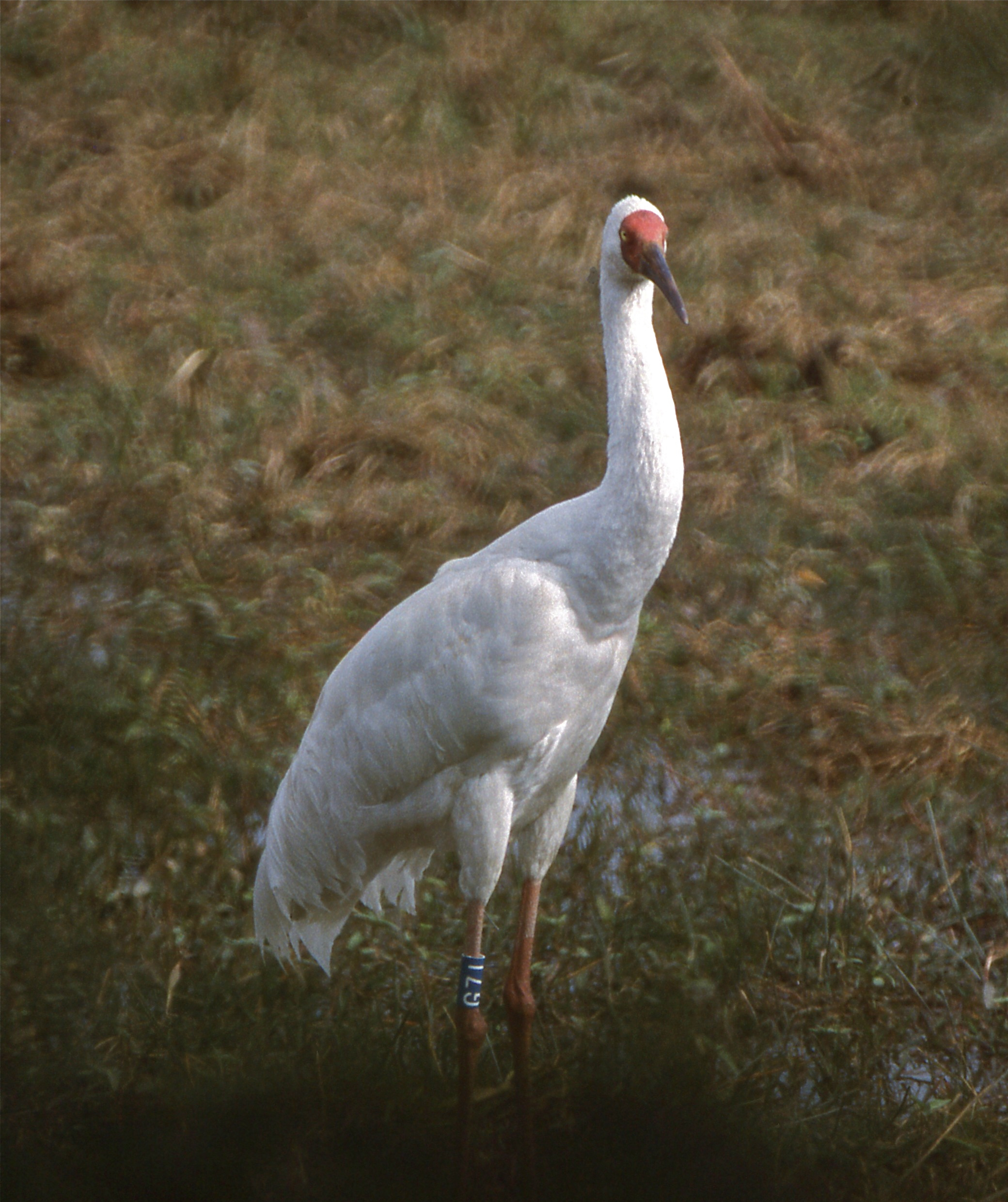
A Siberian crane in Keoladeo National Park, near Bharatpur, India, in 1996

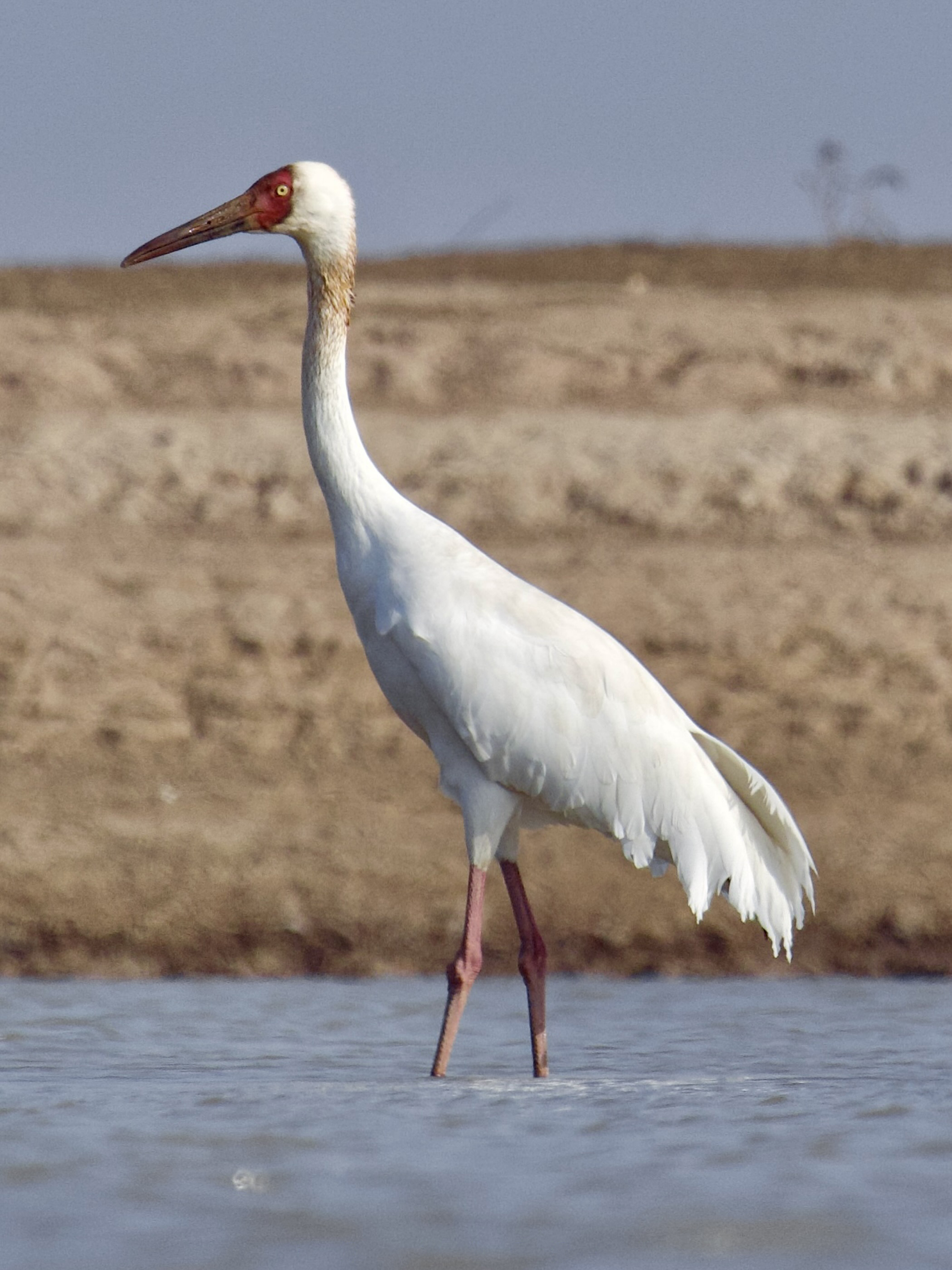
An adult Siberian crane spotted at the Poyang Lake, China, in 2023

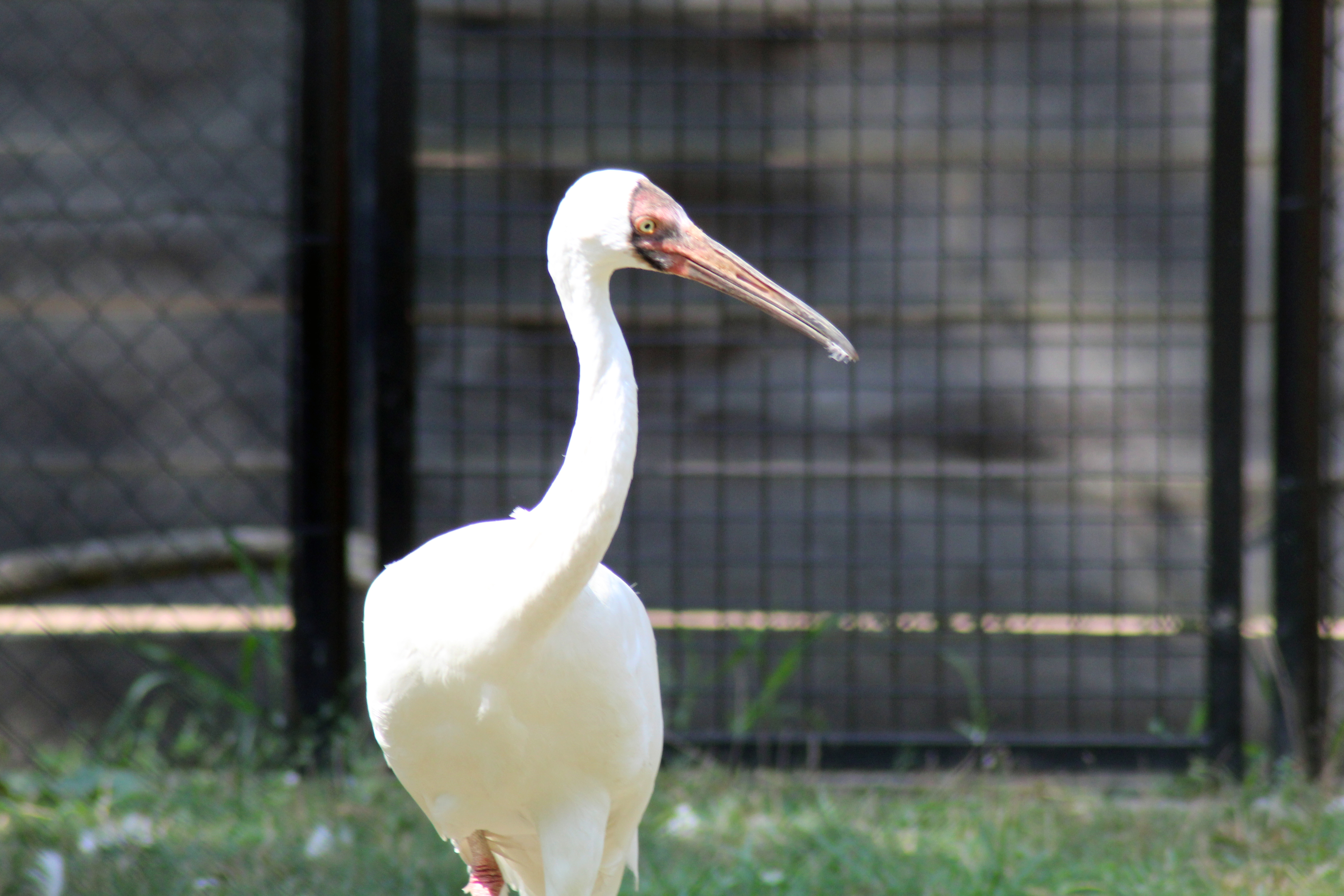
A captive Siberian crane in the Zoological park of Labenne, near Bayonne, France, 2019
