= Ustad Mansur =

Mughal painter and court artist (died 1624)

- Died: 1624
- Years active: c. 1590–1624
- Known for: Painting
- Movement: Animal painting Nature Painting; Mughal Painting

Ustad Mansur (died 1624) was a seventeenth-century Indian painter and naturalist who served as a Mughal court artist. During this period, he excelled at depicting plants and animals, was the earliest artist to depict the dodo in colour, and was the first to illustrate the Siberian crane. Towards the end of Akbar's reign, he gained the title of ustad (master) and during the reign of Mughal Emperor Jahangir his masterpieces earned him the title of Nãdir-al-’Asr (Unequalled of the age). Although he was largely known for his natural history illustrations, he also portrayed people in various manuscript illustrations.

The Dodo depiction of Ustad mansur is currently in the oriental institute of St Petersburg. It is not exposed to the public. The dodo museum in Mauritius is the only museum in the world featuring an exhibit of the Mansur dodo drawing. The Dodo Museum also feature a unique real size paleo reconstruction of the dodo based on Ustad Mansur dodo worldwide.

== Life and work ==
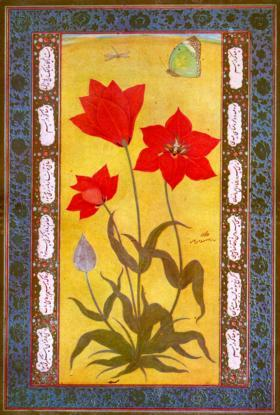
Tulip from Kashmir (c. 1610) by Mansur Naqqash

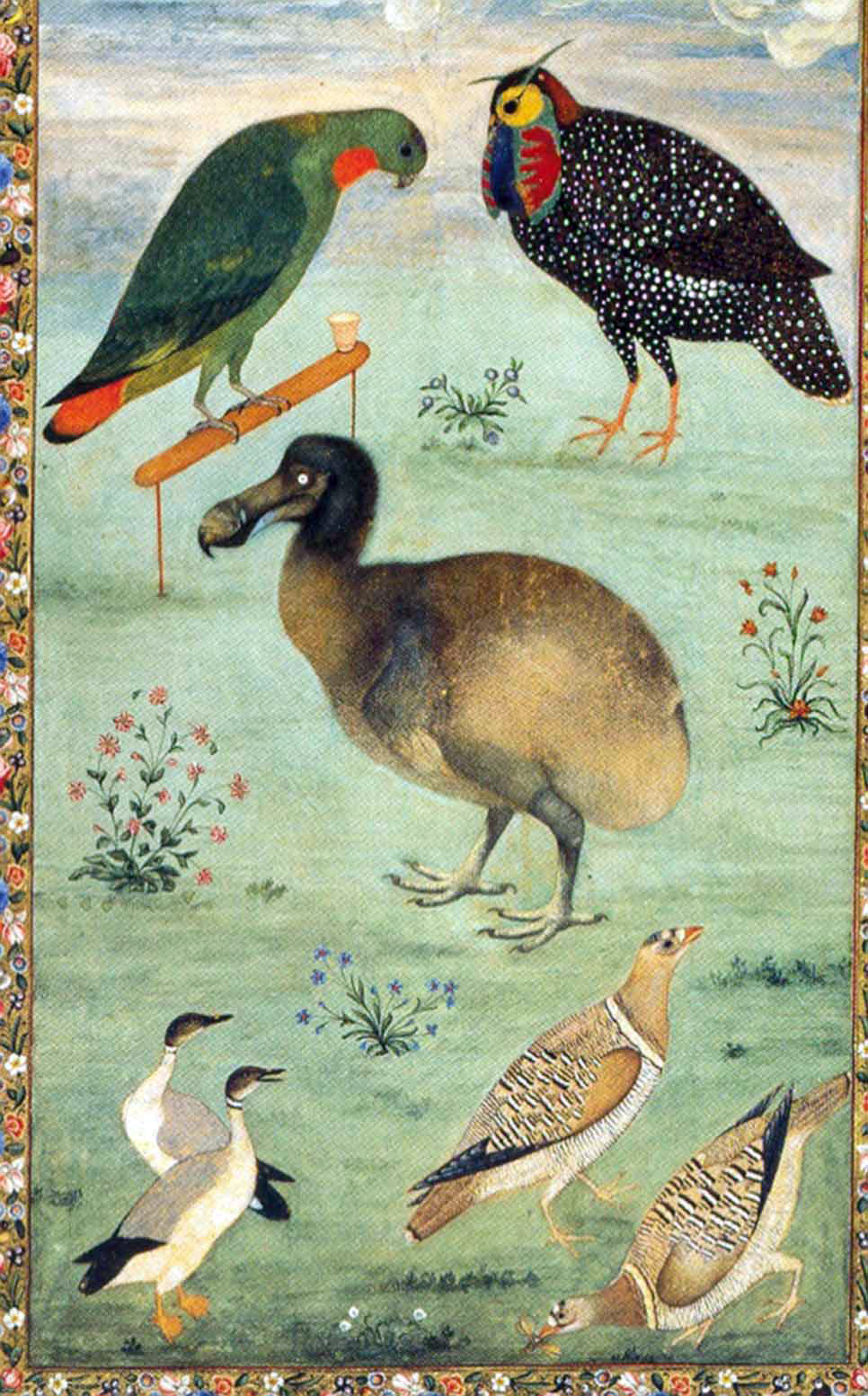
A painting depicting the dodo ascribed to Ustad Mansur dated to the period 1628–1633. This is one of the few coloured images of the dodo made from a living specimen.

The year of Mansur's birth is unknown. His name was suffixed in some early miniatures as Naqqash, which can refer to an artist, painter, or carver, indicating that he came from a family that was in an artistic profession. A single miniature showing 'Babur meeting his sister' (folio 8, National Museum) is attributed to Mansur but he otherwise finds no mention in Babur's memoirs (Baburnama). He was associated with other artists of the period including Basawan, Miskina and Nanha. During Akbar's reign he appears to have been involved only as a colourist in the plates for the Book of Akbar (Akbarnama) and his name is not mentioned by Abu'l-Fazl among the list of artists. Akbar followed the principle that all artwork should include the name of the artist on the margin. The British Museum's copy of the Akbarnama (1604) includes some folios (35,110a,110b and 112a) where his name is prefixed with "ustad" (=master), indicating his rise to excellence.

Early works included parts of portraits and other scenes. The earliest works were made as part of the Baburnama (1590–95) and most of these are as an assistant or a colourist. His Veena-player (c. 1595) and coronation portrait of Jahangir (c. 1605, made along with the artist Manohar) are early works. In 1612, Jehangir received a turkey cock from Goa and this was illustrated by Mansur. In 1619, Jehangir received a Barbary falcon as a gift from Shah Abbas of Persia; Jehangir found it rare and beautifully patterned and when it died, he ordered that a likeness be made of the bird. In 1620, Jehangir visited Kashmir and spotted a brown dipper which he described in his memoirs (Tuzk-e-Jahangiri) translated as:

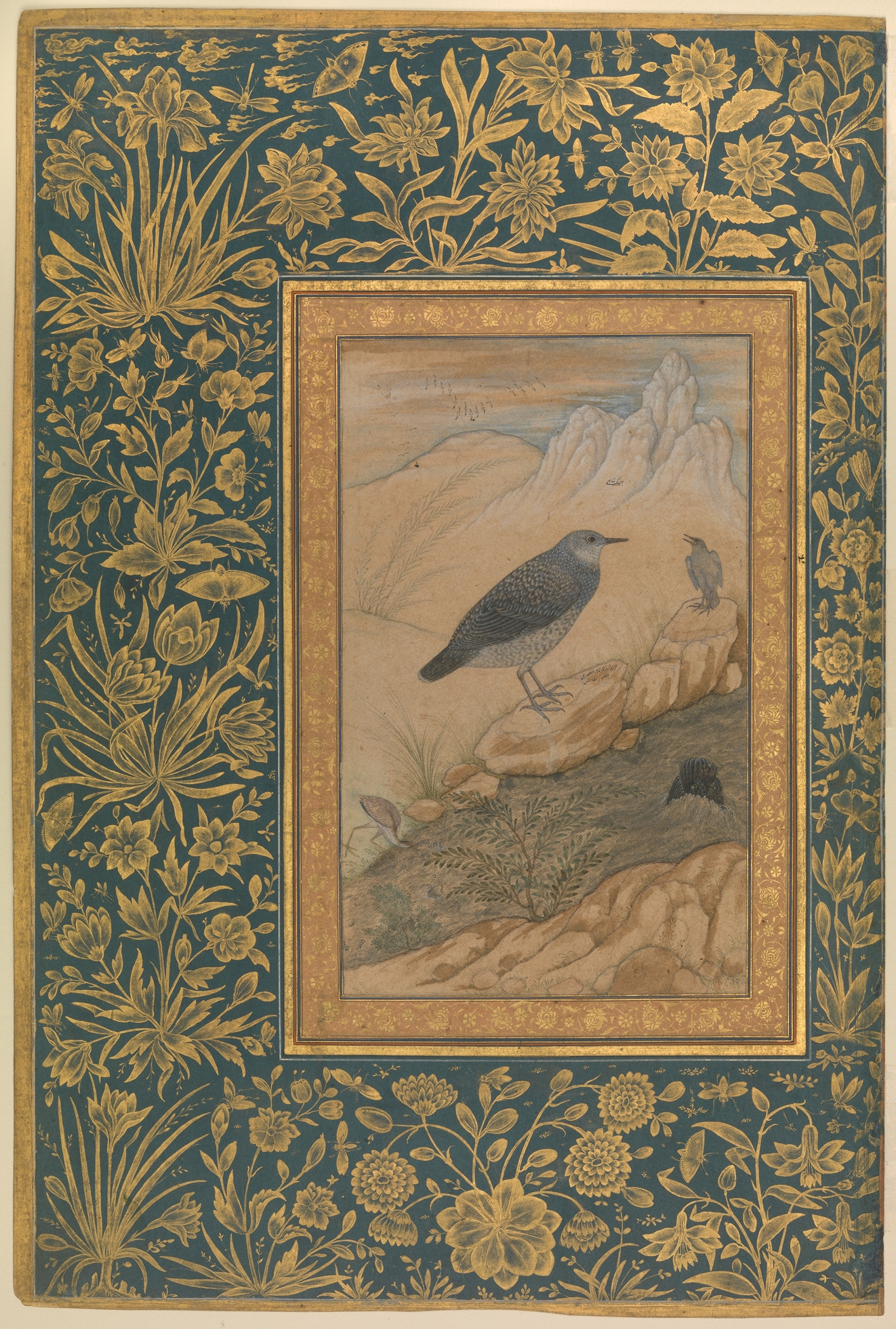
Dipper (c. 1620) from the Metropolitan Museum of Art

"... In this stream I saw a bird like a saj. It dives and remains for a long time underneath and then comes up from a different place. I ordered them to catch and bring two or three of these birds, that I might ascertain whether they were waterfowl and were web-footed, or had open feet like land birds. They caught two... One died immediately and the other lived for a day. Its feet were not webbed like a duck's. I ordered Nadirul-asr Ustad Mansur to draw its likeness."

Mansur painted at least one hundred flowers from the Kashmir valley during this period. A red tulip from Kashmir is a better-known painting. The identity of the tulip is however debated with competing suggestions that include Tulipa lanata, T. montana and T. lehmanniana. In 1621, Jehangir was gifted a zebra and this was perhaps the subject of the last miniature painting made by Mansur. It is suggested that his career ended with the reign of Jehangir in 1627. Several other signed works, such as one of the Siberian crane (now no longer a winter migrant to India) and the other of a Bengal florican are in the Indian Museum, Kolkata. Some other works are in the National Museum, Delhi, the Maharaja Sawai Man Singh II Museum, Jaipur and the Chhatrapati Sivaji Vastu Sangrahalaya, Mumbai.

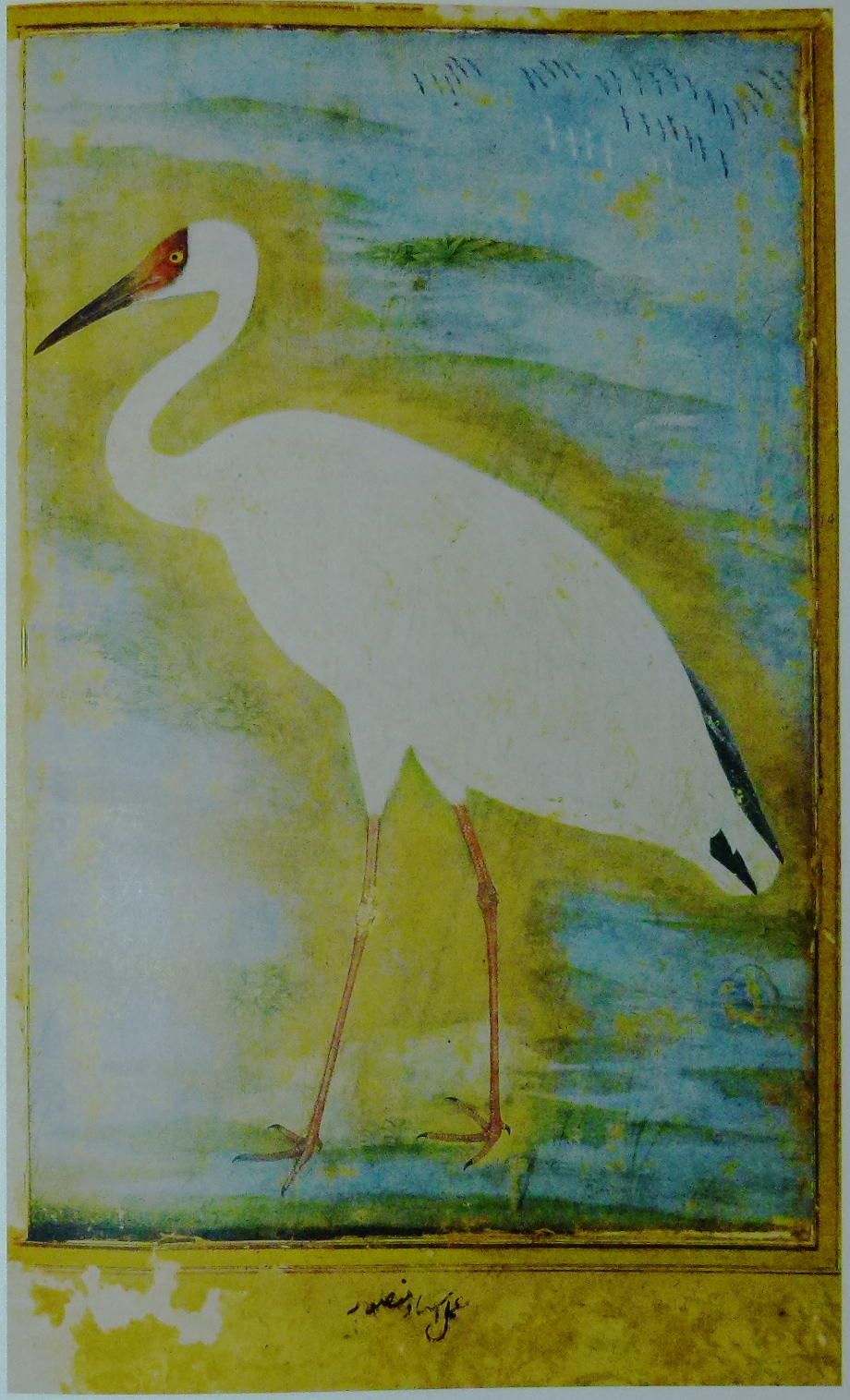
Siberian crane (c. 1625)

Not all of Mansur's birds were based on reality. He also created fantasy birds and many of the compositions such as the flowers and insects in the background are juxtapositions created for effect. It appears that these imaginary birds were made in the style of his senior peers, Miskina and Ikhlas, and were made only early in his career as an artist. In terms of style, Mansur's illustrations focus on detail with a single bird dominating the composition. The birds or animals are in a standing posture or in a feeding stance. He often used plants and insects in the background and the floral borders, characteristic of Mughal works may help in identifying his works.

The most significant paintings, in terms of zoology, are those of the Siberian crane and the dodo. The Siberian crane painting was made well before it was formally described and given a binomial name by Peter Simon Pallas in 1773. The painting of the dodo is among the rare few that were depicted in colour and is a very important source for zoologists. It is thought that the dodo was brought through Surat to Jehangir's court via Portuguese-controlled Goa and the painting of it was discovered in the Hermitage at St. Petersburg and although unsigned has been thought to be the work of Mansur or a close contemporary. Two dodos were described by the English traveller Peter Mundy at Surat and it is thought that the painting is based on one of them. Mundy was in the region between 1628 and 1633. The Siberian crane painted on paper is extremely detailed showing the wrinkles on the bare skin, the legs and a small feather stuck to the claw. Abanindranath Tagore was taken by E. B. Havell, principal of the art school at Calcutta and shown this painting. On examining the detail through a lens, he was inspired to move away from oil on canvas to gouache on paper.

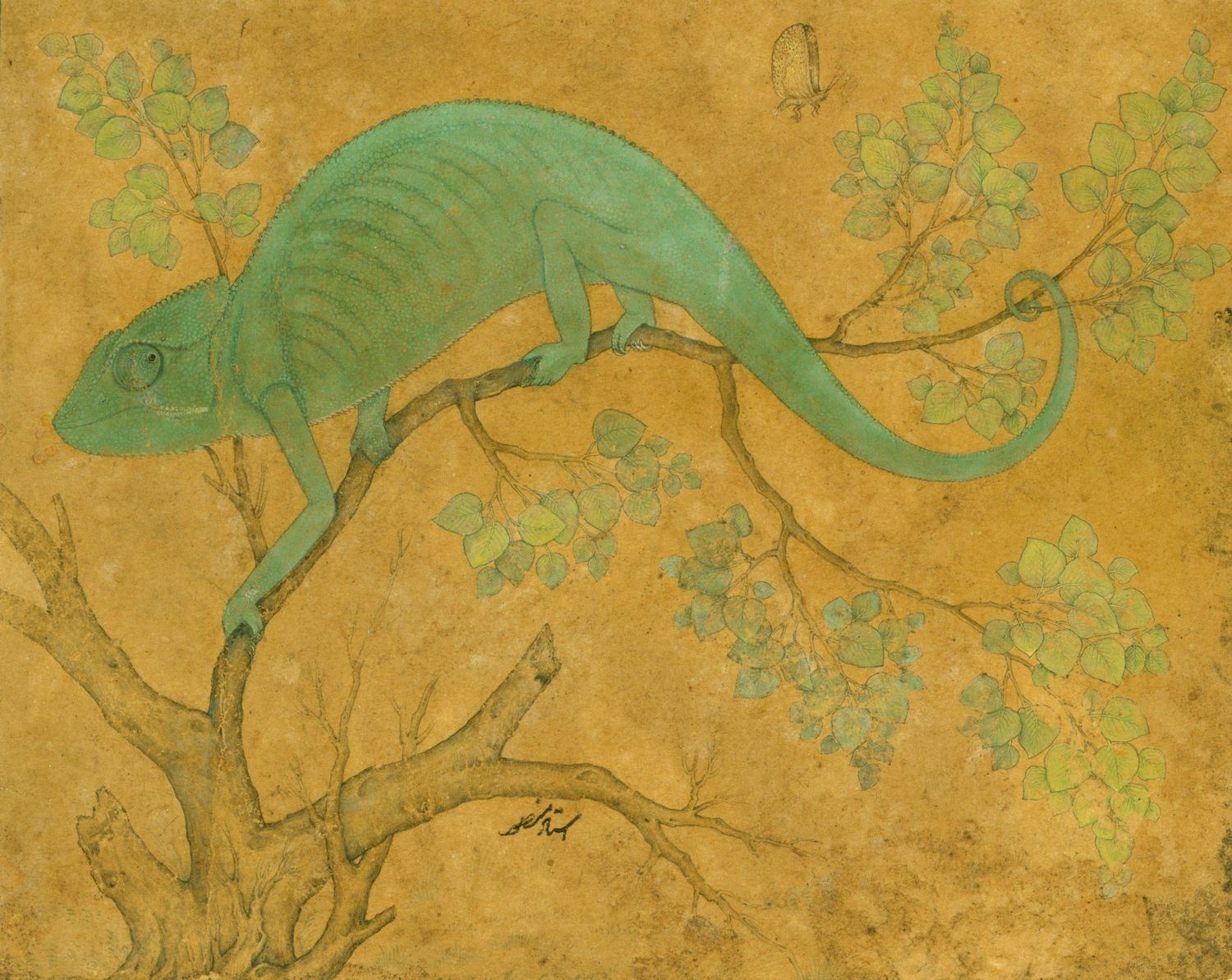
A c. 1612 chameleon at the Royal Gallery attributed to Ustad Mansur

Ustad Mansur was not the only artist in the Mughal court to illustrate flora and fauna. Other artists included Abu'l Hasan, Farrukh Beg, Govardhan, Inayat, Manohar, Muhammad Nadir, Murad and Pidarath. Jehangir considered Mansur and Abu'l Hasan to be exceptional artists. Abu'l Hasan was given the titled of Nadir uz Zaman. Several 17th–19th century artists have come to both imitate and copy his works (sometimes with his signature), especially for export to Europe. It is therefore not easy to assess a true work by Ustad Mansur, which can in case of the chameleon (left) be done by taking in account the quality of the work. The painting is highly detailed and is presumed to be an Indian chameleon on account of the highly detailed view of the feet of the animal showing each foot exhibiting "fused digits in opposed groups", a lighter band by the edge of the mouth, and a line of white scales on the underside of the belly.

Mansur was also a capable portrait artist. His painting of the musician Naubat Khan who worked in the courts of Akbar and later Jahangir is an example. A crater on the planet Mercury is named in honour of Mansur.
