= Dodo Museum =

Museum in Pamplemousses, Mauritius

- Dodo Museum
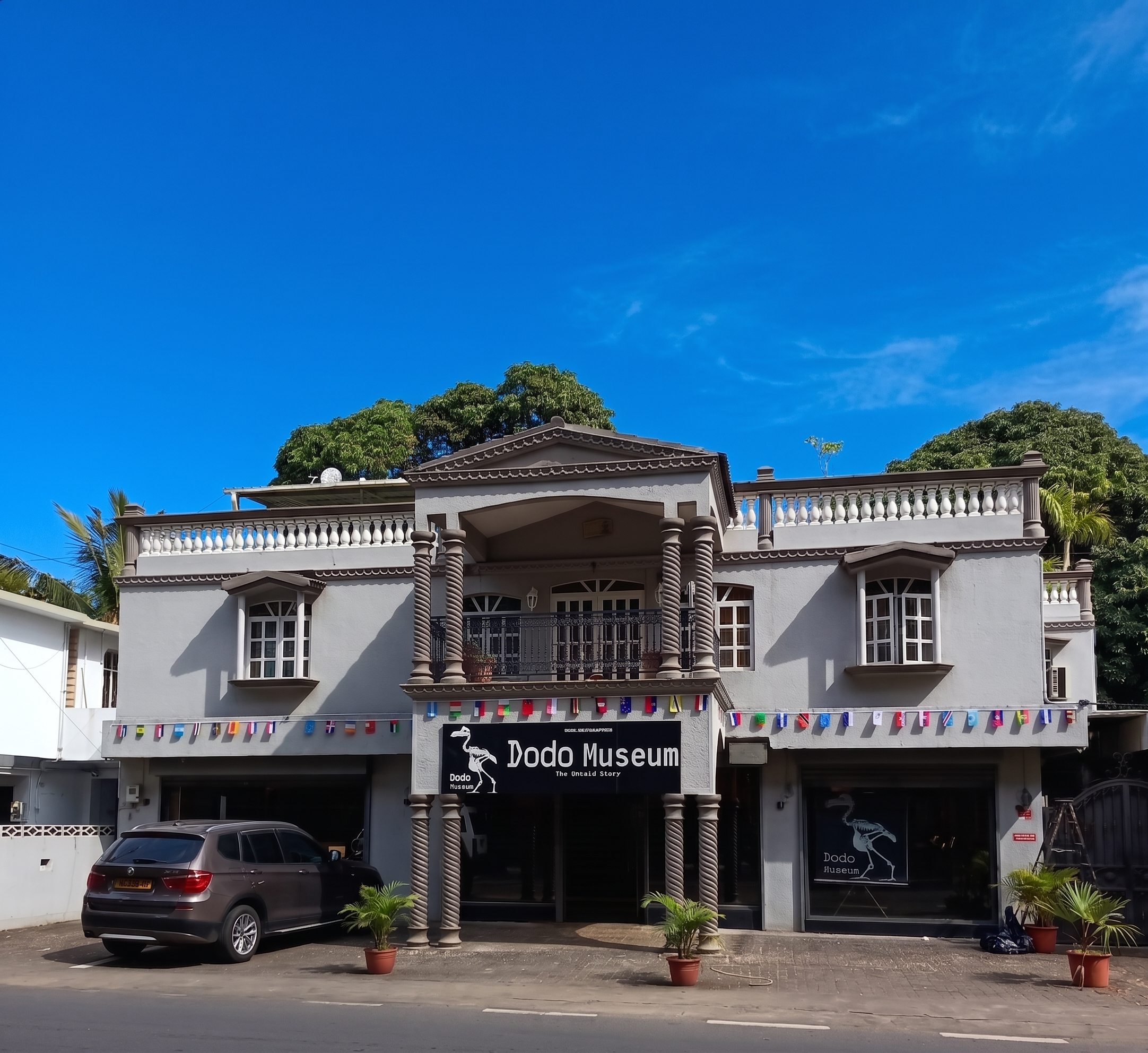
- Established: 11 August 2026
- Location: Pamplemousses, Mauritius
- Coordinates: 20°06′22.8″S 57°34′40.5″E
- Type: Natural history museum
- Key holdings: Ustad Mansur Dodo portrait reproduction, a unique life-sized Dodo paleo reconstruction of Mansur using mansur color
- Collections: Extinct Mauritian fauna, extinct birds of Mauritius Augmented reality, unique red rail real sized paleo reconstruction, Dodo real sized paleo reconstruction, Curator Guided tours.
- Manager: Bernard Eric Typhis Degtyarenko
- CEO: Bernard Eric Typhis Degtyarenko
- Historian: Bernard Eric Typhis Degtyarenko
- Website: dodo.museum www.dodomuseum.com

The Dodo Museum is the only natural history museum dedicated to the extinct dodo and lost endemic species of Mauritius, located in Pamplemousses, Mauritius.

== History ==
The Dodo Museum, the first private natural history museum, was established following ten years of research by founder and curator Eric Typhis Degtyarenko. The initiative grew out of research into 17th-century artistic depictions of the bird, culminating in the interest to reproduce the famous miniature painting by Mughal court artist Ustad Mansur, held at the Institute of Oriental Manuscripts in Saint Petersburg, Russia and the paleo reconstruction of the Mansur dodo life size.The Museum was operational since October 2025. The museum officially opened to the public on 11 August 2026, by famous adventurer Fyodor Konyukhov.

== Exhibitions ==
The museum features life-sized reconstructions, artwork, and historical displays spanning multiple galleries.

The Dodo Hall: Features a unique life-sized paleo model of the dodo, reconstructed using colors and proportions derived from Ustad Mansur's 17th-century life sketch, highlighting seasonal plumage adaptations and camouflage.

The Extinct Bird Species Gallery is dedicated to lesser-known extinct fauna of Mauritius, including the broad-billed parrot and the Mauritius scops owl. It also houses a unique life-sized paleo reconstruction of the red rail, the only one of its kind in the world.

Exploration & Maritime History showcases historical records of early expeditions and figures in maritime exploration, including a unique reconstruction of an Arab dhow and Arab tablet.

The Fauna exhibition also highlights rare endemic plants linked to the dodo, including the dodo tree (Sideroxylon grandiflorum, commonly known as the tambalacoque).

On 6 May 2026, the Dodo Museum signed an agreement for partnership and collaboration with the Darwin Museum in the scientific field. The agreement was signed at the Darwin Museum in Moscow.

Dodo Museum has a birds gallery featuring all the exitinct birds of Mauritius. The gallery features unique photorealistic photos, and augmented reality of all the extinct birds of the Island. This is a modern interactive gallery, using augmented reality.

The Dodo Museum is featured on TripAdvisor, Momove, and other tourist platforms.

== See also ==
- List of museums in Mauritius
