= List of museums in Mauritius =

This is a list of museums in Mauritius.

== List ==
- Blue Penny Museum
- Dodo Museum
- Folk Museum of Indian Immigration
- Frederik Hendrik Museum
- Musée de la Photographie
- National History Museum, Mahebourg
- Natural History Museum, Port Louis
- Robert Edward Hart Memorial Museum
- Sookdeo Bissoondoyal Memorial Museum
- Sir Seewoosagur Ramgoolam Memorial Centre for Culture
- Peopling of Mauritius Museum
- Mauritius Postal Museum
- Château de Labourdonnais
- Eureka House
- Martello Tower at La Preneuse

== See also ==
- Mahatma Gandhi Institute
- Mauritius Museums Council
- List of museums
